= Consulate General of the United Kingdom, Hong Kong =

British diplomatic role

British Consulate General Hong Kong 英國駐香港總領事館
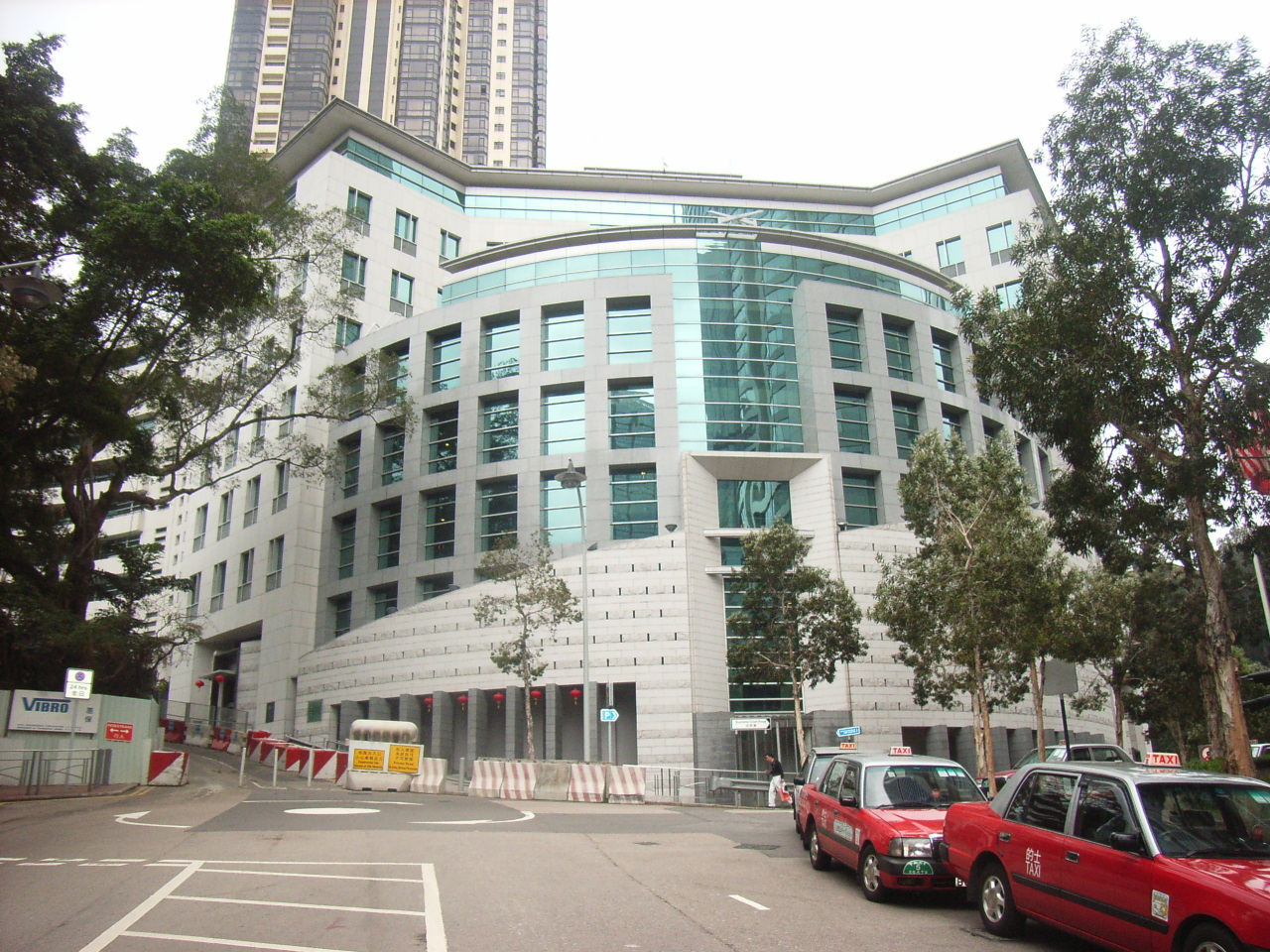
- Location: Hong Kong
- Address: 1 Supreme Court Road, Admiralty, Hong Kong Island
- Coordinates: 22°16′34.25″N 114°9′53.7″E
- Consul General: Brian Davidson, Consul General to Hong Kong and Macau
- Website: British Consulate General Hong Kong

Consulate General of the United Kingdom, Hong Kong
- Traditional Chinese: 英國駐香港總領事館
- Simplified Chinese: 英国驻香港总领事馆
Transcriptions
Standard Mandarin
- Hanyu Pinyin: Yīngguó zhù Xiānggǎng Zǒnglǐngshìguǎn
Yue: Cantonese
- Jyutping: jing1 gwok3 zyu3 hoeng1 gong2 zung2 ling5 si6 gun2

The British Consulate General Hong Kong (BCGHK), located at 1 Supreme Court Road, Admiralty, Hong Kong Island, is one of the largest British consulates general in the world and is bigger than many British embassies and high commissions. It is responsible for maintaining British ties with Hong Kong and Macau.

Together with the Consulate General of the United States of America, Hong Kong and Macau; the Consulate General of Malaysia; and the Consulate General of the Republic of Indonesia, the British consulate general is among the few consulates general in Hong Kong to be housed in its own building.

== Role ==
Due to Hong Kong's status as a special administrative region of the People's Republic of China, the consul general in Hong Kong reports directly to the China Department of the Foreign, Commonwealth and Development Office, instead of to the British ambassador to Beijing, unlike consuls general in mainland China. The consulate general in Hong Kong also serves Macau, with several diplomats accredited specifically to Macau.

The consulate general was also the Regional Passport Processing Centre, handling passport applications from British citizens resident elsewhere in Asia.

Previously, it also processed applications received by the British Trade and Cultural Office (now called the British Office) in Taipei, Taiwan. It also received registrations of marriages from British nationals in Taiwan, although there was no legal requirement for British nationals to do so.

This role ceased in 2014, and all passport-related matters have since been handled by His Majesty's Passport Office in the UK. Furthermore, visa application matters are outsourced to a separate company since 2015.

== History ==
When Hong Kong was under British rule, the governor represented the British government, as well as the British monarch as head of state. Matters relating to British nationality were handled by the Hong Kong Immigration Department.

During the negotiations between Britain and China on the future of Hong Kong, the British proposed the establishment of a "British commissioner" following transfer of sovereignty to China. Some of the diplomatic representatives of Commonwealth countries in Hong Kong were already known as "commissioners". This was rejected by the Chinese as an attempt to make the future Hong Kong Special Administrative Region into a member or associated member of the Commonwealth.

However, the United Kingdom's commercial interests were represented by the British Trade Commission. The last senior trade commissioner (1993-1997), Francis Cornish, became the first British consul general following the transfer of sovereignty to China, on 1 July 1997.

The consulate general was designed by British architects Terry Farrell and Partners. Opened by Princess Anne on 30 January 1997, it was a HK$290 million project, with the British Council in an adjoining building opened in December that year.

The consul general has resided at a rented flat at Opus Hong Kong since 2013.

== List of HM consuls general ==
List of HM consuls general in Hong Kong:

| | Name | Tenure began | Tenure ended | Tenure length | Date of birth (and age) when published | Prior Role | Subsequent Role |
|---|---|---|---|---|---|---|---|
| 1 | Francis Cornish (zh) | July 1997 | November 1997 | 4 months | 18 May 1942 (age 84) | Senior Trade Commissioner to Hong Kong | Head of FCDO News Department |
| 2 | Sir Andrew Burns (zh) | November 1997 | June 2000 | 2 years, 7 months | 21 July 1943 (age 82) | Deputy Under Secretary of State | British High Commissioner to Canada |
| 3 | Sir James Hodge (zh) | June 2000 | November 2003 | 3 years, 5 months | 24 December 1943 (age 82) | British Ambassador to Thailand | Retired from Diplomatic Service |
| 4 | Stephen Bradley (zh) | November 2003 | March 2008 | 4 years, 4 months | 4 April 1958 (age 68) | Minister, Deputy Head of Mission & Consul General to Beijing, China | Retired from Diplomatic Service |
| 5 | Andrew Seaton (zh) | March 2008 | September 2012 | 4 years, 6 months | 20 April 1954 (age 72) | Consul General to Chicago, USA | Retired from Diplomatic Service |
| 6 | Caroline Wilson (zh) | September 2012 | September 2016 | 4 years | 12 August 1970 (age 55) | Minister Counsellor to Moscow, Russia | Europe Director at the FCDO British Ambassador to China |
| 7 | Andrew Heyn (zh) | September 2016 | December 2020 | 4 years, 3 months | 14 January 1962 (age 64) | Director, Leadership, Governance & Diversity Strategy at the Cabinet Office | Retired from Diplomatic Service |
| – | Tamsin Heath (acting) | December 2020 | July 2021 | 7 months | | Deputy Consul General to Hong Kong | Deputy Consul General to Hong Kong |
| 8 | Brian Davidson (zh) | July 2021 | Incumbent | 4 years, 11 months | 28 April 1964 (age 62) | British Ambassador to Thailand | |

== See also ==
- British Consul General to Hong Kong and Macao
- List of diplomatic missions of the United Kingdom
- Consular missions in Hong Kong
- Hong Kong Economic and Trade Office, London
- Hong Kong–United Kingdom relations
- Foreign Office and Colonial Office
- Consulate General of Canada in Hong Kong and Macao
- Consulate General of the United States, Hong Kong and Macau
