= Hong Kong–United Kingdom relations =

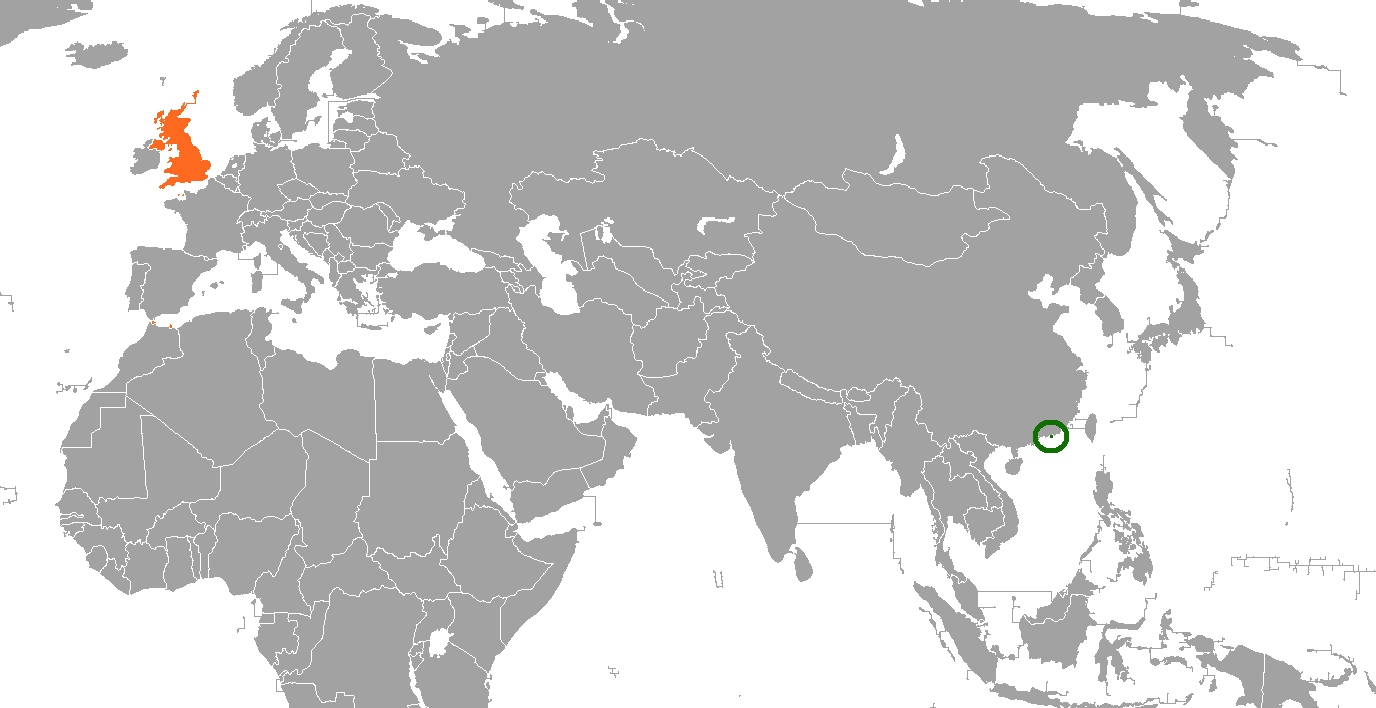

- Hong Kong: United Kingdom

Diplomatic mission
- Hong Kong Economic and Trade Office, London: British Consulate-General, Hong Kong

Envoy
- Director-General Gilford Law Sun-on: Consulate-General Brian Davidson

Hong Kong–United Kingdom relations are the international relations between the post-colonial Hong Kong and the United Kingdom. Hong Kong was a British colony from 1841 to 1997 (except for a brief period of Japanese occupation during the Second World War) when sovereignty was handed over to China. UK policy towards Hong Kong is underpinned by its substantial commercial interests, and fulfilling obligation as the other signatory of Sino–British Joint Declaration on the future of Hong Kong, in addition to support Hong Kong's mini-constitution, the Basic Law, and in accordance with China's policy of observing "one country, two systems". Hong Kong is also home to roughly 2.9 million British National (Overseas)s, 350,000 of which hold an active British passport, giving it one of the largest populations of British passport holders in the world behind only the Anglosphere Commonwealth realms and the United States.

== History ==
Hong Kong–United Kingdom relations
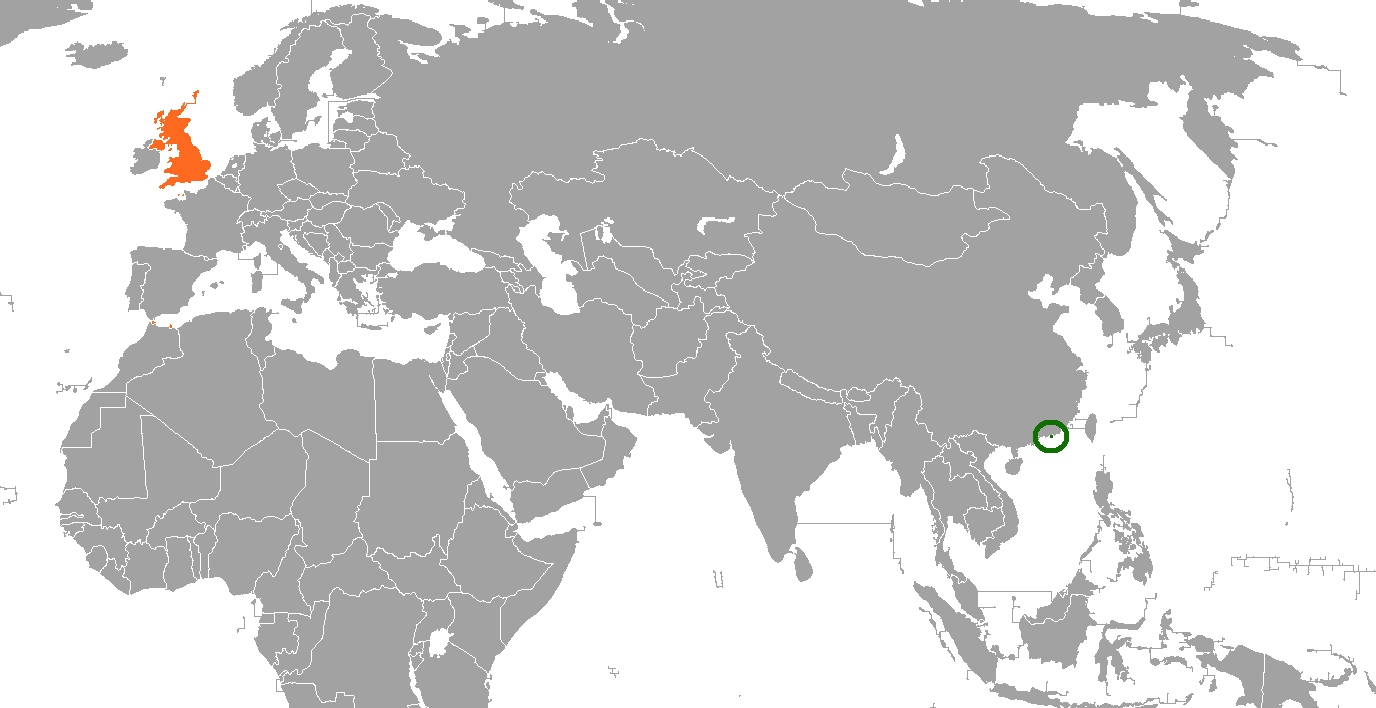

- Hong Kong: United Kingdom

The United Kingdom and the group of offshore islands in the southeastern Pearl River Delta that is today known as Hong Kong have had a long history, playing a deeply important role in the formation of the modern Hong Kong. Sovereignty of Hong Kong was ceded to the UK "in perpetuity" on 29 August 1842 through the Treaty of Nanking. The UK further expanded the territory of Hong Kong in 1860 by another cessation, plus a 99-year lease of the New Territories in 1898.

The stability, security, and predictability of British law and government enabled Hong Kong to flourish as a centre for international trade. Localisation of tertiary institutions, the Hong Kong government and the independent Judiciary in the run-up to the 1997 Handover of sovereignty, caused a progressive retirement of resident British citizens in Hong Kong Civil Service into a minority.

== Bilateral agreements ==
Articles 151, 153 and 155 of Hong Kong Basic Law permits Hong Kong to conclude non-military bilateral agreements with foreign countries, while articles 152 permits Hong Kong joining international organisations.

Both Hong Kong and the UK are full members of FATF and World Trade Organization, and are bilateral participants on air services agreement (since July 1997), Investment Promotion and Protection Agreement (since April 1999), Mutual Legal Assistance Agreement (since 2002), Surrender of Fugitive Offenders and Transfer of Sentenced People Agreements (since March, 1998), and Double Taxation Avoidance Agreement (since 2010). Hong Kong institutions still retain full and associate memberships in Association of Commonwealth Universities and other appropriate organisations under the Commonwealth Foundation umbrella.

== Political relationships ==
Articles 82 and 92 of Hong Kong Basic Law permits Hong Kong to invite judges from other common law jurisdictions to sit on the Court of Final Appeal. Hong Kong Government continues to hire, promote, and appoint British citizens with Right of Abode in Hong Kong or not, to senior posts in Hong Kong Police Force, and Hong Kong Judiciary. Lord Hoffmann, Lord Clarke of Stone-cum-Ebony, Lord Phillips of Worth Matravers are appointed to the Court of Final Appeal as non-permanent justices from other common law jurisdictions. Articles 99, 100, and 101 of Hong Kong Basic Law permits the continuous hiring of British citizens for posts in Hong Kong Civil Service, except policy-decision making posts.

As co-signatory of the Joint Declaration with the People's Republic of China, the UK retains an enduring commitment to Hong Kong after the handover in 1997, including regular semi-annual reports on Hong Kong to the UK parliament, and providing appropriate service to British National (Overseas).

== Diplomatic missions ==
The British Consulate-General has been representing the UK Government from 1 Supreme Court Road in Hong Kong, since the Handover of Hong Kong Sovereignty in July 1997. In the UK, the Hong Kong SAR is represented through the Hong Kong Economic and Trade Office at 18 Bedford Square in London's Bloomsbury.

== Trade and investment ==
A number of UK companies are based in Hong Kong, with the territory remaining an important springboard to the Greater China market. Over 300 UK-based companies have regional headquarters or offices in Hong Kong, and many more are expected to come, to serve Hong Kong's domestic market.

UK's commercial interests in Hong Kong are extensive and range from banking, accounting, legal, engineering and information technology services, to retail and general trading, with book value of investment of more than £33 billion in 2011. UK exported more than £5 billion in goods, a 20.5% increase on the previous year from 2011, making Hong Kong the UK's 13th largest export destination and its third biggest in Asia Pacific, after China and India. Around 4.2% of UK exports to Hong Kong are re-exported to mainland China.

Hong Kong companies have cumulative investments in the UK of more than £25 billion in 2011.

== Cultural ==
The UK 2001 Census recorded 96,445 Hong Kong-born people residing in the United Kingdom. Office for National Statistics estimates suggest that the Hong Kong-born resident population was 78,000 in 2009. These figures would have excluded people who were born elsewhere, yet raised in and emigrated to the UK from Hong Kong, and descendants of Hong Kongers born within the UK.

British Consulate-General estimated a range between 25,000 and 30,000 UK expats based in Hong Kong in 2009. UK expat in Hong Kong includes decreasing number of settled British citizens due to waning colonial privileges, and increasing number of resourceful professionals varying pedigree known as FILTH (Failed In London, Try Hong Kong) who could adapt and aware of Hong Kong culture. Hong Kong Census 2011 recorded that over 33,000 British citizens resided in Hong Kong.

Hong Kong is one of the main source markets for UK boarding schools and universities in terms of overseas born students – with more and more Hong Kong parents sending their children to UK boarding schools at an early stage. On the other way, a network of 20 internationals schools in Hong Kong run by the English Schools Foundation provides UK curriculum for IB seeking pupils.

Hong Kong is one of the annual hosts of the Commonwealth sports calendar, hosting the Hong Kong Cricket Sixes every late October.

== Tourism ==
Hong Kong is Britain's 38th most important market for volume of visits and 27th for the amount spent by visitors as of 2013. Two-fifths of Hong Kong visitors to the UK are British citizens and Hong Kongers visiting friends and relatives and on holidays.

The UK Home Office permits British National (Overseas) of ages 18 to 30 to participate in the Tier 5 (Youth Mobility Scheme) without sponsor nor limits the number of places. Starting from 1 January 2014, both the UK and Hong Kong have offered "Working Holiday Programs" for a maximum stay of 24 months. The programme allows 1000 young students with a Certificate of Sponsorship to holiday in Hong Kong or the UK and to take temporary employment as needed to cover the expenses of their visit. The programme aims to increase travel by young British citizens and young Hong Kong SAR passport holders, and to strengthen the links between the two regions.

Participants receive the same treatment as Hong Kong permanent residents in all matters concerning the application of laws, regulations and practices regarding health and working conditions. This is a 24-month program – one of the longest offered by either government.

== Causeway Bay Books disappearances ==
Between October and December 2015, five staff of Causeway Bay Books went missing. Lee Bo, also known as Paul Lee, a British citizen and a Hong Kong resident, was suspected to be kidnapped by Chinese Communist agents to Mainland China after he was last seen in Chai Wan, Hong Kong Island on 30 December 2015.

The Foreign and Commonwealth Office of the United Kingdom expressed "deep concerns" over the disappearances. British Foreign Minister Philip Hammond requested Hong Kong and China to search for the missing people as it would be an "egregious breach of the one country, two systems policy, Hong Kong's Basic Law and the 1984 Sino-British Joint Declaration for someone to be spirited out of Hong Kong in order to face charges in a different jurisdiction".

Concern on Lee Bo's case was further stressed in Hammond's report on Hong Kong for the second half of 2015.

== See also ==
- History of Hong Kong under British rule
- British Chinese
- Hong Kong people in the United Kingdom
