= Robert Andrew Burns =

British diplomat

Sir Andrew Burns KCMG
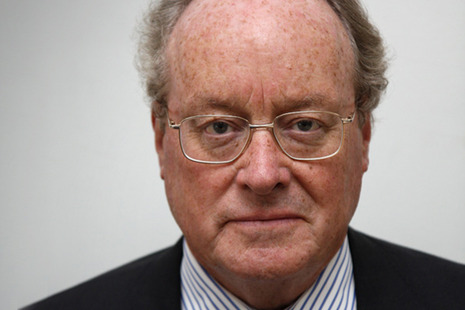
- Andrew Burns in 2012

United Kingdom Special Envoy for Post-Holocaust Issues
- In office 10 June 2010 – September 2015
- Prime Minister: David Cameron
- Preceded by: Office established
- Succeeded by: Eric Pickles

British High Commissioner to Canada
- In office 2000–2003
- Preceded by: Anthony Goodenough
- Succeeded by: David Reddaway

British Consul General to Hong Kong and Macao
- In office November 1997 – June 2000
- Preceded by: Francis Cornish
- Succeeded by: James Hodge

British Ambassador to Israel
- In office 1992–1995
- Preceded by: Mark Elliott
- Succeeded by: Sir David Manning

Personal details
- Born: Robert Andrew Burns; 21 July 1943 (age 82) England
- Education: Highgate School
- Alma mater: Trinity College, Cambridge (MA)

Sir Robert Andrew Burns KCMG (born 21 July 1943) is a British former diplomat in the Foreign and Commonwealth Office.

== Early life ==
Burns was born on 21 July 1943 and educated at Highgate School. He graduated from Trinity College, Cambridge, with a Master of Arts (MA).

== Diplomatic career ==
Burns served with the Diplomatic Service between 1965 and 2003, beginning his career as an Urdu and Hindi speaker at the British High Commission in New Delhi in the 1960s. Serving in New Delhi between 1967 and 1971, the later returned to London where he served as the United Kingdom's Delegate to the Conference for Security and Co-operation in Europe between 1975 and 1981. He later became Head of South Asia Department between 1986 and 1988.

He held the office of Ambassador to Israel between 1992 and 1995. He was later appointed as British Consul General to Hong Kong and Macao, serving between 1997 and 2000. He then became British High Commissioner to Canada, serving from 2000 to 2003.

== Subsequent career ==
In June 2005, Burns was appointed to the BBC's Board of Governors as International Governor, replacing Dame Pauline Neville-Jones.

In June 2010, he was appointed the United Kingdom's first Envoy for post-Holocaust issues. He held this post until September 2015. He was succeeded in the role by Sir Eric Pickles.

He was Chair of Council of Royal Holloway, a constituent college of the University of London. He was appointed to succeed Lady Deech as the chair of the Bar Standards Board from 1 January 2015.

Burns was also previously Chairman of the China Association between 2008 and 2014 and is a Fellow of the Royal Society for the encouragement of Arts, Manufactures & Commerce (RSA).

Diplomatic posts
Preceded by Mark Elliott	British Ambassador to Israel; 1992–1995	Succeeded by Sir David Manning
Preceded by Francis Cornish	British Consul-General, Hong Kong; 1997–2000	Succeeded by James Hodge
Preceded by Anthony Goodenough	British High Commissioner to Canada; 2000–2003	Succeeded by David Reddaway
New post	UK Special Envoy for Post-Holocaust Issues; 2010–2015	Succeeded by Eric Pickles
