= Stephen Evans (diplomat) =

British diplomat

Stephen Evans CMG OBE (born 29 June 1950) is a British diplomat who has been on secondment since 2011 as NATO Assistant Secretary General for Operations.

== Career ==
Stephen Nicholas Evans was educated at King's College, Taunton, then gained a BA degree from Bristol University. He served a three-year "short service commission" as a lieutenant in the Royal Tank Regiment 1971–74 before joining the Foreign and Commonwealth Office (FCO). After studying Vietnamese language at the School of Oriental and African Studies, he was head of chancery and consul at Hanoi 1978–80. After Thai language training he was first secretary at Bangkok 1983–86. He was head of the Political Section at the embassy in Turkey 1990–93, counsellor economic at the British High Commission in Pakistan 1993–96, and on secondment with the United Nations Special Mission to Afghanistan 1996–97.

Evans returned to London in 1997 as head of the OSCE/Council of Europe Department at the FCO. In 1998, he moved within the FCO to become head of the South Asia Department, before being appointed chargé d'affaires in Kabul, Afghanistan, in 2001. He moved to become British high commissioner to Sri Lanka and the Maldives, based in Colombo, Sri Lanka, in 2002.

Between 2006 and 2007, Evans was the British ambassador to Afghanistan in Kabul; returning to the FCO in 2007 as director of Afghanistan information strategy.

He spent the academic year 2007–08 at Corpus Christi College, Cambridge, gaining the degree of Master of Philosophy in historical studies. He then resumed his diplomatic career, serving as High Commissioner to Bangladesh 2008–11. In 2011 he was seconded to NATO as assistant secretary general for operations.

== Honours ==
Evans was appointed OBE in the 1994 New Year Honours, and CMG "in recognition of services in support of operations in Afghanistan" in 2002.

== Family ==
In 1975, Evans married Sharon Ann Holdcroft, with whom he has a son and two daughters.

Diplomatic posts
Preceded by Linda Duffield	High Commissioner to Sri Lanka; 2002–2006	Succeeded by Dominick Chilcott
Preceded by Francis Cornish	Ambassador to Afghanistan; 2006–2007	Succeeded by Sir Sherard Cowper-Coles
Preceded by Anwar Choudhury	High Commissioner to Bangladesh; 2008–2011	Succeeded by Robert Gibson
