= Barney Smith (diplomat) =

Retired British diplomat

Lloyd Barnaby "Barney" Smith CMG (born 21 July 1945) is a retired British diplomat.

== Career ==
Smith was educated at Merchant Taylors' School and Brasenose College, Oxford. He joined the Diplomatic Service in 1968 and served in Bangkok, Paris, Dublin, Brussels and Bangkok (with a year at the École nationale d'administration in Paris). He was ambassador to Nepal 1995–99 and ambassador to Thailand (concurrently non-resident ambassador to Laos) 2000–03. He was editor of Asian Affairs 2005–16. He was a non-executive director 2006–14, and chairman 2011–14, of Coastal Energy, an oil and gas company working in Thailand and Malaysia which was bought by CEPSA in 2014.

Diplomatic posts
Preceded by Timothy George	British Ambassador to Nepal; 1995–1999	Succeeded by Ronald Nash
Preceded by Sir James Hodge	British Ambassador to Thailand; 2000–2003	Succeeded by David Fall
Preceded by Sir James Hodge	British Ambassador to Laos (non-resident); 2000–2003	Succeeded by David Fall
