= Matthew Gould =

Ambassador of the United Kingdom

Matthew Gould CMG MBE
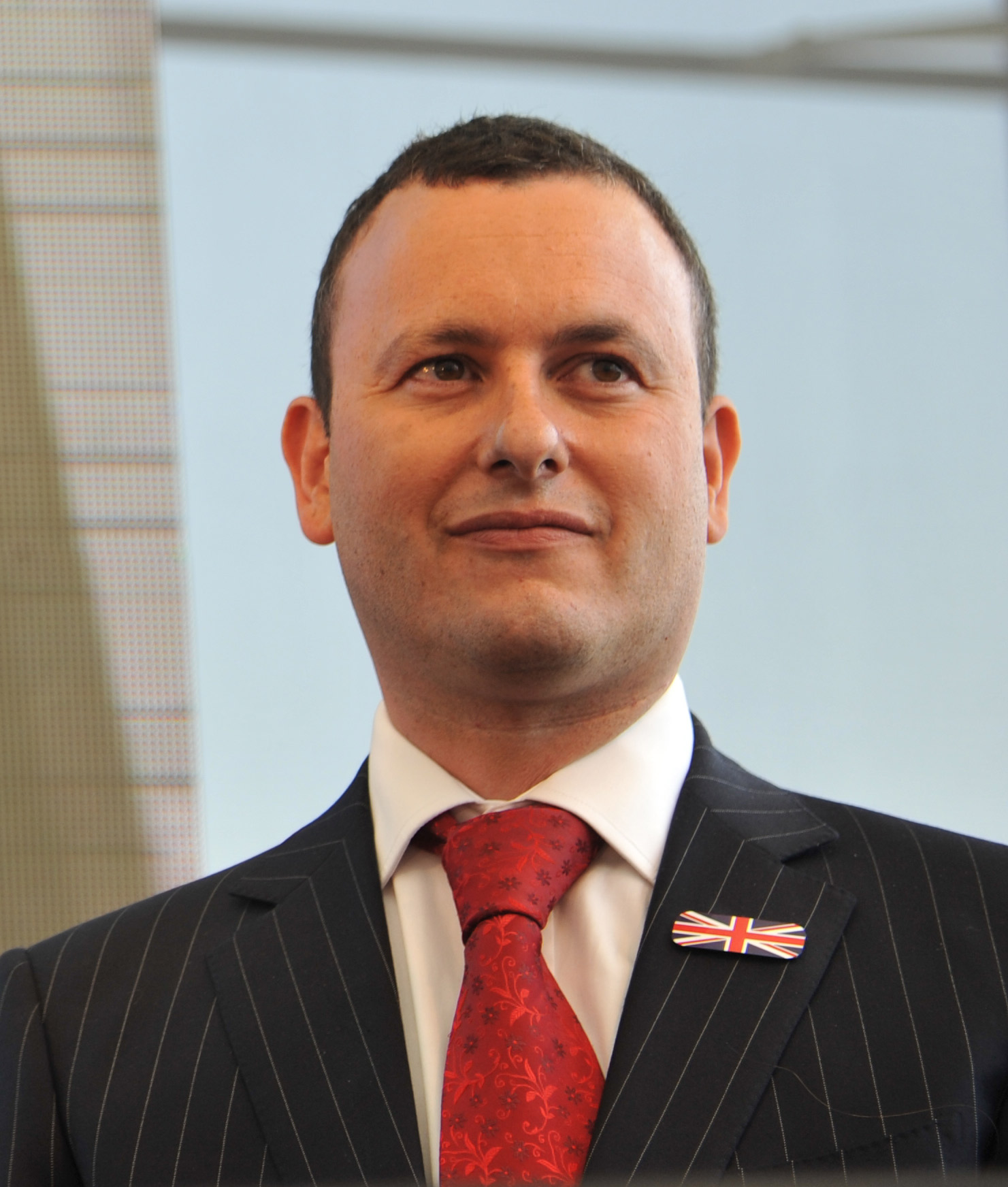

British Ambassador to Israel
- In office September 2010 – 2015
- Monarch: Elizabeth II
- Prime Minister: David Cameron
- Preceded by: Sir Tom Phillips
- Succeeded by: David Quarrey

Personal details
- Born: Matthew Steven Gould; 20 August 1971 (age 55) Wembley, London, England
- Spouse: Celia Leaberry
- Children: 2
- Known for: Being the first Jew to serve as British Ambassador to Israel

Matthew Steven Gould CMG MBE (born 20 August 1971) is a British former civil servant and diplomat who is the former Chief Executive Officer of Zoological Society of London (ZSL). He was previously National Director for Digital Transformation in NHS England (2019–2022), Director General for Digital and Media Policy in the Department for Digital, Culture, Media and Sport (2015–19) and Ambassador to Israel (2010–15).

== Early life ==
Gould is descended from Polish Jews who immigrated to the United Kingdom before World War II. His father, a mathematician, changed the family name from Goldkorn to Gould. He has two older brothers. Gould grew up in Wembley, London.

He was educated at Orley Farm School, Harrow before moving to St. Paul's School, where he was a contemporary of George Osborne, Patrick Neate, and Ed Vaizey. After St Paul's he spent a year teaching at Nyarukunda Secondary School in Northern Zimbabwe, with the organisation Project Trust. He then went to Peterhouse, Cambridge, where he read philosophy and divinity. During this time, he spent a summer in Tanzania with the environmental NGO Frontier, and subsequently published an article on termite feeding preferences in the academic journal Sociobiology.

== Foreign Office, 1993–2010 ==
After joining the British Foreign Office in 1993, Gould initially served as Assistant Desk Officer (NATO/Bosnia), Security Policy Department until 1994; and then as Second Secretary in Manila in charge of political affairs and press from 1994 to 1997.

In Manila, Gould launched a programme of co-operation between Britain and the Philippines to combat child abuse, which included bringing detectives from the UK to run training courses for Filipino police officers. He was awarded the MBE for this work in the 1997 New Year's Honours list, at age 26. Gould was in Manila when Robin Cook visited as Foreign Secretary. Gould wrote a speech for Cook, and was immediately appointed by him as his speechwriter, continuing until 1999. During this period, Gould coordinated and led a group of young FCO officials keen to reform the FCO. Initially known as the Young Turks, the project led to the Foresight Report, a major internal review of how the FCO worked. The report was widely credited with helping the FCO to modernise itself and develop new and more open working practices.

Gould served as Deputy Head of the FCO's Consular Division from 1999 to 2001. In this time, he worked with Baroness Scotland, then Parliamentary Under-Secretary of State, to create a more effective and active approach to the practice of forced marriage. Gould established a new unit in the FCO tasked with combatting forced marriage and helping its victims. From 2002 to 2003, he was Political Counsellor in Islamabad. From 2003 to 2005, Gould was Deputy Head of Mission in Tehran, and Chargé d'Affaires (acting Ambassador) for six months of this time. In June 2004, the Iranian Revolutionary Guard arrested six Royal Marines and two Royal Navy sailors on the Shaatt al Arab waterway, and held them for three days. Gould was sent to Khuzestan to negotiate their release, and flew back with them to Tehran.

From 2005 to 2007, Gould was Foreign and Security Policy Counsellor and the Representative of the Joint Intelligence Committee in Washington, DC. Afterwards, from April to July 2007, Gould was Private Secretary for Foreign Affairs to the Prime Minister, initially with Tony Blair and then under Gordon Brown.

He was Principal Private Secretary to the Foreign Secretary from July 2007 to July 2010, running the office of David Miliband for almost all the latter's time as Foreign Secretary, and then of William Hague for the first few months that he was in office.

== As Ambassador to Israel ==
In September 2010, Gould took up the post of British ambassador to Israel, and served in that role until 2015. He was the first Jew in the post, and spoke of his pride in the position on a number of occasions. In a 2010 interview with the Jewish Telegraph he said "You cannot do this job without being a passionate Zionist".

In a video message that coincided with his arrival in Israel, Gould outlined his three goals: Explaining Israel to Britain; explaining Britain to Israel and forging a strong partnership between the two. Gould said, “I need to give a strong message from Britain that as Israel goes down the difficult path to peace, Israel isn't alone.” He also said, “Britain is very clear: We regard Israel as an important strategic partner.” Before he was ambassador, Gould was involved in a number of secret meetings organised by Denis MacShane, involving himself, Liam Fox and Adam Werritty. The Foreign Office said in response that "The FCO has total confidence that Matthew Gould has acted appropriately at all times and at no stage was he acting independently, or out of line with government policy."

In November 2011, in discussing religious faith and diplomats, Middle East Minister Alistair Burt said that "there is absolutely no reason why our ambassador to Israel should not be Jewish. Any allegations about Matthew Gould's conduct are utterly unsubstantiated. He is a first-class ambassador." Douglas Alexander, the Shadow Foreign Secretary, said: "The faith of any British diplomat is irrelevant to their capability to their job. To make suggestions otherwise is wrong and offensive. On a personal note I know from my time in government Matthew Gould embodies all that is good in British diplomacy."

=== Holocaust survivors initiative ===
In 2011, Gould and wife Celia, together with then-Israeli ambassador to London Ron Prosor, launched an appeal in the UK Jewish community to raise money to aid Holocaust survivors in Israel. Approximately half of the £2 million goal has been raised, and six social clubs for survivors are being set up around Israel. The first was officially opened in February 2012, in the presence of Israeli Welfare Minister Moshe Kahlon.

=== Israel and Iran's nuclear threat ===
Gould told the Israeli daily newspaper Haaretz in November 2011 that efforts at preventing a nuclear program in Iran are continuing and that "The U.K. and Israel stay in very close touch about the threat from Iran."

=== Israel's "Boycott bill" ===
Following the passage by the Israeli Knesset in July 2011 of the "Boycott Bill", which allows Israeli citizens to sue organisations or persons calling for a boycott against Israel or parts of Israel, and forbids the government from funding such organisations, Gould told the Israeli daily Maariv newspaper, "We are concerned about the passing of this law, which damages the legitimate right to freedom of speech, and which conflicts with the strong Israeli tradition of lively and vigorous political debate."

In November 2011, he warned Israeli MK Ofir Akunis that the passage of a bill that would limit foreign funding to human rights organisations, would "reflect badly on Israel in the international community". Gould has also spoken at major conferences to urge Israel to ensure it is living up to its founding vision of a nation for all its citizens, saying that if Israel's prosperity is to be sustainable, it needs to harness the economic potential of all its communities – including the Arab community of Israel.

=== Promoting Israeli and UK hi-tech ===
In October 2010, Gould and the British Embassy in Israel launched the UK-Israel Technologies Hub, tasked with forging a technology partnership between the two countries in three main areas: digital, bio-medical, and clean tech. The Hub was described as "the only dedicated group in the world promoting high-tech cooperation from inside an embassy".

=== Israeli-UK science initiatives ===
Gould has been involved in a number of projects aimed at strengthening relations between the two countries, including the revamped BIRAX Regenerative Medicine Initiative, through which £10 million would be invested in 15 major UK-Israel research projects over a five-year period. The initiative was launched at a conference at Israel's Ben-Gurion University of the Negev in November 2011, which drew 250 experts in the field, including 60 British scientists from 20 universities.

=== International community support for Israel ===
Gould said in an interview in August 2012, "Israelis might wake up in 10 years time and find out that suddenly the international community has changed, and that patience for continuing the status quo has reduced." Though these comments raised some criticism, Anshel Pfeffer, writing in Haaretz, said, "not only is Gould not betraying his roots, he is doing the Jews of Britain a huge favor," saying that this will give strength to those British Jews who wish to say something critical of Israel but at the same time show support for Israel. According to an article in the Jewish Chronicle of London, an "Israeli Foreign Ministry source said privately that it was a pity more diplomats did not say what Mr Gould had said."

=== Encouraging Jewish partnership with Oxfam ===
Gould said in January 2013, that supporters of Israel in Britain should do more to engage with critics of Israel, saying "If the friends of Israel only engage with those who already agree with them, they will find it difficult to win the argument." This came on the heels of a controversial partnering between the British Board of Deputies, which represents the UK's Jewish community, with Oxfam, which has been criticised for being anti-Israel.

He was appointed Companion of the Order of St Michael and St George (CMG) in the 2014 Birthday Honours for services to British interests in Israel, particularly trade and investment scientific and technological co-operation.

== Cabinet Office and DCMS, 2015–2019 ==
In late 2015, Gould was described as Director of Cyber Security and Information Assurance at the Cabinet Office.

In March 2016, he was listed as director of the European and Global Issues Secretariat, part of the Cabinet Office which coordinates policy on international trade and development. This role probably ceased when the unit was reorganised in June 2016 under Olly Robbins, in connection with the UK's relationship with the European Union.

In October 2016, Gould became the government's first Director General for Digital and Media, based in the Department for Culture, Media and Sport (DCMS). In this role, which he held until May 2019, he worked on policies for connectivity, digital skills and growth of digital companies. The unit's remit was widened in March 2018 to cover open data, data ethics and data sharing. In March 2019, Gould described and defended the unit's role when he appeared before the Science and Technology Select Committee during its enquiry into digital government.

== NHS England ==
In May 2019, Gould was appointed as the first chief executive of NHSX, which oversees digitisation of NHS England and commissions projects from NHS Digital and other bodies. NHSX came to public notice in April 2020 after it commissioned NHS COVID-19, a contact tracking app to monitor the spread of COVID-19, which was later dropped by the UK government in favour of an Apple/Google-developed alternative. Michael Gove, Cabinet Office minister, described Gould as an "inspirational public servant" when replying to questions on the app in the Commons in April 2020.

When NHSX was merged into NHS Digital in February 2022, Gould was appointed dual roles as the National Director for Digital Transformation in NHS England, and Director General for Digital Transformation in the Department of Health and Social Care. He left these roles in April 2022.

== Zoological Society of London ==
Gould was CEO of the Zoological Society of London (ZSL) between September 2022 and November 2025. He resigned from the position amid an independent investigation into claims of "unacceptable workplace behaviour".

== Personal life ==
Gould married Celia Leaberry in 2009, and their first daughter was born at the Tel Aviv Sourasky Medical Center in April 2011. Their second daughter was also born in Israel, in May 2013. They lived at the British Ambassador's official residence in Ramat Gan with three cats and two dogs.

Gould received an honorary doctorate from Ben Gurion University in December 2012.

As of 2022, he lived in Somerset with his wife and two daughters.

Diplomatic posts
Preceded by Dr Peter Hayes	Principal Private Secretary to the Foreign Secretary; 2007–2010	Succeeded by Lindsay Croisdale-Appleby
Preceded by Sir Tom Phillips	British Ambassador to Israel; 2010–2015	Succeeded by David Quarrey
