= List of ambassadors of the United Kingdom to Israel =

The ambassador of the United Kingdom to Israel is the United Kingdom's foremost diplomatic representative in Israel, and in charge of the UK's diplomatic mission in Israel. The official title is His Britannic Majesty's Ambassador to the State of Israel.

== Heads of missions ==
=== High commissioners (Palestine under British Mandate) ===
- 1920–1925: Sir Herbert Samuel
- 1925–1928: Sir Herbert Plumer
- 1928: Sir Harry Luke (acting)
- 1928–1931: Sir John Chancellor
- 1931–1938: Sir Arthur Wauchope
- 1938–1944: Sir Harold MacMichael
- 1944–1945: John Vereker, 6th Viscount Gort
- 1945–1948: Sir Alan Cunningham

=== Ambassadors ===
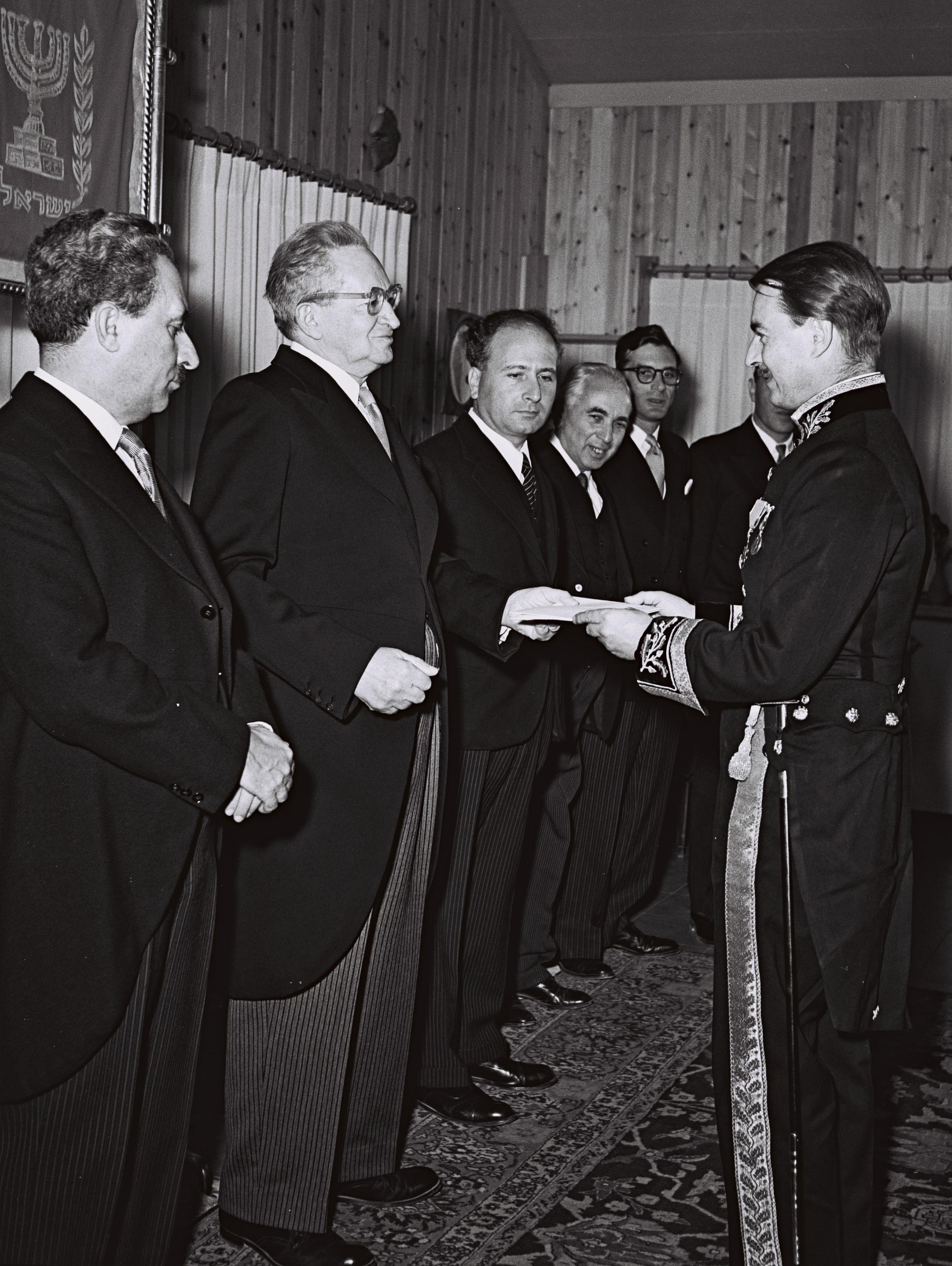
John W. Nicholls, British Ambassador to Israel, presenting his credentials to Yitzhak Ben-Zvi, President of Israel

- 1948–1949: No representation
- 1949–1951: Sir Knox Helm
- 1951–1954: Sir Francis Evans
- 1954–1957: Sir John Walter Nicholls
- 1957–1959: Sir Francis Rundall
- 1959–1963: Sir Patrick Hancock
- 1963–1965: Sir John Beith
- 1965–1969: Sir Michael Hadow
- 1969–1972: Sir Ernest John Ward Barnes
- 1972–1975: Sir Bernard Ledwidge
- 1975–1976: Thomas Anthony Keith Elliott
- 1976–1980: Sir John Mason
- 1980–1981: John Robinson
- 1981–1984: Sir Patrick Moberly
- 1984–1988: Dr William Squire
- 1988–1992: Mark Elliott
- 1992–1995: Sir Andrew Burns
- 1995–1998: Sir David Manning
- 1998–2001: Francis Cornish
- 2001–2003: Sir Sherard Cowper-Coles
- 2003–2006: Simon McDonald, Baron McDonald of Salford
- 2006–2010: Sir Tom Phillips
- 2010–2015: Matthew Gould
- 2015–2019: David Quarrey
- 2019–2023: Neil Wigan
- 2023–present: Simon Walters

== See also ==
- Embassy of the United Kingdom, Tel Aviv
- Israel–United Kingdom relations
