= United Kingdom Special Envoy for Post-Holocaust Issues =

British diplomatic office

The United Kingdom Special Envoy for Post-Holocaust Issues is responsible for developing and implementing UK Government policy with respect to encouraging the restitution of Holocaust-era assets, including art and immovable property; ensuring the accessibility and preservation of the Bad Arolsen archival record of the Nazi era and its aftermath, and promoting Holocaust education, remembrance and research.

Robert Andrew Burns served as the first envoy from 2010 to 2015. He was succeeded by Eric Pickles, who was appointed in 2015. Pickles left the position around April 2025 and High Peak MP Jon Pearce was appointed by Prime Minister Keir Starmer in January 2026.

== List of special envoys ==
Special Envoys	Term of office		Length of Term	Prime Minister
Sir Robert Andrew Burns	10 June 2010	10 September 2015	5 years, 3 months	David Cameron
Eric Pickles; Baron Pickles	10 September 2015	April 2025	9 years, 6 months	David Cameron
Eric Pickles; Baron Pickles	10 September 2015	April 2025	9 years, 6 months	Theresa May
Eric Pickles; Baron Pickles	10 September 2015	April 2025	9 years, 6 months	Boris Johnson
Eric Pickles; Baron Pickles	10 September 2015	April 2025	9 years, 6 months	Liz Truss
Eric Pickles; Baron Pickles	10 September 2015	April 2025	9 years, 6 months	Rishi Sunak
Eric Pickles; Baron Pickles	10 September 2015	April 2025	9 years, 6 months	Keir Starmer
Jon Pearce MP	26 January 2026	Incumbent	8 months	Keir Starmer
Jon Pearce MP	26 January 2026	Incumbent	8 months	Andy Burnham
