= Eric Pickles =

British Conservative politician (born 1952)

The Right Honourable The Lord Pickles PC
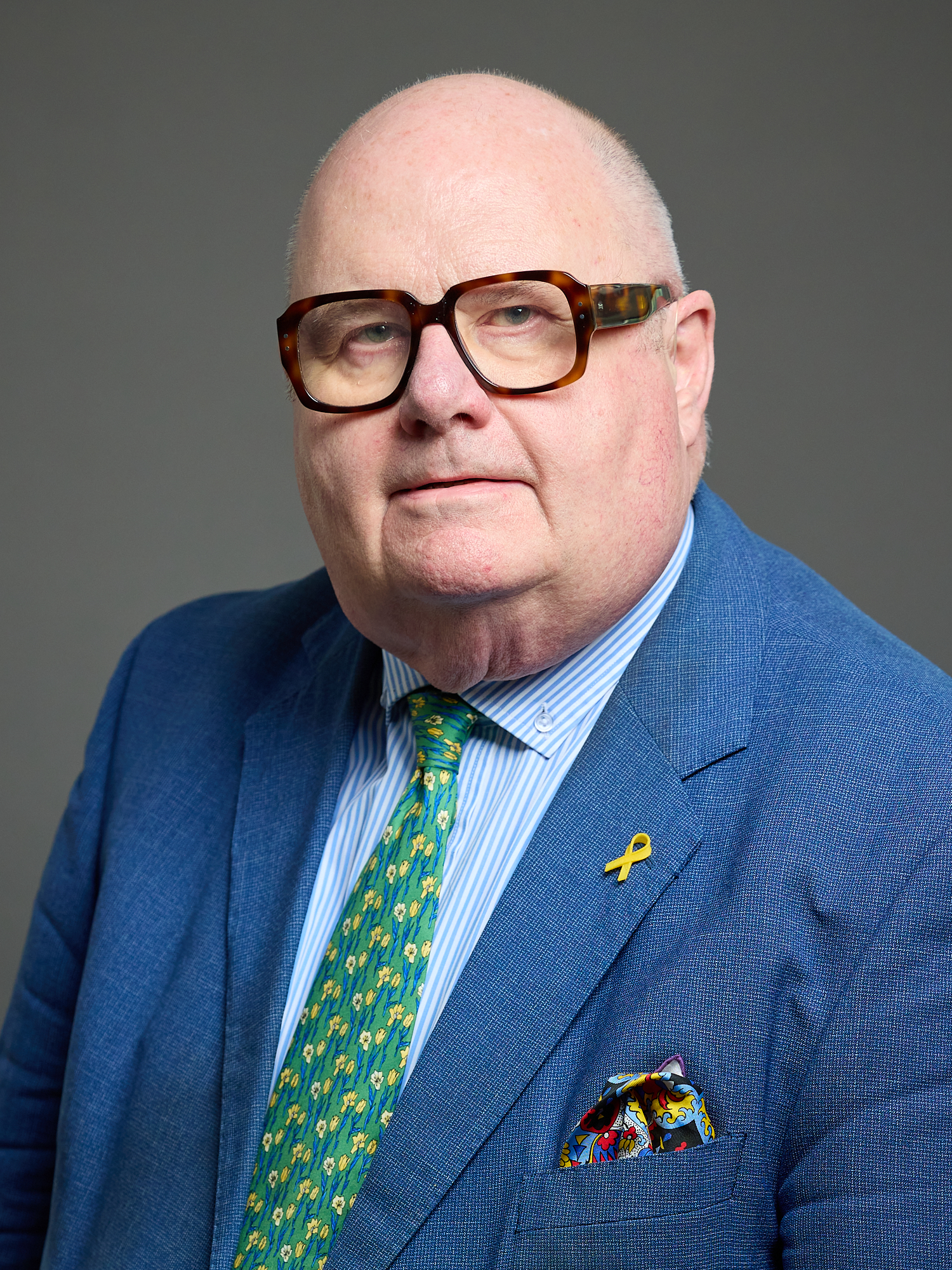
- Official portrait, 2025

United Kingdom Special Envoy for Post-Holocaust Issues
- In office 10 September 2015 – April 2025
- Prime Minister: David Cameron; Theresa May; Boris Johnson; Liz Truss; Rishi Sunak; Keir Starmer
- Preceded by: Robert Andrew Burns
- Succeeded by: Jon Pearce

United Kingdom Anti-Corruption Champion
- In office 11 May 2015 – 11 December 2017
- Prime Minister: David Cameron; Theresa May
- Preceded by: Matt Hancock
- Succeeded by: John Penrose

Secretary of State for Communities and Local Government
- In office 12 May 2010 – 11 May 2015
- Prime Minister: David Cameron
- Preceded by: John Denham
- Succeeded by: Greg Clark

Minister of State for Faith
- In office 6 August 2014 – 11 May 2015
- Prime Minister: David Cameron
- Preceded by: The Baroness Warsi
- Succeeded by: The Lord Bourne of Aberystwyth (Note: Office vacant between 11 May 2015 and 17 July 2016.)

Chairman of the Conservative Party
- In office 19 January 2009 – 12 May 2010
- Leader: David Cameron
- Preceded by: Caroline Spelman
- Succeeded by: The Lord Feldman of Elstree; The Baroness Warsi

Member of the House of Lords
- Lord Temporal
- Life peerage 18 June 2018

Member of Parliament for Brentwood and Ongar
- In office 9 April 1992 – 3 May 2017
- Preceded by: Robert McCrindle
- Succeeded by: Alex Burghart

Shadow Cabinet portfolios
- 2002: Local Government and the Regions
- 2003–2005: Local Government
- 2007–2009: Communities and Local Government

Personal details
- Born: Eric Jack Pickles; 20 April 1952 (age 74) Keighley, England
- Party: Conservative
- Spouse: Irene Coates
- Education: Leeds Metropolitan University
- Website: gov.uk
- Pickles' voice from the BBC programme Desert Island Discs, 9 December 2012

Eric Jack Pickles, Baron Pickles (born 20 April 1952) is a British Conservative Party politician who served as Member of Parliament (MP) for Brentwood and Ongar from 1992 to 2017. He served in David Cameron's Cabinet as Secretary of State for Communities and Local Government from 2010 to 2015. During his time at the Communities and Local Government department, Grenfell tower was renovated using highly combustable cladding, something Pickles was later heavily criticised for allowing during the subsequent inquiry following a fire at the tower in June 2017. There were calls for Pickles to resign as a Conservative party peer from the House of Lords, but he refused to do so. He previously served as Chairman of the Conservative Party from 2009 to 2010 and was later the United Kingdom Anti-Corruption Champion from 2015 to 2017.

Pickles was appointed the second United Kingdom Special Envoy for Post-Holocaust Issues in 2015. He stood down as an MP at the 2017 general election, but continued in his role as Special Envoy under Prime Ministers Theresa May, Boris Johnson, Liz Truss, Rishi Sunak, and Keir Starmer. He is the chairman of Conservative Friends of Israel in the House of Lords as of 2023.

== Early life ==
Eric Jack Pickles was born on 20 April 1952, the son of Jack and Constance Pickles. Born in Keighley, West Riding of Yorkshire, he attended Greenhead Grammar School (now Carlton Keighley) and then studied at Leeds Polytechnic. He was born into a Labour-supporting family – his great-grandfather was one of the founders of the Independent Labour Party, and Pickles described himself as "massively inclined" towards communism as a boy.

== Young Conservatives ==
After the Soviet Union invaded Czechoslovakia, he joined the local Keighley Branch of the Young Conservatives in 1968, later commenting, "I joined because of the invasion of Czechoslovakia. I was so shocked by the tanks. It was not the best way of fighting Brezhnev, but it made me feel better".

Pickles soon became the chairman of the local Young Conservatives association. During his time in the Young Conservatives he became a member of the Joint Committee Against Racism from 1982 to 1987 and later became its chairman. His period as national Young Conservative chairman saw growing factionalism with challenges from a southern-based right wing to Pickles' moderate leadership. Pickles also moved against right-wingers in Bradford, expelling the Young Conservative, Yorkshire Chairman of the Monday Club who had stood for the Bradford Wyke Ward on an anti-immigrant platform from the Bradford area constituencies.

== Bradford councillor ==
Pickles was first elected to Bradford Council in 1979, representing the Worth Valley ward. From 1982 to 1984, he chaired that Council's Social Services Committee, and then, from 1984 to 1986, he chaired the Education Committee. Between 1988 and 1990, he served as leader of the Conservative group on the council. In September 1988 the Conservative Party gained control by using the Conservative mayor's casting vote to become the only inner-city council to be controlled by the Conservatives.

When Bradford Council was hung, Pickles opted to break the agreement that the parties alternate in the position of Lord Mayor, when he put a Conservative mayor in place again. This effectively gave the Conservatives a majority due to the Lord Mayor's casting vote. To do this, they also broke the tradition that the Lord Mayor kept the status quo.

Whilst at Bradford, Pickles announced a five-year plan to cut the council's budget by £50m, reduce the workforce by a third, privatise services and undertake council departmental restructures, many of which proved controversial. A book, The Pickles Papers, by Tony Grogan, was written about this period in Pickles' life.

== Parliamentary career ==
Pickles was elected as Member of Parliament for Brentwood and Ongar in 1992.

At the 2001 general election, the independent politician Martin Bell, who had been the MP for Tatton, having run a campaign of "anti-sleaze", stood against Pickles, due to accusations that the Peniel Pentecostal Church had infiltrated the local Conservative branch. Pickles's vote was reduced from 45.4% to 38%, but he retained his seat by a margin of 2,821 votes (6.5%) becoming elected with 38% of the votes against Bell's 31.5%.

Pickles served as Shadow Minister for Transport and Shadow Minister for London from September 2001 to June 2002, then as Shadow Minister for Local Government from June 2002.

At the 2005 general election Pickles held his seat with 53.5% of the votes and an increased majority of 11,612 (26.3%), nearly as many as the number of votes for the Liberal Democrats' Gavin Stollar in second place, making this the second-safest Conservative seat in Eastern England, with Pickles taking the third-highest share of the vote cast in the region.

On 2 July 2007, David Cameron, the leader of the Conservatives, appointed Pickles to a reshuffled Shadow Cabinet as shadow Secretary of State for Communities and Local Government. On 30 December 2008, according to reports in The Times, Pickles unveiled plans to "purge town hall 'fat cats'". The Times reported that under the plans "dozens of council chiefs who earn more than Cabinet ministers would lose their jobs as clusters of councils merged their frontline services and backroom operations to provide better value for money." Of the eight highest-earning chief executives listed in The Times' report, six were employed by councils run by the Conservative party, one by Labour and one by the Liberal Democrats.

Pickles was the campaign manager for the successful Crewe and Nantwich by-election in May 2008. Following this, he was promoted to Chairman of the Conservative Party, a post he held from January 2009 to May 2010.

In early 2010, Prime Minister Gordon Brown outlined plans to reform the voting system in the United Kingdom. Pickles defended the first-past-the-post system as resulting in stable government and attacked Brown, claiming he "now wants to fiddle the electoral system" by wanting to change the voting system.

Pickles was the Secretary of State for Communities and Local Government in the coalition government headed by Prime Minister David Cameron from 12 May 2010 to May 2015.

Although a former Eurosceptic, in January 2016 Pickles became a founding member of the group Conservatives For Reform In Europe, a campaign to remain in the European Union on the basis that the EU would be reformed by the negotiations then being led by Prime Minister David Cameron.

In April 2017, Pickles announced he would not stand at the general election the following month. Later that year, he was appointed chairman of the journal Parliamentary Review.

Speaking live to GB News on 4 October 2022, Pickles stated that he had attended his 52nd consecutive Conservative Party Annual Conference that year.

On 31 July 2025, he along with 37 other House of Lords members signed a letter opposing the UK's plan to recognise a State of Palestine: the peers said Palestine “does not meet the international law criteria for recognition of a state, namely, defined territory, a permanent population, an effective government and the capacity to enter into relations with other states”.

== Secretary of State for Communities and Local Government ==
Pickles was appointed as Secretary of State for Communities and Local Government as part of David Cameron's new coalition Government on 12 May 2010, and sworn as a Privy Counsellor on 13 May 2010.

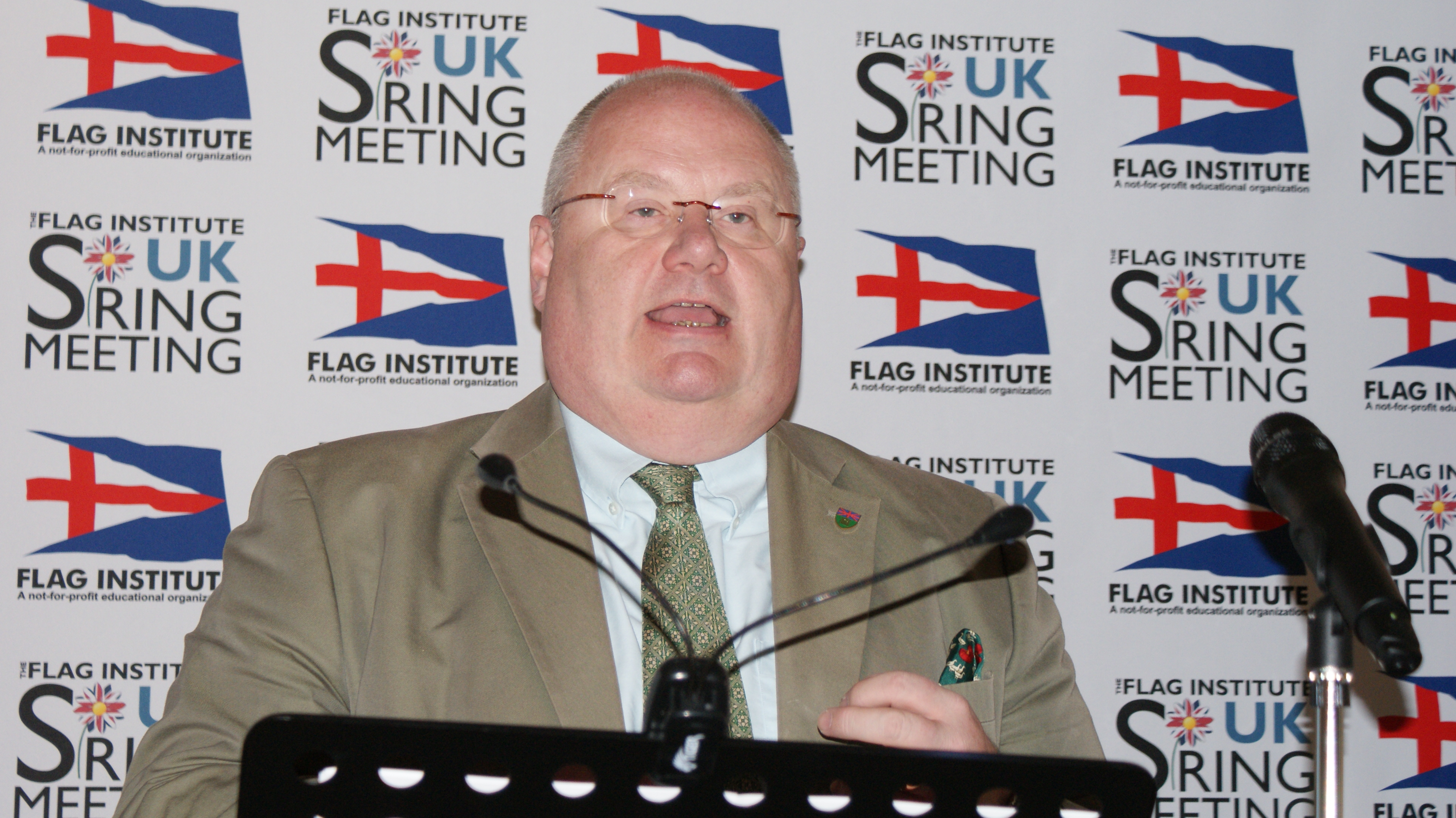
Pickles delivers the keynote address at the Flag Institute Spring Meeting 2011 in Mayfair

In his role as Secretary of State for Communities and Local Government, on 30 July 2010, Pickles announced plans to hand powers where ministers can cap what they deem to be unreasonable increases in council taxes to local people. A consultation began in August 2010 and the powers, which will require legislation, should be in force by March 2012. Pickles said he was determined to reverse the presumption that Whitehall knows best by making local councils directly accountable to the local taxpayer. He said: "If councils want to increase council tax further, they will have to prove the case to the electorate. Let the people decide." Residents would be asked to choose between accepting the rise or rejecting it and instead accepting a rise below inflation with reduced council services. The average council tax on a Band D property increased from £688 a year in 1997/98 to £1,439 for 2010.

In August 2010, Pickles unexpectedly announced the closure of the Audit Commission for England and Wales. The commission had overseen the appointment of independent external auditors for local authorities, and supported audit work to ensure value for money and the certification of Councils' financial accounts. Closure took until March 2015. Commentators questioned whether Whitehall would struggle to check whether council services and finances were about to fall over, particularly when money was channelled through public / private companies. In the aftermath of a series of major financial crises at local authorities such as Woking Borough Council and Thurrock, identified from 2021, senior figures in local government finance identified the critical need to reinstate functions formerly discharged by the Audit Commission and for a strong system leader to oversee councils and local audit.

Pickles did not shun controversy as a Cabinet secretary. In The Observer, Will Hutton appraised his role with regard to local government as follows: "Local government minister Eric Pickles has colluded cheerfully with [Chancellor of the Exchequer] George Osborne to knock local government back to being no more than rat catchers and managers of street lighting. Indeed, they scarcely give them the funds to carry out these activities".

In December 2014, asked in Parliament if people who left their wheelie bins in the street after a collection should be punished, he said they should be flogged -though he also said flogging was too good for them and that leaving the bin in the middle of the road was poor behaviour.

The Rotherham child sexual exploitation scandal was unearthed during Pickles' tenure, and in February 2015 he announced a strategy to implement commissioners at Rotherham Council in the wake of the Casey Report, which had been commissioned in 2014 to investigate child sex abuse in Rotherham. Seven councillors resigned as a result of the damning report, which revealed that the local authority was "wholly dysfunctional" and that the failure to protect 1,400 girls from sexual abuse was a result of "complacency, institutionalised political correctness" and "blatant failures of political and officer leadership".

=== Localism Act ===
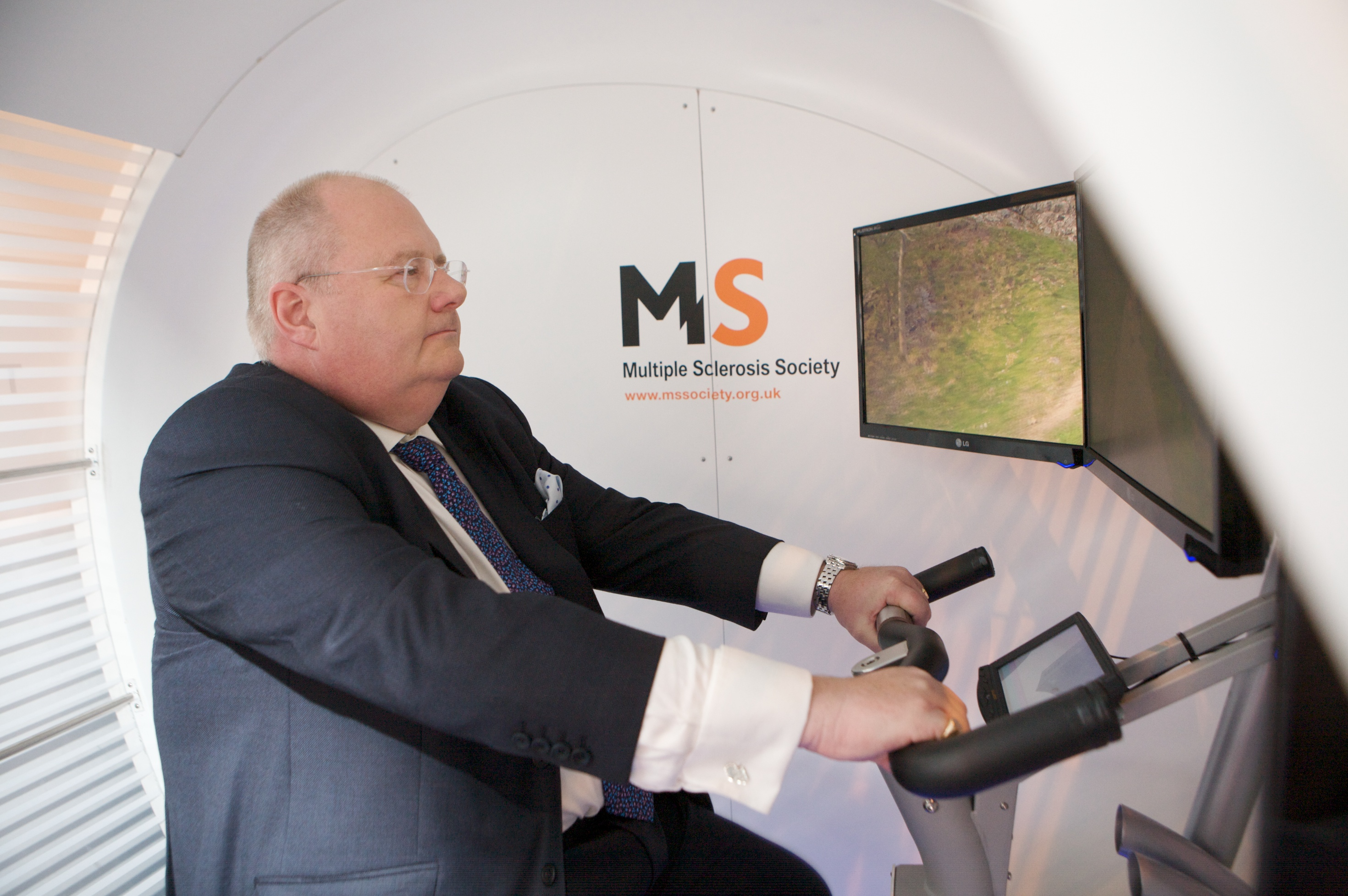
Pickles in 2009

Pickles was responsible for the Localism Act 2011 that changed the powers of local government in England. The measures affected by the Act include more elected mayors and referendums. The Localism Act opens with Part 1, Chapter 1(1), under the heading "Local authority's general power of competence", "A local council has power to do anything that individuals generally may do".

The bill, introduced by Pickles, received first reading on 13 December 2010. The Bill completed the third reading in the House of Lords on 31 October 2011. The bill received royal assent on 15 November 2011.

The bill was quickly undermined, however, after it was published on 13 December. One of the claims made for it is that it would "give local communities real control over housing and planning decisions", but on the same day, Pickles issued a decision in a planning appeal. The National Grid had applied to Tewkesbury Borough Council to build a gas plant just outside Tirley in Gloucestershire. The installation would occupy more than 16 acres and the application had been opposed by more than 1,000 residents in a sparsely populated rural area, by 12 parish councils and by every member of the planning committee of the local planning authority. Rejecting the local opposition, Pickles chose to grant permission to build the gas plant.

In April 2014, South Norfolk MP Richard Bacon welcomed the decision that Pickles and the DCLG would have final say over the building of wind turbines. By June 2014, Pickles had intervened on 12 windfarm projects, rejecting 10 of them, against the recommendations from planning inspectors, rising to 50 refusals by October 2014.

=== Council prayers ===
On 10 February 2012, the National Secular Society obtained a High Court judicial review of Christian prayers held as part of formal local council meetings, which councillors disagreeing with the practice had to attend if not wishing to walk out discourteously. Mr Justice Ouseley ruled: "The saying of prayers as part of the formal meeting of a Council is not lawful under s. 111 of the Local Government Act 1972, and there is no statutory power permitting the practice to continue. I do not think the 1972 Act should be interpreted as permitting the religious views of one group of councillors, however sincere or large in number, to exclude, or even to a modest extent, to impose burdens on or even to mark out those who do not share their views and do not wish to participate in their expression of them. They are all equally elected councillors". Prayers were permitted to be held before the start of the formal agenda.

Eric Pickles vowed to reverse the High Court decision, despite a YouGov poll which found that 55% of people were against councils holding prayers, and 26% in favour. Eric Pickles brought forward his Localism Act, due to become law in April 2012, and made it law on 17 February 2012, saying that he was 'effectively reversing' the High Court decision.

Keith Porteous Wood, executive director of the National Secular Society, said: "A number of senior lawyers have expressed doubt whether the Localism Act will, as Mr Pickles hopes, make prayers lawful, and the Act was clearly not passed with that express intention. His powers to pass legislation are not, as he implies, untrammelled. Council prayers increasingly look set to become a battle between the Government and the courts at ever higher levels". The Localism Act states that "a local authority has power to do anything that individuals generally may do". Eric Pickles wrote to faith leaders, local authority leaders, and the Society of Local Council Clerks, and telling parish councils "Once the power is in place, eligible parish councils will be able to include prayers as part of their formal business". In April 2013, referring to the issue of prayers in council meetings, Pickles said in a speech at the Conservative Spring Forum that "militant atheists" should accept that Britain is a Christian country. In 2015 the Local Government (Religious Observances) Act, which was welcomed by Pickles, authorised councils to hold prayers at the start of sessions.

=== Troubled Families ===
Pickles led the Troubled Families Programme designed to turn around 120,000 dysfunctional families, at a cost of around £400 million. According to David Cameron, these families were responsible for 'a large proportion of the problems in society'. The families were selected for having five of seven measures of social and economic deprivation. Pickles claimed repeatedly that these families cost the state £9 billion per annum. In March 2015 Pickles declared the programme a 'triumph' in the House of Commons after it allegedly 'turned around' 105,600 families of 117,910 processed and saved £1.2 billion per annum. The £1.2 billion per annum savings was a hypothetical number based on assumptions that alleged improvements in behaviour would be sustained and depended on removing the high costs associated with disabled children and chronically sick, unemployed adults.

The Evaluation by the National Institute for Economic and Social Research was published on 17 October 2016. The report found that there had been "no significant impact" of the scheme. A press release from NIESR stated, "we were unable to find consistent evidence that the programme had any significant or systematic impact". The Times reported the following day, "the report was published quietly last night after complaints from Whitehall insiders that it was being suppressed".

The Public Accounts Committee published its report on 19 December 2016. They concluded that the delay in publication had been unacceptable, that DCLG had failed to demonstrate that the programme had any significant impact and that the terminology of saying that the families had been "turned around" was misleading given that many of the families had continuing problems after a result had been claimed. The PAC chairwoman, Meg Hillier, commented that the report was "far more serious" than "a slap on the wrist" for ministers.

=== Flooding of the Somerset Levels ===
From December 2013 onwards the Somerset Levels suffered severe flooding as part of the wider 2013–2014 Atlantic winter storms in Europe and subsequent 2013–2014 United Kingdom winter floods.

There were public calls for the rivers Parrett and Tone, in particular, to be dredged. The Environment Agency was blamed for not having dredged the major river channels of the Levels. The Environment Agency and others pointed out that it would be more effective to spend money on delaying floodwaters upstream, and that increasing the capacity of rivers by dredging would be of no significant use; the Environment Secretary defended the Agency. Roger Falconer, Professor of Water Management at Cardiff University, and other hydrologists made clear that dredging did not offer a useful solution to flooding on the Somerset Levels.

On 7 February, the Environment Secretary needed an urgent operation and handed over the flood management to Eric Pickles. Pickles then appeared on The Andrew Marr Show and apologised "unreservedly" for not dredging the Somerset Levels and said that "the government may have relied too much on the advice" of the Environment Agency. The head of the Environment Agency Lord Chris Smith rejected the criticism of his organisation. The Environment Secretary protested in the strongest possible terms to the Prime Minister about Pickles' "grandstanding".

== Controversies ==
=== Second home ===
On 26 March 2009, Pickles appeared on the political debate programme Question Time in Newcastle. While discussing the controversy over Tony McNulty (who had recently admitted claiming expenses on a second home, occupied by his parents, only 8 miles away from his primary residence), Pickles admitted he claimed a second home allowance because he lived 37 miles from Westminster and needed to leave his constituency house in Brentwood at 5.30 am to get to Westminster for 9.30 am, given that he tended to get home at midnight or 1 am, although the standard time for commuters from this region is usually ninety minutes. He went on to say that it was "no fun" commuting into London from where he lived. In response to Pickles's comments that he "had to be there [the House of Commons] on time", Question Time host David Dimbleby, replied "Like a job, in other words?" and fellow panellist Caroline Lucas added 'welcome to the real world', both of which prompted amusement and applause amongst the audience.

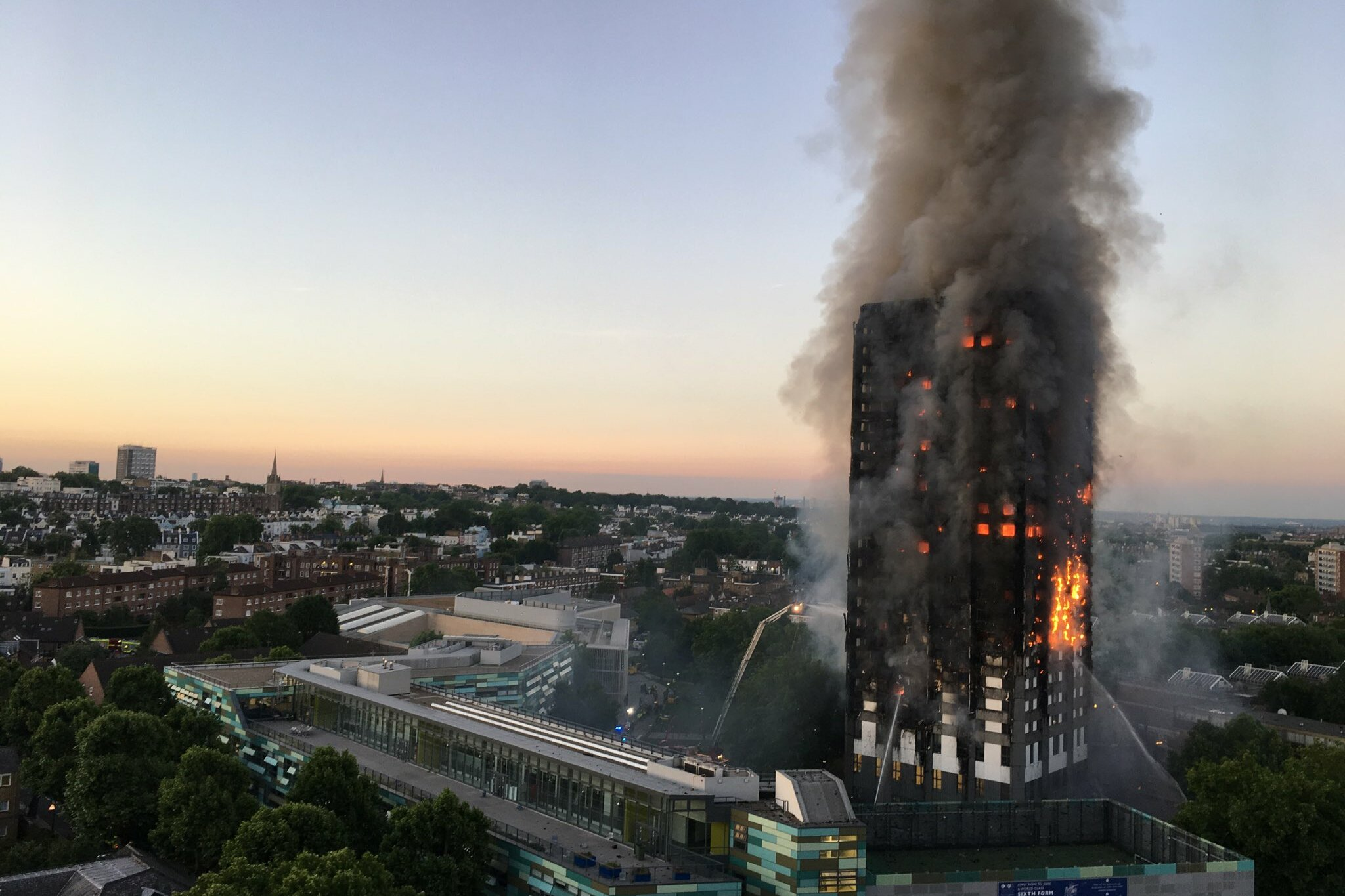
During his tenure as Housing Secretary, Pickles permitted Grenfell Tower in London to be clad using combustable cladding, something he was heavily criticised for during the subsequent enquiry following a fire at the tower in June 2017. His conduct during the enquiry was also criticised, with Pickles urging the enquiry not to "waste my time" and "use time wisely", as well as getting the number of deaths wrong

Pickles was asked to pay back £300 following the MP's expenses scandal, which he had claimed for cleaning.

=== Grenfell Tower Inquiry controversy ===
The Grenfell Tower fire, which killed 72 people and destroyed Grenfell Tower in North Kensington, London, happened on 14 June 2017 when Pickles was no longer the minister responsible for housing, but the tower's renovation using flammable cladding was designed and agreed while he was housing minister.

On 7 April 2022, Pickles gave evidence to the Grenfell Tower Inquiry based on his experience as Secretary of State for Housing from 2010 to 2015. He went on to challenge the inquiry not to waste his time while giving evidence, before getting the death toll from the disaster wrong. He later apologised, claiming he "misspoke".

The Grenfell Tower Inquiry final report, published on 4 September 2024, was critical of Pickles and his government department for failing to act on a 2013 coroner recommendation to improve cladding fire safety regulations and for his enthusiastic support of a programme to slash regulations which dominated department thinking. This led to calls for him to resign from the House of Lords and as a government ethics adviser.

== Personal life ==
Pickles married Irene Coates in 1976 in Staincliffe, a district of Batley in West Yorkshire.

== Honours ==
- Eric Pickles was sworn in as a member of Her Majesty's Most Honourable Privy Council in 2010. This gave him the Honorific Prefix "The Right Honourable" and after Ennoblement the Post Nominal Letters "PC" for Life.
- On 22 May 2015 it was announced that Pickles was to be appointed a Knight Bachelor.
- He was nominated for a Life Peerage by Theresa May on 18 May 2018. On 18 June 2018 he was created Baron Pickles, of Brentwood and Ongar in the County of Essex. He sits on the Conservative Party benches in the House of Lords.

== Sources ==
- Grogan, Tony (1989). The Pickles Papers. Bradford: 1 in 12 Publications. ISBN 0-948994-04-5. (free electronic edition, October 1996).

Parliament of the United Kingdom
Preceded by Robert McCrindle	Member of Parliament for Brentwood and Ongar; 1992–2017	Succeeded by Alex Burghart
Political offices
Preceded by Theresa May as Shadow Secretary of State for Transport, Local Government and the Regions	Shadow Secretary of State for Local Government and the Regions; 2002	Succeeded by David Davis as Shadow Secretary of State for the Office of the Deputy Prime Minister
Preceded by David Davis as Shadow Secretary of State for the Office of the Deputy Prime Minister	Shadow Secretary of State for Local Government; 2003–2005	Succeeded by Caroline Spelman as Shadow Secretary of State for Local Government Affairs and Communities
Preceded by Caroline Spelman	Shadow Secretary of State for Communities and Local Government; 2007–2009	Succeeded by Caroline Spelman
Preceded by John Denham	Secretary of State for Communities and Local Government; 2010–2015	Succeeded by Greg Clark
Preceded by The Baroness Warsi as Minister of State for Faith and Communities	Minister of State for Faith; 2014–2015	Position abolished
Preceded by Andrew Burns	United Kingdom Special Envoy for Post-Holocaust Issues; 2015–	Incumbent
Preceded by Kenneth Clarke	United Kingdom Anti-Corruption Champion; 2015–	Incumbent
Party political offices
Preceded by Caroline Spelman	Chairman of the Conservative Party; 2009–2010	Succeeded by The Lord Feldman of Elstree; The Baroness Warsi
Orders of precedence in the United Kingdom
Preceded by The Lord Tyrie	Gentlemen; Baron Pickles	Followed by The Lord Lilley
