= Donald Tebbit =

British diplomat (1920–2010)

Sir Donald Claude Tebbit GCMG (4 May 1920 – 25 September 2010) was a British diplomat.

He attended The Perse School, Cambridge, and Trinity Hall, Cambridge. He was president of the Trinity Hall alumni association, the Trinity Hall Association, 1984–1985.

He was Chief Clerk of the Foreign and Commonwealth Office from 1973 to 1976, and British High Commissioner to Australia 1976–80.

In 2009 he was appointed a Vice-President of the Britain–Australia Society. On 25 September 2010 he died at age 90.

Diplomatic posts
Preceded by Sir Morrice James	High Commissioner to Australia; 1976–1980	Succeeded by Sir John Mason
