= Richard Whittington (diplomat) =

Sir Richard Whittington, KCMG, CBE (22 June 1905 – 18 August 1975) was a British diplomat. He was British Ambassador to Thailand from 1957 to 1961.
