= Sherard Cowper-Coles =

British diplomat

Sir Sherard Cowper-Coles KCMG LVO
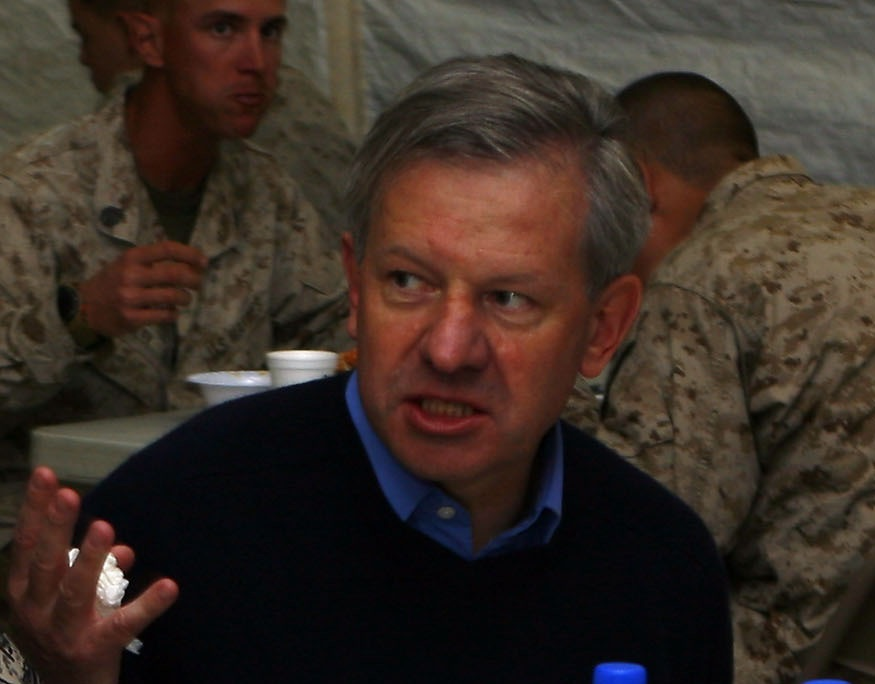
- Cowper-Coles in Afghanistan in 2009

British Ambassador to Afghanistan
- In office 2007–2009
- Monarch: Elizabeth II
- Prime Minister: Gordon Brown
- Preceded by: Stephen Evans
- Succeeded by: Mark Sedwill

British Ambassador to Saudi Arabia
- In office 2003–2006
- Monarch: Elizabeth II
- Prime Minister: Tony Blair
- Preceded by: Sir Derek Plumbly
- Succeeded by: Sir William Patey

British Ambassador to Israel
- In office 2001–2003
- Monarch: Elizabeth II
- Prime Minister: Tony Blair
- Preceded by: Francis Cornish
- Succeeded by: Simon McDonald

Personal details
- Born: 8 January 1955 (age 71) London, England
- Spouse: Bridget Mary Elliott
- Education: Hertford College, Oxford
- Occupation: Diplomat

Sir Sherard Louis Cowper-Coles KCMG LVO (/ˈʃɛrərd ˈlwiː ˌkuːpər ˈkoʊlz/ SHERR-ərd LWEE KOO-pər KOHLZ; born 8 January 1955) is a British former diplomat, currently serving as Vice President and Corporate Secretary of the Asian Infrastructure Investment Bank (AIIB). He was the Foreign Secretary's Special Representative to Afghanistan and Pakistan in 2009–2010. After leaving the Foreign Office, he worked briefly for BAE Systems as international business development director. He left BAE Systems in 2013 to become senior adviser to the group chairman and group chief executive of HSBC, before joining the AIIB in 2025. He is also president of the Jane Austen Society.

== Early life and education ==
Sherard Cowper-Coles is the son of Sherard Hamilton Cowper-Coles and Dorothy (née Short). His grandfather, the metallurgist Sherard Osborn Cowper-Coles, was the son of naval inventor Captain Cowper Phipps Coles. He was educated at Freston Lodge School, New Beacon School, Tonbridge School and Hertford College, Oxford, where he read classics.

In 1982, he married Bridget Mary Elliott. Her father was Neil Elliott, a prominent land agent whose brother was the actor Denholm Elliott and whose father had been assassinated while serving as Solicitor-General to the Mandatory Government of Palestine in 1933 and who was buried in Mount Zion Cemetery, Jerusalem. The couple have four sons, Henry Sherard, Rupert Neil, Frederick Peter and Myles Philip, and one daughter, Minna Louise.

In 2011, he divorced Bridget Mary Elliott and married Jasmine Zerinini, a French diplomat, in 2012. They have a daughter, Louise Elizabeth.

== Diplomatic career ==
Cowper-Coles entered the diplomatic service in 1977. He was Third Secretary and later Second Secretary in Cairo, 1980–83, First Secretary in the Planning Staff of the Foreign and Commonwealth Office, 1983–85; Private Secretary to the Permanent Under-secretary of State, 1985–87, First Secretary in Washington, 1987–91, Assistant in the Security Policy Department of the FCO, 1991–93, Resident Associate, International Institute for Strategic Studies, 1993–94; Head of the Hong Kong Department of the FCO, 1994–97, Political Counsellor in Paris, 1997–99; Principal Private Secretary to Robin Cook, the Secretary of State for Foreign and Commonwealth Affairs, 1999–2001.

His first role as a head of mission was in Tel Aviv as the British Ambassador to Israel from 2001 to 2003. He was next appointed Ambassador to Saudi Arabia in Riyadh, a post that he held until 2006. From 15 May 2007 until April 2009, he served as Ambassador to Afghanistan in Kabul.

In February 2009, it was announced that he would be taking up a new role as special representative of the UK Foreign Secretary to Afghanistan and Pakistan.

He attracted controversy in October 2008 when a leaked French diplomatic cable suggested he had been sharply critical of Karzai and US policy. While insisting Britain should support the US, he was quoted as saying: "We should tell them that we want to be part of a winning strategy, not a losing one."

This memo leak occurred the same week another additional memo was leaked concerning fellow British ambassador, Sir Nigel Sheinwald's comments with regard to United States Senator Barack Obama. Both leaks concerned foreign policy and occurred in the final weeks of the 2008 US presidential election.

In early 2010, it was reported that he clashed with senior NATO and US officials over his insistence that the military-driven counter-insurgency effort was headed for failure, and that talks with the Taliban should be prioritised.

On 21 June 2010, the British high commission announced he had taken "extended leave" from his position in Afghanistan. Following comments from the Foreign Secretary, William Hague, it appeared unlikely he would return to the post.

== Post-diplomatic career ==
In 2011, Sir Sherard Cowper-Coles became BAE Systems' international business development director, focusing on the Middle East and south-east Asia. He is a committee member of the Saudi-British Society.

His appointment at BAE caused some controversy, since he is thought to have "had a profound effect" on the decision by Robert Wardle, then director of the UK's Serious Fraud Office, to end an investigation into BAE's allegedly corrupt dealings with Saudi Arabia.

In 2013 and 2014, he participated in the Bilderberg Conferences.

From 2019-2025 he was also the chair of the China-Britain Business Council, an organisation promoting trade relationships between China and the UK.

== Honours ==
Cowper-Coles was appointed a Lieutenant of the Royal Victorian Order (LVO) in 1991 and made a Companion of the Order of St Michael and St George (CMG) in the 1997 Birthday Honours and a Knight Commander of the Order in the 2004 Birthday Honours.

== Published works ==
- (2011) Cables from Kabul: The Inside Story of the West's Afghanistan Campaign, London: HarperPress. ISBN 978-0-00743-202-8
- (2012) Ever the Diplomat: Confessions of a Foreign Office Mandarin, London: HarperPress. ISBN 978-0-00743-600-2

Diplomatic posts
Preceded by Sir John Grant	Principal Private Secretary to the Foreign Secretary; 1999–2001	Succeeded by Simon McDonald
Preceded by Francis Cornish	British Ambassador to Israel; 2001–2003	Succeeded by Simon McDonald
Preceded by Sir Derek Plumbly	British Ambassador to Saudi Arabia; 2003–2006	Succeeded by Sir William Patey
Preceded by Stephen Evans	British Ambassador to Afghanistan; 2007–2009	Succeeded by Mark Sedwill
