= Thomas Anthony Keith Elliott =

British diplomat (1921–1976)

British Ambassador to Israel
- In office November 1975 – 28 August 1976
- Monarch: Elizabeth II
- Preceded by: Sir Bernard Ledwidge
- Succeeded by: Sir John Mason

Personal details
- Born: 27 May 1921 Burford, Oxfordshire, England
- Died: 28 August 1976 (aged 55) Caesarea, Israel
- Education: Balliol College, Oxford

Thomas Anthony Keith Elliott (27 May 1921 – 28 August 1976) was a British diplomat.

== Biography ==
Thomas Anthony Keith Elliott was born on 27 May 1921 in Burford, Oxfordshire, England.

He was the British Ambassador to Israel from November 1975 to 28 August 1976.

Elliott drowned on 28 August 1976 whilst swimming off the coast of Caesarea, Israel.
