= David Manning =

British diplomat (born 1949)

Sir David Manning GCMG KCVO
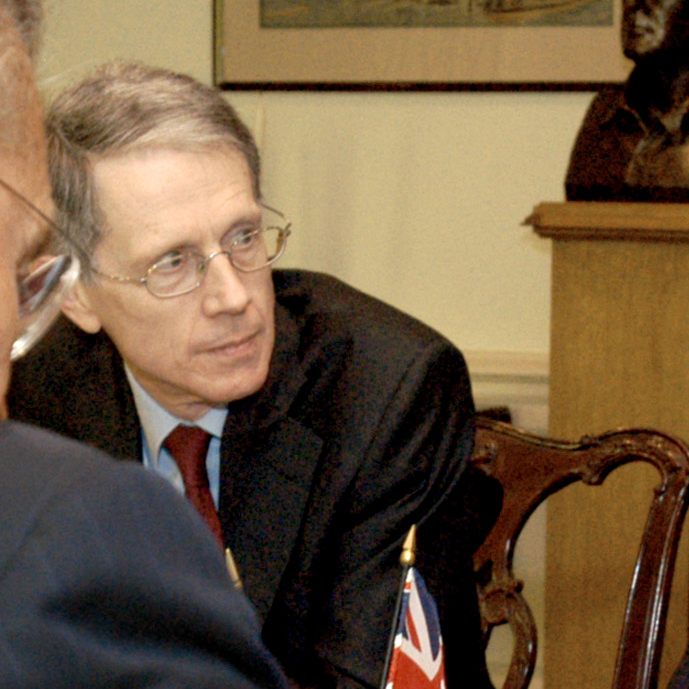
- Sir David Manning during an interview with Donald Rumsfeld and Jack Straw, on 9 May 2005.

British Ambassador to the United States
- In office 2003–2007
- Monarch: Elizabeth II
- President: George W. Bush
- Prime Minister: Tony Blair; Gordon Brown
- Preceded by: Christopher Meyer
- Succeeded by: Nigel Sheinwald

UK Permanent Representative on the North Atlantic Council
- In office 2001–2001
- Prime Minister: Tony Blair
- Preceded by: Sir John Goulden
- Succeeded by: Sir Emyr Jones Parry

British Ambassador to Israel
- In office 1995–1998
- Prime Minister: John Major; Tony Blair
- Preceded by: Robert Andrew Burns
- Succeeded by: Francis Cornish

Personal details
- Born: 5 December 1949 (age 76)
- Education: Oriel College, Oxford; Paul H. Nitze School of Advanced International Studies

Sir David Geoffrey Manning (born 5 December 1949) is a British former diplomat who was British Ambassador to the United States from 2003 to 2007. He authored the "Manning Memo", which summarised the details of a meeting between US president George W. Bush and British prime minister Tony Blair during the run-up to the invasion of Iraq in 2003. From 2009 to 2019 Manning worked as an adviser in the royal household of the Duke and Duchess of Cambridge and the Duke and Duchess of Sussex.

== Life and career ==
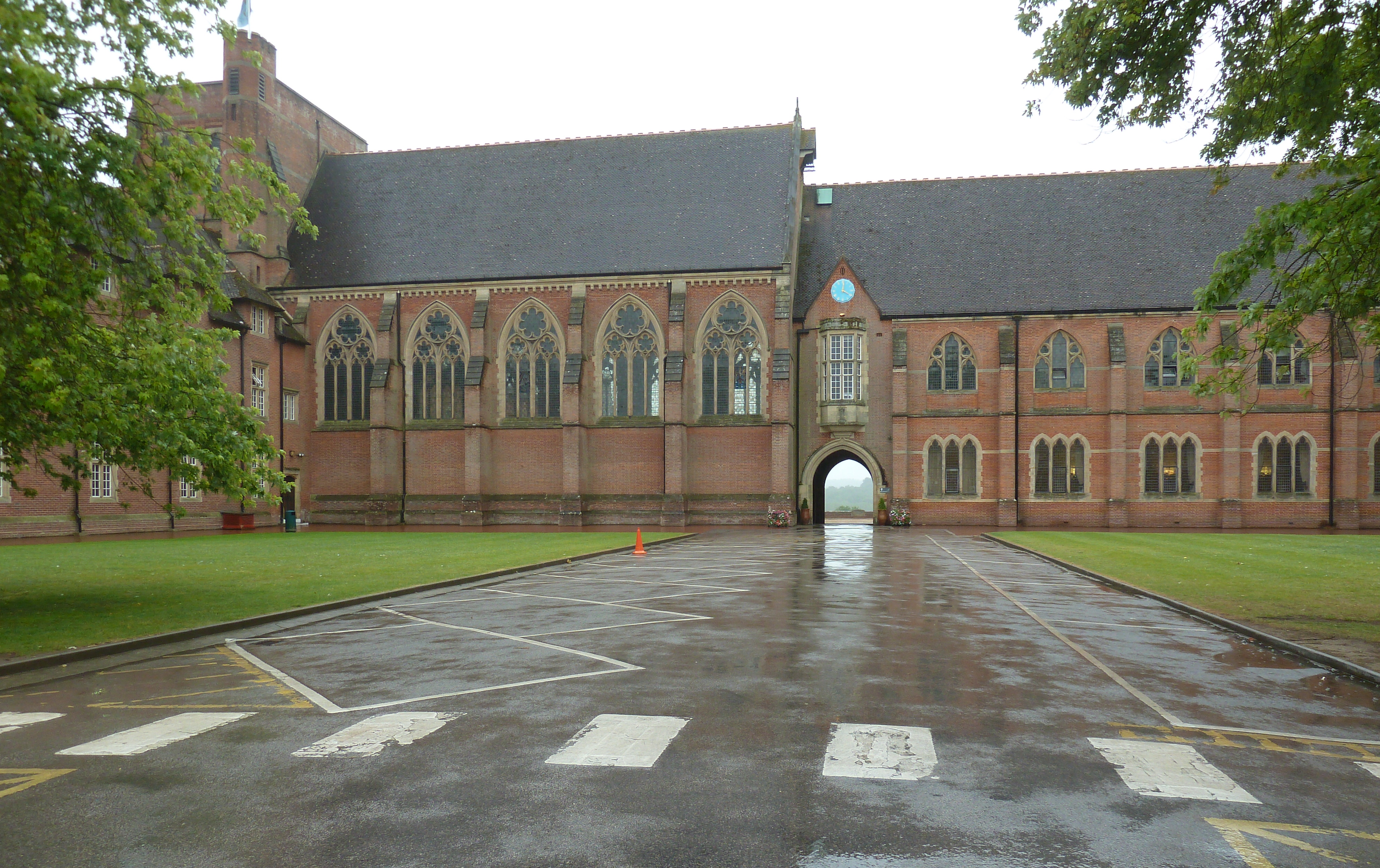
Ardingly College

Manning was educated at Ardingly College and went on to study at Oriel College, Oxford, and at the Paul H. Nitze School of Advanced International Studies of the Johns Hopkins University. He began his career as a civil servant in the Foreign and Commonwealth Office (FCO) in 1972. He has served in UK Embassies in Warsaw, New Delhi, Paris, and Moscow, and within the FCO he has worked on the Central American desk, the Russian desk and held several senior positions. He has represented the UK in Brussels and also at the International Conference on the former Yugoslavia in 1994.

Between 1995 and 1998, he was British ambassador to Israel; from 2001, he was a foreign policy adviser to British prime minister Tony Blair. During this time he developed a close relationship with his counterpart, then US National Security Advisor Condoleezza Rice. Blair selected him to replace Christopher Meyer as the British ambassador to the United States. Manning took up the post in 2003. Ambassador Manning visited numerous states, as well as the US territory of Puerto Rico, during his term as Ambassador to the United States and was instrumental in planning Queen Elizabeth's most recent visit.

=== 2003 Iraq War ===
In the weeks before the United States-led invasion of Iraq, as the United States and Britain pressed for a second United Nations resolution condemning Iraq, President Bush met with Tony Blair. During a private two-hour meeting in the Oval Office on 31 January 2003, Bush made it clear to Prime Minister Tony Blair of Britain that he, Bush, was determined to invade Iraq without the second resolution, or even if international arms inspectors failed to find unconventional weapons, stated a confidential memo about the meeting written by Manning and reviewed by The New York Times.

At their meeting, Bush and Blair candidly expressed their doubts that chemical, biological or nuclear weapons would be found in Iraq in the coming weeks, the memo said. The president spoke as if an invasion was unavoidable. The two leaders discussed a timetable for the war, details of the military campaign and plans for the aftermath of the war. The memo also says the president raised three possible ways of provoking a confrontation, including the most controversial:

"The U.S. was thinking of flying U2 reconnaissance aircraft with fighter cover over Iraq, painted in U.N. colours," the memo says, attributing the idea to Mr. Bush. "If Saddam fired on them, he would be in breach".

His close relationship with the Prime Minister suggests he has been a key figure in driving British foreign policy in respect of the United States, particularly in the aftermath of the 11 September 2001 attacks and the decision to invade Iraq.

On 30 November 2009 Manning gave evidence to the Iraq Inquiry.

=== Later life ===
He was appointed Knight Grand Cross of the Order of St Michael and St George (GCMG) in the 2008 New Year Honours. Manning retired from Her Majesty's Diplomatic Service in January 2008. Six months later, he joined BG Group (formerly British Gas plc) on a part-time basis at a reported annual salary of £80,000. In 2008 he became a non-executive director of Lockheed Martin and joined the advisory board of Hakluyt & Company, an intelligence company partly staffed by former SIS officers.

At the beginning of 2009 Manning was appointed by Queen Elizabeth II to a "part-time, advisory role" in the newly formed household of Prince William and Prince Harry.

Manning has been elected to the Council of Lloyd's as an external member.

In 2010 Manning formed Gatehouse Advisory Partners Limited in partnership with Sir Jeremy Greenstock. Gatehouse works with organisations to factor geopolitics into their decision making.

He was appointed Knight Commander of the Royal Victorian Order (KCVO) in the 2015 New Year Honours.

=== Posts held ===
- 1972: entered Foreign and Commonwealth Office
- 1972–1974: Foreign and Commonwealth Office (Mexico/Central America Department)
- 1974–1977: Warsaw, Poland (3rd later 2nd Secretary)
- 1977–1980: New Delhi, India (2nd later 1st Secretary)
- 1980–1982: Foreign and Commonwealth Office (Soviet Department)
- 1982–1984: Foreign and Commonwealth Office (Deputy Head of Policy Planning Department)
- 1984–1988: Paris, France (1st Secretary)
- 1988–1990: Counsellor on loan to Cabinet Office
- 1990–1993: Moscow, Russia (Counsellor, Head of Chancery)
- 1993–1994: Foreign and Commonwealth Office (Head of Eastern Department)
- 1994: UK member of Contact Group on Bosnia (International Conference on Former Yugoslavia)
- 1994–1995: Foreign and Commonwealth Office (Head of Policy Planning Staff)
- 1995–1998: Tel Aviv, Israel (Ambassador)
- 1998–2000: Foreign and Commonwealth Office (Deputy Under-Secretary)
- 2001: UK Delegation NATO Brussels (Ambassador)
- 2001–2003: Foreign Policy Adviser to the Prime Minister
- 2003–2007: Washington, USA (Ambassador)

== Honours and awards ==
- Knight Grand Cross of the Order of St Michael and St George (GCMG) – 2008
- Knight Commander of the Royal Victorian Order (KCVO) – 2015, CVO - 2007

Diplomatic posts
Preceded by Sir Andrew Burns	British Ambassador to Israel; 1995–1998	Succeeded by Sir Francis Cornish
Preceded by Sir John Goulden	UK Permanent Representative on the North Atlantic Council; 2001	Succeeded by Sir Emyr Jones Parry
Preceded by Sir Christopher Meyer	British Ambassador to the United States; 2003–2007	Succeeded by Sir Nigel Sheinwald
