= Jane Stapleton =

Jane Stapleton KC FBA (born 26 March 1952) is an Australian academic lawyer with a specialism in tort law. She is an Emeritus Fellow of Balliol College, Oxford, and was the Master of Christ's College, Cambridge from 2016 to 2022.

== Early life and education ==
Stapleton was born in Sydney, Australia, in 1952. She initially studied science, gaining a BSc in chemistry from the University of New South Wales (1974) and a PhD in physical organic chemistry from the University of Adelaide (1977) supervised by John Hamilton Bowie. She came to the UK in the mid-1970s and in 1977 took up a post-doctoral research post at the Department of Chemistry of the University of Cambridge in the laboratory of Dudley Williams.

She then decided to switch to law. She gained an LLB from the Australian National University (1981), followed by a DPhil in private law from the University of Oxford (1984). Her thesis, supervised by Patrick Atiyah, was on compensation for non-traumatic injuries. In 2008 the University of Oxford bestowed upon her a doctorate of civil law.

== Career and research ==
After graduating in law from the ANU she joined the federal Attorney General's Department first in Advisings and then General Counsel. After graduating from Oxford, she briefly lectured at the University of Sydney Law School (1985) and then returned to the UK, where in 1987 she was elected a Fellow of Balliol College and taught at the University of Oxford until 1997.

From 1997 to 2016 she held a Research Chair in Law at the Australian National University where she is now an Emeritus Distinguished Professor.

From 2002 to 2015 she was the Ernest E. Smith Professor of Law at the University of Texas at Austin.

She remained a visiting professor at the University of Oxford from 1997 to 2015. She has held a number of visiting professorships including at Harvard Law School, Columbia Law School, the European University Institute and at the University of Cambridge, where she was an Arthur Goodhart Visiting Professor of Legal Science in 2011-2012.

In March 2016, Stapleton was elected the 38th Master of Christ's College, Cambridge, succeeding Frank Kelly. She assumed the position in September 2016.

Her research has focused on tort law. Other specialisms include comparative law. She retains her early interest in compensation for non-traumatic injuries, such as drug-induced injury and cancer, and her subsequent interest in product liability. She also studies the philosophical principles underlying common law, including duty and the relationship of causation to consequences.

Her publications include the books Disease and the Compensation Debate (1986), Products Liability (1994) and Three Essays on Torts (2021).She was a co-editor of OUP's Clarendon Law Series (1992–97).

== Personal life ==
She is married to Peter Cane, also a law professor.

They have a son and a daughter.

== Awards and honours etc ==
She was awarded the Wedderburn Prize (1995), the William L. Prosser Award of the Association of American Law Schools (2013), the Robert B. McKay Law Professor Award of the American Bar Association (2016) and the John Fleming Prize in Tort Law (2018).

She was elected a Member of the American Law Institute (2000), the first non-US Member of the Institute's Council (2004), an Honorary Bencher of Gray's Inn (2009), a Fellow of the Australian Academy of Law (2010), an Honorary Fellow of St John's College, Cambridge (2012) and a Corresponding Fellow of the British Academy (2015).

In 2018, the University of Adelaide bestowed on her the degree of Doctor of Laws (honoris causa) in acknowledgement of distinguished service to the law in Australia, the United Kingdom and the United States. In 2020 she was appointed an Honorary Queen's Counsel by the Queen.

== Controversy ==
In 2017, she was accused of mishandling an investigation into antisemitic behaviour at Christ's College, after two students were abused by members of the college's sporting societies. In a statement released by the College, she admitted she had given the "seriously misleading impression" the victims' claims had been rejected and apologised to the students.

Academic offices
Preceded by Frank Kelly	Master of Christ's College, University of Cambridge; 2016–2022	Succeeded by Simon McDonald
