= Stephen Bradley (diplomat) =

British former diplomat

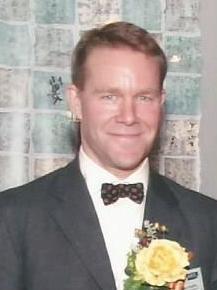

British Consul General to Hong Kong and Macao
- In office December 2003 – March 2008
- Preceded by: Sir James Hodge
- Succeeded by: Andrew Seaton

Personal details
- Born: Stephen Edward Bradley; April 4, 1958 (age 68) New York, United States
- Education: University of Edinburgh (MA)

Stephen Edward Bradley (born 4 April 1958) is a British former diplomat who was Consul-General to Hong Kong from 2003 to 2008. His term of office ended on 4 April 2008. Earlier, from 1988 to 1993, he served in the Hong Kong Government as Deputy Political Adviser. He is known in Chinese as 柏聖文.

As the British Consul General to Hong Kong and Macao, Bradley headed the Consulate General of the United Kingdom, Hong Kong, the largest of Britain's consulates-general and bigger than many embassies, which is responsible for maintaining British ties with Hong Kong and Macao.

Bradley began his career in the Foreign and Commonwealth Office in 1980, and served in Tokyo, Paris and Beijing.

Born in New York, Bradley came to Hong Kong in 1977 to visit his then girlfriend, now wife, Elizabeth. The couple have two children, who are both permanent residents of Hong Kong, and one of whom was born in Hong Kong. Bradley himself was also a permanent resident of the territory, before renouncing it to take up the position as Consul-General. He publicly spoke of his intention to re-apply as a Hong Kong Permanent Resident, and to stay in the territory after his retirement.

An unprecedented open recruitment exercise was held to search for Bradley's successor. Andrew Seaton assumed the position on 22 April 2008.

After leaving the office of HM Consul-General in Hong Kong in 2008, Bradley opted for early retirement in 2009. Since then he has stayed in Hong Kong and entered into the consultancy business in Hong Kong and the People's Republic of China.

Diplomatic posts
Preceded by James Hodge	British Consul-General, Hong Kong; 2004–2008	Succeeded by Andrew Seaton
