= British Consul General to Hong Kong and Macao =

British Consul General to Hong Kong and Macau
- 英國駐香港及澳門總領事
- Foreign, Commonwealth and Development Office; Consulate General of the United Kingdom in Hong Kong
- Member of: Consulate General of the United Kingdom in Hong Kong
- Reports to: Secretary of State for Foreign, Commonwealth and Development Affairs
- Appointer: The British Monarch advised by the Prime Minister
- Formation: July 1997
- First holder: Francis Cornish

The British Consul General to Hong Kong and Macau (Chinese: 英國駐香港及澳門總領事) is the highest diplomat of the United Kingdom sends to Hong Kong and Macau after the Handover of Hong Kong in 1997, managing the Consulate General of the United Kingdom in Hong Kong. To emphasize British-Hong Kong relationship, the Consul-General does not have to report to the British Embassy in Beijing like other Consuls and Ambassadors to China, instead, the Consul-General directly reports to Foreign, Commonwealth and Development Office.

== History ==
Prior to the Handover of Hong Kong to the PRC, the Governor of Hong Kong was the highest-level representative of the British Monarch in Hong Kong.

On 26 September 1996, an agreement was struck between the UK and the PRC, allowing the British to establish a consulate general in Hong Kong.

The Government of the United Kingdom then sent a démarche on 13 June 1997, declaring that Queen Elizabeth II had appointed then-Senior Trade Commissioner Francis Cornish as the first Consul General. Such appointment was ratified by the Chinese Ministry of Foreign Affairs on June 20, and Cornish took office on July 1, becoming the highest-level British diplomat in Hong Kong following the takeover.

== Residence ==
The Governor had lived in Government House which was the official residence of the governor from 1855 to 1997.

The Consul-General had rented the penthouse of The Albany, a luxury residence in Mid-levels Central as his official residence from 1997 to 2004. In 2004, the official residence moved to a Fok family-owned mansion located on Island Road in Deep Water Bay.

The 5th Consul-General, Andrew Seaton, moved the official residence to another flat of a luxury apartment in on Stanley Village Road in Stanley, while still keeping another official residence on Mount Kellett Road on the Peak.

Following the 6th Consul-General Caroline Wilson taking office, she rented a flat in Opus Hong Kong, a luxury residence on Stubbs Road on Victoria Peak as her official residence. However, media estimated that Wilson rented the flat with £60,000/month {approximately HK$720,000), and that it was completely paid for by the British Government, leading to concerns of wasting public funds.

== List of Consul-generals ==
	Portrait	Name	Takes office	Left office	Notes
1		Francis Cornish 鄺富劭	July 1997	November 1997	
2		Sir Robert Andrew Burns 貝恩德爵士	November 1997	June 2000	
3		Sir James Hodge 何進爵士	August 2000	November 2003	
4		Stephen Bradley 柏聖文	December 2003	March 2008	
5		Andrew Seaton 奚安竹	April 2008	September 2012	
6		Caroline Wilson 吳若蘭	October 2012	September 2016	
7		Andrew Heyn 賀恩德	September 2016	December 2020	
(acting)		Tamsin Heath 何思婷	December 2020	July 2021	
8		Brian Davidson 戴偉紳	July 2021	incumbent	

== Related articles ==
- Consulate General of the United Kingdom in Hong Kong
- List of ambassadors of the United Kingdom to China
- Governor of Hong Kong

== Outside links ==
- Consulate General of the United Kingdom in Hong Kong
