= Mark Gooding =

British diplomat

Mark Gooding OBE
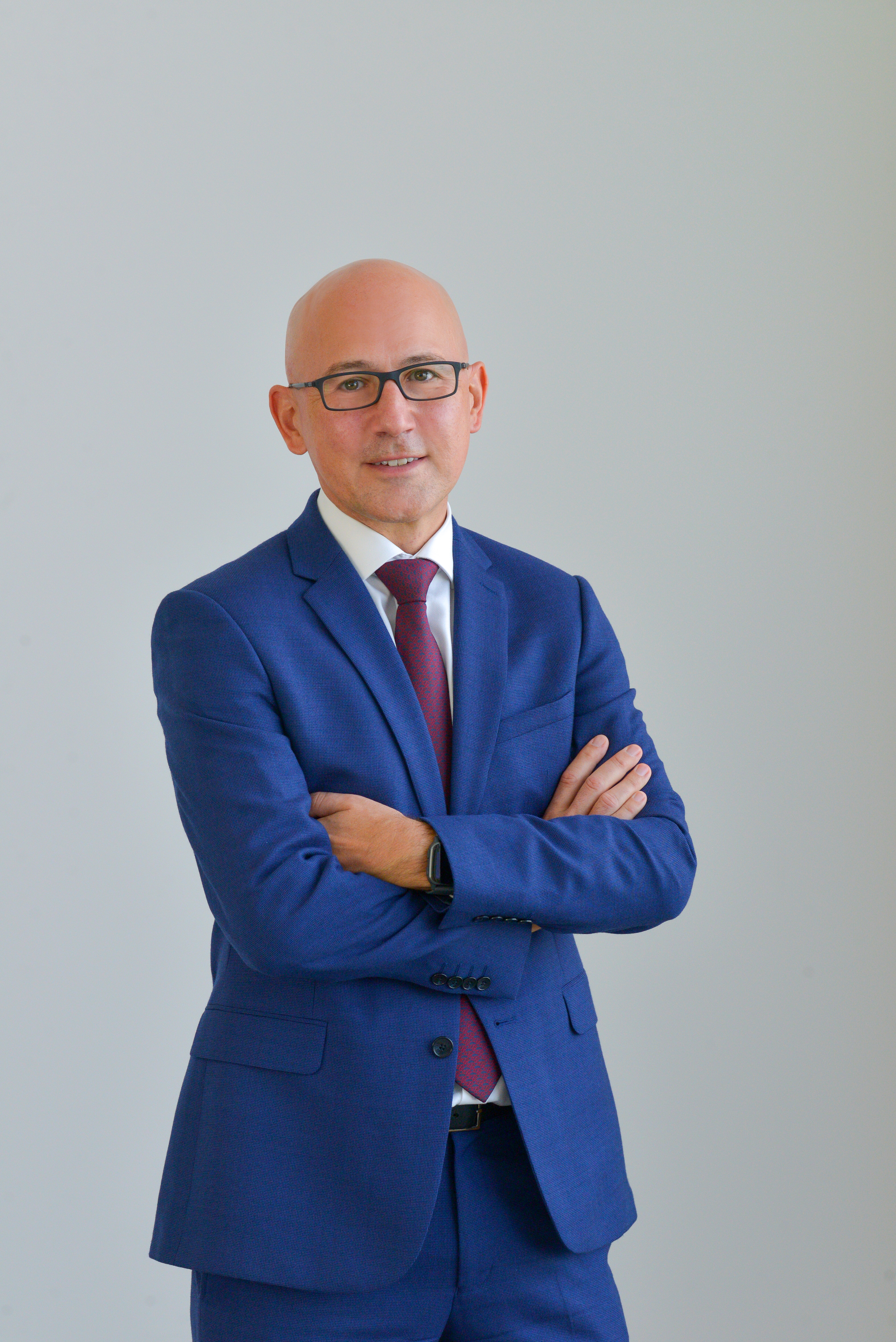

22nd British Ambassador to Thailand
- Incumbent
- Assumed office July 2021
- Monarchs: Elizabeth II; Charles III
- Preceded by: Brian Davidson

Personal details
- Domestic partner: Christopher McCormick

Mark Gooding is a British diplomat who served as the 22nd British Ambassador to Thailand from 2021 to 2026. Gooding previously served as British Ambassador to Cambodia from 2011 to 2013.

== Career ==
Gooding was appointed British Ambassador to Thailand on 9 September 2020.

Gooding supported the passage of the Marriage Equality Act in Thailand in 2024. Following the Act's legalization of same-sex marriage in Thailand in 2025, both the British and American embassies in Bangkok hosted a "United in Love!" event for Pride Month in June.

== Personal life ==
Gooding is openly gay, and is in a civil union with Christopher McCormick. Gooding and McCormick were among the first same-sex couples recognized in a civil union following the passage of the Civil Partnership Act in 2004.
