= John Mason (diplomat, born 1927) =

British diplomat

Sir John Mason KCMG

United Kingdom High Commissioner to Australia
- In office 1980–1984
- Preceded by: Sir Donald Tebbit
- Succeeded by: Sir John Leahy

United Kingdom Ambassador to Israel
- In office 1976–1980
- Preceded by: Thomas Elliott
- Succeeded by: John Robinson

Personal details
- Born: 13 May 1927 Manchester, England, United Kingdom
- Died: 16 March 2008 (aged 80) Sydney, New South Wales, Australia
- Citizenship: Australian
- Spouse: Margaret Newton
- Education: Manchester Grammar School
- Alma mater: Peterhouse, Cambridge
- Occupation: Diplomat

Military service
- Allegiance: United Kingdom
- Branch/service: British Army
- Unit: Royal Ulster Rifles
- Battles/wars: Korean War

Sir John Charles Moir Mason KCMG (13 May 1927 – 16 March 2008) was a British diplomat with Her Majesty's Diplomatic Service. He was the British Ambassador to Israel from 1976 to 1980, and then High Commissioner to Australia from 1980 to 1984. At the end of his term, he and his wife remained in Australia where they became citizens in 1987, and Mason worked as a business executive.

Diplomatic posts
Preceded by Thomas Elliott	British Ambassador to Israel; 1976–1980	Succeeded by John Robinson
Preceded by Sir Donald Tebbit	British High Commissioner to Australia; 1980–1984	Succeeded by Sir John Leahy
