= Simon McDonald, Baron McDonald of Salford =

British diplomat

The Right Honourable The Lord McDonald of Salford GCMG KCVO
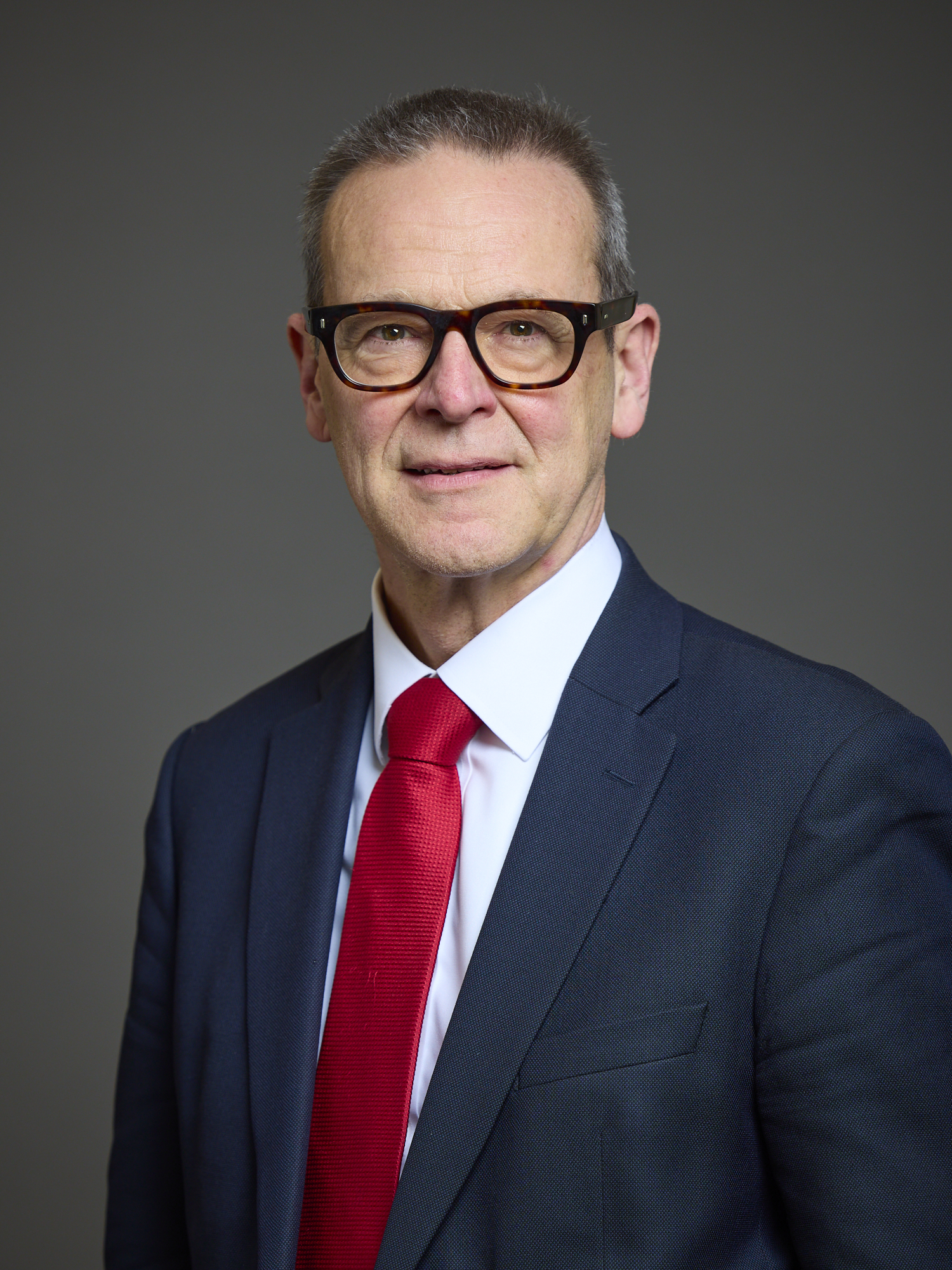
- Official portrait, 2026

Permanent Under-Secretary for Foreign and Commonwealth Affairs Head of HM Diplomatic Service
- In office September 2015 – September 2020
- Foreign Secretary: Philip Hammond; Boris Johnson; Jeremy Hunt; Dominic Raab
- Preceded by: Sir Simon Fraser
- Succeeded by: Sir Philip Barton (Note: as Permanent Under-Secretary of the Foreign, Commonwealth and Development Office)

British Ambassador to Germany
- In office 2010–2015
- Monarch: Elizabeth II
- President: Christian Wulff; Joachim Gauck
- Prime Minister: David Cameron
- Chancellor: Angela Merkel
- Preceded by: Sir Michael Arthur
- Succeeded by: Sir Sebastian Wood

British Ambassador to Israel
- In office 2003–2006
- Monarch: Elizabeth II
- President: Moshe Katzav
- British Prime Minister: Tony Blair
- Israeli Prime Minister: Sharon, Olmert
- Preceded by: Sir Sherard Cowper-Coles
- Succeeded by: Sir Tom Phillips

Member of the House of Lords
- Lord Temporal
- Life peerage 27 January 2021

Personal details
- Born: 9 March 1961 (age 65) Salford, England
- Party: None (crossbencher)
- Spouse: Olivia Wright
- Children: 4 (2 sons, 2 daughters)
- Education: Pembroke College, Cambridge
- Occupation: Diplomat

Simon Gerard McDonald, Baron McDonald of Salford, GCMG, KCVO (born 9 March 1961) is a British former diplomat who was the Permanent Under-Secretary at the Foreign and Commonwealth Office and Head of the Diplomatic Service until September 2020. He was the last professional head of the Foreign & Commonwealth Office before the creation of the Foreign, Commonwealth and Development Office. He has been the Master of Christ's College, Cambridge since September 2022.

In July 2022 McDonald wrote a letter to the Parliamentary Commissioner for Standards stating that denials of previous allegations against Chris Pincher by Prime Minister Boris Johnson were untrue. The letter was described as an "extraordinary, devastating intervention", and was followed by resignations of senior cabinet ministers, ultimately leading to Johnson's announcement of his resignation on 7 July 2022.

== Early life and education ==
McDonald was born on 9 March 1961 in Salford, Lancashire. He was educated at De La Salle College, a direct grant grammar school in Salford. He then studied history at Pembroke College, Cambridge, graduating with a Bachelor of Arts (BA) degree in History. He thereafter gained a Master of Arts degree.

== Career ==
=== Diplomatic career ===
McDonald joined the Foreign and Commonwealth Office (FCO) in 1982 and served in Jeddah, Riyadh, Bonn and Washington, D.C. as well as in London. He was Principal Private Secretary to the Foreign Secretary 2001–03; Ambassador to Israel 2003–06; Director for Iraq at the FCO 2006–07; Foreign Policy Adviser to the Prime Minister and Head of the Overseas and Defence Secretariat at the Cabinet Office 2007–10; and was appointed Ambassador to Germany in October 2010.

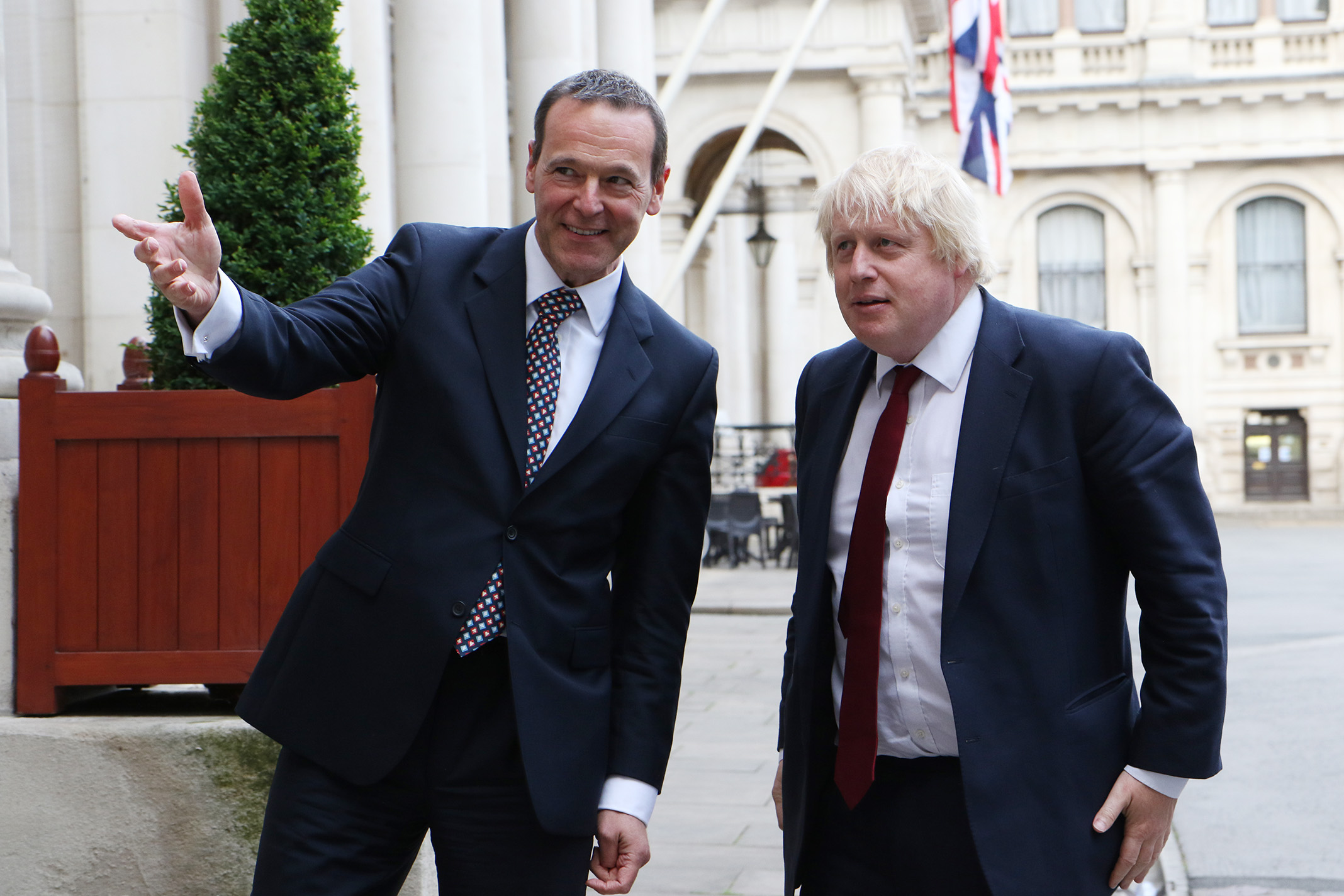
McDonald welcomes the newly-appointed Secretary of State for Foreign and Commonwealth Affairs, Boris Johnson, to the Foreign & Commonwealth Office in London on 13 July 2016.

In September 2015, McDonald became Permanent Under-Secretary in the Foreign and Commonwealth Office and Head of the Diplomatic Service, replacing Sir Simon Fraser. As of 2015, McDonald was paid a salary between £180,000 and £184,999 by the Foreign Office.

Speaking in 2021, after leaving the FCDO, McDonald recalled telling his private secretary on the morning of the referendum in 2016, "I really fear today our country is going to vote to leave the European Union". He also revealed his office to be in "mourning" after the vote but stressed the importance of abiding by civil service impartiality in implementing the referendum result.

In April 2020, McDonald stated to the Foreign Affairs Select Committee that it was a political decision to opt out of an EU scheme to bulk-buy ventilators and protective equipment for NHS workers to respond to the coronavirus pandemic. The comments raised concerns that ministers had put Brexit ahead of responding to the public health crisis. Following comments, Matt Hancock used Downing Street's daily press briefing to state that as far as he knew, there had been no political decision not to participate. McDonald subsequently wrote to the committee chairman, Tom Tugendhat MP, stating that he had "inadvertently and wrongly" misinformed the committee "due to a misunderstanding".

In June 2020, it was announced that McDonald would take early retirement in autumn 2020. The move stemmed from the merger of the Foreign and Commonwealth Office with the Department for International Development. Boris Johnson wanted a new leader of the combined department.

=== House of Lords ===
McDonald was nominated for a life peerage in the 2020 Political Honours. On 27 January 2021, he was created Baron McDonald of Salford, of Pendleton in the City of Salford. He made his maiden speech on 2 March 2021. He sits in the House of Lords as a crossbencher.

=== Academic career ===
On 23 November 2021, McDonald was announced as Master-elect of Christ's College, Cambridge in succession to Jane Stapleton. His term of office began on 1 September 2022.

=== Dominic Raab ===
In April 2023 McDonald said he had to warn Dominic Raab “more than once” about his conduct as foreign secretary. McDonald said Raab was a “tough taskmaster” whose “methods did not help him to achieve what he wanted to do”. McDonald claimed Raab did not listen to the issues raised with him, adding: “He disputed it. He disputed the characterisation.”

=== Chris Pincher ===
Following the resignation of Deputy Chief Whip Chris Pincher over an incident of sexual groping, McDonald wrote in July 2022 to the Parliamentary Commissioner for Standards on previous official complaints made against Pincher, stating that the claim there had been no previous official complaints against Pincher was untrue. A Guardian editorial described the letter as an "extraordinary, devastating intervention", which convinced Chancellor Rishi Sunak, Health Secretary Sajid Javid, and many others to resign from Boris Johnson's government from 5 July 2022.

=== Aid spending ===
In 2025, Lord McDonald warned Rachel Reeves not to cut Britain’s international aid spending. Lord McDonald said it would damage Britain’s global reputation if Reeves chose to reduce aid as she looked for savings in the government's spending review.

=== Antonia Romeo ===
Following the resignation of Chris Wormald as Cabinet Secretary in February 2026, Lord McDonald stated if Antonia Romeo is the leading candidate then ‘due diligence has some way still to go’. He told Channel 4 News: “The due diligence needs to be thorough. If the candidate mentioned in the media is the one, in my view, the due diligence has some way still to go.”.

== Honours ==
McDonald was appointed Companion of the Order of St Michael and St George (CMG) in the 2004 New Year Honours and Knight Commander of the Order of St Michael and St George (KCMG) in the 2014 Birthday Honours for services to British foreign policy and British interests in Germany. He was appointed Knight Commander of the Royal Victorian Order (KCVO) during the Queen's state visit to Germany in June 2015. He was appointed Knight Grand Cross of the Order of St Michael and St George (GCMG) in the 2021 Birthday Honours for services to British foreign policy.

== Family ==
In 1989 Simon McDonald married Olivia, daughter of Sir Patrick Wright, later Baron Wright of Richmond, who had also been Permanent Under-Secretary at the FCO (1986–1991). Simon and Olivia have two sons and two daughters.

== Notes ==
Diplomatic posts
Preceded by Sir Sherard Cowper-Coles	Principal Private Secretary to the Foreign Secretary; 2001–2003	Succeeded by Sir Geoffrey Adams
Preceded by Sir Sherard Cowper-Coles	British Ambassador to Israel; 2003–2006	Succeeded by Sir Tom Phillips
Preceded by Sir Michael Arthur	British Ambassador to Germany; 2010–2015	Succeeded by Sir Sebastian Wood
Government offices
Preceded by Sir Simon Fraser	Permanent Under-Secretary at the Foreign and Commonwealth Office; 2015–2020	Succeeded by Sir Philip Barton
Academic offices
Preceded by Jane Stapleton	Master of Christ's College, University of Cambridge; 2022–present	Incumbent
Orders of precedence in the United Kingdom
Preceded by The Lord Godson	Gentlemen; Baron McDonald of Salford	Followed by The Lord Cruddas
