= Tom Phillips (diplomat) =

British diplomat and former head of studies (born 1950)

Sir Tom Phillips KCMG

British Ambassador to Saudi Arabia
- In office September 2010 – 2012
- Monarch: Elizabeth II
- Prime Minister: David Cameron
- Preceded by: Sir William Patey
- Succeeded by: Sir John Jenkins

British Ambassador to Israel
- In office 2006–2010
- Monarch: Elizabeth II
- Prime Minister: Tony Blair; Gordon Brown
- Preceded by: Sir Simon McDonald
- Succeeded by: Matthew Gould

British High Commissioner to Uganda
- In office 2000–2002
- Monarch: Elizabeth II
- Prime Minister: Tony Blair
- Preceded by: Michael Cook
- Succeeded by: Adam Wood

Personal details
- Born: Tom Richard Vaughan Phillips; 21 June 1950 (age 75)
- Spouse: Anne de la Motte (m. 1986)
- Children: 2

Sir Tom Richard Vaughan Phillips, KCMG (born 21 June 1950) is a diplomat who served as Commandant of the Royal College of Defence Studies from 2014 to 2018.

== Career ==
Educated at the University of Exeter, Jesus College, Oxford, and Wolfson College, Oxford, Phillips spent three years as a journalist and then undertook diplomatic postings in Zimbabwe, Israel, and the United States of America. Phillips became British High Commissioner to Uganda in 2000, UK Special Representative for Afghanistan in 2002 and British Ambassador to Israel in 2006. He went on to be British Ambassador to the Kingdom of Saudi Arabia in 2010 and Commandant of the Royal College of Defence Studies from 2014 to 2018. He is an Honorary Fellow of St Edmund's College, Cambridge.

== Family ==
In 1986 Phillips married Anne de la Motte; they have two sons.

Diplomatic posts
Preceded by Michael Cook	British High Commissioner to Uganda; 2000–2002	Succeeded by Adam Wood
Preceded by Sir Simon McDonald	British Ambassador to Israel; 2006–2010	Succeeded by Matthew Gould
Preceded by Sir William Patey	British Ambassador to Saudi Arabia; 2010–2012	Succeeded by Sir John Jenkins
Military offices
Preceded by Sir David Bill	Commandant of the Royal College of Defence Studies; 2014–2018	Succeeded by Sir Simon Gass
