= Brian Davidson =

British diplomat (born 1964)

His Excellency Brian Davidson CMG
- Davidson in 2024

8th British Consul General to Hong Kong and Macao
- Incumbent
- Assumed office July 2021
- Deputy: Tamsin Heath; Stuart Brown (acting); Sarah Robinson (acting, regular)
- Preceded by: Andrew Heyn; Tamsin Heath (acting)

22nd British Ambassador to Thailand
- In office June 2016 – June 2021
- Preceded by: Mark Kent
- Succeeded by: Mark Gooding

Personal details
- Born: 28 April 1964 (age 62) Holywood, Northern Ireland
- Education: Trinity College, Cambridge
- Occupation: Diplomat

Brian John Davidson CMG (Chinese: 戴偉紳; born 28 April 1964) is a British diplomat who is the British Consul General to Hong Kong and Macao as of July 2021.

== Biography ==
Davidson grew up in Holywood, Northern Ireland, and was awarded a Bachelor of Arts (Honours) in Law at Trinity College, Cambridge before joining the Foreign and Commonwealth Office in 1985. Although initially posted as a desk officer for Czechoslovakia and Bulgaria in the Eastern European Department, Davidson undertook Mandarin Chinese language training at the School of Oriental and African Studies before his appointment as Second Secretary for Political/Information at the British Embassy in Beijing from 1988 to 1992. From 1992 to 1993 Davidson worked as an analyst on terrorism and international security for the Cabinet Office before being appointed as the Head of the China Section in the Far Eastern and Pacific Department of the FCO until 1996.

From 1996 to 2000, Davidson was posted to the High Commission in Canberra, Australia as a First Secretary. In 2001, Davidson was appointed Deputy Head of Mission at the British Embassy Vilnius, Lithuania, serving until 2004. From March 2005 to September 2006, Davidson was seconded to the private sector as Deputy Chief Executive of International Financial Services London. In October 2006 Davidson returned to China when he was posted as Consul General in Guangzhou, where he served until December 2010. In January 2011 was promoted to be Consul General in Shanghai. In December 2013, Davidson officiated during an official visit to Shanghai by Royal Navy ship HMS Daring and assisted in the rediscovery of the graves of four members of the Royal Ulster Rifles who were killed by Japanese aerial attacks on Shanghai in 1937.

In September 2014, Davidson married his American boyfriend Scott Chang (Chinese: 張志鵠) in a ceremony officiated by British Ambassador Sir Sebastian Wood at the Ambassador's residence in Beijing, causing a stir in China, where same-sex marriage is not permitted. Davidson, who was married under English law which has permitted same-sex marriage since March 2014, commented: "Obviously Scott and I are very happy to have this opportunity to marry under British law. We are very proud that the UK is one of the few countries in the world to make this happen."

On 7 September 2015, Davidson was appointed Her Majesty's Ambassador to Thailand, being set to take up his appointment in September 2016. However, he actually took up the post in June 2016.

He was appointed Companion of the Order of St Michael and St George (CMG) in the 2021 New Year Honours for services to British foreign policy.

Diplomatic posts
Preceded by Chris Wood	British Consul General in Guangzhou; 2006–2010	Succeeded by Alastair Morgan
Preceded by Carma Elliot	British Consul General in Shanghai; 2011–2015	Succeeded by John Edwards
Preceded by Mark Kent	British Ambassador to Thailand; 2016–2021	Succeeded by Mark Gooding
Preceded by Andrew Heyn	British Consul General in Hong Kong and Macao; 2021–date	Incumbent
