= James Hodge (diplomat) =

British diplomat (born 1943)

Sir James Hodge KCVO CMG GCE

British Consul General to Hong Kong and Macao
- In office June 2000 – November 2003
- Preceded by: Andrew Burns
- Succeeded by: Stephen Bradley

British High Commissioner to Thailand
- In office 1996–2000
- Preceded by: Christian Adams
- Succeeded by: Barney Smith

Personal details
- Born: James William Hodge; 1943 (age 82–83) England
- Education: University of Edinburgh (MA)

Sir James William Hodge KCVO CMG GCE (born 1943) is a retired British diplomat.

Hodge studied at the University of Edinburgh and entered the Commonwealth Relations Office in 1966. He was First Secretary at the British High Commission in Nigeria (1975–77) and the Foreign and Commonwealth Office, and at the British Embassy in Japan (1981), where he became a Counsellor in 1982. He was transferred to the Embassy in Denmark in 1986 and, after returning to the United Kingdom in 1990, he was posted as Minister at the British Embassy in China in 1995. He then served as Ambassador to Thailand from 1996 to 2000 and British Consul General to Hong Kong and Macao from 2000 to 2003.

Hodge was appointed a Companion of the Order of St Michael and St George in the 1996 Birthday Honours, and a Knight Commander of the Royal Victorian Order in October 1996. He holds honorary doctorates from Ulster University and the University of Liverpool, and was appointed a Knight Grand Cross of the Order of the White Elephant in 1996.
