= Francis Cornish (diplomat) =

British diplomat

Francis Cornish CMG LVO

18th British Ambassador to Israel
- In office 1998–2001
- Monarch: Elizabeth II
- Preceded by: David Manning
- Succeeded by: Sherard Cowper-Coles

1st British Consul General to Hong Kong and Macao
- In office July 1997 – November 1997
- Preceded by: Office established
- Succeeded by: Sir Andrew Burns

9th British High Commissioner to Brunei
- In office 6 November 1983 – 5 August 1986
- Preceded by: Arthur Watson
- Succeeded by: Roger Westbrook

Personal details
- Born: Robert Francis Cornish; 18 May 1942 (age 84) England, United Kingdom
- Spouse: Alison Jane Dundas (m. 1964)
- Children: 3 daughters
- Parent: C.D. Cornish (father)
- Occupation: Soldier; Diplomat

Military service
- Allegiance: United Kingdom
- Branch/service: British Army
- Years of service: 1960–1968
- Unit: 14th/20th King's Hussars

Robert Francis Cornish CMG LVO (Chinese: 鄺富劭; born 18 May 1942) is a British former diplomat who previously served as the Foreign Office spokesman for Douglas Hurd, Senior Trade Commissioner to Hong Kong (until 1997), British Consul General to Hong Kong and Macao (July to November 1997), head of the Foreign and Commonwealth Office's news department, and Ambassador to Israel (1998 to 2001).

== Early life ==
Cornish was born on 18 May 1942 in England, Britain and educated at the Charterhouse and the Royal Military Academy Sandhurst. In 1960, he began service with the British Army and was commissioned into the 14th/20th King's Hussars in 1962, and later joined the Foreign and Commonwealth Office (ECO) in 1968. From 1968 to 1969, he worked with the Foreign and Commonwealth Office (FCO).

== Diplomatic career ==
Cornish began his diplomatic career in several countries which include Malaysia in 1970 and Indonesia from 1971 to 1973. Posted to London from 1973 to 1976, then serving as the First Secretary at the British Embassy in Bonn, Germany from 1976 to 1980. Under the Prince of Wales, he would become his Assistant Deputy Secretary from 1980 to 1983. On 6 November 1983, he was appointed as the British High Commissioner to Brunei. He vacated the colonial mansion where British officials managed Brunei's affairs as a sign of independence, but a British Gurkha battalion remained in the country for a further five years to support the national defence. From 1986 to 1990, he became the Counsellor in Washington, and Head of British Information Services in New York.

Cornish became the Head of News Department from 1990 to 1993, and from 1993 to 1997, he was the Senior Trade Commissioner in Hong Kong. From July to November 1997, he held the position of Consul-General to Hong Kong and Macao. In 1998, he was appointed as the British Ambassador to Israel, serving until 2001.

Cornish had other diplomatic and royal postings:

- Spokesman to the Foreign Secretary Douglas Hurd
- Handover transition advisor to Governor Chris Patten

== Later life ==
Cornish was chairman of South West Tourism (2003–2009) before serving as chairman of the Taunton Town Centre Company and has a smallholding in the Quantocks.

== Honours ==
In 1978 during the Queen's state visit to West Germany, he was appointed as a Member of the Royal Victorian Order (MVO). In 1984 it was redesignated as Lieutenant (LVO). In the New Year Honours of 1994, he was appointed a Companion of the Order of St Michael and St George (CMG).

- Order of St Michael and St George Companion (CMG; 1994)
- Royal Victorian Order Lieutenant (LVO; 1978)

Diplomatic posts
Preceded by Arthur Watson	British High Commissioner to Brunei; 6 November 1983 – 5 August 1986	Succeeded by Roger Westbrook
Preceded by Office established	British Consul-General to Hong Kong; 1997	Succeeded by Robert Andrew Burns
Preceded by David Manning	British Ambassador to Israel; 1998–2001	Succeeded by Sherard Cowper-Coles
