= Anthony Goodenough =

British diplomat

Sir Anthony Michael Goodenough KCMG KStJ (born 1941) is a British retired diplomat, and High Commissioner to Canada from 1996 to 2000.

Goodenough is the son of Rear-Admiral Michael Grant Goodenough and Nancy Slater, daughter of Sir Ransford Slater; and the grandson of the banker Frederick Goodenough. He was educated at Wellington College and New College, Oxford.
