= List of ambassadors of the United Kingdom to Thailand =

The ambassador of the United Kingdom to Thailand is the United Kingdom's foremost diplomatic representative in Thailand, and head of the UK's diplomatic mission in Thailand. The official title is His Britannic Majesty's Ambassador to the Kingdom of Thailand. The first British consul to the Kingdom of Siam, Charles Batten Hiller, was appointed in 1856 after the signing of the Anglo-Siamese Treaty of 1855. The consulate was elevated to a legation in 1885, and to an embassy in 1947.

== Heads of mission ==
=== Ministers resident and consuls-general ===
The flag of Siam, 1855–1916

to the king of Siam

- 1885–1889: Sir Ernest Satow GCMG PC
- 1889–1894: Cpt. Henry Jones VC
- 1896–1900: Sir George Greville KCMG

=== Envoys extraordinary and ministers plenipotentiary ===
- 1901–1903: Reginald Tower
- 1904–1909: Sir Ralph Paget KCMG CVO PC
- 1909–1915: Sir Arthur Peel KCMG
- 1915–1919: Sir Herbert Dering
- 1919–1921: Richard Seymour
- 1921–1926: Sir Robert Greg KCMG
- 1926–1928: Sir Sydney Waterlow KCMG CBE
- 1928–1929: Sir Charles Wingfield KCMG
- 1929–1934: Sir Cecil Dormer KCMG MVO
- 1934–1941: Sir Josiah Crosby KCMG KBE CIE
- 1941–1945: No representation
- 1945–1947: Sir Geoffrey Thompson GBE KCMG

=== Ambassadors ===
The flag of Thailand, 1917–present

to the Kingdom of Thailand

- 1947–1950: Sir Geoffrey Thompson GBE KCMG
- 1950–1951: Sir John Magowan KBE CMG (appointed in December 1950 but died before he could present his credentials)
- 1951–1954: Sir Geoffrey Wallinger GBE KCMG
- 1954–1957: Sir Berkeley Gage KCMG
- 1957–1961: Sir Richard Whittington KCMG
- 1961–1965: Sir Dermot MacDermot KCMG CBE
- 1965–1967: Sir Anthony Rumbold Bt KCMG KCVO CB
- 1967–1970: Sir Neil Pritchard KCMG
- 1970–1973: Sir Arthur de la Mare KCMG KCVO
- 1973–1978: Sir David Cole KCMG
- 1978–1981: Peter Tripp CMG
- 1981–1986: Justin Staples CMG
- 1986–1989: Derek Tonkin CMG
- 1989–1992: Sir Ramsay Melhuish KBE CMG
- 1992–1996: Christian Adams CMG
- 1996–2000: Sir James Hodge KCVO CMG
- 2000–2003: Barney Smith CMG
- 2003–2007: David Fall CMG
- 2007–2010: Quinton Quayle
- 2010–2012: Asif Ahmad
- 2012–2016: Mark Kent
- 2016–2021: Brian Davidson
- 2021–present: Mark Gooding

== See also ==
- Thailand–United Kingdom relations
- Embassy of the United Kingdom, Bangkok
