= Thomas Drew (diplomat) =

British diplomat (born 1970)

His Excellency Sir Thomas Drew KCMG
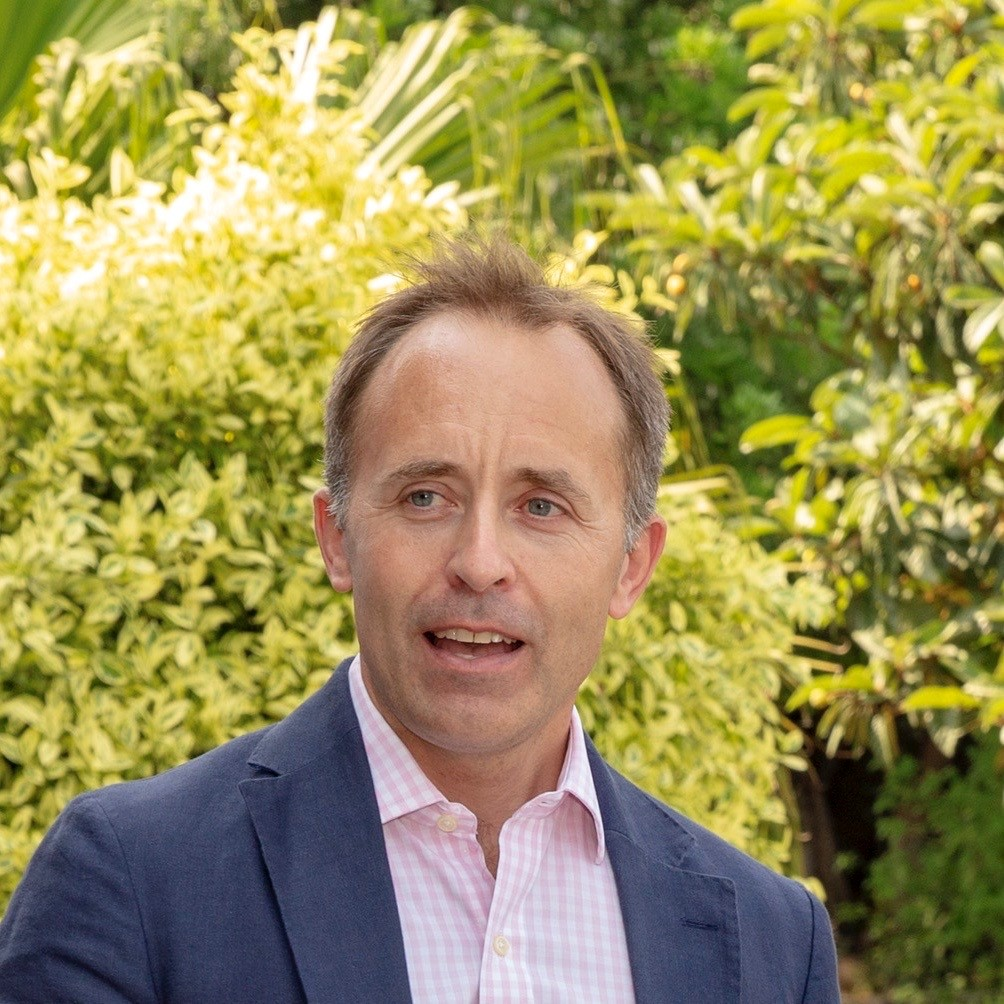
- Sir Thomas Drew

British Ambassador to France
- Incumbent
- Assumed office August 2025
- Monarch: Charles III
- Prime Minister: Keir Starmer; Andy Burnham
- Preceded by: Dame Menna Rawlings

Director-General Defence and Intelligence, FCDO
- In office February 2020 – December 2023
- Monarchs: Elizabeth II; Charles III
- Prime Minister: Boris Johnson; Liz Truss; Rishi Sunak
- Preceded by: Sir Philip Barton
- Succeeded by: Jonathan Allen

British High Commissioner to Pakistan
- In office February 2016 – November 2019
- Monarch: Elizabeth II
- Prime Minister: David Cameron; Theresa May; Boris Johnson
- Preceded by: Philip Barton
- Succeeded by: Christian Turner

Personal details
- Born: Thomas Drew; 26 September 1970 (age 55) Haslemere, Surrey, England
- Spouse(s): Joanna Roper (m. 2016) styled Lady Drew (since 2024)
- Education: Charterhouse
- Alma mater: Trinity College, Oxford
- Awards: KCMG (2024)

Sir Thomas Drew KCMG (born 26 September 1970), is a British diplomat who has been serving as the British Ambassador to France from August 2025, succeeding Dame Menna Rawlings.

Previously Director-General, Defence and Intelligence at the Foreign, Commonwealth and Development Office (2020–23), before that Drew was British High Commissioner to Pakistan (from February 2016 to November 2019).

== Education ==
Born at Haslemere in 1970 to Peter John Drew and Rosemary Jane Beverley née Sach, he was educated at Charterhouse in Surrey, before going up to read Classics at Trinity College, Oxford, where he graduated BA (with first-class honours). He was elected an honorary fellow of Trinity in 2025.

== Career ==
Drew started his career at McKinsey & Company, the management consultants, before joining Her Majesty's Diplomatic Service in 1995. After serving in London and a period of full-time Russian language training, he was posted to the British Embassy, Moscow in 1998 as Second then First Secretary heading the Embassy's economic team. In 2002, Drew returned to the FCO in London to head the EU Intergovernmental Conference Unit, the team negotiating what became the Treaty establishing a Constitution for Europe. Once the conference concluded in 2004, Drew continued in London heading the EU Enlargement and South East Europe Group until 2006, when he was posted as the Political Counsellor to the British High Commission in Islamabad.

In 2008, Drew was seconded to the Home Office as Director of the Office for Security and Counter-Terrorism. He returned to the Foreign Office in 2011 as National Security Director. He was then appointed Principal Private Secretary to the Foreign Secretary in 2012, serving both William Hague and Philip Hammond.

In 2015 Drew returned to McKinsey & Company on secondment, as Visiting Fellow at the McKinsey Global Institute. In the Queen's Birthday Honours in 2015 he was appointed Companion of the Order of St Michael and St George (CMG) "for services to British foreign policy interests".

From February 2016 to November 2019, Drew served as British High Commissioner to the Islamic Republic of Pakistan. He returned to London as Director-General, Consular and Security at the FCO, becoming Director-General, Middle East, North Africa, Afghanistan and Pakistan upon the merger of the FCO and Department for International Development in September 2020. From 2022 until 2023, he served as Director-General, Defence and Intelligence, where his responsibilities included leading the FCDO's response to Russia's invasion of Ukraine.

Drew served as a Trustee of the British Council from 2020 until 2024.

He was promoted Knight Commander of the Order of St Michael and St George (KCMG) in the 2024 New Year Honours "for services to British foreign policy and national security".

Appointed British Ambassador to the French Republic in succession to Dame Menna Rawlings, Sir Tom took up residence at the Hôtel de Charost, Paris, in August 2025.

== Personal life ==
In 2016, Drew married Joanna Roper, also a career diplomat, former British Ambassador to the Netherlands.

== See also ==
- British Embassy in Paris

Diplomatic posts
Preceded by Lindsay Croisdale-Appleby	Principal Private Secretary to the Foreign Secretary; 2012–2014	Succeeded by Martin Reynolds
Preceded by Sir Philip Barton	British High Commissioner to Pakistan; 2016–2019	Succeeded by Christian Turner
Preceded by Dame Menna Rawlings	British Ambassador to France; 2025-present	Succeeded by Incumbent
