= Menna Rawlings =

British diplomat

Her Excellency Dame Menna Rawlings DCMG CVO
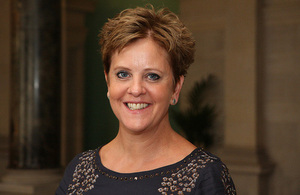

British Ambassador to France
- In office August 2021 – July 2025
- Monarchs: Elizabeth II; Charles III
- Prime Minister: Boris Johnson; Liz Truss; Rishi Sunak; Keir Starmer
- Preceded by: The Lord Llewellyn of Steep
- Succeeded by: Sir Thomas Drew

British High Commissioner to Australia
- In office 2015–2019
- Monarch: Elizabeth II
- Prime Minister: David Cameron; Theresa May
- Preceded by: Paul Madden
- Succeeded by: Victoria Treadell

Personal details
- Born: Menna Frances Hornung; 16 September 1967 (age 59) Hillingdon, Middlesex, England
- Spouse: Mark John Rawlings
- Children: 3
- Education: London School of Economics (BSc)

Dame Menna Frances Rawlings DCMG CVO (née Hornung; born 16 September 1967) is a British diplomat who served as British Ambassador to France between August 2021 and July 2025. Previously British High Commissioner to Australia from 2015 to 2019, she then served as Director General of Economic and Global Issues at the Foreign and Commonwealth Office from 2019 to 2020. She is currently the President of Queens' College, Cambridge.

== Career ==
Menna Hornung studied International Relations at the London School of Economics, earning a Bachelor of Science degree before joining the Foreign and Commonwealth Office in 1989. Early in her career, she held posts in London, Brussels, Nairobi and Tel Aviv.

From 2002 to 2004, she served as private secretary to the Permanent Under-Secretary of State for Foreign Affairs. She was then deputy high commissioner to Ghana at Accra until 2008. Following three years as HM Consul General in Washington, D.C., she returned to London in 2011 as director for human resources at the FCO, a role she held until 2014. From 2015 to 2018, she was British High Commissioner to Australia, before becoming Director General of Economic and Global Issues at the FCO in 2019, serving until 2020.

In April 2021, the Government nominated her as British Ambassador to France, and she assumed the role on 23 August 2021. Her appointment marked the first time all British ambassadors or high commissioners to G7 countries were women. During her tenure in Paris, King Charles III and Queen Camilla made a state visit to France in September 2023.

Already a Companion of the Order of St Michael and St George (CMG), she was made a Dame Commander of the Order of St Michael and St George (DCMG) in the 2022 New Year Honours for services to British foreign policy. She was also appointed a Commander of the Royal Victorian Order (CVO) in September 2023 in connection with His Majesty’s State Visit to France. In July 2025, Rawlings was awarded an Honorary Doctor of Literature by the University of London.

On 3 June 2025, she was announced as the next President of Queens' College, Cambridge, taking over from Dr. Mohamed El-Erian on 1 October 2025. She is the first female President in the history of the college, which was founded in 1448.

== See also ==
- British Embassy in Paris

Diplomatic posts
Preceded by Paul Madden	British High Commissioner to Australia; 2015–2019	Succeeded by Victoria Treadell
Preceded by The Lord Llewellyn of Steep	British Ambassador to France; 2021–2025	Succeeded by Sir Thomas Drew
Academic offices
Preceded by Mohamed El-Erian	President of Queens' College, Cambridge; 2025–	Incumbent
