= Portrait of the Duke of Wellington (Gérard) =

Painting by François Gérard

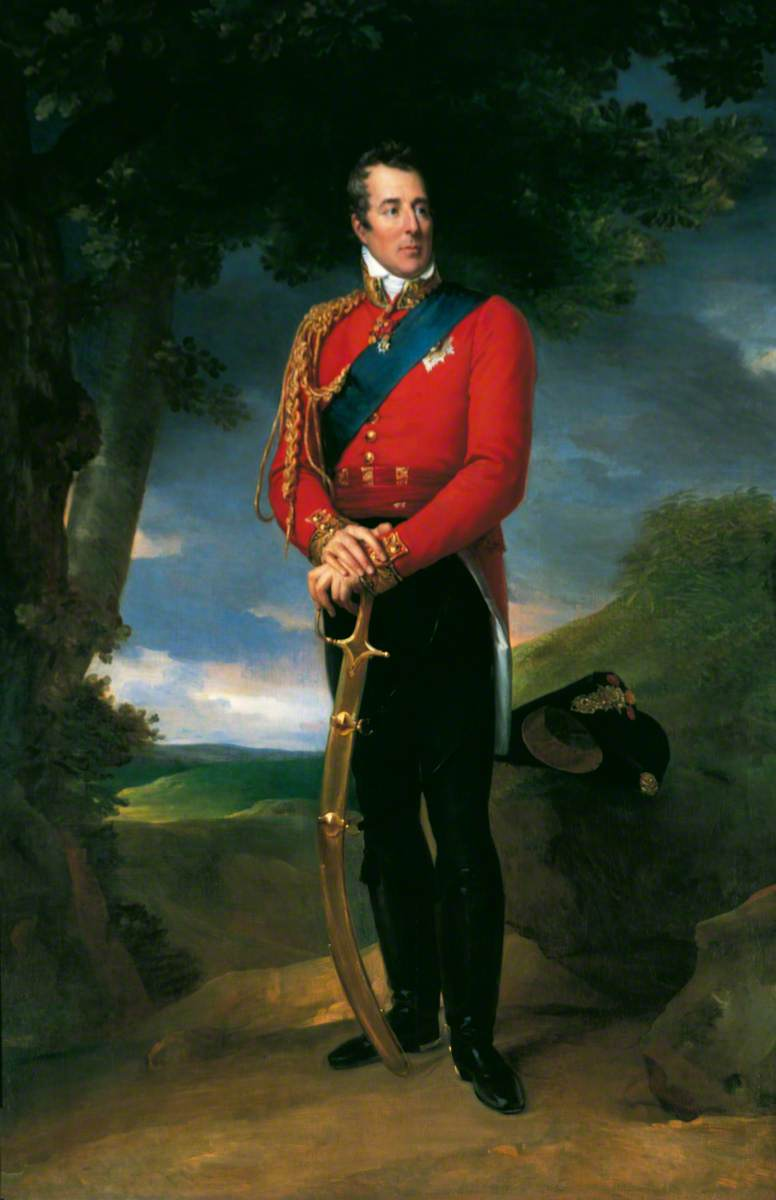
- Artist: François Gérard
- Year: 1814
- Type: Oil on canvas, portrait painting
- Dimensions: 245 cm × 160 cm (96 in × 63 in)
- Location: British Embassy, Paris

Portrait of the Duke of Wellington is an 1814 portrait painting by the French artist François Gérard. It depicts the Anglo-Irish soldier Arthur Wellesley, 1st Duke of Wellington. The painting was produced in Paris where the Wellington was serving as British Ambassador to France, having led an Allied Army to victory during the Peninsular War. The following year he would defeat Napoleon at the Battle of Waterloo, the climax of the Napoleonic Wars. The Duke is shown at full-length wearing the uniform of a Field Marshal of the British Army and the decorations of the Order of the Garter, Order of the Golden Fleece and the Order of the Bath.

Gérard, a pupil of Jacques-Louis David, was one of the leading French portraitists of the era. The work was commissioned from him by Wellington for 12,000 Francs. An engraving was produced by François Forster in 1818. Visiting Paris in 1815, Wellington's friend Lady Shelley noted that it remained uncompleted in the artist's studio, delayed by Napoleon's escape and the Hundred Days Campaign. She compared it negatively to similar works by the English artist Thomas Lawrence. The painting is now part of the Government Art Collection, having been purchased in 1953.

A second, smaller version of the painting was acquired from the artist's widow for the Musée de l'Histoire de France at the Palace of Versailles in 1837. Another replica produced in 1817 for Alexander I of Russia, with the addition of the Russian Order of Saint Andrew, is now in the Hermitage Museum in Saint Petersburg.

== Bibliography ==
- Muir, Rory. Wellington: Waterloo and the Fortunes of Peace 1814–1852. Yale University Press, 2020.
- Wellesley, Charles. Wellington Portrayed. Unicorn Press, 2014.
