= Philip Barton =

British diplomat (born 1963)

Sir Philip Barton GCMG OBE
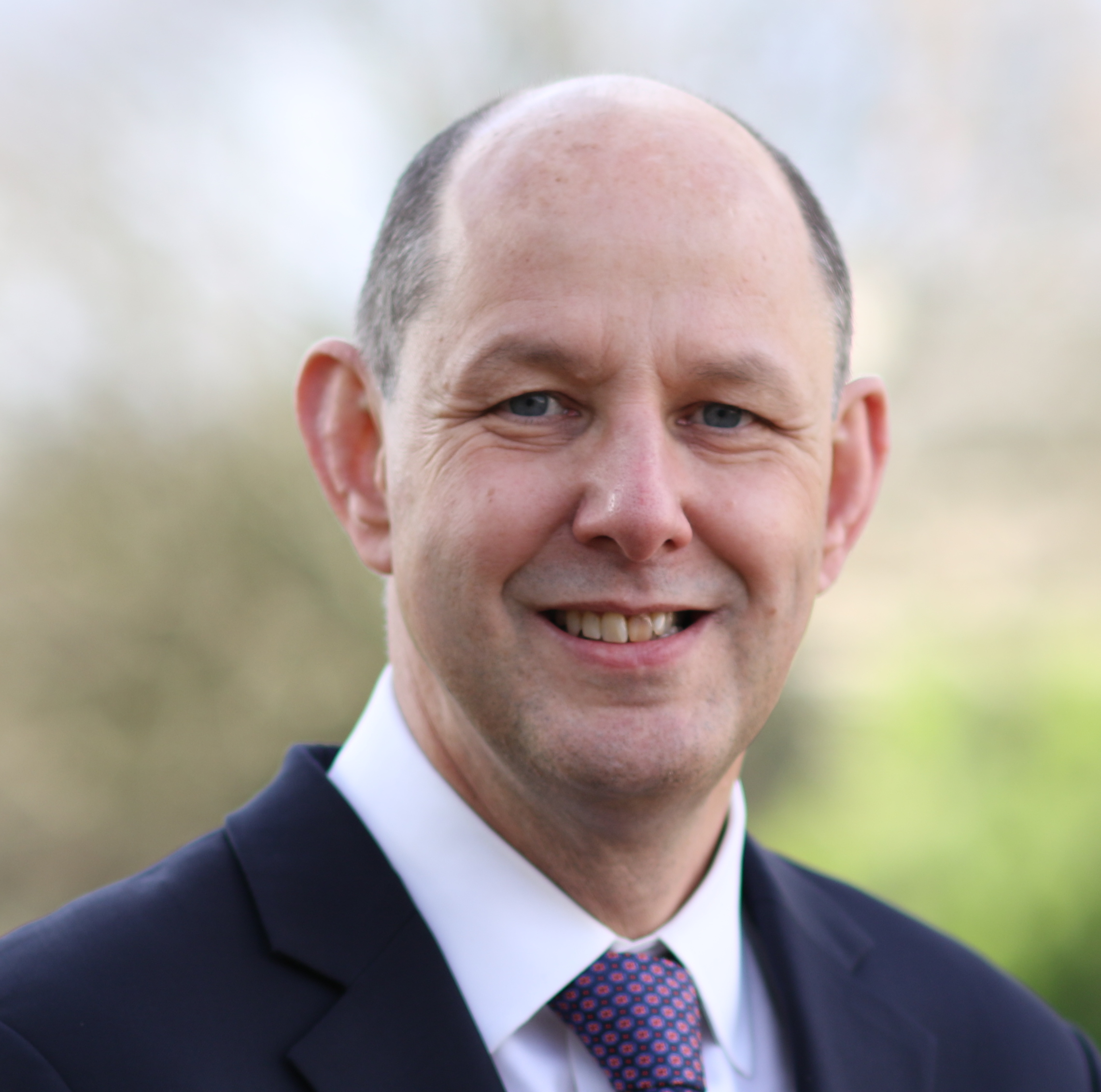

Permanent Under-Secretary for Foreign, Commonwealth & Development Affairs Head of HM Diplomatic Service
- In office 2 September 2020 – 8 January 2025
- Prime Minister: Boris Johnson; Liz Truss; Rishi Sunak; Keir Starmer
- Foreign Secretary: Dominic Raab; Liz Truss; James Cleverly; David Cameron; David Lammy
- Preceded by: Simon McDonald (Note: as Permanent Under-Secretary to the Foreign & Commonwealth Office)
- Succeeded by: Sir Oliver Robbins

British High Commissioner to India
- In office June 2020 – August 2020
- Monarch: Elizabeth II
- Prime Minister: Boris Johnson
- Preceded by: Dominic Asquith
- Succeeded by: Alex Ellis

British High Commissioner to Pakistan
- In office January 2014 – 11 February 2016
- Monarch: Elizabeth II
- Prime Minister: David Cameron
- Preceded by: Adam Thomson
- Succeeded by: Thomas Drew

Deputy British Ambassador to the United States
- In office 2011–2013
- Monarch: Elizabeth II
- President: Barack Obama
- Prime Minister: David Cameron
- Preceded by: Sir Dominick Chilcott
- Succeeded by: Patrick Davies

British Chargé d'Affaires ad interim to the United States
- In office January 2012
- Monarch: Elizabeth II
- President: Barack Obama
- Prime Minister: David Cameron
- Preceded by: Sir Nigel Sheinwald
- Succeeded by: Sir Peter Westmacott

Personal details
- Born: 18 August 1963 (age 63)
- Spouse: Amanda Barton
- Children: 2
- Education: University of Warwick; London School of Economics
- Occupation: Diplomat

Sir Philip Robert Barton GCMG OBE (born 18 August 1963) is a British diplomat, formerly the Permanent Under-Secretary of the Foreign, Commonwealth and Development Office. He was previously British High Commissioner to India; he was High Commissioner to Pakistan from 2014 to 2016.

== Early life and education ==
Barton was born on 18 August 1963. He studied economics and politics at the University of Warwick, graduating with a Bachelor of Arts (BA) degree, and economics at the London School of Economics, graduating with a Master of Science (MSc) degree.

== Career ==
Barton joined the Foreign and Commonwealth Office (FCO) in 1986 and served at Caracas, New Delhi, at the FCO, and on secondment to the Cabinet Office and as a private secretary to the Prime Minister. He was deputy High Commissioner to Cyprus 2000–04; deputy Governor of Gibraltar 2005–08 (with a spell as acting Governor in 2006); Director, South Asia, at the FCO 2008–09; Director, Foreign Policy and Afghanistan, and Pakistan Co-ordinator at the Cabinet Office 2009–11; deputy head of mission at Washington, D.C. 2011–14; and was appointed High Commissioner to Pakistan from January 2014. Anti-tobacco movements in Pakistan and in the UK blamed Barton for his participation in a delegation led by British American Tobacco in 2015 to complain about the Pakistani government's decision to increase the size of health warnings on cigarette packs. "Inside sources at the Health Ministry confirmed the participation of the British High Commissioner in the meeting as a member of the delegation." He left Islamabad at the end of his assignment on 11 February 2016 and took up a post as Director General Consular & Security at the Foreign & Commonwealth Office in London, which he left in January 2020 to assume the role of High Commissioner to India, with the presentation of his credentials to the President of India on 8 July 2020. He was the shortest-serving High Commissioner to India on record. He departed this role and became the first Permanent Under-Secretary of State for the newly combined Foreign, Commonwealth & Development Affairs Office and thus Head of HM Diplomatic Service on 2 September 2020. He succeeded Sir Simon McDonald who had served since 2015.

In 2021, Sir Philip apologised for the treatment of gay staff: “The ban was in place because there was a perception that LGBT people were more susceptible than their straight counterparts to blackmail and, therefore, that they posed a security risk. Because of this misguided view, people’s careers were ended, cut short, or stopped before they could even begin. And the diplomatic service undoubtedly deprived itself of some of the UK’s brightest and best talent. I want to apologise publicly for the ban and the impact it had on our LGBT staff and their loved ones, both here in the UK and abroad.”

In December 2021, he admitted failing to show leadership after he began a three-week holiday two days before the Foreign Office internally accepted Kabul was about to fall to the Taliban. Sir Philip remained on holiday until 28 August. During questioning by the Foreign Affairs Select Committee, he admitted this was a mistake.

In January 2024, he was criticised by the Chair of the Foreign Affairs Select Committee, Alicia Kearns, for being reticent to agree that Israel has a duty under international law to not block water access to Gaza.

In November 2024 Barton stated he would resign in January 2025. Sir Philip became permanent secretary in 2020 but left eight months before the full five-year terms achieved by his two predecessors. When asked to explain his reasons for leaving early, during evidence to the Foreign Affairs Select Committee’s session on the appointment of Lord Mandelson as UK ambassador to the US, he said:

I will be honest and open with you, and I am no longer a civil servant: it was not my choice to leave at that point, Chair, and I would have preferred to see out my tenure. But after what I think was a very successful transition to the Labour team in the FCDO, David Lammy wanted to make a change, and told me that and that he wanted somebody who would lead the Department over the years ahead and carry out a major transformation programme, so I agreed to leave.

He was replaced by Sir Oliver Robbins. Prior to leaving, Barton had objected to the appointment of Peter Mandelson to be UK ambassador to the USA, the issue which also led to the dismissal of Robbins in April 2026.

== Honours ==
Barton was appointed Officer of the Order of the British Empire (OBE) in the 1997 Birthday Honours, Companion of the Order of St Michael and St George (CMG) in the 2007 Birthday Honours, Knight Commander of the Order of St Michael and St George (KCMG) in the 2020 New Year Honours for services to British foreign policy, and Knight Grand Cross of the Order of St Michael and St George (GCMG) in the 2025 Birthday Honours.

== Notes ==
Diplomatic posts
| Preceded by Sir Adam Thomson | British High Commissioner to Pakistan; 2014–2016 | Succeeded by Thomas Drew |
| Preceded by Sir Dominic Asquith | British High Commissioner to India; 2020 | Succeeded by Alexander Ellis |
Government offices
| Preceded by Sir Simon McDonald | Permanent Under-Secretary at the Foreign, Commonwealth and Development Office; 2020–2025 | Succeeded by Sir Oliver Robbins |
