= Christian Turner =

British diplomat (born 1972)

His Excellency Sir Christian Turner KCMG CVO
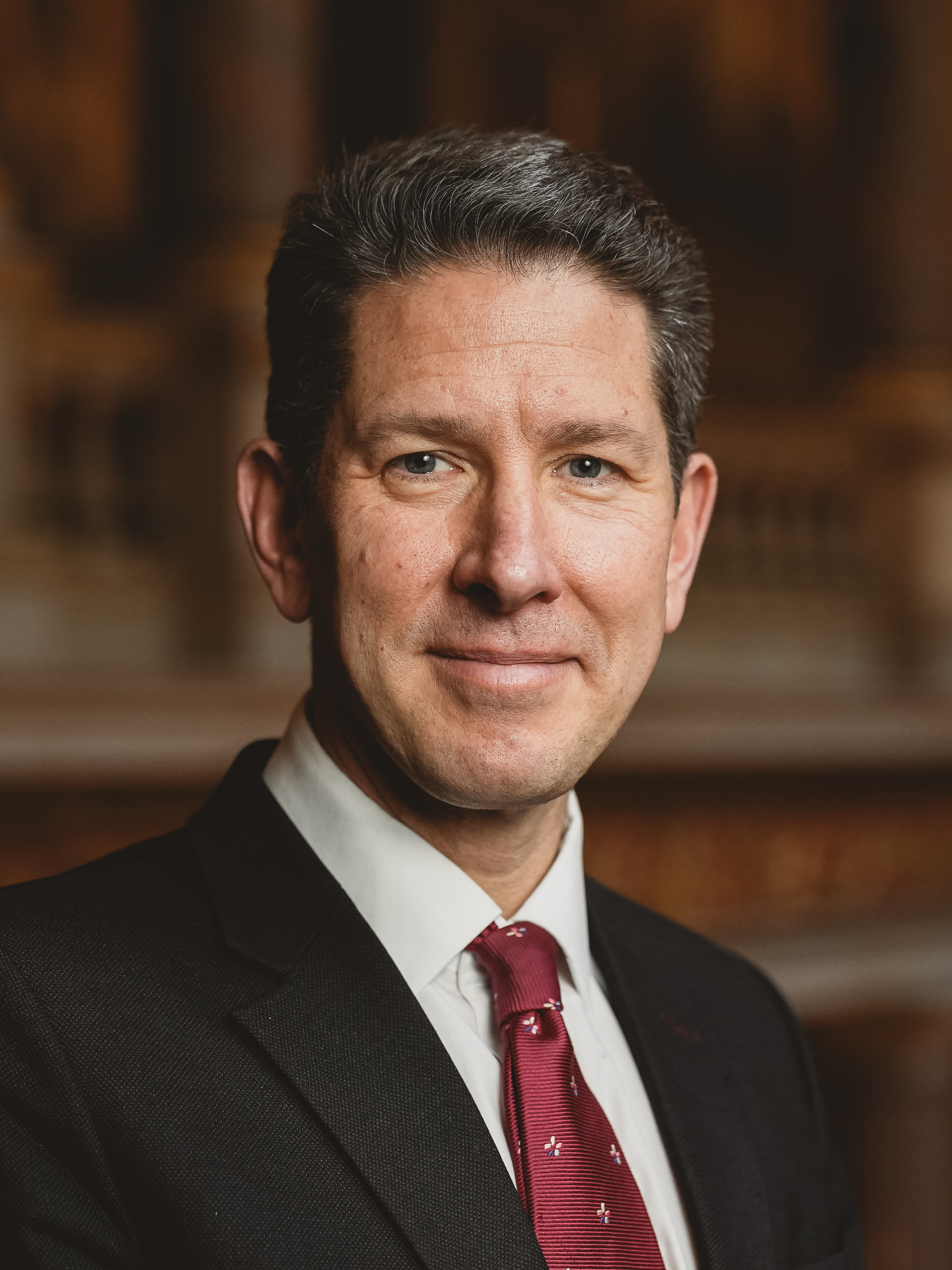
- Official portrait, 2026

British Ambassador to the United States
- Incumbent
- Assumed office 2 February 2026
- Monarch: Charles III
- Prime Minister: Keir Starmer; Andy Burnham
- Preceded by: Peter Mandelson

Political Director of the Foreign, Commonwealth and Development Office
- In office January 2023 – September 2025
- Prime Minister: Rishi Sunak; Keir Starmer
- Preceded by: Tim Barrow
- Succeeded by: Edward Llewellyn, Baron Llewellyn of Steep

British High Commissioner to Pakistan
- In office 1 December 2019 – January 2023
- Monarchs: Elizabeth II; Charles III
- Prime Minister: Boris Johnson; Liz Truss; Rishi Sunak
- Preceded by: Thomas Drew

Deputy National Security Adviser and Prime Minister's Adviser on International Affairs
- In office April 2017 – July 2019
- Prime Minister: Theresa May
- Preceded by: General Sir Gwyn Jenkins (Deputy National Security Adviser for Conflict, Stability and Defence)
- Succeeded by: Sir David Quarrey

British High Commissioner to Kenya
- In office 2012–2015
- Monarch: Elizabeth II
- Prime Minister: David Cameron
- Preceded by: Robert Macaire
- Succeeded by: Nic Hailey

Personal details
- Born: Christian Philip Hollier Turner; 19 August 1972 (age 54) Crawley, West Sussex, England
- Spouse: Claire Turner (m. 2003)
- Children: 2
- Education: University of Manchester (BA); University of York (PhD)

Sir Christian Philip Hollier Turner, KCMG CVO (born 19 August 1972) is a British diplomat who has served as the British ambassador to the United States since February 2026, following the dismissal of Peter Mandelson.

He previously served as Political Director of the Foreign, Commonwealth and Development Office from January 2023 to September 2025 and is a Visiting Fellow at the Blavatnik School of Government at the University of Oxford. He was the British High Commissioner to Pakistan from 2019 to 2023, and had been expected to take up the role of British ambassador to the United Nations in 2026, before his appointment to Washington was announced.

== Early life ==
Turner was educated at Marlborough College and graduated with a BA degree in English language and literature from the University of Manchester. He was a Career Tutor at the University of York from 1996 to 1998, when he graduated as a Doctor of Philosophy in medieval English and related literature.

== Career ==
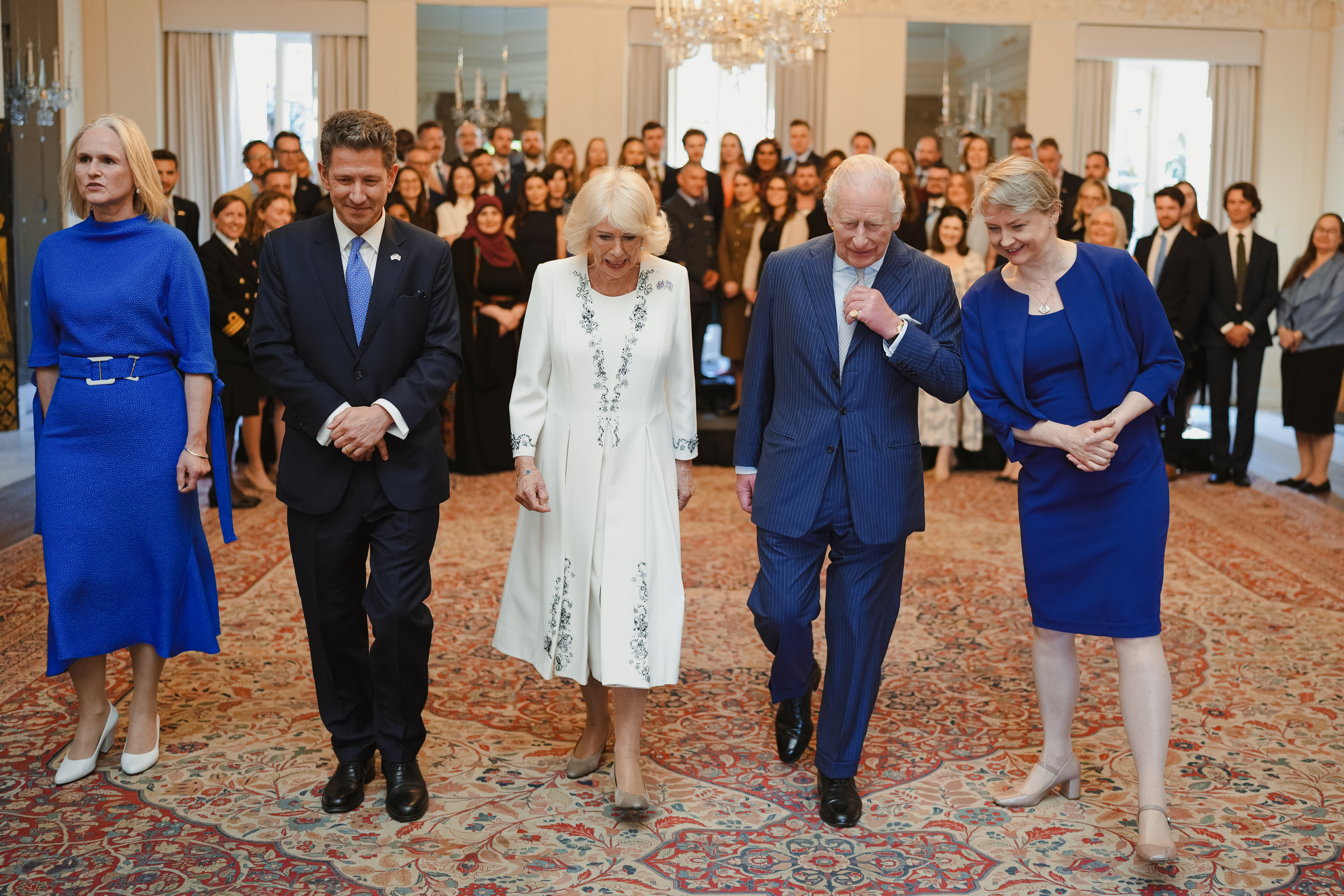
Turner with King Charles III, Queen Camilla, and Foreign Secretary Yvette Cooper at the 2026 United States state visit.

After working as a researcher for Videotext Communications in 1998, Turner joined the Cabinet Office that year and was Secretary to the Better Regulation Taskforce, 1998–1999, then Secretary to the Economic and Domestic Committees of the Cabinet, 1999–2000. After serving as Private Secretary to a Minister of State, 2001–2002, Turner was Deputy Team Leader in the Prime Minister's Strategy Unit, 2002–2003, and First Secretary at the British Embassy in Washington, DC, 2003–2006, joining the Foreign, Commonwealth and Development Office in 2005. On his return to Whitehall, he served as Private Secretary to Prime Minister Gordon Brown in 2007; and as Director Middle East and North Africa, 2009–2012 during the Arab Spring.

Turner served as High Commissioner to Kenya from 2012 to 2015. During his time in Kenya he led the UK response to the Westgate Mall terrorist attack and the UK's reconciliation with the Mau Mau.

On his return to the UK in 2016, Turner led the London Syria Conference for No 10, raising $12 billion for Syrian refugees. In 2016 he became Director General for the Middle East and Africa and then acting Political Director General. From 2017 to 2019 he served as Prime Minister Theresa May's international affairs advisor and Deputy National Security Advisor. In this role he was also senior responsible owner for the £1.25 billion Conflict, Stability and Security Fund.

Turner served as High Commissioner to Pakistan from 2019 to 2023 before becoming Political Director of the Foreign, Commonwealth and Development Office. In May 2025 it was announced that he would succeed Dame Barbara Woodward as British ambassador to the United Nations. Subsequently it was revealed that he was also under consideration for nomination as Britain's ambassador to the United States following the dismissal of Peter Mandelson amid the scandal surrounding his ties to Jeffrey Epstein, alongside a number of other candidates including Mark Sedwill, Richard Moore and Lindsay Croisdale-Appleby. In December 2025 Turner was appointed as Ambassador by Prime Minister Keir Starmer. He took up the post on 2 February 2026 after presenting his credentials to the Department of State.

In April 2026, remarks made by Turner in February 2026 during an event in Washington, D.C. addressed to British students were made public; these included comments on Starmer being "on the ropes" over the Mandelson scandal, criticising the lack of response to the Epstein files in the US (as compared to the UK), and criticising the "special relationship" as a "nostalgic" and "backwards-looking" term when applied to US-UK relations, saying that the one country with a real "special relationship" with the US was Israel (this was said shortly before the US-Israeli strikes on Iran that led to the 2026 Iran war). The Foreign Office clarified that these were private, informal comments and not the UK government's official position.

== Honours ==
Turner was appointed a Companion of the Order of St Michael and St George (CMG) in the 2012 New Year Honours, and promoted to Knight Commander of the same Order (KCMG) in the 2026 New Year Honours. He was appointed Commander of the Royal Victorian Order (CVO) on 30 April 2026 following the King's state visit to the United States that month.

== Personal life ==
In October 2002, Turner and Claire J. Barber announced their engagement. They were married in 2003 and have two children, both of whom were born in Washington DC while their parents were working at the British embassy there early in the 21st century.

Diplomatic posts
Preceded by Robert Macaire	British High Commissioner to Kenya; 2012–2015	Succeeded by Nic Hailey
Preceded by Thomas Drew	British High Commissioner to Pakistan; 2019–2023	Succeeded by Andrew Dalgleish
Preceded by The Lord Mandelson	British Ambassador to the United States; 2026–present	Succeeded by Incumbent
