= List of ambassadors of the United Kingdom to France =

British Ambassador to France L'Ambassadeur britannique en France
- Royal arms of His Majesty's Government

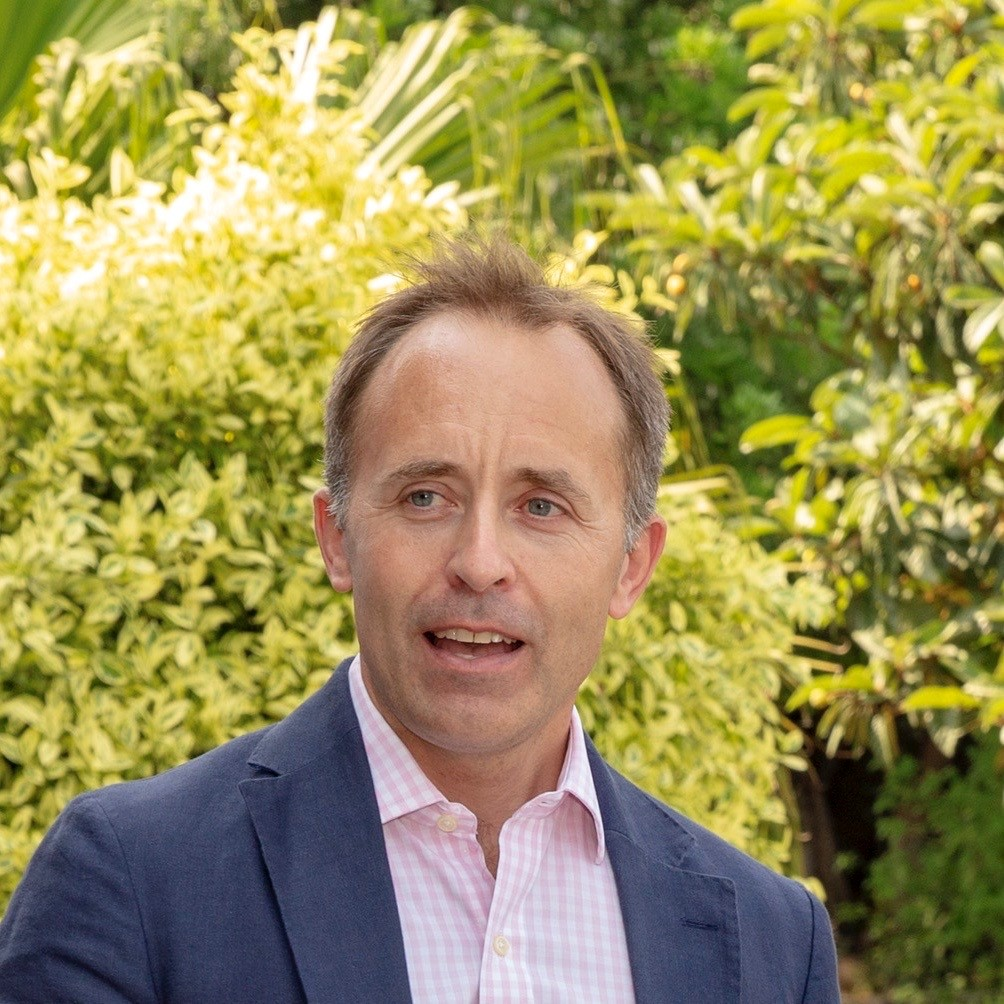
- Incumbent; Sir Thomas Drew since August 2025
- Foreign and Commonwealth Office; British Embassy, Paris
- Style: His Excellency
- Reports to: Secretary of State for Foreign and Commonwealth Affairs
- Residence: Hôtel de Charost
- Seat: Paris, France
- Appointer: The Crown on advice of the prime minister
- Term length: At His Majesty's pleasure
- Inaugural holder: The Marquess Cornwallis (first ambassador of the United Kingdom to France, 1801)
- Website: British Embassy - Paris

The British ambassador to France is the United Kingdom's foremost diplomatic representative in France, and is the head of Britain's diplomatic mission in Paris. The official title is His Britannic Majesty's Ambassador to the Republic of France.

Traditionally, the Embassy to France has been the most prestigious posting in the British foreign service, although in past centuries, diplomatic representation was lacking due to wars between the two countries and the Nazi occupation.

For the period before the creation of the United Kingdom of Great Britain and Ireland in 1801, see List of ambassadors of the Kingdom of England to France (up to 1707) and List of ambassadors of Great Britain to France (from 1707 to 1800).

The Paris embassy also covers remotely the French overseas territories (including French Guiana, Guadeloupe, Martinique, Saint Pierre and Miquelon, Réunion, French Polynesia, Mayotte, Wallis and Futuna, New Caledonia, Saint-Barthélemy) and Monaco.

Besides the embassy, the Foreign & Commonwealth Office maintains consulates in Bordeaux and Marseille in southern France.

== British ambassadors and ministers to France ==
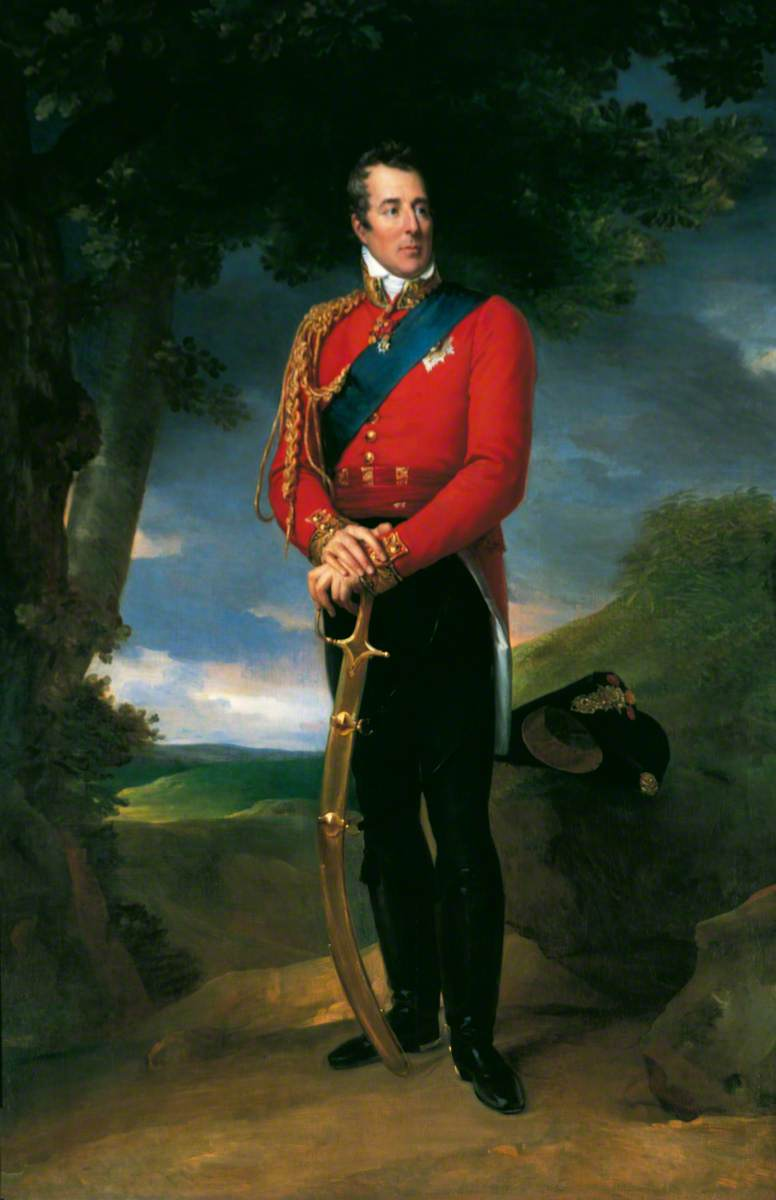
Portrait of the Duke of Wellington by François Gérard, 1814. Painted while Wellington was serving as ambassador.

There was no representation of Great Britain or the United Kingdom in France from 1792 to 1801, due to the French Revolutionary Wars

- 1801–1802: The Marquess Cornwallis, Plenipotentiary
- 1802–1803: The Lord Whitworth

No representation from 1803 to 1814, due to the Napoleonic Wars
- 1806: Francis Seymour-Conway, Earl of Yarmouth and James Maitland, 8th Earl of Lauderdale, Plenipotentiaries

- 1814–1815: The Duke of Wellington
- 1815–1824: Sir Charles Stuart
- 1824–1828: The Viscount Granville
- 1828–1830: The Lord Stuart de Rothesay
- 1830–1835: The Viscount Granville
- 1835: The Lord Cowley
- 1835–1841: The Earl Granville
- 1841–1846: The Lord Cowley
- 1846–1852: The Marquess of Normanby
- 1852–1867: The Earl Cowley
- 1867–1887: The Viscount Lyons
- 1887–1891: The Earl of Lytton
- 1891–1896: The Marquess of Dufferin and Ava
- 1896–1905: Sir Edmund Monson
- 1905–1918: Sir Francis Bertie
- 1918–1920: The Earl of Derby
- 1920–1922: The Lord Hardinge of Penshurst
- 1922–1928: The Marquess of Crewe
- 1928–1934: Sir William Tyrrell
- 1934–1937: Sir George Clerk
- 1937–1939: Sir Eric Phipps
- 1939–1940: Sir Ronald Hugh Campbell

No representation from 1940 to 1944, due to the German occupation of France during the Second World War

- 1944–1948: Sir Alfred Duff Cooper, (previously Representative to the Free French in Algiers from 1943)
- 1948–1954: Sir Oliver Harvey
- 1954–1960: Sir Gladwyn Jebb
- 1960–1965: Sir Pierson Dixon
- 1965–1968: Sir Patrick Reilly
- 1968–1972: Sir Christopher Soames
- 1972–1975: Sir Edward Tomkins
- 1975–1979: Sir Nicholas Henderson
- 1979–1982: Sir Reginald Hibbert
- 1982–1987: Sir John Fretwell
- 1987–1993: Sir Ewen Fergusson
- 1993–1996: Sir Christopher Mallaby
- 1996–2001: Sir Michael Jay
- 2001–2007: Sir John Holmes
- 2007–2012: Sir Peter Westmacott
- 2012–2015: Sir Peter Ricketts
- 2016–2016: Sir Julian King
- 2016–2021: Edward Llewellyn, Baron Llewellyn of Steep OBE
- 2021–2025: Dame Menna Rawlings
- 2025–present: Sir Thomas Drew

== See also ==
- France–United Kingdom relations
- List of ambassadors of France to the United Kingdom since 1803
- Timeline of British diplomatic history
