= Kim Darroch =

British diplomat (born 1954)

The Right Honourable The Lord Darroch of Kew KCMG
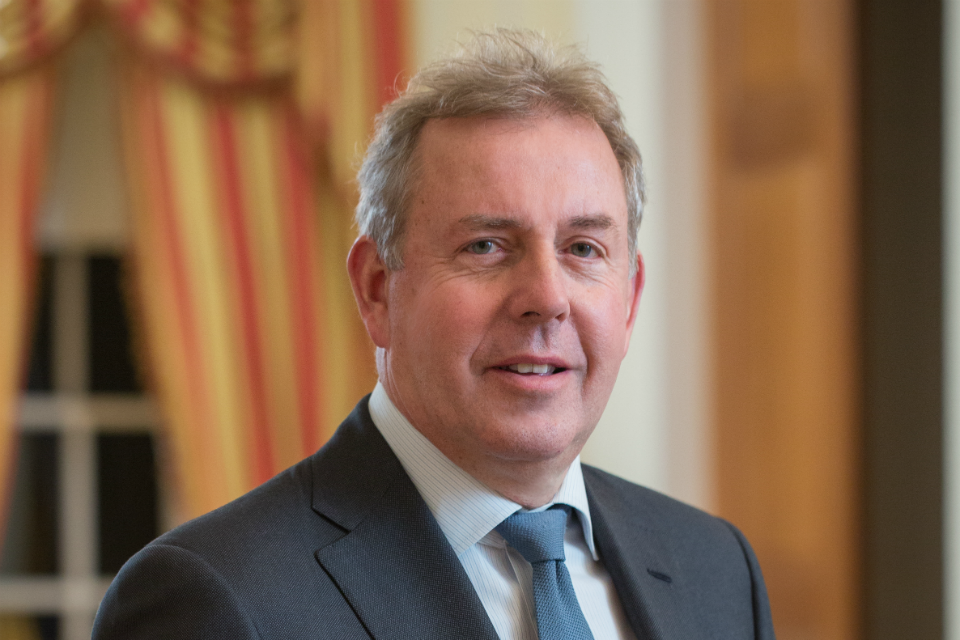
- Darroch in 2016

British Ambassador to the United States
- In office 28 January 2016 – 31 December 2019
- Monarch: Elizabeth II
- President: Barack Obama; Donald Trump
- Prime Minister: David Cameron; Theresa May; Boris Johnson
- Preceded by: Peter Westmacott
- Succeeded by: Dame Karen Pierce

United Kingdom National Security Advisor
- In office 23 January 2012 – 7 September 2015
- Prime Minister: David Cameron
- Preceded by: Peter Ricketts
- Succeeded by: Mark Lyall Grant

United Kingdom Permanent Representative to the European Union
- In office July 2007 – 23 January 2012
- Monarch: Elizabeth II
- Prime Minister: Gordon Brown; David Cameron
- Preceded by: John Grant
- Succeeded by: Jon Cunliffe

Member of the House of Lords
- Lord Temporal
- Life peerage 11 November 2019

Personal details
- Born: Nigel Kim Darroch; 30 April 1954 (age 72) South Stanley, County Durham, England
- Spouse(s): Vanessa, Lady Darroch (m. 1978)
- Children: 2
- Education: Abingdon School
- Alma mater: Hatfield College, Durham (BSc)

Nigel Kim Darroch, Baron Darroch of Kew, KCMG ( /ˈdærək/; born 30 April 1954) is a former British diplomat. He served as the British Ambassador to the United States between January 2016 and December 2019, and previously as National Security Adviser and UK Permanent Representative to the European Union.

On 10 July 2019, following the leak of diplomatic cables in which he had been critical of the Trump presidential administration, he resigned from his position as ambassador in Washington. Darroch concluded his post in December 2019 upon retirement from HM Diplomatic Service after a career spanning 40 years of public service.

== Early life ==
Nigel Kim Darroch was born in the village of South Stanley in County Durham, England, on 30 April 1954, to Alastair Macphee Darroch and Enid Darroch. He was educated at Abingdon School in Oxfordshire and at Durham University (Hatfield College), from where he graduated with a bachelor's degree in Zoology in 1975. Darroch was an avid fives player in his youth, representing his school and later Durham University.

== Career ==
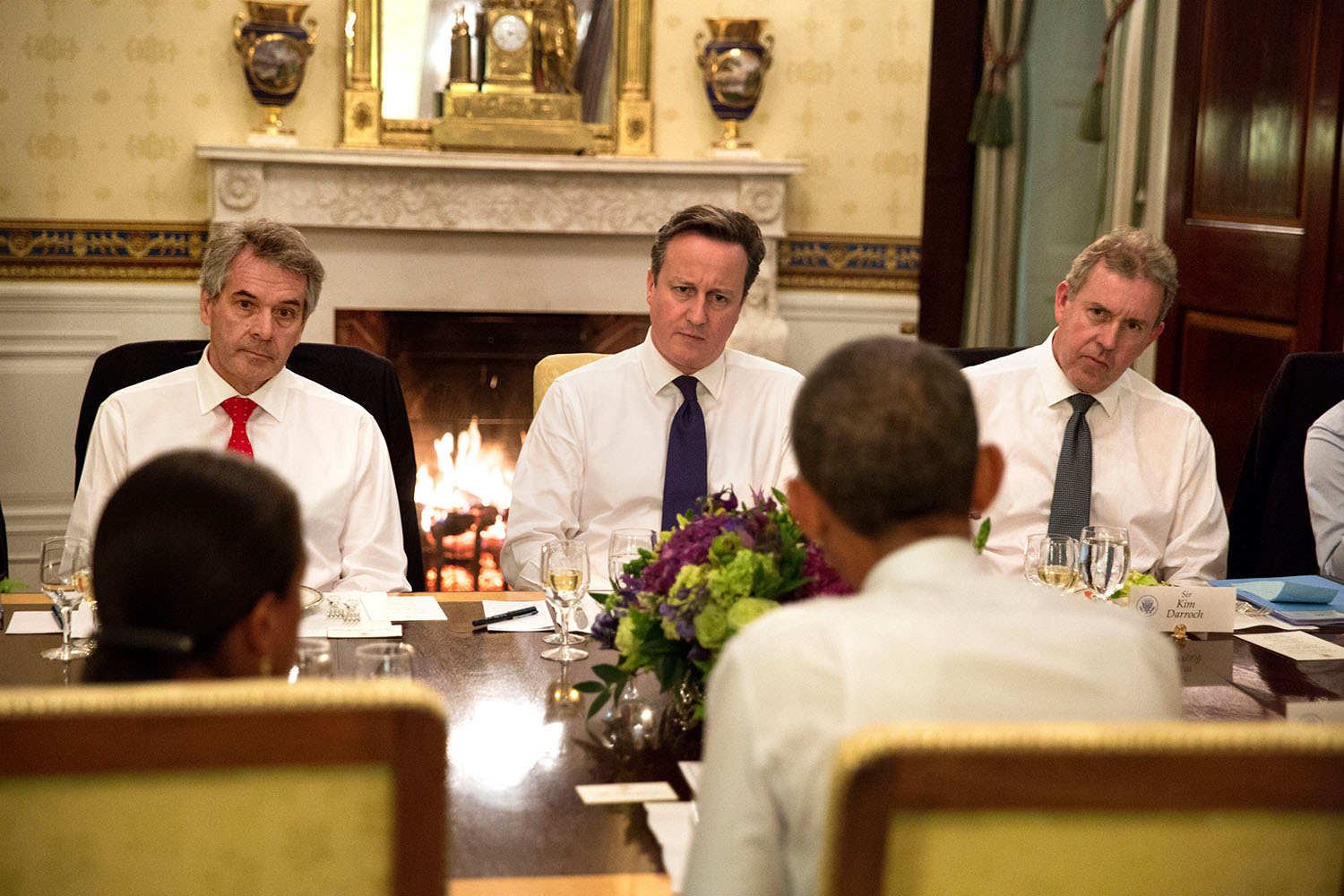
Ambassador Peter Westmacott, Prime Minister David Cameron and National Security Advisor Darroch meet with President Barack Obama at the White House in January 2015.

Darroch joined the Foreign and Commonwealth Office (FCO) in 1976. He was appointed to the Diplomatic Service in 1980 to serve as a First Secretary in Tokyo from 1980 to 1984. He served in a number of posts, including as desk officer for the Channel Tunnel project and co-secretary of the UK-French Channel Tunnel Treaty Group, as private secretary to David Mellor and then The Lord Glenarthur as the FCO's Minister of State from 1987 to 1989, and as Counsellor for External Affairs at the British Permanent Representative to the European Union for a year before being promoted to Director as head of the FCO's press office in 1998.

In 2000, Darroch moved back to policy work as Director of EU Comd, and in 2003 promoted further to be Director-General, Europe. In 2004, he transferred to 10 Downing Street, as Head of the Cabinet Office European Secretariat, where he served as the Prime Minister's principal advisor on European affairs. After three years, Darroch was appointed to replace John Grant in Brussels, as British Permanent Representative to the European Union in 2007 for a four-year term.

On 24 June 2011, it was announced that Darroch would replace Peter Ricketts as National Security Advisor in January 2012, with Jon Cunliffe selected as Darroch's replacement as Permanent Representative to the European Union.

=== Ambassador to the United States ===
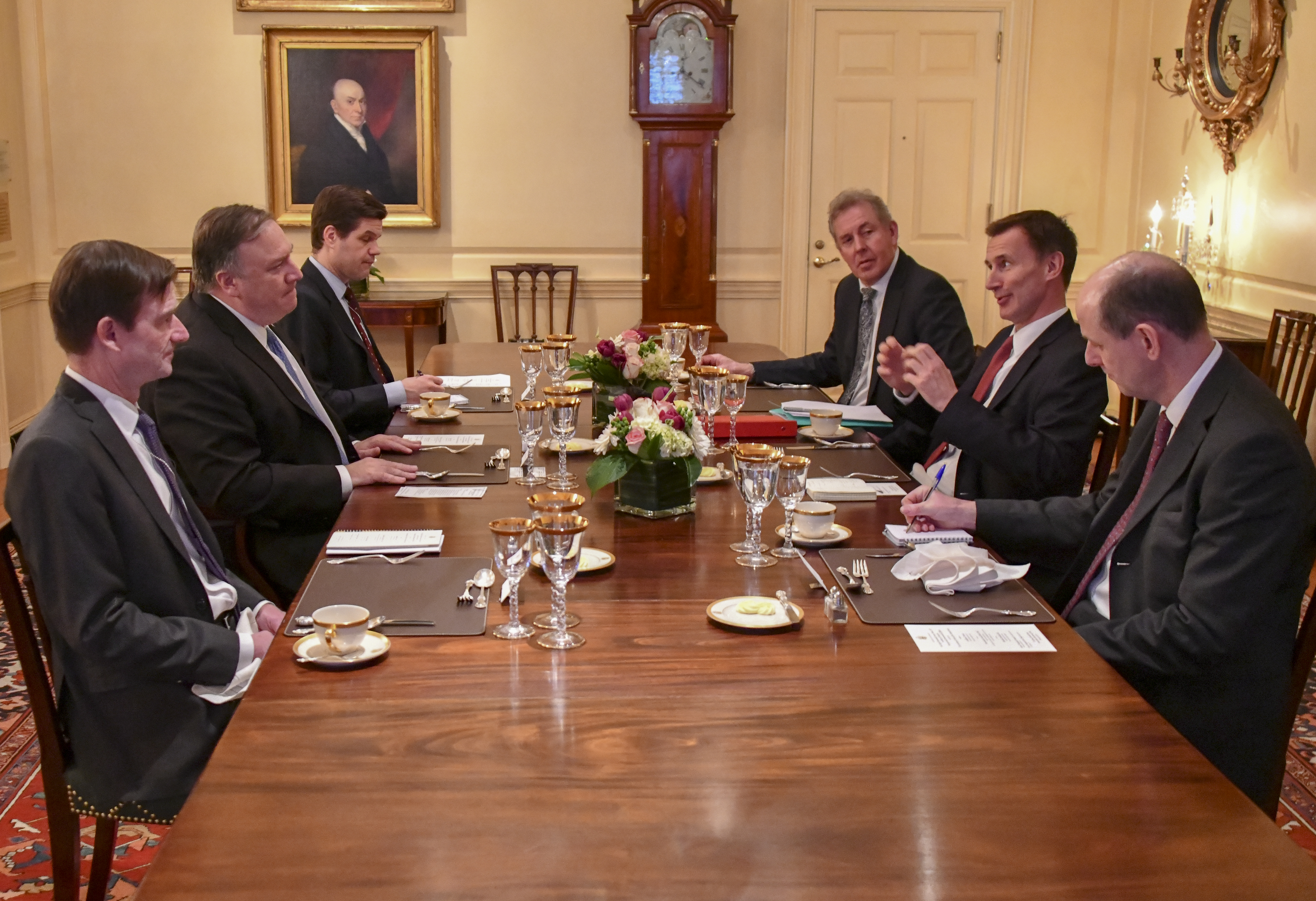
Ambassador Darroch and Foreign Secretary Jeremy Hunt (right) meet Secretary of State Mike Pompeo in January 2019.

On 7 July 2015, the Foreign Office announced that Darroch would be replaced by Mark Lyall Grant in September 2015. On 20 August 2015, the Foreign Office announced that Darroch's new role would be as the Ambassador to the United States, replacing Peter Westmacott on 28 January 2016.

In November 2016, following the US election, a memo by Darroch to Prime Minister Theresa May was leaked in which he said the President-elect of the United States, Donald Trump, could be influenced by the British government. The following week, Trump tweeted that Nigel Farage should serve as British ambassador to the United States. Downing Street said that there was no vacancy and that the UK had "an excellent ambassador to the US". Darroch was in London the next day for consultations with May that were said to have been long-planned.

==== Cables leak and resignation ====
On 7 July 2019, secret diplomatic cables from Darroch to the British government, dating from 2017 to 2019, were leaked to Steven Edginton, a 19-year-old freelance journalist and Brexit Party employee. (The most controversial item, however, according to Darroch's book, Collateral Damage, was not a cable but a confidential letter sent directly to the National Security Advisor, Mark Sedwill) where Darroch assessed the Trump administration as "inept and insecure". In response, Nigel Farage said Darroch was "totally unsuitable" for office, and Trump tweeted that Darroch was "not liked or well thought of within the US" and that "we will no longer deal with him". The Prime Minister, Theresa May, expressed support for Darroch and ordered a leak inquiry. It led to a criminal investigation into the leak by Scotland Yard.

On 10 July, Darroch resigned as Ambassador to the United States. He wrote that "the current situation is making it impossible for me to carry out my role as I would like". Previously, Boris Johnson, the frontrunner in the election to replace May, had declined to publicly support Darroch. Consensus among political commentators in the UK was that this made Darroch's position untenable. In the House of Commons, both May and the leader of the opposition, Jeremy Corbyn, praised Darroch's service and deplored that he had to resign under pressure from the United States. A spokesman for the Prime Minister said that it was an ambassador's job to provide "an honest and unvarnished view" of the US administration. Darroch remained in the post until the end of the year.

=== Later career ===
In 2020, Darroch wrote Collateral Damage: Britain, America and Europe in the Age of Trump.

On 19 September 2021, Darroch became Chairperson of non-partisan, internationalist campaign group, Best for Britain.

In 2026, Darroch took part in a TV series called The Wargame, hosted by Cathy Newman, in which members of the cast "reflect on the pressures of decision-making at the highest level and explore the wider questions raised".

== Honours ==
Darroch was appointed a Companion of Order of St Michael and St George (CMG) in the 1997 New Year Honours, and promoted to Knight Commander of the same order (KCMG) in the 2008 Birthday Honours.

He was nominated as a life peer in Theresa May's 2019 Resignation Honours List. He was created Baron Darroch of Kew, of St Mawes in the County of Cornwall on 11 November 2019. He made his maiden speech in the House of Lords on 26 November 2020, with a speech on the UK-Japan Comprehensive Economic Partnership Agreement.

== Personal life ==
In 1978, Darroch married Vanessa, who was a teacher at the British International School of Washington while her husband was ambassador to the United States. They have two children: Simon, a paleontologist based at Vanderbilt University who also studied at Durham, and Georgina, a botanist at Kew Gardens.

== See also ==
- List of Old Abingdonians
- List of Durham University people
- List of heads of missions of the United Kingdom

Government offices
| Preceded by Unknown | Director-General, Europe of the Foreign and Commonwealth Office; 2003–2004 | Succeeded by Nicola Brewer |
| Preceded by Sir Stephen Wall | Head of the Cabinet Office European Secretariat; 2004–2007 | Succeeded by Jon Cunliffe |
Diplomatic posts
| Preceded by Sir John Grant | UK Permanent Representative to the European Union; 2007–2011 | Succeeded by Sir Jon Cunliffe |
| Preceded by Sir Peter Westmacott | British Ambassador to the United States; 2016–2019 | Succeeded by Dame Karen Pierce |
Government offices
| Preceded by Sir Peter Ricketts | National Security Advisor; 2012–2015 | Succeeded by Sir Mark Lyall Grant |
Orders of precedence in the United Kingdom
| Preceded by The Lord Carter of Haslemere | Gentlemen; Baron Darroch of Kew | Followed by The Lord Goldsmith of Richmond Park |
