= Peter Ricketts =

British diplomat and life peer (born 1952)

The Right Honourable The Lord Ricketts GCMG GCVO
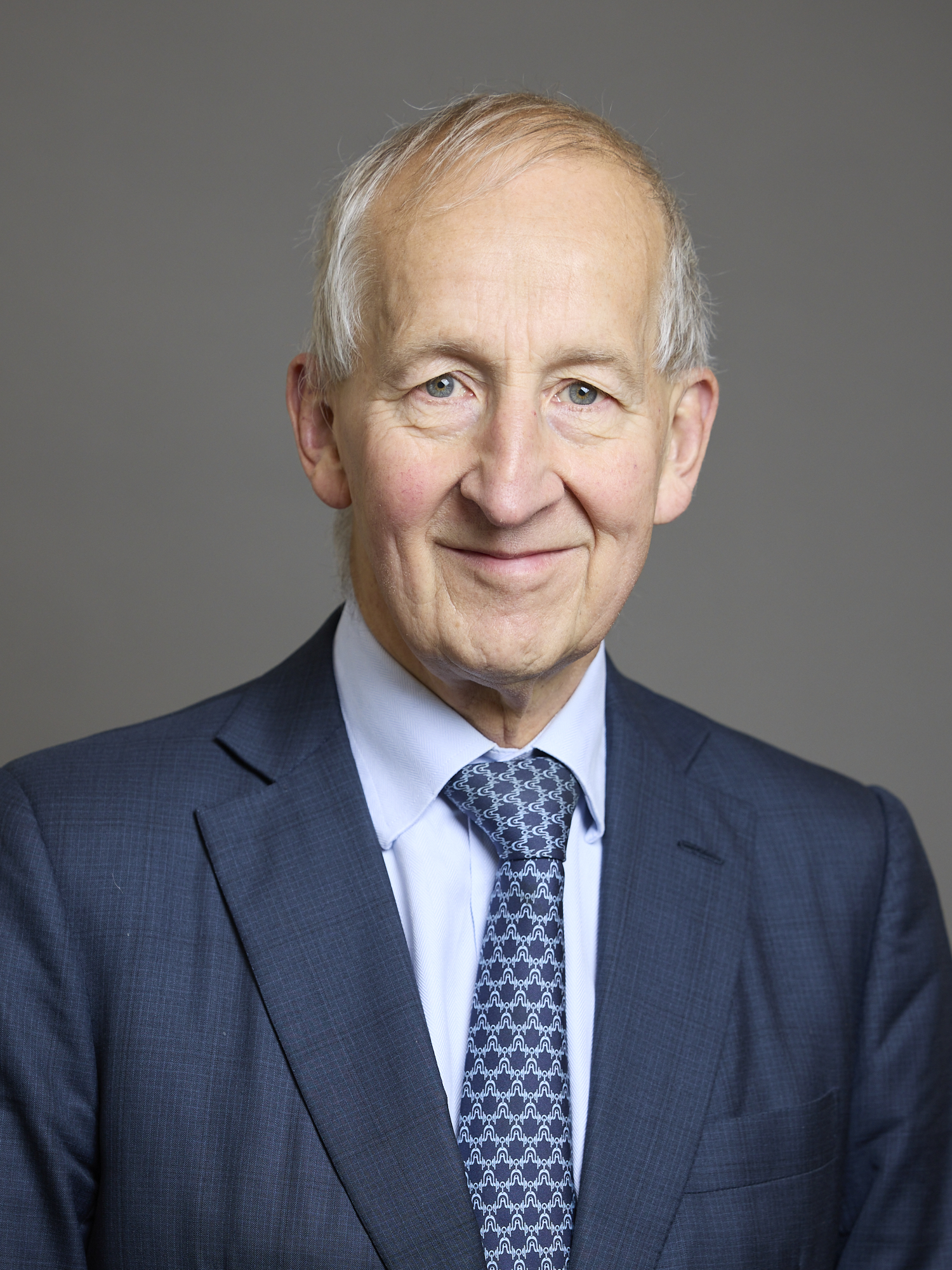
- Official portrait, 2024

British Ambassador to France
- In office 2012–2016
- Monarch: Elizabeth II
- Prime Minister: David Cameron
- Preceded by: Peter Westmacott
- Succeeded by: Julian King

United Kingdom National Security Advisor
- In office 12 May 2010 – 23 January 2012
- Prime Minister: David Cameron
- Preceded by: Position established
- Succeeded by: Kim Darroch

Permanent Secretary, Foreign and Commonwealth Office
- In office 2006–2010
- Prime Minister: Tony Blair; Gordon Brown
- Preceded by: Michael Jay
- Succeeded by: Simon Fraser

Member of the House of Lords
- Lord Temporal
- Life peerage 17 October 2016

Personal details
- Born: Peter Forbes Ricketts; 30 September 1952 (age 74) Sutton Coldfield, Warwickshire, England, UK
- Party: None (crossbencher)
- Spouse: Suzanne Ricketts
- Children: 2
- Education: Bishop Vesey's Grammar School
- Alma mater: Pembroke College, Oxford
- Occupation: Diplomat

Peter Forbes Ricketts, Baron Ricketts, GCMG, GCVO (born 30 September 1952) is a British life peer and retired senior diplomat. He has sat as a crossbencher in the House of Lords since 2016.

Ricketts served as chair of the Joint Intelligence Committee (JIC) under Prime Minister Tony Blair. He was the UK government's first national security adviser from 2010 from 2012, serving under Prime Minister David Cameron.

== Personal life ==
Ricketts attended Bishop Vesey's Grammar School, Sutton Coldfield, and Pembroke College, Oxford, where he read English Literature. He married Suzanne Horlington; they have two adult children.

== Diplomatic career ==
Ricketts began his career in the Foreign and Commonwealth Office in 1974 and served as the Assistant Private Secretary to former Foreign Secretary Geoffrey Howe. He later served as the Permanent Representative to NATO in Brussels. Apart from Brussels, he has been posted to Singapore, Washington DC and Paris.

He served under Prime Minister Tony Blair as Chairman of the Joint Intelligence Committee, leading him to give evidence to The Iraq Inquiry ("The Chilcot Report") in November 2009. From 2006 to 2010, Ricketts served under Blair and Prime Minister Gordon Brown as the Permanent Secretary for the Foreign and Commonwealth Office.

He served under Prime Minister David Cameron as the UK National Security Adviser from 2010 to 2012. He replaced Peter Westmacott as HM Ambassador to France effective January 2012, with Kim Darroch taking Ricketts's old role as National Security Adviser.

In January 2016, he stepped down as the UK Ambassador to France and retired from the Diplomatic Service.

== Public life ==
He was nominated for a life peerage in the 2016 Prime Minister's Resignation Honours and was created Baron Ricketts, of Shortlands in the County of Kent, on 17 October. He now sits as a crossbencher.

Between 2016 and January 2022, he served as a Strategic Adviser to Lockheed Martin UK.

In October 2020, a cross-party group of MPs and peers, supported by Lord Ricketts, planned legal action against Prime Minister Boris Johnson over the government's refusal to launch an inquiry into Russian interference in UK elections. The move followed the July 2020 publication of the Russia report by parliament's intelligence and security committee (ISC), which found that the government and intelligence services had failed to investigate Kremlin involvement in the 2016 EU referendum. The high court claim named Prime Minister Johnson as defendant.

In April 2022, Ricketts described Marine Le Pen's proposal for a Franco-British defence cooperation treaty as "ignorant and dangerous." He is the author of two books. Hard Choices: What Britain Does Next discusses the place of the Britain in a changing global order. His second book Peace Makers: Shaping the Modern World was published in 2026. It covers the activity of the foreign office during the Second World War.

== Honours ==
He was appointed CMG in the 1999 Birthday Honours, Knight Commander of the Order of St Michael and St George (KCMG) in 2003, Knight Grand Cross of the Order of St Michael and St George (GCMG) in the 2011 New Year Honours, and Knight Grand Cross of the Royal Victorian Order (GCVO) in 2014.

== Bibliography ==
- Hard Choices: What Britain Does Next, Atlantic Books, 2021. ISBN 978-1-83895-181-8.
- Peace Makers: Shaping the Modern World: The Men and Women of the Foreign Office in WWII, Aurum, 2026, ISBN 978-1-83600-901-6.

== See also ==
- Politics of the United Kingdom

Government offices
Preceded by Michael Pakenham	Chairman of the Joint Intelligence Committee; 2000–2001	Succeeded by John Scarlett
Preceded by Emyr Jones Parry	Director-General, Political of the Foreign and Commonwealth Office; 2001–2003	Succeeded by John Sawers
Diplomatic posts
Preceded by Emyr Jones Parry	Permanent Representative to the North Atlantic Council (NATO); 2003–2006	Succeeded by Stewart Eldon
Government offices
Preceded by Michael Jay	Permanent Under-Secretary of State; 2006–2010	Succeeded by Simon Fraser
Preceded by New position	Prime Minister’s National Security Adviser; 2010–2012	Succeeded by Kim Darroch
Diplomatic posts
Preceded by Peter Westmacott	British Ambassador to France; 2012–2016	Succeeded by Julian King
Orders of precedence in the United Kingdom
Preceded by The Lord Macpherson of Earl's Court	Gentlemen; Baron Ricketts	Followed by The Lord Llewellyn of Steep
