= Edward Llewellyn, Baron Llewellyn of Steep =

British Conservative politician

The Right Honourable The Lord Llewellyn of Steep CVO OBE PC
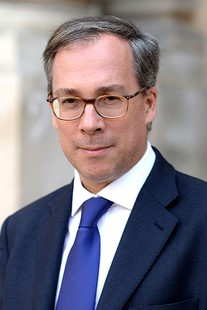
- Official portrait, 2017

Director General, Political at the Foreign, Commonwealth & Development Office
- Incumbent
- Assumed office September 2025
- Monarch: Charles III
- Prime Minister: Sir Keir Starmer; Andy Burnham
- Preceded by: Sir Christian Turner

British Ambassador to Italy
- In office April 7, 2022 – January 2026
- Monarchs: Elizabeth II; Charles III
- Prime Minister: Boris Johnson; Liz Truss; Rishi Sunak; Sir Keir Starmer
- Preceded by: Jill Morris
- Succeeded by: David Burton (as chargé d'affaires ad interim); Stephen Hickey

British Ambassador to France
- In office November 9, 2016 – August 8, 2021
- Monarch: Elizabeth II
- Prime Minister: Theresa May; Boris Johnson
- Preceded by: Julian King
- Succeeded by: Menna Rawlings

Downing Street Chief of Staff
- In office May 11, 2010 – July 13, 2016
- Prime Minister: David Cameron
- Deputy: Catherine Fall
- Preceded by: Jeremy Heywood
- Succeeded by: Fiona Hill; Nick Timothy

Chief of Staff to the Leader of HM Opposition
- In office December 6, 2005 – May 11, 2010
- Leader: David Cameron
- Preceded by: Stephen Sherbourne
- Succeeded by: Anna Healy

Member of the House of Lords
- Lord Temporal
- Life peerage October 20, 2016

Personal details
- Born: Edward David Gerard Llewellyn; 23 September 1965 (age 61)
- Party: Conservative
- Spouse: Dr Anne Charbord (m. 2010)
- Children: 3
- Education: Eton College; New College, Oxford

Edward David Gerard Llewellyn, Baron Llewellyn of Steep, CVO, OBE, PC (born 23 September 1965), is a British diplomat and former political adviser serving as the Director General Political and Political Director at the Foreign, Commonwealth and Development Office.

Previously HM Ambassador to France from 2016 to 2021, and British Ambassador to Italy from 2022 to 2026, he served as Downing Street Chief of Staff under Prime Minister David Cameron from 2010 to 2016.

== Early life and career ==
Llewellyn was educated at Sunningdale School, then Eton College, where he was a year above David Cameron. Llewellyn left Eton in 1983 and spent a brief amount of time working at Conservative Central Office, before going up to New College, Oxford, where he was Steward (i.e. President) of the College JCR. New College contemporaries include Rageh Omaar, Steve Hilton and Ian Katz.

The UK Government website states that Llewellyn spent four years (from 1988 to 1992) working for the Conservative Research Department, including a year as Private Secretary to Margaret Thatcher.

== Political career ==
After Oxford, Llewellyn was engaged as an aide to Governor Chris Patten in Hong Kong from 1992 to 1997, as a member of Patten's 'Cabinet' following Patten's appointment as a European Commissioner from 1999 to 2002, and then as Chief of Staff to former Liberal Democrat Leader Paddy Ashdown in his role as High Representative for Bosnia and Herzegovina from 2002 to 2005.

Appointed a Member of the Order of the British Empire (MBE) in the 1997 Birthday Honours, Llewellyn was promoted to Officer of the same Order (OBE) in the 2006 New Year Honours.

In July 2021, Lord Llewellyn was appointed an Honorary Captain in the Royal Naval Reserve.

=== Chief of Staff to David Cameron ===
Following David Cameron's victory at the Conservative leadership election in December 2005, Llewellyn was hired to be Cameron's personal chief of staff in his capacity as Leader of HM Opposition, continuing in this role until 2010.

=== Coalition negotiations ===
He served as part of the Conservative Party's negotiating team, along with George Osborne, William Hague and Oliver Letwin, when negotiating a prospective deal with the Liberal Democrats after the 2010 general election. Their negotiations being successful, the Conservative–LibDem coalition agreement was drawn up leading to the formation of the coalition government in 2010.

=== Downing Street Chief of Staff ===
Cameron became Prime Minister and appointed Llewellyn to the post of Downing Street Chief of Staff. In July 2011, several newspapers reported that Llewellyn asked Metropolitan Police Assistant Commissioner John Yates not to speak to Cameron about the News International phone hacking scandal.

On 14 May 2015 following the Conservatives' general election victory, Llewellyn was sworn of the Privy Council.

=== House of Lords ===
In August 2016, Llewellyn was nominated for elevation as a life peer in David Cameron's Resignation Honours, being created on 20 October 2016 as Baron Llewellyn of Steep, of Steep, in the County of Hampshire. Introduced by Lord Patten of Barnes and Lord Hague of Richmond on 31 October, Lord Llewellyn took his seat on the Conservative benches in the House of Lords.

== Diplomatic career ==
=== Ambassador to France ===
Appointed British Ambassador to France, on 23 September 2016, Llewellyn took office on 9 November 2016. Lord Llewellyn took a leave of absence from Parliament, as is customary while on His Majesty's Diplomatic Service.

Succeeded in Paris by Dame Menna Rawlings in summer 2021, it was announced Lord Llewellyn would receive another diplomatic appointment.

=== Ambassador to Italy ===
Nominated on 18 January 2022 as British Ambassador to Italy and non-resident Ambassador Extraordinary to San Marino in succession to Jill Morris, Llewellyn presented his credentials to President Sergio Mattarella at the Quirinal Palace on 7 April 2022.

Lord and Lady Llewellyn resided at the Villa Wolkonsky in Rome.

In 2025, Lord Llewellyn was appointed Commander of the Royal Victorian Order (CVO) in connection with the State visit of King Charles III and Queen Camilla to Italy.

=== Director General, Political ===
In September 2025 he was appointed Director General, Political at the Foreign, Commonwealth & Development Office. In this role he succeeds Sir Christian Turner who became UK ambassador to the United States.

The DG, Political will act as an "international fixer and strategic foreign policy adviser".

Government offices
Preceded by Jeremy Heywood	Downing Street Chief of Staff; 2010–2016	Succeeded by Fiona Hill; Nick Timothy
Diplomatic posts
Preceded by Sir Julian King	British Ambassador to France; 2016–2021	Succeeded by Dame Menna Rawlings
Preceded by Jill Morris	British Ambassador to Italy; 2022–2026	Succeeded by David Burton (chargé a.i.); Stephen Hickey
Preceded by Christian Turner	Director General, Political at the Foreign, Commonwealth & Development Office; September 2025 -	Succeeded by Incumbent
Orders of precedence in the United Kingdom
Preceded by The Lord Ricketts	Gentlemen; Baron Llewellyn of Steep	Followed by The Lord Duncan of Springbank
