= Michael Jay, Baron Jay of Ewelme =

British politician and diplomat (born 1946)

The Right Honourable The Lord Jay of Ewelme GCMG
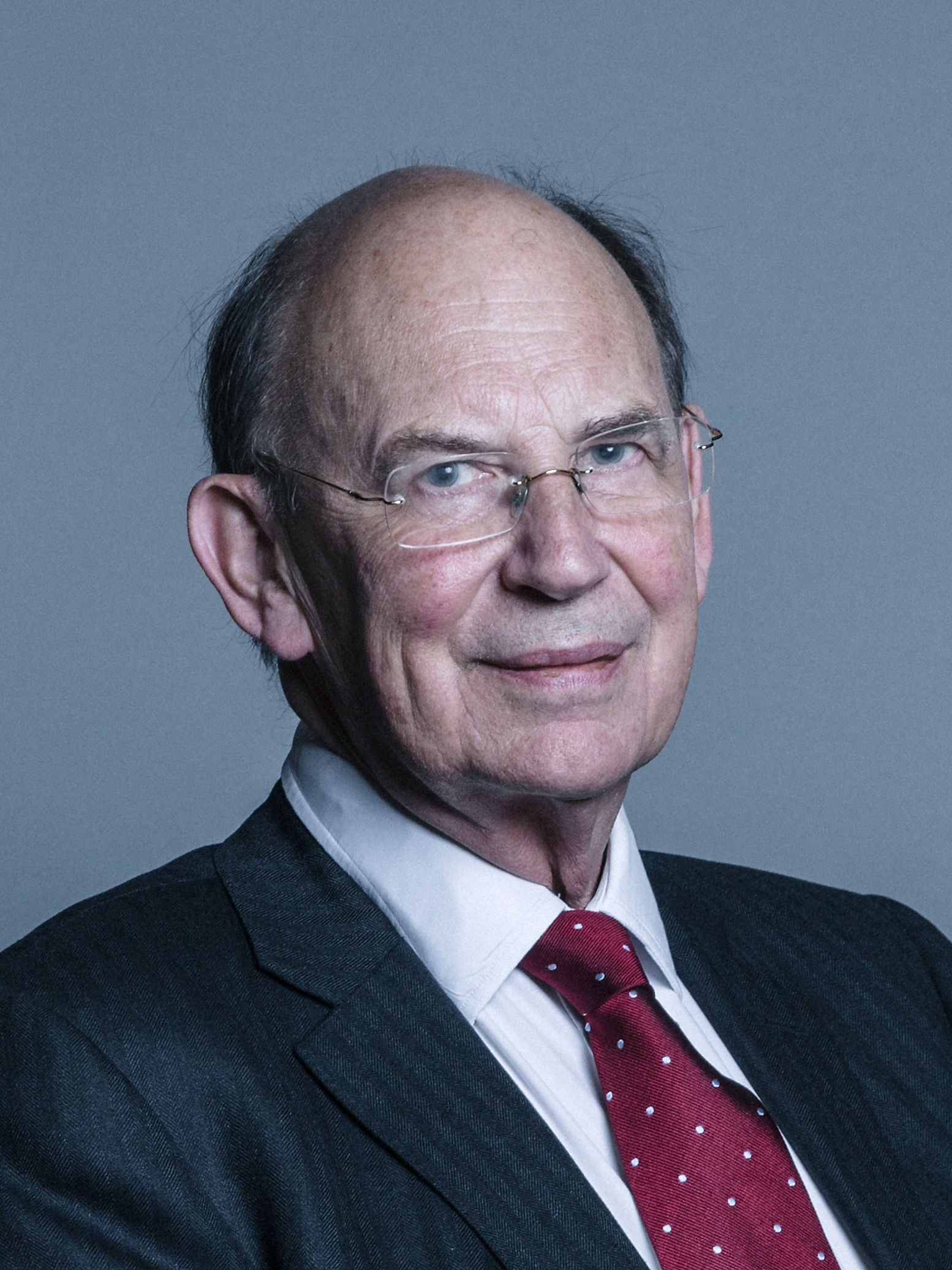

Permanent Under Secretary of State of the Foreign and Commonwealth Office
- In office 2002–2006
- Preceded by: Sir John Kerr
- Succeeded by: Sir Peter Ricketts

Chairman of the House of Lords Appointments Commission
- In office 23 July 2008 – 19 July 2013
- Preceded by: The Lord Stevenson
- Succeeded by: The Lord Kakkar

Member of the House of Lords
- Lord Temporal
- Life peerage 18 September 2006

Personal details
- Born: Michael Hastings Jay; 19 June 1946 (age 80)
- Education: Magdalen College, Oxford; SOAS University of London

Michael Hastings Jay, Baron Jay of Ewelme, GCMG (born 19 June 1946) is a British politician and former diplomat. He sits as a Crossbench member of the House of Lords, and previously served as Ambassador to France and Permanent Under Secretary at the Foreign and Commonwealth Office.

== Education ==
Jay was born in Hampshire and educated at Winchester College, Magdalen College, Oxford, at which he read Philosophy, Politics and Economics and of which he is an honorary fellow, and the University of London's School of Oriental and African Studies (SOAS). He served as a volunteer teacher in Zambia.

== Diplomatic career ==
Jay joined the Ministry of Overseas Development in 1969, serving in London, Washington (at the World Bank) in 1973 and as First Secretary (Development) at the British High Commission, New Delhi, in 1978. He transferred to the Foreign and Commonwealth Office in 1981, serving as Private Secretary to the Permanent Under-Secretary of State. As Counsellor he served in the European Secretariat of the Cabinet Office from 1985 to 1987. He was posted as Counsellor in the Paris Embassy from 1987 to 1990, returning to the FCO as Director for European Affairs until 1994. He was appointed Director General for European and Economic Affairs 1994–96, following which he became a Senior Associate Member of St Antony's College, Oxford.

From July 1996 to September 2001, he was British Ambassador to France. During this tenure, he was the first British official to speak publicly on the death of Diana, Princess of Wales in August 1997. In July 2001, he was appointed Permanent Under-Secretary of State for Foreign Affairs and thus Head of the Diplomatic Service, a post he took up on 14 January 2002.

In 2005 and 2006, Jay served as the Prime Minister's Personal Representative (Sherpa) for the G8 summits at Gleneagles and St Petersburg in addition to his PUS duties.

He was appointed a Companion of the Order of St Michael & St George in the 1992 Birthday Honours, promoted to Knight Commander in the 1997 New Year Honours and made a Knight Grand Cross in the 2006 Birthday Honours.

== Post-retirement ==
Upon his retirement from HM Diplomatic Service on 27 July 2006, he was recommended for a life peerage, and this was gazetted as Baron Jay of Ewelme, of Ewelme in the County of Oxfordshire, on 18 September 2006.

Lord Jay of Ewelme was the Chair of Merlin, the British health and medical aid agency, from 2007 until 2013. He has been a non-executive director of Associated British Foods (2006–), Credit Agricole (2007–2011), EDF (2009–), Candover PLC (2008–)and Valeo SA (2007–). He is a trustee of the Thomson Reuters Founders share company (2013–), and chairman of the Advisory Council of the British Library (2011 –).

He was chairman of the House of Lords Appointments Commission from 2008 to 2013, and has served on sub-committees C, E and F of the House of Lords Select Committee on European Union affairs.

== Family ==
Jay married Sylvia Mylroie in 1975. In 2005, Lady Jay was appointed vice-chairman of L'Oréal UK & Ireland, then chairman from 2011 to 2013. She has been a non-executive director on the board of Alcatel-Lucent, and is non-executive director of St-Gobain, Lazard and Casino Group.

She is chairman of the Pilgrim Trust, and has been a trustee of the Prison Reform Trust and the Entente Cordiale Scholarship Scheme.

In 2019, she was appointed as High Sheriff of Oxfordshire.

== Arms ==
Coat of arms of Michael Jay, Baron Jay of Ewelme
Adopted 2007 Coronet Coronet of a Baron Crest Upon a helm with a wreath Argent Or and Sable an Otter sejant erect Sable holding with both forepaws and blowing a Trumpet Or Escutcheon Per saltire Argent and Sable two Clarions in pale each ensigned with an Ancient Crown Sable and two Clarions in fess Argent each ensigned by an Ancient Crown Or. Supporters On either side a Manx Shearwater contourny supporting with the wings addorsed and inverted Proper beaked and legged Or in the beak a trefoil slipped also Or. Motto In Homines Benevolentia (Goodwill To Men) Badge An otter's face Sable anciently crowned Or. Symbolism The grantee's career in the Foreign and Commonwealth Office is reflected in the pelagic Manx Shearwaters. The latter's short legs prevent them from supporting the shield with a foot in a satisfactory manner. Accordingly, they have been shown contourny, thus enabling them to support with the wings. The natural black and white of the shearwater is reflected in the Arms which are divided to represent North, South, East, and West. Crown service is reflected in the coronets which ensign clarions which, in turn, suggest the initial J. General proclamation and industry is found with the trumpet-blowing otter in the crest. An industrious otter in the Crown Service is an idea repeated in the Badge.

== Offices held ==
Diplomatic posts
Preceded by Sir Christopher Mallaby	British Ambassador to France; 1996–2001	Succeeded by Sir John Holmes
Government offices
Preceded by Unknown	Director-General, European and Economic Affairs of the Foreign and Commonwealth Office; 1994–1996	Succeeded by Unknown
Preceded by Sir John Kerr	Permanent Secretary of the Foreign and Commonwealth Office; 2002–2006	Succeeded by Sir Peter Ricketts
Other offices
Preceded by The Lord Stevenson of Coddenham	Chairman of the House of Lords Appointments Commission; 2008–2013	Succeeded by The Lord Kakkar
Orders of precedence in the United Kingdom
Preceded by The Lord Bilimoria	Gentlemen; Baron Jay of Ewelme	Followed by The Lord Walker of Aldringham
