= John Holmes (British diplomat) =

British diplomat (born 1951)

Sir John Holmes GCVO KBE CMG
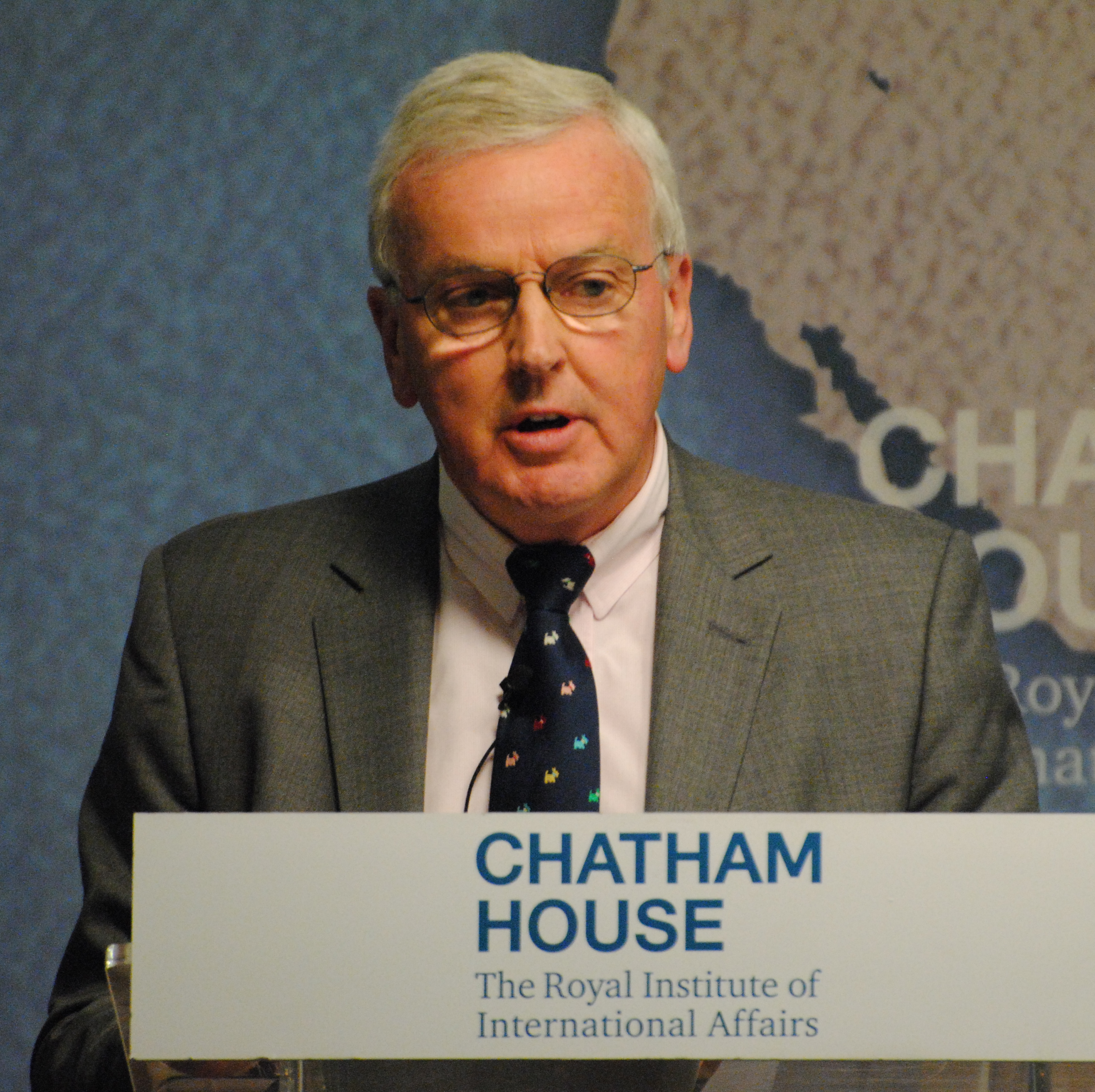
- Holmes at Chatham House in 2016

British Ambassador to France
- In office 2001–2006
- Monarch: Elizabeth II
- Prime Minister: Tony Blair
- Preceded by: Michael Jay
- Succeeded by: Peter Westmacott

British Ambassador to Portugal
- In office 1999–2001
- Monarch: Elizabeth II
- Prime Minister: Tony Blair
- Preceded by: Stephen Wall
- Succeeded by: Glynne Evans

Principal Private Secretary to the Prime Minister
- In office 1997–1999
- Prime Minister: Tony Blair
- Preceded by: Alex Allan
- Succeeded by: Jeremy Heywood

Personal details
- Born: John Eaton Holmes; 29 April 1951 (age 74) Preston
- Spouse: Penelope Morris (m. 1976)
- Children: 3
- Education: Preston Grammar School
- Alma mater: Balliol College, Oxford
- Awards: CMG (1997); CVO (1998); KBE (1999); GCVO (2004)

Sir John Eaton Holmes GCVO KBE CMG (born 29 April 1951) is a British former diplomat who is the current Chairman of the Electoral Commission.

== Early life ==
Holmes was born on 29 April 1951 in Preston, in the north of England. He was educated at Preston Grammar School and went on to study Greats at Balliol College, Oxford. He was brought up in Penwortham, a middle-class suburb of Preston, where he went to school at Crookings Lane Primary and was in the same class as Howard Mendel, a Natural History Museum entomologist. Holmes played cricket for Lancashire schoolboys and was also a tennis player. He was a member of Penwortham Congregational Tennis Club where he won the junior singles as a teenager. He entered the Welsh Open as a student and was defeated by Buster Mottram. Holmes also played football as a schoolboy, representing Penwortham Hill Rovers junior side. One of the coaches for Penwortham Hill Rovers was Tommy Lawrenson, father of the Liverpool footballer, Mark Lawrenson who grew up in Blundell Lane, Penwortham, a few hundred yards from Holmes's house at 23 Queensway. Holmes's father was an English teacher at Preston Grammar. His mother was also an educated woman but didn't work full-time. His elder brother David too was a pupil at Preston Grammar.

== Career ==
He entered the Foreign and Commonwealth Office (FCO) in 1973. After spending three years as a desk officer in London, including a period of temporary duty at the British Mission to the UN in New York, he was appointed to the British Embassy in Moscow as a 3rd Secretary Chancery, and subsequently promoted 2nd Secretary.

On returning to the FCO in 1978, he first took up an appointment in the Near East and North Africa Department before becoming Assistant Private Secretary to the Foreign Secretary in 1982.

In 1984 Holmes was posted to the British Embassy in Paris as 1st Secretary (Economic). He returned to London in 1987 as Assistant Head of the Soviet Department and between 1989 and 1991 he was seconded to Thomas De La Rue & Co, before moving to India as Economic and Commercial Counsellor at the High Commission in New Delhi.

He returned to London in 1995, first as Head of the European Union Department in FCO and then as Private Secretary, and subsequently Principal Private Secretary to the Prime Minister, Tony Blair. Between 1999 and autumn 2001, John Holmes was Ambassador to Portugal. He was Ambassador to France from October 2001 until 2007. From January 2007 to August 2010 he was Under-Secretary-General for Humanitarian Affairs and Emergency Relief Coordinator, appointed by United Nations Secretary-General Ban Ki-moon. In February 2008 after eight months of the blocking of the crossings into Gaza by the Israelis, Holmes described the situation of the people of Gaza as "grim and miserable" and pointed out they were living on a tenth of what had been available a year earlier.

In 2012, at the request of the Ministry of Defence, he conducted an Independent Medal Review of post 1945 campaign medals, his findings being accepted by the Government.

== Later life ==
He was director of the Ditchley Foundation from September 2010 to August 2016, succeeding Sir Jeremy Greenstock. He became Chair of the Electoral Commission in January 2017.

== Personal life ==
In 1976 he married Penelope Morris, an author and trustee of Women for Women UK; the couple have three daughters: Sarah, Lucy and Emilie.

== Honours ==
Holmes was appointed CMG in 1997 in the Resignation Honours List of former Prime Minister John Major for his service as Principal Private Secretary. In 1998 he was appointed CVO and in the New Year Honours of 1999 appointed KBE on the recommendation of Tony Blair on leaving the senior job at No. 10 Downing Street, a higher honour than normally bestowed, because of his work on the Northern Ireland Peace Talks. In 2004 Queen Elizabeth II promoted him to GCVO at the conclusion of her state visit to France to celebrate the 100th anniversary of the Entente Cordiale.

== Publications ==
- The Politics of Humanity: The Reality of Relief Aid, Head of Zeus, London, 2013. ISBN 1781850917

Government offices
| Preceded by Alex Allan | Principal Private Secretary to the Prime Minister; 1997–1999 | Succeeded by Jeremy Heywood |
Diplomatic posts
| Preceded by Stephen Wall | British Ambassador to Portugal; 1999–2001 | Succeeded by Dame Glynne Evans |
| Preceded by Sir Michael Jay | British Ambassador to France; 2001–2006 | Succeeded by Sir Peter Westmacott |
Positions in intergovernmental organisations
| Preceded by Jan Egeland ( (Norway) ) | Under-Secretary-General for Humanitarian Affairs and Emergency Relief Coordinator; 2007–2010 | Succeeded by Valerie Amos, Baroness Amos ( (United Kingdom) ) |
