= Joanna Roper =

British diplomat (born 1969)

Her Excellency Joanna Roper CMG
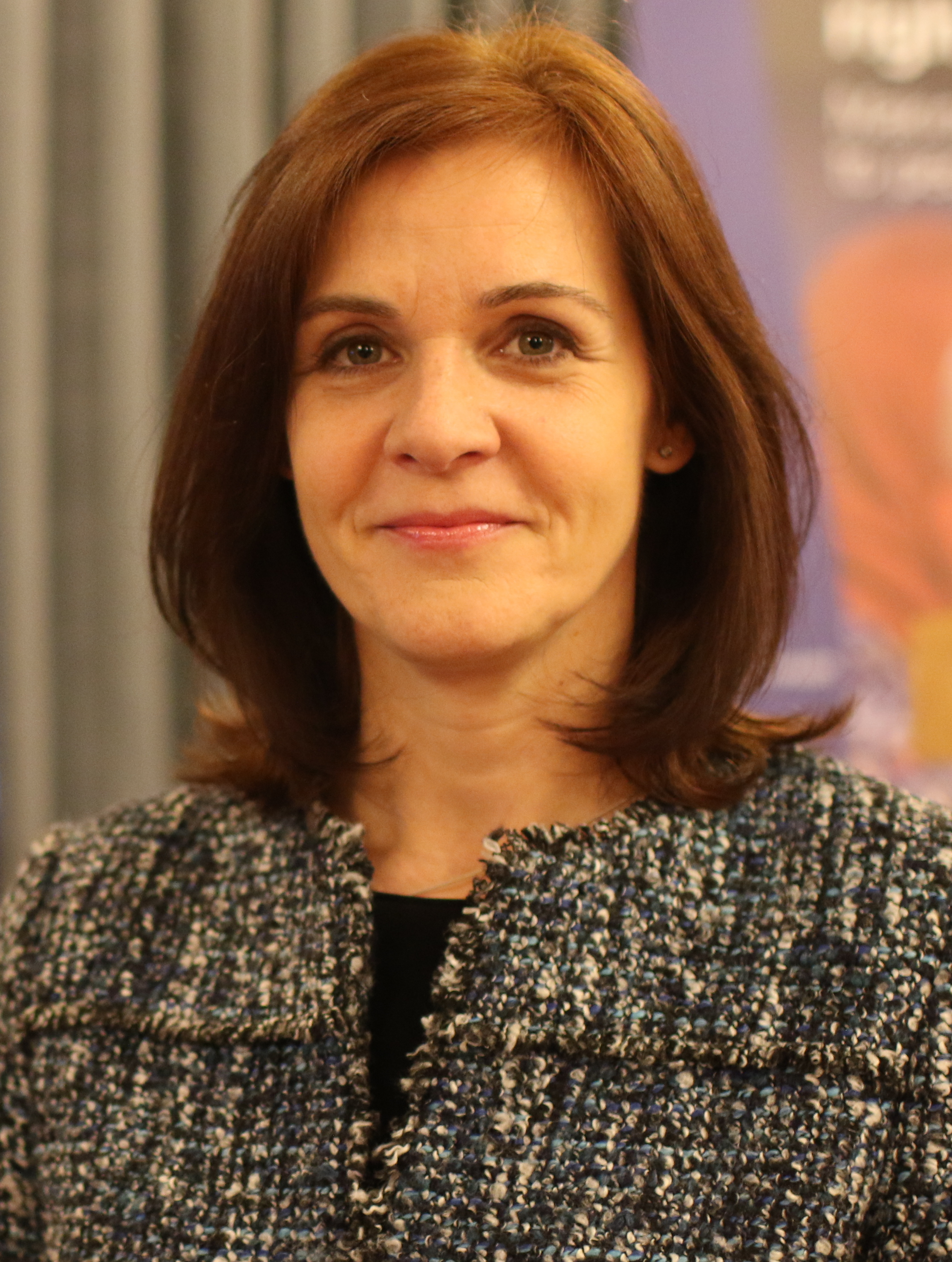

British Ambassador to the Netherlands
- In office 7 October 2020 – July 2025
- Monarchs: Elizabeth II; Charles III
- Prime Minister: Boris Johnson; Liz Truss; Rishi Sunak; Keir Starmer
- Preceded by: Peter Wilson
- Succeeded by: Chris Rampling

Personal details
- Born: Joanna Louise Wardale; 20 February 1969 (age 57) Hampshire, England
- Spouse: Sir Thomas Drew (m. 2016)
- Relations: Robert Edward Wardale (f); Elizabeth Anne Roper (m)
- Education: University of Kent (BA, Hon. DUniv); SOAS (MA)
- Awards: CMG (2016)

Joanna Louise Roper (born 20 February 1969), formally styled Lady Drew, is a British diplomat who served as the British Ambassador to the Netherlands and Permanent Representative of the United Kingdom to the Organisation for the Prohibition of Chemical Weapons (OPCW) at The Hague from October 2020 to July 2025.

== Career ==
After working in the Home Office from 1992 to 2000, Roper joined the Foreign and Commonwealth Office (FCO) in 2001.

Appointed as the FCO's Special Envoy for Gender Equality in 2017, Roper's former posts included serving as deputy head and then interim head of the FCO's Counter-Terrorism Department (2008–2010), head of the FCO's China Department (2012–2014), as well as director of the United Kingdom's worldwide consular services.

As a diplomat, Roper has served in postings to Japan, Pakistan and China.

== Personal life ==
In 2016, Roper married fellow diplomat, Sir Thomas Drew, the Ambassador to France as of 2026.

== Honours ==
Roper was appointed a Companion of the Order of St Michael and St George (CMG) in the 2016 Queen's Birthday Honours "for services to British foreign policy and the protection of British nationals overseas".

== See also ==
- Embassy of the United Kingdom, The Hague
