= Julian King (diplomat) =

British diplomat (born 1964)

Sir Julian King GCMG KCVO
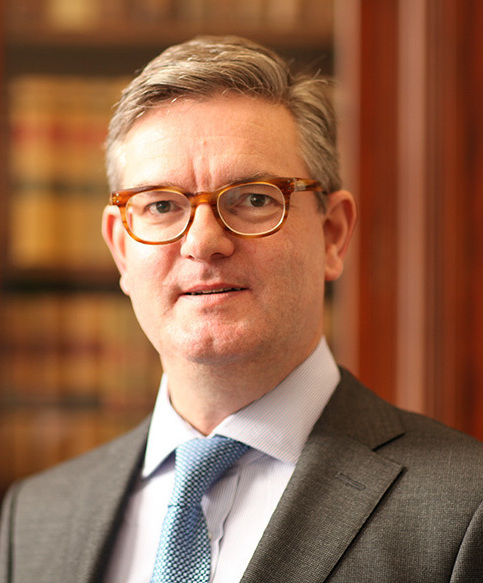
- Official portrait, 2015

European Commissioner for the Security Union
- In office 19 September 2016 – 30 November 2019
- Nominated by: David Cameron
- Commission: Juncker
- Preceded by: Office established
- Succeeded by: Margaritis Schinas (Promoting the European Way of Life)

British Ambassador to France
- In office 15 February 2016 – 19 September 2016
- Monarch: Elizabeth II
- Prime Minister: David Cameron; Theresa May
- Preceded by: Peter Ricketts
- Succeeded by: The Lord Llewellyn of Steep

British Ambassador to Ireland
- In office 2009–2011
- Monarch: Elizabeth II
- Prime Minister: Gordon Brown; David Cameron
- Preceded by: David Reddaway
- Succeeded by: Dominick Chilcott

Personal details
- Born: Julian Beresford King; 22 August 1964 (age 62) Sutton Coldfield, England
- Party: Independent
- Education: St Peter's College, Oxford; École nationale d'administration

Sir Julian Beresford King GCMG KCVO (born 22 August 1964) is a British diplomat and civil servant who served as the final British European Commissioner from 2016 to 2019 prior to Brexit, having previously served as the British ambassador to Ireland (2009–2011) and France (2016).

== Education ==
King attended Bishop Vesey's Grammar School, one of the oldest schools in Britain, in Sutton Coldfield. He gained a BA in Philosophy and Theology from St Peter's College, Oxford. He also studied at the École nationale d'administration in Paris where he met his future wife.

== Career ==
He joined the Foreign and Commonwealth Office in 1985.

After the resignation of Jonathan Hill as the British European Commissioner and European Commissioner for Financial Stability, Financial Services and Capital Markets Union in the aftermath of the Brexit referendum, Prime Minister David Cameron nominated King to replace him.

On 2 August 2016, European Commission President Jean-Claude Juncker announced his intention to allocate the new portfolio of Security Union to King. King would work under the supervision of First Vice-President Frans Timmermans. The European Parliament confirmed his appointment on 15 September 2016; the Council of the European Union did so on 19 September 2016. With the United Kingdom's withdrawal from the European Union on 31 January 2020, he was the last British official to hold a position and portfolio within the European Commission.

=== Diplomatic career ===
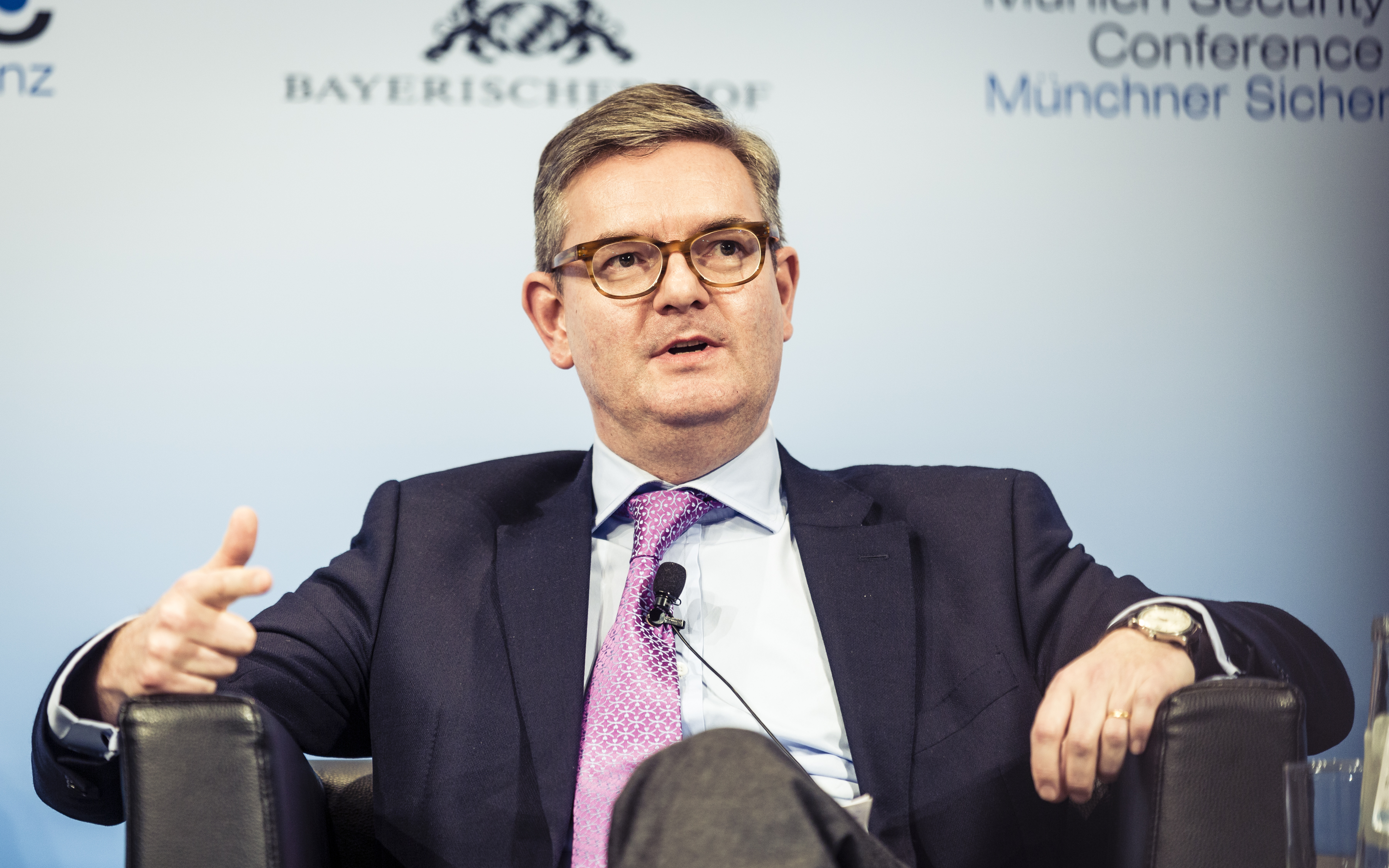
King during the MSC 2017

- 1985–1987 Foreign office in London
- 1987–1988 École nationale d'administration
- 1989–1990 Private Secretary to the British Ambassador (Sir Ewen Fergusson) in Paris
- 1991–1992 worked on European common foreign and security policy (CFSP) in Luxembourg, the Hague, Lisbon then London
- 1993–1995 London, working on European defence and NATO issues
- 1998–2002 Brussels, working on relations with Turkey, European defence, CFSP and EU enlargement
- 2003–2004 Counsellor and Head of Chancery at UK mission to the United Nations in New York City (covering UN Security Council business in the period after the Iraq War)
- 2004–2007 UK Permanent Representative to the EU Political and Security Committee in Brussels, covering common foreign and security policy (CFSP).
- 2005 Chaired the EU Political and Security Committee during the UK presidency
- 2008–2009 Head of the office of the British Commissioner in Brussels (Peter Mandelson then Baroness Ashton). Represented the EU27 on international trade matters, including negotiations on the WTO Doha Round.
- 2009–2011 British Ambassador to Ireland. Organised the State Visit to Ireland by Queen Elizabeth in May 2011.
- 2011–2014 Director-General of the Northern Ireland Office
- 2014–2015 Director-General Economic & Consular Affairs, Foreign and Commonwealth Office
- 2016-2016 British Ambassador to France
- 2016–2019 European Commissioner for the Security Union

== Honours ==
King was appointed Companion of the Order of St Michael and St George (CMG) in 2006. He was dubbed Knight Commander of the Royal Victorian Order (KCVO) by Queen Elizabeth during a visit to Belfast on 24 June 2014, when he relinquished his appointment as Director-General of the Northern Ireland Office. He was appointed Knight Grand Cross of the Order of St Michael and St George (GCMG) in the 2020 Birthday Honours for services to security in Europe.

== Personal life ==
He married a Danish colleague, Lotte Knudsen in 1992 near Gers in south-west France. They had met as students in Paris and still have a house near where they married. Lotte Knudsen is currently Managing Director, Human Rights, Global & Multilateral Issues in the European External Action Service (EEAS) and previously held senior posts in the European Commission, including as Director for Justice Matters in the Directorate-General for Justice, Freedom and Security

Diplomatic posts
Preceded by David Reddaway	British Ambassador to Ireland; 2009–2012	Succeeded by Dominick Chilcott
Preceded by Peter Ricketts	British Ambassador to France; 2016	Succeeded by The Lord Llewellyn of Steep
Political offices
Preceded by The Lord Hill of Oareford	British European Commissioner; 2016–2019	Last
New office	European Commissioner for the Security Union; 2016–2019	Succeeded by Margaritis Schinas as European Commissioner for Promoting the European Way of Life
