= Embassy of the United Kingdom, Paris =

Coordinates: 48.8692°N 2.3188°E

British Embassy, Paris
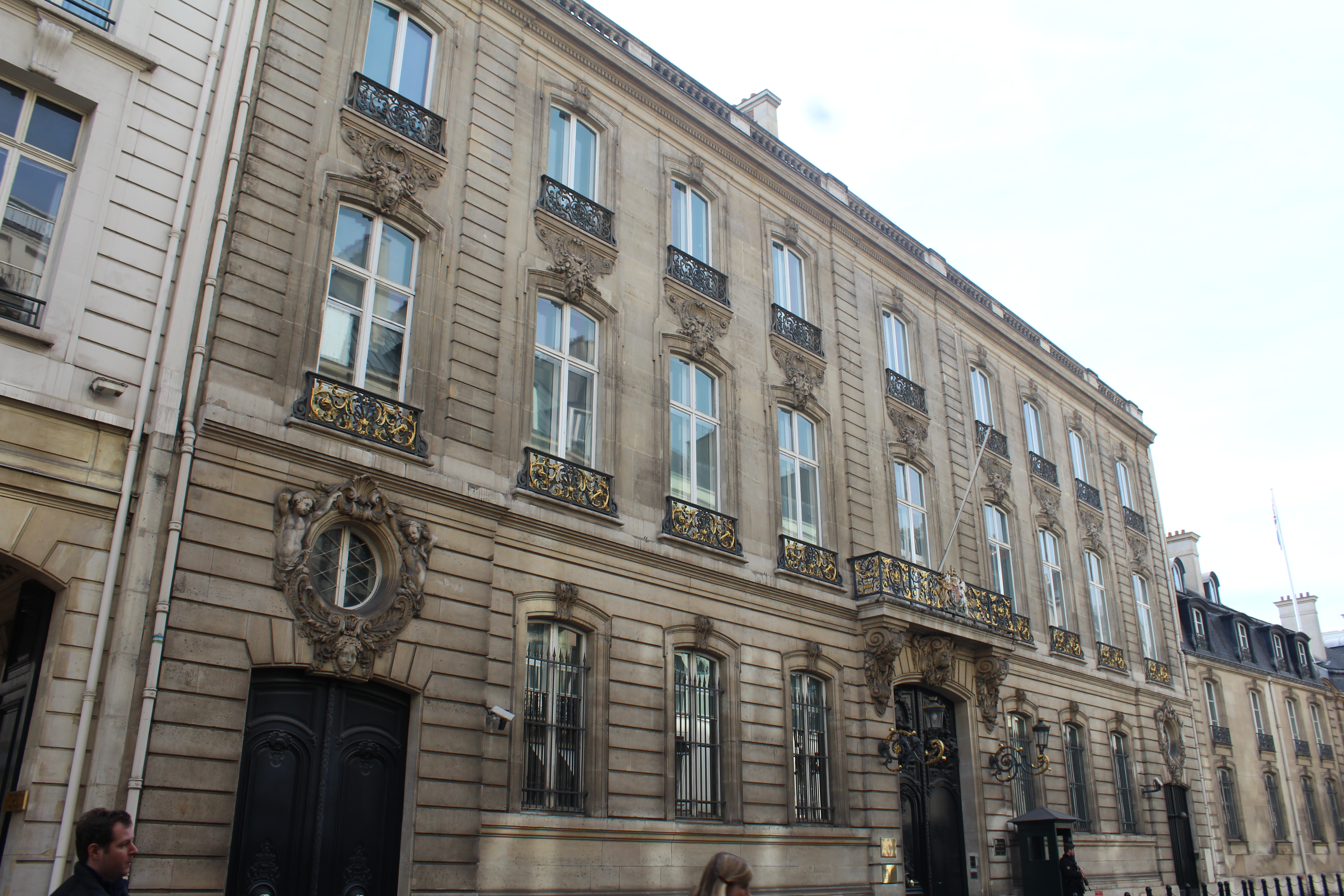
- The embassy building in Paris
- Location: Paris, France
- Address: 35, rue du Faubourg Saint-Honoré, 75383 Paris, France
- Ambassador: Thomas Drew
- Jurisdiction: France
- Website: British Embassy, Paris

The Embassy of the United Kingdom in Paris is the chief diplomatic mission of the United Kingdom in France. It is located on one of the most famous streets in France, rue du Faubourg Saint-Honoré in the 8th arrondissement of Paris. The current British Ambassador to France is Thomas Drew. The embassy also represents the British Overseas Territories in France.

There are British consulates in Bordeaux and Marseille.

== History ==
During World War II and the Nazi occupation of France, the embassy's archives were burned as its staff fled the building to go south with the civilian Vichy regime from 1940 to 1944 to escape the German military, placing the embassy building, as well as several other buildings representing British interests in Paris, under Swiss protection in the meantime.

The embassy reopened after the liberation of Paris in September 1944 which had been closed since June 1940. As a matter of priority following the liberation, a Dakota aircraft, with an escort of 45 Spitfires, flew across to Paris carrying the new British Ambassador to France, Alfred ‘Duff’ Cooper.

In November 1944, the embassy hosted a dinner for Winston Churchill who was in Paris for his first visit since liberation for the Armistice commemoration. The dinner guests included Charles de Gaulle, their foreign ministers, and the US, Russian and Canadian ambassadors.

== Ambassador's Residence ==
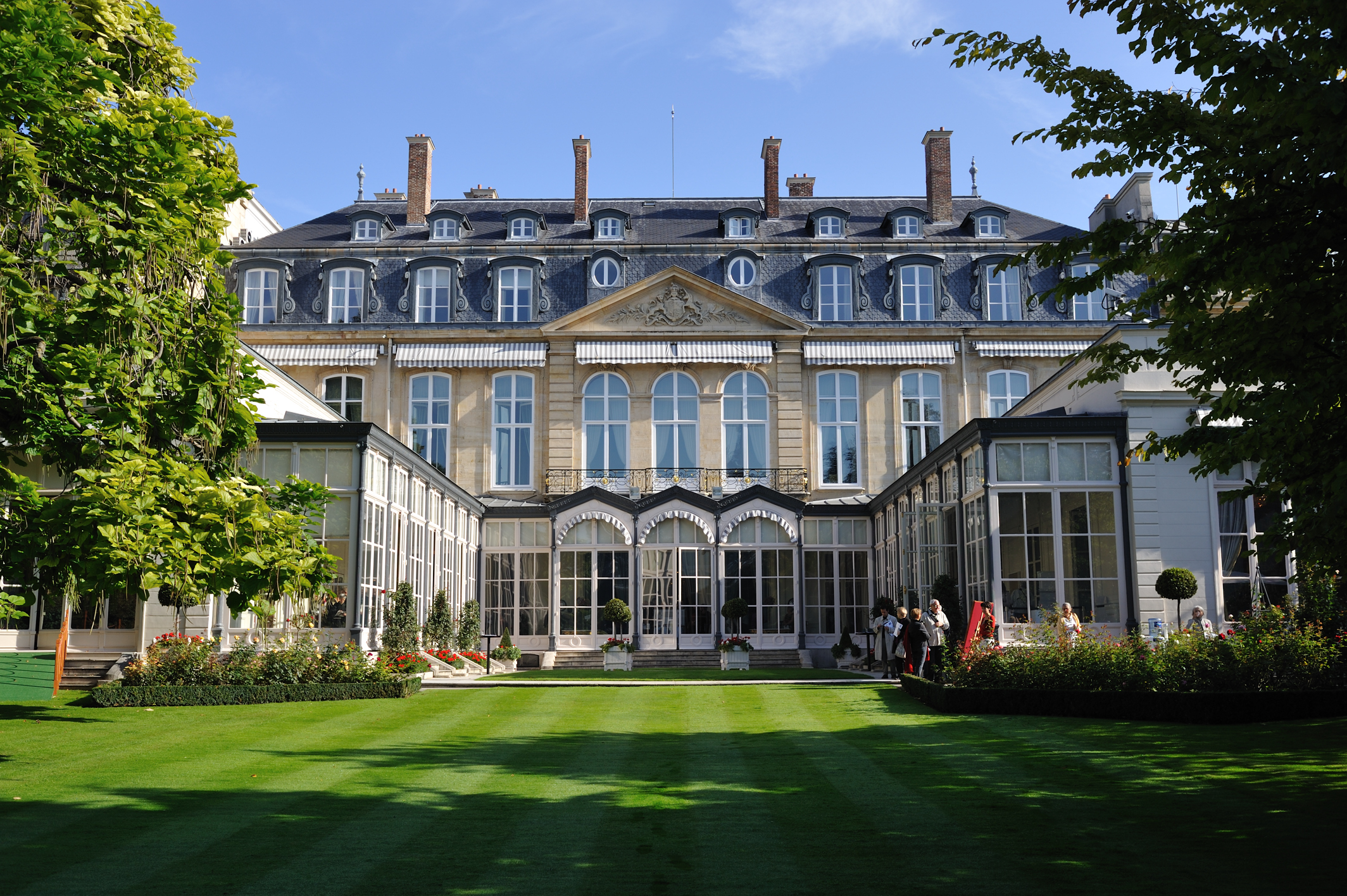
Hôtel de Charost, the official residence of the British Ambassador

The official residence of the British ambassador to France since 1814 has been the Hôtel de Charost, located at 39 rue du Faubourg Saint-Honoré, just a few doors down from the Élysée Palace. It was built in 1720 and bought by the Duke of Wellington in 1814. Napoleon's sister, Princess Borghese, joined her brother in exile to Elba, an Italian island located near the coasts of Tuscany. Penury forced the sale of this house on rue du Faubourg Saint-Honoré to the British government for use as their embassy. It had been the home of the Duke of Wellington for 5 months because he had been appointed Britain's ambassador to the court of Louis XVIII.

== See also ==
- France-United Kingdom relations
- List of diplomatic missions in France
- List of ambassadors of the United Kingdom to France
- Embassy of France, London
