= Peter Westmacott =

British diplomat

Sir Peter Westmacott GCMG LVO
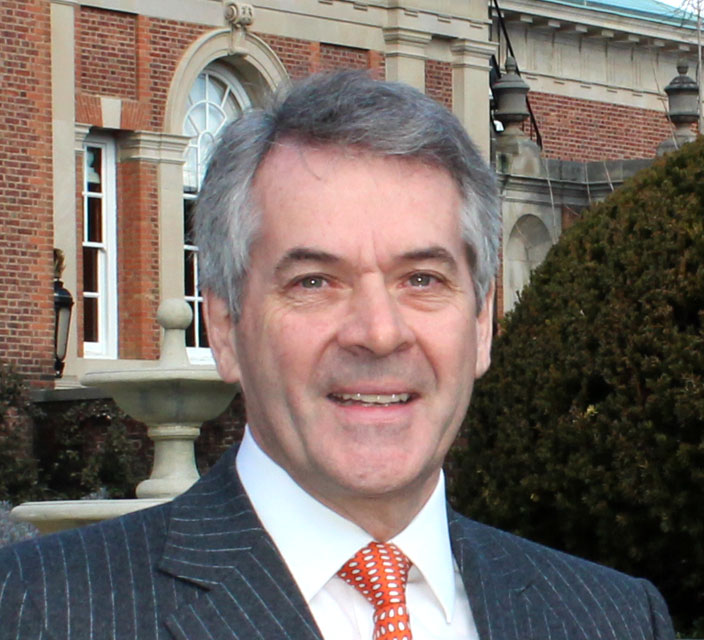
- Westmacott in 2013

British Ambassador to the United States
- In office 28 January 2012 – 28 January 2016
- Monarch: Elizabeth II
- President: Barack Obama
- Prime Minister: David Cameron
- Preceded by: Sir Nigel Sheinwald
- Succeeded by: Sir Kim Darroch

British Ambassador to France
- In office 2007–2012
- Monarch: Elizabeth II
- Prime Minister: Gordon Brown; David Cameron
- Preceded by: Sir John Holmes
- Succeeded by: Sir Peter Ricketts

British Ambassador to Turkey
- In office 2002–2006
- Monarch: Elizabeth II
- Prime Minister: Tony Blair
- Preceded by: Sir David Logan
- Succeeded by: Nick Baird

Personal details
- Born: Peter John Westmacott; 23 December 1950 (age 75) Edington, Somerset, England
- Spouses: Angela Lugg (m. 1972); Susan Nemazee (m. 2001)
- Relations: Herbert Westmacott (cousin)
- Children: 3
- Education: Taunton School
- Alma mater: New College, Oxford
- Occupation: Diplomat

Sir Peter John Westmacott GCMG LVO (born 23 December 1950) is a senior British diplomat, who was British Ambassador to Turkey, then Ambassador to France (2007 to 2011) and finally Ambassador to the United States from January 2012 to January 2016, succeeding Sir Nigel Sheinwald, a posting announced by the Prime Minister's Office on 24 June 2011.

== Career ==
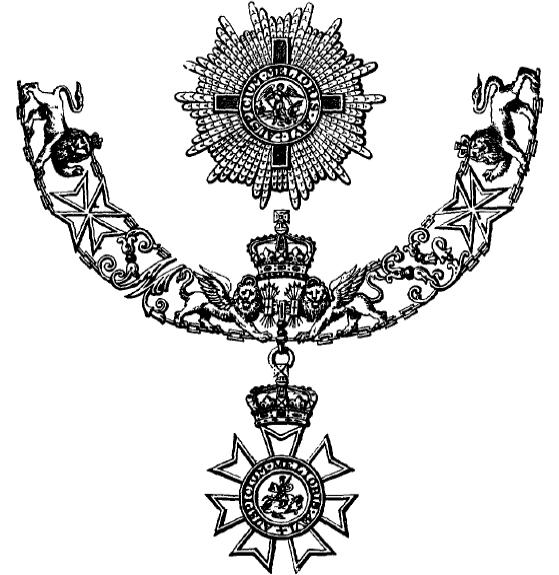
GCMG Collar and Breast Star

Westmacott joined the Foreign and Commonwealth Office in 1972, and his first overseas posting was as Second Secretary at Tehran, Iran, in 1974. In 1978, he was sent to the European Commission in Brussels, and from 1980 to 1984 he was in Paris. After a period in London he was in Ankara as Head of Chancery from 1987.

In 1990, he was Deputy Private Secretary to the Prince of Wales, and in 1993 was sent to Washington to serve as a Counsellor. Later postings included Director for the Americas in the Foreign and Commonwealth Office, and Deputy Under Secretary of State.

From 2002 to 2006, Westmacott was HM Ambassador to Turkey.

Formerly HM Ambassador to France since 2007, Westmacott took over as HM Ambassador to the United States in January 2012. In 2015, Westmacott was paid a salary of between £170,000 and £174,999 by the Foreign Office, making him one of the 328 most highly paid people in the British public sector at that time.

== Personal life ==
Westmacott was educated at Taunton School before going to New College, Oxford. In 1972, Westmacott married Angela Lugg, with whom he had two sons and a daughter. In 2001, he married an American, Susan Nemazee.

Westmacott's father was Ian Westmacott, a clergyman, and his mother was named Rosemary (née Watney). His cousin, Captain Herbert Westmacott MC, was killed during a gunfight with the Provisional Irish Republican Army in Belfast in 1980.

== Honours and awards ==
- Knight Grand Cross of the Order of St Michael and St George (GCMG) – 2016
- Lieutenant of the Royal Victorian Order (LVO) – 1993
- Commandeur, Legion of Honour – 2008

In March 1993 Westmacott was appointed a Lieutenant of the Royal Victorian Order. He was later appointed a Companion of the Order of St Michael and St George in the 2000 New Year Honours before being promoted to Knight Commander (KCMG) in the 2003 Birthday Honours and Knight Grand Cross (GCMG) in the 2016 Birthday Honours for services to diplomacy.

Diplomatic posts
Preceded by Sir David Logan	British Ambassador to Turkey; 2002–2006	Succeeded by Nick Baird
Preceded by Sir John Holmes	Ambassador of the United Kingdom to France; 2007–2012	Succeeded by Sir Peter Ricketts
Preceded by Sir Nigel Sheinwald	British Ambassador to the United States; 2012–2016	Succeeded by Sir Kim Darroch
