= Hôtel de Charost =

Official residence of the British Ambassador to France in Paris

Coordinates: 48°52′8.97″N 2°19′7.90″E

- The Official Residence of His Britannic Majesty's Ambassador to France
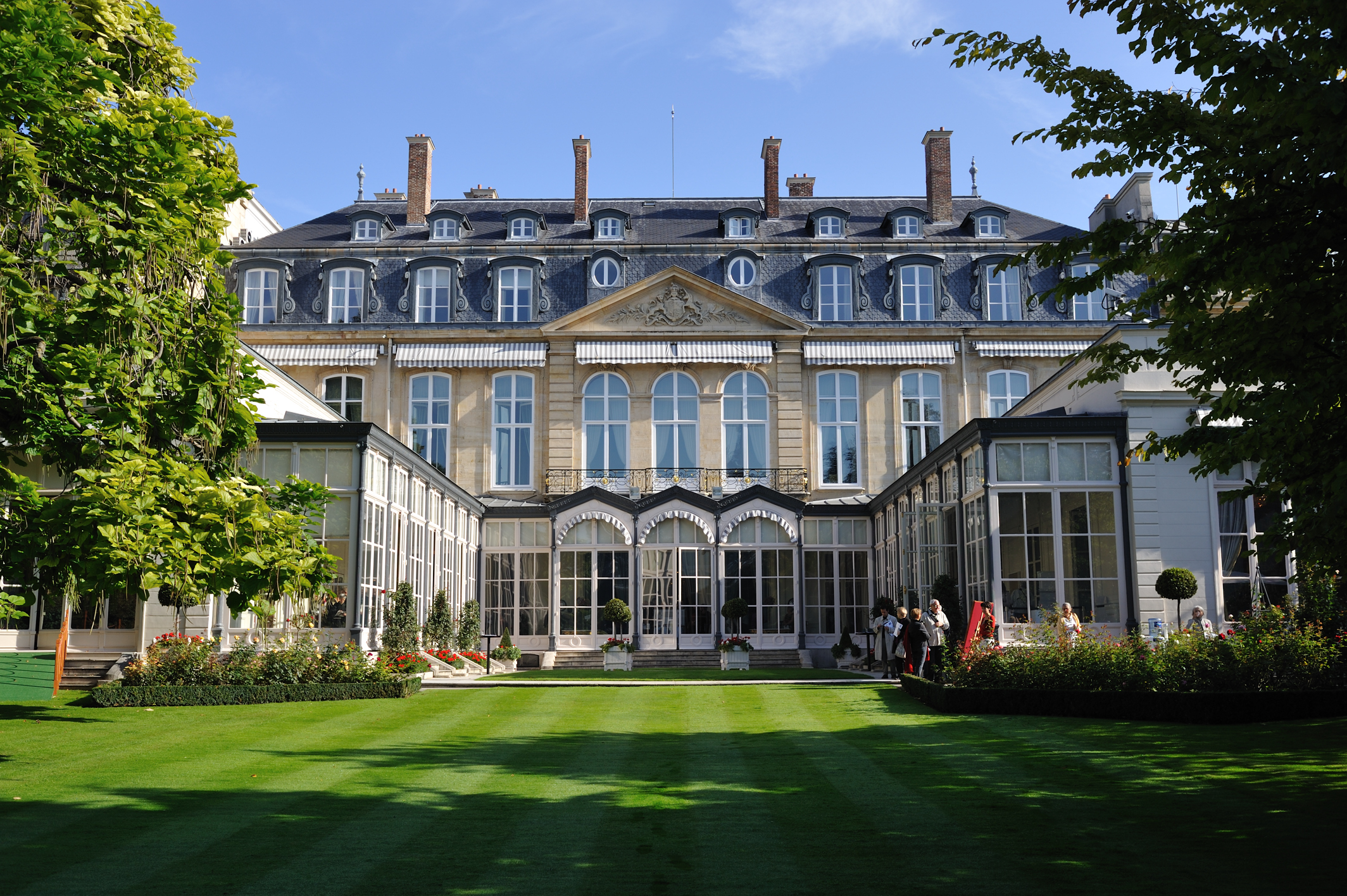
- The Hôtel de Charost seen from the gardens
- Interactive map of the Hôtel de Charost area

General information
- Location: Paris, France, 39, Rue du Faubourg Saint-Honoré; 75008 Paris, France
- Construction started: 1720
- Completed: 1722
- Client: (France) Armand de Bethune, 2nd Duke of Charost and governor of Louis XV
- Owner: (United Kingdom) His Majesty's Diplomatic Service

Technical details
- Floor count: 4

Design and construction
- Architect: fr:Antoine Mazin

The Hôtel de Charost (French pronunciation: [otɛl d(ə) ʃaʁo]) is an hôtel particulier located at 39 Rue du Faubourg Saint-Honoré in Paris. Since 1814, it has been the official residence of the ambassador of the United Kingdom to France. It is located near the Élysée Palace, the official residence of the President of France.

== History ==
Work began on the hôtel in 1722. The property was purchased by the Duke of Charost, a senior courtier of Louis XV. It was designed by Antoine Mazin, the king's own architect. The building was sited on the rue du Faubourg Saint-Honoré, which was then a winding road that passed through fields and market gardens to the village of Roule on the outskirts of Paris. In 1785, the duc of that time rented the hôtel to the Comte de la Marck, a rich landowner from the Low Counties, who saw to the completion of much of the house's eighteenth-century interior decor. The comte also planted what has always been known as the "English Garden."

After it had been an aristocratic home, the hôtel became the Embassy of Portugal, offices for the French home office (siège de bureaux), an Imperial Palace, and the temporary residence of the Austrian ambassador.

In 1803, it was bought by Pauline Borghese, the sister of Napoleon Bonaparte. Napoleon paid 300,000 francs of the 400,000 francs purchase price, and Borghese borrowed the rest from her brother and sister. Borghese added two large wings to the south side of the house, facing the garden. The west wing was built to house Borghese's collection of art, while the east wing became the state dining room.

In 1814, the British government instructed the Duke of Wellington to find a permanent site for the British embassy. The government purchased the hôtel and its contents, sans the Borghese paintings, from Borghese and paid her in instalments of Louis d'or for the equivalent of 275,000 pounds. Borghese passed the gold onto Napoleon, who had been exiled to Elba following the Treaty of Fontainebleau. His dramatic return that climaxed the next year at Waterloo was partly financed with the sale of this house to the British.

Although the Duke of Wellington was Ambassador for only five months in 1814, he entertained lavishly, buying new silver and Sèvres china for the house.

== Gallery ==
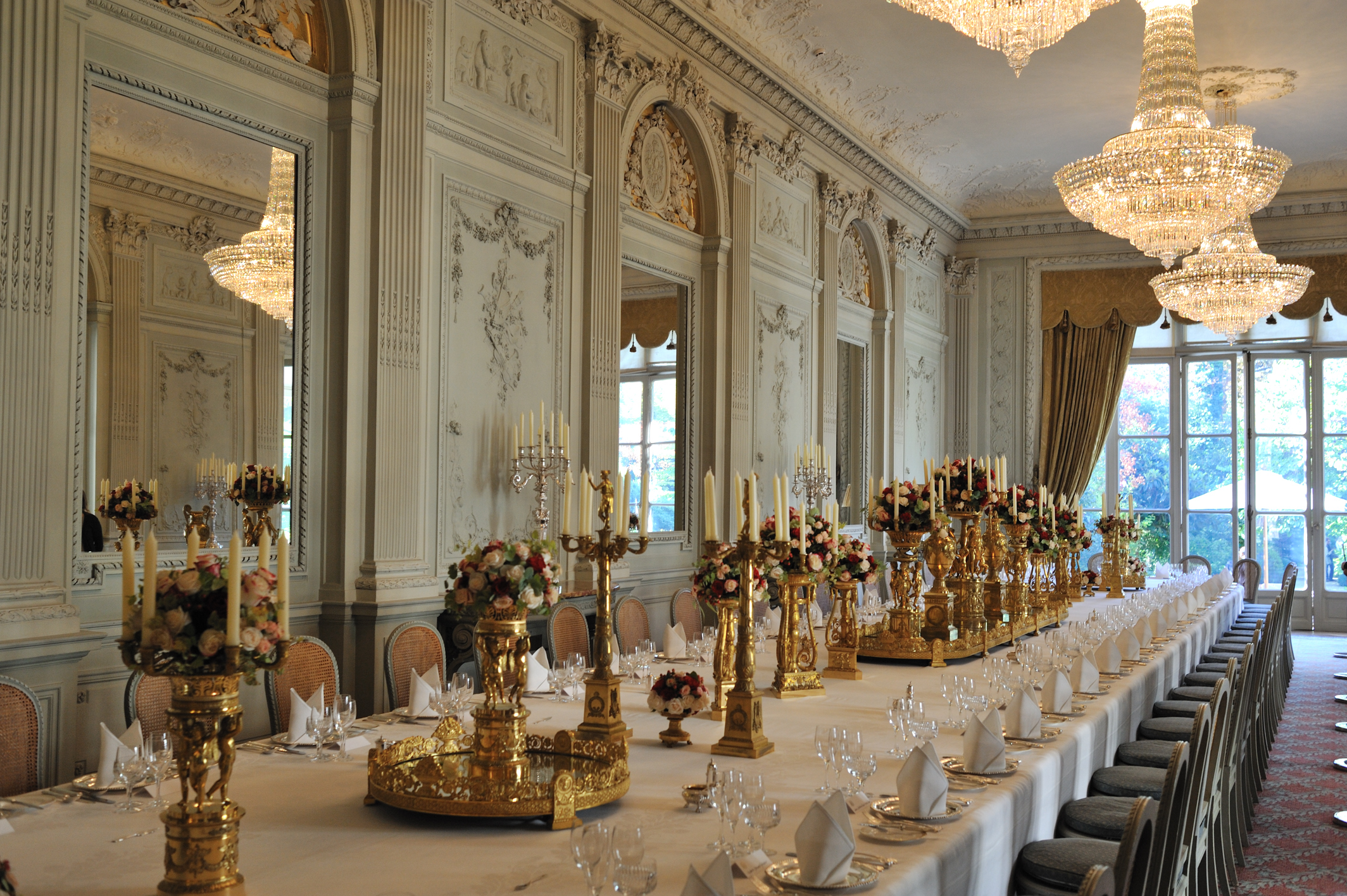
Dining Room

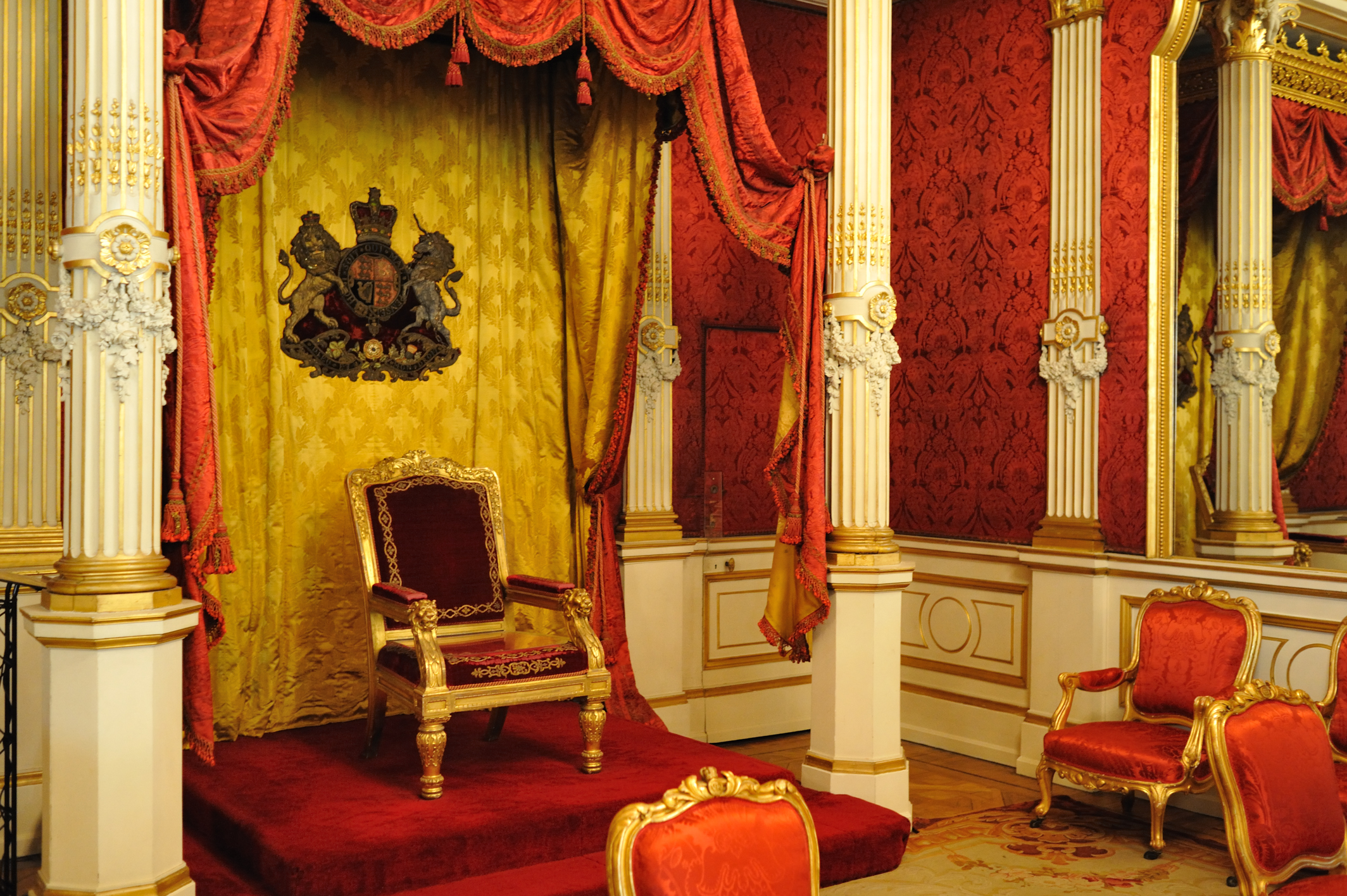
Throne Room

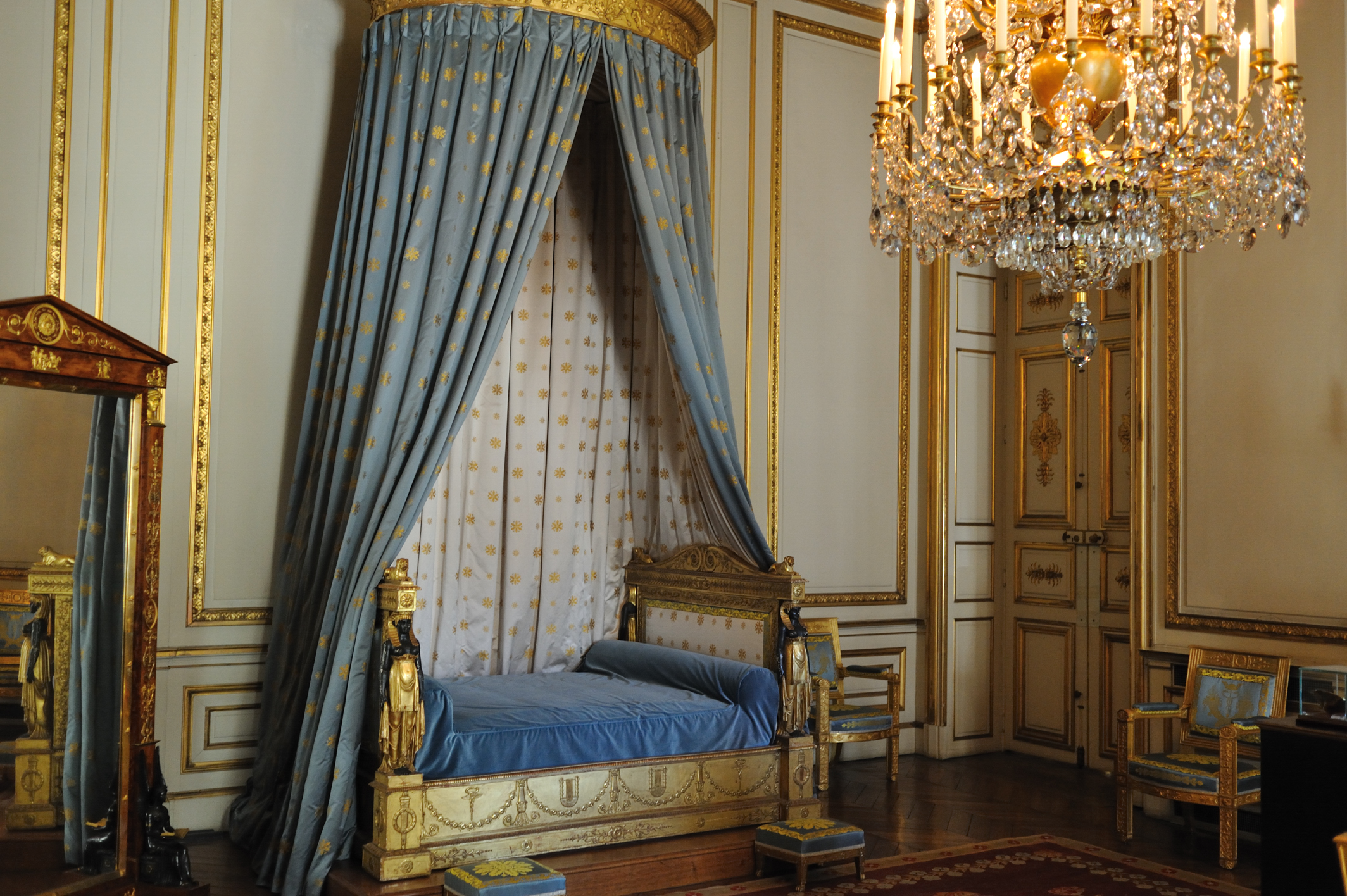
Salon Pauline

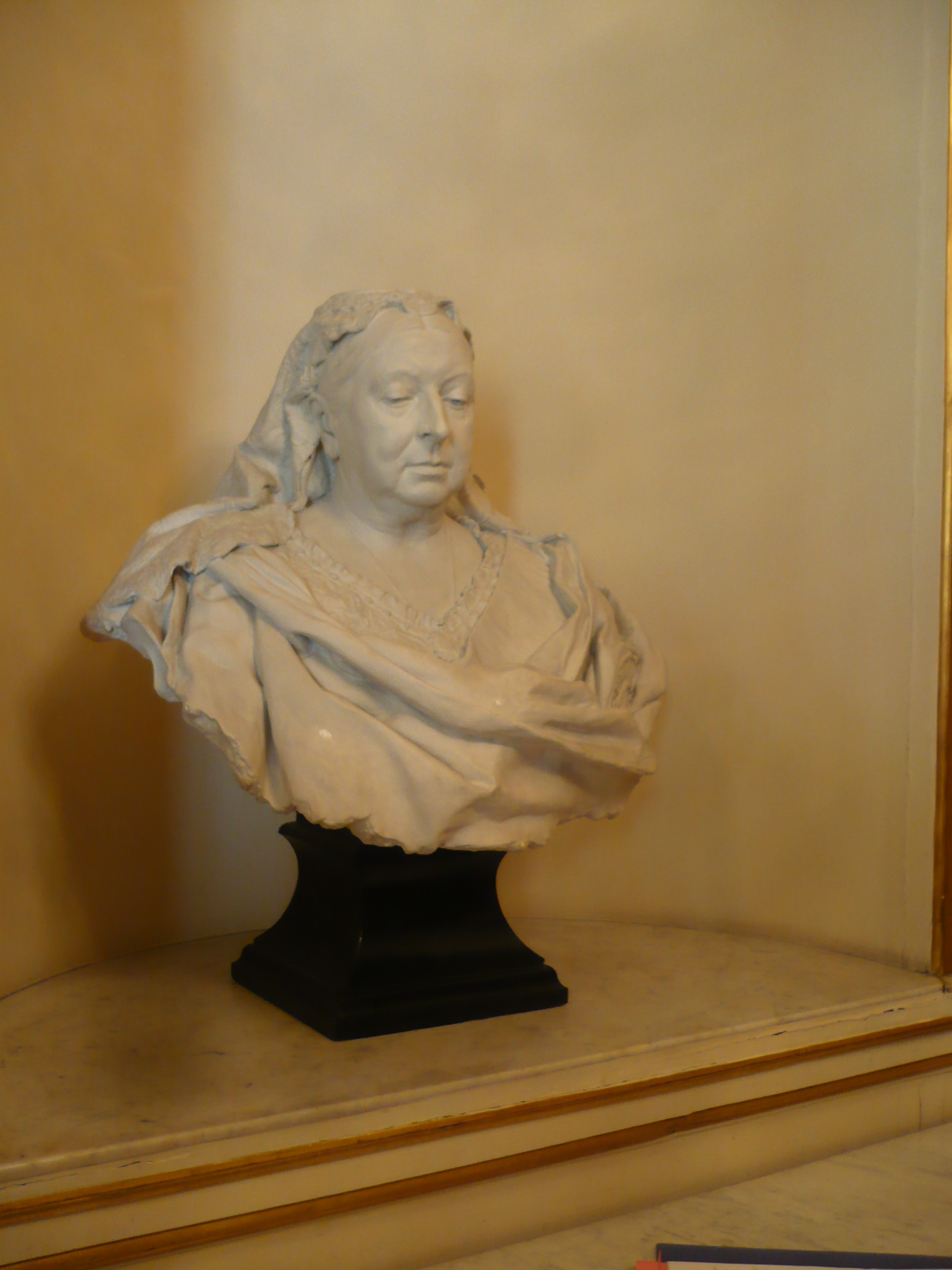
Bust of Queen Victoria in the Throne Room
