= List of ambassadors of the United Kingdom to Somalia =

The ambassador of the United Kingdom to Somalia is the United Kingdom's foremost diplomatic representative to the Federal Republic of Somalia.

On 25 April 2013, Britain re-opened its embassy in Mogadishu, the capital of Somalia, with British First Secretary of State William Hague attending the opening ceremony. On 6 June 2013, the British authorities appointed Neil Wigan as the new British Ambassador to Somalia, succeeding Matt Baugh.

== Ambassadors ==
- 1960–1961: Thomas Bromley
- 1961–1963: Lancelot Pyman
- 1963–1968: Diplomatic relations broken over the Northern Frontier District
- 1968–1970: Stephen Whitwell
- 1970–1973: James Bourn
- 1973–1976: John Shaw
- 1977–1980: Henry Brind
- 1980–1983: Michael Purcell
- 1983–1987: William Fullerton
- 1987–1989: Jeremy Varcoe
- 1989–1990: Ian McCluney
- 1991–2012: British Embassy in Mogadishu evacuated 6 January 1991 after collapse of Siad Barre administration and start of the civil war; relations maintained through the UK diplomatic office in Nairobi
- 2012–2013: Matt Baugh
- 2013–2015: Neil Wigan
- 2015–2016: Harriet Mathews
- 2017–2019: David Concar
- 2019–2021: Ben Fender
- 2021–2023: Kate Foster
- 2023-2025: Michael Nithavrianakis
- 2025–present: Charles King
