= Neil Wigan =

British diplomat

His Excellency Neil Wigan CVO OBE
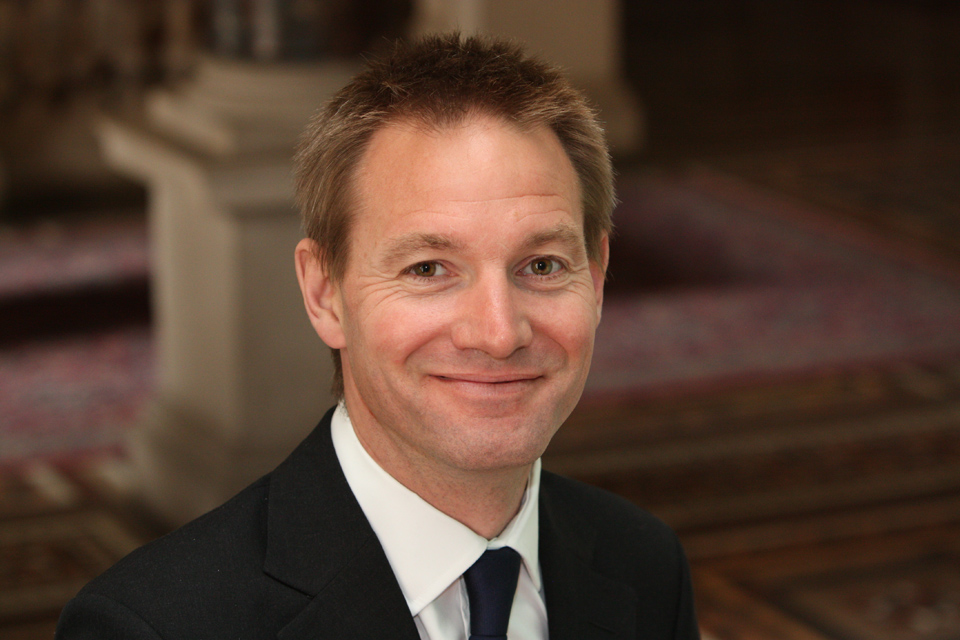

British High Commissioner to Kenya
- In office 16 August 2023 – 31 August 2025
- Monarch: Charles III
- Prime Minister: Rishi Sunak; Keir Starmer
- Preceded by: Jane Marriott
- Succeeded by: Matt Baugh

British Ambassador to Israel
- In office 13 June 2019 – 16 August 2023
- Monarchs: Elizabeth II; Charles III
- Prime Minister: Theresa May; Boris Johnson; Liz Truss; Rishi Sunak
- Preceded by: David Quarrey
- Succeeded by: Simon Walters

British Ambassador to the Democratic Republic of Congo
- In office 2010–2013
- Monarch: Elizabeth II
- Prime Minister: David Cameron
- Preceded by: Nicholas Kay
- Succeeded by: Diane Corner

Personal details
- Children: 2
- Education: University of Oxford; University of London; Johns Hopkins University
- Occupation: Diplomat

Desmond Patrick Neil Wigan CVO OBE is a British diplomat who served as British High Commissioner to Kenya from 2023 to 2025. He previously served as the UK Ambassador to Somalia from 2013 to 2015. He also served as the British ambassador to Israel, June 2019 to June 2023, replacing David Quarrey. In June 2023, he was appointed the British High Commissioner to Kenya, replacing Jane Marriott, who was appointed as British High Commissioner to Pakistan. He left his post in 2025 to become Director General Strategy and Delivery at the UK’s Foreign, Commonwealth and Development Office (FCDO).

== Personal life ==
Wigan studied at the University of Oxford, where he earned a Bachelor of Arts in history. He also has an MSc in economics from the University of London and a Post-Graduate Diploma from the School of Advanced International Studies at Johns Hopkins University.

Wigan is married, and has two children. His wife, Yael, is Israeli, and he can speak basic Hebrew, which he learned from his wife and from watching Israeli shows on Netflix.

== Career ==
Wigan joined the London-based Foreign and Commonwealth Office in 2000. He initially was an Advisor in charge of UK's Economic Policies in the European Union, a position he held for two years. From August 2002 to January 2006, he was the Head of the Political Section at the British Embassy in Tel Aviv, Israel. Wigan subsequently acted as the Head of the Middle East and North Africa Group in London between February 2006 and April 2008. He later was the deputy director for Wider World in the Cabinet Office's Foreign and Defence Policy Secretariat. In March 2010, he was also named as the UK Ambassador to the Democratic Republic of Congo.

In June 2013, Wigan was appointed as the UK Ambassador to Somalia, based at the British Embassy in Mogadishu. On 16 March 2015, Harriet Mathews was appointed as Wigan's successor as Ambassador; Wigan was to be transferred to another Diplomatic Service appointment.

From November 2015 to September 2018, Wigan served as Director for Africa at the Foreign and Commonwealth Office.

Wigan was appointed Officer of the Order of the British Empire (OBE) in the 2016 New Year Honours.

Wigan became Britain's ambassador to Israel in June 2019.

In April 2023, he was appointed as the UK High Commissioner to Kenya, replacing Jane Marriott. He took up the position in August 2023.

He was appointed a Commander of the Royal Victorian Order (CVO) on 3 November 2023 in connection to Their Majesties' State Visit to Kenya.
