= Embassy of the United Kingdom, Mogadishu =

British Embassy, Mogadishu
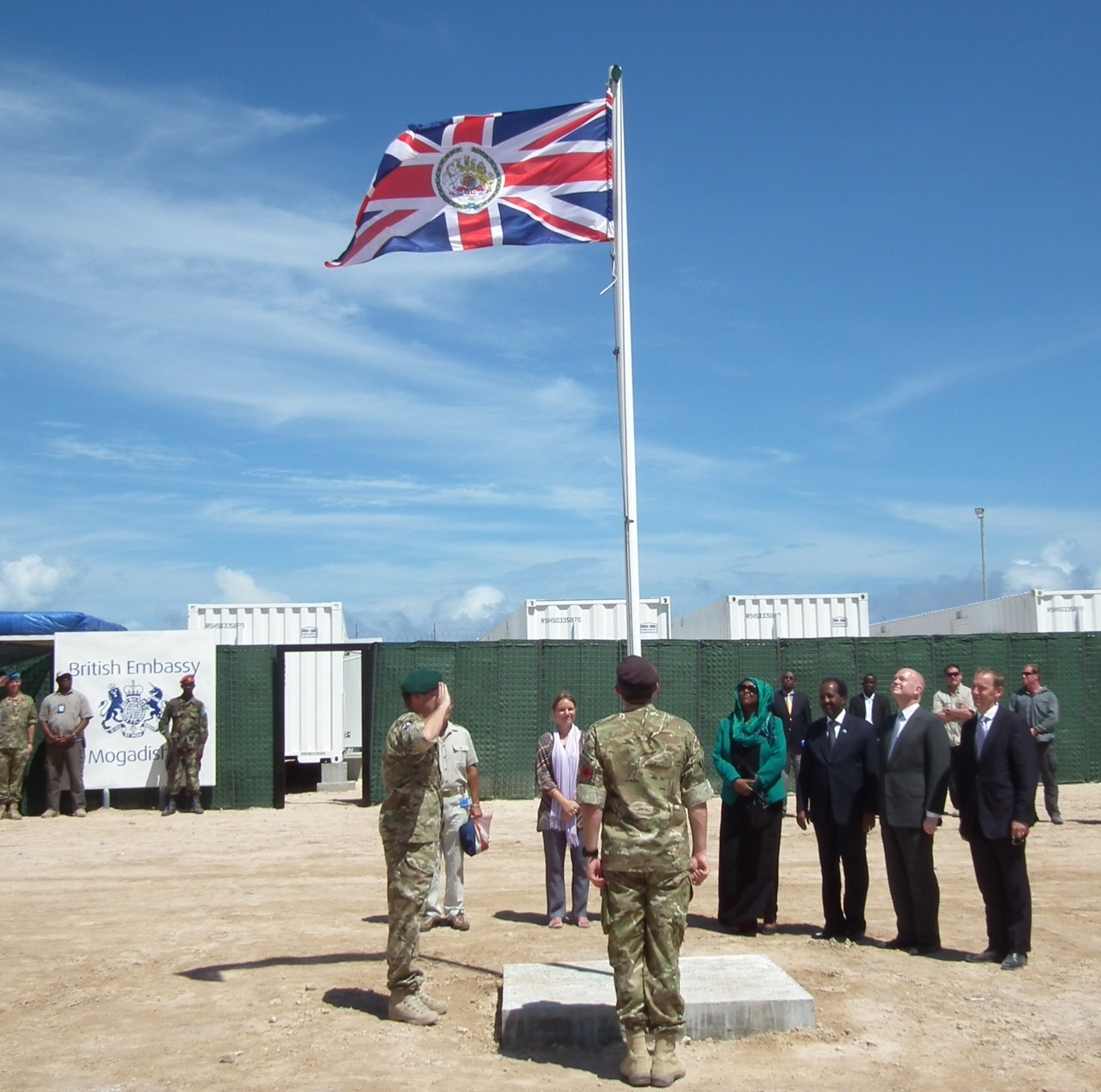
- Opening of the new British Embassy, 2013
- Location: Mogadishu, Somalia
- Coordinates: 2.0299°N 45.3364°E
- Ambassador: Charles King
- Website: www.gov.uk/government/world/organisations/british-embassy-mogadishu

The Embassy of the United Kingdom in Mogadishu is the diplomatic mission of the United Kingdom in Somalia.

== History ==
Following Somalia's independence in 1960, Britain maintained an embassy in the national capital Mogadishu. The embassy later closed down in January 1991, after the start of the civil war. In the ensuing period, the British government maintained relations in absentia with the Transitional National Government and its successor the Transitional Federal Government. After the establishment of the Federal Government of Somalia in August 2012, the British authorities re-affirmed the UK's continued support for Somalia's government, its territorial integrity and sovereignty.

On 25 April 2013, the UK became the first European Union member state to re-open its embassy in the country since the establishment of the Federal Government of Somalia. British Foreign Secretary William Hague attended the opening ceremony in Mogadishu. The compound is situated near the Aden Adde International Airport. Hague described the new embassy as a symbol of the close ties between the British and Somali governments, through which the administrations would work on bilateral security, peacebuilding and statebuilding.

Kate Foster was the ambassador based in Mogadishu from 2021 to 2023 but there were no consular services. British nationals who needed this type of support in either Somalia or Somaliland were instructed to contact the British High Commission in Nairobi. Michael Nithavrianakis was Ambassador from 2023 to 2025.

== See also ==
- Diplomatic missions of the United Kingdom
- List of Ambassadors of the United Kingdom to Somalia
- Somalia–United Kingdom relations
