= William Fullerton (diplomat) =

British diplomat

William Hugh Fullerton CMG (born 11 February 1939) is a British retired diplomat

Fullerton studied Oriental Languages at Queens' College, Cambridge. He worked for Shell International Petroleum in Uganda from 1963 to 1965, leaving to join the Foreign Office. He attended a course at MECAS (1965-1966) and then served as Information Officer in Jedda (1966-1967).

After spells in Jamaica and Turkey Fullerton was Consul-General in Islamabad (1981-1983); Ambassador to Somalia (1983-1987); Governor of the Falkland Islands (1988-1992); and finally British Ambassador to Kuwait (1992-1996).

Diplomatic posts
Preceded by Michael Purcell	British Ambassador to Somalia; 1983-1987	Succeeded by Jeremy Varcoe
Preceded by Michael Weston	British Ambassador to Kuwait; 1992-1996	Succeeded by Graham Boyce

== Honours ==
- Companion of the Order of St Michael and St George (CMG) - 1989
