= Alex Younger =

British intelligence officer (1963–2026)

Sir Alex Younger KCMG
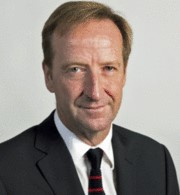
- Younger in 2014

16th Chief of the Secret Intelligence Service
- In office 1 November 2014 – 30 September 2020
- Prime Minister: David Cameron; Theresa May; Boris Johnson
- Preceded by: Sir John Sawers
- Succeeded by: Sir Richard Moore

Personal details
- Born: Alexander William Younger; 4 July 1963 Westminster, London, England
- Died: 2 June 2026 (aged 62) Boston, United States
- Spouse: Sarah Hopkins (m. 1993)
- Children: 3
- Education: University of St Andrews
- Occupation: Intelligence officer
- Awards: Knight Commander of the Order of St Michael and St George

Military service
- Allegiance: United Kingdom
- Branch/service: British Army
- Years of service: 1986–1990
- Rank: Captain
- Unit: Royal Scots; Scots Guards

Sir Alexander William Younger KCMG (4 July 1963 – 2 June 2026) was a British intelligence officer who served as the Chief of the Secret Intelligence Service (MI6) from 2014 to 2020. In April 2019, the government extended his contract to maintain stability through the Brexit negotiations, making him the longest-serving MI6 chief in 50 years.

== Early life and education ==
Younger was born in Westminster, London, on 4 July 1963 to Nicholas and Mary (née Edge) Younger, who were of Scottish heritage. He was educated at Marlborough College before graduating from the University of St Andrews with a degree in economics and computer science.

== Career ==
=== Military service ===
Younger was sponsored by the British Army through university. He was commissioned into the Royal Scots on 5 September 1986 as a second lieutenant (on probation). As a university candidate he was a full-time student at university and trained in his spare time. On 10 December 1986, he transferred to the Scots Guards.

On 16 June 1987, his commission was confirmed and dated to 5 September 1986; this signified the start of his full-time military service. He was granted seniority in the rank of second lieutenant from 9 April 1983. He was promoted to lieutenant, which was backdated to 5 September 1986, and was granted seniority from 9 April 1985. He was promoted to captain on 5 April 1989. On 10 April 1990, he transferred to the Regular Army Reserve of Officers, thereby ending his active military service.

=== Intelligence work ===
Younger joined MI6 in 1991. He joined the service at the same time as Richard Tomlinson, who in his book The Big Breach, portrayed him as "Spencer", a St Andrews graduate and former Scots Guardsman who was recruited while working for the Halo Trust in Afghanistan.

Younger served in the Balkans during the Yugoslav Wars, Vienna, Dubai and in Afghanistan overseeing all SIS operations in country. Returning to the UK he became Head of Counter-Terrorism in 2009, in which role he was involved in security for the London Olympics 2012. He became deputy director in 2012, before being nominated as Chief in October 2014, succeeding Sir John Sawers on his retirement.

In a leaked list of 160 MI6 agents—which was originally believed to have been released by Richard Tomlinson, although government officials later acknowledged that the list did not come from Tomlinson—Younger is mentioned as having been posted to Vienna in 1995. As of 2015, Younger was paid a salary of between £160,000 and £164,999, making him one of the 328 most highly paid people in the British public sector at that time.

=== Private sector ===
In 2025, Younger joined the advisory board of Datenna, a "global provider of techno-economic intelligence on China", based in the Netherlands.

== Public views ==
=== Russia ===
In 2016 Younger said that cyber-attacks, propaganda and subversion from "hostile states" posed a "fundamental threat" to European democracies including the UK. In a rare speech by an MI6 chief while in office, he did not specifically name Russia, but was widely believed to have been referring to it.

In 2020 Younger described continuing Russian ambition to subvert Western democratic process through disinformation, which he ascribed to Russian fear of the quality of Western institutions and alliances. He advocated strong defences but warned that the West should not "magnify the effect of these relatively crude and unsophisticated attacks by exaggerating their effect."

=== The People's Republic of China and technology ===
In December 2018, Younger raised concerns about Huawei's role in the UK's new 5G mobile network. In 2020 he forecast continuing ideological divergence between the West and the PRC given the premium that the Chinese Communist Party placed in preserving their interests. He said that this would have significant security consequences that the West should anticipate and organise against. But it should also recognise the need for coexistence given that two value systems were likely to occupy one planet for the foreseeable future. He also called for the West to refocus on its own strengths: the quality of its alliances and innovation, rather than simply lamenting the rise of a competitor.

=== Human rights ===
In an October 2020 interview with Angelina Jolie in Time magazine, Younger voiced fears that the international consensus on human rights norms had broken down. Separately, he acknowledged that Afghanistan's future had to be determined by politics but warned that the country had changed and that the Taliban should understand that Afghans, particularly women, would have no tolerance for a reversion to the way things were.

=== Academic freedom ===
In December 2018 Younger gave a rare speech at the University of St Andrews, emphasising the need for fourth-generation espionage and fusing human skills with technical innovation. This was his second public speech in the four years since his appointment as chief of MI6. During the speech Younger addressed the case of Matthew Hedges, a British university student who was arrested in the UAE. Younger said he was "perplexed" by what has happened and that there were some "frank conversations ahead" between Britain and the UAE. Hedges was later pardoned by UAE President Khalifa bin Zayed Al Nahyan and reunited with his wife in the UK.

=== Counter terrorism ===
On 16 February 2019, when interviewed by the British press, Younger was asked about the wives of British ISIS fighters stuck in Syria after the fall of the caliphate. He acknowledged their plight, but warned that such people would have acquired skills and connections that made them dangerous to the public. Home Secretary Sajid Javid later chose to strip Shamima Begum, who had married an ISIS fighter, of her British citizenship. The decision was confirmed in the case of Begum v Home Secretary.

In September 2020, while speaking to the Financial Times, Younger was asked if the UK had wrongly prioritised counter terrorism at the expense of coverage of Russia and the PRC. Younger said that he supported the government's very low tolerance for instability driven by terrorism because it was such a gross violation of social norms. He described the recent destruction of the ISIS caliphate in Syria as a "high point", but warned that terrorism had now become more autonomous and spontaneous, and remained lethal.

=== UK politics ===
In a July 2024 interview with ITV News, Younger said Britain had become "irrelevant" since Brexit.

== Personal life and death ==
Younger married Sarah Hopkins, daughter of architects Michael and Patty Hopkins, in Borgo a Mozzano, Tuscany, in 1993. They had three children, a daughter and two sons. On 30 March 2019, Younger's middle child, Sam, was killed in a motoring accident in Stirlingshire.

Younger died from pancreatic cancer on 2 June 2026, aged 62. He had been diagnosed with cancer the previous year.

== Honours ==
Younger was appointed Companion of the Order of St Michael and St George (CMG) in the 2011 Birthday Honours and Knight Commander of the Order of St Michael and St George (KCMG) in the 2019 Birthday Honours for services to the United Kingdom.

== See also ==
- Charles Cumming
- Mansfield Cumming
- William Melville
- Sidney Reilly

Government offices
| Preceded by Sir John Sawers | Chief of the Secret Intelligence Service; November 2014 – October 2020 | Succeeded by Richard Moore |
