= David Quarrey =

British diplomat (born 1966)

His Excellency Sir David Quarrey KCMG
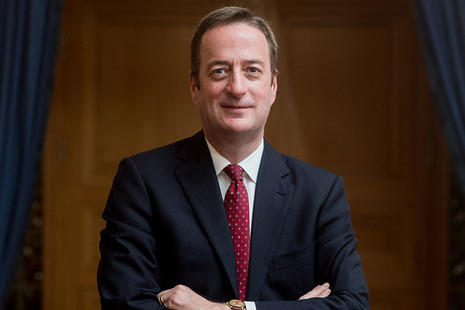

Permanent Representative of the United Kingdom to NATO
- In office April 2022 – April 2025
- Monarchs: Elizabeth II; Charles III
- Prime Minister: Boris Johnson; Liz Truss; Rishi Sunak; Keir Starmer
- Preceded by: Dame Sarah MacIntosh
- Succeeded by: Angus Lapsley

Deputy National Security Adviser and Prime Minister’s Adviser on International Affairs
- In office July 2019 – April 2022
- Prime Minister: Boris Johnson
- Preceded by: Christian Turner
- Succeeded by: Dame Sarah MacIntosh (Deputy National Security Adviser and Prime Minister’s Adviser on Foreign Affairs)

United Kingdom National Security Adviser
- Acting; 17 September 2020 – 23 March 2021
- Prime Minister: Boris Johnson
- Preceded by: Sir Mark Sedwill
- Succeeded by: Sir Stephen Lovegrove

British Ambassador to Israel
- In office 2015–2019
- Prime Minister: David Cameron; Theresa May
- Preceded by: Matthew Gould
- Succeeded by: Neil Wigan

Personal details
- Spouse: Aldo Oliver Henriquez

Sir David Quarrey KCMG (born 1966) is a British diplomat who served as British Ambassador to NATO from 2022 to 2025. He was formerly acting National Security Adviser, having taken over the role while David Frost continued as the United Kingdom's Chief Negotiator to the European Union during the Brexit negotiations. He was the UK's Ambassador to Israel from 2015 to 2019.

== Career ==
Quarrey, who joined the Foreign and Commonwealth Office in 1994, previously directed its Near East and North Africa Department. He has also served as a British diplomat in Harare, in Delhi and at the United Nations in New York. When Tony Blair was British prime minister, he was his private secretary for two years.

Quarrey's term as Ambassador to Israel ended in June 2019. He was replaced by Neil Wigan.

Quarrey was previously Prime Minister Boris Johnson's International Affairs Adviser and Deputy National Security Adviser. In April 2022 he was appointed as the British Ambassador to NATO.

== Personal life ==
Quarrey was Britain's first openly homosexual Ambassador to Israel. His husband is Aldo Oliver Henriquez.

In 2021, he tested positive for the Indian variant of COVID-19 after returning from a government business trip to India.

Diplomatic posts
Preceded by Matthew Gould	British Ambassador to Israel; 2015–2019	Succeeded by Neil Wigan
Government offices
Preceded by Lord Sedwill	Acting National Security Adviser; 2020–2021	Succeeded by Sir Stephen Lovegrove
