= Michael Willcocks =

British Army general (born 1944)

Lieutenant General Sir Michael Willcocks KCB CVO
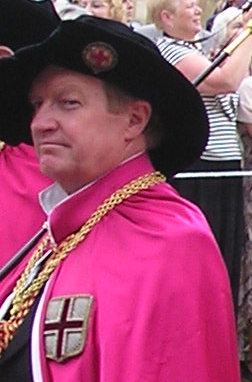
- Willcocks in 2006 in his Order of the Bath robes

Gentleman Usher of the Black Rod
- In office 9 May 2001 – 30 April 2009
- Monarch: Elizabeth II
- Preceded by: Sir Edward Jones
- Succeeded by: Sir Freddie Viggers

Personal details
- Born: 27 July 1944 (age 82)

Military service
- Allegiance: United Kingdom
- Branch/service: British Army
- Years of service: 1964–2001
- Rank: Lieutenant General
- Commands: 1st Regiment Royal Horse Artillery
- Battles/wars: Indonesia–Malaysia confrontation The Troubles; Gulf War; Bosnian War
- Awards: Knight Commander of the Order of the Bath; Commander of the Royal Victorian Order

Sir Michael Alan Willcocks, KCB, CVO (born 27 July 1944) is a retired officer of the British Army and former Gentleman Usher of the Black Rod for the Parliament of the United Kingdom's House of Lords.

== Military career ==
Willcocks was commissioned into the Royal Regiment of Artillery in 1964. He was appointed commanding officer of 1st Regiment Royal Horse Artillery in 1983.

Willcocks became Deputy Assistant Chief of Staff at Headquarters UK Land Forces in 1985, Assistant Chief of Staff for Intelligence/Operations at Headquarters UK Land Forces in 1988 and Commander Royal Artillery for the 4th Armoured Division in 1989. He went on to be Assistant Chief of Staff for Land Operations at the Joint War Headquarters for the Gulf War in 1991, Director of Army Plans and Programme at the Ministry of Defence in 1991 and Director-General Land Warfare at the Ministry of Defence in 1993.

Willcocks was then appointed Chief of Staff for the Allied Command Europe Rapid Reaction Corps in 1994, Chief of Staff for the Land Component of the Peace Implementation Force (IFOR) in Bosnia and Herzegovina in 1995 and Assistant Chief of the General Staff in 1996. His last appointments were as Deputy Commander (Operations) for the Stabilization Force (SFOR) in Bosnia and Herzegovina from 1999 and as UK military representative to NATO and the European Union from 2000 until his retirement in 2001.

== Black Rod ==
Willcocks was appointed Gentleman Usher of the Black Rod on 9 May 2001. After seven years in this post, he announced in late 2008 that he was stepping down from the role, and relinquished the post on 29 April 2009.

At Willcocks' first State Opening of Parliament, Dennis Skinner, MP, famous for interrupting Black Rod, said "You're nowt but a midget!" At Willcocks' last State Opening, Skinner asked, "any Tory moles at the Palace?", referring to the controversial then-recent arrest of Conservative MP Damian Green in connection with an investigation about receiving confidential information from a civil servant at the Home Office who had been a former Conservative Party candidate. In a mild, but highly memorable breach of protocol, Willcocks responded (interruptions are supposed to be ignored) "I shall miss you, Dennis", receiving laughter from other MPs. As Black Rod, Willcocks oversaw the Queen Mother's lying-in-state at Westminster Hall.

Willcocks was appointed a Knight Commander of the Order of the Bath in the 2000 New Year Honours. The Queen invested him with the insignia of a Commander of the Royal Victorian Order on his retirement as Black Rod on 29 April 2009. He is also a Knight Commander of Merit with Star of the Sacred Military Constantinian Order of St George.

== Other roles ==
Willcocks is also the current Charter Commissioner for the Press Complaints Commission.

Military offices
Preceded by Timothy Granville-Chapman	Assistant Chief of the General Staff; 1996–1999	Succeeded by Kevin O'Donoghue
Preceded by Sir Paul Haddacks	UK Military Representative to NATO; 2000–2001	Succeeded by Sir Kevin O'Donoghue
Government offices
Preceded by Sir Edward Jones	Black Rod; 2001–2009	Succeeded by Sir Freddie Viggers
