= Philip Boyce (psychiatrist) =

Australian psychiatrist (born 1949)

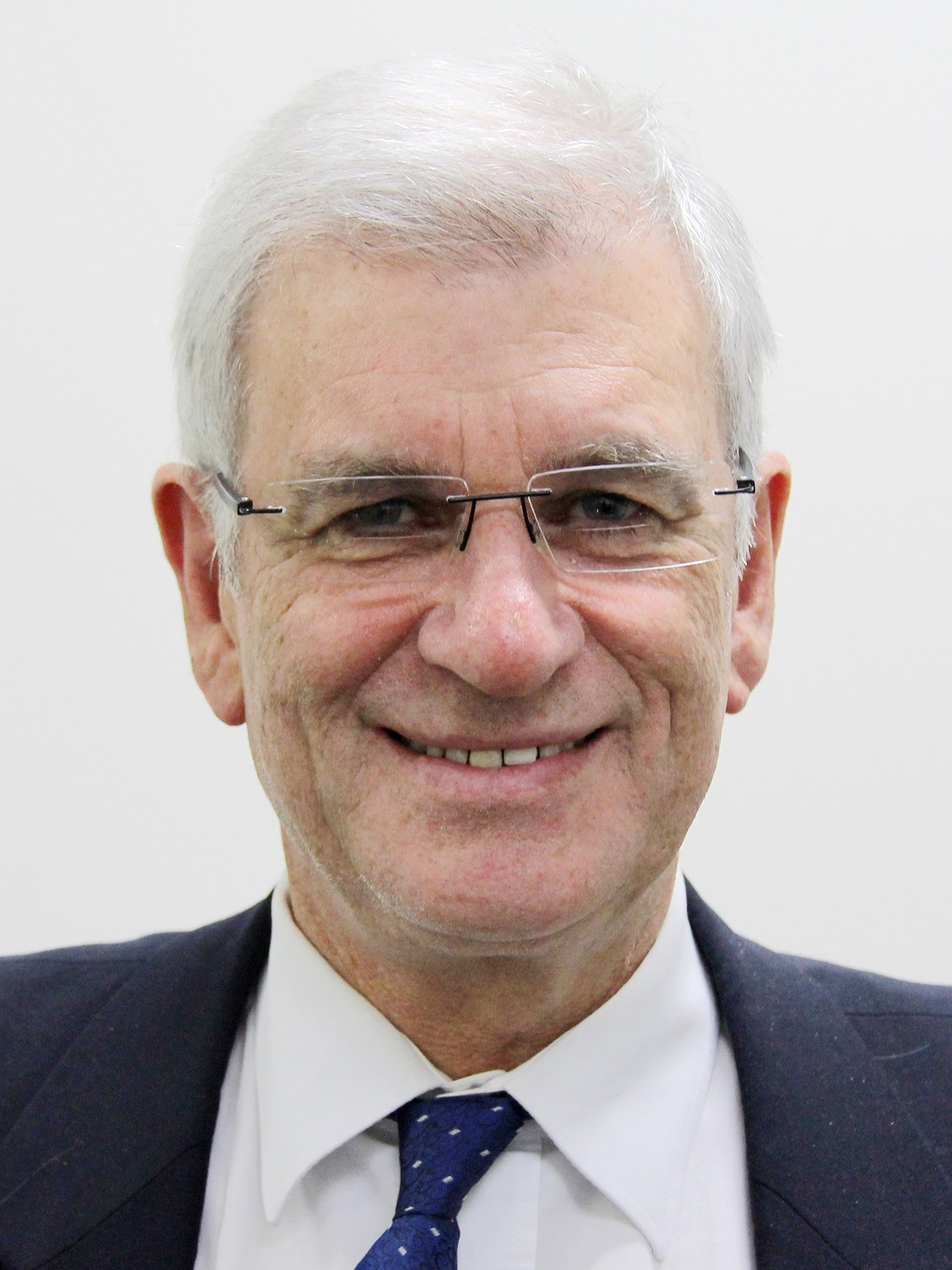
Philip Manley Boyce

Philip Manley Boyce AM (born 20 September 1949) is an Australian psychiatrist. He is an Emeritus Professor of Psychiatry at the University of Sydney and an Emeritus Consultant in Psychiatry at Westmead Hospital. He was a professor of psychiatry and head of discipline of psychiatry at the University of Sydney, and head of Perinatal Psychiatry Clinical Research Unit at Westmead Hospital. He has published more than 350 articles, and frequently contributes to psychiatric textbooks. He served as associate editor of Australian and New Zealand Journal of Psychiatry. He has a long clinical and research interest in anxiety disorders, mood disorders, psychosomatic disorders, and perinatal psychiatry. He has also taken leadership roles in the profession as president of the RANZCP and the international Marcé society, in the development of clinical practice guidelines, and in the development of a competency-based training program for the college.

== Early life and education ==
Philip Manley Boyce was born on 20 September 1949 in Edenburg, South Africa, to Madeline Millicent Manley and Hugh Boyce. He has two older brothers – Lord Boyce and Sir Graham Boyce. Boyce studied at Guy's Hospital Medical School from 1968 to 1973. He earned a Diploma of Psychotherapy from the University of Adelaide in 1980, and a Doctor of Medicine from the University of New South Wales in 1990.

== Marriage and children ==
He met his future wife Jacqueline Wilkes (deceased 2013) in England; they emigrated to Australia, where they married in 1976. He lives with the journalist and writer Nikki Barrowclough.

== Career ==
Boyce worked at the Parramatta Psychiatric Centre in Richmond from 1977 to 1978. He then moved to Adelaide, where he worked at Hillcrest Hospital as a Consultant Psychiatrist, and in 1980, he became the Director of Affective Disorders Unit, as well as a Clinical Lecturer. In 1984, he moved to Sydney to take up a position at the University of New South Wales as a lecturer in Psychiatry, as well as a consultant at the Prince of Wales and Prince Henry Hospitals. In 1989, Boyce became a senior lecturer at the University of New South Wales, and a Consultant Psychiatrist at the Prince Henry Hospital.

In 1990, Boyce became the Area Director of Mental Health, and an Associate Professor in Psychiatry and a Director of the Mental Health division at the Penrith District Health Service. After becoming the Sub-Dean at the Faculty of Medicine at the University of Sydney Nepean Hospital, Boyce also became the Acting Head of the Department of Psychological Medicine.

Boyce was on eight committees and boards, including the Bipolar Advisory Board and Chair, Standing Committee for the Training of Psychiatrists, NSW Institute of Psychiatry. He was the president of the Royal Australian and New Zealand College of Psychiatrists from 2003 to 2005.

== Award ==
In 2016, the Royal Australian and New Zealand College of Psychiatrists's presented the College Medal of Honour to Philip Boyce for distinguished and meritorious service to the College. Professor Boyce has served both the College and his patients with distinction, earning recognition as a leader and researcher over many years.

He was made a Member of the Order of Australia in the King’s Birthday list in 2023.

== Selected publications ==
=== Books ===
- Boyce, P., Harris, A., Drobny, J., Lampe, L., Starcevic, V., & Bryant, R. (Eds.). (2015). The Sydney Handbook of Anxiety Disorders: A Guide to the Symptoms, Causes and Treatments of Anxiety Disorders. Sydney: The University of Sydney. ISBN 978-0994214508
- Parker, G. & Boyce, P. (2014). Overcoming Baby Blues: A Comprehensive Guide to Perinatal Depression. Allen & Unwin. ISBN 978-1743316771
- Beumont, P., Andrews G., Boyce, P., & Carr, V. (Eds.). (1997). Psychological Medicine A Companion to Management of Mental Disorders. World Health Organization. ISBN 9780958705257

Haddad, M. and Boyce P. (2017) Fast Facts: Depression, Oxford: Health Press. ISBN 978-1-910797-52-5

=== Book chapters ===
- Spratt, C., Boyce, P., Davies, M. (2011). The Australian and New Zealand Experience. In Dinesh Bhugra, Amit Malik (Eds.), Workplace-Based Assessments in Psychiatric Training, (pp. 137–150). Cambridge: Cambridge University Press. ASIN B005253EU6
- Boyce, P., Bell, C. (2005). Two bites of the cherry: One solution. In Carol Henshaw (Eds.), Screening for postnatal depression, (pp. 52–58). United Kingdom: Jessica Kingsley. London.
- Boyce, P., Condon, J. (2004). Mood Disorders in Pregnancy and the Puerperium. In Peter Joyce, Philip Mitchell (Eds.), Mood Disorders: recognition and treatment, (pp. 393–409). Sydney: University of New South Wales (UNSW) Press.
- Boyce, P., Clarke, D., Smith, G. (2001). The Mind Talking Through the Body. In S Bloch and BS Singh (Eds.), Foundations of Clinical Psychiatry (2nd edition), (pp. 194–216). Australia: Melbourne University Press. ISBN 9780522849240

=== Journal articles ===
- Light, E., Robertson, M., Kerridge, I., Boyce, P., Carney, T., Rosen, A., Cleary, M., Hunt, G., O'Connor, N. (2016). Re-conceptualising involuntary outpatient psychiatric treatment: From "capacity" to "capability" (Forthcoming). Philosophy, Psychiatry, & Psychology.
- Malhi, G., Byrow, Y., Bassett, D., Boyce, P., Hopwood, M., Lyndon, W., Mulder, R., Porter, R., Singh, A., Murray, G. (2016). Stimulants for depression: On the up and up? Australian and New Zealand Journal of Psychiatry, 50(3), 203–207.
- Malhi, G., Byrow, Y., Boyce, P., Bassett, D., Fitzgerald, P., Hopwood, M., Lyndon, W., Mulder, R., Murray, G., Singh, A., et al. (2016). Why the hype about subtype? Bipolar I, bipolar II – It's simply bipolar, through and through!. Australian and New Zealand Journal of Psychiatry, 50(4), 303–306.
- Boyce, P. (2015). A young woman with noise intolerance. Medicine Today, 16(7), 46–47.
- Boyce, P. (2015). Are we there yet? Australian and New Zealand Journal of Psychiatry, 49(9), 765–766.
- Bensoussan, A., Kellow, J., Bourchier, S., Fahey, P., Shim, L., Malcolm, A., Boyce, P. (2015). Efficacy of a Chinese Herbal Medicine in Providing Adequate Relief of Constipation-predominant Irritable Bowel Syndrome: A Randomized Controlled Trial. Clinical Gastroenterology and Hepatology, 13(11), 1946–1954.
- Day, C., Rush, A., Harris, A., Boyce, P., Rekshan, W., Etkin, A., DeBattista, C., Schatzberg, A., Arnow, B., Williams, L. (2015). Impairment and distress patterns distinguishing the melancholic depression subtype: An iSPOT-D report. Journal of Affective Disorders, 174, 493–502.
- Boyce, P. (2015). In the mood. Australian and New Zealand Journal of Psychiatry, 49(12), 1081–1082.
- Light, E., Kerridge, I., Robertson, M., Boyce, P., Carney, T., Rosen, A., Cleary, M., Hunt, G., O'Connor, N., Ryan, C. (2015). Involuntary psychiatric treatment in the community: general practitioners and the implementation of community treatment orders. Australian Family Physician, 44(7), 485–489.
- Bergink, V., Boyce, P., Munk-Olsen, T. (2015). Postpartum psychosis: A valuable misnomer. Australian and New Zealand Journal of Psychiatry, 49(2), 102–103.
- Malhi, G., Bassett, D., Boyce, P., Bryant, R., Fitzgerald, P., Fritz, K., Hopwood, M., Lyndon, B., Mulder, R., Murray, G., et al. (2015). Royal Australian and New Zealand College of Psychiatrists clinical practice guidelines for mood disorders. Australian and New Zealand Journal of Psychiatry, 49(12), 1087–1206.
