= Datenna =

Dutch data intelligence company

- Type: Private (B.V.)
- Industry: Data intelligence
- Founded: May 2017; 9 years ago in Eindhoven, Netherlands
- Founders: Jaap van Etten; Edward Brinkmann
- Headquarters: Eindhoven, Netherlands
- Area served: Worldwide
- Key people: Jaap van Etten (CEO); Edward Brinkmann (Chief Innovation Officer); Inge Bryan (Chair)
- Website: datenna.com

Datenna is a Dutch data intelligence company focused on China-related corporate and government data. It is headquartered in Eindhoven, Netherlands.

The company aggregates Chinese-language primary sources — including corporate registries, procurement records, patent filings, and government publications — to map ownership structures and state connections of Chinese entities. Its clients include government agencies, defence organizations, and compliance and corporate users. Datenna also conducts research on European acquisitions by Chinese investors.

== History ==
Datenna was founded in 2017 by Jaap van Etten and Edward Brinkmann. Van Etten had previously worked as a Dutch diplomat, serving as a Science and Technology Attaché at the Dutch embassy in Beijing before launching the company.

Datenna received a soft loan from the Netherlands Enterprise Agency, part of the Dutch government, in 2017.

In 2020, Datenna research showed that the "Chinese government has a stake in 53% of Swiss companies acquired by Chinese firms since 2010." The Ultimate Beneficial Owner (UBO) in the Swiss acquisitions "is either part of the Chinese government, or the Chinese government has a substantial stake in the acquiring company but not a controlling one."

In February 2025, Alex Younger, former Chief of the British Secret Intelligence Service (MI6), joined the company's advisory board.
