= David Hannay, Baron Hannay of Chiswick =

British diplomat

The Right Honourable The Lord Hannay of Chiswick GCMG CH
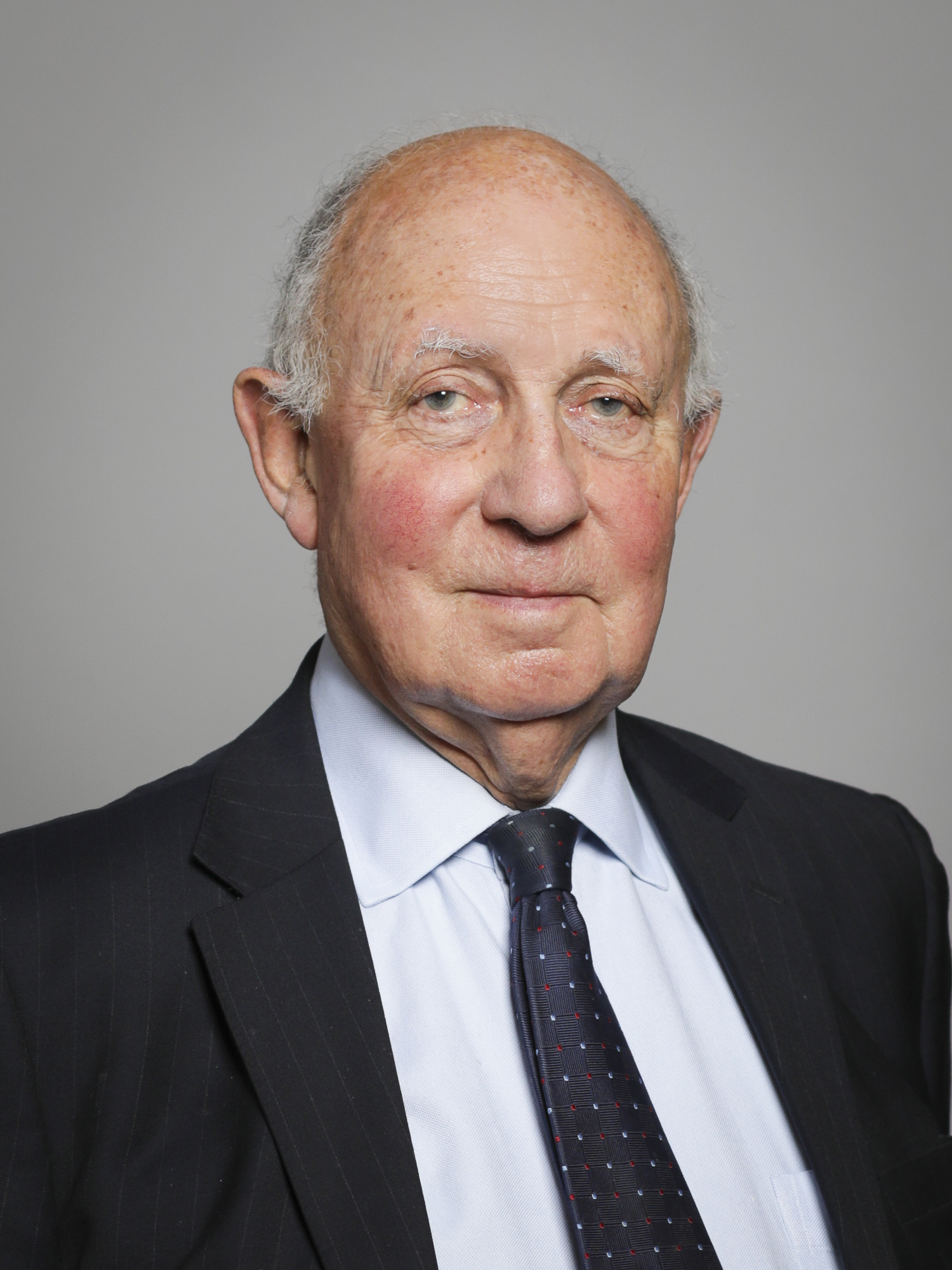

Member of the House of Lords
- Lord Temporal
- Life peerage 19 June 2001

Personal details
- Born: 28 September 1935 (age 91)
- Party: Crossbench

David Hugh Alexander Hannay, Baron Hannay of Chiswick GCMG CH (born 28 September 1935) is a British former diplomat.

== Biography ==
David Hannay was born in London; but spent most of his early years during the Second World War evacuated to Scotland. He was educated at Craigflower Preparatory School, Winchester College and New College, Oxford, where he received a first-class honours degree in modern history.

During his national military service (1954–1956) he served as a second lieutenant in the 8th King’s Royal Irish Hussars, stationed at Luneburg in West Germany.

He entered the Foreign and Commonwealth Office in 1959; he initially studied Persian and was posted to Tehran and to Kabul (1961–1963) where he was Third (Oriental) Secretary at the embassy. On his return to London, he became desk officer for CENTO and Afghanistan in the Eastern Department of the Foreign Office (1963–1965). In 1965, he was posted to the UK Delegation to the European Communities in Brussels and became involved in the UK's second bid to join the European Communities. From 1970 to 1972, he was a member of the Negotiating Team for accession to the European Communities. In 1973, he was seconded to the European Commission where he served as chef de cabinet (Principal Private Secretary) to Sir Christopher Soames, the senior British Commissioner, and responsible for trade policy and external relations (1973–1977).

In 1977, he returned to the Foreign and Commonwealth Office where he served until 1984 as, successively, head of Energy, Science and Space Department; as head of Middle East Department; and as Assistant Under-Secretary of State for the European Communities, where he was principally involved in the negotiations for a UK budget rebate which was achieved at Fontainebleau in 1984; and in the negotiations for Greece, Portugal and Spain to join the European Communities. In 1984, he was appointed Minister and Deputy to the UK's Ambassador in Washington. In 1985, he was appointed UK Ambassador and Permanent Representative to the European Communities where he served through the negotiation of the Single European Act, which laid the foundations for the Single Market and through the first steps towards a single currency.

In 1990, he was appointed UK Ambassador and Permanent Representative to the UN and Permanent Member of the UN Security Council. He served through the reversal and the settlement of the Iraqi aggression against Kuwait; through the wars following the break-up of Jugoslavia; the restoration of peace to Cambodia; and many other peacekeeping operations. He retired from the UK Diplomatic Service in 1995.

Following retirement, he was appointed as UK Special Representative for Cyprus (1996–2003) where he worked with the UN Secretary-General and the EU to bring about a settlement of the Cyprus dispute on the basis of a bi-zonal, bi-communal federation. From 2003 to 2006, he served as a member of Kofi Annan's High Level Panel on Threats, Challenges and Change putting together a significant number of reforms, including the "Responsibility to Protect", which were endorsed by the UN summit meeting in 2006.

Hannay held a number of non-executive commercial jobs (Chime Communications, Aegis) including serving as a member of the Tangguh Independent Advisory Panel, which gave advice to BP on the development of a large natural gas field in West Papua, Indonesia.

== Honours and awards ==
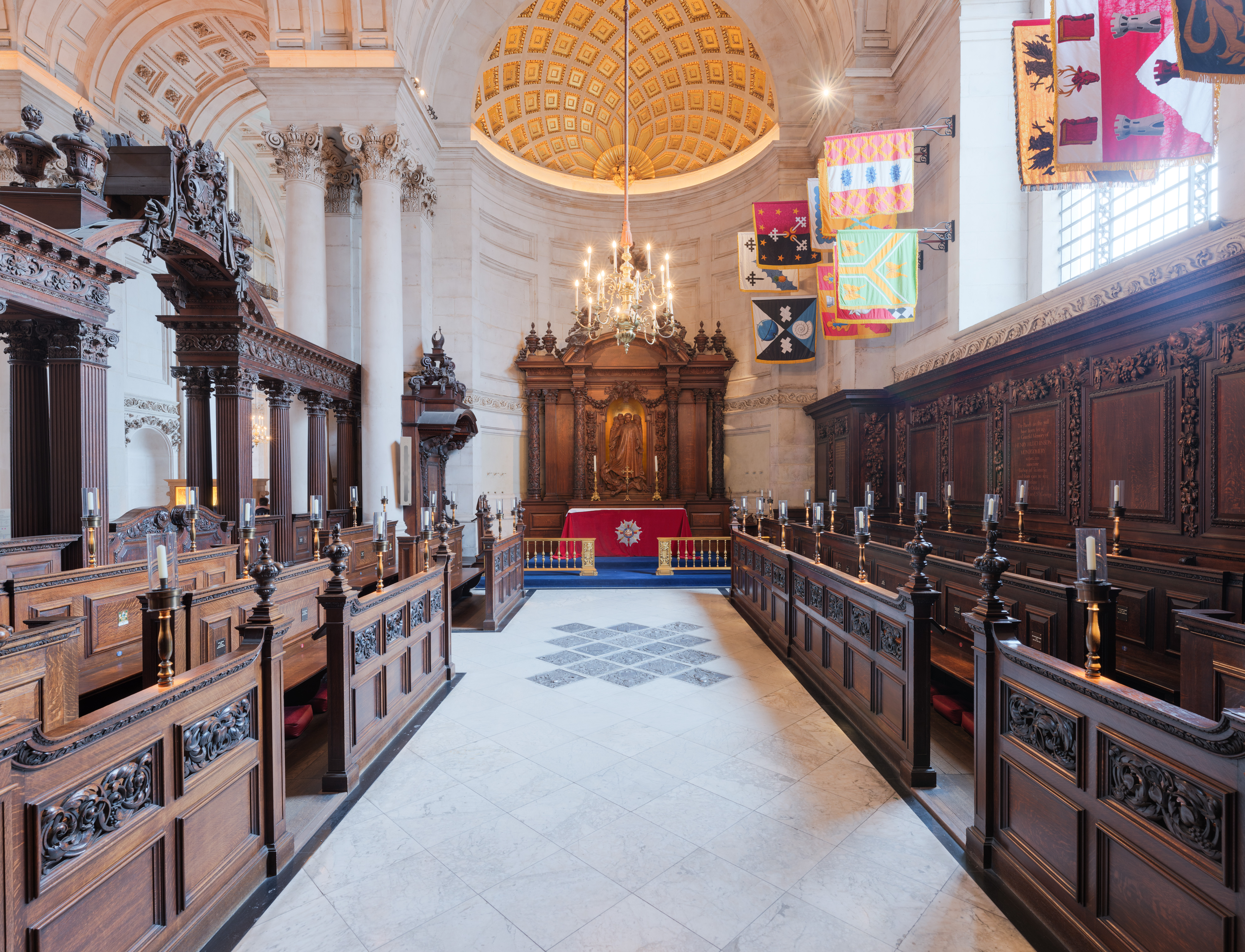
Lord Hannay's heraldic banner visible in the Chapel of the Order of St Michael and St George in St Paul's Cathedral, London

In 1981, he was appointed a Companion of the Order of St Michael and St George (CMG), in 1986 a Knight Commander (KCMG) and in 1995 a Knight Grand Cross (GCMG).

On 19 June 2001, he was appointed a life peer as Baron Hannay of Chiswick, of Bedford Park in the London Borough of Ealing, his name having been put forward by the newly-created House of Lords Appointment Commission; and he has served throughout as a crossbench member of the House of Lords. He served there on a number of Select Committees (European Affairs, International Relations, International Agreements among others).

He was a member of the Council of Britain in Europe (1999) and served in other European consultative bodies, including as Chair of the European and International Analysts Group (2015–2026).

He was a member of the Council of the University of Birmingham, and was its Chair and Pro-Chancellor (2001–2006). He was a member of the Council of the University of Kent.

In the 2003 Birthday Honours, he was made a Member of the Order of the Companions of Honour.

Hannay was awarded the honorary degree of Doctor of Letters by the University of Birmingham in 2003.

== Family ==
Hannay was married to Gillian, who died in 2015. They had four sons (Richard, Philip, Jonathan and Alexander), twelve grandchildren and three great-grandchildren.

== Arms ==
Coat of arms of David Hannay, Baron Hannay of Chiswick
Crest A hoopoe wings elevated inverted and addorsed Proper. Escutcheon Per pale Gules and Sable three cross crosslets fitchy in pairle Argent each issuing from a crescent and all within twelve mullets in orle Or. Supporters On either side a roebuck guarant Sable attired and gorged with a plain collar pendant therefrom a bell Or. Motto Per Ardua Ad Alta

== Publications ==
- Cyprus: The Search for a Solution. London: I.B.Tauris, 2005. ISBN 9781850436652
- New World Disorder: The UN after the Cold War - An Insider's View. London: I. B. Tauris, 2008. ISBN 9781845117191
- Britain's Quest for a Role: A Diplomatic Memoir from Europe to the UN. London: I. B. Tauris, 2013. ISBN 9781780760568
- Tale of a Grandfather. Self-published, 2015.
- Britiain in Europe: a losing cause. Self-published, 2021.

Diplomatic posts
Preceded by Sir Michael Butler	UK Permanent Representative to the European Union; 1985–1990	Succeeded by John Kerr, Baron Kerr of Kinlochard
Preceded by Crispin Tickell	UK Permanent Representative to the United Nations; 1990–1995	Succeeded by John Weston
Orders of precedence in the United Kingdom
Preceded by The Lord Rooker	Gentlemen; Baron Hannay of Chiswick	Followed by The Lord Condon
