= Graham Boyce =

British diplomat

Sir Graham Hugh Boyce KCMG (born 6 October 1945) is a British retired diplomat.

== Education ==
Boyce was educated at Hurstpierpoint College and at Jesus College, Cambridge.

== Career ==
Boyce was in the Diplomatic Service between 1968 and 2003. Boyce was Consul-General to Sweden from 1987 to 1990. Boyce was Ambassador and Consul-General to Qatar from 1990–1993. He served as Ambassador to Kuwait 1996–1999 and Ambassador to Egypt 1999–2001.

After leaving the Foreign and Commonwealth Office Boyce worked for a number of companies in an advisory capacity including being on the advisory board of Lehman Brothers Middle East, Merchant International Group and Invensys. He is an advisor to Nomura, DLA Piper, and Air Products and Chemicals. He has also been a consultant to UK-based arms company BAE Systems, and deputy chairman of UK-based arms company Vosper Thorneycroft.

== Awards and honours ==
Boyce was invested as a Companion of the Order of St. Michael and St. George (CMG) in 1991, and as a Knight Commander of the Order of St. Michael and St. George (KCMG) in 2001.

== Personal life ==
Boyce married Janet Elizabeth Spencer on 11 April 1970. They have four children.

Boyce is the son of Commander Hugh Boyce and brother to Philip Boyce, who was president of the Royal College of Psychiatry in Australia, and Lord Boyce, former First Sea Lord of the Royal Navy and Chief of the Defence Staff.

== Sources ==
- Mosley, Charles, ed. (2003). Burke's Peerage, Baronetage & Knightage. Vol. 1 (107th ed.). Wilmington, DE: Burke's Peerage & Gentry. p. 466. ISBN 978-0-9711966-2-9. OCLC 150226262.
- Ragab, Ghada (19–25 July 2001). "Hooked on Egypt". Al-Ahram Weekly (543). Archived from the original on 24 July 2009.

Diplomatic posts
Preceded by Patrick Nixon	British Ambassador to Qatar; 1990–1993	Succeeded by Patrick Wogan
Preceded by William Fullerton	British Ambassador to Kuwait; 1996–1999	Succeeded by Sir Richard Muir
Preceded by Sir David Blatherwick	British Ambassador to Egypt; 1999–2001	Succeeded by Sir John Sawers
