= John Cheshire (RAF officer) =

British Royal Air Force commander

Sir John Cheshire
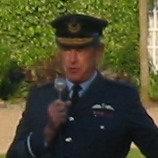
- Cheshire addresses the public at Government House, Jersey, at a reception to mark the Queen's Birthday, 2005
- Born: 4 September 1942 (age 84)
- Relatives: Air Chief Marshal Sir Walter Cheshire (father)
- Military career
- Allegiance: United Kingdom
- Branch: Royal Air Force
- Service years: 1961–2000
- Rank: Air Chief Marshal
- Commands: Allied Forces Northwestern Europe; RAF Lyneham
- Awards: Knight Commander of the Order of the British Empire; Companion of the Order of the Bath

Air Chief Marshal Sir John Anthony Cheshire, KBE, CB (born 4 September 1942) is a retired senior Royal Air Force (RAF) commander.

== RAF career ==
Born the son of Group Captain (later Air Chief Marshal Sir) Walter Cheshire, and educated at Ipswich School and Worksop College, Cheshire joined the Royal Air Force as an officer cadet at the RAF College Cranwell in 1961. He was commissioned as a pilot officer on 17 December 1963, and was successively promoted to flying officer (17 December 1964) and to flight lieutenant (17 June 1966). He was promoted to squadron leader on 1 July 1971, and to wing commander on 1 July 1977.

In the late 1970s, Cheshire served as Commander of the Special Forces Flight, and then joined the Air Plans Directorate of the Ministry of Defence. He was appointed Commander of the Air Wing of the Royal Brunei Air Force (RBAirF) in Brunei Darussalam in 1980, for which he was appointed an Officer of the Order of the British Empire in the 1982 Birthday Honours. He became the station commander at RAF Lyneham in 1982 and, after his promotion to group captain on 1 July, Group Captain Contingency Plans at Headquarters United Kingdom Air Forces. He went on to be air attache in Moscow in 1987, and was promoted to air commodore on 1 January 1988. He became Deputy Commandant of the RAF Staff College, Bracknell in 1990, and was appointed a Commander of the Order of the British Empire in the 1991 New Year Honours. He was promoted to air vice marshal on 1 January 1992, and appointed Assistant Chief of Staff Policy and Requirements at the Supreme Headquarters Allied Powers Europe. As an acting air marshal, he was appointed a Companion of the Order of the Bath in the 1994 New Year Honours. He was knighted a Knight Commander of the Order of the British Empire in the 1995 New Year Honours, and promoted to air marshal on 23 January 1995. Appointed UK Military Representative to NATO in 1995, he was appointed Commander-in-Chief, Allied Forces Northwestern Europe on 11 March 1997, with a promotion to air chief marshal. Cheshire retired in 2000.

== Jersey and later life ==
In retirement, Cheshire was the Lieutenant Governor of Jersey from 24 January 2001 to 7 April 2006. He was appointed chairman of the Royal Air Force Charitable Trust in July 2008.

Cheshire was married until the passing of his wife; he has a son and daughter, and three grandchildren.

On 22 April 2022, Cheshire was recognised with a road being named in his honour at the Royal Brunei Air Force Base, Rimba in Brunei. Appearing at the road naming event by video link, Mohammad Sharif Ibrahim, the head of the Royal Brunei Air Force, named the road Cheshire Lane.

Military offices
Preceded by Sir Edward Jones	UK Military Representative to NATO; 1995–1997	Succeeded by Sir Paul Haddacks
Preceded by Sir Richard Johns	Commander-in-Chief Allied Forces North West Europe; 1997–2000	Command disbanded Responsibilities transferred to Regional HQ AFNORTH
Government offices
Preceded by Sir Michael Wilkes	Lieutenant Governor of Jersey; 2001–2006	Succeeded by Sir Andrew Ridgway
