= Angus Lapsley =

British civil servant

Angus Lapsley CMG
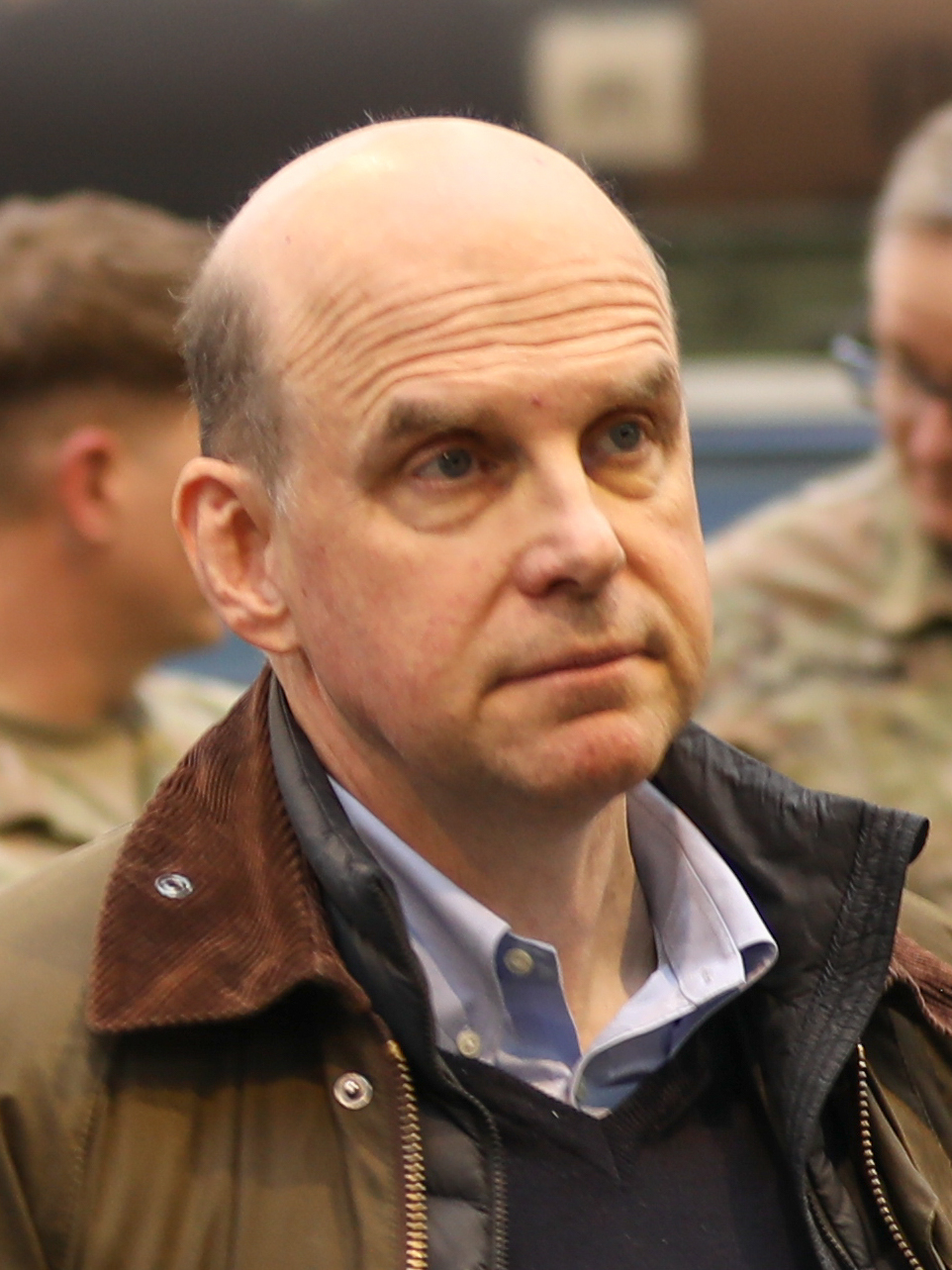
- Lapsley in 2024

Permanent Representative of the United Kingdom to NATO
- Incumbent
- Assumed office April 2025
- Monarch: Charles III
- Prime Minister: Keir Starmer Andy Burnham
- Preceded by: David Quarrey

NATO Assistant Secretary General for Defence Policy and Planning
- In office September 2022 – April 2025

Personal details
- Education: University of Oxford

Angus Charles William Lapsley CMG is a British civil servant and diplomat who served as the NATO Assistant Secretary General for Defence Policy and Planning from September 2022 to April 2025. In April 2025 he was appointed to serve as UK Permanent Representative to NATO.

== Biography ==
Lapsley attended Warwick School from 1981 to 1988. He studied English Language and Literature at the University of Oxford.

He joined the Civil Service in 1991, working in the Department of Health and then the UK Representation to the European Union, before serving as the Home Affairs Private Secretary.

In 1999 he joined the FCO, leading the EU Institutions Unit during the Nice Treaty negotiations. He served in Paris between 2001 and 2005 on foreign and security policy issues. From 2006 he was Deputy Balkans Co-ordinator, and from 2006 to 2010 he was Counsellor and Head of the Common and Foreign Security Policy (CFSP), Common Security and Defence Policy and EU Enlargement team at the UK Representation to the EU.

He was Director (Americas) in the FCO, before moving to the Cabinet Office as Director in the European and Global Issues Secretariat in April 2012. He also led the Cabinet Office's role on the review of the balance of competences between the UK and the EU.

From March 2015 until September 2017, Lapsley served as the UK's Political and Security Ambassador to the EU.

Lapsley was invested as a companion of the Order of St Michael and St George for services to British foreign policy in the 2019 Birthday Honours.

In 2021, Lapsley was reported to be under consideration for the role of British ambassador to NATO, but came under criticism following an investigation that he had lost MoD documents. He was later appointed to a senior role at NATO Headquarters.

In September 2024, Lapsley was asked to advise on a review of the British government's defence policy.
