= Edward Jones (British Army officer, born 1936) =

British Army general (1936-2007)

General Sir Edward Jones KCB CVO CBE

Gentleman Usher of the Black Rod
- In office 9 May 1995 – 8 May 2001
- Monarch: Elizabeth II
- Preceded by: Sir Richard Thomas
- Succeeded by: Sir Michael Willcocks

Personal details
- Born: 25 September 1936 Altrincham, England
- Died: 14 May 2007 (aged 70) Inverness-shire, Scotland
- Spouse: Suzanne Leschallas (m. 1965)
- Parent: General Sir Charles Jones (father)
- Education: Portora Royal School
- Alma mater: Pembroke College, Cambridge

Military service
- Allegiance: United Kingdom
- Branch/service: British Army
- Years of service: 1956–1995
- Rank: General
- Commands: 3rd Armoured Division; 6th Armoured Brigade; 1st Battalion Royal Green Jackets
- Battles/wars: Cyprus Emergency; Indonesia–Malaysia confrontation The Troubles; United Nations Peacekeeping Force in Cyprus
- Awards: Knight Commander of the Order of the Bath; Commander of the Royal Victorian Order; Commander of the Order of the British Empire; Mentioned in Despatches

Sir Charles Edward Webb Jones, KCB, CVO, CBE (25 September 1936 – 14 May 2007) was a senior officer in the British Army. He served as Quartermaster-General and as Britain's military representative to the North Atlantic Treaty Organisation (NATO). He retired from the Army in 1995 to become Gentleman Usher of the Black Rod (or simply Black Rod) in the British Parliament's House of Lords, serving in that office until 2001.

== Early life and education ==
Jones was born in Altrincham in Cheshire. His father was General Sir Charles Phibbs Jones. Uniquely, he and his father were the only father and son to be members of the Army Board during the 20th century. He was educated at Portora Royal School in Enniskillen. He went up to Pembroke College, Cambridge, intending to pursue a career in the Diplomatic Service, but left after only 10 days to join the Army instead.

== Military career ==
Jones attended Royal Military Academy Sandhurst, where he won the Infantry Sword of Honour, and was commissioned as an officer in the Oxfordshire and Buckinghamshire Light Infantry in 1956. He served in operations against EOKA in Cyprus. In 1962, Jones commanded the 1st Green Jackets (43rd and 52nd) Guard of Honour for Queen Elizabeth II at High Wycombe, Buckinghamshire, when the 43rd and 52nd colours were marched for the last time. He served in Malaysia, countering incursions by Indonesia into northern Borneo, in the early 1960s. Jones was adjutant of the 1st Green Jackets (43rd and 52nd) whilst the regiment was stationed in Penang and on operations in the Indonesia-Malaysia confrontation. His regiment became the 1st Green Jackets (43rd and 52nd) in 1958, and was merged into The Royal Green Jackets in 1966, becoming its 1st Battalion.

He took command of the 1st Battalion for a tour in South Armagh in 1974/75, and was mentioned in despatches. During his period of command, the internal operations of his battalion were exposed to public scrutiny in Edward Mirzoeff's film, The Regiment. He also served with the United Nations Peacekeeping Force in Cyprus in 1976.

In the late 1970s, he was the colonel in charge of MO4, the office at the Ministry of Defence responsible for Northern Ireland at the height of the Troubles, when Airey Neave was murdered by a bomb at the House of Commons car park, and Provisional Irish Republican Army detainees undertook hunger strikes.

Jones attended the Royal College of Defence Studies in 1980, and was promoted to brigadier in 1981 to take command of the 6th Armoured Brigade in Germany, his first duty with the British Army of the Rhine. He then took command of a British military team in Zimbabwe in 1983, establishing a working relationship with Robert Mugabe in the years after Zimbabwe became independent in 1980, for which he was appointed a Commander of the Order of the British Empire.

Jones was promoted to major general in 1985, and became Director-General of the Territorial Army at the Ministry of Defence. He then took command of the 3rd Armoured Division in Germany in 1987. He was appointed a Knight Commander of the Order of the Bath in 1988 when he was promoted to lieutenant general, when he returned to London to become Quartermaster-General to the Forces. He was tasked with remodelling the Army's logistics after the end of the Cold War, and continued in that position through the 1991 Gulf War. He was also Colonel Commandant of the Royal Army Education Corps from 1986 to 1992, and of the Royal Green Jackets from 1988 to 1995.

Jones was promoted general in 1992, and became the UK Military Representative to NATO in Brussels, where he was able to make use of his fluent French.

== Retirement ==
Jones retired from the army in 1995 to become Gentleman Usher of the Black Rod (and ex officio Serjeant-at-Arms in the House of Lords, and Secretary to the Lord Great Chamberlain). The House of Lords Act 1999 was passed during his period of service, ending the right of hereditary peers to sit in the House of Lords. He served as Black Rod from 9 May 1995 to 8 May 2001, and was appointed a Commander of the Royal Victorian Order when he retired in 2001.

Jones was a commissioner of the Royal Hospital, Chelsea and chairman of the Council of Territorial Army, Volunteers and Reserves Associations from 1995 to 2001. He was also a vice-patron of St Dunstan's, a governor of Wellington College from 1997 to 2007, and chairman of the governors of Eagle House from 1999 to 2007.

== Personal life ==
Jones married Suzanne Leschallas in 1965. They had two sons and a daughter together. He retired to a village in Wiltshire. He died while fishing on the River Findhorn in Inverness-shire.

Military offices
Preceded by David Ramsbotham	GOC 3rd Armoured Division; 1987–1988	Succeeded by Michael Wilkes
Preceded by Sir Charles Huxtable	Quartermaster-General to the Forces; 1988–1991	Succeeded by Sir John Learmont
Preceded by Sir Richard Thomas	UK Military Representative to NATO; 1992–1995	Succeeded by Sir John Cheshire
Government offices
Preceded by Sir Richard Thomas	Black Rod; 1995–2001	Succeeded by Sir Michael Willcocks
