= Permanent Representative of the United Kingdom to the United Nations =

Diplomatic position in the UK Foreign & Commonwealth Office

His Britannic Majesty's Permanent Representative from the United Kingdom of Great Britain and Northern Ireland to the United Nations
- Arms of the United Kingdom

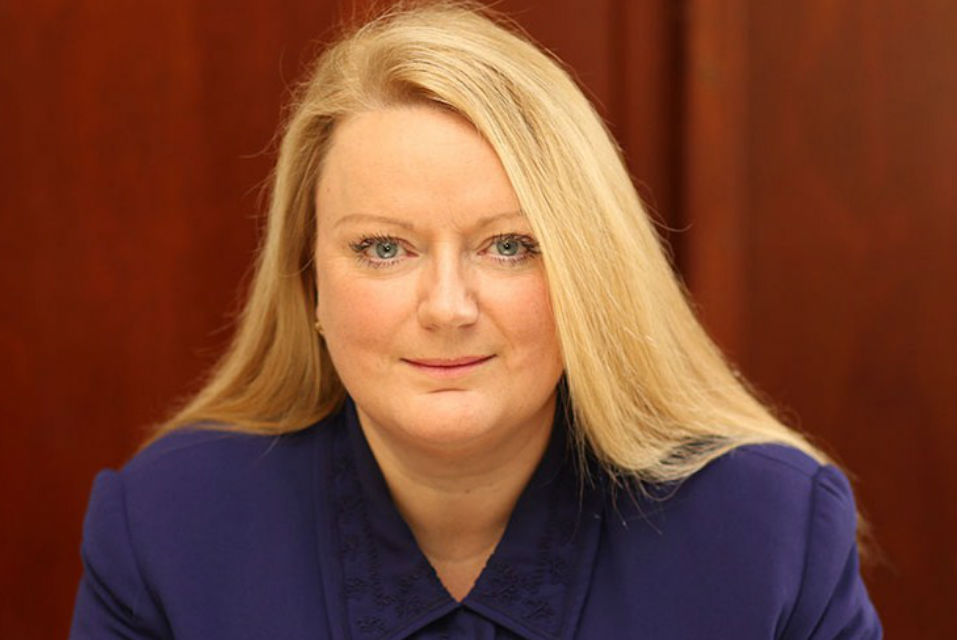
- Incumbent; Dame Sarah MacIntosh since 29 July 2026
- Member of: United Nations Security Council; United Nations General Assembly
- Reports to: Prime Minister; Secretary of State for Foreign, Commonwealth and Development Affairs; Permanent Under Secretary of Foreign, Commonwealth & Development Affairs and Head of HM Diplomatic Service
- Appointer: King Charles III as Sovereign (on advice of the prime minister)
- Inaugural holder: Sir Alexander Cadogan
- Formation: 1946
- Website: UK Mission to the United Nations (New York)

The permanent representative of the United Kingdom to the United Nations is the United Kingdom's foremost diplomatic representative to the United Nations, and in charge of the United Kingdom Mission to the United Nations (UKMIS). UK permanent representatives to the UN hold the personal rank of ambassador. The full official title and style is His Britannic Majesty's Permanent Representative from the United Kingdom of Great Britain and Northern Ireland to the United Nations.

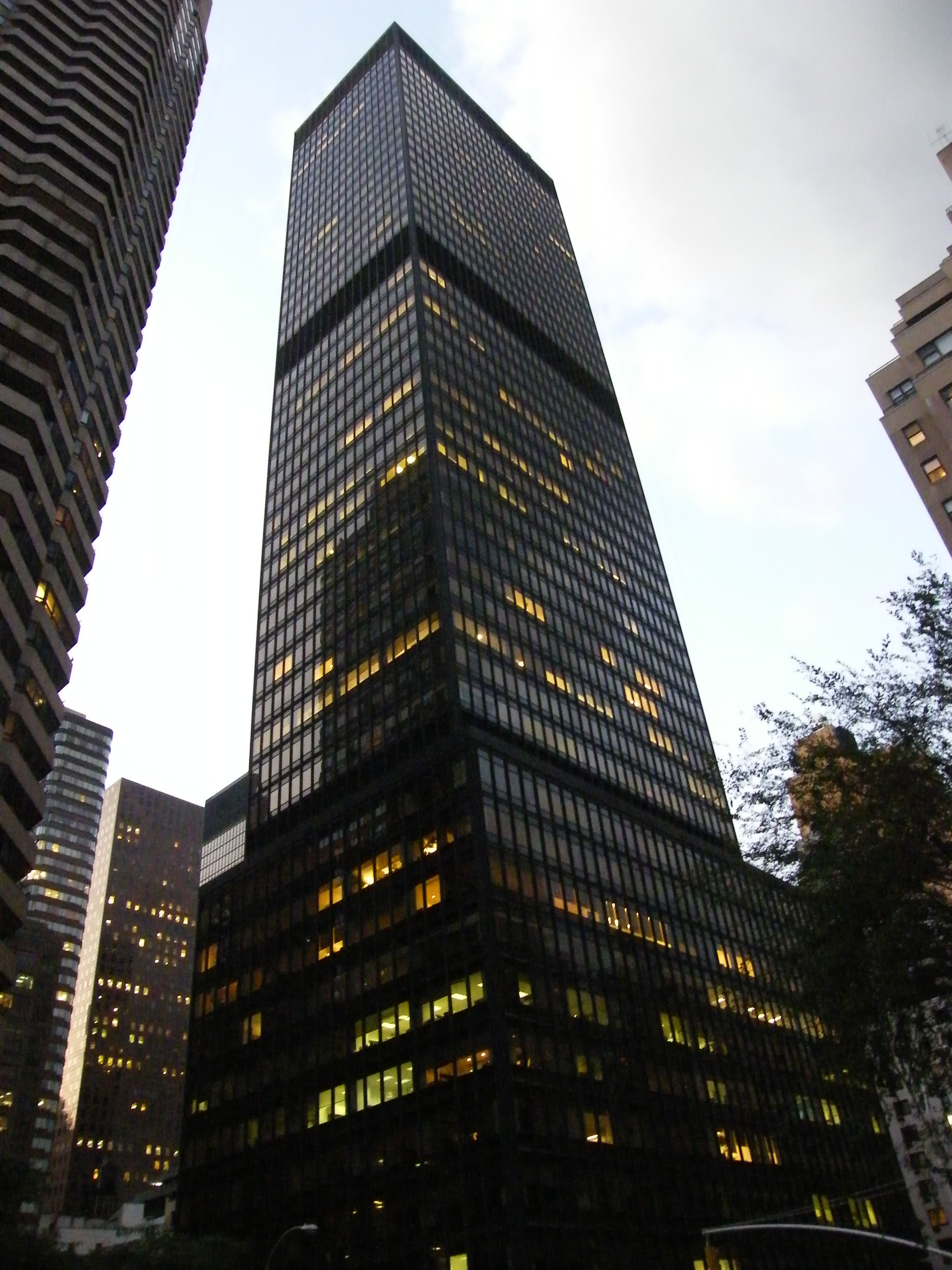
Seat of the permanent representative of the United Kingdom to the United Nations in One Dag Hammarskjöld Plaza, 885 Second Avenue, New York City

== Permanent representatives to the United Nations ==
Image	Incumbent	Start of term	End of term
	Sir Alexander Cadogan	1946	1950
	Sir Gladwyn Jebb	1950	1954
	Sir Pierson Dixon	1954	1960
	Sir Patrick Dean	1960	1964
	Lord Caradon	1964	1970
	Sir Colin Crowe	1970	1973
	Sir Donald Maitland	1973	1974
	Lord Richard	1974	1979
	Sir Anthony Parsons	1979	1982
	Sir John Thomson	1982	1987
	Sir Crispin Tickell	1987	1990
	Sir David Hannay	1990	1995
	Sir John Weston	1995	1998
	Sir Jeremy Greenstock	1998	2003
	Sir Emyr Jones Parry	2003	2007
	Sir John Sawers	2007	2009
	Sir Mark Lyall Grant	2009	2015
	Sir Matthew Rycroft	2015	2018
	Jonathan Allen; Chargé d'Affaires ad interim	2018	2018
	Dame Karen Pierce	2018	2020
	Jonathan Allen; Chargé d'Affaires ad interim	2020	2020
	Dame Barbara Woodward	2020	2025
	James Kariuki CMG; Chargé d'Affaires ad interim	2025	2026
	Dame Sarah MacIntosh	2026	

== See also ==
- United Kingdom and the United Nations
