= Paul Johnston (diplomat) =

British diplomat (born 1968)

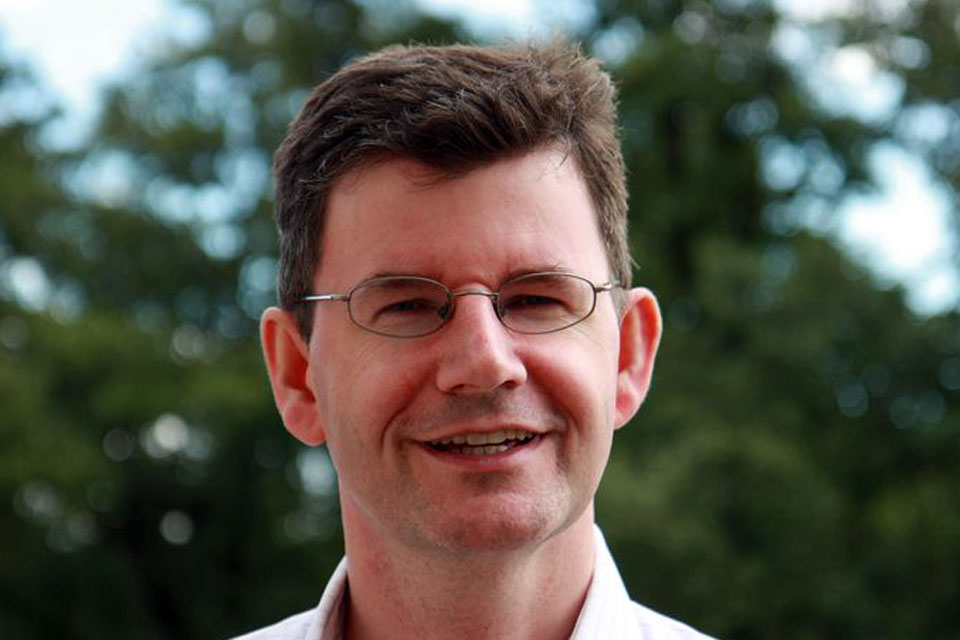
- Johnston in Stockholm on 6 September 2011

British Ambassador to Ireland
- In office September 2020 – September 2025
- Monarchs: Elizabeth II; Charles III
- Prime Minister: Boris Johnson; Liz Truss; Rishi Sunak; Keir Starmer
- Preceded by: Robin Barnett
- Succeeded by: Kara Owen

Permanent Representative of the United Kingdom to NATO
- Acting; 2016–2017
- Monarch: Elizabeth II
- Prime Minister: Theresa May
- Preceded by: Adam Thomson
- Succeeded by: Dame Sarah MacIntosh

Deputy Permanent Representative of the United Kingdom to NATO
- In office 2015–2017
- Monarch: Elizabeth II
- Prime Minister: David Cameron; Theresa May

British Ambassador to Sweden
- In office August 2011 – August 2015
- Monarch: Elizabeth II
- Prime Minister: David Cameron
- Preceded by: Andrew Jonathan Mitchell
- Succeeded by: David Cairns

Personal details
- Born: 29 May 1968 (age 58)
- Education: University of Glasgow

Paul Johnston (born 29 May 1968) is a former British diplomat who was Ambassador of the United Kingdom to Ireland from 2020 to 2025. He was appointed Director General of Irish Universities Association in August 2025.

== Early life ==
Paul Charles Johnston was born on 29 May 1968 to Charles Johnston and Muriel Johnston (née Hall).

Charles Johnston worked for Woolworth's. Muriel Johnston worked for a trade union and is active in the Galashiels Opera.

Johnston was educated at St Margaret's Primary School and then the Galashiels Academy in Galashiels, Scotland. At Galashiels Johnston studied French, German, and Spanish and described the efforts of his languages teacher as a possible inspiration for joining the Foreign Office. Johnston then attended the University of Glasgow, graduating with an MA (Hons) in Political Science and Government.

In his youth, Johnston participated in performances of The King and I and Carousel for the Galashiels Opera.

== Career ==
Paul Johnston joined the Civil Service in 1990, working for the Ministry of Defence until 1993.

In 1993, Johnston joined the Foreign and Commonwealth Office as the Desk Officer for Bosnia until 1995.

Johnston served as the Private Secretary to the British Ambassador to France from 1995 to 1999. This was Johnston's first foreign posting.

Johnston described negotiating on behalf of the European Union on the language on the responsibility to protect, adopted by the UN World Summit in 2005, as a personal highlight of his career.

Johnston was appointed the British Ambassador to Sweden from August 2011 to August 2015.

Johnston was the British Permanent Representative to NATO from 2016 to 2017.

He served as the British ambassador to the European Union's Political and Security Committee from 2017 to January 2020.

=== Ambassador to Ireland ===
Johnston was appointed the British Ambassador to Ireland in September 2020.

In December 2020, Johnston published an open letter describing the EU–UK Trade and Cooperation Agreement as a "good deal for the UK and the EU, and in particular for the UK and Ireland".

On 5 March 2021, the Irish Times published a letter from Johnston, setting out the rationale for the decision of the British government to unilaterally extend the grace period for post-Brexit checks on some goods entering Northern Ireland from Great Britain.

In March 2021, Johnston revealed that Ireland was "high up" on the list of countries to receive surplus COVID-19 vaccines once British vaccination targets were met.

In June 2025, the Irish Times reported that Johnston was to leave the diplomatic service after his posting ended in September of that year, but would remain in Ireland, although he was not yet able to disclose what role he would take up, as it was "subject to a UK government approval process".

=== Post Ambassadorial Career ===
In August 2025, the Irish Universities Association appointed Johnston as Director General. This role is due to commence in November 2025

== Personal life ==
Johnston married Nicola Carol Maskell in 2004. Johnston walks recreationally.

Diplomatic posts
Preceded by Andrew Jonathan Mitchell	British Ambassador to Sweden; 2011–2015	Succeeded by David Cairns
Preceded by Adam Thomson	British Permanent Representative to NATO; 2016–2017	Succeeded by Dame Sarah MacIntosh
Preceded by Robin Barnett	British Ambassador to Ireland; 2020–present	Incumbent
