= Anthony Dymock =

Royal Navy admiral

Vice Admiral Sir Anthony Dymock KBE CB FRSA
- Born: 18 July 1949 (age 77); Liverpool, England
- Military career
- Allegiance: United Kingdom
- Branch: Royal Navy
- Service years: 1971–2008
- Rank: Vice Admiral
- Commands: 2nd Frigate Squadron; HMS Cornwall; HMS Campbeltown; HMS Plymouth
- Conflicts: Falklands War; Gulf War
- Awards: Knight Commander of the Order of the British Empire; Companion of the Order of the Bath

Vice Admiral Sir Anthony Knox Dymock, KBE, CB, FRSA (born 18 July 1949) is a retired senior Royal Navy officer.

== Naval career ==
Educated at Brighton Hove and Sussex Grammar School, University of East Anglia where he graduated in Russian and Philosophy, and the Royal Naval College Dartmouth, Dymock joined the Royal Navy in 1971. He served in the Falklands War, was promoted to commander on 30 June 1985, and became commanding officer of HMS Plymouth in 1985. He was Deputy Commander of the UK Task Group during the Gulf War, and commanding officer of HMS Campbeltown in 1992. He went on to be commanding officer of HMS Cornwall and captain of the 2nd Frigate Squadron in 1996, Deputy Commander of Strike Force South at NATO in 2000, and Head of the British Defence Staff and Defence Attaché in Washington, D.C. in 2002. His last appointment was as UK Military Representative to NATO from 2006 until he retired in February 2009.

Dymock is an alumnus of Harvard's Kennedy School Senior Executive Security Program, and has lectured on security at the National Defense University and the Massachusetts Institute of Technology. He became a Fellow of the Royal Society of Arts in 2005. He is also a Member of the Nautical Institute and a Freeman of the City of London.

Military offices
Preceded by John Thompson	Head of the British Defence Staff in Washington, D.C. 2002–2005	Succeeded by Peter Gilchrist
Preceded by Sir Robert Wright	UK Military Representative to NATO; 2006–2008	Succeeded by Sir David Bill
