= Robert Wright (RAF officer) =

British Royal Air Force officer, born 1947

Sir Robert Wright
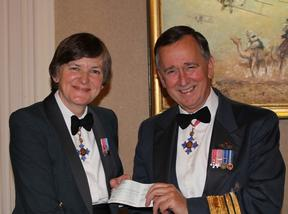
- Wright (right) with Air Cdre Barbara Cooper, 2010
- Born: 10 June 1947 (age 79)
- Military career
- Allegiance: United Kingdom
- Branch: Royal Air Force
- Service years: 1966–2006
- Rank: Air Marshal
- Commands: RAF Bruggen; No. 9 Squadron
- Conflicts: Stabilisation Force in Bosnia and Herzegovina
- Awards: Knight Commander of the Order of the British Empire; Air Force Cross

Air Marshal Sir Robert Alfred Wright, KBE, AFC (born 10 June 1947) is a former senior Royal Air Force officer.

== RAF career ==
Wright joined the Royal Air Force in 1966. He became commanding officer of No. 9 Squadron based at RAF Bruggen in 1987, Personal Staff Officer to the Chief of the Air Staff in 1989 and station commander at RAF Bruggen in 1992. He went on to be Assistant Chief of Staff, Policy & Plans at NATO Headquarters at RAF High Wycombe in 1994, Air Commander Operations at Headquarters RAF Strike Command in 1995 and Military Advisor to the High Representative for Bosnia and Herzegovina in 1997. After that he became chief of staff to the Air Member for Personnel and Deputy Commander-in-Chief RAF Personnel and Training Command in 1998, Assistant Chief of Staff Policy & Requirements at SHAPE in 2000 and UK Military Representative to NATO and the European Union in 2002 before retiring in 2006.

In retirement Wright became Controller of the RAF Benevolent Fund.

Military offices
Preceded by Sir Kevin O'Donoghue	UK Military Representative to NATO; 2002–2006	Succeeded by Sir Anthony Dymock
