= Mark Lyall Grant =

British diplomat (born 1956)

Sir Mark Lyall Grant GCMG
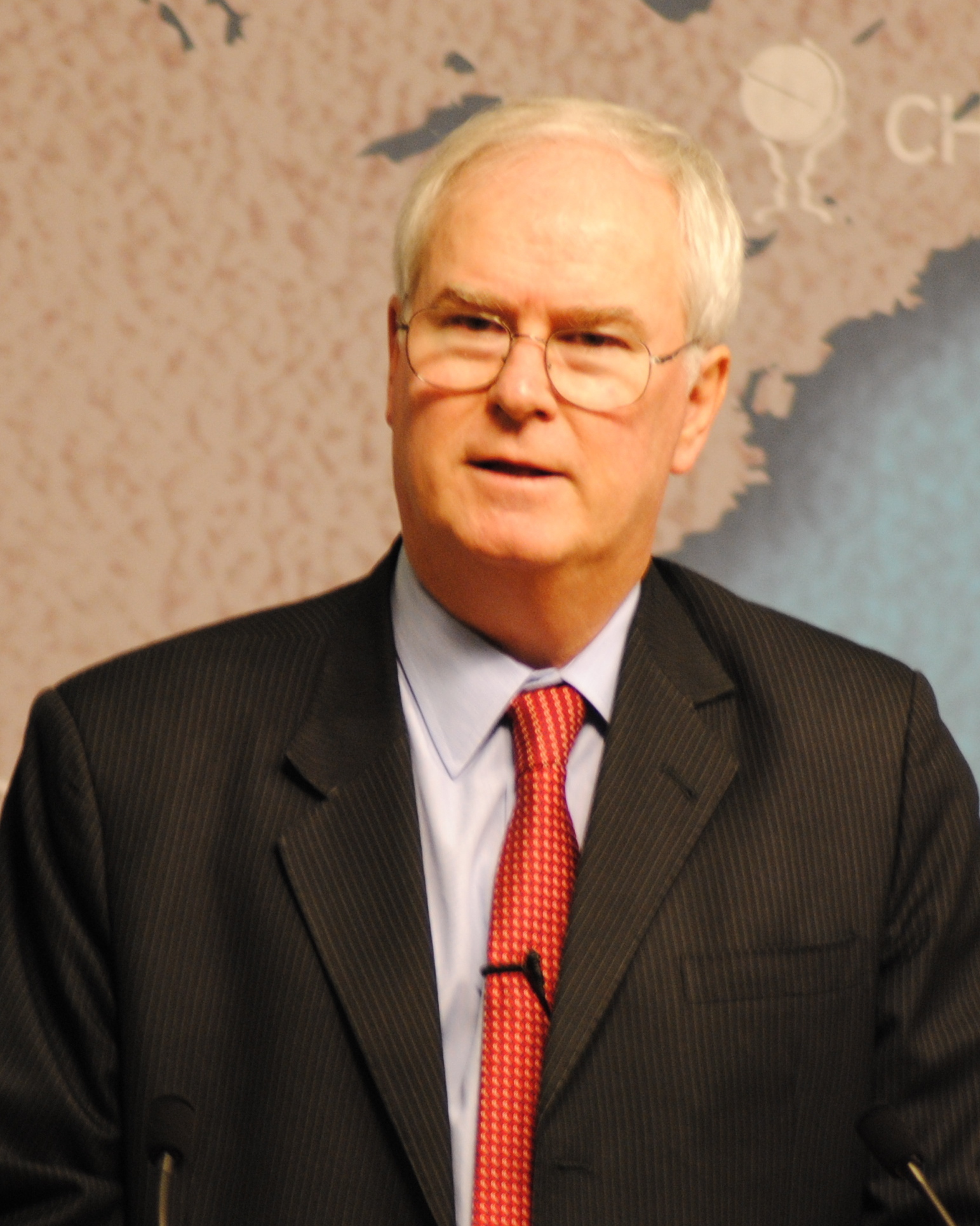
- Mark Lyall Grant speaking at Chatham House in 2011

United Kingdom National Security Adviser
- In office 7 September 2015 – 13 April 2017
- Prime Minister: David Cameron; Theresa May
- Preceded by: Kim Darroch
- Succeeded by: Mark Sedwill

Permanent Representative of the United Kingdom to the United Nations
- In office 1 November 2009 – 25 April 2015
- Monarch: Elizabeth II
- Prime Minister: Gordon Brown; David Cameron
- Preceded by: John Sawers
- Succeeded by: Matthew Rycroft

Director-General for Political Affairs at the United Kingdom Foreign and Commonwealth Office
- In office 2007–2009
- Preceded by: John Sawers
- Succeeded by: Geoffrey Adams

Personal details
- Born: 29 May 1956 (age 69) Hammersmith, London, England
- Spouse(s): Sheila, Lady Lyall Grant
- Children: 2
- Education: Eton College
- Alma mater: University of Cambridge
- Website: www.gov.uk/government/people/mark-lyall-grant

Sir Mark Justin Lyall Grant GCMG (born 29 May 1956) is a former senior British diplomat who was previously the United Kingdom's National Security Adviser and Permanent Representative of the United Kingdom to the United Nations.

== Education and early life ==
Born in Hammersmith to Mary (née Moore) and Maj Gen Ian Lyall Grant MC, Lyall Grant was educated at Eton College and read law at Trinity College, Cambridge. He was called to the bar at Middle Temple, London before joining the Foreign and Commonwealth Office in 1980.

== Career ==
Lyall Grant was British Permanent Representative to the United Nations (UN) from 2009 to 2015. He held the office of President of the United Nations Security Council four times: in November 2010, March 2012, June 2013, and August 2014.

Lyall Grant was appointed a Companion of the Order of St Michael and St George (CMG) in the 2003 New Year Honours before being promoted to Knight Commander (KCMG) in the 2006 Birthday Honours and a Knight Grand Cross in the 2018 New Year Honours.

On 7 July 2015, Number 10 Downing St announced that Lyall Grant would replace Sir Kim Darroch as the United Kingdom's National Security Advisor on 7 September 2015, with Darroch moving to a different diplomatic post. As of September 2015, Lyall Grant was paid a salary of between £160,000 and £164,999, making him one of the 328 most highly paid people in the British public sector at that time. On 27 February 2017 it was announced that Lyall Grant would retire in April and be replaced by the Home Office Permanent Secretary Mark Sedwill. Since 2017, he has served on the governing board at Eton College.

He was appointed King of Arms of the Order of St Michael and St George in 2022.

=== Foreign and Commonwealth Office career timeline ===
- 2015–17 National Security Adviser
- 2009–15 British Permanent Representative to the United Nations
- 2007–09 FCO, Director General for Political Affairs
- 2003–06 High Commissioner to Pakistan
- 2000–03 FCO director, Africa
- 1998–2000 Head, European Union department, FCO
- 1996–98 Deputy High Commissioner and Consul General, South Africa
- 1994–96 Seconded to European Secretariat, Cabinet Office
- 1990–93 First Secretary, Paris
- 1987–89 Private Secretary to Minister of State, FCO
- 1985–87 FCO
- 1982–85 Second Secretary, Islamabad
- 1980–82 FCO, worked in Southern Africa department

== Personal life ==
His wife, Sheila, is also a diplomat. In April 2012, Lady Lyall Grant, with Huberta von Voss Wittig, made a video appeal to Asma al-Assad, calling on the Syrian first lady to take a stand against violence in her country. The Lyall Grants have a son and a daughter. Lyall Grant's spare time activities include golf, tennis, and bridge.

== Offices held ==
Government offices
Preceded by Sir John Sawers	Director-General, Political of the Foreign and Commonwealth Office; 2007–2009	Succeeded by Sir Geoffrey Adams
Preceded by Sir Kim Darroch	National Security Advisor; 7 September 2015– April 2017	Succeeded by Mark Sedwill
Diplomatic posts
Preceded by Sir John Sawers	United Kingdom; Permanent Representative to the United Nations; 2009–2015	Succeeded by Matthew Rycroft
