= John Sawers =

British intelligence officer, diplomat and civil servant

Sir John Sawers GCMG

15th Chief of the Secret Intelligence Service
- In office 1 November 2009 – 1 November 2014
- Prime Minister: Gordon Brown; David Cameron
- Preceded by: Sir John Scarlett
- Succeeded by: Sir Alex Younger

Permanent Representative of the United Kingdom to the United Nations
- In office 1 August 2007 – 1 November 2009
- Prime Minister: Gordon Brown
- Preceded by: Sir Emyr Jones Parry
- Succeeded by: Sir Mark Lyall Grant

Director-General for Political Affairs at the Foreign and Commonwealth Office
- In office 2003–2007
- Preceded by: Sir Peter Ricketts
- Succeeded by: Sir Mark Lyall Grant

British Ambassador to Egypt
- In office 2001–2003
- Prime Minister: Tony Blair
- Preceded by: Sir Graham Boyce
- Succeeded by: Sir Derek Plumbly

Personal details
- Born: Robert John Sawers; 26 July 1955 (age 71) Warwick, England
- Education: University of Nottingham; University of St Andrews; University of the Witwatersrand; Harvard University
- Occupation: Intelligence officer; civil servant; diplomat

Sir Robert John Sawers GCMG (born 26 July 1955) is a British intelligence officer, diplomat and civil servant. He was Chief of the Secret Intelligence Service (MI6), a position he held from November 2009 until November 2014. He was previously the British Permanent Representative to the United Nations from August 2007 to November 2009.

== Early life and education ==
Born in Warwick, Sawers was brought up in a family of five children in Bath and educated at the City of Bath Boys' School (which became Beechen Cliff School before he left), where he still holds the 440-yard hurdles school record. He is a descendant of the historic Stratford family through his maternal grandmother. He studied physics and philosophy at the University of Nottingham and later spent periods at the Universities of St Andrews, Witwatersrand and Harvard.

After completing his degree at Nottingham he served as secretary of the students' union for a year.

== Career ==
=== Secret Intelligence Service ===
Sawers joined MI6 in 1977 and was given Foreign and Commonwealth Office cover. He began his career as an intelligence officer and worked under diplomatic cover in Yemen and in Syria in 1982 as a political officer, on behalf of MI6.

=== Foreign and Commonwealth Office ===
Enjoying policy work more than intelligence work, Sawers transitioned to a mainstream diplomatic role in the Foreign and Commonwealth Office, leaving MI6, and took up the role of Desk Officer in the European Union Department in 1984 and Private Secretary to the Minister of State in 1986.

He was based in Pretoria and then Cape Town in South Africa from 1988 to 1991 during the first part of the transition from apartheid. He returned to London and took up the roles of Head of European Union Presidency Planning Unit in 1991 and Principal Private Secretary to Douglas Hurd in 1993.

From 1995 to 1998 he was in the United States and spent a year as an International Fellow at Harvard University and later at the British Embassy in Washington D.C., where he headed the Foreign and Defence Policy team.

From January 1999 to summer 2001 he was seconded to the Cabinet Office as the Foreign Affairs Adviser to UK Prime Minister Tony Blair, dealing with all aspects of foreign and defence policy and working closely with international counterparts. The period included the Kosovo War. He also worked on the Northern Ireland peace process and the implementation of the Good Friday Agreement. He reviewed the Iraq sanctions policy during this period and issued a document that included consideration of regime change.

He next served two years in the Middle East as Ambassador to Egypt from 2001 to 2003, and for three months was seconded as the British Government's Special Representative in Baghdad assisting in the establishment of the Coalition Provisional Authority as the transitional government during the Occupation of Iraq.

In August 2003 Sawers returned to London and was appointed as the Director General for Political Affairs at the Foreign and Commonwealth Office. In this post he was the second most senior diplomat in the country and advised the UK Foreign Secretary on political and security issues worldwide and negotiated on behalf of the Foreign Secretary with international partners in the G8, EU and UN. He was particularly involved in policy on Iran, Iraq, Afghanistan and the Balkans. Sawers headed the British team in the EU-3 negotiations over Iran's nuclear program in 2006, utilising his scientific background in discussions of nuclear matters.

In 2007 he became British Permanent Representative to the United Nations.

=== Chief of the Secret Intelligence Service ===
Sawers re-joined MI6 after almost two decades away in the mainstream diplomatic service and was announced as the chief of the Secret Intelligence Service on 16 June 2009, succeeding Sir John Scarlett. He took up his appointment in November 2009. In July 2009 his family details were removed from the social networking site Facebook following media interest in the contents. On 10 and 16 December 2009 Sawers gave evidence to The Iraq Inquiry. In July 2010 his salary was revealed to the public to be in the range of £160,000 to £169,999.

During the Syrian Civil War Sawers supported the Chief of the Defence Staff General Sir David Richards in drawing up plans to train and equip a Syrian rebel army of 100,000 to overthrow President Bashar al-Assad, as an alternative option to the government's plan for limited direct military involvement. The plans were rejected by the UK National Security Council as too ambitious. Ultimately on 29 August 2013, Parliament refused to support the government's plan to participate in military strikes against the Syrian government.

Sawers announced his intention to stand down from running the Secret Intelligence Service by November 2014, the fifth anniversary of his appointment. He was replaced by Alex Younger.

=== Advisory boards and professorship ===
After retiring as Chief of the Secret Intelligence Service Sawers became Partner and Chairman of Macro Advisory Partners, before becoming the Executive Chairman of Newbridge Advisory. He also became a visiting professor in the Department of War Studies at King's College London. He is a member of the Steering Committee of the Bilderberg Conferences and participated in conferences since 2014 On 14 May 2015 he was appointed independent non-executive director of BP Global.

Sawers is a governor of the Ditchley Foundation, which aims to promote international, especially Anglo-American, relations.

== Honours ==
Sawers was appointed a Companion of the Order of St Michael and St George (CMG) in the 1996 New Year Honours. He was subsequently made a Knight Commander (KCMG) of the same Order in the 2007 Birthday Honours and promoted to Knight Grand Cross (GCMG) in the 2015 New Year Honours for services to national security. He is a Senior Associate Fellow of the Royal United Services Institute (FRUSI).

== Personal life ==
Sawers is married, with two sons and a daughter. He enjoys hiking, playing tennis, cycling and watching theatre.

Diplomatic posts
Preceded by Sir Richard Gozney	Principal Private Secretary to the Foreign Secretary; 1993–1995	Succeeded by Sir William Ehrman
Preceded by Sir John Holmes	Private Secretary for Foreign Affairs to the Prime Minister; 1999–2001	Succeeded by Francis Campbell
Preceded by Sir Graham Boyce	British Ambassador to Egypt; 2001–2003	Succeeded by Sir Derek Plumbly
Preceded by Sir Peter Ricketts	Director-General, Political of the Foreign and Commonwealth Office; 2003–2007	Succeeded by Sir Mark Lyall Grant
Preceded by Sir Emyr Jones Parry	Permanent Representative of the United Kingdom to the United Nations; 2007–2009	Succeeded by Sir Mark Lyall Grant
Government offices
Preceded by Sir John Scarlett	Chief of the SIS; 2009–2014	Succeeded by Alex Younger
