= Jeremy Greenstock =

British diplomat

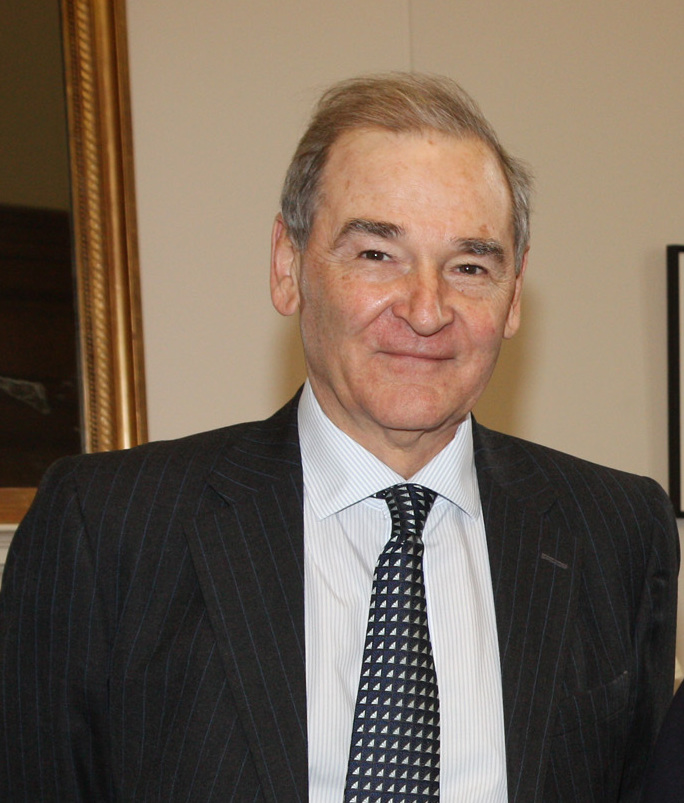
Jeremy Greenstock in 2013

Sir Jeremy Quentin Greenstock GCMG (born 27 July 1943) is a British retired diplomat, active from 1969 to 2004.

== Life and career ==
Greenstock was educated at Harrow School and at Worcester College, Oxford. He was an assistant master at Eton College from 1966 to 1969. Greenstock joined the Foreign and Commonwealth Office in 1969 and served until 2004. He served in the British embassies in Washington, D.C., Paris, Dubai and Saudi Arabia.

=== United Nations work ===
Greenstock was the Permanent Representative of the United Kingdom to the United Nations for five years, from 1998 to July 2003 where he attended over 150 meetings of the United Nations Security Council. From October 2001 to April 2003, he was Chairman of the Security Council's Counter-Terrorism Committee.

In 2003 he acted as the head of a Security Council mission to West Africa to assess the UN activities there, including the work of United Nations Mission in Sierra Leone.

=== Iraq and aftermath ===
In September 2003, Greenstock was appointed the UK's Special Representative for Iraq, where he worked alongside Paul Bremer within the Coalition Provisional Authority.

Greenstock left his position in Baghdad in March 2004, on a timing agreed with the UK government.

Greenstock wrote a book about his role in the Iraq war that was expected to be released in autumn 2005, but was withdrawn from publication at the request of the Foreign and Commonwealth Office. Greenstock appeared on the Charlie Rose talk show on 14 May 2008 and explained some of the contents of his book. During the interview he stated categorically that British and American leaders had known since 1998 that Iraq under Saddam Hussein had no nuclear weapon capabilities or programs.

On 27 November and 15 December 2009, Greenstock gave evidence to the Iraq Inquiry regarding his time as ambassador to the United Nations.

=== Post-retirement ===
After leaving the diplomatic service, Greenstock held numerous positions. He was the Director of the Ditchley Foundation until August 2010 and a Special Adviser to BP from July 2004 to June 2010. Currently he is the Chairman of the United Nations Association of the UK, as well as the Chairman of Gatehouse Advisory Partners and of Lambert Energy Advisory Ltd. He is an advisor to the International Rescue Committee-UK and to the NGO Forward Thinking, and a non-executive director of De La Rue.

He has three children - Katie, Nick, and Alexandra.

From 2007 until 2019 he was King of Arms of the Order of St Michael and St George, the order's herald.

Iraq: The Cost of War – Greenstock's diary of events leading up to, during, and after the Iraq War, which was banned from publication in 2005 after an intervention by then Foreign Secretary Jack Straw – was published in 2016.

Diplomatic posts
Preceded by Sir John Weston	UK Permanent Representative to the United Nations; 1998–2003	Succeeded by Sir Emyr Jones Parry
