= All Wales Convention =

The All Wales Convention was set up by Rhodri Morgan, the First Minister and Ieuan Wyn Jones, the Deputy First Minister of the Welsh Government, to educate the public about the current system of government in Wales and to promote a debate throughout Wales on the National Assembly for Wales’ devolution settlement and whether there should be a referendum on moving to primary law-making powers.

The convention was chaired by Sir Emyr Jones Parry, a former UN ambassador.

The All Wales Convention reported its findings to the First Minister, Rhodri Morgan, on 18 November 2009.

The convention recommended that a referendum be held on giving the Welsh Assembly full law-making powers. Polling by the convention found that 47% would vote "yes" and 37% "no", leading the convention to claim that a yes result would be obtainable. The convention also recommended that a poll be held before June 2010, and said a full law-making Assembly would be better than the current system.

The All Wales Convention also found that the 60 assembly members could handle the additional work that would come from further powers and there should be no increase in members as a result of more powers. After being renamed to the Senedd, plans to increase the numbers of members were increased to 96 were adopted.

== See also ==
- 2011 Welsh devolution referendum
