= Walter Cheshire =

Royal Air Force Air Chief Marshal (1907-1978)

Sir Walter Cheshire
- Born: 21 March 1907
- Died: 10 December 1978 (aged 71)
- Relatives: Air Chief Marshal Sir John Cheshire (son)
- Military career
- Allegiance: United Kingdom
- Branch: Royal Air Force
- Service years: 1926–1965
- Rank: Air Chief Marshal
- Commands: Air Member for Personnel (1961–65); RAF Malta (1959–61); No. 13 Group (1955–57); RAF Staff College, Andover (1952–53); RAF Gibraltar (1950–52); AHQ Indo China (1945–49)
- Conflicts: Second World War
- Awards: Knight Grand Cross of the Order of the British Empire; Knight Commander of the Order of the Bath; Mentioned in Despatches (2)

Air Chief Marshal Sir Walter Graemes Cheshire, GBE, KCB (21 March 1907 – 10 December 1978) was a senior Royal Air Force intelligence officer during the Second World War, and a senior commander in the 1950s and early 1960s.

== RAF career ==
Educated at Downing College, Cambridge, Cheshire joined the Royal Air Force in 1926. He served in the Second World War as Chief Intelligence Officer at Headquarters RAF Bomber Command, as Air Attache in Moscow and as Chief Air Intelligence Officer at Headquarters Air Command South East Asia, before becoming Air Officer Commanding AHQ Indo China in October 1945.

Cheshire provided a short report on his time in French Indo-China, which refers to him commanding non-combat elements of the Japanese Air Force when the Air Officer Commanding in Saigon, Indo-china, for a 1979 SOAS London PhD thesis by Peter Dunn. In 2021 Stuart Hadaway, RAF Historical Branch, gave an illustrated talk on 'Britain's Vietnam War: The RAF Over Indo-China 1945-1946' and this includes Cheshire's role.

After the war Cheshire was made Air Officer Commanding RAF Gibraltar and then Commandant of the RAF Staff College, Andover. He went on to be Air Officer Administration at Headquarters Second Tactical Air Force in 1953, Air Officer Commanding No. 13 Group in 1955 and RAF Instructor at the Imperial Defence College in 1957. Promoted to air marshal, his last roles were as Air Officer Commanding RAF Malta in 1959 and Air Member for Personnel in 1961 before retiring as an air chief marshal in 1965.

Military offices
Preceded by Sir Arthur McDonald	Air Member for Personnel; 1961–1965	Succeeded by Sir David Lee
