= Emyr Jones Parry =

British diplomat (born 1947)

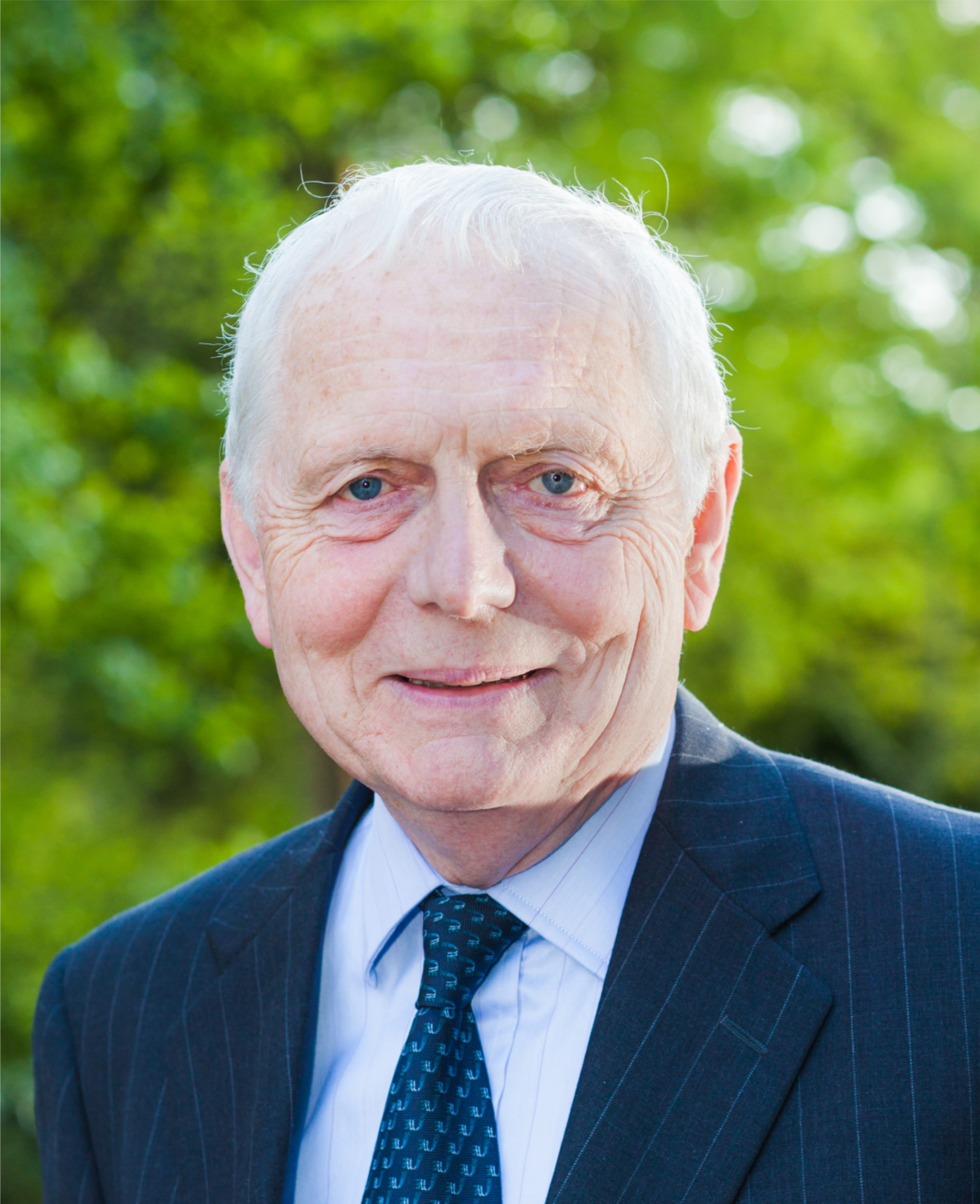
Sir Emyr Jones Parry

Sir Emyr Jones Parry GCMG FInstP FLSW (born 21 September 1947) is a British retired diplomat. He is a former Permanent Representative of the United Kingdom to the United Nations and former UK Permanent Representative on the North Atlantic Council.

== Education ==
Jones Parry was educated at Gwendraeth Grammar School, and went on to take theoretical physics at University College Cardiff (where he was President of the Students' Union). Later, he gained a PhD degree in polymer physics at St Catharine's College, Cambridge.

== Diplomatic career ==
Jones Parry joined the Foreign and Commonwealth Office in 1973 and his first posting was to the British High Commission in Ottawa as First Secretary (1974–79). He returned to the FCO to work in the European Community Department (Internal) for the period 1979–82. Following this he entered the Office of UK Representation to the European Community in Brussels as First Secretary (Energy) and then (Institutions) 1982–86. He followed this with a period as Deputy Head at the Office of the President of the European Parliament (1987–89), before again returning to the FCO as Head of European Community Department (External) (1989–93). His next overseas position was as Minister at the British Embassy in Madrid (1993–97), followed by the post of Deputy Political Director in the Foreign Office, where he was also responsible for Balkans and Aegean policy (1996–97).

His next position in 1997 was Director European Union during the 1998 United Kingdom Presidency of the Council of the European Union, with overall responsibility for policy, co-ordination and organisation of the presidency. From July 1998 until August 2001 he was the FCO Political Director.

He took over as Permanent Representative to NATO in September 2001, and held the position until 2003, whereupon he became the Permanent Representative of the UK on the United Nations Security Council in New York.

In 2007 he was appointed Chairman of the All Wales Convention – a body established by the Welsh Assembly Government to review Wales's constitutional arrangements and in particular to spearhead the campaign to increase the powers of the Assembly to a full legislative parliament similar to the Scottish Parliament.

In July 2007, it was announced that Jones Parry would be appointed president of Aberystwyth University, succeeding Lord Elystan Morgan on 1 January 2008. From August 2015 to December 2017 he was the first chancellor of the university. In September 2010 he was appointed Chairman of the Trustees of the Wales Millennium Centre. In May 2014 Jones Parry was elected President of the Learned Society of Wales.

Since January 2008 he has been Chairman of Redress, a human rights organization based in London. From March 2008 until July 2011, Jones Parry was Chair of the Open University Business School's International Advisory board, tasked with supporting the global development of the school.

In 2009 Jones Parry was nominated by the United Kingdom as the High Representative for Bosnia and Herzegovina, according to Wikileaks cables, He never took up the position.

== Private life ==
Sir Emyr is married to Lady Jones Parry (Lynn); the couple have two children.

Emyr Jones Parry was promoted from a Knight Commander of the Order of St Michael and St George (KCMG) to a Knight Grand Cross of the Order of St Michael and St George (GCMG) in the Queen's Birthday Honours List of June 2007. Sir Emyr is a keen supporter of Glamorgan County Cricket Club and Swansea City Association Football Club. He was also made an honorary fellow of Cardiff University in 2003, of Aberystwyth University in 2006, and of St Catharine's College, Cambridge in 2008, and is an honorary LL.D of the University of Wales.

== Offices held ==
Diplomatic posts
| Preceded by David Manning | UK Permanent Representative on the North Atlantic Council; 2001–2003 | Succeeded by Peter Ricketts |
| Preceded by Jeremy Greenstock | UK Permanent Representative to the United Nations; 2003–2007 | Succeeded by John Sawers |
Academic offices
| Preceded by Elystan Morgan | President of Aberystwyth University; 2008–2017 | Succeeded by John Thomas |

== Sources ==
1. http://www.aber.ac.uk/aberonline/en/archive/2007/07/uwa8107/ 2. https://web.archive.org/web/20121002150614/http://www.cardiff.ac.uk/about/fellows/previous/index.html
