= Sarah MacIntosh =

British diplomat

Her Excellency Dame Sarah MacIntosh DCMG
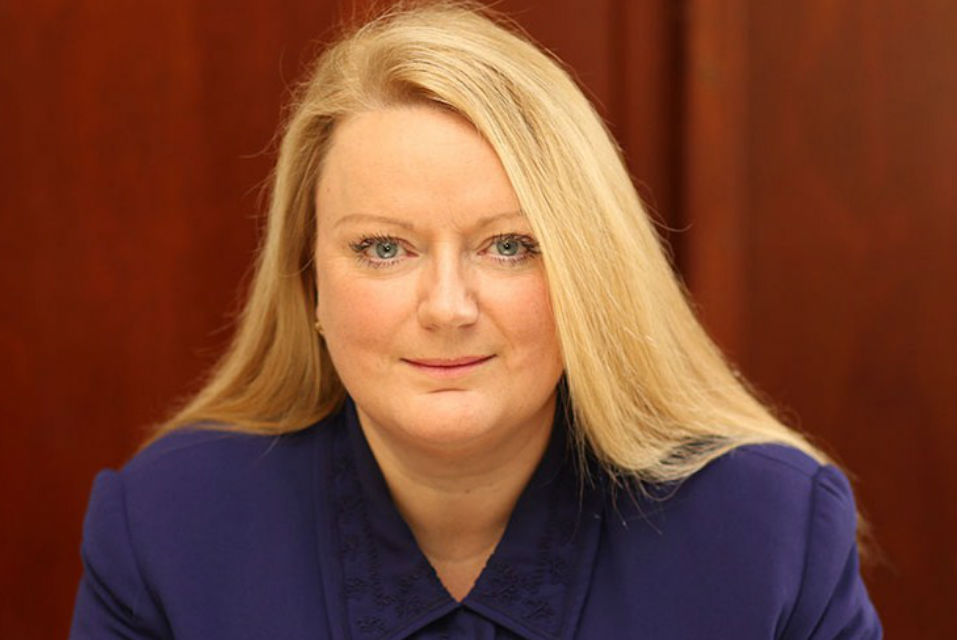

Permanent Representative of the United Kingdom to the United Nations
- Incumbent
- Assumed office 29 July 2026
- Monarch: Charles III
- Prime Minister: Andy Burnham
- Preceded by: Dame Barbara Woodward (Note: Office vacant from 3 October 2025 to 29 July 2026)

High Commissioner of the United Kingdom to Australia
- In office 2025–2026
- Monarch: Charles III
- Prime Minister: Keir Starmer; Andy Burnham
- Preceded by: Victoria Treadell

Deputy National Security Adviser and Prime Minister’s Adviser on Foreign Affairs
- In office 2022–2024
- Monarchs: Elizabeth II; Charles III
- Prime Minister: Boris Johnson; Liz Truss; Rishi Sunak; Keir Starmer
- Preceded by: Sir David Quarrey (Deputy National Security Adviser and Prime Minister’s Adviser on International Affairs)

Permanent Representative of the United Kingdom to NATO
- In office 2017–2022
- Monarch: Elizabeth II
- Prime Minister: Theresa May; Boris Johnson
- Preceded by: Paul Johnston (acting)
- Succeeded by: David Quarrey

British High Commissioner to Sierra Leone British Ambassador to Liberia
- In office 2006–2008
- Monarch: Elizabeth II
- Prime Minister: Tony Blair; Gordon Brown
- Preceded by: John Mitchiner
- Succeeded by: Ian Hughes

Personal details
- Born: 7 August 1969 (age 57)

Dame Sarah MacIntosh DCMG (born 7 August 1969) is a British diplomat who has served as the United Kingdom's Permanent Representative to the United Nations since 2026. Her previous roles include High Commissioner to Australia and Sierra Leone, ambassador to Liberia and NATO and Deputy National Security Adviser.

== Career ==
Having joined the Foreign and Commonwealth Office (FCO) in 1991, MacIntosh's early postings included the International Atomic Energy Agency in Vienna, the British embassy in Madrid and the United Nations in New York. She was a strategy coordinator for the United Nations Interim Administration Mission in Kosovo from 2004 to 2005 before being appointed High Commissioner to Sierra Leone (and non-resident ambassador to Liberia) from 2006 to 2008. After taking a fellowship at the Weatherhead Center for International Affairs at Harvard University from 2008 to 2009, she held managerial roles at the FCO from 2009 to 2016, including director of strategic finance, director of defence and international security and director-general of defence and intelligence.

MacIntosh served as the British ambassador to NATO from 2017 to 2022, then as Deputy National Security Adviser and prime ministerial adviser on foreign affairs from 2022 to 2024.

In 2026, she was appointed as the United Kingdom's Permanent Representative to the United Nations, and presented her credentials to the Deputy Secretary-General of the United Nations, Amina J. Mohammed, on 29 July 2026.

== Honours ==
Previously a Companion of the Order of St Michael and St George (CMG), MacIntosh was made a Dame Commander of the Order of St Michael and St George (DCMG) in the 2020 Birthday Honours for services to British foreign policy.

== Notes ==
Diplomatic posts
Preceded by John Mitchiner	British High Commissioner to Sierra Leone; 2006–2008	Succeeded by Ian Hughes
Preceded by John Mitchiner	British Ambassador to Liberia (non-resident); 2006–2008	Succeeded by Ian Hughes
Preceded by Sir Adam Thomson	British Permanent Representative to NATO; 2017–present	Incumbent
