= Richard Thomas (Royal Navy officer) =

Royal Navy Admiral and former Black Rod (1932–1998)

Admiral Sir Richard Thomas KCB KCVO OBE

Gentleman Usher of the Black Rod
- In office January 1992 – 8 May 1995
- Monarch: Elizabeth II
- Preceded by: Sir John Gingell
- Succeeded by: Sir Edward Jones

Personal details
- Born: William Richard Scott Thomas; 22 March 1932 Rhyl, Wales
- Died: 13 December 1998 (aged 66)
- Spouse: Paddy Cullinan

Military service
- Allegiance: United Kingdom
- Branch/service: Royal Navy
- Years of service: 1951–1992
- Rank: Admiral
- Commands: Second Flotilla; HMS Fearless; HMS Troubridge
- Battles/wars: Cod Wars
- Awards: Knight Commander of the Order of the Bath; Knight Commander of the Royal Victorian Order; Officer of the Order of the British Empire

Admiral Sir William Richard Scott Thomas, KCB, KCVO, OBE (22 March 1932 – 13 December 1998) was a senior Royal Navy officer and the Gentleman Usher of the Black Rod (or simply Black Rod) in the British Parliament's House of Lords from January 1992 to 8 May 1995.

== Naval career ==
Educated at Downside School, Thomas joined the Royal Navy in 1951. He was given command of the destroyer HMS Troubridge in 1966. He went on to be Staff Officer Operations to the Flag Officer, Scotland and Northern Ireland and saw action in the Second Cod War in 1972. Promoted to captain, he took part in Polaris development at the Ministry of Defence before being given command of the assault ship HMS Fearless. He went on to be Director of Seaman Officers' Appointments in 1982, Naval Secretary in 1983 and Flag Officer, Second Flotilla in 1985. Promoted to vice admiral, he became Deputy Supreme Allied Commander Atlantic at Norfolk, Virginia, in 1987 and the UK Military Representative to NATO from 1989 to 1992, when he retired from the Royal Navy.

In retirement Thomas became Gentleman Usher of the Black Rod. Amongst other honours, he was awarded a papal knighthood in the Order of Pope Pius IX.

== Family ==
Thomas was born on 22 March 1932 in Rhyl, Wales, the son of Mary Hilda Bertha "Maimie" (née Hemelryk) and Commander William Scott Thomas (who commanded HMS Impulsive during the Second World War) and brother of Lieutenant Commander Simon Scott Thomas. In 1959, he married Paddy Cullinan; they had 8 children. He was the uncle of actresses Kristin Scott Thomas and Serena Scott Thomas (the "Scott" portion of their last names coming from another British naval officer, Captain Robert F. Scott, the ill-fated explorer of the South Pole).

Military offices
Preceded by Richard Fitch	Naval Secretary; 1983–1985	Succeeded by Roger Dimmock
Preceded by Sir Geoffrey Dalton	Deputy Supreme Allied Commander Atlantic; 1987–1989	Succeeded by Sir James Weatherall
Preceded by Sir Michael Knight	UK Military Representative to NATO; 1989–1992	Succeeded by Sir Edward Jones
Government offices
Preceded by Sir John Gingell	Black Rod; 1992–1995	Succeeded by Sir Edward Jones
