= List of permanent representatives of the United Kingdom to NATO =

His Britannic Majesty's Permanent Representative to the North Atlantic Council
- Flag of NATO

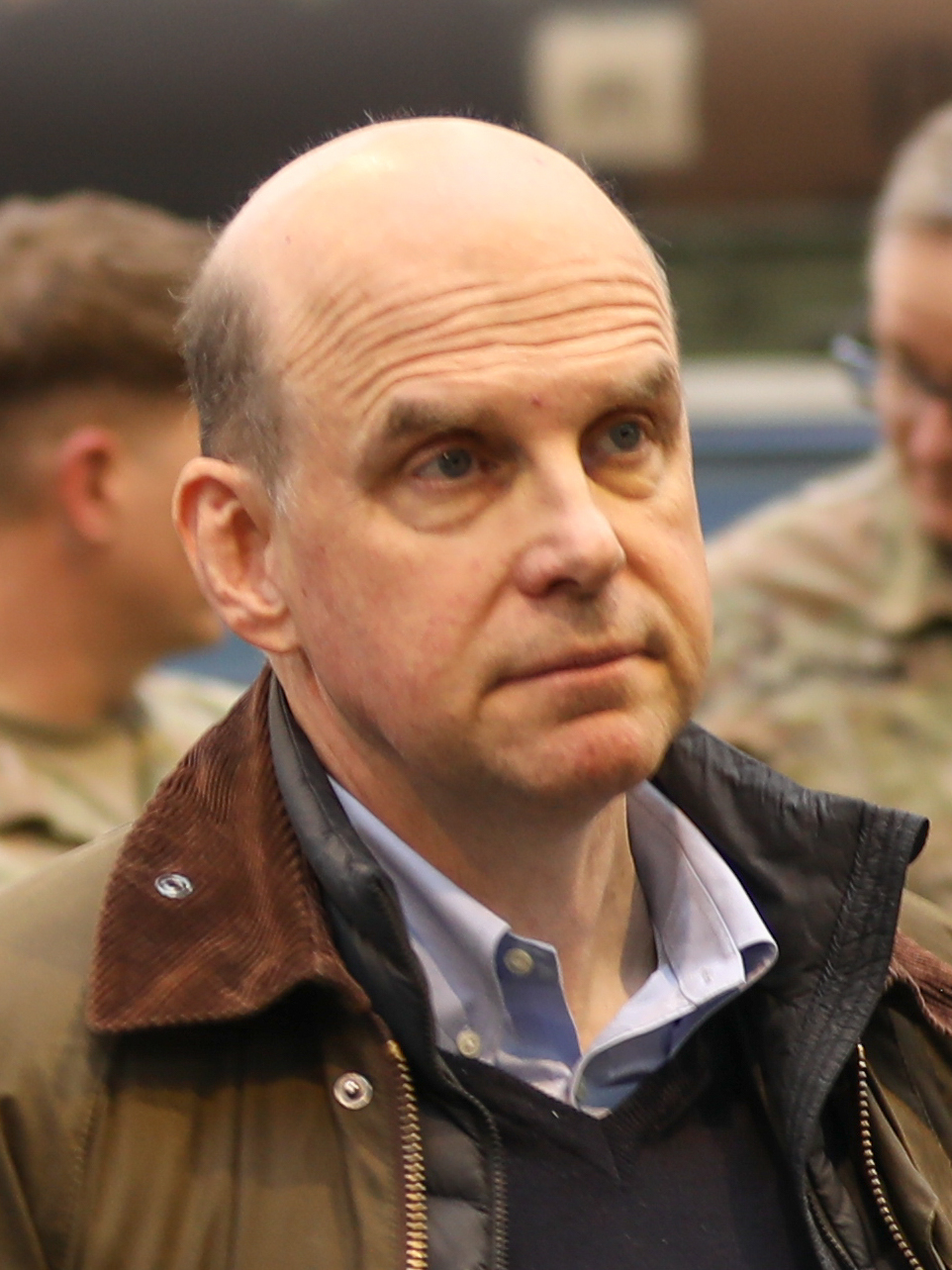
- Incumbent; Angus Lapsley since April 2025
- Style: His Excellency
- Member of: North Atlantic Council
- Reports to: Secretary of State for Foreign, Commonwealth and Development Affairs; North Atlantic Council
- Appointer: King Charles III as Sovereign
- Website: UK Joint Delegation to NATO

The permanent representative to the North Atlantic Council is the senior member of the United Kingdom's delegation to the North Atlantic Treaty Organization.

== Permanent representatives to the North Atlantic Council ==
- 1952–1953: Sir Frederick Hoyer Millar
- 1953–1957: Sir Christopher Steel
- 1957–1960: Sir Frank Roberts
- 1960–1962: Sir Paul Mason
- 1962–1966: Sir Evelyn Shuckburgh
- 1966–1970: Sir Bernard Burrows
- 1970–1975: Sir Edward Peck
- 1975–1979: Sir John Killick
- 1979–1982: Sir Clive Rose
- 1982–1986: Sir John Graham
- 1986–1992: Sir Michael Alexander
- 1992–1995: Sir John Weston
- 1995–2001: Sir John Goulden
- 2001: Sir David Manning
- 2001–2003: Sir Emyr Jones Parry
- 2003–2006: Sir Peter Ricketts
- 2006–2010: Sir Stewart Eldon
- 2010–2014: Dame Mariot Leslie
- 2014–2016: Sir Adam Thomson
- 2016–2017: Paul Johnston (acting)
- 2017–2022: Dame Sarah MacIntosh
- 2022–2025: Sir David Quarrey
- 2025–present: Angus Lapsley

== Military representatives to NATO ==
UK Military Representative, NATO Military Committee
- Car flag of the UK Military Representative, NATO Military Committee

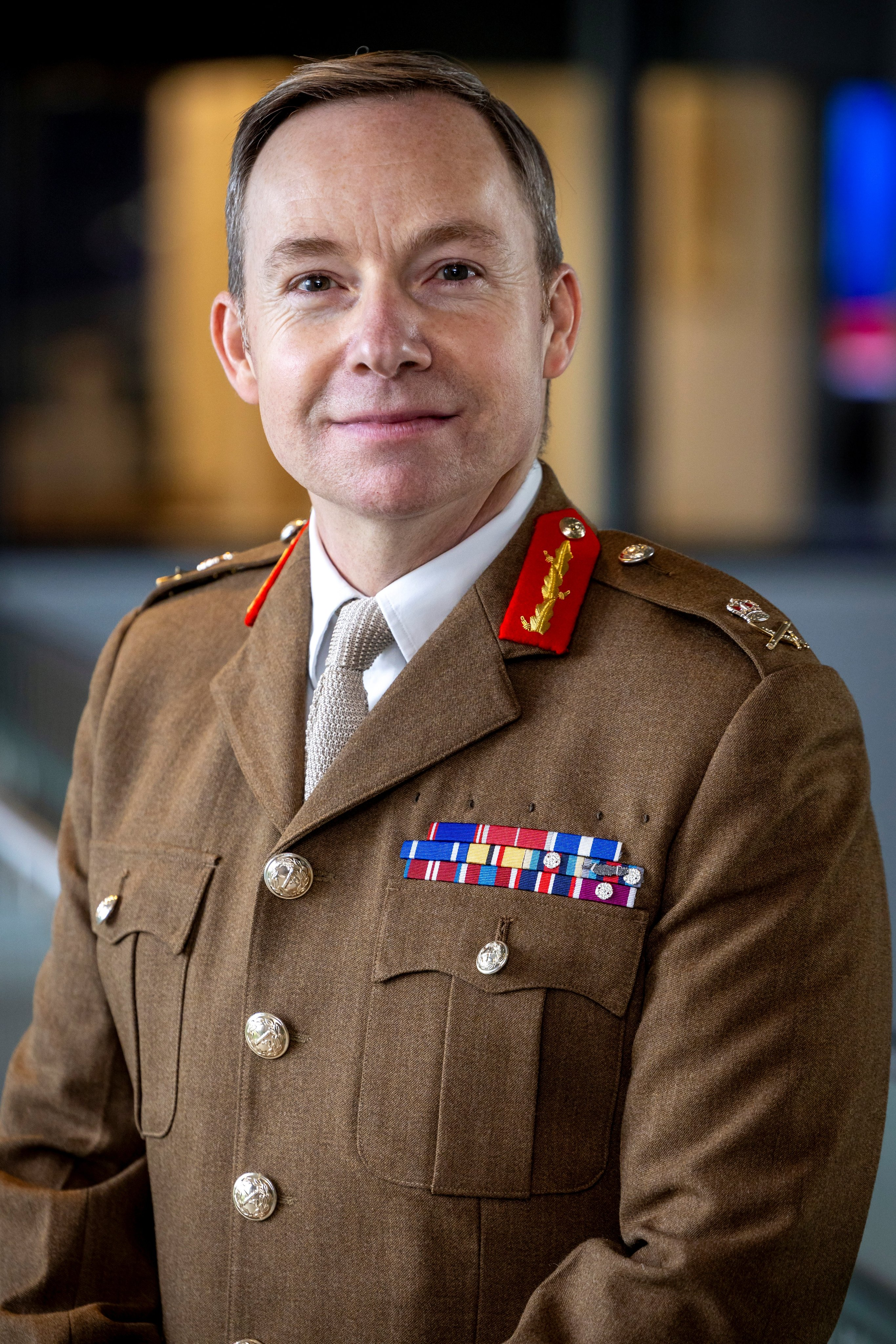
- Incumbent; Eldon Millar since 2026
- First holder: William Elliot

Military representatives have included:

Military Representatives to NATO
Image	Rank	Name	Term began	Term ended
	Air Chief Marshal	Sir William Elliot	1951	1953
	General	Sir John Whiteley	1953	1956
	Admiral	Sir Michael Denny	1956	1959
	Air Chief Marshal	Sir George Mills	1959	1962
	General	Sir Michael West	1962	1965
	Admiral	Sir Nigel Henderson	1965	1968
	Air Chief Marshal	Sir David Lee	1968	1971
	General	Sir Victor FitzGeorge-Balfour	1971	1973
	Admiral	Sir Rae McKaig	1973	1975
	General	Sir David Fraser	1975	1977
	Air Chief Marshal	Sir Alasdair Steedman	1977	1980
	Admiral	Sir Anthony Morton	1980	1983
	General	Sir Thomas Morony	1983	1986
	Air Chief Marshal	Sir Michael Knight	1986	1989
	Admiral	Sir Richard Thomas	1989	1992
	General	Sir Edward Jones	1992	1995
	Air Marshal	Sir John Cheshire	1995	1997
	Vice Admiral	Sir Paul Haddacks	1997	2000
	Lieutenant General	Sir Michael Willcocks	2000	2001
	Lieutenant General	Sir Kevin O'Donoghue	2001	2002
	Air Marshal	SIr Robert Wright	2002	2006
	Vice Admiral	Sir Anthony Dymock	2006	2008
	Lieutenant General	Sir David Bill	2008	2011
	Air Marshal	Sir Christopher Harper	2011	2013
	Vice Admiral	Sir Ian Corder	2013	2016
	Lieutenant General	Sir George Norton	2016	2020
	Lieutenant General	Sir Ben Bathurst (Note: position merged with the role of military representative to the European Union.)	2020	2023
	Lieutenant General	Sir Ian Cave	2023	2026
	Lieutenant General	Eldon Millar	2026	present
