= John Weston (diplomat) =

British diplomat

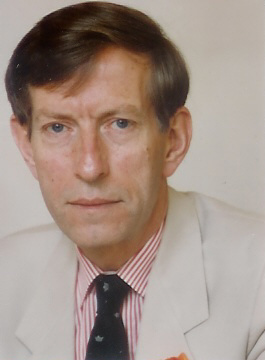
Sir John Weston

Sir (Philip) John Weston KCMG (born 13 April 1938) is a retired British diplomat. He was the UK Permanent Representative on the North Atlantic Council (NATO) from 1992 to 1995, and the British Permanent Representative to the United Nations (UN) from 1995 to 1998.

== Early life ==
Weston was educated at Sherborne School and Worcester College, Oxford, taking a double first in Classics and Philosophy. He carried out his National Service as a Second Lieutenant in 42 Commando Royal Marines.

== Diplomatic career ==
Weston joined the Diplomatic Service in 1962, and was posted to Hong Kong (Chinese language student); and subsequently to Beijing, to Brussels EC (with the UK Permanent Representation to the European Community) and to Washington DC. Whilst working for the Foreign Office in London, he covered matters relating to the European Community, Eastern Europe and intelligence, and served as a Private Secretary to the Foreign Secretary, both James Callaghan and Anthony Crosland. In 1977, he spent a sabbatical year as a visiting fellow at All Souls College, Oxford.

From 1981 to 1985 he was the Foreign Office's Director of International Security Policy, after heading their Defence Department during the Falklands War. He was then posted overseas, as Deputy Ambassador and Minister Plenipotentiary in Paris, from 1985 to 1988. On his return to London, he worked as Deputy Secretary to the Cabinet and as Political Director at the Foreign Office. In 1990, he was the British official negotiator on the Treaty on the Final Settlement with Respect to Germany (for which he received the German Order of Merit, with Star).

In 1992 Weston was made a Knight Commander of the Order of St Michael and St George (KCMG), and appointed the Permanent Representative on NATO for the UK. He held this position until he was made the British Permanent Representative to the United Nations (UN) in 1995. He retired from this post, and from the diplomatic service, in 1998.

John Weston was a Non-executive Director on the Boards of several companies including British Telecom 1998–2001, and Rolls-Royce Group plc 1998–2005. He also became a trustee of the American Associates of the Royal Academy of Arts, and of the National Portrait Gallery. In 2003, he was made an Honorary Fellow of Worcester College, Oxford, where he was also President of the Worcester College Society for ten years. He chaired the Board of Governors at Sherborne School 2001–2007, was a governor of the Ditchley Foundation, and also for 10 years Honorary President of Community Foundation Network, a UK-wide charity encouraging creation of local endowment funds to support local works.

Weston began writing poetry in 2002, appearing in many magazines and journals. He was published in the Take Five '04 anthology by Shoestring Press in 2004. The first collection of his poetry, Chasing the Hoopoe, published by Peterloo Poets in August 2005, was described by Harold Pinter as "a good read, full of salt and pepper". For 4 years he chaired the trustees of The Poetry School and was a trustee of The Poetry Society. His second collection of poems "Echo Soundings" was published by Shoestring Press in 2012. Weston is married to Sally (née Ehlers). They have three children and seven grandchildren.

== Offices held ==
Diplomatic posts
Preceded by Michael Alexander	UK Permanent Representative on the North Atlantic Council; 1992–1995	Succeeded by John Goulden
Preceded by David Hannay	UK Permanent Representative to the United Nations; 1995–1998	Succeeded by Jeremy Greenstock
