= Matt Baugh =

British diplomat

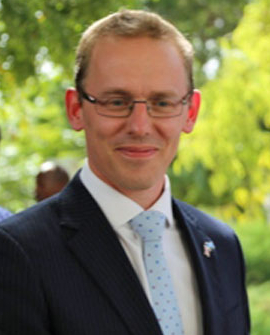

United Kingdom High Commissioner to the Republic of Kenya
- In office 6 June 2026 – Present
- Preceded by: Neil Wigan

Matt Baugh OBE (born 24 July 1973) is a British diplomat who was ambassador to Somalia, the first for 20 years. He is the current High Commissioner to the republic of Kenya.

== Career ==
Baugh was educated at The Oratory School and Bristol University. After graduating BA in history and MSc in international policy, he joined the British civil service in the Department for International Development (DFID). After various posts he was head of the Post-Conflict Reconstruction Unit (now the Stabilisation Unit) 2005–06, head of DFID's Iraq department 2006–07, and Principal Private Secretary to the Secretary of State for International Development (Douglas Alexander) 2008–09.

Baugh was DFID's representative for Somalia 2010–11, and in February 2012 he was appointed the UK's Ambassador to Somalia, the first to serve in over twenty years. Baugh initially worked out of the British diplomatic office in Nairobi. On 25 April 2013, he re-located to Mogadishu, as the UK diplomatic mission for Somalia officially re-opened its embassy in the Somali capital. On 6 June 2013, Baugh was succeeded by Neil Wigan as the British ambassador to Somalia; Baugh was appointed OBE in the 2013 Birthday Honours "for services to promoting peace and security in Somalia " and transferred to be head of the Africa department (Central and Southern) at the Foreign and Commonwealth Office in London, before being transferred to become the head of East and West Africa Department. On 6 April 2026 he was officially announced as High Commissioner to the Republic of Kenya.
