= Kate Foster (diplomat) =

British diplomat

Kate Foster OBE
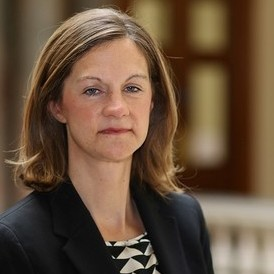

British Ambassador to Somalia
- In office 2021–2023
- Monarchs: Elizabeth II; Charles III
- Prime Minister: Boris Johnson; Liz Truss; Rishi Sunak
- Preceded by: Ben Fender
- Succeeded by: Michael Nithavrianakis

Kate Foster OBE is a British diplomat. In 2021, she became the United Kingdom's ambassador to Somalia, where she served in post until 2023. She is currently UK Deputy Permanent Representative to the UN.

== Life ==
From 1999 to 2004, she was employed by private companies before she joined UNHCR working in Liberia and Sierra Leone supporting youth work with refugees. In 2006, she left to work for the International Rescue Committee, and by 2011 she was working for the charity Save the Children where she was a Programme Director with an interest in South Sudan. She also worked for the International Rescue Committee across Africa.

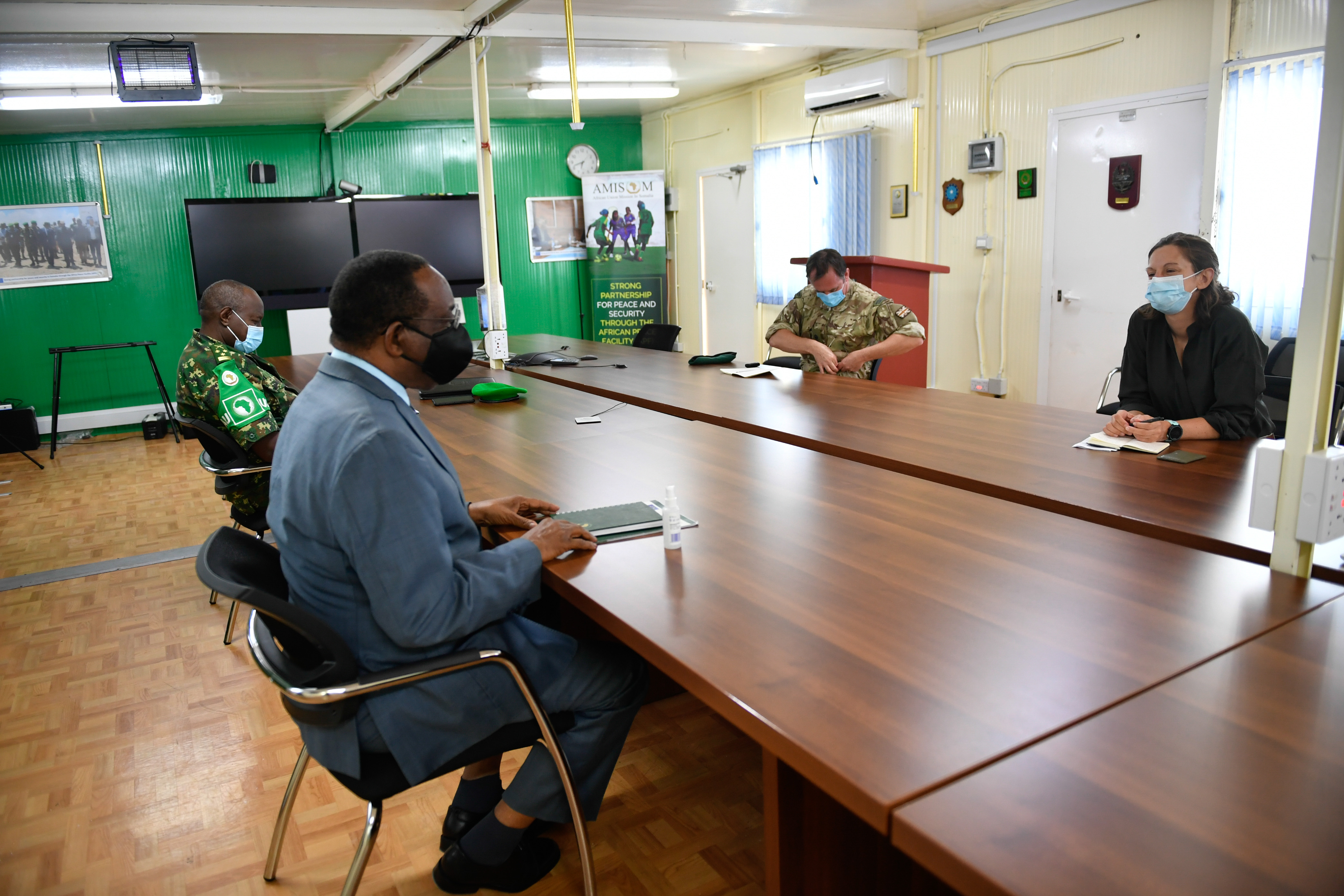
Foster meeting the Special Representative of the Chairperson of the African Union Commission for Somalia, Francisco Madeira, and the AMISOM Commander, Lt. Gen. Diomede Ndegeya in 2021

In 2014–15, she led the United Kingdom's response to the Ebola outbreak in Africa as their Director of Operations. She returned to work for the Department for International Development leading work in Africa and Yemen in particular.

Foster became the British Ambassador to Somalia taking over from Ben Fender; the changeover was in February 2021 and the job was seen as "sensitive" given the disputes in the region.

The UK has had a strong link to Somalia with £325 m. of funding budgeted between 2018 and 2022. She has been asked about the withdrawal of the African Union Mission to Somalia (AMISOM) as comparisons have been made with the withdrawal of troops from Afghanistan. Foster was the ambassador based in Mogadishu but there are no consular services. British nationals who needed this type of support in either Somalia or Somalialand were instructed to contact the British High Commission in Nairobi. At the end of 2021, she was having discussions with Galmudug President Ahmed Abdikadir Qoorqoor at a time when the national elections were delayed and the American government was threatening to retaliate against anyone who was preventing the country's transition to peace.
