= Jeremy Varcoe =

British judge and diplomat

Jeremy Richard Levering Grosvenor Varcoe, CMG (born 20 September 1937) is a former British diplomat, who also served as an Immigration Tribunal Appeal judge.

== Education ==
Jeremy Varcoe was educated at Charterhouse School in Surrey, and at Lincoln College, Oxford. He served in HM Forces 1956-58 and in HMOCS (Swaziland) 1962–65. He was called to the Bar, Gray's Inn in 1966.

== Diplomatic career ==
Varcoe joined the FCO as First Secretary in 1970. He was seconded as Deputy Secretary-General to the Pearce Commission on Rhodesian Opinion in 1972. Later that year, he was posted to Ankara. In 1974, he was posted to Lusaka as Head of Chancery, returning to London in 1978. He was appointed Counsellor at Kuala Lumpur in 1979. Jeremy Varcoe was appointed Head of the FCO's Southern African Department in 1982. Following the Coventry Four affair in March 1984, he was sent as Counsellor to Ankara. Varcoe was seconded to Standard Chartered Bank in 1985.

Subsequently, Varcoe was appointed Ambassador to Somalia in 1987. He coordinated the 17th G8 summit at Lancaster House in 1991, and later served as Assistant Under-Secretary of State at the FCO until he retired in 1997. He was appointed a Companion of the Order of St Michael and St George (CMG) in the 1989 Birthday Honours.

== Post-retirement ==
In 2004, Jeremy Varcoe was one of 50 former ambassadors who signed a letter to Tony Blair urging him to distance Britain from US policy in the Middle East. He became an Immigration Appeals Tribunal judge in 1998 but was forced to retire in 2007 at the age of 70. Varcoe then sued the Ministry of Justice for discriminating against him on account of his age.

== Family ==
He married Wendy Anne Moss in 1961. They had two daughters (1964 and 1966).
