= Israel–United Kingdom relations =

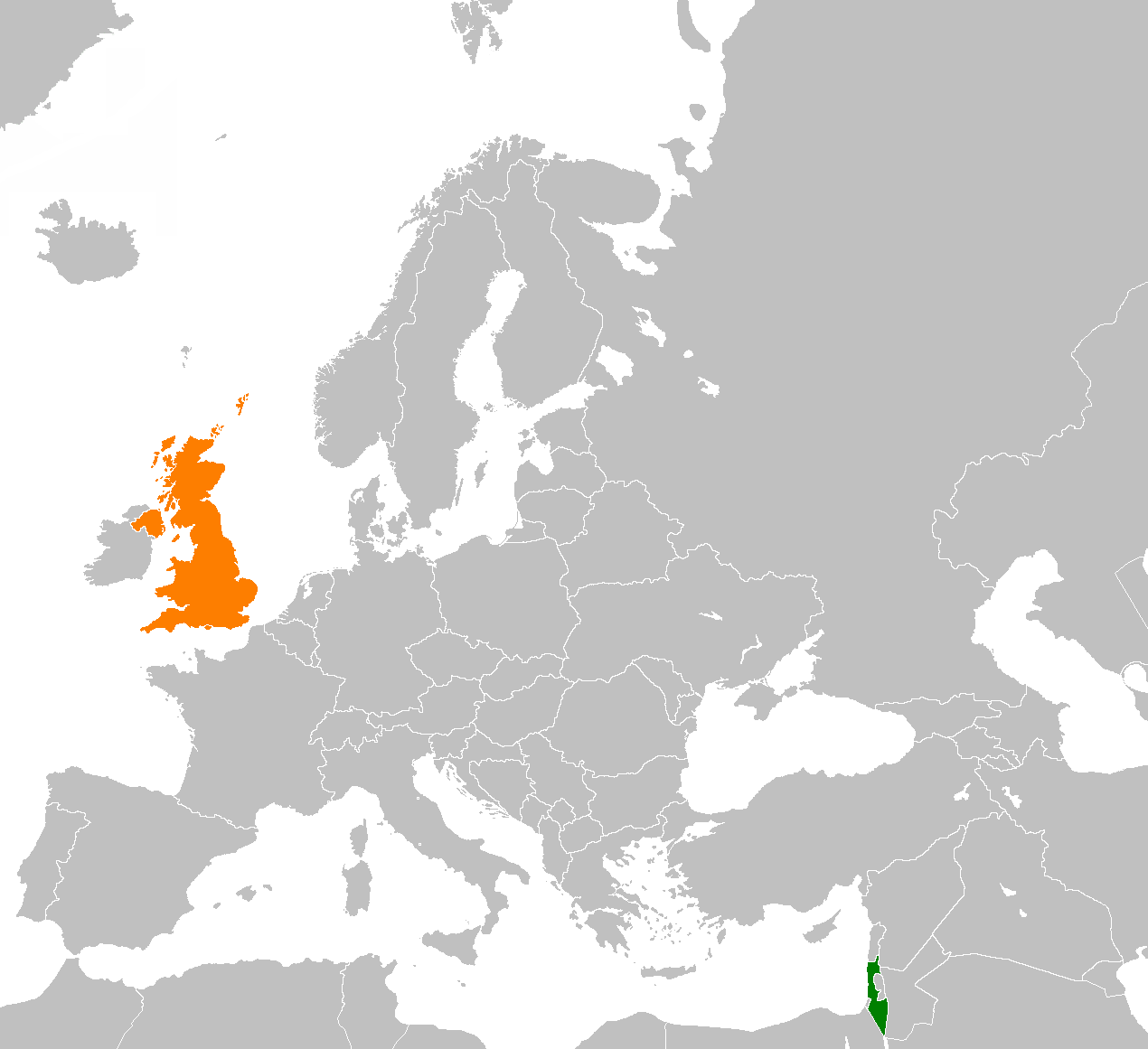

- Israel: United Kingdom

Diplomatic mission
- Israeli Embassy, London: British Embassy, Tel Aviv

Envoy
- Ambassadorship vacant: Ambassador Simon Walters

Israel and the United Kingdom share diplomatic and commercial ties. The British embassy to Israel is located in Tel Aviv. The UK has an honorary consul in Eilat and a non-accredited consulate-general in Jerusalem, that represents the United Kingdom in that city and the Palestinian territories. Israel has three representative offices in the United Kingdom: an embassy located in London and consulates in Cardiff and Glasgow. As of 2023, trade exceeded £6.1 billion (US$8.36 billion). Israel and the UK engage together in scientific research, defence and the development of new technologies, with the UK seeking to tap into Israel's considerable high technology sector through local British initiatives. The UK since 2011 has sought to partner British companies with Israeli advanced technology companies. The UK Israeli cooperation has generated £1.2 billion as well as 16,000 British jobs of 250 such partnerships. The United Kingdom and Israel are currently negotiating renewing a free trade agreement.

== History ==
=== Anglo-Yishuv relations (1914–48) ===
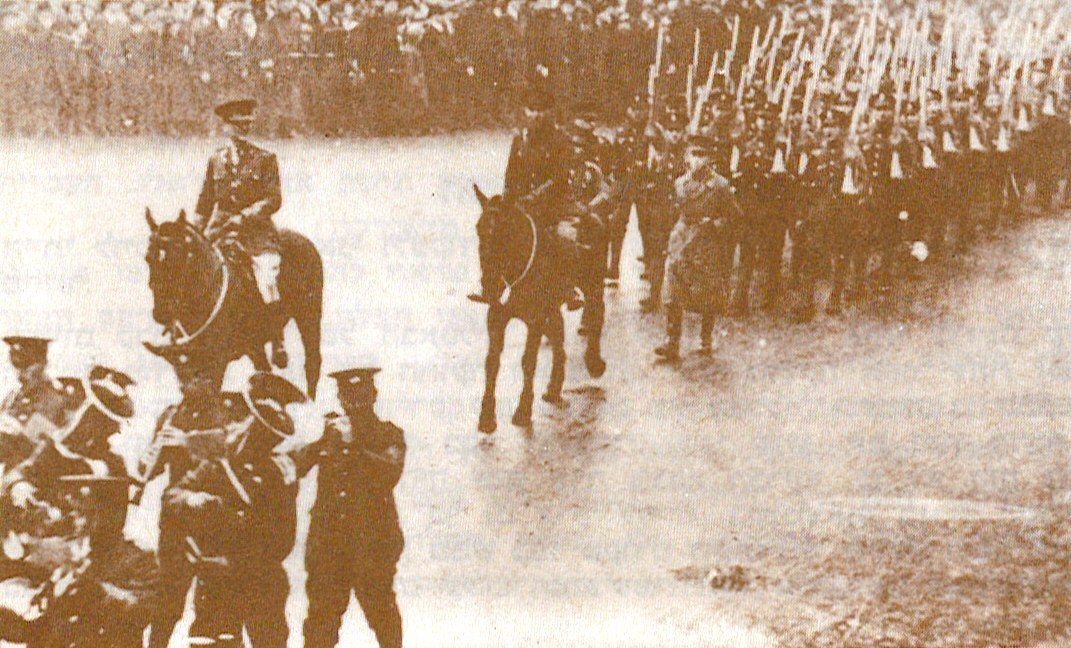
38th battalion of the Jewish Legion marching in London, 1918

Britain seized Palestine from the Ottoman Empire during the Sinai and Palestine Campaign in World War I. Close cooperation between Britain and the Yishuv, the nascent pre-state Jewish community in Palestine, developed during this time, when Britain received intelligence from the Nili Jewish spy network, which assisted British forces in conquering Palestine. Additionally, over 5000 Jews from various countries served in the Jewish Legion of the British Army which fought at Gallipoli and in the Palestine Campaign, although some Palestinian Jews also served in the Ottoman Army. In 1917, Britain issued the pro-Zionist Balfour Declaration, which called for the establishment of a national home for the Jewish people in Palestine. Six weeks afterward, British troops concluded the Palestine campaign, driving out the Ottoman army from Jerusalem, under the leadership of Field Marshal Allenby. The British then took control of Palestine. In 1920, Britain established its authority under the Mandate for Palestine granted by the League of Nations, which was confirmed in the San Remo Agreement of 1922. A High Commissioner was appointed with instructions to allow the Jews to build their national home, and spent 31 years in charge of British Mandate Palestine under a League of Nations mandate that originally extended to both sides of the Jordan River. In 1921, Colonial Secretary Winston Churchill visited the Jewish community and endorsed the fulfillment of long-standing Jewish aspirations to the land. In 1922, he separated Transjordan from the mandate, reconstituting it as an emirate ruled by the Hashemites. He also issued the White Paper of 1922, reaffirming Britain's commitment to the Balfour Declaration while stipulating that Jewish immigration be limited by the country's economic absorptive capacity.

Following the 1920 Nebi Musa riots, the Yishuv's leadership created the Haganah, a nationwide defense organization. During the 1936–1939 Arab revolt in Palestine, the Haganah actively assisted the British Army, which in turn financed a Haganah-controlled Jewish police force known as Notrim. The crushing of the revolt decisively tipped the balance of power in Palestine in favor of the Yishuv. However, Britain also recognized a need to avoid antagonizing the wider Arab world. In 1937, the Peel Commission presented a plan for a Jewish state and an Arab state. After this was rejected, the British District Commissioner for the Galilee, Lewis Yelland Andrews was assassinated by Arab gunmen in Nazareth. In 1939, Britain announced the White Paper of 1939, which greatly restricted Jewish immigration and land purchases and called for a single unitary state in Palestine. In response to the White Paper, Jewish paramilitary group Irgun (an offshoot from the Haganah) began to carry out operations against the British.

World War II necessitated cooperation between Britain and the Jewish paramilitaries in Palestine. The Irgun halted its operations against the British and opted for temporary cooperation, including a mission to assist the British in the Anglo-Iraqi War. To prepare for a possible Axis invasion of Palestine, Britain assisted the Haganah in the creation of Palmach, a commando section specialized in sabotage and guerilla warfare. Members of Palmach fought alongside the British in the Syria–Lebanon campaign. Following the Second Battle of El Alamein, Britain withdrew its support for the Palmach and tried to disarm it, resulting in the Palmach going underground. In 1944, Britain created the Jewish Brigade, a military formation consisting of Yishuv volunteers, which fought in the Italian campaign. 30,000 Palestinian Jews ended up serving in the British army during the war.

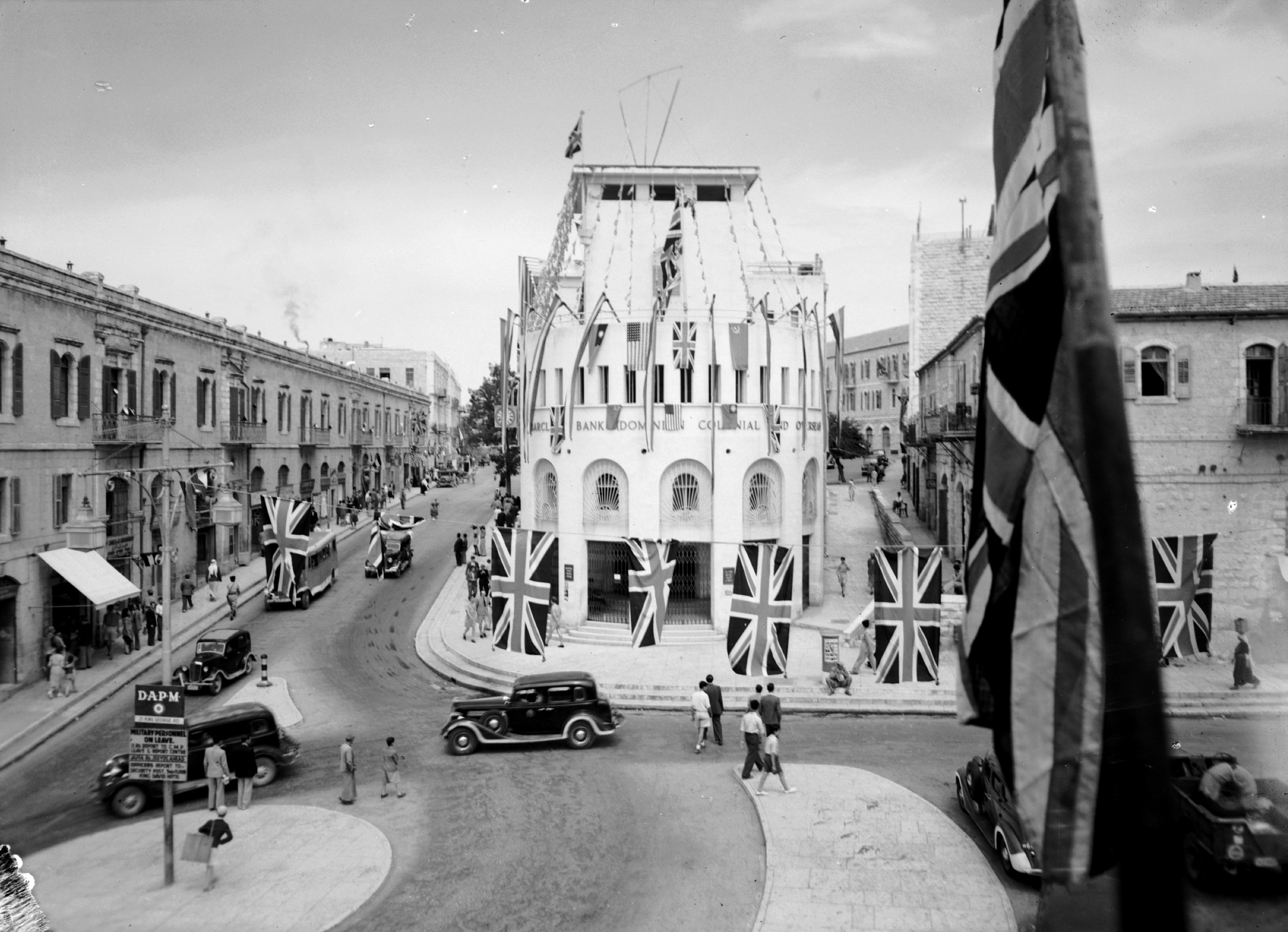
Jerusalem, Mandatory Palestine on VE Day, 8 May 1945

With World War II nearing an end, the Irgun renewed its campaign against the British. From 1944 and onwards, the British faced a growing Jewish insurgency in Palestine. 784 British soldiers and civilians were killed in the insurgency. The army's failure to defeat the insurgents convinced the British government that Palestine was a lost cause, and directly led to its decision to withdraw from the territory. In February 1947, the British government – having already decided to withdraw from India – announced it was handing the mandate back to the League of Nations. The British mandate was relinquished and the establishment of the State of Israel was affirmed by a United Nations General Assembly resolution. The conflict with the insurgents continued until the last British soldier left Palestine; at the end of April 1948, British forces fought a small battle against Zionist militias near Jaffa, temporarily preventing a Jewish takeover of the city, while failing to expel the militias from Menashiya.

=== Israel independence period (1948–1950) ===
Relations between Israel and Britain were hostile during the 1948 Arab–Israeli War, at one point bringing the two countries to the edge of direct military confrontation. Britain, which had military forces in Egypt and Transjordan and defense agreements with both nations, foresaw possible military intervention on their behalf. Early in the war, a Royal Air Force base in Amman was hit during an Israeli raid on the city. The British threatened to attack the Israeli Air Force if such an action was repeated. During the battles in Sinai, the Royal Air Force conducted almost daily reconnaissance missions over Israel and the Sinai. RAF reconnaissance aircraft took off from Egyptian airbases and sometimes flew alongside Royal Egyptian Air Force planes, and high-flying British aircraft frequently flew over Haifa and Ramat David Airbase. The British government planned military action against Israel codenamed Operation Clatter in the event of an Israeli invasion of Egypt and the flights were deployed to discover the strength of the Israeli Air Force and locate its forward bases.

On 20 November 1948, an unarmed RAF photo-reconnaissance de Havilland Mosquito was shot down by an Israeli Air Force P-51 Mustang. On 7 January 1949, four British Spitfire FR18s flew over an Israeli convoy that had been attacked by five Egyptian Spitfires fifteen minutes earlier. Fearing an imminent attack, Israeli ground troops opened fire on the British Spitfires, and shot down one with a tank-mounted machine gun. The remaining three Spitfires were subsequently shot down by Israeli planes, and two pilots were killed. Two of the surviving pilots were taken to Tel Aviv and interrogated, and were later released. The Israelis dragged the wrecks of the British planes into Israeli territory, but failed to conceal them before they were photographed by British reconnaissance planes. In response, the Royal Air Force readied its planes to bomb Israeli airfields, British troops in the Middle East were placed on high alert with all leave cancelled, and British citizens were advised to leave Israel. Convinced the British would not allow the loss of five aircraft and two pilots go without retaliation, the Israelis were determined to repel any retaliatory airstrike, and made preparations to defend their airbases. However, British commanders defied pressure from the squadrons involved in the incidents, and refused to authorize any strikes. Following a British ultimatum to vacate the Sinai, Israeli forces pulled back. War between Israel and the United Kingdom was thus avoided.

In the aftermath of the 1948–1949 war, Israel and France successfully worked to oppose Anglo-Iraqi plans for an Iraqi takeover of Syria.

=== Relations post 1950 ===
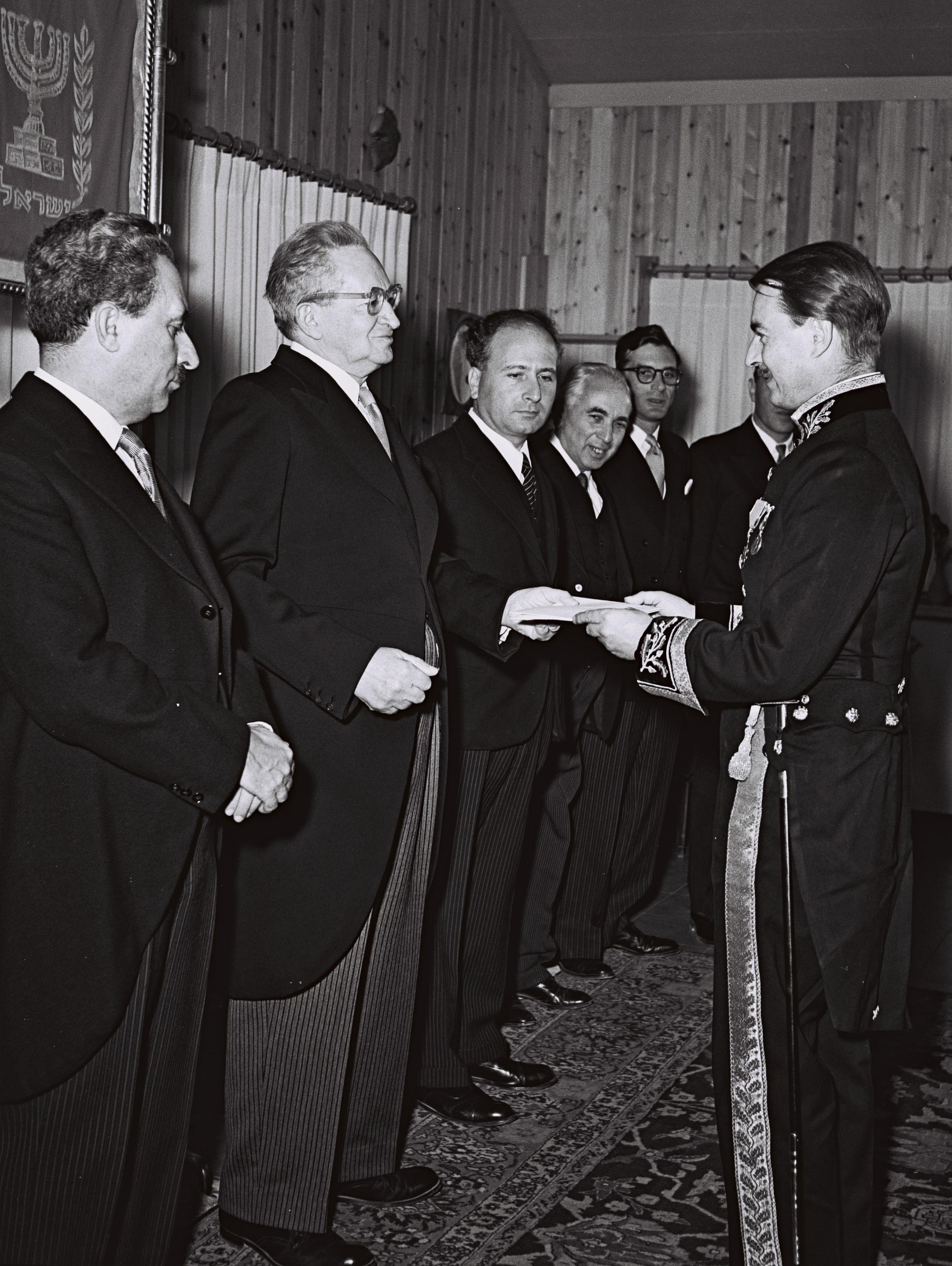
John Nicholls, British ambassador to Israel, presenting his credentials to Yitzhak Ben Zvi, 1954

In 1956, Egypt nationalized the Suez Canal and blocked the Straits of Tiran to ships bound to Israel, whilst encouraging violent terror attacks into Israel via Egyptian-controlled Gaza. Britain and France resolved to secure the Suez Canal by force. Although Israel had its own problems with Egypt and wanted to attack, Britain was hesitant to fight alongside the Israelis, lest the ensuing backlash in the Arab world threaten London's close allies in Baghdad and Amman. In the end, the government of Anthony Eden reluctantly included Israel in the war plans, due to French pressure and the need for a local ally. In November 1956, Israel attacked Egypt, and Britain and France seized most of the Suez Canal before financial and diplomatic intervention by Russia and the United States forced them to halt their advance. This marked the point where Israeli-British relations were at their best.

In 1958, the 14 July Revolution took place in Iraq, resulting in the murder of the King Faisal II and the creation of an Iraqi Republic. Fearing that the same thing could happen in Jordan, King Hussein appealed to Britain to come to his aid. While officially at war with Jordan, Israel shared Britain's interest in keeping Hussein on the throne, and agreed to allow British troops to be flown in through Israeli airspace.

Throughout the 1950s and 1960s, the UK was seen as pro-Arab, maintaining close relations with Jordan and the Gulf states. However, in 1975 the UK voted against the motion in the UN that “Zionism is racism.”

Relations were strained in the 1980s. During the 1982 Lebanon War, Britain imposed an arms embargo on Israel, which were not lifted until 1994. Relations further worsened after Israel supplied weaponry to Argentina during the 1982 Falklands War.

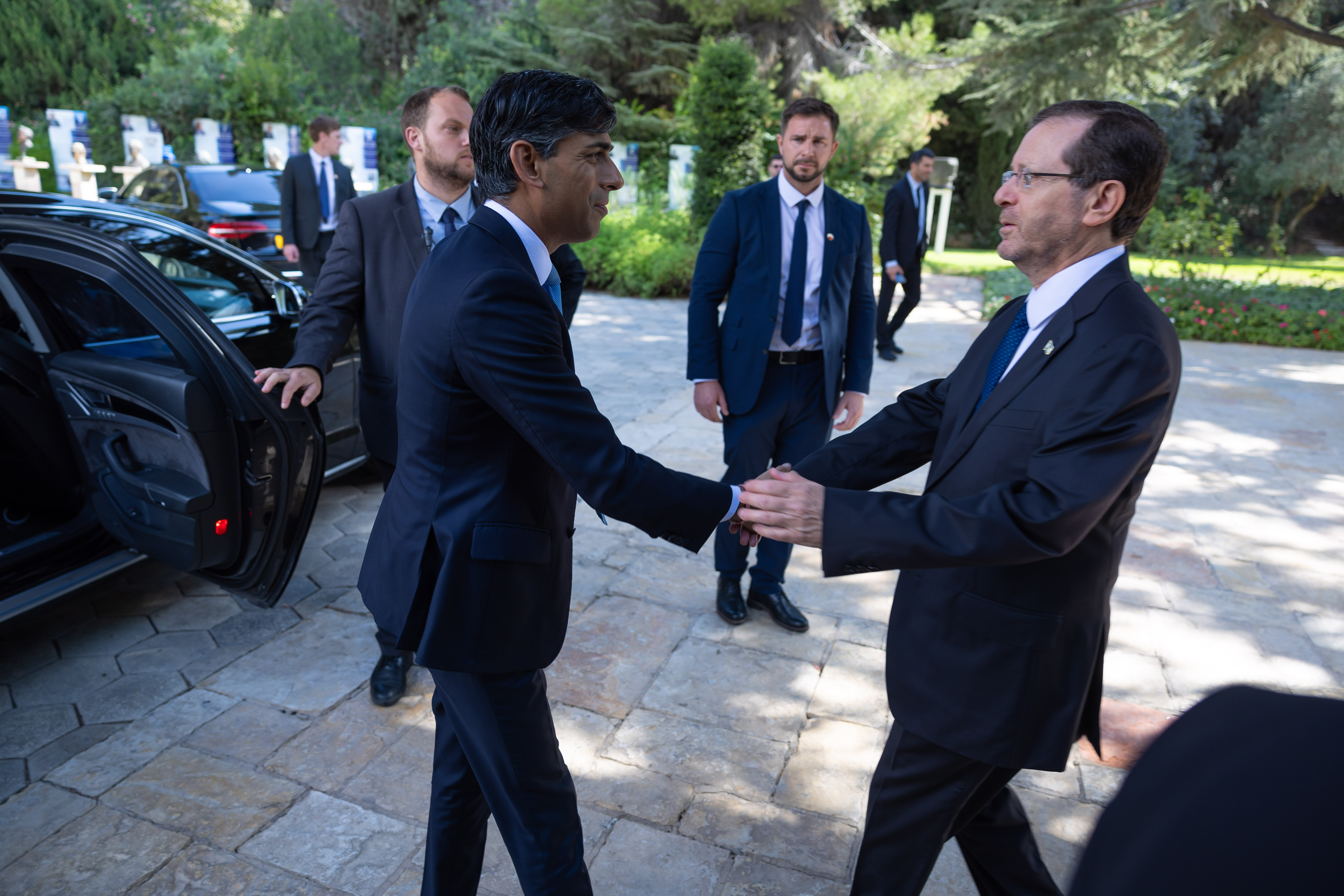
Rishi Sunak with Israeli President Isaac Herzog in Jerusalem, 19 October 2023

There were also two diplomatic incidents during the 1980s that involved operations by the Mossad (Israeli secret service). In 1986, a bag containing eight forged British passports was discovered in a telephone booth in West Germany. The passports had been the work of Mossad, and were intended for the Israeli Embassy in London for use in covert operations. The British government, furious, demanded that Israel give a promise not forge its passports again, which was obtained. In June 1988, two Israeli diplomats, Arie Regev and Jacob Barad, from the Mossad station in London were expelled and the station closed after a Palestinian post graduate student living in Hull, Ismail Sowan, was convicted to eleven years in prison for possession of a large arms cache, and it was revealed that he had been a Mossad double agent for ten years.

In 1993, the British Government privately held the belief that Israel was in possession of nuclear weapons, but had no hard evidence to confirm or deny this belief.

Relations improved significantly in the 2000s and 2010s. In June 2019, the Royal Air Force and the Israeli Air Force carried out their first-ever joint exercise. In December 2020, the countries signed an agreement on military cooperation, the text of which has not been published for UK national security reasons.

In September 2026, following the announcement of British sanctions on goods from illegal settlements in the West Bank, Israel decreed the closure of the British Consulate General in Israeli-occupied East Jerusalem.

== Diplomatic relations ==
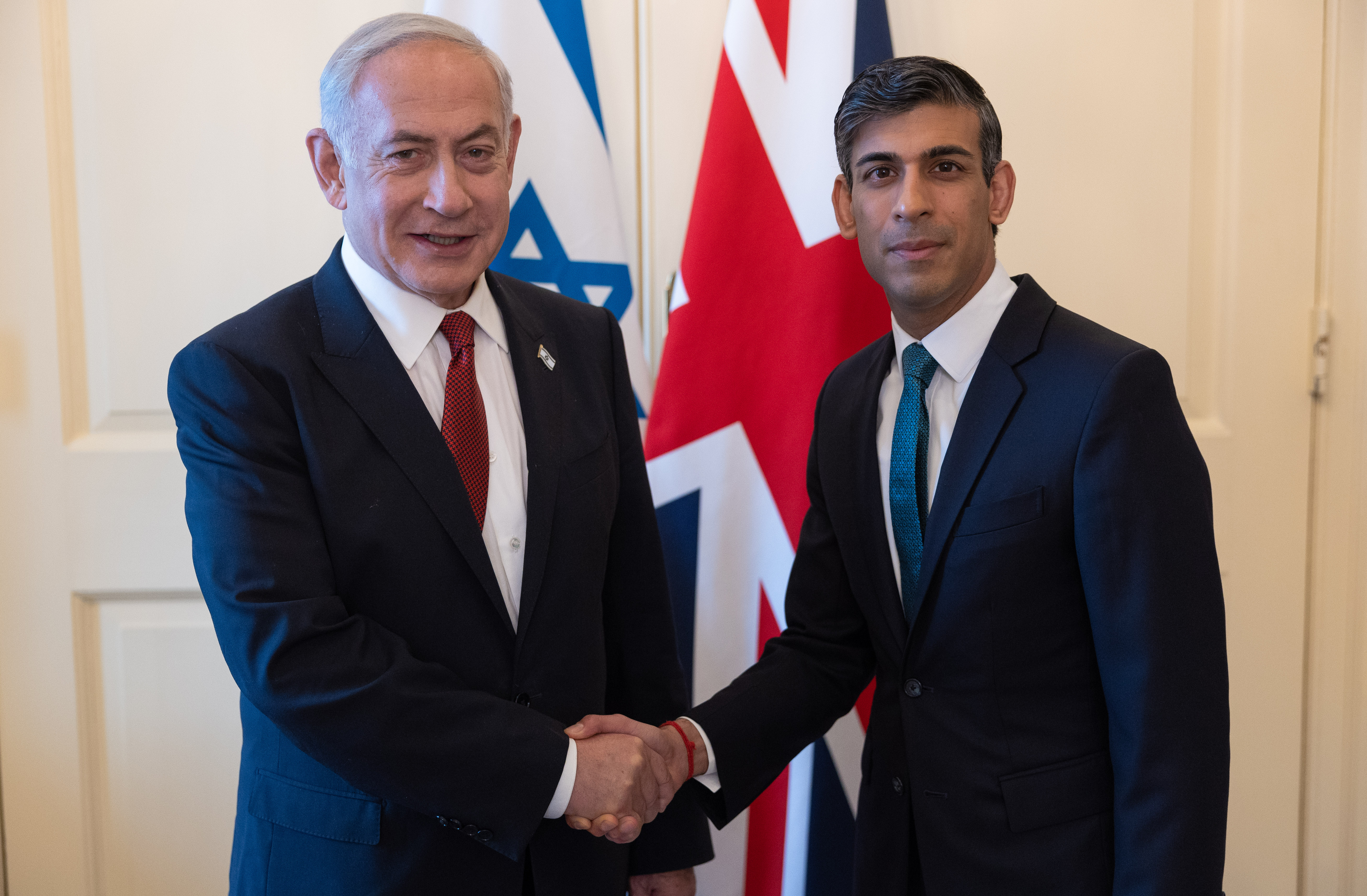
Israeli Prime Minister Benjamin Netanyahu with British Prime Minister Rishi Sunak in London, 24 March 2023

The United Kingdom abstained in the vote in the UN General Assembly in November 1947 for the Partition Plan for Palestine, which included a proposal for the establishment of a Jewish State in a part of the British Mandate territory. Israel proclaimed its independence on 14 May 1948, after the end of the British Mandate, and immediately applied for membership in the United Nations. In a vote by the UN Security Council on Israel’s membership on 17 December 1948, the United Kingdom abstained in the vote. A vote on a renewed application took place on 4 March 1949, in UNSC Resolution 69, in which the UK again abstained, avoiding a veto that a negative vote would have meant, and on 11 May 1949 the UK also abstained in the UN General Assembly for UNGA Resolution 273. However, the UK recognised Israel de facto on January 29 1949, and de jure on 28 April 1950. Sir Alexander Knox Helm was the first British Chargé d'Affaires in Israel, whose rank was later raised to Minister, serving from 1949 to 1951. He was succeeded in 1951 by Francis Evans, whose rank was raised to Ambassador in 1952. The British embassy in Israel is located in Tel Aviv, not Jerusalem, which Israel has declared as its capital.

In 2013, when David Cameron was the UK prime minister, the government stated that "there is no more urgent foreign policy in 2013 than restarting Israeli-Palestinian talks and making substantive progress towards the two-state solution... we are concerned by developments that threaten the viability of the two-state solution, including the construction of settlements on occupied land in the West Bank and East Jerusalem... Our goal is a secure and universally recognised Israel living alongside a sovereign and viable Palestinian state, based on the borders of 1967, with Jerusalem the future capital of both states, and a just, fair and realistic settlement for refugees... The British government is clear that, ultimately, the way to resolve the Israeli-Palestinian conflict is through direct negotiations between the parties. We continue to call on both sides to show the strong leadership needed to achieve peace, to take the necessary steps to build trust and to work towards the resumption of negotiations without preconditions."

During the October 7 attacks, the UK condemned the attack and sent assistance to Israel. The UK foreign minister James Cleverly was in Israel at the time and he was seen running towards a bunker after Hamas launched some rockets. The Mayor of London Sadiq Khan urged Israel to exercise restraint, arguing that a blockade of the Gaza Strip could lead to "suffering" among Palestinian civilians. On October 19 and 20, 2023, British Prime Minister Rishi Sunak conducted a two-day visit to Israel, reiterating his endorsement for the Israeli government and expressing solidarity with its people. He stated that he felt "proud" to stand by Israel in its "long war" against Hamas, which he labeled as "pure evil."

In 2024, British government lawyers argued that Israel had violated international law and that the UK should stop selling arms to the country. Under the new Labour government, Britain is withdrawing its objection to the International Criminal Court (ICC) prosecutor seeking arrest warrants against Israeli Prime Minister Benjamin Netanyahu and Israeli Defense Minister Yoav Gallant for war crimes against humanity. The new government also announced it would restore funding to UNRWA, which had been suspended after Israel alleged that some of its staff were involved in the October 7 Hamas attack.

== Status of Jerusalem ==
The United Kingdom abstained in the vote in the UN General Assembly in November 1947 for the Partition Plan for Palestine, which proposed a status of corpus separatum for Jerusalem. However, despite its abstention, its position on the status of Jerusalem continues to be that "Jerusalem was supposed to be a corpus separatum, or international city administered by the UN. But this was never set up: immediately after the UNGA resolution partitioning Palestine, Israel occupied West Jerusalem and Jordan occupied East Jerusalem (including the Old City). We recognised the de facto control of Israel and Jordan, but not sovereignty. In 1967, Israel occupied E Jerusalem, which we continue to consider is under illegal military occupation by Israel. Our Embassy to Israel is in Tel Aviv, not Jerusalem. In E Jerusalem we have a Consulate-General, with a Consul-General who is not accredited to any state: this is an expression of our view that no state has sovereignty over Jerusalem."

The official UK position is that the city's status has yet to be determined, and maintains that it should be settled in an overall agreement between the parties concerned, but considers that the city should not again be divided. However, in 2013 the British government expressed the view that Jerusalem should be the future capital of both Israel and Palestine, despite Israel’s declaration of Jerusalem as its united capital, and the annexation of East Jerusalem in 1980. The United Kingdom voted in favour of UNSC Resolution 478 which condemned Israel’s annexation of East Jerusalem and declared it to be a violation of international law, and referred to Jerusalem as an occupied Palestinian territory (as opposed to corpus separatum). It also has stated that since the 1967 war, it has regarded Israel as being in military occupation of East Jerusalem, but as the de facto authority in West Jerusalem.

Some British political figures expressed support for Jewish claims to Jerusalem. Winston Churchill is known to have stated that "you ought to let the Jews have Jerusalem; it is they who made it famous." On June 2025, following the Twelve-Day War, the United Kingdom announced it will temporarily evacuate family members from its embassy and consulate in Jerusalem and Tel Aviv.

== Popular opinion ==
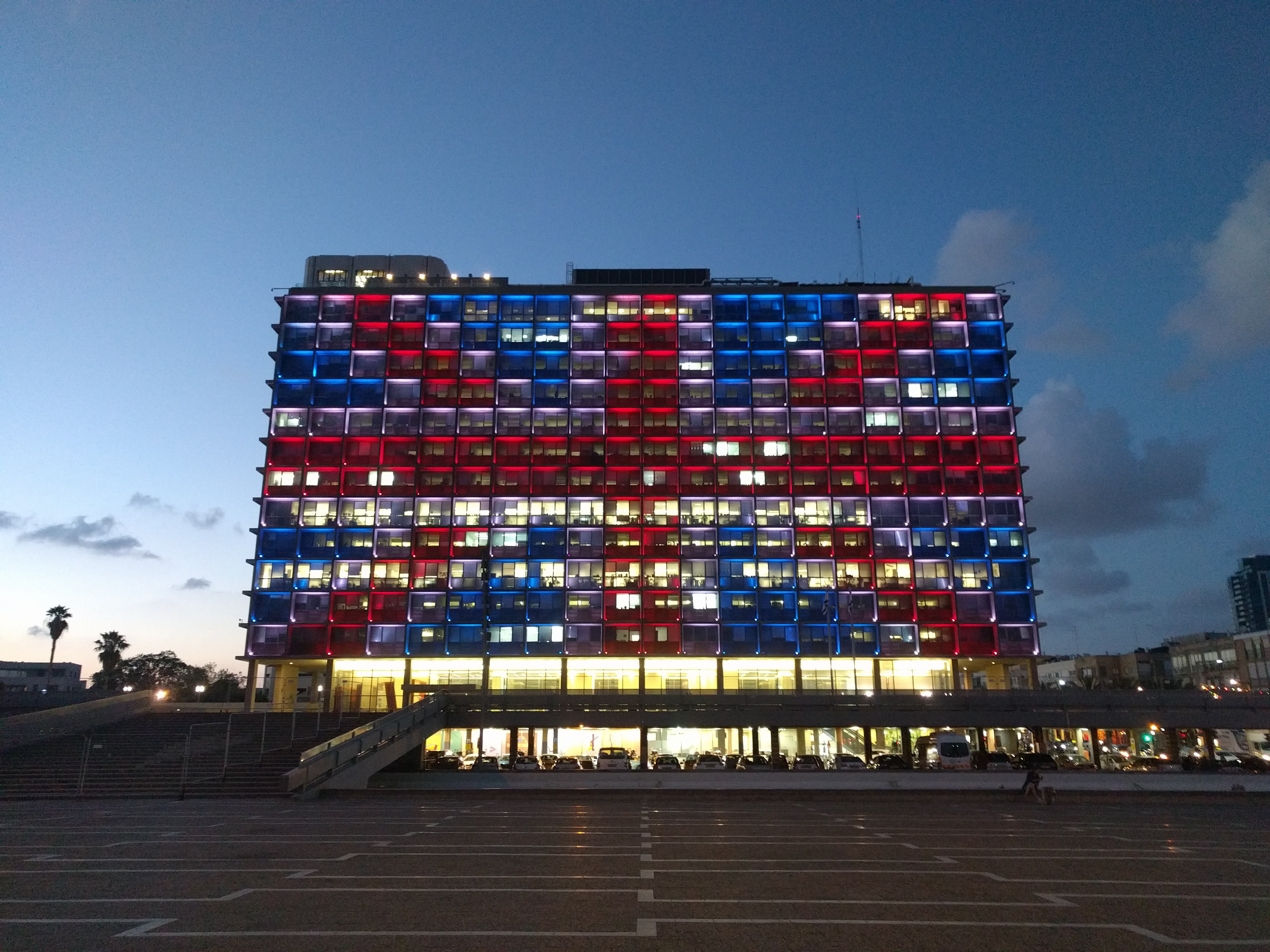
Tel Aviv City Hall illuminated with the colours of the Union Jack in solidarity with the UK following the Manchester Arena attack, 2017

According to a 2014 poll conducted by GlobeScan and the Program on International Policy Attitudes for the BBC World Service, the British public views Israel overwhelmingly negatively, while Israelis view the UK positively: 72% of British people were reported as holding negative views towards Israel, with only 19% holding positive ones. The same poll recorded that 50% of Israeli respondents viewed the UK favourably, with only 6% doing so negatively.

An October 2015 poll of the British public, commissioned by the Britain Israel Communications and Research Centre and carried out by the British market research firm Populus, indicated that 62% of Britons described themselves as viewing Israel negatively, while 19% said they were favourable to Israel. In the same poll 52% of respondents said they considered Israel "an ally of Britain", with 19% of respondents disagreeing with that description. Respondents were asked if they agreed with the statement: "I don't boycott goods or produce from Israel and find it difficult to understand why others would single out Israel to boycott given everything else that's going on around the world at the moment"—43% said they agreed while 12% said they disagreed. When asked if they would be more likely to boycott goods from Israeli settlements in the occupied territories than goods from Israel itself, 25% replied in the affirmative and 19% replied in the negative.

According to a YouGov poll conducted on 7-8 November 2023, older people and Conservatives are more likely to sympathize with the Israelis, while younger people and Labour Party voters are more likely to sympathize with the Palestinians.

According to a December 2023 YouGov poll conducted amid the Gaza war and commissioned by Medical Aid for Palestinians and the Council for Arab-British Understanding, 71% of the British public believe that there should definitely (48%) or probably (23%) be an immediate ceasefire in Gaza, while only 12% thought that there should definitely not (6%) or probably not (6%) be an immediate ceasefire. Additionally, the poll found that 17% of the British public approve of the British government's handling of the conflict, while only 9% approve of the opposition Labour Party's handling of the conflict, revealing that there is "a total and utter lack of public confidence in the way both the UK government and the Labour Party have handled this".

According to a 2025 Pew Research Center survey, 30% of people in the United Kingdom had a favourable view of Israel, while 61% had an unfavourable view; 24% had confidence in Israeli Prime Minister Benjamin Netanyahu, while 68% did not.

A NatCen survey reported in November 2026 found that 78% of people in Britain view Israel as a "serious threat to world peace". This figure was 48% in 2005. The survey also found Iran at 75% and the US at 74% — both below Israel's 78%.

== Economic relations ==
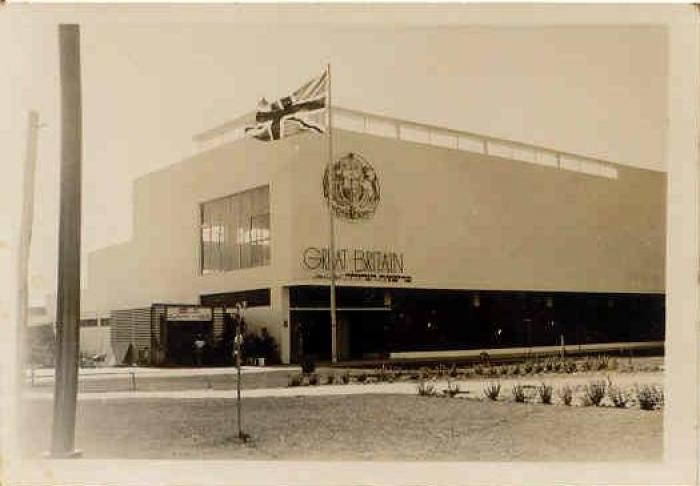
British pavilion at the Orient Fair, 1934

Annual bilateral trade exceeds £6.1 billion and over 300 known Israeli companies are operating in Britain. While visiting Israel in November 2010, UK Foreign Secretary William Hague called UK-Israel science and business ties "one of the cornerstones of the relationship between Britain and Israel."

In 2009, the United Kingdom's Department for the Environment, Food and Rural Affairs issued new guidelines concerning labelling of goods imported from the West Bank. The new guidelines require labelling to clarify whether West Bank products originate from settlements or from the Palestinian economy. Israel's foreign ministry said that the UK was "catering to the demands of those whose ultimate goal is the boycott of Israeli products"; but this was denied by the UK government, which claimed that the aim of the new regulations was merely to allow consumers to choose for themselves what produce they buy.

In 2011 the Embassy of the United Kingdom in Israel launched a new project aiming to facilitate economic and business ties between the UK and Israel. Dubbed the UK–Israel Technologies Hub, the initiative seeks also to identify opportunities among Israeli and Palestinian Arab entrepreneurs. One of the goals of the project is to encourage British companies to set up R&D facilities in Israel in order to tap Israel's skilled engineering base. Cleantech development is among the sectors the Technologies Hub targets for promoting British-Israeli partnerships.

A 2011 White Paper on Trade and Investment for Growth issued by the government of the United Kingdom pointed to Israel as a pivotal strategic partner for Britain's future. Figures released early in 2012 showed that Israel was the United Kingdom's largest trade partner in the Middle East, with bilateral trade between the two nations amounting to £3.75 billion ($6 billion) in 2011 – up 34% from the preceding year. Matthew Gould, Britain's ambassador to Israel, pointed out that the figures demonstrated that the effect of boycott movements on trade between the UK and Israel was minuscule. He added that one of his goals was to bring more Israeli businesses to the UK.

In 2011, the United Kingdom established a technology centre at the British Embassy in Tel Aviv, known as the UK-Israel Tech Hub, which is the only such facility sponsored by a government at its embassy in the world, to encourage cooperation between Israeli and British high-tech companies. Tech Hub was inaugurated by George Osborne, who served as Britain's Chancellor of the Exchequer. The centre has established the TexChange programme, which selected 15 Israeli start-ups to travel to London and gain experience in high-tech in London. The programme also offers Israeli companies access to more markets in the United Kingdom and Europe. Tech Hub has also brought British entrepreneurs to Israel to participate in Israel's high-tech scene. In 2018, the British embassy initiated a program to incorporate Israeli medical technology into the NHS in order to improve its digital health technology.

Israel and the UK engage together in scientific research, defence and the development of new technologies, with the UK seeking to tap into Israel's considerable High technology sector. The United Kingdom opened the UK Israel Tech Hub in order to encourage British collaboration with advanced Israeli high technology. The UK since 2011 has sought to partner British companies with Israeli advanced technology companies. The UK Israeli cooperation has generated £1.2 billion as well as 16,000 British jobs of 250 such partnerships.

=== Trade agreements ===
From 1 June 2000 until 30 December 2020, trade between Israel and the UK was governed by the Israel–European Union Association Agreement, while the United Kingdom was a member of the European Union. Following the withdrawal of the United Kingdom from the European Union, the UK and Israel signed a continuity trade agreement on 18 February 2019, based on the EU free trade agreement; the agreement entered into force on 1 January 2021. Trade value between Israel and the United Kingdom was worth £6,881 million in 2022.

The United Kingdom and Israel opened negotiations for an updated free trade agreement. The United Kingdom and Israel are currently negotiating renewing a free trade agreement as of July 2024.

Israel - UK trade in millions USD-$
	Israel imports United Kingdom exports	United Kingdom imports Israel exports	Total trade value
2023	2908.5	2125.8	5034.3
2022	3186.8	3121.2	6308
2021	2990.2	2057.5	5047.7
2020	2973.8	3712.7	6686.5
2019	3027.1	4992.4	8019.5
2018	6151.4	4341.2	10492.6
2017	4305	5168.2	9473.2
2016	3667.9	3909.1	7577
2015	2272.4	3992.4	6264.8
2014	2333.6	3974.8	6308.4
2013	2420.9	3853.5	6274.4
2012	2598.1	3568.7	6166.8
2011	2776.7	3424.7	6201.4
2010	2246.4	2268.1	4514.5
2009	1907.2	1423.5	3330.7
2008	2519.9	1892.7	4412.6
2007	2681.4	1938.1	4619.5
2006	2458.6	1601.7	4060.3
2005	2552.1	1649.9	4202
2004	2482.8	1447.8	3930.6
2003	2283.4	1224.5	3507.9
2002	2226.8	1164.5	3391.3

== Cultural and educational relations ==
The Britain-Israel Research and Academic Exchange (BIRAX) was launched in 2008 to improve academic cooperation between universities in Israel and the UK. BIRAX, created by the British Council in Israel in collaboration with Pears Foundation, brings together Israeli and British scientists through funding of joint research projects. In November 2010, ten British-Israeli research projects were selected to receive BIRAX funding. UK Foreign Secretary William Hague also announced the establishment of the UK-Israel Life Sciences Council to further scientific collaboration between the two countries. The British Israeli Arts Training Scheme (BI ARTS) was established to improve links between the British and Israeli arts industries.

In 2013, Raymond Dwek was appointed Commander of the Order of the British Empire (CBE) in the Queen's New Year Honours for services to UK/Israel scientific collaboration.

Commonwealth countries such as Pakistan and Bangladesh are often represented in Israel through the British Embassy.

== Military relations ==
There are several defence agreements between the UK and Israel. In addition to the 10-year trade and defence pact signed in November 2021, the two countries signed a military cooperation agreement in December 2020, the text of which has not been published for UK national security reasons. This agreement formalizes and enhances their military collaboration, including defence medical training, organizational design concepts, and defence education. Moreover, in March 2023, the UK and Israel signed the 2030 Roadmap for UK-Israeli Bilateral Relations. This ambitious agreement aims to deepen cooperation across various sectors, including security, trade, cyber, science and technology, research and development, health, climate, and gender. These agreements highlight the strong and multifaceted relationship between the UK and Israel, focusing on mutual priorities and shared challenges.

In 2025, a study conducted by Channel 4's FactCheck team, along with data analysed from Israeli customs records, revealed that the United Kingdom’s arms exports to Israel had reached their highest level since records began in 2022. According to the analysis, British exports of weapons and ammunition to Israel totalled approximately £400,000 in June 2025 alone, bringing the cumulative value for the first nine months of the year to nearly £1 million—more than double that of previous years. The findings emerged despite the UK government’s earlier pledge in 2024 to review or suspend certain export licenses to Israel amid concerns about the use of British-made components in the Gaza conflict.

The Campaign Against Arms Trade (CAAT) reported that new export licences worth approximately £11.85 million for military-related components were approved. Data published by the UK government and analysed by the House of Commons Library indicates that export licensing has continued in certain categories, including licences described as intended for re-export to third countries. Human rights organisations have raised concerns regarding transparency in end-use monitoring and the potential diversion of exported equipment. The UK government states that export controls remain in place and that each licence application is assessed individually in line with international obligations.

== Diplomatic tensions ==
=== Arrest warrants ===
Diplomatic issues arose between Israel and the UK over the threat of senior Israeli military and political figures on official visits to the UK being arrested and tried for alleged war crimes under the principle of universal jurisdiction. Pro-Palestinian and human rights activists and groups have filed petitions in British courts urging that arrest warrants be issued for Israeli officials planning on visiting the UK. This led to the cancellation of visits by Israeli officials to the UK multiple times.

When he flew to England in 2005, retired Israeli general Doron Almog narrowly escaped arrest for war crimes after a British judge had issued a warrant for his arrest. Almog was tipped off about the arrest and stayed on the plane until its return flight to Israel after 2 hours. It was later revealed that the police failed to board the plane because they were denied permission by El Al, Israel's national airline, and feared an armed confrontation with El Al sky marshals and Almog's bodyguards, and the "international impact of a potentially armed police operation at an airport". A minor diplomatic incident occurred, with the Israeli foreign minister Silvan Shalom calling the event an "outrage"; his British counterpart Jack Straw apologised for any embarrassment caused.

In 2006, Israeli Brigadier General and future Chief of Staff Aviv Kochavi, then the commander of the IDF Gaza Division, cancelled plans to study in the UK on the advice of Israeli Military Advocate General Avichai Mandelblit over the possibility that he would be arrested. A security official told the media that "at this point, to send him to London, or any other officer who fought in the territories, is a danger. There's no reason to cause an IDF officer embarrassment and his trip is not an option at this time." An army source said that "the problem won't solve itself. It will always be in the air, it always interfere with us. This time, when a trip by a senior officer like Kochavi has been cancelled, an officer who dedicated so many years in the battlefield, it especially hurts. Steps should be taken to fix the situation."

In 2007, Avi Dichter, the former commander of Shin Bet, Israel's domestic intelligence service, then serving as Public Security Minister, cancelled a planned visit to the UK, where he was slated to speak at a security conference at King's College London, after being advised by the Israeli foreign and justice ministries not to risk the visit. It was feared that an arrest warrant would be issued against him over his role in the assassination of Salah Shehade in 2002.

In December 2009, an arrest warrant was issued for then leader of the opposition Tzipi Livni due to alleged war crimes committed during the 2008–2009 Gaza War, when Livni was Foreign Minister. Police subsequently raided a hotel in London where she was believed to be staying in order to arrest her, but after an investigation it was established that Livni was not even present in the United Kingdom. A pro-Palestinian organization had mistaken Tami Shor, the Deputy Director-General of Israel's Water Authority, for Livni at a conference in London. Livni had been slated to attend the conference before cancelling her planned visit to the UK two weeks earlier. Shortly afterward, a group of Israeli military officers who had been invited to the UK by the British Army for a meeting on military cooperation cancelled the planned visit for fear of arrest over the Gaza War. Israeli officials had feared the possibility of arrest warrants being issued, and asked the British authorities for a guarantee that the officers would not be arrested. The visit was cancelled after the British informed Israeli officials that they could not give such a guarantee.

According to Roni Sofer, these incidents strained relations between Israel and the United Kingdom, and Israel urged the UK to rethink its policies to prevent further damage to the relationship. A few months earlier, former military chief Moshe Ya'alon had called off a visit to Britain due to similar concerns. Israeli Defense Minister Ehud Barak was also threatened with arrest, but the courts ruled that as a sitting minister he enjoyed diplomatic immunity. British Foreign Secretary David Miliband announced that Britain would no longer tolerate legal harassment of Israeli officials in this fashion and that threats of arrest against visitors of Livni's stature would not happen again. To achieve this, British law would be reformed.

Israel's deputy foreign minister Danny Ayalon said that the risk of arrest was harming bilateral relations but the law was not changed as promised. Israel halted the "special strategic dialogue" with Britain in protest.

Legislation passed in 2011 under David Cameron's Coalition government required that the Director of Public Prosecutions give his consent to any private prosecution for war crimes under universal jurisdiction, ostensibly to prevent politically motivated cases and to ensure that there was solid evidence. Justice Secretary Kenneth Clark explained that "the balance is struck between ensuring those who are accused of such heinous crimes do not escape justice and that universal jurisdiction cases are only proceeded with on the basis of solid evidence." Livni arrived in the UK later that year in what was perceived to be a test case of the new legislation. The Crown Prosecution Service later revealed that it had received an application for an arrest warrant but no conclusion had been reached on whether there was sufficient evidence to support conviction. Foreign secretary William Hague then declared that Livni was on a "special mission," which granted her immunity from prosecution. The "special mission" status was effective in protecting Livni in this case.

=== Israel's commemoration of the King David Hotel bombing ===
In July 2006 the British government protested against Israel's celebration of the anniversary of the King David Hotel bombing, an act of terrorism which killed 91 people of various nationalities, including some civilians. In the literature about the practice and history of terrorism, it has been called one of the most lethal terrorist attacks of the 20th century. However, security analyst Bruce Hoffman wrote of the bombing in his book Inside Terrorism that "Unlike many terrorist groups today, the Irgun's strategy [by sending warnings to evacuate the hotel] was not deliberately to harm civilians. At the same time, though, the claim of Begin and other apologists that warnings were issued cannot absolve either the group or its commander for the ninety-one people killed and forty-five others injured ... Indeed, whatever nonlethal intentions the Irgun might or might not have had, the fact remains that a tragedy of almost unparalleled magnitude was inflicted ... so that to this day the bombing remains one of the world's single most lethal terrorist incidents of the twentieth century."

The Menachem Begin Heritage Center held a conference to mark the 60th anniversary of the bombing of the King David Hotel in 1946 by the Irgun. The conference was attended by past and future Prime Minister Benjamin Netanyahu and former members of Irgun. The British Ambassador in Tel Aviv and the Consul-General in Jerusalem protested, saying: "We do not think that it is right for an act of terrorism, which led to the loss of many lives, to be commemorated", and wrote to the Mayor of Jerusalem that such an "act of terror" could not be honoured. The British government also demanded the removal of the plaque, pointing out that the statement on it accusing the British of failing to evacuate the hotel was untrue and "did not absolve those who planted the bomb."

MK Reuven Rivlin (Likud), raised the British protest in the Knesset. The issue had a personal dimension for Tzipi Livni, Israel's then-foreign minister, as Irgun's chief operations officer at the time of the bombing was her father, Eitan. To prevent escalation of the diplomatic row, Israel made changes in the plaque's text, but made greater changes in the English than the Hebrew version. The final English version says, "Warning phone calls has [sic] been made to the hotel, The Palestine Post and the French Consulate, urging the hotel's occupants to leave immediately. The hotel was not evacuated and after 25 minutes the bombs exploded. To the Irgun's regret, 92 persons were killed." The death toll given includes Avraham Abramovitz, the Irgun member who was shot during the attack and died later from his wounds, but only the Hebrew version of the sign makes that clear.

=== Forged passports ===
In February 2010, Israel was suspected of forging British passports for use in a mission to assassinate Hamas leader Mahmoud al-Mabhouh in Dubai.

On the 23 March 2010 the UK's then-foreign secretary David Miliband reported to the House on the investigation by the UK Serious Organised Crime Agency (SOCA) into the use of counterfeit British passports in the killing of Mahmoud al-Mabhouh in Dubai on 19 January. Mr Miliband reported that as the Dubai operation had been a very sophisticated one, using high-quality forgeries, the British government had judged it highly likely that they had been created by a state intelligence service. Taking that together with other inquiries, and the link to Israel established by SOCA, the British government had concluded that there were compelling reasons to believe that Israel was responsible for the misuse of British passports.

"SOCA conducted an extremely professional investigation," said Miliband. "The Israeli authorities met all the requests that SOCA made of them. SOCA was drawn to the conclusion that the passports used were copied from genuine British passports when handed over for inspection to individuals linked to Israel, either in Israel or in other countries. ... Such misuse of British passports is intolerable. It presents a hazard to the safety of British nationals in the region. Also, it represents a profound disregard for the sovereignty of the UK. The fact that that was done by a country that is a friend, with significant diplomatic, cultural, business and personal ties to the UK, only adds insult to injury. Diplomatic work between Britain and Israel needs to be conducted according to the highest standards of trust. The work of our embassy in Israel and the Israeli embassy in London is vital to the co-operation between our countries. So is the strategic dialogue between our countries. Those ties are important, and we want them to continue. However, I have asked for a member of the embassy of Israel to be withdrawn from the UK as a result of this affair, and that is taking place."

Israel has a stated policy on security matters of neither confirming nor denying its involvement. In Dublin, the Israeli ambassador Zion Evrony said he knew nothing about the killing of the Hamas commander.

=== Labelling ===
The British government announced in 2009 that it would advise UK retailers and importers to distinguish whether imported produce from the West Bank was made by Palestinians or in Jewish settlements. The Palestinian delegation to the UK welcomed the move, but Israel said it was "extremely disappointed".

=== Comments by Israeli embassy official ===
In January 2017, Al Jazeera aired a series entitled The Lobby. The last episode showed Shai Masot, an official at the Israeli embassy in London, proposing an attempt to "take down" British "pro-Palestinian" politicians, including Alan Duncan. The leader of the opposition Jeremy Corbyn wrote an open letter to Theresa May objecting to what he called an "improper interference in this country’s democratic process" and urging the prime minister to launch an inquiry on the basis that "[t]his is clearly a national security issue". The Israeli ambassador Mark Regev apologised to Duncan for the "completely unacceptable" comments made in the video. A Foreign Office spokesman said it "is clear these comments do not reflect the views of the embassy or government of Israel". Masot resigned shortly after the recordings were made public.

=== Israeli–Palestinian conflict ===
In April 2024, at least 130 British lawmakers wrote to Foreign Secretary David Cameron and Business Secretary Kemi Badenoch calling on the British government to halt arms sales to Israel. Pressure for an arms embargo has increased after an attack on a World Food Center convoy in Gaza, which killed seven aid workers, including three British nationals. Britain's readiness to impose ban is partly linked to Israel's refusal to allow the International Committee of the Red Cross to visit the Sde Teiman detention center, where Palestinian prisoners are held. lack of cooperation in allowing humanitarian aid into Gaza, was another reason. 58% of Britons support ending arms sales to Israel during the Gaza war, compared to 18% that are against it.

On 19 May 2025, Britain, along with Canada and France, issued a joint statement condemning Israel's "egregious" actions in Gaza. They warned of the possibility of further concrete actions" if Israel continued its military offensive and failed to lift restrictions on humanitarian aid. Netanyahu responded by saying that Britain, France and Canada were "guilty" of supporting Hamas.

In April 2026, Westminster Magistrates' Court dismissed an application by the International Centre of Justice for Palestinians (ICJP) to prosecute a dual British-Israeli national under the Foreign Enlistment Act 1870 for serving in the IDF as a reservist following the October 7 attacks. Senior District Judge Paul Goldspring ruled the application an abuse of process, finding it legally, evidentially, and procedurally defective. The judgement reaffirmed the longstanding position of successive UK governments that the Act does not apply to dual nationals serving in the armed forces of their other country of nationality.

=== Sanctions on Israeli settlements in the West Bank ===
In September 2026, Britain, Canada, and France said they would impose sanctions on Israeli settlements in the West Bank, which are considered illegal under international law. The sanctions aim to ban settlement goods, act against companies and individuals providing services to settlements and ban the advertisement of settlements in the UK. When announcing the sanctions, Foreign Secretary Ed Miliband said that the Israeli government has too often 'turned a blind eye' to the 'ethnic cleansing of Palestinians in areas of the West Bank, perpetrated by settler terrorists'. The foreign ministers of Qatar, Turkey, Egypt, Indonesia, Jordan, Pakistan, Saudi Arabia and the UAE said they welcomed the decision “to ban the import of goods from illegal Israeli settlements." The Israeli government responded by closing the British consulate in Jerusalem and banning 11 UK MPs, including Jeremy Corbyn, Diane Abbott and all five sitting Green Party MPs, from entering Israel.

== See also ==
- British Mandate for Palestine
- International recognition of Israel
- Embassy of the United Kingdom, Tel Aviv
- Embassy of Israel, London
- Northern Ireland Friends of Israel
- Palestine–United Kingdom relations
- British Jews
- Israel lobby in the United Kingdom
