= International recognition of Israel =

Israel States that recognize Israel States that recognize Israel, but have suspended relations States that do not recognize Israeli statehood

As of February 2026, the State of Israel is recognized as a sovereign state by 169 of the other 192 member states of the United Nations, or approximately 88% of all UN members. The State of Israel was formally established by the Israeli Declaration of Independence on 14 May 1948, and was admitted to the United Nations (UN) as a full member state on 11 May 1949. It also maintains bilateral ties with all of the UNSC Permanent Five. Twenty-three member states have either never formally recognized Israel or have withdrawn their recognition; others have severed diplomatic relations without explicitly withdrawing their recognition. Additionally, many non-recognizing countries have challenged Israel's existence—predominantly those in the Muslim world—due to significant animosity stemming from the Israeli–Palestinian conflict and the Arab–Israeli conflict.

== History ==
On 14 May 1948, the Israeli Declaration of Independence declared the establishment a Jewish state in part of the former British Mandate of Palestine, with borders formally established by the Green Line of the 1949 Armistice Agreements at the end of the 1948 Palestine war. The Arab League was opposed to any partition and to the establishment of Israel, and an Arab coalition jointly invaded the territory of the newly formed country one day after its independence, sparking the 1948 Arab–Israeli War.

Following Israel's establishment, the Israeli provisional government was established to govern the Yishuv; and while military operations were still in progress, it was promptly granted de facto recognition by the United States, followed by Iran (which had voted against the Partition Plan), Guatemala, Iceland, Nicaragua, Romania, and Uruguay. The Soviet Union was the first country to grant de jure recognition to Israel on 17 May 1948, followed by Nicaragua, Czechoslovakia, Yugoslavia, and Poland. The United States extended de jure recognition after the first Israeli election, on 31 January 1949.

By the late 1960s, Israel had established diplomatic relations with almost all of the countries of Western Europe, North America, South America, and Sub-Saharan Africa combined.

To put additional diplomatic, economic, and military pressure on Israel in the wake of the 1967 Arab–Israeli War, oil-producing Arab countries imposed an oil embargo on countries that had bilateral relations with Israel. As a result, many African and Asian countries broke off their ties with Israel. The Soviet Union also shifted its support in favour of the Arab cause against Israel during this time, leading most countries of the Eastern Bloc to sever diplomatic ties in 1967; these included the Soviet Union itself, as well as Poland, Czechoslovakia, Hungary, and Bulgaria. Other countries in the Soviet sphere of influence, such as the People's Republic of China and Mongolia, also did not establish relations with Israel. Diplomatic relations with these countries were restored or established following the collapse of the Eastern Bloc in 1989. The Soviet Union restored relations in October 1991, and new countries that had gained independence after the dissolution of the Soviet Union also recognised Israel in their own right. China established relations in January 1992.

On 1 September 1967, the then-eight members of the Arab League issued the Khartoum Resolution, which included three pledges that forbade recognition, peace, and negotiations with Israel. However, Egypt, Jordan, and Mauritania gradually recognized Israel, though Mauritania broke off ties and withdrew recognition in 2010. As part of the 2020 Abraham Accords, the United Arab Emirates, Bahrain, and Morocco all established normalized bilateral ties with Israel, with Sudan announcing its plan (never completed) to do so. Pressure was again exerted by the Arab League after the 1973 Arab–Israeli War, which led Cuba, Mali, and the Maldives to break off ties with Israel. Niger severed bilateral ties with Israel during the Second Intifada, and Venezuela broke off ties after the 2008–2009 Gaza War.

Following Israel's recognition of and entering into negotiations with the Palestine Liberation Organization (PLO), many African, Asian, and Arab countries either restored or established diplomatic relations with Israel. The Vatican began a bilateral relationship with Israel in 1994. Some countries (Note: Countries that broke or suspended diplomatic relations with Israel in 2006 during the Lebanon War: Egypt maintained diplomatic relations despite condemning the war.; Jordan maintained diplomatic relations despite condemning the war.; Venezuela — withdrew its ambassador in protest against Israeli military actions.) (Note: Countries that broke or suspended diplomatic relations with Israel mainly in response to the 2007 blockade of the Gaza Strip and subsequent military operations: Bolivia severed diplomatic relations with Israel in January 2009, condemning the blockade and military actions.; Mauritania expelled the Israeli ambassador and suspended diplomatic relations in March 2009, protesting Israel's Gaza policies.; Venezuela, which had already protested Israel over Lebanon in 2006, further condemned the Gaza blockade and downgraded relations around 2009.) broke or suspended relations during the 2006 Lebanon War and after the blockade of the Gaza Strip. Although Guinea broke diplomatic ties with Israel in 1967, Israel's extensive support for Guinea during its fight against an Ebola virus epidemic led to the re-establishment of bilateral relations in 2016. Nicaragua restored relations in March 2017; Chad did likewise in January 2019. The most recent country to establish diplomatic relations with Israel was Bhutan, on 12 December 2020.

== United Nations membership ==
On 15 May 1948, one day after its independence, Israel applied for membership with the United Nations (UN), but the application was not acted on by the Security Council. Israel's second application was rejected by the Security Council on 17 December 1948 by a 5-to-1 vote, with 5 abstentions. The First Syrian Republic was the sole negative vote; the United States, Argentina, Colombia, the Soviet Union, and the Ukrainian SSR voted in favour; and Belgium, the United Kingdom, Canada, the Republic of China, and France abstained.

Israel's application was renewed in 1949 after the first Israeli election. By Security Council Resolution 69 on 4 March 1949, the UN Security Council voted 9-to-1 in favour of Israeli membership, with the Kingdom of Egypt voting against and the United Kingdom abstaining. Those voting in favour were China, France, the United States, the Soviet Union, Argentina, Canada, the Republic of Cuba, Norway, and the Ukrainian SSR.

On 11 May 1949, the UN General Assembly, by the requisite two-thirds majority of its then-58 members, approved the application to admit Israel to the UN by General Assembly Resolution 273. The vote in the General Assembly was 37 to 12, with 9 abstentions. Those that voted in favour of Israel were: Argentina, Australia, Bolivia, the Byelorussian SSR, Canada, Chile, China, Colombia, Costa Rica, Cuba, Czechoslovakia, the Dominican Republic, Ecuador, France, Guatemala, Haiti, Honduras, Iceland, Liberia, Luxembourg, Mexico, the Netherlands, New Zealand, Nicaragua, Norway, Panama, Paraguay, Peru, the Philippines, communist Poland, the Ukrainian SSR, South Africa, the Soviet Union, the United States, Uruguay, Venezuela, and Yugoslavia. Those that voted against were six of the then-seven members of the Arab League (Egypt, the Kingdom of Iraq, Lebanon, Saudi Arabia, Syria, and the Kingdom of Yemen) as well as the Kingdom of Afghanistan, post-independence Burma, the Ethiopian Empire, the Dominion of India, Pahlavi Iran and the Dominion of Pakistan. Those abstaining were: Belgium, fourth-republic Brazil, Denmark, El Salvador, the Kingdom of Greece, Thailand (then known as Siam), Sweden, Turkey, and the United Kingdom. Many of the countries that voted in favour or had abstained had already recognized Israel before the UN vote, at least on a de facto basis.

== Present situation ==
Legend: Israel Countries that reject passports from Israel Countries that reject passports from Israel and any other passport that contains Israeli stamps or visas

As of February 2026, 169 of the 192 other member states of the United Nations (UN) recognize Israel. Several states do not recognize Israel, including several members of the Arab League and other non-Arab members of the Organisation of Islamic Cooperation. In 2002, the Arab League proposed the recognition of Israel by Arab countries as a pathway towards a resolution of the Israeli–Palestinian conflict under the Arab Peace Initiative. Following the Abraham Accords, which were signed in September 2020 between Israel and the United Arab Emirates and Bahrain, the Palestinian National Authority condemned any Arab agreement with Israel as dishonourable, describing them as a betrayal to the Palestinian cause and a blow to their quest for an independent Palestinian state.

The passports of some countries are not valid for travel to Israel, including Bangladesh, Brunei, Iran, Iraq, and Pakistan. Thirteen countries do not accept Israeli passports: Algeria, Bangladesh, Brunei, Iran, Iraq, Kuwait, Lebanon, Libya, Malaysia, Pakistan, Saudi Arabia, Syria, and Yemen. Some of these countries also do not accept passports of other countries whose holder has an Israeli visa or stamp on it. The stamp may be a visa stamp, or a stamp on entry or departure. Because of these issues, Israeli immigration controls do not stamp passports with an entry visa, instead issuing a separate insert which is discarded on departure. However, a stamp of another country which indicates that the person has entered Israel may frustrate that effort. For example, if an Egyptian departure stamp is used in any passport at the Taba Border Crossing, that is an indication that the person entered Israel, and a similar situation arises for land crossings into Jordan. Some countries also ban direct flights and overflights to and from Israel. In August 2020, the United Arab Emirates permitted direct flights from Israel, and Saudi Arabia and Bahrain authorized overflights for such flights. On 8 October 2020, Israel and Jordan reached an agreement to allow flights to cross over both countries' airspace.

== States that recognize Israel ==
The following is a list of states that have recognized Israel, with states that have suspended their diplomatic relations with Israel in yellow. The downgrading of diplomatic relations is separate from derecognizing statehood.

=== UN member states ===
#	State	Date of recognition or establishment of diplomatic relations (Note: The later establishment of diplomatic relations does not necessarily imply that a state did not recognize Israel beforehand.)	Notes
1	Albania	16 April 1949	Diplomatic relations established on 20 August 1991.
2	Andorra	13 April 1994	
3	Angola	16 April 1992	Date diplomatic relations established
4	Antigua and Barbuda	22 June 1983	Date diplomatic relations established
5	Argentina	14 February 1949	
6	Armenia	4 April 1992	Date diplomatic relations established
7	Australia	29 January 1949	
8	Austria	8 May 1956	De facto recognition on 15 March 1949. Diplomatic relations established in 1956. Prior to that, the two countries had maintained consular relations since 1950. Legations were upgraded to embassy status in 1959.
9	Azerbaijan	7 April 1992	Date diplomatic relations established.
10	Bahamas	24 September 1974	Date diplomatic relations established.
11	Bahrain	15 September 2020	On 15 September 2020, an agreement was signed to normalize relations.
12	Barbados	29 August 1967	Date diplomatic relations established
13	Belarus	26 May 1992	De facto recognition 11 May 1949. Date diplomatic relations established in 1992.
14	Belgium	15 January 1950	
15	Belize	6 September 1984	Date diplomatic relations established. Relations suspended in 2023 during the Gaza war.
16	Benin	5 December 1961	Date diplomatic relations established. Relations severed in October 1973, but resumed in July 1992.
17	Bhutan	12 December 2020	Date diplomatic relations established
18	Bolivia	24 February 1949	De facto recognition on 22 February 1949. Relations severed in January 2009, but restored in November 2019. Relations severed in 2023 during the Gaza war, but restored again in December 2025.
19	Bosnia and Herzegovina	26 September 1997	Date diplomatic relations established
20	Botswana	December 1972	After the war in 1973, Botswana was one of only five countries in Africa that did not break off relations with Israel. (Note: The others being Malawi, Eswatini, Lesotho, and South Africa.)
21	Brazil	7 February 1949	
22	Bulgaria	4 December 1948	Relations severed on 10 June 1967, but restored on 3 May 1990.
23	Burkina Faso	5 July 1961	Date diplomatic relations established. Relations severed in October 1973, but re-established in October 1993.
24	Burundi		Relations severed in May 1973, but restored in March 1995.
25	Cambodia	30 August 1960	Date diplomatic relations established. Cambodia broke off relations in 1975; they were restored on 5 October 1993.
26	Cameroon	15 September 1960	Date diplomatic relations established. Relations severed in October 1973, but restored in August 1986.
27	Canada	11 May 1949	
28	Cabo Verde	17 July 1994	Date diplomatic relations established
29	Central African Republic		Relations were severed in October 1973, were resumed in January 1991.
30	Chad	10 January 1961	Relations were established in 1961, but severed on 28 November 1972. In 2005, reports emerged of a mutual intention to renew diplomatic relations. Relations restored on 20 January 2019.
31	Chile	11 May 1949	
32	China	24 January 1992	The Republic of China granted de jure recognition to Israel on 1 March 1949. The two states maintained diplomatic relations until Israel's recognition of the People's Republic of China on 8 January 1950. The PRC, however, did not formally reciprocate until the eventual establishment of diplomatic relations in 1992.
33	Colombia	1 February 1949	On 1 May 2024, president Gustavo Petro announced Colombia would break diplomatic ties with Israel, describing Israel's siege of Gaza as a "genocide". Though, relations were restored in August 2026 following the inauguration of president Abelardo de la Espriella.
34	Costa Rica	19 June 1948	
35	Croatia	4 September 1997	Date diplomatic relations established
36	Cuba	18 April 1949	Recognized by the Republic of Cuba under the presidency of Carlos Prío Socarrás. Cuba under Fidel Castro severed diplomatic relations in September 1973.
37	Cyprus	21 January 1961	Date diplomatic relations established. They had been agreed to on 17 August 1960, but final establishment was postponed due to pressure from Arab nations.
38	Czech Republic	18 May 1948	Recognition extended under Czechoslovakia. Relations under Czechoslovakia were severed between June 1967 and February 1990. Diplomatic relations with the Czech Republic were established 1 January 1993.
39	Democratic Republic of the Congo	26 June 1960	Date diplomatic relations established. Ties severed on 4 October 1973, but restored on 13 May 1982.
40	Denmark	12 July 1950	De facto recognition on 2 February 1949.
41	Dominica	January 1978	Date diplomatic relations established
42	Dominican Republic	29 December 1948	
43	Timor-Leste	29 August 2002	
44	Ecuador	2 February 1949	
45	Egypt	26 March 1979	Signatory to the Khartoum Resolution. De facto recognition on 19 November 1977. Later became the first Arab state to recognize Israel, with the Egypt–Israel peace treaty.
46	El Salvador	11 September 1948	
47	Equatorial Guinea		Relations severed in October 1973, but resumed in January 1994.
48	Eritrea	6 May 1993	Date diplomatic relations established
49	Estonia	9 January 1992	Date diplomatic relations established
50	Eswatini	September 1968	
51	Ethiopia	24 October 1961	Prior to de jure recognition, Ethiopia maintained consular relations with Israel since 1956. Relations were broken in October 1973, but resumed in November 1989.
52	Micronesia	23 November 1988	Date diplomatic relations established
53	Fiji	August 1970	Date diplomatic relations established
54	Finland	18 March 1949	De facto recognition on 11 June 1948.
55	France	24 January 1949	
56	Gabon		Relations severed in October 1973, but resumed in September 1993.
57	Gambia		Relations severed in October 1973, but resumed in September 1992
58	Georgia	1 June 1992	Date diplomatic relations established
59	Germany	12 May 1965	Date diplomatic relations established. Prior to this, Germany de facto recognized Israel on 10 September 1952 and signed the reparations agreement with Israel. East Germany never had diplomatic relations with Israel during its existence.
60	Ghana		Relations broken in October 1973, but resumed in August 1994
61	Greece	21 May 1990	Date diplomatic relations established/ De facto recognition on 15 March 1949.
62	Grenada	January 1975	Date diplomatic relations established
63	Guatemala	19 May 1948	
64	Guinea		Broke diplomatic relations with Israel on 12 June 1967, but restored relations on July 20, 2016.
65	Guinea-Bissau	March 1994	Date diplomatic relations established
66	Guyana		Broke off relations in March 1974, restored in March 1992.
67	Haiti	January 1950	Date diplomatic relations established. De facto recognition on 26 February 1949.
68	Honduras	8 November 1948	De facto recognition on 11 September 1948.
69	Hungary	1 June 1948	De facto recognition on 24 May 1948. Relations broken in 1967, but restored on 19 September 1989.
70	Iceland		De facto recognition on 11 February 1949.
71	India	17 September 1950	
72	Ireland	May 1963	De facto recognition on 12 February 1949.
73	Italy	19 January 1950	De facto recognition on 8 February 1949.
74	Côte d'Ivoire	24 May 1961	Date diplomatic relations established. Prior to this date, it had maintained trade relations since 15 February 1961. Relations severed in November 1973, but resumed in February 1986.
75	Jamaica	29 August 1962	Date diplomatic relations established
76	Japan	15 May 1952	
77	Jordan	26 October 1994	Signatory to the Khartoum Resolution. Recognized Israel in the Israel–Jordan peace treaty.
78	Kazakhstan	10 April 1992	Date diplomatic relations established
79	Kenya	December 1963	Severed relations in November 1973, resumed in December 1988.
80	Kiribati	21 May 1984	Date diplomatic relations established
81	Kyrgyzstan	March 1992	
82	Laos	February 1957	Date diplomatic relations established. Laos broke off relations in 1973, but restored them on 6 December 1993.
83	Latvia	6 January 1992	Date diplomatic relations established
84	Lesotho		
85	Liberia		De facto recognition on 11 February 1949. Relations severed in November 1973, but resumed in August 1983.
86	Liechtenstein	January 1992	
87	Lithuania	8 January 1992	Date diplomatic relations established
88	Luxembourg	16 January 1950	De facto recognition on 11 May 1949.
89	Madagascar		Relations severed in October 1973, but resumed in January 1994.
90	Malawi	July 1964	Date diplomatic relations established
91	Maldives	29 October 1965	Diplomatic relations suspended in 1974. Cooperation agreements in 2009 did not develop into full diplomatic relations and were terminated in 2014. Since 15 April 2025, Maldives does not accept Israeli passports for entry into the country.
92	Mali		Diplomatic relations severed 5 January 1973.
93	Malta	December 1965	Date diplomatic relations established. De facto recognition in January 1965.
94	Marshall Islands	16 September 1987	
95	Mauritania	28 October 1999	Diplomatic relations suspended 6 March 2009, severed 21 March 2010.
96	Mauritius		Diplomatic relations severed July 1976, restored September 1993.
97	Mexico	4 April 1952	De facto recognition on 11 May 1949.
98	Moldova	22 June 1992	
99	Monaco	January 1964	
100	Mongolia	2 October 1991	
101	Montenegro	12 July 2006	
102	Morocco	10 December 2020	Closed Israeli office and suspended relations in October 2000. On 10 December 2020, an agreement was announced to normalize relations.
103	Mozambique	23 July 1993	
104	Myanmar	13 July 1953	Date full diplomatic relations established
105	Namibia	11 February 1994	
106	Nauru	December 1994	
107	Nepal	1 June 1960	Date diplomatic relations established. First South Asian nation to establish diplomatic ties with Israel.
108	Netherlands	16 January 1950	De facto recognition on 11 May 1949.
109	New Zealand	28 July 1950	De facto recognition on 29 January 1949.
110	Nicaragua	18 May 1948	Diplomatic relations suspended June 2010, but restored in March 2017. Relations suspended again in October 2024.
111	Niger		Relations severed on 4 January 1973.
112	Nigeria	1960	Relations broken in October 1973, were resumed in May 1992.
113	North Macedonia	7 December 1995	Date diplomatic relations established
114	Norway	4 February 1949	Date Norway recognized Israel
115	Palau	2 October 1994	
116	Panama	19 June 1948	
117	Papua New Guinea	1978	
118	Paraguay	7 September 1948	
119	Peru	9 February 1949	
120	Philippines	13 May 1957	De facto recognition on 11 May 1949.
121	Poland	18 May 1948	Relations were broken in 1967, restored in February 1990.
122	Portugal	12 May 1977	
123	Republic of the Congo	9 November 1960	Date diplomatic relations established. Broke relations on 31 December 1972, resumed in August 1991.
124	Romania	12 June 1948	
125	Russia	17 May 1948	Recognition extended as part of the Soviet Union. Relations broken in 1967, restored on 19 October 1991.
126	Rwanda		Relations severed in October 1973, but restored in October 1994.
127	Saint Kitts and Nevis	January 1984	Date diplomatic relations established
128	Saint Lucia	January 1979	Date diplomatic relations established
129	Saint Vincent and the Grenadines	January 1981	Date diplomatic relations established
130	Samoa	June 1977	Date diplomatic relations established
131	San Marino	1 March 1995	
132	Sao Tome and Principe	November 1993	Date diplomatic relations established
133	Senegal	10 November 1960	Date diplomatic relations established. Relations broken in October 1973, but resumed in August 1994.
134	Serbia	31 January 1992	Date diplomatic relations established
135	Seychelles	September 1992	Date diplomatic relations established
136	Sierra Leone		Relations broken in October 1973, but resumed in May 1992.
137	Singapore	11 May 1969	Date diplomatic relations established
138	Slovakia	18 May 1948	Recognition extended under Czechoslovakia. Relations under Czechoslovakia were severed between June 1967 and February 1990. Diplomatic relations with Slovakia were established 1 January 1993.
139	Slovenia	28 April 1992	
140	Solomon Islands	January 1989	
141	South Africa	14 May 1949	
142	South Korea	10 April 1962	Date diplomatic relations established
143	South Sudan	28 July 2011	Date given is the date full diplomatic relations were established.
144	Spain	17 January 1986	
145	Sri Lanka	16 September 1950	
146	Suriname	February 1976	
147	Sweden	13 June 1950	De facto recognition on 15 February 1949.
148	Switzerland	18 March 1949	De facto recognition on 28 January 1949.
149	Tajikistan	April 1992	
150	Tanzania		Relations broken in October 1973, but resumed in February 1995.
151	Thailand	26 September 1950	
152	Togo		Relations severed in September 1973, but restored in June 1987.
153	Tonga	June 1977	Date diplomatic relations established
154	Trinidad and Tobago	31 August 1962	Date diplomatic relations established
155	Turkey	12 March 1950	De facto recognition on 28 March 1949. Downgraded ties with Israel to second-secretary level in September 2011, but restored full diplomatic relations in June 2016.
156	Turkmenistan	6 October 1993	Date diplomatic relations established
157	Tuvalu	July 1984	Date diplomatic relations established
158	Uganda		Broke relations on 30 March 1972, but restored in July 1994.
159	Ukraine	26 December 1991	De facto recognition on 11 May 1949.
160	United Arab Emirates	15 September 2020	On 15 September 2020, an agreement was signed to normalize relations.
161	United Kingdom	28 April 1950	De facto recognition on 13 May 1949.
162	United States	31 January 1949	First country to formally recognize Israel. De facto recognition on 14 May 1948.
163	Uruguay	19 May 1948	First Latin American country to recognize Israel.
164	Uzbekistan	21 February 1992	Date full diplomatic relations established
165	Venezuela	27 June 1948	Relations severed in January 2009. Consular relations resumed in August 2026. Full diplomatic relations yet to be established.
166	Vanuatu	16 December 1993	Date diplomatic relations established
167	Vietnam	12 July 1993	Date diplomatic relations established
168	Zambia		Relations broken in October 1973, but resumed in December 1991.
169	Zimbabwe	26 November 1993	Date diplomatic relations established

=== Non-UN member states ===
#	State	Date of recognition or establishment of diplomatic relations	Notes
1	Cook Islands	2008	
2	Holy See	15 June 1994	
3	Kosovo	4 September 2020	Kosovo recognised Israel as part of the Kosovo and Serbia economic normalization agreements (2020). Diplomatic relations established on February 1, 2021.
4	Niue	2008	
5	Palestine	1993	Signatory to the Khartoum Resolution. Recognized Israel as part of the Oslo I Accord
6	Somaliland	26 December 2025	Israel became the first country and UN member state to formally recognize Somaliland as an independent and sovereign state. Both states agreed to establish full diplomatic relations, including opening embassies in their respective capitals.
7	Taiwan	1 March 1949	Israel and Taiwan maintain close relations, though Israel does not formally recognize Taiwan as a country.

== States that do not recognize Israel ==
#	State	Notes
1	Afghanistan	In 2021, Afghanistan reiterated that it would not recognize Israel. Does not accept Israeli passports. Holders of passports containing any Israeli visa or stamp will be refused entry.
2	Algeria	Algeria does not recognize Israeli statehood. (Note: Signatory of the 1967 Khartoum Resolution, which denounces the recognition of Israeli statehood.) Does not accept Israeli passports.
3	Bangladesh	Bangladesh does not recognize Israel. Does not accept Israeli passports, and Bangladeshi passports are not valid for travel to Israel.
4	Brunei	Brunei does not recognize Israel. Does not accept Israeli passports, and Brunei passports are not valid for travel to Israel.
5	Comoros	Comoros does not recognize Israel. In 1994, Comoros signed an agreement with Israel to exchange recognition on the condition that "a full Middle East peace is reached".
6	Djibouti	Djibouti does not recognize Israel.
7	Indonesia	Indonesia does not recognize Israel. Does not accept Israeli passport holders without an invitation from the Directorate General of Immigration. Holders of passport can only enter Indonesia through airports in Denpasar (DPS), Jakarta (CGK/HLP), and Surabaya (SUB).
8	Iran	Voted against the UN Partition Plan and voted against the admission of Israel's membership to the UN. Iranian government de facto recognized Israel in 1950 but refrained from recognizing it de jure. Relations severed on 18 February 1979. Does not accept Israeli passports, and the holders of Iranian passports are "not entitled to travel to the occupied Palestine" Holders of passports containing any Israeli visa or stamp will be refused entry.
9	Iraq	Iraq does not recognize Israel. Does not accept Israeli passports, except for Kurdistan Region where visa is required for passengers without a signed and stamped letter issued by the Ministry of Interior of the Kurdistan Regional Government if arriving at Erbil (EBL) and Sulaymaniyah (ISU). Iraqi passports are not valid for travel to Israel. Holders of passports containing any Israeli visa or stamp will be refused entry.
10	Kuwait	Kuwait does not recognize Israel. Does not accept Israeli passports. Holders of passports containing any Israeli visa or stamp will be refused entry. Maintains a state of hostility dating back to 1967.
11	Lebanon	Lebanon does not recognize Israel. Lebanon briefly recognized Israel in 1983–1984 under the May 17 Agreement, though this agreement was soon revoked. Does not accept Israeli passports. Holders of passports containing any Israeli visa or stamp will be refused entry.
12	Libya	Libya does not recognize Israeli statehood. Does not accept Israeli passports. Holders of passports containing any Israeli visa or stamp will be refused entry.
13	Malaysia	Malaysia does not recognize Israel. Does not admit Israeli passport holders without written permission from the government. Malaysian passports not valid for travel to Israel without permission from the government.
14	North Korea	North Korea does not recognize Israel. Israeli tourists have been able to visit North Korea since 2017. The two countries held talks in 1993, but the talks were halted under pressure from the United States. (See Israel–North Korea relations for more details.)
15	Oman	Oman does not recognize Israel. A degree of relations established in January 1996. Closed Israeli office and suspended relations in October 2000. In 2018, the Omani foreign minister acknowledged that "Israel is a state present in the region, and we all understand this." Accepts Israeli passports for transit only, does not accept for admission.
16	Pakistan	Pakistan does not recognize Israel. Does not accept Israeli passports, and Pakistani passports are not valid for travel to Israel.
17	Qatar	Qatar does not recognize Israel. In April 1996, Qatar and Israel agreed to exchange trade representation offices. Trade offices closed in February 2009. Does not accept Israeli passports for admission in Qatar, except during the 2022 FIFA World Cup. Qatar has hosted Israeli delegations for negotiations between Israel and Hamas during the Gaza war to facilitate ceasefires in the war. Their position is sometimes considered to be a "de facto recognition" since the 1990s. The ministry of foreign affairs advocates for the establishment of a Palestinian state with the 1967 borders and East Jerusalem as its capital.
—	Sahrawi Republic	The Sahrawi Republic refers to Israel as a non-state "entity". Israel similarly does not recognize the Sahrawi Republic.
18	Saudi Arabia	Saudi Arabia does not recognize Israel. Does not accept Israeli passports, however there are some exceptions. Israeli Muslims may get a temporary Jordanian passport to enter the country for Hajj or Umrah purposes only and since 2020, Israeli businesspeople can obtain a special visa in order to enter the country.
19	Somalia	Somalia does not recognize Israeli statehood.
20	Sudan	On 23 October 2020, an agreement was announced to normalize relations. In February 2023, a deal was reached to normalize relations between Israel and Sudan. However, it was suspended indefinitely due to the outbreak of the Sudanese civil war, as well as broader regional conflicts such as the Gaza War.
21	Syria	Syria does not recognize Israel. Does not accept Israeli passports. Holders of passports containing any Israeli visa or stamp will be refused entry.
22	Tunisia	Tunisia does not recognize Israel. Low-level relations established in 1994. Joint declaration of relations made in January 1996. Closed the Israeli representative office and suspended relations in October 2000.
23	Yemen	Yemen does not recognize Israel. Does not accept Israeli passports. Holders of passports containing any Israeli visa or stamp will be refused entry.

== See also ==
- Borders of Israel
- Foreign relations of Israel
- International recognition of Palestine
- Zionist regime
- List of states with limited recognition
- Right to exist
- Self-determination
- Visa requirements for Israeli citizens
