= Embassy of the United Kingdom, Tel Aviv =

Coordinates: 32.0878°N 34.7715°E

British Embassy, Tel Aviv
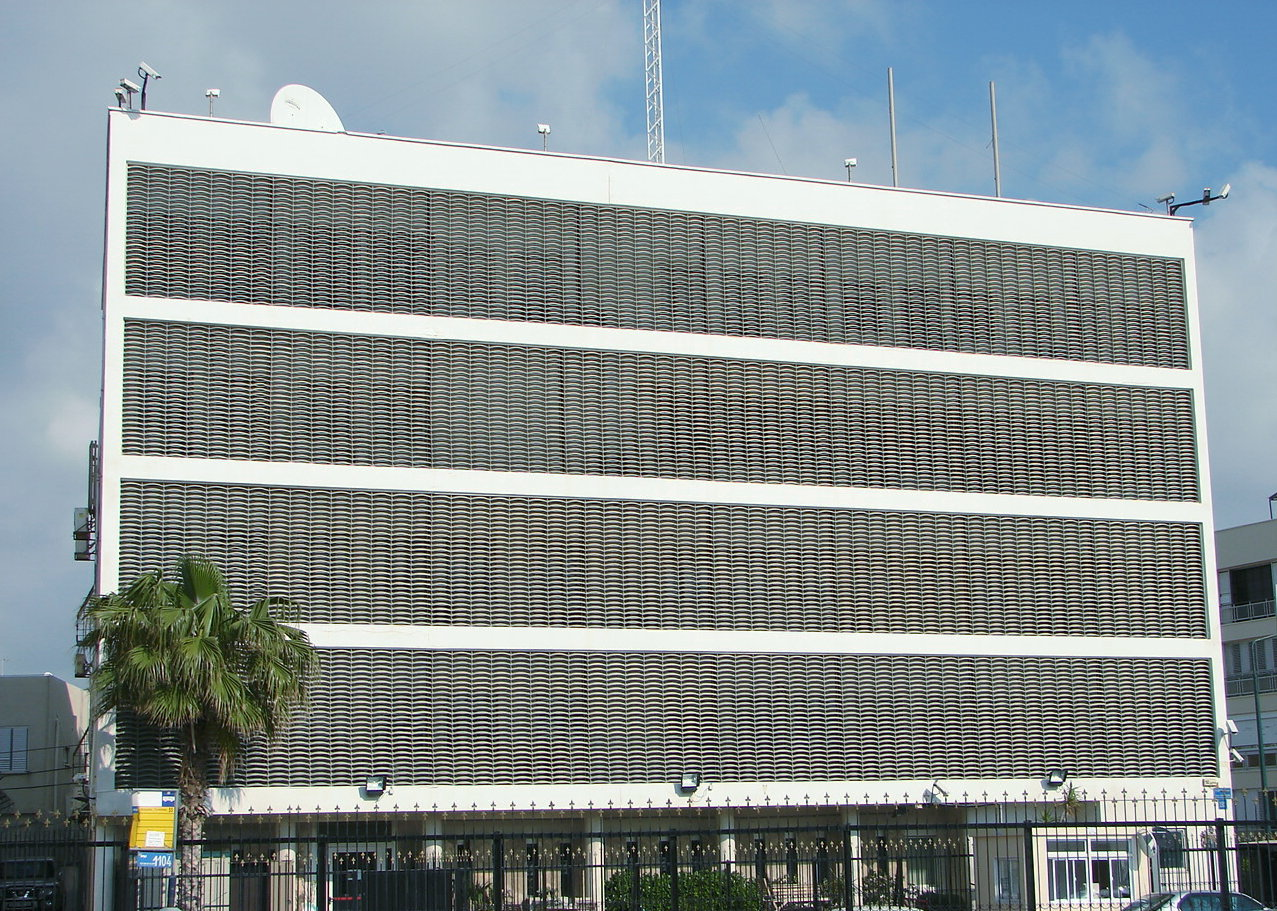
- The Embassy building in Tel Aviv
- Location: Tel Aviv, Israel
- Address: 192 Hayarkon Street, 6340502 Tel Aviv, Israel
- Ambassador: Simon Walters
- Website: British Embassy, Tel Aviv

The Embassy of the United Kingdom (commonly referred to as the British Embassy) in Tel Aviv is the chief diplomatic mission of the United Kingdom in Israel. It was established in 1949.

== History ==
The British Embassy in Tel Aviv was founded in 1949, following the end of British rule over Israel during the British Mandate in 1948. It is located on Hayarkon Street in the Old North area of the city. Simon Walters has been British Ambassador to Israel since August 2023.

The United Kingdom also maintains a Consulate-General in East Jerusalem, with a Consul-General not being accredited to any state, as "an expression of [the UK] view that no state has sovereignty over Jerusalem". In 2026, following British Labour government announcing sanctions on Israeli settlements in the West Bank, the Israeli government announced the Consulate-General in Jerusalem would be closed. Following negotiations, it was agreed that the consulate would remain open but would be downgraded to a Mission and would be manned by a smaller staff. The United Kingdom also has an honorary consul in Eilat.

In 2009, the United Kingdom planned to move the British Embassy to the Kirya Tower. However, the Foreign Office dropped these plans because the building is part-owned by Africa-Israel Investments Ltd, a company which has built in the Palestinian territories. Israel's ambassador to London said the decision was "appeasement to those who slander Israel". In 2022, the British Prime Minister, Liz Truss considered moving the Embassy to Jerusalem. However, later in the year, her successor Rishi Sunak announced that the Embassy would be remaining in Tel Aviv.

== See also ==
- Israel–United Kingdom relations
- List of diplomatic missions in Israel
- List of Ambassadors of the United Kingdom to Israel
