= North Korea–Palestine relations =

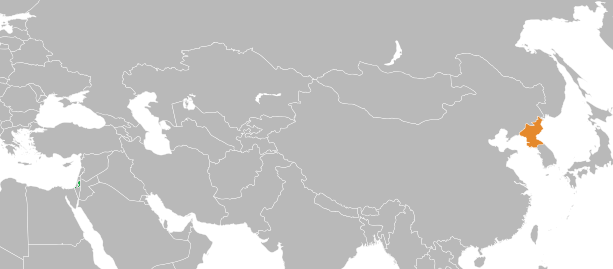

- Palestine: North Korea

North Korea–Palestine relations

Korean name
- Chosŏn'gŭl: 팔레스티나-조선민주주의인민공화국 관계

Arabic name
- Arabic: العلاقات الفلسطينية الكورية الشمالية

North Korea–Palestine relations are the bilateral relations between North Korea and Palestine. Since 1988, North Korea has recognized the State of Palestine and supported the two-state solution with the founding an independent Palestinian state with East Jerusalem as its capital. Israel also regards South Korea as the sole legitimate government of the Korean Peninsula and has never recognized North Korea. North Korea does not recognize Israel and regards it as an "imperialist satellite state" of the United States.

== History ==
North Korea's relations with the Palestine Liberation Organization began in 1966. Kim Il Sung and Yasser Arafat had a very close relationship and North Korea provided aid to the Palestinians. North Korean support for the PLO began in the 1970s and included the supply of small amounts of arms and military aid. North Korean arms in the Middle East included aid to several leftist factions and revolutionary movements such as the PLO and the Popular Front for the Liberation of Palestine and the Democratic Front for the Liberation of Palestine. North Korean arms and aid to Palestinian factions continued until the opening up of China under Deng Xiaoping and political reforms in the Soviet Union under Mikhail Gorbachev during the 1980s.

After the fall of the Soviet Union, North Korean involvement in the Palestinian-Israeli conflict declined and North Korea shifted from the exporting of revolution to pragmatism. Since then North Korea has continued to support the Palestinian cause and has strongly condemned every Israeli action in the region. During the Gaza War (2008–09), North Korea harshly condemned Israeli actions. A Foreign Ministry spokesman denounced the killing of unarmed civilians and called it a crime against humanity as well as a threat to the Middle East Peace Process. On the floor of the UN General Assembly the North Korean permanent representative Sin Son-ho said that North Korea "fully supported Palestinians’ struggle to expel Israeli aggressors from their Territory and restore their right to self-determination."

After the 2010 Gaza flotilla raid, the North Korean Foreign Ministry called the attack a "crime against humanity" which was perpetrated under the guidance of the United States. The North Korean statement also expressed full support for the self-determination of the Palestinian Arabs.

During the 2014 Israel–Gaza conflict, on 15 July, the Foreign Ministry issued a statement that read: "We bitterly denounce Israel's brutal killings of many defenseless Palestinians through indiscriminate military attacks on peaceable residential areas in Palestine as they are unpardonable crimes against humanity."

North Korea blamed Israel for the start of the Gaza war. An editorial published in the state-run newspaper Rodong Sinmun stated: "The international community believes that this clash was the result of Israel's constant criminal acts against the Palestinian people, and that the fundamental way out is to build an independent Palestinian state." South Korean intelligence later reported that Kim Jong Un had ordered a "wide range of support" for the Palestinian Arab people.

== See also ==
- North Korea–Israel relations
- Foreign relations of North Korea
- Foreign relations of Palestine
