= Israel–North Korea relations =

- Israel: North Korea

Israel and North Korea do not have official diplomatic relations, and communications between the two countries are hostile. North Korea does not recognise Israel, denouncing it as an "imperialist satellite state" of the United States.

Since 1988, North Korea has viewed the State of Palestine as the sole legitimate government of the historic Palestinian territories, excluding the Israeli controlled Golan Heights, which it believes should be returned to Syria. There are no diplomatic relations between the two countries.

Israel, despite having an unofficial nuclear missile program of its own, considers North Korea and its nuclear missile program a major threat to global security and has called for international action against North Korea. North Korea has responded by threatening to "punish" Israel on several occasions.

== History ==
North Korea sent 20 Korean People's Air Force pilots and 19 non-combat personnel to Egypt during the Yom Kippur War. The unit had four to six encounters with the Israelis from August through the end of the war. According to Shlomo Aloni, the last aerial engagement on the Egyptian front, which took place on 6 December, saw Israeli Air Force F-4s engage North Korean-piloted MiG-21s. The Israelis shot down one MiG, and another was shot down by friendly fire from Egyptian air defences.

Over the years, North Korea has supplied missile and weapons technology to Israel's neighbours, including Iran, Syria, Libya, and Egypt. In 1993, Israeli foreign minister Shimon Peres offered North Korea $1 billion in foreign investment and technical assistance in gold mining operations in exchange for halting the sale of 150 Nodong medium-range ballistic missiles to Iran. The deal was halted under pressure from the United States after North Korea withdrew from the Nuclear Non-Proliferation Treaty. Syria, which has a history of confrontations with Israel, has long maintained a military relationship with North Korea based on the cooperation between their respective nuclear and chemical weapon programs. On 6 September 2007, the Israeli Air Force conducted Operation Outside the Box on a target in the Deir ez-Zor region of Syria. According to media reports, 10 North Koreans who "had been helping with the construction of a nuclear reactor in Syria" were killed during the airstrike.

When North Korea opened up to foreign tourists in 1986, it excluded citizens of Israel along with those of the United States, Japan, Taiwan, and South Africa. Since 2016, Israeli civilians have been permitted to travel to North Korea without intermediaries, with appropriate visas available in Israel.

Israel has called for world action against North Korea's nuclear weapons program. It has been suggested that North Korea has sought to model its nuclear weapons program on Israel's, as "a small-state deterrent for a country surrounded by powerful enemies; to display enough activity to make possession of a nuclear device plausible to the outside world, but with no announcement of possession: in short, to appear to arm itself with an ultimate trump card and keep everyone guessing whether and when the weapons might become available."

In November 1992, following the fall of the Soviet Union, Israel sent a diplomatic delegation to North Korea, but the efforts were stopped by then-Israeli Prime Minister Yitzhak Rabin, possibly due to United States and Mossad pressure.

In May 2010, the Israeli foreign minister, Avigdor Lieberman, labelled North Korea as part of an "axis of evil", stating, "This axis of evil that includes North Korea, Syria and Iran; it's the biggest threat to the entire world".

In 2014 as the Israel–Gaza conflict escalated, North Korea allegedly negotiated arms deals with Hamas. This was, however, denied by North Korean KCNA state television a few days later.

In a 2017 interview with Hebrew language news site Walla, Israeli defence minister Avigdor Lieberman called Kim Jong Un a "madman ... bent on undermining international stability." North Korean state media soon found out about the interview and issued a statement warning Israelis to watch their "wicked behavior", promising "merciless, thousand-fold punishment" for insulting the "dignity of the Supreme Leadership."

North Korea blamed Israel for the start of the Israel-Hamas war; an editorial published in the state-run newspaper Rodong Sinmun stated: "The international community believes that this clash was the result of Israel's constant criminal acts against the Palestinian people, and that the fundamental way out is to build an independent Palestinian state." South Korean intelligence later reported that Kim Jong Un had ordered a "wide range of support" for the Palestinian people.

== North Korean meeting with Mossad and the Israeli Ministry of Foreign Affairs ==
Israel–North Korea relations are, as Aron Shai wrote in the Israel Journal of Foreign Affairs, "perhaps the most estranged 'non-relations'" in the international community. This estrangement and disconnect is best categorized by an event in which North Korea invited the Mossad and the Ministry of Foreign Affairs in 1992 in two separate delegations. The event passed, and neither party knew the other was there. This disconnect and stealth in relations is in part due to Israel's relations with South Korea, which are much more normalized due to Israeli aid during the Korean War.

According to Shai, the director general of the Ministry of Foreign Affairs, Eytan Bentsur, was optimistic in his meeting with North Korea. In exchange for arms deals to Israel, North Korea wanted Israel's help to make negotiations with the U.S. prevail. The deal soon turned into a mutually beneficial relationship: North Korea wanted aid and investment and Israel wanted North Korea to stop supplying missiles to Iran. The deal seemed likely, but in 1993, North Korea pulled out of the Treaty on the Non-Proliferation of Nuclear Weapons. Efraim Halevy, who was representing Mossad, on the other hand, wanted to emphatically end relations with North Korea and enhance Israel's relationship with South Korea instead. North Korea's exit from this agreement increased the Mossad's pressure on the MFA to end the agreement.

While the relationship between the two countries appears frozen, the events that transpired during that demarche have strong implications. First, the disconnect of policy between the Mossad and the MFA was revealed. As Shai writes, "there was obviously no coordination between the two institutions, and one wonders whether this actually undermined Israel's strategic interests". Second, however, U.S. intervention and strong influence in whether to pursue a foreign policy relationship with North Korea divided the Israeli government. While some diplomats argued that the U.S. is more equipped to deal with North Korean relations and being Israel's biggest ally, should have a voice in decisions, many diplomats (including Bentsur), argued that the U.S. was taking away Israel's right of self-governance.

== See also ==
- Foreign relations of Israel
- Israel–South Korea relations
- Foreign relations of North Korea
- North Korea–Palestine relations
- North Korea–South Korea relations
- Iran–North Korea relations
- Iran–Israel relations
