= Israel–South Korea relations =

- Israel: South Korea

Diplomatic mission
- Embassy of Israel, Seoul: Embassy of South Korea, Tel Aviv

Israel–South Korea relations are the diplomatic, commercial and cultural ties between the State of Israel and the Republic of Korea. South Korea has maintained relations with Israel since 1948, and in 1962 both states initiated official diplomatic relations. Israel and South Korea have expressed interest in strengthening the relationship in all areas, particularly defence, but also renewable energy, science and technology, and bilateral trade. Israel and South Korea signed a free trade agreement in 2021.

Since 1988, North Korea has recognized the Palestine as the sole legitimate government of the historic Palestinian territories, excluding the Golan Heights under Israeli control. In contrast, Israel only recognizes South Korea as the sole legitimate government of the Korean Peninsula and has never recognized North Korea.

== Early history ==
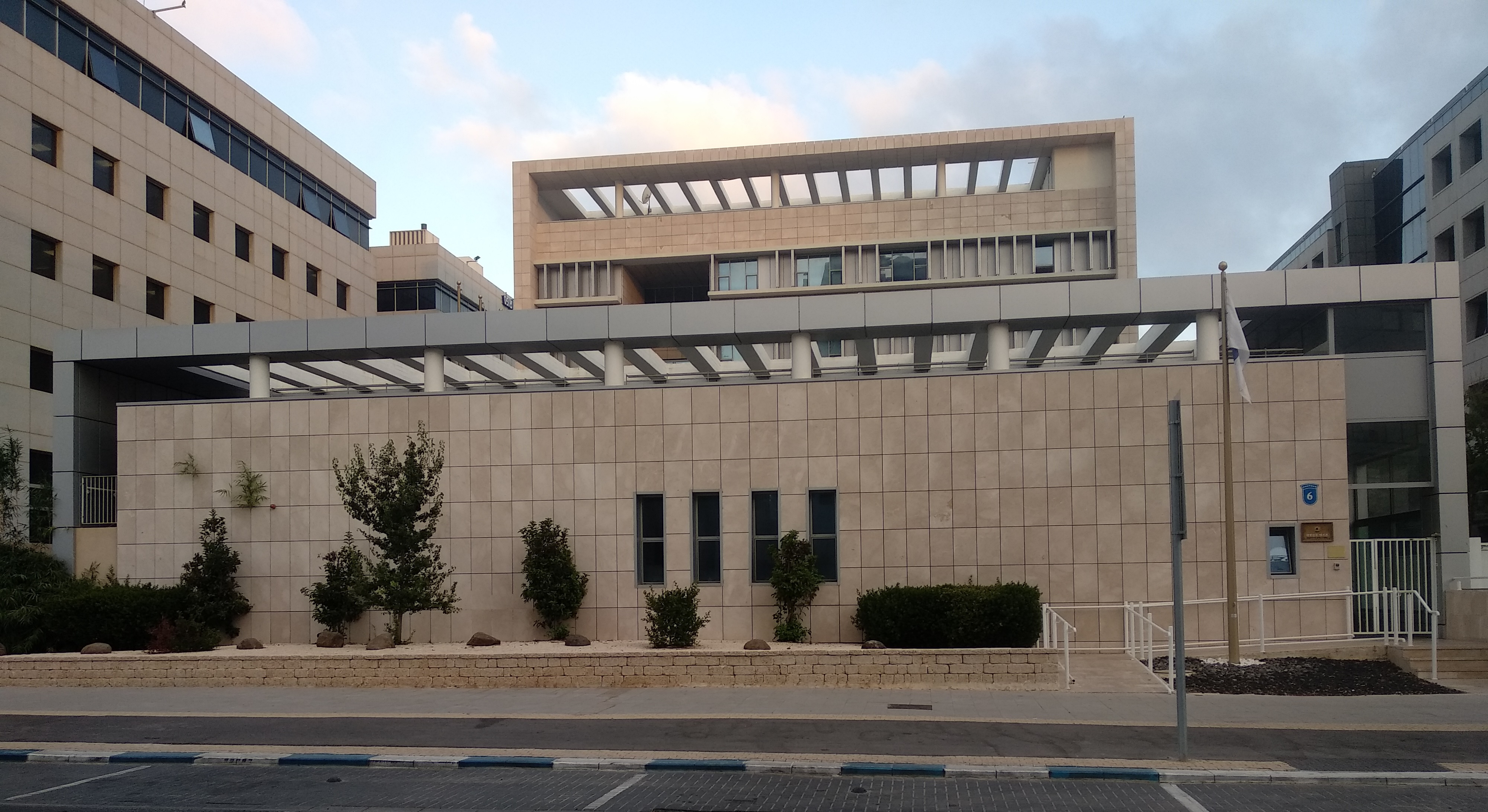
Embassy of South Korea in Herzliya

Korea and Israel established official diplomatic relations on April 10, 1962. However, relations began immediately following the outbreak of the Korean War in 1950. David Ben-Gurion, the Israeli Prime Minister at the time, supported sending Israeli troops to join UN forces in Korea. However, the then-ruling party Mapai was opposed to such measures as it favoured relations with North Korea over the South. As a compromise, instead of sending troops, the government sent $100,000 in medical and food supplies to the South Korean government.

The resolution of the Korean War strengthened relations between Israel and South Korea. Israel shifted its founding foreign policy of non-identification with aligning itself with the United States and United Nations. The relationship started less than two years after the founding of both nations.

== Historic relations ==
Israel opened its embassy in Seoul in August 1964. Israel aided South Korea in establishing infrastructure in areas of agriculture, water, and security industry. The South Korean Army purchased large amounts of Israeli weapons, including Uzis. In 1966, delegations from both nations visited each other.

In February 1978, the Israeli government closed its embassy in Seoul. The 1973 oil crisis and 1979 oil crisis influenced South Korea government's policies towards Israel. Temporarily, South Korea began to favour the neighbours of Israel over the state of Israel.

Following a period of normalized and cooled relations between Israel and its neighbors, South Korea approved the reopening of the Israeli embassy in 1992. The two countries soon after signed agreements to fortify cooperation in the aircraft industry and the Weizmann Institute.

On April 10, 2026, South Korean President Lee Jae Myung shared a post on his X account containing a 2024 video of Israel Defense Forces soldiers throwing a Palestinian person from a building by criticizing Israel and saying "There is no difference from the forced mobilization of comfort women, the Holocaust, or wartime killings that we take issue with". On May 20, Lee criticized Israel's seizure of the Gaza Freedom Flotilla, questioning the legal basis of the seizure. Regarding the Gaza war, Lee questioned "Isn't it an illegal invasion under international law?" and called Israeli Prime Minister Benjamin Netanyahu a "war criminal", while calling in the South Korean government to make a judgement on whether to issue an arrest warrant for Netanyahu in accordance with the arrest warrant issued by the International Criminal Court.

== Economic relations ==
Trade between Israel and South Korea grew by a factor of six, from $148 million to about $1 billion between 1990 and 2000. Within ten years, South Korea controlled 15 percent of the Israeli market in imported automobiles and 20 percent of that for cellular telephones. Israeli exports to South Korea also grew exponentially during the same time period.

In 2001, South Korea and Israel signed a joint-agreement to establish a Research and Development fund for the purpose of developing new products.

Since the summer of 2010, an annual event, Korea Business Conference, aimed at increasing business activity between Israel and Korea, including trade, investment, and business partnerships. The conference was initiated by Itzik Yona, CEO of Yonaco Group, in cooperation with the Israel Export Institute. One of the major consequences of the conference is to increase awareness of the possibility of mutual investments between the two countries. Among other things, as a direct result of the Conference, for the first time a Korean venture capital fund invested for the first time in an Israeli venture company from Rehovot.

In August 2010, Korea Venture Investment Corp. (KVIC), a state-backed fund management company, signed a memorandum of understanding with Israel's Vertex Venture Capital (VVC) to raise a US$150 million fund, which will be used to finance joint ventures or the merger and acquisition of small and mid-size venture firms in the two countries.

In 2011, an 11-member parliamentary delegation met with Israeli President Shimon Peres at the King David Hotel in Jerusalem. The delegation was led by Lee Byung-suk, former chairman of the National Assembly's Land Transport and Maritime Affairs Committee. Also present was Park Jin, former chairman of the Foreign Affairs and Trade Committee.

On November 11, 2013, Korean Ambassador in Israel Kim Il-soo announced that Israel and South Korea could become an economic powerhouse, referring to hi-tech cooperation between the countries. The announcement was issued during the First Creative Economy Forum between Korea and Israel held in Tel Aviv, which featured the exposure of the Korea-Israel Hi-Tech Network - a project aimed to increase industrial collaborations in various hi-tech fields.

In October 2017, the Israel Innovation Authority published a report recommending deeper cooperation between the two countries' tech sectors given complementary advantages between the two economies. “By virtue of the complementary comparative advantages between Israeli and Korean innovation, great commercial potential exists at the point of interface between the two countries."

Israel and South Korea signed a free trade agreement in August 2019, Israel's first free trade agreement with an East Asian country and South Korea's first tariff-free agreement with a Middle Eastern nation. This agreement took effect by the end of 2022.

Israel - Korea trade in millions USD-$
| | Israel imports South Korea exports | South Korea imports Israel exports | Total trade value |
|---|---|---|---|
| 2023 | 2511.4 | 1085.7 | 3597.1 |
| 2022 | 2796.6 | 1304.2 | 4100.8 |
| 2021 | 2251.7 | 1153.7 | 3405.4 |
| 2020 | 1692.7 | 787.7 | 2480.4 |
| 2019 | 1624.6 | 706.4 | 2331 |
| 2018 | 1515.5 | 970.1 | 2485.6 |
| 2017 | 1141.9 | 886.3 | 2028.2 |
| 2016 | 1316.3 | 580 | 1896.3 |
| 2015 | 1138.2 | 575.2 | 1713.4 |
| 2014 | 1357.2 | 627.8 | 1985 |
| 2013 | 1513 | 594 | 2107 |
| 2012 | 1663 | 700.7 | 2363.7 |
| 2011 | 1607.7 | 724.1 | 2331.8 |
| 2010 | 1100.7 | 850.3 | 1951 |
| 2009 | 871.1 | 841 | 1712.1 |
| 2008 | 1103.2 | 818.5 | 1921.7 |
| 2007 | 945.4 | 746.1 | 1691.5 |
| 2006 | 893.6 | 650 | 1543.6 |
| 2005 | 852.7 | 449.8 | 1302.5 |
| 2004 | 759.9 | 417.7 | 1177.6 |
| 2003 | 579.8 | 286.9 | 866.7 |
| 2002 | 512.4 | 317.2 | 829.6 |

== Military relations ==
Israel has sold drones to South Korea, including the Harpy UAV. South Korea was competing with Italy's Alenia Aermacchi M-346 Master in a tender to supply training aircraft to the Israeli Defence Forces. The Korean Airforce had accused Israel of giving Italy preferred treatment since negotiations began. In January 2012, the South Korean government offered its final industrial cooperation package in a bid to get the Israeli Defence Ministry to select Korean Aerospace Industries’ T-50 Golden Eagle as its next fighter trainer. Israeli Defence Ministry Chief of Staff Udi Shani flew to South Korea for talks about the purchase. The deal was reported worth over $1 billion. The Italians were the eventual winners, in a decision likely to upset South Korea. South Korea had also expressed interest in purchasing Israel's Iron Dome system, but that sale was then seen as under threat. On August 15, 2014, South Korea again expressed their interest in the Iron Dome System.

== Academic relations ==
On June 2024, the Seoul National University opened a research center for Israel studies, dedicated to the study of Jewish civilization and Israeli society.

== COVID-19 outbreak ==
Because of the COVID-19 pandemic, more than 1,000 South Korean tourists were instructed to avoid public places and remain in isolation in their hotels. The Israeli military announced its intention to quarantine South Korean nationals to a military base. Many of the remaining South Koreans were rejected by hotels and were forced to spend nights at Ben Gurion Airport. An Israeli newspaper subsequently published a Korean complaint that "Israel is Treating [Korean and other Asian] Tourists Like Coronavirus". South Korean Foreign Minister Kang Kyung-wha has described Israel's response as "excessive". Public health expert Dr. Hagai Levine said that Israeli politicians may be overreaching to impress voters.

In 2021, the two countries approved a deal to transfer 700,000 Pfizer vaccines from Israel to South Korea.

== Public opinion ==
According to a 2025 Pew Research Center survey, 31% of people in South Korea had a favorable view of Israel, while 60% had an unfavorable view; 25% had confidence in Israeli Prime Minister Benjamin Netanyahu, while 64% did not.

== See also ==
- Foreign relations of Israel
- Israel–North Korea relations
