= United Nations Security Council Resolution 69 =

UN Security Council Resolution 69
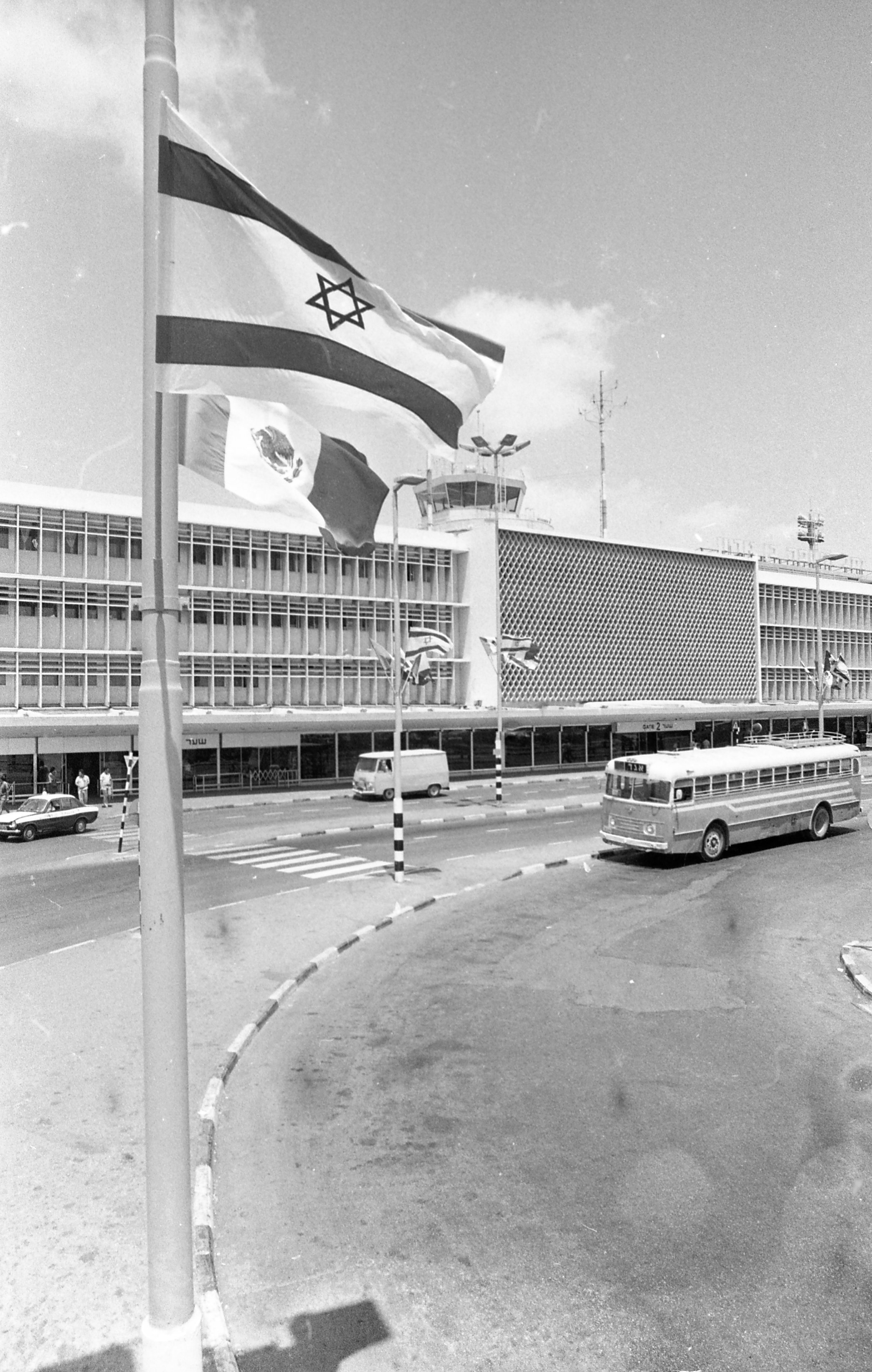
- Israel flag
- Date: 4 March 1949
- Meeting no.: 414
- Code: S/1277 (Document)
- Subject: Admission of new Members to the UN: Israel
- Voting summary: 9 voted for; 1 voted against; 1 abstained
- Result: Adopted

Security Council composition
- Permanent members: China; France; Soviet Union; United Kingdom; United States
- Non-permanent members: Argentina; Canada; Cuba; Egypt; Norway; Ukrainian SSR

United Nations Security Council Resolution 69 was adopted on 4 March 1949. Having received and considered Israel's application for membership in the United Nations, the Security Council decided that in its judgement Israel was a peace-loving state and was able and willing to carry out the obligations contained in the Charter and it therefore recommended to the General Assembly that it grant membership to Israel.

The resolution was adopted by nine votes to one (Egypt), and one abstention from the United Kingdom. Those in favour were China (ROC), France, United States, Soviet Union, Argentina, Canada, Cuba, Norway, and Ukrainian SSR.

On 11 May 1949, meeting the requisite two-thirds majority with a vote of 37 in favour to 12 against, with 9 abstentions, the General Assembly approved Israel's admission to the UN by means of United Nations General Assembly Resolution 273.

== See also ==
- Israel and the United Nations
- List of United Nations Security Council Resolutions 1 to 100 (1946–1953)
