= United Nations General Assembly Resolution 273 =

UN General Assembly Resolution 273
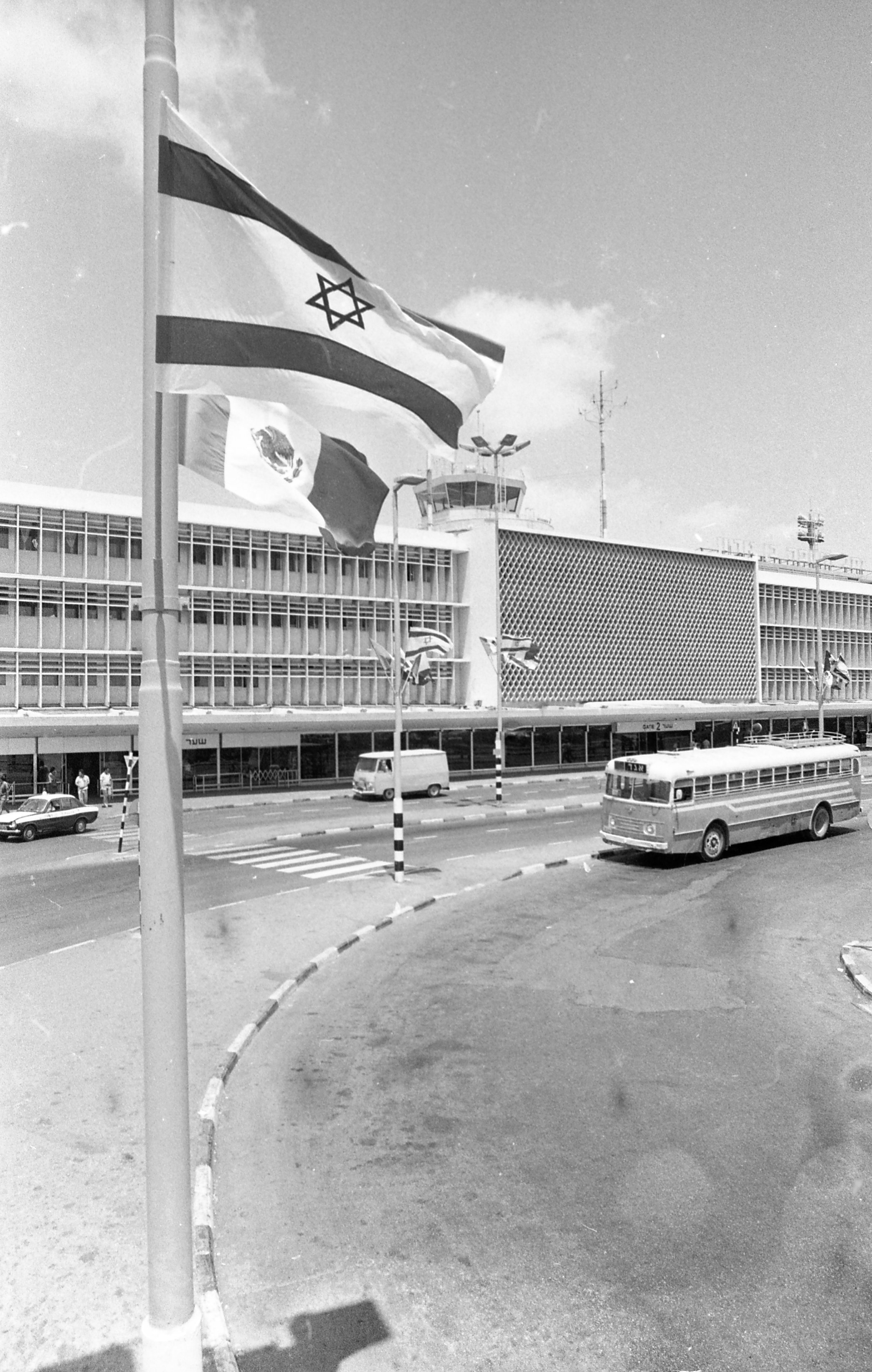
- Israel flag
- Date: May 11 1949
- Code: A/RES/273 (III) (Document)
- Subject: Admission of Israel to membership in the United Nations
- Voting summary: 37 voted for; 12 voted against; 9 abstained
- Result: Adopted

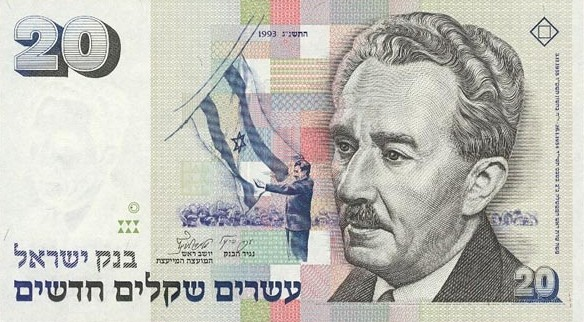
Obverse side of a 20 NIS bill, showing the raising of the Israeli Flag on the UN Building, following the resolution

United Nations General Assembly Resolution 273 was adopted on 11 May 1949 to admit Israel as a United Nations member state. It followed the approval of United Nations Security Council Resolution 69 on 4 March 1949.

Resolution 273 was opened in the second half of the third session of the United Nations General Assembly. It received 37 votes in favour and 12 votes against, with 9 abstentions, thereby fulfilling the requisite two-thirds majority for successful adoption.

== Background ==
In the debates about UN resolution 273 in 1949 about Israel's admittance to the UN, Israel's UN representative Abba Eban promised that the state would honor its obligations under resolution 181 and Resolution 194. El Salvador's representative asked:

I wish to ask the representative of Israel whether he is authorized by his Government to assure the Committee that the State of Israel will do everything in its power to co-operate with the United Nations in order to put into effect (a) the General Assembly resolution of 29 November 1947 on the internationalization of the City of Jerusalem and the surrounding area [resolution 181] and (b) the General Assembly resolution of 11 December 1948 on the repatriation of the refugees [resolution 194].

Eban replied:

I can give unqualified affirmative answer to the second question as to whether we will co-operate with the organs of the United Nations with all the means at our disposal in the fulfillment of the resolution concerning refugees. I cannot honestly conceal from the Committee that even our full co-operation with all the means at our disposal will not avail to solve this question unless it is considered against the general background of the Near East and unless similar co-operation from other neighbouring Governments and a large measure of international assistance are invested in the solution of this problem on a regional basis.

He further added:

The Government of Israel considers and has made it clear that the return of Arab refugees was one of the methods of settling this problem. It considers, as the Conciliation Commission considers and as one of the Governments represented in the United Nations, the opinion of which I quoted this morning seems also to consider, that another method of settling the question would be resettlement of the refugees in neighboring countries. The balance of those resettled in neighboring countries, in comparison with the numbers resettled in Israel, is a matter to be settled by mutual consent after negotiations for which we are immediately prepared.

== Full text ==
Having received the report of the Security Council on the application of Israel for membership in the United Nations,

Noting that, in the judgment of the Security Council, Israel is a peace-loving State and is able and willing to carry out the obligations contained in the Charter,

Noting that the Security Council has recommended to the general Assembly that it admit Israel to membership in the United Nations,

Noting furthermore the declaration by the State of Israel that it "unreservedly accepts the obligations of the United Nations Charter and undertakes to honour them from the day when it becomes a member of the United Nations",

Recalling its resolutions of 29 November 1947 and 11 December 1948 and taking note of the declarations and explanations made by the representative of the Government of Israel before the Ad Hoc Political Committee in respect of the implementation of the said resolutions,

The General Assembly,

Acting in discharge of its functions under Article 4 of the Charter and rule 125 of its rules of procedure,

1. Decides that Israel is a peace-loving State which accepts the obligations contained in the Charter and is able and willing to carry out those obligations;

2. Decides to admit Israel to membership in the United Nations.

___________________

== Voting results ==
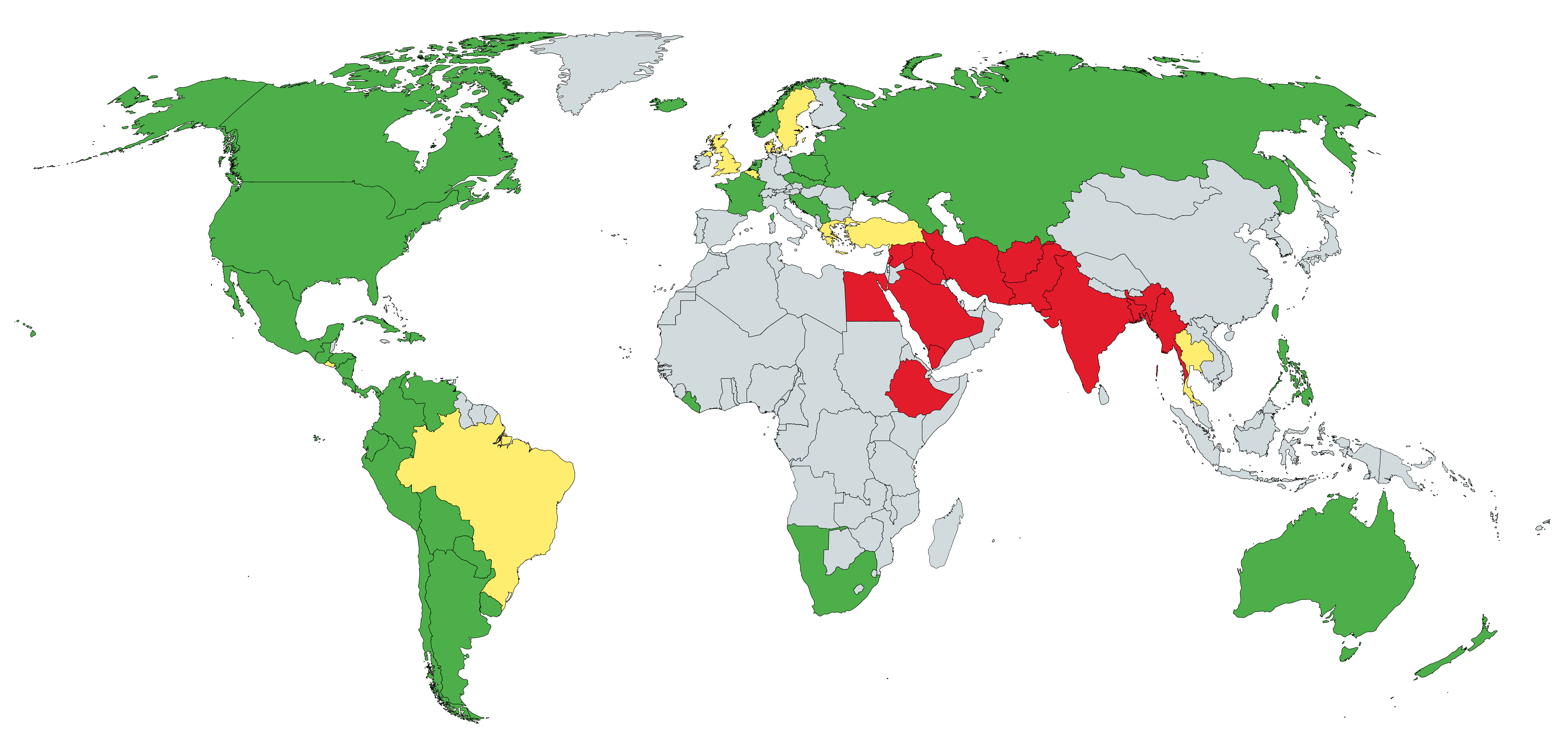
Map of voting results for UNGA Resolution 273 by country (11 May 1949)

The result of the voting was the following:

In favour

Argentina, Australia, Bolivia, Byelorussian SSR, Canada, Chile, China (Republic of), Colombia, Costa Rica, Cuba, Czechoslovakia, Dominican Republic, Ecuador, France, Guatemala, Haiti, Honduras, Iceland, Liberia, Luxembourg, Mexico, Netherlands, New Zealand, Nicaragua, Norway, Panama, Paraguay, Peru, Philippines, Poland, South Africa, Soviet Union, Ukrainian SSR, United States, Uruguay, Venezuela, Yugoslavia.

Against

Afghanistan, Burma, Egypt, Ethiopia, India, Iran, Iraq, Lebanon, Pakistan, Saudi Arabia, Syria, Yemen.

Abstaining

Belgium, Brazil, Denmark, El Salvador, Greece, Siam, Sweden, Turkey, United Kingdom.

== See also ==
- List of United Nations resolutions concerning Israel
- United Nations Partition Plan for Palestine
- United Nations General Assembly Resolution 194

== Sources ==
- Boyle, Francis A. (August 13, 2010). Palestine, Palestinians and International Law. SCB Distributors. pp. 279–. ISBN 978-0-932863-92-8.
