= Simon Walters =

British diplomat

Simon Walters CMG
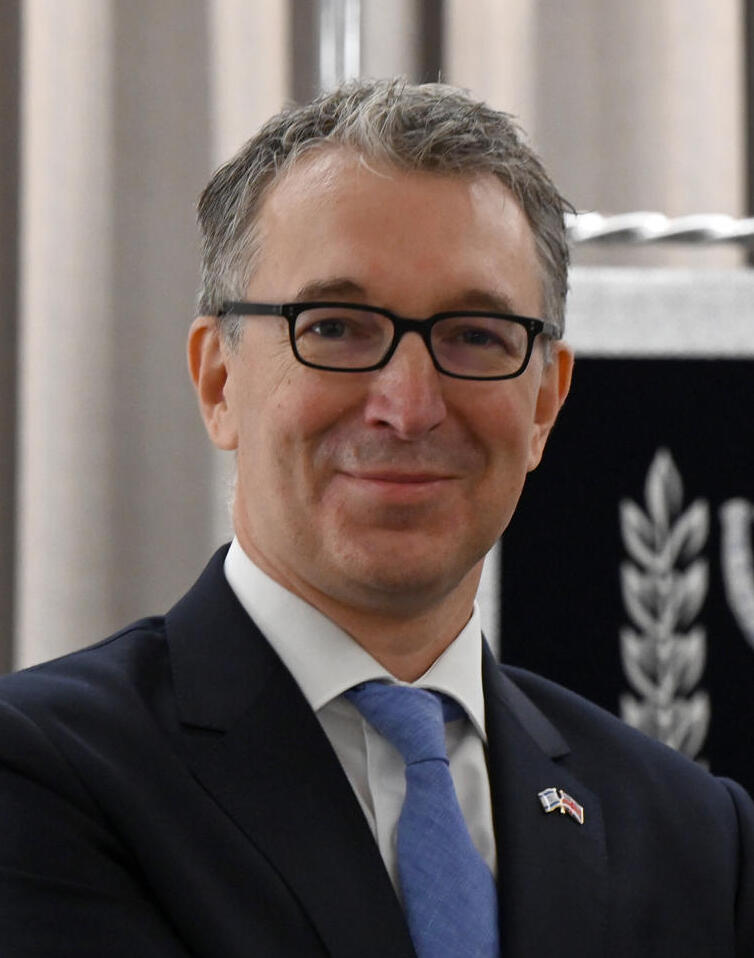
- Walters in 2023

British Ambassador to Israel
- Incumbent
- Assumed office July 2023
- Preceded by: Neil Wigan

Personal details
- Education: University of Oxford (BA)

Simon Walters CMG is a British diplomat. Walters was appointed the British Ambassador to Israel in July 2023.

== Early life and education ==
Walters was educated at Bangor Grammar School in County Down, Northern Ireland from 1984 to 1990. He subsequently attended Oriel College, Oxford and graduated in 1991 with a BA in Politics, Philosophy and Economics.

Walters initially considered a career in policing but decided to pursue a career in diplomacy after receiving no response to his application to the Royal Ulster Constabulary, later remarking that he "would have made a terrible policeman".

== Diplomatic career ==
Previously, Simon was Director National Security for Middle East and Africa at the Foreign, Commonwealth & Development Office (FCDO) from 2019 to 2022. He has also served as Policy and Requirements Director at the Foreign and Commonwealth Office (FCO) from 2017 to 2019, and Regional Lead for South-Eastern Europe in Istanbul from 2016 to 2017.

=== Ambassador to Israel ===
Walters was appointed the British Ambassador to Israel in July 2023.
