= 1956 New Year Honours =

Appointments in many of the Commonwealth realms of Queen Elizabeth II

The New Year Honours 1956 were appointments in many of the Commonwealth realms of Queen Elizabeth II to various orders and honours to reward and highlight good works by citizens of those countries. They were announced on 2 January 1956 to celebrate the year passed and mark the beginning of 1956.

The recipients of honours are displayed here as they were styled before their new honour, and arranged by honour, with classes (Knight, Knight Grand Cross, etc.) and then divisions (Military, Civil, etc.) as appropriate.

== United Kingdom and Commonwealth ==
=== Baron ===
- Colonel John Jacob Astor, DL. For public services.
- Sir (Francis) Raymond Evershed, Master of the Rolls.
- Cyril Forster Garbett, GCVO. Lord Archbishop of York, Primate of England and Metropolitan.
- Sir Frederick Godber, chairman, Shell Transport & Trading Co. Ltd.

=== Baronet ===
- Sir Hubert Stanley Houldsworth, QC, chairman, National Coal Board.
- Colonel James Riley Holt Hutchison, DSO, TD, MP, Member of Parliament for Glasgow Central, 1945–1950, and for the Scotstoun Division of Glasgow since October 1950; Parliamentary Under-Secretary of State and Financial Secretary, War Office, 1951–1954. For political and public services.
- Colonel Charles Edward Ponsonby, TD, DL, Member of Parliament for Sevenoaks, 1935–1950. Chairman, Royal Empire Society. For political and public services.

=== Knight Bachelor ===
- Eric Ashby, President and Vice-Chancellor of Queen's University, Belfast.
- John Garnett Banks, CBE, JP, Lord Provost of Edinburgh.
- Major Arthur Harold Bibby, DSO, DL. For political and public services in Lancashire and Cheshire.
- Major Reginald Bullin, OBE, TD, JP, chairman, Portsmouth Local Employment Committee and Disablement Advisory Committee. Vice-president of the Magistrates' Association.
- Charles Connell, chairman, Charles Connell and Company Ltd, Glasgow.
- Judge Edgar Thorniley Dale, County Court Judge.
- Henry Dalton, CBE, Assistant Commissioner, Metropolitan Police Force.
- Colonel Alan Gomme Gomme-Duncan, MC, MP, Member of Parliament for Perth and Kinross, 1945–1950, and for Perth and East Perthshire since 1950. For political and public services.
- Colonel Bartle Mordaunt Marsham Edwards, MC, JP, DL, chairman, Norfolk County Council.
- Lieutenant-Colonel Fordham Flower, OBE, DL, chairman, Executive Council, Shakespeare Memorial Theatre, Stratford-on-Avon.
- Leslie Ewart Ford, OBE, General Manager, Port of London Authority.
- Alderman Harry Hardy. For political and public services in the West Riding of Yorkshire.
- Ralph George Hawtrey, CB. For services to the study of economics.
- Frank Higginson, CB, CMG, Secretary, Imperial War Graves Commission.
- Eric John Francis James, High Master, Manchester Grammar School.
- Henry Frank Harding Jones, MBE, deputy chairman, Gas Council.
- Brigadier Alexander Herbert Killick, CBE, DSO, MC, Secretary, Royal Institution of Chartered Surveyors.
- Hersch Lauterpacht, QC, lately Whewell Professor of International Law, University of Cambridge.
- William Lyons, chairman and managing director, Jaguar Cars Ltd, Coventry.
- George Matthew McNaughton, CB, Chief Engineer, Ministry of Housing and Local Government.
- Walter Mercer, MB, Professor of Orthopaedic Surgery, University of Edinburgh. President, Royal College of Surgeons, Edinburgh.
- Victor Ewings Negus, MS, FRCS, Consulting Surgeon, Ear, Nose & Throat Department, King's College Hospital.
- George North, CB, MC, Registrar General.
- Tom O'Brien, MP, Member of the General Council of the Trades Union Congress. General Secretary, National Association of Theatrical and Kine Employees.
- Alfred Grenville Pugsley, OBE, Professor of Civil Engineering, University of Bristol.
- Brigadier Ralph Herbert Rayner, Member of Parliament for Totnes, 1935–1955. For political and public services.
- William Walker Frederick Shepherd. For political and public services in Cheshire.
- Brigadier Eric Ommanney Skaife, CB, OBE, DL. For political and public services in Wales.
- Colonel Frederick Claude Stern, OBE, MC. For services to Horticulture.
- John Stewart, CBE, Chairman of Wages Councils.
- Arthur Reginald Astley Weston, CBE, Legal Adviser and Solicitor, Ministry of Agriculture, Fisheries and Food.
- Professor Solly Zuckerman, CB, deputy chairman, Advisory Council on Scientific Policy.

State of South Australia

- George Coutts Ligertwood, a Judge of the Supreme Court, State of South Australia.

State of Victoria

- Francis Palmer Selleck, MC, Lord Mayor of the City of Melbourne, State of Victoria.
- Samuel McMahon Wadham, Professor of Agriculture, University of Melbourne, State of Victoria. For public services.

Overseas Territories

- Kamil Mohamed Ariff bin Kadir Mustan, CBE, JP. For public services in Penang, Federation of Malaya.
- Paul Boffa, OBE, MD. For public services in Malta.
- John Edward Doston Carberry, Chief Justice, Jamaica.
- Joseph Henri Maxime de Comarmond, Chief Justice of the High Courts of Lagos and the Southern Cameroons.
- Gordon Hadow, CMG, OBE, Deputy Governor, Gold Coast.
- Joseph Burtt Hutchinson, CMG, Director, Empire Cotton Growing Corporation's Cotton Research Station, Namulonge, Uganda.
- Ragnar Hyne, Chief Justice, Fiji.
- Thomas Percy Fergus McNeice, CMG, OBE, Chairman of the Committee on Local Government, Singapore.
- Samuel Layinka Ayodeji Manuwa, CMG, OBE, MD, FRCS (Ed.), Chief Medical Adviser to the Federal Government, Nigeria.

=== Order of the Bath ===
==== Knight Grand Cross of the Order of the Bath (GCB) ====
Military Division

- Air Chief Marshal Sir Basil Edward Embry, KCB, KBE, DSO, DFC, AFC, Royal Air Force.

Civil Division

- Sir Harold Corti Emmerson, KCB, KCVO, Permanent Secretary, Ministry of Works. (Permanent Secretary designate, Ministry of Labour and National Service.)

==== Knight Commander of the Order of the Bath (KCB) ====
Military Division

Royal Navy

- Vice-Admiral William Wellclose Davis, CB, DSO.
- Vice-Admiral Maurice Herbert Elliott, CB, CBE.

Army

- Lieutenant-General Sir Francis Wogan Festing, KBE, CB, DSO, (611), late Infantry. Colonel, The Royal Northumberland Fusiliers.
- Lieutenant-General Richard Amyatt Hull, CB, DSO, (36442), late Royal Armoured Corps. Colonel, 17th/21st Lancers.

Royal Air Force

- Acting Air Marshal Lawrence Darvall, CB, MC, Royal Air Force.
- Air Vice-Marshal Douglas Macfadyen, CB, CBE, Royal Air Force.

Civil Division

- Sir Frederick Brundrett, KBE, CB, chairman, Defence Research Policy Committee and Scientific Adviser to the Minister of Defence.
- Sir (John) Gilbert Laithwaite, GCMG, KCIE, CSI, Permanent Under-Secretary of State, Commonwealth Relations Office.
- Air Marshal Sir Robert Henry Magnus Spencer Saundby, KBE, CB, MC, DFC, AFC, Vice-chairman, Council of Territorial and Auxiliary Forces Associations.

==== Companion of the Order of the Bath (CB) ====
Military Division

Royal Navy

- Rear-Admiral Alexander Noel Campbell Bingley, OBE.
- Rear-Admiral Wilfred Geoffrey Brittain, CBE.
- Rear-Admiral Harry Philip Currey, OBE.
- Rear-Admiral Norman Eric Dalton, OBE.
- Instructor Captain Henry Stewart Gracie.
- Surgeon Rear-Admiral Robert Cyril May, OBE, MC, MRCS, LRCP.
- Major-General James Louis Moulton, DSO, OBE.
- Rear-Admiral Arthur Reid Pedder.
- Rear-Admiral Guy Bouchier Sayer, DSC.
- Rear-Admiral Peter Skelton.

Army

- Major-General Victor David Graham Campbell, DSO, OBE, (30818), late Infantry.
- Major-General William Reginald Cox, DSO, (31910), late Infantry.
- Major-General Brian Daunt, CBE, DSO, (17649), late Royal Regiment of Artillery.
- Major-General Frederick Cavendish Hilton-Sergeant, CBE, QHP, MB, (26337), late Royal Army Medical Corps.
- Major-General Reginald Geoffrey Stirling Hobbs, DSO, OBE, (40387), late Royal Regiment of Artillery.
- Major-General Edward Stewart Lindsay, CBE, DSO, (39464), late Royal Regiment of Artillery.
- Major-General David John Muil, OBE, QHDS, LDS, (23169), late Royal Army Dental Corps.
- Major-General Francis Joseph O'Meara, QHP, MD, FRCPI, (26774), late Royal Army Medical Corps.
- Major-General Herbert MacGregor Paterson, CBE, (24859) late Royal Regiment of Artillery.
- Major-General John Christopher Temple Willis, CBE, (19240), late Corps of Royal Engineers.

Royal Air Force

- Air Vice-Marshal Denis Hensley Fulton Barnett, CBE, DFC.
- Air Vice-Marshal Alfred Earle, CBE.
- Air Vice-Marshal William Mary Laurence MacDonald, CBE, DFC.
- Acting Air Vice-Marshal Walter Joseph Martin Akerman, CBE.
- Air Commodore Guy Bearne.
- Air Commodore Gerard John Christopher Paul, DFC.
- Acting Air Commodore Robert Alfred Copsey Carter, DSO, DFC.
- Group Captain James Michael Birkin, DSO, OBE, DFC, AFC, Royal Auxiliary Air Force.

Civil Division

- George Herbert Andrew, Second Secretary, Board of Trade.
- Walter Cawood, CBE, Principal Director of Scientific Research (Air), Ministry of Supply.
- William Charles Milford Couch, CBE, deputy director of Electrical Engineering, Admiralty.
- Harold Haydn Davies, MC, chairman, Welsh Board of Health.
- Colonel Stanley Howe Fisher, MC, TD, DL, chairman, County of London Territorial and Auxiliary Forces Association.
- Bruce Donald Fraser, Under-Secretary, HM Treasury.
- Henry Hardman, Deputy Secretary, Ministry of Agriculture, Fisheries and Food.
- Herbert Harry Hobbs, Assistant Under-secretary of State, War Office.
- Roger Henry Hollis, OBE, attached War Office.
- Frederick Richard Howard, CMG, Assistant Under-Secretary of State, Air Ministry.
- Air Commodore William Edward George Mann, CBE, DFC, Director General of Navigational Services (Civil Aviation), Ministry of Transport and Civil Aviation.
- Edward Rowland Alworth Merewether, CBE, MD, FRCP, Senior Medical Inspector of Factories, Ministry of Labour and National Service.
- William John Richards, CBE, Director, Radar Research Establishment, Ministry of Supply.
- Gilbert Milner Williams, CBE, Under-Secretary, Ministry of Pensions and National Insurance.

=== Order of Saint Michael and Saint George ===
==== Knight Grand Cross of the Order of St Michael and St George (GCMG) ====
- Sir Frederick Robert Hoyer Millar, KCMG, CVO, Her Majesty's Ambassador Extraordinary and Plenipotentiary in Bonn.

==== Knight Commander of the Order of St Michael and St George (KCMG) ====
- Sir Charles John Lowe, Senior Judge of the Supreme Court, State of Victoria.
- Theodore Ouseley Pike, CMG, Governor and Commander-in-Chief, Somaliland.
- Roland Evelyn Turnbull, CMG, Governor and Commander-in-Chief, North Borneo.
- Charles Empson, CMG, Her Majesty's Ambassador Extraordinary and Plenipotentiary in Santiago.
- John Walter Nicholls, CMG, OBE, Her Majesty's Ambassador Extraordinary and Plenipotentiary in Tel Aviv.
- Brigadier Richard Gambier-Parry, CMG, Director of Communications, Foreign Office.
- Francis Brian Anthony Rundall, CMG, OBE, Her Majesty's Consul-General at New York.

==== Companion of the Order of St Michael and St George (CMG) ====
- John Angus Beckett, Assistant Secretary, Ministry of Fuel and Power.
- Gordon Bowen, Senior Trade Commissioner, Ottawa, Board of Trade.
- John Lenox Fisher, Adviser to the Bank of England. For services to Colonial Governments.
- Richard Turner, Assistant Chief Architect, Ministry of Works.
- John Archibald Venn, President of Queen's College, University of Cambridge, lately Chairman of the Colonial Studies Committee.
- Kenneth Southwold Weston, OBE, Assistant Secretary, HM Treasury.
- Edgar Riley Wilkinson, Commercial Manager, Central Electricity Authority.
- Cornelius Ewen MacLean Greenfield, MBE, Secretary to the Treasury, Southern Rhodesia.
- Professor Stephen Henry Roberts, Vice-Chancellor of the University of Sydney, State of New South Wales.
- Thomas Vaisey Scrivenor, Deputy High Commissioner for Basutoland, the Bechuanaland Protectorate and Swaziland.
- Colonel Allan Spowers, DSO, MC. For public services in the State of Victoria.
- Geofroy William Tory, Deputy High Commissioner for the United Kingdom in the Commonwealth of Australia.
- James Godfrey Colquhoun Allen, Senior Resident, Eastern Region, Nigeria.
- Arthur John Grattan-Bellew, QC, Attorney General and Member for Legal Affairs, Tanganyika.
- William Leycester Rouse Carbonell. Commissioner of Police, Federation of Malaya.
- George Barrington Cartland, Minister of Social Services, Uganda.
- Frank Simon Collier, CBE, Forestry Adviser to the Secretary of State for the Colonies.
- Brigadier Edward John Gibbons, CBE, Commissioner of the Cameroons, Federation of Nigeria.
- Alan Forbes Bourne Glennie, Resident Commissioner, Barotseland Protectorate, Northern Rhodesia.
- John Henry Ingham, MBE, lately Secretary to the Royal Commission on East Africa.
- Francis Derek Jakeway, OBE, Chief Secretary, British Guiana.
- Thomas Boughton Bovell-Jones, Senior Resident, Western Region, Nigeria.
- James Leslie McLetchie, OBE, MB, ChB, Director of Medical Services, Eastern Region, Nigeria.
- John Stanley Mordecai, Executive Secretary, Regional Economic Committee for the West Indies.
- William Alexander Morris, Assistant Secretary, Colonial Office.
- Patrick Allan Pearson Robertson, Financial Secretary, Aden.
- Kenneth Willison Simmonds, Financial Secretary, Nyasaland.
- George Evelyn Sinclair, OBE, Deputy Governor, Cyprus.
- Sydney Macdonald-Smith, Chief Regional Officer, Gold Coast.
- Charles Edward Tilney, Financial Secretary and Member for Finance and Economics, Tanganyika.
- Cyril Herbert Williams, OBE, Provincial Commissioner, Nyanza Province, Kenya.
- Conrad Veale Williams, Senior Resident, Northern Region, Nigeria.
- Yeo Kok Cheang, MD, BS, Director of Medical and Health Services, Hong Kong.
- Captain Cuthbert Francis Bond Bowlby, CBE, DSC, Royal Navy (Retired), lately Foreign Office.
- Colin Tradescant Crowe, Foreign Office.
- Andrew Graham Gilchrist, Counsellor, Office of the Commissioner-General for Her Majesty's Government in the United Kingdom in South-East Asia.
- Cecil Ernest Freeman Gough, Counsellor, United Kingdom Delegation to the North Atlantic Treaty Organisation, Paris.
- Patrick Francis Hancock, Foreign Office.
- Geoffrey Hawkesworth, lately Governor of Kordofan Province, Sudan.
- Brigadier Reginald Vernon Hume, CBE, TD, (Retired), lately Her Majesty's Consul at Kiel.
- Cecil Edward King, Foreign Office.
- Roderick Wallis Parkes, OBE, Her Majesty's Ambassador Extraordinary and Plenipotentiary in Jedda.
- John Howard Peck, Counsellor, Political Office with the Middle East Forces, Nicosia.
- Charles Thomas Frank Serjeant, lately Deputy General Manager, Sudan Railways.
- James Mark Walsh, OBE, Counsellor (Commercial) at Her Majesty's Embassy in Berne.

=== Royal Victorian Order ===
==== Knight Commander of the Royal Victorian Order (KCVO) ====
- Alexander Greig Anderson, CVO, MD, ChB.
- Professor Albert Edward Richardson.
- Sir George Henry Wilkinson, Bt.

==== Commander of the Royal Victorian Order (CVO) ====
- Geoffrey Hugh Eastwood, CBE.
- William Macmillan.
- William Bertram Richards, MVO.
- Stafford Eric Saint, MRCS, LRCP.
- Louis Emmanuel Jean Guy de Savoie-Carignan de Soissons, OBE.
- Sir John Hanbury-Williams.

==== Member of the Royal Victorian Order (MVO) ====
At this time the two lowest classes of the Royal Victorian Order were "Member (fourth class)" and "Member (fifth class)", both with post-nominal letters MVO. "Member (fourth class)" was renamed "Lieutenant" (LVO) from the 1985 New Year Honours onwards.

Fourth Class

- Montague Charles Glover, MC.
- Wing Commander Beresford Peter Torrington Horsley, AFC, Royal Air Force.
- Commander John William Mott, Royal Navy.
- Ian Macbeth Robertson.

Fifth Class

- George Albert Harris.
- Shipwright Lieutenant Ronald Douglas Martin, Royal Navy.
- Frank Rowden.
- George Henry Hellendale Syms.
- Alice Ethel Veness.
- Richard Charles Cameron Ward.
- Laurence Conway West.

=== Order of the British Empire ===
==== Knight Grand Cross of the Order of the British Empire (GBE) ====
Military Division

- General Sir Miles Christopher Dempsey, KCB, KBE, DSO, MC, (9391), late Infantry (now R.A.R.O.), Colonel, The Royal Berkshire Regiment; Colonel Commandant, Special Air Service Regiment; Colonel Commandant, Corps of Royal Military Police.

Civil Division

- Herbrand Edward Dundonald Brassey, Earl De La Warr, Lord Privy Seal, 1937–1938; President, Board of Education, 1938–1940; First Commissioner of Works, April–May 1940; Postmaster General, 1951–1955.
- Sir John Morison, chairman, Iron and Steel Holding and Realisation Agency since 1953.
- Sir Christopher Frederick Ashton Warner, KCMG, lately Her Majesty's Ambassador Extraordinary and Plenipotentiary in Brussels.

==== Dame Commander of the Order of the British Empire (DBE) ====
Civil Division

- Diana Cicely, Countess of Albemarle, chairman, Development Commission.
- Margot Fonteyn, CBE, (Madame Roberto de Arias). For services to the ballet.
- Kathleen Lonsdale, Professor of Chemistry and Head of the Department of Crystallography, University College, University of London.
- Lucile Newell Sayers, CBE. For political and public services.

==== Knight Commander of the Order of the British Empire (KBE) ====
Military Division

- Vice-Admiral Charles Fred Wivell Norris, CB, DSO.
- Rear-Admiral Leopold Edward Rebbeck, CB, (Retired).
- Lieutenant-General Brian Charles Hannam Kimmins, CB, CBE, (1294), late Royal Regiment of Artillery, Colonel Commandant, Royal Regiment of Artillery.
- Lieutenant-General Horatius Murray, CB, DSO, (27245), late Infantry.
- Air Vice-Marshal Leslie John Vernon Bates, CB, CBE, Royal Air Force (Retired).

Civil Division

- Sir Hugh Eyre Campbell Beaver. For public services and services to industry.
- Sir Claude Dixon Gibb, CBE, chairman, C. A. Parsons and Company Ltd, Newcastle-on-Tyne.
- Alexander Glen, CB, MC, Secretary, Department of Agriculture for Scotland.
- Douglas Alexander Earsman Harkness, CBE, Permanent Secretary, Ministry of Finance, Northern Ireland.
- Charles Edward Key, CB, CBE, Deputy Under-Secretary of State, War Office.
- William Henry Tucker Luce, CMG, OBE, Adviser on External and Constitutional Affairs, Sudan Government.
- William John Sullivan, CMG, CBE, Her Majesty's Ambassador Extraordinary and Plenipotentiary in Mexico City.
- Malcolm McIntosh, Minister of Works and Minister of Marine, State of South Australia.
- Major Ferdinand William Cavendish-Bentinck, CMG, MC. For public services in Kenya.
- James Dundas Harford, CMG, Governor and Commander-in-Chief, St. Helena.
- David Charles Watherston, CMG, Chief Secretary, Federation of Malaya.

==== Commander of the Order of the British Empire (CBE) ====
Military Division

Royal Navy

- Captain Laurence Shaw Bennett.
- Captain Christopher Webster Jones, ADC.
- Commodore Frank Tavender Pollinger, VRD, Royal Naval Volunteer Reserve.
- Captain William Francis Henry Crawford Rutherford, DSO.
- Commander Cortlandt James Woore Simpson, DSC.

Army

- Colonel Desmond Charles Curme (39152), late Royal Regiment of Artillery.
- Brigadier (temporary) Michael Preston Douglas Dewar, MBE, (34749), late Infantry.
- Brigadier Dennis Robert Guinness, OBE, (27919), late Corps of Royal Engineers.
- Brigadier Dudley William Bruce Trower Hogg, MBE, (27205), late Infantry.
- Brigadier Ernest Arthur Howard (12488), late Royal Regiment of Artillery.
- Brigadier Cecil Hunt, ADC, (120), Royal Army Ordnance Corps.
- Colonel (acting) George Vicary Kenyon, TD, (65959), Army Cadet Force.
- Colonel (temporary) Thomas Charles Lowrie (221171), Corps of Royal Electrical and Mechanical Engineers.
- Colonel Douglas George Garrard Macdonald (18223), late Corps of Royal Engineers.
- Colonel Henry Walter Terrell Marden, MBE, (17084), Royal Army Pay Corps.
- The Reverend Richard John Forrester Mayston, MBE, QHC, MA, Chaplain to the Forces, First Class (69554), Royal Army Chaplains' Department.
- Colonel John Edward Longworth Morris, DSO, OBE, (41195), late Royal Regiment of Artillery.
- Brigadier Duncan Walter Neilson, (33356), late Royal Regiment of Artillery.
- Brigadier Luther Gladstone Smith, OBE, ADC, (31321), Corps of Royal Electrical and Mechanical Engineers.
- Brigadier John FitzGerald Snow (32138), late Infantry.
- Brigadier Stair Agnew Stewart, OBE, (30555), late Corps of Royal Engineers.

Royal Air Force

- Acting Air Vice-Marshal Alfred Cotterill Kermode, OBE, ADC.
- Acting Air Commodore Alick Foord-Kelcey, AFC.
- Acting Air Commodore Glen Albyn Martin Knight, MB, BS.
- Group Officer Mary Henrietta Barnett, OBE, Women's Royal Air Force.
- Group Captain Arthur James Biggar.
- Group Captain Maurice Quartano Candler, (Retired).
- Group Captain Patrick Abercrombie Lombard, DFC.
- Group Captain David Ivor Phorson MacNair.
- Group Captain Christopher John Mount, DSO, DFC.
- Group Captain Patrick Henry Ridley Saunders.
- Group Captain Albert Wallington Taylor, (Retired).

Civil Division

- Brigadier Gilmour Menzies Anderson, MBE. For political and public services.
- Ralph James Bushnan Anderson, Assistant Solicitor, Office of HM Procurator General and Treasury Solicitor.
- Group Captain Douglas Robert Stewart Bader, DSO, DFC. For services to the disabled.
- Charles Vernon Oldfield Bartlett, Publicist and Broadcaster.
- Cecil Edwin Henry Bawn, Grant-Brunner Professor of Inorganic and Physical Chemistry, University of Liverpool.
- Major Eric Frederick Beckett. For political and public services in Dorset.
- Leonard Frederick Behrens, JP. For public and cultural services in Manchester.
- Alderman Herbert Neville Bewley, JP, Chairman of the Housing Committee, Liverpool City Council.
- Rudolf Franz Josef Bing. For services to music.
- Geoffrey Vaughan Blackstone, OBE, GM, Chief Officer, Hertfordshire Fire Brigade.
- Captain Charles Frederick Booth, OBE, Assistant Engineer-in-Chief, General Post Office.
- Eleanor Bradley, OBE, chairman, Leeds Savings Committee.
- Conrad Chawner Burdge, Regional Director, Leeds, Ministry of Works.
- John Blomfield Burnell, JP, Operating Manager (Central Road Services), London Transport Executive.
- Lieutenant-Colonel Walter Raymond Burrell, MBE, TD, DL, Member of Council, Country Landowners' Association.
- Henry Montagu Burrows, Principal Clerk of Public Bills, House of Lords.
- Charles Montague Cahn, Assistant Judge Advocate General.
- William Henry Cashmore, Director, National Institute of Agricultural Engineering, Silsoe, Bedfordshire.
- Samuel Harrison Clarke, Director, Fire Research Station, Department of Scientific and Industrial Research.
- William Arthur Claydon, Headmaster, Maidstone Grammar School, Kent.
- Thomas Kingsley Collett, Chief Commoner, City of London.
- James Crawford, General President, National Union of Boot and Shoe Operatives.
- Harold Vernon Disney, Chief Engineer, Industrial Group Headquarters, Risley, United Kingdom Atomic Energy Authority.
- Arthur Thomas Doodson, Director, Liverpool Observatory and Tidal Institute.
- Cyril Alfred Flux Dundas, OBE. Representative of the British Council in India.
- Hugh Crombie Falconer, OBE, chairman, Border Agricultural Executive Committee.
- William Geoffrey Fiske, chairman, London County Council Housing Committee.
- James Elliott Forde, Chairman of the Northern Bank Ltd., Belfast. For public services in Northern Ireland.
- Archibald Gerald Glenister, chairman, Malayan Chamber of Mines.
- Robert Graham, Director of Aircraft Research and Development, Ministry of Supply.
- The Reverend William Macmaster Graham, JP. For public services in Invernessshire.
- George William Grosvenor, managing director, J. Long & Sons (Bath) Ltd.
- James William Hall, OBE, Controller of Audit and Accounts, War Office.
- Colonel George Cecil Hans Hamilton, chairman, Isle of Wight Disablement Advisory Committee.
- Leslie Douglas Harkess, Director, Contracts Department, General Post Office.
- Leslie Poles Hartley, Author and Critic.
- George Hawley, Assistant Secretary, Department of Health for Scotland.
- Herbert Victor Hayes, Director, Air Technical Publications, Ministry of Supply.
- Colonel Joseph Henry Haygarth. For political and public services in Middlesex.
- Wilfrid Edward Hiley, OBE, Director, Woodlands Research Department, Dartington Woodlands Ltd.
- Christopher Pascoe Hill, Assistant Secretary, Home Office.
- Harold Ferguson Hodgson, managing director, Joseph Sankey & Sons Ltd., Bilston, Staffordshire.
- James Douglas Hood, JP, chairman and managing director, Wilson & Glenny Ltd.
- Charles Edward Hudson, Senior Education and Advisory Officer, National Agricultural Advisory Service, Ministry of Agriculture, Fisheries and Food.
- Edward Hughes, Senior Chief Clerk, Metropolitan Magistrates' Courts Service.
- Fred William Hunt, lately chairman, Derbyshire Agricultural Executive Committee.
- Captain William Millar Hutchison, Chief Marine Superintendent, British Tanker Company Ltd.
- Percy Edward Reginald Jeffries, Chief Surveyor, Admiralty.
- Robert Thomas Jenkins. For services to the study of Welsh history.
- Richard Henry Johns, OBE, President, Board of Administration, Guernsey.
- David John Jones, OBE, Town Clerk, Borough of Rhondda.
- Harold Fenton Jones, Regional Controller, North Western Region, Ministry of Labour and National Service.
- William Myddelton Jones, lately Official Solicitor to the Church Commissioners.
- Leonard Entwisle Kenyon, Secretary, British Federation of Master Printers.
- John Francis Archibald, Baron Kilmaine, Secretary of the Pilgrim Trust.
- John Henry Larrard, Regional Controller, South Western Region, Board of Trade and Ministry of Supply.
- Hulton Dudley Lewis, Assistant Secretary, Ministry of Agriculture, Fisheries and Food.
- William Lindsay. For political and public services in Sussex.
- Arthur George Linfield, OBE, JP, chairman, South-West Metropolitan Regional Hospital Board.
- Hugh Montagu Cameron Macaulay, MD, Senior Administrative Medical Officer, North West Metropolitan Regional Hospital Board.
- Hugh Stewart MacKintosh, Director of Education, Glasgow.
- Christopher Macrae, Secretary, The Scottish Council (Development and Industry).
- Charles Titterton Maitland, MD, FRCP, Principal Medical Officer, Ministry of Health.
- Agatha Mary Clarissa Mallowan (Agatha Christie), Writer.
- Arthur Hedley Marshall, City Treasurer, Coventry.
- Professor James Robert Matthews, lately chairman, Scottish Committee, The Nature Conservancy. Chairman of the council, Macaulay Institute for Soil Research.
- Ellen Catherine Mee, HM Inspector of Schools (Chief Inspector), Ministry of Education.
- Rennie John Moffat, MBE, DirectorGeneral of Marketing, National Coal Board.
- Gilbert Walter Morgan, OBE, Assistant Secretary, Foreign Office.
- Bertram Nelson, Member, Companies Act Consultative Committee of the Board of Trade. President of the Society of Incorporated Accountants.
- Basil Edward Nield, MBE, QC, MP, Member of Parliament for Chester since 1940. For political and public services.
- Roland Nightingale, MB, ChB, President of the Association of Certifying Factory Surgeons. Factory Doctor for Stockport District.
- Alfred William Hammond Noakes, Registrar of Death Duties (Scotland), Board of Inland Revenue.
- Thomas Paris, Assistant Secretary, Air Services "A" Division, Ministry of Transport and Civil Aviation.
- Alan Sterling Parkes, Director, Division of Experimental Biology, National Institute for Medical Research.
- Oscar John Phillips, OBE, Assistant Comptroller, National Debt Office.
- Lawrence William Plewes, MD, FRCS, Consulting Orthopaedic Surgeon, Luton and Dunstable Hospital.
- Captain Athelstan Popkess, OBE, Chief Constable, Nottingham City Police Force.
- Walter Randell, MBE, Deputy Chief Valuer, Board of Inland Revenue.
- Andrew Reid, Assistant Secretary, Ministry of Supply.
- Harry Richardson, Principal, Bradford Technical College.
- Ian McGillivray Roberton, Assistant Secretary, Ministry of Pensions and National Insurance.
- Thomas Arthur Rogers, Deputy Chief Inspector of Mines and Quarries, Ministry of Fuel and Power.
- Horace Claude Salmon, lately Assistant Secretary, Admiralty.
- Robert McMaster Sayers. For public services in Belfast.
- David Paul Scofield, Actor.
- Denis Herbert Scott, deputy chairman, Public Works Loan Board.
- Thomas Dowker Shepherd. For political and public services in Cumberland.
- Sir (Francis) Osbert Sacheverell Sitwell, Bt., JP, Author and Poet.
- Gordon Charles Henry Slater, Assistant Secretary, Ministry of Labour and National Service.
- Kenneth Manley Smith, Director, Virus Research Unit (Agricultural Research Council), Molteno Institute, University of Cambridge.
- Reginald Spencer Stafford, Technical Director, Handley Page Ltd.
- Leslie Steains, OBE, JP, Member, National Savings Committee, representing the North Western Region.
- Gerald Steel, JP, General Managing Director, The United Steel Companies Ltd., Sheffield.
- Edwin Percy Stewart, Chief Surveyor, Air Ministry.
- George Valentine Strudwick, Director of Contracts, Ministry of Works.
- Audrey Frances Philipson, Lady Worsley-Taylor, JP. For political and public services in Lancashire.
- James Gilbert Taylor, Divisional Road Engineer, North Eastern Division, Ministry of Transport and Civil Aviation.
- Benjamin Crewdson Thomas, OBE, Administration Controller, Central Office of Information.
- Thomas Vose, OBE, Assistant Secretary, Welsh Office, Ministry of Housing and Local Government.
- George Frederick Dennis Wade. For political services in Warwickshire.
- Ellis Kirkham Waterhouse, MBE, Barber Professor of Fine Arts and Director of the Barber Institute, University of Birmingham.
- Edward Shepley Watson, HM Inspector of Schools (Divisional Inspector), Ministry of Education.
- Alexander Henry Melvill Wedderburn, JP, chairman, General Executive Committee of the Queen's Institute of District Nursing.
- Cicely Veronica Wedgwood, Author and Historian.
- Lady Anastasia (Zia) Mikhailovna Wernher, OBE. For political and public services in Bedfordshire.
- Katharine Georgina Lloyd-Williams, MD, Dean of the School of Medicine, Royal Free Hospital.
- Ernest Leslie Wright, Director of Accountants, Board of Trade.
- Eleanor Yorke. For political and public services in the West Riding of Yorkshire.
- John Waynflete Carter, lately Counsellor at Her Majesty's Embassy in Washington.
- Alfred Cecil Cooper, lately Bishop of the Church of England in Korea.
- John Hudson-Davies, lately Director of the Posts and Telegraphs Department, Sudan Government.
- Donald Robert Duncan, OBE, lately Director of Internal Affairs Division, Allied Commission for Austria (British Element).
- Alexander Kidd Duthie, OBE, British subject resident in Denmark.
- Arthur Ralph Brooks Edgecombe, lately Secretary-General of the Jordan Development Board.
- Abington Goodden, Her Majesty's Consul-General at Seville.
- Robert Murray Meikle, MBE, British subject resident in Greece.
- John Kingston O'Donoghue, OBE, Her Majesty's Consul-General at Philadelphia.
- Douglas Chisholm Fairbairn, CIE, Secretary of the Bengal Chamber of Commerce and Industry, and the Associated Chambers of Commerce of India, since 1938.
- Colonel Norman Sydney Ferris, OBE, ED. For public services in Southern Rhodesia.
- James Norman Kirby, a Company Director in the State of New South Wales. For public services.
- Hamilton Macaulay, President of the Chittagong Chamber of Commerce, and Chairman of the Chittagong Sub-Branch of the United Kingdom Association, Pakistan.
- Charles George McDonald, ChM, FRACP, a prominent physician of Sydney, State of New South Wales.
- Charles McLean, formerly Senior Metropolitan Police Magistrate, Melbourne, now a Member of the Indeterminate Sentences Board, State of Victoria.
- Thomas Norman Mitchell, President of the Royal Agricultural Society, State of Victoria.
- Leonard Ray Morgan, Secretary for Education, Federation of Rhodesia and Nyasaland.
- Councillor Oliver John Nilsen, a Member of the Melbourne City Council, State of Victoria, for many years.
- Horace Clitheroe Smith, ISO, Secretary for Agriculture, State of Tasmania.
- Robert Moore Steele. For services to Accountancy in the State of South Australia.
- Stephen Hezekiah Oluwole Oluremilekun Awokoya, Minister of Education, Western Region, Nigeria.
- Frederick Malcolm Boland, lately Puisne Judge, British Guiana.
- Angus Robert Clark, OBE, Financial Secretary, Gambia.
- Harry Bernard Cox, Principal Secretary, Office of the Commissioner for Nigeria in the United Kingdom.
- John Ralph Cusack, Oversea Audit Service, Controller and Auditor General, Kenya, and Auditor General, East Africa High Commission Services.
- Joseph Edward Debono, MD, FRCP. For medical services in Malta.
- John Drysdale. For public services in Selangor, Federation of Malaya.
- Clive Elliot, JP. For public services in Fiji.
- Richard Reginald Anderson Farrington. For public services in the Bahamas.
- Harold Rupert Hirst, Accountant-General of the Federation of Nigeria.
- James Lawrence Cecil Horstead, Archbishop of West Africa.
- Frank Leach, OBE, MC, Adviser on Recruitment, Gold Coast Commissioner's Office.
- John Charles Lithgow. For services to the Uganda Electricity Board.
- Douglas Sinclair Miller, OBE, Director of Education, Uganda.
- Abang Haji Mustapha bin Abang Haji Moasili, OBE, Datu Bandar of Sarawak and Adviser on Malay Affairs.
- William Thomas Newing, Assistant Postmaster General (Finance) and Chief Accountant, East African Posts and Telecommunications Administration.
- William George Rodway. For anti-locust work in East Africa.
- Theodore Eustace Sealy, JP, Editor of the Daily Gleaner, Jamaica.
- Derek Holmes Shackles, Registrar, Supreme Court, Kuala Lumpur, Federation of Malaya.
- Henry Campbell Wilkinson, MD, lately Director, of Health Services, Bermuda.
- Robert Orchard Williams, OBE. For services to the Clove Growers' Association in Zanzibar.
- Samuel Godfrey Wilson, Director of Veterinary Services, Northern Region, Nigeria.

Honorary Commander

- Toh Eng Hoe. For public services in Perak, Federation of Malaya.

==== Officer of the Order of the British Empire (OBE) ====
Military Division

Royal Navy

- Major Ernest Augustus Allenby, Royal Marines.
- The Reverend Bernard Robinson Beasley, Chaplain.
- Surgeon Commander Herbert Lewis Belcher, MRCS, LRCP.
- Commander Robert Lancelot Cole.
- Commander Norman Austen Dolton.
- Commander Hubert Thomas Lewis.
- Acting Commander James Hamilton Dundas, DSC.
- Lieutenant-Commander Ivor Reginald Mason.
- Commander Leonard Herbert Neal, RD, Royal Naval Reserve.
- Commander Kenneth Charles Ogilvie.
- Commander John Cox Pearson.

Army

- Major (G.C.O.) Bagdhan Rai, MBE, MC, (388436), 10th Princess Mary's Own Gurkha Rifles.
- Major Arthur Broadley, MBE, TD, (16676), The Buffs (Royal East Kent Regiment (Employed List (4)) (now retired).
- Lieutenant-Colonel (temporary) David Hugh Wylie Brown, MBE, (63026), Royal Regiment of Artillery.
- Lieutenant-Colonel (acting) John Fleming Burns (172364), Combined Cadet Force.
- Lieutenant-Colonel and Brevet Colonel Henry Calvert Clapham, TD, (47319), Royal Regiment of Artillery, Territorial Army (now T.A.R.O.).
- Lieutenant-Colonel (temporary) Leonard Augustus Coates (167716), Royal Army Ordnance Corps.
- Lieutenant-Colonel (acting) Thomas Kingsley Collett, 51st Kent Battalion, Home Guard.
- Lieutenant-Colonel Hugh Christopher Built Cook (44621), The South Staffordshire Regiment.
- Lieutenant-Colonel (acting) Hugh Cecil Covell, TD, 22nd Hampshire Battalion, Home Guard.
- Lieutenant-Colonel Leslie Cromwell (38028), Royal Army Service Corps.
- Lieutenant-Colonel Antony Piers de Tabley Daniell, MC, TD, (79819), Corps of Royal Engineers, Territorial Army (now T.A.R.O.).
- Lieutenant-Colonel Kenneth Francis Daniell (47534), Corps of Royal Engineers.
- Lieutenant-Colonel Austin Bernard Dempsey (66501), Royal Army Medical Corps.
- Lieutenant-Colonel James McEwen Duncan (177447), Royal Army Ordnance Corps, Territorial Army (now T.A.R.O.).
- Colonel (temporary) David Boswell Egerton, MC, (63503), Royal Regiment of Artillery.
- Lieutenant-Colonel (temporary) Francis Harry Frankcom (68894), Royal Army Educational Corps.
- Lieutenant-Colonel (acting) John Ford Franklin, 1st Montgomeryshire Battalion, Home Guard.
- Lieutenant-Colonel Jane Geddes Grierson (223914), Women's Royal Army Corps.
- Lieutenant-Colonel (Staff Quartermaster) Horace Arthur Geoffrey Havilland, MBE, (113069), Employed List 2.
- Lieutenant-Colonel Harry Hodkinson (189135), Royal Army Service Corps.
- Lieutenant-Colonel Henry Francis Jackson, MBE, TD, (70851), Honourable Artillery Company (Infantry), Territorial Army.
- Lieutenant-Colonel (acting) Richard Bateman Jessop, 10th Lindsey (Skegness) Battalion, Home Guard.
- Lieutenant-Colonel William Dewar Johnston, TD, (101334), Royal Regiment of Artillery, Territorial Army.
- Colonel (temporary) Thomas Leslie Laister, TD, (90469), The Royal Ulster Rifles.
- Lieutenant-Colonel Kenneth Mark Walters Leather, MC, (44935), The Durham Light Infantry.
- Lieutenant-Colonel (acting) Thomas Harper Lewis (298093), Army Cadet Force.
- Lieutenant-Colonel George Kennett Chaworth Lyster-Todd (62651), The Durham Light Infantry (Employed List (1)).
- Lieutenant-Colonel Douglas Dundas Maitland, LRCP, LRCS, (73589), Royal Army Medical Corps.
- Lieutenant-Colonel Maurice George Massey, TD, (66715), Royal Army Service Corps, Territorial Army (now T.A.R.O.).
- Lieutenant-Colonel (temporary) Gilbert Walter Riversdale Monckton, MC, (72764), 5th Royal Inniskilling Dragoon Guards, Royal Armoured Corps.
- Lieutenant-Colonel (temporary) Norman Morrison (70867), Royal Army Educational Corps.
- Lieutenant-Colonel Derek Victor Penman, TD, (88360), The Gordon Highlanders, Territorial Army (now T.A.R.O.).
- Lieutenant-Colonel Paul Eaton Pettit, MC, TD, (66259), Royal Regiment of Artillery, Territorial Army (now T.A.R.O.).
- Lieutenant-Colonel (Staff Paymaster, 2nd Class) (temporary) Joseph Henry Pittham (183514), Royal Army Pay Corps.
- Lieutenant-Colonel Llewellyn Frank Rees, TD, (36987), Royal Regiment of Artillery, Territorial Army.
- Lieutenant-Colonel (temporary) Frederick William Watson, MBE, (152028), Corps of Royal Engineers.
- Lieutenant-Colonel (acting) Philip Noel Garnay Whitlam, TD, (47168), Combined Cadet Force.
- Lieutenant-Colonel (temporary) Gerard Williams, MBE, (191108), Corps of Royal Engineers.
- Lieutenant-Colonel John Edmund Williams (161395), Royal Army Service Corps.
- Lieutenant-Colonel (acting) Frederick Richard Wright (290145), Combined Cadet Force.
- Lieutenant-Colonel (acting) William George Riley, MBE, (C.C.155), Special List (ex-Indian Army); at present on loan to the Government of India.
- Lieutenant-Colonel Ernest James Haywood, MBE, TD, Commanding Officer, British Guiana Volunteer Force.
- Lieutenant-Colonel Thomas John Hutchinson, Commandant, Singapore Military Forces.
- Lieutenant-Colonel Orville Frank Cardwell Walcott, ED, Officer Commanding, Barbados Regiment.

Royal Air Force

- Acting Group Captain Thomas William Kean, AFC, (43174).
- Wing Commander John Owen Barnard (33358).
- Wing Commander George William Emeny, BEM, (43224).
- Wing Commander Robert Clears Fordham, MBE, (47439).
- Wing Commander Frank Lewis Jenkins, MBE, (44354).
- Wing Commander Percy Hargrave Legg (73269).
- Wing Commander Christopher Neil Foxley-Norris, DSO, (70225).
- Wing Commander Frederick James Robinson, DFC, (61028).
- Wing Commander John Seldon (104889).
- Wing Commander Shirley Taylor Underwood (113846).
- Wing Commander Gordon William Whittaker, DSO, (73475). (Commission since relinquished.)
- Acting Wing Commander Ivan Chester Hover (502756).
- Acting Wing Commander Norman Macmillan, MC, AFC, (136291), Royal Air Force Volunteer Reserve.
- Squadron Leader William Tait Dunlop (46146).
- Squadron Leader Charles Holdway, AFC, (43827).
- Squadron Leader Terence McGreevy (48569).
- Squadron Officer Philippa Frances Marshall (4937), Women's Royal Air Force.
- Squadron Leader Philip Richard Robinson (47115).
- Squadron Leader Bernard Reginald Roy Snape (113608).
- Flight Lieutenant Edward John Allan Stephenson (48960).

Civil Division

- Edward Murray Mayne Alexander, Temporary Curator (Prehistory), Department of British and Medieval Antiquities, British Museum.
- Harold Humphrey Allen, MBE, assistant director, Accounts Division, Ministry of Transport and Civil Aviation.
- Raymond George Allen, Director, Printing & Binding Division, HM Stationery Office.
- Margaret Betty Harvie Anderson. For political and public services.
- James Anderton, Area General Manager, No. 3 (St. Helens) Area, North Western Division, National Coal Board.
- Hilda Andrews. For political and public services in Epsom.
- Lawrence Robert Armstrong, deputy chairman, British Cellophane Ltd.
- Marjorie Bain. For political and public services in Hertfordshire.
- Frederick John Ballard, Senior Treasurer, Dental Board of the United Kingdom.
- John Foster Beaver, JP, Member, Bradford Employment Committee.
- Alderman Albert Biles, JP. For public services in Weymouth.
- Phyllis Constance Biscoe, Secretary, Common Interests Council, English Speaking Union of the Commonwealth.
- Alexander Henderson Blair, Superintending Valuer, Ministry of Finance, Northern Ireland.
- Francis de Lisle Bois, Greffier of the States of Jersey, and Chief Parliamentary Draughtsman.
- Captain Robert Henry Dundas Bolton, Chief Constable, Northamptonshire Constabulary.
- Hugh Blair Brenan, Principal, War Office.
- Gilbert Brown, Woods Manager and Factor, Strathspey Properties of the Seafield Estates.
- Arthur Edward Buddell, MC, Regional Manager, London South Western Region, Central Land Board and War Damage Commission.
- Joseph Langley Burchnall, MC, Professor of Mathematics, University of Durham.
- Harry Burn. For public services in March, Cambridgeshire.
- John Thomas Byrne, MBE, JP, Area Secretary, West of Scotland, Electrical Trades Union.
- Arthur Charles Ross Cameron, Grade 2 Officer, London & South Eastern Regional Office, Ministry of Labour and National Service.
- Walter Staines Catlow, Senior Civil Engineer, War Office.
- Leslie Raper Chambers, Secretary, National Council of Building Material Producers.
- Lily Frances Chitty, Chief Correspondent for Shropshire Ancient Monuments Department, Ministry of Works.
- Elizabeth Ellen Christmas, lately Warden of Denman College.
- Ella Comfort Clarke, JP, Headmistress, Barry County Secondary School, Northampton.
- Zebedee Thomas Claro, Chief Industrial Relations Officer, Ministry of Labour and National Service.
- Leslie Cocollis, MBE, managing director, British Overseas Boat Co. Ltd.
- Catherine Alice Cooper. For political and public services in Essex.
- Frederick Stanley Coote, Divisional Manager, Far East, Cable & Wireless Ltd., Hong Kong.
- Thomas Henry Corkill, Chief Engineer, SS Forester, Thos. & Jas. Harrison Ltd.
- Frederick John Cowlin, Chief Engineer, Steam Turbine Division, English Electric Company Ltd., Rugby.
- Virginia Beatrice Cunard, MBE, lately Chief Officer, Nursing Cadets, St. John Ambulance Brigade.
- Charles James Dale, Assistant Accountant-General, Board of Customs and Excise.
- Thomas Davies, MRCS, LRCP, chairman, Medical Recruiting Board, Cardiff, Ministry of Labour and National Service.
- Robert Brian Dawson, Director, Sports Turf Research Institute.
- Harry George James Dexter, Head Postmaster, Newcastle-on-Tyne.
- John Douglas Hamilton Dickson. For services to music in Scotland.
- David Harold Dinsdale, Provincial Agricultural Economist and assistant director in Agricultural Economics, King's College, University of Durham.
- Alderman William Russell Dixon, chairman, Housing Committee, Ripon City Council.
- Robert McCallum Douglas, chairman and managing director, Robert M. Douglas (Contractors) Ltd.
- Henry James Dowden, MC, Senior Principal Scientific Officer, Department of Scientific and Industrial Research.
- Douglas Gordon Duff, Lubricating Oil Adviser, Ministry of Fuel and Power.
- Margery Shipley Ellis, JP. For political and public services in Peterborough.
- Arthur Vernon Elwes, Leader of Employers, Licensed Residential Establishment and Licensed Restaurant Wages Board.
- Lieutenant-Colonel Gwilym Tudor Evans, Technical Adviser, War Office. (Seconded from General Post Office.)
- Randle Bradlaugh Evans, Principal Clerk, Board of Inland Revenue.
- Thomas Bruce Feltham, Town Clerk, Hereford.
- Albert Fillmore, Senior Chief Executive Officer, Ministry of Agriculture, Fisheries and Food.
- Frederick Charles Forty, Assistant Accountant-General, Commonwealth Relations Office.
- Harold Stanley Foster, MBE, JP, President, Ashton-in-Makerfield Savings Committee, Lancashire.
- Kenneth Fraser, MD, County Medical Officer, Cumberland.
- Edgar Willie Garland, Provision Buyer, Navy, Army and Air Force Institutes.
- Alderman Nicholas Garrow. For services to the blind and for public services in Northumberland.
- Vivian Isaac Gaster, Principal Regional Officer, Eastern Region. Ministry of Housing and Local Government.
- Robert Getgood, Member, Northern Ireland General Health Services Board.
- Joseph Evans Gordon, Director of Studies in Agriculture, University of Edinburgh and Deputy Principal, Edinburgh and East of Scotland College of Agriculture.
- Clifford Frederic Gothard. For political and public services in Burton-on-Trent.
- Charles Frederick Henry Grainger, deputy chairman, London Wholesale Provisions and Groceries Committee.
- James Shaw Grant, JP, Editor, Stornoway Gazette, Isle of Lewis.
- Fred Greenwell, Secretary, British Coking Industry Association.
- Major Robert John Brymer-Griffith, JP, chairman, Montgomeryshire and Radnorshire Employment Committee.
- James William Peer Groves. For political and public services in Salford.
- Margery Allen, Baroness Hacking. For political services.
- Thomas Forde Hall, Principal Officer, Ministry of Labour and National Insurance, Northern Ireland.
- Frank Edwin Halliwell, Senior Chief Executive Officer, Air Ministry.
- Arthur George Hamilton, Senior Depute City Chamberlain, Edinburgh.
- Captain Stuart Hirst Hampson, MBE, MC, chairman, Salford Executive Council, National Health Service.
- Alan John Arthur Hanhart, Solicitor and Assistant General Manager, Royal Automobile Club.
- Donald Benjamin Harden, Keeper of the Department of Antiquities, and Secretary, Griffith Institute, the Ashmolean Museum, University of Oxford.
- Frank Albert Harmon, lately Head of Branch, Ministry of Pensions and National Insurance.
- Lieutenant-Colonel William Thomas Harris, MC. For political and public services in Monmouthshire.
- Gilbert Harrop, Senior Inspector of Taxes, Board of Inland Revenue.
- Alfred Hartland, United Kingdom Trade Commissioner, Grade II, Sydney.
- Reginald James Harvey, lately Principal, Colonial Office.
- Robert John Hastings, MBE, chairman, South Ayrshire Local Savings Committee.
- Maurice Frederick Haynes, Principal, Ministry of Agriculture, Fisheries and Food.
- Lieutenant-Colonel Derrick Heald, Royal Engineers, assistant director, Ordnance Survey Department, Southampton.
- Frederick Heap, chairman, Association of Steel Drum Manufacturers.
- Brian Heathcote, lately Staff Manager, Alfred Holt & Co. Chairman, Liverpool Port Welfare Committee.
- Sidney Charles Hills, MBE, Regional Secretary, Transport and General Workers' Union, Northern Region.
- Patrick Cyril Henry Hillyard, Head of Variety Department, British Broadcasting Corporation.
- Arthur Atherfold Howgrave, Principal Inspection Officer, Packaging, Inspectorate of Electrical and Mechanical Equipment, Ministry of Supply.
- Percy William Hubbard, Principal, Air Ministry.
- William James Huggett, Manager, Marine Department (Carrier Equipment), General Electric Co. Ltd., Fraser & Chalmers Engineering Works, Erith, Kent.
- Thomas Hunter, chairman, Renfrew County Executive Council, National Health Service.
- John Richings James, Senior Research Officer, Ministry of Housing and Local Government.
- Margaret Young-Jamieson, Director of Women, Home Department, British Red Cross Society.
- Ronald Frederick Johnston, Principal Scientific Officer, Atomic Weapons Research Establishment, Foulness, United Kingdom Atomic Energy Authority.
- William Edward Johnston. For public services in County Fermanagh.
- James Johnstone, JP, Regional Industrial Relations Officer, Ministry of Labour and National Service.
- Captain Edward Warder Jordan, Flight Manager, Jersey Flight, British European Airways.
- Lieutenant-Colonel Cyril Joynson, JP, Chief Fishery and Pollution Officer, South West Wales River Board.
- Winifred Alice Judd, MBE, County Organiser, Hampshire Women's Voluntary Services.
- Thomas Hugh Kernohan, Secretary, Engineering and Allied Employers' (Northern Ireland) Association.
- Robert Kerr, TD, lately Keeper, Department of Art, Archaeology & Ethnology, Royal Scottish Museum, Edinburgh.
- Daniel Kissack, Honorary Secretary, Isle of Man, Forces Help Society and Lord Roberts Workshops.
- Clare Kreyer, Honorary Secretary, Oxfordshire Rural Community Council.
- John Edmund Lambert, Principal, Air Ministry.
- Colonel Hugh Francis d'Assisi Stuart Law, DSO, MC, TD, Secretary, Army Cadet Force Association, Scotland.
- Arnold Gregory Lea, chairman, Gloucester and District Savings Committee.
- Major Robert Webber Leach, chairman, Manchester and Salford National Insurance Appeal Tribunal.
- Alderman Edward Lewis, JP. For services to printing in Wales.
- Herbert Cecil Lewis, MBE, Commissioner for National Savings, Southern Region, National Savings Committee.
- Alfred James Leyland, Chief Officer, Middlesbrough Fire Brigade.
- Ian Gordon Lindsay. For services to Architecture in Scotland.
- Major Lancelot Walter Lloyd, TD. For political and public services in Norfolk.
- Janet Coghill Swanson Luke, MBE, JP. For political and public services in Glasgow and Lanarkshire.
- George MacAulay, Controller of Transport, Ministry of Works.
- Catherine, Baroness McEntee, JP, Mayor of the Borough of Walthamstow.
- James Kenneth McKendrick, General Manager and Secretary, Tyne Improvement Commission.
- Duncan St. Clair Macphail, lately Chief Architect and Surveyor, Department of Agriculture for Scotland.
- James Stuart McQuillin, Member, Central Milk Distributive Committee.
- Douglas John Manning, MBE, Principal, Board of Trade.
- Godfrey John Mapplebeck, Deputy Assistant Director, Joint Intelligence Bureau, Ministry of Defence.
- John Francis Marshall, Deputy Secretary and Establishment Officer, Office of the Receiver for the Metropolitan Police District.
- Herbert Edward Matthews, Principal Inspector, Board of Inland Revenue.
- Alderman John Harry Molyneux, JP. For public services in Dudley.
- Constance Caviller Morel, JP, Member, Visiting Committee for HM Prison Cardiff.
- Frederic Morena, Founder Secretary, Infantile Paralysis Fellowship.
- Reginald George Morgan, Deputy Chief Inspector, Board of Customs and Excise.
- Cecil Charles Morley, AFC, Chief Engineer, Maintenance Command, Royal Air Force.
- John Dudley Morton, Senior Principal Scientific Officer, Ministry of Supply.
- Norman Murchison, Headmaster, Ainslie Park Secondary School, Edinburgh.
- Frederick John Mustill, General Manager, Tanganyika Wattle Estates.
- George Francis New, General Manager, Fertiliser Manufacturers' Association Ltd.
- Douglas Charles Victor Nicholas, Principal, Board of Customs and Excise.
- William Leathley Nicholson, MB, ChB, Senior Medical Officer, Ministry of Pensions and National Insurance.
- Charles William Oatley, Reader in Engineering, University of Cambridge.
- John Patrick O'Connell, chairman, South East Metropolitan War Pensions Committee.
- Donal Maurice O'Herlihy, Borough Surveyor, Tynemouth County Borough Council.
- Fred Carter Ormrod, Official Receiver in Bankruptcy, Manchester and Stoke-on-Trent, Board of Trade.
- William Cecil Orr, Principal, Ministry of Works.
- Reginald Percy Charles Pamplin, chief executive officer, Admiralty.
- Herbert Parish, Chief Engineer, Henry Wiggin & Co. Ltd., Birmingham.
- Alfred Tennyson Parsons, lately Senior Principal Scientific Officer, Government Chemist's Department.
- James Craig Pattison, MBE, Chief Constable, City Police, Dundee.
- Francis James Peckham, District Probate Registrar, Norwich, Ipswich and Peterborough.
- Charles Samuel Perkins, MBE, Member, National Savings Assembly, representing Northumberland South and West.
- Francis Herbert Perkins, Education Officer, Imperial Chemical Industries Ltd.
- Harry Joseph Perrins, Senior District Inspector of Mines and Quarries, Durham Division, Ministry of Fuel and Power.
- Leslie Roy Phillips, Deputy Controller, European Division, British Council.
- John Murray Prain, DSO, TD, Employer Chairman, Dundee District Advisory Committee, Scottish Board for Industry.
- Sydney Frank Prentis, lately chief executive officer, Royal Aircraft Establishment, Farnborough, Ministry of Supply.
- John David Spencer Rawlinson, Senior Principal Scientific Officer, Admiralty.
- Alderman Robert Francis St. John Reade, chairman, Bristol-Hanover Council.
- John Wilson Reid, Deputy Provincial Director, South-West Province, National Agricultural Advisory Service, Ministry of Agriculture, Fisheries and Food.
- Paul Lennox Rex, MBE, Chief Passport Officer, Passport Office.
- Major William Ronnie, Chief Constable, Civil Aviation Constabulary, Ministry of Transport and Civil Aviation.
- Alfred George Royffe, Assistant Secretary, Foreign Office.
- Guy Frederick Saffery, lately Principal, Inland Telecommunications Department, General Post Office.
- Ian Norman Samuel, MRCS, LRCP. For political and public services in Battersea.
- Leslie Jack Seward, Immediate Past President, National Federation of Meat Traders Associations (Incorporated).
- William Ronald Seward, Principal, Chadacre Agricultural Institute, Suffolk.
- Esther Simpson, Assistant Secretary, Society for Visiting Scientists.
- Raymond Boyd Simpson, lately Independent Chairman, National Joint Industrial Council for the Hosiery Industry.
- Albert Edward Sims, Telephone Manager, Taunton, Somerset, General Post Office.
- Reginald Stone Snelling, deputy chairman, Wales Gas Board.
- William Victor Stevens, JP, Director and Secretary, Edinburgh Chamber of Commerce.
- Robert Sutcliffe, MBE, Honorary Secretary, Middlesbrough Savings Committee, Yorkshire, North Riding.
- Alfred Burling Swayne, Headmaster, The Royal School for the Deaf and Dumb, Margate.
- Clifford Charles Taylor, Principal Clerk, Office of the Town Clerk, City of London.
- Alderman Jane Monday Taylor, JP. For services to Agriculture in Berkshire.
- Wilfred Sydney James Thornington, deputy director of Audit, Exchequer and Audit Department.
- Gwynneth Loveday Thurburn, Principal, Central School of Speech and Drama.
- James Alexander O'Donnell Timoney, Principal, Ministry of Labour and National Service.
- Mary Trevelyan, Adviser to Oversea Students, University of London.
- Eric Cecil Trotman. For political services in Surrey.
- Albert Turkington, County Commandant, Ulster Special Constabulary.
- Geoffrey Arthur Virley Tyson, Chief Test Pilot, Saunders-Roe Ltd., Cowes, Isle of Wight.
- The Reverend Percy Cyril Underbill, Secretary, Incorporated Association of Preparatory Schools.
- John Lionel Symonds Vidler, Governor, HM Prison, Maidstone.
- Harold Griffin Vyse, MRCS, LRCP, chairman, Royal Air Force Benevolent Fund Committee in Jamaica.
- Ruth Christabel Walder (Mrs. Wesierska), National General Secretary, Young Women's Christian Association of Great Britain.
- Alexander Edward Walker, MBE, Actuary of the Aberdeen Savings Bank.
- Raymond Curteis Warren, MBE, Principal Inspector of Accidents, Accidents Investigation Branch (Civil Aviation), Ministry of Transport and Civil Aviation.
- William Ewart Watts, Superintending Examiner, Patent Office, Board of Trade.
- William Arthur Reginald Webster, MBE, Senior Organisation Officer, HM Treasury.
- Harold Weston, Esq:, Generation Engineer, Belfast Corporation Electricity Department.
- Captain John Whitehouse, Commodore Captain, MV Reina del Pacifico, Pacific Steam Navigation Company.
- Harold Whitfield, chief executive officer, Ministry of Health.
- Arthur William Wilkins, HM Inspector of Schools, Ministry of Education.
- Ivy Christabel Adelaide Willett. For political services in Hampshire.
- Mary Frances Williams, chairman, Local Health Committee for Cornwall.
- Verona Maud Wallace Williamson, chairman, Scottish Executive Committee, The Girl Guides Association.
- Samuel Wilsdon, assistant director of Victualling, Admiralty.
- Reginald Arthur Lawrence Wyatt, Head of Branch, Ministry of Pensions and National Insurance.
- Ralph Wynn. For political and public services in Skipton.
- Captain Graeme Chamley Wynne, Narrator, Historical Section, Cabinet Office.
- The Reverend Robert Proudfoot Roy Anderson, lately Minister of the Church of Scotland in Rome.
- Margaret Elizabeth Barraclough, MBE, First Secretary (Information) at Her Majesty's Embassy in Rangoon.
- Randolph John Blair, First Secretary (Legal Division) at Her Majesty's Embassy in Vienna.
- Douglas Charles Mahisra Rivett-Carnac, First Secretary (Information) at Her Majesty's Embassy in Bangkok.
- Lieutenant-Colonel William John Hendy Courtis (Retired), lately Temporary Chief Executive Officer, Herford, United Kingdom High Commission in Germany.
- Robert Dalziel, British subject resident in Argentina.
- Charles Francis Seton De Winton, British Council Representative in Turkey.
- Edward Philip Gibbons, lately Group Inspector, Northern Group, Sudan Gezira Board.
- Percival Richard Morgan. For services to Anglo-Belgian relations.
- John Vere Rintoul, lately Deputy Permanent Under-Secretary, Ministry of Finance, Sudan Government.
- Thomas Russell, MC, lately British Resident, Herford, United Kingdom High Commission in Germany.
- John Arthur Montague Sallis, British subject resident in Iraq.
- Rex Victor Johnston-Smith, lately Second Secretary at Her Majesty's Embassy in Saigon.
- William Bernard Neville-Terry, Her Majesty's Consul in Bari.
- Daisy Estelle Thompson, MBE, Headmistress of the English High School for Girls, Istanbul.
- Hope Gilchrist Wise, British subject resident in Egypt.
- Charles Walter Yates, lately British Council Representative in Colombia.
- Mabel Jewell Baker, Headmistress of Walford House School, Adelaide, and President of the Headmistresses' Association, State of South Australia.
- Ralph Milton Cleveland. For municipal and public services in Salisbury, Southern Rhodesia.
- Alice Gordon Elliott, JP. For social welfare services in the State of Tasmania.
- Frank Elliott, formerly Chief Government Mining Engineer, Southern Rhodesia.
- Samuel Alfred Germond, Educational Secretary of the Paris Evangelical Missionary Society in Basutoland.
- Eric John Hooker Hannay, Chairman of the Assam Branch, Indian Tea Association.
- Harold Hanslow, an irrigation fanner in the State of Victoria. For public services.
- William Charles Burke Harrison, LRCPI, LRCSI, Director of Medical Services for Northern Rhodesia, Federation of Rhodesia and Nyasaland.
- Richard Henry Hicks, Director of the Child Welfare Department, State of New South Wales.
- Humphrey Hutchinson, formerly Principal Agricultural Officer, Swaziland.
- Cyril Everett Isaac, formerly Member of the Legislative Council, State of Victoria. For public services.
- John Morrison MacDonald. For municipal and public services in Bulawayo, Southern Rhodesia.
- Frank John McIntosh, Chief Engineer of the Rhodesia Railways at Bulawayo, Federation of Rhodesia and Nyasaland.
- The Reverend Brother Charles Alphonsus Mogg, Superior of the Christian Brothers College at Rostrevor, State of South Australia.
- Charles Athole Murray, Director of Conservation and Extension, Ministry of Agriculture, Federation of Rhodesia and Nyasaland.
- Clement Ray Nichols, Chief Commissioner of the Scout Movement in the State of Victoria.
- Margaret Curtis-Otter, State Commissioner of the Girl Guides' Movement, State of Victoria.
- Frederick Alexander Robertson, JP. For municipal and social welfare services in Camperdown, State of Victoria.
- Gordon Thripp, Deputy Principal, Indian Air Force Technical Training College, Jalahalli, India.
- Squadron Leader Charles Philip Gregory Wade, Chairman of the Delhi Branch, United Kingdom Citizens' Association, India.
- Denis Patrick Witheriff, Under-Secretary, Department of Labour and Industry and Social Welfare, State of New South Wales.
- Pastor Christopher Albert Zweck, of the Evangelical Lutheran Church in the State of South Australia.
- Ayub Ali, MBE, lately Assistant Secretary, Establishment Division, Kenya.
- Samuel Hanson Amissah. Principal, Wesley College, Kumasi, Gold Coast.
- Monsignor John Cross Anyogu, Vicar-General of the Archdiocese of Onitsha, Eastern Region, Nigeria.
- George Charles Waite. Baldwin, Executive Engineer, Public Works Department, Northern Rhodesia.
- Monsignor Enrico Bonnici. For public services in Malta.
- John Jefferis Bryan, Chief Engineer, Singapore Airport.
- Robert Sandford Campbell. For public services in Mombasa, Kenya.
- Dalton Chadee, JP. For public services in Trinidad.
- Kenneth Graham Chard, Government Printer, Uganda.
- Chung Chao Lung. For public services in North Borneo.
- John Desmond Clark, Curator of the Rhodes-Livingstone Museum, Northern Rhodesia.
- George Alfred North-Coombes, deputy director of Agriculture, Mauritius.
- Kenneth Martin Cowley, Secretary for African Affairs, Kenya.
- Charles Scott Cree, Conservator of Forests, British Honduras.
- Porphyries Dikaios, Curator of the Cyprus Museum.
- Albert George Easton. For public services in Northern Rhodesia.
- Edward Wilfrid Ellison, Permanent Secretary to the Ministry of Communications and Aviation, Federation of Nigeria.
- The Reverend Brother William de Sales Foley, lately Education Adviser to the Government of Gibraltar.
- Andrew Morris Gerrard, Commissioner of the Cayman Islands.
- Maurice William Gibbon, deputy director of Agriculture, Northern Region, Nigeria.
- Harold Brockett Gibson. For public services in Fiji.
- Andrew Vincent Gill, Secretary, East African Airways Corporation.
- Kenneth Lindsay Grant. For public services in Trinidad.
- John Lyall Greig, Director of Agriculture, North Borneo.
- Hamed s/o Salehe bin Hamed el Busaidy, MBE, Liwali of Dar es Salaam, Tanganyika.
- Major James Harrow, MBE, Defence Security Officer, Malta.
- Edward Charles William Howard. For public services in the Federation of Nigeria.
- Norman Humphrey, Agricultural and Forestry Officer, St. Helena.
- Kenneth Russell Hunte. For public services in Barbados.
- Lieutenant Colonel Eric Methuen Vivian James, Commissioner of Police, Leeward Islands.
- Horace Kadoorie. For public services in Hong Kong.
- Robin Kingsford Kerkham, assistant director of Agriculture (Special Development), Uganda.
- The Reverend Elijah Titus Latunde. For public services in the Western Region, Nigeria.
- The Venerable Archdeacon Jonathan Olumide Lucas, DD, Archdeacon of Lagos.
- Thomas Carew Luke, MBE, Chief Establishment Officer, Sierra Leone.
- Major Edward Walter Moyle Magor, MBE, Secretary for Defence, Kenya.
- John Andrew Mahoney, MBE, JP. For public services in the Gambia.
- Jerry Auret Marais, Postmaster-General, Fiji.
- Evelyn Doris Mather, Principal, Education Department, Eastern Region, Nigeria.
- Earle Anthony Maynier, Permanent Secretary, Ministry of Trade and Industry, Jamaica.
- John Swinton Meredith, MB, ChB, Medical Specialist, Tanganyika.
- Matayo Mugwanya, Omulamuzi (Chief Justice), Buganda Government.
- Malam Muhammadu, MBE, Emir of Fika, Northern Region, Nigeria.
- Ong Piah Teng. For public services in Singapore.
- Lieutenant Colonel Robert Quigley. For public services in the Gold Coast.
- William Mathias Quin, MB, FRCS (Ed.) lately Senior Surgical Specialist, Sierra Leone.
- Charles McConaghy Ross, MB, BCh, Senior Leprosy Officer, Northern Region, Nigeria.
- Richard Neville Seeman, Oversea Audit Service, Director of Audit, Eastern Region, Nigeria.
- Robert Archibald Surtees Shotter. For public services in Negri Sembilan, Federation of Malaya.
- Shum Wai Yau. For public services in Hong Kong.
- Cuthbert Smail. For public services in Mombasa, Kenya.
- Thomas Edward Smith, Supervisor of Federal Elections, Federation of Malaya.
- Roger Faryon Stowell, Director of Education, Nyasaland.
- Roland Vivian Trace, Director of Public Works, Electricity and Land Survey, Zanzibar.
- Richard Archer Wallington, Headmaster, Mbeya School, Tanganyika.
- Charles Fisher Williams, Commissioner of Lands, Gold Coast.
- Syed Zain bin Hasson Al-Aidroos. For public services in Aden.

Honorary Officers

- Pengiran Haji anak Mohammed Alam bin Pengiran anak Abdul Rahman, Second Minister to the Sultan of Brunei.
- Lee Siew Joo, JP. For public services in Negri Sembilan, Federation of Malaya.
- Yaacob bin Abdul Latiff, Director of Information Services, Federation of Malaya.

==== Member of the Order of the British Empire (MBE) ====
Military Division

Royal Navy

- Lieutenant (S) Reginald Charles Anderson.
- Temporary Senior Commissioned Air Engineer Albert George Aplin, (Retired).
- Temporary Commissioned Engineer William Claude Beck.
- Temporary Lieutenant-Commander (Sp.) Alfred Charles Burgess, Royal Naval Volunteer Reserve.
- Senior Commissioned Gunner Frederick James Edwin Goodman.
- Instructor Lieutenant-Commander Francis Thomas Michell, (Retired).
- Lieutenant (L) Harold John Middleton, (Retired).
- Lieutenant-Commander Bertie Newton Pople, (Retired).
- Senior Commissioned Gunner Jack Rea.
- Lieutenant-Commander William Ernest Read.
- Captain (Quartermaster) William Robson, Royal Marines.
- Lieutenant-Commander Basil Loftus Gwinnett Sharp, VRD, Royal Naval Volunteer Reserve.
- Lieutenant-Commander Cecil Frederick Harbourne Watson, (Retired).
- Lieutenant-Commander Graham Leslie Williams, Malayan Royal Naval Volunteer Reserve.

Army

- Major (Quartermaster) James Aberdein, TD, (76045), Royal Army Medical Corps, Territorial Army.
- 21014277 Warrant Officer Class II Dudley William Abraham, Honourable Artillery Company (Infantry), Territorial Army.
- S/54450 Warrant Officer Class I Ralph Edward Pritchard Allsop, Royal Army Service Corps.
- 7879500 Warrant Officer Class I William Ross Armit, Royal Tank Regiment, Royal Armoured Corps.
- Major (Quartermaster) Walter Atlee Armstrong (121460), The Loyal Regiment (North Lancashire).
- Major Norman Alexander Barber, TD, (38017), Royal Army Service Corps, Territorial Army.
- 21193002 Warrant Officer Class I Thomas Edmund Barber, Corps of Royal Electrical and Mechanical Engineers, Territorial Army.
- Major (acting) John Joseph Barclay, MC, 13th Norfolk Battalion, Home Guard.
- S/222623294 Warrant Officer Class II Leslie Jack Berry, Royal Army Service Corps, Territorial Army.
- 2567222 Warrant Officer Class II Paul Birch, The King's Regiment (Liverpool), Territorial Army.
- Captain Peter Blunt (335303), Royal Army Service Corps.
- Major Ronald John Denys Eden Buckland (165022), Coldstream Guards.
- Major (Quartermaster) Richard Thorpe Burkimsher (178904), Royal Army Service Corps.
- W/12283 Warrant Officer Class II Catherine Margaret Cheverill, Women's Royal Army Corps, Territorial Army.
- Captain Harry Francis Childs, 19th/20th Hampshire Battalion, Home Guard.
- Major (acting) Arthur Leonard Michael Cook, TD, (75206), Army Cadet Force.
- Major (T.I.G.) Cecil Edward Corke (168083), Royal Regiment of Artillery.
- Major (temporary) James Alan Comrie Cowan (245350), The Rifle Brigade (Prince Consort's Own).
- 4611586 Warrant Officer Class I William Davies, The Glider Pilot and Parachute Corps.
- Major (temporary) Herbert Arthur Dilley (314001), The York and Lancaster Regiment (Employed List (4)).
- Captain Betty Elliott (359695), Women's Royal Army Corps, Territorial Army.
- Major Charles Wilson Evans (261714), Royal Regiment of Artillery, Territorial Army.
- 1061877 Warrant Officer Class I William Edward Farrow, Corps of Royal Electrical and Mechanical Engineers.
- Major (Staff-Quartermaster) Joseph Flynn (150544), Employed List 2.
- 22268846 Warrant Officer Class II George Edward Gander, Royal Armoured Corps, Territorial Army.
- Major James Hynd Graham (220397), The Parachute Regiment, Territorial Army.
- Major (acting) Godfrey Grant (332429), Army Cadet Force.
- Major Henry Grant (237837), Corps of Royal Engineers, Territorial Army.
- Captain David Gray (419844), The Argyll and Sutherland Highlanders (Princess Louise's), Territorial Army.
- Major Herbert George Griffiths (161336), The South Lancashire Regiment (Prince of Wales's Volunteers) (Employed List (4)).
- 1875870 Warrant Officer Class II William Derrick Hall, Corps of Royal Engineers.
- Captain Vernon Montague Hammer, 35th/33rd Essex Battalion, Home Guard.
- Major (Quartermaster) William Jonah Harrison (232217), Corps of Royal Engineers.
- Captain Robert Leonard Howell, TD, (88631), Royal Regiment of Artillery, Territorial Army.
- Major (acting) Bertram Charles Jolley (148679), Combined Cadet Force.
- Major Sydney Lack (245125), Royal Regiment of Artillery (Employed List (3)).
- Major (Quartermaster) Walter Garnet Lewis (131061), The South Wales Borderers.
- Major (Quartermaster) Leonard Leyland (144050), Royal Army Medical Corps, Territorial Army.
- 1466236 Warrant Officer Class II Leslie Arthur Thomas Libby, Royal Regiment of Artillery, Territorial Army.
- Major Henry Dickenson Marshall, TD, (71356), The Royal Lincolnshire Regiment, Territorial Army.
- 544652 Warrant Officer Class I William Crichton Marshall, DCM, 16th/5th Queen's Royal Lancers, Royal Armoured Corps.
- ER2731646 Warrant Officer Class I (acting) Alfred Percy Maskell, The King's Own Yorkshire Light Infantry.
- Major (Quartermaster) Albert Edward Arthur Stephen May, MC, (137752), Royal Regiment of Artillery.
- Major (Quartermaster) Walter Molton (173129), Royal Regiment of Artillery (Employed List (4)) (now retired).
- 22516100 Warrant Officer Class II John Sowerby Morgan, Royal Armoured Corps, Territorial Army.
- 823071 Warrant Officer Class H Arthur Stanley Munday, Royal Regiment of Artillery.
- 7589467 Warrant Officer Class I Alexander John Norster, Royal Army Ordnance Corps.
- Major (Quartermaster) Thomas Francis O'Brien (143883), Royal Regiment of Artillery.
- Major Jack Dermot O'Brien-Hill (382195), Royal Army Ordnance Corps.
- Captain Thomas Daniel O'Connell (326938), The King's Regiment (Liverpool).
- Captain (G.C.O.) Pahalmansing Gurung, IDSM, (388466), 2nd King Edward VII's Own Gurkha Rifles.
- 5617457 Warrant Officer Class II Ronald Petherick, The Devonshire Regiment.
- Major (temporary) James Patrick O'Haughey Pollock (138641), Irish Guards.
- Major (Quartermaster) Albert Frederick Pryor (279474), The Wiltshire Regiment (Duke of Edinburgh's).
- Major (acting) Ralph Harvey Raven, 10th Essex Battalion, Home Guard.
- Major (acting) Ernest Edward Foley Rayer, 5th Worcestershire Battalion, Home Guard.
- Captain (Quartermaster) Joseph Ridgway (356896), The Royal Warwickshire Regiment.
- Major (temporary) Charles Edward Rome (258958), The Middlesex Regiment (Duke of Cambridge's Own) (Employed List (3)).
- Major George Shave (218946), Royal Army Medical Corps.
- Major (acting) Harold Henry Davis Sinclair, 6th Sussex Battalion, Home Guard.
- Major Winifred Maud Smith (230026), Women's Royal Army Corps, Territorial Army.
- 5382330 Warrant Officer Class I Joseph Stevenson, DCM, The Oxfordshire and Buckinghamshire Light Infantry.
- Major Albert Ernest Thomas (141890), Army Catering Corps (now retired).
- Major Peter Hereward Tresidder, TD, (166488), Corps of Royal Engineers, Territorial Army.
- 2058541 Warrant Officer Class II Hubert Edward Tucker, The Parachute Regiment, Territorial Army.
- Major Thomas George Wagstaffe (124933), Royal Regiment of Artillery, Territorial Army.
- Lieutenant Frederick Cecil Walker (426287), Combined Cadet Force.
- Major Maurawaun Walshe, RRC, (209400), Queen Alexandra's Royal Army Nursing Corps.
- Lieutenant (Quartermaster) Francis Gay Walton (440215), Corps of Royal Engineers.
- Captain Clifford Richard Ward (234817), Corps of Royal Engineers.
- Major Edna Violet Watts (309801), Women's Royal Army Corps.
- Captain Mary Stark Waugh (405250), Women's Royal Army Corps, Territorial Army.
- 2614839 Warrant Officer Class I Edward Charles Weaver, Grenadier Guards.
- 22208389 Warrant Officer Class II Edwin Willmore, Royal Regiment of Artillery, Territorial Army.
- Major Basil Reginald Wood, TD, (85465), Royal Corps of Signals, Territorial Army.
- Captain (Quartermaster) Albert Henry Saunders (359795), Royal Corps of Signals (now retired); until recently on loan to the Government of India.

Royal Air Force

- Squadron Leader Maurice Hermiston (81768).
- Squadron Leader William John Randall (141952).
- Acting Squadron Leader Robert Barrow Evans (67367), Royal Air Force Volunteer Reserve.
- Acting Squadron Leader Arnold Frederic Ransford (57830).
- Flight Lieutenant Robert Noel Archer (184638).
- Flight Lieutenant John Alexander Matthew Davidson (155311).
- Flight Lieutenant Kenneth Ellis (501339).
- Flight Lieutenant Colin Glossop (59228).
- Flight Lieutenant Archibald Reginald Gerald Jackson, AFC, (128906).
- Flight Lieutenant Frederick Clifford Steele Jones (46997).
- Flight Officer Madeline Joyce Lincoln (5247), Women's Royal Auxiliary Air Force.
- Flight Lieutenant Ronald George Preece (57979).
- Flight Lieutenant Roderick George Robertson (134090), Royal Auxiliary Air Force.
- Flight Officer Sylvia Helen Scott (4756), Women's Royal Air Force.
- Flight Lieutenant William Stringer (48588).
- Flight Lieutenant Albert Lemcke Tauwhare (502405).
- Flight Lieutenant Geoffrey Bryning Tyler (2600837).
- Flight Lieutenant Sarel Johannes Wandrag (59480).
- Rab Tremma Abood Karim, X.46 (Retired), ex-Royal Air Force Levies, Iraq.
- Acting Flight Lieutenant Richard John Lloyd (62588), Royal Air Force Volunteer Reserve.
- Flying Officer Leonard Boyle (531000).
- Flying Officer Allan Harvey Norman (565120).
- Rab Emma Shlimon Bukko, X.95 (Retired), ex-Royal Air Force Levies, Iraq.
- Master Pilot Aleck Edser Heath (365456).
- Warrant Officer William Martin Allardyce (365643).
- Warrant Officer Joseph Beer (629964).
- Warrant Officer John Bishop (580267).
- Warrant Officer Albert Edward Brown (515310).
- Warrant Officer Thomas Alfred Bryant (508832).
- Warrant Officer John Thomas Campbell (514137).
- Warrant Officer Ronald Frank Cooper (564158).
- Warrant Officer Joseph Douds (516653).
- Warrant Officer Frederick Joseph Finlay (510441).
- Warrant Officer George Victor Halliday (518323).
- Warrant Officer Benjamin Harbourne (516983).
- Warrant Officer Henry Alexander Jude (560500).
- Warrant Officer Alexander Kinnaird, MM, (509367).
- Warrant Officer Francis Thomas McCrory (902168).
- Warrant Officer John Walmsley Mason (564241).
- Warrant Officer Percival Harold Mason, BEM, (511593).
- Warrant Officer Dickson Moor (540289).
- Warrant Officer Walter Fowler Perry (563567).
- Warrant Officer William Edward Robinson (571166).
- Warrant Officer John Sharpe (561924).
- Warrant Officer Ernest Ewan Smith (527335).

Civil Division

- Albert Hugh Abercrombie, District Commandant, Ulster Special Constabulary.
- Robert Adair, Senior Executive Officer, Ministry of Pensions and National Insurance.
- Thomas Coats Campbell Adam, Headmaster, Wallace High School, Lisburn, County Antrim.
- The Reverend Harold Reeves Allen, chairman, Streets and Social Organisations Savings Committee, Belfast.
- Walter Robert Allen, London Organising Secretary, National Society of Painters.
- Donald Alexander Alves, The Bridge Engineer, Somerset County Council.
- Victor Andersen, Intelligence Officer, British Services Security Organisation, War Office.
- Alfred James Andrew Armstrong, Engineer Technical, Grade I, Royal Aircraft Establishment, Ministry of Supply.
- Elsie Angela Arnison, Honorary Secretary, Citizens' Advice Bureau, Portsmouth.
- Allan Bertrand Ashbourne, Senior Information Officer, Central Office of Information.
- Observer Lieutenant George Douglas Austin, Senior Liaison Officer, No. 1 Group, Beckenham, Royal Observer Corps.
- George David Babister, County Chief Warden, Bedfordshire Civil Defence Corps.
- Hector Duncan MacDonald Bain, Deputy Senior Young Men's Christian Association Representative, Northern Army Group and British Troops in Austria.
- Mary Barcroft. For public services in County Down.
- Robert Thomas Barnard, Vice-chairman, Carnforth Urban District Council, Lancashire.
- Mildred Mary Rachel Baskett, Housing Manager, Westminster City Council.
- James Pollitt Bates. For political and public services in Cambridge.
- Philip Ernest Bath, Headmaster, Bramley Sunnyside Junior School.
- Kenneth Henderson Beale, Dry Dock Manager, Smith's Dock Co. Ltd., South Bank, Yorkshire.
- Geoffrey Edward Beard, managing director, E. W. Beard Ltd., Cirencester, Gloucestershire.
- Alderman Herbert Pybus Bell, JP, Vice-chairman, Darlington and District Employment Committee.
- Edmund Benjamin William Bennett, Higher Executive Officer, Air Ministry.
- Louisa Rebecca Bennett. For political services in North Islington.
- Kenneth Beswick, Treasurer, Kent River Board.
- Sydney George Betts, Commandant, Metropolitan Special Constabulary.
- Catherine Elizabeth Bilton. For political and public services in Tynemouth.
- Frank Bingley, General Manager, Dallow Lambert & Co. Ltd., Leicester.
- Michael George Black, Senior Auditor, Exchequer and Audit Department, Northern Ireland.
- John Blair, chairman, Larne Rural District Council, County Antrim.
- Arthur Bowen, Mechanical Engineer, British Thomson-Houston Co. Ltd., Rugby.
- Captain Owen Charles Bragge, MC, DCM, DL, Member, Dorset Agricultural Executive Committee.
- Major Reginald John Bricknell, Assistant County Agricultural Officer (Executive) Devon, Ministry of Agriculture, Fisheries and Food.
- Basil Brightmore, Area Manager, Army Kinema Corporation, North Malaya.
- Mary Augusta Brinnand, Technical Nursing Officer, Ministry of Labour and National Service.
- Marjorie Joyce Brown, Superintendent, Cornwall County Council Reception Home for Children.
- Teresa Muriel Brown, Higher Executive Officer, Board of Trade.
- Clement George Burrows, Chief Superintendent, Somerset Constabulary.
- Raymond Cheswardine Butters, Chief Machine Progress Superintendent, English Electric Co. Ltd., Stafford.
- William Carrington, Assistant Manager, Shirebrook Colliery, East Midlands Division, National Coal Board.
- Arthur Maurice Chamberlain. For services to the Boy Scouts Association.
- George Henry Charles Chapman, lately Higher Executive Officer, British Museum.
- George Stanley Chopping, Staff Clerk, Privy Council Office.
- Arthur Dudley Church, Senior Executive Officer, Ministry of Pensions and National Insurance.
- Alfred Wyness Nile Clark, Assistant Principal Clerk, Board of Inland Revenue.
- Frederick James Clements, Higher Executive Officer, Commonwealth Relations Office.
- Albert Daniel Connolly, Vice-chairman, Enniskillen Branch, County Fermanagh, British Legion.
- Nicholas George Cook. For political and public services in Staffordshire.
- Percy George Cooper, Higher Executive Officer, Post Office Savings Department, General Post Office.
- Wilfrid Herbert John Cooper, Senior Executive Officer, HM Treasury.
- Hubert Brayshaw Cordingley, JP. For political and public services in Lancashire.
- Alfred Howard Cornish, JP. For public services in Berkshire.
- Montague Costa, Senior Executive Officer, Ministry of Agriculture, Fisheries and Food.
- Isabella Cowie, JP. For political and public services in Banffshire.
- Cyril Ernest Cox, MC, Higher Executive Officer, Air Ministry.
- Frederick Albert Crouch, Inspector, Aeronautical Inspection Directorate, Ministry of Supply.
- John Kenneth Hutt Cunningham, Divisional Officer, Grade I, London Fire Brigade.
- John Stanley Curphey, Steel Plant Manager, Dorman Long (Steel) Ltd., Middlesbrough.
- Gladys Curtis, Honorary Secretary, Letchworth Savings Committee, Hertfordshire.
- Sidney Robert Dall, Senior Executive Officer, Board of Trade.
- Charles Cecil Davies, Electrical Engineer, Admiralty.
- Herbert Davies, Senior Litigation Clerk, Ministry of Agriculture, Fisheries and Food.
- Ralph Davies, Inspector of Taxes, Board of Inland Revenue.
- George Herbert William Davis, Superintendent, Cardiff City Police Force.
- Edith Muriel Dawson, Senior Executive Officer, Foreign Office.
- Allan Knightley Dewdney, Officer-in-Charge, Movements Control, British Overseas Airways Corporation.
- William McMillan Dick, Actuary of the Preston Savings Bank.
- John Dinwoodie, Superintendent and Deputy Chief Constable, Ayrshire Constabulary.
- James William Dix, Assistant Superintendent of Works, British Army of the Rhine.
- Laura Agnes Doel, JP. For public services in Merton, Surrey.
- Godfrey Ernest Drewett, Divisional Superintendent, Westinghouse Brake and Signal Company Ltd., Chippenham.
- Bernard Henry Du Feu, Assistant Regional Manager, London South Eastern Region, Central Land Board and War Damage Commission.
- Emma Wilhelmine Nicol Duffus. For services to the Scottish Council of Social Service.
- Dorothy Margaret Duncan, Welfare Officer, British Council.
- Margaret Duncan, Member, Scottish Savings Committee.
- William Duncan. For political services in Belfast.
- Ethel Marian Dunlop. For political and public services in Derby.
- Edward Othon Dunne, Clerk, Grade II, Ministry of Pensions and National Insurance.
- Leslie Durno, Livestock Husbandry Officer, Grade II, Ministry of Agriculture, Fisheries and Food.
- Squadron Leader Thomas Murray Dutton, Chairman of Committee, No. 1366 (City of Chester) Squadron, Air Training Corps.
- John Thomas Cross Bales, lately Head of Crew Department, Shaw Savill & Albion Co. Ltd.
- Catherine Eardley, Ward Sister, Whiston Hospital, near Prescot, Lancashire.
- Edward Willie Raven Ede, Headmaster, Garden County Junior School, Brighton.
- Muriel Bessie Edney, Headmistress, Langstone Junior Girls' School, Copnor, Portsmouth.
- Isaac John Daniel Edwards, Traffic Manager, London Airport, Airwork Ltd.
- Sydney Reed Eshelby, Principal Probation Officer, Essex.
- George William Essex, Deputy Labour Relations Officer (Headquarters), Central Electricity Authority.
- Handel Evans. For political and public services in Gower.
- Henry James Evans, Deputy Commander, Metropolitan Police Force.
- Lillian Maud Evans. For political services in Kent.
- Lionel Ridge Eves, Senior Executive Officer, War Office.
- Thomas Farmer, Senior Executive Officer, Forestry Commission.
- Horace William Featherstone, Senior Executive Officer, London Region, Ministry of Fuel and Power.
- Knightley Harry O'Dowd Maule-ffinch, Senior Duty Editor, Foreign Services News Department, British Broadcasting Corporation.
- Audrey Kathleen Grace Finch, Officer in Charge, Ambulance Service, County Borough of East Ham.
- Jessie Vera Finlay, JP. For political and public services in Ayrshire.
- Lieutenant-Commander Alexander Finlayson, DSC, Royal Naval Reserve, Honorary Secretary, Stornoway Station, Royal National Lifeboat Institution.
- Alderman George Flintham, JP, chairman, North District Committee, Lincolnshire (Kesteven) Agricultural Executive Committee.
- Lieutenant-Colonel Gerald Maurice Flood, Training Service Officer, Grade 1, Ministry of Labour and National Service.
- Edward Francis Follwell, Assistant Manager, Naval Canteen Service, Navy, Army and Air Force Institutes.
- Joseph Andrew Foster, District House Coal Officer, Wednesbury and Darlaston.
- Albert Leonard Frisby, Chief Clerk, Telephone Manager's Office, Bedford, General Post Office.
- The Very Reverend Canon George Joseph Galbraith, MC, St. Andrew's (Roman Catholic) Cathedral, Glasgow.
- Ronald Clifton Gambling, Executive Officer, Ministry of Pensions and National Insurance.
- William John Greig Garlick, Manager, City of London Employment Exchange, Ministry of Labour and National Service.
- Harley Ronald Gates, Senior Executive Officer, Ministry of Education.
- Olga Margaret Gimson, JP, Deputy County President, Leicestershire Branch, British Red Cross Society.
- Robert Ashleigh Glegg, MD, ChB, Honorary Secretary, East Sussex County Housing Association for the Aged Ltd.
- Arthur Gold, DCM, MM, Inspector, Immigration Branch, Home Office.
- Fred Conrad Golledge, lately Member, Shepton Mallet District Committee, Somerset Agricultural Executive Committee.
- Ernest Henry Good, lately Executive Officer, Ministry of Works.
- Eleanor Barbara Buckley Gough, Teleprinter Superintendent, London Airport, Ministry of Transport and Civil Aviation.
- Roland Geoffrey Gouk, Factory Manager, Huntley, Boorne & Stevens Ltd., Reading, Berkshire.
- James Brown Sylvester Gould, lately Higher Executive Officer, National Assistance Board.
- Edwin Thomas Grattidge, Chief Engineer, John M. Henderson & Co. Ltd., Aberdeen.
- William Gray, Chief Inspector of Weights and Measures for the City of Leicester.
- Sydney Herbert Groom, Senior Research Assistant (Guide Lecturer), Science Museum.
- Norah Guest, Home Work Organiser, Remploy Ltd.
- Cecilia Emily Maud Gummow, Member for Mid-Surrey, National Savings Assembly.
- George Gunn, Generation Engineer (Operation), South of Scotland Electricity Board.
- Lieutenant-Colonel Walter Stanley Hack. For political services in Worthing.
- Joe Haigh, Draughtsman, Whipp & Bourne Ltd., Rochdale, Lancashire.
- Frederick Carl Hall, Higher Executive Officer, Air Ministry.
- Walter Edward Hall, Chief Officer, Bath Fire Brigade.
- Jane Barrow Hammond, Sister, Thornbury Hospital, Gloucestershire.
- Ellis Pedley Hancock, Assistant District Commercial Manager, Swansea, Western Region, British Railways.
- Alexander Webster Hanton, Divisional Organiser, Amalgamated Engineering Union, Glasgow and West of Scotland.
- Grace Maureen Harbinson, Programme Editor, Radio Times, British Broadcasting Corporation.
- Richard Harold Harral, Sub-Area Manager, North Western Electricity Board.
- Francis David Harris, General Offices Manager, Raw Cotton Commission.
- Herbert George Stanley Harris, Clerk (Higher Grade), Board of Inland Revenue.
- William Edward Harris, DSC, Engineer II, Atomic Energy Research Establishment, Harwell.
- Alfred Henry Harvey, Senior Executive Officer, Export Credits Guarantee Department, Board of Trade.
- Samuel James Havard, Trade Union Vice-chairman, West Wales Committee, Welsh Board for Industry.
- Robert Haworth, Chief Draughtsman, Santon Ltd., Newport, Monmouthshire.
- Leslie Frank Hendy. For political and public services in Orpington.
- Michael Patrick Herlihy, MM, Senior Executive Officer, Ministry of Transport and Civil Aviation.
- Phyllis Mary Hiles, Executive Officer, Ministry of Pensions arid National Insurance.
- Frances Mabel Hobbs, Controller of Typists, Home Office.
- Muriel Ernestine Hockaday, Executive Officer, War Office.
- Roland Gerald Hodges, Senior Experimental Officer, Radar Research Establishment, Ministry of Supply.
- Robert Francis Holliday, Area Engineer, I London Telecommunications Region, General Post Office.
- Ronald Walter Holman, Senior Experimental Officer, Ministry of Defence.
- Alderman Christobel Mary Hood, JP, chairman, Erpingham Rural District Council, Norfolk.
- Fred Hornsby, Chief Sales Superintendent, Telephone Manager's Office, Manchester, General Post Office.
- Charles Herbert Howard. For services to malarial research.
- Henry Reginald Howard, Senior Executive Officer, Ministry of Agriculture, Fisheries and Food.
- Charles Granville Hulse, Senior Executive Officer, Board of Trade.
- Arthur James Hunnisett, Press and Information Officer, Board of Customs and Excise.
- George Lidster Hutt, Director and Secretary, Dryers Ltd., West Chilton Trading Estate, North Shields.
- Arthur Ibbotson, Chief Draughtsman, Plant Department, Metropolitan-Vickers Electrical Co. Ltd., Manchester.
- Howard Stanley James, JP, deputy chairman, Pembrokeshire Agricultural Executive Committee.
- Ruth Adeline Jameson, Typist, Grade 1, Ministry of Labour and National Service.
- Thomas Alfred Jarman. For public services in Abergwili, Carmarthen.
- Alice Jarrett. For services to the welfare of school children in Kensington.
- William Johnston, Assistant Postmaster, Head Post Office, Glasgow.
- Robert Athelstan Jolliffe, Surveyor (Field) Grade II, Ordnance Survey Department.
- Alfred Joseph Jones, Inspector of Taxes, Board of Inland Revenue.
- Margaret Wynn Jones, District Nurse-Midwife, Merionethshire.
- Francis Newlove Judson, Industrial General Sales Manager, Mobil Oil Co. Ltd.
- Thelma Lilian Julian, Estimates and Analytical Studies Officer, British Overseas Airways Corporation.
- Alderman Fred Lord Kay, JP, chairman, Middleton Local Employment Committee and Disablement Advisory Committee.
- Edward Andrew Kelly, Civilian Officer, Royal Air Force Luqa, Malta.
- James Albert Kermode, Chief Engineer, SS Maipura, Thos. & Jno. Brocklebank Ltd.
- Marjorie Key, Senior Executive Officer, Ministry of Pensions and National Insurance.
- Edgar Leonard Killip, AFC, Operations Research and Planning Manager, British European Airways.
- Ernest Hector King, Production Manager, Monmouthshire Board Mills Ltd., Newport.
- Reginald Elliott Knight, Clerical Officer, Admiralty.
- Frank Constant Lamacq, Senior Executive Officer, Colonial Office.
- Commander (S) Norman Elders Lamb, RD, Royal Naval Reserve, District Superintendent, Mercantile Marine Office, Newcastle upon Tyne, Ministry of Transport and Civil Aviation.
- George Lewis Langridge, lately Chief Clerk, Miss Agnes Weston's Royal Sailors Rests.
- Edgar Claude Theodore Lawrence, Higher Executive Officer, Ministry of Housing and Local Government.
- Phyllis Armitage Lee. For public services in Cheshire.
- Alfred Stanford Leggatt, Skipper-Owner, MFV Romulus.
- Daniel Lewis, JP, District Secretary, Amalgamated Engineering Union, Newport District.
- Douglas Harold Lightfoot, Senior Administrative Assistant, Clerk's Department, Kent County Council.
- Annie Davidson Lindsay, Headmistress, Woodlands Nursery School for the Deaf, Glasgow.
- William Little, lately Executive Officer, Passport Office.
- Lionel John Lloyd. For services to amateur drama in Glamorganshire.
- Captain Harry Pinfield Long, Honorary Treasurer, Worcestershire, British Legion.
- Robert Loudon, Senior Executive Officer, Department of Health for Scotland.
- George Lovell, Chief Preventive Officer, King's Lynn, Board of Customs and Excise.
- Arthur Norman Lowe, Grade 3 Officer, Ministry of Labour and National Service.
- Lettice Dorothy Lowe, Youth Employment Officer, Surrey County Council.
- Malcolm Galbraith Macdonald, JP, Farmer, Island of Gigha, Argyllshire.
- Robert Alexander Macdonald, JP. For political services in Glasgow.
- Marietta Martin Macdougall, Matron, County Maternity Hospital, Bellshill, Lanarkshire.
- Catherine Angus McFeat, Honorary Secretary, Perth Brewery Savings Group.
- William Laird McKinlay. For services to Education and Youth Welfare work in Scotland.
- Mary Virtue Silburn McLeavy, JP. For political and public services in County Down.
- Mary McNaughtan. For services as District Nurse, Rossshire.
- William James McPherson, Farm Manager, Scottish Malt Distillers Ltd.
- David Arthur Mainds, MM, Secretary, Stockport Card Room Operatives and Ring Spinners' Association.
- Leonard Cyril Mainwood, lately Works Overseer, Grade II, HM Stationery Office.
- Hugh Waudby Malcolm, Senior Executive Officer, Commonwealth Relations Office.
- Doris Emily Malley, Senior Supervisor of Day Nurseries, Birmingham.
- Annie March. For political and public services in Selby.
- William Thomas Marsh, Area Planning and Progressing Manager, North Eastern Division, National Coal Board.
- William Stewart Martin, Chief Inspector, Brown Brothers (Aircraft) Ltd, Northampton.
- Edith Agnes Matheson, Centre Organiser, Aberdeen City, Women's Voluntary Services.
- William Henry Maulson, JP, Member, Holderness District Committee, East Riding of Yorkshire Agricultural Executive Committee.
- Alexander Gow Mearns, MD, Senior Lecturer, Department of Public Health and Social Medicine, University of Glasgow.
- William Ernest Valentine Mellows, Area Supervisor, Navy, Army and Air Force Institutes, Northern Command.
- Adam Harrison Menzies, Chief Engineer, Jute Industries Ltd.
- Sidney James Mew, Higher Executive Officer, Ministry of Pensions and National Insurance.
- Margaret Fairweather Michie, Teacher, Tarfside School, Glenesk, Angus.
- Charles John Miles, MM, Marine Engineer, British Transport Commission.
- Terence Charles Barry Miller, Assistant Motive Power Superintendent, Eastern Region, British Railways.
- Doris Hilda Mitchell, Ward Sister, Tuberculosis Ward, Mount Gold Hospital, Plymouth.
- John Calver Monger, DSC, Fishing Skipper, Research Vessel Ernest Holt, Ministry of Agriculture, Fisheries and Food.
- Alderman Frank Victor Moore, chairman, Lowestoft and District Employment Committee.
- Leonard Alfred John Moore, Senior Executive Officer, Board of Trade.
- James Henry Morrell, Higher Clerical Officer, Board of Customs and Excise.
- Frank Morris, Senior Experimental Officer, Ministry of Supply.
- Kenneth Percy Frederick Walter Morris, Organising Secretary, West London Road Safety Committee.
- Florence Elizabeth Morrison, Personal Assistant to the Secretary, Royal Aeronautical Society.
- Sydney Harry Carael Mound, Chief Motion Study Officer, Army Operational Research Group, War Office.
- Dorothy Dixon Murray, Departmental Sister, Premature Baby Unit, Sorrento Maternity Hospital, Moseley, Birmingham.
- Eric Irving Murray, Honorary Secretary, Portsmouth Savings Committee.
- Mildred Eliza Murray, Executive Officer, Scottish Home Department.
- Sybil Enid Murray. For public services, in Angus.
- Joseph Nettleton, Higher Executive Officer, London Postal Region, General Post Office.
- Harvey Newport, DCM, Headmaster, Stockport Approved School.
- Bernard Nicholls, Senior Executive Officer, Admiralty.
- Michael Hawke Nisbet, Secretary, Soldiers', Sailors' and Airmen's Families Association.
- William Bell O'Donoghue, Clerk of the Newry No. 1 and No. 2 Rural District Councils, County Down.
- Charles O'Hara, Vice-chairman, Londonderry County Council.
- Leonard Wilson Oliver, lately Alderman, Helston Borough Council, Cornwall.
- Alfred O'Sullivan, Service Manager, S. G. Brown Ltd., Watford, Hertfordshire.
- Charles John Ovey, Senior Executive Officer, Highways General Division, Ministry of Transport and Civil Aviation.
- George Henry Palmer, Deputy Secretary and Accountant, South Western Gas Board.
- Henry Antill Parfitt, Clerical Officer, Western Traffic Area, Ministry of Transport and Civil Aviation.
- Frederick George Parkin, Clerk and Steward, Rampton Hospital, Ministry of Health.
- Claude Chauc Parsons, First Officer, THV Patricia, Corporation of Trinity House.
- Anne Ives Partington, Regional Clothing Officer, South West England, Women's Voluntary Services.
- Alfred William Pattie, Inspector of Taxes (Higher Grade), Board of Inland Revenue.
- Cecil Arthur Pattison, Honorary Secretary, Newcastle upon Tyne Savings Committee.
- Wilfred David Peerless, BEM, Executive Officer, Foreign Office.
- William James Perrott, District Inspector, Royal Ulster Constabulary.
- William John Pettitt, Senior Executive Officer, Royal Ordnance Factory, Maltby, West Riding of Yorkshire.
- Walter Coleman Clifford Pharo, Grade 4 Officer, Branch "B" of the Foreign Service, Foreign Office.
- William Frederick Phellipps, lately Radiographer, Southmead Hospital, Bristol.
- Clare Theresa Pickering Supervisor, Mental Deficiency Occupation Centre, Newport, Isle of Wight.
- Stanley Watson Pike, Senior Assistant District Auditor, Leeds, Ministry of Housing and Local Government.
- Margaret Elsie Piper, Matron, General Hospital, Jersey.
- Nicoleta Suzanne Pomfret, attached War Office.
- Prysor Eifion Price, Honorary Secretary, Aberayron and New Quay Savings Committee, Cardiganshire.
- Doris Evelyn Howard Priest, District Nurse, Cirencester, Gloucestershire.
- Mary Isabella Halliburton Purves, Headmistress, Branton County Primary School, Powburn, Alnwick, Northumberland.
- John Horace Ramsbotham, chairman, Newcastle and North West Staffordshire Local Employment Committee.
- George Edward Randall, Radio Officer, SS Scottish Hawk, Siemens Brothers & Co. Ltd.
- Frederick Arthur Hart Rayner, Executive Officer, Registry of Shipping and Seamen, Ministry of Transport and Civil Aviation.
- John Charles Bisson Redfearn, Civil Hydrographic Officer, Admiralty.
- John Regan, Manager, Slough Employment Exchange, Ministry of Labour and National Service.
- Lilian Emily Richardson, Church Army Mission Sister, British Army of the Rhine.
- John Hunter-Rioch, General Manager, Cambridge Division, Eastern Gas Board.
- William Malcolm Ritchie, Secretary, Central Scottish Motor Transport Co. Ltd., Scottish Omnibuses Group.
- Harold Valentine Walker Robinson. For services to School Athletics in Wales.
- William George Rodgers, Branch Secretary, Derby and District Branch, National Federation of Building Trades Operatives.
- Douglas Cecil Rogers, Section Head, Standard Telephones and Cables Ltd., Ilminster, Somerset.
- Captain John Docwra-Rogers, Member of the Chapter-General of the Venerable Order of St. John of Jerusalem.
- William Robert Rose, Chief Mechanical Designer, General Electric Co. Ltd., Telephone Works, Coventry.
- Alan Rough, Chief Committee Clerk, Manchester Corporation.
- Irene Dring Royce. For political and public services in Willesden.
- Ivy Scott, Hospital Nursing Officer, Ministry of Health.
- Mary Isabella Scott, Executive Officer, Office of the Procurator Fiscal, Glasgow.
- Walter Mitchell Searle, Superintending Inspector, Aeronautical Inspection Service, No. 25 Maintenance Unit, Royal Air Force, Hartlebury.
- Alice Mary Shepherd. For political and public services.
- Cranidge Silverwood, Collector of Taxes (Higher Grade), Board of Inland Revenue.
- Joseph William Simmons, Principal Artificer, National Physical Laboratory, Department of Scientific and Industrial Research.
- Elsie Ellen Simpson. For political and public services in Morayshire.
- Herbert Skinner, lately Senior Executive Officer, Supreme Court Pay Office.
- Alderman Harold Slack, Member, Sheffield Employment Committee.
- Alma Philippa Norton-Smith, Clerical Officer, H.Q. Maintenance Command, Royal Air Force.
- Thomas Hall Smith, chairman, Lothians War Pensions Committee.
- Tom Smith, Higher Executive Officer, Institute of Army Education, War Office.
- Roland James Sparks, Executive Officer, Birmingham General Post Office.
- Cecil Sam Spencer, County Chief Warden, Northamptonshire Civil Defence Corps.
- William Frederick Spencer, Milk Movements Officer, Milk Marketing Board.
- Hubert John Standerwick, Higher Executive Officer, Nationalised Industries Division, Ministry of Transport and Civil Aviation.
- The Reverend Canon Ernest Henry Stenning, TD, President, Manx Motor Cycle Club.
- Mary Melland Stephens, Regional Hospital Specialist, Manchester, Women's Voluntary Services.
- Leslie Cyril Carbis Stevens, Higher Executive Officer, Ministry of Supply.
- Elizabeth Mollie Drew Stockman, Senior Organiser of School Meals, Devon Local Education Authority.
- Frederick James Stubbs, Superintendent of Works, Ministry of Works.
- Rhona Sugden. For political services in Kensington.
- Marian Teasdale Talbot. For political and public services in Walsall.
- Senior Commissioned Signal Boatswain Frederick Charles Tarling, MSM, Royal Navy (Retired), Section Minewatching Service Officer, Bristol, Admiralty.
- Harold James Terry, Chief Fire Officer, Derbyshire Fire Brigade.
- Margaret Anna Thomas, lately Headmistress, Stockton Wood Road County Infant School, Speke, Liverpool.
- Sydney Henry Thomas, Senior Executive Officer, Ministry of Fuel and Power.
- Robert Thomson, TD, Principal Probation Officer, Glasgow.
- John Thornberry, lately Superintendent and Deputy Chief Constable, Wakefield City Police Force.
- Edwin James Thurston, chairman, Hereford Savings Committee.
- Helen Thorburn Tinto. For political and public services in Glasgow.
- Herbert John Trotman, Higher Executive Officer, Air Ministry.
- Stephen Charles Turner, Higher Executive Officer, Ministry of Transport and Civil Aviation.
- Harry Stephen Turrell, Station Master, Euston Station, London Midland Region, British Railways.
- Cyril Burroughs Underwood, JP. For political and public services in Essex.
- Fred Wade, Chief Officer, Dudley Fire Brigade.
- Alice Walton, Scientific Adviser, Commonwealth Bureau of Agricultural and Parasitology, St. Albans.
- Walter Richard Ward, Chief Superintendent, Printing Department, Survey Production Centre, War Office.
- Captain John Russell Watson, DSC, RD, Master, SS Loch Dunvegan, David MacBrayne Ltd., Glasgow & Highland Royal Mail Steamers.
- Albert William Webster. For political and public services in Eastleigh.
- Frank West, Assistant Secretary, British Horological Institute.
- Charles William Whaler, Assistant Chief Engineer, Northern General Transport Company Ltd.
- Charles Ernest White, Assistant General Manager (Production), Brooke Marine Ltd., Lowestoft.
- Ernest Thomas White, Higher Executive Officer, Ministry of Pensions and National Insurance.
- Ernest Wilfred John White, Higher Executive Officer, Air Ministry.
- Minnie Whtttaker, Head of Women's Department, Stockport College for Further Education.
- Robert Albert William Wildash, Senior Executive Officer, Office of HM Procurator General and Treasury Solicitor.
- Bertram Stuart Williams, Senior Executive Officer, Ministry of Works.
- Horace Charles Williams, lately Fitting Shops Manager, The Bristol Aeroplane Company Ltd., Bristol.
- Sidney Ernest Williams, Higher Executive Officer, Admiralty.
- Thomas Nock Williams, Detective Superintendent, Worcestershire County Constabulary.
- Henry Fenwick Wilson, chairman, Tynemouth District Committee, Northumberland Agricultural Executive Committee.
- Harold Winder, chairman, Dewsbury, Batley and District War Pensions Committee.
- Florence Lee Wood. For political and public services in Cheshire.
- Lieutenant-Colonel Llewellyn Wood, MC, chairman, West Kesteven Local Savings Committee, Nottinghamshire.
- Thomas Woods, Senior Executive Officer, Paymaster General's Office.
- David Charles Wray, Deputy Principal Officer, Ministry of Agriculture, Northern Ireland.
- John Gustave Patrick Zierold, Technical Manager, Briggs Motor Bodies Ltd., Dagenham, Essex.
- Phyllis Mary Avery, British Pro-Consul at New York.
- Joseph Anthony Balbuena, Press Liaison Officer at Her Majesty's Embassy in Madrid.
- Napoleon Bartolo, British subject resident in Egypt.
- John Harold Bishop, lately Archivist at Her Majesty's Consulate-General at Hanoi. (Now at Rio de Janeiro.)
- The Reverend Walter Samuel Brooks, Church of England Chaplain in southwest France.
- Mary Irene Durlacher. Personal Assisitant to Her Majesty's Ambassador in Paris.
- Geoffrey Francis Edwards, TD, Temporary Senior Executive Officer, British Military Government, Berlin (British Sector).
- Major Evaline Goulding, Manager of a Salvation Army Children's Home in Santiago.
- The Reverend Cecil Frederick Green, Honorary Chaplain to the English Church in Casablanca.
- Alfred Samuel Keeling, Development Engineer in the Iraqi Directorate-General of Posts and Telegraphs, Bagdad.
- Eileen May Kendall, lately Controller of Midwives, Sudan Government.
- Norman Nicholson Lewis, lately Principal Instructor at the Middle East Centre for Arab Studies, Shemlan.
- Thomas Russell Little, British subject resident in Egypt.
- Allan Livingstone, Administrative Officer, British Council, Tokyo.
- Sydney Daniel Love, British subject resident in Cuba.
- George Ranald Campbell Lumsden, lately District Commissioner, Northern Kordofan, Sudan.
- David MacKenzie, lately Senior Executive Officer, Hanover, United Kingdom High Commission in Germany.
- Robert Butler Mills, TD, Visa Section, Her Majesty's Embassy, Bonn.
- Guy Edward Chaloner Pease, lately Lands Inspector, Khartoum Province, Sudan.
- Elsie Kate Spenser Remane, Grade 6 Officer, Branch "B" of the Foreign Service, at Her Majesty's Embassy in Washington.
- Dorothy Siordet Russell, British subject resident in Peru.
- Archibald Hampton Seabrook, British Consul at Tampico.
- Sylvio Joseph Tabone, British subject resident in Tunisia.
- Elsie May Turner, British Pro-Consul at Chicago
- Agatha Walsh, Senior Research Assistant, British Information Services, New York.
- Monica Amy Weston, Headmistress of the British Institute School, Madrid.
- Oswald Marchant Williams, British Council Representative in Denmark.
- Francis Geoffrey Wood, British Council Director of Studies, Lisbon Institute.
- Anne Adam, Senior Lady Clerk and Private Secretary to the Chief Justice of Basutoland, the Bechuanaland Protectorate and Swaziland.
- Mary Josephine Anderson, Assistant Hospitality Secretary, The Victoria League.
- William Edmund Barwick, President, Gilgandra Shire Council, State of New South Wales. For services during the floods.
- Keith James Darrell Benger. For honorary services to charitable organisations in Adelaide, State of South Australia.
- Sydney Henry Birrell, MC. For public services in the State of Victoria.
- Reginald Arthur Bourlay, Superintendent of Flying for Central African Airways, Federation of Rhodesia and Nyasaland.
- Reginald George Bray, President, Muswellbrook Shire Council, State of New South Wales. For services during the floods.
- Kathleen Mary Burrow. For social welfare services in the State of New South Wales.
- George Robert Burton. For services to ex-servicemen in the State of Victoria.
- John Carpenter, Secretary of the Branch in the State of South Australia of the Totally and Permanently Disabled Soldiers' Association.
- Christopher William Collins, a member of the staff of the Department of Customs and Excise, Federation of Rhodesia and Nyasaland.
- Charles Henry Valentine Cooke, a member of the staff of the Department of Customs and Excise, Federation of Rhodesia and Nyasaland.
- Vera Lilian Courtenay. For social welfare services in Launceston, State of Tasmania.
- Roy Richardson Cousins, Mayor of Muswellbrook, State of New South Wales. For services during the floods.
- George Chatfield Cramp, of Hobart, State of Tasmania. For public services.
- Charles Henry William Dale, Chairman of the Marandellas Town Management Board, Southern Rhodesia.
- William Henry Schorey Dickinson, JP. For municipal services in Kew, State of Victoria.
- Malcolm Martin Eigner, a member of the staff of the Rhodesia Railways at Bulawayo, Federation of Rhodesia and Nyasaland.
- William Edwin Field, Assistant Commissioner of Prisons, Federation of Rhodesia and Nyasaland.
- Gladys Isobel Grant. For social welfare services in the State of Victoria.
- John Henshilwood, a Councillor of the Shire of Mildura, State of Victoria, for over 35 years.
- Elsie Emily Hill, General Secretary and Matron of the Far West Children's Health Scheme, State of New South Wales.
- Edward George Hittersay, Resident Engineer, Mountain Road, Basutoland.
- Henry Roger George Howman, a Native Commissioner in Southern Rhodesia.
- James Russell Inskipp, a Native Commissioner in Southern Rhodesia.
- Clara Keenan, in charge of the Queen Elizabeth Clinic, Salisbury, Southern Rhodesia.
- Flora Bonthron Lawson, Honorary Vice-president and Chairman of the Managing Committee of "The Good Companions", Calcutta, India.
- William Patrick Leary, President, Talbragar Shire Council, State of New South Wales. For services during the floods.
- Clarence George Lewis, MSM, Group Secretary of the Branch in the State of South Australia of the Royal Institute of Public Administration.
- Thelma Constance Metcalfe. For social welfare services in the State of New South Wales.
- George Charles Nankivell, JP, of Queenstown, State of Tasmania. For municipal and social welfare services.
- The Reverend Frank Leslie Oliver, Chaplain, Port of Melbourne, State of Victoria.
- Rupert Ripley Sheppy, a Land Development Officer, Native Affairs Department, Southern Rhodesia.
- Joan Lucy Stokoe, President of the Delhi Branch, Young Women's Christian Association, and Chairman of the Delhi Area Benevolent Fund, India.
- Robert Malcolm Thomson, a member of the staff of the Department of Defence, Federation of Rhodesia and Nyasaland.
- Maud Wilkins, of Umtali, Southern Rhodesia. For social welfare services.
- Malam Abubakar, Madawakin Sokoto, Sokoto Native Authority Councillor, Northern Region, Nigeria.
- Gladys Addison. For public services in Seychelles.
- Paul Obiefuna Agbakobah, lately Administrative Assistant, Education Department, Eastern Region, Nigeria.
- Malam Saidu Alao, District Head, Owode, Ilorin Emirate, Northern Region, Nigeria.
- Shittu Alliyu Arogundade, Produce Officer, Agricultural Department, Western Region, Nigeria.
- John William Astwood, Acting District Commissioner, Caicos Islands, Jamaica.
- William Carlyle Baker. For public services in Fiji.
- Lewis Mataka Bandawe, High Court Interpreter, Nyasaland.
- George Ridley Barnley, Senior Entomologist, Medical Department, Uganda.
- Cyril Walter Barwell, Agricultural Officer, Kenya.
- Rosendo Martin Bautista, District Commissioner, Corozal, British Honduras.
- Anne Mary Behan, Queen Elizabeth's Oversea Nursing Service, Matron, Glendon Hospital, Montserrat, Leeward Islands.
- Uriah Josephus Bloomer, Inspector of Works, Public Works Department, Federation of Nigeria.
- George Hector Vivian Blythe, Veterinary Secretary, Veterinary Department, Federation of Nigeria.
- Louis Sammut Briffa, Higher Executive Officer, Lieutenant-Governor's Office, Malta.
- Frederick Somers Brown, Office Superintendent, Colonial Secretariat, Bermuda.
- Canon Yoeri Buninguire. For public services in Ankole, Uganda.
- William John Withers Burton, Senior Superintendent of Prisons, Federation of Malaya.
- Malcolm Archibald Campbell, Port Superintendent and Senior Pilot, Famagusta, Cyprus.
- Norman Joseph Carr, Chief Ranger, Department of Game and Tsetse Control, Northern Rhodesia.
- Jack Cater, Assistant Secretary, Colonial Secretariat, Hong Kong.
- Harold Philip Coombes. For public services in Nyasaland.
- Kenneth Windsor Cunningham, Assistant District Commandant, Kenya Police Reserve.
- John Hugh Rathbone Davies, District Officer, Northern Rhodesia.
- Henry Colyear Dawkins, Ecologist, Forest Department, Uganda.
- Herbert Alleyne Dowding. For public services in Barbados.
- John Gordon Stewart Drysdale, Administrative Officer, Somaliland.
- Ee Yew Kim, JP. For public services in Malacca, Federation of Malaya.
- Effiong Edet Ekpenyong, lately Supervising Teacher, Education Department, Eastern Region, Nigeria.
- Chief Etim Ekpenyong, Headmaster, Duke Town Primary School, Calabar, Eastern Region, Nigeria.
- Paul Evangelos Evangelides, Senior Technical Assistant, Public Works Department, Cyprus.
- Arthur Francis Farnfield, County Engineer, Afikpo County and District Council, Eastern Region, Nigeria.
- Harold Geoffrey Fildes, Chief Inspector of Public Works, Northern Region, Nigeria.
- Alexander Arthur Fisher, Senior Executive Engineer, Public Works Department, Federation of Malaya.
- The Reverend Patrick Stephen Fullen. For missionary services in Kenya.
- Hugh Frederick Fuller, First. Class Clerk, Customs Department, Corozal, British Honduras.
- Victor Akinmorin Gansallo, Pharmacy Superintendent, Medical Department, Western Region, Nigeria.
- Agnes Leopoldina George, Senior Nursing Sister, Federation of Nigeria.
- Samson Adeoye George. For public services in the Southern Cameroons, Federation of Nigeria.
- Jean Gordon Gibson. For services to the Girl Guide Movement in Northern Rhodesia.
- Vele Govinden, Assistant Postmaster General, Posts and Telegraphs Department, Mauritius.
- The Reverend John Rae Gray. For services to education in the Cayman Islands, Jamaica.
- Ephraim Greenwood, Mechanical Inspector, Public Works Department, Hong Kong.
- Joseph James Gunn, Municipal Secretary, Aden Municipality.
- Harry Haigh, MRCS, LRCP. For medical services in the Eastern Region, Nigeria.
- Henry Norman Martin Harvey, Superintendent of Police, Tanganyika.
- Richard Frederick Lancelot Hatchwell, Deputy Accountant-General, Northern Rhodesia.
- Norman Hewgill, Works Assistant, East African Railways and Harbours Administration.
- Amy Holdway, Queen Elizabeth's Oversea Nursing Service, Matron, Tanganyika.
- Renee Hollyer. For public services in Tanganyika.
- Gladys Chee Ing Hu. For medical services in Singapore.
- Norman Robinson James. For social and welfare services In Northern Rhodesia.
- Edward Harry Jobling, Principal, Blaize Memorial Institute, Abeokuta, Western Region, Nigeria.
- The Reverend Alonzo Irwin Johnson, Rector of Christchurch, Barbados.
- Cenydd Richards Jones, MB, BCh, Amerindian Medical Officer, British Guiana.
- Edward John Jones. For missionary and educational services in the Western Region, Nigeria.
- Krishna Chand Kapoor. For public services in Uganda.
- Henry William Denis Kearney, lately Administrative Officer, Kikuyu Guard, Kiambu District, Kenya.
- Philip John Kercher, Field Officer, Desert Locust Survey, East African Anti-Locust Directorate.
- Sister Florence Kernahan. For services to education in St. Lucia, Windward Islands.
- Dwarka Dass Kewal, Legal Office Assistant, Tanganyika.
- Hans Kristian Kristoffersen. For services to the Whaling industry in South Georgia, Falkland Islands.
- Malama Kubura, Native Administration Teacher, Northern Region, Nigeria.
- Daisy Mary Lafitte, Confidential Assistant, Procureur General's Office, Mauritius.
- Eileen Lambourne. For public services in the Gold Coast.
- Thomas Otho Lashley, Manager and Secretary, Housing Board, Barbados.
- Malam Muhammadu Lawal, Waziri, Zaria Native Authority and Adviser in Moslem Law to Northern House of Chiefs, Northern Region, Nigeria.
- Ada Constance Layzell. For missionary and educational services in the Western Region, Nigeria.
- Lee Eng Hoe, Office Assistant, Education Department, Singapore.
- May Lipschild. For public services in Northern Rhodesia.
- Edith Blanche Mary Lloyd. For public services in Kenya.
- Emeric Losonczi, Medical Officer of Health, British Honduras.
- Rowland Lyne, JP, ED. For public services in Singapore.
- Hamish Macgregor, Superintendent, Leper Settlement, Sarawak.
- George James Magembe, Assistant Education Officer, Tanganyika.
- Antoinette Mercieca, Secretary, British Institute, Gozo.
- The Reverend John Irvin Mitchell, Vicar of St. Martin, Barbados.
- Chief Ignatio Morai, Fort Hall District, Kenya.
- William Henry Mosbergen, JP. For social welfare services in Singapore.
- Doreen Anne Murray, LRCS, LRCP, Resident. Medical Officer, Colony Hospital, Grenada, Windward Islands.
- Thomas Murray, Assistant Representative, British Council, Jamaica.
- James Desmond Howard Neill, Principal Assistant to Commissioner for Labour, Singapore.
- Hugh Francis Connac Nelson, Chief Drilling Superintendent, Northern Region, Nigeria.
- Ian Hugh Norton, District Officer, Tanganyika.
- Austen Chamberlain Nyante, Reclamation Officer, Department of Tsetse Control, Gold Coast.
- Owolabi Anifoshe Omololu, MB, ChB, School Medical Officer, Lagos, Federation of Nigeria.
- Antonio Okello Opwa, Treasurer, Acholi African Local Government, Uganda.
- George Beaumont Wells Otway, Chief Pilot of Port of St. George, Grenada, Windward Islands.
- Visavalingam Peethamparam, Assistant Examination Secretary, Department of Education, Federation of Malaya.
- Penn Yuek Wing. For services to education in Hong Kong.
- Geoffrey Allan Phillips, Utilisation Officer, Forest Department, British Guiana.
- Joseph Liban Pinto, Assistant Administrator General, Zanzibar.
- Filimone Canimanu Raiqiscv Field Officer, Agricultural Department, Fiji.
- Major Henry Courtenay Rooks. For public services in Trinidad.
- Arthur James Rowan, Principal, Technical Institute, Aden.
- Kai, Madam Sasraku. For public services in the Gold Coast.
- James Scanlon, Principal, Thika Technical and Trades School, Kenya.
- Edgar Wynne Selby, Engineer, Mechanical Engineering Department, Office of the Crown Agents for Oversea Governments and Administrations.
- Norah Senior, Headmistress, Methodist Girls' High School, Bathurst, Gambia.
- Niranjan Singh, Interpreter, Civil District Court, Singapore.
- Pritam Singh, Office Superintendent, Postmaster-General's Office, East African Posts and Telecommunications Administration.
- Osmund Skinner. For public and social welfare services in Hong Kong.
- Jan Zygmunt Slominski, District Medical Officer, Carriacou, Windward Islands.
- Stella Gordon Smith. For social and welfare services in Trinidad.
- Edmund Nathaniel Oyekanmi Sodeinde, MD, BCh, Senior Medical Officer (Clinical), Federation of Nigeria.
- Fowell Buxton Dearlesmile Spencer, Chief Inspector, Public Works Department, Western Region, Nigeria.
- Conrad Evan Elwin Stevens, MB, BCh, Medical Superintendent, Cunningham Hospital, St. Kitts, Leeward Islands.
- Sonia Stromwall, Headquarters Officer, British Red Cross Society, British Honduras.
- Nicos Stylianakis, Chief Registrar, Supreme Court, Cyprus.
- Niereshwalia Manjunath Suvarna. For services to sport in Nyasaland.
- Fiatau Penitala Teo, Assistant Administrative Officer, Gilbert and Ellice Islands.
- Vahram Cricore Toundjian, Superintendent of Waterworks, Cyprus.
- The Venerable Archdeacon Albert Ernest Vollor, Rural Dean and Schools Supervisor, Africa Inland Mission, West Nile District, Uganda.
- Wadia Waifo, Chief Clerk, Resident's Office, Calabar, Eastern Region, Nigeria.
- Abator Jemima Williams. For services to the Girl Guide Movement in Sierra Leone.
- Robert Graham Wilson, District Commissioner, Fort Hall, Kenya.
- Wong Sing Khing. For public services in Sarawak.
- Amadu Wurie, Education Officer, Sierra Leone.

Honorary Members

- Chan Chong-Wen. For public services in Johore Bahru, Federation of Malaya.
- Tak bin Haji Daud, Assistant Research Officer, Department of Agriculture, Federation of Malaya.
- Wong Peng Soon. For services to sport in the Federation of Malaya.
- Yip Tai Loy, lately Chinese Affairs Officer, Perak, Federation of Malaya.
- Chik bin Mattin. For public services in the Federation of Malaya.
- Sheikh Salim bin Ali el-Mendhiri, Mudir of Wete and Piki, Pemba, Zanzibar.

=== Order of the Companions of Honour (CH) ===
- Edgar Algernon Robert, Viscount Cecil of Chelwood, QC. For public services.
- Colonel Sir John Lionel Kotelawala, KBE, Prime Minister of Ceylon.
- Arthur David Waley, CBE. For services to the study of Chinese literature.

=== British Empire Medal (BEM) ===
Military Division

Royal Navy

- Engine Room Artificer 2nd Class James Taylor Cuthill Anderson, TAD/126, Royal Naval Volunteer Reserve.
- Chief Petty Officer Herbert Isaac Richard Barnes, P/JX.127193.
- Petty Officer Airman Horace William Barnes, L/FX.670556.
- Chief Engine Room Artificer Philip Gordon Carter, C/MX.49497
- Sick Berth Chief Petty Officer Henry Frederick Chapman, C/MX.48179.
- Chief Wren Steward (O) Ruby Constance Adeline Dalley, 35693, Women's Royal Naval Service.
- Chief Aircraft Artificer Norman Day, DSM, L/FX.75062.
- Chief Shipwright George Edwards, D/MX.45715.
- Chief Petty Officer Frederick George Evason, C/JX.155313.
- Quartermaster Sergeant Joseph Farmery, Ply.X.1482, Royal Marines.
- Chief Electrical Artificer Arthur Ernest Ferris, DSM, D/M.38458.
- Chief Petty Officer Eric Andrew Field, DSM, P/JX.151907.
- Chief Petty Officer Telegraphist Douglas Rickard Hume, D/JX.140949.
- Chief Electrician Ernest Benjamin Jarvis, C/MX.844955.
- Quartermaster Sergeant James Frederick Henry Jones, Ply.X.1154, Royal Marines.
- Chief Petty Officer Aaron Kent, C/JX.141439.
- Chief Petty Officer Steward Joseph Nazareth, G/LX.24606.
- Quartermaster Sergeant Frederick Elam Newport, Ply.X.3046, Royal Marines.
- Petty Officer Osman bin Bakrie, L/JX.320, Malayan Royal Naval Volunteer Reserve.
- Chief Aircraft Artificer George Robert Pengelly, L/FX.670550.
- Chief Engine Room Artificer Leslie John Peter, D/MX.54972.
- Chief Engine Room Artificer Charles Phillips, P/MX.54550.
- Master-at-Arms Charles John Roberts, D/MX.102785.
- Chief Painter William John Ellis Roberts, P/MX.49346.
- Chief Petty Officer Cook (S) George Frederick Salter, P/MX.50585.
- Chief Petty Officer Francis Gordon Selby, DSM, P/JX.145558.
- Mechanician 1st Class Richard Arthur Smith, C/KX.154982.
- Chief Petty Officer Samuel Stanley, D/JX.137678.
- Chief Radio Electrician John Hughes Taylor, P/MX.857813.
- Chief Yeoman of Signals James Thomas, D/JX.135962.
- Stores Chief Petty Officer (V) Alfred Frederick Wales, C/MX.47532

Army

- NA/28433 Company-Sergeant-Major Louis Adokuru, The Nigeria Regiment, Royal West African Frontier Force.
- 780408 Battery-Quartermaster-Sergeant Leonard Walter Bones, Royal Regiment of Artillery, Territorial Army.
- 781603 Sergeant James William Bosomworth, Royal Regiment of Artillery.
- W/47726 Sergeant Marjorie Violet Briant, Women's Royal Army Corps.
- 20634 Corporal William Brock, The Royal Scots (The Royal Regiment), Territorial Army.
- 5494687 Colour-Sergeant Reginald George Bumpstead, The Highland Light Infantry (City of Glasgow Regiment).
- 1875065 Staff-Sergeant (acting) Horace Buswell, Corps of Royal Engineers.
- 22513645 Sergeant (acting) Cyril Herbert Clark, Corps of Royal Military Police.
- 7625837 Warrant Officer Class II (acting) George Oswald Curry, Royal Army Ordnance Corps.
- 21146949 Warrant Officer Class II (acting) Dhanbahadur Rana, 2nd King Edward VII's Own Gurkha Rifles.
- W/236768 Staff Sergeant Ida Dorothy Doddridge, Women's Royal Army Corps, Territorial Army.
- 14186292 Sergeant Roy Reginald Emerson, Royal Tank Regiment, Royal Armoured Corps.
- 14452896 Staff Sergeant (acting) Geoffrey Crawford Fagg, Corps of Royal Engineers.
- 7888881 Warrant Officer Class II (acting) James Fraser, MM, Royal Tank Regiment, Royal Armoured Corps.
- 529 Sergeant Edward Harold Harrison, Corps of Royal Engineers (Malta Section).
- 7601386 Staff-Sergeant William Havens, Corps of Royal Electrical and Mechanical Engineers.
- 19013353 Staff-Sergeant Thomas Hawnt, Royal Army Medical Corps.
- 19040331 Staff-Sergeant Edward John Hayward, Corps of Royal Engineers.
- 5042515 Sergeant James Bernard Hiney, The North Staffordshire Regiment (The Prince of Wales's).
- S/853893 Staff-Sergeant (now Warrant Officer Class II) Eric Hutchinson, Royal Army Service Corps.
- W/CA/272919 Corporal (acting) Stella Maria Johnson, Women's Royal Army Corps.
- 22041722 Sergeant (Artillery Clerk) Roy William Kinsley, Royal Regiment of Artillery.
- 7587721 Staff-Sergeant Dennis Tomlinson Low, Corps of Royal Electrical and Mechanical Engineers.
- 2615337 Colour-Sergeant Leslie William Mayhew, Grenadier Guards.
- 22292832 Sergeant Herbert Frederick Miskimmin, Royal Army Ordnance Corps, Territorial Army.
- 22531093 Sergeant (Cook) Charles Monaghan, Army Catering Corps, Territorial Army.
- GC.12582 Regimental-Sergeant-Major Gesuwendi Moshi, The Gold Coast Regiment, Royal West African Frontier Force.
- 22271588 Lance-Corporal Samuel Newton, The Manchester Regiment, Territorial Army.
- 7597120 Staff-Sergeant John William Oakley, Corps of Royal Electrical and Mechanical Engineers.
- 14259947 Sergeant Ronald Ernest Oliver, Royal Corps of Signals.
- 3390286 Staff-Sergeant Leonard Parker, Corps of Royal Electrical and Mechanical Engineers.
- 874649 Warrant Officer Class II (acting) Eric James Parry, Royal Regiment of Artillery.
- 21013328 Staff-Sergeant (acting) (now Sergeant (acting)) Joseph Christopher Perry, Royal Army Pay Corps.
- 794457 Sergeant (acting) William Henry Pickering, Royal Regiment of Artillery.
- 7888905 Staff-Sergeant Joseph Pitt, Royal Tank Regiment, Royal Armoured Corps.
- 22970893 Corporal William Prescott, Corps of Royal Engineers.
- 845502 Warrant Officer Class II (acting) Charles John Pring, Royal Regiment of Artillery.
- ER/1486822 Warrant Officer Class I (acting) Arthur Anthony Roberts, Royal Regiment of Artillery.
- 317212 Sergeant Ernest Scattergood, Corps of Royal Military Police.
- W/47533 Warrant Officer Class II (acting) Freda Olive Shooter, Women's Royal Army Corps.
- 22222314 Sergeant Herbert Lewis Smith, The Royal Berkshire Regiment (Princess Charlotte of Wales's), Territorial Army.
- T/85411 Warrant Officer Class II (acting) Fraser Souter, Royal Army Service Corps.
- 2926349 Colour-Sergeant George Stoddart, The Royal Scots Fusiliers.
- 6396625 Sergeant Leslie George Reims Suggitt, Army Catering Corps.
- 873188 Sergeant Henry Milner Thompson, Royal Regiment of Artillery, Territorial Army.
- 4028408 Sergeant James Herbert Tratt, Royal Regiment of Artillery, Territorial Army.
- 1043088 Squadron Quartermaster-Sergeant Harry Trill, Corps of Royal Engineers, Territorial Army.
- 22557151 Colour-Sergeant Sidney Alfred West, The King's Royal Rifle Corps, Territorial Army.
- 7350311 Staff-Sergeant Stanley Ewart Wilson, Royal Army Medical Corps, Territorial Army.
- 22296577 Sergeant William Frederick Worsdale, Royal Corps of Signals.

Royal Air Force

- 540223 Flight Sergeant Leslie Joseph Balcombe.
- 611294 Flight Sergeant (now Acting Warrant Officer) James Carlaw Bryce.
- 528215 Flight Sergeant Joseph Clint.
- 566552 Flight Sergeant Ronald James Francis Darvill.
- 514666 Flight Sergeant (now Acting Warrant Officer) Frederick Ellerby.
- 535547 Flight Sergeant (now Acting Warrant Officer) Thomas Edward Frazer.
- 524767 Flight Sergeant John Tasker Passenger Frith.
- 525626 Flight Sergeant Ivor William Gosling.
- 563774 Flight Sergeant Thomas Lawrence Hartas.
- 1150743 Flight Sergeant William Henry Horton.
- 917724 Flight Sergeant (now Acting Warrant Officer) William Charles Johnson.
- 532628 Flight Sergeant Edward Horatio Bowen Jones.
- 566473 Flight Sergeant Charles Byron Hogg McNiven.
- 909139 Flight Sergeant Edmond John Nightingale.
- 527107 Flight Sergeant Douglas Jack Paling.
- 972607 Flight Sergeant Samuel Flatten.
- 2687030 Flight Sergeant Walter Stanley Smith, Royal Auxiliary Air Force.
- 562937 Flight Sergeant (now Acting Warrant Officer) Cyril Arthur Lionel Williams.
- 573566 Chief Technician Eric Thomas Robinson.
- 629905 Chief Technician Albert Edgar Taylor.
- 626671 Acting Right Sergeant Frederick George Churchill.
- 1278943 Acting Flight Sergeant Stanley George Harris.
- 572888 Acting Flight Sergeant John William Hughes.
- 451870 Acting Flight Sergeant Helga Mary Neilson, Women's Royal Air Force.
- 1152516 Acting Flight Sergeant Clifford Ernest Valentine.
- 542482 Acting Flight Sergeant John Wensley.
- 1173758 Acting Flight Sergeant (now Pilot Officer) Percy Charles George Woolston.
- 644102 Sergeant Jeffrey William Barber.
- 795776 Sergeant Nicholas Camilleri, Royal Air Force, Malta.
- 578291 Sergeant Robert Anthony Cartmell.
- 4003391 Sergeant Maurice William Victor Hart.
- 4021300 Sergeant Gordon Charles Hellier.
- 516484 Sergeant Samuel Mark Lamb.
- 542639 Sergeant Basil Reginald Ellis Moore.
- 1900616 Sergeant Michael Joseph Ryan.
- 1809435 Sergeant Jim Vincent.
- 2133729 Sergeant Audrey Constance Whittaker, Women's Royal Air Force.
- 1230904 Senior Technician Albert James Ellis.
- 574526 Acting Sergeant John Francis Bartlett.
- 1904002 Acting Sergeant Patrick Michael Kearney.
- 4009654 Acting Sergeant James Edward McLoughlin.
- 3075585 Acting Sergeant James Frederick Miller.
- 1460139 Acting Sergeant Percy MacDonald Lewis-Rozier.
- 3504417 Corporal Ernest Edward Southwick.
- 926321 Acting Corporal Charles William Capel.

Civil Division

- Harry William Aggar, School Staff Instructor, Allhallows School, Rousdon, Devon.
- Albert Ainsworth, Storekeeper, Morley District, North Eastern Gas Board. (Morley, Nr. Leeds.)
- William Allison, Foreman Gasfitter, Ayr District, Scottish Gas Board. (Ayr.)
- James William Anderson, Engine Driver, RAF Station Netherbutton, Orkney Islands.
- Sarah Andrews, Honorary Collector, Victor Terrace Savings Group, Heaton, Bradford.
- Donald Frederick William Archer, Radio Operator (Supervisor), Royal Air Force, Cheadle, Staffs.
- Percival William Bolt Bagnell, Station Officer, Northamptonshire Fire Brigade. (Northampton.)
- George Banks, Station Officer, Cheshire Fire Brigade. (Congleton.)
- Harold Ernest Barber, Depot Manager, House Coal Distribution (Emergency) Scheme, Benfleet, Canvey Island. (Leigh-on-Sea, Essex.)
- Norman Baxter, Electrical Tester, Metropolitan Vickers Electrical Co. Ltd. (Manchester.)
- Edgar Beniston, Deputy, New Lount Colliery, East Midlands Division, National Coal Board. (Leicester.)
- Edward Bennett, Sub-Station Attendant, London Electricity Board. (Kilburn, N.W.6.)
- George Bennett, Motor Driver, North Thames Gas Board. (Northolt, Middlesex.)
- Roy Bentley, Length Ganger, Prestbury, London Midland Region, British Railways. (Macclesfield.)
- John Berry, Underground Mineworker, New Monckton 1, 2 and 5 Colliery, North Eastern Division, National Coal Board. (Royston.)
- Frank Bone, Yard Foreman, Crewe Works, North Western Gas Board. (Crewe.)
- Cyril Brook, Electrical Fitter, Yorkshire Electricity Board. (Holmfirth.)
- Hilda Broomfield, Commandant, County of London Detachment, British Red Cross. Society. (East Dulwich, S.E.22.)
- Michael James Brown, Technician Class I, Portsmouth Telephone Area, Southsea. (Portsmouth.)
- Harry Bryan, Underground Pumpsman, Morton Colliery, East Midlands Division, National Coal Board. (Stonebroom, Derbyshire.)
- Anthony Burke, Safety Officer, Rising Sun Colliery, Northern (Northumberland & Cumberland) Division, National Coal Board. (Wallsend-upon-Tyne.)
- Norah Byatt, Joint Deputy County Borough Organiser, Bradford, Women's Voluntary Services.
- John Calcott, Chief Air Raid Warden, Edinburgh.
- Donald Clarke, Leading Steam Turbine Driver, East Midlands Division, Central Electricity Authority. (Derby.)
- Horace Cole, Toolroom Foreman, Joseph Lucas (Batteries) Ltd. (Birmingham.)
- Samuel Clements Colhoun, Sub-District Commandant, Ulster Special Constabulary. (Sixmilecross, Co. Tyrone.)
- James Combe, Fitter, South of Scotland Electricity Board. (Musselburgh.)
- Philip Condon, Office Keeper, Board of Inland Revenue. (Islington, N.I.)
- Michael Cook, Repairer, Nellie Colliery, Scottish Division, National Coal Board. (Fife.)
- Herbert Henry Corneby, Principal Paper-keeper, Board of Trade. (South Harrow.)
- Charles Henry James Gotten, Shop Foreman, No. 47 Maintenance Unit, RAF Hawarden. (Shotton, Nr. Chester.)
- George Coull, lately Fisherman, Aberdeen.
- Cecil Clarence Cox, Supervising Engineer, Grade III, Rampton Hospital, Ministry of Works. (Retford.)
- John Brandon Crowley, Foreman, Harbens Ltd. (Golborrie, Lancashire.)
- William Cullington, Leading Chargehand, Grimsby Ice Co. Ltd. (Cleethorpes.)
- Lindsay Cutler, Staff Officer, Surrey Special Constabulary. (Godalming, Surrey.)
- Albert Edward Davies, Postman, East Dulwich Sub District Office, London.
- John Davies, JP, lately Checkweigher, East Colliery, Glamorganshire. (Gwaun-cae-Gurwen.)
- Morgan Tudor Davies, Postal and Telegraph Officer, Head Post Office, Swansea.
- Edwin Jubilee Dawe, Clerk of Works, Royal Air Force Uxbridge. (Greenford.)
- Harold John Dixon, Foreman, Civil Reserve Oil Installation (Stourport), Regent Oil Co. Ltd. (Stourport-on-Severn.)
- Thomas Richard Dorricot, Foreman of Works, HM Borstal Institution, Rochester, Kent.
- William Arthur Johnston Dunn, Travelling Superintendent Gardener, North-West European District, Imperial War Graves Commission.
- Sylvia, Lady Dyson, Centre Organiser, Windsor, Women's Voluntary Services.
- Chrissie Hilda Edds, Forewoman, British Museum Bindery, HM Stationery Office. (Holborn, W.C.1.)
- Ernest Edwards, Foreman Linesman, North West, Merseyside & North Wales Division, Central Electricity Authority. (Cheadle, Cheshire.)
- Hannah Elliott, Nursing Assistant, Prudhoe and Monkton Hospital, Newcastle-on-Tyne.
- Iris Mary Emmett, Honorary Collector, Street Savings Group, Liverpool.
- Llewelyn Evans, Head Medical Room Attendant, Nook Colliery, North Western Division, National Coal Board. (Manchester.)
- Reginald Gerald Fowles, Supervisor, Leatherhead Detachment, Royal Hospital Chelsea.
- Dorothy Garrity, Area Organiser, Blyth, Saxmundham and Leiston, East Suffolk, Women's Voluntary Services.
- William Given, Laboratory Mechanic, Torpedo Experimental Establishment, Admiralty, Greenock. (Gourock.)
- Reginald Rayfield Goatham, Works Foreman, Gillingham Works, South Eastern Gas Board.
- Albert Henry Gorst, Supernumerary Shift Manager, Tate & Lyle Ltd. (Ilford, Essex.)
- Reginald Arthur Grant, Auxiliary Plant Attendant, Midlands Division, Central Electricity Authority. (Birmingham.)
- Charles Alfred Greig, Supervisory Foreman, Class 3, Slough Goods, Western Region, British Railways. (North Kensington, W.10.)
- Samuel Grierson, Senior Overman, Binley Colliery, West Midlands Division, National Coal Board. (Coventry.)
- John George Stanley Harker, Foreman and Storekeeper (Machinery), Durham Agricultural Executive Committee. (Durham.)
- Leslie Albert Harper, Grainer, Grade B II, Ordnance Survey Department. (Southampton.)
- Henry Harrison, Boatswain, MV Neaera, Shell Tankers Ltd. (North Shields.)
- William John Harrison, Fitter, Crewe Motive Power Depot, London Midland Region, British Railways.
- Mary Hartley, Member, Civil Defence Corps, Oldham.
- William Haskett, Salvage Worker, Washington "F" Colliery, Durham Division, National Coal Board. (Washington, County Durham.)
- Miriam May Hawkins, Honorary Collector, Street Savings Groups, Luton.
- Harold Heaton, Machine Setter "A", Royal Ordnance Factory, Wigan.
- William Henderson, Haulage Engineman, Thornley Colliery, Durham Division, National Coal Board. (Thornley, County Durham.)
- Alfred Herbert John Hindry, Canteen Manager, N.A.A.F.I., HMS St. Vincent, Gosport.
- Harry Howell, DCM, MM, Office Keeper, Class I, Home Office. (East Dulwich, S.E.22.)
- Christopher Hudson, JP, Underground Contract Bye-worker, Prince of Wales Colliery, North Eastern Division, National Coal Board. (Pontefract.)
- Constance Hunt, Home Help, Wallasey.
- Walter Jackson, Surface Pumpsman, Abercynon Colliery, South Western Division, National Coal Board.
- William Manson Jardine, Technical Officer, Glasgow Telephone Area, Glasgow.
- Robert John Jemison, Leading Draughtsman, Armament Research & Development Establishment, Ministry of Supply. (Cuffley, Hertfordshire.)
- John Albert Johnson, Office Keeper, Exchequer and Audit Department. (Camberwell, S.E.5.)
- Robert Johnston, Commandant, Dunfermline British Railways Section, St. Andrew's Ambulance Corps.
- Ebenezer Jones, Machinery Depot Foreman, Glamorgan Agricultural Executive Committee.
- Ewart William Jones, Underground Switchboard Operator, Elliot (East) Colliery, South Western Division, National Coal Board. (New Tredegar.)
- Griffith Robert Jones, Chief Inspector (Travelling) (Postal), Post Office Headquarters, Wales and Border Counties. (Llanelly.)
- Hubert William Jones, Head Forester, Delamere Forest, Cheshire.
- Mohamed Kassim bin Mahat, Sub-Inspector, Royal Air Force Auxiliary Police, Changi, Far East Air Force.
- William Douglas Keen, Preventive Officer, Board of Customs and Excise, Aughnacloy, County Tyrone.
- John Albert Kerman, Detective Inspector, Carlisle City Police Force.
- Thomas Knox, Chargehand, R. & H. Green & Silley Weir Ltd. (Marylebone, N.W.8.)
- Edward Vincent Lane, Assistant Inspector (Postal), Northern District Post Office, London. (Highbury, N.5.)
- William Lea, lately Foreman Craftsman, British Museum. (Barnsbury, N.1.)
- Charles Henry Leadbeater, Research and Experimental Mechanic (Special) Fitter, Atomic Weapons Research Establishment, Aldermaston. (Reading.)
- George William Lee, Overman, Leasingthorne Colliery, Durham Division, National Coal Board. (Bishop Auckland.)
- John Lewis, Assistant Mill Foreman, Gorse Galvanising Co. Ltd. (Llanelly.)
- John James Liddle, Chargeman Fitter, North Eastern Electricity Board. (Newcastle upon Tyne.)
- Lawrence Mutimer Lockwood, Instructor, Government Training Centre, Ministry of Labour and National Service. (Thornton Heath, Surrey.)
- Sidney Loveless, JP, Faceworker, Gigfield Colliery, North Western Division, National Coal Board. (Atherton.)
- John Lucas, Engineer and Manager, Llanberis Gas and Water Undertaking, Wales Gas Board.
- Reginald Russell Lusted, Research and Experimental Mechanic, Royal Aircraft Establishment, Ministry of Supply. (Farnborough.)
- Roy Lyons, Overman, Morrison Busty Colliery, Durham Division, National Coal Board. (Stanley.)
- John McClintock, Honorary Collector, Works Savings Group, Donalong Creamery, Bready, Strabane, County Tyrone.
- Herbert McGlory, Engine-room Storekeeper, SS Mataroa, Shaw Saville & Albion Co. Ltd. (Liverpool.)
- Arthur McGown, Foreman of Plumbers, Harland & Wolff Ltd. (Southampton.)
- John William McIvor, Electrician, Imperial Chemical Industries Ltd, Billingham Division. (Middlesbrough.)
- Alexander McLeod, Motor Transport Fitter, Wick Airport, Caithness.
- John McMillan, Carpenter and Millwright, Irish Tapestry Co. Ltd., Newtownards, County Down.
- Philip John McWilliam, lately Chief Inspector (Postal), Head Post Office, Liverpool.
- William James Maguire, Chief Air Raid Warden, Southern District, Glasgow.
- Cyril George Marsh, Chief Sub-Commander, Birmingham City Special Constabulary.
- Ethel Constance Martindale, Honorary Collector, Craybrooke Road Savings Group, Sidcup, Kent.
- Nicholas Dimitry Matandos, lately Foreman of Trades, War Office, Tel El Kebir.
- Martha Mather, Weaver, Vantona Textiles Ltd. (Bolton.)
- William Maxwell, Chief Occupational Supervisor, Hillington Industrial Rehabilitation Unit, Ministry of Labour and National Service. (Glasgow.)
- Thomas Ramsey Milburn, Mess Caterer, 105 Corps Engineer Regiment (T.A.), War Office. (Gateshead.)
- Thirsa Florence Miller, Honorary Collector, Street Savings Group, Aylesbury.
- Charles Moult, Senior Engine Erector, Crossley Premier Engines Ltd. (Stapleford.)
- Edith Violet Moutrie, Commandant, Dorset Detachment, British Red Cross Society. (Swanage.)
- Patrick Murphy, Principal Keeper, St. Mary's Island Lighthouse, Corporation of Trinity House.
- William Henry Newns, Chargehand Fitter, Royal Electrical and Mechanical Engineers Workshop, War Office. (Oxford.)
- Annie Nicholson, Chief Supervisor, (F) (Telephones), Head Post Office, Sheffield.
- Lilian May Victoria Ore, Leading Tracer, HM Underwater Countermeasures and Weapons Establishment, Portsmouth.
- Morgan Osborne, Haulage Hand, Lucy No. 4 Colliery, South Western Division, National Coal Board, (Merthyr.)
- Herbert Martin Palmer, Workshop Manager, Fine Arts Department, British Council. (West Kensington, W.14.)
- George Harold Payne, Overseer (Redundant) (Telegraphs), Head Post Office, Leeds.
- Alfred Benjamin Pearce, General Works Foreman, Schermuly Pistol Rocket Apparatus Ltd. (Bletchworth, Surrey.)
- Edward John Pedder, JP, Sub-Postmaster, Post Office, Lynmouth, Devon.
- Frank John Pehl, Office Keeper, Grade II, Ministry of Pensions and National Insurance. (Kingsbury, N.W.9.)
- Amy Philipson, Honorary Collector, Belvoir Drive Savings Group, Leicester.
- William George Lander Pillidge, Chargeman of Engine Fitters, Admiralty, Devonport. (Plymouth.)
- Frederick George Price, Running Foreman, Guildford, Southern Region, British Railways.
- Ernest Priest, Chief Inspector (Postal), Head Post Office, Sheffield.
- Kathleen Grace Rains, Head Fur Machinist, Kent & Francis. (Hampstead, N.W.3.)
- Thomas Harold Reeson, General Foreman, Wm. Wright & Son (Lincoln) Ltd. (Lincoln.)
- John William Riggall, lately Clerk of Works to the Royal Agricultural Society of England. (Chaddesdon, Near Derby.)
- William Gibson Third Robertson, Principal Officer, HM Prison Peterhead.
- William Stables Russell, Inspector (Engineering), Post Office Telephones, Aberdeen.
- George Edward Sandland, Chief Warden, Civil Defence Corps (Bexley Sub-Division), Kent.
- Werner Thomas Jacob Berges Sauer, Technical Officer, Engineer-in-Chief s Office, General Post Office. (Croydon.)
- Reggie James Saunders, Chargeman Fitter, Royal Naval Air Station Ford. (Littlehampton.)
- Walter Scott, Warden, Territorial Army Centre, Nottingham.
- William George Scowen, Fitter's Mate, South Eastern Division, Central Electricity Authority. (Folkestone.)
- Katherine Searle, Member, Edinburgh Centre Staff, Women's Voluntary Services.
- Frank Richard Sharp, Engineering Technical Grade III, Proof and Experimental Establishment, Ministry of Supply. (Bexleyheath, Kent.)
- Benjamin Henry Shenton, Detective-Sergeant, Jersey Paid Police Force.
- Harry Smith, Ripper, Rockingham Colliery, North Eastern Division, National Coal Board. (Barnsley.)
- John Wilson Stephenson, Foreman, Barry Ostlere & Shepherd Ltd. (Kirkcaldy.)
- John Thomas George Steptoe, Inspector of Workpeople, Admiralty Boom Defence Depot, Gosport.
- Jean Lyon Stewart, Chief Inspector, Lancashire County Constabulary. (Preston.)
- Edward James Stoter, Chief Attendant, Lido, Hyde Park, Ministry of Works. (Westbourne Grove, W.2.)
- Lionel Frank Stovin, Chargehand Fitter, J. S. Doig Ltd. (Grimsby.)
- Rex Stracey, Ship Plater, Mercantile Dry Dock Co. Ltd. (Jarrow.)
- William Andrew Sutherland, Boatswain, SS Rora Head, North of Scotland, Orkney & Shetland Steam Navigation Company Ltd. (Edinburgh.)
- Bertram Henry Sutton, Storage Operative, Ministry of Supply. (Cinderford)
- Robert Lockhart Walker Swann, Deputy Divisional Commandant, Special Constabulary, City Police, Glasgow.
- Archdale Arthur Frederick Tatman, Chargehand, Enfield Cables Ltd. (Enfield.)
- James Teasdale, Chief Storekeeper (Catering), SS Queen Mary, Cunard Steamship Company Ltd. (Altrincham, Cheshire.)
- Albert Henry Thorne, Labourer, Ministry of Works. (Vauxhall, S.E.11.)
- Kathleen Alice Timmins, Head Forewoman, Portals Ltd. (Basingstoke.)
- Thomas Jackson Tindall, Civilian Warrant Officer, No. 148 (Barnsley) Squadron, Air Training Corps. (Barnsley.)
- Herbert Edgar Truscott, Supervising Recorder, Admiralty. (Cardiff.)
- Ethel Turnage, Chief Supervisor (F) (Telephones), Baling Telephone Exchange. (Holborn, W.C.1.)
- Maud Unwin, Fettler, Dewrance & Co. Ltd. (Herne Hill, S.E.24.)
- Dorothy Vaughan, Joint Centre Organiser, Aberystwyth, Women's Voluntary Services.
- Paul Vella, Principal Workshop Foreman, War Office, Malta.
- Millist Harold Vincent, Technical Grade II, Empire Test Pilots' School, Royal Aircraft Establishment, Ministry of Supply. (Fleet.)
- John Henry Walker, Unit Adjuster, London Division, Central Electricity Authority. (Worcester Park, Surrey.)
- Arthur George Walpole, Chief Warder and Chief Fireman, Victoria and Albert Museum. (South Kensington, S.W.7.)
- Arthur Robert Warren, Assistant Works Engineer, Lincoln Undertaking, East Midlands Gas Board.
- Bernard Charles George Watson, Farm Bailiff, Ministry of Agriculture, Fisheries and Food Experimental Farm, Norfolk.
- John Henry Westley, Inspector (Postal), Head Post Office, Walsall, Staffordshire.
- Marmaduke Wetherell, Chief Observer, Post N.3, Whitburn, No. 23 Group, Royal Observer Corps. (South Shields.)
- Lionel Frederick White, Mechanic Examiner, Inspectorate of Armaments, Ministry of Supply. (Shooters Hill, S.E.18.)
- Doris Williams, lately Senior Chief Supervisor (F) (Telephones), Head Post Office, Manchester. (Worthing.)
- Robert Williams, Foreman Shipwright, Consolidated Fisheries Ltd. (Swansea.)
- Walter Willson, Foreman, Lincolnshire River Board. (Mablethorpe.)
- Andrew Cowie Wilson, Member, Coast Life Saving Corps and Volunteer-in-Charge, St. Abbs. L.S.A. Company, Berwickshire.
- Edgar Charles Wilson, Assistant Superintendent (Counter & Writing), Paddington District Post Office. (Battersea, S.W.11.)
- James Wilson, Artificer, National Physical Laboratory, Department of Scientific and Industrial Research. (Twickenham, Middlesex.)
- Albert Archibald Wood, Station Master, Waterloo (Underground), London Transport Executive, British Transport Commission. (Tooting, S.W.17.)
- William Henry Wood, Able Seaman, SS Orion, Orient Steam Navigation Company Ltd. (Whitstable.)
- Minnie Wootten, Honorary Collector, Charmouth Road Savings Group, Bath.
- Margaret Wykes, Member, Leicestershire County Staff, Women's Voluntary Services. (Leicester.)
- Edward Yates, Foreman Electrician, Beyer, Peacock & Company Ltd. (Manchester.)

Tasmania

- James Stanley Forward, Welfare Worker, Launceston, Tasmania.

Basutoland

- Duty Lekena, Development Officer, Basutoland.

Overseas Territories

- Jonah Boyan, Technical Assistant, Forestry Department, British Guiana.
- Edward Eyre Melville, Chief Ranger, Rupununi, British Guiana.
- Collett Fitzgerald Gill, Sergeant, British Honduras Police Force.
- Avril Mejia, Public Health Nurse, Corozal, British Honduras.
- Charles Usher, Artisan, Corozal Sugar Factory, British Honduras.
- Hassan Mulla Houssein Kahya, Mukhtar of the Turkish Quarter of Episkopi, Cyprus.
- Ralph Anthony Lenton, Wireless Operator, Falkland Islands Dependencies Survey.
- John Kodzo de Souza, Foreman, Public Works Department, Gold Coast.
- Henry Binns, Assistant, Approved Schools, Prisons Department, Kenya.
- Althea Scatliffe, lately Assistant Teacher, British Virgin Islands, Leeward Islands.
- Abooravam Arokiasamy, Senior Assistant, Telecommunications Department, Ipoh, Federation of Malaya.
- Preme Singh Gill, Police Clerk and Interpreter, Federal Police Depot, Federation of Malaya.
- Inche Abdul Kadir bin Abdullah, Inspector of Malay Schools, Kelantan, Federation of Malaya.
- Khoo Kim Swee, Telegraph Master, Telecommunications Department, Penang, Federation of Malaya.
- Muttoo s/o Kayamboo, Catchment Inspector, Municipal Water Department, Penang, Federation of Malaya.
- Ong Chooi Eng, Clerk, Public Works Department, Penang, Federation of Malaya.
- Henry Martin Peintkowsky, Senior Overseer of Works, Municipal Engineer's Department, Penang, Federation of Malaya.
- Soh Poh Wor, Police Clerk and Interpreter, Perak, Federation of Malaya.
- Jean Elvares Philogene. For public services in Mauritius.
- Francis Adebiyi Lewis, Senior Staff Nurse (Mental), Medical Department, Western Region, Nigeria.
- Ayodele Agnes Claris Henrietta Lew-Wray, Health Visitor, Grade I, Sierra Leone.
- Ahmed Sheikh Mohamed, Forest Assistant, Somaliland.
- Abdullah Elmi, Sergeant Major, Protectorate Tribal Police, Somaliland.
- Mohamed Bagi, Chief Warder, Prisons Service, Uganda.
- Charles Alexander, Line Chief, Electricity Department, Grenada, Windward Islands.
- Everest Alexis, Pipe-fitter Contractor, Public Works Department, Grenada, Windward Islands.
- James Henry Leon Banfield, Chief Telephone Assistant, St. George, Grenada, Windward Islands.
- Osmund Comissiong, Waterworks Keeper, Grenada, Windward Islands.
- Michael Daniels, Junior Roads Officer, Public Works Department, Grenada, Windward Islands.
- Willard Duncan, Truck Driver, Public Works Department, Grenada, Windward Islands.
- Reynold Francis, Assistant Waterworks Keeper, Grenada, Windward Islands.
- Leaetta Hall, District Nurse, Carriacou, Grenada, Windward Islands.
- Rudolph Erastus Noel, Head Teacher, Hillsborough Government School, Carriacou, Grenada, Windward Islands.
- Ramazan bin Feruzi, Driver, Public Works Department, Zanzibar.

=== Royal Victorian Medal (RVM) ===
In Silver

- George Arnold.
- Catherine Brookes.
- John Ross Campbell.
- Police Constable Reginald Arthur Cox, Metropolitan Police.
- William Walter Fletcher.
- Police Constable Harold Bell Greenwell, Metropolitan Police.
- Anthony Seaman Hanslip.
- Arthur Frederick Mitchell.
- Samuel Roe.
- Wallis Walter Searle.
- George Sheret.
- Petty Officer William Clifford Weaver, P/J 114892.
- 370370 Sergeant Joseph Richard Whitehead, Royal Air Force.
- Sidney Ernest Woolley.

=== Royal Red Cross (RRC) ===
- Lieutenant-Colonel (temporary) Mary Adelaide Josephine Condon (206083), Queen Alexandra's Royal Army Nursing Corps.
- Major Evelyn Marguerite Turner, MBE, (206486), Queen Alexandra's Royal Army Nursing Corps.

==== Associate of the Royal Red Cross (ARRC) ====
- Mabel Ann Griffiths, Superintending Sister, Queen Alexandra's Royal Naval Nursing Service.
- Marion Mann, Superintending Sister, Queen Alexandra's Royal Naval Nursing Service.
- Major Catherine Fisher (215365), Queen Alexandra's Royal Army Nursing Corps.
- Squadron Officer Eileen Cashel Cross (405166), Princess Mary's Royal Air Force Nursing Service.
- Squadron Officer Mary Taylor Russell (405377), Princess Mary's Royal Air Force Nursing Service.

=== Air Force Cross (AFC) ===
Royal Air Force

Wing Commanders

- Wilfred Jasper Burnett, DSO, DFC, (40076).
- George Binmore Johns, DSO, DFC, (45543).
- John Roy Hugh Merifield, DSO, DFC, (74337).

Squadron Leaders

- Geoffrey Arthur Catling (55052).
- Henry James Cobb, DSO, DFC, (143083).
- Jack Thompson Haughton (55036).
- Roy Emile Lelong, DFC, (59129).
- Aleksander Maisner (500062).
- Peter Gordon Marman (183953).
- Thomas Francis Neil, DFC, (79168).
- David John Gibson Norton (134037).
- Gordon James Storey (155051).
- James Haswell Walton (155112).
- Stanislaw Wandzilak, DFC, (500039).

Flight Lieutenants

- Peter Alexander Clarke, DFC, (42193).
- Vivian Charles Hester (137135).
- Eric Alexander Knighton (201854).
- František Masařík, MBE, (120196).
- Ian Reginald Ponsford, DFC, (135689), Royal Auxiliary Air Force.
- John Rees (54926).
- John Wood Sutherland (1573552).
- Jeffery John Webster (124563).
- Frederick John Wheeler, DFC, (145669).

Flying Officers

- Basil Walter Dodd (3507986).
- John Stewart Duncan (579850).

==== Bar to Air Force Cross ====
- Acting Wing Commander Kenneth Charles Giddings, OBE, DFC, AFC, (113414).
- Squadron Leader John Gascon Claridge, DFC, AFC, (59401).

==== Second Bar to Air Force Cross ====
- Wing Commander Michael Dillon Lyne, AFC, (33431).
- Squadron Leader Peter Donald Thorne, AFC, (125469).

=== Air Force Medal (AFM) ===
Royal Air Force

Flight Sergeants

- 1805114 Robert George Harrington.
- 1537764 Paul Harper.
- 1578141 Alan Maddison.
- 1566320 Alexander Naismith.
- 787166 Jaroslav Nýč.

Acting Flight Sergeant

- 1011420 Harold Wood.

Sergeants

- 1806453 Alan George Bourne.
- 630188 Alfred Bernard Cass.
- 1893229 Patrick Billy Hawker.
- 4070115 Victor Graham Holland.

=== Queen's Commendation for Valuable Service in the Air ===
United Kingdom

- Squadron Leader John Stewart Fifield, DFC, AFC, Test Pilot, Martin Baker Aircraft Co. Ltd.
- Captain Ronald Leslie Gellett, Aircraft Captain, British Overseas Airways Corporation.
- Captain Frank Ormonroyd, DFM, Captain of Aircraft, Requirements and Operating Procedures, British European Airways.
- Captain Richmond Fothergill Robinson, DFC, Senior Captain, Second Class, British European Airways.

Overseas Territories

- Philip Gerald Archer, lately Assistant District Commandant, Kenya Police Reserve Air Wing.
- Captain John Dall, Pilot, West African Airways Corporation.
- Michael O'Donovan, Flight Production Manager, Central African Airways Corporation.
- Robert Greyes Pakenham-Walsh, District Commandant, Kenya Police Reserve Air Wing.

Royal Air Force

Wing Commanders

- Ronald Albert Jell, DFC, (64283).
- Peter Gerald Hugh Matthews, DFC, (40247).
- Charles Leopold Walker Stewart, DSO, AFC, (40646).

Acting Wing Commander

- Robert Harold George Weighill, DFC, (124193).

Squadron Leaders

- Edgar Evans (124786).
- Raymond John Hopkins, DSO, (129481).
- Blaise Petherbridge Mugford (128917).
- Reginald Ernest Tickner (159062).

Flight Lieutenants

- James Wilfred Adams (57046).
- David William Edward Allum, DFC, (175918).
- John Handley Appleton (53931).
- Daniel Wilhelm Barnard (59460).
- James Godfrey Baxter (152597), Royal Auxiliary Air Force.
- Jack Willson Beale (161764).
- Harry Birch (1215650).
- Ronald Clifford Bridges (58021).
- Francis Henry Irving Cattle (55475).
- Ronald Charles Chapman, DFC, (144019).
- John Lawrence William Dunn (59514).
- William Gordon Gray (143994).
- Charles Richard Keeley (197205).
- Ronald Leah Kerr (177034).
- Denis Arthur Hubert Mortimer (3001059).
- Harold Douglas Moseley (59635).
- Gordon Richard Price, DFM, (59384).
- Norman Maxwell Shorter (196954).
- Edwin Frederick Smeeth (203451).
- Richard Ernest Wilmot Smerdon (147131).
- Alfred George Smith (200825), (deceased).
- Donald Edgar Vickers (4030411).
- James Ian Toler Williamson (576995).
- Robert Ian Young (3012399).

Flying Officer

- David Hurley (2502532).

Master Signallers

- Alexander Moore Brown (547669).
- Isaac Christmas Webb, BEM, (577783).

Flight Sergeants

- 576834 Ian Bruce Black.
- 3050862 William Alwyn Copley.
- 3051193 George William Edward Foster.

Corporal

- 4024456 George McMillian Young.

=== Queen's Police Medal (QPM) ===
England and Wales

- Lieutenant-Colonel Arthur Fairfax Senior, OBE, Chief Constable, East Suffolk County Constabulary.
- Charles Frederick Jelliff, Chief Constable, Great Yarmouth Borough Police Force.
- Henry Garth, OBE, Chief Constable, Preston Borough Police Force.
- George Henry Durnell, Assistant Chief Constable, Cheshire County Constabulary.
- William Charles Goodrich, Superintendent (Grade 1), Metropolitan Police.
- John Norman Smale, Detective Superintendent (Grade 1), Metropolitan Police.
- Frank Elmes, Superintendent, Dorset Constabulary.
- Cecil Edwin Gale, DCM, Superintendent, Wiltshire County Constabulary.
- William Ross, Superintendent, Cumberland and Westmorland Constabulary.
- Victor Ernest Stanley, Superintendent, Hampshire County Constabulary.
- Reginald Higham, Detective Superintendent, Bolton Borough Police Force.
- Harold Jack Postel Harris, Superintendent (Grade II), Metropolitan Police.

Scotland

- Hamilton Millar, Superintendent, Edinburgh City Police Force.

Northern Ireland

- Thomas David Sproule, Head Constable, Royal Ulster Constabulary.

Australia

- John James Flint, Detective Superintendent 2nd Class, New South Wales Police Force.
- William Henry Johnson, Superintendent 3rd Class, New South Wales Police Force.
- Walter Alfred Leslie Crimston, Superintendent, 3rd Class, New South Wales Police Force.
- Athol Ernest Blackwell, Superintendent, 3rd Class, New South Wales Police Force.
- Berty Bernard Parker, Inspector, 1st Class, New South Wales Police Force.
- Esmond Wheeler Freeman, Inspector, 1st Class, New South Wales Police Force.
- William Leslie Jefferson, Inspector, 2nd Class, New South Wales Police Force.

Southern Rhodesia

- Lieutenant-Colonel Charles William Howe Thatcher, Assistant Commissioner of the British South Africa Police.

Overseas Territories

- Walter Ronald Weber, Acting Deputy Commissioner of Police, British Guiana.
- Leonard Chapman, Senior Superintendent of Police, Gold Coast.
- Edward Tyrer, Assistant Commissioner of Police, Hong Kong.
- John Hedley Hindmarsh, Assistant Commissioner of Police, Federation of Malaya.
- Leslie George Valpy, Assistant Commissioner of Police, Federation of Malaya.
- Robert Cecil Conroy Jarrett, BEM, Deputy Commissioner of Police, Federation of Nigeria.
- Desmond Victor Noott, Senior Superintendent of Police, Sierra Leone.

=== Queen's Fire Services Medal (QFSM) ===
England and Wales

- Willoughby Mervyn Hammett Drake, MBE, Chief Officer, Shropshire Fire Brigade.
- John Heap, Chief Officer, Bury Fire Brigade.
- Arnold George Field, Divisional Officer, Birmingham Fire Brigade.
- Henry Alfred Stanislas, Divisional Officer (Deputy Chief Officer), Brighton Fire Brigade.

Scotland

- Alexander Hodge Nisbet, GM, OBE, Firemaster, Lanarkshire Area Fire Brigade.

=== Colonial Police Medal (CPM) ===
Southern Rhodesia

- Major Douglas Myers Batty, British South Africa Police.
- Captain John Robert Elliott, British South Africa Police.
- Captain Roland Howard Grimes, British South Africa Police.
- John Bellamy Hall, Detective Inspector, British South Africa Police.
- Major George McLean Harvey, British South Africa Police.
- Mbayiwa, Station Sergeant, British South Africa Police.
- Ronald Edwin John Trevor Reed, Chief Inspector, British South Africa Police.
- Tazwinzwa, Detective First Class Sergeant, British South Africa Police.
- Captain John Thomas Thompson, British South Africa Police.
- Captain Hubert Charles Wright, British South Africa Police.

Basutoland

- Sofonia Mokete Seboko, Senior Inspector, Basutoland Mounted Police.

Overseas Territories

- Abdullah bin Haji Hassan Sergeant Major, Federation of Malaya Police Force.
- Mat Akib bin Ahmad, Sergeant, Special Constabulary, Federation of Malaya.
- Mohamed Ali, Sergeant, Tanganyika Police Force.
- Mohamed Ali bin Ipet, Sergeant, Federation of Malaya Police Force.
- Thomas Harold Allen, Superintendent, Singapore Police Force.
- Sam Amah, Chief Inspector, Nigeria Police Force.
- George Alan Anderson, Assistant Superintendent, Uganda Police Force.
- Frederick George Appleton, Chief Inspector, Hong Kong Police Force.
- Antony Lucien Archer, Inspector, Kenya Police Force.
- William Hugh Randall Armstrong, Superintendent, Barbados Police Force.
- Edward Yaw Asante, Inspector, Gold Coast Police Force.
- Abu Bakar bin Abdul Ghani, Constable, Special Constabulary, Federation of Malaya.
- Abu Bakar bin Che Chik, Inspector, Federation of Malaya Police Force.
- John Harry Baker, Superintendent, Kenya Police Force.
- Josephine Agnes Becker, Chief Inspector, Kenya Police Force.
- William Thomson Bell, Assistant Superintendent, Kenya Police Force.
- Dumbuya Bendugu, Sergeant, Sierra Leone Police Force.
- Arthur Evan Bruhier, Inspector, British Honduras Police Force.
- Gilbert Chakalunta, Detective Inspector, Northern Rhodesia Police Force.
- Chu Leung, Detective-Sergeant, Hong Kong Police Force.
- Peter Chye, Assistant Superintendent, Federation of Malaya Police Force.
- Nathan Leslie Cohen, Honorary Assistant Superintendent, Police Volunteer Reserve, Federation of Malaya.
- Bertram Leopold Collins, Sergeant, Jamaica Constabulary.
- Costas Constantinides, Sergeant Major, Cyprus Police Force.
- William Richard Coombe, Superintendent, Federation of Malaya Police Force.
- Ronald Thomas Cooper, Superintendent, Tanganyika Police Force.
- Norman John Curtis, Lieutenant, Federation of Malaya Police Force.
- Hendry Beattie Dewar, Chief Inspector, Hong Kong Police Force.
- Osuman Doba, Sergeant-Major, Nigeria Police Force.
- Edward Caston Eates, Senior Superintendent, Sierra Leone Police Force.
- Llewellyn Bramwell Lewis Evans, District Commandant, Kenya Police Reserve.
- James Neish Ferguson, Superintendent, Gambia Police Force.
- Norman Burgess Fraser, MBE, Senior Superintendent, Hong Kong Police Force.
- Costas Petrou Georghiades, Inspector, Cyprus Police Force.
- Peter Emmanuel Gomez. Constable, British Honduras Police Force.
- Mensah Grunshie, Sergeant, Gold Coast Police Force.
- Ibrahim bin Hitam, Chief Inspector, Federation of Malaya Police Force.
- Mohamed Jais bin Haji Ahmad, Sub-Inspector, Singapore Police Force.
- Jerais bin Hussein, Sergeant, Special Constabulary, Federation of Malaya.
- Josia son of Aiko, Corporal, Tanganyika Police Force.
- Mehmet Kiamil, Local Commandant, Special Constabulary, Cyprus.
- Frederick Mwariri Kihoto, Inspector, Kenya Police Force.
- Yozefu Kiwanuka son of P. Matuga, Detective Station Sergeant, Uganda Police Force.
- James Keli Koroma, Sub-Inspector, Sierra Leone Police Force.
- Langerua son of Lekereo, Constable, Kenya Police Reserve.
- Abdul Latiff bin Jai, Sergeant Major, Federation of Malaya Police Force.
- John Raymond Lawrence, Deputy Superintendent, Federation of Malaya Police Force.
- Irene Lee, Inspector, Federation of Malaya Police Force.
- Dennis Sexton Le Poidevin, Senior Superintendent, Uganda Police Force.
- Letchmanan son of Ramadas Naidu, Detective Sergeant, Federation of Malaya Police Force.
- James McCabe, Superintendent, Gold Coast Police Force.
- William John McColgan, Deputy Superintendent, Grenada Police Force.
- Meor Abdul Maud bin Meor Lazim, Sergeant, Special Constabulary, Federation of Malaya.
- John French Matheson, Superintendent, Northern Rhodesia Police Force.
- Merican bin Sutan, Assistant Superintendent, Federation of Malaya Police Force.
- Ivor Vernon Barfoot Mills, Superintendent, Kenya Police Force.
- Owen Mitchell, Senior Superintendent, Northern Rhodesia Police Force.
- Ernest Frederick Moss, Senior Superintendent, British Guiana Police Force.
- Njeroge Muchene, Assistant Inspector, Kenya Police Force.
- Eric Hood Mulligan, Superintendent, Kenya Police Force.
- Frank William Malone Mullin, Senior Superintendent, Nigeria Police Force.
- Nongo son of Oluch, Sergeant Major, Tanganyika Police Force.
- Henry Akwasi Nuamah, Assistant Superintendent, Gold Coast Police Force.
- Harold Odili, Inspector, Nigeria Police Force.
- Charles William Drury Ogborn, lately Superintendent of Police and Prison Superintendent, St. Helena.
- Emmanuel Oke, Inspector, Nigeria Police Force.
- Augustino Okello son of Nyayo, Detective Head Constable, Uganda Police Force.
- Alphonse Joseph Omer Ongutu, Inspector, Kenya Police Force.
- John James O'Sullivan, MBE, Deputy Superintendent, Nigeria Police Force.
- Paddy bin Mohamed, Chief Petty Officer (Sergeant Major), Federation of Malaya Police Force.
- Peter Francis Page, Deputy Superintendent, Nigeria Police Force.
- Michael Pantelides, Inspector, Cyprus Police Force.
- James Alexander Phoenix, Superintendent, British Guiana Police Force.
- Abdullah Ali Riza, Sergeant, Cyprus Police Force.
- Gurdial Singh, son of Lall Singh, Sergeant Major, Federation of Malaya Police Force.
- Louis Leopold Smith, Sub-Inspector, Sierra Leone Police Force.
- Sockalingam, son of Kandia, Inspector, Federation of Malaya Police Force.
- Cithamdaram Murutiah Sunderaj, Assistant Superintendent, Federation of Malaya Police Force.
- John Rowland Swain, Superintendent, Nigeria Police Force.
- Tan Kian alias Tan Hock Lin, Inspector, Federation of Malaya Police Force.
- Augustus Abraham Tibo, Assistant Superintendent, Gold Coast Police Force.
- Benneth Emrys Wadeley, Assistant Superintendent, Gold Coast Police Force.
- Cecil Devereux Fynn-Williams, Assistant Superintendent, Gold Coast Police Force.
- Wilson, son of Okoyo, Sergeant, Tanganyika Police Force.
- Leslie Stewart Wink, Senior Superintendent, Kenya Police Force.
- Wong Wing Yin, Inspector, Hong Kong Police Force.
- Norman James Woodgates, Assistant Superintendent, Kenya Police Force.
- Yow Chong Hoi, Detective Staff Sergeant, Singapore Police Force.
- Zaleha binti Yahaya, Sergeant, Special Constabulary, Federation of Malaya.

== Australia ==
=== Knight Bachelor ===
- John Victor Hall Best, BDS, FDSRCS, formerly Federal President of the Australian Dental Association. For public services.
- Allen Stanley Brown, CBE, Secretary of the Prime Minister's Department, Canberra, and Secretary to the Cabinet.
- Angus Sinclair Mitchell, of Melbourne. For public services to the Commonwealth of Australia.

=== Order of the Bath ===
==== Companion of the Order of the Bath (CB) ====
Military Division

- Air Vice-Marshal Allan Leslie Walters, CBE, AFC, Royal Australian Air Force.

=== Order of Saint Michael and Saint George ===
==== Companion of the Order of St Michael and St George (CMG) ====
- Malcolm Henry Ellis, an Australian author and journalist.
- William Francis James McCann, DSO, OBE, MC. For services on behalf of ex-servicemen in the Commonwealth of Australia.
- Edward Emerton Warren, MSM. For services to the Coal Industry in the Commonwealth of Australia.
- Oliver Holmes Woodward, MC. For services to Mining and Metallurgy in the Commonwealth of Australia.

=== Order of the British Empire ===
==== Knight Commander of the Order of the British Empire (KBE) ====
Military Division

- Lieutenant-General Henry Wells, CB, CBE, DSO, Chief of the General Staff, Australian Military Forces.

Civil Division

- Richard James Fildes Boyer, Chairman of the Australian Broadcasting Commission. For public services.
- James Robert McGregor. For services to the wool industry in the Commonwealth of Australia.
- Frederick Beaumont Phillips, CBE, Chief Judge of the Supreme Court of the Territory of Papua and New Guinea.

==== Commander of the Order of the British Empire (CBE) ====
Military Division

- Brigadier Noel William Simpson, DSO, ED, General List, Australian Military Forces.
- Brigadier Ronald Eustace Wade, OBE, Australian Staff Corps.
- Group Captain Alfred George Pither, Royal Australian Air Force.

Civil Division

- Harold Raymond Cowdery. For services to the wool industry in the Commonwealth of Australia.
- George Adie Ferguson, President of the Australian Book Publishers' Association.
- Henry Christian Hopman, MBE, of Hawthorn, Victoria. For services to Sport, especially Australian tennis.
- Frederick Austin Johnston, of Mt. Lawley, Western Australia. For services rendered under the auspices of various organisations to the community in the Commonwealth of Australia.
- Ian Munro McLennan, a Member of the Immigration Planning Council.
- Richard Warwick Nevile. For social welfare services, especially in connection with the Young Men's Christian Association.
- James Plimsoll, Assistant Secretary, Department of External Affairs, Canberra.

==== Officer of the Order of the British Empire (OBE) ====
Military Division

- Commander Henry Swinfield Chesterman, Royal Australian Navy.
- Lieutenant-Commander Richard Llewellyn Stevenson, VRD, ADC, Royal Australian Naval Reserve.
- Lieutenant-Colonel (Honorary Colonel) Kathleen Annie Louise Best, RRC, Women's Royal Australian Army Corps.
- Lieutenant-Colonel Charles Hansen Costello, ED, Royal Australian Army Service Corps.
- Colonel Neal Lincoln Currie, Australian Staff Corps.
- Major Eric Sydney Marshall, Royal Australian Infantry Corps.
- Group Captain Ian Yeaman, Royal Australian Air Force.

Civil Division

- George John Angell, of Toowong, Queensland. For services to ex-servicemen and women.
- Jessie Eleanor Bage, of Toorak, Victoria. For social welfare services in the Commonwealth of Australia.
- Councillor Leo Patrick George Barry, of Snowy River Shire Council, New South Wales. For public services to the Commonwealth of Australia.
- Muriel Evelyn Bush, a pioneer of the Girl Guide Movement in the Commonwealth of Australia.
- Maud Isabel Chambers, of Toorak, Victoria. For social welfare services in the Commonwealth of Australia.
- Robert Irvine Hillard, MC, of Mildura, Victoria. For services to ex-servicemen and women and their dependants.
- Maurice John Kelly, JP, of Kew, Victoria. For services to ex-servicemen and women and their dependants.
- Robert James Mair, Second Commissioner of Taxation, Canberra.
- James Vincent Moroney, First Assistant Secretary (Marketing), Department of Commerce and Agriculture, Canberra.
- Dorothy Anne Mowll, of Edgecliff, New South Wales. For services to many Church movements in the Commonwealth of Australia.
- James Clive Perry, First Assistant Secretary, Department of Air, Canberra.
- George Starritt. For services to the primary industry in the Commonwealth of Australia.
- Thomas Sten, of Claremont, Western Australia. For services to ex-servicemen and women.
- Edgar Richard Tink, of Balgowlah, New South Wales. For social welfare services in the Commonwealth of Australia.
- The Very Reverend Alfred Roscoe Wilson, Dean of Melbourne. For services to the community in the Commonwealth of Australia.

==== Member of the Order of the British Empire (MBE) ====
Military Division

- Lieutenant-Commander (S) D'Arcy Allman Tarrant, Royal Australian Navy.
- Captain (Quartermaster) Thomas Noel Power Callaghan, Royal Australian Army Ordnance Corps.
- Major (temporary) Neil Edgar Cornish, Royal Australian Engineers.
- Major (temporary) William Crooks, Royal Australian Infantry Corps.
- Warrant Officer Class II Henry John Gibson, Royal Australian Corps of Signals.
- Major Thomas Graeme Hogarth Jackson (210376), Royal Corps of Signals.
- Lieutenant (Quartermaster) Leonard Albert Marshall, Royal Australian Infantry Corps.
- Warrant Officer Class I Edward Robottom, Royal Australian Artillery.
- Captain (Quartermaster) Frederick James Wright, Royal Australian Infantry Corps.
- Acting Squadron Leader Thomas George Janes, Royal Australian Air Force.
- Acting Flight Lieutenant Lionel Clarence Conduit, Citizen Air Force, Commonwealth of Australia.
- Acting Flight Lieutenant Leonard William George Grove-Jones, Citizen Air Force, Commonwealth of Australia.
- Warrant Officer Gustav Charles Wensemius, Royal Australian Air Force.

Civil Division

- Mary Anderson, a Major in the Salvation Army, Commonwealth of Australia.
- Mary Ellinor Lucy Archer, lately Chief Librarian, Council for Scientific and Industrial Research, Commonwealth of Australia.
- Amelia Martha Best, of Launceston, Tasmania. For social welfare services in the Commonwealth of Australia.
- Horace Eddy Bishop, Director, Income Tax Section, Taxation Head Office, Canberra.
- Joseph William Chapman, Superintendent, Anglican Mission, Edward River, Gulf of Carpentaria.
- William Henry Clay, Director, Social Services Board, Federal Conference of the Churches of Christ in Australia.
- Reginald Harry Coates, of Brisbane. For services in the interests of ex-servicemen and women and their dependants.
- Ruve Fiddes Duthie Cropley, of North Sydney. For social welfare services in the Commonwealth of Australia.
- Mary Myrtle Ferguson, of Alice Springs. For services to the children of outback Australia.
- Hilda Mary Fraser, Head Matron of the Kingsley Fairbridge Farm School, Pinjarra, Western Australia.
- Margaret Graham, of Perth, Western Australia. For social welfare services to children in the Commonwealth of Australia.
- Honorary Lieutenant-Colonel Harold Ernest Hovendene, of Bexley, New South Wales. For services to ex-service personnel.
- Wellesley Burgoyne Hudson, of Turramurra, New South Wales. For public and social welfare services in the Commonwealth of Australia.
- Councillor Cyril Claude Johnson, of the Oxley Shire Council, Victoria. For public services to the Commonwealth of Australia.
- Ian William Johnson, of Middle Park, Victoria. For services to Sport, especially Australian cricket.
- The Reverend Mother Ursula Kennedy, Mother General of Queensland Presentation Sisters. For services to the community in the Commonwealth of Australia.
- Charles Leslie Kuffer, of Maryborough, Victoria. For services to the Voluntary Aid Detachment and the Red Cross in the Commonwealth of Australia.
- Matthew Luke, JP, a member of the Legislative Council in the Northern Territory.
- William Neil Mitchell MacDonald, of Fitzroy Crossing, Western Australia. For services to the pastoral industry in the Commonwealth of Australia.
- Keith Ross Miller, of Dee Why, New South Wales. For services to Sport, especially Australian cricket.
- Winifred Annie Nance, of Colac, Victoria. For social welfare services in the Commonwealth of Australia.
- George Roy Parker, lately Acting First Assistant Secretary (Budget and Accounting Branch), Department of the Treasury, Canberra.
- William Henry Paterson, of Malvern, Victoria. For services to the blind in the Commonwealth of Australia.
- Winifred Payne, of Hamilton, Queensland. For social welfare services in the Commonwealth of Australia.
- Margaret Penelope McKenzie Rain, of Learmonth, Victoria. For services rendered to the community under the auspices of the Australian Red Cross.
- William Layton Rudder, of Indooroopilly. Queensland. For services in promoting the assimilation, of new settlers in the Commonwealth of Australia.
- Henry George Allen Sansom, lately Superintending Engineer, South Australia, Postmaster-General's Department.
- Reginald Frank Turner, a member of the staff of the Postmaster-General's Department at Maitland. For services during the floods in New South Wales.
- Hannah Mary Williams, of Malvern, South Australia. For services in promoting the assimilation of new settlers in the Commonwealth of Australia.

=== British Empire Medal (BEM) ===
Military Division

- Aircraft Artificer 3rd Class Thomas Joseph Allsop, A.44386, Royal Australian Navy.
- Chief Petty Officer Robert George Watson, F.1695, Royal Australian Naval Reserve.
- F2/108 Sergeant (temporary Warrant Officer Class II) Gladys Jean Batty, Women's Royal Australian Army Corps.
- 3/3298 Sergeant (temporary Staff-Sergeant) Clifford Maxwell Browning, Royal Australian Infantry Corps.
- 4/205 Sergeant (temporary Warrant Officer Class II) Neil Alan Dahl, Royal Australian Engineers.
- 2/2176 Sergeant (provisional Warrant Officer Class II) Frederick William John Fitzpatrick, Royal Australian Armoured Corps.
- 6/124 Sergeant (provisional Staff-Sergeant) Donald Eric Huxley, Royal Australian Corps of Signals.
- 3/182694 Sergeant (temporary Warrant Officer Class II) Donald Sutere McCullough, Royal Australian Armoured Corps.
- 4/14464 Sergeant Samuel Stanley Thomas, Royal Australian Artillery.
- A.1227 Sergeant Raymond Frederick Slade, Royal Australian Air Force.
- A.31661 Sergeant James Gordon Whitling, Royal Australian Air Force.
- A.31666 Corporal Albert Clifford Matthews, Air Training Corps, Royal Australian Air Force.
- A.2317 Flight Sergeant Ronald Ellis Chaffey, Royal Australian Air Force, in recognition of services in Korea and Japan after the cease fire.

=== Air Force Cross (AFC) ===
- Flight Lieutenant Thomas Stanley Judd (0219), Royal Australian Air Force.

=== Air Force Medal (AFM) ===
- 14455329 Sergeant Robert Meaton, Royal Regiment of Artillery, in recognition of distinguished service in Korea.

=== Queen's Commendation for Valuable Service in the Air ===
- Flight Lieutenant Keith Raymond Bartlett (022184), Royal Australian Air Force.

== Ceylon ==
=== Knight Bachelor ===
- Ratnakirti Senarat Serasinghe Gunewardene, Her Majesty's Ambassador Extraordinary and Plenipotentiary of Ceylon in Washington.

=== Order of Saint Michael and Saint George ===
==== Knight Commander of the Order of St Michael and St George (KCMG) ====
- Sir Arthur Marcelles de Silva, KBE, FRCS, LRCP, Member, Public Service Commission.

==== Companion of the Order of St Michael and St George (CMG) ====
- Colonel Christopher Allan Hector Perera Jayawardana, CVO, OBE, ED. For public services.
- Professor Joseph Lionel Christie Rodrigo, Dean of the Faculty of Arts, and Head of the Department of Western Classics, University of Ceylon.

=== Order of the British Empire ===
==== Commander of the Order of the British Empire (CBE) ====
Civil Division

- Thianbripolage Alfred Fernando, MBE. For public services.
- Juvanvidane'rallage Don Abraham Perera, Lecturer-Principal, Government College of Fine Arts.
- Edmund Perera Wijetunge, Proctor of the Supreme Court.

==== Officer of the Order of the British Empire (OBE) ====
Military Division

- Lieutenant-Colonel Candauda Aratchige Dharmapala, Ruhunu Regiment.
- Lieutenant-Colonel Terence Richard Jansen, MBE, ED, Ceylon Army Medical Corps.

Civil Division

- Gerald Henry Cooray, MBE, MD, MRCS, Professor of Pathology, University of Ceylon.
- Allan Bertram Demmer, MBE, lately Acting General Manager, Ceylon Government Railways.
- Stanley Fredrick De Saram, Area Commandant, Colombo, Special Police Reserve.
- Evelyn Johanna Publina, Lady De Soysa. For social services.
- Malwattege Simon Andrew Peeris, Member of Parliament for Badulla.
- Carthigesu Sathananthan, Joint Head Cashier, Mercantile Bank of India, Ltd., Colombo.
- Sellamuttu Sivanathan. For services to Commerce.
- Oliver Weerasinghe, MBE, Government Town Planner.

==== Member of the Order of the British Empire (MBE) ====
Military Division

- Captain John Denzil Soysa, Ceylon Light Infantry.
- Major Alexander Richard Udugama, Ceylon Light Infantry.

Civil Division

- Samuel Robert Ameresekere, Proctor.
- Shantikumar Chandulal Banker, managing director, Messrs. Narottam & Pereira, Ltd., Colombo.
- Hassanally Esufally, Senior Partner, Messrs. E. G. Adamaly & Co.
- Cyril Dervin Fernando. For services to Commerce.
- Hadjie Nasoor Jainudeen. For services to Commerce.
- Clodagh Jayasuriya, Senator.
- Terry Jonklaas, Interior designer.
- Cruz Benedict Motha. For services to Commerce.
- Tirathdas Pesumal. For services to Commerce.
- George Edward Ranawake, MRCS, LRCP, Secretary, Hospital Lotteries Board.
- Senapathige John Blassius Paul Philip Rodrigo. For services to Commerce.
- Charles William Turner, District Superintendent, Ceylon District, St. John Ambulance Brigade.
- William Ernest Stork Winn, LRCP&S(Ed.), Medical Practitioner. For public services in Kandy.
- Augustus Octavius Wirasinghe, Government Agent, Kurunegala.

=== British Empire Medal (BEM) ===
Military Division

- 645180 Sergeant (acting Warrant Officer) Harold John Phillipson, Royal Air Force.

Civil Division

- Winston Maclean Alexander Flanderka, Camera Maintenance Technician, Government Film Unit.
- Chellappah Nadarajah, Clerk, Grade II, Department of the Prime Minister.
- Gerard Paul, Bandmaster, Ceylon Police Band.
- Frederick Evans Perkins, Chief Preventive Officer, Department of the Principal Collector of Customs.

== Pakistan ==
=== Knight Bachelor ===
- Thomas Arthur Wyness Foy, CSI, CIE, lately Chief Engineer, Lower Sind Barrage.

=== Order of the British Empire ===
==== Commander of the Order of the British Empire (CBE) ====
Military Division

- Colonel (temporary) George William Howard Peters, DSO, MC, (49935), The Bedfordshire and Hertfordshire Regiment.

==== Officer of the Order of the British Empire (OBE) ====
Military Division

- Acting Commander (E) Reginald Thomas Jones, MBE, DSC, Royal Navy.
- Squadron Leader John Newall Williams (144601), Royal Air Force.

Civil Division

- Gilbert Francis d'Adhemar, Chief Commercial Manager, North-Western Railway.
- Edward Dixon, lately Coal Commissioner.
- John Rodger Leclaire, deputy director of Studies and Training, Royal Pakistan Air Force Apprentice School.
- Percy Charles Miller, MBE, Chief Engineer, Ordnance Factories.
- Lionel Hewett Niblett, Deputy Commissioner, Chittagong Hill Tracts.
- Isaac John Norton, Production Engineer, Ordnance Factories, Wan.

==== Member of the Order of the British Empire (MBE) ====
Military Division

- Vera Elsie Dyer, Matron, Royal Pakistan Naval Nursing Service.
- Major Donald Vane-Hamilton, Pakistan Electrical and Mechanical Engineers.
- Major and Technical Officer, Telecommunications, Thomas McAuley McLuskie (238768), Royal Corps of Signals.

Civil Division

- Benjamin Gilbert Brooks, Professor and Head of the Department of English Language and Literature, University of Peshawar.
- Archibald Ross Dutton, Chief Engineer, Khairpur Textile Mills.
- Thomas Leslie Howson, Senior Education Officer, Royal Pakistan Air Force Apprentice School.
- Tiffany May, Registrar, Punjab Nursing Council and Midwives Board.
- Benjamin Arthur Perry, Assistant Secretary, Board of Revenue, West Pakistan.
- Violet Mildred Rees, Superintendent, Nursing Services, East Bengal.

=== British Empire Medal (BEM) ===
Military Division

- 569096 Flight Sergeant Victor Sidney Davenport, Royal Air Force.
- 543668 Acting Right Sergeant Frederick Edward George Bond, Royal Air Force.

Civil Division

- Thomas Thompson Parham, Assistant Foreman of Laboratory, Royal Pakistan Navy Armament Depot, Malir.
