= Ghana–United Kingdom relations =

- Ghana: United Kingdom

Diplomatic mission
- High Commission of Ghana, London: British High Commission, Accra

Envoy
- High Commissioner Papa Owusu-Ankomah: High Commissioner Harriet Thompson

Ghanianian President John Mahama with British Prime Minister Andy Burnham at a Commonwealth summit in Antigua, November 2026

Ghana–United Kingdom relations are the diplomatic, historical and trade relations between the Republic of Ghana and the United Kingdom of Great Britain and Northern Ireland. Modern state Ghana-UK relations began when Ghana became independent from the UK in 1957 as the Dominion of Ghana.

== Overview ==
People have been migrated between the area today known as Ghana and the UK since 1555. In 1880–1919 there were 150 Ghanaians living in the UK. The 1961 census recorded 10,000 Ghanaians living in the UK, the largest number of British Ghanaians moved to the UK between 1957 and 1980 due to the economic climate in Ghana. Ghana was the first African nation to gain independence from the UK in 1957. In 2001, there were 56,112 British-/Ghanaians lived in the UK, in 2011 there were 95,666 British-Ghanaians according to the UK census, with the Office for National Statistics reporting a rise to 114,000 in 2019. The majority of these live in Greater London and Manchester. With the completion of Brexit, both countries signed the Interim Trade Partnership Agreement on 2 March 2020, worth around £1.2 billion.

=== History ===
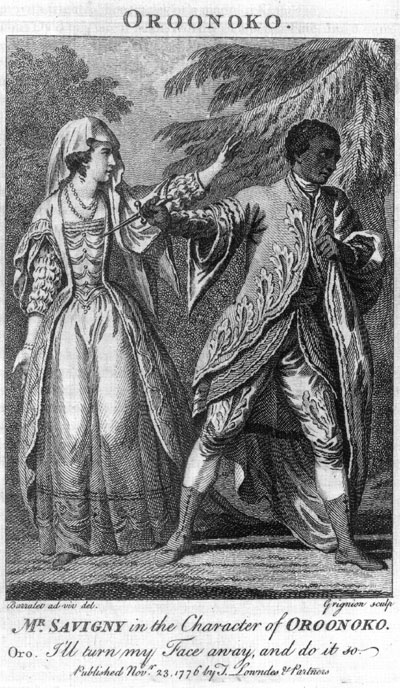
Oroonoko by Aphra Behn (1776)

==== 16th and 17th century ====
Early contact with the area known today as Ghana began in 1555 when John Lok brought back five Ghanaians to encourage trade relations with Western Africa. The English by then were interested in the Gold coast for trading pepper, spice and gold, appointing the first English Governor in 1621, although relations between the UK and Ghana were limited in the 17th century. In the latter half of the 17th century the British participated in the Atlantic slave trade, the British crown first showing interest with the inception of the Royal African Company in 1660, which drastically affected the local and West African coastal populations over the next 250 years. The British, unlike the local groups, practiced chattel slavery.

==== 1800-1824 ====
The Ashanti Empire (1701–1957) had resisted attempts by Europeans, chiefly the British, to subjugate them. However, the British annexed neighbouring areas, together with the Fante. The Ashanti allied themselves with the Dutch against the British, who allied themselves with the Fante. Disputes between the Fante and Ashanti often lead to European involvement in local disputes, the first of which began in 1806 when the Ashanti–Fante War, also known as the Ghana War, broke out with the Ashanti being victorious, capturing the Assin chief Kwadwo Otibu who was charged with harbouring Oyoko grave robbers on charges by the Asantehene Osei Bonsu. Otibu had been held under British occupation at Anomabu fort, and was eventually surrendered to the Ashanti King with other captives as slaves by Colonel George Torrance when the Ashanti stormed the fort, killing 8,000 local Gold Coast residents outside the fort. A successive series of conflicts between the Ashanti and British took place from this time on. In 1811 the Ga–Fante War saw the defeat of the Ashanti by the Fante, with the Ashanti and Ga-Adangbe people successfully capturing the British fort of Tantamkweri. In 1814 the Ashanti launched an invasion of the Gold Coast, warring against the tribes and federacies allied with the British, which launched renegotiations between the Ashanti and British, Dutch, Polish, and Danish authorities in the area. In 1817 the ACoM signed a new agreement accepting Ashanti reign in the Gold Coast, in accession for British control over nearby local Gold Coast residents to British Forts. A British delegate, Joseph Dupuis then arrived at Cape Coast in January 1819 who set out on 9 February 1820, and on the 28th arrived at Kumasi. After several meetings with the local king, a treaty was drawn up, which acknowledged the sovereignty of Ashanti over the territory of the Fanti, and left the Fante open to attack by the Ashanti. J. Hope Smith, the governor of Cape Coast, disowned the treaty, as betraying the Fante interests under British protection. Under Smiths advice, from 1821 to 1824 with the dissolution of ACoM the British in the Gold Coast began taking direct control of forts and dropped Dupuis' treaty, once more supporting the Fante.

==== Anglo-Ashanti conflicts of 1824-1900 ====
Mid December 1822, a biracial African-British sergeant from the Royal African Corps who acted as the agent between the British and the Asante was said to have shown 'disrespect' to the Asante King Osei Tutu Quamina. Captain Laing offered to retrieve the Sergeant but was denied by MacCarthy. Therefore, at the King's request, the Sergeant was captured and left in prison in Kumasi until 1 February 1823, when again at the behest of the King, killed the Sergeant with orders 'to send the jawbone, skull, and one of the arms ... to [Osei]' by the following day from Anomabu, such actions being considered a declaration of war by the British. With this a small British group under the guidance of MacCarthy went ahead to talk with the Ashanti, but instead 10 were killed, 39 wounded and led to a British retreat. The Ashanti then tried to negotiate with MacCarthy over claims for Fante land which as the Fante fell under British protection, such claims were rejected leading to the first Anglo-Ashanti war in 1824. MacCarthy who led the initial British attack of 500–1000 men, died in Accra when the Ashanti with a force of 10,000, won the battle and took MacCarthy's skull, and encrusting it with gold they used it as a spoil of war. After the British victory at the Katamanso War, Accra and British prestige rose in the area, with the British no longer paying rent in the forts. With the MacClean treaty of 1831, all British territory became south of the River Prah. Kwaku Dua I encouraged trade with MacClean's administration, but by 1852 disputes between the Ashanti and Fante began anew.

A large number of Yoruba people in this period had resettled in the British colony of Sierra Leone, which was established to home Africans who had escaped the slave trade. In 1838 a number of Egba people returned with a knowledge of English and Christianity, helping to spread the Anglican and particularly Methodist presence in the Gold Coast. Egba cooperation against the neighbouring kingdom of Dahomey, which was a prominent player in the slave trade, particularly of Egba peoples who had fought against their enslavement by the Dahomenians between 1842 and 1853 was greatly assisted by Anglican missionaries who persuading the Egba to end the siege in exchange for their armed support against Dahomey. The export of West Africans to the Americas had decreased with the banning of slavery in Brazil in 1850 and the bombardment by the British of Lagos in an anti-slave raid. The British continued providing assistance to Gold Coast tribes who had been enslaved, but this would begin to be used as a pretext for British military presence and the eventual British annexation of the Gold Coast. In 1853 the British opened a consulate in Lagos, annexing the area as a British protectorate in 1861 after heightened tensions and British involvement in local disputes between neighbouring Gold Coast leaders.

In 1863–1864, the second Anglo-Ashanti war (or Incident, more accurately as no fighting took place) was fought. The war began when the British Governor refused to hand over Kwasi Gyani who turned to the British either because he had stolen a chunk of gold or because he was an indentured servant of the Asantehene, to which the Ashanti took offence to Pines actions because Pine regarded Gyani as innocent, whilst under Ashanti law he was guilty of having not returned the nugget, which the Ashanti took to break their treaty with the British In 1864 with the invasion by Dahomey of Abeokuta, the British began increasing their military presence in the Gold Coast, splitting the area they governed at the Yewa River between themselves and the French.

The Anglo-Dutch Gold Coast Treaty (1867) was signed, redistributing power over to the British from a withdrawal of Dutch presence in the Gold Coast. In 1872, Britain expanded outwards again when they purchased the Dutch Gold Coast from the Dutch, including Elmina fort which caused by financial dispute between the British and the Ashanti. The Dutch, the original renters, signed the Treaty of Butre (1656) with the Ahanta which was unchanged for 213 years. After grievances over rent payments, the Ashanti invaded the new British protectorate and in 1873–1874 the third Anglo-Ashanti war took place. Garnet Wolseley commanded an expedition to the Ashanti, making all his arrangements at the Gold Coast before the arrival of the troops in January 1874, completing the campaign with remarkable speed, returning to Britain in under two months. At the Battle of Amoaful on 31 January Wolseley's expedition faced the numerically superior Chief Amankwatia's army in a four-hour battle. They advanced and after five days' fighting, ending with the Battle of Ordashu, entered the capital Kumasi, which Wolsely ordered be burned. The British were impressed by the size of the palace and the scope of its contents. The Ashanti then signed the Treaty of Fomena in July 1874 marking the end of the war and human sacrifice under Kofi Karikari's rule. This led to a great establishment of trade between the Gold Coast and Britain. From the 18th century to 1874 a large number of Gold Coast residents were sailors who lived in the London docks, a number came from Accra and Sekondi and in turn migrated from Liberia. From 1880 to 1919 there were 150 Ghanaians in Britain, many who came to study in London, some pursuing business.

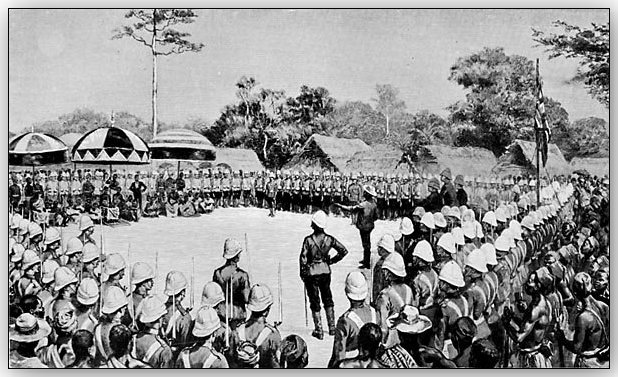
Asantehene Prempeh's subjugation (1896)

In the Fourth Anglo-Ashanti War, also known as the "Second Ashanti Expedition", lasted only from December 1895 to February 1896. The Ashanti turned down an unofficial offer to become a British protectorate in 1891, extending to 1894. The Ashanti king rempeh I refused to surrender his sovereignty and the British aiming to keep French and German forces out of Ashanti territory (for its gold), began planning to conquer the Ashanti kingdom. Asantehene Agyeman Prempeh was unwilling to pay the 50,000 gold oz. ransom, so the British arrested, deposed and exiled him, while he was forced to sign a treaty of protection, and with other Ashanti leaders was sent into exile in the Seychelles. The British force left Kumasi on 22 January 1896, arriving back at the coast two weeks later, with the area becoming a British protectorate in 1897.

==== 20th century ====
In the War of the Golden Stool on 25 March 1900, the British representative, Frederick Mitchell Hodgson committed a political error by insisting he should sit on the Golden Stool, not understanding that it was the Royal throne and very sacred to the Ashanti. He ordered a search be made for it and the Ashanti, enraged by this act, attacked the soldiers engaged in the search, leading to fighting between the British and Ashanti. On 14 July a British force of 1,000 made it to Kumasi, relieving the besieged Hodgson on 15 July. The remaining Ashanti court, including Yaa Asantewaa not exiled to the Seychelles had mounted the offensive against the British and Fanti troops resident at the Kumasi Fort, but were defeated. The Ashanti territories became part of the Gold Coast colony on 1 January 1902, on the condition that the Golden Stool would not be violated by British or other non-Akan foreigners. In September the British sent flying columns out to visit neighbouring peoples who had supported the rebellion, resulting in more fighting. The Ashanti claimed victory as the Golden Stool was safe, found by accident in 1920. King Prempeh I returned from exile in 1924, travelling to Kumasi by a special train.

== Independence ==
Following frequent disfavour with British rule, Ghanaians began to politically organize in favour of independence. The Gold Coast Colony, as Ghana was then known, had a large native-elected legislature in which the indigenous population already elected large parts of the colony's government. In the post-World War II era, the two political parties of the United Gold Coast Convention in 1947 and the Convention People's Party from 1948 both campaigned by advocating for independence, and both won a number of seats in the Gold Coast Colonial Legislature. They petitioned the British government for a path towards independence. British Prime Minister Harold Macmillan was very supportive of the idea of African independence anyway (which at the time was considered controversial within his party) and he agreed. A referendum was held to see if the people of the Gold Coast Colony/Ghana supported independence, though Macmillan knew they would vote in favour of it, this was mainly done as both a formality and as a way for him to demonstrate that this measure had popular support in the effected country. The referendum passed and Macmillan began preparing for decolonization. The Gold Coast Colony had a large portion of its bureaucracy manned by indigenous Africans already, British Prime Minister MacMillan and African nationalist leader Kwame Nkrumah both argued this would make independence simpler, and in effect it would just be a smooth handoff. Only the "very top of the bureaucracy" would have to have any serious reorganization. They made this argument on the grounds that the post office, the rail system, law enforcement, the road system and the tax collection services were already entirely staffed by "Gold Coast natives." Adding to this, a higher portion of people in the Gold Coast were literate than was the case in any other European colony in Africa, with Sierra Leone being a close second. Under instruction from Prime Minister MacMillan, the British Parliament passed the Ghana Independence Act 1957, making Ghana a Dominion through the Ghana Independence Act 1957. Three years later, with the 1960 Ghanaian constitutional referendum, monarchy in Ghana was abolished and thus ended Ghana's status as a Dominion. With a change in the head of state in Ghana however, diplomatic relations resumed between the two countries. Kwame Nkrumah maintained a good working relationship with Prime Minister Harold Macmillan and Macmillan's successor Alec Douglas-Home, both of whom Nkrumah spoke highly of. Nkrumah sought to have a closer relationship with the United Kingdom than he did with the United States. In 1964, 1965 and 1966 he also had many meetings with British Prime Minister Harold Wilson, who he formed a good working relationship with as well. Both Wilson and Nkrumah were outspoken in their desire for South Africa to end apartheid.

In 1981, Ghana became a Commonwealth republic under a military regime led by Jerry Rawlings. With this, an increased exchange of Ghanaian and British immigrants brought their culture and ideas to the UK, such as Afrobeat. In 2019, this has been represented by figures such as the politicians Abena Oppong-Asare and Bell Ribeiro-Addy.

President John Kufuor had a strong relationship with the United Kingdom and was awarded the Knight Grand Cross of the Order of the Bath (2006) British Prime Minister Tony Blair and Ghanaian President John Kufuor worked closely together on a number of issues including issues of peace and stability in Liberia and Sierra Leone as well as how to effectively boost foreign aid to Africa and economic development within Africa. Blair encouraged other European leaders to drop trade barriers that held Africa back, President Kufuor welcomed these developments and viewed Blair as an effective leader. In 2007, President Kufuor and Prime Minister Blair agreed to a high-intensity ten year development plan for Ghana, which was widely praised as one of the most successful such plans in modern African history and one of the few entirely positive engagements with Africa by a European government. Blair's successor Gordon Brown led international efforts to boost aid and healthcare assistance efforts for Africa.

Brown engaged more with Ghana than any other foreign leader in 2009 and 2010. The following Prime Minister, David Cameron also had a strong relationship with Ghana, increasing military and economic cooperation with Ghana. Britain supplies the Ghana Air Force with numerous aircraft including the de Havilland Heron, Short SC.7 Skyvan, Britten-Norman BN-2 Islander, Beagle Husky, Westland Wessex, Westland Whirlwind and the Scottish Aviation Bulldog.

In February 2021, Ghana and the United Kingdom signed a post-Brexit trade agreement, this agreement allows the United Kingdom and Ghana to be much closer economically than would have been allowed had the United Kingdom remained in the European Union. The Interim Trade Partnership Agreement signed between the United Kingdom and Ghana on 2 March 2020 is worth around £1.2 billion.

=== Chronology of Ghanaian-British relations ===
Early

- 1555: John Lok, a London merchant, brings five Ghanaians, Binne, Anthonie and George, to London from Sharma to become interpreters to assist the English with trade in West Africa and in Gold with Ghana
- 1596: Elizabeth I notes the presence of Blackamoores, the most common word for Black Britons in use at the time
- 1621–23: William St John, the first Gold Coast governor is appointed
- 1688: Aphra Behn's Oroonoko is published, its title perhaps derived from the Yoruba names of the Coromantee enslaved peoples at the time living in Dutch Surinam
- 1748: William Ansah Sessarakoo arrives in England on a diplomatic mission on behalf of the Fante people
- 1752–1821: The African Company of Merchants (ACoM) begins operations, building trading posts such as Fort Tantumquery and Fort Komenda and operated from Cape Coast Castle
- 1753: The ACoM abducts two boys, Acqua and Sackee, bringing them to London as hostages in a bid to begin trade with the Gold Coast; while in London they are educated for the next two years, with a farewell banquet being held upon their return in 1755 and Fort William is built
- 1754: Philip Quaque is brought to England by Rev. Thomas Thompson, being educated and studying Theosophy at Oxford, returning to the Gold Coast in 1766–1816 with a salary of £50 annually
- 1765: Quaque became the first African ordained as a minister within the Church of England
- 1772: Ottobah Cugoano is taken by Alexander Campbell to England, where he becomes a leading abolitionist and writer
- 1786: Committee for the Relief of the Black Poor occurs
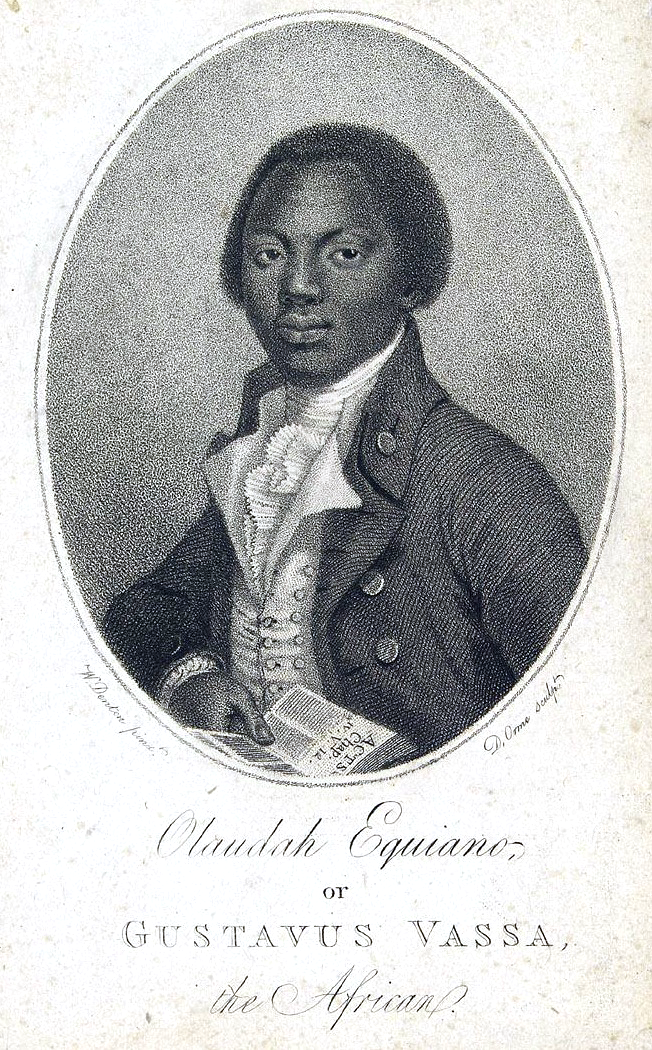
  Olaudah Equiano, member of the Abolitionist Sons of Africa
- 1787: Sons of Africa are known to be active with Cugoano among them publishing his Thoughts and sentiments on the evil and wicked traffic of the slavery and commerce of the human species.
- 1807: The British Slave Trade Act 1807 is passed, however English and American slave ships still operate under Spanish flags until 1833
- 1814: Charles MacCarthy, an avid advocate of the suppression of the slave trade, is appointed Governor of Sierra Leone, taking over the territory of the British Gold Coast in 1821
- 1816: Thomas Edward Bowdich signs a treaty with the Asante, recognising fort rents and British protection of Gold Coast residents
- 1819: Bowdich after working for the ACoM, in which he successfully made a study of Asante court life in Kumasi, convinces the British government to assume direct control over the area

British Gold Coast

- 1821: The British form the Gold Coast Colony and the ACoM is disbanded, in part for its failure to suppress and participation in the slave trade in West Africa
- 1823: MacCarthy declares war on the Asante after disagreements between them and the Fante; the British engage the Asante along a tributary of the Pra River and the majority are killed, with MacCarthy's head taken a trophy of war; he is succeeded by Charles Turner
- 1824: After the Katamanso War, the British stopped paying rent for coastal forts to the Asante
- 1828: The British decide to reduce their presence in the Gold Coast, only maintaining Cape Coast and Accra forts at the request of local merchants
- 1831: George Maclean establishes a treaty with the Asante that effectively in return for gold allows the Asante to continue in the slave trade, one of their primary trades at the time
- 1833: The Slavery Abolition Act 1833 is passed, with two British ships sent initially to cover the 20,000 mile-long coastal waters of Western Africa to prevent slave ships passing to the Americas
- 1835: Methodist Church Ghana is founded
- 1836–1841: In a bid of fidelity to the April 1831 Maclean Treaty, two Asante princes who had been taken hostage five years earlier; Prince Owusu-Ansa (1823–1884) and his cousin Prince Nkwantabisa (?–1859), travel to England to learn English and to engage with the Fante as ambassadors between the Fante and Asante peoples
- 1840: Through persistent writing, from July James Stephen prompts the Colonial Authorities in a bid to prevent the slave trade, found to be operating under Maclean's treaty the year prior, to place the Gold Coast forts authority from the Sierra Leone colonial authority and to become a colony in their own right, and under Maclean imports to England dramatically increased tenfold from 1830, cowrie shells replacing gold as currency
- 1841: Under the behest of the new Asantehene Nana Kwaaku Dua (?–1867), Prince Osuwu Ansah and Prince Nkwantabisa are taken before Queen Victoria before returning to the Gold Coast, returning with the Niger expedition of 1841 to Kumase with a £100 annual allowance from the British in order to help the Missionary society in the Kumase area, leading to the establishment of nine Methodist churches under Thomas Birch Freeman that year
- 1842: Maclean is investigated for charges of by Richard Robert Madden, who found that Maclean had unfairly imprisoned 91 local people, some up to four years, on dubious grounds and without trial. Madden's enquiries, and subsequent parliamentary select committee, concluded Maclean lacked formal powers to act effectively against the slave trade, and the Colonial Office became involved with Maclean relinquishing his post in 1844
- 1844: Henry Worsley Hill Bond Treaty is signed established British law in the area, including the abolition of human sacrifice and panyarring

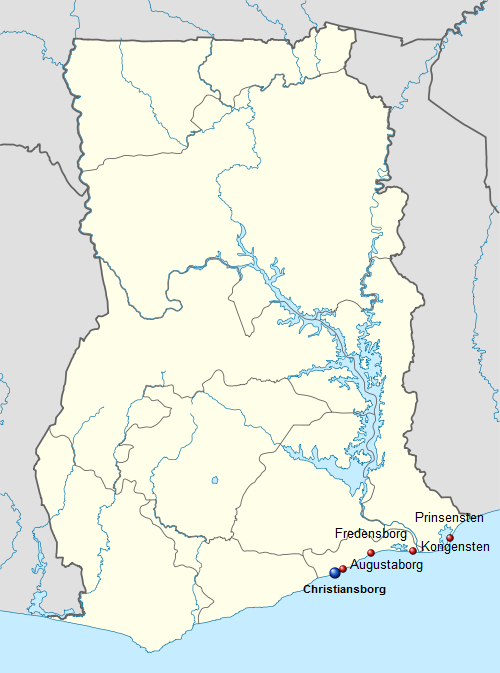
Danish Gold Coast

- 1850–57: James Bannerman is appointed as a Justice of the Peace in the Gold Coast and the Gold Coast government separates from that of the Sierra Leonean government
- 1852–1861: Poll Tax Ordinance of 1852 occurs
- 1852–64: The British implement a new poll tax among the Asante, causing widespread rioting when only 8 per cent went towards maintenance of the Gold Coast
- 1858: Benjamin Pine establishes municipal Ordinance that gives towns the right to elect a council from chiefs and merchants for local government with courts for civil litigation and criminal misdemeanors
- 1863: The Anglo-Ashanti war of 1863 begins
- 1866: In January Lieutenant-Governor Colonel Conran demanded he would be suing the Asante for peace, angering Kwaku Dua I who broke off further negotiations with the British until they surrendered Gyani to the Asante, in turn John Aggrey (1808–1869) denounced British rule over the area being exiled to Sierra Leone in 1867–1869
- 1867: Anglo-Dutch Gold Coast Treaty (1867) redistributed forts along the Dutch and British Gold Coasts in order to assimilate both areas of influence. All forts to the east of Fort Elmina were now British, and all forts to the west Dutch, with the Denkyira, Wassaw and Kommenda rejecting the Dutch presence leading to further wars between the Kommenda and Dutch at Elmina Castle; The Akwamu freed W. H. Simpson after he attempted to settle the Asantehene stooling dispute of Kofi Karikari to avoid war with the British and the Gold Coast Colony was officially created
- 1868: Fante Confederacy takes place, and Africanus Horton publishes West African Countries and Peoples, in which he suggested British influenced self-government, with a Fante kingdom and republic of Accra, recommending the abolition of slavery, the introduction of industrial schools and a resident at Kumasi be introduced
- 1872: Elmina Castle, in a cession of talks stemming from 1869 were succeeded from the Dutch to the British
- 1873: On 2 October, Garnet Wolseley became Governor of the British West African Settlements, and the Gold Coast on which he commanded an expedition to the Ashanti.
- 1874: Wolseley made all his arrangements at the Gold Coast before the arrival of the troops in January, completing the campaign in two months and returned to Britain, which made him well known in Britain. At the Battle of Amoaful Wolseley's expedition faced the numerically superior Chief Amankwatia's in battle. After five days' fighting, ending with the Battle of Ordashu, Wolseley entered Kumasi, which he burned
- 1881: John Ocansey arrives in London, travelling to Liverpool in pursuance of his fathers goods winning his case, publishing African Trading; or the trials of William Narh Ocansey that year
- 1887: John Mensah Sarbah becomes the first British-Ghanaian to be called to the bar
- 1891: Thomas Hutton-Mills Sr. travels to London to study at Cambridge
- 1893: J. E. Casely Hayford travels to London to study law at Cambridge being called in 1896
- 1897: Ashanti Goldfields Corporation is formed
- 1900: Yaa Asantewaa is defeated by the British in the War of the Golden Stool, albeit protecting the Golden Stool
- 1901: Frederick Victor Nanka-Bruce travels to Edinburgh graduating in 1906
- 1916: Association of West African Merchants (AWAM) is formed
- 1917: National Congress of British West Africa, one of the earliest Pan-African formal organisations, forms
- 1918: Kobina Sekyi, the Ghanaian nationalist and anti-colonialist writer, studies law at the University of London, being called to the bar in 1918, with the founding of the African Progress Union by John Richard Archer
- 1920: Samson Oppong and W. G. Waterworth begin proselytizing, baptizing eventually around 10,000 new Wesleyan converts to Christianity
- 1925: West African Students' Union is founded
- 1928: Desmond Buckle enters university in London, only to began his political career as the first "African communist" in Britain in the 1930s
- 1931–1951: The League of Coloured Peoples is founded
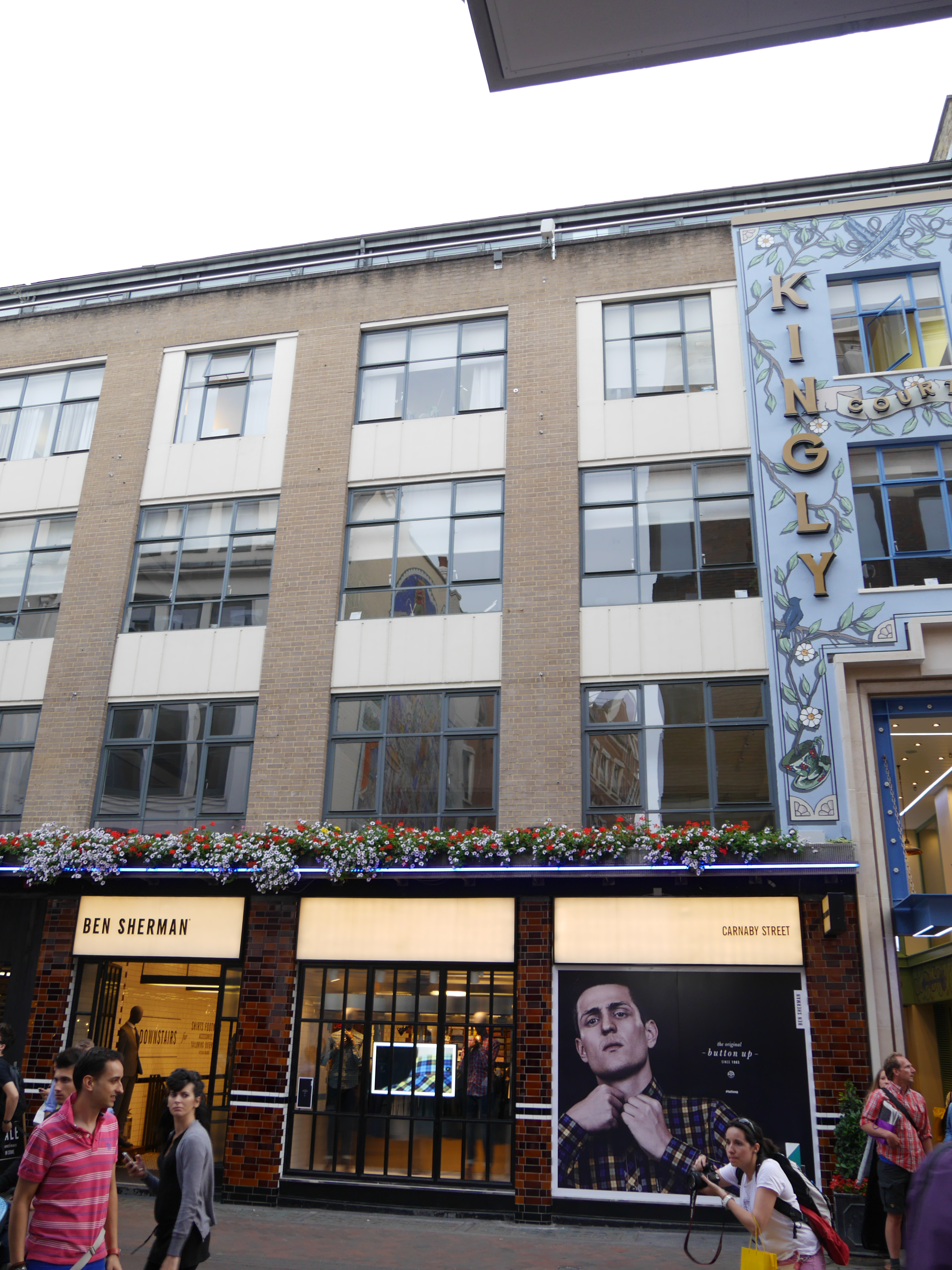
  50 Carnaby Street was the Florence Mills Social Parlour in 1936 run by Amy Ashwood as a Pan-African meeting place, visited by J. B. Danquah
- 1945–1947 - Kwame Nkrumah resides in the UK founding the West African National Secretariat, Kojo Botsio and Joe Appiah also travel to study in England
- 1948: The Accra Riots, caused by a dispute over veterans' pay, occur in the lead-up to the events that start the Ghanaian Independence movement and the arrest of the Big Six
- 1949: Coussey Committee is formed to enable writing the draft of a constitution for Ghanaian self-rule in the Gold Coast, leading to the formation of the Convention People's Party by Nkrumah
- 1956: British Togoland is incorporated into what is now Ghana

Ghanaian Independence

- 1957: The Dominion of Ghana becomes independent with Kwame Nkrumah as Prime Minister of Ghana and Queen Elizabeth II as Queen of Ghana.
- 1959: James Barnor travels to England in time to photograph the Swinging Sixties, having established himself at the Daily Graphic and Drum magazine
- 1963: Nana Kofi Obonyaa, born James Moxon, becomes the first white chief in Aburi
- 1967: Margaret Busby co-founds publishing company Allison & Busby, becoming the UK's first black woman book publisher
- 1970: Messages: Poems from Ghana, edited by Kofi Awoonor and G. Adali-Mortty, is published in the Heinemann African Writers Series
- 1981: Following the 31 December takeover by Jerry Rawlings, Ghana comes under military rule.
- 1987: Lynda Chalker, the British minister of state for Foreign and Commonwealth Affairs, makes a successful visit to Ghana, securing further Aid for Ghanaian economic reform from the UK
- 1991: Ozwald Boateng open his studio on London's Portobello Road, in Notting Hill
- 1992: The decentralization of Ghana occurs with a return to British policy theory of separation of central and local governmental institutions
- 1993: Ghana is readmitted to the Commonwealth
- 2002: Paul Boateng becomes the first black Cabinet Minister. Ghana Awards Music UK established
- 2007: Freema Agyeman plays Martha Jones in the BBC's Doctor Who
- 2010: Sam Gyimah is elected
- 2011: Abrantee Boateng launches his Afrobeats show over the radio
- 2017: Edward Enninful is appointed Editor-in-Chief of British Vogue, making him the only Black editor in history to head any of the 26 international Vogue titles, Nana Kofi Twumasi-Ankrah became the first black equerry for Elizabeth II
- 2018: DJ Zel at the age of 11 became the youngest DJ on UK radio at UniAfrik
- 2019: Abena Oppong-Asare and Bell Ribeiro-Addy are elected Members of Parliament

== Notable individuals ==
- Nana Richard Abiona
- David Adjaye
- Adam Afriyie
- Harry Aikines-Aryeetey
- John Akomfrah
- Adjoa Andoh
- Kwadwo Adu Genfi Amponsah
- Maxwell Owusu Ansah
- Kwame Anthony Appiah
- Amma Asante
- Bankole Awoonor-Renner
- James Bannerman
- James Barnor
- Rhian Benson
- Isaac Borquaye
- Ozwald Boateng
- Margaret Busby
- Gus Casely-Hayford
- Joe Casely-Hayford
- Margaret Casely-Hayford
- Peggy Cripps
- Kwasi Esono Danquah III
- Idris Elba
- Afua Hirsch
- Cab Kaye
- Peter Mensah
- Dylan Kwabena Mills
- Bernard Ribeiro, Baron Ribeiro
- Nana Kofi Obonyaa
- Michael Ebenezer Kwadjo Omari Owuo Jr.
- Caleb Quaye
- Reggie Yates
- Lynette Yiadom-Boakye
- Dorothy Koomson
- Mark Osei-Tutu

== List of high commissioners in United Kingdom to Ghana ==
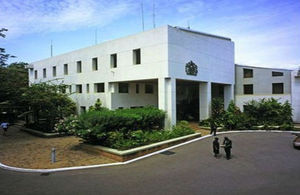
British High Commission in Accra

- 1957–1959: Sir Ian Maclennan
- 1959–1961: Sir Arthur Snelling
- 1961–1964: Sir Geoffrey de Freitas
- 1964–1966: Sir Harold Smedley
- 1967–1970: Horatio Matthews
- 1970–1975: Henry Stanley
- 1975–1978: Frank Mills
- 1978–1983: Sir James Mellon
- 1983–1986: Kevin Burns
- 1986–1989: Arthur Wyatt
- 1989–1992: Sir Anthony Goodenough
- 1992–1996: David Walker
- 1996–2000: Ian Mackley
- 2000–2004: Dr Roderick Pullen
- 2004–2007: Gordon Wetherell
- 2007–2011: Nicholas Westcott
- 2011–2014: Peter Jones
- 2014–2017: Jon Benjamin
- 2017–present: Iain Walker

== List of high commissioners in Ghana to United Kingdom ==
- Joseph Leo Seko Abbey
- James Aggrey-Orleans
- Seth Anthony
- Kwesi Armah
- Edward Asafu-Adjaye
- Kenneth Dadzie
- Kwaku Danso-Boafo
- Ebenezer Moses Debrah
- James Victor Gbeho
- Kwame Sanaa-Poku Jantuah
- Isaac Osei
- Papa Owusu-Ankomah
- Victor Emmanuel Smith

== See also ==
- Foreign relations of Ghana
- Foreign relations of the United Kingdom
- Commonwealth of Nations
- Black British people
- Black Scottish people
