= Galsworthy (surname) =

Galsworthy is a surname. Notable people with the surname include:

- Anthony Galsworthy (born 1944), British diplomat
- Arthur Galsworthy (1916–1986), British soldier and diplomat
- John Galsworthy (1867–1933), English novelist and playwright
- John Galsworthy (diplomat) (1919–1992), British diplomat
- Marilyn Galsworthy (born 1954), British actress
- Mike Galsworthy (born 1976), British scientist and activist
- Robert Galsworthy (born 1989), Australian weightlifter
