= Bosara maior =

Scientific classification
- Kingdom: Animalia
- Phylum: Arthropoda
- Class: Insecta
- Order: Lepidoptera
- Family: Geometridae
- Genus: Bosara
- Species: B. maior

Binomial name
- Bosara maior Galsworthy, 2003

Species of moth

Bosara maior or Bosara major (Note: Spelling "maior", without any explanation of the name, is used in the original description. The spelling has been corrected (?) to "major" in the Online Taxonomic Facility of Geometridae.) is a moth in the family Geometridae. It is endemic to Sri Lanka.
