= Bosara agassizi =

Scientific classification
- Kingdom: Animalia
- Phylum: Arthropoda
- Class: Insecta
- Order: Lepidoptera
- Family: Geometridae
- Genus: Bosara
- Species: B. agassizi

Binomial name
- Bosara agassizi Galsworthy, 2003

Species of moth

Bosara agassizi is a moth in the family Geometridae. It is endemic to the mainland Papua New Guinea with records from the Southern Highlands and (provisionally) Eastern Highlands Provinces at altitudes of about 1,600–1,600 m (5,200–5,300 ft) above sea level.

As with all species in the Bosara refusaria group, Bosara agassizi are small (forewing length about 6 mm (0.24 in)), brown to grey moths.
