= List of high commissioners of the United Kingdom to Malta =

The high commissioner of the United Kingdom to Malta is the United Kingdom's foremost diplomatic representative in the Republic of Malta, and head of the UK's diplomatic mission there.

As fellow members of the Commonwealth of Nations, the United Kingdom and Malta conduct their diplomatic relations at governmental level, rather than between heads of state. Therefore, they exchange high commissioners rather than ambassadors.

== High commissioners ==
- 1962–1965: Sir Edward Wakefield, Bt. (Commissioner before independence from 1962 to 1964)
- 1965–1967: Sir John Martin
- 1967–1970: Sir Geofroy Tory
- 1970–1972: Sir Duncan Watson
- 1972–1974: Sir John Moreton
- 1974–1976: Sir Robin Haydon
- 1976–1979: Norman Aspin
- 1980–1982: David Aiers
- 1982–1985: Charles Booth
- 1985–1987: Stanley Duncan
- 1988–1991: Brian Hitch
- 1991–1994: Sir Peter Wallis
- 1995–1999: Graham Archer
- 1999–2002: Howard Pearce
- 2002–2006: Sir Vincent Fean
- 2006–2008: Nicholas Archer
- 2009–2012: Louise Stanton
- 2012–2016: Robert Luke
- 2016–2020: Stuart Gill
- 2020–2025: Cathy Ward
- 2025–present: Victoria Busby
