= Bosara major =

Scientific classification
- Kingdom: Animalia
- Phylum: Arthropoda
- Class: Insecta
- Order: Lepidoptera
- Family: Geometridae
- Genus: Bosara
- Species: B. major

Binomial name
- Bosara major Galsworthy, 2003

Species of moth

Bosara major is a species of moth in the family Geometridae. It is known from Sri Lanka.

As with all species in the Bosara refusaria group, Bosara major are small (forewing length about 6 mm (0.24 in)), brown to grey moths. Only females of this species are known.
