= Bosara obliterata =

Scientific classification
- Kingdom: Animalia
- Phylum: Arthropoda
- Class: Insecta
- Order: Lepidoptera
- Family: Geometridae
- Genus: Bosara
- Species: B. obliterata

Binomial name
- Bosara obliterata Inoue, 2002

Species of moth

Bosara obliterata is a species of moth in the family Geometridae. It is known from Taiwan and Hong Kong.

The wingspan is 13–14 mm (0.51–0.55 in). It resembles Bosara emarginaria but the wings are darker.
