= Eupithecia fenita =

Scientific classification
- Kingdom: Animalia
- Phylum: Arthropoda
- Clade: Pancrustacea
- Class: Insecta
- Order: Lepidoptera
- Family: Geometridae
- Genus: Eupithecia
- Species: E. fenita

Binomial name
- Eupithecia fenita Mironov & Galsworthy, 2004

Species of moth

Eupithecia fenita is a moth in the family Geometridae. It is known from northern Yunnan in south-western China.

The wingspan is about 17 mm.
