= Eupithecia stueningi =

Scientific classification
- Kingdom: Animalia
- Phylum: Arthropoda
- Clade: Pancrustacea
- Class: Insecta
- Order: Lepidoptera
- Family: Geometridae
- Genus: Eupithecia
- Species: E. stueningi

Binomial name
- Eupithecia stueningi Mironov & Galsworthy, 2009

Species of moth

Eupithecia stueningi is a moth in the family Geometridae. It is endemic to Thailand. It is named for Dieter Stüning, German lepidopterologist.

The wingspan is about 17 mm (0.67 in). The forewings are brownish grey and the hindwings are whitish grey.
