= Eupithecia kuni =

Scientific classification
- Kingdom: Animalia
- Phylum: Arthropoda
- Clade: Pancrustacea
- Class: Insecta
- Order: Lepidoptera
- Family: Geometridae
- Genus: Eupithecia
- Species: E. kuni

Binomial name
- Eupithecia kuni Mironov & Galsworthy, 2009

Species of moth

Eupithecia kuni is a moth in the family Geometridae. It is endemic to Vietnam. It is named for András Kun, Hungarian lepidopterologist who collected the holotype.

The wingspan is about 21–21.5 mm (0.83–0.85 in) for females.
