= Eupithecia concava =

Scientific classification
- Kingdom: Animalia
- Phylum: Arthropoda
- Clade: Pancrustacea
- Class: Insecta
- Order: Lepidoptera
- Family: Geometridae
- Genus: Eupithecia
- Species: E. concava

Binomial name
- Eupithecia concava Mironov & Galsworthy, 2007

Species of moth

Eupithecia concava is a moth in the family Geometridae. It is endemic to Taiwan. It occurs at middle altitudes (1,100–1,400 m (3,600–4,600 ft) above sea level).

The wingspan is about 19–22 mm.
