= Michael Scott (diplomat) =

British diplomat and colonial administrator (1923–2004)

Sir Michael Scott KCVO CMG (19 May 1923 – 9 June 2004) was a British diplomat and colonial administrator.

Scott was educated at Dame Allan's School and then enrolled at Durham University. He was granted an emergency commission in the Durham Light Infantry in 1941 and then transferred to the British Indian Army in 1943, joining the Royal Gurkha Rifles and serving in this unit until 1947. During this time he became acquainted with the Urdu, Hindi, and Gurkhali languages.

== Career ==
He joined the Colonial Office in 1949 and moved to the Commonwealth Relations Office in 1957 (which would later merge with the Foreign Office). He was first secretary in Karachi (1958–1959); deputy high commissioner in Peshawar (1959–1962); counsellor and director, British Information Services in India, New Delhi (1963–1965); head of East and Central Africa Department (1965–1968); and then deputy high commissioner in Nicosia (1968–1972).

Scott headed three missions in his career: he was ambassador to Nepal (1974–1977); high commissioner to Malawi (1977–1979); and briefly high commissioner to Bangladesh (1980–1981). In retirement he became secretary-general of the Royal Commonwealth Society (1983–1988).

Diplomatic posts
Preceded by Terence O'Brien	British Ambassador to Nepal; 1974–1977	Succeeded by John Denson
Preceded by Kenneth Ritchie	British High Commissioner to Malawi; 1977–1979	Succeeded by William Peters
Preceded by Stephen Miles	British High Commissioner to Bangladesh; 1980-1981	Succeeded by Sir Frank Mills

== Honours ==
- Knight Commander of the Royal Victorian Order (KCVO) - 1979
- Companion of the Order of St Michael and St George (CMG) - 1977
