= Charles Booth (diplomat) =

British diplomat

Charles Leonard Booth

High Commissioner of the United Kingdom to Malta
- In office 1982–1985
- Prime Minister: Margaret Thatcher
- Preceded by: David Aiers
- Succeeded by: Stanley Duncan

List of Ambassadors of the United Kingdom to Burma
- In office 1978–1982
- Prime Minister: James Callaghan; Margaret Thatcher
- Preceded by: Terence O'Brien
- Succeeded by: Nicholas Fenn

Personal details
- Born: 7 March 1925 Heywood, England
- Died: 21 March 1997 (aged 72) Southwold, England
- Spouse: Gil Booth

Charles Leonard Booth, CMG LVO (7 March 1925 – 21 March 1997) was a British diplomat in the second half of the Twentieth century.

== Education ==
Booth was educated at Heywood Grammar School and Pembroke College, Oxford.

== Military service ==
Booth was a captain in the Royal Artillery from 1943 until 1947.

== Career ==
Booth joined Her Majesty's Diplomatic Service in 1950. He was the Third then Second Secretary in Rangoon from 1951 to 1955. He was at the Foreign Office from 1955 to 1960. He was First Secretary in Rome from 1960 to 1963; then Head of Chancery at Rangoon from 1963 to 1964, and Bangkok from 1964 to 1967. He became a Counsellor in 1968 and after that was Deputy High Commissioner in Kampala from 1969 to 1971. He was Consul-General in Washington from 1971 to 1973; Counsellor in Belgrade from 1973 to 1977; Ambassador to Burma from 1978 to 1982; and finally, High Commissioner to Malta from 1982 to 1985.

== Honours ==
He was awarded the honour of Officer of the Order of Merit of the Italian Republic in 1961. In that same year he was awarded the LVO. In 1979 he became a CMG.
