= Eupithecia flavimacula =

Scientific classification
- Kingdom: Animalia
- Phylum: Arthropoda
- Clade: Pancrustacea
- Class: Insecta
- Order: Lepidoptera
- Family: Geometridae
- Genus: Eupithecia
- Species: E. flavimacula

Binomial name
- Eupithecia flavimacula Mironov & Galsworthy, 2007

Species of moth

Eupithecia flavimacula is a moth in the family Geometridae. It is endemic to Taiwan. The holotype was collected at 1,100 m (3,600 ft) above sea level in Taoyuan.

The wingspan is about 18 mm.
