= Eupithecia amandae =

Scientific classification
- Kingdom: Animalia
- Phylum: Arthropoda
- Clade: Pancrustacea
- Class: Insecta
- Order: Lepidoptera
- Family: Geometridae
- Genus: Eupithecia
- Species: E. amandae

Binomial name
- Eupithecia amandae Galsworthy & Mironov, 2011

Species of moth

Eupithecia amandae is a moth in the family Geometridae. It is found in Yunnan, China. It is named for a certain Amanda Phillips "in commemoration of her wedding".

The wingspan is about 20–24 mm (0.79–0.94 in).
