= Eupithecia argentea =

Scientific classification
- Kingdom: Animalia
- Phylum: Arthropoda
- Clade: Pancrustacea
- Class: Insecta
- Order: Lepidoptera
- Family: Geometridae
- Genus: Eupithecia
- Species: E. argentea

Binomial name
- Eupithecia argentea Mironov & Galsworthy, 2004

Species of moth

Eupithecia argentea is a moth in the family Geometridae. It is found in south-western China (Mount Emei, Sichuan).

The wingspan is about 21 mm (holotype, a female). The fore- and hindwings are off-white.
