= Eupithecia herczigi =

Scientific classification
- Kingdom: Animalia
- Phylum: Arthropoda
- Clade: Pancrustacea
- Class: Insecta
- Order: Lepidoptera
- Family: Geometridae
- Genus: Eupithecia
- Species: E. herczigi

Binomial name
- Eupithecia herczigi Mironov & Galsworthy, 2009

Species of moth

Eupithecia herczigi is a moth in the family Geometridae. It is endemic to Thailand. It is named for Béla Herczig, Hungarian lepidopterologist who collected the holotype.

== Description ==
The wingspan is about 18–20 mm (0.71–0.79 in) for females. The forewings are dirty white with four to five brown blotches and the hindwings are dark brown.
