= Eupithecia danielena =

Scientific classification
- Kingdom: Animalia
- Phylum: Arthropoda
- Clade: Pancrustacea
- Class: Insecta
- Order: Lepidoptera
- Family: Geometridae
- Genus: Eupithecia
- Species: E. danielena

Binomial name
- Eupithecia danielena Mironov & Galsworthy, 2009

Synonyms
- Eupithecia ronkayi Mironov & Galsworthy, 2009 – preoccupied by Eupithecia ronkayi Vojnits, 1994

Species of moth

Eupithecia danielena is a moth in the family Geometridae. It is found in northern Thailand and western Myanmar.

The wingspan is about 16.5–17 mm (0.65–0.67 in).
