= Eupithecia acosmos =

Scientific classification
- Kingdom: Animalia
- Phylum: Arthropoda
- Clade: Pancrustacea
- Class: Insecta
- Order: Lepidoptera
- Family: Geometridae
- Genus: Eupithecia
- Species: E. acosmos

Binomial name
- Eupithecia acosmos Mironov, 1989

Species of geometer moth

Eupithecia acosmos is a moth in the family Geometridae. It was first described in 1989 by Vladimir Mironov and is known from Kazakhstan, Kyrgyzstan, Tajikistan and Turkmenistan. Mironov and Galsworthy place it in the russeliata species group.
