= Ian Maclennan (diplomat) =

British diplomat (1909–1986)

Sir Ian Maclennan KCMG

British High Commissioner to New Zealand
- In office 1964–1969
- Preceded by: Sir Francis Cumming-Bruce
- Succeeded by: Arthur Galsworthy

British Ambassador to Ireland
- In office 1959–1964
- Preceded by: Sir Alexander Clutterbuck
- Succeeded by: Sir Geofroy Tory

British High Commissioner to Ghana
- In office 1957–1959
- Preceded by: Post established
- Succeeded by: Sir Arthur Snelling

Personal details
- Born: 30 October 1909 Glasgow, Scotland
- Died: 25 December 1986 (aged 77)
- Children: 2
- Education: Worcester College, Oxford
- Occupation: Diplomat

Sir Ian Morrison Ross Maclennan (30 October 1909 – 25 December 1986) was a British diplomat who served as High Commissioner to Ghana, Ambassador to Ireland, and High Commissioner to New Zealand.

== Early life and education ==
Maclennan was born on 30 October 1909 in Glasgow, the son of W. Maclennan. He was educated at Hymers College, Hull, where he won a scholarship to Worcester College, Oxford, and took a first in Modern Greats.

== Career ==
Maclennan joined the Colonial Office in 1933, and in 1937 was transferred to the Dominions Office. In the following year he was posted to the UK High Commissioner's Office at Ottawa. In 1945, he was transferred to Pretoria, and then served as the first British High Commissioner to Southern Rhodesia from 1951 to 1953, and High Commissioner to the Federation of Rhodesia and Nyasaland from 1953 to 1955.

After working as an assistant under-secretary of state at the Commonwealth Relations Office from 1955 to 1957, he served as the first British High Commissioner to newly independent Ghana from 1957 to 1959. He was then Ambassador to the Republic of Ireland from 1960 to 1963, and British High Commissioner for New Zealand from 1964 until his retirement in 1969.

In retirement Maclennan was a member of the General Advisory Council of the Independent Broadcasting Authority (IBA) from 1974 to 1982 and chairman from 1979 to 1982.

== Personal life and death ==
Maclennan married Margherita Jarrett in 1936 and they had a son and a daughter.

Maclennan died on 25 December 1986, aged 77.

== Honours ==
Maclennan was appointed Companion of the Order of St Michael and St George (CMG) in the 1951 New Year Honours, and promoted to Knight Commander (KCMG) in the 1957 Birthday Honours.

== See also ==
- Ghana–United Kingdom relations
- Ireland–United Kingdom relations
- New Zealand–United Kingdom relations

Diplomatic posts
New office	British High Commissioner to Ghana; 1957–1959	Succeeded by Sir Arthur Snelling
Preceded by Sir Alexander Clutterbuck	British Ambassador to Ireland; 1959–1964	Succeeded by Sir Geofroy Tory
Preceded by Sir Francis Cumming-Bruce	British High Commissioner to New Zealand; 1964–1969	Succeeded by Arthur Galsworthy
