= Eupithecia rhadine =

Scientific classification
- Kingdom: Animalia
- Phylum: Arthropoda
- Clade: Pancrustacea
- Class: Insecta
- Order: Lepidoptera
- Family: Geometridae
- Genus: Eupithecia
- Species: E. rhadine

Binomial name
- Eupithecia rhadine Mironov & Galsworthy, 2007

Species of moth

Eupithecia rhadine is a moth in the family Geometridae. It is endemic to Taiwan. The holotype was collected at 1,950 m (6,400 ft) above sea level in Nantou.

The wingspan is about 15 mm for the holotype, a male. The fore- and hindwings are brownish grey.
