= Eupithecia magica =

Scientific classification
- Kingdom: Animalia
- Phylum: Arthropoda
- Clade: Pancrustacea
- Class: Insecta
- Order: Lepidoptera
- Family: Geometridae
- Genus: Eupithecia
- Species: E. magica

Binomial name
- Eupithecia magica Mironov & Galsworthy, 2006

Species of moth

Eupithecia magica is a moth in the family Geometridae. It is endemic to Tibet (China).

The wingspan is about 20–21 mm (0.79–0.83 in).
