= Eupithecia lupa =

Scientific classification
- Kingdom: Animalia
- Phylum: Arthropoda
- Clade: Pancrustacea
- Class: Insecta
- Order: Lepidoptera
- Family: Geometridae
- Genus: Eupithecia
- Species: E. lupa

Binomial name
- Eupithecia lupa Mironov & Galsworthy, 2007

Species of moth

Eupithecia lupa is a moth in the family Geometridae. It is endemic to Taiwan. The type series was collected at 1,950 m (6,400 ft) above sea level in Nantou.

The wingspan is about 18–19 mm.
