= Eupithecia skoui =

Scientific classification
- Kingdom: Animalia
- Phylum: Arthropoda
- Clade: Pancrustacea
- Class: Insecta
- Order: Lepidoptera
- Family: Geometridae
- Genus: Eupithecia
- Species: E. skoui

Binomial name
- Eupithecia skoui Mironov & Galsworthy, 2009

Species of moth

Eupithecia skoui is a moth in the family Geometridae. It is endemic to Thailand. It is named for Peder Skou.

The wingspan is about 20.5 millimetres (0.81 in) (holotype, a female).
