= Eupithecia pellicata =

Scientific classification
- Kingdom: Animalia
- Phylum: Arthropoda
- Clade: Pancrustacea
- Class: Insecta
- Order: Lepidoptera
- Family: Geometridae
- Genus: Eupithecia
- Species: E. pellicata

Binomial name
- Eupithecia pellicata Mironov & Galsworthy, 2007

Species of moth

Eupithecia pellicata is a moth in the family Geometridae. It is endemic to Taiwan. The holotype was collected in Nantou.

The wingspan is 24 mm for the holotype, a male.
