= Eupithecia phantastica =

Scientific classification
- Kingdom: Animalia
- Phylum: Arthropoda
- Clade: Pancrustacea
- Class: Insecta
- Order: Lepidoptera
- Family: Geometridae
- Genus: Eupithecia
- Species: E. phantastica

Binomial name
- Eupithecia phantastica Mironov & Galsworthy, 2006

Species of moth

Eupithecia phantastica is a moth in the family Geometridae. It is found in Zhejiang in Eastern China and in Taiwan.

The wingspan is about 21–22 mm (0.83–0.87 in). The forewings are pale brown and the hindwings are whitish grey.
