= Bosara corrobusta =

Scientific classification
- Kingdom: Animalia
- Phylum: Arthropoda
- Class: Insecta
- Order: Lepidoptera
- Family: Geometridae
- Genus: Bosara
- Species: B. corrobusta

Binomial name
- Bosara corrobusta Inoue, 2002

Species of moth

Bosara corrobusta is a species of moth in the family Geometridae. It is endemic to Taiwan and known from Kaohsiung.

The wingspan is 13 mm (0.51 in). It is similar to Bosara subrobusta but darker and with differences in both male and female genitalia.
