= Eupithecia burmata =

Scientific classification
- Kingdom: Animalia
- Phylum: Arthropoda
- Clade: Pancrustacea
- Class: Insecta
- Order: Lepidoptera
- Family: Geometridae
- Genus: Eupithecia
- Species: E. burmata

Binomial name
- Eupithecia burmata Mironov & Galsworthy, 2009

Species of moth

Eupithecia burmata is a moth in the family Geometridae. It is endemic to Myanmar.

The wingspan is about 24 mm (0.94 in) (holotype, a female).
