= Eupithecia laoica =

Scientific classification
- Kingdom: Animalia
- Phylum: Arthropoda
- Clade: Pancrustacea
- Class: Insecta
- Order: Lepidoptera
- Family: Geometridae
- Genus: Eupithecia
- Species: E. laoica

Binomial name
- Eupithecia laoica Mironov & Galsworthy, 2009

Species of moth

Eupithecia laoica is a moth in the family Geometridae. It is endemic to Laos.

The wingspan is about 17.5–20 mm (0.69–0.79 in) for males. The fore- and hindwings are dingy brown.
