= List of high commissioners of the United Kingdom to Bangladesh =

His Majesty’s High Commissioner to Bangladesh
- Royal arms of His Majesty's Government
- Incumbent; Sarah Cooke since 13 July, 2026
- Foreign, Commonwealth and Development Office
- Style: Her Excellency; Ambassador
- Reports to: Secretary of State for Foreign, Commonwealth and Development Affairs
- Residence: Dhaka, Bangladesh
- Seat: High Commission of the United Kingdom, Dhaka
- Appointer: The Crown on advice of the prime minister
- Term length: At His Majesty's pleasure
- Inaugural holder: Anthony Golds
- Formation: 4 February 1972; 54 years ago
- Website: Official website

Countries belonging to the Commonwealth of Nations typically exchange high commissioners, rather than ambassadors. Though there are a few technical and historical differences, they are now in practice the same office. The following persons have served as British high commissioners to the People's Republic of Bangladesh.

== List of high commissioners ==
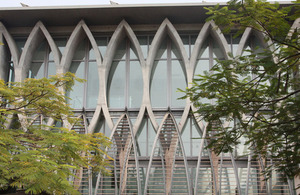
British High Commission in Dhaka

- 1972–1975: Anthony Golds
- 1975–1978: Barry Smallman
- 1978–1980: Stephen Miles
- 1980–1981: Sir Michael Scott
- 1981–1983: Sir Frank Mills
- 1983–1989: Sir Terence Streeton
- 1989–1993: Sir Colin Imray
- 1993–1996: Peter Fowler
- 1996–2000: David Walker
- 2000–2004: David Carter
- 2004–2008: Anwar Choudhury
- 2008–2011: Stephen Evans
- 2011–2015: Robert Gibson
- 2016–2019: Alison Blake
- 2019–2023: Robert Chatterton Dickson
- 2023–present: Sarah Cooke
