= Eupithecia tectaria =

Scientific classification
- Kingdom: Animalia
- Phylum: Arthropoda
- Clade: Pancrustacea
- Class: Insecta
- Order: Lepidoptera
- Family: Geometridae
- Genus: Eupithecia
- Species: E. tectaria

Binomial name
- Eupithecia tectaria Mironov & Galsworthy, 2011

Species of moth

Eupithecia tectaria is a moth in the family Geometridae. It is found in Fujian, China.

== Description ==
A large species with a wingspan of 24 mm (0.94 in) and a forewing of 12 mm (0.47 in). The labial palpi are covered with dark brown scales. The adults have an ash-grey head and thorax, with pale brown wings that have a small black dot on the forewing and a dark brown dot on the hind wing.
