= List of high commissioners of the United Kingdom to Ghana =

High Commissioner of the United Kingdom to Ghana
- Coat of arms of the United Kingdom
- Incumbent; Christian Rogg since 2025
- Style: His Excellency
- Residence: Osu Link, Gamel Abdul Nasser Avenue
- Seat: Ghana
- Nominator: Prime Minister of the United Kingdom
- Appointer: Secretary of State for Foreign, Commonwealth and Development Affairs
- Inaugural holder: Sir Ian Maclennan
- Formation: 1957
- Website: British High Commission – Ghana

The high commissioner of the United Kingdom to Ghana is the United Kingdom's foremost diplomatic representative in the Republic of Ghana, and head of the UK's diplomatic mission in Ghana.

As fellow members of the Commonwealth of Nations, the United Kingdom and Ghana conduct their diplomatic relations at governmental level, rather than between heads of state. Therefore, the countries exchange high commissioners, rather than ambassadors.

== List of heads of mission ==
=== High commissioners to Ghana ===
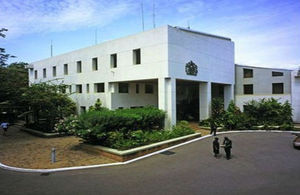
British High Commission in Accra

- 1957–1959: Sir Ian Maclennan
- 1959–1961: Sir Arthur Snelling
- 1961–1964: Sir Geoffrey de Freitas
- 1964–1966: Sir Harold Smedley
- 1967–1970: Horatio Matthews
- 1970–1975: Henry Stanley
- 1975–1978: Frank Mills
- 1978–1983: Sir James Mellon
- 1983–1986: Kevin Burns
- 1986–1989: Arthur Wyatt
- 1989–1992: Sir Anthony Goodenough
- 1992–1996: David Walker
- 1996–2000: Ian Mackley
- 2000–2004: Dr Roderick Pullen
- 2004–2007: Gordon Wetherell
- 2007–2011: Nicholas Westcott
- 2011–2014: Peter Jones
- 2014–2017: Jon Benjamin
- 2017–2021: Iain Walker
- 2021–2025: Harriet Thompson
- 2025–present: Christian Rogg
