= Eupithecia qinlingata =

Scientific classification
- Kingdom: Animalia
- Phylum: Arthropoda
- Clade: Pancrustacea
- Class: Insecta
- Order: Lepidoptera
- Family: Geometridae
- Genus: Eupithecia
- Species: E. qinlingata

Binomial name
- Eupithecia qinlingata Mironov & Galsworthy, 2011

Species of moth

Eupithecia qinlingata is a moth in the family Geometridae. It is found in the eponymous Qinling range in Shaanxi, China.

The wingspan is 18 mm (0.71 in) for the holotype, a male.
