= Eupithecia blandula =

Scientific classification
- Kingdom: Animalia
- Phylum: Arthropoda
- Clade: Pancrustacea
- Class: Insecta
- Order: Lepidoptera
- Family: Geometridae
- Genus: Eupithecia
- Species: E. blandula

Binomial name
- Eupithecia blandula Mironov & Galsworthy, 2007

Species of moth

Eupithecia blandula is a moth in the family Geometridae. It is endemic to Taiwan. It occurs at high elevations (2,200–2,760 m (7,220–9,060 ft) above sea level).

The wingspan is about 19–21 mm.
