= David Carter (diplomat) =

British diplomat (born 1945)

David Carter (born 4 May 1945) is a British former diplomat and academic. He served as British High Commissioner to Bangladesh from 2000 to 2004 and later as bursar of Lucy Cavendish College, Cambridge.

== Early life and education ==
Carter was brought up in Zambia. He graduated from the University of Wales and received a PhD in social sciences from Durham University in 1978. During his time in Durham he was a member of Hatfield College.

== Career ==
Carter joined the Research Department of the Foreign and Commonwealth Office (FCO) in 1970. He was posted as second secretary in Accra in 1971, returning to the FCO in 1975. His next posting was as first secretary and head of chancery in Manila in 1980. He returned to the FCO in 1983 and was appointed South Africa desk officer in the Southern African Department. In 1986, he was posted to Lusaka as deputy high commissioner and head of chancery. He was in South Africa as deputy ambassador during the transition to democracy, and later served in India as deputy high commissioner. He was appointed High Commissioner to Bangladesh from 2000 to 2004.

Carter returned to academia in 2005 as deputy director of the Centre for Studies in Security and Diplomacy at the University of Birmingham. He moved to Lucy Cavendish College, Cambridge as Bursar in July 2006. He retired from this role in 2010, and was appointed an emeritus fellow of Lucy Cavendish College in October 2019 — he was the first man to receive this honour from the formerly all-female college.

== Personal life ==
He is a member of the Royal Over-Seas League and a volunteer with the homelessness charity Crisis.

Diplomatic posts
Preceded by David Walker	British High Commissioner to Bangladesh; 2000–2004	Succeeded by Anwar Choudhury
