= Eupithecia lamata =

Scientific classification
- Kingdom: Animalia
- Phylum: Arthropoda
- Clade: Pancrustacea
- Class: Insecta
- Order: Lepidoptera
- Family: Geometridae
- Genus: Eupithecia
- Species: E. lamata

Binomial name
- Eupithecia lamata Mironov & Galsworthy, 2004

Species of moth

Eupithecia lamata is a moth in the family Geometridae. It is known from Qinghai, western China.

The wingspan is about 19 mm in females.
