= Eupithecia hreblayi =

Scientific classification
- Kingdom: Animalia
- Phylum: Arthropoda
- Clade: Pancrustacea
- Class: Insecta
- Order: Lepidoptera
- Family: Geometridae
- Genus: Eupithecia
- Species: E. hreblayi

Binomial name
- Eupithecia hreblayi Mironov & Galsworthy, 2009

Species of moth

Eupithecia hreblayi is a moth in the family Geometridae. It is endemic to Thailand. It is named for Márton Hreblay, Hungarian lepidopterologist.

The wingspan is about 18–19 mm (0.71–0.75 in) for females.
