= Eupithecia macrodisca =

Scientific classification
- Kingdom: Animalia
- Phylum: Arthropoda
- Clade: Pancrustacea
- Class: Insecta
- Order: Lepidoptera
- Family: Geometridae
- Genus: Eupithecia
- Species: E. macrodisca

Binomial name
- Eupithecia macrodisca Mironov & Galsworthy, 2009

Species of moth

Eupithecia macrodisca is a moth in the family Geometridae It is endemic to Thailand.

The wingspan is about 18.5 millimetres (0.73 in) for males.
