= Bosara torquibursa =

Scientific classification
- Kingdom: Animalia
- Phylum: Arthropoda
- Class: Insecta
- Order: Lepidoptera
- Family: Geometridae
- Genus: Bosara
- Species: B. torquibursa

Binomial name
- Bosara torquibursa Galsworthy, 2003

Species of moth

Bosara torquibursa is a moth in the family Geometridae. It is endemic to Papua New Guinea and known from Goodenough Island; its range probably extends into the nearby southeasternmost New Guinea.
