= Eupithecia villica =

Scientific classification
- Kingdom: Animalia
- Phylum: Arthropoda
- Clade: Pancrustacea
- Class: Insecta
- Order: Lepidoptera
- Family: Geometridae
- Genus: Eupithecia
- Species: E. villica

Binomial name
- Eupithecia villica Mironov & Galsworthy, 2006

Species of moth

Eupithecia villica is a moth in the family Geometridae. It is endemic to Southwestern China (Tibet and Yunnan).

The wingspan is about 17–19 mm (0.67–0.75 in).
