= Bosara janae =

Scientific classification
- Kingdom: Animalia
- Phylum: Arthropoda
- Clade: Pancrustacea
- Class: Insecta
- Order: Lepidoptera
- Family: Geometridae
- Genus: Bosara
- Species: B. janae

Binomial name
- Bosara janae Galsworthy, 1999

Species of moth

Bosara janae is a moth in the family Geometridae. It is found on Sulawesi, with records from 460–820 m (1,500–2,700 ft) above sea level.

The length of the forewings is about 9 mm for males. The ground colour is greyish.

== Etymology ==
The species is named in honour of the wife of the author.
