= Eupithecia hainanensis =

Scientific classification
- Kingdom: Animalia
- Phylum: Arthropoda
- Clade: Pancrustacea
- Class: Insecta
- Order: Lepidoptera
- Family: Geometridae
- Genus: Eupithecia
- Species: E. hainanensis

Binomial name
- Eupithecia hainanensis Mironov & Galsworthy, 2004

Species of moth

Eupithecia hainanensis is a moth in the family Geometridae. It is known from Hainan (China) and Thailand.

The wingspan is about 18–22 mm. The fore- and hindwings are pale brown.
