= Eupithecia thaica =

Scientific classification
- Kingdom: Animalia
- Phylum: Arthropoda
- Clade: Pancrustacea
- Class: Insecta
- Order: Lepidoptera
- Family: Geometridae
- Genus: Eupithecia
- Species: E. thaica

Binomial name
- Eupithecia thaica Mironov & Galsworthy, 2009

Species of moth

Eupithecia thaica is a moth in the family Geometridae. It is endemic to Thailand.

The wingspan is about 24 millimetres (0.94 in) (holotype, a male). The forewings are brownish ochreous and the hindwings are pale yellowish white.
