= Eupithecia hoenehermanni =

Scientific classification
- Kingdom: Animalia
- Phylum: Arthropoda
- Clade: Pancrustacea
- Class: Insecta
- Order: Lepidoptera
- Family: Geometridae
- Genus: Eupithecia
- Species: E. hoenehermanni

Binomial name
- Eupithecia hoenehermanni Mironov & Galsworthy, 2011

Species of moth

Eupithecia hoenehermanni is a moth in the family Geometridae. It is found in Yunnan, China. It is named for Hermann Höne, German entomologist who collected many of the types in 1936–1937.

The wingspan is about 21–21.5 mm (0.83–0.85 in).
