= Bosara kadooriensis =

Scientific classification
- Domain: Eukaryota
- Kingdom: Animalia
- Phylum: Arthropoda
- Class: Insecta
- Order: Lepidoptera
- Family: Geometridae
- Genus: Bosara
- Species: B. kadooriensis

Binomial name
- Bosara kadooriensis Galsworthy, 2003

Species of moth

Bosara kadooriensis is a moth in the family Geometridae. It is known from Hong Kong, Taiwan, and the Ryukyu Islands (Japan), and its range most like extends into mainland China, Peninsular Malaysia, and Sri Lanka. The holotype was collected at the eponymous Kadoorie Farm and Botanic Garden.
