= Eupithecia schnitzleri =

Scientific classification
- Kingdom: Animalia
- Phylum: Arthropoda
- Clade: Pancrustacea
- Class: Insecta
- Order: Lepidoptera
- Family: Geometridae
- Genus: Eupithecia
- Species: E. schnitzleri

Binomial name
- Eupithecia schnitzleri Mironov & Galsworthy, 2009

Species of moth

Eupithecia schnitzleri is a moth in the family Geometridae. It is endemic to Thailand. It is named for Hermann Schnitzler, German lepidopterologist.

The wingspan is about 14–18 mm (0.55–0.71 in). The forewings are ash grey with a brownish tinge and the hindwings are clear white.
