= Eupithecia szaboi =

Scientific classification
- Kingdom: Animalia
- Phylum: Arthropoda
- Clade: Pancrustacea
- Class: Insecta
- Order: Lepidoptera
- Family: Geometridae
- Genus: Eupithecia
- Species: E. szaboi

Binomial name
- Eupithecia szaboi Mironov & Galsworthy, 2009

Species of moth

Eupithecia szaboi is a moth in the family Geometridae. It is endemic to Thailand. It is named for Attila Szabó, Hungarian lepidopterologist who collected the holotype.

The wingspan is about 22 millimetres (0.87 in) (holotype, a female).
