= Eupithecia viata =

Scientific classification
- Kingdom: Animalia
- Phylum: Arthropoda
- Clade: Pancrustacea
- Class: Insecta
- Order: Lepidoptera
- Family: Geometridae
- Genus: Eupithecia
- Species: E. viata

Binomial name
- Eupithecia viata Mironov & Galsworthy, 2004

Species of moth

Eupithecia viata is a moth in the family Geometridae. It is found in Gansu, western China.

The wingspan is about 21 mm for males.
