= Eupithecia lini =

Scientific classification
- Kingdom: Animalia
- Phylum: Arthropoda
- Clade: Pancrustacea
- Class: Insecta
- Order: Lepidoptera
- Family: Geometridae
- Genus: Eupithecia
- Species: E. lini

Binomial name
- Eupithecia lini Mironov & Galsworthy, 2007

Species of moth

Eupithecia lini is a moth in the family Geometridae. It is endemic to Taiwan.

The wingspan is about 29–30 mm in males. The forewings are pale ash grey and the hindwings are white.
