= Eupithecia peregovitsi =

Scientific classification
- Kingdom: Animalia
- Phylum: Arthropoda
- Clade: Pancrustacea
- Class: Insecta
- Order: Lepidoptera
- Family: Geometridae
- Genus: Eupithecia
- Species: E. peregovitsi

Binomial name
- Eupithecia peregovitsi Mironov & Galsworthy, 2009

Species of moth

Eupithecia peregovitsi is a moth in the family Geometridae. It is endemic to Vietnam. It is named for László Peregovits, Hungarian lepidopterologist who collected the holotype.

The wingspan is about 25–26 mm (0.98–1.02 in). The forewings are pale brown and the hindwings are white.
