= Eupithecia verprota =

Scientific classification
- Kingdom: Animalia
- Phylum: Arthropoda
- Clade: Pancrustacea
- Class: Insecta
- Order: Lepidoptera
- Family: Geometridae
- Genus: Eupithecia
- Species: E. verprota

Binomial name
- Eupithecia verprota Mironov & Galsworthy, 2006

Species of moth

Eupithecia verprota is a moth in the family Geometridae. It is endemic to central China (Shaanxi).

The wingspan is about 20–23 mm (0.79–0.91 in).
