= Eupithecia tropicata =

Scientific classification
- Kingdom: Animalia
- Phylum: Arthropoda
- Clade: Pancrustacea
- Class: Insecta
- Order: Lepidoptera
- Family: Geometridae
- Genus: Eupithecia
- Species: E. tropicata

Binomial name
- Eupithecia tropicata Mironov & Galsworthy, 2009

Species of moth

Eupithecia tropicata is a moth in the family Geometridae. It is endemic to Thailand.

The wingspan is about 18 millimetres (0.71 in) (holotype, a male).
