= Eupithecia swanni =

Scientific classification
- Kingdom: Animalia
- Phylum: Arthropoda
- Clade: Pancrustacea
- Class: Insecta
- Order: Lepidoptera
- Family: Geometridae
- Genus: Eupithecia
- Species: E. swanni

Binomial name
- Eupithecia swanni Mironov & Galsworthy, 2009

Species of moth

Eupithecia swanni is a moth in the family Geometridae. It is endemic to Myanmar. It is named for Captain A. E. Swann who collected the holotype in 1923.

The wingspan is about 25.5 mm (1.00 in) (holotype, a female). The forewings are pale brown.
