= Eupithecia alexiae =

Scientific classification
- Kingdom: Animalia
- Phylum: Arthropoda
- Clade: Pancrustacea
- Class: Insecta
- Order: Lepidoptera
- Family: Geometridae
- Genus: Eupithecia
- Species: E. alexiae

Binomial name
- Eupithecia alexiae Mironov & Galsworthy, 2008

Species of moth

Eupithecia alexiae is a moth in the family Geometridae. It is known from Gulmarg, Kashmir (India). It is named after granddaughter of one of the authors.

The wingspan is about 19 mm (holotype, a male). The fore- and hindwings are warm brown.
