= Eupithecia blenna =

Scientific classification
- Kingdom: Animalia
- Phylum: Arthropoda
- Clade: Pancrustacea
- Class: Insecta
- Order: Lepidoptera
- Family: Geometridae
- Genus: Eupithecia
- Species: E. blenna

Binomial name
- Eupithecia blenna Mironov & Galsworthy, 2006

Species of moth

Eupithecia blenna is a moth in the family Geometridae. It is endemic to central China (Sichuan and Shaanxi).

The wingspan is about 22.5–24 mm (0.89–0.94 in).
