= Bosara modesta =

Scientific classification
- Kingdom: Animalia
- Phylum: Arthropoda
- Class: Insecta
- Order: Lepidoptera
- Family: Geometridae
- Genus: Bosara
- Species: B. modesta

Binomial name
- Bosara modesta (Warren, 1893)

Synonyms
- Calluga modesta Warren, 1893

Species of moth

Bosara modesta is a moth in the family Geometridae first described by William Warren in 1893. It is found in the north-eastern Himalayas and on Java.
