= Bosara callinda =

Scientific classification
- Kingdom: Animalia
- Phylum: Arthropoda
- Clade: Pancrustacea
- Class: Insecta
- Order: Lepidoptera
- Family: Geometridae
- Genus: Bosara
- Species: B. callinda

Binomial name
- Bosara callinda (Holloway, 1979)

Synonyms
- Chloroclystis callinda Holloway, 1979

Species of moth

Bosara callinda is a moth in the family Geometridae. It is found in New Caledonia.
