= Bosara montana =

Scientific classification
- Kingdom: Animalia
- Phylum: Arthropoda
- Class: Insecta
- Order: Lepidoptera
- Family: Geometridae
- Genus: Bosara
- Species: B. montana

Binomial name
- Bosara montana Orhant, 2003

Species of moth

Bosara montana is a moth in the family Geometridae that is endemic to Tahiti.
