= Bosara maculilinea =

Scientific classification
- Kingdom: Animalia
- Phylum: Arthropoda
- Class: Insecta
- Order: Lepidoptera
- Family: Geometridae
- Genus: Bosara
- Species: B. maculilinea

Binomial name
- Bosara maculilinea (Warren, 1898)

Synonyms
- Pasiphilodes maculilinea Warren, 1898; Gymnoscelis maculilinea (Warren, 1898)

Species of moth

Bosara maculilinea is a moth in the family Geometridae. It is found on the Key islands (Indonesia).
