= Bosara dilatata =

Scientific classification
- Kingdom: Animalia
- Phylum: Arthropoda
- Class: Insecta
- Order: Lepidoptera
- Family: Geometridae
- Genus: Bosara
- Species: B. dilatata

Binomial name
- Bosara dilatata Walker, 1866

Synonyms
- Bosara pelopsaria Walker, 1866; Chloroclystis dilatata hydrographica Prout, 1958

Species of moth

Bosara dilatata is a moth in the family Geometridae. It is found on Borneo, Peninsular Malaysia, Sulawesi and on New Guinea.

== Subspecies ==
- Bosara dilatata dilatata (Borneo, Peninsular Malaysia)
- Bosara dilatata pelopsaria Walker, 1866 (Sulawesi)
- Bosara dilatata hydrographica (Prout, 1958) (New Guinea)
