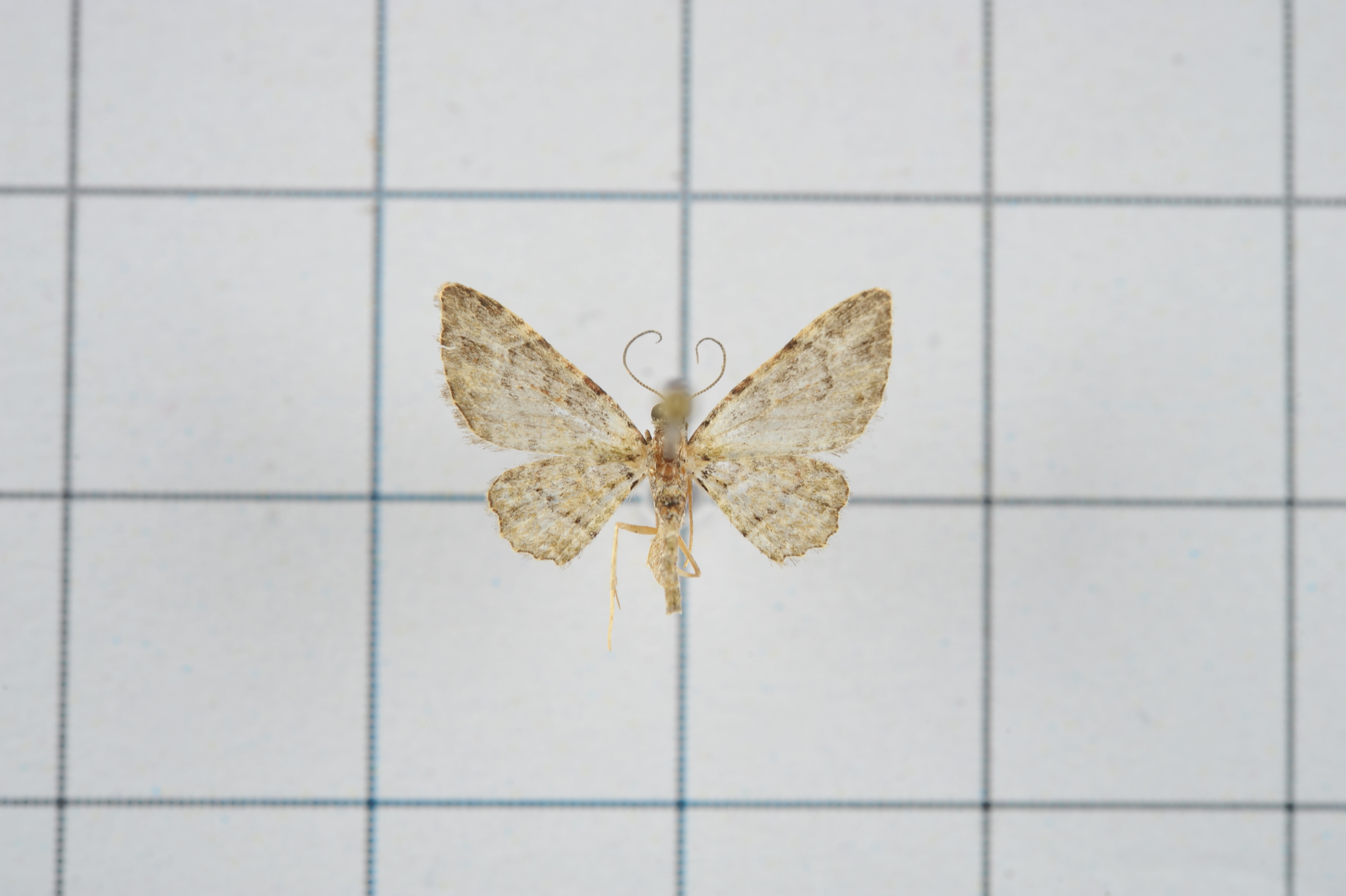

Scientific classification
- Kingdom: Animalia
- Phylum: Arthropoda
- Clade: Pancrustacea
- Class: Insecta
- Order: Lepidoptera
- Family: Geometridae
- Genus: Bosara
- Species: B. errabunda

Binomial name
- Bosara errabunda (Prout, 1958)

Synonyms
- Chloroclystis errabunda Prout, 1958; Chloroclystis infusata errabunda Prout, 1958

= Bosara errabunda =

Species of moth

Bosara errabunda is a moth in the family Geometridae. It is found in Taiwan, Hong Kong, and Hainan (southern China).
