= Brian Hitch =

British diplomat

Brian Hitch CMG (2 June 1932 – 3 August 2004) was a British diplomat, academic, and musician who was High Commissioner to Malta between 1988 and 1991. Born in Wisbech, where his father was a cobbler, he attended Wisbech Grammar School, where he attained the Holmes Scholarship to Magdalene College, Cambridge. After national service in the RAF, he joined the Foreign Office in 1955 and held positions in Japan, Cuba (during the Cuban Missile Crisis), Greece, Tokyo (as Head of Chancery), as Counsellor in Bonn and in Algiers, Consul-General in Munich, Minister in Tokyo and finally, from 1988 to 1991, as High Commissioner to Malta. Following his retirement, he directed the Diploma in European Studies at the University of Oxford and was later made a fellow at Kellogg College, Oxford. Hitch died in Oxford in 2004.
