= Bosara longipecten =

Scientific classification
- Kingdom: Animalia
- Phylum: Arthropoda
- Clade: Pancrustacea
- Class: Insecta
- Order: Lepidoptera
- Family: Geometridae
- Genus: Bosara
- Species: B. longipecten

Binomial name
- Bosara longipecten Holloway, 1997

Species of moth

Bosara longipecten is a moth in the family Geometridae. It is found on Borneo. The habitat consists of areas at altitudes between 1,500 and 2,600 meters.

The length of the forewings is 7–8 mm.
