= Ian Mackley =

British diplomat (1942–2014)

Ian Mackley

Ian Warren Mackley CMG CVO (31 March 1942 – 2 January 2014) was a British diplomat.

Mackley was educated at Ardingly College. He was British Chargé d'Affaires to Afghanistan between 1987 and 1989, and went on to serve as British High Commissioner to Ghana between 1996 and 2000 where he concurrently served as non-resident ambassadors to Togo. He featured in a satirical cartoon strip by Steve Bell in The Guardian when the British mission withdrew from Afghanistan at the time of the Taliban takeover. After retiring from the FCO in 2001, he served as a clerk in the House of Lords.

== Honours ==
- Companion of the Order of St Michael and St George (CMG) – 1989
- Commander of the Royal Victorian Order (CVO) – 1999

Diplomatic posts
Preceded by Charles Drace-Francis	British Chargé d'Affaires to Afghanistan; 1987–1989	Succeeded by No representation
Preceded by David Walker	British High Commissioner to Ghana; 1996–2000	Succeeded by Dr Roderick Pullen
