= Bosara bursacristata =

Scientific classification
- Kingdom: Animalia
- Phylum: Arthropoda
- Clade: Pancrustacea
- Class: Insecta
- Order: Lepidoptera
- Family: Geometridae
- Genus: Bosara
- Species: B. bursacristata

Binomial name
- Bosara bursacristata Holloway, 1997

Species of moth

Bosara bursacristata is a moth in the family Geometridae. It is found on Borneo. The habitat consists of lower and upper montane zones at altitudes between 1,000 and 2,110 meters.

The length of the forewings is 7–8 mm.
