= Bosara epilopha =

Scientific classification
- Kingdom: Animalia
- Phylum: Arthropoda
- Class: Insecta
- Order: Lepidoptera
- Family: Geometridae
- Genus: Bosara
- Species: B. epilopha

Binomial name
- Bosara epilopha (Turner, 1907)

Synonyms
- Chloroclystis epilopha Turner, 1907

Species of moth

Bosara epilopha is a moth in the family Geometridae. It is found in Queensland.
