= Bosara festivata =

Scientific classification
- Kingdom: Animalia
- Phylum: Arthropoda
- Clade: Pancrustacea
- Class: Insecta
- Order: Lepidoptera
- Family: Geometridae
- Genus: Bosara
- Species: B. festivata

Binomial name
- Bosara festivata (Warren, 1903)

Synonyms
- Gullaca festivata Warren, 1903

Species of moth

Bosara festivata is a moth in the family Geometridae. It is found on Sulawesi, Seram, Bali and Borneo.

Adults have pale orange-brown wings.
