= Bosara albitornalis =

Scientific classification
- Kingdom: Animalia
- Phylum: Arthropoda
- Clade: Pancrustacea
- Class: Insecta
- Order: Lepidoptera
- Family: Geometridae
- Genus: Bosara
- Species: B. albitornalis

Binomial name
- Bosara albitornalis (Prout, 1958)

Synonyms
- Chloroclystis albitornalis Prout, 1958; Axinoptera albitornalis

Species of moth

Bosara albitornalis is a moth in the family Geometridae. It is found in southern India and Sri Lanka.
