= Duncan Watson (diplomat) =

British diplomat (1915–1999)

Sir Duncan Watson KCMG

British High Commissioner to Malta
- In office 1970–1972
- Preceded by: Sir Geofroy Tory
- Succeeded by: Sir John Moreton

Personal details
- Born: 16 December 1915 Bradford
- Died: 8 July 1999 (aged 83)
- Education: New College, Oxford
- Occupation: Diplomat, colonial administrator and civil servant

Sir Noel Duncan Watson (16 December 1915 – 8 July 1999) was a British civil servant and diplomat.

== Early life and education ==
Watson was born on 16 December 1915 in Bradford, Yorkshire, the son of Harry and Mary Noel Watson. He was educated at Bradford Grammar School and New College, Oxford where he took a degree in Classics.

== Career ==
Watson entered the Colonial Service and went to Cyprus where he served as an administrative officer from 1938 to 1943. In the following year, he was appointed assistant colonial secretary in Trinidad, remaining in the post until 1945 when he was seconded to the Colonial Office.

In 1947, Watson transferred to the Home Civil Service and for three years was Principal Private Secretary to the Colonial Secretary. He served for twelve years at the Colonial Office, first as head of the social services department from 1950 to 1955 overseeing social policy in the colonies preparing for independence; then as head of its intelligence and security department from 1955 to 1960 reporting on insurgencies including the Mau Mau rebellion in Kenya and Malayan Emergency; and then as head of the Central Africa and Aden department from 1960 to 1962 where he was involved in negotiations over the future status of Rhodesia made especially complex by Ian Smith's Unilateral Declaration of Independence. Promoted to the post of assistant Under-Secretary for Commonwealth Relations and Affairs for Central Africa, where he remained from 1964 to 1967, he continued to be involved in the Rhodesia question and led the British delegation in negotiations in London and Salisbury.

Having impressed the British Prime Minister Harold Wilson during the Rhodesia talks, Wilson personally selected Watson in 1967 for the post of political adviser to the Commander-in-Chief of the Far East Command based in Singapore where he oversaw arrangements for the withdrawal of British forces from Singapore and neighbouring countries.

From 1970 to 1972, he served as British High Commissioner to Malta when Britain was faced with demands from Dom Mintoff who was threatening to expel Britain and Nato from the strategically important island unless payments were increased for maintenance of bases there. According to The Times, "As High Commissioner and negotiator par excellence, Watson was at the heart of the crisis, and his skill and diplomacy were very largely responsible for an agreement reached in 1972". Britain agreed to pay half of Nato's rent for the bases for a further seven years and the allies promised financial aid to Malta's economy. Watson then returned in 1972 to the Foreign and Commonwealth Office where he held the position of Deputy Under-Secretary for Foreign and Commonwealth Affairs responsible for Britain's remaining colonies, his final post before he retired in 1975.

In retirement, Watson was for many years a member of the central council of the Royal Commonwealth Society, and for four years its deputy chairman.

== Personal life and death ==
Watson married Aileen Bryans Bell in 1951. She died in 1980.

Watson died on 8 July 1999, aged 83.

== Honours ==
Watson was appointed Companion of the Order of St Michael and St George (CMG) in the 1960 New Year Honours, and promoted to Knight Commander (KCMG) in the 1967 Birthday Honours.

== See also ==
- Malta–United Kingdom relations

Diplomatic posts
Preceded by Sir Geofroy Tory	British High Commissioner to Malta; 1970–1972	Succeeded by Sir John Moreton
