= Bosara porphyrea =

Scientific classification
- Kingdom: Animalia
- Phylum: Arthropoda
- Class: Insecta
- Order: Lepidoptera
- Family: Geometridae
- Genus: Bosara
- Species: B. porphyrea

Binomial name
- Bosara porphyrea Inoue, 2002

Species of moth

Bosara porphyrea is a species of moth in the family Geometridae. It is endemic to Taiwan and known from 1,600 m (5,200 ft) above sea level in Fenqihu, Chiayi County.

The wingspan is 15 mm (0.59 in) for the holotype, a male. The wings are reddish brown, the hindwings darker than the forewings.
