= Bosara exortiva =

Scientific classification
- Kingdom: Animalia
- Phylum: Arthropoda
- Clade: Pancrustacea
- Class: Insecta
- Order: Lepidoptera
- Family: Geometridae
- Genus: Bosara
- Species: B. exortiva

Binomial name
- Bosara exortiva (Prout, 1958)

Synonyms
- Chloroclystis exortiva Prout, 1958; Axinoptera exortiva

Species of moth

Bosara exortiva is a moth in the family Geometridae. It is found on Rook Island, Rossel Island and New Guinea.
