= Bosara reductata =

Scientific classification
- Kingdom: Animalia
- Phylum: Arthropoda
- Clade: Pancrustacea
- Class: Insecta
- Order: Lepidoptera
- Family: Geometridae
- Genus: Bosara
- Species: B. reductata

Binomial name
- Bosara reductata Holloway, 1997

Species of moth

Bosara reductata is a moth in the family Geometridae. It is found on Borneo and possibly Peninsular Malaysia. The habitat consists of upper montane forests.

The length of the forewings is 5–6 mm.
