= Bosara atypha =

Scientific classification
- Kingdom: Animalia
- Phylum: Arthropoda
- Clade: Pancrustacea
- Class: Insecta
- Order: Lepidoptera
- Family: Geometridae
- Genus: Bosara
- Species: B. atypha

Binomial name
- Bosara atypha (Prout, 1958)

Synonyms
- Chloroclystis atypha Prout, 1958

Species of moth

Bosara atypha is a moth in the family Geometridae. It is found on Sulawesi.
