= Norman Aspin =

British diplomat

British High Commissioner to Malta
- In office 1976–1979

Personal details
- Born: 11 November 1922 Lancashire
- Died: 25 July 2011 (aged 88) Dacre, Cumbria
- Education: St John's College, Durham University

Norman Aspin CMG (11 November 1922 – 25 July 2011) was a British diplomat who served as British High Commissioner to Malta from 1976 to 1979 and oversaw the transition of Rhodesia into the modern day state of Zimbabwe.

== Early life ==
Norman Aspin was born in Lancashire. He was educated at Darwen Grammar School, and initially read Theology at Durham University in 1940, although his studies were put in abeyance owing to service as a lieutenant in the Royal Navy during the Second World War. Upon Aspin's return to Durham, he switched to reading Geography and graduated in 1947. From there he spent one year working as a Demonstrator in the Geography Department.

== Career ==
Aspin began his career at the Commonwealth Relations Office in 1948. His first overseas posting was to India, where he served until 1951. After returning to a more senior role in the Commonwealth Relations Office for a further two years, he was posted to the Federation of Rhodesia and Nyasaland from 1954 to 1957. This was followed by two years based at HM Treasury.

Aspin became the deputy to the High Commissioner to Sierra Leone in 1961 and later became the deputy to the Ambassador to Israel during which time he was awarded the CMG for his role in the Six-Day War. He worked at the Imperial Defence College after his tenure in Israel. Aspin was appointed British High Commissioner to Malta in 1976, and served until 1979.

In 1979, Aspin was placed in charge of the Foreign and Commonwealth Office's dealings with Central and East Africa. Aspin was active in the East Africa Association after retiring from the Foreign Office and spent his remaining years in Dacre, a small village in Cumbria.

== Personal life ==
Aspin married Elizabeth, with whom he had three children. He died on 25 July 2011.
