= Bosara brevipecten =

Scientific classification
- Kingdom: Animalia
- Phylum: Arthropoda
- Clade: Pancrustacea
- Class: Insecta
- Order: Lepidoptera
- Family: Geometridae
- Genus: Bosara
- Species: B. brevipecten

Binomial name
- Bosara brevipecten Holloway, 1997

Species of moth

Bosara brevipecten is a moth in the family Geometridae. It is found on Borneo and Seram. The habitat consists of montane forests.

The length of the forewings is 7 mm.
