= Geofroy Tory =

British diplomat (1912–2012)

Sir Geofroy Tory KCMG PMN
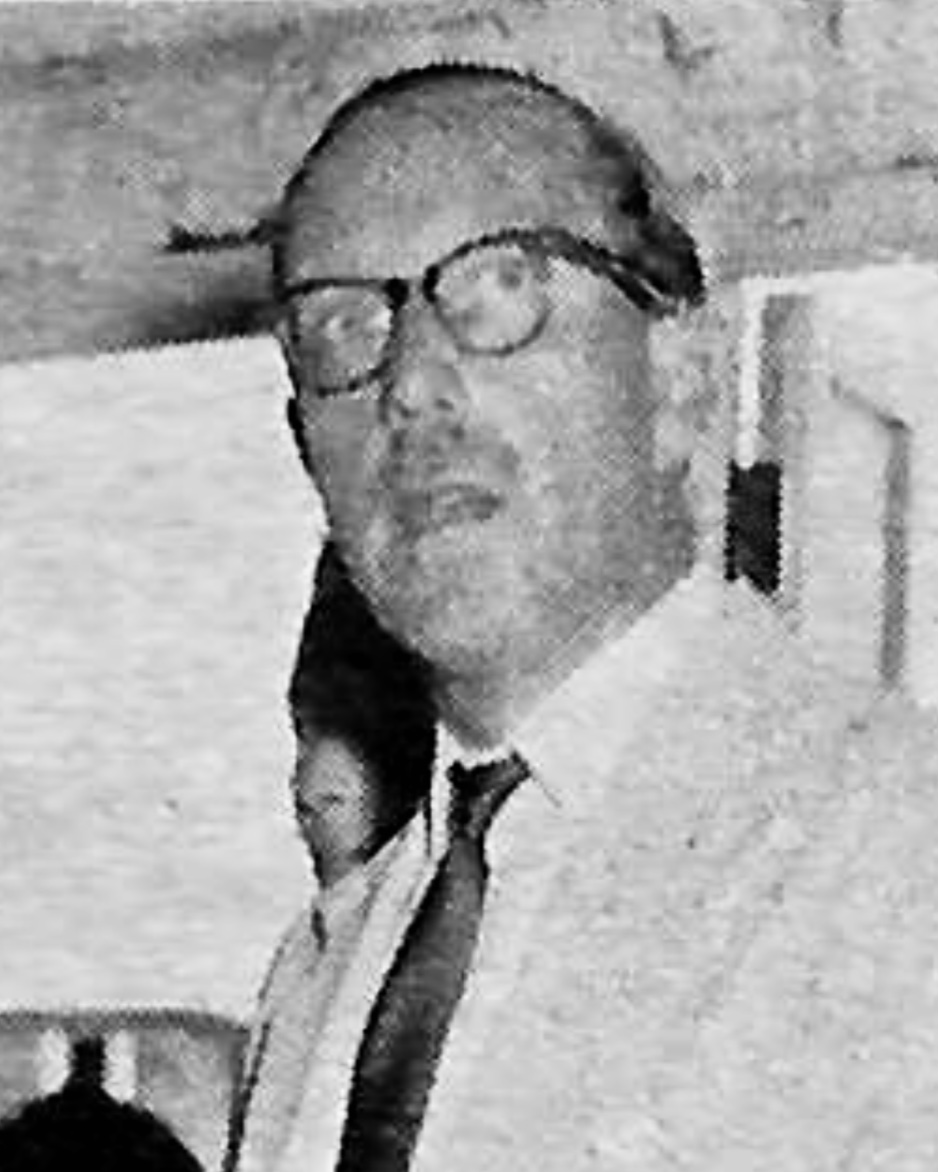
- Tory in Brunei, 1960

British High Commissioner to Malaya
- In office 1957–1963
- Preceded by: New office
- Succeeded by: The Viscount Head

British Ambassador to Ireland
- In office 1964–1967
- Preceded by: Sir Ian Maclennan
- Succeeded by: Sir Andrew Gilchrist

British High Commissioner to Malta
- In office 1967–1970
- Preceded by: Sir John Martin
- Succeeded by: Sir Duncan Watson

Personal details
- Born: 31 July 1912
- Died: 18 July 2012 (aged 99)
- Education: King Edward VII School; Queens’ College, Cambridge

Sir Geofroy William Tory, KCMG (31 July 1912 – 18 July 2012) was a British diplomat.

== Biography ==
The son of William Frank Tory and Edith Wreghitt, Tory was educated at King Edward VII School, Sheffield and Queens’ College, Cambridge, where he took a Double First in French and German and was a contemporary of Donald Maclean. He joined the Dominions Office in 1935, and served as the Private Secretary to Sir Edward Harding, Permanent Under-Secretaries of State for Dominion Affairs, during 1938–39.

In 1957, Tory was appointed as the first British High Commissioner to Malaya, serving there until 1963. Based in Kuala Lumpur, he wrote to Saville Garner in October 1962 about Tunku Abdul Rahman's views post-Malayan emergency. Tunku believed that there was a Communist conspiracy in Singapore, and Tory wrote that "our Security Service shares his view."

Between 1964 and 1967 he was the British Ambassador to Ireland, before serving as the High Commissioner of the United Kingdom to Malta between 1967 and 1970. In retirement he settled in Ireland.

Tory was appointed CMG in 1956 and KCMG in 1958. He was appointed honorary Commander of the Order of the Defender of the Realm of Malaysia in 1963.

== Honours ==
=== United Kingdom ===
- United Kingdom :
  - Companion of the Order of St Michael and St George (CMG) (1956)
  - Knight Commander of the Order of St Michael and St George (KCMG) – Sir (1958)

=== Commonwealth honours ===
- Malaya :
  - Honorary Commander of the Order of the Defender of the Realm (PMN (K)) – Tan Sri (1963)

Diplomatic posts
Preceded by New office	British High Commissioner to Malaya; 1957–1963	Succeeded by The Viscount Head as High Commissioner to Malaysia
Preceded by Sir Ian Maclennan	British Ambassador to Ireland; 1964–1967	Succeeded by Sir Andrew Gilchrist
Preceded by Sir John Martin	British High Commissioner to Malta; 1967–1970	Succeeded by Sir Duncan Watson
