= Anthony Golds =

British diplomat (1919–2003)

Anthony Arthur Golds CMG MVO (31 October 1919 – 6 May 2003) was a British diplomat.

He was educated at the King's School, Macclesfield and New College, Oxford. He served as British Ambassador to Cameroon from 1970 to 1972, and as the first British High Commissioner to Bangladesh from 1972 to 1974. He was appointed a Companion of the Order of St Michael and St George (CMG) in 1971.
