= Bosara linda =

Scientific classification
- Kingdom: Animalia
- Phylum: Arthropoda
- Class: Insecta
- Order: Lepidoptera
- Family: Geometridae
- Genus: Bosara
- Species: B. linda

Binomial name
- Bosara linda (Robinson, 1975)

Synonyms
- Chloroclystis linda Robinson, 1975

Species of moth

Bosara linda is a moth in the family Geometridae. It is found on Fiji.
