= Bosara minima =

Scientific classification
- Domain: Eukaryota
- Kingdom: Animalia
- Phylum: Arthropoda
- Class: Insecta
- Order: Lepidoptera
- Family: Geometridae
- Genus: Bosara
- Species: B. minima

Binomial name
- Bosara minima (Warren, 1897)

Synonyms
- Chloroclystis minima Warren, 1897; Gymnoscelis minima

Species of moth

Bosara minima is a moth in the family Geometridae. It is found in Queensland (type locality near Cairns; Australia), Sulawesi, New Guinea, the Bismarck Archipelago, and the Solomon Islands.
