= John Walter Nicholls =

British ambassador (1909–1970)

Sir John Nicholls GCMG OBE
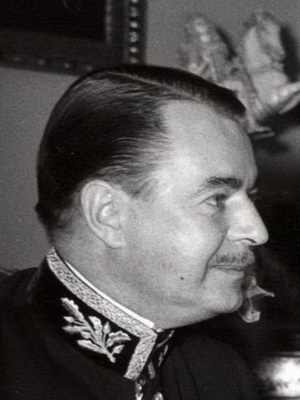

British Ambassador to South Africa
- In office 1966–1969
- Monarch: Elizabeth II
- Prime Minister: Harold Wilson
- Preceded by: Sir Hugh Stephenson
- Succeeded by: Sir Arthur Snelling

British Ambassador to Belgium
- In office 1960–1963
- Monarch: Elizabeth II
- Prime Minister: Harold Macmillan
- Preceded by: Sir George Labouchère
- Succeeded by: Sir Roderick Barclay

British Ambassador to Yugoslavia
- In office 1957–1960
- Monarch: Elizabeth II
- Prime Minister: Harold Macmillan
- Preceded by: Sir Frank Roberts
- Succeeded by: Sir Michael Creswell

British Ambassador to Israel
- In office 1954–1957
- Monarch: Elizabeth II
- Prime Minister: Sir Winston Churchill; Sir Anthony Eden; Harold Macmillan
- Preceded by: Sir Francis Evans
- Succeeded by: Sir Francis Rundall

Personal details
- Born: John Walter Nicholls; 4 October 1909 London
- Died: 25 October 1970 (aged 61) Felstead
- Spouse(s): Dominie Vlasto (1911–2007), m. 1935
- Children: 2 daughters, 1 son

Sir John Walter Nicholls GCMG OBE (4 October 1909 – 25 October 1970) was a British diplomat who was ambassador to Israel, Yugoslavia, Belgium and South Africa.

== Biography ==
Nicholls was educated at Malvern College and Pembroke College, Cambridge. He joined the Foreign Office with the rank of third secretary in 1932. In 1939 he was seconded to the Ministry of Economic Warfare and was appointed OBE for his work there in the 1941 Birthday Honours. He was Commercial Counsellor in the British embassy at Lisbon 1943-1944, in the Control Commission for Austria 1944–46, Head of the Supply and Relief Department at the Foreign Office 1946-47, Head of German Trade/Commercial and Industry Department, at the Foreign Office 1947-49, Minister at Moscow 1949-51, Assistant Under-Secretary of State at the Foreign Office 1951–54, ambassador to Israel 1954–57, ambassador to Yugoslavia 1957–60, ambassador to Belgium 1960–63, Deputy Under-Secretary of State at the Foreign Office 1963–66, and ambassador to South Africa 1966–69.

Nicholls was appointed CMG in the 1948 Birthday Honours, knighted KCMG in the 1956 New Year Honours and raised to GCMG in the 1970 New Year Honours.

== Offices held ==
Diplomatic posts
| Preceded by Sir Francis Evans | Ambassador Extraordinary and Plenipotentiary at Tel Aviv; 1954–1957 | Succeeded by Sir Francis Rundall |
| Preceded by Sir Frank Roberts | Ambassador Extraordinary and Plenipotentiary at Belgrade; 1957–1960 | Succeeded by Sir Michael Creswell |
| Preceded by Sir George Labouchère | Ambassador Extraordinary and Plenipotentiary at Brussels; 1960–1963 | Succeeded by Sir Roderick Barclay |
| Preceded by Sir Hugh Stephenson | Ambassador Extraordinary and Plenipotentiary at Cape Town; 1966–1969 | Succeeded by Sir Arthur Snelling |
