= Bosara cuneativenis =

Scientific classification
- Kingdom: Animalia
- Phylum: Arthropoda
- Clade: Pancrustacea
- Class: Insecta
- Order: Lepidoptera
- Family: Geometridae
- Genus: Bosara
- Species: B. cuneativenis

Binomial name
- Bosara cuneativenis (Prout, 1958)

Synonyms
- Chloroclystis cuneativenis Prout, 1958

Species of moth

Bosara cuneativenis is a moth in the family Geometridae. It is found on Sulawesi.
