= Arthur Wyatt (diplomat) =

British diplomat

Arthur Hope Wyatt CMG (12 October 1929 – 4 March 2015) was a British diplomat, Consul-General in Tehran during the siege of the US embassy in 1979. He subsequently became High Commissioner to Ghana from 1986 to 1989. He was awarded a CMG in the 1980 Birthday Honours.
