= David Aiers =

British diplomat (1922–1983)

David Pascoe Aiers CMG (19 September 1922 – 5 July 1983) was a British diplomat.

== Education ==
Aiers was educated at the Stationers' Company's School and Trinity College, Oxford.

== Military service ==
Aiers was a captain in the Royal Artillery from 1942 to 1946.

== Career ==
Aiers joined Her Majesty's Diplomatic Service in 1950. He was Third Secretary in Warsaw from 1946 to 1948 He was at the Foreign Office from to 1951; Second Secretary at Copenhagen from 1951 to 1953, then Buenos Aires from 1953 to 1955. After another spell at the FO he was First Secretary (Commercial) in Manila from 1958 to 1962; then Head of Chancery in Ankara from 1962 to 1965. He was Counsellor in Singapore from 1965 to 1968; Head of the SW Pacific Department at the FCO from 1968 to 1971; and then Minister at Canberra from 1971 to 1975. He was High Commissioner of the United Kingdom to Sri Lanka (and Ambassador of the United Kingdom to the Maldives from 1976 to 1979; and finally, and finally, High Commissioner to Malta from 1979 to 1982. His successor was Charles Leonard Booth.
