= Bosara subrobusta =

Scientific classification
- Kingdom: Animalia
- Phylum: Arthropoda
- Clade: Pancrustacea
- Class: Insecta
- Order: Lepidoptera
- Family: Geometridae
- Genus: Bosara
- Species: B. subrobusta

Binomial name
- Bosara subrobusta (Inoue, 1988)

Synonyms
- Eupithecia subrobusta Inoue, 1988; Chloroclystis subrobusta (Inoue, 1988)

Species of moth

Bosara subrobusta is a moth in the family Geometridae. It is found in Taiwan and Hong Kong.
