= DJ Zel =

British–Ghanaian DJ (born 2010)

- Born: Zelda Nana Yaa Adepa Dedaa Manteaw; 2010 (age 15–16)
- Genres: Hip hop

Zelda Nana Yaa Adepa Dedaa Manteaw (born 2010) known by the stage name DJ Zel, is a British-born Ghanaian disc jockey, singer and dancer. She is the youngest disc jockey to play on radio in the United Kingdom and she currently hosts the UniAfrik Show on GN Radio based in the UK.

== Career ==
Manteaw began her career as a disc jockey in November 2018. She trained as a disc jockey at the Subbass Academy of Electronic Music in Westminster and is currently receiving DJ lessons at London Sounds Academy, North West London.

She performed at the Barbican Centre for the mayor of London, Sadiq Khan, for London living wage. She also performed at St George's Cathedral in London and at the UnAfrik Live Jam in Leicester.

== Awards ==
She received an award for DJing at the 2019 International African Achievers Merit Awards ceremony which took place in Accra.
