= Nana Kofi Obonyaa =

Nana Kofi Obonyaa (7 January 1920 – 24 August 1999) born Roland James Moxon, became the first white chief taking up the stool of the Ankobea district of Aburi in 1963 and played an instrumental role in Chieftaincy. He was a white colonial officer, civil servant, tribal chief, writer, bookseller, publisher and restaurateur.

== History ==
Moxon moved to Gold Coast, now Ghana, during the World War II as a colonial civil servant. He was born in Shrewsbury and he attended Denstone College, Staffordshire. He studied history at St John's College, Cambridge.

After World War II, he moved to Ghana and became a District Commissioner serving in various Gold Coast stations, including Dodowa, Aburi, Kpando and Accra. After Ghana's independence, Dr. Kwame Nkrumah insisted that Moxon stay in Ghana. He became an adviser and a confidant to the President. Moxon played a major role in the institutionalization of Ghana Information Service especially the film unit. He was the friend of American capitalist Edgar F. Kaiser who contributed to the economic development of Ghana. Moxon was given a contract to assist the Volta River Authority (VRA) with publicity about the construction of the Akosombo Dam. Moxon visited Britain once a year as most of his life was lived in Ghana.

Moxon retired in 1963 and he was enstooled a Ghanaian chief with an official title Nana Kofi Obonyaa (literally means, “the chief born on Friday, who lives at the bottom of the cliff district). Moxon never married but sported traditional wives and adopted sons. He received foreign visitors passing through Africa with introductions to the "great white chief".

Moxon died of cancer in Accra on August 24, 1999, aged 79.

=== Significance ===
A shrine has been placed in the silk cotton tree that gave Moxon his tribal name; Nana Kofi Obonyaa

He founded Ghana's Oxford and Cambridge Society.

Moxon was published in Figaro as "Gentleman Jimmy, Chef Tribal en Afrique" and in numerous other articles and BBC documentaries.

Moxon got the second-highest-ranking Order of the British Empire (OBE) award in the year of Ghana's independence.
