= Owusu-Ansa =

19th-century prince of the Ashanti Empire

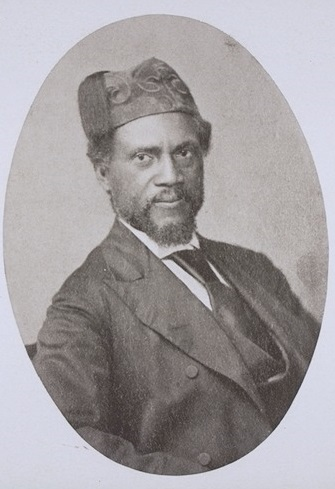
- Portrait photograph of Owusu-Ansa, taken by Fritz Ramseyer.
- Born: 1823
- Died: November 13, 1884 (aged 60–61); Cape Coast

Owusu-Ansa (1823 - November 13, 1884) was a prince of the Ashanti Empire. He was taken to the United Kingdom as adolescent, where he received a British education. After his return to West Africa in 1841, he first became a Methodist minister and, after his resignation from that position, a diplomat in the Ashanti Empire and the British Gold Coast. He played an important role in ending or preventing several Anglo-Ashanti conflicts.

== Life ==
=== Hostage ===
Owusu-Ansa was born as son of Asantehene Osei Bonsu in 1823, but there is practically no information about his life until 1831. In April 27 of that year, he and his cousin Nkwantabisa were handed over to the British as hostages, part of the Maclean treaty ending the first Anglo-Ashanti war. Until 1836, both lived in the Gold Coast colony capital of Cape Coast, where they adopted Methodist Christianity.

In August 1836, they arrived in Great Britain after two months of travel. They were sent to an Anglican school in Clapham, where they were given an elementary education. This education was designed as advertisement for the virtues of Great Britain. The British establishment paid some attention to them, including an invitation to the coronation of Queen Victoria in 1837.

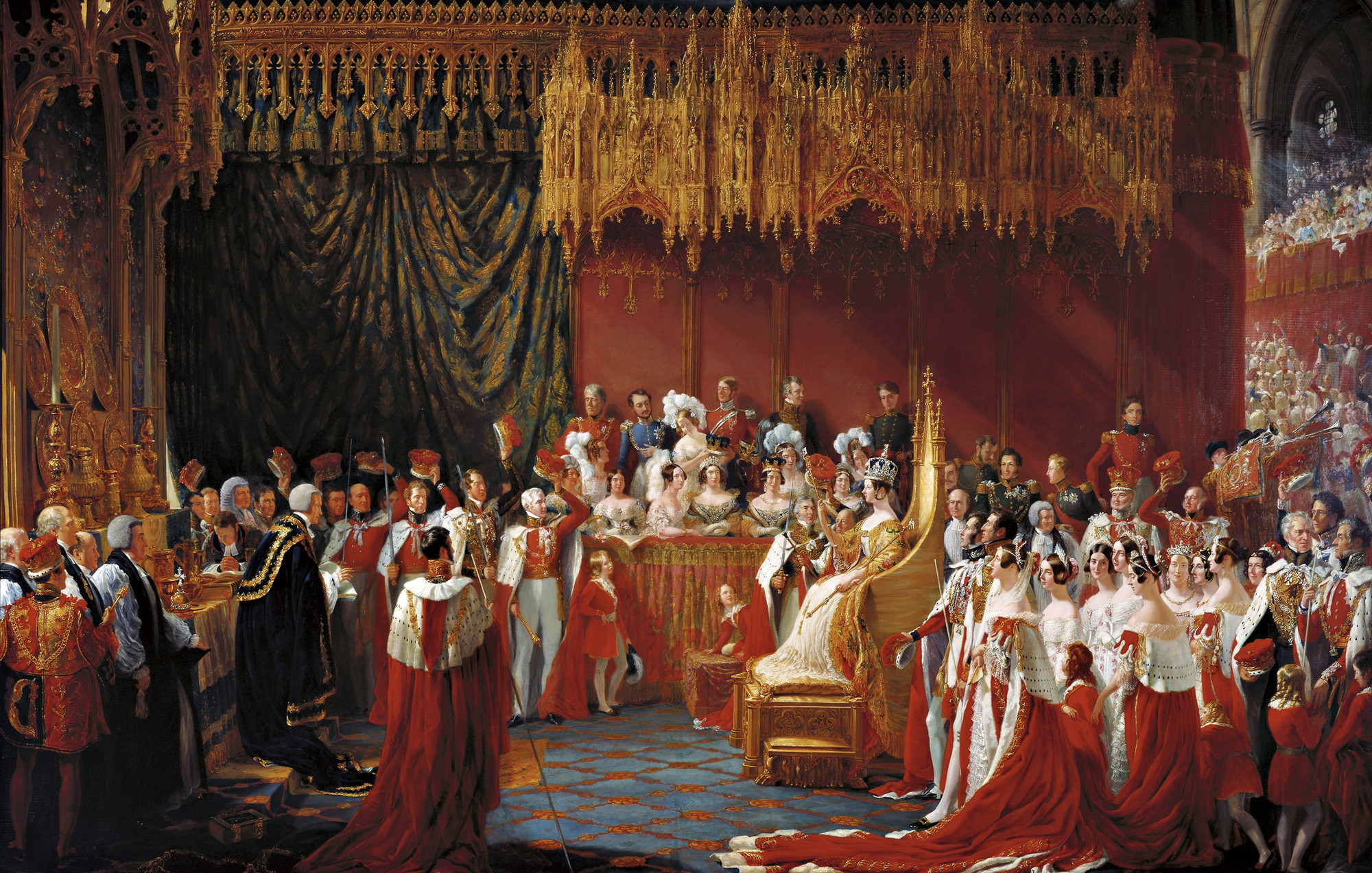
Owusu-Ansa was present at the coronation of the British queen Victoria in 1838.

In 1839, the Asantehene demanded the return of the hostages. They were given a farewell tour of Great Britain as well as an annual pension of £100, for which they were expected to promote British interests and visit the Gold Coast governor twice a year. They arrived back in West Africa in July 1841, where they lived with the governor for four months before travelling to Kumasi in November and December. The Ashanti establishment welcomed them back warmly, but was also suspicious of their ties to the British. Owusu-Ansa also suffered from a life-threatening fever shortly after his return to Kumasi.

=== Methodist minister ===
Between 1841 and 1853, Owusu-Ansa was the only Methodist official working in Kumasi. He worked full-time, successfully establishing a small community. He was ordained as Methodist minister in 1852. He was perceived as "a perfect gentleman and a dignified person, well respected by most people who knew him intimately." He married Sarah Scott, a Fante woman of mixed African and British heritage who he had met in Britain. His first child John was born in Kumasi in 1851. In 1853, he was re-stationed to Abakrampa.

In the same year, the Methodists granted him a three-week leave to Kumasi during a diplomatic crisis involving the Ashanti Empire. There, Asantehene Kwaku Dua I commissioned him to write a letter to the British Gold Coast governor dispelling rumours about a possible Ashanti invasion. He then carried several letters between the British governor and the Asantehene, playing a large part in preventing a possible war.

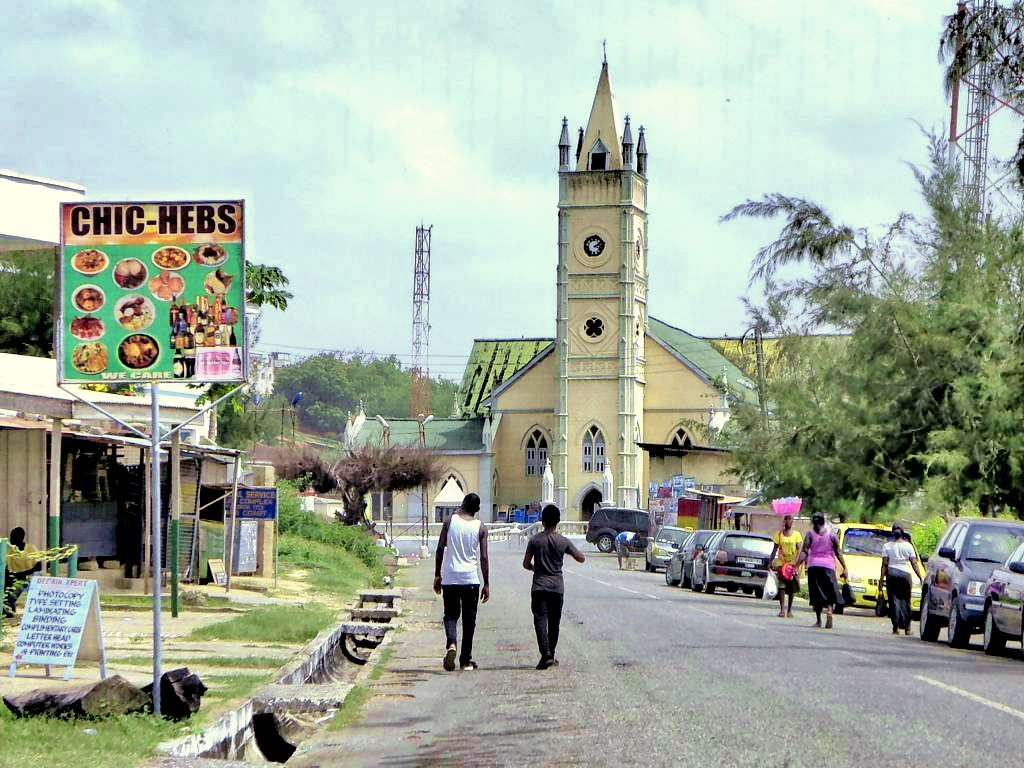
Wesley Methodist Cathedral in Cape Coast

While in Kumasi for these missions, Owusu-Ansa learned that leading Ashanti figures now regarded him as a traitor. This led him to request his re-stationing to Kumasi in order to win back their trust, but instead, he was re-stationed to Cape Coast as superintendent of the local Methodist school in 1853. In 1860, he again requested to be moved to Kumasi, this time from the Methodist headquarters in London. The request was granted, but the voyage made into a Methodist mission from March to April 1862. During the trip, Owusu-Ansa succeeded in regaining the trust he had lost among the Ashanti elite.

=== Diplomat ===
In December 1862, he resigned from the Methodist ministry, part of a larger trend of Africans leaving the Methodist service. He again played a large role in bringing an end to the second Anglo-Ashanti war, volunteering to negotiate with the leader of the Ashanti army, Owusu Koko. For his efforts, he was rewarded with a post in the colony's post office from 1863 to 1867. In that year, he again went to Kumasi, first for several months and then for over three years. Most of that time was spent as captive of the new Asantehene Kofi Karikari, who wanted to use his literary abilities and prevent information about a planned Ashanti attack on the Gold Coast from leaking out.

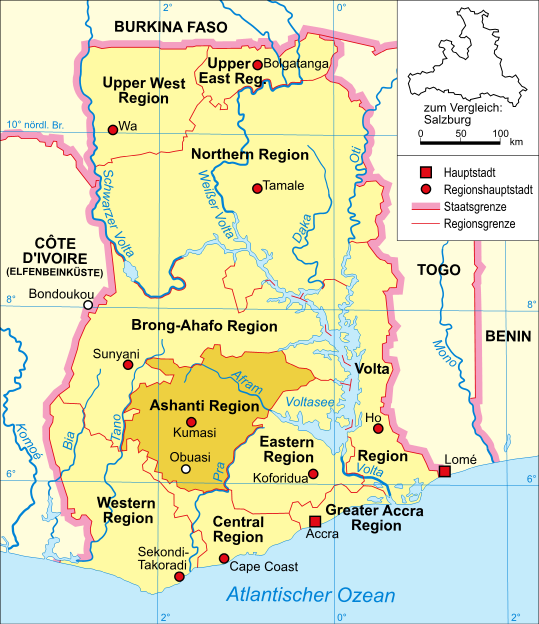
Today's political map of Ghana showing Cape Coast and Kumasi, where much of Owusu-Ansa's travelling took place.

During this time, he became very involved in trying to negotiate the release of several European missionaries and traders held captive in Kumasi. These included the Swiss missionary Fritz Ramseyer. Both these prisoners and the Asantehene valued Owusu-Ansa highly during this time. He was released in February 1871 and sent to the Gold Coast on an Ashanti diplomatic mission. He also kept up the negotiations for the release of the prisoners, especially trying to lower the ransom the Ashanti demanded for them. Both sides reached an agreement, but were interrupted by the third Anglo-Ashanti war, during which the prisoners were set free when the British were set to capture Kumasi.

=== Repression ===
During the war, in January 1873, a mob stormed Owusu-Ansa's house in Cape Coast and killed five Ashanti members of his household. He and other Ashantis living in the Gold Coast were accused of supporting the Ashanti war effort. He asked the British to investigate these claims to clear his name, but an investigation never took place. He then asked for asylum and was allowed to leave to Freetown in April. He also volunteered to negotiate between British and Ashanti, but the colonial government turned down this offer.

The following year, Owusu-Ansa went to London to defend himself against the accusations of aiding the Ashanti war effort. He was supported by Methodist friends, the Secretary of State for the Colonies Earl Carnarvon and the now-freed Ramseyer. The British government only resumed irregular payment of its pension, leaving Owusu-Ansa bitterly disappointed.

He returned to Cape Coast in 1874, where he faced British repression for trying to assist Ashanti rebuilding efforts. On several occasions, they threatened to stop paying his pension unless he stopped trying to support the Ashanti diplomatically. In 1882, he formed the Gold Coast Native Concession Purchasing Company, notably together with his several of his former Fante enemies. The company exported palm products, rubber and gold and imported cotton, hardware and weapons.

In 1877, the colonial government started spying on him because they feared he was in league with Asantehene Mensa Bonsu. In 1883, Owusu-Ansa played a role in an Ashanti succession crisis, but the British ordered him to return to Cape Coast. He sent a protest to London, but the British government was at this point already deliberating on where to exile him to.

Owusu-Ansa died on November 13, 1884, of diabetes, in Cape Coast. He was survived by his wife Sarah and three sons, John Senior, John Junior and Albert, all three of whom went on to play diplomatic roles for the Ashanti.
