= Poll Tax Ordinance of 1852 =

The Poll Tax Ordinance of 1852 was passed by the British to win the support of the chiefs to compel the people of southern Ghana to pay a levy of one thousand shillings each per year to be able to pay people who worked for them.

== Background ==
A tax system was introduced called the Poll tax ordinance to raise revenue based on government's commitment to the local people. Every man, woman or child who lives in the British jurisdiction to pay one shilling per head. This was enacted by the "Legislative Assembly" at Cape Coast which was then proposed and gave rise to the establishment of the Poll Tax ordinance in April 1852. The Legislative Assembly comprising the Governor, Major Stephen John Hill, Chiefs and headmen under British protection. Stephen John Hill signed the ordinance on behalf of the British crown.

This revenue was to aid in providing general public good like schools and hospitals, judicial matters and water.

== Causation of Failure ==
The poll tax ordinance was abolished 1861 because;

1. The tax collectors were selected by the British

2. Corrupt officials

3. The people in response said their chiefs didn't inform them before the law was passed leading to Chiefs losing respect .

4. Improper record keeping

5. Failure of the British to protect the coastal areas from the Ashantis
