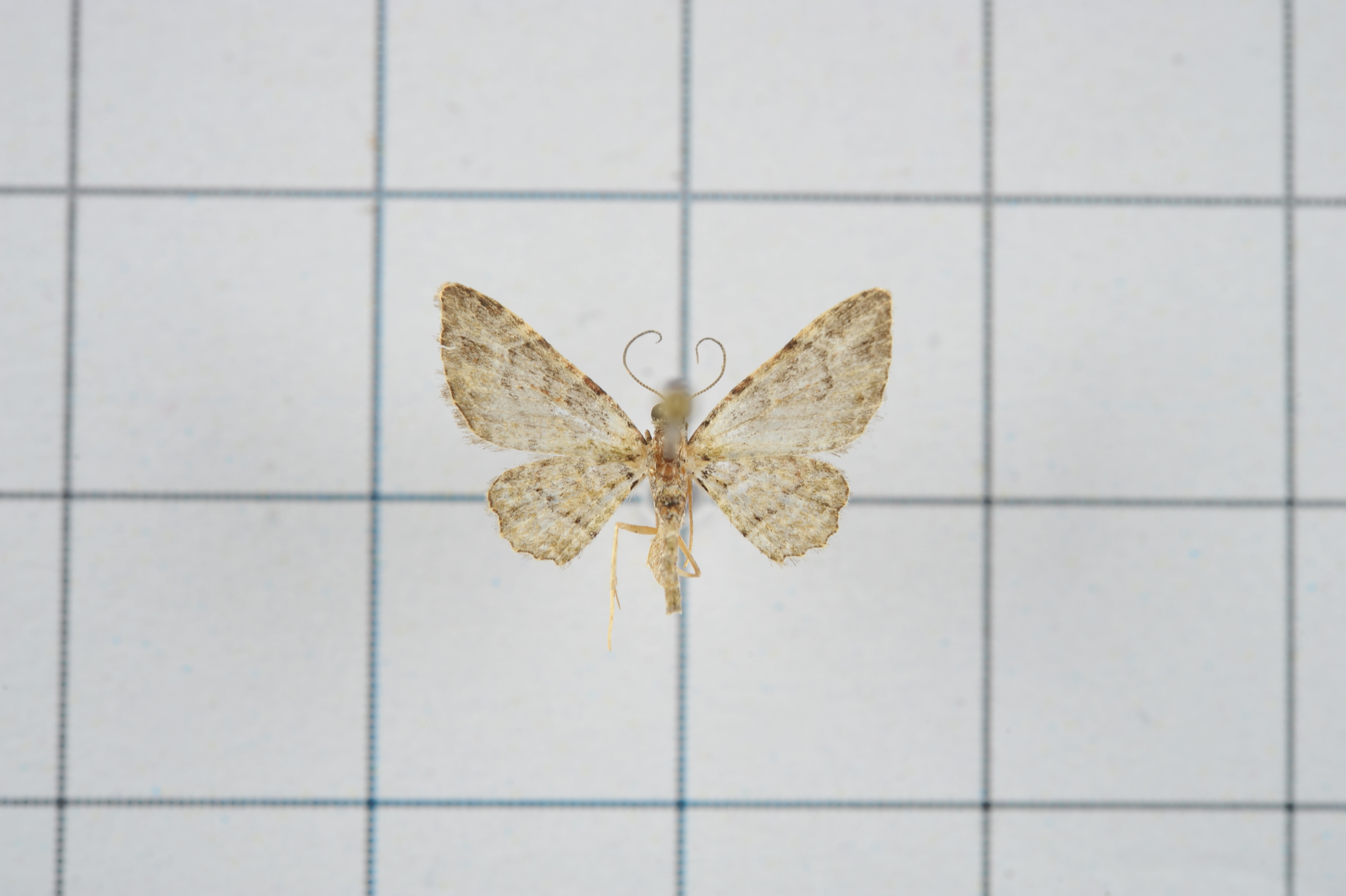
- Bosara errabunda

Scientific classification
- Kingdom: Animalia
- Phylum: Arthropoda
- Class: Insecta
- Order: Lepidoptera
- Family: Geometridae
- Tribe: Eupitheciini
- Genus: Bosara; Walker, 1866

Synonyms
- Gullaca Warren, 1903

= Bosara =

Genus of moths

Bosara is a genus of moths in the family Geometridae. They are small moths that occur in South, Southeast and East Asia and in Australia.

== Species ==
The Online Taxonomic Facility of Geometridae and the Geometric Moths of the World recognize the following 26 species:

- Bosara agassizi Galsworthy, 2003
- Bosara albitornalis (Prout, 1958)
- Bosara atypha (Prout, 1958)
- Bosara callinda (Holloway, 1979)
- Bosara catabares (Prout, 1958)
- Bosara corrobusta Inoue, 2002
- Bosara cuneativenis (Prout, 1958)
- Bosara dilatata Walker, 1866
- Bosara emarginaria (Hampson, 1893)
- Bosara epilopha (Turner, 1907)
- Bosara errabunda (Prout, 1958)
- Bosara exortiva (Prout, 1958)
- Bosara festivata (Warren, 1903)
- Bosara janae Galsworthy, 1999
- Bosara kadooriensis Galsworthy, 2003
- Bosara maculilinea (Warren, 1898)
- Bosara major Galsworthy, 2003
- Bosara minima (Warren, 1897)
- Bosara modesta (Warren, 1893)
- Bosara montana Galsworthy, 2003
- Bosara obliterata Inoue, 2002
- Bosara porphyrea Inoue, 2002
- Bosara pyrissous (Prout, 1958)
- Bosara refusaria (Walker, 1861)
- Bosara subrobusta (Inoue, 1988)
- Bosara torquibursa Galsworthy, 2003

The Moths of Borneo recognize the following species not included above:

- Bosara brevipecten Holloway, 1997
- Bosara bursacristata Holloway, 1997
- Bosara bursalobata Holloway, 1997
- Bosara longipecten Holloway, 1997
- Bosara reductata Holloway, 1997

The Online Taxonomic Facility of Geometridae recognizes the following under Chloroclystis, with the Geometric Moths of the World listing them as uncertain within Chloroclystis

- Bosara linda (Robinson, 1975)
- Bosara phoenicophaes (Prout, 1958)
- Bosara pygmaeica (Prout, 1958)
