= Arthur Snelling =

British civil servant and diplomat (1914–1996)

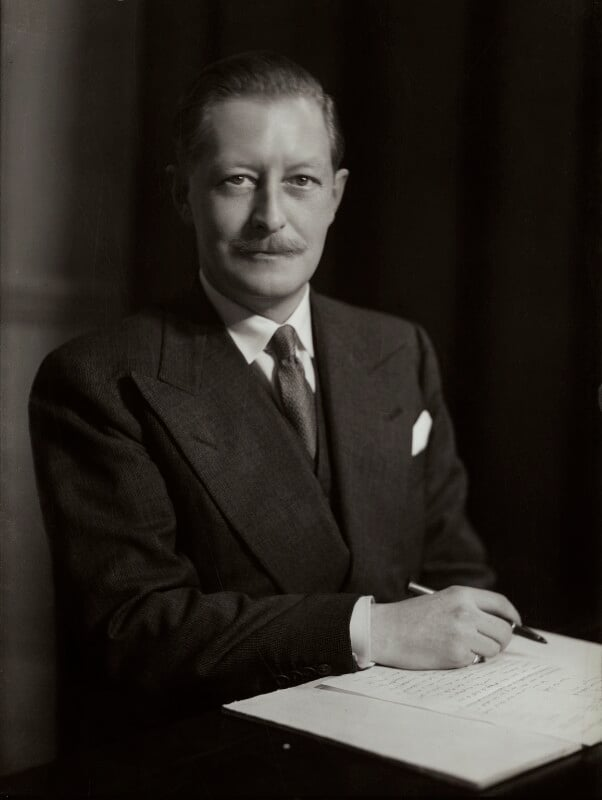
Snelling in 1953

Sir Arthur Wendell Snelling KCMG KCVO (7 May 1914 – 25 June 1996) was a senior British civil servant and diplomat.

He was educated at Ackworth School, Yorkshire, and University College, London.

He was Study Group Secretary at the Royal Institute of International Affairs, 1934–1936. He joined the Dominions Office in 1936, and became Private Secretary to the Parliamentary Under-Secretary in 1939. Snelling was Deputy High Commissioner for the UK in New Zealand, 1947–1950, and the Union of South Africa, May 1953–January 1956. He was Assistant Under-Secretary of State at the Commonwealth Relations Office, 1956–1959, and British High Commissioner in Ghana, 1959–1961. Snelling was Deputy Under-Secretary of State at the Foreign and Commonwealth Office, 1961–1969, and Ambassador to the Republic of South Africa, 1970–1973. He was Vice-President of the UK-South Africa Trade Association, 1974–1980.

Amongst friends and family he preferred the name Peter, using his birth name for public affairs and correspondence. He had suffered from, and been treated for, lung cancer but died of emphysema on 25 June 1996 at his home in Kingston upon Thames. He was survived by his wife Frieda (née Barnes) (11 November 1914 – 22 September 2016).

Diplomatic posts
Preceded by Sir Ian Maclennan	British High Commissioner to Ghana; 1959–1961	Succeeded by Sir Geoffrey de Freitas
Preceded by John Walter Nicholls	British Ambassador to South Africa; 1970–1973	Succeeded by Sir James Bottomley
