= Bosara emarginaria =

Scientific classification
- Kingdom: Animalia
- Phylum: Arthropoda
- Clade: Pancrustacea
- Class: Insecta
- Order: Lepidoptera
- Family: Geometridae
- Genus: Bosara
- Species: B. emarginaria

Binomial name
- Bosara emarginaria (Hampson, 1893)

Synonyms
- Eupithecia emarginaria Hampson, 1893; Gullaca exilis Bastelberger, 1905

Species of moth

Bosara emarginaria is a moth in the family Geometridae first described by George Hampson in 1893. It is found on Borneo and in Sri Lanka, the north-eastern Himalayas and Hong Kong. The habitat consists of lowland dipterocarp forests.

The wingspan is about 2/3 inch (17 mm).

The larvae possibly feed on Breynia species.
