= John Galsworthy (diplomat) =

British diplomat (1919–1992)

Sir John Edgar Galsworthy KCVO CMG
- Born: 19 June 1919
- Died: 18 May 1992 (aged 72)
- Education: Emanuel School; Corpus Christi College, Cambridge
- Occupation: Diplomat
- Relatives: Sir Arthur Galsworthy (brother); Sir Anthony Galsworthy (nephew)
- Military career
- Allegiance: United Kingdom
- Branch: British Army
- Service years: 1939-1945
- Service number: 130051
- Unit: Duke of Cornwall's Light Infantry
- Conflicts: World War II

Sir John Edgar Galsworthy KCVO CMG (19 June 1919 – 18 May 1992) was a British diplomat, ambassador to Mexico 1972–1977, and counsellor to the UK delegation to the EEC. He was knighted KCVO in 1975 on the occasion of the Queen's state visit to Mexico.

He was educated at Emanuel School and Corpus Christi College, Cambridge, and served in World War II as an officer in the Duke of Cornwall's Light Infantry. His service number was 130051.

Galsworthy's brother, Sir Arthur Galsworthy KCVO, was the Governor of the Pitcairn Islands and High Commissioner to New Zealand from 1970 to 1973. In 1973, he was appointed Ambassador to Ireland, where he served from 1973 to 1976. Arthur Galsworthy is the father of the diplomat Sir Anthony Galsworthy.
