= Arthur Galsworthy =

British diplomat (1916–1986)

Sir Arthur Norman Galsworthy KCMG (1 July 1916 – 7 October 1986) was a British soldier and diplomat. He was educated at Emanuel School and the University of Cambridge. In 1967, he was established a Knight Commander of the Order of St Michael and St George (KCMG).

In 1970, he was appointed by the British government to serve as the Governor of Pitcairn Islands and High Commissioner to New Zealand. In 1973, he was established the Ambassador to Ireland, where he served from 1973 to 1976.

== Personal background ==
Galsworthy is the father of the diplomat, Sir Anthony Galsworthy. His brother, Sir John Galsworthy KCVO, CMG was the British ambassador to Mexico 1972–1977.

== Arms ==
Coat of arms of Arthur Galsworthy

Motto
Nunquam Non Paratus

Diplomatic posts
Preceded by John Peck	British Ambassador to Ireland; 1973–1976	Succeeded by Christopher Ewart-Biggs
