= Bosara refusaria =

Scientific classification
- Domain: Eukaryota
- Kingdom: Animalia
- Phylum: Arthropoda
- Class: Insecta
- Order: Lepidoptera
- Family: Geometridae
- Genus: Bosara
- Species: B. refusaria

Binomial name
- Bosara refusaria (Walker, 1861)

Synonyms
- Acidalia refusaria Walker, 1861

Species of moth

Bosara refusaria is a moth in the family Geometridae. It is found in the Peninsular Malaysia, Borneo, Bali, and the Philippines. The habitat consists of lowland dipterocarp forests and secondary forests.
