= Stanley Duncan =

British diplomat (1927–2025)

Stanley Frederick St Clair Duncan CMG FRGS (13 November 1927 – 15 February 2025) was a British diplomat in the second half of the 20th century.

== Background ==
Duncan was born on 13 November 1927. He was educated at Latymer Upper School. After his retirement in November 1987, he completed a BA(hons) degree with the Open University. Duncan died on 15 February 2025, at the age of 97.

== Career ==
Duncan joined the India Office in 1946 which became part of the Commonwealth Relations Office a year later following India's independence. He was Second Secretary in Ottawa, then Toronto as British Government Information Officer from 1955 to 1957 where he had to cope with a hostile Canadian media at the time of the Suez Crisis. He then was Second Secretary in Wellington, New Zealand until 1960. He was First Secretary at the CRO, and was seconded to the Central African Office, a unit set up by the Prime Minister, Harold Macmillan, under Rab Butler, then Home Secretary, to sort out a growing crisis in the Federation of Rhodesia and Nyasaland and when it could no longer be held together was a member of the British delegation at the Victoria Falls Conference to arrange for its orderly dissolution.

He was responsible for Southern Rhodesia in the Central African Office and in 1962 helped to pilot the legislation for a new Southern Rhodesian constitution through Parliament.The Southern Rhodesian electorate rejected the constitution and called for independence. He supported Butler in talks with the Southern Rhodesian delegation at Victoria Falls about the conditions under which their demands might be met and at further talks with them in London. In the light of non-agreement he was involved in preparation for the possibility of a unilateral declaration of independence by the Rhodesians. When fighting broke out between the Greek and Turkish Cypriots in December 1963 he was selected to go to Cyprus but was held back in London because of continuing tensions in relations with Southern Rhodesia. He finally reached Cyprus in September 1964 as First Secretary where he remained until 1967. He returned to London to participate in the process of amalgamating the Information departments in the newly formed Foreign and Commonwealth Relations Office and was also Adviser to the British group at the Inter-Parliamentary Union from 1968 to 1970. Head of Chancery in Lisbon from 1970 to 1973. He was Consul-General in Mozambique at the time of the rebellion by the Portuguese army in 1964 and remained to open diplomatic relations with the FRELIMO-led independence government in July 1975. He was selected to be Ambassador but the Mozambique government preferred an appointee who had not been accredited to the Portuguese government. He opened the new embassy as Chargé d'affaires until his replacement arrived. He was Counsellor (Political) at Brasília from 1976 to 1977; Head of the Consular Department at the Foreign and Commonwealth Office from 1977 to 1980; seconded to the Canadian National Defence College from 1980 to 1981; Ambassador to Bolivia in 1981. The Falklands War with Argentina caused him successfully to advise the military government not to involve Bolivia in the conflict and was able subsequently to witness the return to democratic government there. He left Bolivia in 1985 and went finally, as High Commissioner to Malta where he presided over the resolution of the seven-year long dispute with the Maltese government about the clearance of bombs and wrecks from the Grand Harbour of Valletta left over from the 1939–1945 war. Royal Navy ships had been denied visiting Malta during the dispute but the good relations which he was able to reestablish allowed their return to much acclaim.

== Honours ==
Duncan was awarded the Portuguese Order of Christ in 1973 and C.M.G. in 1983.
