= Frank Mills (diplomat) =

British diplomat

Sir Frank Mills, KCVO, CMG (3 December 1923 – 11 May 2006) was a British diplomat. Educated at Emmanuel College, Cambridge, he served in the Royal Air Force Volunteer Reserve during the Second World War and then entered the Commonwealth Relations Office in 1946; he was Private Secretary to the Secretary of State for Commonwealth Relations from 1960 to 1962. He was the United Kingdom's High Commissioner to Ghana from 1975 to 1978 and to Bangladesh from 1981 to 1983.

Mills was appointed a Companion of the Order of St Michael and St George in the 1971 Birthday Honours and a Knight Commander of the Royal Victorian Order in 1983.
