= David Walker (diplomat) =

New Zealand diplomat

- Occupation: Diplomat

David Walker is a New Zealand diplomat. He is a chartered accountant, and has served since 2017 as the New Zealand ambassador and permanent representative to the WTO. He was nominated to hold the chair of the WTO Dispute Settlement Body in 2019, and then was nominated to the chair of the WTO General Council in March 2020.
