= Anthony Galsworthy =

British diplomat (1944– )

Sir Anthony Galsworthy KCMG

British Ambassador to China
- In office 1997–2002
- Monarch: Elizabeth II
- President: Jiang Zemin
- Prime Minister: Tony Blair
- Preceded by: Sir Leonard Appleyard
- Succeeded by: Sir Christopher Hum

Principal Private Secretary to the Foreign Secretary
- In office 1986–1988
- Prime Minister: Margaret Thatcher
- Preceded by: Sir Leonard Appleyard
- Succeeded by: Sir Stephen Wall
- Born: 20 December 1944 (age 81)
- Education: St Paul's School, London; University of Cambridge (MA)
- Father: Arthur Galsworthy
- Relatives: John Galsworthy (uncle)

Sir Anthony Charles Galsworthy KCMG (born 20 December 1944) is a retired British diplomat (former ambassador to China) and amateur naturalist.

== Education ==
Galsworthy was educated at St Paul's School, an independent school for boys in London, followed by the University of Cambridge, where he obtained an MA.

== Life and career ==
Galsworthy held a variety of posts in the Diplomatic Service, serving as Ambassador to the People's Republic of China from 1997 to 2002. He is the son of Arthur Galsworthy, and was appointed CMG in 1985 and KCMG in 1999.

Diplomatic posts
Preceded by Sir Leonard Appleyard	Principal Private Secretary to the Foreign Secretary; 1986–1988	Succeeded by Sir Stephen Wall
Preceded by Sir Leonard Appleyard	British Ambassador to China; 1997–2002	Succeeded by Sir Christopher Hum
