= Archibald Nye =

British Army officer (1895–1967)

Lieutenant-General Sir Archibald Nye GCSI GCMG GCIE KCB KBE MC
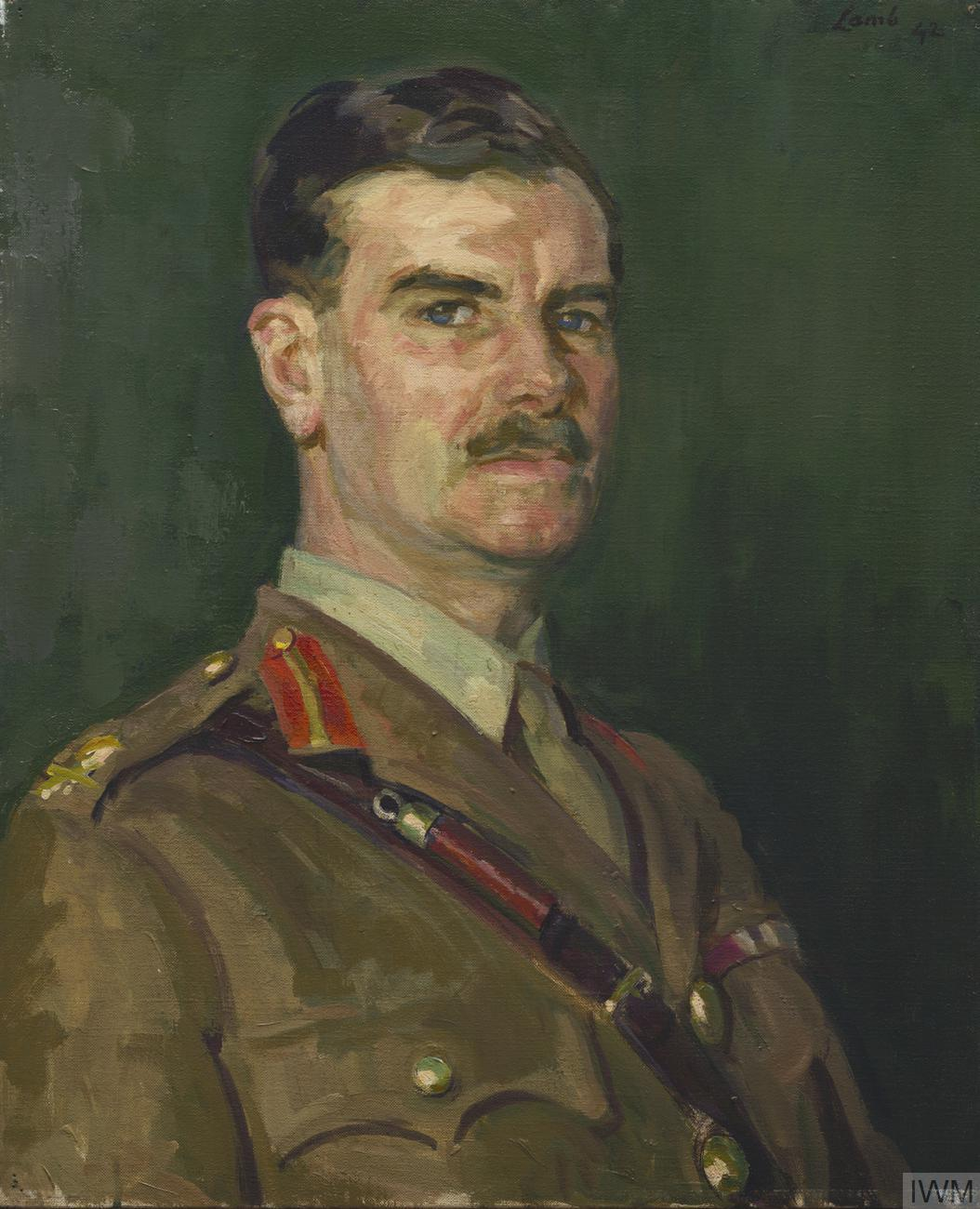
- Portrait of Nye, 1942
- Born: 23 April 1895; Ship St Barracks, Dublin, Ireland
- Died: 13 November 1967 (aged 72); London, England
- Spouse: Una Sheila Colleen Knox (m. 1939)
- Military career
- Allegiance: United Kingdom
- Branch: British Army
- Service years: 1914–1946
- Rank: Lieutenant-General
- Service number: 5851
- Units: Corps of Army Schoolmasters; Prince of Wales's Leinster Regiment (Royal Canadians); Royal Warwickshire Regiment
- Commands: Vice-Chief of the Imperial General Staff (1941–46); Nowshera Brigade (1939–40); 2nd Battalion, Royal Warwickshire Regiment (1937–39)
- Conflicts: First World War; Second World War
- Awards: Knight Grand Commander of the Order of the Star of India; Knight Grand Cross of the Order of St Michael and St George; Knight Grand Commander of the Order of the Indian Empire; Knight Commander of the Order of the Bath; Knight Commander of the Order of the British Empire; Military Cross
- Other work: Governor of Madras; High Commissioner to India; British High Commissioner to Canada

Lieutenant-General Sir Archibald Edward Nye, GCSI, GCMG, GCIE, KCB, KBE, MC (23 April 1895 – 13 November 1967) was a senior British Army officer who served in both world wars and was Vice-Chief of the Imperial General Staff from 1941 to 1946 during the Second World War. Post-war, he served as Governor of Madras, after which Jawaharlal Nehru asked for him to stay on as High Commissioner in India. He subsequently served as High Commissioner to Canada.

== Early life ==
Archibald Edward Nye was born on 23 April 1895 at Ship Street Barracks, Dublin, to Charles Edward Nye and Mary Sexton. He was the second of three sons born to the couple, who also had three daughters. His father was a regimental sergeant major in the Oxfordshire and Buckinghamshire Light Infantry, British Army.

Nye was educated at the Duke of York's Royal Military School, a boarding school for sons of non-commissioned officers, and desired to become a schoolmaster. But the First World War broke out at this juncture and Nye joined the Army.

== Military career ==
At the outset of the Great War, Nye went to France with the British Expeditionary Force in 1914, serving for just over a year as a non-commissioned officer in the Corps of Army Schoolmasters attached to the Oxfordshire and Buckinghamshire Light Infantry. In 1915, as a sergeant, he was selected for a permanent commission in the Prince of Wales' Leinster Regiment, and was commissioned as a second lieutenant on 5 December 1915.

He was further promoted to lieutenant on 5 September 1916, and to the acting rank of captain in August 1917. Wounded twice in action, he was awarded the Military Cross for bravery. The official citation for this ward reads:

For conspicuous gallantry and devotion to duty on 20th October, 1918 near Esscher. He made a reconnaissance, under heavy shell and machine-gun fire, of the forward positions along the whole battalion front adjusting a portion on his own initiative to complete the line. He was of great assistance to his commanding officer throughout the week's fighting.

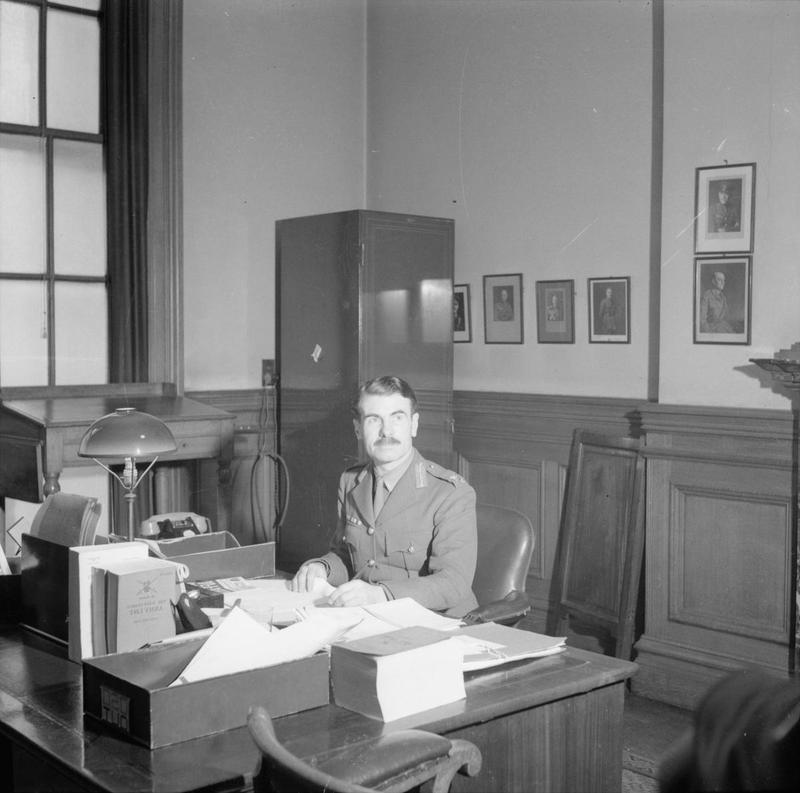
Major-General Archibald Edward Nye, the Vice-Chief of the Imperial General Staff (VCIGS), at his desk in the War Office.

When the Leinster Regiment was disbanded, Nye was transferred to the Royal Warwickshire Regiment. During the interwar period he had a number of regimental appointments. Promoted to captain on 20 June 1923, he attended the staff officer's course at the Staff College, Camberley in 1924–25 which he successfully completed. Following this, he served as a staff officer in Air Cooperation from 1926–28 before becoming a brigade major with the 33rd Infantry Brigade. Brevetted to major on 1 July 1930, he completed his graduation in law and qualified as a barrister at the Inner Temple in 1932. He was then posted as an instructor to the Staff College with the local rank of lieutenant-colonel, and advanced to brevet lieutenant-colonel on 1 July 1934. Nye was promoted to the substantive rank of major on 8 September 1935, and to the substantive rank of lieutenant-colonel in September 1937. From late 1937 to early 1939, he commanded the 2nd Battalion, Royal Warwickshire Regiment.

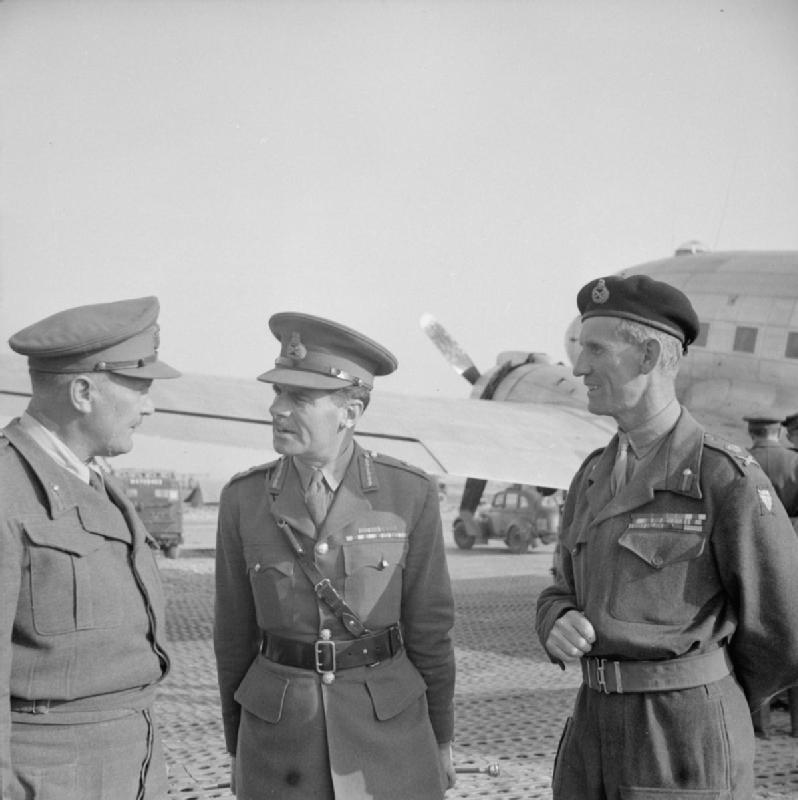
Lieutenant-General Sir Archibald Nye, Vice-Chief of the Imperial General Staff with Lieutenant-Generals Freyberg (left) and McCreery (right) at Forli airfield, Italy during a flying visit to the British Eighth Army.

On 20 May 1939, Nye was promoted to colonel, with the temporary rank of brigadier, and sent to India to raise a brigade, commanding the Nowshera Brigade from May 1939 to January 1940. In February 1940 he returned to London to take up the post of deputy director of Staff Duties, War Office and became Director of Staff Duties with the acting rank of major-general from 1 November. Promoted to substantive major-general on 18 November 1941, in December he became Vice-Chief of the Imperial General Staff under Sir Alan Brooke with the acting rank of lieutenant-general from 5 December. The enormous burdens placed on Brooke meant that he needed to delegate many of his tasks and for this he relied heavily on Nye. The partnership was highly successful and Nye remained in the job for the rest of the war. It could be said that while Brooke ran the war, Nye ran the army. Advanced to the temporary rank of lieutenant-general on 5 December 1942, in the 1944 Birthday Honours Nye was knighted as a Knight Commander of the Order of the British Empire, the first of five knighthoods he would ultimately be conferred with. He was promoted to the substantive rank of lieutenant-general on 14 September 1944. Nye retired on 29 March 1946.

== Later life ==
Following his retirement, Nye was appointed Governor of Madras on 26 February 1946, took charge on 5 May 1946 and served as governor till 7 September 1948. The day prior to his appointment as governor there was a major labour strike in Madras. The rest of his term was plagued by peasant uprisings all over the province. These rebellions were aided and abetted by the Communists who established miniature governments along the northern frontiers of the Presidency, thereby demanding military action.

Nye attributed their success to the "zeal and energy of young men who conducted their own newspapers and who preached the creed of expropriating landlords and distributing their land to needy and hungry labourers". Nye was also the Colonel-in-chief of the Madras Regiment from 10 August 1946 to 31 March 1949. The Recruits Training Centre was moved from Madukkarai near Coimbatore to Wellington in February 1947. Nye inaugurated the Madras offices of the British Council in July–August 1948.

In November 1947, when Sir Frederick Gentle, the Chief Justice of the Madras High Court, resigned over the Government of India order that the Chief Minister of the particular state should be consulted along with the Union Home Minister with regard to the selection of High Court judges, Nye expressed support for Gentle against political interference in appointment of judges.

Nye presided over independence day celebrations in Madras city. On 15 August 1947, Nye was sworn in by Chief Justice Gentle as the first Governor of Madras in the Dominion of India while O.P. Ramaswami Reddiar was sworn in as Premier. Nye unfurled the Indian tricolour at the Island Grounds.

Following his term in Madras, Nye was appointed the UK's High Commissioner to India, in which post he served from 1948 to 1952. He then served as the UK's High Commissioner to Canada from 1952 to 1956.

== Family ==
In 1939, Nye married divorcee Una Sheila Colleen, daughter of Sir Harry Hugh Sidney Knox. The couple had one daughter, Harriet.

In the 1960s and 1970s, Lady Nye was a member of Wiltshire County Council and was a member of its Education Committee.

== Honours ==

Order of wear per current London Gazette regulations.

- Knight Grand Commander of the Order of the Star of India (GCSI) (August 14, 1947)
- Knight Grand Cross of the Order of St. Michael and St. George (GCMG) (June 7, 1951)
- Knight Grand Commander of the Order of the Indian Empire (GCIE) (February 8, 1946)
- Knight Commander of the Order of the Bath, Military Division (KCB) (January 1, 1946)
- Knight Commander of the Order of the British Empire, Military Division (KBE) (June 1, 1944)
- Military Cross (MC) (1918)

== Bibliography ==
- Alanbrooke, Field Marshal Lord (2001). Danchev, Alex; Todman, Daniel (eds.). War Diaries 1939–1945. Phoenix Press. ISBN 1-84212-526-5.
- Mead, Richard (2007). Churchill's Lions: a biographical guide to the key British generals of World War II. Stroud (UK): Spellmount. ISBN 978-1-86227-431-0.
- Smart, Nick (2005). Biographical Dictionary of British Generals of the Second World War. Barnesley: Pen & Sword. ISBN 1844150496.

Military offices
Preceded by Sir Henry Pownall	Vice-Chief of the Imperial General Staff; 1941–1946	Succeeded by Sir Frank Simpson
Diplomatic posts
New title	High Commissioner to India; 1948–1952	Succeeded by Alexander Clutterbuck
Preceded by Alexander Clutterbuck	High Commissioner to Canada; 1952–1956	Succeeded by Saville Garner
