= James Bevan =

James Bevan may refer to:

- James Bevan (rugby union) (1858–1938), Welsh international rugby union player
  - James Bevan Trophy
- James Bevan (diplomat) (born 1959), British diplomat
