= Walter Hankinson =

British diplomat (1894–1984)

Sir Walter Hankinson KCMG OBE MC

British Ambassador to Ireland
- In office 1951–1955
- Preceded by: Sir Gilbert Laithwaite
- Succeeded by: Sir Alexander Clutterbuck

High Commissioner of the United Kingdom to Ceylon
- In office 1948–1951
- Preceded by: Position established
- Succeeded by: Sir Cecil Syers

Personal details
- Born: 11 July 1894 Broughton, Lancashire
- Died: 21 January 1984 (aged 89)
- Education: Jesus College, Oxford
- Occupation: Civil servant and Diplomat

Sir Walter Crossfield Hankinson (11 July 1894 – 21 January 1984) was a British civil servant and diplomat. He served as High Commissioner of the United Kingdom to Ceylon from 1948 to 1951 and British Ambassador to Ireland from 1951 to 1955.

== Early life and education ==
Hankinson was born on 11 July 1894 at Broughton, Lancashire, the youngest son of Alfred William Hankinson, a chemist. He was educated at Manchester Grammar School and Jesus College, Oxford.

== Career ==
Hankinson served during World War I with the Royal Fusiliers and the York and Lancaster Regiment in France and Egypt, rising to captain, and was awarded the Military Cross in November 1918.

Hankinson entered the Colonial Office in 1920, and in 1925 was transferred to the Dominions Office. Between 1931 and 1932, and from 1935 to 1936, he was acting British Government Representative in Australia. From 1937 to 1939, he served as principal private secretary to successive Secretaries of State for Dominion Affairs. He was then principal secretary at the office of the British High Commissioner in Canada from 1939 to 1941, and principal secretary to the representative of the United Kingdom in Ireland from 1942 to 1943.

Hankinson returned to Australia in 1943 serving as deputy high commissioner until 1947 (acting 1945–46). He then served as High Commissioner to Ceylon from 1948 to 1951, the first incumbent after Ceylon became a self-governing dominion of the British Commonwealth, and then as Ambassador to the Republic of Ireland from 1951 to 1955.

== Personal life and death ==
Hankinson married Sheila Watson, an Australian, in 1936.

Hankinson died on 21 January 1984, aged 89.

== Honours ==
Hankinson was appointed Companion of the Order of St Michael and St George (CMG) in the 1941 Birthday Honours, and promoted to Knight Commander (KCMG) in the 1948 New Year Honours. He was appointed Officer of the Order of the British Empire (OBE) in the 1936 New Year Honours. In 1918, he awarded the Military Cross (MC).

== See also ==
- Sri Lanka–United Kingdom relations
- Ireland–United Kingdom relations

Diplomatic posts
New office	High Commissioner of the United Kingdom to Ceylon; 1948–1951	Succeeded by Sir Cecil Syers
Preceded by Sir Gilbert Laithwaite	British Ambassador to Ireland; 1951–1955	Succeeded by Sir Alexander Clutterbuck
