= List of high commissioners of the United Kingdom to Zambia =

British High Commissioner to Zambia
- Royal arms of His Majesty's Government
- Reports to: Secretary of State for Foreign, Commonwealth and Development Affairs
- Residence: Lusaka
- Inaugural holder: Sir Leslie Monson; First high commissioner to Zambia
- Formation: 1964
- Website: www.gov.uk/world/zambia

The high commissioner of the United Kingdom to Zambia is the United Kingdom's foremost diplomatic representative in the Republic of Zambia, and head of the UK's diplomatic mission in Lusaka.

As fellow members of the Commonwealth of Nations, the United Kingdom and Zambia conduct their diplomatic relations at governmental level, rather than between heads of state. Therefore, the countries exchange high commissioners, rather than ambassadors.

== High commissioners to Zambia ==
- 1964–1966: Sir Leslie Monson
- 1967–1971: Sir Laurence Pumphrey
- 1971–1974: John Duncan
- 1974–1978: Stephen Miles
- 1978–1980: Sir Leonard Allinson
- 1980–1984: Sir John Johnson
- 1984–1987: William White
- 1988–1990: John Willson
- 1990–1993: Peter Hinchcliffe
- 1994–1997: Patrick Nixon
- 1997–2001: Thomas Young
- 2001–2005: Timothy David
- 2005–2008: Alistair Harrison
- 2008–2011: Thomas Carter and Carolyn Davidson
- 2012–2015: James Thornton
- 2015–2016: Lucy Joyce (acting)
- 2016–2019: Fergus Cochrane-Dyet
- 2019– 2024: Nicholas Wooley
- 2024– 2025: Sam Waldock (acting)
- 2025– Present: Rebecca Terzeon

- UK and Zambia, gov.uk
