= John Johnson (diplomat) =

British colonial administrator, diplomat and academic administrator

Sir John Rodney Johnson, KCMG FRGS (6 September 1930 – 15 October 2018) was a British colonial administrator, diplomat, and academic administrator.

After serving in the Colonial Service in Kenya, Johnson joined the Foreign Service, becoming Consul-General and then Ambassador to Chad in 1978, British High Commissioner to Zambia and to Kenya. After his retirement, he served as Director of the University of Oxford's Foreign Service Programme. He was also chairman of the Countryside Commission.

Johnson was appointed a Companion of the Order of St Michael and St George (CMG) in the 1981 New Year Honours, and promoted to Knight Commander of the Order (KCMG) in the 1988 Birthday Honours.

Diplomatic posts
Preceded by Leonard Allinson	High Commissioner to Zambia; 1980-1984	Succeeded by William White
Preceded by Leonard Allinson	High Commissioner to Kenya; 1986-1990	Succeeded by Roger Tomkys
