= William Patey =

British diplomat (born 1953)

Sir William Patey KCMG
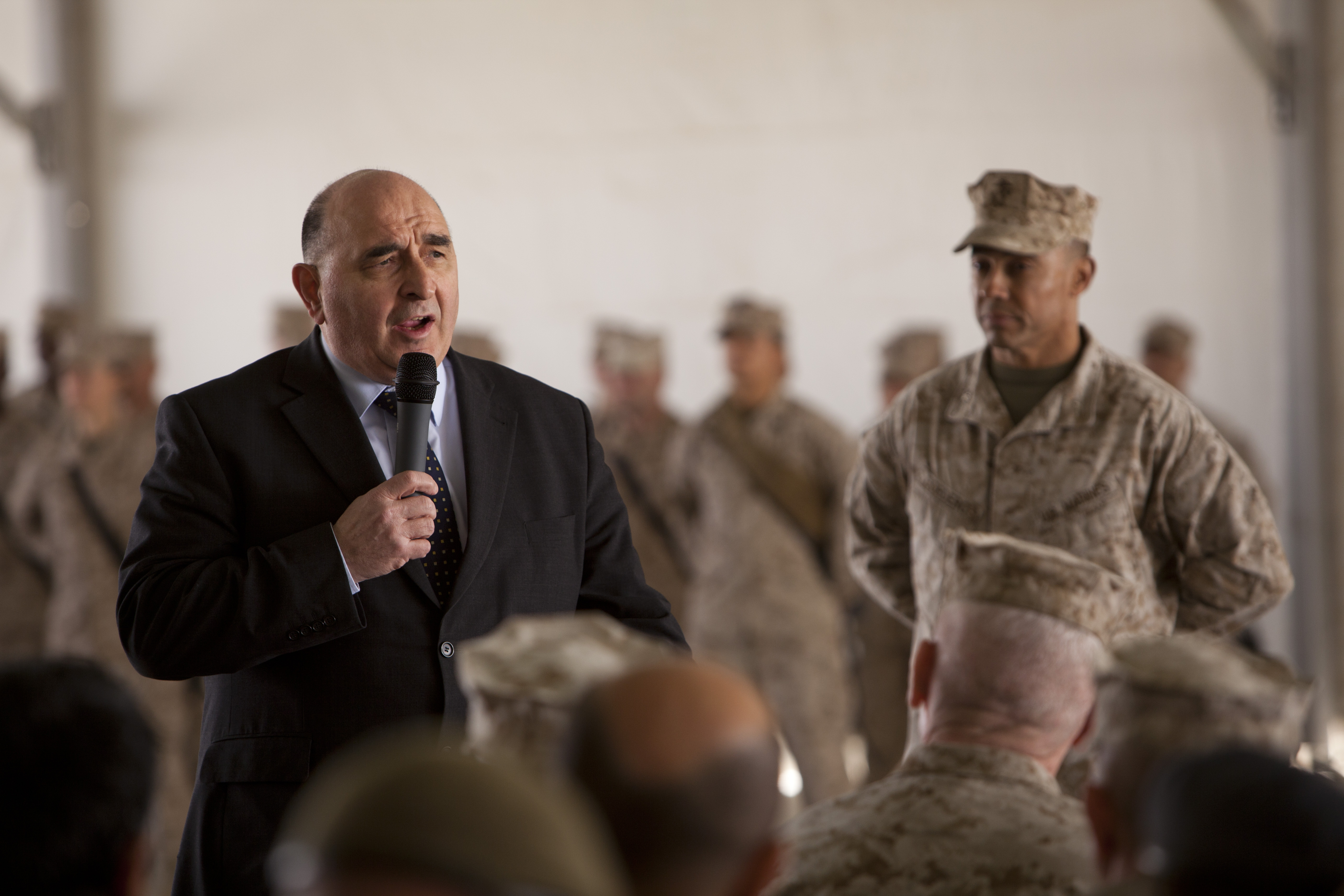

British Ambassador to Afghanistan
- In office 2010–2012
- Monarch: Elizabeth II
- Preceded by: Mark Sedwill
- Succeeded by: Richard Stagg

Personal details
- Born: 11 July 1953 (age 73) Edinburgh, Scotland
- Spouse: Vanessa Morrell
- Education: University of Dundee
- Occupation: Diplomat

Sir William Charters Patey, KCMG (born 11 July 1953) is a British retired diplomat. He was British Ambassador to Afghanistan from 2010 to 2012, and previously served as Ambassador to Sudan, to Iraq and to Saudi Arabia.

He retired from HM Diplomatic Service in April 2012 and was replaced by Sir Richard Stagg, formerly British High Commissioner to India. He has since worked in business.

== Early life ==
Patey attended Trinity Academy, Edinburgh, Scotland until 1971. He earned a Master of Arts (MA) from the University of Dundee in Dundee, Scotland.

== Career ==
Patey joined the FCO in 1975. He went to the Middle East Centre for Arabic Studies (MECAS) from 1977-8. From 2005-6 he was the Ambassador to Iraq and from 2002-5 the Ambassador to Sudan. Patey gave evidence to The Iraq Inquiry on 24 November 2009 and 5 January 2010. From May 2010 to April 2012, Patey was the British ambassador to Afghanistan.

He joined the consultancy Control Risks as Government and International Relations Adviser in July 2012 and became an Executive Director of HSBC Bank Middle East on 10 July 2012. Justifying British support for, and arms sales to, serial human rights violators in the Middle East in November 2012—that is, even in the face of the Arab Spring—Patey said, "The people in the Gulf will say, 'you of all people should understand why evolutionary change is better than revolutionary change'," referring to European revolutions.

He was appointed Chairman of Swindon Town F.C. on 15 October 2012.

Patey is a Governor and Distinguished Fellow of New Westminster College in New Westminster, British Columbia, Canada . He is a patron of the charity Kids for Kids, helping children in rural areas of Darfur, Sudan.

== Recognition ==
Already a Companion of the Order of St Michael and St George (CMG), Patey was appointed Knight Commander of the Order of St Michael and St George (KCMG) in the 2009 New Year Honours List.

== Personal life ==
He married Vanessa Morrell in 1978. They have two sons, William Rory and Thomas. Patey is an avid cinema goer and president of the St Margarets Film Club which was formed in the 1990s.
