= Michael Anthony Arthur =

British diplomat (born 1950)

Sir Michael Arthur KCMG
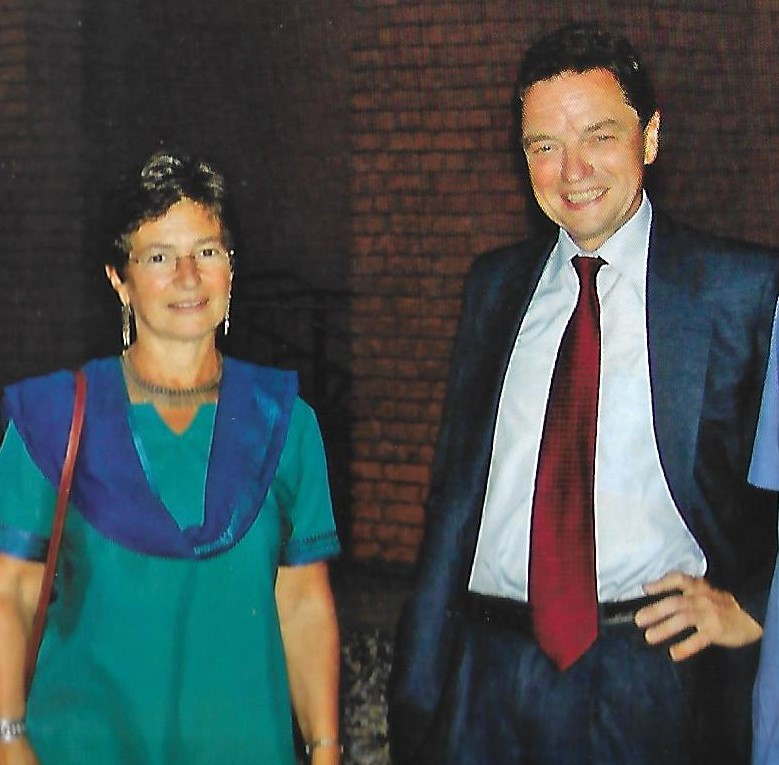
- Sir Michael and Lady Arthur dressed in shalwar kameez at The Doon School, India.

British Ambassador to Germany
- In office 2007–2010
- Monarch: Elizabeth II
- President: Horst Köhler
- Prime Minister: Gordon Brown
- Chancellor: Angela Merkel
- Preceded by: Sir Peter Torry
- Succeeded by: Sir Simon McDonald

British High Commissioner to India
- In office 2003–2007
- Monarch: Elizabeth II
- Preceded by: Sir Rob Young
- Succeeded by: Sir Richard Stagg

Personal details
- Born: Michael Anthony Arthur; 28 August 1950 (age 75) Vancouver, Canada
- Spouse: Plaxy Gillian Beatrice
- Children: 4
- Education: Watford Grammar and Rugby School
- Alma mater: Balliol College, Oxford

Sir Michael Anthony Arthur KCMG (born 28 August 1950) is a former senior British diplomat and was Her Majesty's British Ambassador to Germany between 2007 and 2010. Previously, he served as the UK's High Commissioner in New Delhi. He then spent 8 years as a Vice President of the Boeing Company, including 4 years on the Executive Council as President of Boeing International.

Arthur was succeeded as British Ambassador to Germany by Sir Simon McDonald (later Baron McDonald of Salford).

== Career ==
Arthur had previously worked in a number of positions within the Diplomatic Service, starting out in 1972 in the UK Mission to the United Nations, and moving in 1973 to the UK's Mission in Geneva working on the additional protocols to the Geneva Convention. Between 1981 and 1984, he was Private Secretary to the Lord Privy Seal and Minister of State in the Foreign Office, and in 1984 became First Secretary Political at the British Embassy in Bonn (then the administrative capital of West Germany). He was a Political Counselor at the Embassy in Paris from 1993 to 1997 and Deputy Head of Mission in Washington from 1999 to 2001.

In 2001, he was appointed Director General Europe and Economic at the Foreign Office and in 2003 succeeded Sir Rob Young as High Commissioner in New Delhi. He became Ambassador to Germany in 2007, succeeding Sir Peter Torry.

Arthur retired from HM Diplomatic Service in October 2010, being succeeded in Berlin by Sir Simon McDonald, a former British Ambassador to Israel and Head of Foreign and Defence Policy, Cabinet Office.

In 2013 Arthur joined Boeing UK and Ireland as a managing director, then appointed senior vice president of Boeing and president of Boeing International (the first ever non American on the Executive Council) from 22 April 2019 until January 2023

== Personal life ==
He was educated at Watford Grammar school and then Rugby School before going up to Balliol College Oxford, becoming a fluent French and German speaker. He is married to Plaxy Gillian Beatrice, and has four children.

== See also ==
- British Embassy, Berlin

Diplomatic posts
Preceded by Sir Rob Young	British High Commissioner to India; 2003–2007	Succeeded by Sir Richard Stagg
Preceded by Sir Peter Torry	British Ambassador to Germany; 2007–2010	Succeeded by Sir Simon McDonald
