= Walter Robert Haydon =

British ambassador

Sir Robin Haydon KCMG

British Ambassador to Ireland
- In office 21 July 1976 – 1980
- Monarch: Elizabeth II
- Prime Minister: James Callaghan
- Preceded by: Christopher Ewart-Biggs
- Succeeded by: Leonard Figg

Downing Street Press Secretary
- In office 1973–1974
- Prime Minister: Edward Heath
- Preceded by: Donald Maitland
- Succeeded by: Joe Haines

Personal details
- Born: Walter Robert Haydon; 29 May 1920
- Died: 1 December 1999 (aged 79)
- Spouse: Joan Elizabeth Tewson (m. 1943)
- Children: 3
- Education: Dover Grammar School

Military service
- Allegiance: United Kingdom
- Branch/service: British Army
- Years of service: 1939–1945
- Rank: Lieutenant
- Unit: Kent Yeomanry; Royal Artillery; V Force
- Battles/wars: World War II

Sir Walter Robert Haydon (29 May 1920 – 1 December 1999) always known as Robin, was a British former political aide, diplomat and ambassador who served as Downing Street Press Secretary under Edward Heath from 1973 to 1974.

== Early life ==
Robin Haydon was born in Wandsworth and educated at Dover Grammar School. He had hoped to follow in his father's (also called Walter) footsteps as a journalist, but at the outbreak of the World War II in 1939 he enlisted with the British army and would eventually be posted to India where he served behind enemy lines in Burma with V Force.

== Career ==
After the war in 1946 he joined the Foreign Service, and after a number of postings, including public relations officer to the British Mission to the United Nations in New York in 1961, he eventually became the British High Commissioner for Malawi (1971-1973) and then Malta (1974-1976), a position he relinquished when he was made British Ambassador to Ireland the day after the assignation of Christopher Ewart-Biggs in 1976. An attempt on his own life by the Provisional IRA took place in 1978 at Dublin Cathedral as he and his wife attended the Armistice Day service.

He was appointed CMG in 1970. Robin Haydon retired from the Civil Service in 1980 and was knighted (KCMG) that same year. After retirement he took on public relations work with the Imperial Group, and later Imperial Tobacco, until 1987 and was a member of the Reviewing Committee on the Export of Works of Art, from 1984 to 1989.

== Personal life ==
In 1943, he married Joan Elizabeth Tewson, whom he had met while serving in India. The union bore two daughters and a son. He was widowed in 1988, and he died in 1999.

Diplomatic posts
Preceded by Christopher Ewart-Biggs	British Ambassador to Ireland; 1976–1980	Succeeded by Leonard Figg
Government offices
Preceded by Donald Maitland	Downing Street Press Secretary; 1973–1974	Succeeded by Joe Haines
