= Leslie Monson =

British diplomat (1912–1993)

Sir William Bonnar Leslie Monson KCMG CB
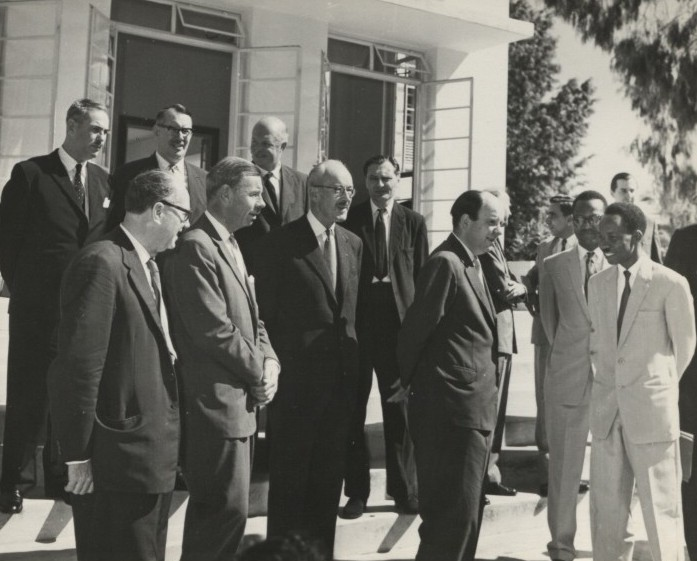
- Monson, back row, second left, with British officials on a visit to Tanganyika in 1959

British High Commissioner to Zambia
- In office 1964–1966
- Preceded by: Post established
- Succeeded by: Sir Laurence Pumphrey

Personal details
- Born: 28 May 1912
- Died: 3 July 1993 (aged 81) Blackheath, London
- Education: Hertford College, Oxford
- Occupation: Diplomat

Sir William Bonnar Leslie Monson (28 May 1912 – 3 July 1993) was a British diplomat who served as British High Commissioner to the Republic of Zambia from 1964 to 1966.

== Early life and education ==
Monson was born on 28 May 1912 in Edinburgh, the son of J. W. Monson, tax inspector, and Selina Leslie, née Stewart. He was educated at Edinburgh Academy and Hertford College, Oxford.

== Career ==
Monson joined the Civil Service in 1935 and entered the Dominions Office. In 1938 he became private secretary to the permanent under-secretary, Sir Edward Harding. In 1939, he transferred to the Colonial Office and in 1944 was serving as an assistant secretary and head of the production and marketing department. In 1947, he was seconded to the West African Council in Accra as chief secretary where he was involved in coordinating British policy in west Africa. He returned to the Colonial Office in 1951 as assistant under-secretary of state, and specialised in the trade in commodities in Africa, and was head of colonial delegations to international conferences on sugar, rubber, and tin, a post he held until 1964.

Monson was then appointed as Britain's first High Commissioner to the Republic of Zambia after the country became independent of the United Kingdom in 1964, serving in the post from 1964 to 1966. According to The Times, President Kenneth Kaunda specially requested Monson's appointment and that, "His appointment to the new post in Lusaka reflected the rapport he had established with emerging states in Africa and their leaders."

In 1967, he was appointed under-secretary at the Commonwealth Office involved in supervising its sub-Saharan Africa departments and in dealing with the consequences of Rhodesia's Unilateral Declaration of Independence in 1965. He retired in 1972.

== Personal life and death ==
Monson married Helen Isobel Browne in 1948. There were no children. Monson was made a Knight of St. John in 1975, and went on to serve as Director of the Overseas Relations Branch of the St John Ambulance from 1975 to 1981.

Monson died on 3 July 1993 at his home in Blackheath, London, aged 81.

== Honours ==
Monson was appointed Companion of the Order of St Michael and St George (CMG) in the 1950 Birthday Honours, and promoted to Knight Commander (KCMG) in the 1965 Birthday Honours. He was appointed Companion of the Order of the Bath (CB) in the 1964 Birthday Honours. In 1975, he was appointed Knight of the Order of the Hospital of St John of Jerusalem (KStJ).

== See also ==
- United Kingdom–Zambia relations

Diplomatic posts
Preceded by New office	British High Commissioner to Zambia; 1964–1966	Succeeded by Sir Laurence Pumphrey
