= Jock Duncan (diplomat) =

John Spenser Ritchie "Jock" Duncan CMG MBE (26 July 1921 – 12 September 2006) was the last member of the Sudan Political Service to leave at independence in 1956. He then became a diplomat and was British Consul General in Muscat, High Commissioner to Zambia, Ambassador to Morocco, and High Commissioner in the Bahamas.

== Career ==
John Spenser Ritchie Duncan grew up in Dundee, the son of the minister of Dundee Parish Church. He was educated at the High School of Dundee and the University of Edinburgh where he read Hebrew and Arabic. At the outbreak of World War II he volunteered to be a fighter pilot but failed the Royal Air Force medical because he could not stand on one leg with his eyes shut without feeling giddy. He served with the Essex Regiment but "without pay whilst specially employed". In 1942–43 he held a temporary commission as bimbashi in the Sudan Defence Force. He then joined the Sudan Political Service, the civilian administration of Anglo-Egyptian Sudan, and was appointed assistant District Commissioner at En Nahud. In 1946 he was transferred to the Upper Nile province, first as assistant District Commissioner at Waat and in 1947–50 as District Commissioner at Fangak. During this time he learned the Nuer language and wrote a book on Nuer grammar.

Duncan left Sudan when it became an independent state in 1956, and joined the Foreign Office, serving as Political Agent in Doha, as director of the then British Information Services in New York City, as Consul-General for the Sultanate of Muscat and Oman and as Minister in the British High Commission at Canberra. He was then appointed High Commissioner to Zambia 1971–74, Ambassador to Morocco 1975–78 and finally High Commissioner to The Bahamas 1978–81.

== Publications ==
- The Sudan: A Record of Achievement, Blackwood, Edinburgh, 1952
- The Sudan's Path to Independence, Blackwood, Edinburgh, 1957

== Honours ==
John Duncan was appointed MBE in the 1953 Coronation Honours and CMG in the Queen's Birthday Honours of 1967.

== Offices held ==
Diplomatic posts
Preceded by Laurence Pumphrey	High Commissioner to Zambia; 1971–1974	Succeeded by Stephen Miles
Preceded by Ronald Bailey	Ambassador Extraordinary and Plenipotentiary to Morocco; 1975–1978	Succeeded by Simon Dawbarn
Preceded by Peter Mennell	High Commissioner to The Bahamas; 1978–1981	Succeeded by Achilles Papadopoulos
