= Cyril Stanley Pickard =

British diplomat (1917–1992)

Sir Cyril Pickard KCMG
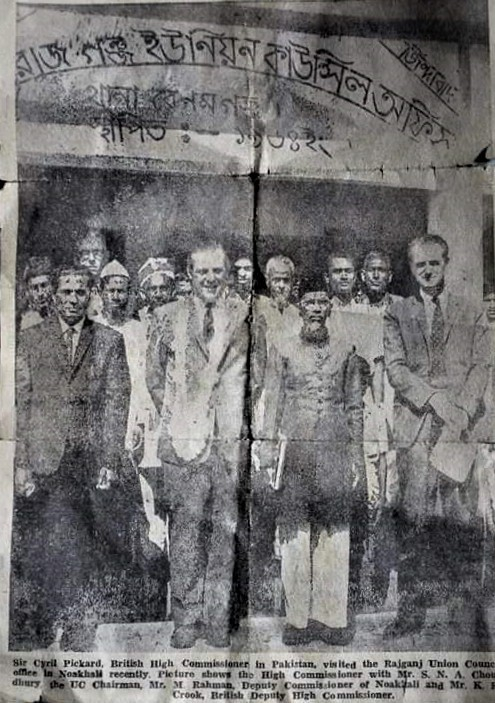
- Pickard with Syed Nur Alam Chowdhury at the Rajganj Union Council in Begumganj, Noakhali, East Pakistan (now Bangladesh).
- Monarch: Elizabeth II

High Commissioner of the United Kingdom to Pakistan
- In office 1966–1971
- Preceded by: Morrice James, Baron Saint Brides
- Succeeded by: Laurence Pumphrey

Personal details
- Born: 1917
- Died: 1992 (aged 74–75)
- Cause of death: Parkinson's disease
- Education: Alleyn's School Dulwich.
- Occupation: Diplomat

Sir Cyril Stanley Pickard KCMG (1917–1992) was a British diplomat who served as British High Commissioner to Pakistan and Nigeria.

== Biography ==
His ancestors hailed from Picardy in France. He joined the Home Office in 1939, and served in the Royal Artillery from 1940 to 1941. After his service, he was appointed to various posts in the Office of the Secretary of State in Cairo, and with UNRRA.

Transferred to the Commonwealth Relations Office in 1948, he held appointments in India, Australia, New Zealand, and Cyprus as Acting High Commissioner, before becoming British high Commissioner in Pakistan from 1966 to 1971, and Nigeria 1971 to 1974. As High Commissioner in Pakistan, he visited Noakhali, East Pakistan where he had a notable encounter with Syed Nur Alam Chowdhury, the erstwhile President and Chairman of the Rajganj Union Council.

After his retirement he took an active role in the work of the Royal Commonwealth Society. He died from Parkinson's disease in 1992.

He was appointed a Companion of the Order of St Michael and St George (CMG) by Elizabeth II, whilst he was an Assistant Under-secretary of State in the Commonwealth Relations Office, during the 1964 New Year Honours. In the 1966 Birthday Honours, he was awarded as Knight Commander of the Order of St Michael and St George (KCMG) by Elizabeth II, whilst he was stationed at Karachi.

Diplomatic posts
Preceded by Morrice James, Baron Saint Brides	High Commissioner to Pakistan; 1966-1971	Succeeded by Laurence Pumphrey
