= Kate Ewart-Biggs =

British Council executive (born 1967)

Kate Ewart-Biggs OBE
- Born: 1967 (age 58–59)
- Education: University of Edinburgh
- Employer: British Council
- Parent(s): Christopher Ewart-Biggs and Jane Ewart-Biggs, Baroness Ewart-Biggs

The Honourable Kate Ewart-Biggs OBE (born November 1967) is Deputy Chief Executive of the British Council.

== Personal life ==
Her father was Christopher Ewart-Biggs, a British diplomat who was killed by the IRA in Dublin in 1976. Her mother was Jane Ewart-Biggs, Baroness Ewart-Biggs, née Jane Randall, who died in 1992 when Kate was 25.

Ewart-Briggs studied social anthropology at the University of Edinburgh. She appeared on Desert Island Discs on 17 July 2022. She has a daughter.

== Career with British Council ==
Ewart-Biggs joined the British Council after working help street children around the world in places such as Brazil, South Africa and Indonesia. She has been posted by the council to Uganda, Tanzania, Central and Eastern Europe and in Egypt. She was Regional Head for the Middle East and North Africa. Before she was Deputy Chief Executive, she was Director Global Network and managed relationships with the British Government departments.
