= Nicholas Fenn =

British diplomat

Sir Nicholas Maxted Fenn GCMG (19 February 1936 – 18 September 2016) was a British diplomat. He was High Commissioner to India from 1991 to 1996.

== Life ==
Nicholas Fenn was born in east London, the son of Professor J. Eric Fenn and Kathleen (née Harrison). He was educated at Kingswood School in Bath and, following national service in the Royal Air Force, at Peterhouse, Cambridge. While at university he was chair of the Cambridge University branch of the Campaign for Nuclear Disarmament. He lived in Marden, Kent.

== Career ==
Fenn entered the Foreign Office in 1959 and worked as secretaries at various posts overseas, spokesperson at the FCO and as counselor at the British Embassy in Peking. Fenn was fluent in Burmese after undergoing training in 1960 and assigned to Burma in the early 1960s.

Fenn's ambassadorships included Rangoon (1982–86) and Dublin (1986–91). Fenn retired in 1996. Following his career with the diplomatic service, Fenn was chief executive of Marie Curie, from 1997 to 2000; after retiring as chief executive he continued as chair of its council of trustees until 2006.

From 1972 to 1975 he was with the Energy Department (as Deputy Head) in the Foreign Office and at the Royal College of Defence Studies in 1978.

Fenn was appointed a Companion of the Order of St Michael and St George (CMG) in the 1980 Birthday Honours, promoted to Knight Commander of the Order (KCMG) in the 1989 New Year Honours, and again to Knight Grand Cross of the Order (GCMG) in the 1995 Birthday Honours.

Diplomatic posts
Preceded by Charles Booth	British Ambassador to Burma; 1982–1986	Succeeded by Martin Morland
Preceded by Alan Goodison	British Ambassador to Ireland; 1986–1991	Succeeded by David Blatherwick
Preceded by Sir David Goodall	High Commissioner to India; 1991–1996	Succeeded by Sir David Gore-Booth
