= David Reddaway =

British diplomat (born 1953)

Sir David Reddaway KCMG MBE
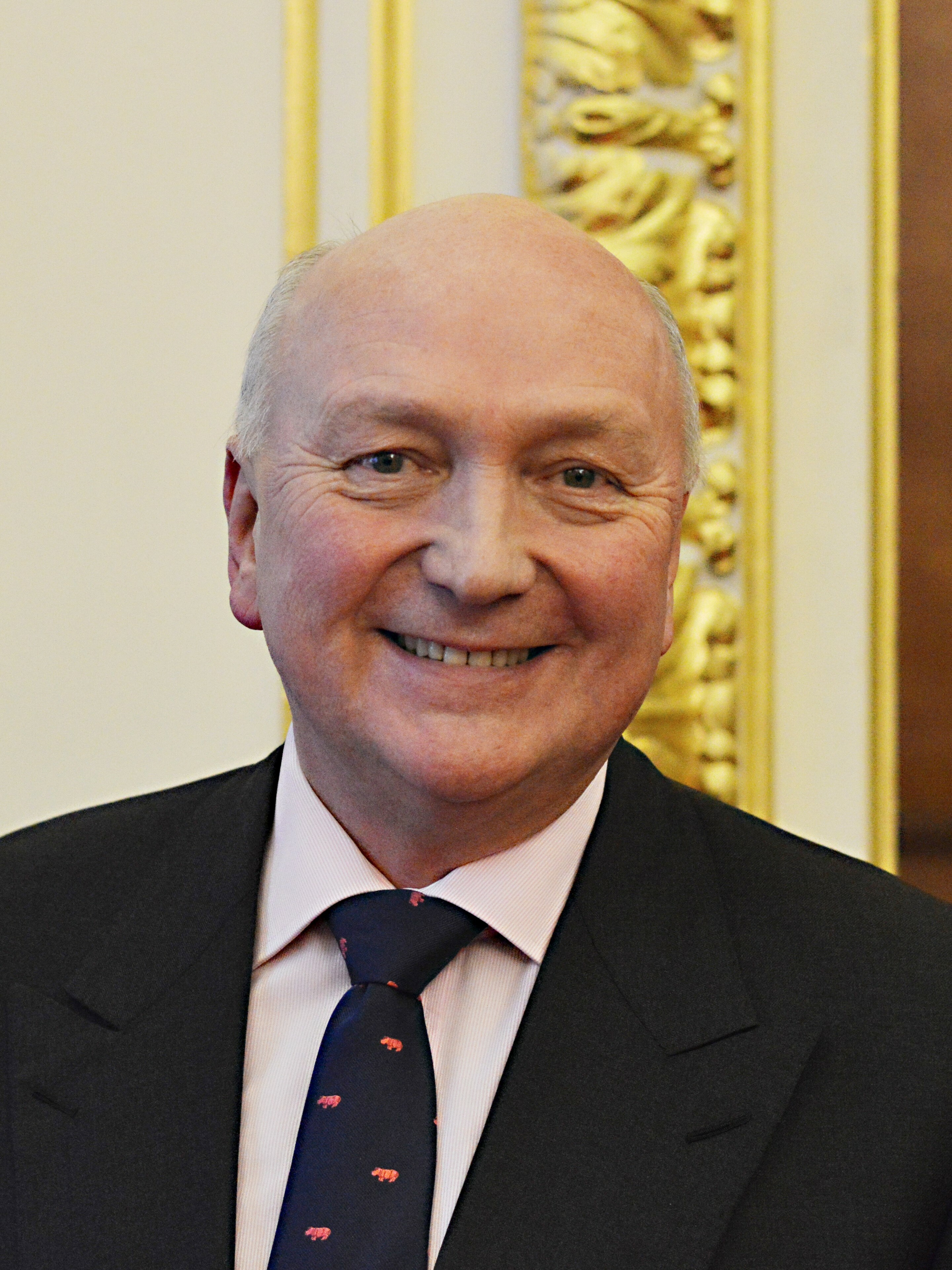
- Reddaway in 2016

British Ambassador to Turkey
- In office 2009–2014
- Monarch: Elizabeth II
- Prime Minister: Gordon Brown; David Cameron
- Preceded by: Nick Baird
- Succeeded by: Richard Moore

British Ambassador to Ireland
- In office 2006–2009
- Monarch: Elizabeth II
- Prime Minister: Tony Blair; Gordon Brown
- Preceded by: Stewart Eldon
- Succeeded by: Julian King

British High Commissioner to Canada
- In office 2003–2006
- Monarch: Elizabeth II
- Prime Minister: Tony Blair
- Preceded by: Andrew Burns
- Succeeded by: Anthony Cary

Personal details
- Parent: Norman Reddaway (father)
- Education: Oundle School
- Alma mater: University of Cambridge

Sir David Norman Reddaway KCMG MBE (born 26 April 1953) is a retired British diplomat who was High Commissioner to Canada and Ambassador to Ireland and Turkey.

== Career ==
Reddaway was born in Ottawa, Ontario, Canada, where his father, Norman Reddaway, also a British diplomat, was posted at the time. He attended King's College School, Cambridge and Oundle School, then studied history at Fitzwilliam College, Cambridge, where his grandfather, the historian William Fiddian Reddaway, had served as Censor. (Note: Between 1869 and 1966 Fitzwilliam Hall/House/College did not appoint a "Master". Many of the supervisory and disciplinary responsibilities conferred by other Oxbridge colleges on a "Master" were instead allocated to an individual identified, at Fitzwilliam, as the "Censor".) He joined the Foreign and Commonwealth Office in 1975. His career has included assignments to Iran (during the Iranian revolution), India, Spain, Argentina and Afghanistan.

In 2002, his appointment as British ambassador to Iran was rejected by the Iranian government, with some Iranian newspapers incorrectly accusing him of being "a Jew and a member of MI6". He speaks fluent Persian.

He served as High Commissioner to Canada between 2003 and 2006. In 2006 he was appointed the British Ambassador to Ireland and presented his diplomatic credentials to the president of Ireland, Mary McAleese on 12 September 2006, succeeding Stewart Eldon as the ambassador.

He was appointed to Turkey in 2009, and left Ankara in January 2014.

Following his retirement from the FCO, he was chief executive and clerk of the Goldsmiths' company from 2016 to 2023.

Reddaway was appointed MBE in the Queen's Birthday Honours of 1980, CMG in 1993, and knighted KCMG in the 2013 Birthday Honours "for services to British diplomacy and furthering UK interests in Turkey".

Reddaway had the honour of celebrating his 64th birthday at a Chris de Burgh concert. De Burgh announced Sir David's birthday to a packed audience at the London Palladium on April 26, 2017, and gave a brief account of his role as a diplomat. He then sang the Beatles song 'When I'm 64.'

== Personal ==
David Reddaway married Roshan Firouz in the late summer of 1981, thereby gaining Louise Firouz as his mother in law. The marriage was followed by the births of the couple's two sons and one daughter.

== Career ==
- 1975–1977: Foreign and Commonwealth Office Desk Officer for East Germany and the Council of Europe
- 1977–1980: Tehran: 3rd Secretary Commercial; 2nd later 1st Secretary Political
- 1980–1984: Madrid, 1st Secretary Political
- 1984–1986: Foreign and Commonwealth Office: Falkland Islands Department, Desk Officer
- 1986–1988: Foreign and Commonwealth Office: Private Secretary to Minister(s) of State
- 1988–1990: New Delhi, 1st Secretary Political
- 1990–1993: Tehran, chargé d'affaires
- 1993–1997: Buenos Aires, Minister & Deputy Head of Mission
- 1997–1999: FCO: Head of Southern European Department
- 1999–2001: FCO: Director Public Services
- 2002–2002: London, UK Special Representative for Afghanistan
- 2002–2003: Harvard, Visiting Fellow
- 2003–2006: Ottawa, High Commissioner
- 2006–2009: Dublin, Ambassador
- 2009–2014: Ankara, Ambassador
- 2016–2023: Chief Executive and Clerk, The Goldsmiths' Company

== Arms ==
Coat of arms of David Reddaway

Notes
Granted 1 December 2021 (183/331)
Crest
Upon a Helm with a Wreath Or and Gules Issuing from a Circlet of Leopard’s Faces four manifest Or a demi Persian Ibex proper holding between the legs a Tulip Flower Gules slipped Vert. Mantled Gules doubled Or.
Escutcheon
Per pall Or Azure and Gules in fess two Castles Or enflamed proper and in base a like Castle in chief a Sprig of three Maple Leaves slips conjoined on one stem Gules and veined Or.
Motto
The Best From Old And New

== Notes ==
Diplomatic posts
Preceded by Andrew Burns	British High Commissioner to Canada; 2003–2006	Succeeded by Anthony Cary
Preceded by Stewart Eldon	British Ambassador to Ireland; 2006–2009	Succeeded by Julian King
Preceded by Nick Baird	British Ambassador to Turkey; 2009–2014	Succeeded by Richard Moore
