= List of high commissioners of the United Kingdom to India =

His Britannic Majesty’s high commissioner to the India
- Royal arms of His Majesty's Government

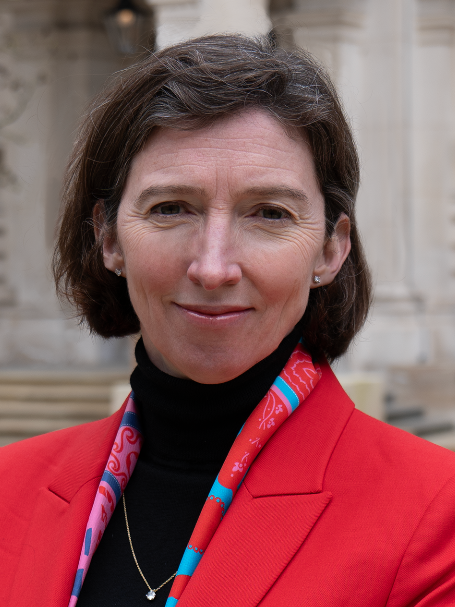
- Incumbent; Lindy Cameron since 11 April 2024
- Foreign, Commonwealth and Development Office; High Commission of the United Kingdom, New Delhi
- Style: Her Excellency; Madam Ambassador
- Reports to: Secretary of State for Foreign, Commonwealth and Development Affairs
- Appointer: The King on advice of the prime minister
- Term length: At His Majesty's pleasure
- Inaugural holder: Terence Shone; High Commissioner to British India
- Formation: 1946
- Website: British High Commission – New Delhi

Countries belonging to the Commonwealth of Nations exchange high commissioners rather than ambassadors. Though there are a few technical differences (for instance, whereas ambassadors present their diplomatic credentials to the host country's head of state, high commissioners are accredited to the head of government), they are in practice the same office. The following persons have served as British high commissioner to India.

== List of high commissioners ==
=== British India (1946–1947) ===
- 1946–1947: Sir Terence Shone

=== Dominion of India (1947–1950) ===
- 1947–1948: Sir Terence Shone
- 1948–1950: Sir Archibald Nye

=== Republic of India (1950–present) ===
- 1950–1952: Sir Archibald Edward Nye
- 1952–1955: Sir Alexander Clutterbuck
- 1955–1960: Malcolm MacDonald
- 1960–1965: Sir Paul Gore-Booth
- 1965–1968: John Freeman
- 1968–1971: Sir Morrice James
- 1971–1973: Sir Terence Garvey
- 1974–1976: Sir Michael Walker
- 1977–1982: Sir John Thomson
- 1982–1987: Sir Robert Wade-Gery
- 1987–1991: Sir David Goodall
- 1991–1996: Sir Nicholas Fenn
- 1996–1998: Sir David Gore-Booth
- 1999–2003: Sir Rob Young
- 2003–2007: Sir Michael Arthur
- 2007–2011: Sir Richard Stagg
- 2011–2015: Sir James Bevan
- 2016-2020: Sir Dominic Asquith
- 2020–2021: Sir Philip Barton
- 2021–2024: Sir Alexander Ellis
- April 2024–present: Lindy Cameron

== See also ==
- High Commission of the United Kingdom, New Delhi
