= Norman Reddaway =

British civil servant and diplomat (1918–1999)

George Frank Norman Reddaway CBE (2 May 1918 – 12 October 1999) was a British civil servant and diplomat.

== Career ==
The younger son of William Fiddian Reddaway (1872-1949), Professor of History at Cambridge University, Norman Reddaway attended King's College School, Oundle School, and later gained a Double First in Modern Languages at Cambridge. He joined the British army as a private on the outbreak of war in 1939. He spent most of the wartime years with the GHQ Liaison Regiment, leaving in 1946 with the rank of lieutenant-colonel. In 1946, after serving with the Allied Control Commission, he joined the British Foreign Office.

Under Under-Secretary of State Christopher Mayhew, Reddaway co-founded the Information Research Department (IRD), a secret Cold War propaganda department of the British Foreign Office. Mayhew and Reddaway had served together in GHQ Liaison Regiment.

Reddaway was also instrumental in providing anti-Communist propaganda in Indonesia during the 30 September Movement. The Foreign Office gave Reddaway a budget of £100,000 and told him "to do anything [he] could do to get rid of Sukarno". At the end of his career in the UK Foreign Office, he took charge of its information departments, which involved liaising with the BBC overseas services.

From 1974 to 1978, Reddaway was British Ambassador to Poland.

== Personal ==
Norman Reddaway's son David also became an ambassador.
