= Richard Stagg =

British diplomat (born 1955)

His Excellency Sir Richard Stagg KCMG
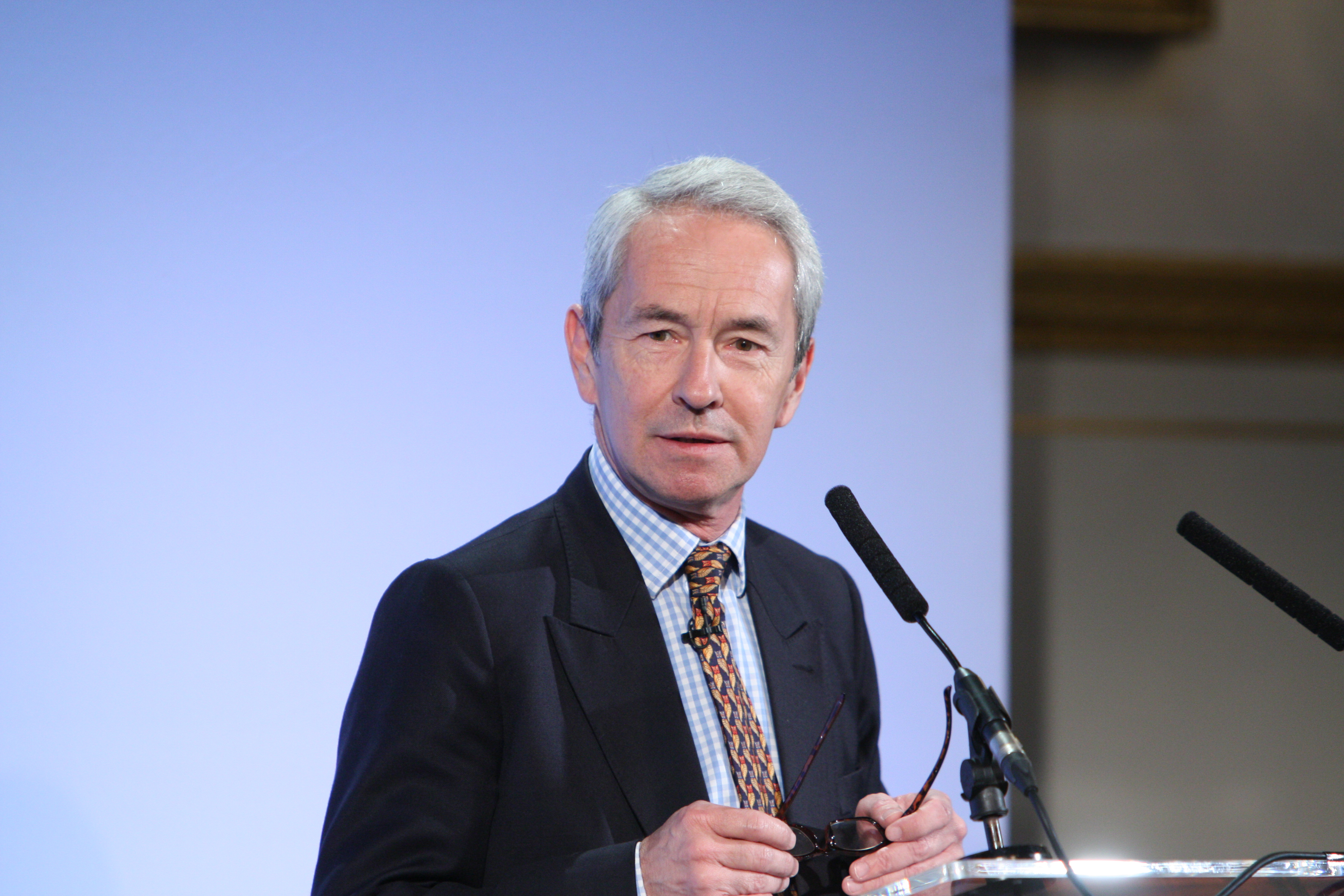
- Stagg at the London Conference on Afghanistan on 4 December 2014

British Ambassador to Afghanistan
- In office 2012–2015
- Monarch: Elizabeth II
- Prime Minister: David Cameron
- Preceded by: Sir William Patey
- Succeeded by: Dame Karen Pierce

British High Commissioner to India
- In office 2007–2011
- Monarch: Elizabeth II
- Prime Minister: Gordon Brown; David Cameron
- Preceded by: Sir Michael Arthur
- Succeeded by: Sir James Bevan

Personal details
- Born: 27 September 1955 (age 70)
- Children: 5
- Education: Winchester College
- Alma mater: Oriel College, Oxford
- Occupation: Diplomat

Sir Richard Stagg KCMG (born 27 September 1955) is a retired British diplomat who was ambassador to Bulgaria, high commissioner to India and ambassador to Afghanistan.

== Education ==
Charles Richard Vernon Stagg was educated at Winchester College and Oriel College, Oxford where he read history.

== Career ==
On joining the British Foreign Office, Stagg worked in the Department responsible for Hong Kong – on his second day the Hong Kong Police mutinied, adding to the challenge of managing Britain’s last major overseas territory.

He then spent three years in Bulgaria, and a further three years in the Netherlands at a time when the country was in uproar over the planned deployment of US missiles.

Stagg was then seconded to the Secretariat of the European Council to help establish a new organisation designed to coordinate more effectively the foreign policy of the members of the European Union. He returned to London to work on policy towards the Soviet Union in the three years leading up to its collapse and the liberation of Eastern Europe – the goal of British policy for the previous four decades.

After two years as British Press Spokesman in Brussels during the Maastricht negotiations (which led to a landmark treaty paving the way for the Euro), he became a Private Secretary to the British Foreign Secretary Douglas Hurd.

From 1996–1998 Stagg was head of the Foreign Office Department responsible for the Enlargement of the EU – negotiations with 10 candidate countries were started in early 1998 under the UK’s Presidency of the Council of the EU.

Stagg was appointed British Ambassador to Bulgaria in 1998 and served there for three years during the war over the future of Kosovo.

Between 2001 and 2007 Stagg was responsible for the Foreign Office’s global consular, visa and information work; and for the global estate, IT and HR. He was a member of the Foreign Office's management board from 2002 to 2007.

Stagg was British High Commissioner to India from 2007 to 2011, and Ambassador to Afghanistan from April 2012 until he retired in early 2015.

In September 2019 he took up the post of Warden of Winchester College, chairing its board of governors.

== Personal life ==
Stagg is married with five children - 3 sons and 2 daughters.

Diplomatic posts
| Preceded by Roger Short | Ambassador to Bulgaria; 1998–2001 | Succeeded by Ian Soutar |
| Preceded by Sir Michael Arthur | High Commissioner to India; 2007–2011 | Succeeded by Sir James Bevan |
| Preceded by Sir William Patey | Ambassador to Afghanistan; 2012–2015 | Succeeded by Dame Karen Pierce |
