= Nicholas Barrington =

British diplomat (1934-)

Sir Nicholas Barrington KCMG CVO

British High Commissioner to Pakistan
- In office 1989–1994

British Ambassador to Pakistan
- In office 1987–1989

British Ambassador to Iran
- In office 1981–1983

Personal details
- Born: Nicholas John Barrington; 23 July 1934 (age 92) Essex, United Kingdom
- Education: Repton School; Clare College, Cambridge
- Profession: Diplomat

Military service
- Branch/service: British Army

Nicholas John Barrington (born 23 July 1934) is a British diplomat and author, who served as the British Ambassador to Iran from 1981 to 1983 and the British High Commissioner to Pakistan from 1987 to 1994.

== Early life and education ==
Nicholas John Barrington was born on 23 July 1934 in Essex, to Eric Alan Barrington and Mildred (née Bill).

He was educated at Repton School and served two years National service before attending Clare College, Cambridge.

== Diplomatic career ==
After graduating from Cambridge, Nicholas joined the diplomatic service. He began his career in 1957 and travelled to the remote areas of Afghanistan in the 1960s. He was described as the "Ringmaster of the Summit" by The Times in 1984, for organising the 10th G7 summit at the Lancaster House.

On 2 October 1989 Barrington became the High Commissioner to Pakistan as the country rejoined the Commonwealth. In September 1991 he accompanied Diana, Princess of Wales during her visit to Pakistan, which he had suggested and planned.

== Awards and honours ==
Barrington was elected an honorary fellow of Clare College, Cambridge, in 1992.

The Pakistani government awarded him the Sitara-e-Quaid-e-Azam for services to Pakistan, in 2007.

== Personal life ==
Barrington remained a lifelong bachelor.
