= Paul Lever =

British ambassador

Sir Paul Lever KCMG

British Ambassador to Germany
- In office 1997–2003
- Monarch: Elizabeth II
- President: Roman Herzog; Johannes Rau
- Prime Minister: Tony Blair
- Chancellor: Helmut Kohl; Gerhard Schröder
- Preceded by: Christopher Meyer
- Succeeded by: Sir Peter Torry

Personal details
- Born: 31 March 1944 (age 82)
- Education: St Paul's School, London
- Alma mater: The Queen's College, Oxford

Sir Paul Lever KCMG (born 31 March 1944) is a retired British ambassador.

== Career ==
Paul Lever was educated at St Paul's School, London and The Queen's College, Oxford. He joined the Diplomatic Service on leaving Oxford in 1966. After a year at the Foreign and Commonwealth Office (FCO) he was sent to Finland to learn Finnish and served at the embassy in Helsinki 1967–71. He later served as chef de cabinet to Christopher Tugendhat, then vice-president of the EEC, and as head successively of the UN, Defence, and Security Policy departments in the FCO. He was head of the UK delegation to the Conference on Security and Co-operation in Europe in Vienna, with the rank of Ambassador, 1990–92; assistant Under-Secretary at the FCO 1992–94; chairman of the Joint Intelligence Committee 1994–96; Director for EU and Economic Affairs at the FCO 1996–97; and Ambassador to Germany 1997–2003.

Lever retired from the Diplomatic Service in 2003 and was Global Development Director, RWE Thames Water, 2003–06 and Chairman of the Royal United Services Institute 2004–09.

== Book: Berlin Rules ==
His book Berlin Rules: Europe and the German Way (2017) argued that Germany is the dominant power in the European Union, and uses that power to protect the German economy. Lever argues that a federal Europe seems nonthreatening to federal Germany, and by embracing pan-Europeanism they can escape their past. In Berlin Rules Lever points to the problems that are obvious in the vision for the EU's future that is advanced by Joschka Fischer and Wolfgang Schäuble.

== Honours ==
Lever was appointed CMG in 1991 and knighted KCMG in the 1998 New Year Honours. He was awarded an honorary LLD degree by Birmingham University in 2001 and an honorary fellowship of his alma mater, The Queen's College, Oxford, in 2006.

== Public speeches and books ==
- Europa in zehn Jahren: wie wird es aussehen?. Vortrag. Hamburg : Übersee-Club, 2002
- Berlin Rules: Europe and the German Way. Tauris, 2017 ISBN 9781784539290

Diplomatic posts
Preceded by Michael Edes	Head of Delegation to the CSCE; 1990–1992	Succeeded by Terence Wood
Preceded by Christopher Meyer	Ambassador to Germany; 1997–2003	Succeeded by Sir Peter Torry
Government offices
Preceded by Dame Pauline Neville-Jones	Chairman of the Joint Intelligence Committee; 1994–1996	Succeeded by Sir Colin Budd
