= Louise Firouz =

Iranian horse breeder

Louise Firouz (née Laylin)
Personal information
- Born: December 24, 1933 Washington, D.C., United States
- Died: May 25, 2008 (aged 74) Gonbad-e Kavus, Iran
- Occupation: Trainer/Breeder

Horse racing career
- Sport: Horse racing

Louise Firouz (née Laylin), was an American-born, Iranian horse breeder and researcher who rediscovered and helped to preserve the Caspian horse, a breed believed to be the ancestor of the Arab and other types of what are called "hot-blooded" (agile and spirited) horses, and previously thought to have been extinct for 1,300 years.

Remembered as a "phenomenon; a charming, intelligent, adventurous, American woman", she married a Persian prince from the Qajar dynasty and together they ran a horse breeding programme and riding school and raised a family through revolution, war and intrigue. That the horse now exists in sustainable numbers in several countries worldwide (including Australia, America, New Zealand and Britain) is considered largely due to her efforts. Firouz has been dubbed "Iran's lady of horses". She died in 2008 in Gonbad having lived more than half a century in northern Iran.

== Early life ==
Louise Elizabeth Laylin was born in Washington DC; her father was an international lawyer who owned a farm at Great Falls, Virginia. Eventually Louise's parents divorced. After a short, unhappy stint in New York City her mother bought a small farm in New Hampshire. According to Firouz:

Our farm was ten miles away on a dirt road with nothing else in sight except pastures, forest and deer. My brothers, John and David, were sent off to boarding school while I was enrolled in the local grammar school. At first, when the weather was fine, my Mother drove me to school but when the snows started we were stuck. We bought a small Morgan mare, a sleigh and a buggy and this was our transportation. Getting up in the dark each morning to hitch up the mare and drive the ten miles to school has given me a lifelong aversion to arising in the dark.

She moved on to a private school in nearby Peterborough but still had to drive her mare Rhoda to Hancock, put her in the church stable and take a taxi for the next 12 miles, repeating the process each evening. Eventually, she passed the College Board exams in Latin, Maths and English and was accepted by Cornell. However, her inability to master physics mean that she was rejected as a candidate for Veterinary College, instead studying classics and English.

Along with her brother she applied to do a junior year abroad at the American University of Beirut, where she was crowned as 'Snow Queen of Lebanon' 1954, but by a series of misunderstandings she found herself expelled from the university.

With no responsibility to study for the rest of the year, she took a job at Khayats bookstore, editing in their publishing business and also retraining horses at the Beirut race track. Before returning to Cornell to finish her degree, she took a brief trip to Tehran where she and her brother were met by a friend who introduced them to Narcy Firouz, a Yale-trained civil engineer and 'prince' descended from the Qajar dynasty that ruled Iran from 1779 to 1925.

== Further investigations and breeding programmes ==
During this first trip Firouz rescued 3 such horses, initially malnourished and covered with ticks, whose former owners had misused and over-worked them having no idea of the ancient breeds' near extinction. "Rest and good feeding produced immediate results, and gentle treatment soon overcame their initial suspicions and fears," she wrote in 1966. "They became affectionate and interested companions for children, and delightful rides. They are built to carry the weight of a child with the gait of a horse, and, except at full gallop, the speed of a horse, as I have established at our farm in Tehran. They could, in fact, become the perfect children's ponies, if steps were taken to preserve the breed, which, I fear, is in serious danger of extinction."

Firouz estimated that there were only 50 Caspian horses along the whole southern coast of the Caspian Sea — about 30 of those occupying an area of 2,000 square miles (5,200 km^{2}) between Amol, Babol and Kiakola. She acquired six stallions and seven mares and founded a breeding herd. These horses today remain the breed-standard for the Caspian Horse.

Louise and her husband financed the breeding programme themselves, but in 1970 a Royal Horse Society of Iran (RHS) was formed, with the Crown Prince, Prince Reza Pahlavi, as its patron, to protect and maintain Iran's native breeds. Between 1971 and 1976 Firouz — encouraged by the Duke of Edinburgh, who took a great interest in the Caspian breed after visiting the Royal Horse Society — exported to Europe some 26 Caspian horses of different bloodlines; these constituted the European Formation Herd. In 1974 the RHS took complete control of Firouz's remaining horses, then numbering 23.

== The Iranian Revolution – 1979 ==
After the Iranian Revolution of 1979 the Firouzes were arrested and imprisoned, Louise for a few weeks but husband Narcy for six months. Much of their fortune was confiscated. Firouz had to sell her silver and jewels to feed her family during this time, but she gradually rebuilt her life, and was eventually able to establish a new herd of Caspian and Turkoman horses.

== Caspian horse legacy ==
Firouz's efforts to save the Caspian horses from starvation and slaughter by exportation during the early years of the Iranian Revolution meant that a total of 19 foundation lines have been exported around the world (through 9 stallions and 17 mares).

The British Caspian Trust, which had evolved from the Caspian Stud UK, original recipient of some of her Iran-bred horses, has played a role in the breed's survival, keeping detailed records of horses and preventing inbreeding by advocating the cyclic crossing method whereby each foundation mare was bred to a different foundation stallion.

== Death ==
Firouz died on May 25, 2008, at a hospital near her home in northeastern Iran. She had lung and liver failure.

== Family ==
Louise and Narcy were married at the farm, Hidden Springs, in Virginia and had two daughters and a son. One daughter, Roshan, married (and then divorced) British diplomat David Reddaway.

== See also ==
- Iranian culture
- Iranian women's movement
