= Stewart Eldon =

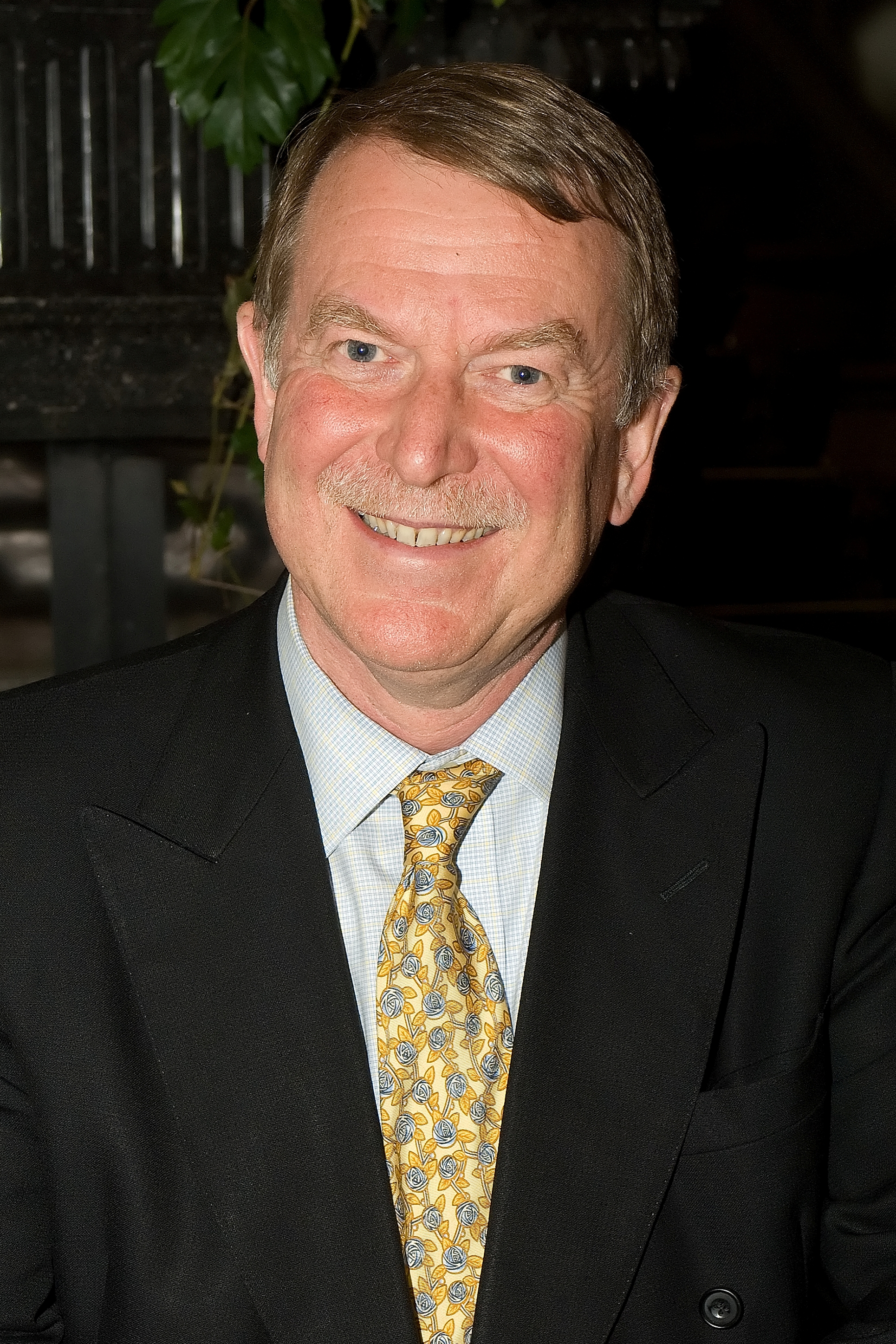
Stewart Eldon in 2009

Sir Stewart Eldon KCMG OBE is a former Permanent Representative of the United Kingdom to NATO.

== Education ==
Eldon attended Christ's College, Cambridge and graduated in 1974 with a degree in electrical sciences.

== Career ==
Eldon spent nearly 35 years in the British Diplomatic Service, serving as UK Deputy Permanent Representative to the UN in New York City from 1998–2002 and as British Ambassador to Ireland from 2003-06. He was knighted in 2009. His last post was as Permanent Representative of the United Kingdom to NATO, from which he retired in March 2010. While in Brussels, he played an important role in establishing the Building Integrity initiative within NATO, working with other key Allies, the International Staff and Transparency International.

During his diplomatic career, he specialized in security policy and multilateral negotiation. He served as Deputy Crisis Manager for the 1990-91 Gulf War, for which he was appointed an OBE in 1991. He has contributed to a study on the UN Security Council published by the International Peace Academy in New York in 2004, and was a Fellow at the Harvard Center for International Affairs in 1993-94.

He now works with NATO as a Subject Matter Expert on Building Integrity, and advises Transparency International on anti-corruption issues in Defence and Security. He also undertakes a number of other consultancy assignments, and is an Accredited Civil & Commercial Mediator. He is a member of the Parole Board for England & Wales, and sits on the Special Immigration Appeals Commission.

Diplomatic posts
Preceded by Ivor Roberts	British Ambassador to Ireland; 2003–2006	Succeeded by David Reddaway
