= Oliver Forster =

British diplomat (1925–1999)

- Born: 9 March 1925
- Died: 26 August 1999 (aged 74)
- Occupation: Diplomat
- Known for: British High Commissioner to Pakistan

Sir Oliver Grantham Forster KCMG LVO (2 September 1925 – 3 November 1999) was a British diplomat.

== Personal life ==
He was educated at Hurstpierpoint College and King's College, Cambridge.

== Career ==
He joined the Foreign and Commonwealth Office in 1951 and later served as UK Ambassador to Pakistan from 1979 to 1984. He was made a Lieutenant of the Royal Victorian Order in 1961, Companion of the Order of St Michael and St George in 1976 and Knight Commander of that same order in 1983.

== Honours ==
- Knight Commander of the Order of St Michael and St George (KCMG) - 1983

Diplomatic posts
Preceded by John Bushell	UK Ambassador to Pakistan; 1979–1984	Succeeded by Richard Fyjis-Walker
