= Gilbert Laithwaite =

British diplomat

Sir John Gilbert Laithwaite GCMG KCB KCIE CSI (5 July 1894 – 21 December 1986) was a British civil servant and diplomat, born and raised in Ireland. He reached the top of his profession, becoming Permanent Secretary of the Commonwealth Relations Office in 1955.

== Early life ==
Gilbert Laithwaite was the eldest of two sons and two daughters, born in Dublin. His father was John Laithwaite of the Post Office survey. His mother was Mary Kearney whose family hailed from Castlerea, County Roscommon. Laithwaite was a first cousin of the Irish Republican leader Ernie O'Malley.

Laithwaite went to Clongowes Wood College, where he won a scholarship to Trinity College, Oxford, going on to achieve a second-class degree. He received an honorary fellowship from that college in 1955.

Laithwaite was a homosexual.

== War service ==
In the First World War, Laithwaite served in the British army in France as a second lieutenant with the 10th Lancashire Fusiliers. He was wounded in 1918. In 1971 he published an account of part of his war experience entitled 21 March 1918: Memories of an Infantry Officer.

== Career ==
Following the war, Laithwaite joined the India Office. In 1931 he was attached to Prime Minister Ramsay MacDonald for the second Indian round-table conference in London.

Work in India followed, on the Lothian Committee on Indian Franchise, which extended the Indian franchise to 35 million voters. From 1936 to 1943 he was principal private secretary to the Viceroy of India, Lord Linlithgow.

In 1943 he returned to Britain as assistant under-secretary of state for India. In 1947 he took part in London talks on Burmese independence, also attended by Stafford Cripps and Aung San. In 1949, he became United Kingdom representative, and from 1 July 1950 Ambassador, to Ireland (where, despite being half Irish, he was generally seen as less successful than his predecessor Lord Rugby in establishing friendly relations with members of the Irish Cabinet). In 1951 he became high commissioner to Pakistan. In this position he became concerned with the implications of US military aid to Pakistan under Iskander Mirza. He reached the apex of his career as Permanent Secretary at the Commonwealth Relations Office from 1955 to 1959, visiting Australia and New Zealand. From 1963 to 1966 he was vice-chairman of the Commonwealth Institute.

== Honours ==
Laithwaite was appointed CIE in the 1935 New Year Honours, CSI in the 1938 New Year Honours and knighted KCIE in 1941. He was further appointed KCMG in the 1948 New Year Honours, GCMG in the 1953 Coronation Honours and KCB in the 1956 New Year Honours. In 1960 he was appointed a Knight of Malta. He was president of the Hakluyt Society (1964–1969), vice-president of the Royal Central Asian Society (1967) and president of the Royal Geographical Society (1966–1969).

Diplomatic posts
Preceded by John Maffey, 1st Baron Rugby	UK Representative to Ireland; 1949–1950	Succeeded by himself as British Ambassador to Ireland
Preceded by himself as British Representative to Ireland	UK Ambassador to Ireland; 1950–1951	Succeeded by Walter Hankinson
Preceded by Sir Laurence Grafftey-Smith	UK High Commissioner to the Dominion of Pakistan; 1951–1954	Succeeded by Sir Alexander Symon
Government offices
Preceded by Sir Percivale Liesching	Permanent Secretary of the Commonwealth Relations Office; 1955–1959	Succeeded by Sir Alexander Clutterbuck
