= Patrick Nixon =

British diplomat

Patrick Michael Nixon CMG OBE (1 August 1944) is a former British diplomat.

He was educated at Downside School and Magdalene College, Cambridge.

He was Ambassador and Consul-General in Doha, Qatar, from 1987 to 1990, British High Commissioner to Zambia from 1994 to 1997, and British Ambassador to the United Arab Emirates from 1998 to 2003.

He was made an Officer of the Order of the British Empire (OBE) in the 1984 New Year Honours, and a Companion of the Order of St Michael and St George (CMG) in the 1989 Birthday Honours.
