= Peter Torry =

British diplomat

Sir Peter Torry GCVO KCMG

British Ambassador to Germany
- In office 2003–2007
- Monarch: Elizabeth II
- President: Johannes Rau; Horst Köhler
- Prime Minister: Tony Blair
- Chancellor: Gerhard Schröder; Angela Merkel
- Preceded by: Sir Paul Lever
- Succeeded by: Sir Michael Arthur

British Ambassador to Spain
- In office 1998–2003
- Prime Minister: Tony Blair
- Preceded by: David Brighty
- Succeeded by: Sir Stephen Wright

Personal details
- Born: 2 August 1948 (age 77)
- Children: 3
- Education: Dover College
- Alma mater: New College, Oxford

Sir Peter James Torry GCVO KCMG (born 2 August 1948) is a former British diplomat who was the UK Ambassador to Germany from 2003 until 30 September 2007.

He is now a senior adviser to Cairn Capital and to STAR Capital Partners. He is on the Supervisory Board of Blohm and Voss AG. He is a member of the advisory board of Betfair plc and of the Kiel Global Economic Symposium and a policy fellow of the Institute on the Future of Employment in Bonn. He was a member of the advisory panel of Lloyds Pharmacy until April 2010 and a senior adviser to DAM Capital until December 2009, to Centrica plc until 2012 and to Celesio AG.

He was educated at Dover College and at New College, Oxford, to which he won an Open Scholarship. At Oxford he won a blue for Rugby in 1968 and 1969, when the University beat the touring Springboks. He was subsequently selected for the President's of the Rugby Union XV against Wales

He was previously Ambassador to Spain from 1998 to 2003 and worked for the Foreign and Commonwealth Office in Washington DC, Bonn, Jakarta and Cuba.

== Family ==
He is married and has three daughters, Emma, Harriet and Katherine.

Diplomatic posts
Preceded by David Brighty	British Ambassador to Spain; 1998–2003	Succeeded by Stephen Wright
Preceded by Sir Paul Lever	British Ambassador to Germany; 2003–2007	Succeeded by Sir Michael Arthur
