= List of high commissioners of the United Kingdom to Pakistan =

Countries belonging to the Commonwealth of Nations typically exchange high commissioners rather than ambassadors. Though there are a few technical differences, they are in practice the same office. The following persons have served as British high commissioner to the Islamic Republic of Pakistan.

The state of Pakistan was established on 14 August 1947 in the eastern and northwestern regions of British India. In 1972, Pakistan temporarily withdrew from the Commonwealth, and until it rejoined in 1989, the mission in Islamabad became an Embassy, headed by an Ambassador. The high commissioner is based at the British High Commission in Islamabad.

== List of heads of mission ==
=== High commissioners to Pakistan ===
- 1947–1951: Sir Laurence Grafftey-Smith
- 1951–1954: Sir Gilbert Laithwaite
- 1954–1961: Sir Alexander Symon
- 1961–1965: Sir Morrice James
- 1966–1971: Sir Cyril Pickard

=== Ambassadors to Pakistan ===
- 1972–1976: Sir Laurence Pumphrey
- 1976–1979: John Bushell
- 1979–1984: Sir Oliver Forster
- 1984–1987: Richard Fyjis-Walker
- 1987–1989: Nicholas Barrington

=== High commissioners to Pakistan ===
- 1989–1994: Sir Nicholas Barrington
- 1994–1997: Sir Christopher MacRae
- 1997–2000: Sir David Dain
- 2000–2003: Sir Hilary Synnott
- 2003–2006: Sir Mark Lyall Grant
- 2006–2010: Robert Brinkley
- 2010–2013: Sir Adam Thomson
- 2014–2016: Philip Barton
- 2016-2019: Thomas Drew
- 2019–2022: Christian Turner
- 2022–2023: Andrew Dalgleish
- 2023–present: Jane Marriott
