= Morrice James, Baron Saint Brides =

British diplomat (1916–1989)

The Right Honourable The Lord Saint Brides GCMG CVO MBE PC

British High Commissioner to Australia
- In office 1971–1976
- Monarch: Elizabeth II
- Prime Minister: Edward Heath; Harold Wilson
- Preceded by: Sir Charles Johnston
- Succeeded by: Sir Donald Tebbit

British High Commissioner to India
- In office 1968–1971
- Monarch: Elizabeth II
- Prime Minister: Harold Wilson; Edward Heath
- Preceded by: John Freeman
- Succeeded by: Sir Terence Garvey

British High Commissioner to Pakistan
- In office 1961–1965
- Monarch: Elizabeth II
- Prime Minister: Harold Macmillan; Alec Douglas-Home; Harold Wilson
- Preceded by: Sir Alexander Symon
- Succeeded by: Sir Cyril Pickard

Personal details
- Born: 30 April 1916
- Died: 26 November 1989 (aged 73)
- Education: Balliol College, Oxford
- Occupation: Diplomat

Military service
- Allegiance: United Kingdom
- Branch/service: Royal Marines
- Rank: Lieutenant Colonel
- Battles/wars: Second World War
- Awards: Member of the Order of the British Empire

John Morrice Cairns James, Baron Saint Brides, GCMG, CVO, MBE, PC (30 April 1916 – 26 November 1989), normally known as Morrice James, was a senior British diplomat. He served as British High Commissioner to Pakistan, India and Australia, and was known as a specialist in the affairs of the Indian subcontinent.

== Early life and Second World War ==
James was born on 30 April 1916 and was educated at Bradfield College and Balliol College, Oxford. He joined the Dominions Office in London in 1939, and was Private Secretary to the Permanent Under-Secretary of State from April to August 1940. In August 1940 he joined the Royal Navy as an Ordinary Seaman, was commissioned in the Royal Marines in February of the following year, and ended the war as a lieutenant colonel.

== Career ==
James returned to the Dominions Office (which merged with the India Office in 1947 to form the Commonwealth Relations Office) in 1945, and served in South Africa, London, and Pakistan, where he headed the Deputy High Commissions in both Lahore and Karachi during the 1950s. He then served as Deputy High Commissioner in New Delhi before returning to Pakistan as High Commissioner from 1962 to 1965. From 1968 to 1971 he served once more in New Delhi, as High Commissioner, and was appointed High Commissioner to Australia in 1971. He retired from the Diplomatic Service in 1976.

== Honours ==
James was appointed a Member of the Order of the British Empire (MBE) in 1944, a Companion of the Order of St Michael and St George (CMG) in 1957, a Commander of the Royal Victorian Order (CVO) in 1961, he was promoted to Knight Commander of the Order of St Michael and St George (KCMG) in 1962, and to Knight Grand Cross (GCMG) in 1975. He was appointed King of Arms of the Order of St Michael and St George in 1975. He was appointed to the Privy Council in 1966, and was created a life peer as Baron Saint Brides, of Hasguard in the County of Dyfed on 8 February 1977.

== Arms ==
Coat of arms of Morrice James, Baron Saint Brides
Crest Issuant from the Crown of a King of Arms an Owl proper Escutcheon Azure the Cross section of a Nautilus Shell proper on a Chief Or a Karachi Lateen-Rigged Dhow between two Dolphins Azure; Supporters Dexter: a Sea Horse (hippocampus) Azure gorged with a Naval Coronet Or supporting the Staff of the King of Arms of the Order of St Michael and St George proper; Sinister: a Lion crowned with an Ancient Crown Or gorged with a Wreath Azure Or Vert and Gules supporting a like Staff Motto WHAT WE GAVE WE HAVE Orders Order of St Michael and St George circlet (Appointed GCMG 1975)

Diplomatic posts
Preceded by Sir Alexander Symon	British High Commissioner to Pakistan; 1961–1965	Succeeded by Sir Cyril Pickard
Government offices
Preceded by Sir Saville Garner	Permanent Secretary of the Commonwealth Office; 1966	Succeeded by Sir Paul Gore-Booth as Permanent Secretary, Foreign Office
Diplomatic posts
Preceded by John Freeman	British High Commissioner to India; 1968–1971	Succeeded by Sir Terence Garvey
Preceded by Sir Charles Johnston	British High Commissioner to Australia; 1971–1976	Succeeded by Sir Donald Tebbit
Heraldic offices
Preceded by The Lord Inchyra	King of Arms of the Order of St Michael and St George; 1975–1987	Succeeded by Sir Oliver Wright
