= Saville Garner =

British diplomat (1908–1983)

The Right Honourable The Lord Garner GCMG
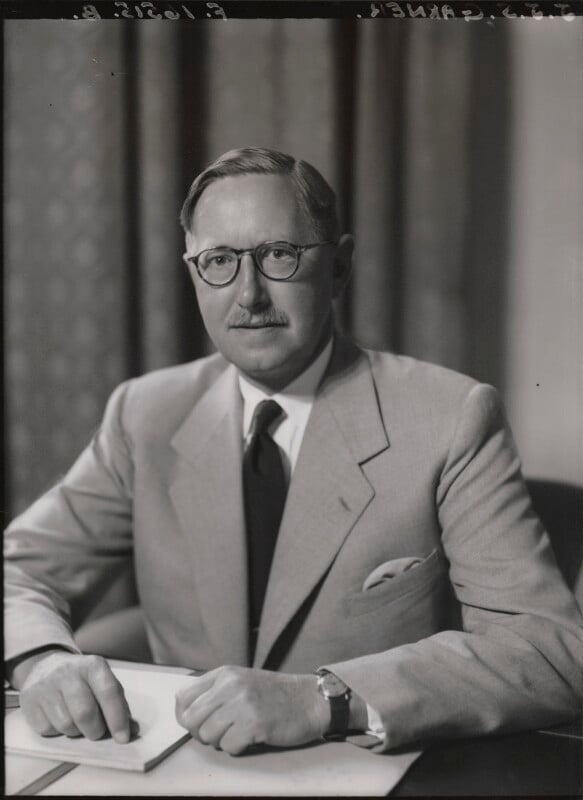
- Garner in 1953

Permanent Under-Secretary of State for Commonwealth Relations
- In office 1962–1965

High Commissioner of the United Kingdom to Canada
- In office 1956–1961
- Preceded by: Sir Archibald Nye
- Succeeded by: The Viscount Amory

Personal details
- Born: Joseph John Saville Garner; 14 February 1908 Muswell Hill, Middlesex
- Died: 10 December 1983 (aged 75)
- Children: 3
- Education: Jesus College, Cambridge

Joseph John Saville Garner, Baron Garner GCMG (14 February 1908 – 10 December 1983) was a British diplomat who served as the British High Commissioner to Canada from 1956 to 1961.

Garner was educated at Highgate School (and was later the school's Chairman of Governors from 1976–83). He won a scholarship to Jesus College, Cambridge, where he read Modern and Mediaeval Languages. He joined the Civil Service in 1930, working in the Dominions Office. J. H. Thomas refused to call him by his customary first name ("What sort of fancy name is that? Ain't you got a plainer name?") and called Garner "Joe" instead, a name which stuck. In June 1954 he was working as Deputy Under-Secretary of State, Commonwealth Relations Office when he was made a Knight Commander of the Order of St Michael and St George.

In 1956, he was appointed High Commissioner to Canada and served in that position until 1961. He was made a Knight Grand Cross of the Order of St Michael and St George on 1 January 1965. At the time he was serving as the Permanent Under-Secretary of State at the Commonwealth Relations Office. He subsequently served as Head of Her Majesty's Diplomatic Service.

Garner was made a life peer on 21 February 1969, being created Baron Garner, of Chiddingley in the County of Sussex, and assuming his seat in the House of Lords.

Government offices
| Preceded by Sir Alexander Clutterbuck | Permanent Secretary of the Commonwealth Relations Office; 1962–1966 | Succeeded by himself as Permanent Secretary, Commonwealth Office |
| Preceded by himself as Permanent Secretary, Commonwealth Relations Office | Permanent Secretary of the Commonwealth Office; 1966–1968 | Succeeded by Sir Morrice James |
| Preceded by Sir Hilton Poynton as Permanent Secretary, Colonial Office | Permanent Secretary of the Commonwealth Office; 1966–1968 | Succeeded by Sir Morrice James |
