= Alexander Clutterbuck =

British diplomat

Sir Alexander Clutterbuck GCMG MC

Personal details
- Born: Peter Alexander Clutterbuck; 27 March 1897 Gorakhpur, India
- Died: 29 December 1975 (aged 78)
- Occupation: British diplomat, high commissioner to Canada and India and ambassador to Ireland
- Known for: Appointed GCMG

Sir Peter Alexander Clutterbuck GCMG MC (27 March 1897 – 29 December 1975) was a British diplomat who was high commissioner to Canada and India and ambassador to Ireland.

== Life and career ==
Alexander's father, Sir Peter Clutterbuck, was an Inspector General of Forests in India and Burma.

Peter Alexander Clutterbuck was educated at Malvern College and Pembroke College, Cambridge. During World War I, he served in the Coldstream Guards and was awarded the Military Cross and a mention in dispatches. After the war he entered the Civil Service, at first in the Post Office, transferring to the Colonial Office in 1922.

He was secretary to the Donoughmore Commission 1927–28, and a member of the UK delegations to the League of Nations General Assembly in 1929, 1930 and 1931. He was secretary to the Newfoundland Royal Commission in 1933. He was High Commissioner to Canada 1946–52 and to India 1952–55. His term in India was cut short by ill health: he was advised not to continue to serve in a tropical climate and was appointed ambassador to Ireland 1955–59.

Finally, he was Permanent Under-Secretary at the Commonwealth Relations Office 1959–61.

Clutterbuck was appointed CMG in the 1943 New Year Honours, knighted KCMG in the New Year Honours of 1946 and raised to GCMG in the Queen's Birthday Honours of 1952.

Lord Garner, Clutterbuck's successor at the Commonwealth Relations Office, wrote:

Clutterbuck's appointment as High Commissioner to Ottawa in 1946 marked the first occasion when a career officer, assigned to a major Commonwealth post, showed that he could hold his own against any appointments from outside the services. Clutterbuck with his wife created an atmosphere of family feeling amongst the staff which radiated far beyond the confines of Earnscliffe and they ended as one of the most popular couples in a long line of successful British High Commissioners in Canada. ...
Above all Alec Clutterbuck was a Christian and a gentleman. Such phrases may sound out of fashion today, but there will be many past and present members of the service who will remember him with gratitude and affection and will recall the guiding lights of his life – loyalty, devotion to duty, integrity and, supremely, the Christian virtues of humility and charity.

Diplomatic posts
Preceded by Malcolm MacDonald	High Commissioner to Canada; 1946–1952	Succeeded by Sir Archibald Nye
Preceded by Sir Archibald Nye	High Commissioner to India; 1952–1955	Succeeded by Malcolm MacDonald
Preceded by Walter Hankinson	Ambassador to the Republic of Ireland; 1955–1959	Succeeded by Ian Maclennan
Government offices
Preceded by Sir Gilbert Laithwaite	Permanent Secretary of the Commonwealth Relations Office; 1959–1961	Succeeded by Sir Saville Garner
