= Alexander Symon =

British diplomat (1902–1974)

Sir Alexander Colin Burlington Symon KCMG KCVO OBE

British High Commissioner to Pakistan
- In office 1954–1961
- Preceded by: Sir Gilbert Laithwaite
- Succeeded by: Sir Morrice James

Personal details
- Born: 13 May 1902
- Died: 16 July 1974 (aged 72)
- Occupation: Diplomat

Sir Alexander Colin Burlington Symon (13 May 1902 – 16 July 1974) was a British civil servant and diplomat who rose through the India Office and Commonwealth Relations Office to serve as Deputy High Commissioner in India after World War II. From 1954 to 1961, he was the British High Commissioner to Pakistan, where he played a key role in Commonwealth affairs and regional diplomacy.

== Early life and education ==
Symon was born on 13 May 1902, the son of J. M. Symon of Hull. He was educated at Hull Municipal Technical College.

== Career ==
Symon joined the civil service in 1920 and worked at the Customs and Excise Department. Later that year, he was transferred to the India Office. He attained the grade of Executive Officer in 1933 and Assistant Principal the following year. He was secretary to the Indian delegations sent to the Geneva disarmament conference (1932); the London naval conference (1935); and was seconded to the Indian purchasing mission as assistant secretary in Washington DC (1941 to 1946). In 1938, he was selected by Sir Findlater Stewart, Permanent Under-Secretary of State to India, to be his private secretary. During World War II, he was loaned to the Ministry of Information. After the War, he was appointed Deputy High Commissioner for the United Kingdom in India, serving in the post from 1946 to 1949.

From 1949 to 1954, Symon was assistant under-secretary of state and then deputy under-secretary of state at the Commonwealth Relations Office. He was a member of the UK committee responsible for the creation of Colombo Plan which provided assistance to undeveloped countries of the Commonwealth, and was a member of the delegations sent to Karachi, Delhi and Ottawa. He was then sent to Africa in 1954 to report on the financial and economic position of the High Commission territories of Swaziland, Basutoland and Bechuanaland.

Symon then served as British High Commissioner in Pakistan from 1954 to 1961. He was a member of the UK delegation to the SEATO Council meeting in Karachi in 1956, and to the Baghdad Pact Council meetings in 1957 and 1961. On his departure from Pakistan, according to the Times, "Symon praised the regime of President Ayub Khan which he said had put Pakistan on the right path of progress."

== Personal life and death ==
Symon married Doris Comfort in 1930. There were no children.

Symon died on 16 July 1974, aged 72.

== Honours ==
Symon was appointed Officer of the Order of the British Empire (OBE) in the 1944 New Year Honours. He was appointed Companion of the Order of St Michael and St George (CMG) in the 1948 Birthday Honours, and promoted to Knight Commander (KCMG) in the 1955 Birthday Honours. He was appointed Knight Commander of the Royal Victorian Order (KCVO) in 1961.

== See also ==
- Pakistan–United Kingdom relations

Diplomatic posts
Preceded by Sir Gilbert Laithwaite	British High Commissioner to Pakistan; 1954–1961	Succeeded by Sir Morrice James
