= Percivale Liesching =

British civil servant (1895-1973)

Sir Percivale Liesching GCMG KCB KCVO (1 April 1895 – 4 November 1973) was a British civil servant who held two posts as Permanent Under-Secretary and was High Commissioner in South Africa.

== Biography ==
Born in London, Liesching was educated at Bedford School and Brasenose College, Oxford. During World War I he served in the Rifle Brigade.

He held the post of Permanent Under-Secretary, Ministry of Food, from 1946 to 1948, and then Permanent Under-Secretary of State for Commonwealth Relations from 1949 to 1955.

In the latter position he was active in persuading British government ministers to bar Seretse Khama, heir to the throne in the African state of Bechuanaland, not only from becoming king but from ever returning to his country after he had visited Britain for talks about his future. Liesching's main motivation for urging such action was that Khama had married a white English woman, Ruth Williams – an inter-racial marriage to which the leaders of apartheid South Africa, a neighbouring state of Bechuanaland, had objected vehemently.

According to the historian Susan Williams in her book Colour Bar: The Triumph of Seretse Khama and His Nation, Liesching 'as official head of the Commonwealth Relations Office, had been instrumental in Seretse's exile', and his desire to carry out South Africa's wishes on Seretse 'was generated from deeply felt racism'.

In 1955 Liesching left the CRO to take up an appointment as High Commissioner in South Africa, a post he held until 1958. His replacement at the CRO was Sir Gilbert Laithwaite, under whom a more enlightened attitude towards Khama's marriage emerged almost immediately. Within a year both Khama and his wife had been allowed to return to Bechuanaland and eventually Khama led the country to independence as Botswana.

Liesching died in Sidcup, Kent, on 4 November 1973.

== Sources ==
- "Liesching, Sir Percivale". Oxford Dictionary of National Biography (online ed.). Oxford University Press. doi:10.1093/ref:odnb/64154. (Subscription, Wikipedia Library access or UK public library membership required.)
- LIESCHING, Sir Percivale, Who Was Who, A & C Black, 1920–2015 (online edition, Oxford University Press, 2014)
- Williams, Susan. 2006. Colour Bar. Allen Lane. ISBN 0-7139-9811-3

Government offices
Preceded by Sir Archibald Carter	Permanent Secretary of the Commonwealth Relations Office; 1949–1955	Succeeded by Sir Gilbert Laithwaite
