= Countryside Commission =

Former statutory body in England and Wales

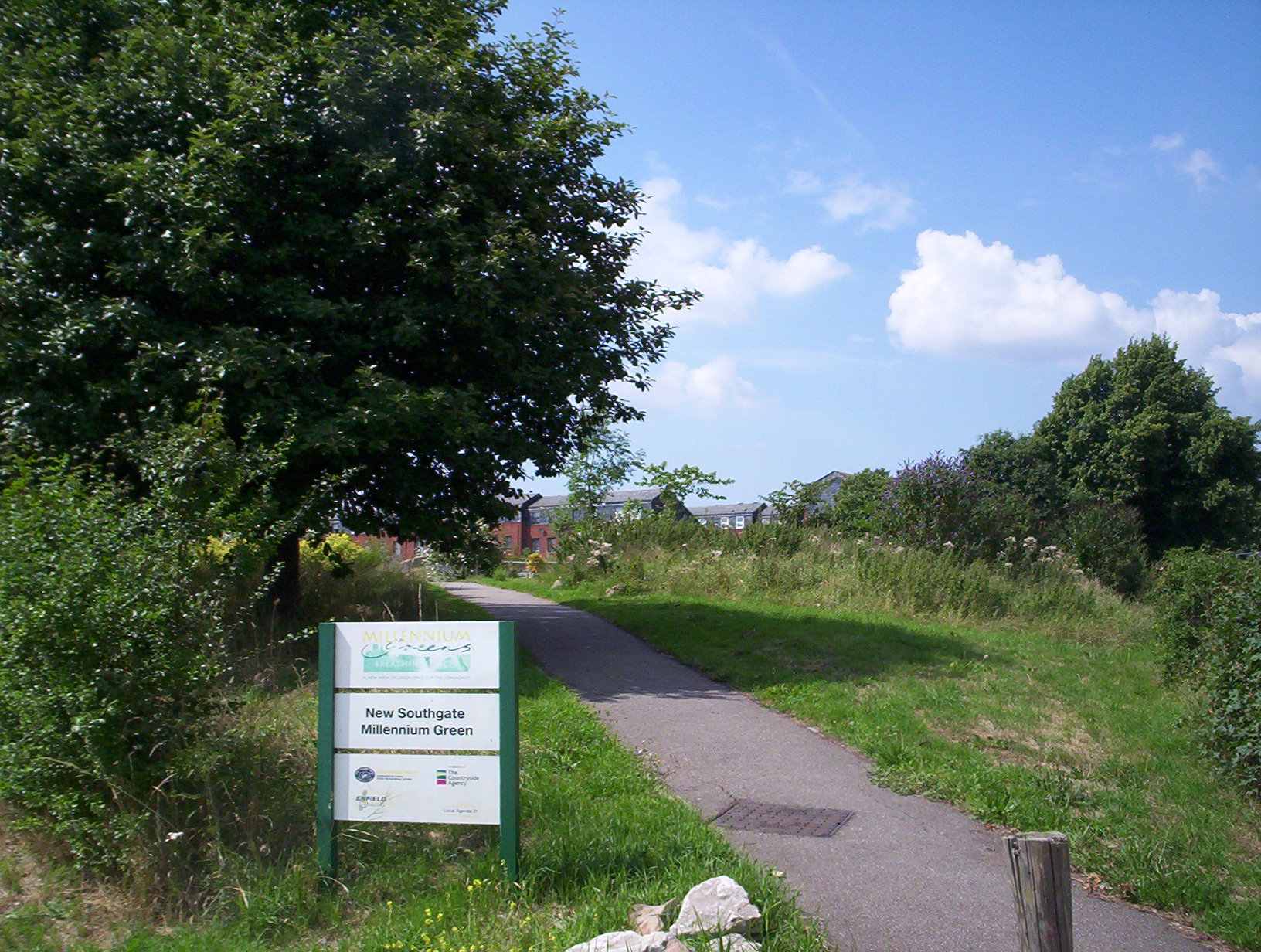
New Southgate Millennium Green- one of 245 Millennium Greens created by the Countryside Commission across the Turn of the Millennium

The Countryside Commission (formally the Countryside Commission for England and Wales, then the Countryside Commission for England) was a statutory body in England and Wales, and later in England only. Its forerunner, the National Parks Commission, was established in 1949 by the National Parks and Access to the Countryside Act 1949 to co-ordinate government activity in relation to National Parks.

This body became the Countryside Commission for England and Wales in 1968, when its duties were expanded to cover the countryside as a whole in England and Wales (a separate Countryside Commission for Scotland covered Scotland).

In 1991 the Welsh part of the organisation was split off and amalgamated with the equivalent part of the Nature Conservancy Council (NCC) to become the Countryside Council for Wales. The rest of the organisation became the Countryside Commission for England – for the moment it remained separate from English Nature, as the English part of the NCC became.

The Countryside Commission ceased to exist in 1999 when it was merged with the Rural Development Commission to form the Countryside Agency. This has in turn evolved into Natural England, partly by eventual merger with English Nature.

== List of chairmen of the Countryside Commission ==
- The Baroness Wootton of Abinger
- Sir John Cripps (1970–1977)
- The Lord Winstanley (1978–1980)
- Sir Derek Barber (1981–1991)
- Sir John Johnson (1991–?)
- Richard Simmonds (1996?–?)
