= Alan Goodison =

British diplomat (1926–2006)

Sir Alan Clowes Goodison, KCMG (20 November 1926 – 30 June 2006) was a British diplomat who served as Ambassador to Ireland from 1983 to 1986.

Diplomatic posts
Preceded by Leonard Figg	British Ambassador to Ireland; 1983-1986	Succeeded by Nicholas Fenn
