= Nowshera Brigade =

- Active: 1939–1945
- Country: India
- Allegiance: British Empire
- Branch: Indian Army
- Type: Infantry
- Size: Brigade

Commanders
- Notable commanders: Brigadier Sir Harold Alexander; Brigadier HH Rich; Brigadier GGC Bull; Brigadier EW Langlands; Brigadier RG Ekin

The Nowshera Brigade was an infantry brigade formation of the Indian Army during World War II. It was formed in September 1939, for service on the North West Frontier. It was normal practice for newly formed battalions to be posted to the North West Frontier for service before being sent to Africa, Burma or Italy.

== Formation ==
- 1st Field Regiment, Royal Artillery September 1939
- 1/6th Gurkha Rifles September 1939 to April 1940
- 10/11th Sikh Regiment September 1939
- 2/11th Sikh Regiment September 1939 to August 1940
- 4/5th Mahratta Light Infantry September 1939 to April 1941
- 11/12th Frontier Force Regiment September 1939
- 2/9th Gurkha Rifles September to November 1939
- 2nd South Staffordshire Regiment December 1939 to September 1940
- 2/6th Gurkha Rifles April to November 1940
- Mahindra Dal Regiment, Nepal September 1940 to November 1941
- Shere Regiment, Nepal September 1940 to December 1941
- 3/9th Jat Regiment October 1940 to May 1941
- Purnao Gorakh Regiment, Nepal October 1940 to December 1942
- Bairab Nath Regiment, Nepal October 1940 to July 1941
- 1/4th Bombay Grenadiers November 1940 to October 1941
- 2/7th Rajput Regiment November 1940 to March 1941
- Jodhpur Sadar Infantry November 1940 to April 1941
- Kalibahadur Regiment, Nepal November to December 1940
- 1st Patiala Infantry March to April 1941
- 2/4th Bombay Grenadiers April to October 1941
- 1st Lincolnshire Regiment June 1941 to February 1942
- 2/5th Gurkha Rifles September to October 1941
- 7/14th Punjab Regiment November 1941 to February 1942
- 14/5th Mahratta Light Infantry February to October 1942
- 8/15th Punjab Regiment April to May 1942
- 1st Mahar Regiment August 1942 to March 1944
- 16/7th Rajput Regiment August to September 1942
- 16/13th Frontier Force Rifles October 1942 to June 1943
- 2nd Patiala Infantry December 1942 to March 1944
- 8/10th Baluch Regiment June 1943 to September 1944
- 8/6th Rajputana Rifles July 1943 to February 1945
- 3rd Mahar Regiment November 1943 to August 1945
- 18th King Edward VII's Own Cavalry July to August 1944
- 8/9th Jat Regiment August 1944 to June 1945
- 2/3rd Madras Regiment September 1944 to March 1945
- 2/5th Gurkha Rifles September 1944 to August 1945
- 15/9th Jat Regiment November 1944 to August 1945
- 1/7th Rajput Regiment March to June 1945
- 15/6th Rajputana Rifles March to August 1945
- 3/11th Sikh Regiment June to August 1945
- 2nd Field Company, Indian Engineers September 1939
- Shirmoor Field Company, Indian State Forces November 1940 to December 1941
- 96th Field Company, Indian Engineers January to September 1942
- 426th Field Company, Indian Engineers January to June 1942
- 75th Field Company Indian Engineers January to December 1943
- 336th Field Company, Indian Engineers January 1944 to March 1945
- 79th Field Company, Indian Engineers March to August 1945

== See also ==
- List of Indian Army Brigades in World War II
