= Cecil Syers =

British diplomat (1903–1981)

Sir Cecil George Lewis Syers, KCMG, CVO, JP (29 March 1903 – 4 December 1981) was a British civil servant and diplomat. He was private secretary to the Prime Minister from 1937 to 1940 and British High Commissioner to Ceylon from 1951 to 1957.

He was secretary of the University Grants Committee from 1958 to 1963.
