= Leonard Figg =

British diplomat

Sir Leonard Clifford William Figg KCMG (17 August 1923 – 11 August 2014) was a British diplomat.

Figg was the son of Sir Clifford Figg, a tea and rubber planter, and was educated at Charterhouse School and Trinity College, Oxford. He served with the Royal Air Force between 1942 and 1946.

He joined the Foreign Office in 1947 and served in Addis Ababa between 1949 and 1952, Head of Chancery and Consul in Amman between 1958 and 1961, Deputy Consul-General in Chicago between 1967 and 1969, and Consul-General in Milan between 1973 and 1977. He was Assistant Under-Secretary of State at the Foreign Office from 1977 to 1980, when he was appointed Ambassador to Ireland, serving until 1983.

Figg was appointed CMG in 1974 and KCMG in the 1981 Birthday Honours.

Diplomatic posts
| Preceded by Robin Haydon | British Ambassador to Ireland; 1980-1983 | Succeeded by Alan Goodison |
