= James Bevan (diplomat) =

British diplomat

Sir James Bevan KCMG
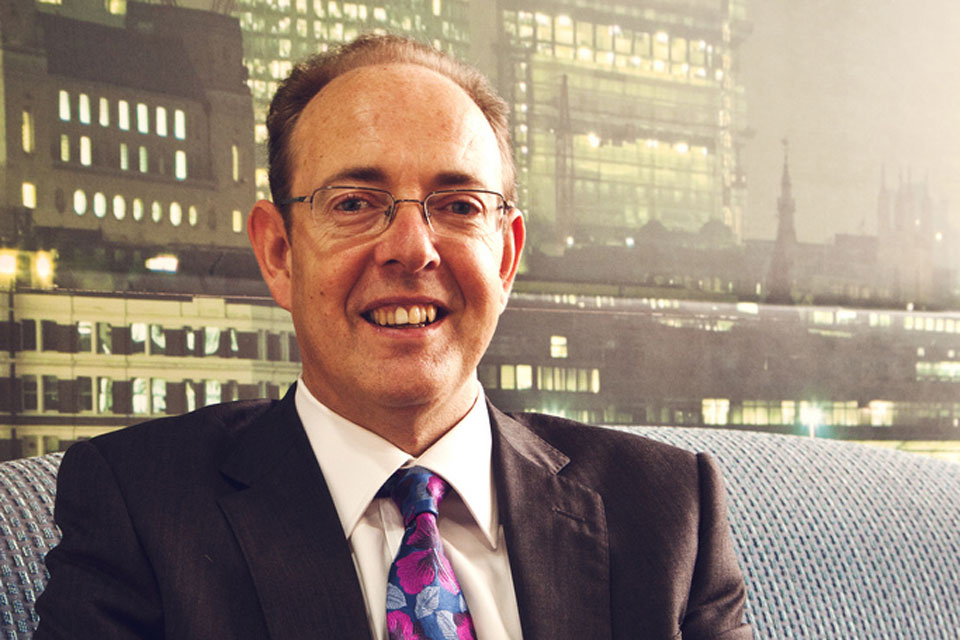

Chief Executive of the Environment Agency
- In office 2015–2023
- Preceded by: Paul Leinster
- Succeeded by: Philip Duffy

High Commissioner of the United Kingdom to India
- In office 2011–2015
- Monarch: Elizabeth II
- Preceded by: Richard Stagg
- Succeeded by: Dominic Asquith

Personal details
- Born: 13 July 1959 (age 67)
- Education: Royal Grammar School, High Wycombe
- Alma mater: Sussex University
- Occupation: Diplomat

Sir James David Bevan KCMG (born 13 July 1959) is the former Chief Executive of the Environment Agency and a former British diplomat.

== Early life ==
Bevan was born on 13 July 1959. He was educated at the Royal Grammar School, High Wycombe and Sussex University.

== Career ==
He joined the British Diplomatic Service in 1982 and served in Kinshasa, Brussels, Paris, and Washington, D.C., as well as various posts in the Foreign and Commonwealth Office. He was a visiting fellow at the Weatherhead Center for International Affairs at Harvard (2006–07) and the Chief Operating Officer of the FCO (2007–11). He was the UK's High Commissioner to India from 2011 to 2015.

Bevan became Chief Executive of the Environment Agency in 2015. The Environment Agency's stated aims include confronting climate change, promoting sustainable growth, enhancing the nation's resilience to flooding and drought, and protecting the environment. He has been outspoken on the need to tackle the climate emergency and its consequences, and on the benefits for business and wider society of doing so successfully.

Under Bevan's leadership the Environment Agency has been criticized for "failing to police the behaviour of water companies, stifling frontline fieldwork, reducing monitoring, failing to protect rivers, gagging staff, and when faced with growing public outcry about the state of English rivers, trying to weaken the tough regulations which repeatedly show how waterways are being choked by a cocktail of sewage and agricultural pollution".

In March 2026 Environment Secretary Emma Reynolds suggested that stripping Bevan of his knighthood is "seriously considered" due to his failure to protect rivers and waterways. The Government minister was quoted "It's horrific what's been happening, we've had record levels of pollution in our waterways," LBC reported that 5,000 signatures have been collected advocating Bevan is stripped of his title.

Bevan was portrayed by Alex Jennings in the 2026 TV drama Dirty Business, about illegal sewage releases by water companies. Dirty Business focusses on the campaigning actions of Ashley Smith and Peter Hammond who formed Windrush Against Sewage Pollution (WASP) to highlight the failing oversight of the Environment Agency allowing water companies and farmers to break the law without penalty. Smith and Hammond are portrayed as heroic, intelligent English heroes in a struggle to save their local river and then the rivers of the nation "Ash's infallible nose for dishonesty, married with the algorithm Peter devises to find patterns in confusing data builds a picture of water infrastructure destroyed by three decades of underinvestment, leading to environmental calamity."

In a speech in 2020, Bevan called for reforms to inherited EU law, including reform of the Water Framework Directive, arguing that its standards were overly strict and did not reflect the actual quality of waterways. Environmental advocates were angered by the proposed reforms, arguing they represented an unacceptable relaxing of standards needed to ensure clean waterways in the country.

He said in 2021 during the annual conference of the Association of British Insurers that extreme flooding in UK indicates urgent need for change if humanity is to survive. He was succeeded by Phillip Duffy in 2023.

== Personal life ==
Bevan is married with three daughters.

== Honours ==
Bevan was appointed CMG in 2006 and knighted KCMG in 2012.
