= List of ambassadors of the United Kingdom to Ireland =

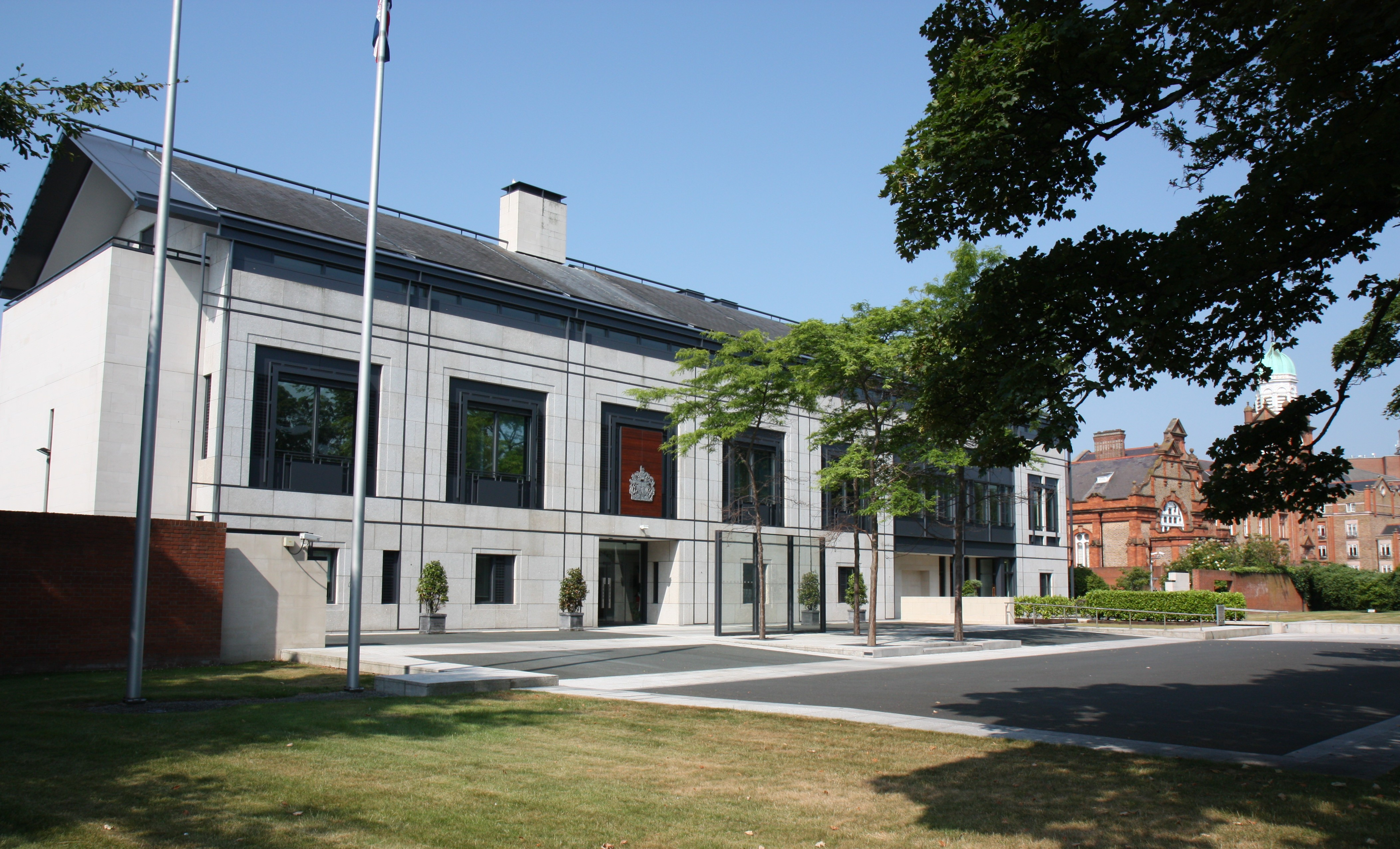
British Embassy, Dublin

The ambassador of the United Kingdom to Ireland is the United Kingdom's foremost diplomatic representative in Ireland and head of the UK's diplomatic mission in Ireland.

== Official title ==
For several decades the British and Irish governments disputed the respective names of their States: the "United Kingdom of Great Britain and Northern Ireland" and "Ireland" respectively. The UK's official policy was to refer to Ireland as the "Republic of Ireland". Up to and including the year 1999, the Diplomatic List issued by the British Foreign and Commonwealth Office referred to the "Republic of Ireland", while the Irish Diplomatic List referred to "Great Britain". Similarly, Ireland's policy was to use the term "British" when referring to the UK's diplomatic representative, as "UK" implied acceptance of British sovereignty over Northern Ireland. However, this dispute over names was ended following the Good Friday Agreement. Consequently, since 2000 the British Diplomatic List has referred to "Ireland", and the credentials presented by the British ambassador, Stewart Eldon, in 2003, were addressed to the President of Ireland, while since 2001, the Irish Diplomatic List referred to the "United Kingdom". The British Ambassador to Ireland has since been styled officially as "His Majesty's Ambassador to Ireland".

== List of heads of mission ==
The Governor-General of the Irish Free State had been the effective representative of the UK in the Irish Free State, negating the need for a separate envoy. However, following a 1926 Imperial Conference, each dominion's Governor-General became advised by the Government of that dominion rather than by Whitehall and the need arose for an envoy.

The first British diplomatic representatives to the new Irish Free State did not have the title of "Ambassador", instead having the title of "Representative", or "Minister". This was a compromise and arose because the nascent Irish state had proposed that the UK's representative should be styled as "Ambassador" rather than "High Commissioner", as was the norm in Commonwealth countries, despite Ireland itself having appointed a High Commissioner to London in 1923, similarly exchanging High Commissioners with Canada, a fellow dominion, in 1938. However the UK refused to use the title of "Ambassador" as it indicated a non-existent foreign status, as UK cabinet's minutes of September 1939 recorded at the time:

The Secretary of State for Dominion Affairs reported that Mr de Valera had expressed himself as willing to receive a representative of the United Kingdom Government in Dublin. He proposed that this representative should have the title of Ambassador, but it had been intimated that this was impossible from our point of view and the title "Representative" had been agreed. The Secretary of State thought that until [the United Kingdom] representative had been appointed, it would be undesirable that the Defence Departments should raise with the Éire Government, the grant of any major defence facilities (e.g. the use of Berehaven)

Similarly, the British mission in Dublin was styled not as the High Commission but as the "British Representative's Office". In 1948, the Oireachtas passed the Republic of Ireland Act, under which Ireland withdrew from the Commonwealth the following year, and the name of the office was changed to "Ambassador", although holders of the post continued to be recruited from the Commonwealth Relations Office, later the Commonwealth Office, until the appointment of Sir John Peck in 1970.

=== Representatives ===
- 1939–1949: Sir John Maffey (styled as Lord Rugby from 1947)
- 1949–1950: Sir Gilbert Laithwaite

=== Ambassadors to Ireland ===
- 1950–1951: Sir Gilbert Laithwaite
- 1951–1955: Walter Hankinson
- 1955–1959: Sir Alexander Clutterbuck
- 1959–1964: Sir Ian Maclennan
- 1964–1967: Sir Geofroy Tory
- 1967–1970: Sir Andrew Gilchrist
- 1970–1973: John Peck
- 1973–1976: Sir Arthur Galsworthy
- July 1976: Christopher Ewart-Biggs
- 1976–1980: Walter Robert Haydon
- 1980–1983: Leonard Figg
- 1983–1986: Alan Goodison
- 1986–1991: Sir Nicholas Fenn
- 1991–1995: Sir David Blatherwick
- 1995–1999: Dame Veronica Sutherland
- 1999–2003: Sir Ivor Roberts
- 2003–2006: Sir Stewart Eldon
- 2006–2009: Sir David Reddaway
- 2009–2011: Sir Julian King
- 2012–2016: Sir Dominick Chilcott
- 2016–2020: Robin Barnett
- 2020–2025: Paul Johnston
- 2025–present: Kara Owen

== See also ==
- List of ambassadors of Ireland to the United Kingdom
