= Leonard Allinson =

British civil servant and diplomat (1926–2022)

Sir Walter Leonard Allinson KCVO CMG (1 May 1926 – 28 December 2022) was a British civil servant and diplomat.

Allinson was born on 1 May 1926, the only son of Walter Allinson and Alice Frances Cassidy of Tottenham, and educated at Friern Barnet Grammar School and Merton College, Oxford, graduating in 1944 with a first-class degree in history. In 1951 he married Margaret Patricia "Peggy" Watts. They had three daughters.

He joined the civil service, working in the Ministry of Fuel and Power, followed by the Ministry of Education (1948–58), where he was Principal. He moved to the Commonwealth Relations Office, which merged with the Foreign Office in 1968. He was First Secretary in Lahore and Karachi, Pakistan (1960–62), then First Secretary in Madras and New Delhi, India (1963–66). He was Deputy High Commissioner, Nairobi, Kenya (1970–73); Deputy High Commissioner and Minister, New Delhi (1975–77); High Commissioner, Lusaka (Zambia) (1978–80); and High Commissioner in Kenya and Ambassador to UN Environment Programme (1982–86).

In November 1979 the British High Commission in Lusaka was stormed by a mob of students, and Allinson returned home.

In recognition of his contributions to Her Majesty the Queen's Diplomatic Service, Allinson was awarded a knighthood—a KCVO—in 1979, having previously been awarded an MVO in 1961 and had a CMG conferred upon him in 1976.

Allinson retired to Wendron, Cornwall, where he became treasurer for a regional branch of the Red Cross, treasurer of the local parish church, and a governor of Wendron School. He died on 28 December 2022, at the age of 96.

== Arms ==
Allinson was granted arms by Letters Patent of Garter and Clarenceux Kings of Arms, from the College of Arms, dated 8 June 2018 with the following blazoning: "Arms: Azure three Chevronels interlaced Argent on a Chief wavy Or three Lime Trees eradicated proper. Crest: Upon a Helm with a Wreath Or and Azure A demi Asian Black Bear proper playing a Set of Bagpipes Or the cords Sable the bag in Gordon tartan also proper. Mantled Azure doubled Or."
