= Rob Young (diplomat) =

British diplomat

Sir John Robertson "Rob" Young GCMG (born 21 February 1945) is a retired British diplomat. He was the British High Commissioner to India from 1999 to 2003.

== Career ==
Young was educated at King Edward VI School, Norwich, and Leicester University. He entered the Foreign Office in 1967 and his career focused on the Middle East. He retired in 2003.
