= Laurence Pumphrey =

British diplomat

Sir John Laurence Pumphrey, KCMG (22 July 1916 – 23 December 2009) was a British diplomat.

== Biography ==
Known as Laurie, Pumphrey was educated at Winchester College and New College, Oxford, where he read Classics, taking a First in Honour Moderations. During the Second World War, he was commissioned into the Northumberland Hussars. Captured in Crete, he was imprisoned in Oflag VII-B. After a failed escape attempt he was sent to Colditz Castle. For his wartime service he was awarded the Greek War Cross, 3rd Class.

Joining HM Diplomatic Service in 1945, he was Assistant Private Secretary to Sir Orme Sargent, then was seconded to 10 Downing Street. In 1957, he reported a conversation about a possible leak of a change in the bank rate; a Bank Rate Tribunal was convened, but found that no improprieties had taken place.

He was appointed Counsellor to the Office of the Commissioner-General for the United Kingdom in South East Asia in Singapore in 1960, Counsellor at the British Embassy in Belgrade in 1963, and Deputy High Commissioner to Kenya in 1965. In 1967, Pumphrey was appointed British High Commissioner in Zambia. In 1971 he became British High Commissioner to Pakistan (Ambassador from 1972, when Pakistan left the Commonwealth). He retired in 1976. In retirement he lived in his native Northumberland.

In 1945 he married Jean Riddell, daughter of Sir Walter Riddell, 12th Baronet; they had five children.

Pumphrey was appointed CMG in 1963 and promoted to KCMG in 1973.
