= William Becke =

British Army officer (1916–2009)

William Hugh Adamson Becke
- Born: 24 September 1916
- Died: 3 April 2009 (aged 92)
- Military career
- Allegiance: United Kingdom
- Branch: British Army
- Service years: 1937−1966
- Rank: Lieutenant Colonel
- Nickname: "Bill"
- Service number: 71177
- Unit: Sherwood Foresters
- Conflicts: World War II; Indonesia–Malaysia confrontation

Lieutenant Colonel William Hugh Adamson Becke CMG DSO (24 September 1916 – 3 April 2009) was a British Army officer, best remembered for his role during the Indonesia–Malaysia confrontation.

== Early life and training ==
Becke was born on 24 September 1916 in Worcestershire, the son of Brigadier John Becke, one of the first officers of the Royal Flying Corps, and was educated initially in Scotland then at Charterhouse School and the Royal Military College, Sandhurst.

== Career ==
Becke was commissioned into the 1st Battalion of the Sherwood Foresters in January 1937, the regiment he served with until 1942, he served in Palestine until the outbreak of the Second World War in September 1939. Following this he became signals officer in Cyprus and Egypt and served at Tobruk until shortly before it fell. He commanded a company of the 11th Battalion of the Sherwood Foresters in Iraq, Syria and Algeria, then landed in the bitter fighting for the Anzio beachhead.

Becke then served with the 14th Battalion throughout North Africa and Italy, where he was severely wounded. It was then that he was awarded his DSO at San Savino, for his gallantry in a night attack on German tanks after the Anzio landing in Italy in January 1944 with his battalion. He was wounded in the leg and arm. During the Second World War, Becke also served in the Channel Isles, Palestine, Cyprus, Egypt and Syria.

After the war, Becke returned to the 1st Battalion where he commanded B Company. He also served in the War Office 1945–1949.

In 1949, Becke was appointed assistant adjutant-general to the British Military Mission in Athens, where he served until 1952. He then returned to The War Office 1953–1955. In 1956 he returned to active service as second in command to the 1st Battalion in British Army of the Rhine.

From 1957 to 1959, he was assistant military advisor to the British high commission in Karachi. In 1960 he was appointed as leader of the two-man Military Attaché at the British Embassy in Djakarta, Indonesia. He was assisted by Major Rory Walker.

=== The Indonesian Confrontation ===
During his posting the Indonesia–Malaysia confrontation began, when Britain as part of the dismantling of the Empire in Southeast Asia, proposed to combine its colonies on Borneo with the Federation of Malaya to form a new country called Malaysia. The move was opposed by neighbouring country of Indonesia, who believed that it was a ploy to increase British control over the region and would eventually threaten their independence.

On 16 September 1963, an organised mob of several thousand demonstrators formed in the city of Djakarta, they sacked the Malaysian Embassy before marching on the British Embassy where Becke and Walker were on guard, they tore down the Union Jack and burnt the Ambassador's car, then threw stones and pieces of concrete through the fence breaking all the embassy windows. In what is now a legendary act Walker strode up and down in front of the building, dodging the missiles and relentlessly playing his bagpipes despite pleas from the police and the leader of the demonstrators, eventually the mob broke up and the battle was won.

Two days later however the mob returned and broke through the fence besieging the building and eventually setting it on fire, Becke, Walker and the Ambassador Sir Andrew Gilchrist stood their ground taking a stand on British sovereign soil and defending the embassy strong room.

Becke's bravery in Jakarta earned him appointment as a Companion of the Most Distinguished Order of St Michael and St George (CMG) in the 1964 New Year Honours list. However, during the problems his bungalow was ransacked and torched and he lost everything. Becke retired from the army in 1966.

=== Post-retirement ===
Becke returned to the UK in 1966 and later decided to move to Australia with his wife. He gained the post of private secretary and comptroller to the last British governor of Victoria, Major-General Sir Rohan Delacombe. He left the UK for Victoria, Australia in 1974. He lived in the Cottage at Government House, Melbourne, entertaining many visitors. He continued as an honorary adjutant when he moved to become personnel officer with the Gas and Fuel Corporation of Victoria.

== Personal life ==
In 1945, Becke married Mary Richmond, a nurse from New South Wales who was serving in Scotland. He was a senior marshal for the RSL's Anzac Day march between 1977 and 1999, he was also a keen hockey player and he served as honorary treasurer of the National Trust spire appeal for Christ Church in South Yarra, where he was a committed member of the congregation.

== Death ==
Lt Colonel Becke died on 3 April 2009 in a nursing home in Toorak at the age of 92 after a long illness.
