= Andrew Gilchrist =

Sir Andrew Gilchrist KCMG
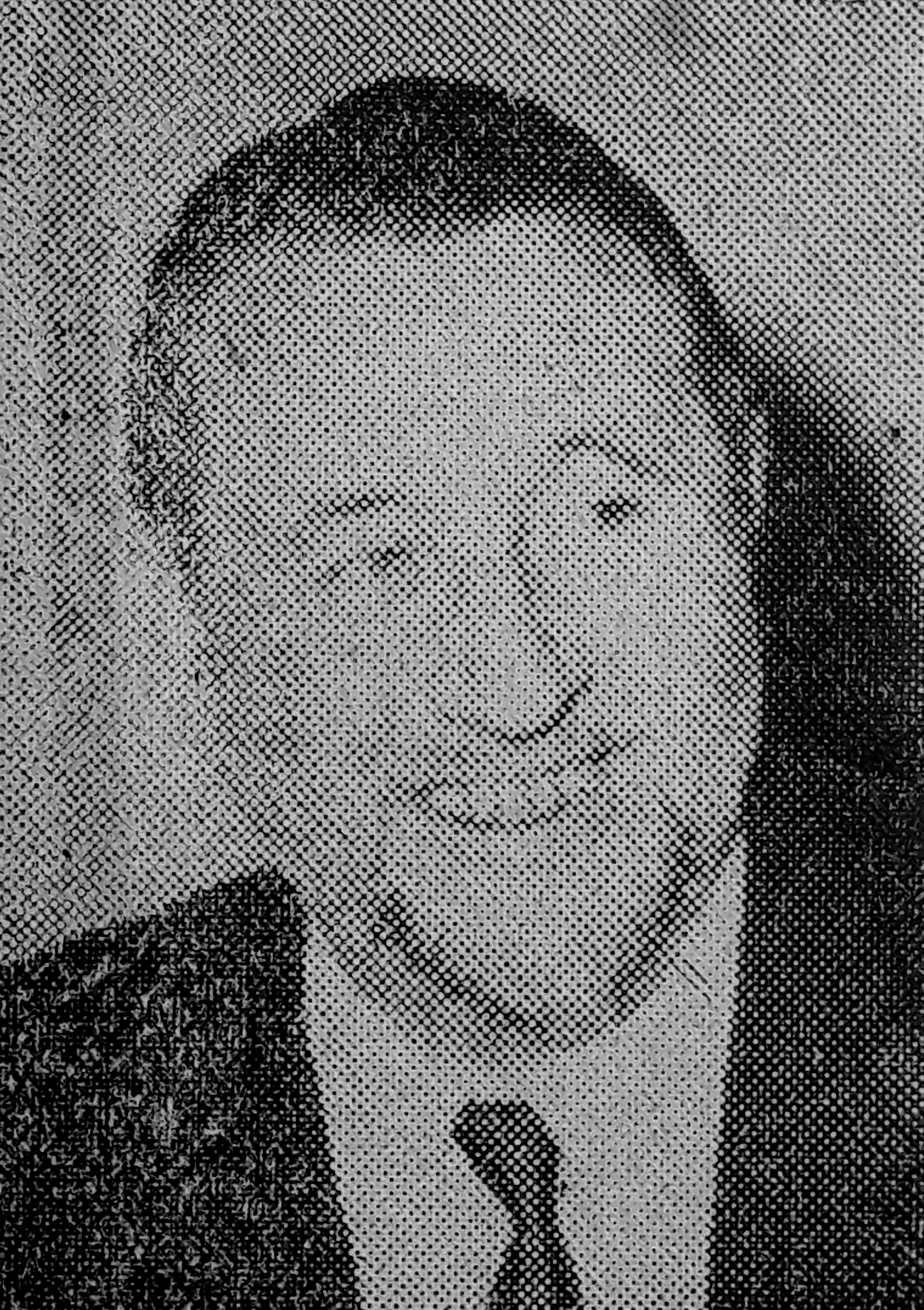
- 0

1st United Kingdom Ambassador to Iceland
- In office 1957–1959
- Preceded by: -
- Succeeded by: Andrew Charles Stewart (Charles Stewart)

4th United Kingdom Ambassador to Indochina
- In office 1961–1962
- Preceded by: Leslie Alfred Charles Fry (Leslie Fry)
- Succeeded by: Horace Phillips

4th United Kingdom Ambassador to Indonesia
- In office 1962–1966
- Preceded by: Leslie Alfred Charles Fry (Leslie Fry)
- Succeeded by: Horace Phillips

6th United Kingdom Ambassador to Ireland
- In office 1967–1970
- Preceded by: Sir Geofroy Tory
- Succeeded by: John Peck

Personal details
- Born: Andrew Graham Gilchrist; April 19, 1910 Lesmahagow, Scotland, Britain
- Died: March 6, 1993 (aged 82) 0
- Party: 0
- Other political affiliations: 0

Sir Andrew Graham Gilchrist KCMG (19 April 1910 – 6 March 1993) was a British Special Operations Executive operative who later served as the United Kingdom's Ambassador to Ireland, Indonesia, and Iceland during the Cold War.

== Early career in Foreign Office and SOE ==
Gilchrist was born on 19 April 1910 in the village of Lesmahagow, Lanarkshire, Scotland. He was educated at the Edinburgh Academy, before reading History at Exeter College, Oxford from where he graduated in 1931. After Oxford he entered the diplomatic service and had his first overseas posting in Siam, now Thailand.

During the war he spent time in a Japanese PoW camp, before being released in a prisoner exchange. He then joined SOE (Special Operations Executive) and was active in intelligence in India and Siam between 1944 and 1945. In a letter to his wife, he wrote harrowing accounts of worker camps along the Kra Isthmus Railway in Thailand under the Japanese.

In his retirement he wrote a scholarly account of Britain's disastrous military collapse in the Pacific Theater. Winston Churchill himself was singled out for criticism, for failing to protect British assets and placing too much reliance on the support of the US Pacific fleet.

After the war, in 1946 he married Freda Grace Slack and they raised three children: Janet (1947), Christopher (1948), and Jeremy (1951). He continued his career with postings to Iceland and Germany. In 1956, he was appointed British Ambassador to Reykjavík, Iceland. His time there included the First Cod War between the two countries. Anecdotes suggest that while the countries were threatening battle, he went fishing with an Icelandic minister. He later wrote a book about his time in Reykjavík entitled Cod Wars and How to Lose Them.

== Ambassador to Indonesia ==
After serving a stint as British Consul General to Chicago, Andrew Gilchrist served as British Ambassador to Jakarta, Indonesia (1962–1966). His time there saw an attack on the British Embassy in Jakarta on 16 September 1963, and the torching of his official car. The British consulate in Medan was also attacked. The Indonesians had been incensed by the decision of the Malayan Prime Minister Tunku Abdul Rahman and the Colonial Secretary Duncan Sandys to proceed with the inauguration of the Federation of Malaysia without first waiting for a United Nations ascertainment mission to complete its survey of public opinion in Sarawak and British North Borneo (modern–day Sabah). While the United Nations mission found majority support for Malaysia within the Borneo Territories, the Indonesian and Philippines governments regarded the Tunku-Sandys declaration as a violation of the Manila Accord. Thus, they refused to recognize the Malaysian Federation and demanded a new United Nations survey. Indonesia also accelerated its policy of Confrontation against Malaysia, by launching more cross-border raids into Sarawak and Sabah.

During the Malaysia diplomatic crisis, 10,000 members of the Indonesian Central Youth Front marched on the Malayan and British Embassies in Jakarta. The Malayan Embassy's First Secretary succeeded in calming the demonstrators by agreeing to transmit their demands to Kuala Lumpur. The Central Youth Front demonstrators then headed to the British Embassy, where they demanded to see Sir Andrew Gilchrist. During the demonstration, the British Embassy, which was a brand new extensively glazed building, had all 938 windows smashed by rocks hurled by the demonstrators. The assistant British military attache, Major Rory Walker, paraded outside the embassy compound while playing the bagpipes. Tensions further escalated when an argument broke out between the leaders of the Central Youth Front and the British Military Attache, Lt Colonel Bill Becke, over the number of delegates that would be admitted to the Embassy to present their protests to Gilchrist.

During the ensuing incident, several Indonesian demonstrators broke into the embassy compound, and burnt the Union Jack and Ambassador Gilchrist's car. Gilchrist finally agreed to meet a delegation from the demonstrators; however, their exchange failed to cool tensions and they departed. Gilchrist complained that the Indonesian police did little to disperse the Indonesian demonstrators and disputed the Indonesian demonstrators' account that Walker's bagpipe playing had preceded the stone throwing, or that the British behavior had been unnecessarily provocative. According to the British historian Matthew Jones, contemporary news reports of the confrontation at the British Embassy only reinforced the widespread Indonesian perception that the British diplomats had adopted an arrogant and condescending attitude to the local Indonesians who were concerned about developments within their region.

On 17 September 1963, the Malaysian Government formally severed relations with Indonesia and the Philippines. Malaysian demonstrators from the ruling United Malays National Organisation's youth wing also ransacked the Indonesian Embassy in Kuala Lumpur, stealing and desecrating the Indonesian national emblem. News reports of these developments further enraged public opinion in Indonesia. On 18 September, which fell on Ash Wednesday, the Indonesian demonstrators returned to the British Embassy and began burning its contents and tried to seize British documents. At that time, Gilchrist was returning from lunch with Walker, and ordering the latter to save the car they were driving, he joined twenty-two other British Embassy staff huddled in a corner of the compound. There, they remained for several hours while the building was ransacked and burnt by the demonstrators. During this incident, Gilchrist recalled being hit twice by bottles and stones hurled by the Indonesian demonstrators. Due to the large crowd, it took several hours for the police and fire service to breach the embassy compound and evacuate the diplomats to a safer area.

On the evening of 18 September 1963, British-owned homes, businesses, and cars throughout Jakarta were systematically attacked by groups of militant Indonesians with accurate information on their whereabouts. Trade unions affiliated with the Indonesian Communist Party (PKI) also began taking over British companies and officers. Over the next two days, PKI-affiliated trade unionists seized control of Royal Dutch Shell installations and British rubber estates throughout the country. In response to the PKI's calls for the nationalization of all British firms based on a blueprint developed during the West New Guinea dispute with the Dutch, the Indonesian Government officially took the seized British properties into "protective custody" and ended worker control. These aggressive take-overs, coupled by the severance of trade relations with Malaysia on 21 September 1963, exacerbated Indonesia's economic woes. The British Government viewed the destruction of the British Embassy and the takeovers of British assets in Indonesia as part of Jakarta's tactic of raising the tempo of its confrontation with Malaysia.

Britain was at the time strongly in favour of finding almost any means to help Indonesian opponents of Sukarno's communist-backed regime, helpful local propaganda certainly being one of them. Gilchrist reported to London that he had always believed that "more than a little shooting" would be necessary to bring about a change of regime. This turned out to be true as the Indonesian Army led by the pro-American General Suharto took control from Sukarno following an alleged Communist coup d'e'tat in October 1965 and launched a nationwide purge, killing over 500,000 Communists and sympathizers; wiping out the Indonesian Communist Party. Gilchrist received a Companion of the Order of St Michael and St George in 1956, and was knighted via Knight Commander of the Order of St Michael and St George in 1964.

== Ambassador to Ireland ==
Sir Andrew Gilchrist was sent, for his final posting before retirement, to Dublin as ambassador. A quiet time there was made impossible by the resurgence of "the troubles" and British troops being sent on to the streets of Northern Ireland in 1969. He claimed to have made a bet with the Permanent Secretary at the Foreign and Commonwealth Office that the troops would be there for 25 years. This proved to be true, though Gilchrist himself died just before this anniversary in 1993.

== Retirement and later life ==
After retiring from the Foreign Office in 1970, Gilchrist became the Chairman of the Highlands and Islands Development Board, a UK government quango which funded small start-up enterprises in what was a relatively poor region of the country.

In his retirement Gilchrist spent time curling, fishing and writing – in addition to his serious books on his time in Iceland, SOE's work in Siam and the fall of Malaya, he wrote a number of novels, including Did Van Gogh Paint His Bed? and some poetry. He was also a prodigious writer of letters to newspapers – principally The Times, The Scotsman and the Glasgow Herald. After his wife Freda died in 1987, he had a letter published in a British newspaper once a week on average until his death in 1993.

== List of works ==
=== Fiction ===
- The Russian Professor (1984)
- The Watercress File (1985)
- The Ultimate Hostage (1986)
- South of Three Pagodas (1987)
- Death of an Admiral (1988)
- Did Van Gogh Paint His Bed? (1991)

=== Non-fiction ===
- Bangkok Top Secret: Force 136 at War (1970)
- Cod Wars and How to Lose Them (1978)
- Malaya, 1941: The Fall of a Fighting Empire (1992)
