= Coronation of Elizabeth II =

1953 coronation in the United Kingdom

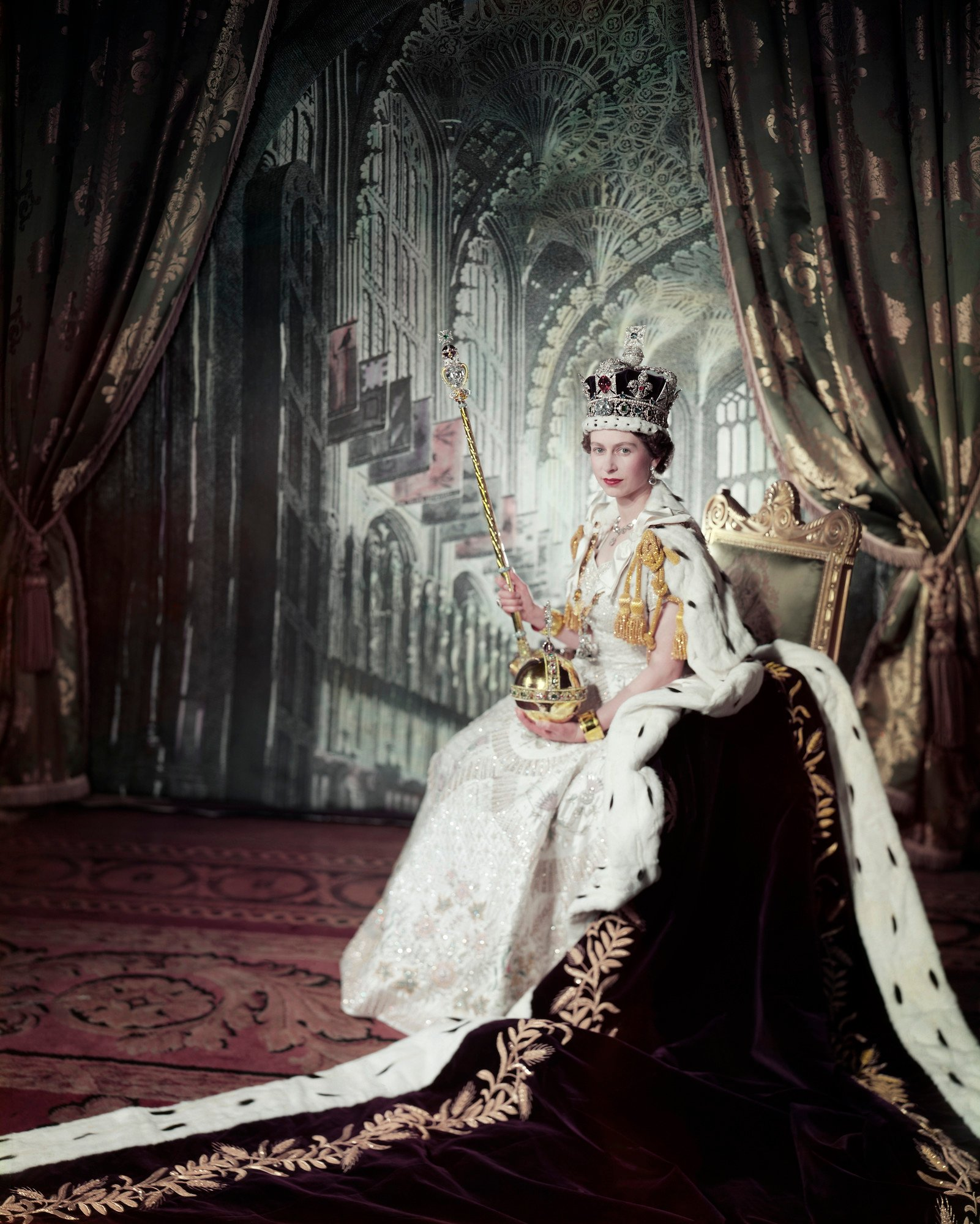
- Coronation portrait by Cecil Beaton, 1953
- Date: 2 June 1953; 73 years ago
- Venue: Westminster Abbey
- Location: London, England
- Budget: £1.57 million (estimates) (Note: equivalent to £38,081,967 in 2025)
- Participants: Queen Elizabeth II; Great Officers of State; Archbishops and bishops assistant of the Church of England; Garter Principal King of Arms; Peers of the Realm; Mistress of the Robes

The coronation of Elizabeth II as queen of the United Kingdom and the other Commonwealth realms took place on 2 June 1953 at Westminster Abbey in London. Elizabeth acceded to the throne at the age of 25 upon the death of her father, George VI, on 6 February 1952, being proclaimed queen by her privy and executive councils shortly afterwards. The coronation was held more than one year later because of the tradition of allowing an appropriate length of time to pass after a monarch dies. It also gave the planning committees adequate time to make preparations for the ceremony. During the service, Elizabeth took an oath, was anointed with holy oil, was invested with robes and regalia, and was crowned Queen of the United Kingdom, Canada, Australia, New Zealand, South Africa, Pakistan, and Ceylon (now Sri Lanka).

Celebrations took place across the Commonwealth realms and a commemorative medal was issued. It was the first British coronation to be fully televised; television cameras were not allowed inside the abbey during her parents' coronation in 1937. Elizabeth's was the fourth and final British coronation of the 20th century. It was estimated to have cost £1.57 million (c. £53,571,428 in 2023).

== Preparations ==
The one-day ceremony took 14 months of preparation: the first meeting of the Coronation Commission was in April 1952, under the chairmanship of the Queen's husband, Philip, Duke of Edinburgh. Other committees were also formed, such as the Coronation Joint Committee and the Coronation Executive Committee, both chaired by the Duke of Norfolk who, by convention as earl marshal, had overall responsibility for the event. Philip chairing the Commission was a break with precedent. Many physical preparations and decorations along the route were the responsibility of David Eccles, Minister of Works. Eccles described his role and that of the Earl Marshal: "The Earl Marshal is the producer – I am the stage manager..." Architect Hugh Casson designed street decorations for Westminster, and Eric Bedford designed the Coronation Arches erected over The Mall.

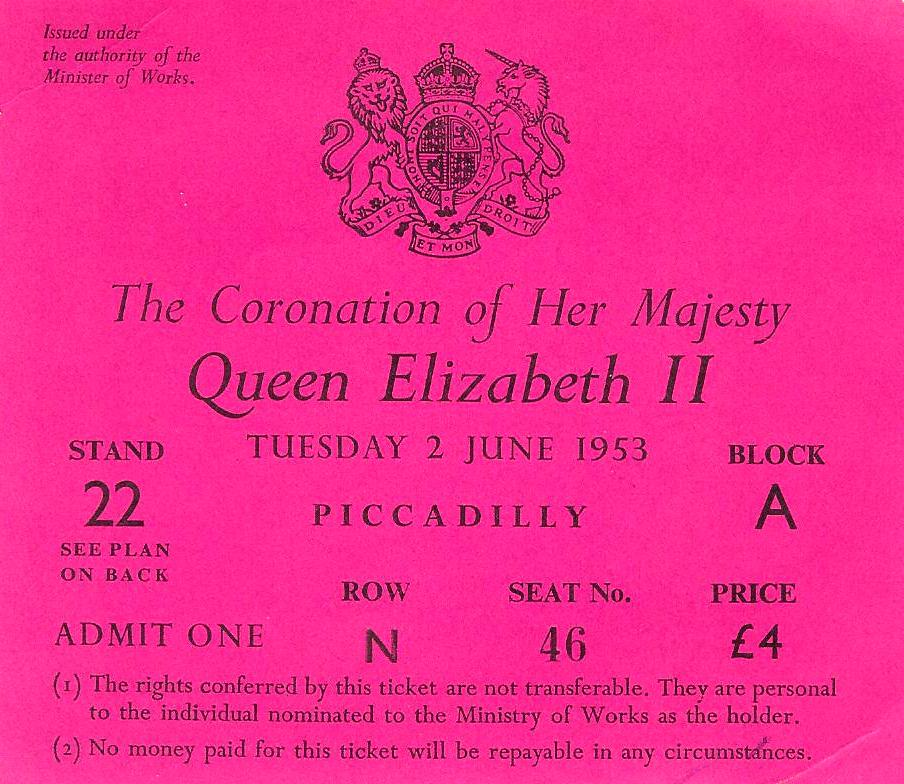
A ticket for the stands erected along the route of the procession to the abbey through Piccadilly Circus

The committees involved high commissioners from other Commonwealth realms, reflecting the international nature of the coronation; however, officials from other Commonwealth realms declined invitations to participate in the event because the governments of those countries considered the ceremony to be a religious rite unique to Britain. As Canadian Prime Minister Louis St. Laurent said at the time: "In my view the Coronation is the official enthronement of the Sovereign as Sovereign of the UK. We are happy to attend and witness the Coronation of the Sovereign of the UK but we are not direct participants in that function." The Coronation Commission announced in June 1952 that the coronation would take place on 2 June 1953.

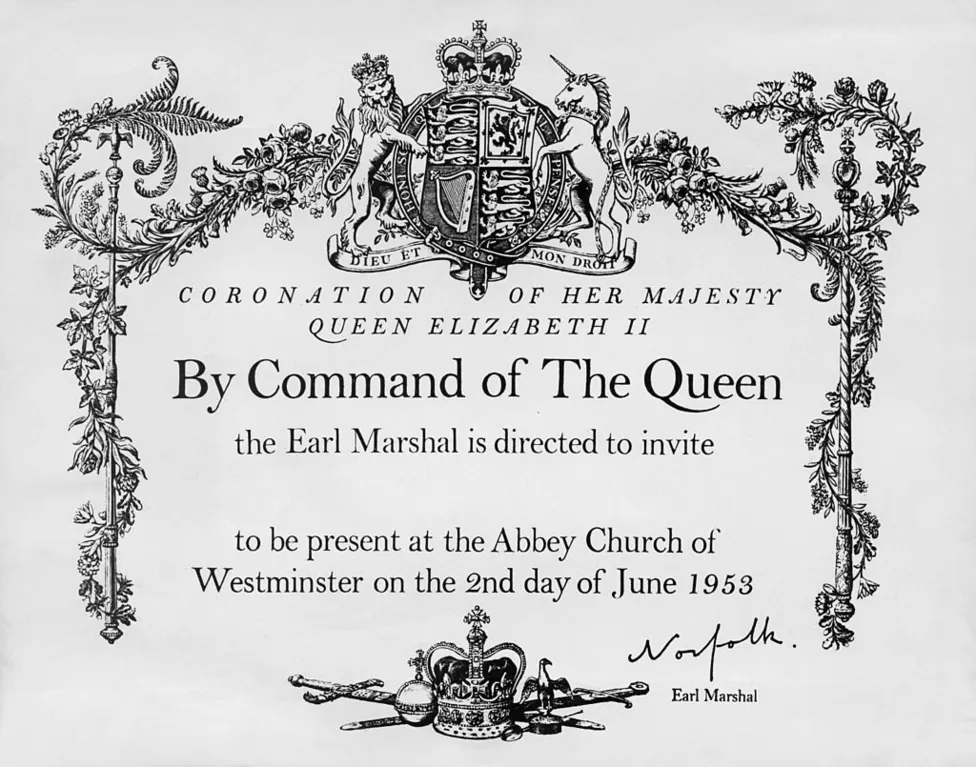
Coronation invitation designed by Joan Hassall

Invitations for the coronation were designed by the illustrator Joan Hassall; she had to use scraperboard to produce the final design as there was not enough time to produce a wood engraving for such a large and complex design. She also designed the personal invitation that Prince Charles received to the coronation.

Norman Hartnell was commissioned by the Queen to design the outfits for all members of the royal family, including Elizabeth's coronation gown. His design for the gown evolved through nine proposals, and the final version resulted from his own research and numerous meetings with the Queen: a white silk dress embroidered with floral emblems of the countries of the Commonwealth at the time: the Tudor rose of England, Scottish thistle, Welsh leek, shamrock for Northern Ireland, wattle of Australia, maple leaf of Canada, the New Zealand silver fern, South Africa's protea, two lotus flowers for India and Ceylon, and Pakistan's wheat, cotton and jute. Roger Vivier created a pair of gold shoes for the occasion. The sandals featured jewel-encrusted heels and decorative motif on the upper sides, which was meant to resemble "the fleurs-de-lis pattern on the St Edward's Crown and the Imperial State Crown". Elizabeth chose to wear the Coronation necklace for the event. The piece was commissioned by Queen Victoria and worn by Queens Alexandra, Mary, and Elizabeth at their respective coronations. She paired it with the Coronation earrings.

Elizabeth rehearsed for the occasion with her maids of honour. A sheet was used in place of the velvet train, and a formation of chairs stood in for the carriage. She also wore the Imperial State Crown while going about her daily business – at her desk, during tea, and while reading a newspaper – so that she could become accustomed to its feel and weight. Elizabeth took part in two full rehearsals at Westminster Abbey, on 22 and 29 May, though some sources claim that she attended one or "several" rehearsals. The Duchess of Norfolk usually stood in for the Queen at rehearsals. Westminster Abbey was closed for five months in preparation for the coronation.

Elizabeth's grandmother Queen Mary had died on 24 March 1953, having stated in her will that her death should not affect the planning of the coronation, and the event went ahead as scheduled. It was estimated to cost £1.57 million (c£. 52,900,000 in 2024), which included stands along the procession route to accommodate 96,000 people, lavatories, street decorations, outfits, car hire, repairs to the state coach, and alterations to the Queen's regalia.

== Event ==
External videos
- Elizabeth is Queen (1953) a colour documentary by British Pathé

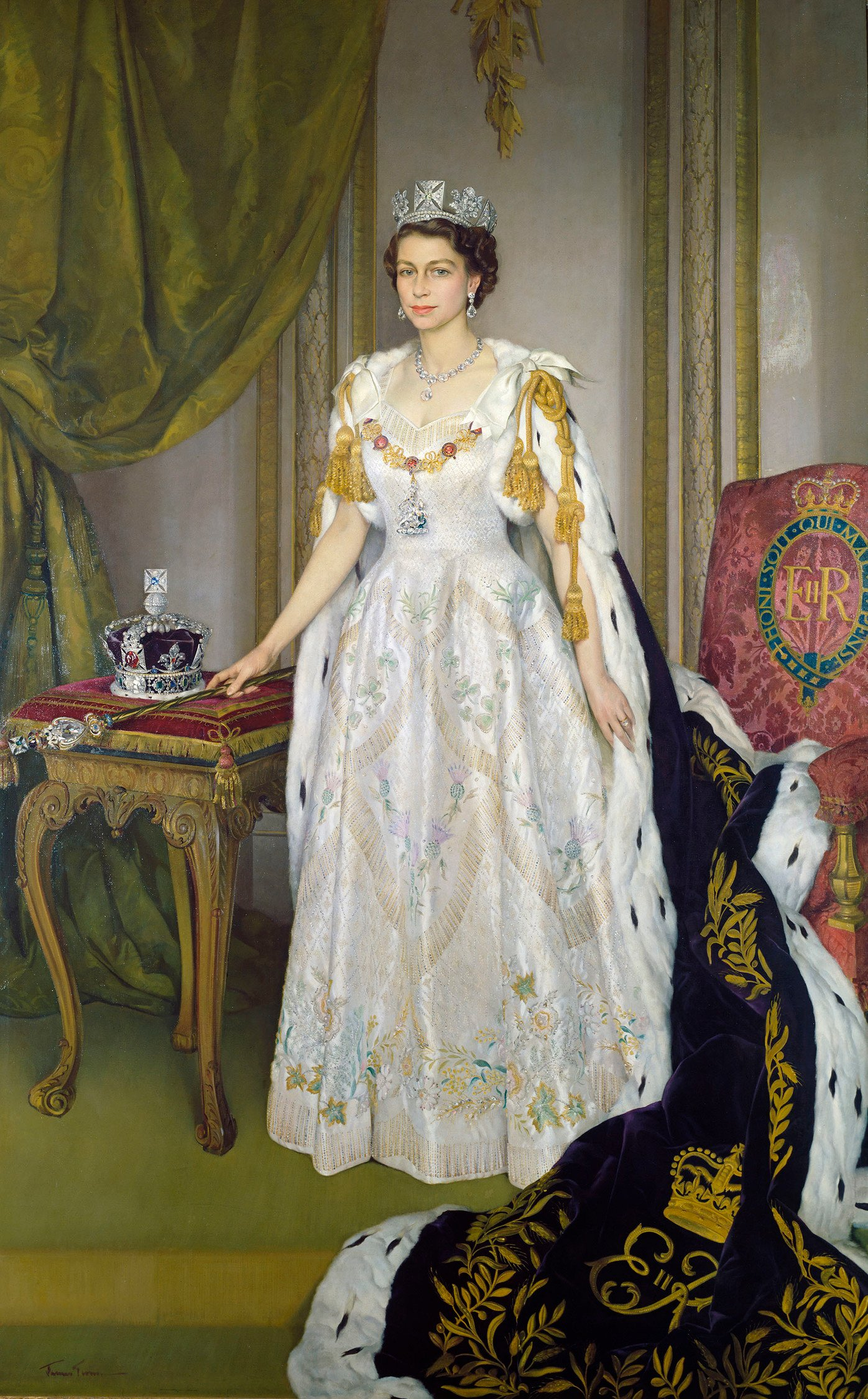
The state portrait of Queen Elizabeth II painted by Sir Herbert James Gunn to commemorate the coronation

The coronation ceremony of Elizabeth II followed a pattern similar to the coronations of the kings and queens before her, being held in Westminster Abbey, and involving the peerage and clergy. However, for the new queen, several parts of the ceremony were markedly different.

=== Television ===
Twenty-seven million people across Britain watched the event live on the BBC Television Service, many having purchased or rented television sets specifically for that purpose. The number of licence holders doubled from approximately one and a half million to three million. The coronation was the first to be televised in full; the BBC's cameras had not been allowed inside Westminster Abbey for Queen Elizabeth II's parents' coronation in 1937 and had covered only the procession outside. There had been considerable debate within the British Cabinet on the subject, with Prime Minister Winston Churchill against the idea; Elizabeth refused his advice on this matter and insisted the event take place before television cameras, as well as those filming with experimental 3D technology. (Note: This footage was in 2010 used in the Canadian Broadcasting Corporation's first 3D television broadcast, the first time the images had been shown on television.) An experiment in colour television, separate from the BBC's black-and-white television broadcast, was transmitted to children at the Great Ormond Street Hospital, where an average of 17 people watched each small screen.

In Europe, thanks to new relay links, this was the first live broadcast of an event taking place in the United Kingdom. The coronation was broadcast in France, Belgium, West Germany, Denmark, and the Netherlands, marking the birth of Eurovision.

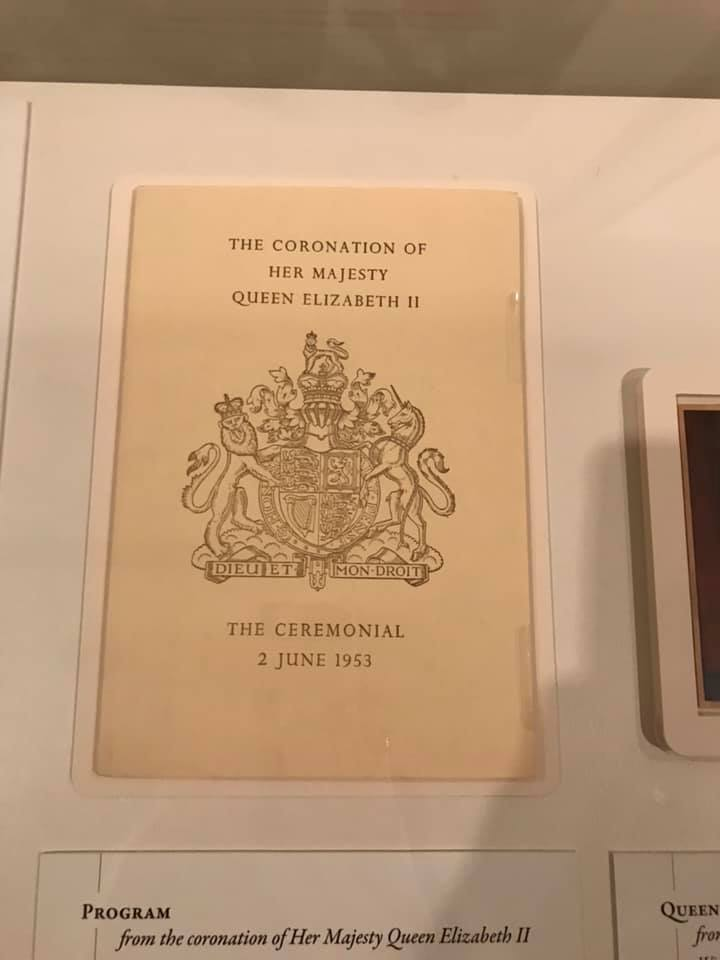
A programme for Queen Elizabeth II's coronation; photo of the programme taken at the Winterthur Museum, Garden and Library in 2019.

To make sure Canadians could see it on the same day, Operation Pony Express was executed, seeing RAF Canberras fly BBC film recordings of the ceremony across the Atlantic Ocean to be broadcast by the Canadian Broadcasting Corporation (CBC), the first non-stop flights between the United Kingdom and the Canadian mainland. At Goose Bay, Labrador, the first batch of film was transferred to a Royal Canadian Air Force CF-100 jet fighter for the further trip to Montreal. In all, three such flights were made as the coronation proceeded, with the first and second Canberras taking the second and third batches of film, respectively, to Montreal. The following day, a film was flown west to Vancouver, where the CBC Television affiliate had yet to sign on. The film was escorted by the Royal Canadian Mounted Police to the Peace Arch Border Crossing, after which it was escorted by the Washington State Patrol to Bellingham, where it was shown as the inaugural broadcast of KVOS-TV, a new station whose signal reached into the Lower Mainland of British Columbia, allowing viewers there to see the coronation as well, though on a one-day delay.

US networks NBC and CBS made similar arrangements to have films flown in relays back to the United States for same-day broadcast, but they used slower propeller-driven aircraft. NBC had originally planned to carry the event live via skywave direct from the BBC. However, the station was unable to establish a broadcast-quality video link on coronation day, due to poor atmospheric conditions. The struggling ABC network arranged to re-transmit the CBC broadcast, taking the on-the-air signal from the CBC's Toronto station and feeding the network from WBEN-TV, Buffalo's lone television station at the time; as a result, ABC beat the other two networks to air and at considerably lower cost, followed by NBC which had made a last-minute deal with ABC. However, the Canadian broadcast was the first in North America, viewers in eastern Canada watching the ceremony a half hour before Americans did.

Although it did not as yet have a full-time television service, film was also dispatched to Australia aboard a Qantas airliner, which arrived in Sydney in a record time of 53 hours 28 minutes. The worldwide television audience for the coronation was estimated to be 277 million. Additionally, 11 million in the UK listened to the broadcast on radio.

=== Procession ===
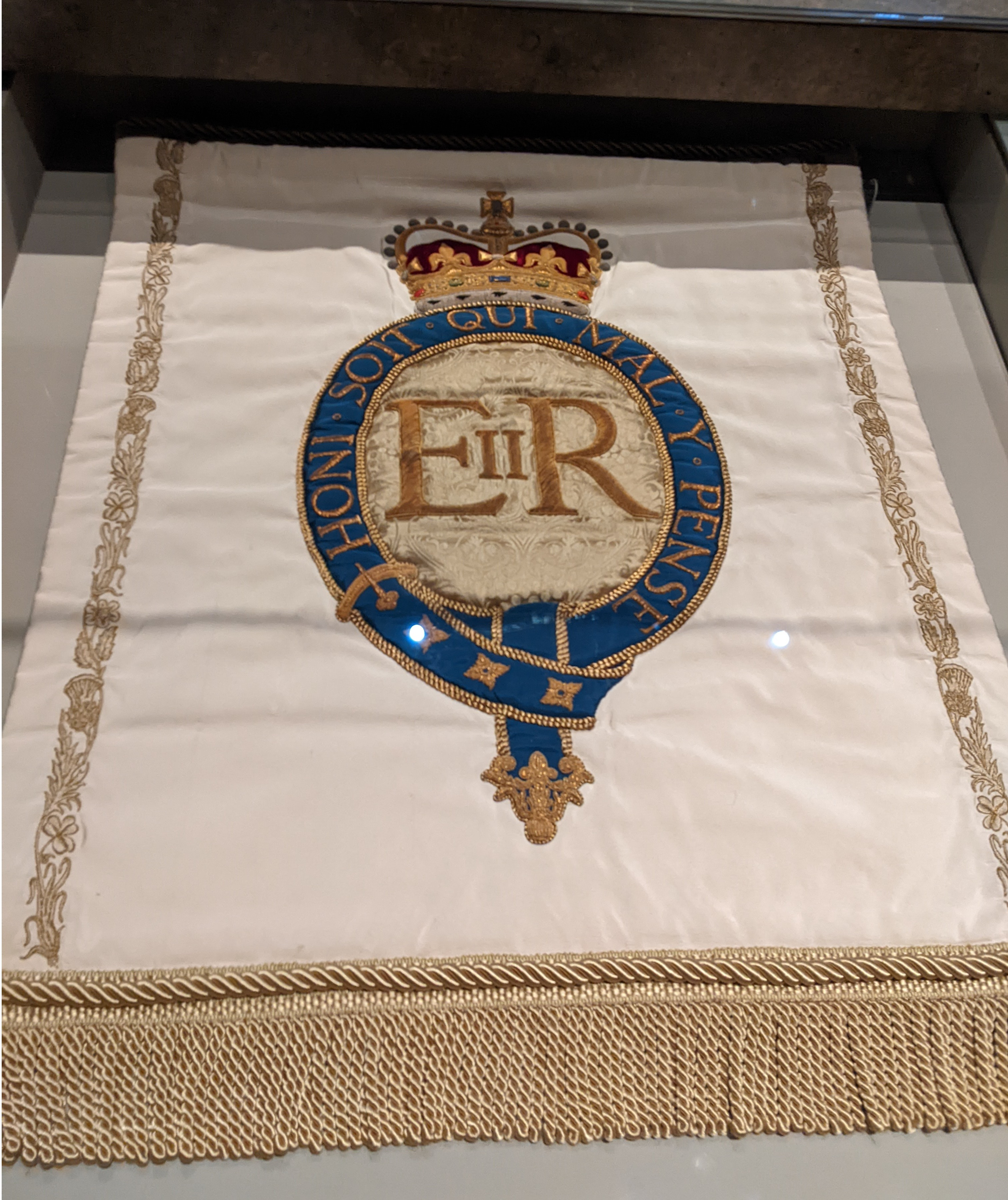
A silk banner that was displayed in Westminster Abbey featuring a crowned garter and the cypher EIIR

Along a route lined with sailors, soldiers, and airmen and women from across the British Empire and Commonwealth, (Note: Including 856 representing the Canadian Army, Royal Canadian Navy, and Royal Canadian Air Force.) guests and officials passed in a procession before about three million spectators that were gathered on the streets of London, some having camped overnight in their spot to ensure a view of the monarch, and others having access to specially built stands and scaffolding along the route. For those not present, more than 200 microphones were stationed along the path and in Westminster Abbey, with 750 commentators broadcasting in 39 languages.

The procession included foreign royalty and heads of state riding to Westminster Abbey in various carriages, so many that volunteers ranging from wealthy businessmen to rural landowners were required to supplement the insufficient ranks of regular footmen. The first royal coach left Buckingham Palace and moved down the Mall, which was filled with flag-waving and cheering crowds. It was followed by the Irish State Coach carrying Queen Elizabeth The Queen Mother, who wore the circlet of her crown bearing the Koh-i-Noor diamond. Queen Elizabeth II proceeded through London from Buckingham Palace, through Trafalgar Square, and towards the abbey in the Gold State Coach drawn by eight grey geldings. The Royal Mews staff placed a hot water bottle under the coach's seat to keep the Queen and the Duke of Edinburgh warm. Attached to the shoulders of her dress, the Queen wore the Robe of State, a 6-yard (5.5 m) long, hand woven silk velvet cloak lined with Canadian ermine that required the assistance of her maids of honour— Lady Jane Vane-Tempest-Stewart, Lady Anne Coke, Lady Moyra Hamilton, Lady Mary Baillie-Hamilton, Lady Jane Heathcote-Drummond-Willoughby, Lady Rosemary Spencer-Churchill and the Duchess of Devonshire—to carry.

The return procession followed a route that was 5.1 miles (8.2 km) in length, passing along Whitehall, across Trafalgar Square, along Pall Mall and Piccadilly to Hyde Park Corner, via Marble Arch and Oxford Circus, down Regent Street and Haymarket, and finally along the Mall to Buckingham Palace. 29,000 service personnel from Britain and across the Commonwealth marched in a procession that was 2 miles (3.2 km) long and took 45 minutes to pass any given point. A further 15,800 lined the route. The parade was led by Colonel Burrows of the War Office staff and four regimental bands. Then came the colonial contingents, then troops from the Commonwealth realms, followed by the Royal Air Force, the British Army, the Royal Navy, and finally the Household Brigade. Behind the marching troops was a carriage procession led by the rulers of the British protectorates, including Queen Sālote Tupou III of Tonga, the Commonwealth prime ministers, the princes and princesses of the blood royal, and Queen Elizabeth The Queen Mother. Preceded by the heads of the British Armed Forces on horseback, the Gold State Coach was escorted by the Yeomen of the Guard and the Household Cavalry and was followed by the Queen's aides-de-camp. So many carriages were required that some had to be borrowed from Elstree Studios.

After the end of the procession, the royal family appeared on the balcony of Buckingham Palace to watch a flypast. The flypast had been altered on the day due to the bad weather, but otherwise took place as planned. 168 jet fighters flew overhead in three divisions thirty seconds apart, at an altitude of 1,500 feet. (Note: The aircraft were 144 Gloster Meteors of the Royal Air Force and 24 Canadair Sabres of the Royal Canadian Air Force, commanded by Air Vice Marshal the Earl of Bandon, who would later organise the larger RAF Coronation Review flypast in July.)

=== Guests ===
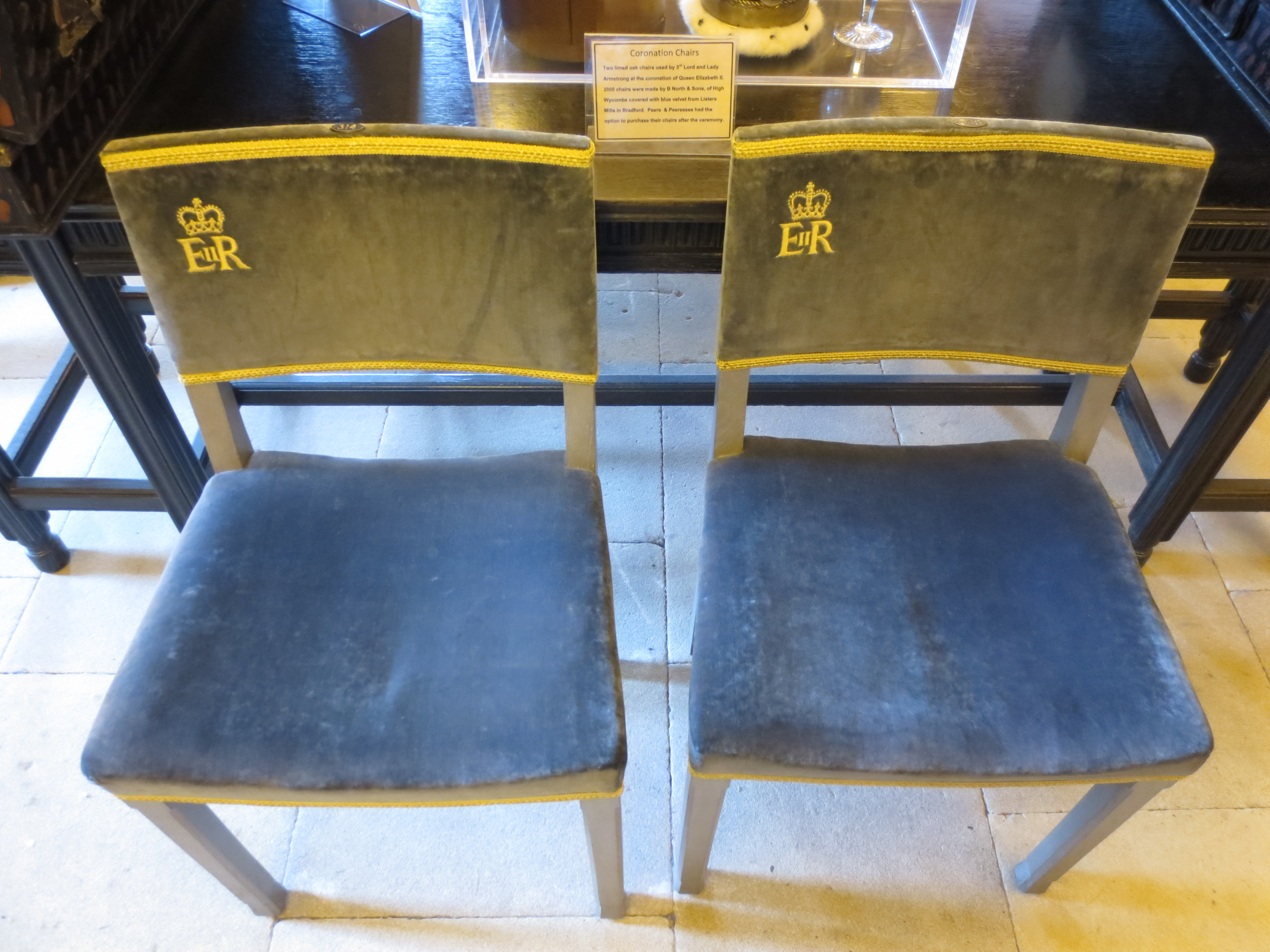
The chairs used at the coronation

After being closed since the Queen's accession for coronation preparations, Westminster Abbey was opened at 6 a.m. on Coronation Day to the approximately 8,000 guests invited from across the British Empire and Commonwealth of Nations; (Note: From Canada came the prime minister, Louis St. Laurent, and five other members of the federal Cabinet, the chief justice, the speakers of the House of Commons and Senate, the leaders of Her Majesty's Loyal Opposition in the same two houses, and the leader of the Government in the Senate, Lieutenant Governor of Ontario Louis Breithaupt and his premier, Leslie Frost, as well as Premier of Saskatchewan Tommy Douglas, Quebec Cabinet ministers Onésime Gagnon and John Samuel Bourque, Mayor of Toronto Allan A. Lamport, and Chief of the Squamish Nation Joe Mathias.) more prominent individuals, such as members of the Queen's family and foreign royalty, the peers of the United Kingdom, heads of state, members of Parliament from the Queen's various legislatures, and the like, arrived after 8:30 a.m. Queen Sālote of Tonga was a guest, and was noted for her cheery demeanour while riding in an open carriage through London in the rain. General George Marshall, the former United States secretary of state who implemented the Marshall Plan, was appointed chairman of the US delegation to the coronation and attended the ceremony along with his wife, Katherine.

Among other dignitaries who attended the event were Sir Winston Churchill; the prime ministers of Burma, India and Pakistan, U Nu, Jawaharlal Nehru and Mohammad Ali Bogra; and Col Anastasio Somoza Debayle of Nicaragua. 129 nations and territories were represented by their dignitaries at the service. Foreign and Commonwealth representatives were also invited to two banquets hosted by the Queen at Buckingham Palace. Edward, Duke of Windsor, the former King Edward VIII, was entitled to be invited to attend as a Royal Duke but he opted not to as his wife Wallis was explicitly not invited. Edward also cited a constitutional convention that no reigning or former sovereign should attend a British coronation.

The Queen later revealed that some peers had hidden sandwiches underneath their coronets to fuel them through the three-hour ceremony. Guests seated on stools were able to purchase their stools following the ceremony, with the profits going towards the cost of the coronation.

=== Ceremony ===
Members of the royal family at the coronation, including the four-year-old Prince Charles (centre right)

Preceding the Queen into Westminster Abbey was the coronation regalia, including the Second Sword, carried by the Earl of Home, Curtana carried by the Duke of Northumberland, the Third Sword carried by the Duke of Buccleuch and Queensbury and St Edward's Crown, carried into the abbey by the Lord High Steward of England, the Lord Cunningham of Hyndhope flanked by two other peers. The archbishops and bishops assistant (Durham and Bath and Wells) of the Church of England, in their copes and mitres, waited outside the Great West Door for Queen Elizabeth II's arrival. When she arrived at about 11:00 a.m., she found that the friction between her robes and the carpet caused her difficulty moving forward, and she said to the Archbishop of Canterbury, Geoffrey Fisher, "Get me started!" Once going, the procession, which included the various high commissioners of the Commonwealth carrying banners bearing the shields of the coats of arms of their respective nations, moved inside the abbey, up the central aisle and through the choir to the stage, as the choirs sang I was glad, an imperial setting of Psalm 122, verses 1–3, 6, and 7 by Sir Hubert Parry. As Elizabeth prayed at and then seated herself on the Chair of Estate to the south of the altar, the bishops carried in the religious paraphernalia—the Bible, paten and chalice—and the peers holding the coronation regalia handed them over to the archbishop of Canterbury, who, in turn, passed them to the dean of Westminster, Alan Don, to be placed on the altar.

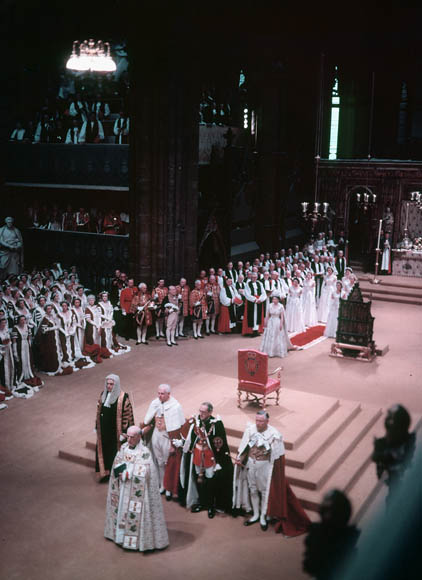
Elizabeth proceeding past the Coronation Chair, the darker chair at right

After she moved to stand before King Edward's Chair, Elizabeth turned, following as Fisher, along with the Lord High Chancellor of Great Britain, the Lord Simonds; the Lord Great Chamberlain of England, the Marquess of Cholmondeley; the Lord High Constable of England, the Viscount Alanbrooke; and the Earl Marshal of England, the Duke of Norfolk; all led by Garter Principal King of Arms George Bellew. The Archbishop of Canterbury asked the audience in each direction of the compass separately: "Sirs, I here present unto you Queen Elizabeth, your undoubted Queen: wherefore all you who are come this day to do your homage and service, are you willing to do the same?" The crowd would reply "God save Queen Elizabeth!" every time, to each of which the Queen would curtsey in return.

Seated again on the Chair of Estate, Elizabeth then took the coronation oath as administered by the archbishop of Canterbury. In the lengthy oath, she swore to govern each of her countries according to their respective laws and customs, to mete out law and justice with mercy, to uphold Protestantism in the United Kingdom and protect the Church of England and preserve its bishops and clergy. She proceeded to the altar where she stated, "The things which I have here promised, I will perform, and keep. So help me God", before kissing the Bible and putting the royal sign-manual to the oath as the Bible was returned to the dean of Westminster. From him the Moderator of the General Assembly of the Church of Scotland, James Pitt-Watson, took the Bible and presented it to Elizabeth again, saying,

Our gracious Queen: to keep your Majesty ever mindful of the law and the Gospel of God as the Rule for the whole life and government of Christian Princes, we present you with this Book, the most valuable thing that this world affords. Here is Wisdom; This is the royal Law; These are the lively Oracles of God.

Elizabeth returned the book to Pitt-Watson, who placed it back with the dean of Westminster.

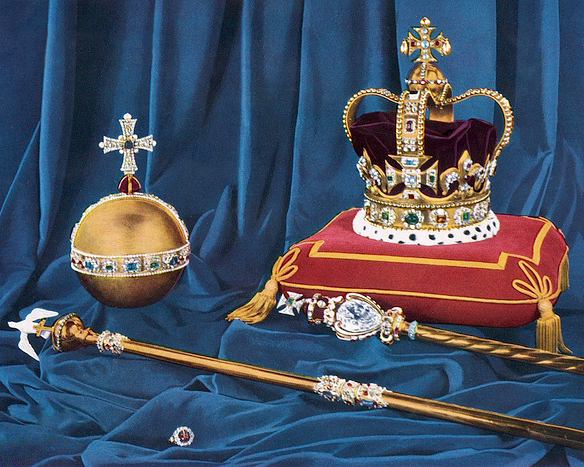
St Edward's Crown, the Orb, the Sceptre with Cross, Sceptre with Dove, and the Ring

The communion service was then conducted, involving prayers by both the clergy and Elizabeth, Fisher asking, "O God... Grant unto this thy servant Elizabeth, our Queen, the spirit of wisdom and government, that being devoted unto thee with her whole heart, she may so wisely govern, that in her time thy Church may be in safety, and Christian devotion may continue in peace", before reading various excerpts from the First Epistle of Peter, Psalms, and the Gospel of Matthew. Elizabeth was then anointed as the choir sang Zadok the Priest; the Queen's jewellery and crimson cape were removed by the Earl of Ancaster and the Mistress of the Robes, the Duchess of Devonshire and, wearing only a simple, white linen dress also designed by Hartnell to completely cover the coronation gown, she moved to be seated in King Edward's Chair. There, Fisher, assisted by the Dean of Westminster, made a cross on her forehead, hands and breast with holy oil made from the same base as had been used in the coronation of her father. A gold canopy borne aloft by four Knights of the Garter on poles shielded her, and at her request, the anointing ceremony was not televised.

From the altar, the dean passed to the Lord Great Chamberlain the spurs, which were presented to Elizabeth and then placed back on the altar. The Sword of State was then handed to Elizabeth, who, after a prayer was uttered by Fisher, placed it herself on the altar, and the peer who had been previously holding it took it back again after paying a sum of 100 shillings. Elizabeth was then invested with the Armills (bracelets), Stole Royal, Robe Royal and the Sovereign's Orb, followed by the Sovereign's Ring, the Sovereign's Sceptre with Cross and the Sovereign's Sceptre with Dove. With the first two items on and in her right hand and the latter in her left, Queen Elizabeth II was crowned by the archbishop of Canterbury, with the crowd chanting "God save the Queen!" three times at the exact moment St Edward's Crown touched the monarch's head. The princes and peers gathered then put on their coronets and a 21-gun salute was fired from the Tower of London.

The Duke of Edinburgh swearing allegiance to his wife

With the benediction read, Elizabeth moved to the throne and the archbishop of Canterbury and all the bishops offered to her their fealty, after which, while the choir sang, the peers of the United Kingdom—led by the royal peers: Elizabeth's husband; her uncle the Duke of Gloucester; and her cousin the Duke of Kent—each proceeded, in order of precedence, to pay their personal homage and allegiance. After the royal peers, the 5 most senior peers, one for each rank, offered their fealty as representatives of the peerage of the United Kingdom: Norfolk for Dukes and Duchesses, the Marquess Huntly for Marquesses and Marchionesses, the Earl of Shrewsbury for Earls and Countesses, the Viscount of Arbuthnott for Viscounts and Viscountesses and the Lord Mowbray for Barons and Baronesses.

When the last Baron had completed this task, the assembly shouted "God save Queen Elizabeth. Long live Queen Elizabeth. May the Queen live for ever!" Having removed all her royal regalia, Elizabeth knelt and took the communion, including a general confession and absolution, and, along with the congregation, recited the Lord's Prayer.

Now wearing the Imperial State Crown and holding the Sceptre with the Cross and the Orb, and as the gathered guests sang "God Save the Queen", Elizabeth left Westminster Abbey through the nave and apse, out the Great West Door.

=== Music ===
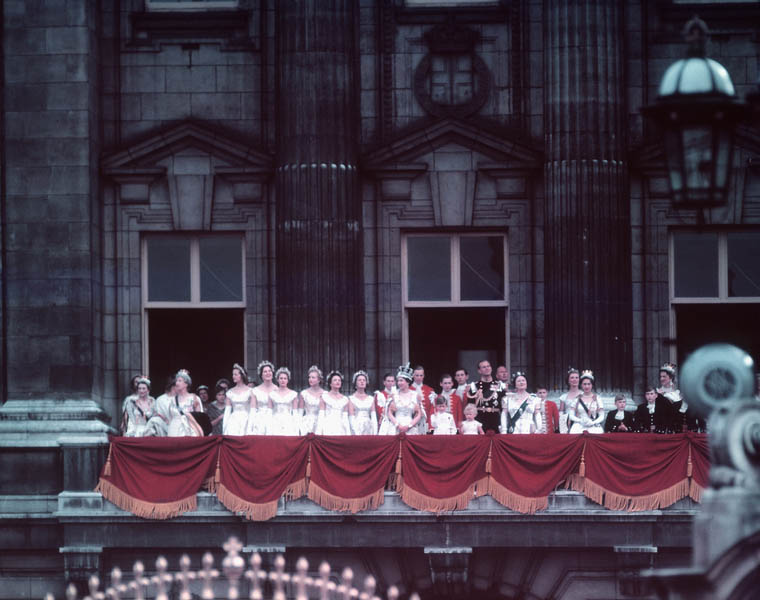
Appearance of the royal family on the balcony of Buckingham Palace after the coronation

Although many had assumed that the master of the queen's music, Sir Arnold Bax, would be the director of music for the coronation, it was decided instead to appoint the organist and master of the choristers at the abbey, William McKie, who had been in charge of music at the royal wedding in 1947. McKie convened an advisory committee with Sir Arnold Bax and Sir Ernest Bullock, who had directed the music for the previous coronation.

When it came to choosing the music, tradition required that Handel's Zadok the Priest and Parry's I was glad were included amongst the anthems. Other choral works included were the anonymous 16th century anthem "Rejoice in the Lord alway" and Samuel Sebastian Wesley's Thou wilt keep him in perfect peace. Another tradition was that new works be commissioned from the leading composers of the day: Ralph Vaughan Williams composed a new motet O Taste and See, William Walton composed a setting for the Te Deum, and the Canadian composer Healey Willan wrote an anthem O Lord our Governor. Four new orchestral pieces were planned; Arthur Bliss composed Processional; Walton, Orb and Sceptre; and Arnold Bax, Coronation March. Benjamin Britten had agreed to compose a piece, but he caught influenza and then had to deal with flooding at Aldeburgh, so nothing was forthcoming. Edward Elgar's Pomp and Circumstance March No. 1 in D was played immediately before Bax's march at the end of the ceremony. An innovation, at the suggestion of Vaughan Williams, was the inclusion of a hymn in which the congregation could participate. This proved controversial and was not included in the programme until Elizabeth had been consulted and found to be in favour; Vaughan Williams wrote an elaborate arrangement of the traditional metrical psalm, the Old Hundredth, which included military trumpet fanfares and was sung before the communion. Gordon Jacob wrote a choral arrangement of God Save the Queen, also with trumpet fanfares.

The choir for the coronation was a combination of the choirs of Westminster Abbey, St Paul's Cathedral, the Chapel Royal, and Saint George's Chapel, Windsor. In addition to those established choirs, the Royal School of Church Music conducted auditions to find twenty boy trebles from parish church choirs representing the various regions of the United Kingdom. Along with twelve trebles chosen from various British cathedral choirs, the selected boys spent the month beforehand training at Addington Palace. The final complement of choristers comprised 182 boy trebles, 37 male altos, 62 tenors and 67 basses. The orchestra, of 60 players, was drawn from the leading members of British symphony orchestras and chamber ensembles. Each of the 18 violinists, headed by Paul Beard, was the leader of a major orchestra or chamber group. The conductor was Sir Adrian Boult, who had conducted the orchestra at the previous coronation.

== Celebrations, monuments, and media ==
The Queen's Coronation Day broadcast
The Queen's speech to the Commonwealth and Empire in the evening of her Coronation Day

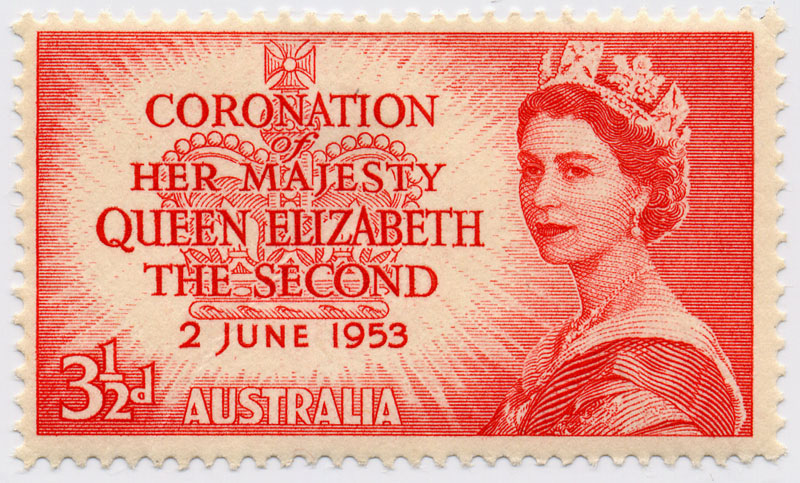
Australian stamp issued for the coronation of Queen Elizabeth II

In the evening on 2 June, the Queen made a live radio broadcast to thank the public. All across the Queen's realms, the rest of the Commonwealth, and in other parts of the world, coronation celebrations were held. The British government announced an extra bank holiday that fell on 3 June and moved the last bank holiday in May to 2 June to allow for an extended time of celebrations. The Queen Elizabeth II Coronation Medal was also presented to thousands of recipients throughout the Queen's realms and in Canada, New Zealand, South Africa, and the UK, commemorative coins were issued. Three million bronze coronation medallions were ordered by the Canadian government, struck by the Royal Canadian Mint and distributed to schoolchildren across the country; the obverse showed Elizabeth's effigy and the reverse the royal cypher above the word CANADA, all circumscribed by ELIZABETH II REGINA CORONATA MCMLIII.

As at the coronation of George VI, acorns shed from oaks in Windsor Great Park, near Windsor Castle, were shipped around the Commonwealth and planted in parks, school grounds, cemeteries and private gardens to grow into what are known as Royal Oaks or Coronation Oaks.

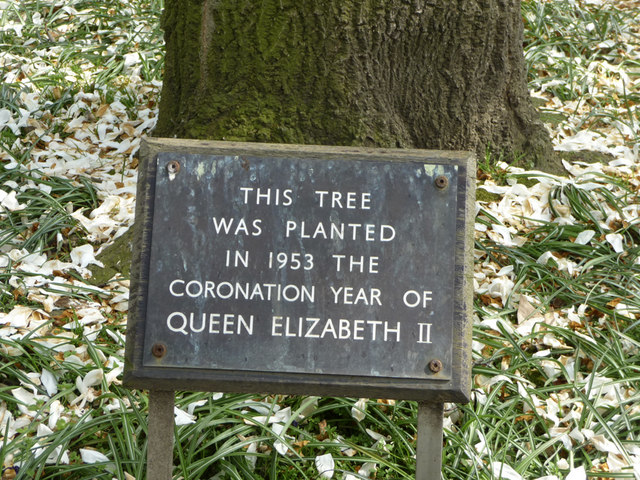
A plaque marking a tree planted in the United Kingdom to commemorate the coronation of Queen Elizabeth II

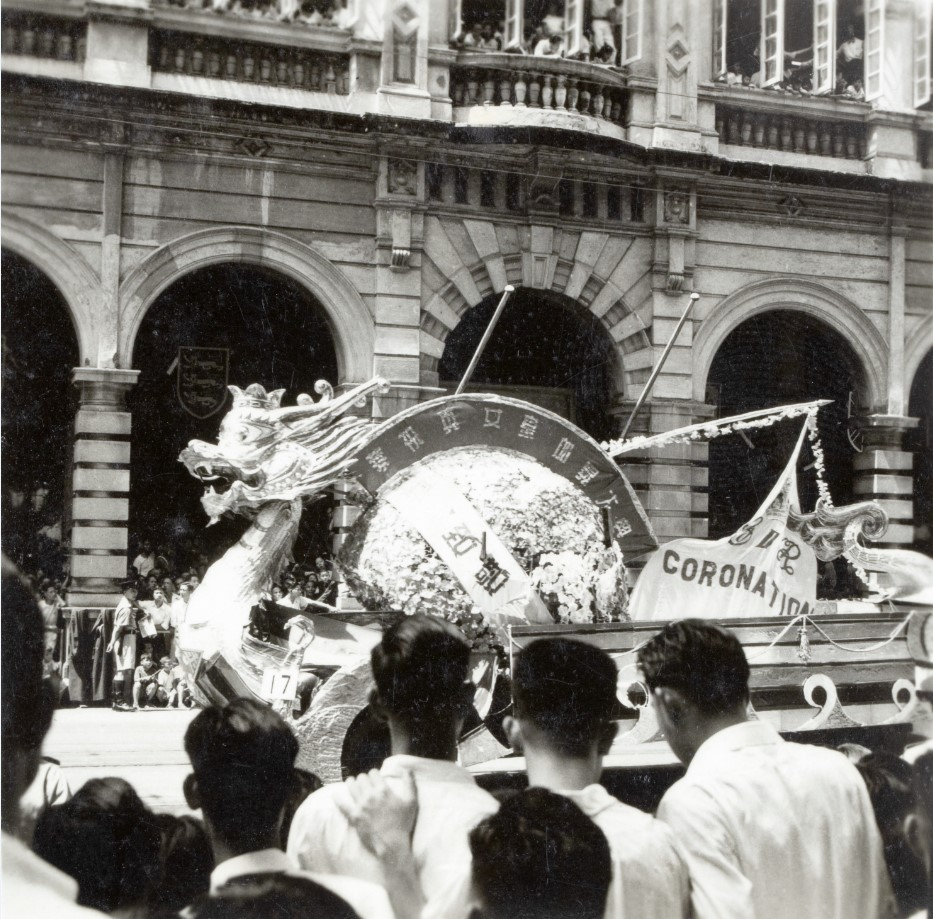
A street celebration in Hong Kong for the coronation of Queen Elizabeth II in 1953

In London, the Queen hosted a coronation luncheon, for which the recipe coronation chicken was devised, and a fireworks show was mounted on Victoria Embankment. Further, street parties were mounted around the United Kingdom. The Coronation Cup football tournament was held at Hampden Park, Glasgow in May, and two weeks before the coronation, the children's literary magazine Collins Magazine rebranded itself as The Young Elizabethan. News that Edmund Hillary and Tenzing Norgay had reached the summit of Mount Everest arrived in Britain on Elizabeth's coronation day; the New Zealand, American, and British media dubbed it "a coronation gift for the new Queen". In the following month, a pageant took place over the River Thames as a coronation tribute to the Queen.

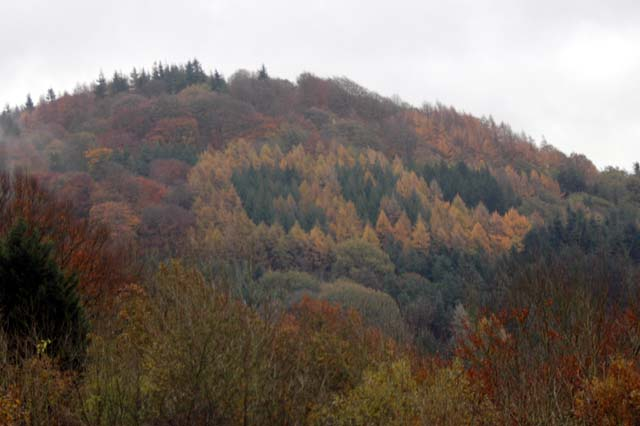
A stand of trees near Monmouth in south Wales, planted in the form of the letters ER (Elizabeth Regina) to commemorate the coronation of Queen Elizabeth II

Military tattoos, horse races, parades, and fireworks displays were mounted in Canada. The country's Governor General, Vincent Massey, proclaimed the day a national holiday and presided over celebrations on Parliament Hill in Ottawa, where the Queen's coronation speech was broadcast and her personal royal standard flown from the Peace Tower. Later, a public concert was held on Parliament Hill and the Governor General hosted a ball at Rideau Hall. In Newfoundland, 90,000 boxes of sweets were given to children, some having theirs delivered by Royal Canadian Air Force drops, and, in Quebec, 400,000 people turned out in Montreal, some 100,000 at Jeanne-Mance Park alone. A multicultural show was put on at Exhibition Place in Toronto, square dances and exhibitions took place in the Prairie provinces, and, in Vancouver, the Chinese community performed a public lion dance. On the Korean Peninsula, Canadian soldiers serving in the Korean War acknowledged the day by firing red, white, and blue coloured smoke shells at the enemy and drank rum rations.

A documentary film of the coronation, A Queen Is Crowned, narrated by Laurence Olivier, was one of the most popular films in British cinemas that year. It was nominated for the Academy Award for Best Documentary Feature and was the first winner of the Golden Globe Award for Best Documentary Film.

== Later events ==
=== Coronation Review of the Fleet ===
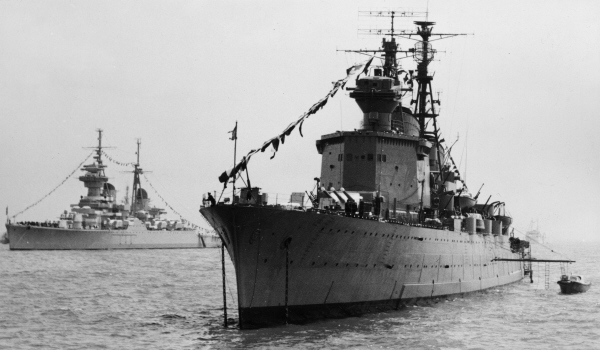
Warships from Sweden (right) and the Soviet Union (left) at the fleet review

On 15 June 1953, the Queen attended a fleet review at Spithead, off the coast at Portsmouth. Commanded by Admiral Sir George Creasy were 197 Royal Navy warships, together with 13 from the Commonwealth and 16 from foreign navies, as well as representative vessels from the British Merchant Navy and Fishing Fleets. There were more British and Commonwealth naval ships present than at the 1937 coronation review, though a third of them were frigates or smaller vessels. Major Royal Navy units included Britain's last battleship, HMS Vanguard, and four fleet and three light aircraft carriers. The Royal Australian Navy and the Royal Canadian Navy also each included a light carrier in their contingents, HMAS Sydney and HMCS Magnificent.

Using the frigate HMS Surprise as a royal yacht, the Queen and royal family started to review the lines of anchored ships at 3:30 p.m., finally anchoring at 5:10 p.m. This was followed by a fly-past of Fleet Air Arm aircraft. Forty naval air squadrons participated, with 327 aircraft flying from four naval air stations; the formation was led by Rear Admiral Walter Couchman flying a de Havilland Sea Vampire. After the Queen transferred to Vanguard for dinner, the day concluded with the Illumination of the fleet and a fireworks display.

=== Honours of Scotland ===
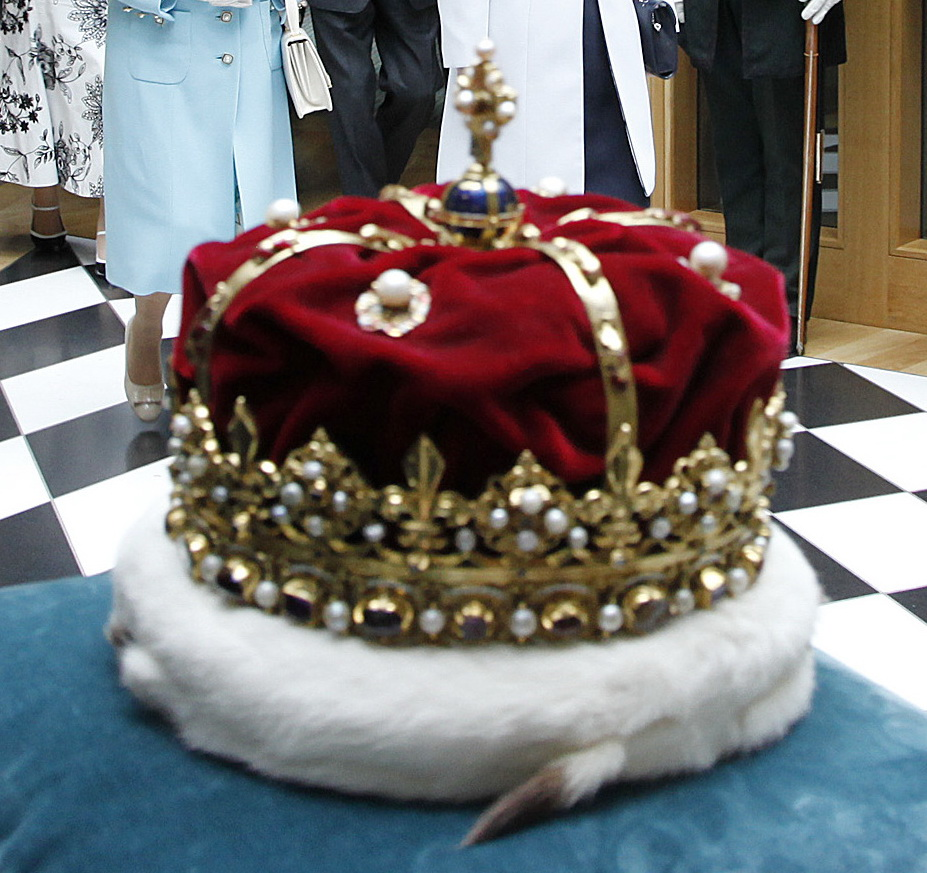
The Crown of Scotland

During a week-long visit to Scotland, on 24 June 1953, the Queen attended a national service of thanksgiving at St Giles' Cathedral, Edinburgh, during which she was ceremonially presented with the Honours of Scotland, the Scottish crown jewels. Following a carriage procession through the city escorted by the Royal Company of Archers, the service, led by the Moderator of the General Assembly of the Church of Scotland, James Pitt-Watson, was attended by a congregation of 1,700 drawn from all sections of Scottish society. The high point of the event was the presentation of the Honours, which the Queen received from the Dean of the Thistle, Charles Warr, and then passed the Crown of Scotland to the Duke of Hamilton, the Sword of State to the Earl of Home, and the Sceptre to the Earl of Crawford and Balcarres. It was the first time that this ceremony had been enacted since 1822 during the visit of King George IV.

The Queen was dressed in "day clothes" complete with a handbag, rather than in ceremonial robes, which was taken as a slight to Scotland's dignity by the Scottish press. The decision not to dress formally was made by the Private Secretary to the Sovereign, Sir Alan Lascelles, and Sir Austin Strutt, a senior civil servant at the Home Office, to avoid the service being interpreted as a coronation (the Kingdom of Scotland having ceased to exist upon the Acts of Union 1707). In the official painting of the ceremony by Stanley Cursiter, the offending handbag was tactfully omitted.

=== Coronation Review of the RAF ===
On 15 July 1953, the Queen attended a review of the Royal Air Force at RAF Odiham in Hampshire. The first part of the review was a march past by contingents representing the various commands of the RAF, with Bomber Command leading. This was followed by four de Havilland Venoms of the Central Fighter Establishment making the Royal Cypher in skywriting. After lunch, the Queen in an open car toured the lines of some 300 aircraft that were arranged in a static display. She returned to the central dias for the flypast of 640 British and Commonwealth aircraft, of which 440 were jet-powered. The flypast was led by a Bristol Sycamore helicopter which was towing a large RAF Ensign, while the final aircraft was a prototype Supermarine Swift flown by test pilot Mike Lithgow. Finally, the skywriting Venoms spelled out the word "vivat".

== See also ==
- List of participants in the coronation procession of Elizabeth II
- 1953 Coronation Honours
- The Queen's Beasts, heraldic statues placed outside Westminster Abbey representing Elizabeth's genealogy
- Canadian Coronation Contingent
- All the Elizabeths
- Coronation of Charles III and Camilla
