= Kra Isthmus railway =

Former railway line in Thailand (1943–1945)

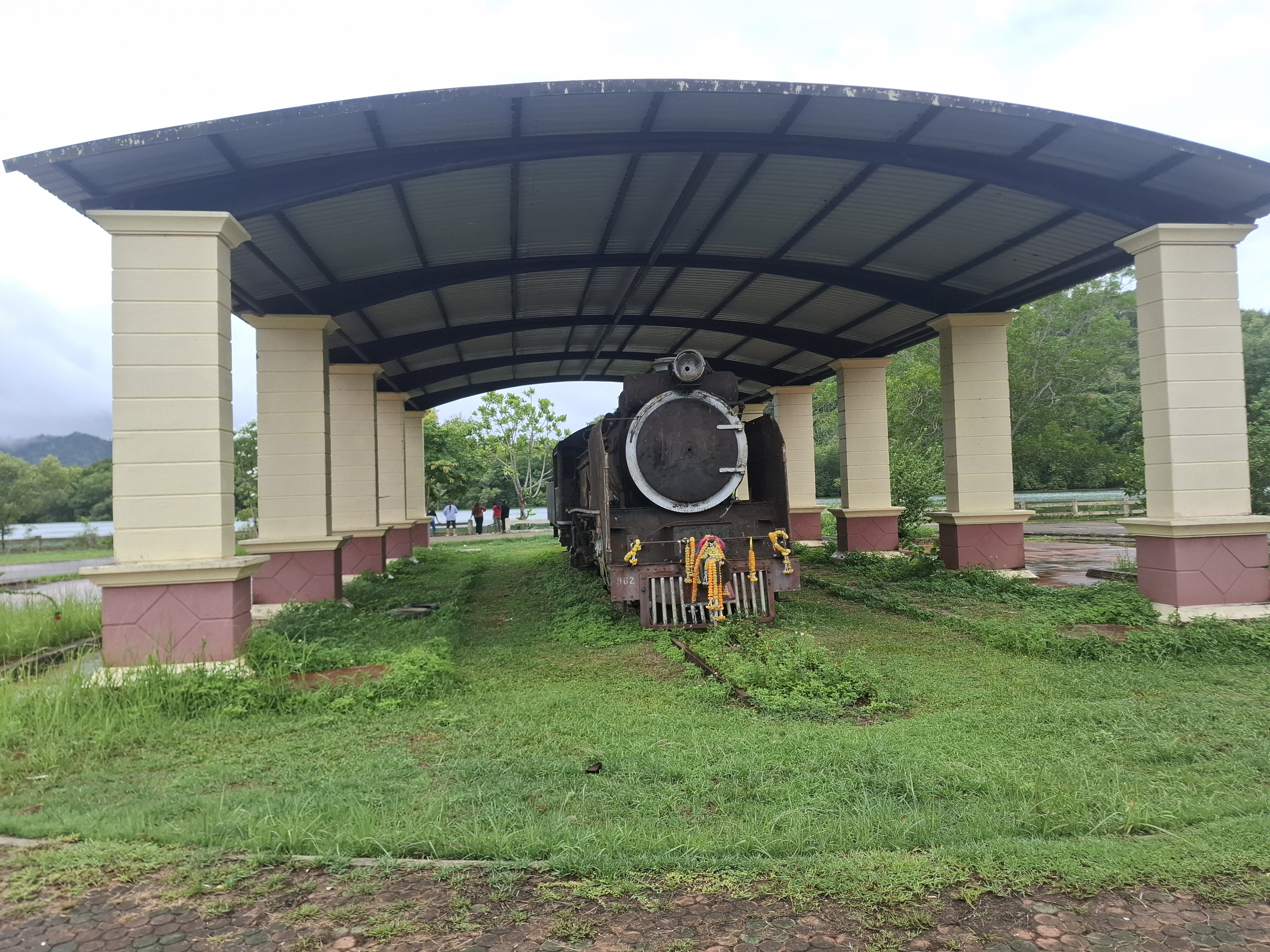
- Steam locomotive at former Khao Fa Chi Station

Overview
- Status: Partially abandoned
- Owner: Imperial Japan
- Termini: Chumphon, Thailand; Kra Buri, Thailand
- Stations: Chumphon railway station

Service
- Type: Military freight
- Depot(s): Khao Fa Chi Port

History
- Commenced: June 1943
- Completed: November 1943
- Closed: 19 March 1945

Technical
- Line length: 90 km (56 mi)
- Number of tracks: 1
- Track gauge: 4 ft 8 1/2 in (1,435 mm) standard gauge

The Kra Isthmus railway was a rail line constructed for Imperial Japan during World War II linking Chumphon to Kra Buri in Thailand. The railroad connected the Bangkok-Singapore Line westward to the west coast of the Kra Isthmus near Victoria Point (Kawthaung). Sir Andrew Gilchrist wrote a harrowing account of worker conditions. Malay and Tamil slave laborers were used and material moved from Kelantan. Allied bombing in 1945 ended the 11-month operation of the railroad and the Japanese switched their focus to the Thai-Burma Railway, also referred to as the Death Railway, for the large numbers of prisoners and effectively enslaved workers who died there. They moved equipment, track and personnel from the Kra Isthmus Railway to the Thai-Burma line.

The 90 km (56 mi) line connected with the Southern Line at Chumphon. Work began on the line in June 1943 and was completed in November. Equipment and personnel from Kelantan were used. The line was in operation for 11 months until U.S. bombing ceased operation. The line was then abandoned and scrapped for use on the Thai-Burma Railway. The line connected to Ban Khao Fa Chi on the La-Un River where boats could continue transport to Ranong and on to Victoria Point (Kawthaung).

== See also ==
- Burma Railway
