= Roderick Walker =

British SAS commander

Roderick "Rory" Muir Bamford Walker
- Born: 27 February 1932; Sutton Coldfield, England
- Died: 15 October 2008 (aged 76)
- Military career
- Allegiance: United Kingdom
- Branch: SAS
- Service years: 1952–
- Rank: Brigadier
- Nickname: Red Rory
- Service number: 420946

Brigadier Roderick "Rory" Muir Bamford Walker OBE MC (27 February 1932 – 15 October 2008) was a British SAS Commander, known for his involvement in the Oman Uprising and the Indonesian Confrontation.

== Early life and training ==
Walker was born 27 February 1932 in Sutton Coldfield and was educated at Cheltenham College and RMA Sandhurst

== Career ==
Walker was commissioned into the Sherwood Foresters in 1952, where he served for a short period before being transferred to the Intelligence Corps, from there he joined 22 Special Air Service Regiment as a Troop Commander. Early in his career he made his name as an Army Officers Boxing Champion and an expert parachutist.

=== The Oman Campaign ===
The kingdom of Muscat and Oman had been a British Protectorate since 1891 and by the 1950s was ruled by Sultan Said bin Taimur, who by the late 1950s was facing serious opposition and uprisings from the imam of Oman. Britain helped Taimur to suppress the imam's first revolt in 1955, however this caused resentment from Saudi Arabia and Egypt who then backed the imam's second revolt.

The iman's brother Talib recruited and trained a force of around 500 Omanis and started a second revolt in May 1957. British forces, at the Sultan's request, responded and suppressed the revolt, but the leaders fled to the Jebel Akhdar (The Green Mountain) and continued to launch intermittent attacks from their safe vantage point. Despite numerous attempts, and nervous about international attention, the British were unable to stop the attacks.

In November 1958, the British sent D Squadron 22 SAS under the command of Major John Watts from Malaysia to conduct a recce of the mountain. Watts was accompanied by his second in command, Captain Walker. On 27 December 1958, Walker gained a lodgment on the north side of the Jebel and climbed a rope which they had fixed to the rock face. Steadying himself in a cleft in the rock, Walker pulled the pin from a grenade and hurled it over the lip above him. It killed one of the enemy and scattered the rest. Walker and his men then reached the plateau and by dawn they had killed another eight. Walker was later awarded the Military Cross for his bravery.

By December, the RAF had conducted extensive counter-insurgency bombing operations in the region, quelling the revolt until 1966.

=== The Indonesian Confrontation ===
By the 1960s, Walker, by then a Major had been assigned to serve under Lieutenant Colonel Bill Becke as a member of the two-man Military Attaché at the British Embassy in Djakarta, Indonesia.

During his posting the Indonesia–Malaysia confrontation began, when Britain as part of the dismantling of the Empire in Southeast Asia, proposed to combine its colonies on Borneo with the Federation of Malaya to form a new country called Malaysia. The move was opposed by neighbouring country of Indonesia, who believed that it was a ploy to increase British control over the region and would eventually threaten their independence.

On 16 September 1963, an organised mob of several thousand demonstrators formed in the city of Djakarta, they sacked the Malaysian Embassy before marching on the British Embassy where Becke and Walker were on guard. The protesters tore down the Union Jack and burnt the Ambassadors car, then threw stones and pieces of concrete through the fence breaking all the embassy windows. In what is now a legendary act, Walker strode up and down in front of the building, dodging the missiles and relentlessly playing his bagpipes despite pleas from the police and the leader of the demonstrators, eventually the mob broke up and the battle was won.

Two days later however the mob returned and broke through the fence besieging the building and eventually setting it on fire, Becke, Walker and the Ambassador Sir Andrew Gilchrist took a stand on British sovereign soil and defended the embassy strong room.

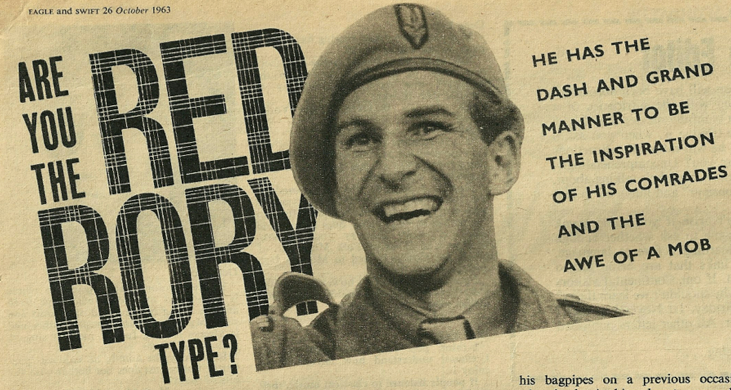
Major Walker after the siege

=== Later career ===
Walker later went on to command 23 SAS (TAVR) a service involving him in training potential "stay-behind" parties in northwest Europe in the event of a Warsaw Pact attack. He was appointed OBE on conclusion of his command. He returned to intelligence work and after promotion to brigadier became a deputy commander of a military district in England, before being promoted to Security Chief for the Army North of the Border, during this time he was convinced that Soviet Union Spetznaz operatives had carried out detailed reconnaissance of targets in Scotland in the guise of long-distance drivers.

== Death ==
Brigadier Walker died peacefully on 15 October 2008 at the age of 76 after a long illness. His funeral took place at Dunning Parish Church on 26 October 2008.
