= Coronation Arches =

Arches over The Mall for the Coronation of Elizabeth II

Coordinates: 51.5057°N 0.1311°W

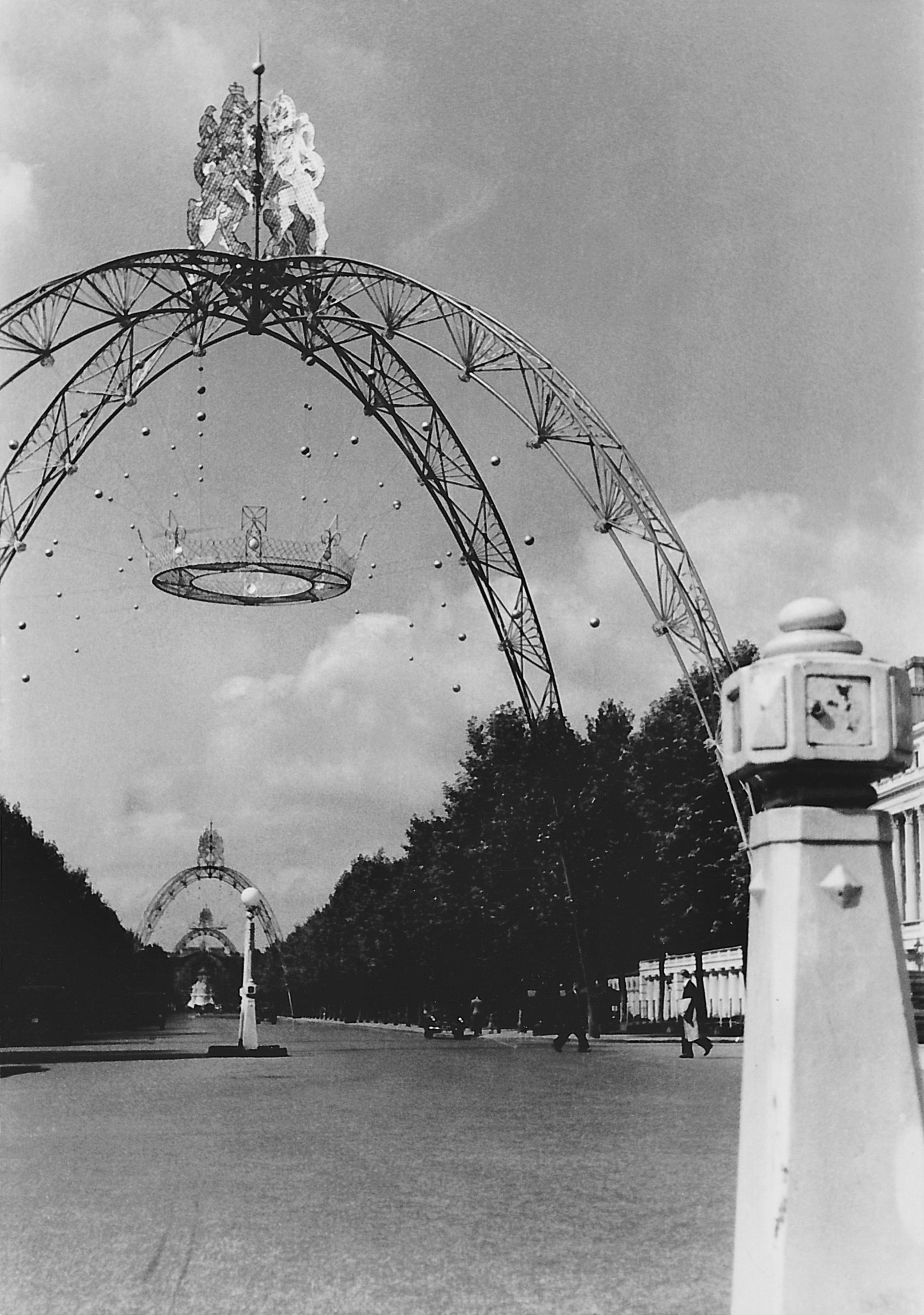
The Coronation Arches along the Mall

The Coronation Arches were a series of four steel arches erected over The Mall, London, for the Coronation of Queen Elizabeth II in 1953.

The arches were designed by Eric Bedford. The tubular steel arches were floodlit and were adorned with metalwork crowns and golden cane fan-shaped designs. Sources describe them as being 70 or 85 feet (21 or 26 m) in height.

In a House of Commons debate on 3 December 1953, Minister of Works Sir David Eccles announced that he was considering the arches' fate, and that they may be used in the rebuilding of the Palm House, Kew Gardens at the Royal Botanic Gardens. It was later decided that renovation was preferable to rebuilding, and this option was rejected.
