= Eric Bedford (architect) =

British architect (1909–2001)

Eric Bedford CB CVO
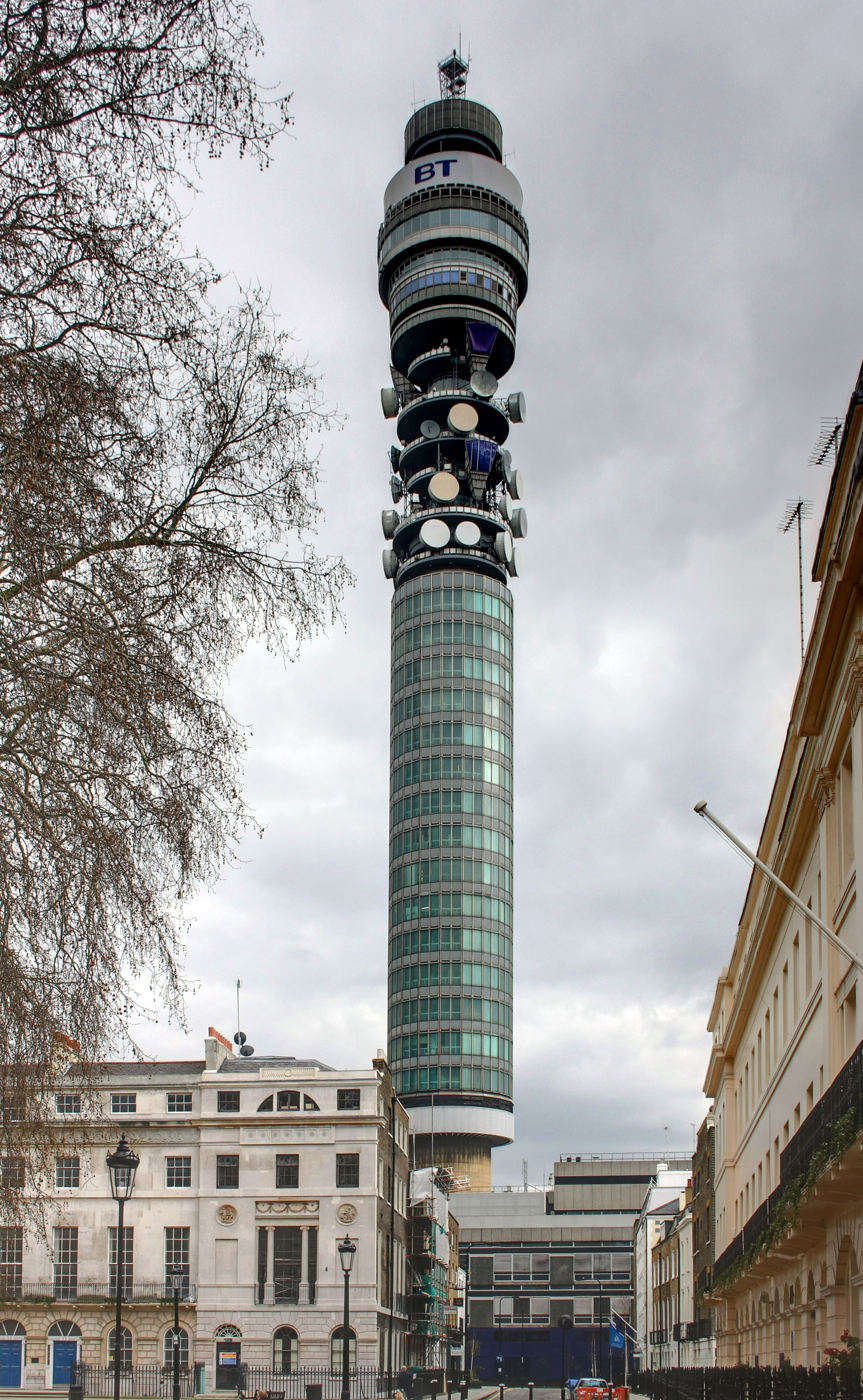
- Lector si monumentum requiris circumspice
- Born: 8 November 1909; Halifax, West Riding of Yorkshire, England
- Died: 28 July 2001 (aged 91); Worcester, England
- Education: Thornton Grammar School
- Occupation: Architect
- Buildings: BT Tower

Eric Bedford CB CVO (8 November 1909 – 28 July 2001) was a twentieth-century British architect whose most famous work is London's BT Tower. In 1961, construction began on what was then known as the Post Office Tower, with Bedford as Chief Architect and G R Yeats as senior architect in charge. Completed in 1965, with a height of 177 metres (581 ft), it became for a time London's tallest building.

Born in Yorkshire, and trained as an architect in the Midlands, Bedford joined the Ministry of Public Building and Works in 1936. In 1951, he was appointed the Ministry's youngest-ever Chief Architect. Shortly afterward, he had an important role in the design of the Coronation of Queen Elizabeth II, for which he was subsequently made a Commander of the Royal Victorian Order.

Bedford retired in 1970, and lived abroad for some years before dying in 2001. Although he was the architect responsible for one of London's most iconic buildings, he achieved surprisingly little recognition in his lifetime, or afterward; his obituary in The New York Times described him as "the British government's anonymous chief architect, whose works were visible to millions but whose name was scarcely known".

== Life ==
Bedford was born on 29 August 1909 near Halifax in Yorkshire. He was educated at Thornton Grammar School and then undertook an architectural apprenticeship in Leicester. In 1934 he won a RIBA medal for his design for a railway terminal. Two years later he joined the Ministry of Public Building and Works, and, after the Second World War, was appointed its youngest-ever Chief Architect. At the Coronation of Queen Elizabeth II, Bedford had responsibility for significant elements of the overall design, including the Coronation Arches.

Given its importance to government communications, the BT Tower was designed to withstand nuclear attack, and in 1971 it was relatively undamaged by a bomb placed in the tower's revolving restaurant by the Angry Brigade. Bedford's comment was recorded as; "I made it to last, bombers or not". In addition to the tower, he oversaw or undertook a number of other important governmental commissions – both within the UK, including the departmental buildings on Marsham Street, Westminster, and offices for MPs within the Palace of Westminster; and overseas, including embassy buildings in Warsaw, Washington, D.C. and Jakarta.

After retiring to France to be near his daughter, Bedford returned to England following the death of his wife in 1977. He lived for many years in the village of Hanley Swan near Malvern, Worcestershire, and died in a nursing home in Worcester in 2001.

== Honours ==
Bedford was appointed Commander of the Royal Victorian Order (CVO) in the 1953 Coronation Honours, and Companion of the Order of the Bath (CB) in the 1959 Birthday Honours.

== Works ==
- Administrative offices of the Embassy of the United Kingdom, Washington, D.C., 1960s.
- Marsham Street, government offices, 1963–1971. Pevsner considers Bedford's work at Marsham Street "ruthlessly logical" but a "spectacular failure, the very image of faceless bureaucracy".
- St James's Park, footbridge, 1956–1957. The slightly back-handed compliment in Pevsner is: "quite handsome, and good to look out from", but the authors consider the Victorian cast-iron suspension bridge it replaced "a great loss".
- Embassy of the United Kingdom, Jakarta, 1962. The embassy was subject to anti-British demonstrations throughout its existence, and the site was vacated in 2015.
- British High Commission, Ottawa, 1964.
- BT Tower, 1961–1965. Pevsner describes it as "a notable 1960s landmark".
- Office accommodation, Star Chamber Court, Palace of Westminster. Pevsner's single comment is "ugly".

== Sources ==
- Aslet, Clive (2005). Landmarks of Britain. London: Hodder & Stoughton. ISBN 978-0-340-73510-7. "editions:O60YB-B7LYMC."
- Bradley, Simon; Pevsner, Nikolaus (2003). London 6: Westminster. The Buildings of England. Yale University Press. ISBN 0-300-09595-3.
- Cherry, Bridget; Pevsner, Nikolaus (2002). London 4: North. The Buildings of England. Yale University Press. ISBN 0-300-09653-4.
