= Matthew Jones (historian) =

Matthew Charles Jones is professor of international history at the London School of Economics. Jones is a specialist in British foreign and defence policy since the Second World War, British decolonization and South East Asia, the Vietnam War, nuclear history during the Cold War, American foreign relations since 1941 and Anglo-American relations.

Jones completed his undergraduate studies at the University of Sussex, and later received a DPhil in modern history from St Antony's College, Oxford. Since 2008, Jones has been the British Cabinet Office official historian of the UK strategic nuclear deterrent and the Chevaline programme.

== Bibliography ==
=== Books ===
- Britain, the United States and the Mediterranean War, 1942-44. Macmillan, London, 1996.
- Conflict and Confrontation in South East Asia, 1961-1965: Britain, the United States, Indonesia, and the Creation of Malaysia. Cambridge University Press, Cambridge, 2002.
- After Hiroshima: The United States, Race, and Nuclear Weapons in Asia, 1945-1965. Cambridge University Press, Cambridge, 2010.
- The official history of the UK strategic nuclear deterrent : volume I - from the V-Bomber era to the arrival of Polaris, 1945-1964. London: Routledge. 2017.
- The official history of the UK strategic nuclear deterrent : volume II - the Labour Government and the Polaris Programme, 1964-1970. London: Routledge. 2017.

=== Critical studies and reviews of Jones' work ===
The official history of the UK strategic nuclear deterrent

- Greenberg, Myron A. (Summer 2018). "[Untitled book review]". Book Reviews. Naval War College Review. 71 (3): 155–156.
