= Embassy of the United Kingdom, Jakarta =

British Embassy, Jakarta
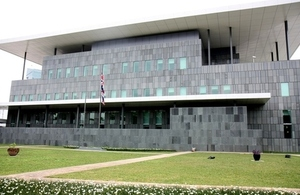
- The Embassy building in Jakarta
- Location: Jakarta, Indonesia
- Address: Jl. Patra Kuningan Raya Blok L5-6, Jakarta 12950, Indonesia
- Coordinates: 6.2307739°S 106.83444569999999°E
- Ambassador: Dominic Jermey
- Website: British Embassy, Jakarta

The Embassy of the United Kingdom in Jakarta is the chief diplomatic mission of the United Kingdom in Indonesia. The British Ambassador to Indonesia also serves as the non-resident Ambassador to Timor-Leste and also as British representative to ASEAN.

== History ==
The original embassy was built in 1962, to the designs of Eric Bedford, Chief Architect at the Ministry of Public Building and Works. It was ransacked on 16 September 1963 when anti-British sentiment led to attacks on both the British and Malaysian Embassies. During the attack, the assistant military attache Roderick Walker played bagpipes as a sign of defiance against the mob attack.

The old Embassy building on Jl. MH Thamrin in Central Jakarta, had increasingly become the target of protesters. In 2004, the Islam Defenders Front (FPI) knocked down the building's gate and pelted it with rotten eggs. The British government installed roadblocks at its two main access points, a move that was met with contempt from local residents. As a result of security issues the UK decided to seek a more suitable building.

The Embassy moved to its current location on Jl. Patra Kuningan Raya, South Jakarta in 2013 and was officially opened by Prince Andrew, Duke of York. It sits in grounds behind a secure gatehouse.

Dominic Jermey became ambassador in 2023 and in 2025 the new deputy was identified as Fiona Ritchie.

== Other locations ==
Outside Jakarta, there is also a British Honorary Consulate in Bali providing limited consular assistance.

== See also ==
- Indonesia–United Kingdom relations
- List of diplomatic missions in Indonesia
- List of Ambassadors of the United Kingdom to Indonesia
