= 1996 Birthday Honours =

British government recognitions

Queen's Birthday Honours are announced on or around the date of the Queen's Official Birthday in Australia, Canada, New Zealand and the United Kingdom. The dates vary, both from year to year and from country to country. All are published in supplements to the London Gazette and many are conferred by the monarch (or her representative) some time after the date of the announcement, particularly for those service people on active duty.

The 1996 Queen's Birthday honours list for the United Kingdom and Commonwealth was announced on 14 June 1996; the list for Australia announced on 9 June 1996; and the list for New Zealand announced on 3 June 1996.

Recipients of honours are shown below as they were styled before their new honour.

== United Kingdom ==
=== Life Peers ===
==== Baroness ====
- Dame June Kathleen Lloyd, D.B.E., Nuffield Professor of Child Health, British Postgraduate Medical Federation, London University, 1985–1992; now Emeritus Professor.

==== Barons ====
- Marmaduke James Hussey, lately chairman, Board of Governors, BBC.
- Field Marshal Sir Richard Frederick Vincent, G.B.E., K.C.B., D.S.O., lately Chairman of the Military Committee, NATO.

=== Privy Counsellors ===
- James Gordon Brown, M.P., Member of Parliament for Dunfermline East.
- Robin Finlayson Cook, M.P., Member of Parliament for Livingston.
- David Maurice Curry, M.P., Member of Parliament for Skipton and Ripon and Minister of State, Department of the Environment.
- Donald Campbell Dewar, M.P., Member of Parliament for Glasgow Garscadden.
- Don Dixon, M.P., Member of Parliament for Jarrow.
- Lord James Alexander Douglas-Hamilton, M.P., Member of Parliament for Edinburgh West and Minister of State, Scottish Office.
- John Jackson, Baron MacKay of Ardbrecknish, Minister of State, Department of Social Security.
- Sir Geoffrey Johnson Smith, D.L., M.P., Member of Parliament for Wealden and Vice Chairman of the 1922 Committee.

=== Knights Bachelor ===
- Philip Martin Bailhache, Bailiff of Jersey. For services to the community in Jersey.
- James David Francis Barnes, C.B.E., chief executive officer, Zeneca Group plc. For services to the Pharmaceuticals Industry.
- Professor Michael Victor Berry, F.R.S., Royal Society Research Professor, University of Bristol. For services to Physics.
- William Brown, C.B.E., lately chairman, Scottish Arts Council and of Scottish Television. For services to the Arts and to Broadcasting.
- Leonard John Chalstrey, Lord Mayor of London. For services to the City of London.
- John Anthony Craven, chairman, Morgan Grenfell Group plc. For services to Banking and to the city.
- Richard Harry Evans, C.B.E., Chief Executive, British Aerospace plc. For services to the Aerospace and Defence Industries.
- Harry Fang Sin-yang, C.B.E., J.P. For services to orthopaedic and rehabilitative medicine in Hong Kong.
- Professor David Paul Brandes Goldberg, Director of Research and Development, Institute of Psychiatry. For services to Medicine.
- James Hann, C.B.E. For services to Industry in Scotland.
- Robert Hicks, M.P., Member of Parliament for Cornwall South-East. For political service.
- Stanley James Allen Hill, M.P., Member of Parliament for Southampton Test. For political service.
- Jeremy Isaacs, General Director, Royal Opera House. For services to Broadcasting and to the Arts.
- Elgar Spencer Jenkins, O.B.E. For political and public service.
- David Robert Corbett Kelly, C.B.E. For political and public service.
- William Herbert Laming, C.B.E., Chief Inspector, Social Services Inspectorate, Department of Health. For services to the Social Services.
- George Henry Martin, C.B.E., chairman, Air Studios. For services to the Recording Industry.
- Brian Scott Moffat, O.B.E., chairman and Chief Executive, British Steel plc. For services to the Steel Industry.
- Professor Peter John Morris, F.R.S., Nuffield Professor of Surgery, Chairman of Surgery and Director, Oxford Transplantation Centre, University of Oxford. For services to Medicine.
- Professor James Duncan Dunbar-Nasmith, C.B.E. For services to Architecture.
- Raymond Powell, M.P. For services to the House of Commons.
- Anthony Nigel Russell Rudd, chairman, Williams Holdings plc. For services to the Manufacturing Industry.
- James Sharples, Q.P.M., Chief Constable, Merseyside Police. For services to the Police.
- Roger Edward Sims, M.P., Member of Parliament for Chislehurst. For political service.
- John James Skehel, F.R.S., Director, National Institute for Medical Research. For services to Science.
- Professor Trevor Arthur Smith. For services to Higher Education.
- Clive Malcolm Thompson, Group Chief Executive, Rentokil Group plc. For services to Industry.
- Alexander Trotman. For services to British-American commercial relations.
- His Honour Stephen Tumim, lately H.M. Chief Inspector of Prisons in England and Wales.
- Rodney Myerscough Walker, chairman, the Sports Council. For services to Sport.

=== Order of the Bath ===
==== Knight Commander of the Order of the Bath (KCB) ====
- Air Marshal David Cousins, C.B., A.F.C., Royal Air Force.
- Graham Allan Hart, C.B., Permanent Secretary, Department of Health.
- Lieutenant General Robert John Hayman-Joyce, C.B.E., late Royal Hussars.
- William Kennedy Reid, C.B., Parliamentary Commissioner for Administration and Health Service Commissioner for England, Scotland and Wales.
- Vice Admiral Jonathan James Richard Tod, C.B.E.

==== Companion of the Order of the Bath (CB) ====
Military Division

- Rear Admiral John Patrick Clarke, L.V.O., M.B.E.
- Major General Philip James Gladstone Corp, late Corps of Royal Electrical and Mechanical Engineers.
- Major General Alasdair Ian Gordon Kennedy, C.B.E., late The Gordon Highlanders.
- Major General Michael Dalrymple Regan, O.B.E., late The Light Infantry.
- Air Vice-Marshal Nigel Bruce Baldwin, C.B.E., Royal Air Force.
- Air Vice-Marshal John Bartram Main, O.B.E., Royal Air Force (Retired).

Civil Division

- Kenneth Richard Ashken, lately Grade 3, Crown Prosecution Service.
- Christopher John Andrew Barnes, lately Grade 3, Ministry of Agriculture, Fisheries and Food.
- Valerie June, Mrs Bayliss, lately Grade 3, Department for Education and Employment.
- John Frederick Brindley, Grade 3, Lord Chancellor's Department.
- Robert Charles Dobbie, Grade 3, Office of Public Service.
- John Albert Gulvin, Grade 3, Ministry of Defence.
- Anthony John Langford, Chief Executive, Valuation Office Agency, H.M. Board of Inland Revenue.
- David Henry Loades, Grade 3, Government Actuary's Department.
- Thomas Richard Harman Luce, Head of Social Care Policy, Department of Health.
- Kenneth John MacKenzie, Grade 2, Scottish Office.
- Miss Eileen Alison Mackay (Mrs Russell), lately Grade 3, Scottish Office.
- Marilynne Ann, Mrs Morgan, Solicitor and Legal Adviser, Department of the Environment.
- Sydney George Norris, Grade 3, Home Office.
- Miss Margaret Ellen Peirson, Grade 3, Department of Social Security.
- Alexander William Russell, deputy chairman, H.M. Board of Customs and Excise.
- George Warren Staple, Director of the Serious Fraud Office.
- Andrew Donald Whetnall, Grade 3, Cabinet Office.
- William Brian Willott, Chief Executive, Export Credits Guarantee Department.

=== Order of St Michael and St George ===
==== Knight Grand Cross of the Order of St Michael and St George (GCMG) ====
- Sir Christopher Leslie George Mallaby, G.C.V.O., K.C.M.G., H.M. Ambassador, Paris.

==== Knight Commander of the Order of St Michael and St George (KCMG) ====
- Michael Douglas McWilliam, Director, School of Oriental and African Studies, London University. For services to Higher Education.
- David Rolland Spedding, C.V.O., O.B.E., Chief of Secret Intelligence Service.
- John Stephen Wall, C.M.G., L.V.O., UK Permanent Representative to the European Union, Brussels.
- David John Wright, C.M.G., L.V.O., H.M. Ambassador, Tokyo.

==== Companion of the Order of St Michael and St George (CMG) ====
- Merrick Stuart Baker-Bates, H.M. Consul-General, Los Angeles.
- Bishop Bernard Patrick Devlin. For services to the community in Gibraltar.
- Gordon Aldridge Duggan, High Commissioner, Singapore.
- Richard George Hopper Fletcher, Foreign and Commonwealth Office.
- Ian Duncan Hendry, Foreign and Commonwealth Office.
- James William Hodge, Minister, H.M. Embassy, Peking.
- David Christopher Kelly, Deputy Chief Scientific Officer, Ministry of Defence.
- Neil Maidment. For services to British commercial interests in Hong Kong and China.
- Francis Joseph Savage, L.V.O., O.B.E., Governor, Montserrat.
- Peter Graham Wilmott, lately Director General (Customs and Indirect Taxation), Commission of the European Union.

=== Royal Victorian Order ===
==== Knight Grand Cross of the Royal Victorian Order (GCVO) ====
- Major Sir Shane Gabriel Basil Blewitt, K.C.V.O., Keeper of the Privy Purse and Treasurer to The Queen.
- The Right Honourable Sir Robert Fellowes, K.C.B., K.C.V.O., Private Secretary to The Queen.

==== Knight Commander of the Royal Victorian Order (KCVO) ====
- The Very Reverend Thomas Eric Evans, Dean of St Paul's Cathedral.
- James Hugh Neill, C.B.E., T.D., lately Lord Lieutenant of South Yorkshire.

==== Commander of the Royal Victorian Order (CVO) ====
- Charles Vernon Anson, L.V.O., Press Secretary to The Queen.
- James Gerald Gulliver, lately Trustee, The Duke of Edinburgh's Award Scheme.
- Robert Matthew Morris, lately Assistant Under-Secretary of State, Criminal Justice and Constitutional Department, Home Office.
- Kenneth William Parsons, L.V.O., lately Surveyor of the Lands for the South Survey, Duchy of Lancaster.
- Thomas Andrew Shebbeare, executive director, The Prince's Trusts.

==== Lieutenant of the Royal Victorian Order (LVO) ====
- Richard Winston Arbiter, Director of Media Affairs, Royal Collection.
- Major Nicholas Michael Lancelot Barne, Private Secretary to Princess Alice, Duchess of Gloucester and The Duke and Duchess of Gloucester.
- Commander Hugh Blyth Daglish, Royal Navy. Her Majesty's Yacht Britannia.
- Cecil William Lavery Graham, O.B.E., lately vice-chairman of the Board, The Prince's Trust.
- Katharine Joan, Mrs Harvey, Lady in Waiting to Princess Alice, Duchess of Gloucester.
- Commander Jonathan Mortimer Collingwood Maughan, Royal Navy. Lately of Her Majesty's Yacht Britannia.
- Miss Jane Katharine Walker-Okeover, Extra Woman of the Bedchamber to Queen Elizabeth The Queen Mother.
- Ian Richard Parsons, Surveyor of Lands for the Lancashire and Crewe Surveys, Duchy of Lancaster.
- Harold Geoffrey Roberts, lately Director of Information, Welsh Office.
- Thomas Woodcock, Somerset Herald, College of Arms.

==== Member of the Royal Victorian Order (MVO) ====
- Kathleen Elizabeth, Mrs Brown. For services to The Crown in Canada.
- Major Colin Neville Burgess, lately Temporary Equerry to Queen Elizabeth The Queen Mother.
- Miss Wendy Dorothea Button, Personal Assistant (Auxiliary) to the Governor-General of Australia.
- Miss Maria Cicutto. For services to The Crown in Australia.
- Miss Sandra Evelyn Cochrane, Personal Assistant to the Governor-General of Australia.
- Sergeant Brian Edward Ford, Royalty and Diplomatic Protection Department, Metropolitan Police.
- Sergeant Jeffrey Alan Fuller, Royalty and Diplomatic Protection Department, Metropolitan Police.
- Daniel Neil Glasser. For services to The Crown in Australia.
- Miss Jean Catherine Gray, Secretary, Household of The Princess Margaret, Countess of Snowdon.
- Bernard Rushmer Jones, lately chairman of the Board of The Prince's Youth Business Trust.
- Edwin Alfred Andrew Norton, Maintenance Manager, Windsor Castle.
- Major Albert Victor Smith, M.B.E., Superintendent of the Royal Mews, Buckingham Palace.
- Terence Hector Summers, Partner, Smith-Woolley.
- Patricia, Mrs Wilde, Assistant to the Lieutenancy of Hereford and Worcester.
- Brian Wilson, lately Head Forester, Duchy of Cornwall.

=== Royal Victorian Medal (RVM) ===
==== Royal Victorian Medal (Gold) ====
- Leslie Robert Simmons, R.V.M., lately Agricultural Worker, Sandringham Estate.

==== Bar to the Royal Victorian Medal (Silver) ====
- Leslie Frank Cribbett, R.V.M., lately Member of the Princetown Works Department, Duchy of Cornwall, Dartmoor.
- Roy Thomas William Howling, R.V.M., Farm Foreman, Sandringham Estate.

==== Royal Victorian Medal (Silver) ====
- John Alan Brown, Agricultural Worker, Sandringham Estate.
- Philip Shaun Croasdale, Palace Steward, Buckingham Palace.
- Edward Esson, Farm Grieve, Balmoral Estate.
- David Albert Griffin, Head Chauffeur, Buckingham Palace.
- Keith Howard Griffiths, Senior Dining Room Assistant, Buckingham Palace.
- Leading Seaman (Missile) Paul Andrew Hale, Her Majesty's Yacht Britannia.
- Sergeant Major John Glyn Hook,[The Queen's Body Guard of the Yeomen of the Guard.
- Acting Charge Chief Marine Engineering Artificer John Gordon Mace. Her Majesty's Yacht Britannia.
- Local Acting Chief Petty Officer Communications Yeoman Christopher Ian Plows. Her Majesty's Yacht Britannia.
- James Charles Edward Rough, Electrician, Buckingham Palace.
- Dennis Harold Tadd. Standsman, Members' Enclosure, Ascot Racecourse.
- Dennis Wilkinson, lately Messenger Sergeant Major, The Queen's Body Guard of the Yeomen of the Guard.
- James Douglas Winn, Parks Worker, The Crown Estate, Windsor.
- Divisional Sergeant Major Ernest James Woodman, M.B.E., The Queen's Body Guard of the Yeomen of the Guard.

=== Companion of Honour (CH) ===
- The Right Honourable Richard Edward Geoffrey, Baron Howe of Aberavon, Q.C. For political service.

=== Order of the British Empire ===
==== Dame Commander of the Order of the British Empire (DBE) ====
- Fiona, Mrs Caldicott, Chairman, the Academy of Medical Royal Colleges and President, the Royal College of Psychiatrists. For services to Medicine.
- Felicity Ann Emwhyla Lott, C.B.E. For services to Opera.
- Sheila Valerie Masters, Partner, KPMG. For services to the Financial Industry.

==== Knight Commander of the Order of the British Empire (KBE) ====
- Lieutenant General Alexander George Hamilton Harley, C.B., O.B.E. (471272), late Royal Regiment of Artillery.

==== Commander of the Order of the British Empire (CBE) ====
Military Division

- Captain Peter Roland Davies, M.B.E., Royal Navy.
- Commodore Alan Duncan Ferguson, Royal Navy.
- Captain Richard Somerton Wraith, Royal Navy.
- Colonel Ian Charles Irvine, T.D., late The Parachute Regiment, Territorial Army.
- Brigadier (Acting Major General) Kevin O'Donoghue, late Corps of Royal Engineers.
- Brigadier Anthony John Raper, M.B.E., late Royal Corps of Signals.
- Air Commodore Peter Clarence Ayee, Royal Air Force.
- Group Captain Christopher Granville-White, Royal Air Force.

Civil Division

- Mary Margaret Anderson, Consultant Obstetrician and Gynaecologist, Lewisham Hospital. For services to Medicine.
- John Alexander Armitt, Chief Executive, Union Railways Ltd. For services to the Railway Industry.
- Geoffrey Armstrong, Director-General, Institute of Personnel and Development. For services to Industrial Relations.
- John Lionel Beckwith, Vice President, Royal National Institute for the Blind and Patron, Teenage Cancer Trust. For charitable services.
- Robert Beresford, Group Chairman, Mott MacDonald Group Ltd. For services to Engineering and to Export.
- Professor Alexander Boksenberg, F.R.S., lately, Director, the Royal Observatories. For services to Astronomy.
- Trevor Courtnay Bonner, managing director, GKN Automotive and Agritechnical Products, GKN plc. For services to the Automotive Components Industry.
- Christopher William Brasher, Life President, London Marathon and Vice President, British Orienteering Federation. For services to Sport.
- Beata Ann Brookes. For political service.
- Ewan Brown, Director, Noble Grossart. For services to Banking and to Public Life in Scotland.
- Richard St John Vladimir Burton. For services to Architecture.
- Professor Donald Carruthers, lately Director of Roads, Strathclyde Regional Council. For services to Local Government.
- Professor Peter John Bell Clarricoats, F.R.S., Head, Department of Electronic Engineering, Queen Mary and Westfield College. For services to the Ministry of Defence.
- Colonel John Alistair Clemence, T.D., lately Regimental Colonel, London Scottish Regiment, Territorial Army. For services to the Territorial Army.
- Julia Charity Cleverdon (Mrs Garnett), Chief Executive, Business in the Community. For services to Training and to Equal Opportunities.
- Tim William George Collins. For political service.
- Patrick Laurence Combes, lately Professional and Technology Director Grade A, Ministry of Defence.
- Peter John Cook, Director, British Geological Survey. For scientific services to industry.
- Allan Gerald Corless, lately Chief Executive, West Glamorgan County Council. For services to Local Government.
- Dan Crompton, Q.P.M., Her Majesty's Inspector of Constabulary. For services to the Police.
- Derek Lewis Davies. For services to Business and to the community in North West England.
- Miss Edna Nansi Margaret Davies, lately Grade 5, Welsh Office.
- Michael Shillito Trevelyan Dower, lately Director General, Countryside Commission. For services to Conservation and Countryside Recreation.
- Archibald Hugh Duberly DL, lately National President, Country Landowners' Association. For services to the Rural Community.
- Professor Evelyn Algernon Valentine Ebsworth, Vice Chancellor and Warden, University of Durham. For services to Higher Education.
- Professor Andrew Elkington, President, Royal College of Ophthalmologists. For services to Medicine.
- The Reverend Donald English. For services to World Methodism.
- Alun Evans, O.B.E., chairman, British Wool Marketing Board and chairman, Welsh Food Promotions. For services to Agriculture.
- Professor Lawrence David Freedman, Professor of War Studies, King's College, London. For services to Defence Studies.
- Christopher Michael Gable, artistic director, Northern Ballet Theatre. For services to Dance.
- Paul Gallagher, lately Health and Safety Commissioner. For services to Health and Safety.
- Jack Gee, lately Grade 5, Department of the Environment.
- Arthur Benjamin Norman Gill, Deputy President, National Farmers' Union. For services to Agriculture.
- Harvey Anthony Goldsmith, Chief Executive, The Allied Entertainment Group. For services to Entertainment.
- Brian James Hanson. For political service.
- Professor Frank Harris, Dean and Professor of Paediatrics. University of Leicester Medical School. For services to Medicine.
- Gary Leon Hewitt, Chief of Manufacturing, Atomic Weapons Establishment. For services to the Defence Industry.
- John William Hougham, chairman, Advisory, Conciliation and Arbitration Service. For service to Industrial Relations.
- Professor Judith Ann Kathleen Howard, Foundation Professor to Structural and Materials Chemistry, University of Durham. For services to Science.
- Leslie Howell, chairman, Merseyside Training and Enterprise Council. For services to Training.
- Terence Hunt. National Director, NHS Supplies Authority. For services to the NHS.
- Professor Ian Isherwood. For services to Radiology.
- Professor Kenneth James Ives, Emeritus Professor of Civil and Environmental Engineering, University College, London. For services to the Environment.
- David Lewis Jacobs, D.L. For services to Broadcasting and for charitable services.
- James Alexander Mercer Kerr. For public service.
- James Anthony King, Grade 5, Ministry of Defence.
- Ralph Richard Land, O.B.E. For services to Export to Eastern Europe.
- Professor Donald Frederick Leach, Principal, Queen Margaret College, Edinburgh. For services to Education.
- James Clarke Macfarlane, O.B.E., chairman, Tayside Health Board. For services to the NHS in Scotland.
- John Edward Maguire. For services to Industrial Tribunals.
- Alfred David Malpas, managing director, Tesco plc. For services to the Food Retail Industry.
- Robert John Margetts, executive director, ICI Group. For services to the Chemical and Engineering Industries.
- Douglas Keith Matthews, Deputy Controller, H.M. Board of Inland Revenue.
- William Thomas McCarter. For services to Industry.
- Michael William McCrum. For services to Education and to the Cathedrals Fabric Commission.
- Cameron McLatchie, O.B.E., chairman and Chief Executive, British Polythene Industries plc. For services to the Polythene Industry.
- Michael Rodney Newton Moore. For services to the National Society for the Prevention of Cruelty to Children.
- Annette, Mrs Noskwith, O.B.E. For political and public service.
- James Geoffrey Parker, chairman, Teacher Training Agency. For services to Education.
- John Alan Parkes, lately Chief Executive, Humberside County Council. For services to Local Government.
- Simon Frank Perry, Chief Executive, British Screen Finance. For services to the Film Industry.
- Professor Deanna Sheila Petherbridge, Professor of Drawing, Royal College of Art. For services to the Draughtsmanship.
- Professor James Colquhoun Petrie, Professor of Pharmacology and Head, Department of Medicine and Therapeutics, University of Aberdeen and co-director, Health Services Research Unit, Aberdeen. For services to Medicine.
- Rosina May, Mrs Pink. For political and public service.
- David Ernest Plowright, deputy chairman, Channel 4. For services to the Broadcasting Industry.
- Donald Andrew Porter. For political service.
- Roger Allan Pratt. For political service.
- Arthur Leolin Price, Q.C. For services to the Institute of Child Health.
- David Brookhouse Price, lately Grade 4, Department for Education and Employment.
- David Henry Probert, chairman, Crown Agents for Overseas Governments and Administrations. For services to Business.
- Brian Quinn, lately Director, Bank of England. For services to Banking.
- Roy Henry Ranson, managing director and Actuary, Equitable Life Assurance Society. For services to the Insurance Industry.
- Miss Marjorie Ethel Reeves, Honorary Fellow, St Anne's and St Hugh's Colleges, Oxford. For services to History.
- Ruth Barbara, Mrs Rendell, Novelist. For services to Literature.
- Norman Richardson, Vice President, Northumbria Tourist Board. For services to Tourism.
- George Francis Robertson, President, Rent Assessment Panel for Scotland. For services to the Community.
- Brian Gordon Robinson, Q.F.S.M., Chief Fire Officer and Chief Executive, London Fire and Civil Defence Authority. For services to the Fire Service.
- Hedley Stephen Salt. For services to Barnsley Metropolitan Borough Council and to Local Government.
- Coral Cynthia, Mrs Samuel. For charitable services to the Arts.
- Bryan Moile Sandford. For services to the Church of England.
- Kenneth Douglas Schofield, executive director, PGA European Tour. For services to Golf.
- John Shannon, O.B.E., chairman, York Civic Trust. For services to the community in York.
- Gillian Anne, Mrs Shaw. For services to the Community.
- Richard James Simmonds. For political service.
- John Michael Corbet-Singleton. For political and public service.
- Kenneth Peter Ross Smart, Grade 4, Department of Transport.
- John Michael Smethurst, lately Deputy Chief Executive, the British Library.
- John William Sorrell, chairman, Design Council. For services to Industrial Design.
- Brian John Stewart, Chief Executive, Scottish and Newcastle plc. For services to the Brewing Industry.
- The Honourable Sir Richard Storey, Bt. For services to the Newspaper Industry.
- John Sydney Sutton, General Secretary, Secondary Heads Association. For services to Education.
- Christopher Anthony Swan. For services to the Citizen's Charter.
- Stephen Robin Temple, Grade 4. Department of Trade and Industry.
- Nigel Cooper Thompson, deputy chairman, Ove Arup and Partners. For services to the Construction Industry.
- Peter Kai Thornton. For services to the Sir John Soane's Museum.
- Derek Adrian Truman, lately Grade 5, H.M. Treasury.
- David George Vaisey. For services to the Bodleian Library, Oxford.
- David Anthony Vicary, chairman, Chamber of Coal Traders and chairman, National Association of Solid Fuel Wholesalers. For services to the Coal Industry.
- Professor David James Wallace, F.R.S. For services to Parallel Computing.
- Major General Michael John Hatley Walsh, C.B., D.S.O. For services to the Voluntary Sector.
- Leonard John Warwick, Member, Securities and Investments Board. For services to Financial Regulation.
- Robin Glover Wendt, D.L., Secretary, Association of County Councils. For services to Local Government.
- John Granville Wilkins. For political service.

`Diplomatic Service and Overseas List

- John Frederick Coplin. For services to British interests in Indonesia.
- John Wilfred Sword Fletcher. For services to British interests in Asia.
- Ellis Martin Goodman. For services to British exports to the USA.
- John Albert Sidney Jackson, M.B.E., IP, President of the Senate, Bermuda.
- Professor (Mrs) Ma Chung Ho-kei, O.B.E., J.P. For services to the development of medicine in Hong Kong.
- Ronald Neame. For services to the British film industry.
- Philip John Priestley, lately H.M. Consul-General, Geneva.
- James So Yiu-Cho, O.B.E., J.P., Secretary for Recreation and Culture, Hong Kong.
- Mr Justice Woo Kwok-hing. For services as chairman, Boundary and Election Commission, Hong Kong.

==== Officer of the Order of the British Empire (OBE) ====
Military Division

- Commander Timothy Harold Boycott, Royal Navy.
- Commander Alan Kenneth Grant, Royal Navy.
- Commander Michael Ian Horrell, Royal Navy.
- Commander Charlotte Elizabeth Manley, Royal Navy.
- Commander Howard McFadyen, Royal Navy.
- Commander Richard John Thornton Pallister, Royal Navy.
- Commander William Ross Rennison, Royal Navy.
- Lieutenant Colonel Peter Reginald Cloudesley Dixon, The Royal Anglian Regiment.
- Lieutenant Colonel Paul Fraser, The Royal Logistic Corps.
- Lieutenant Colonel (Acting Colonel) Shane Crisp Hearn, The Royal Green Jackets.
- Lieutenant Colonel (Acting Colonel) Thomas Michael Fitzalan Howard, Scots Guards.
- Acting Colonel David Edwin King, Oxfordshire Army Cadet Force.
- Lieutenant Colonel Nigel Anthony Lampard, The Royal Logistic Corps.
- Lieutenant Colonel Hubert Kelly McAllister, T.D., Royal Army Dental Corps, Territorial Army.
- Lieutenant Colonel Brian Mervyn Semple, Corps of Royal Engineers.
- Wing Commander Peter Basil Akehurst, L.V.O., Royal Air Force.
- Wing Commander Peter Raymond Bowen, Royal Air Force (Retired).
- Wing Commander Hugh Richard Corney, Royal Air Force.
- Wing Commander Gordon James Goodman, Royal Air Force.
- Wing Commander Keith Robert Colin Greaves, Royal Air Force.
- Wing Commander (now Acting Group Captain) Maurice Ian Pettifer, Royal Air Force.
- Squadron Leader John Edward Rands, Royal Air Force.
- Wing Commander Jonathan Kim Wheeler, Royal Air Force.

Civil Division

- Ian Simpson Thomson Adam, Q.F.S.M., Firemaster, Central Scotland Fire Brigade. For services to the Fire Service.
- Professor Ian Douglas Aitken, Director, Moredun Research Institute. For services to Agricultural Science.
- Laurence John Albon, Chairman and Chief Executive, Albon Engineering and Manufacturing plc. For services to the Automobile Components Industry.
- Philip Andrew, lately Chief Executive, British Coal Enterprise Ltd. For services to the Coal Industry.
- Miss Patricia Margaret Andrews, Grade 5, Cabinet Office.
- John Ardley, lately Deputy Controller of Plant Variety Rights, Ministry of Agriculture, Fisheries and Food.
- Timothy Preston Astill, Group Director, National Pharmaceutical Association. For services to the Pharmaceutical Profession.
- Howard Baderman, Consultant in Charge, Accident and Emergencies, University College Hospital, London. For services to Medicine.
- Robert Ernest Bailie. For services to the Printing Industry.
- Andrew Eric Joseph Banfield, President, Chartered Institute of Environmental Health. For services to Environmental Health.
- John Reginald Barrell, T.D., Chief Executive, Institution of Occupational Safety and Health. For services to Health and Safety.
- Bernard Daniel James Barton. For services to the British Red Cross Society in Surrey.
- Trevor John Bayley. For services to Medical Education.
- John Anthony Beaumont, Chief Executive, Institute of Grocery Distribution. For services to the Food Industry.
- John Irving Besent, Superintendent, Epping Forest. For services to Epping Forest and to the Corporation of London.
- Archibald Anderson Bethel, lately Chief Executive, Lanarkshire Development Agency. For services to Enterprise in Lanarkshire.
- Alastair Ross Biggart. For services to the Construction and Tunelling Industries.
- Geoffrey Bernard Blacker, lately Chief Executive and Director of Finance, Royal Borough of Windsor and Maidenhead. For services to Local Government.
- Irene, Mrs Bloor, lately Chairperson, War Widows' Association. For services to War Widows.
- Professor Jennifer Ruth Pryse Boore. For services to Nursing.
- Michael John Booth. For services to International Trade.
- Gillian Evelyn, Viscountess Brentford. For humanitarian services and for services to the community in London.
- Marion Helen, Mrs Brighton, Chairman, Lincolnshire Tourism and lately Member, East Midlands Tourist Board. For services to Tourism in Lincolnshire and South Humberside.
- James Douglas Brown, Chairman, South Ayrshire Hospitals NHS Trust. For services to Health Care.
- Terence Walter Brownlow, lately Principal Professional and Technology Officer, Ministry of Defence.
- Miss Dora May Bryan, Actress. For services to Drama.
- Mirza Michael John Bukht (Michael Barry), Programme Controller, Classic FM. For services to Radio and Television Broadcasting.
- Miss Antonia Janette Bunch, lately Director, Scottish Science Library, National Library of Scotland.
- Neville Edmund Bunting, Grade 7, Department of Social Security.
- Peter Victor Burden, lately Chief Crime Correspondent, Daily Mail. For services to Crime Journalism and to Crime Prevention.
- Michael Burn, lately Grade 7, Department of the Environment.
- Miss Susan Mary Burr, Royal College of Nursing Adviser on Paediatric Nursing. For services to Nursing.
- Peter John Burton, Grade 6, Overseas Development Administration.
- Annette Lorimer Knox, Mrs Cadbury, D.L. For service to the community in Gloucestershire.
- Lieutenant Colonel Harrison Harvey Cail, Executive Secretary, Independent Tank Storage Association. For services to the Oil and Chemical Industries.
- Peter Gavin Caldwell, Grade 7, Health and Safety Executive, Department of the Environment.
- Miss Clare Dixon-Carter. For services to the British Red Cross Society in Scotland.
- Bernard Oliver Clampton. For services to the Royal National Mission to Deep Sea Fishermen.
- Peter Clark, Controller, H.M. Board of Inland Revenue.
- Denis Oliver Cole, lately Chairman, Shaftesbury Housing Association. For services to the housing Association Movement.
- Philip Collcutt, Grade 7, Cabinet Office.
- Miss Sheila Gillian Colvin, General Director, Aldeburgh Foundation. For services to the Arts.
- William Elwyn Conway. For services to Local Government in Wales.
- Graham Hamilton Cooper, Senior Principal Scientific Officer, Ministry of Defence.
- John Edward Cooper, Grade 7, Department for Education and Employment.
- Richard Ernest Cooper. For services to the Magistracy in Buckinghamshire.
- Colin James Craig, Director, Robert Fleming and Company Ltd. For services to the Ministry of Defence.
- Joy Carol, Mrs Cross, Grade 7, Department for Education and Employment.
- Alan George Curtis. For charitable services to Ex-servicemen and Women, and for services to the Airborne Initiative.
- Maurice Dale, lately Grade 7, Ministry of Defence.
- Adrian Marten George Darby, Chairman, Plantlife. For services to Nature Conservation.
- Margaret Wilmett, Mrs Davey. For services to Continuing Education and Training in the London Borough of Croydon.
- Constance Ann Gillian, Mrs Davies, Administrator, the Allen Lane Foundation. For charitable services.
- Colonel Norman Thomas Davies, M.B.E., lately Registrar, General Dental Council. For public service.
- Peter Roger Davies. For services to Education.
- Dennis Tyrone Davis, Q.F.S.M., Chief Fire Officer, Cheshire Fire Brigade. For services to the Fire Service.
- Peter Dawson, Senior Crown Prosecutor, Crown Prosecution Service.
- Richard Anthony Dennis, Grade 6, Ministry of Defence.
- John Elliott Christopher Dicks. For services to the Newspaper Industry.
- Patrick Brian O'Cahir Doherty. For political service.
- John Roland Donovan, Grade 7, Ministry of Defence.
- Andrew Patrick Dougal. For services to Health Care.
- Miss Caroline Elizabeth Anne Dudley, Director, Royal Cornwall Museum, Truro. For services to Museums and Galleries.
- James Andrew Cameron Dunlop, Dairy Farmer. For services to Agriculture.
- John Leeper Dunlop. For services to Horse Racing.
- Prudence, Mrs Earle. For services to the Board of Visitors, HM Prison Blakenhurst.
- Lieutenant Colonel John Halifax Patrick Emerson, Honorary Secretary, Indian Army Association. For services to Ex-Servicemen and Women.
- Professor John Davies Evans, lately Chairman, Treasure Trove Reviewing Committee. For services to Archaeology.
- John Ewington. For services to the Guild of Church Musicians.
- James Angus Gordon Fiddes, Member, Glenrothes Development Corporation. For services to Business.
- David Arthur Ewart Finch. For political and public service.
- Miss Betty Lilian Finch, Member, Boards of Visitors' Co-ordinating Committee. For services to Prisoner Welfare.
- John Fish. For services to the Civil Service Retirement Fellowship.
- Patricia Hilbery, Mrs FitzPatrick. For political service.
- James Angus Ford, Consultant Paediatrician, Rutherglen Maternity Hospital and Royal Hospital for Sick Children, Glasgow. For services to Medicine.
- John Charles Foster, lately Managing Director and Chief Executive, USM Texon Ltd. For services to the Shoe Industry.
- John Fraser, Grade 6, Ministry of Defence.
- Miss Jeane Freeman, Director, Apex Scotland Ltd. For services to the Rehabilitation of Offenders.
- Bernard Frowd, lately Chief Executive and City Treasurer, Exeter City Council, Devon. For services to Local Government.
- Mary Rhoda, Mrs Fyfe. For political service.
- The Reverend Peter John Galloway. For services to the Order of the British Empire.
- Jeremy Peter Gee, Grade 7, Commonwealth War Graves Commission.
- Peter Graham Gething, lately Grade 6, Ministry of Agriculture, Fisheries and Food.
- George Allison Gill, H.M. Inspector, Office for Standards in Education.
- St John Rosslyn Goff, B.E.M. For services to the Magistracy in Gwent.
- Peter Golds. For political service.
- Charles Richard Browne Goldson, Commercial Director, North and West, British Railways Board. For services to the Railway Industry.
- Alexander Goodall, Headteacher, Wester Hailes Education Centre, Edinburgh. For services to Education.
- Ian Gordon, Grade 6, Highways Agency, Department of Transport.
- The Reverend George Gordon Graham. For services to Botany.
- Alan Roy Gray, Chief Fire Officer, Cambridgeshire Fire and Rescue Service. For services to the Fire Service.
- Alexander Gray For services to Rheumatology and Cancer Relief.
- Ann, Mrs Hallett. For political service.
- Walter Weir Sommerville Halley, District Inspector, H.M. Board of Inland Revenue.
- Patrick Gerard Hamill. For services to Education.
- The Venerable Alan Edwin Thomas Harper. For services to Conservation.
- Ronald Arthur Harris, Assistant Chief Investigation Officer, H.M. Board of Customs and Excise.
- Laurence Hardy Harwood, Adviser on Coast and Countryside Strategy Plans, National Trust. For services to Conservation.
- Major Alastair John Crafton Hewat, lately Chairman, Scottish River Purification Boards Association and chairman, Tweed River Purification Board. For services to Conservation.
- Patrick Joseph Higgins. For public service.
- Anita Mary Clarke, Mrs Higham, Principal of Banbury School, Oxfordshire and Director, Heart of England Training and Enterprise Council. For services to Education and Training.
- Sheila Margaret, Mrs Holden, Senior Principal Engineer (Transportation), East Sussex County Council. For services to Transportation Planning.
- John Frederick White Holdich. For political and public service.
- Miss Shana Clare Hole, Special Adviser to the Government Chief Whip.
- Desmond James Hollis, Director of Finance, Devon and Cornwall Constabulary. For services to the Police.
- David Hood, Chairman and Joint Managing Director, Pace Micro Technology Ltd. For services to the Satellite Receiver Industry.
- Lieutenant Colonel Robert William Edward House, M.B.E. For services to War Pensions Committees in Kent.
- Alan Peter Howcroft, lately Principal Professional and Technology Officer, Welsh Office.
- John Anthony Howick, lately Grade 7, Department of Transport.
- Robert Howie, Grade 7, Department of Social Security.
- Kenneth Hudson. For services to Museums.
- Zulfikar Alibhai Jadavji, Audit Manager, National Audit Office.
- John Douglas James, Chief Executive, Woodland Trust. For services to Nature Conservation.
- Harry Jepson. For services to Rugby League Football.
- Michael Denis Jepson, Chairman, Brecon Cathedral 900th Anniversary Appeal. For charitable services.
- Nicholas Jonas, D.L. For services to the community in Hampshire.
- Alan David Jones, Managing Director, TNT Express UK Ltd. For services to the Transport Industry.
- Christopher Frederick Jones, Chief Clerk, Central Office, Royal Courts of Justice.
- Haydn Hugh Griffiths Jones. For services to the community in Dinas Powis, Vale of Glamorgan.
- Leslie David Jones, lately Regional General Manager (Thames), National Rivers Authority. For services to Conservation.
- Robert Gwilym Pritchard-Jones. For services to the Magistracy in Wales.
- Roger Spencer Jones, Managing Director, Penn Pharmaceuticals Ltd. For services to Industry in Wales.
- Stephen Francis Waley Joseph, Executive Director, Transport 2000. For services to Transport and to the Environment.
- Cyril Russell Julian. For services to the St John Ambulance Brigade in Cornwall.
- Martin Newman Karmel, Consultant, British Bankers' Association. For services to Banking.
- Charles Fitzroy Coogan Kaye, lately Chief Executive, Special Hospitals Service Authority. For services to Health Care.
- James Keight, Leader, Knowsley Metropolitan Borough Council. For services to Local Government.
- Ann Elaine, Mrs Kennedy, Grade 6, Foreign and Commonwealth Office.
- Joan, Mrs Keogh. For services to Industrial Tribunals.
- Richard Henry Kimberlin. For services to Animal Health.
- Clifford King, Director, Trafalgar House Corporate Development Ltd. For services to Engineering Exports.
- Ronald Peter Kirby, Director of Public Affairs, the Engineering Council. For services to Engineering.
- Professor Malcolm Harold Lader. For services to the Advisory Council on the Misuse of Drugs.
- Robin James Oliver Lavery, Grade 7, Department of Trade and Industry.
- Anne Deirdre, Mrs Leece. For services to the Soldiers', Sailors' and Airmen's Families Association in West Sussex.
- Clifford Lees, European Patent Attorney. For services to the Patent Industry.
- Donald John Lewin, chairman, Clinton Cards. For services to the Greeting Cards Industry.
- Cyril Mervyn Lewis, Principal and Chief Executive, Swansea College. For services to Further Education in Wales.
- Hywel Eifion Lewis, lately Chairman, Assembly of Welsh County Councils. For services to Local Government in Wales.
- James Frazer Lindsay, lately Head of Information, Forestry Commission.
- Hugh Patrick Linehan. For services to Agriculture.
- Peter Arthur Lister, Senior Principal Scientific Officer, Health and Safety Executive.
- Moir Lockhead, Chief Executive and Deputy Chairman, First Bus plc. For services to the Bus Industry.
- James Logan, Actor, comedian and entertainer. For services to Entertainment.
- Samuel Morrell Lyons. For services to Medicine.
- James Brian Chambers Lyttle. For services to the Rehabilitation of Offenders.
- Pamela Mary, Mrs Mackay. For political service.
- Miss Patricia Kathleen Randall Mann (Mrs Walker). For services to the Food Advisory Committee.
- George Hugh Marriage, Grade 6, Home Office.
- Peter John Dixon Marshall. For charitable services to the community in Yorkshire.
- Terence William Marshall, Grade 6, H.M. Board of Customs and Excise.
- Patrick William Bussell Masefield. For services to the Arts.
- David Leslie Mason. For services to Health Charities.
- Manmohan Singh Matharu, Consultant in Public Health Medicine. For services to Medicine.
- Bernard Brian McCann, Chairman, South East Asia Committee, British Overseas Trade Board. For services to Export.
- William Gerard Vincent McCarney. For services to the Magistracy.
- Hugh Montgomery McIlvanney. For services to Sports Journalism.
- John Charles McIntosh, Headmaster, The London Oratory School, Fulham. For services to Education.
- Althea Icolyn, Mrs McLean. For services to Community Relations in Watford, Hertfordshire.
- John David Alexander McWilliam, Deputy Vice Chancellor, University of Greenwich. For services to Education.
- Manubhai Bhogilal Mehta, lately Chief Executive, Torfaen Borough Council. For services to Local Government in Wales.
- Rob Mellors, Team Leader, Pilot District Support Project, Midlands Province, Zimbabwe. For humanitarian services.
- Professor Hugh Graham Miller, Head, Department of Forestry, University of Aberdeen. For services to Forestry.
- Alan Mills. For services to Lawn Tennis.
- Thomas Gerald John Moag. For services to Education.
- Ian Charles Hugh Moody, D.L., Chairman, St John Council for Devon. For services to the St John Ambulance Brigade.
- David Gordon Morgan. For political and public service.
- Ivan Morrison, Songwriter, Singer and Musician. For services to Music.
- Peter Francis Morrisroe, Managing Director, Airport Co-ordination Ltd. For services to the Aviation Industry.
- Ian Forbes Mortimer, Fine Printer. For services to Printing.
- William Mountain, Team Leader, H.M. Board of Inland Revenue.
- Bernard Patrick Murphy. For public service.
- David Spencer Baird-Murray, D.L. For services to Tourism in Wales.
- Peter Murray, Founder and Executive Director, Yorkshire Sculpture Park. For services to Sculpture.
- Helen Ruth, Mrs Ostrycharz, Chairman, Ayrshire, Inverclyde and Argyll Committee for the Employment of People with Disabilities. For services to Disabled People.
- Richard Eric Painter, Chief Executive, ADT Education Trust Ltd. For services to Education.
- Colin Murray Parkes, President, Cruse Bereavement Care. For services to Bereaved People.
- Sylvia, Mrs Peach, Chairman, Board of Visitors, H.M. Prison Winchester. For services to Prisoner Welfare.
- Michael Stuart Pickering, Chairman, Agricultural Advisory Panel for Wales. For services to Agriculture.
- Brian Alexander Martin Piggott, Grade 6, Department of Trade and Industry.
- David Alan Pinder. For political service.
- Derek Robert Pollard, National Commissioner for Adult Support, Scout Association. For services to Scouting.
- Professor James Alfred Powell, Director, Graduate School, University of Salford. For services to Science and to Engineering Education.
- Daphne June, Mrs Priestley, D.L. For services to the Magistracy in Berkshire and to the Thames Valley Police Authority.
- Miss Maureen Lilian Purvis, Grade 6, Department of Health.
- Malcolm Andrew Rae, Nurse Adviser, Mental Health Services, Salford NHS Trust. For services to Health Care.
- Herbert H. Raphael. For charitable services in Greater Manchester.
- Professor Desmond Rea. For services to Local Government.
- Francis Vaughan Rees, lately Grade 7, Department of National Heritage.
- Grahame Hughes Rees, lately Group Leader, Theory and Future Projects, Rutherford Appleton Laboratory. For services to Particle Acceleration Theory.
- Margaret Jane, Mrs Rees, Principal, Coventry Technical College. For services to Further Education.
- Barbara Brand Laing, Mrs Reid. For services to Children's Panels and to Young People in Scotland.
- Frederick Brian Rennie, Personnel Adviser, H.M. Board of Inland Revenue.
- Michael George Richards, lately Grade 7, Welsh Office.
- Christopher Keith Richardson, M.B.E., Principal Consultant, Roke Manor Research Ltd. For services to the Defence Industry.
- Ian Billington Ritchie, Regional Director, Thames Water. For services to the Water Industry and to Export.
- Lieutenant Colonel Thomas Ian McLaren Robinson. For services to the Army Benevolent Fund.
- Maureen, Mrs Rooney. For services to Women's Issues.
- Colonel Peter George Rosser, M.B.E. For political service.
- Malcolm Spencer Rudkin, D.L. For political and public service.
- Colin Anthony Rugg. For services to the Services Sound and Vision Corporation.
- Alan Gray Rutherford, Scotch Whisky Production Director, United Distillers plc. For services to the Scotch Whisky Industry.
- Professor Eric Edward Sainsbury. For services to the community particularly voluntary organisations, in Sheffield.
- Joan Mary, Mrs Sallis, President, Campaign for State Education. For services to Education.
- Bryan Campbell Sewell, lately Deputy Director of Works, House of Commons.
- Paul Anthony Shaw, Chief Executive, Southampton and South West Hampshire Health Authority. For services to Health Care.
- Albert James Sherrard. For services to the Health Care Industry.
- John Bourne Shropshire, Managing Director, the Shropshire Group. For services to the Horticulture Industry and to Export.
- Miss Janet Helen Silver (Mrs Albu), lately Principal Optometrist, Moorfields Eye Hospital Nhs Trust. For services to Health Care.
- Indarjit Singh. For services to Urban Regeneration.
- Hugh Drew Sloan, Managing Director, Semex UK. For services to the Dairy Industry.
- Ian Reid Dykes Smillie, lately Chief Executive, Kyle and Carrick District Council. For services to Local Government.
- David Arthur George Smith, Headmaster, Bradford Grammar School, West Yorkshire. For services to Education.
- Miss Sally Belinda Smith, Divisional Design Director, Clothing Division, Coats Viyella plc. For services to the Clothing Industry.
- Clive Roderick Sneddon, lately Leader of the Administration, North East Fife District Council. For services to Local Government in Scotland.
- Michael Lawrence Somers. For services to the Institute of Oceanographic Sciences and to Sonar Surveying.
- Captain Herbert Franklin Spencer, R.N. (Retd), Co-ordinator, ODA's Emergency Engineering Unit. For humanitarian services in the former Yugoslavia.
- Roy Staples, T.D. For services to the community in Spalding, Lincolnshire.
- John Carwin Stewart, lately Director of Finance and Deputy Chief Executive, Dumfries and Galloway Regional Council. For services to Local Government.
- Thomas Stuttaford. For political service.
- Robin James Harry Sumpter, Chairman, Scunthorpe Social Security Tribunal. For services to the community in Scunthorpe, Humberside.
- Peter Charles Swain, Director, Living Options East Devon. For services to Disabled People.
- Marney Jane, Mrs Swan. For political service.
- Peter Simon Tanner, Principal Scientific Officer, Ministry of Defence.
- David Scott Tennet, Managing Director, GEC Marconi Defence Systems. For services to the Defence Industry.
- Brian Thaxter, D.L. For services to the community in Merseyside.
- Bernard Thomas, lately Works Director, Sekisui. For services to Industry in South Wales.
- John Hugh Thomas. For services to Music in Wales.
- Roger John Thompson, Chairman and Managing Director, Guide Friday Ltd. For services to Tourism.
- Thomas Walter Thompson, Director of Planning and Transportation, Leicestershire County Council. For services to Civil Engineering and to Highway Maintenance.
- Edward David Macrae Tod, President, National Association of Fundholding Practices. For services to Medicine.
- Helen Patricia, Mrs Toft, Chief Waste Regulation Officer. For services to Waste Regulation.
- Graham Alfred Treadwell, Grade 7, Home Office.
- Miss Joanna Trollope, Novelist. For services to Literature.
- Barbara, Mrs Vaughan, Chair, Scottish Community Education Council and Team Leader of Public Administration, Leisure and Tourism, Angus College. For services to Education.
- The Reverend Michael David Vockins. For services to Cricket.
- (Graeme) Murray Walker. For services to Broadcasting and to Motor Sports.
- John Walton, Deputy District Valuer, H.M. Board of Inland Revenue.
- Leslie Howard Walton, Headteacher, Norham Community High School, North Tyneside. For services to Education.
- George McIlroy Wanless, lately Chairman, East Lothian District Council. For services to Local Government in Scotland.
- (Arthur) Ronald Dare Watkins. For services to the Globe Theatre.
- Cecilia Emily, Mrs Wells, Equal Opportunities Commissioner. For services to Equal Opportunities.
- Eric Welsh, Managing Director, Tees Dockyard Ltd. For services to the Shipbuilding Industry.
- Ronald Edmund Weston, lately Member, National Rivers Authority. For services to Conservation.
- Alan Reynolds Westwell, Chief Executive and managing director, Greater Manchester Buses North Ltd. For services to Public Transport in Greater Manchester.
- Frank Westwell, Grade 6, Department of Health.
- Sir James Herbert Ingham Whitaker, Bt. For services to Atlantic College, West Glamorgan and to Young People.
- Raymond Carson White, B.E.M. For services to the Police.
- Robert Ian Kirkland White, lately Chief Estates Officer, Scottish Office.
- Joan Marie, Mrs Wiggall, M.B.E. For services to the British Red Cross Society in Hertfordshire.
- Henry Russell Wilkinson, lately Director of Accounting Practice, Audit Commission. For services to Accountancy and to Local Government.
- John Kenneth Williams. For services to the Soldiers', Sailors' and Airmen's Families Association.
- Michael Ian Willis, Chief Executive, West Country Ambulance Services NHS Trust. For services to the Ambulance Service.
- Anthony Wilfred Wilshaw, Grade 7, Department for Education and Employment.
- Catherine Mary, Mrs Wilson, Director, Norfolk Museums Service. For services to Museums and Galleries.
- David Thomas Robison Wilson. For political and public service.
- Derrick Raymond Wilson. For services to the Coal Trade Benevolent Association.
- Dinah Mary, Mrs Winstone, Head of Radiography, Breast Test Wales. For services to Health Care.
- Anthea, Mrs Worsdall, Secretary, Anti-Counterfeiting Group. For services to Industry.
- Peter Gerard Allan. For services to British commercial interests in France.
- Robin Grenville Baylis, M.V.O., Resident Acting High Commissioner, Antigua.
- John William Beith. For services to British commercial interests in Brazil.
- George Benedict Joseph Pascal Busby, lately First Secretary, H.M. Embassy, Belgrade.
- James Cavin Alexander McLaughlan Clephane, First Secretary, British High Commission Bandar Seri Begawan.
- David Stanley Davies. For voluntary services to community welfare in Hong Kong.
- Miss Beryl Delve-Sanders. For services to relief work in Zaire.
- Rodney Gordon Franks. For services to British commercial interests in Malaysia.
- Peter Alexander Gardiner. For services to British commercial interests in the USA.
- Graham Mitchell Harris. For services to British commercial and financial interests in Japan.
- Claus-Christian Henning, Director, British Council, Romania.
- John Barry Hodson. For services to British exports in the USA.
- Professor Ralph Lainson. For services to parasitology in Brazil.
- Billy Lam Chung-lun, J.P., Director, New Airport Projects Co-ordination Office, Hong Kong.
- Margaret Kelly, Mrs Leibovici. For services to entertainment and charity.
- John Leong Chi-yan, J.P. For services to health education and the community, Hong Kong.
- The Honourable Eric Li Ka-cheung, J.P. For distinguished public service, Hong Kong.
- Anthony Donald Lilley. For services to English language teaching in Egypt.
- Franklyn Vere Michael, Permanent Secretary, Chief Minister's Office, Montserrat.
- Ernest George Montado. For distinguished public service, Gibraltar.
- Christopher Roger Moss. For services to the Mass Transit Railway Corporation and to community welfare, Hong Kong.
- Frederick Pett, L.V.O. First Secretary, British High Commission, Islamabad.
- Gordon Andrew Pirie, First Secretary and DHM, H.M. Embassy Rabat.
- Gerald Preskey. For services to British commercial interests in Russia.
- Charles Edward Arthur Ripley, First Secretary, H.M. Embassy, Tokyo.
- George Albert Shearing. For services to music and Anglo-American relations.
- The Honourable Gerald Dennis Edison Simons. For services to public and environmental interests in Bermuda.
- The Reverend (Miss) Betty Margaret Slader, M.B.E. For welfare services to the community in Fiji.
- Kevin Gerald Spears. For services to British Council work in India and South Asia.
- Miss Catherine Anne Stephens, lately deputy director, British Council, Indonesia.
- John Takield. For services to British commercial interests in Switzerland.
- John Telford, IP. For public service, Hong Kong.
- Hubert Ward, Headmaster, English College, Prague.
- Donald McFarlane Watson, Q.P.M., C.P.M., Commissioner, Customs and Excise, Hong Kong.
- Charles Hugo Wheatley. For services to education, British Virgin Islands.
- Miss Margaret Rose Willock. For services to broadcasting, Montserrat.
- Simon Jules Wilson, First Secretary, H.M. Embassy, Zagreb.
- Louis Kar-chit Wong. For services to trade and exports, Hong Kong.
- Peter Joseph Woods. For services to British commercial interests in Japan.
- Michael York. For services to acting and to charity.

==== Member of the Order of the British Empire (MBE) ====
Military Division

- Lieutenant Commander Richard John Charge, Royal Navy.
- Warrant Officer Class 2 Frank Taylor Connelly, Royal Marines.
- Warrant Officer Graham Barry Cudmore.
- Captain (Local Major) Edward Grant Martin Davis, Royal Marines.
- Warrant Officer Peter David Dismore.
- Lieutenant Commander Robin Edward Drewett, Royal Navy.
- Charge Chief Weapon Engineering Artificer Wim James Michael Egging.
- Warrant Officer Class 1 (Regimental Sergeant Major) Colin Frederick Grice, Royal Marines.
- Warrant Officer Peter Harris.
- Warrant Officer Class 1 John Martin Kimbrey, Royal Marines.
- Charge Chief Weapon Engineering Artificer Jeffery Paul Lloyd.
- Warrant Officer David Neil Lovatt.
- Chaplain Brian Richard Madders, Royal Navy.
- Lieutenant Brian Henry Marsh, Royal Navy.
- Warrant Officer Robert Arthur Henry Matthews.
- Warrant Officer Peter McGarrity.
- Lieutenant Commander Ian McLaren, Royal Navy.
- Warrant Officer Mervyn James Meekins.
- Chief Petty Officer Weapons Engineering Mechanic (Radio) Stephen Anthony Morrish.
- Lieutenant Neil Riches, Royal Navy.
- Lieutenant Harry Charles Roberts, Royal Navy.
- Warrant Officer Michael Gerrard Sullivan.
- Wren Writer 1st Class Natalie Ruth Swan.
- Warrant Officer Class 1 James McCallum Archibald, The Highlanders.
- Captain David Thomas Attwood, The King's Regiment.
- Major David Christopher Bowen, Corps of Royal Engineers.
- Warrant Officer Class 2 John Austin Caldwell, The Royal Logistic Corps.
- Warrant Officer Class 2 John Carroll, Corps of Royal Electrical and Mechanical Engineers.
- Major Ronald Clemison, Scots Guards.
- Warrant Officer Class 1 David Cooper, Corps of Royal Electrical and Mechanical Engineers.
- Acting Major Francis Neil Cooper, Royal Grammar School High Wycombe Combined Cadet Force.
- Sergeant (Acting Colour Sergeant) Ernest Clive Gwynn Davies, The Parachute Regiment.
- Captain (Acting Major) Denis Nigel Dillon, The Royal Logistic Corps.
- Captain John James Dineen, The Royal Gloucestershire, Berkshire and Wiltshire Regiment.
- Warrant Officer Class 2 Stephen John Dinley, Small Arms School Corps.
- Captain Graeme Ferguson, B.E.M., Corps of Royal Engineers.
- Major John Wickham Filmer, Corps of Royal Electrical and Mechanical Engineers.
- Warrant Officer Class 2 George Albert Firth, Royal Corps of Signals.
- Staff Sergeant Paul Edward Fisher, Corps of Royal Electrical and Mechanical Engineers.
- Warrant Officer Class 2 David Doddridge Fox, Royal Corps of Signals.
- Major Michael Anthony Gallagher, The Royal Logistic Corps.
- Warrant Officer Class 1 Paul Clifford Gardner, The Royal Gloucestershire, Berkshire and Wiltshire Regiment.
- Major William Eric Gawler, The Princess of Wales's Royal Regiment, Territorial Army.
- Acting Lieutenant Colonel Michael Howard Gerrish, Northumberland Army Cadet Force.
- Captain Patrick Joseph Gill, The Royal Logistic Corps, Territorial Army.
- Lieutenant (Acting Captain) Rodney Shane Foster Greene, Corps of Royal Engineers.
- Major Paul David Greeves, The Parachute Regiment.
- Major John Stanley Grinstead, The Royal Logistic Corps.
- Major (Gurkha Commissioned Officer) Milanchandra Gurung, The Queen's Gurkha Engineers.
- Major (Gurkha Commissioned Officer) Udaibahadur Gurung, The Royal Gurkha Rifles.
- Warrant Officer Class 2 Martin Neil Harmer, Corps of Royal Electrical and Mechanical Engineers.
- Major Grant Jonathan Leslie Holdom, Royal Regiment of Artillery.
- Major John William Hornby, Royal Corps of Signals.
- Major Christopher Royston Howse, The Worcestershire and Sherwood Foresters Regiment.
- Captain (Acting Major) Philip James Ingram, Corps of Royal Electrical and Mechanical Engineers.
- Warrant Officer Class 2 Eric Leonard Jones, The Royal Green Jackets.
- Major William John Kintrea, The Highlanders.
- Major Graham John Lacey, Small Arms School Corps.
- Major Barry John Le Grys, Corps of Royal Engineers.
- Major (Queen's Gurkha Officer) Chandraprasad Limbu, The Royal Gurkha Rifles.
- Warrant Officer Class 2 Martin John Stuart Lock, Corps of Royal Electrical and Mechanical Engineers.
- Sergeant Angus Macpherson, Royal Corps of Signals.
- Warrant Officer Class 1 Gerald Madine, The Royal Logistic Corps.
- Major Arup Mahanty, The Royal Logistic Corps.
- Corporal Catherine Bernadette McCurry Munro, Adjutant General's Corps (SPS).
- Major Nigel John Hugh Naylor, Royal Corps of Signals.
- Major Henry Shaun O'Neill, The Light Dragoons.
- Warrant Officer Class 1 David George Anthony Parish, Corps of Royal Electrical and Mechanical Engineers, Territorial Army.
- Sergeant Ronnie Pearsall, Corps of Royal Electrical and Mechanical Engineers.
- Lieutenant Colonel David Gordon Reddin, Adjutant General's Corps (Als).
- Major Philip Spencer Russell, The Parachute Regiment.
- Warrant Officer Class 1 Stephen Carl Sabellini, Adjutant General's Corps (SPS).
- Warrant Officer Class 1 William Shaw, Adjutant General's Corps (RMP).
- Major Ian Barry Smeaton, Royal Regiment of Artillery.
- Major Robin Staveley, Royal Regiment of Artillery.
- Warrant Officer Class 1 William Sumpter, Adjutant General's Corps (RMP).
- Major Christopher Wakerley, Royal Corps of Signals.
- Captain Roy Keith Burgess Walker, The Royal Logistic Corps.
- Corporal Stuart William Walker, The Royal Logistic Corps.
- Major Adrian Christopher Dickenson Walton, T.D., The Staffordshire Regiment, Territorial Army.
- Major Matthew William Whitchurch, Corps of Royal Engineers.
- Major Alexander David Thompson Whitfield, Adjutant General's Corps (Ets).
- Lieutenant Colonel Peter Douglas Ashton-Wickett, Royal Regiment of Artillery.
- Captain Siu Ying Wu, The Royal Logistic Corps.
- Major George Moore Wylie, Royal Corps of Signals, Territorial Army.
- Major Gordon William Alexander Young, The Parachute Regiment.
- Sergeant Terance Michael Young, The Royal Green Jackets, Territorial Army.
- Chief Technician (Acting Flight Sergeant) William Batson, Royal Air Force.
- Squadron Leader Stanley Beighton, A.E., Royal Air Force Volunteer Reserve.
- Sergeant Philip Bushe, Royal Air Force.
- Squadron Leader Clifford Karl Christensen, Royal Air Force.
- Squadron Leader Brian Finbarr Coleby, Royal Air Force.
- Warrant Officer Bryan Michael Cross, Royal Air Force.
- Flight Lieutenant Derek John Cunningham, Royal Air Force.
- Warrant Officer Derek Alan Granger, Royal Air Force.
- Squadron Leader Peter George Hicks, Royal Air Force.
- Flight Lieutenant Alan Arthur Howard, Royal Air Force Volunteer Reserve (Training).
- Warrant Officer Peter John Julian, Royal Air Force.
- Sergeant Michael George Larkman, Royal Air Force.
- Squadron Leader Paul Frederick Lindsay, Royal Air Force.
- Squadron Leader (now Wing Commander) William John Mccarthy, Royal Air Force.
- Squadron Leader Peter Godfrey Miles, Royal Air Force.
- Flight Sergeant Kathryn Joy Needham, Royal Air Force.
- Squadron Leader Barry Mark North, Royal Air Force.
- Sergeant Charles Paffett, Royal Air Force Regiment.
- Squadron Leader Ian Steven Pollitt, Royal Air Force.
- Junior Technician Brian Mark Powell, Royal Air Force.
- Flight Lieutenant Derek Redman, A.E., Royal Air Force Volunteer Reserve (Retired).
- Flight Lieutenant Bryan Thomas Richardson, Royal Air Force.
- Flight Lieutenant Philip Arthur Thomas Shaw, A.E., Royal Auxiliary Air Force (Retired).
- Sergeant Grenville John Smith, Royal Air Force (Retired).
- Sergeant Barry Raymond Tanswell, Royal Air Force.
- Flight Lieutenant David Stewart Webster, Royal Air Force.
- Flight Lieutenant Raymond Garden Whittingham, Royal Air Force.

Civil Division

- Betty, Mrs Abbott, Voluntary Services Co-ordinator, East Yorkshire Hospitals NHS Trust. For services to Health Care.
- Joan Mary, Mrs Abbott. For services to the community in and around West Wittering, West Sussex.
- Robina Gordon, Mrs Addison. For services to the community in Montrose, Angus.
- Daphne Jean, Mrs Agnew, Admissions Manager, Housing Department, Birmingham City Council. For services to Local Government.
- Farhad Ahmed, Divisional Officer, Metropolitan Special Constabulary. For services to the Police.
- Philip John Aindow, T.D., Higher Executive Officer, Department of Social Security.
- Russell Ainsley, Executive Officer, H.M. Board of Customs and Excise.
- Shireen, Mrs Akbar, Head of Adult and Community Education, Victoria and Albert Museum.
- Miss Diana Marie, Alderson. For services to the community in Haddenham, Buckinghamshire.
- Dylis, Mrs Allen, Youth Worker, Talaton, Devon. For services to Young People.
- Evlyn Mae Thomson, Mrs Allsop, Lately Headteacher, Kennoway Primary and Community School, Fife. For services to Education.
- Harry Rodney Alpin, Group Medical Adviser, Yorkshire Electricity Group plc. For services to Occupational Health.
- Gordon Herbert Ambler. For services to the community in Woodhouse Eaves, Leicestershire.
- Ilona Anne, Mrs Anderson. For services to the Duchess of Kent Residential Home, Guernsey.
- Rita Roberta, Mrs Angrisani, lately Personal Secretary, H.M. Board of Inland Revenue.
- Derek Ivison Armitage, lately Quality Manager, Ultra Electronics Ltd. For services to the Aerospace and Defence Industries.
- Captain Alexander Davidson Auld, Trustee, Peterhead Harbour Board. For services to the Fishing Industry.
- Benjamin Bagshawe. For services to the Bureau of Analysed Samples Ltd.
- Francis John Baillie. For humanitarian services in the former Yugoslavia.
- John Bainbridge. For services to the Territorial, Auxiliary and Volunteer Reserve Association in the North of England.
- Betty, Mrs Baines. For services to the community in Carnforth, Lancashire.
- Ernest Edwin Baines. For services to the Bognor Regis War Memorial Hospital, West Sussex.
- Miss Margaret Emily Baker. For services to the British Red Cross Society.
- Richard Balharry, Promotions Officer, Scottish Natural Heritage. For services to Nature Conservation.
- Sheila, Mrs Banham, lately Senior Executive Officer, Intervention Board Executive Agency.
- Elizabeth Jane, Mrs Barrance. For services to the community in Moggerhanger Bedfordshire.
- Joan, Mrs Barratt, Executive Officer, Insolvency Service, Department of Trade and Industry.
- Michael John Barratt. For services to Disabled People in East Sussex.
- Dorothy, Mrs Bartet, School Nurse, Langside School, Dorset. For services to Young People.
- Maximilian Gort-Barten, chairman, DUALIT. For services to the Catering Industry.
- Michael James Bayliss, lately Highways Inspector, Hereford City Council. For services to Highway Maintenance.
- David Leslie Beacock,. Chief Clerk of Works, G Maunsell & Partners. For services to Civil Engineering.
- Margaret Mary Ann, Mrs Beales, Support Grade 1, H.M. Treasury.
- Malcolm Beaumont, Higher Executive Officer, Department of Social Security.
- Myrtle Doreen, Mrs Beck. For services to the National Association for the Relief of Paget's Disease.
- Hardip Singh Bedi, Senior Executive Officer, Department of Health.
- Douglas McGibney Bell, lately Craftsman, Scottish Power plc. For services to the Electricity Industry.
- Judith Margaret, Mrs Bell, Honorary Fellow, University of Sheffield. For services to Education Research.
- Philip John Reginald Bell, General Medical Practitioner, Leicester. For services to Medicine.
- Ronald Leslie Bell, Chief Cashier, Power Systems Plant, Lucas Industries. For services to the Defence Industry.
- George Bennett. For services to the Rehabilitation of Offenders.
- Edith, Mrs Bentley. For services to Elderly People in Huddersfield, West Yorkshire.
- Jack Berry. For charitable services and for services to Horseracing.
- Bryan Biggs, Director, Bluecoat Arts Centre, Liverpool. For services to the Arts in Liverpool.
- Margaret Lily, Mrs Bingham. For services to the community in Pilsley, Derbyshire.
- Peter John Bisson, Coxswain, St Peter Port Lifeboat, RNLI. For services to Safety at Sea.
- Gordon Forman Blackie, Retained Station Officer, Lothian and Borders Fire Brigade. For services to the Fire Service.
- Kate, Mrs Blackman. For services to the Care and Resettlement of Offenders in Hampshire.
- Raymond George Blackman, Sales and Marketing Manager, GQ Parachutes Ltd. For services to the Parachute Industry.
- Alan Herbert Vawser Bloom. For services to Horticulture.
- Dorothy, Mrs Boggis. For services to the community in Lowestoft, Suffolk.
- Ernest William Bolton. For services to the community in Flintshire.
- Jennifer Margaret, Mrs Bone, Pro Vice-Chancellor, University of the West of England, Bristol. For services to Higher Education.
- William John Boston. For services to the community in Wigan, Greater Manchester.
- William Bottomley. For services to Training in Staffordshire.
- Miss Betty Westwood Linnell Boughton. For political and public service.
- Amethyst Vivienne, Mrs Bowrin, lately Administrative Officer, Department of Health.
- Jane Inman, Mrs Boyd, Custodian, Moffat Museum. For services to the community in Moffat, Dumfriesshire.
- George Kenneth Boyden. For services to the St John Ambulance Brigade and to the community in Stratford-upon-Avon, Warwickshire.
- Richard John Braddon. For services to the St John Ambulance Brigade.
- John Michael Brennan. For services to Link Radio and to Elderly People in Essex.
- Miss Anne Valerie Bretherick. For political service.
- Dorothy Freda, Mrs Broaderwick. For services to the Magistracy in Warley, West Midlands.
- Brian William Broadhead, lately managing director, Coal Contractors Ltd. For services to the Coal Industry.
- Arthur Bromley. For services to Angling for People with Disabilities.
- Claude Basil Brooks, chairman, Angilla Improvement Association, West Indian Standing Committee, Slough. African/Caribbean Co-ordinating Committee. For services to Community Relations.
- Duncan Brown. For services to the Boys' Brigade in Port Glasgow, Renfrewshire.
- George Joseph Brown, lately Area Manager, Hales Waste Control Ltd. For services to Waste Management.
- Isabel, Mrs Brown. For services to the Oxfordshire Association for the Blind.
- Miss Margaret Ann Brown. For services to the Laboratory of Molecular Biology, Cambridge.
- Norah Sophia, Mrs Brown. For services to Tourism.
- Paul Glyn Browning, Special Constabulary Commandant and Scenes of Crime Officer, Kent County Constabulary. For services to the Police.
- Miss Amy Louise Browse. For services to the community in Willand, Devon.
- Nancy C, Mrs Bruce, Assistant Headteacher, Kelso High School, Roxburghshire. For services to Education.
- Richard Frank Brundle. For political service.
- Angus Findlay Brymer, Traincrew Leader, Hereford, Transrail Ltd, British Railways. For services to the Railway Industry.
- Derek James Budd, Director, Mental Health Services, Eastbourne and County Healthcare Trust, East Sussex. For services to Health Care.
- Elsa Violet, Mrs Bulmer. For services to the community in Petersfield, Hampshire.
- Anthony Burgess, Prison Officer, H.M. Prison Ford.
- Miss Lyndall Burnham, Sub Divisional Telephonist, Leicestershire Constabulary. For services to the Police.
- Ralph Bernard Burquest, Force Statistical Officer, Merseyside Police. For services to the Police.
- James Sydney Burrows. For services to the community in Islington, London.
- Miss Kate Florence Burton. For services to the community in Croydon, Surrey.
- Priscilla Margaret, Lady Burton. For services to SCOPE and to the community in Ipswich, Suffolk.
- Vera Rimmelion, Mrs Bush. For services to the community in Devizes, Wiltshire.
- Ann, Mrs Butler, chairman, Dersingham Phobbies Club. For services to Disabled People in Norfolk.
- Nigel Christopher Butler, Operations Director, Spectra-Tek UK Ltd. For services to the Computer and Energy Industries.
- Richard Keith Butler, Director, Dalmellington and District Conservation Trust. For services to Conservation.
- Nora Elizabeth, Mrs Byng. For services to the community in Bromsgrove, Worcestershire.
- Miss Margery Edith Cadman. For services to the Royal British Legion in Wickham Market, Suffolk.
- Helen, Mrs Cameron. For services to the Multiple Sclerosis Society in the Borders.
- John Campbell. For services to the Police.
- Murdina, Mrs Campbell, chairwoman, Lochbroom Community Council. For services to the community in Ullapool and Lochbroom, Ross-shire.
- David Capel, lately Manager, Repair Engineering, Product Support, Rolls-Royce Commercial Aeroengines Ltd. For services to Engineering.
- Nora, Mrs Carlisle. For services to Road Safety.
- Donald Boys Carman, Member, Ditton Parish Council, Aylesford, Kent. For services to Local Government.
- Gladys Evelyn, Mrs Carmichael. For services to the community in Holywell, Flintshire.
- Frank Carnall. For services to the Cardiothoracic Centre, Liverpool.
- Kathleen M, Mrs Carrigan. For political service.
- Trevor Maurice Cartwright, Personnel Manager, Systems Group, Vosper Thornycroft (UK) Ltd. For services to the Defence Industry.
- Miss Helen Margaret Cattanach. For services to the Royal Air Forces Association in Scotland.
- Prashun Kumar Chakraverty, Senior Executive Officer, H.M. Board of Customs and Excise.
- Anne Elizabeth, Mrs Charles, Warden, Gorran Haven Sheltered Housing Unit, Restormel Borough Council. For services to Elderly People.
- Robert Arthur Chenery, Head, Borough Liaison and Development, London Tourist Board. For services to Tourism in London.
- Alan Arthur Chesters. For services to the Barr Hill Lads Club and to Association Football in Salford, Greater Manchester.
- Alan William Chilvers. For charitable services and services to the community in Outwood, Surrey.
- Anthony Hugh Chivers. For charitable services to the Dental Profession.
- Neville John Churcher. For services to Architecture.
- Michael David Clack, Principal Lecturer, School of Music, Colchester Institute, Essex. For services to Music Education.
- Ronald Wilfred Clargo, managing director, Alfred Maltby Bookbinders. For services to Bookbinding.
- Miss Gillian Margaret Clark. For services to Badminton.
- Michael John Clarke, Senior Executive Officer, Foreign and Commonwealth Office.
- Geoffrey Malcolm Clarkson. For services to Angling.
- John Bruce Clayton. For services to the Cheshire County Libraries.
- Bernard Cecil Clewes, President, West Kent Battalion, Boys' Brigade. For services to Young People.
- John Ernest Clifton. For services to Athletics.
- Miss Alice May Clough. Administrative Officer, Department of Social Security.
- John Henry Clutterbuck. For services to St Michael's School, Barnstaple, Devon.
- John Grant Cobb. For services to the community, particularly Disabled People, in the West Midlands.
- Norman Isaac Cohen. For services to the Jewish community in Cardiff.
- Gladys Nellie, Mrs Coley. For services to the Sunshine Club, Cradley Heath, West Midlands.
- Nancie, Mrs Colling. For services to Women's Bowls.
- Philip Howard Collins, engineering director, Smiths Industries plc. For services to Engineering.
- William John Frank Collins. For services to the Not Forgotten Association.
- Miss Daphne Margaret Connelly, lately Economic Adviser, British Printing Industries Federation. For services to the Printing Industry.
- Stanley James Alan Cook, Higher Executive Officer, Ministry of Defence.
- Keith William Cornford. For services to the community, particularly Scouting, in the West Midlands.
- Pauline Mary, Mrs Cornwall. For services to the community in Sundon, Bedfordshire.
- William Alfred Corten For services to the Mobility of Disabled People in Derbyshire.
- Cynthia Mary Margaret, Mrs Courtney. For charitable services in Newport, Gwent.
- Michael John Cowan, Principal Prison Officer, H.M. Young Offenders' Institution Feltham.
- Gilbert Kirkwood Cox, D.L. For services to the community in Airdrie, Strathclyde.
- Gwendoline Mary, Mrs Cox. For services to the Royal National Institute for the Blind.
- Colin Joseph Craig. For services to the community.
- Gladys Doreen, Mrs Crawford. For services to Education.
- Jean Barbara Violet, Mrs Cream, lately Administrative Officer, Department of Transport.
- John Charles Edward Cripps, Emergencies Warehouse Manager, OXFAM. For humanitarian services in Rwanda.
- Miss Marie R. Cross. For services to Bell Ringing and to the community in Oxfordshire.
- Roger Edward Cross, Technical Consultant, BAe Defence. For services to the Defence Industry.
- James Henry Crowe, Director, Railway Community Network, British Railways Board. For services to the Railway Industry.
- Joseph Cumming, lately Member, West Lothian District Council. For services to Local Government in Scotland.
- Ian Ralph Cunningham, lately Senior Executive Officer, H.M. Treasury.
- Sheila Ada, Mrs Cutajar, Occupational Health Manager, Allied Steel and Wire Ltd. For services to Health and Safety in the Steel Industry.
- Sandra, Mrs Dale, PB8, Department for Education and Employment.
- Bhagabat Charan Das, President, Indian Senior Citizens' Centre, Manchester. For services to the community.
- Patricia Ellen, Mrs Davey, Local Officer 2, Department of Social Security.
- Alexander Hugh Ririe Davidson, Pipe Major and Chief Piping Instructor, Central Regional Council. For services to Music.
- William Davidson. For services to the community in Burghead, Morayshire.
- Miss Irene Mina Davies, President, South Caernarfonshire Ladies' Guild, RNLI. For services to the RNLI.
- Terence Davies. For services to Young People in Caerphilly, South Wales.
- Wendy Mary, Mrs Davis, Matron and Manager, Maesteg Community Hospital, Bridgend. For services to Health Care.
- Alfred Edward Alan Day, D.L., Voluntary Observer, Meteorological Office, Kent.
- The Reverend Gaulter Rose Holland Isaac Moraes-Lobo de Mello. For services to the Community of Reconciliation and Fellowship, Hackney, London.
- Rose Lilian, Mrs Dean. For services to Deaf People in Bexley, Kent.
- Robert Alan Deeming. For charitable services in Tyne and Wear.
- Miss Alison Deering. For services to the community in Haversham, Buckinghamshire.
- Jennifer, Mrs Dennis, Headteacher, Garboldisham Primary School, Norfolk. For services to Education.
- Miss Rosemary Devine. Higher Executive Officer, House of Lords.
- Lawrence Dewar, Chief Executive, Scottish Grocers' Federation. For services to the Grocery Trade.
- Gurdip Singh Dhillon, Member and former Mayor, London Borough of Greenwich. For services to Local Government.
- Eric Stanley Dixon. For services to the community in Kirklees, West Yorkshire.
- Gordon Bowes Dixon, Governor 4, H.M. Prison Winchester.
- Margaret, Mrs Dixon. For services to the British Red Cross Society in Greater Manchester.
- Rita Agnes, Mrs Dixon. For services to the Lincolnshire Agricultural Society.
- Norman Dodson. For services to the community in Grantham, Lincolnshire.
- Valerie Lyn, Mrs Doodson, Higher Scientific Officer, Proudman Oceanographic Laboratory. For services to Science.
- Esther, Mrs Dowling. For public service.
- Miss Hilary Brenda Drury. For public service.
- Angela, Mrs Dunbar, Non-executive Director, North Ayrshire and Arran NHS Trust. For services to Health Care.
- David McGechie Duncan, lately General Medical Practitioner, Wellingborough, Northamptonshire. For services to Medicine.
- Olwyn, Mrs Duncan. For political service.
- Edna Florence, Mrs Dunn, Support Manager 2, H.M. Treasury.
- Jack John Dunn. For services to the Church Lads and Church Girls Brigade in Bootle, Merseyside.
- Miss Maureen Jane Dupuch. For services to the Institute of Arable Crops Research.
- John Kenneth Bloomfield Durrant. For services to the community in Newton St Cyres, Devon.
- Audrey Patricia, Mrs Earp. For services to Elderly People in Bushey, Watford, Hertfordshire.
- Kenneth John Edwards, Executive Officer, Welsh Office.
- Walter C. Edwards. For services to the community in the Isle of Wight.
- Carole Frances, Mrs Eley For services to the Naval Personnel and Family Services, Portsmouth.
- Arthur Henry Albert Elliott. For services to the Norfolk Zipper Club.
- Norman Elliott, lately Railway Chargeman, Stowmarket Station, Anglia Railways, British Railways. For services to the Railway Industry.
- Phyllis Mary, Mrs Ellis. For services to Nature Conservation in Norfolk.
- Marjorie Emily, Mrs Elphick, chairwoman, Eastbourne and Hailsham Police Court Mission. For services to Prisoner Welfare.
- Dennis John Emes. For services to the Royal Air Forces Association in Europe and Christchurch, Dorset.
- Barry Edward Evans, lately Chief Inspector, West Midlands Police. For services to the Police.
- David Gwili Evans, Clerk, Llanddarog Community Council. For services to Local Government in Carmarthenshire.
- Ieuan Cenydd Evans. For services to Rugby Union Football.
- Marion Alma, Mrs Eveleigh. For services to the community and to Local History in the Vale of Glamorgan.
- Keith Arthur Fakes. For services to the community, particularly Scouting in Brighton, East Sussex.
- Eric Farr. For services to Sport in Grampian.
- Derek James Fawcett. For charitable services to the community in Hampshire.
- Harold Fearn, Shoe Repairer, Remploy. For charitable services in Derbyshire.
- David Stuart Ballingall Fellowes, Voluntary Observer Meteorological Office, Nottinghamshire.
- Teresa Ann, Mrs Felton, Founder and Administrator, Community Shop Trust, Leeds. For services to the community.
- Edward James Ferris. For services to the British Limbless Ex-Service Men's Association in Buckinghamshire.
- Jeanette, Sylvia, Mrs Fiore. For services to the Citizen's Advice Bureau. Portsmouth, Hampshire.
- Peter Fishbourne. For services to the War Pensions Committee, Borders and Lothian.
- Miss Monica Chloe Ruth Fisher, Clinical Specialist (Infant Feeding), John Radcliffe Hospital, Oxford. For services to Health Care.
- Reginald Alan Flegg, Member, London Borough of Merton. For services to Local Government.
- Margaret, Mrs Flett. For services to Guiding in Orkney.
- Alexander Flinder. For services to the Advisory Committee on Historic Wreck Sites.
- Lilian Joyce, Mrs Ford. For services to the community in Torbay, Devon.
- Audrey Mavis, Mrs Forster, County President, Lancashire North West Guides Association. For services to Guiding.
- Michael Forsyth, lately Higher Executive Officer, Department for Education and Employment.
- Joyce, Mrs Fowles, Co-ordinator, Woking Victim Support. For services to the community in Surrey.
- George Fraser, Columnist, Aberdeen Press and Journal. For services to Journalism.
- Moses Monty Fresco. For services to Photographic Journalism.
- Richard Clive Frost. For services to the King's Royal Rifle Corps Association.
- Miss Margaret Mary Gallagher. For services to the Community.
- Jennifer Ruth, Lady Galsworthy. For services to Health Care and to the community in Cornwall.
- Alan Garner, Leading Ganger, Forestry Commission.
- Pamela Rosemary, Mrs Garrad. For services to Nature Conservation in Essex.
- Irene Gaynor, Mrs Garwood. For services to the Citizen's Advice Bureau, Barry, South Glamorgan.
- Pamela, Mrs Gelder, Unit Manager, Park View Elderly Person's Home, Lincoln. For services to Elderly People.
- Miss Margaret Isabel Gibb, Fire Control Officer, Tayside Fire Brigade. For services to the Fire Service.
- John Joseph Leslie Gilbert. For services to Bell Ringing in Handsworth, South Yorkshire.
- Alan Thomas Gilling, Senior Executive Officer, Ministry of Defence.
- Linda Ann, Mrs Gittins. For services to Music in Wales.
- Hazel Margaret, Mrs Glaister. For services to the community in Southrepps, Norfolk.
- Richard George Neil Godefroy. For services to Forestry in Wales.
- Jean Ann, Mrs Gordon, Administrative Officer, Ministry of Defence.
- Adam Giles Grant, Farm Grieve. For services to Agriculture in Aberdeenshire.
- Thomas Brinley Gravell. For services to the community in Kidwelly (Cydweli) and to the Patagonian Welsh Society.
- Irene, Mrs Graven, Senior Personal Secretary, Department of Social Security.
- Duncan MacMillan Gray, chairman, Wishaw Victim Support Scheme. For services to Victim Support in Lanarkshire.
- Edwin Green. For services to the community in Potters Bar, Hertfordshire.
- Walter Ernest Green. For services to the Salvation Army and to the Community in Norwich, Norfolk.
- Miss Susan Greig. For services to the community in Salisbury, Wiltshire.
- Miss Rosalind Grender. For political service.
- Frank Colin Gribble. For services to Nature Conservation.
- Hilda May, Mrs Griffin, Gardener, Mompesson House, Wiltshire. For services to the National Trust.
- John Brian Griffiths, Conservation, Recreation and Heritage Forester, Forestry Commission.
- Gerald George Grimmond, General Manager, Camberwell Rehabilitation Association Workshop. For services to Mentally Ill People.
- John Grimshaw, Director and Chief Engineer, Sustrans Ltd. For services to Cycling, Sustainable Transport and to the Environment.
- Helen Mary, Mrs Guild. For services to Child Care and to Community Development in Scotland.
- Desmond Eric Gunner. For services to Agriculture and to Conservation.
- Margaret, Mrs Hales. For political service.
- Sheila Buchanan, Mrs Halley, Manager, Dixon Community Halls Day Centre, Glasgow. For services to Elderly People.
- Miss Joyce Clayton Hamer, Deputy Headteacher, Newtown High School, Powys. For services to Education.
- Miss Eldora Horton Hamlett, Nursing Auxiliary, Cheshire Community Healthcare Trust. For services to Health Care.
- Helen Gordon, Mrs Hardie, Auxiliary Coastguard, H.M. Coastguard, Forth Maritime Rescue Sub Centre. For services to Safety at Sea.
- Raymond Bertram Harding, Neighbourhood Watch Area Co-ordinator, Essex Police. For services to Crime Prevention.
- Edna Mabel, Mrs Harknett, lately Member, Holderness Borough Council. For services to Local Government.
- Peter James Amis Harper, Member, Airworthiness Requirements Board and chairman, Operations Advisory Committee, Civil Aviation Authority. For services to Aviation.
- Miss Andrea Harris, lately Local Officer 2, Department of Social Security.
- John Eric Harris, Founder, Helene Harris Memorial Trust. For services to Cancer Research.
- Peter Joseph Harris, Executive Officer, Lord Chancellor's Department.
- Elizabeth Marie, Mrs Lucas Harrison. For services to the Royal Air Forces Escaping Society.
- Francis John Harrison, Headteacher, Loddon Middle School, Norfolk. For services to Education.
- Martin Hartley, Resident Engineer/Manager, Balfpur Beatty Projects and Engineering Ltd. For services to Export.
- Robert Ian Harvey, Constable, Lancashire Constabulary. For services to the Police.
- Ann, Mrs Hatton. For services to the community in Norton Grange, Stockton on Tees, Cleveland.
- Geoffrey Havard. For services to the Tanglewood Social Club for People with Learning Disabilities, Harrow, Middlesex.
- Julie, Mrs Havard. For services to the Tanglewood Social Club for People with Learning Disabilities, Harrow, Middlesex.
- Captain George Hayes. For services to the Soldiers', Sailors' and Airmen's Families Association in Leicestershire.
- Roland Haythornthwaite. For services to the British Deaf Sports Council.
- Michael Gordon Heath, Project Co-ordinator, Bus Privatisation, London Buses Ltd. For services to Public Transport in London.
- Robert John Helleur, Manager, Business Support, Design and Build, British Telecommunications plc. For scientific services to the Telecommunications Industry.
- David Allan Henderson. For services to Industrial Health and Safety.
- Keith Henderson. For political service.
- Frances Margaret, Mrs Herd, Refectory Manageress, Elmwood College, Cupar, Fife. For services to Education.
- Richard Heyes, President, Central Lancashire Dial-a-Ride. For services to the Mobility of Disabled People.
- Roy Jack Hickman, Director, Woodrow High House, London Federation of Boys' Clubs. For services to Young People.
- Reginald Hignett. For services to the community in Tyldesley, Manchester.
- Judith, Mrs Hiller. For services to the British Diplomatic Spouses' Association.
- Olga Joan, Mrs Hobson. For services to the community in Maidenhead, Berkshire.
- Mark Graham Holder, Radio Operator. For humanitarian services in the former Yugoslavia.
- John Albert Holland, Secretary, National Advisory Panel, Advanced Drivers' Association, Royal Society for the Prevention of Accidents. For services to Road Safety.
- Peter Michael Holman, Q.P.M., Detective Sergeant, Metropolitan Police. For services to the Police.
- Lorna Gillian, Mrs Horner. For services to the community in Hargrave, Northamptonshire.
- Miss Diana Howard, Principal Librarian, Reference and Information Services, London Borough of Richmond upon Thames. For services to Librarianship.
- Group Captain Raymond Frederick George Howard, B.E.M. For services to the community in Essex.
- Ralph George Howes, Sub-Divisional Commandant, Special Constabulary. For services to the Police.
- William James Howie. For services to the Dairy Industry.
- Charles William Hudson. For services to the St John Ambulance Brigade in Sussex and to the Bluebell Railway.
- James Patrick Hughes, Welfare Officer, H.M. Board of Inland Revenue.
- Michael John Hughes, Higher Executive Officer, Overseas Development Administration.
- Vera, Mrs Hughes. For services to the Magistracy in Liverpool, Merseyside.
- Anne, Mrs Humphrey. For services to Elderly People in Newcastle upon Tyne, Tyne and Wear.
- Reginald Harold Humphreys, Driver, Trainload Freight, British Railways. For services to the Railway Industry.
- Doreen Stella, Mrs Humphries. For political and public service.
- Doreen, Mrs Hunt. For services to the Citizen's Advice Bureau, Yardley, West Midlands.
- William Hugh Huntley. For services to the Rotary Movement.
- Hannah Vera, Mrs Hutchinson. For charitable services in the Isle of Wight.
- Marie, Mrs Hynes. For services to the community in Macclesfield, Cheshire.
- Pamela, Mrs Ingham, Manager, Cornerstone. For services to the Buddie Road Estate, Benwell, Newcastle upon Tyne.
- Ellen Irene, Mrs Inwood. For services to the Mobility of Disabled People in Northamptonshire.
- James Glendower Irving, Voluntary Observer, Meteorological Office, Looe, Cornwall.
- Susan, Mrs Irving, Fire Control Officer, Lincolnshire Fire Brigade. For services to the Fire Service.
- Norman Gwyrosydd Perry James. For services to the St John Ambulance Brigade.
- Gladys, Mrs Janes, Founder and Organiser, Harrow Community Transport. For services to the Mobility of Disabled People.
- Anthony Lloyd Jefferis, Regional Estates Surveyor, Anglian Region, the Environment Agency. For services to the Water Industry.
- Moussa Jogee. For services to Race Relations in Scotland.
- David Reginald Careilw John. For services to Clwyd Deaf Children's Society.
- Miss Emma Louise Johnson, Clarinettist. For services to Music.
- Jean Barbara, Mrs Johnson. For services to the WRVS and to the community in Worcester.
- Miss Mary Louise Johnson, Higher Executive Officer, Department of Trade and Industry.
- William Johnson, Member, Bury Metropolitan Borough Council. For services to Local Government.
- Dennis Owen Jones, Regional Collector, H.M. Board of Inland Revenue.
- Gareth Jones, Project Manager, (BAJ Banwell), Meggitt Aerospace. For services to the Defence Industry.
- Gruffudd Hefin Jones, Leading Firefighter, North Wales Fire Service. For services to the Fire Service.
- Leonard Harry Jones. For services to the Royal British Legion in Suffolk.
- Keith Jordan, Assistant Director Technical Services, British Academy of Film and Television Arts. For services to the Film and Television Industries.
- Subhash Kantilal Joshi, Partner, Pannell Kerr Forster and chairman, Strathclyde Ethnic Minorities Business Forum. For services to Business and to Race Relations.
- Geoffrey Arthur Kaley, managing director, Computer Cab Company Ltd and chairman, Licensed Taxi Drivers' Association. For services to the Taxi Industry.
- Reuben Kandler. For services to the Far East (Prisoner of War and Internees) Fund.
- Arthur Keith Kendrew, Process and General Supervisory Grade C, Ministry of Defence.
- James Kennedy, Field Director, War Child, Mostar. For humanitarian services in the former Yugoslavia.
- Margaret Ann, Mrs Kennedy, Revenue Executive Officer, H.M. Board of Inland Revenue.
- Derek Kent, Sub Officer (Retained), Humberside Fire Brigade. For services to the Fire Service.
- Joanna, Mrs Kessler. For services to the community in London.
- Nigel John King. For services to Deaf People.
- Brian Knight, Site Manager, Willingdon Trees School, Eastbourne, East Sussex. For services to Education.
- Miss Sheila Knight, Administrative Officer, Ministry of Defence.
- Miss Beryl Elaine Knotts. For services to OXFAM.
- John Lackenby, Kielder Water Manager, Northumbrian Water. For services to the Water Industry.
- John Robert Lamb, Principal Orthotist and Manager, Tayside Orthotics Service. For services to the NHS in Scotland.
- Sandra Christine, Mrs Lancashire, Local Officer 2, Department of Social Security.
- David Bryan Laycock, Director, Computer Centre for People with Disabilities. For services to Education and to Disabled People.
- Sidney Lazarus, lately Forensic Medical Examiner, Metropolitan Police. For services to Forensic Medicine.
- Captain John Henry Le Page, Warden, Communicare Centre, St Brelade, Jersey. For services to the community.
- Miss Sarah Imelda Lees, Revenue Executive, H.M. Board of Inland Revenue.
- Thomas Leggate. For services to the Citizen's Advice Bureau in Bellshill, Scotland.
- John Leigh, lately Director (North), Commission for New Towns. For services to New Towns.
- Group Captain Brian John Leonard. For services to the War Pensions Committee, North West England.
- Peter Linfoot, Inspector of Construction, Health and Safety Executive. Department of the Environment.
- Brian Little. For services to Ornithological Research.
- Peter James Little, Senior Executive Officer, Department for Education and Employment.
- Margaret, Mrs Lowther, MPB5, Department for Education and Employment.
- Neil James Macdonald, General Medical Practitioner, Aviemore, Inverness-shire. For services to Medicine and to Mountain Rescue.
- Gary Preston Macfarlane, General Medical Practitioner, Kirkintilloch, Glasgow. For services to Medicine.
- Lachlan Robertson MacLeod, Constable, Strathclyde Police. For services to the Police and for humanitarian services in Romania.
- Jean, Mrs Machell. For services to the Cleveland Library Service and to the community in Cleveland.
- Major Dorothy Jill Machray, Retired Officer 2, Ministry of Defence.
- Beryl Patricia, Mrs Mackay. For services to the League of Friends, Shenley Hospital, Hertfordshire.
- Edna, Mrs Mackrill, Support Grade 2, Health and Safety Executive, Department of the Environment.
- Miss Christina Maclean. For services to Cancer Care in Scotland.
- Evelyn Margaret, Mrs Magee. For public service.
- Margretta Rita, Mrs Magowan. For public service.
- Tony F. C. Man. For services to the community in Croydon, Surrey.
- Myfanwy, Mrs Margetson. For services to the community, particularly Young People, in Cwmavon, Port Talbot.
- Kathleen, Mrs Marnoch. For services to the WRVS and to the Community in Kincardine and Deeside.
- Eileen Esther, Mrs Marshall. For services to the community in North London.
- Jessie, Mrs Marshall. For services to Blind People.
- Jean Margaret Burrington, Mrs Marwood. For political and public service.
- Brian Desmond Mawhinney For services to Scouting.
- Alan John Mayes, Support Grade 1, H.M. Board of Customs and Excise.
- Margaret Patricia, Mrs McCafferty, lately Administrative Assistant, Department for National Savings.
- Frank McCausland. For services to the community and to the Arts.
- John Michael McDiarmid, Vice Chairman, Red Deer Commission. For services to Agriculture.
- Janet Isobel, Mrs McDonagh. For services to the Hosplce Movement and to the community.
- James Gilbert McDowell. For services to Schools' Association Football.
- Thomas McFarlane. For services to Higher Education.
- Annie, Mrs McGrory. For services to St Anne's Primary School, Whitechapel, London.
- James Edward Hugh McIvor. For services to the Police.
- Pauline Taylor, Mrs McKeown, Programme Director, Marie Slopes International. For humanitarian services in the former Yugoslavia.
- John McLaughlin, managing director, Skylight International Ltd. For services to Industry and to the community in Renfrewshire.
- James McMillan, lately Member, Argyll and Bute District Council. For services to Local Government in Scotland.
- Rita, Mrs McMullan, lately Administrative Officer, Home Office.
- Anne, Mrs McNellan, managing director, Scottish Childminding Association. For services to Childminding.
- Colin Steele McRae. For services to Motor Rallying.
- James Fleming McRitchie. For charitable services to the Save the Children Fund and to the Scottish Motor Neurone Disease Association.
- Miss Marie McVeigh. For public service.
- Margaret, Mrs McVity, Senior Lecturer and Equal Opportunities Officer (Disability), Huddersfield Technical College. For services to Further Education and to Disabled People.
- Jeffrey Meeten, Account Investigation Adviser, Customer Service South Eastern Electricity plc. For services to the Electricity Industry.
- Robert Speirs Menzies, Workshop Manager, Beltane Products. For services to Disabled People in Lanarkshire.
- Patricia Winifred, Mrs Midgley. For services to the North End Trust, King's Lynn, Norfolk.
- Andrew Millar. For services to Talking Newspapers and to the National Federation of the Blind of the UK.
- Charles Miller. For public service.
- Charles Antony Miller, T.D. For services to the British Red Cross Society and to the community in Knutsford, Cheshire.
- David James Miller, Sector Officer, Coastguard Agency, South Pembrokeshire Sector, Department of Transport.
- Robert Singleton Miller, lately Leather Worker, Andrew Muirhead and Sons Ltd. For services to the Leather Industry.
- Maria Antonina, Mrs Miloszewska, lately Higher Executive Officer, Department for Education and Employment.
- Melvyn Barry Minshull, Principal Engineer, GEC Marconi. For services to the Defence Industry.
- Charles Robin Wingate Mitchell, lately Health and Safety Officer, Environmental Affairs, British Aggregate Construction Materials Industries. For services to the Construction Industry.
- Hubert Charles Weston Mitchell. For services to the British Limbless Ex-Service Men's Association in Bristol, Avon.
- James Mitchell, lately Coxswain, Kirkwall Lifeboat, RNLI. For services to Safety at Sea.
- William Reginald Mitchell. For services to Journalism and to the community in Yorkshire and Cumbria.
- Philip John Mobsby, Director, British Meat Manufactures' Association. For services to the Meat Industry.
- Jacqueline Lucette, Mrs Monbiot, Driver, Government Car Service, Department of the Environment.
- Hope Mary, Mrs Monks, School Crossing Patrol, Walthamstow, London. For services to Road Safety.
- Maureen, Mrs Montgomery. For services to the Chartered Surveying Profession.
- Christopher John Moon. For services to the Halo Trust.
- Eunice Dorothy, Mrs Moore. For services to Young People in Mold, Flintshire.
- Paul Moore, Constable, Nottinghamshire Constabulary. For services to the Police and to the Community.
- David John Elwyn Morgan. For services to the community in South East Wales.
- James Kingsley Morrison. For services to the community in Broughty Ferry, Dundee.
- Mary Bewick, Mrs Mossop. For services to the community in Chester-le-Street, Co Durham.
- Allan Mounsey, Clerical Officer, Site Construction, British Nuclear Fuels plc. For services to the Nuclear Industry.
- Gordon Alexander Murison, lately Senior Executive Officer, Department for National Savings.
- Peter Henry Ranee Munday, B.E.M., Higher Instructional Officer, Army School of Ammunition, Ministry of Defence.
- James Murdock. For services to the Police.
- Robert Joseph Murray, Prison Officer, H.M. Young Offenders' Institution Polmont.
- Alexander Donald Nelson, lately Vice Chairman, Wigtown District Council. For services to Local Government.
- Raymond Nethercott. For services to the Rehabilitation of Offenders.
- Muriel, Mrs Newman. For services to the community, particularly Elderly People, in Nettleham, Lincolnshire.
- Ronald Archer Newton. For services to the Soldiers' Sailors' and Airmen's Families Association in Co Durham.
- Bunty, Mrs Nicoll. For services to the community in Angus.
- David Jeune Nicolle. For political service.
- James Craig Nicolson, Inspector, Custody Services. Security Facilities Executive, Office of Public Service.
- Cyril George Noke. For services to the community in Cirencester, Gloucestershire.
- Roger Norman. For services to the community and to Journalism in South East England.
- Charles Arthur North, lately Rail Operator, North Dulwich Station, Network South Central, British Railways. For services to the Railway Industry.
- Marilyn, Mrs Noyes, Personal Secretary, Ministry of Defence.
- Patrick O'Connell. For services to the Royal Life Saving Society.
- Father Francis Aloysias O'Leary, Director, St Joseph's Hosplce Association-Josplce International. For services to the Hosplce Movement.
- Barbara Joyce, Mrs O'Shea, School Crossing Patrol, Wincham, Cheshire County Council. For services to Road Safety.
- Dennis William Ogborn. For services to the community.
- Joseph Henderson Oliver. For services to the Royal Air Forces Association in Melton Mowbray, Leicestershire.
- Catherine Joan, Mrs Ollis. For services to the WRVS in Ross on Wye, Herefordshire.
- Gordon Kaye Ollivere, Director and Chief Executive, Regional Technology Centre North. For services to Business in North East England.
- Norris Wallington Osborne. For services to the Berkshire Probation Service.
- Robert Overend. For services to Agriculture.
- Tommy Wyn Owen, Support Grade 2, Welsh Office.
- George William Page, lately Car Park Attendant, Norfolk and Norwich Healthcare Trust. For services to Health Care.
- Stephen Jeffrey Pailes, Constable, Warwickshire Constabulary. For services to the Police and to the Community.
- John Millar Palmer. For services to the Police.
- Bryant John Parker, Lock Keeper, Stoke Lock, Stoke Bardolph, Nottinghamshire. For services to British Waterways.
- Squadron Leader John Joseph Parker, RAF (Rtd), lately Retired Officer 2, Ministry of Defence.
- Ann, Mrs Parkin, Carer, Home Finding Scheme, Sheffield, South Yorkshire. For services to Disabled People.
- Horace Henzell Parkyn, chairman, Brownsea Island Voluntary Wardens Committee. For services to the National Trust.
- John Stephen Parrott. For charitable services in Merseyside.
- Edward Henry Parry, Chief Superintendent, Northamptonshire Police. For services to the Police.
- Anthony Fred Lewis Parsons. For services to National Federation of Retail Newsagents.
- Josephine Kathleen, Mrs Patmore. For services to the Royal College of Defence Studies.
- Devora Yaffa, Mrs Peake, President, Boxford Suffolk Farms. For services to the Fruit and Fruit Juice Industries.
- Ronald Stanley Springfield Pearson, lately chairman, Stockbury Parish Council, Sittingbourne, Kent. For services Local Government.
- Matthew Elliot Peat. For services to the Boys' Brigade in Coatbridge, Lanarkshire.
- Charles Edward Joseph Perea, Executive Officer, Ministry of Defence.
- Maurice Reginald Perratt. For services to the Submarine Old Comrades Association.
- John Trevor Perry, Member, Board of Visitors, H.M. Prison Featherstone. For services to Prisoner Welfare.
- Mary Patricia, Mrs Peterson, Key Keeper, Muness Castle. For services to Conservation in Shetland.
- Patricia, Mrs Phillips. For services to the British Academy.
- Ronald Frederick Phillips. For services to the Reading Cygnets Swimming Club, Berkshire.
- Joan Elizabeth, Mrs Pierce. For services to the WRVS and to the community in Wokingham, Berkshire.
- Graham Arthur Richard Piper, Typist, Department of Trade and Industry.
- Arthur Donald Pollard. For political and public service.
- William Edward Pollitt. For services to the Soldiers', Sailors' and Airmen's Families Association in Greater Manchester.
- Thomas Duncan Pollock. For services to the community.
- John Richard Pool. For charitable services in Bristol, Avon.
- Irene Maud, Mrs Pottinger. For services to the community in Muswell Hill, London.
- Anne Grigor, Mrs Powell. For services to the Save the Children Fund in Leicester.
- Edith, Mrs Powell. For political and public service.
- Thomas Ernest Eric Pratt. For services to Cricket in Wales.
- John Prestage, chairman, Executive Council, Institute of Plumbing. For services to Plumbing.
- William Georges Price, Senior Head Gardener, Commonwealth War Graves Commission.
- Margaret Laura, Mrs Pullen. For political service.
- Rennie William Purvis, Senior Executive Officer, Department of Social Security.
- Catherine, Mrs Quine, chair, National Federation of Estate Management Boards. For services to Urban Regeneration.
- Constance Kewin, Mrs Radcliffe. For services to the Cultural and Literary Heritage of the Isle of Man.
- Marjorie Mary, Mrs Rains, lately Personal Secretary, Department of Trade and Industry.
- Miss Susan Patricia Elizabeth Ramsay, Executive Officer, H.M. Board of Customs and Excise.
- Edward Ramsden, lately Director, Environmental Health Services, Swansea City Council. For services to Local Government in Wales.
- Diljit Rana. For services to Industry and to the community.
- Miss Margaret Ann Randall, Secretary, National Gallery Publications Ltd. For services to the National Gallery.
- Montague Raphael, Doctor, Remploy and formerly Sunelm. For services to Disabled People.
- Patricia Elizabeth, Mrs Rate. For services to the Royal Naval Association in Peterborough, Cambridgeshire.
- Linda, Mrs Reading, PBS, Department for Education and Employment.
- Nancy, Mrs Reay, Private Secretary, British Coal Corporation. For services to the Coal Industry.
- Archibald John Christopher Reger, lately Member, Chichester Harbour Conservancy. For services to the Environment.
- Miss Katherine Chelsea Renton, Programme Development Adviser, Marie Slopes International. For humanitarian services in the former Yugoslavia.
- Edwin Arnold Richards, Chief Engineer, AS90, VSEL. For services to the Defence Industry.
- Marianne Joan, Mrs Richards, Chief Executive, Port Talbot Co-operative Development Agency. For services to Small Businesses in Port Talbot.
- Ian Richardson. For services to the community in Laggan, Inverness-shire.
- Anne Elizabeth, Mrs Riding. For services to the Royal Air Forces Association in London.
- Marilyn, Mrs Rivers, Head, Grendon Church of England Primary School, Northamptonshire. For services to Education.
- Miss Gwyneth Parul Roberts. For services to the community in North Wales.
- Jean, Mrs Roberts, Prison Visitor, H.M. Young Offenders' Institution Feltham. For services to Prison Welfare.
- John Ian Roberts, Temporary Sub Officer, London Fire and Civil Defence Authority. For services to the Fire Service.
- William John Roberts. For services to the Anglesey Cancer Support Group.
- Miss Florence Jean Robertson, lately Assistant Secretary, Faculty of Public Health Medicine. For services to Public Health.
- Robert Robertson, Support Grade 2, Scottish Office.
- Olive Marjorie, Mrs Robinson. For political service.
- John William Robson, Chief Executive, Shildon and Sedgefield District Development Agency. For services to Business and to the community in Sedgefield District, County Durham.
- Jonathan Robson. For political service.
- Sheila Betty, Mrs Rogers. For services to the Multiple Sclerosis Society in Mansfield, Nottinghamshire.
- Terence George Rolf. For services to the Territorial, Auxiliary and Volunteer Reserve Association in the South of England.
- Elizabeth, Mrs Ross, Head Banqueting Waitress, Swallow Hotel, Seaburn, Sunderland. For services to Tourism.
- Janet, Mrs Ross. For services to Bannockburn Hospital, Stirling.
- Leslie Ross, Senior Presenter, BRMB, Birmingham. For services to Radio Broadcasting.
- Peter Owen Jeffrey Rowlands, Group Scout Leader, Brecon. For services to Young People.
- Rachel Annora, Mrs Rowlands. For services to Agriculture in Wales.
- Vera Elsie, Mrs Geddes-Ruffle. For political service.
- Pauline Albinia, Mrs Hamilton-Russell. For services to the Citizen's Advice Bureau, Covent Garden, London.
- Robert Charles (Jack) Russell. For services to Cricket.
- Wing Commander Robert Noel James Saker, R.A.F. (Rtd). For services to the Ministry of Defence.
- David Alfred Saunders, Museum Support Grade 1, National Army Museum.
- Robert Scott, Global Consultant, Engineering, British Petroleum Company Ltd. For services to the Oil Industry.
- Victor Selwyn. For services to The Salamander Oasis Trust.
- James Beggs Semple. For services to the Prison Service.
- Patricia Alice, Mrs Shardlow. For services to the community in Cheddington, Bedfordshire.
- Michael Thomas Sharman, lately Head of Consultancy, Department of Planning, Transportation and Economic Strategy, Warwickshire County Council. For services to Highway Maintenance.
- Duncan Frederic Shaw, Member, Council for English Nature and Member, Joint Nature Conservation Committee. For services to Nature Conservation.
- Joan, Mrs Shaw, Shop Manageress, Royal Society for the Protection of Birds. For services to the RSPB in Lochwinnoch, Renfrewshire.
- Caroline Margaret, Mrs Shearer. For services to the Employment Service in Ashington, Northumberland.
- Iftikhar Hassan Sheikh, Member Croydon Race Equality Council. For services to Race Relations in Surrey.
- Ann Mary, Mrs Sherwood, Manager, Portage Service, Wandsworth Local Education Authority. For services to Education.
- Christine Ann, Mrs Shewry, Administrative Officer, Ministry of Defence.
- John Short, Clinical Nurse Specialist, North Durham Acute Hospitals Trust. For services to Health Care.
- Dorothy, Mrs Sidaway, lately Sub Divisional Officer, South Yorkshire Police. For services to the Police.
- Miss Kathleen Sidebottom. For services to the Thornton Cleveleys Old People's Welfare Association, Lancashire.
- Francis William Simpson. For services to Nature Conservation in Suffolk.
- Joan, Mrs Simpson. For services to the community in Upton St Leonards, Gloucestershire.
- Thomas Simpson. For services to the British Talking Book Service for the Blind.
- Audrey Maud, Mrs Sinclair, lately Senior Personal Secretary, Ministry of Defence.
- Susan, Mrs Singerman. For services to the Understanding of the Holocaust.
- Geoffrey Smart, co-founder, Heart Link. For services to Parents of Children with Heart Disease.
- Anthony Glen Smith, lately Aid Logistician. For humanitarian services in the former Yugoslavia.
- Elizabeth, Mrs Smith. For services to Murroes Primary School, Duntrune, Dundee.
- Eric Hedley Smith, chairman, Filton Parish Council and Life President, Filton Town Twinning Association. For services to Local Government and to Town Twinning.
- Geoffrey Donald Smith, lately Pattern Maker and Joiner. For services to the Museum of Science and Industry, Manchester.
- Miss Olive Hedley-Smith. For services to the Carers National Association and to the community in Torquay, Devon.
- Patricia Ellen Anne, Mrs Smith. For services to the Soldiers' Widows and Widowers and Single Soldiers' Dependants Funds.
- Percy Roger Smith, Divisional Officer, Gwent Special Constabulary. For services to the Police.
- Philip Charles Pendrell Smith. For services to Royal National Institute for the Blind.
- Robina, Mrs Smith. For services to the community in Arnside, Cumbria.
- Sybil Mavis, Mrs Snelling. For services to the NSPCC in the Isle of Wight.
- Miss Muriel Ann Sorbie, lately Higher Executive Officer, Scottish Office.
- Neville Southall. For services to Association Football.
- Alec John Spalding. For services to Scouting in Glasgow.
- Pearl Marie, Mrs Sperring, lately PBS, Department for Education and Employment.
- Miss Pamela Marian Spofforth, Founder and President, Pro Corda. For services to music for young String players.
- Roy Orland Charles Spring. For services to Salisbury Cathedral.
- Peter Leslie Steer. For services to Ostomy Patient Care.
- Harry Michael Steere, Sub Officer (Retained), Cleveland Fire Brigade. For services to the Fire Service.
- William Stein. For services to Swimming.
- Silbourne Howard Stephenson. For services to the community in Bedfordshire.
- Miss Patricia Agnes Storey, Senior Personal Secretary, Department of Social Security.
- Miss Tina Wendy Stowell, lately Senior Personal Secretary, Cabinet Office.
- Jamnadas Virji Sudra, Sub-Postmaster, Chislehurst, Kent. For services to the Post Office and to the community.
- Miss Peggy Kate Suffield. For services to the community in Wythall, Birmingham.
- Edgar Robert Swinger. For services to the London Pensions Fund Authority.
- Helen Elizabeth, Mrs Sword, Trustee, Housing Association for Officers' Families. For services to Ex-Servicemen and Women.
- Kenneth William Syyret. For charitable services in Jersey.
- Muriel, Mrs Tabb. For services to Music in St Austell, Cornwall.
- Jillian Valerie, Mrs Tallon. For services to The Compassionate Friends.
- Michael Tanner, Manager, Metal Finishing Flight Refuelling Ltd. For services to Materials Technology.
- Margaret Jane, Mrs Thom, lately Home Care Organiser, Social Work Department, Banff and Buchan Division, Grampian Regional Council Social Work Department. For services to the Community.
- John Rowland Thomas. For services to the community in North East Powys.
- William Thomas, Emergency Logistician. For humanitarian services in the former Yugoslavia.
- David Bernard Thompson, T.D. For services to the community in Canterbury, Kent.
- Ernest Thompson. For services to People with Learning Disabilities and to Nursing.
- Margery Jean, Mrs Thomson. For political and public service.
- Alan Woodburn Thornton, managing director, Thor Ceramics. For services to the Ceramics Industry.
- Charles Thornton. For services to the Guild of Technical Dyers and Dyework and to the Dyeing Industry.
- Margaret, Mrs Tierney, Support Manager 3, Ministry of Defence.
- John Henry Timms, Technical Officer, Preston and Mall Residents Association. For services to the community in Middlesex.
- Frances Alice, Mrs Tolhurst, Youth Worker, Rye Boys Club, East Sussex. For services to Young People.
- Alan Toogood, Personnel Manager, Lucas Automotive Ltd. For services to Engineering Education and Training.
- Samuel Robert Torrance. For services to Golf.
- William John Alexander Tosh, Range Warden, Ministry of Defence.
- James Tough, Senior Caretaker, Angus College, Arbroath. For services to Education.
- Jack Tripp, Actor. For services to Pantomime.
- Albert Frederick Truelove. For services to the community in Trumpington, Cambridgeshire.
- Myra Shortreed, Mrs Turnbull, lately chairman, Roxburgh District Council. For services to the community and to Local Government.
- Cyril Crosbie Turner. For services to the community in Ludford, Lincolnshire.
- Miss Margery Kay Turvey, lately Principal Occupational Health Nursing Adviser, Occupational Health and Safety Agency, Office of Public Service.
- Patricia, Mrs Tyler. For services to the John Boag Probation and Bail Hostel, Norwich, Norfolk.
- David Leslie Tyrrell, Senior Executive Officer, Ministry of Agriculture, Fisheries and Food.
- Colin Urquhart, Cemetery Superintendent and Grounds Maintenance Supervisor, Argyll and Bute District Council. For services to the Community.
- Vivienne, Mrs Vertefeuille, Personal Assistant and Translator, Ministry of Defence.
- John Ernest Vickery, lately Sergeant, Avon and Somerset Constabulary. For services to the Police.
- Alan Voutt, Quarry Foreman, Northern Aggregates Ltd. For services to the Construction Industry.
- Anthony Alfred Walker. For services to Stonemasonry in Oxford.
- Judith Mary, Mrs Walker. For services to Riding for People with Disabilities.
- Gloria Teresa, Mrs Wallis. For political and public service.
- John Kenneth Walls. For services to Young People.
- Robert Seddon Walmsley, Director, Chapeltown and Harehills Enterprises Ltd. For services to Urban Regeneration.
- Joyce, Mrs Walsby, Financial Accounting Manager, Ordnance Survey.
- Mary Angela, Mrs Ward, artistic director, Chicken Shed Theatre Trust. For services to the Arts.
- Colin Thomas Warwick, chairman, Northumberland Sea Fisheries Committee. For services to the Fishing Industry.
- John Waters. For services to the HMS Liverpool Association.
- David Waterson, Leader, Salford Lads' Club, Greater Manchester. For services to Young People.
- Miss Susan Mary Wates. For services to Child Care and to the community in London.
- Paul Watson, Director, Bristol Cyrenians. For services to Homeless People.
- Stewart Watson, Brass Instructor and Brass Band Conductor, Aberdeen. For services to Music.
- Alan Stewart Watt. For services to the community.
- Miss Beryl May Jago Webb, chairman, Ashingdon Parish Council, Essex. For services to Road Safety and to the community.
- Colin David Webb, lately Delivery Manager, Royal Mail Anglia, Post Office. For services to the Post Office and to the community in Chelmsford, Essex.
- Michael Huyshe Webber, executive director, Tinsley Bridge Ltd. For services to the Motor Industry.
- Philip Welsh, lately chairman, West Whitelawburn Housing Co-operative and Member, New Gorbals Housing Association. For services to the Housing Association Movement in Scotland.
- Joy, Mrs West. For services to the War Widows' Association of Great Britain.
- Terence John Weston, lately Director of Finance, Ceredigion District Council. For services to Local Government in Wales.
- Michael John White, Firefighter, Devon Fire and Rescue Service. For services to the Fire Service.
- Morag Mary, Mrs White. For political and public service.
- Thomas Patrick White. For services to the Construction Industry.
- Keith Robert Whitesides. For services to the community in the East Midlands.
- Norma, Mrs Whittaker. For services to the community in Oldham, Lancashire.
- Jean Marion, Mrs Whittall, Administrative Officer, Ministry of Defence.
- Mary, Mrs Wilkins. For services to the community in Highley, Shropshire.
- Frank Willcock, Constable, Greater Manchester Police. For services to the Police and for charitable services.
- Keith Edward Dare-Williams, Auxiliary Coastguard in Charge, H.M. Coastguard, Plymouth, Devon. For services to Safety at Sea.
- Thomas John Williams, lately chairman, Council of Welsh Districts. For services to Local Government in Wales.
- George Robert Thomas Willis, D.F.C., Non-Executive Director, Business Link in Barnsley and Doncaster. For services to Training.
- Cecil Edward Austin Willson. For services to the Fleet Air Arm.
- Arthur John Wilmot, Senior Road Safety Officer, Leicestershire County Council. For services to Road Safety.
- Miss Maureen Elizabeth Wilsher, Support Grade 1, Ministry of Defence.
- Hugh D. Wilson. For services to Rural and Agricultural Workers in Scotland.
- Ronald Wilson. For services to the community in Yorkshire.
- John Wesley Wilton. For services to the community in Harrowbarrow, Cornwall.
- Geoffrey George Winkworth, Assistant Chief Officer, Fire Service College. For services to the Fire Service.
- San Wong. For services to Industry and to the community.
- David John Wood, Operations Standard Manager, Midlands Zone, Railtrack. For services to the Railway Industry.
- Professor William Gordon Wood. For services to the Cricklade Music Festival, Wiltshire.
- Ann, Mrs Woodcock, Supervisor, Clepington Playgroup, Dundee. For services to Race Relations in Dundee.
- Kathleen Mary, Mrs Woodhead, lately Higher Executive Officer, Department of Health.
- Timothy Edward James Wren, Prison Officer, H.M. Prison Featherstone.
- Eileen Lily, Mrs Wright. For political and public service.
- Rosina, Mrs Wybrow For services to Sir Thomas Abney Primary School, Hackney, London.
- Gloria, Mrs Yates. For services to the community in Ely, Cardiff.
- Maureen, Mrs Yeowell, Adviser to BUPA and National Mammography Trainer, BUPA Health Screening Centre, London. For services to Health Care.
- Peter Michael Young, lately Professional and Technology, Officer, Transport Research Laboratory Executive Agency, Department of Transport.
- Rena Violet Douglas, Mrs Young, lately Senior Personal Secretary, Scottish Office.
- Irene, Mrs Younge. For services to Nursing.
- Peggy Enid Margaret, Mrs Appiah. For services to UK/Ghanaian relations and community welfare.
- Au Yeung Man-tak. For services to vocational training, Hong Kong.
- Richard James Austen, Deputy High Commissioner, Banjul.
- Christopher John Bale. For services to charity, Hong Kong.
- John Neville Broomfield, C.P.M. For services to police training, Hong Kong.
- Anthony Jonathan Buckby, Director, British Council, Bologna.
- Anthony George Chan Shing-kee. For public service, Hong Kong.
- Simon Cohen, Honorary Consul, Guadalajara, Mexico.
- Robin Victor Davies, Member, locally engaged staff, H.M. Embassy, Paris.
- Sheila, Mrs Douglas. For services to the community in Périgueux and the Dordogne.
- Irvin Bruce Eldemire, District Officer, Little Cayman, Cayman Islands.
- Michael Stanley Nicholas Farlie. For services to shipping interests in Hong Kong.
- Mary Charteris Love, Mrs Fraser. For services to primary education in Swaziland.
- Ian Percy Gale, Chief Security Officer, H.M. Embassy, Manila.
- Ian Bennett Gibson, Honorary Consul, Kiel, Germany.
- Terence Ginty. For services to British commercial interests in China.
- Ann Smith, Mrs Gordon. For charitable services to the community, Bermuda.
- Monica Marina, Mrs Gore. For voluntary welfare and charitable services in the Cayman Islands.
- Peter Norman Graham. For services to the Independent Commission against Corruption, Hong Kong.
- Joan, Mrs Borello Hansen, locally engaged Commercial Assistant, H.M. Embassy, Copenhagen.
- Brian Walter Hicks. For services to the community and British commercial interests in Bahrain.
- Ho Kwok-fong. For public service in Hong Kong.
- Peter Ho Wing-ko. For services to culture and to community welfare, Hong Kong.
- Elizabeth, Mrs Howard. For services to the British Embassy School, Athens.
- Victor Hut Chun-fui. For services to youth recreation and social work in Hong Kong.
- Nell Dorothea, Mrs Johnston. For voluntary service to the community, Bermuda.
- Miss Margaret Nora Knill. For services to the blind in Afghanistan.
- Ko Tam-kan. For voluntary community service, Hong Kong.
- Jeffrey Lam King-fung. For services to industry, Hong Kong.
- Richard William Evan Law. For services to UK-Italian cultural relations, Florence.
- Edward Law Wing-tak. For public service, Hong Kong.
- Joseph Lee Man-kong, J.P., Deputy Commissioner for Census and Statistics, Hong Kong.
- Miss Sabina Leung Fuk-tai. For services to the mentally handicapped, Hong Kong.
- Michael Philip Linde. For services to the British community in Switzerland.
- Helen, Mrs Luk Tuet Siu-wah. For public service, Hong Kong.
- Farley Ma Man-chiu. For services to recreation and amenities, Hong Kong.
- William John McClelland. For services to student exchanges with Canada.
- Marion Calder, Mrs Orr, locally engaged Vice-Consul, Durban.
- Lystra, Mrs Osborne. For services to the Red Cross, Montserrat.
- Miss Artemisia Panayiotou. For services to British commercial interests in Cyprus.
- Barbara Helen, Mrs Parker, locally engaged Personal Assistant, H.M. Consulate-General, San Francisco.
- James Phillip Peralta. For services to commercial enterprise and the community in Gibraltar.
- George Zbigniew Podolecki, Honorary Consul, Maracaibo, Venezuela.
- Poon Kam-kwong. For voluntary community service, Hong Kong.
- Matthew Prouten, lately of H.M. Embassy, Tokyo.
- Graham Wightman Reid. For services to education and literature, Macedonia.
- Margaret, Mrs Reid. For services to education and literature, Macedonia.
- Graeme Neville Robinson, Honorary Consul, Christchurch.
- John Augustus Alvarez Louis Charles Rodigas. For services to the British community in Nice.
- John Crute Rogers. For services to the community and to British business interests in Windhoek.
- David John Rowson. For services to English language teaching in Tbilisi, Georgia.
- Audrey, Mrs Rummeli. For services to charity in Ankara.
- Richard Walter Scott. For services to British and other war veterans in Cameroon.
- Hannelore Margarethe, Mrs Staples, locally engaged Assistant Management Officer, H.M. Consulate-General, Frankfurt.
- Timothy David Stew, lately Third Secretary, H.M. Embassy, Sarajevo.
- Daphne Lucille, Mrs Taylor. For services to the expatriate community in Seoul.
- Thomas Temple. For voluntary services to charity, Belgium.
- Kenneth Wang Kuk-kei. For services to manufacturing industry, Hong Kong.
- Richard Webb, Staff Officer to the Governor, Montserrat.
- Carrie, Mrs Willis Yau Sheung-mui, Chief Electoral Officer, Hong Kong.
- Raymond Wong Siu-keung. For public service, Hong Kong.
- Yip Wah, J.P. For services to the community in Hong Kong.

=== Royal Red Cross ===
==== Member of the Royal Red Cross (RRC) ====
- Major Rosemary Helen Banford, Queen Alexandra's Royal Army Nursing Corps.

==== Associate of the Royal Red Cross (ARRC) ====
- Lieutenant Robert Thomas Griffin, Queen Alexandra's Royal Naval Nursing Service.
- Acting Chief Petty Officer Enrolled Nurse (General) Rosemary Louise Webb, Queen Alexandra's Royal Naval Nursing Service.
- Captain Neil Thompson Frazer, Queen Alexandra's Royal Army Nursing Corps.
- Staff Sergeant Caroline Russell, Queen Alexandra's Royal Army Nursing Corps.
- Squadron Leader Janice Oakman, Princess Mary's Royal Air Force Nursing Service (Retired).

=== Queen's Police Medal for Distinguished Service (QPM) ===
England and Wales

- John William Bennett, Detective Superintendent, Gloucestershire Constabulary.
- John Noel Blackburn, Detective Chief Superintendent, Kent Constabulary.
- Allan Charlesworth, Assistant Chief Constable (designate), Humberside Police.
- Pauline Ann, Mrs Clare, Chief Constable, Lancashire Constabulary.
- Peter John Coles, Detective Superintendent, Nottinghamshire Constabulary.
- John Charles Essery, Detective Chief Superintendent, Devon and Cornwall Constabulary.
- Malcolm Forster, Detective Constable, South Yorkshire Police.
- Raymond Kenneth Hall, Constable, Metropolitan Police.
- John Patterson Hamilton, Deputy Director General, National Criminal Intelligence Service.
- Peter Harris, Chief Superintendent, Greater Manchester Police.
- Peter Hermitage, H.M. Assistant Inspector of Constabulary.
- Paul Andrew Manning, Assistant Commissioner, Metropolitan Police.
- William George Nelson, Assistant Chief Constable (designate), Hampshire Constabulary.
- Anthony Leslie Rowe, Commander, Metropolitan Police.
- Frederick John Smith, Chief Superintendent, Sussex Police.
- John Townsend, Commander, Metropolitan Police.
- David Tucker, Commander, Metropolitan Police.
- Jack Wilson, Chief Superintendent, Cumbria Constabulary.

Northern Ireland

- William Frederick Reginald Welch Semple, Chief Inspector, Royal Ulster Constabulary.

Overseas

- Justin Cunningham, Chief Superintendent, Royal Hong Kong Police.
- Angus John Delano Stevenson-Hamilton, Assistant Commissioner, Royal Hong Kong Police.
- Vernon Elroy Malone, Commissioner of Police, British Virgin Islands.

Scotland

- James Gilchrist, Chief Superintendent, Dumfries and Galloway Constabulary.
- John Crispian Strachan, Assistant Chief Constable, Strathclyde Police.

=== Queen's Fire Service Medal for Distinguished Service (QFSM) ===
England And Wales

- Peter John Coombs, Deputy Chief Fire Officer, Kent Fire Brigade.
- Brian Anthony Higton, Temporary Assistant Divisional Officer, Derbyshire Fire Service.
- Miss Margaret Jean Penton, Principal Fire Control Officer, West Midlands Fire Service.
- Valerie Ann, Mrs Pluck, Principal Fire Control Officer, Essex Fire Service.
- Andrew John Walters, Chief Fire Officer, Avon Fire Brigade.

Overseas

- Hsu King-ping, Chief Fire Officer, Royal Hong Kong Fire Service.

Scotland

- James Coyle, Assistant Firemaster, Strathclyde Fire Brigade.
- Colin Cranston, Firemaster, Lothian and Borders Fire Brigade.

=== Colonial Police and Fire Service Medal for Meritorious Service (CPM) ===
- Chan Ping-chiu, Station Sergeant, Royal Hong Kong Police Force.
- Cheung Tak-yiu, Chief Inspector, Royal Hong Kong Police Force.
- Iain Charles Grant, Chief Superintendent, Royal Hong Kong Police Force.
- Francis Edwin Hillier, Senior Superintendent, Royal Hong Kong Police Force.
- Lai Yuen-wing, Superintendent, Royal Hong Kong Police Force.
- Lam Chi-ning, Chief Inspector, Royal Hong Kong Police Force.
- Lee Kee-cheung, Principal Fireman, Hong Kong Fire Service.
- Lee Siu-kin, Senior Superintendent, Royal Hong Kong Police Force.
- Leung Sai-kan, Station Sergeant, Royal Hong Kong Police Force.
- Leung Sheung Man, Station Sergeant, Royal Hong Kong Police Force.
- Ian Robert Mackness, Senior Superintendent, Royal Hong Kong Police Force.
- Charles William Mitchell, Superintendent, Royal Hong Kong Police Force.
- Ng Chi-keung, Station Sergeant, Royal Hong Kong Police Force.
- Rodney John Starling, Superintendent, Royal Hong Kong Police Force.
- John McPhail Thomson, Senior Superintendent, Royal Hong Kong Police Force.
- Colin Frederick Thornborrow, Superintendent, Royal Hong Kong Police Force.
- Tsang Kwong-kwai, Senior Divisional Officer, Hong Kong Fire Service.
- Tse Yee-sum, Senior Superintendent (Auxiliary), Royal Hong Kong Auxiliary Police Force.
- Wong Long, Station Sergeant, Royal Hong Kong Police Force.
- Stuart Wringe, Senior Superintendent, Royal Hong Kong Police Force.
- Yu Shi-cheung, Chief Inspector, Royal Hong Kong Police Force.
- Wu Kang-fuk, Station Sergeant, Royal Hong Kong Police Force.
- Yu Ah-chu, Principal Fireman, Hong Kong Fire Service.
- John Yuen Ying-lam, Chief Superintendent, Royal Police Force.
- Buel Rolphie Braggs, Chief Superintendent, Royal Cayman Islands Police Force.

== Barbados ==
=== The Most Distinguished Order of Saint Michael and Saint George ===
==== Knight Commander of the Order of St Michael and St George (KCMG) ====
- The Honourable John Stanley Bruce Dear, C.H.B. For services to the legal profession and to charity.

=== The Most Excellent Order of the British Empire ===
==== Commander of the Order of the British Empire (CBE) ====
- George Eustace Theodore Brancker. For services to Parliament.

==== Member of the Order of the British Empire (MBE) ====
- Nell Alwyn, Mrs. Wycherley. For services to operatic music.

== Bahamas ==
=== Knight Bachelor ===
- Durward Randolph Knowles, O.B.E. For services to the community and to sport, particularly sailing.

=== The Most Distinguished Order of Saint Michael and Saint George ===
==== Knight Commander of the Order of St Michael and St George (KCMG) ====
- The Honourable Arlington Griffith Butler. For services to the social, political, sporting and educational life of the country.

==== Companion of the Order of St Michael and St George (CMG) ====
- Ruth Rosalie, Mrs. Millar. For public service.
- Basil Godwin O'Brien. For public service.

=== The Most Excellent Order of the British Empire ===
==== Commander of the Order of the British Empire (CBE) ====
- Conrad Joseph Knowles. For public services.

==== Officer of the Order of the British Empire (OBE) ====
- Commodore Leon Livingstone Smith. For public service, particularly to the Royal Bahamas Defence Force.

==== Member of the Order of the British Empire (MBE) ====
- The Reverend Hands Bain. For services to the community.
- Vincent Lloyd Ferguson. For services to education.

=== British Empire Medal (BEM) ===
- Captain Alphonso Ralph Bowe. for services to the community, particularly Long Island.
- The Reverend Bertram Newton. For services to the community.

== Grenada ==
=== The Most Excellent Order of the British Empire ===
==== Member of the Order of the British Empire (MBE) ====
- Thompson Cedric Crosby. For services to education and the community.
- Michael Bernard Noel. For services to agriculture (particularly to the banana industry) and to the community.

== Papua New Guinea ==
=== The Most Distinguished Order of Saint Michael and Saint George ===
==== Companion of the Order of St Michael and St George (CMG) ====
- Misty Baloiloi. For services to the private sector and the University of Papua New Guinea.

=== The Most Excellent Order of the British Empire ===
==== Knight Commander of the Order of the British Empire (KBE) ====
- The Most Reverend Bishop Desmond Charles Moore. For services to religion and the community.

==== Commander of the Order of the British Empire (CBE) ====
- Joseph Bae. For services to business and the copra industry.
- Natanais Marum. For public service.

==== Officer of the Order of the British Empire (OBE) ====
- Susan, Mrs. Karike. For services in designing the Papua New Guinea national flag.
- Otto Malatana. For services to broadcasting and the community.
- Roger Tongai Palme. For services to banking and the community.
- Chief Superintendent Denis Charles Samin. For services to the Royal Papua New Guinea Constabulary and the community.
- Peter Tsiamalili. For public service.
- Mary, Mrs. Umpao. For public service and services to business, the community, charity and women's affairs.

==== Member of the Order of the British Empire (MBE) ====
- John Kowan Akau. For public and community services.
- Kevin Bernard. For services to Government House and to the Government.
- Chief Inspector John Bonot. For services to the Royal Papua New Guinea Constabulary.
- Pastor Andrew Kauga. For services to the Church and the community.
- Sinclare Solomon. For services to journalism.

=== Companion of the Imperial Service Order (ISO) ===
- Aku Kere. For public service.

=== British Empire Medal (BEM) ===
- Posi, Mrs Boe. For services to the Police.
- John Torea Erekofa. For services to the community.
- Yapi Ropa. For services to the community.
- Deneng Kana Sam. For services to the Police Department.

=== Queen's Police Medal (QPM) ===
- Superintendent Peter Aigilo, Royal Papua New Guinea Constabulary.

=== Queen's Fire Service Medal (QFSM) ===
- Fireman Grade 3 Jack Matana, Papua New Guinea Fire Service.
- Fireman Grade 3 Billson Tesasi, Papua New Guinea Fire Service.

== Solomon Islands ==
=== The Most Distinguished Order of Saint Michael and Saint George ===
==== Companion of the Order of St Michael and St George (CMG) ====
- Frank Ofagioro Kabui, O.B.E. For services in the legal field.

=== The Most Excellent Order of the British Empire ===
==== Knight Commander of the Order of the British Empire (KBE) ====
- Frederick Pa-Nukuanca Soakimori, O.B.E., C.P.M. For services to the Royal Solomon Islands Police Force.

==== Officer of the Order of the British Empire (OBE) ====
- James Tarasele Saliga. For public service.
- George Milner Tozaka. For public service.

== Tuvalu ==
=== The Most Excellent Order of the British Empire ===
==== Officer of the Order of the British Empire (OBE) ====
- The Honourable Houati Iele. For public, community and political services.

== Saint Lucia ==
=== Knight Bachelor ===
- Professor Fitz-Roy Richard Augier. For services to regional education.

=== The Most Excellent Order of the British Empire ===
==== Commander of the Order of the British Empire (CBE) ====
- Kenneth Dwight Vincent Venner. For public service in the area of finance.

==== Officer of the Order of the British Empire (OBE) ====
- Hollis Duncan Davidson Bristol. For community service.
- Marius Alexis Epihane St. Rose. For public service in the area of regional banking and finance.

==== Member of the Order of the British Empire (MBE) ====
- Rolin Etien Fernand. For services to agriculture.
- Miss Zenith Claire James. For public service.

== Saint Vincent and the Grenadines ==
=== The Most Excellent Order of the British Empire ===
==== Commander of the Order of the British Empire (CBE) ====
- Luther Reuben Clifford Robertson. For services to the community.

==== Member of the Order of the British Empire (MBE) ====
- George Levi Bailey. For services to Scouting and the community.

== Antigua and Barbuda ==
=== The Most Excellent Order of the British Empire ===
==== Officer of the Order of the British Empire (OBE) ====
- Reginald Wilfred Lipton Samuel. For public service.

==== Member of the Order of the British Empire (MBE) ====
- Dr. Albertine Mathurin Jurgensen. For public service.

== Saint Christopher and Nevis ==
=== The Most Distinguished Order of Saint Michael and Saint George ===
==== Knight Commander of the Order of St Michael and St George (KCMG) ====
- Joseph Nathaniel France, C.B.E. For services to industrial relations and Parliamentary representation.

==== Companion of the Order of St Michael and St George (CMG) ====
- Eustace Llewellyn John. For public and community service.
- Charles Egbert Mills. For services to education and Parliamentary representation.

=== The Most Excellent Order of the British Empire ===
==== Officer of the Order of the British Empire (OBE) ====
- Claude Lennix Woods. For public service and service to agriculture.

==== Member of the Order of the British Empire (MBE) ====
- Ernest Charles Ashton Amory. For services to commerce and the community.
- Keeth Lloyd Thomas Arthurton. For services to sport, particularly cricket.
