= Charlotte Manley =

Royal Navy officer

Dame Charlotte Elizabeth Manley, DCVO, OBE (born 1957) is a retired British naval officer and courtier, who served as the Chapter Clerk of St. George's Chapel, Windsor from 2003 to 2025.

== Naval career ==
Manley served in the Royal Navy as an officer from 1976 to 1996. She spent two years as an exchange officer with the United States Navy at Newport, Rhode Island. In 1990, she joined the destroyer HMS Bristol as one of the first women at sea in the Royal Navy. She was promoted to commander on 31 December 1993, was on the staff of the Second Sea Lord and Commander-in-Chief Naval Home Command in 1994, and was appointed an Officer of the Order of the British Empire in the 1996 Birthday Honours.

== Courtier ==
In 1996, Manley was on short-term contract in the Cabinet Office, before becoming Assistant Private Secretary and Comptroller to the Duke of York, and Comptroller to Princess Alexandra. Later she was promoted to Deputy Private Secretary and Comptroller to the then Duke of York and, on 3 August 2001, she became Private Secretary and Treasurer to the duke.

In 2003, Manley left the Royal Household and the Office of the Duke of York, and became Chapter Clerk of St George's Chapel, Windsor. She retired as Chapter Clerk in October 2025.

Manley was appointed a Lieutenant of the Royal Victorian Order in 2003, advanced to Commander of the Royal Victorian Order in 2018, and then to Dame Commander of the Royal Victorian Order in the 2026 New Year Honours.
