= Ken Schofield =

Kenneth Douglas Schofield CBE (born 3 February 1946) was the executive director of the European Tour from 1975 to 2004.

== Career ==
Schofield was born and raised in Perthshire, Scotland. He entered the banking profession at the age of 23.

On 1 January 1975, Schofield became executive director of the European Tour, replacing John Jacobs. He served in that capacity until the end of 2004. During his tenure, the tour grew from 17 events to 45, expanded around the world, and added the Challenge Tour and European Seniors Tour.

Schofield was appointed CBE in the 1996 Birthday Honours and awarded the Ambassador of Golf Award by the PGA Tour in 2006 and was inducted into the World Golf Hall of Fame in 2013.

His sporting interests extend to soccer and cricket. In 2007 he was appointed to chair an ECB committee to review why the previous winter's Ashes tour of Australia by the England cricket team had been a failure. The ECB subsequently endorsed 17 of the committee's 19 recommendations.

== Awards and honors ==
- In 1996, Schofield was appointed CBE at the 1996 Birthday Honours
- In 2006, he was awarded the Ambassador of Golf Award by the PGA Tour
- In 2013, Schofield was inducted into the World Golf Hall of Fame
