= John Ewington =

John Ewington OBE (14 May 1936 – 15 August 2015) was a British insurance underwriter who was the general secretary of the Guild of Church Musicians for 35 years from 1978 to 2014, and is widely credited with saving this 19th-century body from extinction.

He was born on 14 May 1936 and died suddenly on 15 August 2015. His funeral was at Blechingley Parish Church where he had been organist for more than 30 years. The music was provided by the City Singer with whom he had connections dating back to 1967. The lesson was read by Dame Mary Archer.

His connection with the Guild started in 1967 when he responded to an advertisement to study what was then called the Archbishop of Canterbury's Certificate in Church Music.

His "day job" was working in an insurance office in the City of London, where he specialised in writing policies for musical instruments.

He collected many honours, including the OBE and a Lambeth MA. He also had FGCM, DipChMus(Lond), ACertCM, HonFCSM, HonFFCM, HonRSCM, FGMS, Hon Associate of the University of Newcastle NSW and Conjoint Senior Lecturer at the Conservatorium School of Music and Drama in the Faculty of Education and Arts.
