= Roger Jones (pharmacist) =

Welsh pharmacist (1943–2026)

Sir Roger Spencer Jones OBE FLSW (2 July 1943 – 30 August 2026) was a Welsh researcher and manager in the pharmaceutical industry. He chaired or was a board member of many public bodies.

== Early life and education ==
Roger Spencer Jones was born on 2 July 1943 and brought up in a small and predominantly Welsh speaking village in the Dee valley. He was educated at Bala Boys' Grammar School and the Welsh School of Pharmacy, Cardiff. After his B.Pharm he completed his professional qualifications and went to Bradford Management School, where he gained his MSc.

== Employment ==
Jones joined the Wellcome Foundation and worked in consumer products marketing before taking up a line management job at Wellcome Nigeria. He then continued in line management in a regional capacity in West Africa and the Middle East. Subsequently, he oversaw operations in Eastern Europe and the Communist Bloc, where he gained experience in technology transfer. He was then appointed marketing planning manager and was a member of the corporate R&D committees. In 1982, he left Wellcome to establish his own contract development company, Penn Pharmaceuticals Ltd, which became one of the leading international companies in this field. He sold the business to its management team in 1999.

He realised the importance of staff training at the leading edge of technology and became active in the Training and Enterprise Councils and was chairman of Gwent TEC and later TEC Southeast Wales. He was also appointed to be one of the governors of the BBC in 1996. He was appointed chairman of the Welsh Development Agency (2002–2006).

== Achievements ==
With little access to capital funding, he recognised the need for contract development in the pharmaceutical industry and was instrumental in bringing 17 molecules into clinical use on behalf of clients. His unpublished work on thalidomide and his understanding of the effects of polymorphic variation on bioavailability assisted Cellgene's development of the molecule. He was the developer of high specification activated charcoal for the treatment of acute poisoning by establishing an intestinal dialysis using the gut wall as a semipermeable membrane.

Jones was made a fellow of the Royal Pharmaceutical Society in 2009. He became a "qualified person" under EEC regulations in 1991. He established several successful life science companies including ZooBiotic Ltd and Phytovation Ltd.

He was appointed an Officer of the Order of the British Empire (OBE) in the 1996 Birthday Honours for services to industry in Wales, and was knighted in the 2005 New Year Honours for services to business and training in Wales. He received an honorary DSc from the University of Wales Cardiff in 2000. He was a founding Fellow of the Learned Society of Wales (FLSW) and in July 2010 he was appointed its inaugural treasurer.

== Voluntary and other work ==
- Pro chancellor and chair of Swansea University (2005–2026)
- Trustee of the National Botanic Garden of Wales
- Chairman of Carmarthenshire Heritage Trust
- Trustee of Carmarthenshire Rivers Trust
- President of YMCA in Wales
- Governor of Christ College, Brecon

== Interests ==
Nature conservation; the countryside; shooting and salmon fishing. Club: The Athenaeum

== Death ==
Jones died on 30 August 2026, aged 83.
