= Crispian Strachan =

John Crispian Strachan CBE QPM DL (born 1949) was Chief Constable of Northumbria Police from 1998 to 2005.

== Life ==
Strachan was born in 1949 and read law at Jesus College, Oxford before receiving an M.A. in Criminology from the University of Sheffield. He became a constable in the Metropolitan Police in 1972, an Inspector in 1977, a Chief Inspector in 1983, a Superintendent in 1987 and a Chief Superintendent in 1990. He trained as a negotiator for hostage situations, and was part of the Royal and Diplomatic Protection service of the Metropolitan Police between 1985 and 1988. In 1993, Strachan became Assistant Chief Constable of Strathclyde Police, moving to Northumbria Police as Chief Constable in 1998. He was awarded the Queen's Police Medal in 1996, made a Deputy Lieutenant of Tyne and Wear in 2012 and appointed Commander of the Order of the British Empire (CBE) in 2003. He retired in 2005.

== Honours ==

Ribbon	Description	Notes
	Order of the British Empire (CBE)	Civil Division; Commander; 2003 Queen's Birthday Honours List
	Queen's Police Medal (QPM)	1996 Queen's Birthday Honours List
	Queen Elizabeth II Golden Jubilee Medal	2002; UK Version of this Medal
	Police Long Service and Good Conduct Medal	

- He was appointed as a Deputy Lieutenant for the County of Tyne and Wear in 2012. This gave him the Post Nominal Letters "DL" for Life.
