= Mary Anderson (gynaecologist) =

Scottish gynaecologist

Mary Anderson CBE FRCOG
- Born: Mary Margaret Anderson; 12 February 1932; Forres, Scotland
- Died: 17 February 2006 (aged 74); Forres, Scotland
- Education: University of Edinburgh
- Occupations: physician, gynaecologist
- Known for: Anderson Maternity Unit at Lewisham Hospital is named in her honour
- Medical career
- Profession: physician, gynaecologist
- Field: obstetrics and gynaecology
- Institutions: St Mary's Hospital, London; University Hospital Lewisham

Mary Margaret Anderson CBE FRCOG (12 February 1932– 17 February 2006) was a Scottish gynaecologist.

== Early life and education ==
Mary Margaret Anderson was born on 12 February 1932, in Forres, Scotland. Her mother Lily, was a mathematics teacher and her father a pharmacist. She was educated at Forres Academy where she was the Dux. She then studied medicine at the University of Edinburgh, graduating in 1956.

== Career ==
Anderson moved to London to complete her medical education. After finishing her studies, she took the post of the first female obstetrics registrar appointed at St Mary's Hospital in London.

In 1967, Anderson was as appointed a senior consultant and gynaecologist at the University Hospital Lewisham, where she worked until her retirement.

Anderson served as Vice-President of the Royal College of Obstetricians and Gynaecologists from 1989 to 1992, as a member of the Committee of the Future of Maternity Services, chaired by Baroness Cumberlege, and as a council member of the Medical Defence Union.

Anderson was cited as an expert on women's health issues, such as post menopausal bleeding. She was appointed a Commander of the British Empire (CBE) in the Queens Birthday Honours of 1996.

== Death and legacy ==
She died, aged 74, in Forres on 17 February 2006 from complications due to Parkinson's disease. She was interred in the family grave at Cluny Hill, Forres.

The Anderson Maternity Unit at Lewisham Hospital is named in her honour.

== Awards and honours ==
She was made a Commander of the Order of the British Empire (CBE) in the 1996 Birthday Honours, "For services to Medicine".
