= Joan Sallis =

British writer (died 2019)

Joan Sallis OBE was a British writer on educational matters, particularly in relation to school governance. She was the agony aunt behind the Times Educational Supplement's Ask the Expert column.

In 1996, she was awarded an honorary degree of Doctor of Laws by Oxford Brookes University.

Joan was the national president of the Campaign for State Education (CASE).She died in 2019, aged 91.

== Bibliography ==
- Basics for School Governors, by Joan Sallis, ISBN 1-85539-012-4 published by Network Educational Press
- Community Governors: your own guide, by Joan Sallis, ISBN 0-948543-86-8 published by Adamson Publishing
- Effective Governors, Effective Schools: Developing the Partnership, by Joan Sallis and Michael Creese, ISBN 1-85346-386-8 published by David Fulton Publishers
- Effective School Governors, by Joan Sallis, ISBN 0-273-65496-9 published by Pearson Education
- Foundation Governors in Faith Schools: your own guide, by Joan Sallis, ISBN 0-948543-91-4 published by Adamson Publishing
- Heads in Partnership (School Leadership & Management), by Joan Sallis, ISBN 0-273-65385-7 published by Pearson Education
- Local Authority Governors: your own guide, by Joan Sallis, ISBN 0-948543-81-7 published by Adamson Publishing
- Questions School Governors Ask, by Joan Sallis, ISBN 1-85539-146-5 published by Network Educational Press
- Parent Governors: your own guide, by Joan Sallis, ISBN 0-948543-71-X published by Adamson Publishing
- Staff Governors: your own guide, by Joan Sallis, ISBN 0-948543-76-0 published by Adamson Publishing
- The Parent Governor Book, by Joan Sallis, ISBN 1-870672-06-2 published by Advisory Centre for Education
