= Derek Pollard =

Chief Commissioner for England of the Scout Association

Derek Robert Pollard OBE (born April 1939), an academic and researcher in nuclear chemistry from Godalming, served as the Chief Commissioner for England of the Scout Association, Chairman of the Constitutions Committee of the World Organization of the Scout Movement, as well as a member of the Board of the World Scout Foundation.

== Background ==
He began Scouting in Surrey, England, where he held numerous local and then national responsibilities. He played an important role in organizing the World Scouting 2007 Centenary celebrations.

In 2010, Pollard was awarded the 326th Bronze Wolf, the only distinction of the World Organization of the Scout Movement, awarded by the World Scout Committee for exceptional services to world Scouting.

Pollard studied Chemistry at Sir John Cass College class of 1958. He has a PhD from the University of London and an Honorary Doctorate from Arcadia University in Philadelphia. He is a Freeman of The City of London and a Fellow of the Royal Society of Chemistry and The Royal Society of Arts. He was Deputy Director of the Council for National Academic Awards and Director of Validation Services at the Open University and Chair of the UK Council of Validating Universities. He played a leading role in the foundation of the European Erasmus Programme and the UK Foundation Degree. He lives in Godalming.

Pollard is Chairman of The Eric Frank Trust, Chairman of The Surrey Lifelong Learning Partnership and an Emeritus Trustee of Richmond AI University

In 1996 he was awarded an OBE for services to young people.
