= SEMEX =

Mexican division of Sharp

SEMEX Sharp Electrónica Mexico S.A. de C.V.
- Type: Private
- Founded: 1997; 29 years ago
- Headquarters: Tijuana, Mexico (production); Mexico City, Mexico (headquarters)
- Products: LED panels, LCD panels, LCD modules, printed circuitboards, televisions, white goods
- Number of employees: 5,000+
- Website: www.sharp.com.mx

SEMEX, full name Sharp Electrónica Mexico S.A. de C.V., is the semi-independent Mexican division of Japanese Sharp Electronics Corporation. It is responsible for the manufacture of all Sharp printed circuitboards, LED, LCD and plasma panels, modules and televisions in North and South America and is the sole representative and distributor of Sharp products in Mexico.

== History ==
The venture was formed in 1997 when a group of Mexican investors, the Mexican federal government and Sharp Electronics Japan signed a mutual agreement to open a factory in Baja California for the manufacture of Sharp CRT televisions and Sharp electronics components which would also begin to manufacture LCD televisions in 2001. By 1998 the factory had begun manufacturing home appliances and printed circuit boards with Kyoshas Mexican branch as well. In 2006 Sharp and Semex introduced a second plant in Baja California for the production of LCD panels, modules and televisions to address an increasing demand for flatscreen televisions in the US and Mexican markets. Currently, Sharp builds its full range of 19, 26, 32, 40, 42, 46, 52, 60, 70 and 80 inch LCD and LED televisions including 3D models, printed circuitboards, white goods, LCD & LED panels and LCD modules at Semex's facilities. The average weekly salary for a worker is US$150, which is 20% above average industrial salary in Mexico.
