= Chapter clerk =

Chapter Clerk is the title usually given to the officer responsible for the administrative support to the Chapter of a cathedral or collegiate church in the Church of England.

The post is usually occupied by a laity but may occasionally be carried out by someone who is ordained. Some cathedrals refer to their Chapter Clerks as Chapter Steward or occasionally managing director.
