= Guild of Church Musicians =

The Guild of Church Musicians is a charity to help encourage high standards in church music. It offers members examinations, courses, and awards. The guild is a fellowship of those who sincerely desire to offer the best in music to the service of the church: amateur and professional musicians unified in a common ideal.

The guild was founded in 1888 as the Church Choir Guild. It was incorporated in 1905 to become known as the Incorporated Guild of Church Musicians. The founding patrons were Archbishop Frederick Temple and Sir George Elvey, organist of St George's Chapel, Windsor.

Although the organization was mainly Anglican since its founding, in 1988 in the centenary year of the Archbishop of Canterbury, the Catholic Archbishop of Westminster was invited to become a joint patron, and the guild's openness to all branches of the Christian Church was affirmed.

== Examinations ==
Since 1961, the guild has been charged with the responsibility of administering and examining for the Archbishop of Canterbury's Certificate in Church Music. After 1988, the Certificate was renamed The Archbishops' Certificate in Church Music, incorporating the Archbishop of Westminster's patronage. The guild now offers five levels of professional awards plus a preliminary award for young people new to church music.

- Archbishop's Preliminary Certificate in Church Music: a basic qualification for younger people
- Archbishop's Award in Church Music: a lower professional qualification consisting only of the practical part of the ACertCM exam.
- Archbishop's Certificate in Church Music (ACertCM): open to all who have a serious interest or involvement in the music of the Christian Church, whether as choir directors, organists or keyboard players, choir singers, instrumental leaders, instrumentalists, worship leaders (cantors/animateurs), or in any similar capacity.
- Archbishop's Certificate in Public Worship (ACertPW): designed particularly to encourage and assist those with responsibility for public worship in all Christian denominations. It is open to any current member of the guild who has, or who seeks, responsibility for animating and presiding at public worship within the Church.
- Licentiate of The Guild of Church Musicians (LGCM): awarded to those who have completed Part I of the FGCM irrespective of whether they proceed to the Fellowship.
- Fellowship of The Guild of Church Musicians (FGCM): taken via modular, distance learning, it is the highest qualification awarded by the guild. It is intended for all musicians who work within the Christian Church, regardless of denomination. The Fellowship course aims to train and develop church musicians to be able to work with understanding and at a high standard.

== Leadership ==
=== Patrons ===
- The Archbishop of Canterbury
- The Cardinal Archbishop of Westminster

=== President ===
- Dame Mary Archer

=== Vice Presidents ===
- Richard Fenwick
- Richard Hurford
- Alan Luff
- Philip Matthias
- Anthony Russell
- Frank Sellens

The guild leadership also includes:

- a thirteen member Council which comprises several administrative officers,
- a board of Honorary Advisors, and
- an Academic Board.

The guild church is St Michael, Cornhill, in London.

== Publications ==
The Guild of Church Musicians have published two member study guides, which help the members pass the examination:

1. Landmarks in Christian Worship and Christian Music
2. Correspondence Course, to prepare for examinations

== See also ==
- Royal College of Organists
