= 2003 Birthday Honours =

British government recognitions

The 2003 Queen's Birthday Honours were announced on 14 June 2003 for the United Kingdom and on 2 June 2003 for New Zealand.

The recipients of honours are displayed here as they were styled before their new honour.

== United Kingdom ==
=== Knight Bachelor ===
- Kenneth Hugo Adam, O.B.E. For services to film production design and to UK-German relations.
- Martyn Arbib, D.L. For services to Charities, especially Education.
- Professor John Hamilton Baker, Q.C., Downing Professor of the Laws of England, University of Cambridge. For services to English Legal History.
- Professor Patrick Bateson, F.R.S., Professor of Ethology, University of Cambridge. For services to Science.
- Professor Sushantha Kumar Bhattacharyya, C.B.E., Director, Warwick Manufacturing Group, University of Warwick. For services to Higher Education and Industry.
- Ian Warwick Blair, Q.P.M., Deputy Commissioner, Metropolitan Police Service. For services to the Police.
- Kenneth Darlingston Collins, Chairman, Scottish Environment Protection Agency. For services to Environmental Protection.
- Andrew Duncan Crockett, lately Chairman, Financial Stability Forum and General Manager, Bank for International Settlements. For services to International Finance.
- Michael John Austin Cummins, Serjeant-At-Arms, House of Commons.
- Professor Richard Henry Friend, F.R.S., Cavendish Professor of Physics, University of Cambridge. For services to Physics.
- John Christopher Gains, Group Chief Executive, John Mowlem & Co. plc. For services to the Construction Industry.
- Arthur Benjamin Norman Gill, C.B.E., President, National Farmers’ Union. For services to Agriculture, Conservation and the Community.
- Michael Stewart Hodgkinson, Group Chief Executive, BAA plc. For services to the Air Travel Industry.
- John Anthony Holland, Chairman, Parades Commission for Northern Ireland.
- Dr Alistair Allan Horne, C.B.E., Historian. For services to UK-French relations.
- Peter Lampl, O.B.E., Chairman, Sutton Trust. For services to Higher Education.
- Francis Henry MacKay, Chairman, Compass Group. For services to the Hospitality Industry and Charity.
- Robin Robert William Miller, lately Chief Executive, EMAP. For services to Publishing and Broadcasting.
- William Morris, General Secretary, Transport and General Workers Union. For services to Trade Unions.
- Charles Kenneth Roylance Nunneley, lately Chairman, National Trust. For services to Heritage.
- Christopher John O’Donnell, Chief Executive, Smith & Nephew plc. For services to the Medical Devices Industry Worldwide.
- Dr John Oldham, O.B.E. For services to the NHS.
- Christopher Ondaatje, C.B.E., Philanthropist and Benefactor. For charitable services to Museums, Galleries and Societies.
- John Reginald Rowling, Headteacher, Nunthorpe School, Middlesbrough. For services to Education.
- Dr Kenneth Robinson, Academic writer and speaker. For services to art.
- Professor Edwin Mellor Southern, F.R.S., Whitley Professor of Biochemistry, University of Oxford. For services to the Development of DNA Microarray Technologies.
- William George Taylor, Leader, Blackburn with Darwen Borough Council. For services to Local Government.
- Professor John Graham Temple. For services to Medicine and Medical Education.
- John Tusa, Managing Director, Barbican Centre. For services to the Arts.

=== Order of the Bath ===
==== Knight Commander of the Order of the Bath (KCB) ====
Military Division

- Admiral Ian Andrew Forbes, C.B.E.

Civil Division

- Brian Geoffrey Bender, C.B., Permanent Secretary, Department for Environment, Food and Rural Affairs.
- Richard John Broadbent, Chairman, H.M. Customs and Excise.

==== Companion of the Order of the Bath (CB) ====
Military Division

- Rear Admiral Alexander Kirkwood Backus, O.B.E.
- Rear Admiral Jonathon Reeve.
- Air Vice-Marshal Phillip Wycliffe Roser, M.B.E., Royal Air Force.
- Air Vice-Marshal Andrew George Buchanan Vallance, O.B.E., Royal Air Force.

Civil Division

- Catherine Elisabeth Dorcas, Mrs Bell, Director General, Services Group, Department of Trade and Industry.
- Terrance Dennis Byrne, Director General, Law Enforcement, H.M. Customs and Excise.
- George Cubie, Clerk of Committees, House of Commons.
- John Michael Dowdall. For public service.
- John Gant, Director of Finance, Inland Revenue.
- Roy Jason Griffins, Director, Aviation Directorate, Department for Transport.
- Stephen Geoffrey Hewitt, Business Design Director, Department for Work and Pensions.
- Gordon Hextall, Chief Operating Officer, Programme and Systems Delivery, Department for Work and Pensions.
- Christopher Stephen Kerse, Second Counsel to the Chairman of Committees and Legal Adviser to the European Union Committee, House of Lords.
- John MacDonald Lyon, lately Director General, Policing and Crime Reduction Group, Home Office.
- Hugh Finlay MacDiarmid, Solicitor to the Advocate General for Scotland.
- Clive Murray Norris, Director, Fire, Health and Safety Directorate, Office of the Deputy Prime Minister.
- Stephen Wentworth, Fisheries Director, Department for Environment, Food and Rural Affairs.

=== Order of St Michael and St George ===
==== Knight Grand Cross of the Order of St Michael and St George (GCMG) ====
- Sir John Robertson Young, K.C.M.G., British High Commissioner, New Delhi.

==== Knight Commander of the Order of St Michael and St George (KCMG) ====
- John Frederick Mogg, lately Director-General Internal Markets and Financial Services, European Commission.
- Peter John Westmacott, C.M.G., L.V.O., H.M. Ambassador, Ankara.

==== Companion of the Order of St Michael and St George (CMG) ====
- Richard Harding Alford, O.B.E., Director Italy, British Council.
- Andrew Robert Fowell Buxton. For services to UK trade.
- Judge Ian Burns Campbell, lately Deputy High Representative for Legal Affairs, Bosnia and Herzegovina.
- Bruce Harry Dinwiddy, Governor, Cayman Islands.
- Dr Carol Dow, Chief Medical Adviser, Foreign and Commonwealth Office.
- Edward Charles Glover, M.V.O., lately British High Commissioner, Georgetown.
- Air Vice-Marshal Hubert Desmond Hall, C.B., C.B.E., A.F.C. For services to UK-Australia relations.
- Nigel Norman Inkster, Counsellor, Foreign and Commonwealth Office.
- Michael Kirkwood, Chairman, American Financial Services Association. For services to the city and to the US Financial Community in the UK.
- Brigadier Graeme Cameron Maxwell Lamb, O.B.E., late The Queen's Own Highlanders.
- Professor Michael Lipton, Founding Director, Poverty Research Unit, University of Sussex. For services to International Development.
- John MacCalman (Ian) Little, C.B.E., lately member of the UK delegation to the European Economic and Social Committee and President of its Employers Group.
- Dr Rosalind Mary Marsden, Director Asia-Pacific, Foreign and Commonwealth Office.
- John Michael Scott, lately Head, Rural Livelihoods Department, Department for International Development.
- Percival Edward Tarling, Deputy Director-General, General Secretariat, Council of the European Union.

=== Royal Victorian Order ===
==== Knight Commander of the Royal Victorian Order (KCVO) ====
- Timothy Gerald Martin Brooks, formerly Lord Lieutenant of Leicestershire.
- Brigadier Miles Garth Hunt-Davis, C.V.O., C.B.E., Private Secretary to The Duke of Edinburgh.
- Dr Richard Paul Hepworth Thompson, Head of The Queen's Medical Household and Physician to The Queen.

==== Commander of the Royal Victorian Order (CVO) ====
- The Honourable Ronald Joseph Arculli, O.B.E., Chairman, The Duke of Edinburgh's Award, International Association.
- Major Nicholas Michael Lancelot Barne, L.V.O., Comptroller, Equerry and Private Secretary to The Duke and Duchess of Gloucester.
- Martin Charles Brian Bonsey, L.V.O., formerly Official Secretary, Government House, Canberra.
- Dr Andrew Louis Hamilton Gailey, House Master, Eton College.
- Sir Peter Harold Reginald Marshall, K.C.M.G., formerly Chairman, Joint Commonwealth Societies’ Council.
- Mary, Lady Carew Pole, L.V.O., Lady in Waiting to The Princess Royal.
- Kenneth Robert Williams, Q.P.M. For services to the Norfolk Constabulary.

==== Lieutenant of the Royal Victorian Order (LVO) ====
- Helen Andrea Louise, Mrs Cross, M.V.O., Secretary to the Private Secretary to The Queen.
- Richard Francis Dobb, Secretary, Corporation of Trinity House.
- Roger Martin Eldridge, Managing Director, Camera Press Limited.
- Colonel David Valentine Fanshawe, O.B.E., Lieutenant, Her Majesty's Body Guard of the Honourable Corps of Gentlemen at Arms.
- Miss Charlotte Elizabeth Manley, O.B.E., Private Secretary and Treasurer to The Duke of York.
- Jonathan Mark Marsden, Deputy Surveyor of The Queen's Works of Art.
- Terence John Regan. For services to The Duke of Edinburgh's Award.
- John Garrett Speirs, C.B.E., formerly Chairman, UK Faculty, The Prince of Wales's Business and the Environment Programme.
- Colin David Tweedy, O.B.E., Chief Executive, Arts and Business.

==== Member of the Royal Victorian Order (MVO) ====
- Kenneth John Appleby, Senior Property Officer, St James's Palace.
- Nigel Marcus Baker, formerly Assistant Private Secretary to The Prince of Wales.
- Stephen Harvey Caldwell, formerly Senior Property Officer, Windsor Castle.
- Major (Matthew) Munro Davidson, M.B.E., B.E.M., Superintendent, Windsor Castle.
- Gillian Mary, Mrs Frampton, Nursing Sister, Windsor Castle.
- David Moffat, formerly Director of Private Clients, Aon Limited.
- Jeremy George Pontin, formerly Land Steward, Isles of Scilly, Duchy of Cornwall.
- Richard Anthony Skinner, formerly Director of Bentley and Skinner.
- Malcolm Richard Slater, Sales Manager, Bentley Mulliner.
- Warrant Officer Class 1 Brian Howard Michael Smith, M.B.E., M.S.M., Superintending Clerk, Household Division.
- Frederick George Stickler, Chief Forestry Officer, Crown Estate.
- Caroline Francesca, Mrs Todhunter, formerly Queen Elizabeth The Queen Mother's Representative, Queen Mary's Clothing Guild.

=== Royal Victorian Medal ===
==== Royal Victorian Medal (Gold) ====
- Anthony Vernon Parnell, R.V.M., Foreman, Sandringham House.
- Ashley John Sadler, R.V.M., Mechanic, Sandringham Estate.

==== Bar to the Royal Victorian Medal (Silver) ====
- Robert John Pine, R.V.M., Pastry Sous Chef, Royal Household.

==== Royal Victorian Medal (Silver) ====
- Michael Norman Back, Assistant Manager, Public Enterprises, Sandringham Estate.
- Constable Charles Clement Collings, Royalty and Diplomatic Protection, Metropolitan Police.
- Stephen Allan Grassick, Joiner, Balmoral Estate.
- Constable Ronald James Hayward, Royalty and Diplomatic Protection, Metropolitan Police.
- Christopher David Hillyard, Special Vehicles Manager, Alstom Transport.
- Frederick Arthur Ind, Estate Worker, Highgrove Estate.
- Raymond Frederick Keates, Painter and Decorator, Crown Estate, Windsor.
- Mark Geoffrey Lisk, Gardener, Sunninghill Park.
- Charles George Lockyer, Telephone Engineer, Royal Household.
- John Henry Melton, Tractor Driver, Sandringham Country Park.
- Colin Missenden, formerly Divisional Sergeant Major, The Queen's Body Guard of the Yeomen of the Guard.
- Keith Thomas Parker, Warden, Windsor Castle.
- Ivor Benjamin Reeves, Part-time Security Officer, Eton College.
- Roy John Reeves, Gardener, Crown Estate, Windsor.
- Arthur Malcolm Smith, Chef de Partie, Royal Household.
- Wayne Laurence Sutton, Chauffeur to the Governor of Tasmania.
- Constable Russell Wood, Royalty and Diplomatic Protection, Metropolitan Police.

=== Order of the Companions of Honour (CH) ===
- David Hugh Alexander, Baron Hannay of Chiswick, G.C.M.G., lately UK Special Representative for Cyprus.
- Sir (Alan) Charles (MacLaurin) Mackerras, C.B.E., Composer and Conductor. For services to Music.
- Professor Dan Peter McKenzie, F.R.S., Royal Society Research Professor, Department of Earth Sciences, University of Cambridge. For services to Science.

=== Order of the British Empire ===
==== Dame Commander of the Order of the British Empire (DBE) ====
- Miss Elizabeth Violet Blackadder, O.B.E., Painter. For services to the Visual Arts.
- Ms Yvonne Helen Elaine Buckland, Chair, Health Development Agency. For services to Public Health.
- Ms Pamela Sarah Coward, Headteacher, Middleton Technology College, Rochdale. For services to Education.
- Dr (Valerie) Jane Goodall, C.B.E. For services to the environment and conservation.
- Ms Helen Mirren, Actress. For services to Drama.
- Professor Julia Margaret Polak, Head, Tissue Engineering and Regenerative Medicine Centre, Imperial College, London. For services to Medicine.
- Miss Ruth Laura Robins, Headteacher, JFS School, Brent, London. For services to Education.
- Anita Lucia, Mrs Roddick, O.B.E., Founder of The Body Shop. For services to Retailing, the Environment and Charity.

==== Knight Commander of the Order of the British Empire (KBE) ====
- Lieutenant General Cedric Norman George Delves, C.B.E., D.S.O., late The Devonshire and Dorset Regiment.
- Roger George Moore, C.B.E. For charitable services, especially to UNICEF and Kiwanis International.
- The Honourable Michael Aidan Pakenham, C.M.G., H.M. Ambassador, Warsaw.

==== Commander of the Order of the British Empire (CBE) ====
Military Division

- Commodore Peter John Lannin. Royal Fleet Auxiliary.
- Commodore Julian Llewelyn Williams. Royal Navy.
- Air Commodore Kevin James Leeson. Royal Air Force.
- Air Commodore Nigel Richard Wood. Royal Air Force.
- Brigadier Tweedie McGarth Brown, OBE. Late Corps of Royal Engineers.
- Brigadier Shaun Philip Cowlam, MBE. Late The Royal Logistic Corps.
- Brigadier Andrew Peter Farquhar, MBE. Late The Green Howards.
- Colonel Simon Leslie Porter. Late The Royal Anglian Regiment.
- Colonel Ian Robert Sinclair. Late Royal Regiment of Artillery.
- Major-General Graham Gerald Messervy-Whiting, MBE. Late Intelligence Corps.

Civilian Division

- Christopher Nigel Banks. Chair, Learning and Skills Council's Young People's Learning Committee and Chair, London Employers' Coalition. For services to Young People and the Unemployed.
- John Bartle. For services to Advertising, Charity and Education.
- Simon Russell Beale, Actor. For services to Drama.
- Edward Geoffrey Beardsall, Director, Business Development and Deputy chief executive, HM Land Registry, Lord Chancellor's Department.
- Robert Beckham, Director, Intellectual Property Rights, Defence Procurement Agency, Ministry of Defence.
- Marcus de la Poer Beresford, Lately Chief Executive, GKN plc. For services to the Engineering Industry Worldwide.
- Ms Christina Ann Bienkowska, Divisional Manager, Strategy and Performance Division, Department for Education and Skills.
- Mrs Margaret Janet Bloom, Director, Competition Enforcement, Office of Fair Trading.
- Dr Ian Gibb Bogle, Chair of Council, British Medical Association. For services to Medicine.
- Derek Arnold Boothman, Non-Executive Director, Remploy. For services to Disabled People and to the Accounting Profession.
- Christopher Paul Brearley, Director, Methodology and Information, Social Services Inspectorate, Department of Health.
- Mrs Mary Teresa Breslin, Lately Managing Partner, Total Engineering. For services to Business and to the community in Londonderry.
- Richard David Briers, OBE, Actor. For services to Drama.
- Alan Britten. Lately Chair, English Tourism Council.
- Andrew Gibson Brown, QPM, Chief Constable, Grampian Police. For services to the Police.
- James Thomas Brown, Head, Public Health Division, Health Department, Scottish Executive.
- George Brumwell, General Secretary, Union of Construction, Allied Trades and Technicians and Member, Health and Safety Commission. For services to the Construction Industry.
- Thomas William Cain, QC. Lately First Deemster, For services to the Administration of Justice in the Isle of Man.
- Andrew Robertson Campbell, OBE, JP, DL, Convenor, Dumfries and Galloway Council. For services to Local Government and to Agriculture.
- Miss Susan Catherine Campbell, MBE, Chief Executive, Youth Sports Trust. For services to Sport.
- Mrs Anthea Fiendley Case,. Director, National Heritage Memorial Fund. For services to Heritage.
- Alan Herbert Cherry, MBE, DL, Chairman, Countryside Properties plc and Greenwich Millennium Village Ltd. For services to Urban Regeneration and the Housebuilding Industry.
- Commander David Julian Childs, Founder, National Memorial Arboretum.
- Richard John Clayton, Assistant Legal Adviser, Home Office.
- William Connolly, Actor and Comedian. For services to Entertainment.
- Anthony Cooper, Headteacher, Aldercar Community College, Derbyshire. For services to Education.
- Professor Joseph Mordaunt Crook. For services to Architectural History.
- James Roderick Alexander Cumming, Chief Executive, Highlands and Islands Enterprise. For services to Economic Development.
- Ms Monica Darnbrough, Director, Bioscience Unit, Department of Trade and Industry.
- Ian Frederic Hay Davison. For charitable services, especially to the Arts.
- Mike Deegan, Chief Executive, Central Manchester and Manchester Children's University Hospitals NHS Trust. For services to the NHS.
- Andrew Dillon, Chief Executive, National Institute for Clinical Excellence.
- Mrs Elizabeth Eccles, Head of Resource Allocation, Department of Health.
- David Albert Edmonds, Director General of Telecommunications, OFTEL.
- Professor Kay-Tee Khaw-Fawcett, Professor of Clinical Gerontology, University of Cambridge. For services to Medicine.
- Iain George Thomas Ferguson, Chief Executive, Tate and Lyle plc. For services to the Food Industry.
- Simon Joseph Fraser, Founder Chairman, Fibrowatt Ltd. For services to the Renewable Energy Industry.
- Mrs Adrienne Sheila Fresko, Deputy Chair, Audit Commission. For services to Local Government and to the Health Service.
- William Leslie Gardner, Lately Chief Veterinary Officer, Scotland, Department for Environment, Food and Rural Affairs.
- Mrs Helen Mary Gilchrist, Principal, Bury College. For services to Further Education.
- Alan Raymond Gillespie. For services to the Northern Ireland Economy and the Commonwealth Development Corporation.
- David Jon Gilmour, Songwriter, Guitarist and Singer. For services to Music.
- Charles Philip Graf, Lately Chief Executive, Trinity Mirror. For services to Regional Newspapers.
- Alan Thomas Grieve, Chairman, Jerwood Foundation. For services to the Arts.
- Eric Hagman, Chairman, Audit Committee, Scottish Enterprise. For services to Economic Development.
- Peter Hampson, QPM, Chief Constable, West Mercia Police. For services to the Police.
- William George Hastings, OBE, Chairman, Hastings Hotels Group. For services to the Northern Ireland Economy and the Hotel Sector.
- David Peter Hemery, MBE, Lately President UK Athletics. For services to Athletics.
- Pierre Francois Horsfall, OBE. For services to the community on Jersey.
- Howell Meirion Harris Hughes, Secretary to the Church Commissioners.
- Mrs Sandra Pauline Hunt, Assistant Chief Executive, London Borough of Newham. For services to Urban Regeneration in London.
- George Iacobescu, Chief Executive, Canary Wharf Group. For services to Regeneration and Inward Investment.
- Colin Ray Jackson, OBE, Athlete. For services to Sport.
- Terence Jagger, Director, Defence Evaluation Research Agency Partnering Team, Ministry of Defence.
- Gary Jones. For services to Emergency Nursing.
- Anish Kapoor, Sculptor. For services to the Arts.
- Thomas Joseph Kavanagh, Secretary, Gaming Board for Great Britain.
- Simon John Keenlyside, Opera Singer. For services to Music.
- Dr Mary Paula Jane King Kilbane, Chief Executive, Eastern Health and Social Services Board. For services to Health Care in Northern Ireland.
- Professor Peter Thomas Kirstein. Professor of Computer Systems, University College London. For services to Internetworking Research.
- Miss Christine Knott, Chief Officer, Greater Manchester Probation Area. For services to the Probation Service.
- Professor Hermione Lee, Writer and Academic. For services to Literature.
- Miss Jennifer Lee Leggott, Director of Service Improvement, Planning and Nursing, Nottingham City Hospital. For services to Nursing and Midwifery.
- David Ian Lockwood, North West Area Manager, HM Prison Service, Home Office.
- John Christopher Lowry, Chairman, Standing Dental Advisory Committee. For services to Hospital Dental Surgery.
- Gerald Cyril Manning, OBE, Member, Environment Agency Board. For services to Flood Defence and to the Environment.
- David Arthur Ambler Marshall, Director General, Society of British Aerospace Companies. For services to Defence and Aerospace Industries.
- Professor Gordon Marshall, Lately Chief Executive, Economic and Social Research Council. For services to Economic and Social Research.
- Robert Crawford Martin. For public service.
- Ms Judith McClure (Mrs Collins), Headteacher, St. George's School for Girls, Edinburgh. For services to Education in Scotland.
- Iain Macleod McMillan, Director, CBI Scotland. For services to Lifelong Learning.
- Deryk Mead, Chief Executive, National Children's Homes. For services to Children.
- Dr Dorothy Carnegie Moir, Director of Public Health, NHS Lanarkshire. For services to Public Health Medicine.
- James William Charles Moir, LVO, Controller, BBC Radio 2. For services to Broadcasting.
- Alfred Cosier Morris, DL, Vice-Chancellor, University of the West of England. For services to Higher Education.
- Elwyn Rhys Moseley, Commissioner, Commission for Local Administration in Wales. For services to Local Government.
- Neil Christopher Munro, Director, Revenue Policy, Inland Revenue.
- Mrs Bushra Khanum Nasir, Headteacher, Plashet School, Newham. For services to Education.
- Professor Linda Partridge, FRS, FRSE, Weldon Professor of Biometry, University College London, and President of the Genetics Society. For services to Evolutionary Biology.
- David Patterson, Founder and Emeritus President, Oxford Centre for Hebrew and Jewish Studies. For services to Jewish Studies.
- Howard Wesley Petch, OBE, Regional Co-ordinator, Farm Crisis Network, Yorkshire and Humber. For services to Farming and to Rural Communities in the East Riding of Yorkshire.
- Professor Colin Trevor Pillinger, FRS, Professor of Planetary Science, Open University. For services to Higher Education and to Science.
- Professor Robert Pratt, Professor of Nursing and Director, Richard Wells Research Centre. For services to Nurse Education.
- George Richard Profit, OBE, AFC. For services to Aviation Safety.
- Professor Christopher Graham Rapley, Director, British Antarctic Survey. For services to the Environmental Sciences.
- Ian William Reeves. For services to Business and the Tomorrow's People Trust.
- Brian Rigby. Lately Deputy Chief Executive, Office of Government Commerce, HM Treasury.
- Dickon Hugh Wheelwright Robinson, Director, Development and Planning, Peabody Trust. For services to Housing.
- Professor Martin Oliver Roland, Professor of General Practice and director of the National Primary Care Research and Development Centre, University of Manchester. For services to Medicine.
- Michael David Sherrard, QC, Director of Advocacy, Middle Temple, London. For services to the Legal Profession.
- Peter Anthony Smith, Lately General Secretary of the Association of Teachers and Lecturers. For services to Education.
- James Alexander Stephenson, Lately Chair, Advantage West Midlands. For services to Economic Regeneration, Partnership Working and Manufacturing in the West Midlands.
- Ian Stopps, Chief Executive, Lockheed Martin UK Ltd. For services to the Defence and Aerospace Industries.
- John Crispian Strachan, QPM, DL, Chief Constable, Northumbria Police. For services to the Police.
- Gordon Matthew Sumner, (Sting), Singer and Songwriter. For services to the Music Industry.
- Ms Marion Hooper Tait, (Mrs Morse) OBE, Ballet Mistress, Birmingham Royal Ballet. For services to Dance.
- Miss Sarah Ann Thane, Director of Programmes and Advertising, Independent Television Commission. For services to Broadcasting.
- Miss Yvonne Thompson, Managing Director, ASAP Communications Ltd. For services to Black and Ethnic Minority Business.
- The Rt Rev Anthony Michael Arnold Turnbull, Lately Bishop of Durham and formerly Bishop of Rochester. For services to the Governance of the Church of England and to Regional Affairs.
- Derek Turner, Lately Managing Director, Street Management, Transport for London. For services to Transport in London.
- Professor Gordon Alexander Bryce Waddell. For services to Social Policy and Disability Assessment.
- Ms Anne Margaret Watts, OBE. For services to Diversity.
- Adrian Spencer Vaughan Williams, Headteacher, Bury St. Edmunds County Upper School, Suffolk. For services to Education.
- Robert Barclay Woods, Group Managing Director, P&O Nedlloyd and President, Chamber of Shipping. For services to Shipping.
- Mrs Charmaine Carolyn Young. Regeneration Director, St. George, Berkeley Group. For services to Urban Regeneration.

==== Order of the British Empire (OBE) ====
Civilian Division

- Maqsood Ahmed, Muslim Adviser, Home Office.
- Isadora Joye, Mrs. Aiken, D.L., Governor, Sheffield Hallam University. For services to Education and to the community.
- Edgar William Allaway, Vice-President. For services to the Soldiers’, Sailors’ and Airmen's Families Association, Suffolk Branch.
- Ms Sonita Alleyne, Director, Somethin’ Else Sound Directions Ltd. For services to Broadcasting.
- Roger Townley Alston, Headteacher, William Howard School, Brampton, Cumbria. For services to Education.
- Frederick Joseph Archer, lately Head, Efficiency and Consultancy Group, H.M. Prison Service, Home Office.
- Catherine, Mrs. Baraniak. For services to Primary Care Nursing.
- Dorcas Anne, Mrs. Batstone. For services to Gas and Electricity Customers.
- Professor Robert Thompson Beaty, Chairman, Scottish Enterprise, Renfrewshire. For services to Enterprise.
- David Robert Joseph Beckham. For services to Football.
- Eric Gairdner Bell, Senior Partner, Grant Thornton, Belfast. For services to Commerce and Industry.
- Gordon Bellard. For services to the Promotion of Nuclear Safety in the UK.
- Mohamed Hanef Bhamjee, Founder, Wales Anti-Apartheid Movement. For services to Race Relations, the Wales Anti-Apartheid Movement and the charity and voluntary sector.
- Major John David Blumsom, T.D., Chairman, Hertfordshire Committee. For services to the Army Benevolent Fund.
- Professor Alan Raymond Boobis, lately Deputy Chairman, Advisory Committee on Pesticides. For services to the Risk Assessment of Pesticides.
- Pek Lan, Mrs. Bower, Head, Library and Information Services, Department of Health.
- Professor Dianna Joy Bowles, Weston Chair of Biochemistry, University of York. For services to Plant Sciences.
- Peter Francis Boyle, County Director, BABC—Clubs for Young People. For services to Young People in Buckinghamshire.
- Moira Jean, Mrs. Britton, Chief Executive, Tees and North East Yorkshire NHS Trust. For services to the NHS.
- Stephen Gallagher Britton. Managing Director, Euro/ DPC, Llanberis, North Wales. For services to the Diagnostics Industry.
- David Brook, Head, Planning Policy Branch for Land Stability, Flooding, Pollution Control and the Coastal Zone, OYce of the Deputy Prime Minister.
- Dr. Richard Gordon McBride Budgett, Chief Medical Officer, British Olympic Association. For services to Sport.
- Gordon Byrne, Director, Upper Bann Institute of Further and Higher Education, Banbridge, Co Down. For services to Further Education.
- Miss Linda May Campbell, Chief Executive, United Kingdom Accreditation Service. For services to Accreditation.
- Ian Gillett Carmichael, Actor. For services to Drama.
- Andrew Nicholas Carter, Headteacher, South Farnham Community Junior School, Surrey. For services to Education.
- Nigel Rodney Cartwright, Head of Branch and Principal Emergencies and Security Officer, Water Services, Department for Environment, Food and Rural Affairs.
- John Lucius Arthur Cary, Chairman, Seed Capital Ltd. For services to Business.
- Nemu Chandaria. For services to the Jain Community.
- Trevor Chandler, Head, Pen Green Early Excellence Centre, Corby, Northamptonshire. For services to Early Years Education.
- Mohammed Akram Khan-Cheema, Consultant to the Association for Muslim Schools. For services to Education.
- Bridget Katherine, Mrs. Cherry. For services to Architectural History.
- David Clark, Senior Business Manager, Law Enforcement and Detection, H.M. Customs and Excise.
- Edward James Clark, Prosecution Investigator, Inland Revenue.
- John Neville Cohen, Head, Americas Section, Invest UK, Department of Trade and Industry.
- Lieutenant Commander Ian Michael Patrick Coombes, R.N. (Retd.), Secretary and Treasurer. For services to the Association of Royal Navy Officers.
- Ms Catherine Corcoran. For services to the Catholic Agency for Overseas Development.
- Dr. Jacqueline Margery Mary Cornish, Paediatric Bone Marrow Transplant Physician, Bristol. For services to the National Health Service.
- Dr. James Cox, General Medical Practitioner, Cumbria. For services to Medicine.
- John Crossan, Principal, Mount Gilbert Community College, Belfast. For services to Education.
- Dr. Robert Crouch, Consultant Nurse and Senior Lecturer, Emergency Department, Southampton General Hospital. For services to Nursing.
- Ian Roy Cumming, Chief Executive, Morecambe Bay Hospitals NHS Trust. For services to the NHS.
- David Innes Dalgetty, Team Leader, Finance and Central Services Department, Scottish Executive.
- Peter William Daniels, Chief Executive, East Renfrewshire Council. For services to Local Government.
- Ms Harriet Lydia Rose Llewellyn-Davies. For services to Housing and the Homeless in London.
- The Reverend Dr. Noel Anthony Davies. For services Ecumenism in Wales.
- Alan George Davis, Associate Partner, IBM (UK) Ltd. For services to the Ministry of Defence.
- Raoul Frederick John de Vaux, J.P., Chairman, National Pubwatch. For services to the Licensed Trade.
- William Anthony Doran, Managing Director, Construction Employers’ Federation. For services to Planning.
- Tan Draig, Programme Manager, Q Arts. For services to Art.
- Professor Douglas Eaglesham Dunn, Poet. For services to Literature.
- Philip Dykins, Head of Branch, Transport Strategy Division, Department for Transport.
- Ronald Eamonson. For services to the community, especially Regeneration and Business in Birmingham.
- Ellen Margaret, Mrs. Eaton, Leader, City of Bradford Metropolitan District Council. For services to Local Government and to the community in Bradford.
- Susan Kathleen, Mrs. Elworthy, Director of Nursing, North Glamorgan NHS Trust. For services to Nursing in Wales.
- James Henry Robert Eyre, Architect and Director, Wilkinson Eyre Architects. For services to Architecture.
- Peter Charles Fair, J.P., lately Lead OYcer for Northampton Schools Review. For services to Education.
- David George Farrar. For services to Occupational Health.
- Christine Mary, Mrs. Field, lately Chairman, Magistrates’ Association Family Proceedings Committee. For services to the Administration of Justice in London.
- Anne, Mrs. Fine, Children's Laureate. For services to Literature.
- Keith Antony Ford, Chief Executive, Mayday Healthcare NHS Trust. For services to the NHS.
- Ms Beryl Foster. For services to Tackling Violence against Women.
- Professor Brian Foster, Professor of Experimental Physics, University of Bristol. For services to Research on Particle Physics.
- Ms Ann Freckleton, Policy and Strategy Adviser (Asia), Department for International Development.
- Miss Elizabeth Jean Fulton, Chief Executive, BIH Housing Association. For services to Housing in Northern Ireland.
- Alan Galley, Chief Executive Officer, Freightliner Ltd. For services to the Railway Industry.
- Paul Winnett Gates, General Secretary, Knitwear, Footwear and Apparel Trades Union. For services to Industrial Relations in the UK Textiles Industry.
- Colin Sidney George, Chair, Lifelong Learning Foundation. For services to Vocational Education and Human Resource Development.
- Charlotte, Mrs. Gere. For services to Heritage, especially Decorative Arts and Jewellery.
- Guy Edward Gibbons, Grade B1, Ministry of Defence.
- Anthony Alan Gibson, Regional Director, National Farmers’ Union. For services to Agriculture and the Rural Economy in the South West.
- Jonathan Francesc Gili. For services to Broadcasting.
- Norman Neil Nicolson Gillies, Director, Sabhal Mor Ostaig. For services to Education and the Gaelic Language.
- Keith Gledson. For public service.
- Philip Ralph Golding. Headteacher, St Helen's Primary School, Ipswich, Suffolk. For services to Education.
- Ms Christine Gowdridge, Director, Maternity Alliance. For services to Families.
- Charles McKenzie Graham, lately Inspector, Occupational Health, Health and Safety Executive.
- David Currie Grahame, Founder Director, LINC Scotland. For services to Entrepreneurship in Scotland.
- Professor Alan John Gray, Director, Centre for Ecology and Hydrology Dorset Laboratory. For services to Government and Academic Science.
- Alastair Keith Gray, Senior Research Officer, Veterinary Medicines Directorate, Department for Environment, Food and Rural Affairs.
- David Gray, lately Head of Site, HRI East Malling and Wye. For Scientific and Technological services to the UK Horticulture Industry.
- David Green, M.B.E., Director, Combined Heat and Power Association. For services to Energy Efficiency.
- Hilary, Mrs. Grieve, lately Chair, Dumfries and Galloway Acute and Maternity Hospitals NHS Trust. For services to the NHS.
- Loyd Daniel Gilman Grossman. For services to Patient Care, especially Hospital Catering.
- Colin Watt Hague, Chief Test Pilot, Westland Helicopters. For services to Aviation.
- Howard Michael Haslam, Chief Planning OYcer, South Norfolk Council. For services to the Planning Industry.
- William Haughey, Executive Chairman, City Refrigeration. For services to Entrepreneurship in the West of Scotland.
- Professor Alastair Watt MacIntyre Hay, Professor of Environmental Toxicology, University of Leeds. For services to Occupational Health.
- Major Norman Edwin Hearson, J.P., D.L. For services to the community, especially the Hampshire Playing Fields Association and The Hampshire Technology Centre Trust Limited.
- Miss Maureen Henderson, Executive Director, Nursing, South Glasgow University Hospitals Trust. For services to the NHS in Scotland.
- The Very Reverend Dr. Michael John Higgins, Dean of Ely. For services to the Heritage of Ely Cathedral.
- Robin Philip Coventry Higgs. For services to the Environment and Heritage in Surrey and Hampshire.
- Julian Miles Holland (Jools Holland), Musician and Television Presenter. For services to the British Music Industry.
- Andrew Myers Holroyd. For services to Publicly Funded Legal Services in Liverpool.
- Beryl Edith, Mrs. Holt, Headteacher, Woodchurch High Specialist Engineering College, Wirral. For services to Education.
- Stuart Housden, Director, Royal Society for the Protection of Birds, Scotland. For services to Nature Conservation in Scotland.
- Barrie Hudson, Chief Executive, Forestry Contracting Association. For services to Forestry.
- Norman William Hudson, Technical Adviser, Historic Houses Association. For services to the Heritage Tourism Industry.
- John William Hughes, Chairman, Welsh Regional Flood Defence Committee. For services to Flood Defence in Wales.
- Christopher George Wilson Hunter, Principal, Glasgow College of Nautical Studies. For services to Further Education in Scotland.
- Ms Carol Isherwood, For services to Women's Rugby.
- Miss Geraldine James, Actress. For services to Drama.
- Ananda Jayatissa Jayasekera, Head, Sharp Programme, Licensing and Exploration Directorate, Department of Trade and Industry.
- Elwyn Tudno Jones. For services to the community in Wales.
- Gareth Jones, Director, Agricultural and Rural Affairs, National Assembly for Wales.
- Miss Julia Peyton-Jones, Director, Serpentine Gallery. For services to Art.
- Julie, Mrs. Jones, Director, Social and Community Services, Westminster City Council, London. For services to Social Care.
- Thomas Jones, M.B.E., Industrial Relations Organiser, Transport and General Workers Union. For services to the Disadvantaged in Wales.
- Professor James Roy Kearney, Honorary Professor of Voluntary Action Studies, University of Ulster. For services to the Voluntary Sector in Northern Ireland.
- Ms Philippa Kennedy, Consultant Editor, The Press Gazette. For services to Journalism.
- Ronald Critchley Kenyon. For services to the community, especially in Health and Education, in Nottingham.
- Dr. Alison Margaret Kerr. Paediatric Neurologist specialising in Rett Syndrome. For services to Medicine.
- Alan Edwin King. For services to the Church of England.
- Sir William Fettiplace Lawrence, Bt., Chairman, Heart of England Tourist Board. For services to the Tourist Industry.
- Nigel Gilbert Lawrie, Headteacher, Port Glasgow High School. For services to Education.
- Michael Jeffrey Leece, Chief Executive, National Marine Aquarium. For services to Tourism.
- Charles Edward Lister. For services to the Safety of Blood and Blood Products, Department of Health.
- Michael Raymond Lord, Executive Director, Sunjuice Ltd. For services to Industry in South Wales.
- Philip Albert Lovegrove. For services to the Church of England.
- Professor Philip David Lowe, Professor of Rural Economy and Founder of the Centre for Rural Economy at the University of Newcastle upon Tyne. For services to the Rural Economy.
- Michael Joseph Lyons, Chair, West Yorkshire Passenger Transport Authority. For services to Public Transport.
- Dennis Ivor Mabey, Member, Royal Institution of Chartered Surveyors, Rating and Local Taxation Policy Panel. For services to Public Valuation and Local Taxation.
- Ms Elizabeth Anne MacLean, Chair, Albyn Housing Society Limited. For services to the community in the Scottish Highlands.
- Iain MacLean MacSween. Chairman, Scottish Fishermen's Organisation. For services to the Fishing Industry.
- Kathleen Maria, Mrs. Maguiness, lately Chair, Board of Management, Cardonald College, Glasgow. For services to Further Education.
- The Venerable Ajahn Khemadhammo Mahathera, Spiritual Director of Angulimala. For services to Prisoners.
- Don Manley, J.P. For services to the Administration of Justice in the West Midlands.
- John Paul Marston, Sheriff's Officer. For services to High Court Enforcement.
- The Reverend Canon Jeremy Fletcher Martineau, National Rural Officer, General Synod Board of Mission. For services to the Rural Communities.
- Ingval Maxwell, Director, Technical Conservation, Research and Education Group, Historic Scotland.
- Michael McCabe, Director, Educational Services, South Ayrshire Council. For services to Education in South Ayrshire.
- Carol, Mrs. McCletchie. For services to Tyne and Wear Employer Coalition and the New Deal.
- Frederick James England McCrindle, Principal, Reading College and School of Arts and Design. For services to Further Education.
- Alastair McGowan. For services to Accident and Emergency Medicine.
- Fiona, Mrs. McMillan, Principal, Bridgwater College, Somerset. For services to Further Education.
- Paul Francis McNamara, Director and Head of Research, Prudential Property Investment Managers Ltd. For services to the Property Industry.
- Tanya Mary, Mrs. McWilliams. For public service.
- Professor Thomas Richard Miles. For services to People with Dyslexia.
- Richard Mills, Secretary General, National Society for Clean Air. For services to the Improvement of Air Quality.
- He ́le`ne Roberte, Mrs. Mitchell, Project Manager, Astronomy Project, National Maritime Museum. For services to Museum Education.
- Jean Hamilton Susan, Mrs. Mitchell. For services to the HALO Trust.
- Marlene Craigie, Mrs. Morley, Grade B1, Ministry of Defence.
- Miss Anne Jessie Mackenzie Morris, lately Head, Fife Educational Service. For services to Children and Young People with Sensory Impairments.
- Simon Morris, Principal Private Secretary to the Secretary of State for Wales.
- Kitty, Mrs. Hart-Moxon. For services to Holocaust Training and Education.
- Professor Elizabeth Murdoch, Emeritus Professor of Physical Education, Sports Science, Dance and Leisure, University of Brighton. For services to Physical Education and Sport.
- Professor Norman Cummings Nevin, Chairman, Gene Therapy Advisory Committee. For services to Gene Therapy Research.
- Janet Dianne, Mrs. Newton. For services to Education for Citizenship and the Teaching of Democracy in Schools.
- Christopher James Nicol, District Manager, Jobcentre Plus, Department for Work and Pensions.
- June, Mrs. Nisbet, Leader, School Government Team, School Admissions Organisation and Governance Division, Department for Education and Skills.
- Miss Stella O’Brien, Head, Senior Staffing and Succession, Cabinet Office.
- Miss Bernadette Ann O’Hare. For public service.
- William Edgar Oddie, Writer, Actor and Broadcaster. For services to Wildlife Conservation.
- Ms Elsie Margaret Akva Owusu, Founder Member, Society of Black Architects. For services to Architecture.
- Steve Packer, Deputy Director, Education for All Global Monitoring Report Team, Department for International Development.
- Professor Godfrey Henry Oliver Palmer, Professor, Heriot-Watt University. For services to Grain Science.
- Rosalie Parkinson, Grade B2, Ministry of Defence.
- Fraser Robertson Patrick, lately Director, Neighbourhood Resources and Development, Dundee. For services to Adult Education.
- Joan, Mrs. Patten, lately Chair, South East England Tourist Board. For services to the Tourist Industry.
- Paul Pegler, Leader, Facilities Contracts Management Team, H.M. Treasury.
- Simon Pellew, Managing Director, PECAN. For services to Unemployed People and to the community in South London.
- Dorothy Jean, Mrs. Penny, Associate Director of Redesign, NHS Modernisation Agency. For services to the NHS.
- Elizabeth Mary Kirby, Mrs. Phillips, Headteacher, St. Marylebone Church of England School, Westminster, London. For services to Education.
- Valerie, Mrs. Pitman. For services to the Duke of Edinburgh's Award Scheme in Northern Ireland.
- Jonathan Alexander Skoyles Pritchard, lately Divisional Science and Strategy Director, QinetiQ. For services to the Defence Industry.
- David Thomas Pugh, Secretary, Inter-Agency Committee on Marine Science and Technology. For services to Marine Sciences.
- Brigadier Hugh Pye, Chairman, Cancer and Leukaemia in Childhood. For services to the community in the South West.
- Margaret Pauline, Mrs. Quinn, Director of Midwifery, Blackburn, Hyndburn and Ribble Valley NHS Trust. For services to the NHS.
- Professor Patrick Donald Rayfield, Professor of Russian and Georgian, Queen Mary (and Westfield College), University of London. For services to Slav Culture and Language.
- Ms Jancis Mary Robinson, Writer and Broadcaster on Wine. For services to Broadcasting and Journalism.
- Peter Richard Rogers, Editor, The Grower Magazine. For services to Horticultural Journalism.
- Peter Rotheram. For services to Environmental Health.
- Ms Frances Ann Rumsey, Grade 7, Human Resources, The Pension Service, Department for Work and Pensions.
- Thomas Walker Sale. For services to the community in Alnwick, Northumberland.
- Frederick William Saunders, Chief Executive, East Staffordshire Borough Council. For services to Local Government in the West Midlands.
- Mary Lynne, Mrs. Saunders, Headteacher, Bettridge School, Cheltenham, Gloucestershire. For services to Children with Special Educational Needs.
- Ms Joanne Segars, Board Member, Occupational Pensions Regulatory Authority. For services to the Pensions Industry.
- Colin Trevor Shaw, lately Chief Executive, Devon and Cornwall Housing Group. For services to Housing in Devon and Cornwall.
- Stewart Anderson Sim, Operations Director, British Waterways. For services to Canals.
- Brian Simpson. For services to the Development of Eurocode Design Standards.
- Jagtar Singh, Deputy Chief Fire Officer, Bedfordshire Fire and Rescue Service. For services to Equal Opportunities in the Fire Service.
- Marie, Mrs. Skinner, Farmer and Conservationist. For services to Rural Economy and to Farming in East Anglia.
- Jane, Mrs. Smart, Executive Director, Plantlife International. For services to the Conservation of Wild Plants.
- Rodney Brian Hedley-Smith. For services to the Corporation of London.
- Sarabjeet Singh Soar. For services to Small Business in the West Midlands.
- Geoffrey Howard Sole, lately Senior Principal Surveyor, Lloyd's Register of Shipping. For services to Shipping.
- David Hunter Sparks, Member, Dudley Metropolitan Borough Council and Local Government Association. For services to Local Government.
- John Squires, D.L. For services to the community, especially the Tyne and Wear Foundation in the North East.
- Richard John Sterling, Managing Director, Coolkeeragh Group Ltd. For services to the Basic Skills Committee and Business in Northern Ireland.
- Alec James Stewart, M.B.E. For services to Cricket.
- David Stewart, Headteacher, Shepherd Special School, Nottingham. For services to Education.
- Stephen Stewart, Chief Executive, Coventry and Warwickshire Connexions Partnership. For services to Young People.
- Philip Street, Chief Executive Officer, Community Education Development Centre. For services to Community Education in the West Midlands.
- Paul Richard Streets, Chief Executive, Diabetes UK. For services to People with Diabetes.
- Professor Hugh Brown Sutherland, lately Honorary Adviser on Graduate Relations. For services to the University of Glasgow.
- David Ronald Swallow, Headteacher, Barry Comprehensive School, Vale of Glamorgan. For services to Education.
- Gerald Sweeney, Contact Centre Manager, East Kilbride, Inland Revenue.
- David Whitlock Tanner, Performance Director, Amateur Rowing Association. For services to Rowing.
- Ms Kathleen Tattersall, Director General, Assessment and Qualifications Alliance. For services to Education.
- Robin Harry Teague, Consultant Gastroenterologist, South Devon Healthcare Trust. For services to Medicine.
- Kenneth Olumuyiwa Tharp, Artistic Director, National Youth Dance Trust. For services to Dance.
- Edward John Thomas, lately Acting Chief Executive, Bro Taf Health Authority. For services to the NHS.
- Lilian Doris, Mrs. Thompson, M.B.E., J.P., Chairman, Blackpool Pleasure Beach Ltd. For services to the community in Blackpool, Lancashire.
- Caroline, Mrs. Thomson, Chairman, Highland NHS Board. For services to the NHS in Scotland.
- Hugh Gilmour Thomson, Director, Research and Consultancy Services, University of Strathclyde. For services to the Commercialisation of University Research.
- Glenys, Mrs. Timmons, Assistant Director, OYce of Science and Technology, Department of Trade and Industry.
- Dr. Gladys Mary Tinker, lately Consultant, Care of the Elderly, Cardiff and Vale NHS Trust. For services to the NHS.
- Ms Jennifer Mary Topper, Artistic Director, Hampstead Theatre. For services to Drama.
- Martin Turrell, Head of Branch, Judicial, Civil and Family Business Solutions, E-Delivery Group, Lord Chancellor's Department.
- Jef Aartse Tuyn, Head, Countryside Communications, Royal Agricultural Society of England. For services to the Royal Agricultural Society of England.
- Campbell Wilson Tweed, lately Chairman, Historic Monuments Council. For services to Historic Monuments Protection in Northern Ireland.
- Jhalman Singh Uppal, Chairman, Punjabi Culture Society and District Councillor, Telford and Wrekin. For services to Community Relations in Telford and Wrekin.
- Ms Dorma Jane Urwin, lately Principal, University College, Worcester. For services to Higher Education.
- Jack Vettriano, Artist. For services to the Visual Arts.
- Michael J. Viney. For services to UK Exports.
- Arnold Wagner, Chair of Governors, JFS School, Brent, London. For services to Education.
- Roy Belford Walker, Principal Child Care Manager. For services to Young People in the East Riding of Yorkshire.
- Sandra Ann, Mrs. Walton, Headteacher, Allens Croft Primary School, Birmingham. For services to Education.
- Alexander Bell Watson, Chief Executive, Angus Council. For services to Local Government.
- John White, Director, Group Technology, Royal Bank of Scotland. For services to the Banking Industry in Scotland.
- Bernard Whiting, Business Change Manager, Inland Revenue.
- John Spencer Wilkinson, lately Grade B2, Ministry of Defence.
- Bryan Peter Williams, Professor of Social Work, University of Dundee. For services to Social Work Education and Training.
- Ashley John Graham Winter, Chairman, Learning and Skills Council for Tyne and Wear. For services to Business in the North East.
- Roger Wood, Head, Data Quality Branch, Food Standards Agency.
- Kui Man Yeung, Director, Yang Sing Group. For services to Business in Manchester.

Diplomatic Service and Overseas

- Dr. Bruce Arnold. For services to journalism and UK-Irish relations.
- James Jose-Maria Arroyo. First Secretary, Foreign and Commonwealth Office.
- Richard Patrick Faithorn Barber. For services to international trade.
- David Murray Blake. For services to the India OYce Records.
- Rex Brown. For services to UK commercial interests in the Middle East.
- Edmund George Capon. For services to the promotion of British art in Australia.
- Piers William Alexander Cazalet, lately First Secretary, Foreign and Commonwealth OYce.
- Ms Anna Louise Clunes. First Secretary, UK Mission to the United Nations, New York.
- James Atchison Cogan, Founder and Director of Students Partnership Worldwide.
- Nancy, Mrs. Dargel. For services to Oxford University and the British community in Switzerland.
- Paul Dugan. For services to British business interests and the British community in Saudi Arabia.
- Michael John Elliott. For services to British journalism in the USA.
- David George Glasgow. For services to British commercial interests in Poland.
- Manzoor Hasan, lately Executive Director, Transparency International Bangladesh.
- Rosemary Eileen, Mrs. Hilhorst, Director, Connecting Futures project, British Council.
- Susan Elizabeth, Mrs. Hogwood, M.B.E., H.M. Ambassador, Kigali.
- Eric Jenkinson, lately First Secretary, British Embassy Tehran.
- David Nigel Kay. For services to British business interests and the British community in the USA.
- Lee Kirkham. For services to Save the Children in Africa.
- Ms Alison Lane. For services to disadvantaged children in Mexico.
- Kevin David Lewis, lately Director Bulgaria, British Council.
- Peter Baron Maynard. For services to the British and local communities in Ecuador.
- James Forbes McCulloch. For services to British exports.
- Professor David Paul Mellor. For services to British scholarship schemes overseas.
- Edris, Mrs. O’Neal. For services to the community, British Virgin Islands.
- Eric Albert Pearse Hughes. For services to UK-Mexican cultural relations and to the British community in Mexico.
- Richard Fowler Pelly. For services to the Budapest Festival Orchestra and to the British community in Hungary.
- Ms Emma Playfair, lately Executive Director Interights. For services to the promotion of human rights.
- Dr. Harry Lindsay Potter, DfID Natural Resources and Rural Livelihoods Adviser, Malawi.
- David Elliott Ritch, J.P. For public service, Cayman Islands.
- Michael Richard Rogers. For services to the British community and charities in Switzerland.
- Krishna Savjani, Honorary British Consul, Blantyre and Honorary Legal Adviser to the British High Commission Lilongwe.
- Ms Kristin Scott Thomas. For services to acting and to UK-French cultural relations.
- Nickleby Robin Duncan Tait. For services to British business interests in Australia.
- Linton Nathaniel Tibbetts. For services to the community, Cayman Islands.
- Commander John Martin Williamson Topp, Royal Navy (Retired). For services to the environment and conservation in the British Indian Ocean Territory.
- Graham Beverley Tullet. For services to ex-servicemen and to the British community in India.
- David Douglas Willey, BBC Correspondent, Rome.
- Alma, Mrs. Williams, lately member of the UK delegation to the European Economic and Social Committee.
- Mark Adrian Wilson, Honorary British Consul, Bali. For services to the victims of the Bali bombing.
- Philip John Wilson, Assistant to the Honorary British Consul, Bali. For services to victims of the Bali bombing.
- Ms Belinda Anne Irene Wright. For services to the protection of wildlife and endangered species in India.

==== Member of the British Empire (MBE) ====
Civilian Division

- Neil Adam, Janitor, Friockheim Primary School, Angus. For services to Education and to the community in Friockheim, Angus.
- Rosemary Annette, Mrs. Adams. For services to Libraries in Northern Ireland.
- Roy Adams. For services to the community in Londonderry.
- Isa, Mrs. Allan, Tea Lady. For services to Scottish Enterprise.
- Marie, Mrs. Allen, Head, The Fresh Start Faculty, Liverpool Community College. For services to Basic Skills Provision.
- Rosalind Clare, Mrs. Allsopp, Grade E1, Ministry of Defence.
- John Anderson. For services to Animal Health. Thomas Fraser Bews Anderson. For services to the community in Stromness, Orkney.
- Harry Ashley Andrews, J.P., Councillor, Caerphilly County Borough Council. For services to the community in Bargoed, South Wales.
- Francis Houlston Annett, Education Research Manager, Learning and Skills Council. For services to Training and Education in the North East.
- Ivor Alan Appleton, Retained Firefighter. For services to the community in Waltham, Grimsby.
- James Whiteford Arbuckle, J.P., Immediate Past Chairman, Royal Northern Countryside Initiative. For services to Agriculture and Rural Education.
- Robert Armstrong, Secretary and Founder Member, Abbey Historical Society. For services to Cultural Heritage in Northern Ireland.
- Keith Douglas Arnold, Design and Prepress Manager, Ordnance Survey, Office of the Deputy Prime Minister.
- Ms Stacey Atkinson. For services to Children with Learning Disabilities.
- Ms Irene Audain, Chief Executive, Scottish Out of School Care Network. For services to Out of School Care Services in Scotland.
- Jacqueline Dorothy, Mrs. Austin, Clinical Nurse Specialist, Nevill Hall Hospital, Abergavenny. For services to Cardiac Rehabilitation.
- Margaret Ann, Mrs. Backhouse. For services to the community, especially Health and Elderly People in Warwickshire.
- Malcolm Alan James Baker. For services to the community in Kidlington, Oxfordshire.
- George Gerald Edward Baldry. For services to the community in Merseyside.
- David Delius Anton Bantock. For services to the community, especially Education in Withywood, Bristol.
- Diana Elizabeth, Mrs. Barber. For services to the community, especially the League of Friends of Pembury Hospital, Kent, and the Osteopathic Centre for Children.
- Stuart Barber. For services to the community, especially the Waterloo Legal Advice Service, South London.
- Jennifer Christine, Mrs. Barnes. For services to Wells Cathedral Catering Ltd in Somerset.
- Kathleen Anne, Mrs. Barnett. For services to the Citizens’ Advice Bureau and to the community, South Somerset.
- Ann, Mrs. Bartleet. For services to the Council for the Protection of Rural England.
- Adolphus Leslie Bateson. For services to Elderly People in Somerset.
- Mark Grahame Batten. For services to the community, especially the Centre ’70 Community Association, Lambeth, South London.
- John Edgar Beach. For services to Music.
- Doreen, Mrs. Beardall. For services to Ruddington Framework Knitters Museum, Nottingham.
- Joseph Beattie, ChauVeur. For services to the Confederation of British Industry.
- Denise Sharon, Mrs. Bedford, Youth Worker, Kirklees Youth Services. For services to Young People in West Yorkshire.
- Miss Riaz Begum, Youth Worker, Asian Heritage Young People, Blackburn. For services to Young People.
- Ann, Mrs. Bell, Fishing Industry Co-ordinator, Aberdeenshire Council. For services to the Fishing Industry.
- Brian Wallace Bell, Grade C1, Ministry of Defence.
- Joyce, Mrs. Bellamy. For services to Garden History.
- Ms Vivienne Jane Bennett, lately Project Director, Imperial War Museum North, Manchester. For services to Museums.
- James Gordon Bennison. For services to Basketball.
- Christine, Mrs. Bentley, Matron, Queen Elizabeth The Queen Mother Hospital, Kent. For services to the NHS.
- Linda Jean, Mrs. Berwick. For services to People with Disabilities, especially the Lin Berwick Trust, Sudbury, Suffolk.
- David Michael Bills. For services to the National Trust and to the community in Kinver, West Midlands.
- Elizabeth Margaret, Mrs. Bishop. For services to the community in Tonyrefail, South Wales.
- Sehdev Parshad Bismal. For services to Community Relations in Wolverhampton.
- Ms Helen Black. For services to the Broadcasting and Creative Industries Disability Network (BCIDN).
- Robert Gillon Watson Black, Chairman, Caravan Club. For services to Caravaning and Tourism.
- Katharine Vera, Mrs. Bligh, lately Archivist, House of Lords.
- Alec Bloom, Chairman, Hospital Heartbeat Appeal. For services to People with Heart Disease.
- David Alexander Bolton, Director, Primary Care and Community Services Development, Lothian Primary Care Trust. For services to Health Care in Scotland. *David Bone. For services to the Boys’ Brigade Bandwork in Scotland.
- Margaret, Mrs. Bone. For services to the Royal British Legion, Buckinghamshire.
- Alice, Mrs. Booth, Member, Wales Parish Council. For services to the community in Rotherham, South Yorkshire.
- Miss Gillian Booth, Administrator, Competition Commission.
- Norman William Booth. For services to Sport in Redbridge and Essex.
- Thomas Edward Bourne, Environment Director, Welsh Development Agency. For services to Sustainable Development in South Wales.
- Ann, Mrs. Bowker. For services to Tourism in Cumbria. Victor Frederick Bowsher. For voluntary services to the community in East Devon.
- James McCall Boyd, lately Provost, East Ayrshire Council. For services to Local Government and to the community.
- Trevor Dempster Boyd. For services to Meteorology.
- David Richard James Boyton, lately Human Resources Adviser, H.M. Prison Belmarsh, H.M. Prison Service, Home Office.
- Rodney Winston Brache. For services to People with Disabilities in Guernsey.
- Patricia Mary, Mrs. Bradbury, J.P. For services to the Board of Visitors, H.M.Prison Blakenhurst, Redditch, Worcestershire.
- Geoffrey Braithwaite. For services to the community in Clitheroe and the Ribble Valley, Lancashire.
- Edward Francis Leopold Brech, Honorary Research Fellow, Management History Research Group, Open University Business School. For services to the History of British Management.
- Sydney Brewin. For services to the Citizens’ Advice Bureau, East Sussex.
- Helen Jennetta Adam, Mrs. Brewster. For services to the community in Dundee.
- John Stewart Briggs. For services to the Sea Cadet Corps, Keighley, West Yorkshire.
- John Christopher Brindle, Managing Director, J. Fishwick & Sons Ltd. For services to the Bus Industry.
- Henry Brisbane, Chairman, Shopmobility Scotland. For services to People with Disabilities in Scotland.
- Jean, Mrs. Britton, Day Hospital Manager, Walton Hospital, Chesterfield.
- Professor Alan John Brook. For services to the community, especially Music and Education in Buckinghamshire.
- Gary Brooker, Musician. For charitable services.
- Antony Charles Barrington-Brown. For services to Heritage and to the community in Codford, Wiltshire.
- Errol Brown, Singer. For services to Popular Music.
- George Herbert Brown, Chair of Governors, Oxhey First School and Kingsfield School, Stoke-on-Trent. For services to Education.
- Hamish Brown, Detective Inspector, Metropolitan Police. For service to the Victims of Harassment.
- Kenneth Brown, Business Manager, Medical Benefits Section, International Pension Centre, Department for Work and Pensions.
- Miss Deirdre Brownsell, Executive Officer, Department for Work and Pensions.
- Miss Gladys Bryan. For services to the National Children’s Homes and to the community of Upholland, Lancashire.
- Neil Anthony Buckley, Senior Teacher, Mathematics, Guthlaxton College, Leicestershire and Public Examiner, Assessment and Qualifications Alliance. For services to Education.
- Edward Alfred John Bull. For services to Maidstone Mediation.
- John Bulleyment, lately Sergeant, British Transport Police.
- John Spencer Burnett, Chairman, Board of Management, Oatridge Agricultural College. For services to Further Education in Scotland.
- Brian Gordon Burns, Strategic Manager, Mail and Distribution, Inland Revenue.
- Glenise Irene, Mrs. Burns, lately Scheme Manager, Methodist Homes Housing Association. For services to Sheltered Housing, Arbroath.
- Mervyn Burtch, President, KidsOp. For services to Music and Education in Wales.
- Samuel Butler. For services to the Industrial Development Board, Northern Ireland.
- Joseph Calzaghe. For services to Boxing.
- Isabel, Mrs. Campbell, Founder, Belles Organising and Secretarial Services. For services to Enterprise in Lochaber.
- Jane Elizabeth, Mrs. Cannon. For services to Business and Engineering.
- Dr. William Hugh Carling, President and Founder, Cardiac Rehabilitation and Support Group, Fareham, Hampshire. For services to Cardiac Patients.
- Michael Carney. For services to Amateur Boxing.
- Christopher Brian Carr. For services to the community in Dorking, Surrey.
- The Reverend Philip John Carrington, Hospital Chaplain, South Tees Hospitals NHS Trust.
- Annie Clelland, Mrs. Carson. For public service. Sandra Margaret, Mrs. Carter. For services to the Unemployed Voluntary Action Fund, Scotland.
- Adrienne Dianne, Mrs. Catherwood, D.L. For services to Action Research in Northern Ireland.
- Vera Eliza, Mrs. Catton, Chair, Cancer Research Campaign, Wandsworth and District Branch, London.
- Jean Thompson, Mrs. Caulfield, Beaver Scout Leader. For services to the community, Castlerock, County Londonderry.
- Betty, Mrs. Challis, School Crossing Warden, Witchford, Ely.
- Gopal Chandra. For services to Community Relations in Birmingham.
- Philip Alexander Chapman, Constable, Lincolnshire Police. For services to the Police and to the community in Alford, Lincolnshire.
- Miss Gillian Patricia Cheeseman, President of the Secretaries’ and Assistants’ Council, House of Commons.
- David Charles John Christie. For services to the Historic Environment and to the community of Hampstead, London.
- David Robert Church. For services to the Royal Mail and to the Scouting Movement in Norwich.
- Penelope, Mrs. Clarke, Senior Renal Care Assistant, Oxford RadcliVe Hospitals NHS Trust. For services to the NHS.
- Ruth, Mrs. Clarke, Honorary Secretary. For services to the RNLI, Colchester.
- Miss Mary Terez Clifford, Nurse Manager and Clinical Nurse Specialist, Rheumatology Unit, Musgrave Park Hospital, Belfast. For services to Nursing.
- Martin John Coates. For services to Young People in Seaforth, Merseyside.
- Miss Heather Ann Cole, Administrative Officer, New Deal Lone Parent Advisers, Department for Work and Pensions.
- Peter McMurray-Cole, Chairman, Gainsborough Decorations Ltd. For services to Charity, especially Health in Wales.
- Anita, Mrs. Collier, Project Manager, Sheffield Action Team, Department for Work and Pensions.
- Richard Francis Constantine, lately Coxswain/ Mechanic. For services to the RNLI, Scarborough.
- Harry Cook, President, Labrador Rescue Society. For services to Dog Welfare.
- Malcolm Coombs, Grade D, Ministry of Defence.
- Peter Thomas Cornwell, Administrative Officer, Department for Work and Pensions.
- Andrew Shaun Cousins, Assurance Officer, H.M. Customs and Excise.
- Gordon Cowan, J.P. For services to the community, especially to Young People in Sale, Cheshire.
- Miss Janet Rosemary Cox. For services to the Macmillan Cancer Relief Fund.
- William Ramage Cox, Member, Claythorn Community Council. For services to the community in Claythorn, Glasgow.
- Mollie, Mrs. Craig. For services to Erskine Hospital for Ex-Service Men and Women in Scotland.
- Patricia, Mrs. Creighton, Chair, Executive Committee, Croydon Voluntary Youth Sector. For services to Young People.
- Miss Margaret Rose Cresci, Head, Mental Health Nursing, Pontypridd and Rhondda NHS Trust. For services to Mental Health Nursing.
- William Edward Cromar, Secretary, National Fire Services Benevolent Fund. For services to Fire OYcers and their Families.
- Miss Ruth Iris Cronin, Administrative Officer, Jobcentre Plus, Department for Work and Pensions.
- Robert Johnstone Crosbie. For services to the Corporation of London.
- Ms Dianne Crowe, Specialist Gynaecology Nurse, Hexham General Hospital, Northumberland. For services to Women’s Health.
- Julie, Mrs. Crowson. For services to the community in Skegness and Wainfleet.
- John James Cubby, lately Chief Wildlife Ranger, Forestry Commission.
- Mervyn Albert Dane, Journalist, The Impartial Reporter, Enniskillen. For services to Journalism.
- Miss Elizabeth Margaret Davidson, Personal Secretary, Inland Revenue.
- Karen, Mrs. Davies, Chief Executive, Heart of England Fine Foods Group Ltd. For services to the Promotion of Regional Food.
- Richard Donald Davies, Archivist of the Russian Archive, Brotherton Library, University of Leeds. For services to Anglo-Russian Scholarship.
- Alison Apphia, Mrs. Denham-Davis. For services to the community, especially the Citizens’ Advice Bureau in Cirencester, Gloucestershire.
- Carol, Mrs. Davis, Caretaker and Support Assistant, Bulphan Primary School, Thurrock, Essex. For services to Education.
- Margaret, Mrs. Deeney, Scheme Co-ordinator, Oaklee Housing Association Limited. For services to Elderly People in Northern Ireland.
- Sydney Devine, Singer. For services to Entertainment in Scotland.
- Anne Alexandra, Mrs. Dey, lately Receptionist, Environment and Rural AVairs Department, Scottish Executive.
- Anne, Mrs. Diss, D.L. For services to the community, especially Community Action Furness, Barrow-in- Furness, Cumbria.
- Nora, Mrs. Dixon. For services to the community in Poulshot, Wiltshire.
- Christina Magdalena, Mrs. Dodd, Constable, West Mercia Constabulary. For services to the Police and to the community in Worcester.
- Fiona Bisset, Mrs. Dodds. For services to Homeless People and to the Citizens’ Advice Bureau, Hamilton.
- Ann, Mrs. Dowell, Enquiry Clerk, Avon and Somerset Constabulary. For services to the Police.
- John Drew, lately Brigade Procurement Officer, Wiltshire Fire Brigade. For services to the Fire Service.
- Edmund Ernest Ivor Drury. For services to the Royal Mail and to the community in Craigavon, Northern Ireland.
- Paul Erskine Dunn, Sergeant, Metropolitan Police. For services to the Police.
- Michael John Dunning, Head, Technical and Craft Training, AWE plc. For services to the Defence Industry.
- Iris, Mrs. Dunstan. For services to the community, especially the Pony Club and the RNLI, Cornwall.
- Charles Albert Dupont. For services to the Alderney Breakwater.
- Gilbert Ainslie Dures. For services to Older People in Bury, Lancashire.
- Simon Maxim Dyson. For services to Charity, especially to the Anthony Nolan Bone Marrow Trust.
- Elizabeth Jane, Mrs. Earle, Chair, School Friends Association and Governor, Roos Primary School, East Riding of Yorkshire. For services to Education.
- Jean Marie, Mrs. Eburne, President, Girlguiding, South West England. For services to Young People.
- Anthony John Edwards, Lloyds/TSB Retired Staff Liaison Officer. For services to Occupational Pensioners.
- Michael John Eke. For services to the community, especially to Young People in March, Cambridgeshire.
- Rahimah, Mrs. Elaheebucus, Range 8, Public Understanding of Science Team, Office of Science and Technology, Department of Trade and Industry.
- Frederick Joseph Elliott. For services to the Sea Cadet Corps, Scotland.
- Paul Marcellus Elliott. For services to Football and Community Relations in South East London.
- Brian Ellison, Assessment, Research and Educational Programme Manager, Mobility Advice and Vehicle Information Service, Department for Transport.
- Richard Elsey. For services to the community in Fotheringhay, Peterborough.
- Rebecca Desiree, Mrs. Elsy, J.P. For services to the Citizens’ Advice Bureau and to the community, South Tyneside.
- David Rowan Elwell, Communications Officer, Essex County Fire and Rescue Service. For services to the Fire Service.
- David Stuart English. For services to Charity.
- Clare Jennifer, Mrs. Evans. For services to the Wiltshire and Swindon Users’ Network and Disabled People.
- Miss Lynn Evans. For services to the Law Centres Federation, London.
- Richard George Evans, Deputy Headteacher, Copland Community School, Wembley, London. For services to Education.
- Joan, Mrs. Everard. For services to the Soldiers’, Sailors’ and Airmen’s Families Association, Barrow-in-Furness.
- Dreda Annette, Mrs. Farmer, Grade C2, Ministry of Defence.
- Jennifer, Mrs. Farr, D.L. For services to the NSPCC in Nottingham.
- Linda, Mrs. Faulkner, Reception and Security Manager, Facilities Management London, Commercial Services Division, Department for Education and Skills.
- James Fawcett, J.P. For services to the community and to the Licensed Taxi Trade in Newcastle-upon-Tyne.
- Piers William Trahern Feilden, Member, WaterVoice Wessex Committee. For services to Water Industry Customers.
- Peter Alexander Fell, Policy Adviser, Family Policy Division, Lord Chancellor’s Department.
- Albert Fellowes. For services to the community, especially Young People, in Rainhill, Merseyside.
- Kenneth Charles Fenton, Chairman, Welshpool and Llanfair Light Railway. For services to Tourism and to the community in Mid Wales.
- John Humphries Ferguson, Citybus Driver. For services to Transport in Northern Ireland.
- Aubrey Dukes Fielding. Campanologist and Ringing Master, St. Columb’s Cathedral, Londonderry. For services to Bell Ringing.
- Donald Joseph Filliston, Chairman, Sandgate Conservation Society. For services to Conservation, Storrington, West Sussex.
- Trevor John Fisher, Process Compliance Manager, United Utilities. For services to the Water Industry and to the community in the North West.
- Miss Mehru Fitter, Manager, Multicultural Library Services, Coventry. For services to the community.
- Houston Fleming, Chairman, Dykebar Hospital Patients’ Council, Renfrewshire. For services to Mental Health.
- Peter John Fletcher, Governor, Bideford College, Devon. For services to Education.
- William Robert Forde, Leading Chargehand Examiner, Ministry of Defence.
- Daphne Mary, Mrs. Foulsham, Vice President, National Gardens Scheme. For services to Charity.
- Gordon James Fowlie. For services to the community, especially Agriculture in Lewes, East Sussex.
- Douglas George Friend. Principal Officer, H.M. Young Offender Institution and Remand Centre Glen Parva, Home Office.
- Robert Francis Friend. For services to Broadcasting.
- Gwendolyn Dorothy Margaret, Mrs. Frost, Tailor to the Armed Forces.
- Susan Christine, Mrs. Fuller. For services to Science.
- Margaret Mary, Mrs. Gammon. For services to the community in Woking, Surrey.
- Barbara Dunbar, Mrs. Gartside. For services to the WRVS and to the community in Surrey.
- Alan Gear, Chief Executive, Henry Doubleday Research Association. For services to the Development of Organic Horticulture.
- Jacqueline, Mrs. Gear, Executive Director, Henry Doubleday Research Association. For services to the Development of Organic Horticulture.
- Peter Gibbons, Information Communication Technology Technician, Philips High School, Manchester. For services to Education.
- Heather, Mrs. Gibbs. For services to the community in Hampton, Middlesex.
- Dr. Angus Alexander Mackintosh Gibson, Chairman, Scottish Cot Death Trust. For services to Health.
- Sheila Anne, Mrs. Giles, Caseworker, Inland Revenue.
- Jean Mercedes, Mrs. Gooding, Governor, Haling Manor High School and Howard Primary School, Croydon, Surrey. For services to Education.
- Walter John Martin Gosling, Senior Probation OYcer. For services to the Probation and Prison Services in Norfolk.
- Bankim Chand Gossai. For services to Community Relations in South London.
- Jacqueline Ann, Mrs. Gough, Business Development Manager, Jobcentre Plus, Dudley, Department for Work and Pensions.
- Carolyne Isabelle, Mrs. Graham, Special Needs Educational Clerical Auxiliary, Lanark Grammar School. For services to Education.
- Hugh Scoolar Grant. For services to the Maintenance of Denmore Park, Aberdeen.
- Margaret Winifred, Mrs. Grant. For services to Nature Conservation, Stanford in the Vale, Oxfordshire.
- Belissa Mary Hunter, Mrs. Graves. For services to the community in East Bergholt, SuVolk.
- Eveline Ann, Mrs. Gray, Senior Dental Hygienist Tutor. For services to Dental Hygiene in Scotland.
- Miss Sally Jean Gray, Millennium Volunteers Ambassador. For services to Young People.
- Ronald Desmond Gregg. For services to the community in Belfast.
- Lyndsay Nairn Grewar. For services to Scouting in Kirriemuir, Angus.
- Joseph Paul Gribbon, Buildings OYcer, St. Bartholomew’s and the Royal London School of Medicine and Dentistry. For services to Higher Education.
- John Arthur Grimwood. For services to the community, especially the Petworth Town Band in West Sussex.
- Ernest Stillfried Guild, Director, British Wheelchair Athletics Association. For services to Disabled Sports.
- Ian Arthur Gunning, Constable, North Wales Police. For services to the Police.
- Miss Dorothy Mary Hadingham, Leader, Disabled Rangers Guides Trefoil Guild. For services to Disabled People in Croydon and District.
- Alice Marjorie, Mrs. Hale. For services to the community in Carshalton, Surrey.
- Rex David Hall, Education Consultant. For services to Study Support and Playing for Success.
- Richard John Hallam, Head, Music Service, Oxfordshire County Council and Chair, National Association of Music Educators. For services to Music Education.
- Sarah, Mrs. Hammonds. For services to the community, especially to St. Bartholomew’s Church, Blurton, Stoke-on-Trent.
- David Hanrahan, Complaints Manager, Inland Revenue.
- Eileen Barbara, Mrs. Hargreaves, Chair of Governors, Beauherne Community School, Canterbury, Kent. For services to Education.
- Dennis Harper. For services to the community, especially Young People in Bridlington, East Riding of Yorkshire.
- Frank Harper. For services to RAF Historical Research.
- Rex Arthur Harper, Voluntary Worker, RSPCA. For services to Wildlife in Cornwall.
- David John Harrigan, First Line Manager, Devonport Management Ltd. For services to the Defence Industry.
- Jacqueline, Mrs. Harris. For services to Housing and Regeneration in Bow, London.
- Derek Harrison, Branch Secretary, National Association of Retired Police Officers, Durham. For services to the Police.
- Barrie John Hartley, Senior Professional Technology OYcer, Policing and Crime Reduction Group, Home OYce.
- David John Hastings. For services to the community, especially Heritage in Norfolk.
- Ellen Margaret, Mrs. Hawkins, Grade E1, Ministry of Defence.
- Peter Philip Hawkins, Business Support Auditor, NAAFI. For services to the Ministry of Defence.
- Margaret, Mrs. Hayes. For services to the community, especially in the Belle Isle North Estate, Leeds.
- Rosemary Rebecca, Mrs. Hayes, J.P., Councillor, Pembrokeshire County Council. For services to the community in Pembrokeshire.
- Shirley, Mrs. Hayward, Head of School for Skills for Life and Learning, Yeovil College, Somerset. For services to Basic Skills.
- Gordon Stirling Henderson, Secretary, Scottish Outward Bound Association. For services to Young People.
- David Barclay Hilton. For services to the Earl Haig Fund.
- Jean Lesley, Mrs. Hinchliffe. For services to the community in Huddersfield, West Yorkshire.
- Norman Hilton Holland, Chairman, Business Link Berkshire and Wiltshire. For services to the Small Business Community.
- David Holt, Production Supervisor, BAE Systems. For services to the Defence Industry.
- Jane, Mrs. Hook, Chair, Scottish Society for Autism. For services to those affected by Autism.
- Paul James Hooley, J.P. For services to the community in Bedford.
- Susan Elizabeth, Mrs. Hooper. For services to the community in Saltash, Cornwall.
- June Audrey, Mrs. Hope. For services to Oxfam in Berkhamsted, Hertfordshire.
- Frederick Godfrey Howard, Head, Shellfish Hygiene Group, Fisheries Research Services, Marine Laboratory, Aberdeen.
- Ms Margaret Howell, Founder, Southend Women’s Refuge. For services to Tackling Violence against Women.
- John Rhys Howells, Senior Explosives Ordnance Detection Adviser, Thames Valley Police. For services to the Police.
- Michael John Hoy. For services to Education and to the Arts in the Isle of Man.
- Anthony Bruce Edward Hudson. For services to the Falkland Islands Memorial Chapel, Pangbourne, Berkshire.
- John Spencer Hudson, Chair, Partney and Dalby Parish Council. For Services to the community in Spilsby, Lincolnshire.
- Miss Glenys Hopwood Hughes. For services to the British Red Cross Society in Flintshire.
- Miss Patricia Ann Hughes. For services to People with Disabilities in North Wales.
- Ms Carrie Humble, Founder and Director, Thoroughbred Rehabilitation Centre. For services to Racehorse Welfare.
- Kenneth Ernest Humphrey, Project Director, Mornington Community Project. For services to the community in Belfast.
- Isabelle, Mrs. Hunter. For services to Young People in Ballynahinch, County Down.
- Yvonne Suzanne, Mrs. Huntriss. For services to the community, especially Bloxham Village Museum, Banbury, Oxfordshire.
- Hasanat Mohammad Husain. For services to Community Relations in East London and to the Education of Ethnic Minority Communities.
- Shafaquat Hussain, Co-ordinator, Khushi Project. For services to the Asian Community in the West Midlands.
- Shelim Hussain, Chairman and Managing Director, Eurofoods Ltd. For services to Business in Wales.
- Brian Hutchinson, Business Development Manager, The Prince’s Trust, East Midlands. For services to Young People.
- Peter William Hutley. For services to the community in Surrey.
- Ms Gloria Hyatt, Principal, Elimu Academy, Toxteth, Merseyside. For services to Education.
- Patricia, Mrs. Hyman. For services to the Citizens’ Advice Bureau, Aldershot, Hampshire.
- Bruno Imerini, Security Supervisor, OFSTED Headquarters. For services to Education.
- William John Jack. For public service.
- Miss Barbara Amy Bridget Jackson. For services to Ladies’ Golf.
- David John Jackson. For services to H.M. Coastguard, Cornwall.
- Harry Raymond Jackson. For services to the community, especially Sport in Humbleton, East Riding of Yorkshire.
- Rose, Mrs. Jackson, Founder Member, Gateway Club, Hessle, East Riding of Yorkshire. For services to Special Educational Needs.
- Caroline, Mrs. James, Staff Nurse, Frenchay Hospital, Bristol. For services to Nursing.
- Gwynedd Talfryn James. For services to Agriculture and to the Environment in South West Wales.
- John Peter Compton James, lately Chairman, Kennel Club. For services to the World of Dogs.
- Dr. William Robert Jenkinson, Director, Occupational Health and Safety, Bombardier Aerospace—Shorts Group. For services to Health and Safety in Northern Ireland.
- Mary, Mrs. Jenner, J.P. For services to Health and the community in Weybridge, Surrey.
- Robert Samuel Jennings, Principal, Slemish College, Ballymena, Co. Antrim. For services to Education.
- Miss Denise Ann John, Administrative Officer, Jobcentre Plus, Department for Work and Pensions.
- George Edward Johns. For services to Fostering, Devon.
- Gillian, Mrs. Johns. For services to Fostering, Devon.
- George Herbert William Johnson. For services to the community of Colwyn Bay and Conwy.
- Stanley James Johnson. For services to Heritage and Tourism in North Yorkshire.
- Michael Darius Bedford Leno Jonas. For services to Nature Conservation in Hertfordshire.
- Anne Frances, Mrs. Jones, Member, Mid Sussex District Council. For services to the community in Burgess Hill.
- David Jones. For services to Local Government and to the community in Denbigh, North Wales.
- The Reverend Edward Gwynfai Jones, lately Minister, St. Rollox Parish Church, Sighthill, Glasgow. For services to Race and Community Relations and Asylum Seekers.
- Elspeth Mary Margretta, Mrs. Jones. For services to Race and Community Relations and Asylum Seekers in Sighthill, Glasgow.
- Jeffrey Jones. For services to the community in Bridgend, South Wales.
- Joy, Mrs. Jones, Leader, Westbury Park Playgroup, Bristol. For services to Pre-School Education.
- William Randle Jones, Honorary Adviser, Duke of Edinburgh’s Award Scheme. For services to Young People in the West Midlands.
- Ian Paul Jordan, Emergency Planning and Community Safety Manager, Dumfries and Galloway Council. For services to Emergency Planning.
- Janet May, Mrs. Keel, lately Grade D, Ministry of Defence.
- Margaret Mary, Mrs. Kelly. For services to Crime Concern and the Youth Justice System.
- Robert Derek Kelsey, Chairman, UYngton White Horse Show. For services to Tourism in UYngton, Oxfordshire.
- Om Prakash Khanna, Chief Executive, Ethnic Minority Enterprise Centre, Glasgow. For services to Ethnic Minority Communities.
- Margaret Spreull, Mrs. Kinninmonth. For services to Guiding and to the Kirkcaldy Canoe Club, Fife.
- Miss Dorothy Kinrade, Business Impact and Measure Manager, H.M. Customs and Excise.
- Malcolm Carl Kleiman, Proprietor, Fairway School of Motoring. For services to People with Disabilities in Yorkshire.
- Charles Douglas Knott, lately Chief Commandant, Northumbria Police. For services to the Police.
- Stewart Lambie, Chairman, Arran Mountain Rescue Team. For services to Mountain Rescue.
- Frank Langford. For services to the community in Walsall, West Midlands.
- Olive, Mrs. Langford. For services to the community in Walsall, West Midlands.
- Joyce Ethel, Mrs. Langley. For services to the community in Lockleaze, Bristol.
- Hamilton Irvine Lavery, Transport Development Manager, Translink. For services to Transport in Northern Ireland.
- Arthur Abraham Lawson. For services to the Association of Jewish Ex-Servicemen and Women.
- Peter Foden Lee. For services to the community, especially Business in Brixworth, Northampton.
- Francis du Heaume Le Gresley. For services to the community in Jersey.
- Kenneth George Leggett. For services to Agriculture in Norfolk.
- Karel Lek. For charitable services to the NHS in North Wales.
- Elsie Mary, Mrs. Lewis, Union OYcial, National Union of Agricultural and Allied Workers. For services to the Agricultural Community.
- John Richard Lewis, Chair of Governors, Lamphey Primary School, Pembrokeshire. For services to Education.
- Margaret, Mrs. Lewis, lately Support Services Manager, South Pembrokeshire Hospital. For services to the NHS.
- Michael Stuart Limbrey, Chairman, Montgomery Waterway Restoration Trust. For services to Inland Waterways.
- Brian William Limbrick, Founder, Hitchin British Schools Project and Trust. For services to the History of Elementary Education.
- Gwynedd, Mrs. Lingard. For services to Gymnastics especially for Children with Special Needs.
- Sheila Jane, Mrs. Lloyd. For services to International Aid in Africa.
- Joyce Lillan, Mrs. Long. For charitable services to Southend Hospital NHS Trust.
- Catherine, Mrs. Love. For services to Guiding in Renfrewshire.
- Reginald Frank Lovelock, District Councillor, South Kesteven. For services to Local Government and to the community in Lincolnshire.
- Angus Stewart Lowden, Area Resource Manager, Meat Hygiene Service, Food Standards Agency.
- Ada Doreen, Mrs. Lowe. For services to the WRVS in Liverpool.
- David Holden Luscombe, Member, Birmingham City Council. For services to Local Government.
- John Laird Thomas Luscombe, Electrical Fitter, Devonport Management Ltd. For services to the Shipbuilding Industry.
- Eleanor May, Mrs. Lyall. For services to Scouting in Scotland and to the Linn Moor Residential School.
- Miss Kathleen Rose Lynch. For services to Garden History.
- Thomas Williamson Mabbott, Secretary, Royal Caledonian Horticultural Society. For services to Horticulture in Scotland.
- Dr. Sheena Lindsay MacDonald, Chair, Borders Local Health Co-operative, Berwickshire. For services to Medicine.
- John MacInnes, Area Assessor, Crofters Commission, Ross of Mull and Iona, Argyll. For services to Crofting.
- Desmond Gordon MacKey. For public service.
- Group Captain Alison Margaret MacKintosh, RAF (Rtd). For services to the RAF Benevolent Fund in Fife.
- Roderick John MacLeod, Piper. For services to Piping.
- Jeffrey Maddock, Managing Director, Simbec Research Ltd., Merthyr Tydfil. For services to Clinical Research in South Wales.
- Miss Debra Magill, Personal Secretary, H.M. Prison Liverpool, H.M. Prison Service, Home Office. For services to the Prison Service Charity Fund. *Rosemary, Mrs. Majer, lately Business Support Manager, Corporate Development Group, Cabinet Office.
- Ms Emma Mandley, lately Director, Regional Affairs, London Weekend Television. For services to Broadcasting.
- Marjorie, Mrs. Manton, B.E.M. For services to the WRVS and to the community in Horsham, West Sussex.
- Victor Charles John Marchant, Archaeologist. For services to Archaeology.
- Gerard Marsden, Entertainer. For services to Charity in Merseyside.
- Valerie, Mrs. Marsden, Senior Personal Secretary, Health and Safety Executive.
- Blanche Ellen Maggie Kirby, Mrs. Marsh. For services to the community in Somerset.
- Balraj Krishan Marwaha. For services to the Asian community in Scotland.
- Beryl, Mrs. Mason. For services to Sure Start, Early Years Education and Childcare, Telford, Shropshire.
- Naheed, Mrs. Arshad-Mather, J.P., Deputy Chair, Unity Housing Association. For services to the community in West Yorkshire.
- Richard Crichton Matthew, Chief OYcer, Merchant Navy Training Board. For services to the Shipping Industry.
- Mary, Mrs. Matthews. For services to Archery.
- Roger Bayley Maxwell. For public service.
- Thomas Maybin. For services to the community in Larne, County Antrim.
- Ronald Sidney McCall. For services to the Royal Air Force Association, Bedfordshire.
- Jean, Mrs. McCambley. For services to Young People in Belfast.
- Dorothy Muriel, Mrs. McCann. For services to the Citizens’ Advice Bureau, Birkenhead, Wirral.
- William Andrew McConnell. For public service.
- Anthony Peter McCoy, Jockey. For services to Horseracing.
- Mavis, Mrs. McCune. For services to Young People in Belfast.
- Gary McLaughlin. For services to Young People in Downpatrick, County Down.
- Malcolm Murdo McLean. For services to the community in Berneray, Isle of Lewis.
- Ann, Mrs. McMaster. For services to the Victims of Domestic Violence through the East Durham Women’s Refuge and East Durham Domestic Violence Forum.
- Angela, Mrs. McMullen. For services to People with Disabilities in Cambridgeshire
- Steven Mellers, Founder and Manager, Fairbridge Centre, Kent. For services to Young People.
- William Campbell Melville. For public service.
- Henrietta, Mrs. Menice. For services to Housing in Northern Ireland.
- Ms Valerie Metcalf. For services to Equal Opportunities.
- John Pollard Metcalfe, lately Chairman, Central Borders Branch, Multiple Sclerosis Society.
- Iona, Mrs. Meyer. For public service.
- Bambul Miah. For services to the community in the West Midlands.
- Mohammad Arju Miah. For services to community relations in Swindon, Wiltshire.
- Miss Lorraine Michaels. For services to Unemployed People in Merseyside.
- David Miller, Chairman of Governors, Wimbledon School of Art. For services to Higher Education.
- Lucy, Mrs. Miller. For services to the Girls’ Brigade in Cumbernauld.
- Uttambhai Dahya Mistry, J.P. For services to the community in Bolton.
- Mary, Mrs. Mitchell, Home Help. For services to the services to Archaeology. community in Banbridge, Co Down.
- Miss Patricia Ann Moir, Nurse, Accident and Emergency Department, Royal Aberdeen Children’s Hospital. For services to Families in Grampian.
- Miss Isobel Montgomery, Senior Clerical Assistant, James Hamilton Academy, Kilmarnock. For services to Education.
- Ronnie Moodley, Chief Executive, ARHAG Housing Association. For services to Refugees.
- Annie Allan Stevenson, Mrs. Mooney. For services to the community in Stirling.
- Ronald David Moore, Court Manager, Canterbury Combined Court Centre, Court Service, Lord Chancellor’s Department.
- Catherine Denise, Mrs. Morgan, Headteacher, Goetre Infants School, Merthyr Tydfil. For services to Education.
- Daniel Edward Morgan, J.P. For services to the Administration of Justice in Herefordshire.
- David Treharne Morgan, T.D. For services to Transport Preservation in the UK and Europe.
- June, Mrs. Morrell, Administrative OYcer, West London County Court, Court Service, Lord Chancellor’s Department.
- Elizabeth Pearl, Mrs. Morrison, Curriculum Director, Fermanagh College. For services to Further Education.
- Thomas Hulme Moss. For services to Dance in Wigan, Lancashire.
- Ellen, Mrs. Mulvey. For services to Ex-Service Personnel in Broughton House Home, Salford.
- Mary Bernadette, Mrs. Munden (Mrs. Gilbert), Nursery Nurse, Claremont School, Bristol. For services to Special Needs Education.
- Barbara Margaret, Mrs. Murray. For services to the Women’s Royal Voluntary Service in Fort Augustus.
- Robert Jack Nelson. For services to Unemployed People in the East Midlands.
- David Newbigging, Rehabilitation Instructor, State Hospital, Carstairs. For services to Patient Therapy.
- Patricia, Mrs. Newman, Youth Worker, Youth and Community Education Service. For services to Young People in Walsall, West Midlands.
- Reginald Nicholas. For services to People with Disabilities in Cornwall.
- William James Nicholl. For public service.
- Alan Nicolson. For services to the community in Banffshire.
- Lawrence Michael Nippers. For services to Local Government in Wales.
- Cyril Charles Norman, lately Parish Clerk. For services to Local Government in Eastham, Worcestershire.
- John Michael Nugent. For services to Education, Skills and Business in Greater Manchester.
- Margaret Mavis, Mrs. Nutter. For services to the community, especially the Springhall Hospice Charity Shop, Rochdale, Lancashire.
- Helen, Mrs. Ogborn. For services to the Victim Support Scheme, Tameside.
- Jamie Trevor Oliver, TV Chef and Restaurateur. For services to the Hospitality Industry.
- Patrick John Ormonde. For services to Amateur Theatre.
- Malcolm Douglas Osmundson, School Resource Manager, School of Biomedical Sciences, King’s College, London. For services to Higher Education.
- Rhoda, Mrs. Ottoway. For services to Ridge Meadow Primary School, Chatham, Kent. For services to Education.
- Hazel Ann, Mrs. Oughton, School Crossing Warden. For services to the community in Frodsham, Cheshire.
- Victoria, Mrs. Ouzman, Senior Personal Secretary, Police Complaints Authority, Home Office.
- Cecile, Mrs. Oxaal, English Teacher, Winifred Holtby School, Hull. For services to Education.
- Linda Anne, Mrs. Paice, Complaints Co-ordinator, Broadcasting Standards Commission.
- Iris Mona, Mrs. Pain, Typist, Employment Tribunals Service, Department of Trade and Industry.
- Angela, Mrs. Palmer, Nursery Nurse, Northfield Road Primary School, Dudley, West Midlands. For services to Education.
- Marilyn Peggy, Mrs. Palmer, Manager, International Trade Services, Bristol Chamber of Commerce and Initiative. For services to International Trade.
- Phyllis Ann, Mrs. Palmer, Founder Member, South Cumbria Dyslexia Association. For services to Special Needs Education in Cumbria.
- Keith Pape, Constable, West Yorkshire Police. For services to the Police.
- Michael John Millard Parker, T.D., Emergency Planning Adviser, Severn Trent Water. For services to the Water Industry.
- Gordon John Parris, J.P. For charitable services, Surrey. Betty Joan, Mrs. Patchett. For services to Skipton Hospitals’ League of Friends.
- Wendy, Mrs. Paterson, Development Officer, South East Scotland Training Consortium. For services to Social Work in Scotland.
- Dr. Binay Kumar Pathak, General Medical Practitioner, Nottingham. For services to Primary Health Care.
- David Anthony Pearman. For services to the Conservation of British Flora and to the Botanical Society of the British Isles.
- Marion, Mrs. Pearson, Head of Finance, Glasgow Film Theatre. For services to the Cinema.
- Eleanor, Mrs. Perkins. For services to the Soldiers’, Sailors’ and Airmen’s Families Association, Bristol.
- Graham Alan Perry, Founder Member, Great Western Society. For services to Railway Heritage.
- Ms Sharon Peters, Team Leader, FCH Housing and Care. For services to Housing in the West Midlands.
- Lawrence Erling Petterson. For services to Charity especially Health in South Wales.
- John Philcox, Head of Personnel, Engineering and Physical Sciences Research Council.
- Alan Phillips. For services to charity in Jersey.
- The Venerable Galayaye Piyadassi. For services to Community Relations in North London.
- Stuart James Pizzey, Constable, Greater Manchester Police. For services to the Police and to the community.
- William Alfred Place, Messenger, Government Office for Yorkshire and Humber.
- Keith Andrew Player, Grade C1, Ministry of Defence.
- Vera Kenton, Mrs. Plummer. For services to the WRVS and to the community in East London.
- Annabelle Elizabeth, Mrs. Poots, Founder Member, Lisburn Special Care School Parents’ Association. For services to the community in Lisburn, Co Antrim.
- Edward George William Powell, Station Honorary Secretary. For services to the RNLI, Barry, South Glamorgan.
- Michael William Powley. For services to Supported Employment in the South West.
- Christine Joyce, Mrs. Price. For services to International Development.
- Maureen, Mrs. Pritchard, Cleaner. For services to the Royal Institution of Chartered Surveyors.
- John Alan Prodger. For services to the community in Buckinghamshire.
- Peter Joseph Prunty, Force Commandant, Cleveland Special Constabulary. For services to the Police.
- Angelina, Mrs. Purcell. For services to Business Development and International Trade in South London.
- Stella Rosamond, Mrs. Pye, Personal Assistant to the Vice Chancellor, University of East Anglia. For services to Higher Education.
- Steve Pyke, Photographer. For services to the Arts.
- Raymond Paul Quant. For services to the community in Borth, Ceredigion.
- Robin Radley. For services to the NSPCC and to the Treloar Trust in Hampshire.
- Eric James Rainey, lately National Trust Area Warden. For services to the Conservation of Wildlife in Strangford Lough, Northern Ireland.
- Mehmet Ramadan, lately Lift Attendant, Palace of Westminster.
- Catherine Quinn Katie, Mrs. Ramage, Director, Community Involvement Ltd, Larkhall. For services to People with Special Needs in Lanarkshire.
- Peter Rana. For services to Business and International Trade.
- Graeme Donald Randall. For services to Judo.
- Robert Eric Michael Randall. For services to Karate.
- Richard Nisbet Earle Raven. For services to the community in Shrewsbury, Shropshire.
- Peter Raymond, Non-Executive Chairman, Tepnel Life Sciences. For services to the UK Bioscience Sector.
- Violet Margarethe Alice, Mrs. Reader. For services to the community in Sutton, Norfolk.
- Janet, Mrs. Reynolds, Managing Director, Octavius Hunt Ltd. For services to International Trade.
- Joan, Mrs. Reynolds. For services to the community in South East Wales.
- Maurice Edward Reynolds. For services to People with Learning Difficulties and Prader-Willi Syndrome.
- Peter Robert Richardson, Teacher, Haycliffe Special School, Bradford. For services to Special Needs Education.
- Eileen, Mrs. Riddick, Management Secretary, Scottish Prison Service.
- Major Peter Harold Ridlington. For services to the Gurkha Welfare Trust.
- Nicholas Riley. For services to UK Geosciences.
- Mohummad Risaluddin. For services to Interfaith Relations.
- Cecil Ritchie. For services to Road Safety.
- Glynn Morton Roberts, Head, Birmingham Outdoor Education Centre, Birmingham City Council.
- Marian, Mrs. Roberts, Councillor. For services to the community in Blaenau Gwent, South Wales.
- Robert Sommerville Robertson, Driver, Fleet Support Ltd. For services to the Defence Industry.
- Andrew John Robinson, Head, Community Development Banking, NatWest and Royal Bank of Scotland. For services to Social and Community Enterprise.
- Martin Joseph Roddy, Constable, Gloucestershire Constabulary. For services to the Police.
- Alexander Philip Roe, Constable, West Midlands Police. For services to the Police and to Charity.
- Jean Valentine, Mrs. Rogers. For services to the WRVS in Dorset.
- Audrey Watkin, Mrs. Rose. For services to the community, especially Health and Education in Sheffield.
- Elvina Sheila, Mrs. Russell, Chairman, Pembrokeshire Community Health Council. For services to Health.
- Philip Ralph Hugh Russell, B.E.M., Grade C2, Ministry of Defence.
- Philip Sackett, lately Clerk, Minster Parish Council. For services to the community in Minster, Thanet, Kent.
- Miss Dora Mary Sales. For services to the community in Usk, Monmouthshire.
- Dilip Sarkar. For services to Aviation History.
- Yvonne Janet, Mrs. Saunders, Divisional Administration Officer, Hampshire Constabulary. For services to the Police.
- Alan Samuel Schwartz, Member, Welsh Interfaith Council and Board of Deputies of British Jews. For services to Interfaith Relations and to the Jewish Community in Wales.
- James Scott. For services to the community and to the Royal Mail, Bracknell, Berkshire.
- Dr. Matta Venkataramanaiah Shathrughna Setty, General Medical Practitioner, Ashford, Kent. For services to Primary Health Care.
- Kathryn, Mrs. Severn. For services to the community in Llanfairpwll, Anglesey.
- Eric James Seymour. For services to the Royal British Legion in Essex.
- Robina Shahnaz Shah, J.P. For services to Asian Children with Learning Disabilities.
- Samir Sharma. For services to Community Relations in Scotland.
- Doreen Elizabeth, Mrs. Sharpe. For public service.
- Judith Craig, Mrs. Shedden, Co-Founder, Grown Up Congenital Heart Patients Association. For services to People with Congenital Heart Disease.
- Imelda, Mrs. Shelley, Research Information Officer, Wales Tourist Board. For services to Tourism.
- Peter Edwin Sillibourne. For services to Ruckinge and Hamstreet Scout and Guide Associations, Kent.
- Tennakoon Mudilige Dayananda Silva, Civil Engineer. For services to Public Transport in London.
- Marion, Mrs. Simon, J.P. For services to Trade Unions and Workplace Learning Services, Yorkshire and Humberside.
- Pamela, Mrs. Simpson. For services to the Citizens’ Advice Bureau, Richmond, Surrey.
- John Roger Sims, Secretary, League of Friends, Royal Orthopaedic Hospital, Birmingham. For services to Health.
- Amolak Singh, Chief Executive, Dental Practitioners’ Association. For services to Dentistry.
- Simon Singh. For services to the Promotion of Science, Technology, Engineering and Maths in Schools and to Science Communication.
- Sylvia, Mrs. Sklayne. For services to the community in Redbridge, Essex.
- Daphne Mary Walker, Mrs. Sleigh, lately Councillor, City of Edinburgh Council. For services to Local Government and to the community.
- Thomas Kay Slimming, Lecturer, Stow College, Glasgow. For services to Special Needs Further Education.
- Robert William Sly, New Deal Co-ordinator and Operations Manager, Dorset, Department for Work and Pensions.
- Alan John Smith, Licensing Officer, Environment Agency. For services to Water Resource Management.
- Barry Lewis Smith, Recovery Manager and Deputy Unit Head, Inland Revenue.
- Christine Annette, Mrs. Smith. For services to the community, especially to Music in Nottingham.
- Eileen Annie Elizabeth, Mrs. Smith. For services to the Sea Cadet Corps, Southampton.
- Gillian Elizabeth, Mrs. Smith. For services to Community Safety.
- Ian Monro Smith, Inspector, Invercannie Water Treatment Works. For services to the Scottish Water Industry.
- Malcolm Smith. For services to the Board of Visitors, H.M. Prison Lancaster.
- Martin Ansdell-Smith, Senior Network Analyst, Information Services Division, Department for Education and Skills.
- Robert William Smith. For services to Community Safety.
- Terence Henry Rosslyn Smith. For services to Disadvantaged People.
- Alan John Spedding, Director of Music, Beverley Minster. For services to Music.
- Judith, Mrs. Spicer, Pensions Team Leader, Department for Work and Pensions.
- Penny, Mrs. Spink. For services to British Fencing.
- Brian Francis Squires. For services to the community in Linton, Herefordshire.
- Richard Charles Squires, D.L. For services to the community, especially conservation in Wantage, Oxfordshire.
- John Malcolm Stansfield. For services to Agriculture and to the community in Reading.
- Barry Steed. For services to the community in Bournemouth and Poole, Dorset.
- Sheila, Mrs. Steele, J.P. For services to Girlguiding UK and to the community in Stoke-on-Trent, Staffordshire.
- Dr. David Brook Stevens. For services to Motor Sport Medicine in the Isle of Man.
- Alfred Davison Stewart, Biomedical Scientist Manager, Belfast Link Laboratories. For services to the Laboratory Service.
- Joyce, Mrs. Stewart, lately Director of Horticulture, Royal Horticultural Society. For services to Horticultural Science and Botanical Education.
- Robert Watt Stewart, Manager, Jobcentre Plus, Department for Work and Pensions.
- John David Stockport, Constable, North Yorkshire Police. For services to the Police.
- Cyril David Stockwell, Member, Sparsholt Parish Council and Member, Royal Institution of Chartered Surveyors. For services to Local Government in Sparsholt, Hampshire.
- Diane Maureen, Mrs. Stone, Co-ordinator, Community Action Centre, University of the West of England. For services to Higher Education.
- Patricia, Mrs. Stringfellow, Chair, Judging Panel, National Training Awards. For services to Training.
- Carole Hester, Mrs. Sturgess. For services to Mental Health Care in Swansea.
- Mohammed Ali Syed. For services to Community Relations in South West London.
- Abu Taher. For services to Community Relations in the Midlands.
- Michael Tangye. For services to Heritage in Cornwall.
- Roger John Radcliffe Tanner, D.L. For services to the Arts in Saddleworth, Oldham.
- Brian Taylor, Secretary, Open Door Project, Redbridge, Essex. For services to Young People.
- Charles Edward Taylor, Town Councillor, Presteigne and Norton Town Council. For services to the community in Presteigne, Powys.
- Charles Harry Taylor, T.D. For services to the community, especially the Trinity Centre in Winchester, Hampshire.
- Miss Jacqueline Taylor. For services to the community of Saltburn-by-the-Sea, Yorkshire.
- Jean, Mrs. Tennant. For services to Marie Curie Cancer Care.
- Alfred Keith Dyson Terry. For services to Tramways and Tramcar Heritage.
- Giles Eric Tewkesbury. For services to Young People.
- Jayprakash Thakkar, Facilities Officer, H.M. Customs and Excise.
- Angela, Mrs. Thomas. For services to Elderly People with Disabilities in Desford, Leicestershire.
- Carmen Teresa, Mrs. Thomas, Youth Leader, Kingsteignton Youth Centre, Devon. For services to Young People.
- George James Thomas. For services to the Royal Mail and to the community in Shrewsbury.
- Joyce Helen, Mrs. Thomas. For services to the community in Ross-on-Wye, Herefordshire.
- Andrew Edward Thompson. For services to the community in Bangor, Co Down.
- Anne, Mrs. Thompson, Principal, Currie Primary School, Belfast. For services to Education.
- Miss Diane Hilary Thompson, Personal Assistant to Chairman and Chief Executive, Alvis plc. For services to the Defence Industry.
- Henry Andrew Thompson. For services to the community in Coleraine, Co Londonderry.
- Janice Ann, Mrs. Thompson, Regional Co-ordinator, Investors in People, Inland Revenue.
- Kenneth Clive Thomson. For services to the British Red Cross Society in Orkney.
- Terry Timlett. For services to the community in Devon.
- Elizabeth, Mrs. Toman. For services to Social Welfare in Northern Ireland.
- Jane Emily, Mrs. Tomlinson. For charitable services in West Yorkshire.
- James Alan Tompkins, lately Premises Manager, Langbourne Primary School, Southwark, London. For services to Education.
- William Ian Tootell. For services to the Romanian Childline.
- Cyril Trust. For services to the community in Farnham, Surrey.
- Mary Ruth, Mrs. Tucker, Adult Education Tutor, Neath. For services to Lifelong Learning.
- John Turley. For services to Life Saving in Lanarkshire.
- Barbara, Mrs. Turnbull. For services to the Citizens’ Advice Bureau, Clackmannanshire.
- Elsie Ellen, Mrs. Tytherleigh. For services to the WRVS in Essex.
- Romesh Vaitilingam. For services to Economic and Social Science.
- Kenneth Venables, Community Safety Manager, Basildon District Council. For services to the Police and to the community.
- Miss Diane Wadsworth, Manager. For services to London Underground.
- Paul Gerald Wagstaff, Principal Lecturer, Aeronautics, Kingston University. For services to Higher Education.
- Suzanne Frances, Mrs. Walsh. For services to the Homeless in Blackpool.
- Suzanne, Mrs. Warn, Public Examiner, Geography for Edexcel. For services to Education.
- Timothy John Wass, RSPCA Superintendent, East Anglia. For services to Animal Health and Welfare.
- Joseph Callander Watson. For services to the community, especially the Willow Burn Hospice in Lanchester, County Durham.
- John Blakeney Waugh, Principal, Wheatfield Primary School, Belfast. For services to Education.
- Jack Webber. For services to the National Trust.
- Allan Andre Wells, Joiner, Ministry of Defence.
- Miss Kathleen Rita Welsh. For services to People with Disabilities in Scotland.
- David West, lately Education and Training Adviser, Scottish Engineering. For services to the Engineering Industry in Scotland.
- Ron West, Technical Manager, Environment Agency. For services to the Environment.
- Ms Sally Margaret West. For services to Age Concern.
- Helen, Mrs. White, School Crossing Warden, Christchurch, Dorset.
- Nicholas Charles Whitney, Head, Technical Support, Westland Helicopters. For services to the Aviation Industry.
- Ian Whittingham. For services to Health and Safety in the Construction Industry.
- Thomas John Whyatt, Managing Director, Continental Teves UK Ltd, Ebbw Vale. For services to Industry in Wales.
- Clare, Mrs. Wichbold, Local Government Officer. For services to Rural Herefordshire.
- Helen Irvine Adair, Mrs. Wickens, Constable, Norfolk Constabulary. For services to the Police.
- Pauline Rosemary, Mrs. Wilkinson. For services to the community in Chesham, Buckinghamshire.
- Mary Yvonne, Mrs. Williams, Grade D, Ministry of Defence.
- Margaret Mary, Mrs. Williamson. For services to the community in Congleton, Cheshire.
- Bernice Joan, Mrs. Willis, Leader, Oswestry Borough Council and Chairman, Memorial Hall Trust. For services to the community in Oswestry, Shropshire.
- Joyce, Mrs. Willis, Teaching Assistant, Willoughby School, Bourne, Lincolnshire. For services to Special Education Needs.
- Alwyn Peter Wilson. For public service.
- Frank Robert George Wilson, Boys’ Brigade Leader. For services to Young People in Sunderland.
- John Douglas Wilson. For services to Beekeeping.
- Margaret, Mrs. Wilson. For services to Young People and to the community in Edinburgh.
- Patricia June, Mrs. Wilson, Waste Technical Officer, Environment Agency. For service to Waste Management.
- Ronald David Wilson. For services to the Far East Prisoners of War Association.
- William John Connor Wilson, Director, Technical Services, Belfast Harbour Commissioners. For services to the Port Industry.
- Eric Gordon Winterflood. For services to Conservation and to the community in Cambridge.
- Zbigniew Wojcik, Racial Equality OYcer, Derby Racial Equality Council. For services to the New Deal.
- Danny Wai-Ching Wong, Chair, Chinese Welfare Association and Chamber of Commerce. For services to the Chinese Community in Northern Ireland.
- Raymond Wong. For services to Community Relations in Bristol.
- Bryen Norman David Wood, Honorary Curator, Bushey Museum and Art Gallery. For services to Heritage.
- Joanna, Mrs. Woodd. For services to Victims of Crime in Lambeth, London.
- Stephanie Janice, Mrs. Woodruff. For services to British Exports.
- Alan Wright, Mechanical Fitter, Thames Water. For services to the Water Industry.
- Peter Andrew Thomson Wright. For services to The Duke of Edinburgh’s Award Scheme in Edinburgh and Lothian.
- Anne Monica Gordon, Mrs. Wyburd. For services to the Criminal Justice System in Hertfordshire.
- Margaret Doreen, Mrs. Wylde. For services to Amateur Operatic Societies in Farnham, Surrey.
- Jacqueline, Mrs. Yong, Typist, Jobcentre Plus, Department for Work and Pensions.
- Maureen, Mrs. Young. For services to Save the Children in Berkshire.
