= Robin Miller =

Robin Miller may refer to:

- Robin Miller (nurse) (1940–1975), also known as the "Sugarbird Lady", Australian aviator and nurse
- Robin Miller (journalist) (1949–2021), American motorsports journalist
- Robin Miller (technology journalist) (1952–2018), also known as "Roblimo", American journalist specializing in technology
- Robin Miller (chef) (born 1966), American television personality and food writer
- Robin Miller (businessman), British businessman

== See also ==
- Robyn Miller (born 1966), co-founder of Cyan Worlds, the creators of the Myst computer game
- Robin Millar (disambiguation)
