= John Mogg =

John Mogg is the name of:

- John Mogg, Baron Mogg, British civil servant and later a life peer
- Sir John Mogg (British Army officer), senior British Army officer who also held NATO command positions
