= Chris Banks =

Chris Banks may refer to:

- Chris Banks (politician)
- Chris Banks (poet) (born 1970), Canadian poet
- Chris Banks (footballer, born 1965), English former professional footballer
- Chris Banks (athlete) (born 1978), American marathon runner
- Chris Banks (American football) (1973–2014), former American football guard for the Denver Broncos
- Christopher Banks (born 1977), New Zealand journalist, musician, record producer, songwriter and filmmaker
- Chris Banks (businessman) (born 1959), British businessman
