= James Arroyo =

British diplomat (born 1967)

James Arroyo OBE (born 25 March 1967) has served as the Director of the Ditchley Foundation since September 2016.

== Education ==
Arroyo attended Loughborough Grammar School in Leicestershire, and obtained a BA in English from Jesus College, Cambridge.

== Career ==
Prior to joining the Ditchley Foundation, Arroyo served as a diplomat, national security official and civil servant. From 2012 to 2016, he was Director for Data at the British Foreign and Commonwealth Office (FCO). Previously, he acted as Director for Europe in the FCO and served abroad in embassies in France and across the Near East.

His areas of expertise include the impact of technology on society, business and government and the dynamics of insurgencies and terrorism.

== Honours ==
Arroyo was appointed Officer of the Most Excellent Order of the British Empire (OBE) in the Queen's 2003 Birthday Honours for services to diplomacy.

== Personal life ==
He is married to Kerry Arroyo with whom he has two daughters.
