= Robin Millar =

Robin Millar may refer to:

- Sir Robin Millar (producer), English record producer, musician and businessman
- Robin Millar (politician), British politician

== See also ==
- Robin Miller (disambiguation)
