= Philip Stephens (journalist) =

English journalist and author

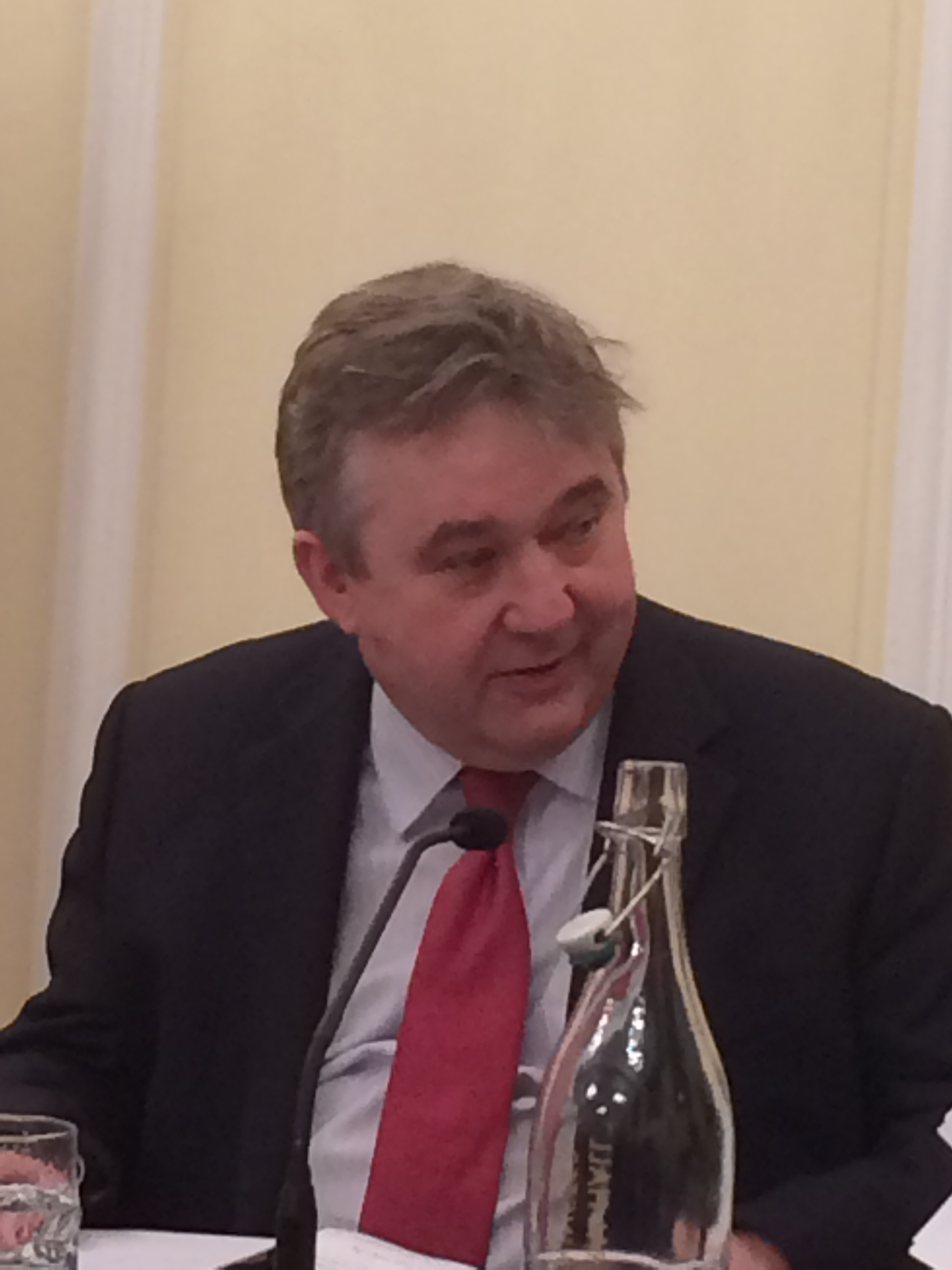
Philip Stephens at Central Hall Westminster, London, 2015

Philip Stephens (born 2 June 1953) is an English journalist and author.

== Biography ==
Philip Stephens is associate editor, chief political commentator, and director of the editorial board of the Financial Times. He writes a weekly column for the FT. He was educated at Wimbledon College and at Oxford University, where he took an honours degree in modern history. He joined Reuters as a correspondent in London and Brussels before moving to the Financial Times newspaper in 1983. There he has worked as economics editor, political editor and editor of the UK edition.

He is vice-chair of the trustees of the Ditchley Foundation and member of the board of the Franco-British Colloque. He has won several journalism prizes, including Political Journalist of the Year in the British press awards, The David Watt prize, and the Political Studies Association Political Journalist of the Year. He wrote the book Politics and the Pound, a study of the management of exchange rates by the British Government, and its relations with Europe since 1979. He also wrote a biography of Tony Blair, when the latter was British Prime Minister.
