= Ditchley Foundation =

Foundation with a focus on British-American relations

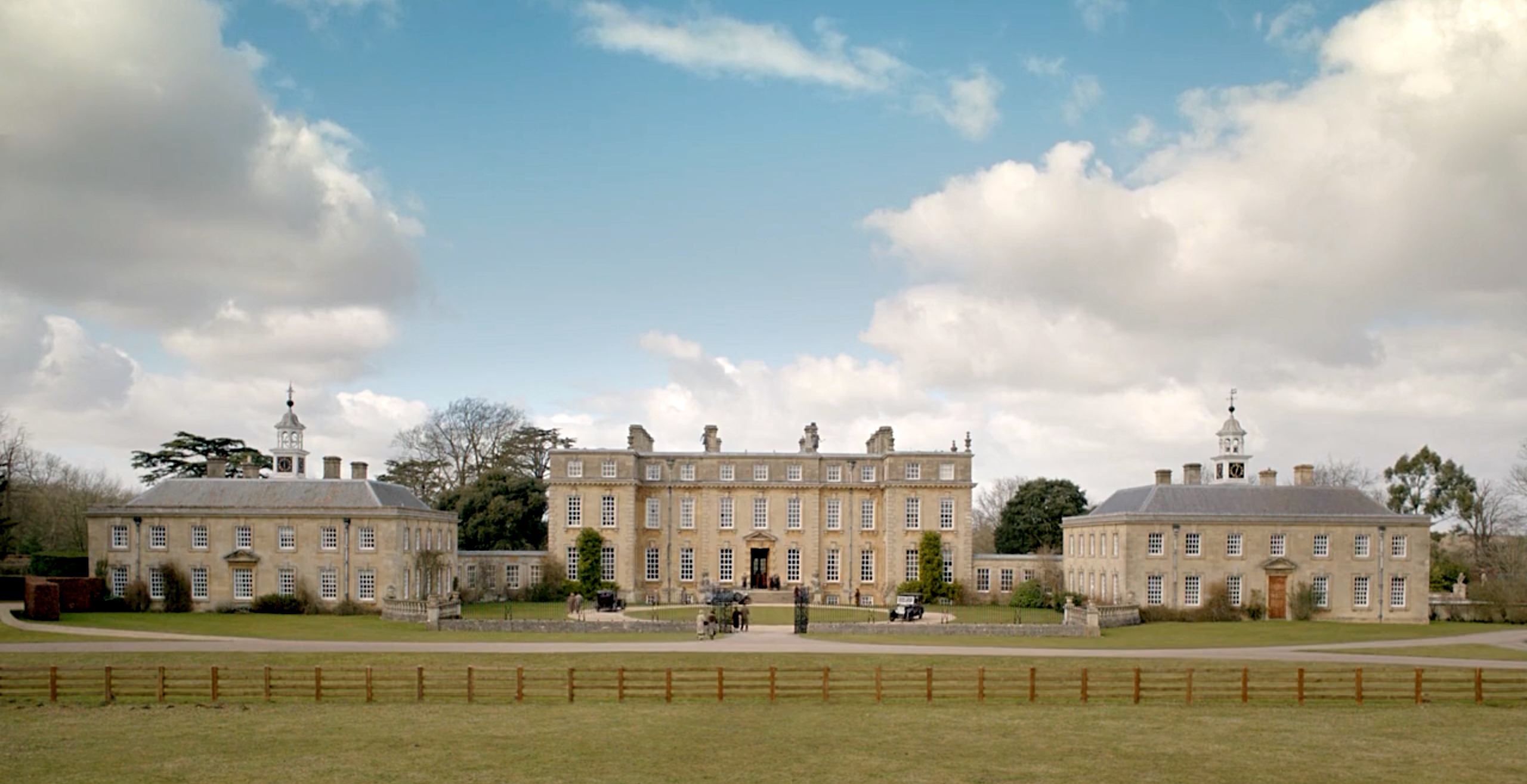
Ditchley House

The Ditchley Foundation is a foundation that holds conferences, with a primary focus on British-American relations. Based at Ditchley Park near Chipping Norton, Oxfordshire, it was established as a privately funded charity in 1958 by philanthropist Sir David Wills. Its current Director is James Arroyo.

== Notable members ==
- Jonathan Hill, Baron Hill of Oareford. Current chairman of Ditchley (2017- ). He also has roles as senior advisor, Freshfields Bruckhaus Deringer (2017-); independent national director, The Times Newspapers; and board member, Centre for Policy Studies. He was formerly European Commissioner for Financial Stability, Financial Services and the Capital Markets Union (2014–16); Leader of the House of Lords and Chancellor of the Duchy of Lancaster (2013–14); Undersecretary of State for Schools (2010-2013).
- George Robertson, Baron Robertson of Port Ellen. He was also deputy-chairman of TNK-BP. He was NATO Secretary General from 1999 to 2003 and UK Secretary of State for Defence from 1997 to 1999, chairman of the Ditchley Foundation, 2010–2017.
- Sir John Major, the former British prime minister, chairman of the Ditchley Foundation 2000–2009.
- Sir John Wheeler-Bennett. British historian; the first chairman, appointed in 1958.
- Sir Reginald Hibbert. Director 1982–1987.
- Sir Philip Adams. Director 1977–1982.
- Sir Michael Quinlan. Director 1992–1999.
- Sir Nigel Broomfield. Director 1999–2004.
- Sir Jeremy Greenstock. Director 2004–2010.
- Sir John Holmes. Director 2010–2016.
- James Arroyo. Director 2016–.

== Council of Management ==
- Charles Low, 2nd Baron Aldington. Chairman, Machfast Group Ltd
- George Bridges, Baron Bridges of Headley. Senior Adviser to the Group Executive Chairman, Banco Santander
- Janice Charette. Canadian High Commissioner to the United Kingdom of Great Britain and Northern Ireland
- Marjorie Neasham Glasgow. CEO, Ridge Clean Energy. President, The Glasgow Foundation.
- Charles Grant Director, Centre for European Reform
- Dominic Grieve. Formerly Member of Parliament for Beaconsfield (1997-2019); Attorney General
- Jonathan Hill, Baron Hill of Oareford. Chairman of the Ditchley Foundation
- Rachel Lomax. Deputy Chair, British Council
- Peter Mandelson. Chairman, Global Counsel. Formerly Secretary of State for Business, Innovation and Skills and European Commissioner for Trade
- Paul Newman. Former Chairman, ICAP Energy; Director, JC Rathbone Associates Ltd.
- Elizabeth Padmore. Emeritus Trustee, Women for Women International - UK
- Emma Reynolds. Formerly Member of Parliament for Wolverhampton North East (2010-2019)
- Robert Gascoyne-Cecil, 7th Marquess of Salisbury. Chancellor of the University of Hertfordshire
- Sir Nigel Sheinwald. Visiting Professor, King's College, London; Director, Shell plc
- Philip Stephens. Director of the Editorial Board and Chief Political Commentator, Financial Times
- Dr Catherine Wills. Trustee
