= Gary Jones (nurse) =

British nurse and author (born 1953)

Gary J. Jones, CBE, FRCN (born 1953) is a British nurse and author. He is a Fellow of the Royal College of Nursing, the Florence Nightingale Foundation and the Faculty of Emergency Nursing. He is the editor and/or author of a number of journals and published articles about nursing.

In 1969, Jones began his nursing career as a hospital cadet at Orsett Hospital, Essex. He qualified as a nurse in 1974. He then trained as an ophthalmic nurse at Moorfields Eye Hospital, London, before returning to Orsett Hospital. He was chair of the Royal College of Nursing's (RCN) Accident & Emergency Forum UK from 1987 to 1990, and then chair of its successor, the RCN's Accident & Emergency Nursing Association UK from 1990 to 1995. From 1994 to 1997, he was honorary consultant nurse advisor to the Chief Nursing Officer at the Department of Health (DoH). He was made a Fellow of the Royal College of Nursing in 2002.

He has advised on many aspects of emergency care, including paramedic training, expert nursing practice and emergency community care, on a national level. He owns and operates his own medical care company, Health Care Training & Development Services Ltd.

In the 2003 Queen's Birthday Honours, Jones was appointed Commander of the Order of the British Empire (CBE) for services to emergency nursing.

== Selected works ==
Some of his publications include:

- Learning to care in the A&E department (1986), Hodder & Stoughton, London
- Accident & emergency nursing: A structured approach (1990), Faber & Faber, London
- Emergency Nursing Care: Principles and Practice (2003; co-editor, along with Ruth Endacott and Robert Crouch), Greenwich Medical Media, London (ISBN 18411-0081-1/ISBN 978-18411-0081-4)
- Jones, Gary J. (2019). It's not all blood and guts: my amazing life as an A&E nurse. ISBN 978-1527248014.
- Jones, Gary J (2021). The history of emergency nursing 1972-2007 : my memoirs continue. ISBN 9798719854106.
