= John Temple (surgeon) =

British surgeon

Sir John Graham Temple FRCSE is a British surgeon, a former President of the Royal College of Surgeons of Edinburgh.

== Early life and education ==
Temple was born in Salford, Lancashire, England. He was educated at William Hulme's Grammar School in Manchester He studied at University of Liverpool School of Medicine, graduating in 1965.

== Medical career ==
In 1968 he became a surgical registrar and he completed his postgraduate surgical training in Manchester and Liverpool.

In 1991 he became the Regional Postgraduate Dean in the West Midlands.

He was President of the Royal College of Surgeons of Edinburgh from 2000 to 2003. He was commissioned by the Scottish Executive to look at the medical workforce in Scotland and his report Future Practice was published in July 2002 and made 37 recommendations. He authored a report published in 2004, titled Securing Future Practice in which he proposed moving towards a "trained doctor-based service" with less reliance upon work from doctors who undertaking training.

He was appointed as the independent chair of the UK-wide review of the impact of the European Working Time Directive on junior doctors, known as the Time for Training review, which reported in 2010.

== Honours and awards ==
He was elected as an ordinary fellow of the Academy of Medical Sciences in 1998.

In 2002 he was elected a member of the Harveian Society of Edinburgh and in 2005 served as President of the Society.

He was awarded a Knight Bachelor for services to medicine and medical education in the 2003 Queen's Birthday honours in 2003.
