= Norman Hudson =

Norman Hudson OBE (1945 - ) Chairman of the Historic Houses Foundation, founder and publisher of Hudson's Historic Houses and Gardens annual guidebook, is known primarily as having been an advisor to owners of historic houses on management, development of tourism, ancillary uses and location filming.

== Career ==
Norman Hudson OBE, a management and development consultant, advising primarily on Historic Houses and their management, is currently Chairman of the Historic Houses Foundation, a grant giving charitable body. He has had wide involvement in the Built Heritage sector including having been a member of the National Trust Council 1973–1988, a member of the British Tourism Development Committee, from 1977-2005 retained as Adviser to Historic Houses [Historic Houses Association] whose 1,600 members are the private owners of the most important historic houses and gardens in Great Britain. Hudson continues as consultant to Historic Houses and serves on its Council Council. Having been chairman he is now Patron of the Sulgrave Manor Trust, that looks after Sulgrave Manor [www.sulgravemanor.co.uk] the UK ancestral home of George Washington.

From 1987 until 2007, Hudson published, via his publishing company Norman Hudson & Co, 20 annual editions of Hudson's Historic Houses and Gardens guidebook, then the principal annual guide to UK heritage property open to the public.

In September 2007 Hudson sold the Hudson's Historic Houses and Gardens title to the Heritage House Group Ltd. His involvement continued as chair of the judging panel for the Hudsons Awards, now known as the UK Heritage awards. In 2017 he himself received a Lifetime Achievement award from the Heritage Alliance.

In the 2003 Queen's Birthday Honours list, Hudson received an OBE for services to the heritage tourism industry. He is married to Jane, founder of M&G Presents, and lives in Upper Wardington, Oxfordshire. Hudson, prior to its sale in 2016, was Chairman of M&G Presents Ltd, then one of the principal UK mail order gift catalogue businesses.

== Books – Author/Editor ==
- Historic Houses and Gardens of the Thames and Chilterns (1979) 32 pages, ISBN 0-85306-827-5, ISBN 978-0-85306-827-3. Revised edition (1982) 32 pages, ISBN 0-7117-0043-5, ISBN 978-0-7117-0043-7.
- Hudson's Historic Houses and Gardens (1987-2007) Norman Hudson & Co, annually, totalling 20 editions, starting with title dates 1987–8, then 1989 and so on annually. There are also identical USA editions, but with a different cover highlighting Great Britain and Ireland, and a separate ISBN through Globe Pequot Press. See the section below for further details.
- Film and Photography for Historic Houses and Gardens (1988) A Handbook for the Historic Houses Association, the National Trust and English Heritage, 82 pages, ISBN 0-9514062-1-3, ISBN 978-0-9514062-1-2.
- Film and Photography for Historic Houses and Gardens (1995) A Historic Houses Association Handbook, 98 pages, ISBN 0-9525482-0-8, ISBN 978-0-9525482-0-1.
- Hudson's Guide to Historic Properties in Scotland (1997) Norman Hudson & Co, 290 pages, ISBN 0-9514157-9-4, ISBN 978-0-9514157-9-5. Revised editions - (1998) 64 pages, ISBN 0-9531426-0-4, ISBN 978-0-9531426-0-6; (1999) 88 pages, ISBN 0-9531426-3-9, ISBN 978-0-9531426-3-7.
- Hudson’s Historic Family Homes and Gardens: From the Air (2002) Norman Hudson & Co, foreword by HHA President - the Earl of Leicester, 192 pages, hardcover, ISBN 0-9531426-8-X, ISBN 978-0-9531426-8-2. Paperback (2002) ISBN 0-9531426-9-8, ISBN 978-0-9531426-9-9.

== Books – Published by Norman Hudson & Company ==
- Highclere Castle (1988) by Sarah Greenwood, 31 pages, (Highclere Castle).
- Thirlestane Castle & the Border Country Life Museum, Lauder, Berwickshire: an illustrated guide (1989) 32 pages (Thirlestane Castle).
- A Walk for Diana: The Diana, Princess of Wales Memorial Walk (2001) by Tom Corby and Lucy Trench, paperback, 84 pages, ISBN 0-9531426-6-3, ISBN 978-0-9531426-6-8 (Memorial Walk).

== Books – Editions of Hudson's Historic Houses and Gardens ==
The year listed below is that shown on the book cover, not the date published, which is usually at the end of the year before the cover year. The property name is of that featured on the front cover. For each year, the UK edition is listed first, then the separate US edition (which ceased after the 2007 edition).

- 2008 - Dunrobin Castle, ISBN 1-904387-07-1, ISBN 978-1-904387-07-7.
- 2009 - Dumfries House, ISBN 0-85101-886-6, ISBN 978-0-85101-886-7.
