= Yve Buckland =

British public health administrator

Dame Yvonne Buckland DBE, FRSA, FInstD
- Born: Yvonne Helen Elaine Jones; 29 November 1956 (age 69); West Midlands, England
- Other name: Yve Buckland
- Education: University of Leeds; University of Liverpool; University of Lancashire
- Occupation: Public health administrator
- Awards: Heinz Award

Dame Yvonne Helen Elaine Buckland, DBE, FRSA, FInstD (née Jones; born 29 November 1956), commonly known as Yve Buckland, is a British public health administrator.

== Early life ==
Buckland was born Yvonne Helen Elaine Jones in the West Midlands on 29 November 1956, the daughter of George Robert Jones and his wife, Margaret Ann (née O'Hanlon).

Following schooling at Our Lady of Mercy Grammar School in Wolverhampton, she attended the University of Leeds, graduating in 1977 with a Bachelor of Arts degree (BA). She then completed a Diploma in Archive Studies (DipArch) at the University of Liverpool in 1978. She was awarded a Diploma in Management Studies (DMS) by the University of Central Lancashire in 1984.

== Career ==
After leaving Liverpool, Jones became an archivist for Cheshire County Council and in 1983 was promoted to Deputy County Archivist. She later recalled "I trained as an archivist, and when I started out local government was one of the only places you could get work ... I absolutely loved what I found – the records of the medical offer of health, and of the establishment of the council. So I ended up wanting to work for the business rather than looking after its history".

In 1985, she became Team Leader of the Management Effectiveness Unit at Birmingham City Council, serving until 1988, when she became Assistant Director of Social Services. She moved over to Nottingham City Council in 1992 to be Deputy Chief Executive and then, from 1999 to 2000, served as Chair of the Health Education Authority for England. Buckland chaired the Health Development Agency between 2000 and 2005, and then the NHS Institute for Innovation and Improvement until 2011.

Amidst sharply rising utility bills, recent droughts and water companies failing to meet leakage targets, the Consumer Council for Water was formed in 2005 and Buckland was appointed the founding Chair, serving until 2015.

Buckland's other roles include directorships at the South Warwickshire Primary Care Trust (2003–05) and the Health Partnership at Warwick Business School (2003–05). In 2017, she took over from Paul Golby as Pro Chancellor and Chair of the Council at Aston University.

She is currently the chair of Birmingham and Solihull Integrated Care Board, leading the health arm of the ICS, which is a collaboration of all health and social care organisations, including NHS, local authority and the voluntary and community sector.

=== Honours ===
In 2001, Buckland was appointed a Fellow at the Warwick Institute of Government and Public Management. The following year, she was elected a Fellow of the Royal Society of Arts (FRSA) and in 2015 she became a Fellow of the Institute of Directors.

In 2003, Buckland was appointed a Dame Commander of the Order of the British Empire for "service to public health".

== Personal life ==
In 1982, she married Patrick Buckland, whose surname she maintains professionally. In 1999, Buckland married, secondly, to Stephen Freer. She has two daughters. In an interview with The Guardian, Buckland stated that she enjoys bell-ringing and reading in her free time.
