= Peter Marshall (diplomat) =

British diplomat (1924 – 2023)

Sir Peter Harold Reginald Marshall KCMG, CVO (30 July 1924 – 10 June 2023) was a British diplomat.

== Early life and education ==
Born in Reading to Winifred and Reginald Marshall, an auditor, Marshall was educated at Tonbridge School and served as a navigator in the Royal Air Force during World War II. After the war, he attended Corpus Christi College, Cambridge, as a choral scholar, earning a degree in economics in 1949.

== Career ==
Marshall joined the Diplomatic Service, holding positions in Washington, Baghdad, Bangkok, Geneva, and Paris over his first two decades.

In 1979, Marshall was posted to Geneva, where he focused on multilateral diplomacy. Following his retirement from the Diplomatic Service, he served as Deputy Secretary-General of the Commonwealth and later became chairman of the Royal Commonwealth Society. He was involved in several organisations, including the Council for Education in World Citizenship, the English-Speaking Union, and St Catherine's Foundation.

Marshall authored Positive Diplomacy, a guide based on his Foreign Office experiences and served as a visiting lecturer at the Diplomatic Academy of London. He was known for his expertise in economics and his methodical approach to negotiations.

== Personal life ==
Marshall was married twice, first to Patricia Stoddart until her death in 1981, and then to Judith Tomlin until her death in 2013. He was survived by his children, Fiona and Guy Marshall.
