= Norman Cummings Nevin =

British geneticist

Norman Cummings Nevin OBE (Belfast, 10 June 1935 – Belfast on 9 July 2014) was a British geneticist.

== Biography ==
Norman Cummings Nevin was born in Belfast on 10 June 1935. In 1961 he married Jean, a cytogeneticist in the Belfast City Hospital, by whom he had two children. He received his medical doctorate at the Queen's University Belfast in 1964. In 1965 he was appointed to a Medical Research Council Clinical Fellowship at the Clinical Genetics Research Unit at the UCL Great Ormond Street Institute of Child Health in London and Great Ormond Street Hospital. Here he was to develop a lifelong interest and expertise in the field of genetics. He was appointed as a lecturer in human genetics at Queen’s University Belfast in 1967. In 1969 he joined the Medical Staff of the Royal Belfast Hospital for Sick Children. In March 1972 he established a weekly Human Genetics Clinic at the Children's Hospital. He became Professor of Medical Genetics at the Queen's University Belfast in 1975. Nevin was particularly interested in spina bifida and Down syndrome and helped develop the concept of periconceptual folic acid supplementation for the prevention of spina bifida with researchers in Leeds in the 1970s. He died in Belfast on 9 July 2014.

Nevin served on several government bodies, including the Human Genetics Commission and the Gene Therapy Advisory Committee, which he chaired from 1996 to 2003. On 15 June 2003 he was awarded the OBE for services to gene therapy research. He was treasurer, member of council, secretary and later president (from 1991 to 1992) of the Clinical Genetics Society (CGS).

== Bibliography ==
- Love, Harold (1998). The Royal Belfast Hospital for Sick Children: A History 1948-1998. Blackstaff Press. pp. 32–33.
- Morrison, Patrick (2014). "Norman Cummings Nevin". Royal College of Physicians.
