= Robin Miller (businessman) =

British businessman

Sir Robert William Miller is a former chief of Emap, (East Midlands Allied Press), and more recently, a former chairman of HMV, taking over from Eric Nicoli. He has held and still holds many executive and non-executive positions. He received a knighthood in the June 2003 Queen’s birthday Honours list.

== Career highlights ==
In 1965, Miller started in Emap as a junior reporter.

In 1998, he was appointed as non-executive chairman of Emap, and in 2001 he returned as Chief Executive of Emap. In 2004, he left Emap and was appointed non-executive director and chairman of HMV, effective 2 February 2004. In July 2005, HMV announced that Miller was stepping down to "pursue other commitments." In 2005, he was appointed non-executive chairman of Edge Performance VCT.

== Other positions ==
- Non-executive director of Channel 4 Television until 2005.
- Chairman of Sport England (Eastern Division).
- Non-executive director (1998–2001) of Moss Bros plc
- Non-executive director of the Tote.
- Chairman of music publisher Boosey & Hawkes.
- Member of the WPBSA Board.
- Non-Executive Chairman of digitalbox ltd.
