= Chris Banks (businessman) =

British businessman (born 1959)

- Born: 1959 (age 66–67)
- Education: Birmingham University
- Alma mater: Aston University
- Occupation: Businessman

Christopher Nigel Banks CBE (born 1959) is a British businessman.

He graduated from Birmingham University with a BA degree in Latin and French 1980. He graduated from Aston University with an MBA degree in 1981.

In his business career, Banks had marketing and general management roles with Grand Metropolitan (now Diageo), Allied Domecq, HP Bulmer and Mars. He was Managing Director of Coca-Cola Great Britain from 1997 to 2001. In 2004, he was named Ernst & Young Entrepreneur of the Year (Consumer Products, London).

In public life, he was Chairman of the Learning and Skills Council, Deputy Chair of the National Employment Panel, and a Commissioner for Women and Work. He is a founder of the Independent College Partnership. In 2011, he completed an independent review into fees and co-funding in Further Education. He is the Chair of the Public Chairs’ Forum (PCF). He is Chair of Directgov. He is the Deputy Pro-Chancellor of Birmingham University.

Banks was appointed a Commander of the Order of the British Empire (CBE) in 2003 for services to young people and the unemployed.

He was awarded the honorary degree of Doctor of the University (DUniv) by the University of Birmingham in 2012.
