= John Mogg, Baron Mogg =

The Right Honourable The Lord Mogg KCMG

Member of the House of Lords
- Lord Temporal
- Life peerage 28 May 2008 – 14 January 2019

Personal details
- Born: John Frederick Mogg; 5 October 1943 (age 82) Birmingham
- Occupation: Chairman, Ofgem

John Frederick Mogg, Baron Mogg KCMG (5 October 1943) was Chairman of Ofgem between 2003 and 2013 and is the current Chairman of the EU Energy Regulators. It was announced that he would become a life peer on 18 April 2008, and on 28 May 2008 he was created Baron Mogg, of Queen's Park in the county of East Sussex. On 14 January 2019 he retired from the House of Lords.

== Professional life ==
Mogg spent half of his career in the Civil Service, particularly with regards to industry and European issues. He also served with the European Commission, reaching the grade of Director-General with responsibility for the Internal Market and Financial Services.

He was appointed a Knight Commander of the Order of St Michael and St George (KCMG) in 2003.

In his previous role as chairman of energy regulator Ofgem, he received £214,999 a year salary, as revealed to the public in July 2010.

== Titles ==
- Mr John Mogg (1943–2003)
- Sir John Mogg KCMG (2003–2008)
- The Rt. Hon. The Lord Mogg KCMG (2008–)
