= 8th Battalion (Parachute), Royal Ranger Regiment =

- Batalion Ke-8, Rejimen Renjer Diraja (Para)
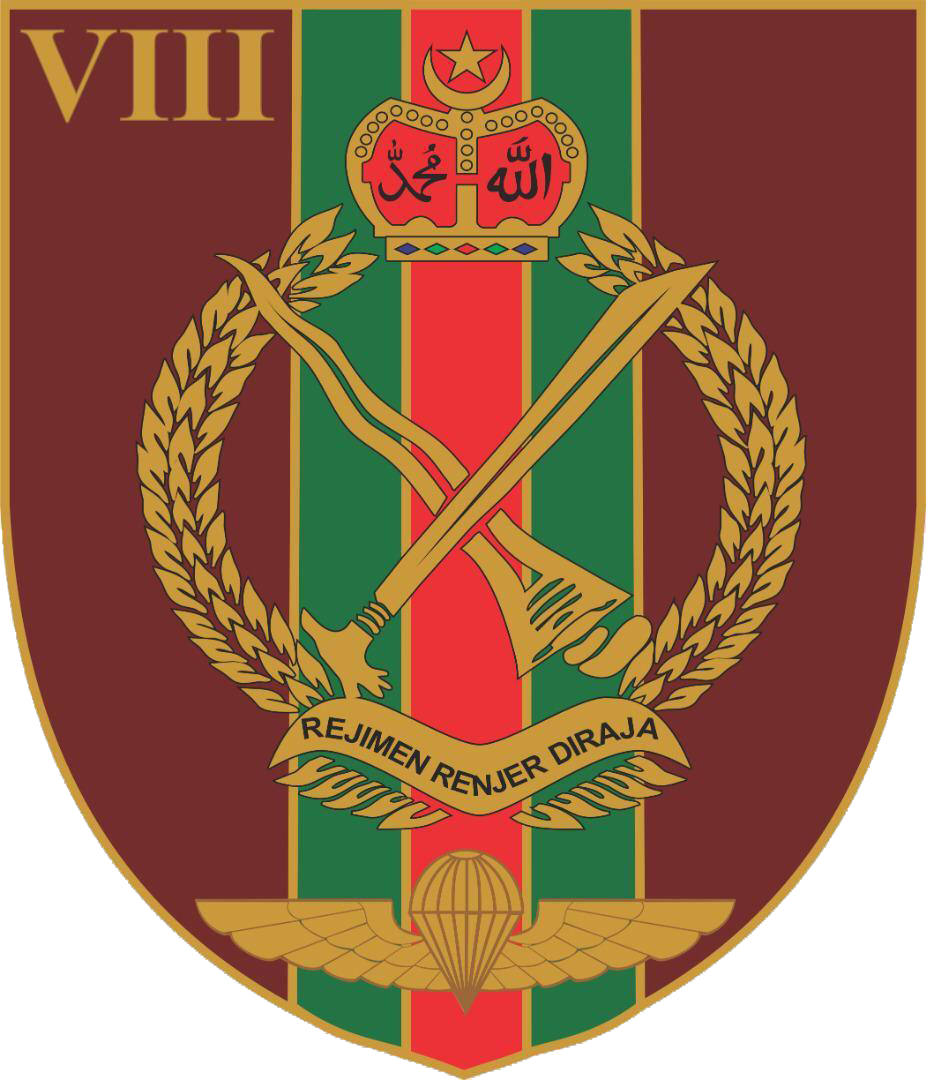
- Crest of the 8 RRD (Para)
- Founded: 1 March 1973 (52 years ago)
- Country: Malaysia
- Allegiance: Yang di-Pertuan Agong ('King of Malaysia')
- Branch: Malaysian Army
- Type: Specialised light infantry
- Role: Airborne operations; Amphibious warfare; Air assault
- Size: 7 companies
- Part of: 10th Parachute Brigade
- Garrison/HQ: Camp Terendak, Malacca
- Nicknames: "Airborne Ranger", "8 RRD", "8 Ranger", "8 Para"
- Patron: Tuanku Syed Sirajuddin Ibni Almarhum Tuanku Syed Putra Jamalullail
- Mottos: Anang Skali Ngalah (Iban: Never Give Up)
- Colors: Green and red
- Mascot: Rhinoceros hornbill
- Anniversaries: 1 March
- Engagements: List: Operation Parang (1976); Operation Tanduk (1977); Operation Setia (1978-1980); Operation Gawai; Operation Pelanduk (1999); Operation Kota Echo/Foxtrot (2001); Operation Pasir (2002–present); Operation Daulat (2013)
- Battle honours: Daulat Feb 2013

Commanders
- Current commander: Lieutenant Colonel Yusrin Azuan Abd Aziz
- Regimental sergeant major: Warrant Officer I Shahrin Jamal Nasir
- Notable commanders: Lieutenant General Dato' Awie Suboh

Insignia
- Battalion's flag (2019-present)

The 8th Battalion (Parachute), Royal Ranger Regiment (8th Ranger) (Malay: Batalion Ke-8, Rejimen Renjer Diraja (Para)), commonly referred to as 8 RRD (Para), is a battalion-sized elite specialised light infantry unit of the Royal Ranger Regiment within the Malaysian Army. Specialising as a hybrid airborne-marine infantry unit since 2002, the 8th Ranger represents the pinnacle of tactical versatility and operational readiness within the Malaysian Army.

Since November 1984, the 8th Ranger has been assigned to Task Force 083, which was later re-designated as the 10th Parachute Brigade (10 PARA BDE). This affiliation makes the 8th Ranger the most senior unit within the elite brigade and the first conventional infantry unit in the Malaysian Army to transition into an airborne role.

Membership in the 8th Ranger requires soldiers to complete the Basic Rapid Deployment Force Course, the Malaysian Army's equivalent of the U.S. Army's Ranger Assessment and Selection Program.

The current commander of the 8th Ranger, Lieutenant Colonel Yusrin Azuan Abd Aziz, assumed command on 24 February 2023, succeeding Lieutenant Colonel Zahari Affandi Mat Nor.

== History ==
=== Set up as infantry training centre ===
The unit was established on 1 March 1973, following a request from the Government of Sarawak to form a military element within the Malaysian Army composed exclusively of Sarawakians. Initially named the 8th Ranger, its primary function was to serve as a training centre for the Malaysian Ranger Regiment. Until 1973, the Wellington Lines at Camp Terendak in Malacca housed the headquarters of the 1st Battalion, Royal New Zealand Infantry Regiment (1 RNZIR). Early that year, the Commonwealth handed over the camp to the Malaysian government, making the 8th Ranger the first local military unit to be stationed there.

On 12 March 1973, 500 recruits from Sarawak commenced six months of basic training at the newly established centre. However, by 4 September 1973, the Malaysian Army restructured the unit, dissolving its role as a training centre and reinstating it as a full infantry battalion.

=== Transition to infantry role ===
The Malaysian Army restructured the unit as the 8th Battalion of the Malaysian Ranger Regiment (Malay: Batalion ke-8, Rejimen Renjer Malaysia). Following the graduation of 500 Sarawakian recruits from the training centre, only a portion remained with the battalion. Many were assigned to other units, and officers and soldiers from various units volunteered to join the newly formed battalion. As a result, the original plan to create a unit entirely composed of Sarawakians was not realized. In November 1973, the battalion relocated from Wellington Lines to a new base in Sarawak.

=== Transition to airborne role ===
In the early 1970s, the Malaysian Army explored the idea of forming an infantry brigade with parachuting capabilities. However, the plan initially faced resistance from the government, which was concerned that such a development might cause unease in neighbouring Singapore.

In November 1984, the 8th Ranger was attached to the 11th Strategic Division (XI DIV) and placed under Task Force 083, the predecessor of the 10th Parachute Brigade. The division's strategic defence role required experimentation in planning, doctrine, training, and other areas to ensure the Malaysian Army maintained a combat advantage. As part of these experiments, the 8th Ranger served as the primary unit for testing the feasibility of a non-conventional infantry capability. After several years of trials, XI DIV concluded that airborne units would provide a significant tactical advantage to the Malaysian Army.

On 1 January 1987, the transformation plan was approved, and the 8th Ranger was officially restructured into an experimental airborne infantry unit, adopting the new designation of 8th Battalion (Parachute). The transition was executed smoothly, and by July 1990, the 8th Ranger had become a fully operational airborne infantry battalion. Later that year, two additional battalions—the 9th and 17th Battalion of the Royal Malay Regiment—were authorised to undergo similar transformations, marking the expansion of the Malaysian Army's airborne capabilities.

==== Airborne infantry pioneers ====
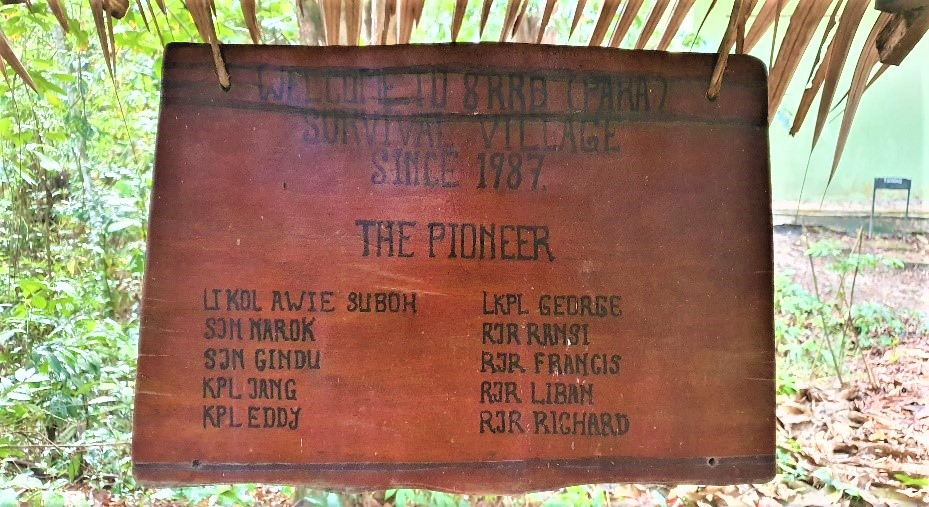
'The pioneer' memorial placard.

The first group to complete the Airborne Course at the Special Warfare Training Centre in 1987 included one officer and nine other ranks personnel from conventional infantry units. These pioneers, commemorated on a memorial placard known as "The Pioneer," marked the beginning of airborne capability in the Malaysian Army. (Note: Malaysia already had airborne units before this, but they were more focused on special forces than airborne infantry.) Their names are:

1. Lieutenant Colonel Awie Suboh (retired as Lieutenant General Dato')
2. Sergeant Marok
3. Sergeant Gindu
4. Corporal Jang
5. Corporal Eddy
6. Lance corporal George
7. Ranger Ransi
8. Ranger Francis
9. Ranger Liban
10. Ranger Richard

=== Reorganisation into the Rapid Deployment Force ===
The Malaysian Armed Forces (MAF) aimed to unify all military units with airborne capabilities under a single command structure. By the end of 1992, the 8th Ranger, which were part of the 10th Strategic Brigade under the 11th Strategic Division (11 Div Stra) of the Malaysian Army, became the first unit to join an independent formation known as the Rapid Deployment Force. (Note: The 10th Parachute Brigade is an independent formation reporting directly to the Chief of Army, not under any field command.) On 10 October 1994, the Rapid Deployment Force and the 10th Parachute Brigade were officially introduced as components of the MAF by then Prime Minister Mahathir Mohamad during the Langkawi International Maritime and Aerospace Exhibition (LIMA).

=== Transition to a hybrid airborne-marine unit ===
A rise in kidnapping incidents by pirates and Abu Sayyaf terrorists along the eastern coast of Sabah prompted the Malaysian government to implement preventive measures. The MAF was tasked with enhancing security in the region, supplementing existing military and law enforcement efforts. As part of this initiative, Operation Pandanan/Sipadan (later abbreviated to Ops PASIR) was launched on 20 September 2000, focusing on securing the entire eastern Sabah coastline, from Kudat to Semporna. The operation also covered Malaysia's Exclusive Economic Zone (EEZ) and airspace, encompassing the South China Sea, Sulu Sea, and Sulawesi Sea. This region became known as the Eastern Sabah Security Zone (ESSZONE), with military operations overseen by the Joint Forces Command.

The 8th Ranger were deployed to cover the Kudat to Sandakan area, with a company designated as the Quick Reaction Force (QRF) for the entire ESSZONE. Although not originally a marine unit, the 8th Ranger quickly adapted to their new role and environment. In June 2002, the battalion underwent a week-long intensive amphibious warfare training program with the United States Marine Corps (USMC) in Pahang. Combining this training with their operational experience in ESSZONE, the 8th Ranger transformed into a hybrid airborne-marine unit. Other units deployed to ESSZONE, such as the 7th and 22nd Battalions of the Royal Malay Regiment, also participated in similar USMC training at later dates and locations.

=== Female paratroopers ===
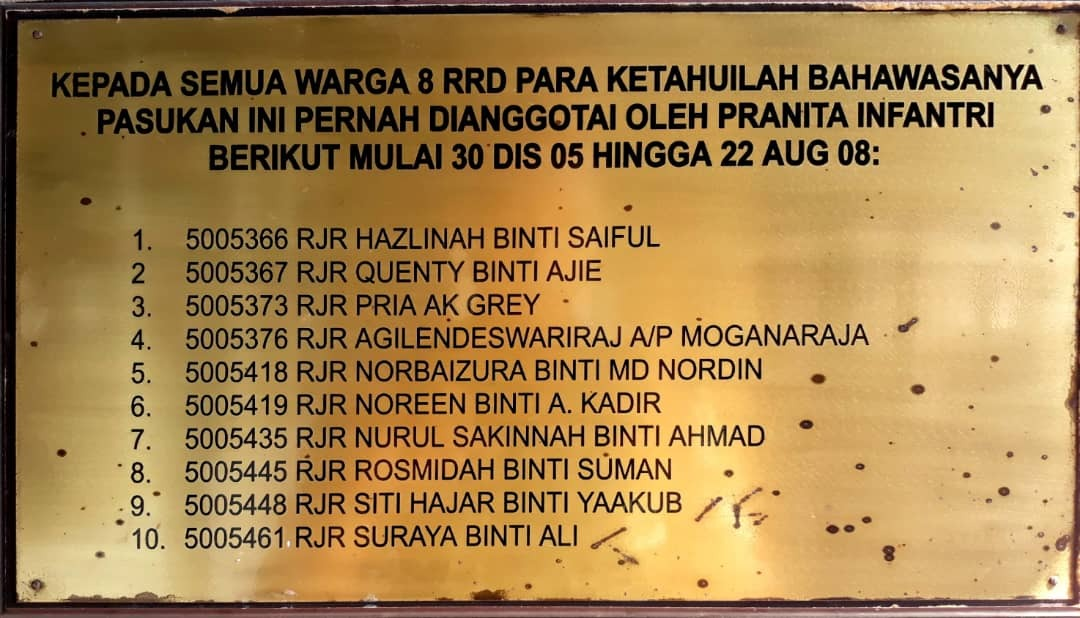
Pioneer team of female paratrooper memorial placard.

To evaluate the effectiveness of female soldiers in airborne combat roles, the Malaysian Army allowed a group of female soldiers to enrol in the Airborne School and the Basic Rapid Deployment Force Course (Kursus Asas Pasukan Aturgerak Cepat—APAC) under the 10th Parachute Brigade. Ten women successfully completed the course and were experimentally attached to the 8th Ranger (Para) from 30 December 2005 to 2 August 2008. These pioneer female paratroopers are commemorated on a memorial placard recognising their groundbreaking contributions to the Malaysian Army. The pioneer female paratroopers were:

1. Ranger Hazlinah Saiful
2. Ranger Quenty Ajie
3. Ranger Pria Grey
4. Ranger Agilendeswiraraj Moganaraja
5. Ranger Norbaizura Md Nordin
6. Ranger Noreen A. Kadir
7. Ranger Nurul Sakinnah Ahmad
8. Ranger Rosmidah Suman
9. Ranger Siti Hajar Yaakub — Killed during parachuting exercise on 2 December 2007
10. Ranger Suraya Ali

=== Upgraded to Specialised Light Infantry ===
Initially, the infantry battalions under 10 PARA BDE, including the 8th Ranger, were designated as conventional infantry units tasked with standard infantry duties. (Note: At the time, the battalions were similar to other conventional infantry units in Malaysia but had additional insertion methods. On 9 October 2020, the brigade transitioned into a special unit.) These units were classified as Batalion Infantri Standard (Standard Infantry Battalion) by the Malaysian Army Commands. However, on 9 October 2020, the Chief of Army, General Zamrose Mohd Zain, announced an upgrade in the status of 10 PARA BDE to that of specialised light infantry. This significant reclassification relieved the brigade of conventional infantry responsibilities typically assigned to standard battalions.

The 10 PARA BDE now holds a status comparable to the U.S. Army's 75th Ranger Regiment and the British Army's Specialised Infantry Group (currently the Army Special Operations Brigade). The brigade is primarily focused on conducting airborne, air assault, and amphibious operations, with additional capabilities to undertake special operations or to function as special operations-capable infantry. This shift underscores the brigade's enhanced role in the Malaysian Army's rapid deployment and specialised warfare capabilities.

== Structures ==
The 8th Ranger (Para) has been based at Camp Terendak, Malacca, since November 1984. There are 7 companies and 1 welfare organisation under 8th Ranger.

=== Current structures ===
Current structures of the 8th Ranger (Para)
Name	Type
Battalion HQ	Battalion's management and administration
Alpha Company	Specialised light infantry
Bravo Company	Specialised light infantry
Charlie Company	Specialised light infantry
Delta Company	Specialised light infantry
Support Company	Mortar, heavy machine-gun, anti-tank and communications support
HQ Company	Service support

=== Family welfare support ===
The 8th Ranger (Para)'s BAKAT oversees the family welfare support for the brigade. The organisation is under the leadership of the spouse of the Commander of 8th Ranger (Para), with the commander serving as the patron for this organisation.

=== Disbanded units ===
==== Ngelaban Platoon, 8th Ranger ====
The Platun Ngelaban (Lightning Platoon, Malay: Platun Kilat) served as the strike team for the 8th Ranger. Each battalion within the Ranger Regiment maintained its own version of this elite platoon. The Platun Ngelaban was disbanded on 8 August 1978, and succeeded by the UCIS Platoon of the 8th Ranger. The unit gained fame when one of its members was awarded the Star of the Commander of Valour (Pingat Gagah Berani—PGB), Malaysia's second-highest honour for valour.

==== UCIS Platoon, 8th Ranger ====
The Unit Combat Intelligence Section (UCIS) Platoon of the 8th Ranger (Platun Risik Tempur 8 Ranger) was established on 8 August 1978, as the successor to the Platun Ngelaban. This platoon specialised in combat intelligence and reconnaissance missions. Its members gained renown during military operations along the Perak–Kelantan border between 1979 and 1980, with two members receiving the prestigious Star of the Commander of Valour (PGB) for their acts of bravery.

Eventually, all UCIS Platoons across the Malaysian Army were disbanded and replaced by dedicated Reconnaissance Platoons and Sniper Platoons, streamlining the roles and capabilities of combat support units.

== Customs and traditions ==
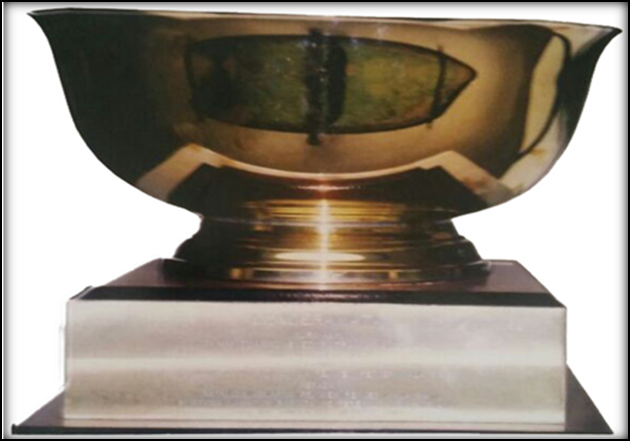
HRH Putra of Perlis' Bronze Cup.

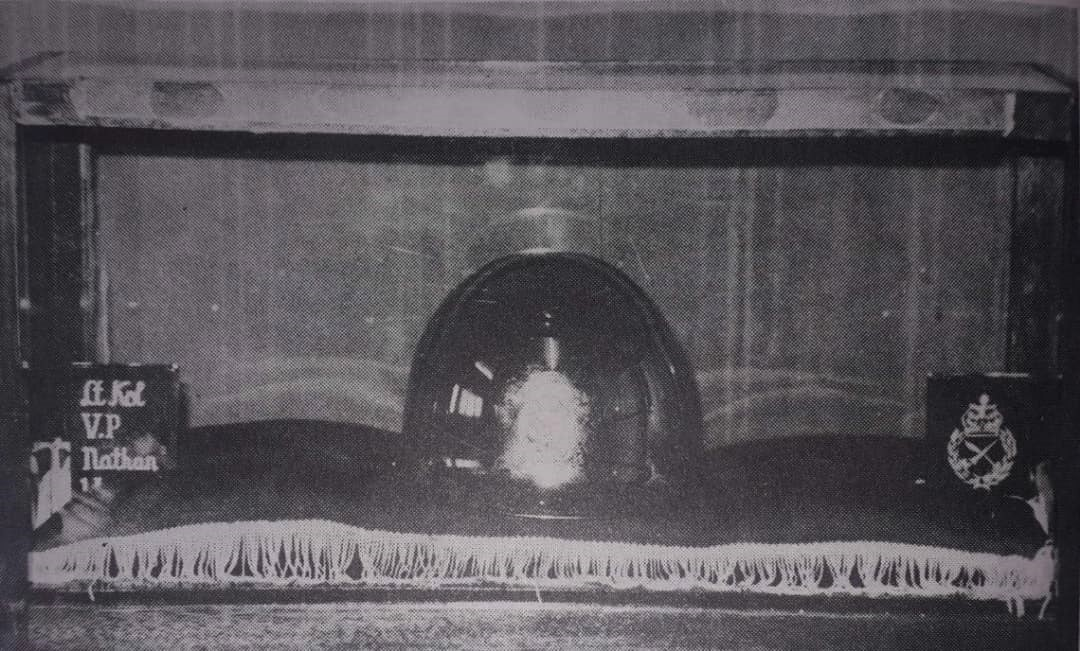
8th Ranger's silver-plated steel helmet.

=== Colours ===
- Green – Symbolise of battalion's readiness
- Red – Symbolise of always prepared

=== Uniforms ===
Rifle green beret with black hackle

The rifle green beret with a black hackle symbolises the light infantry heritage of the Royal Ranger Regiment. The regiment's initial role as light infantry and scouts was influenced by the Royal Irish Fusiliers, later known as the Royal Irish Rangers, of the British Army. Prior to 10 October 1994, all members of the 8th Ranger wore this beret. Today, it is worn exclusively by non-Rapid Deployment Force (RDF)-trained personnel of the battalion.

Maroon beret

The maroon beret represents the battalion's airborne capability. The establishment of Malaysia's airborne forces drew significant influence from the Parachute Regiment of the British Army. Since 10 October 1994, all RDF-trained members of the 8th Ranger (Para) have adopted the maroon beret, signifying their status as airborne troops.

=== Ceremonial objects ===
HRH Putra of Perlis' Bronze Cup

This bronze cup, standing 24.5 centimetres (9.6 in) tall and weighing 2.76 kilograms (6.1 lb), serves as one of the primary ceremonial objects of the 8th Ranger (Para). It was granted by Putra of Perlis on 5 October 1989 to symbolise the battalion's readiness to accept and fulfil any responsibilities assigned by higher command.

Battalion's steel helmet

The steel helmet holds historical significance, as it was issued by the Malaysian Army to units stationed under the Rajang Area Security Command (RASCOM) during the Communist Insurgency in Sarawak. The 8th Ranger, stationed in this region for several years, later silver-plated one of these helmets to serve as a ceremonial object.

Ceremonial weapon

The silver kris, the ceremonial weapon of the 8th Ranger (Para), was granted by Putra of Perlis on 29 June 1999 to commemorate the battalion's inclusion in Malaysia's elite military units. The kris symbolises the spirit of a warrior.

Commander's parachute wings

Introduced on 1 March 2020, this ceremonial object was granted by the 24th Commander of the 8th Ranger, Lieutenant Colonel Zulkifli Raub. It honours the battalion's role as the pioneering airborne unit within the 10th Parachute Brigade.

== Killed in the line of duty ==
Rank	Name	Year of Death	Circumstances
Lance corporal	Abd Wahid Daing Malinda	24 February 1976	Step on landmine during an operation in Lundu, Sarawak
Ranger	Hamdan Kuncit	24 February 1976	Step on landmine during an operation in Lundu, Sarawak
Ranger	Jus Kisu	8 April 1976	Fall from military vehicle during an operation in Lundu, Sarawak
Ranger	Mohd Seruji Harun	3 July 1977	Hit by booby trap while in combat during Operation Cahaya Bena Satu in Southern Thailand
Ranger	Vasant Singh	12 February 1978	Drown during an operation in Julong, Perak
Second lieutenant	Abdullah Saad	19 June 1978	Killed in action (KIA) during Operation Setia 12 in Keramat Pulai, Perak
Lance corporal	Mohammad Ali	19 June 1978	KIA during Operation Setia 12 in Keramat Pulai, Perak
Ranger	Saimon Jalal	15 September 1978	KIA during Operation Sawadee in Southern Thailand
Ranger	Ramli Othman	1 June 1979	KIA during Operation Setia 8 in Korbu Lasah, Perak
Ranger	Baharuddin Yahaya	1 June 1979	KIA during Operation Setia 8 in Korbu Lasah, Perak
Ranger	Talip Tibong	24 February 1980	KIA during Operation Setia 2/80 in Tanah Hitam, Perak
Lance corporal	Jihed Nyamoi	10 March 1980	Food poisoning during Operation Setia 3/80 in Gopeng, Perak
Lance corporal	Lemon Rona	5 April 1980	KIA during Operation Setia 3/80 in Gopeng, Perak
Ranger	Jackson Samuel	24 April 1983	KIA during Operation Jala Aman 1 in Naman Asan, Sibu, Sarawak
Ranger	Jalal Kadir	24 April 1983	KIA during Operation Jala Aman 1 in Naman Asan, Sibu, Sarawak
Ranger	Norizan Abdul Rahman	15 August 2001	Suffering from Pulmonary Haemorrhage during Operation KOTA Foxtrot Series 2/2001
Ranger	Siti Hajar Yaakub	2 December 2007	Drown during the parachute rehearsal for the LIMA
Corporal	Mohamad Safuan Hassan	25 June 2018	Crushed by tree during Operation KOTA Foxtrot Series 2/2018
Lance corporal	Fahrurozi Abd Manaf	25 June 2018	Crushed by tree during Operation KOTA Foxtrot Series 2/2018

== Notable battles ==
=== Penrissen Border Clash (1975) ===
On 2 October 1975, a section from the Platun Ngelaban of the 8th Ranger, led by Sergeant Gandat Merdan, was conducting a manhunt near Mount Penrissen, Sarawak, close to the Malaysia-Indonesia border. The section split into two teams, with one small patrol team consisting of Rangers Beliang, Frederick, and Baru. While scouting, the patrol encountered an enemy camp but was ambushed during reconnaissance. Despite being outnumbered, Ranger Beliang led his team in the skirmish, killing one enemy combatant.

Hearing the gunfire, Sergeant Gandat and the main team rushed to support, ultimately defeating the remaining enemies. Among the deceased was Lee Lip Pong, the most wanted Sarawak Communist leader. For his bravery, Ranger Beliang Bali was promoted to lance corporal and later awarded the Pingat Gagah Berani (PGB) for his heroism during the Battle of Gopeng in 1977.

=== Operation Tanduk: Gopeng Jungle Ambush (1977) ===
In December 1977, during Operation Tanduk in Gopeng, Perak, Captain Patrick Wong Sing Nang led a squad of 10 men on a jungle patrol. The team split into two smaller groups, with one under the command of Sergeant Gandat Merdan. During the mission, Captain Patrick Wong's team was ambushed, resulting in his chest injury and serious wounds to three others, leaving only Lance Corporal Beliang unscathed.

Amid the chaos, one soldier from Sergeant Gandat's team was injured by a booby trap. Captain Patrick Wong called for a medevac and, despite his injury, provided cover fire alongside Lance Corporal Beliang to protect the wounded until evacuation was complete. For prioritising his men over himself, Captain Patrick Wong received a Kepujian Perutusan Keberanian (KPK). Lance Corporal Beliang Bali was honoured with the Pingat Gagah Berani (PGB) for his extraordinary defence of his injured comrades under fire.

=== Raid on Korbu Reserve Forest (1979) ===
On 1 June 1979, the UCIS Platoon of the 8th Ranger, led by Second Lieutenant Govinda Raj Kanappan, and one company under Captain Othman launched a raid on an enemy camp in the Korbu Reserve Forest, Fort Legap, Perak. The UCIS Platoon divided into two groups, with the reconnaissance team led by Sergeant Kanang Langkau and Corporal Micheal Riman scouting and marking the enemy sentry positions.

The recce team initiated the raid when Sergeant Kanang fired an M79 grenade launcher, followed by Captain Othman's company providing cover fire. Despite being outnumbered, the team captured the camp. Five enemies were killed, while the 8th Ranger suffered two fatalities. Corporal Micheal Riman was injured during the operation. For their valour, Sergeant Kanang Langkau and Corporal Micheal Riman were both awarded the Pingat Gagah Berani (PGB).

=== Tanah Hitam Jungle Ambush (1980) ===
In February 1980, Sergeant Kanang Langkau led a platoon from Charlie Company, 8th Ranger, on a manhunt mission in Tanah Hitam, Chemor, Perak. The platoon encountered an enemy group, killing one combatant. A few days later, on 19 February, they were ambushed while investigating a booby trap. The attack injured Sergeant Kanang and two others, including a sergeant and a medic.

Despite being gravely wounded in the chest and stomach, Sergeant Kanang took command, rallying his platoon to counterattack and secure victory. For his extraordinary leadership and bravery, Sergeant Kanang was awarded Malaysia's highest decoration for valour, the Grand Knight of Valour (Malay: Darjah Kebesaran Seri Pahlawan Gagah Perkasa — SP).

== List of Commanders ==
No.	Portrait	Commander	Took office	Left office	Time in office	Ref.
1	Mokhtar Ismail	Lieutenant Colonel; Mokhtar Ismail	4 September 1973	1 July 1974	300 days	
2	Raja Abdul Rashid Raja Badiozaman	Lieutenant Colonel; Raja Abdul Rashid Raja Badiozaman	2 July 1974	1 January 1976	1 year, 183 days	
3	Sulaiman Kudus	Lieutenant Colonel; Sulaiman Kudus	2 January 1976	26 December 1977	1 year, 358 days	
4	Khairudin Shaarin	Lieutenant Colonel; Khairudin Shaarin	27 December 1977	6 August 1978	222 days	
5	C. A. Loone	Lieutenant Colonel; C. A. Loone	7 August 1978	30 June 1980	1 year, 328 days	
6	Wan Mohamed Ahmad	Lieutenant Colonel; Wan Mohamed Ahmad	1 July 1980	31 December 1981	1 year, 183 days	
7	Vethakan Pakian Nathan	Lieutenant Colonel; Vethakan Pakian Nathan	1 January 1982	31 January 1984	2 years, 30 days	
8	Pak Wan Chek Hashim	Lieutenant Colonel; Pak Wan Chek Hashim	1 February 1984	31 December 1986	2 years, 333 days	
9	Muhamad Afifi Kasim	Lieutenant Colonel; Muhamad Afifi Kasim	21 January 1987	13 August 1989	2 years, 204 days	
10	Aziz Rashid	Lieutenant Colonel; Aziz Rashid	14 August 1989	2 January 1992	2 years, 141 days	
11	Awie Suboh	Lieutenant Colonel; Awie Suboh (born 1953)	3 January 1992	30 June 1994	2 years, 178 days	
12	John Derick @ Osman Ab Jalil	Lieutenant Colonel; John Derick @ Osman Ab Jalil	1 July 1994	30 June 1996	1 year, 365 days	
13	Ranjit Singh Ramday	Lieutenant Colonel; Ranjit Singh Ramday	1 July 1996	9 October 1999	3 years, 100 days	
14	Toh Choon Siang	Lieutenant Colonel; Toh Choon Siang	10 October 1999	2 July 2002	2 years, 265 days	
15	Shaari Baba	Lieutenant Colonel; Shaari Baba	3 July 2002	29 July 2004	2 years, 26 days	
16	Lim Kiat Choy	Lieutenant Colonel; Lim Kiat Choy	30 July 2004	1 August 2006	2 years, 2 days	
17	Khalid Sah Hamzah	Lieutenant Colonel; Khalid Sah Hamzah	2 August 2006	14 January 2008	1 year, 165 days	
18	Zainuddin Mustafa	Lieutenant Colonel; Zainuddin Mustafa	15 January 2008	30 June 2008	167 days	
19	Rosli Bahrun	Lieutenant Colonel; Rosli Bahrun	1 July 2008	3 August 2010	2 years, 33 days	
20	Ivan Lee Synn Leng	Lieutenant Colonel; Ivan Lee Synn Leng	4 August 2010	15 July 2012	1 year, 346 days	
21	Norulhisyam Md Shuib	Lieutenant Colonel; Norulhisyam Md Shuib	16 July 2012	15 July 2014	1 year, 364 days	
22	Akasah Mastar	Lieutenant Colonel; Akasah Mastar	16 July 2014	10 January 2017	2 years, 178 days	
23	Muhammad Samzie Gusang	Lieutenant Colonel; Muhammad Samzie Gusang	11 January 2017	21 March 2019	2 years, 69 days	
24	Zulkifli Raub	Lieutenant Colonel; Zulkifli Raub	22 March 2019	21 August 2020	1 year, 153 days	
25	Zahari Affandi Mat Nor	Lieutenant Colonel; Zahari Affandi Mat Nor	22 August 2020	23 February 2023	2 years, 185 days	
26	Yusrin Azuan Abd Aziz	Lieutenant Colonel; Yusrin Azuan Abd Aziz	24 February 2023	Incumbent	2 years, 246 days	

== Notable members ==
- Kanang Langkau – Warrant Officer I (Rtd.) Temenggung Datuk Kanang anak Langkau, SP PGB PGBK PBS, (2 March 1945–3 January 2013) was a legendary Malaysian war hero and the only recipient of both the Grand Knight of Valour (SP) and the Star of the Commander of Valour (PGB) for his gallantry during operations at the Perak–Kelantan border in 1979 and 1980. Born in Sarikei, Sarawak, he began his military career as an Iban Tracker with the British Army's 42 Commando in 1962, later serving with 1 RNZIR before joining the Malaysian Army in 1973. He rose to become UCIS platoon sergeant and regimental sergeant major of the 8th Ranger Battalion. Following his retirement as Warrant Officer I, he was appointed Temenggung (Paramount Leader) of the Iban people.
- Micheal Riman Bugat – Major (Rtd.) Quartermaster Micheal Riman anak Bugat, PGB, (born 8 March 1954, Saribas, Sarawak) is a decorated Malaysian Army veteran from Saribas, Sarawak, honoured with the Star of the Commander of Valour (PGB) for his bravery during the 1979 Raid on Korbu Reserve Forest while serving as a corporal in the UCIS Platoon, 8th Ranger, alongside Sergeant Kanang Langkau. He enlisted on 22 June 1973, began his career with the 8th Ranger Battalion, was later commissioned as an officer, and retired with the rank of Major Quartermaster after 31 years of dedicated service.
- Beliang Bali – Warrant Officer I (Rtd.) Beliang anak Bali, PGB, (born 6 October 1953, Sri Aman, Sarawak) is a Malaysian war hero from Sri Aman, Sarawak, honoured with the Star of the Commander of Valour (PGB) for his gallantry during the 1977 Battle of Gopeng. As a Lance Corporal in the Ngelaban Platoon, he bravely defended his wounded comrades, including Captain Patrick Wong Sing Nang, against overwhelming odds until reinforcements arrived. He served 21 years in the Malaysian Army and retired with the rank of Warrant Officer I.
- Awie Suboh – Lieutenant General (Rtd.) Dato' Awie bin Suboh, DPMJ, (born 1953, Sri Aman, Sarawak) is a trailblazing military leader from Sri Aman, Sarawak, and the first Sarawakian to attain the rank of three-star general in the Malaysian Armed Forces. Commissioned on 15 May 1975 after enlisting in 1972, he began his career with the 4th Ranger and later led the 8th Ranger as one of Malaysia's pioneer infantry paratroopers. A graduate of the Special Forces Selection, he held key commands including the 9th Infantry Brigade, the elite 21st Special Service Group, and ultimately the 1st Infantry Division, retiring on 13 November 2011. He also served as Deputy Chief of Army, concluding a distinguished 39-year career.
