= Kanang anak Langkau =

Malaysian soldier

Yang Berbahagia Datuk Kanang Anak Langkau SP PGB PGBK PBS
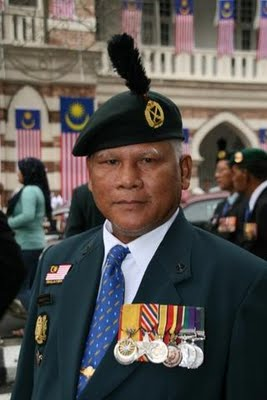
- Born: 2 March 1945; Julau, 3rd Division, Kingdom of Sarawak (Now under Sarikei Division, Sarawak, Malaysia)
- Died: 3 January 2013 (aged 67); Kuching, Sarawak, Malaysia
- Military career
- Allegiance: United Kingdom (1962–1963); Malaysia (1963–2013)
- Branch: British Army (1962–1963); Malaysian Army (1963–1983)
- Service years: 1962–1983
- Rank: Warrant Officer 1
- Unit: Sarawak Rangers (British Army) Royal Ranger Regiment (Malaysian Army)
- Commands: 8th Rangers Regimental Sergeant Major
- Conflicts: Indonesia-Malaysia Confrontation (1962–1966); Communist insurgency in Malaysia (1968–89)
- Awards: Seri Pahlawan Gagah Perkasa (SP); Panglima Gagah Berani (PGB); Panglima Gemilang Bintang Kenyalang (PGBK); Pegawai Bintang Sarawak (PBS)

Kanang Anak Langkau (2 March 1945 – 3 January 2013) was a Malaysian soldier from the Iban Dayak community in Sarawak. He was in the Royal Ranger Regiment and Regimental Sergeant Major of 8 Renjer (8th Rangers) of the Malaysian Army with his tag number 901378. He was awarded the Panglima Gagah Berani and Seri Pahlawan Gagah Perkasa medals from the Yang di-Pertuan Agong, Sultan Ahmad Shah on 3 June 1981. He is the only recipient of both the Seri Pahlawan Gagah Perkasa and Pingat Gagah Berani, and was the last living recipient of the Seri Pahlawan Gagah Perkasa.

== Early life and military service ==
Kanang anak Langkau was born on 2 March 1945 in Julau, Sarawak. He entered military service with the British Army, as an Iban Tracker, attending Jungle Warfare School in Ulu Tiram in early 1962. Kanang was attached to the 42 Commando serving during the Brunei Revolt and during the Indonesia-Malaysia Confrontation. He later served with the Royal New Zealand Infantry Regiment. He was absorbed into the Sarawak Rangers which eventually became part of the Malaysian Rangers when Malaysia was formed on 16 September 1963.

Kanang joined the Sarawak Rangers as an Iban tracker on 21 April 1962, under the recruitment efforts of the late Bennett Jarrow. At that time, the Sarawak Rangers were part of the British Army but later became part of the Malaysian Army's Royal Ranger Regiment following the formation of Malaysia on 16 September 1963, which included the Federation of Malaya, Singapore, Sabah (then North Borneo), and Sarawak. Singapore later separated, and Brunei opted not to join.

During an operation in the Korbu Forest Reserve at Fort Legap on 1 June 1979, Sergeant Kanang's team encountered an resting camp of communist insurgents while tracking enemy forces. Despite being outnumbered, Sergeant Kanang, from the 8th Battalion Royal Rangers, initiated an attack on the camp. Two Rangers were wounded in the battle, while five enemy combatants were killed, and equipment was seized. For his bravery, Sergeant Kanang was awarded the "Pingat Gagah Berani", the highest honor for gallantry, by His Majesty the King.

In an incident in Tanah Hitam, Perak, on 8 February 1980, a soldier was killed. Kanang, leading a platoon, was sent to track the enemy down and eliminate them. For eleven days, they tracked the enemy until they stumbled upon a much larger enemy force at Ladang Kinding, Sungei Siput, Perak. Kanang successfully tracked down the enemy. Eleven days after the death of the soldier, he managed to track and identify the enemy's route of escape. On 19 February 1980 at around 1500, after conducting a reconnaissance, his platoon estimated the location of the enemy, which was located near their location. They were actually inside the location of the enemy.

At that moment, Sergeant Kanang was approximately 8 metres from the enemy sentry's location. Realizing that, he launched an assault towards the right by firing towards the right of the enemy with his platoon. After launching the attack, they realised that the enemy's main force was on the left, below the slope of the hill. He switched the direction of the assault to the left. They ploughed through the enemy but a large force of the enemy escaped. The platoon and Kanang managed to capture five communist terrorists on that day. Sergeant Kanang was repeatedly shot, he took three rounds from the enemy into his body. He was in a coma for two months in the hospital but recuperated and was back on active duty.

== Honors ==
For his service, Kanang was awarded the nation's two highest awards, Sri Pahlawan Perkasa (SP) and Panglima Gagah Berani (PGB) by His Majesty the Yang Di-Pertuan Agong Sultan Ahmad Shah in June 1981. He retired as Warrant Officer One (WOI) after serving in the army for more than 21 years.

== Retirement and recognition ==
Kanang retired after 21 years of service as a First Warrant Officer. He was the Temenggong (paramount chief) of the Iban in Sri Aman, his place of residence. He was awarded the Officer of the Most Exalted Order of the Star of Sarawak (PBS) (Malay: Pegawai Bintang Sarawak) in 1987.

There were six holders of the Sri Pahlawan (SP) Gagah Perkasa (the Gallantry Award) from Sarawak, and with the death of Kanang anak Langkau, there was one SP holder in the person of Sgt. Ngalinuh (an Orang Ulu). The heroes were 21 holders of Panglima Gagah Berani (PGB), with 16 survivors. Of the total, there are fourteen Ibans, one Bidayuh, one Kayan, one Malay and two Chinese army officers. But the majorities in the Armed Forces are Malays, according to the book Crimson Tide over Borneo. The youngest PGB holder is ASP Wilfred Gomez of the Police Force.

Kanang anak Langkau was the holder of both the SP and the PGB. His contributions were initially not rewarded, except he received pensions. Angered by the treatment, Kanang refused the title of Datuk offered to him, saying that he was a poor man and could not afford to receive this title. Kanang was later made a Temenggong for the Iban community of Sri Aman division, and last year he was conferred a Datukship by the state government.

On 15 April 2009, he made headlines after rescuing a baby orangutan from captivity with his friend, Tay Choon Yong. The baby orangutan was being handed over to Semenggoh Wildlife Centre.

On 24 September 2011, he was conferred the Commander of the Order of the Star of Hornbill Sarawak (PGBK) (Panglima Gemilang Bintang Kenyalang) with the title of Datuk by Abang Muhammad Salahuddin, the Head of State's 90th Birthday.

In 2011, Kanang supervised Operation Mai Pulai. This operation involved the locating and exhumation of the remains of 21 Iban Trackers and Sarawak Rangers who were killed during the Second Malayan Emergency. Their remains were exhumed from multiple locations on the Malay Peninsula and returned to Sarawak, where they were ceremonially reburied in July 2011.

== Death and Funeral ==
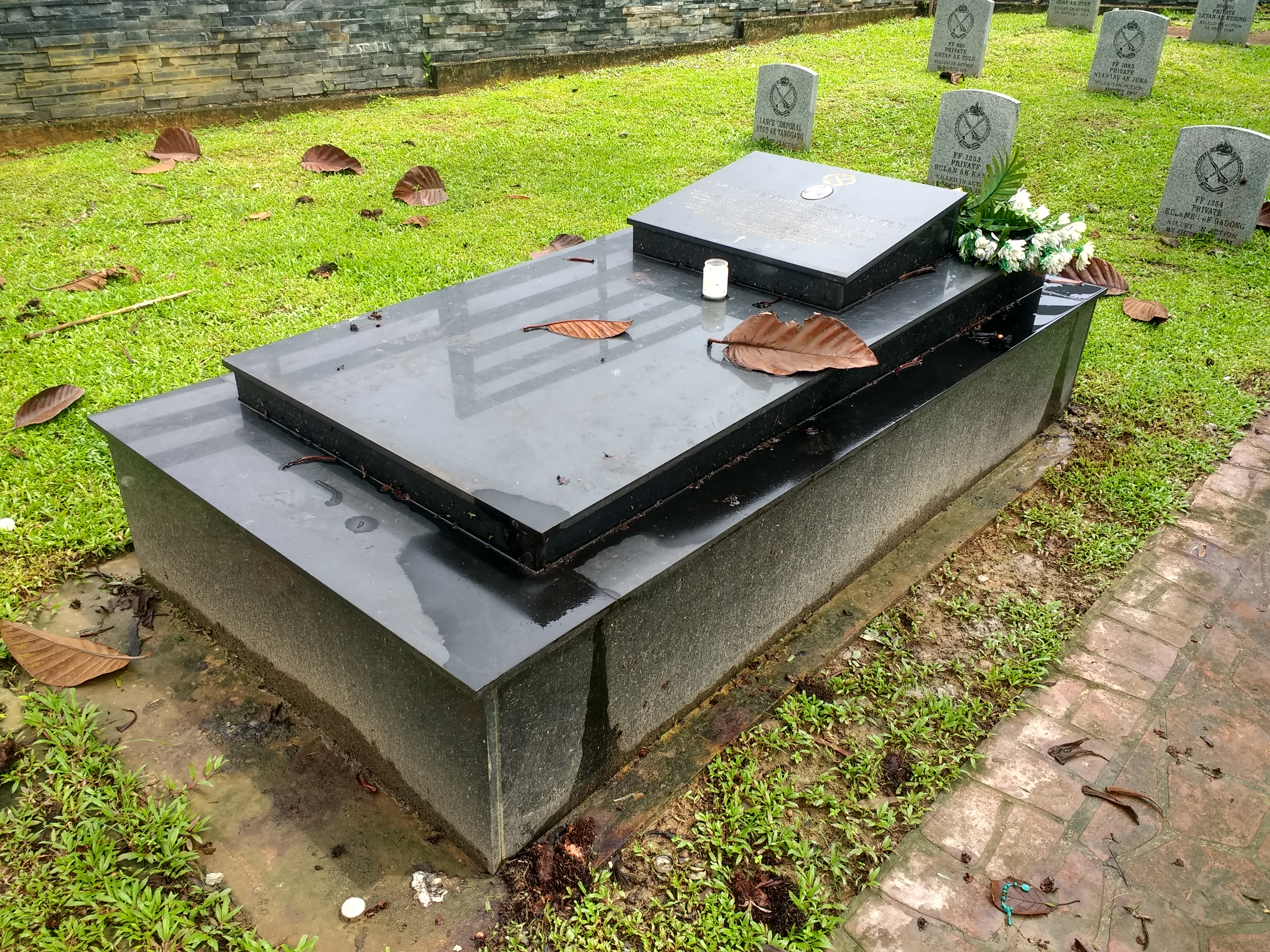
Kanang anak Langkau's grave at Kuching Heroes' Cemetery

On 3 January 2013, he collapsed while watching television at home in Sungai Apong, Sri Aman, after complaining of chest pains. He was immediately rushed to the Sarawak General Hospital, and later pronounced dead at the age of 67.

He was buried on 6 January with full military honours at the Heroes' Grave at Jalan Budaya, Kuching. Messages of condolences and sympathy have been received by the family of the late Kanang from government leaders, including Malaysian Prime Minister Najib Tun Razak and Sarawak Chief Minister Abdul Taib Mahmud.

According to the Minister of Defence, Datuk Seri Ahmad Zahid Hamidi, he will be given a national burial. His coffin, draped in the Jalur Gemilang and the colours of the Malaysian Armed Forces, was first brought to the 1st Infantry Division base located at Bukavu Camp in Penrissen for the family members and friends to perform prayers and the miring ceremony (offering ceremony), before being brought to Kuching Civic Centre for the public. He was buried at the Heroes' Grave in Jalan Taman Budaya, after the funeral prayers at St. Thomas Cathedral in Kuching.

Among Ibans, Kanang's acts in the military service are regarded as "raja berani tau serang", with the highest widower fee for the Great War Leader. Otherwise, his temenggong chieftain title entitled him to be the fifth widower fee.

== Honours and awards ==
=== Military honours and awards ===
- Seri Pahlawan Gagah Perkasa (SP) (Supreme Gallantry Award)
- Panglima Gagah Berani (PGB) (Star of the Commander of Valour)
- Pingat Perkhidmatan Am (PPA) (Federation General Service Medal)
- Pingat Perkhidmatan Setia (Federation Loyal Service Medal)
- Pingat Jasa Malaysia (Malaysia Service Medal)
- General Service Medal (1918) (United Kingdom) with "Brunei" clasp (for the participation in Brunei Revolt)
- General Service Medal (1962) (United Kingdom) with "Borneo" clasp (for the participation in Indonesia-Malaysia Confrontation)

=== State honours and awards ===
- Panglima Gemilang Bintang Kenyalang (PGBK) (Commander of the Star of the Hornbill of Sarawak) (2011)
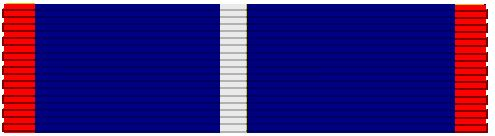
- Pegawai Bintang Sarawak (PBS) (Most Exalted Order of the Star of Sarawak-Officer) (1987)

== Legacy ==
- A Malay language novel used in secondary schools in Malaysia called Kanang, Cerita Seorang Pahlawan ("Kanang, The Hero's Story"), written by Mazlan Nordin, is a story about Kanang anak Langkau.
- A Netflix movie titled Kanang anak Langkau: The Iban Warrior that was streamed since 2017.

== See also ==
- Communist insurgency in Malaysia (1968–89)
