= 11th Strategic Division =

- Divisyen Ke-11 Strategik
- Active: 1969–1993
- Country: Malaysia
- Branch: Malaysian Army
- Type: Combat division
- Garrison/HQ: Camp Imphal, Kuala Lumpur
- Nickname: "XI Division"

Commanders
- Notable commanders: Major General Abdul Ghani Abdullah

The 11th Strategic Division (Malay: Divisyen ke-11 Strategik; Abbr.: 11 DIV STRAT), stylised XI Division, was a division-sized combat formation of the Malaysian Army.

It was unique as the only such formation composed entirely of army reserve personnel from the Malaysian Armed Forces Reserve until it was transformed into a strategic defence division on 2 May 1984. Over its operational history, the division underwent significant transformations before being disbanded on 31 December 1993, with its remnants integrated into the Malaysian Army Training and Doctrine Command.

== History ==
=== Formation as an infantry combat division ===
The division was established in 1969 as the 11th Infantry Division at Camp Damansara, Kuala Lumpur, with a primary role of defending Peninsular Malaysia in the event of armed conflict. Its creation resulted from a collaboration between the Ministry of Defence and the University of Malaya, which sought to establish a garrison for its reserve army, the 1st (University of Malaya) Reserve Army Battalion, Territorial Army. Under this agreement, the federal government constructed the garrison on university-owned land, which was shared with the 11th Infantry Division's headquarters.

The division's headquarters remained at Camp Damansara until 1984, when it was relocated to Camp Imphal in Kuala Lumpur. The 8th Infantry Brigade was among the formations under the division's command.

=== Transition to a reserve army formation ===
On 1 January 1980, the division was restructured and redesignated as the 11th Reserve Army Division (Malay: Divisyen ke-11 Pasukan Simpanan Tentera Darat; Abbr.: 11 DIV (PSTD)). Its new role was to coordinate all reserve units within the Malaysian Army, centralising their operations and improving discipline and logistics, which were previously decentralised. (Note: Since 1984, the Malaysian Army reserve units have been permanently integrated with regular army divisions. With this support, the 11th Reserve Army Division was no longer necessary.)

=== Development into a strategic defence formation ===
On 2 May 1984, the 11th Reserve Army Division evolved into the 11th Strategic Division, with a renewed focus on strategic defence. This included experimenting with military strategy and logistics to provide the Malaysian Army with a combat advantage.

As part of its new role, the division trained selected units for specialised capabilities. Notably, on 1 January 1987, the 8th Battalion, Royal Rangers, was designated as an airborne unit to assess its combat effectiveness. The success of this initiative led to the conversion of the 9th Battalion, Royal Malays (in late 1990) and the 17th Battalion, Royal Malays (in 1992) to airborne roles.

At its height, the division commanded units such as Task Force 083 (now the 10th Parachute Brigade) and the 8th Squadron, Royal Army Engineers Regiment.

=== Dissolution ===
The division was officially disbanded on 31 December 1993. Its personnel and facilities were absorbed into the newly created Malaysian Army Training and Doctrine Command, marking the end of the 11th Strategic Division's legacy.
