= Kuching Heroes' Cemetery =

Cemetery in Sarawak, Malaysia

Kuching Heroes' Mausoleum
- Malaysian Armed Forces Department of Veterans Affairs; Ministry of Defence (Malaysia)
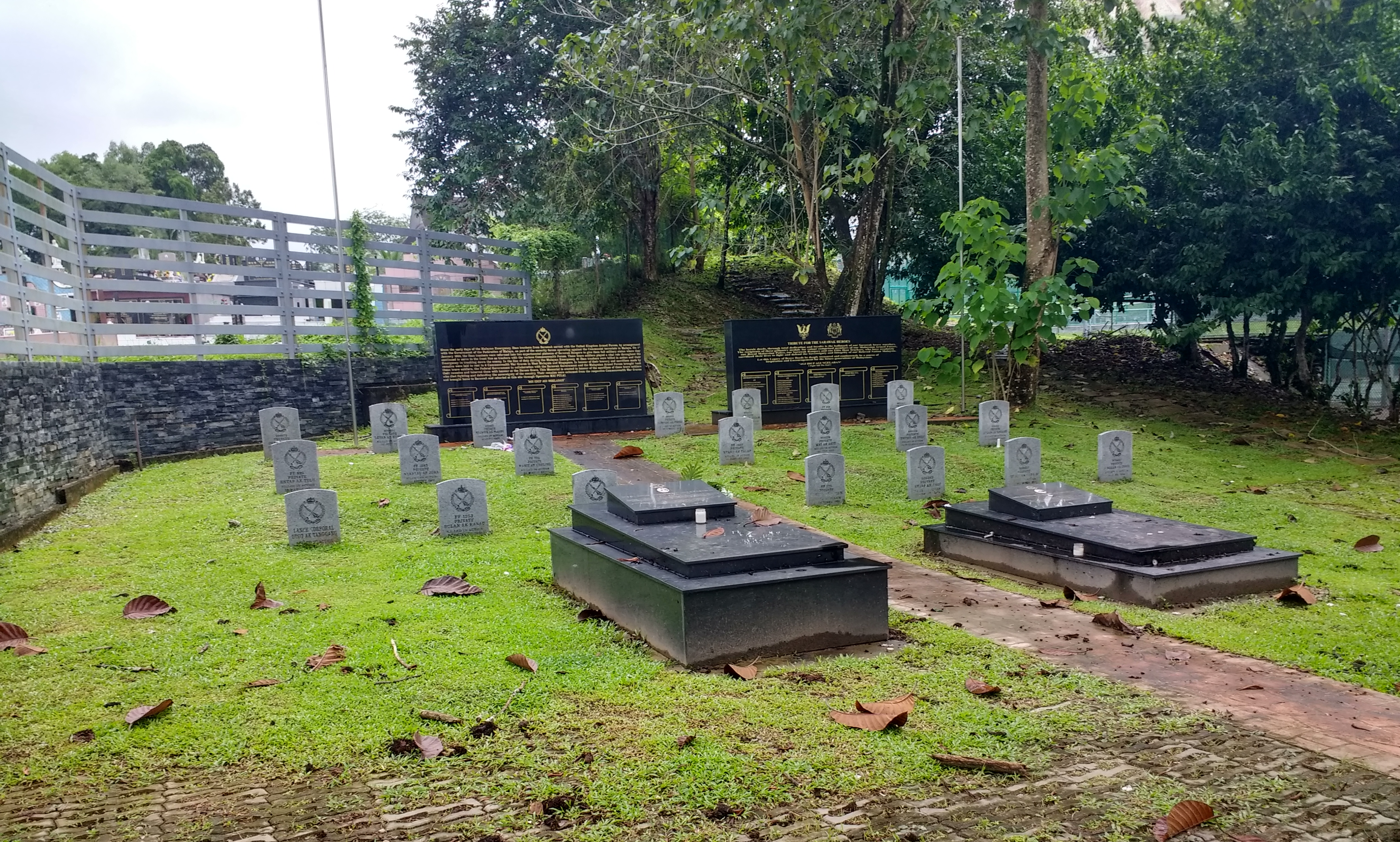
- Used for those deceased 2011–present
- Established: 2011
- Location: 1°32′58″N 110°20′33″E near Kuching, Sarawak, Malaysia
- Total burials: 23

Burials by nation
- Specific figures are not available

Burials by war
- Malayan Emergency (1948–1960): 21; Communist insurgency in Malaysia (1968–89): 2 Lahad Datu Standoff (2013): 1

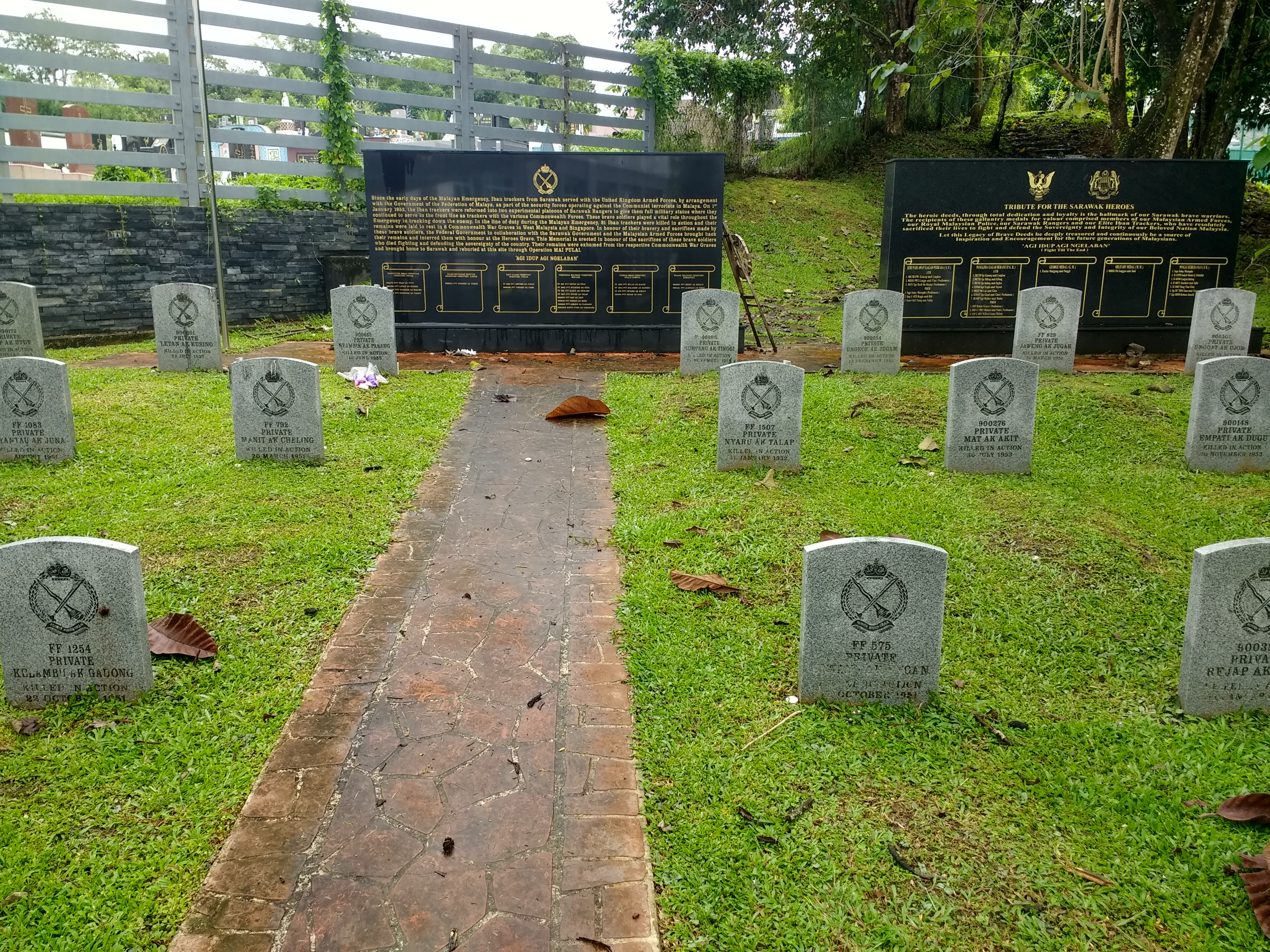
Kuching Heroes Cemetery

Kuching Heroes' Cemetery is a mausoleum located in Kuching, Sarawak, Malaysia. This cemetery is located at Jalan Taman Budaya, and is reserved for military personnel, police and others regarded as exhibiting bravery and fortitude.

== Commemoration ==
On 29 August 2016, a ceremony for the Ceasefire and Declaration of the end of the Indonesian Confrontation was held in the cemetery. The following year on 29 August 2017, a commemoration and thanksgiving service by the New Zealand Malayan Veterans Association (NZMVA) also held in the site.

== Inscription ==
Since the early days of Malayan Emergency. Iban Trackers from Sarawak served with the United Kingdom Armed Forces by arrangement with the Government of the Federation of Malaya, as part of the security forces operating against with the Communist terrorist in Malaya. On 1 January 1953, the Iban Trackers were reformed into two experimental platoons of Sarawak Rangers to give them fully military status where they continued to serve in the front line as trackers with the various Commonwealth Forces. These brave soldiers played a vital role throughout the remains were laid to rest in 6 Commonwealth War Graves in West Malaysia and Singapore. In honour to their bravery and sacrifices made by these brave soldiers, the Federal Government in collaboration with the Sarawak Government and the Malaysian Armed Forces their remains and interred them with honour at the Heroes Grave. This Memorial is erected in honour of the sacrifice of these brave soldiers who died fighting and defending the sovereignty of the country. Their remains were exhumed from the respective Commonwealth War Graves and brought home to Sarawak and reburied at this site through Operation MAI PULAI.

"AGI IDUP AGI NGELABAN"

== Notable burials ==
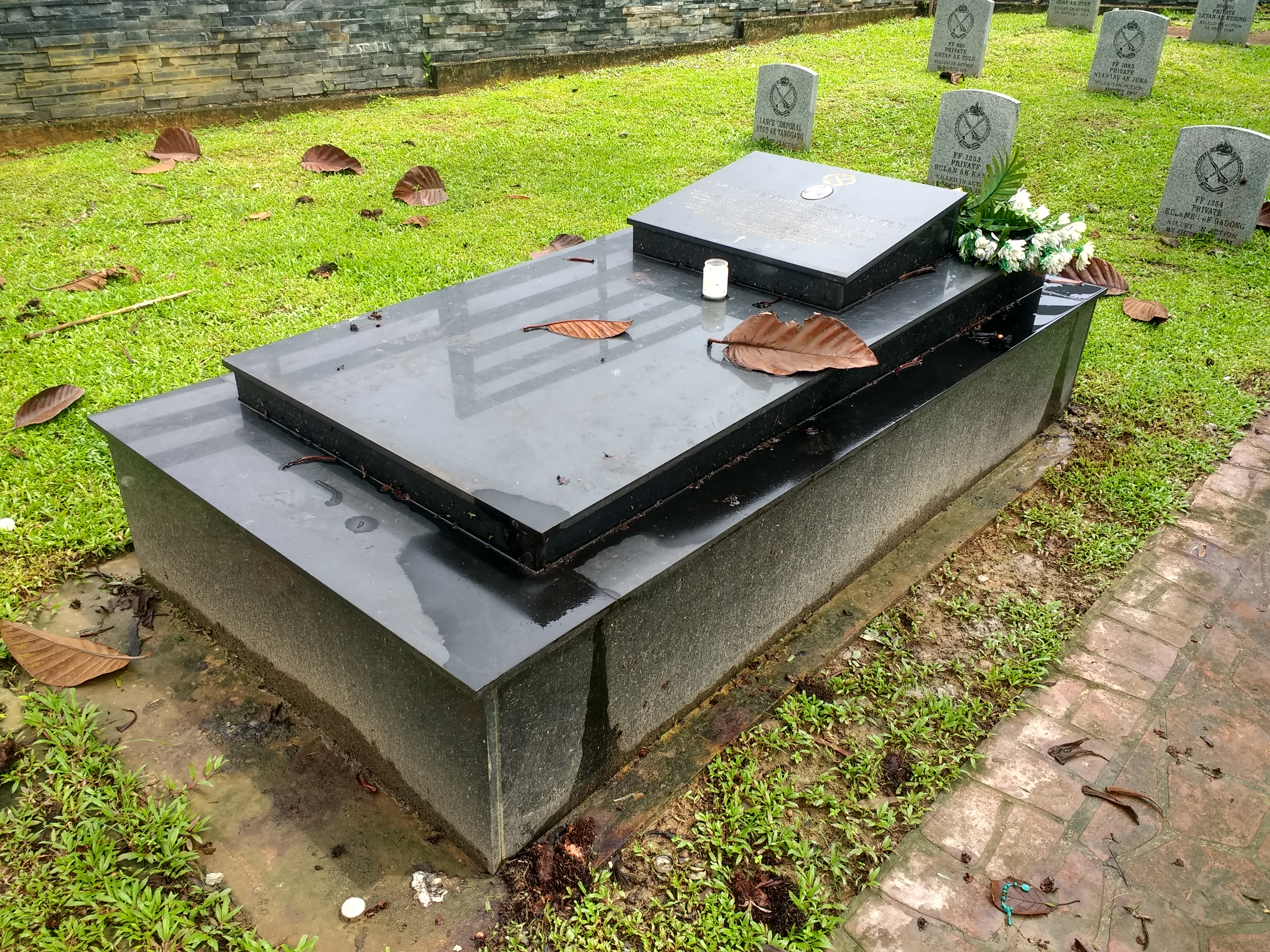
Grave of Kanang anak Langkau

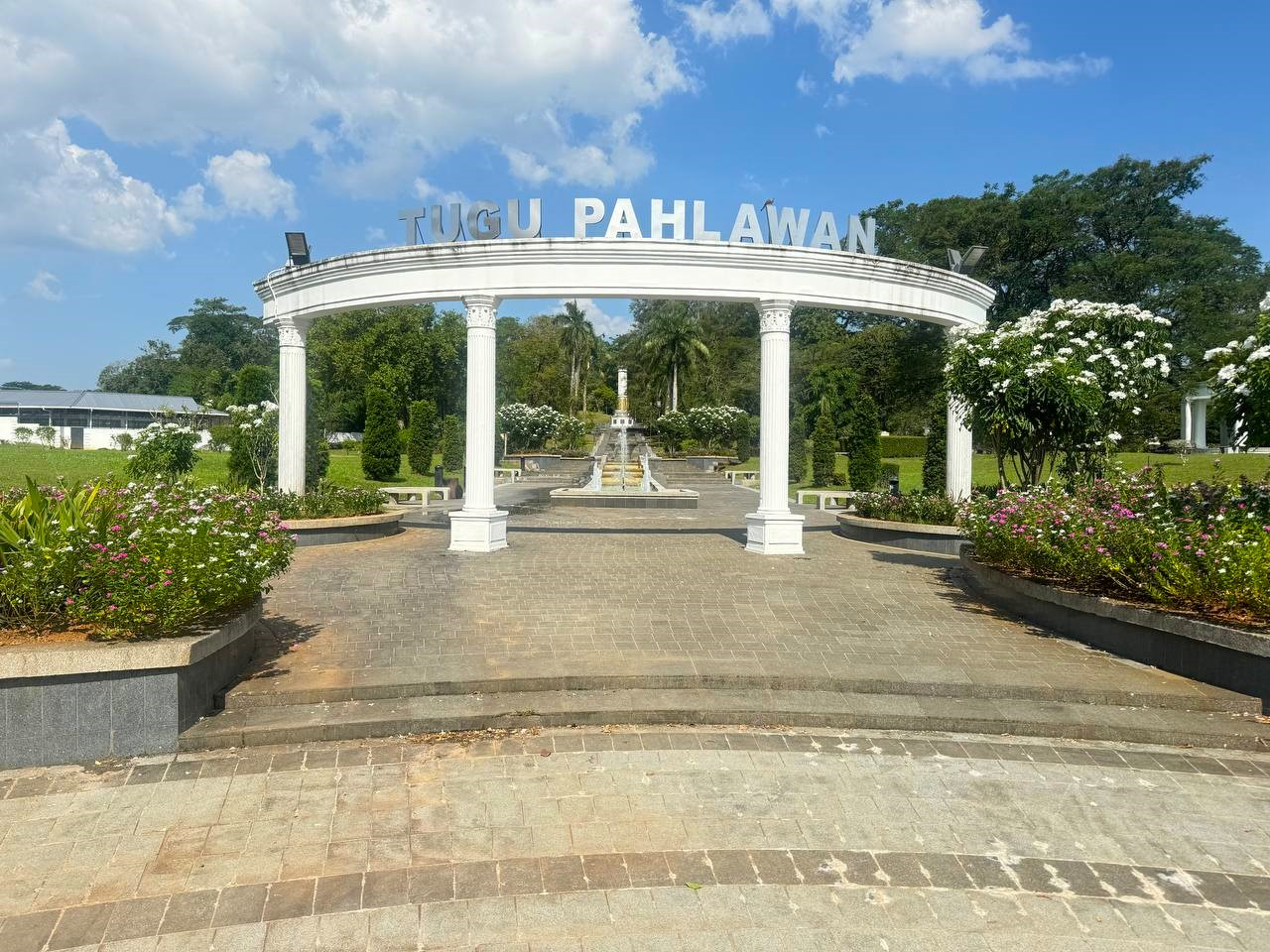
Tugu Pahlawan

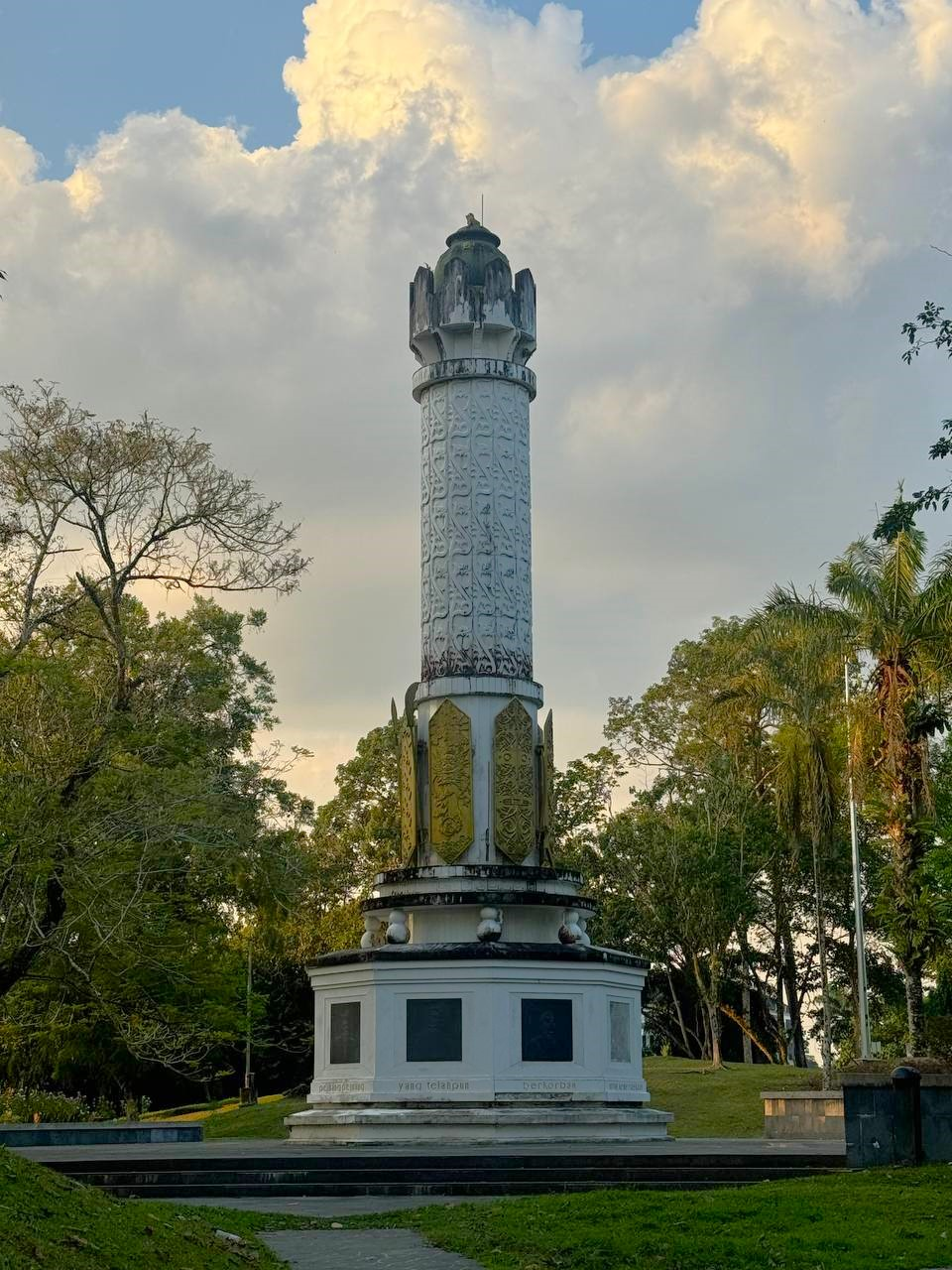
Tugu Pahlawan

- 21 Iban Trackers during Malayan Emergency (1948–1960) (relocated from Peninsular Malaysia and Singapore during Ops Mai Pulai operation in 2011).
- Kanang anak Langkau – Iban soldier and hero during Communist insurgency in Malaysia (1968–89) (died 2013).
- ASP Micheal anak Padel – one of the police officers killed during the 2013 Lahad Datu standoff (died 2013).
- Awang anak Raweng (1929–2020), recipient of the George Cross
- Major (QM) Michael Riman anak Bugat (1950–2023), recipient of the PGB during Communist Insurgency in Malaysia and friend Kanang anak Langkau during Operation Setia in 1979
