= Edward Gopsill =

- Born: 22 December 1921; Birkenhead, England
- Died: 25 July 2016 (aged 94)
- Military career
- Allegiance: United Kingdom
- Branch: British Army
- Service years: c.1939–1967
- Rank: Lieutenant-Colonel
- Commands: 1st Malaysian Rangers
- Conflicts: Second World War; Malayan Emergency; Indonesia–Malaysia confrontation
- Awards: Distinguished Service Order; Officer of the Order of the British Empire; Military Cross; Mentioned in Despatches

Lieutenant-Colonel Edward Gopsill, DSO, OBE, MC (22 December 1921 – 25 July 2016) was a decorated British Army officer and founder of the 1st Malaysian Rangers.

== Early life ==
Gopsill was born in Birkenhead in 1921. He left school at fourteen and took a job with a brick-making company as his family was suffering financial hardship. He continued his education at nightschool where he studied accountancy.

== Military career ==
Gopsill enlisted in The King’s (Liverpool) Regiment at the outbreak of the Second World War. His capabilities were noticed and he was selected for officer training. In 1942 he was commissioned into the 1st Gurkha Rifles and served with the 3rd Battalion in Burma. At the age of 23 he was awarded the Military Cross for his actions in Cochin-China.

In 1947 Gopsill transferred to the 7th Gurkha Rifles as his former regiment had been incorporated into the new Indian Army. He was posted to Malaya where a communist insurgency had started. In 1949 he was awarded the Distinguished Service Order for his exemplary bravery.

Gopsill was subsequently asked to raise a new regiment. Within 18 months he had recruited and trained one hundred local Iban tribesmen to form the 1st Malaysian Rangers. He then led them into action during Indonesia's confrontation with the newly formed Malaysia.

Gopsill's proficiency in jungle warfare led to him becoming chief instructor at the Brigade of Gurkhas Training Depot. In 1965 he was appointed an Officer of the Order of the British Empire for his services to the Malaysian Armed Forces.

== Later life ==
Gopsill left the army in 1967 and spent his remaining working life as the bursar and clerk to the governors at the Royal Wolverhampton School.

Towards the end of his life he successfully campaigned to have a monument erected to the Gurkha regiments at the National Memorial Arboretum in Staffordshire.
