= Reggie anak Deli =

Former Malaysian police officer

Reggie anak Deli SP
- Born: 15 March 1934; Simunjan, Kingdom of Sarawak
- Died: 14 July 2012 (aged 78); Sarawak
- Burial place: Anglican cemetery, Batu Kitang
- Spouse: Piah Andar (d.1990)
- Children: 3 boys, 2 daughters
- Military career
- Allegiance: Malaysia
- Branch: Royal Malaysia Police
- Service years: 1961-1986
- Rank: Inspector
- Service number: I/4928
- Unit: General Operations Force

Inspector Reggie anak Deli (15 March 1934 - 14 July 2012) was a Malaysian police officer.

== Early life ==
Deli was born on 15 March 1934 in Simunjan, Sarawak to an Iban family. He got an education until Junior Cambridge.

== Career ==
Reggie anak Deli joined the Police Force on 27 July 1961 as a Police Constable. His basic training came at Bukit Siol Police Training School in Kuching, Sarawak. He was then assigned to Kuching District Police Headquarters on 13 March 1962 as a General Duty Member. He was promoted to Police Corporal on 1 April 1967 and assigned to the 18th battalion of Police Field Force (now General Operations Force) at Miri, Sarawak.

On 15 August 1969, he was promoted to Police Sergeant and dispatched to Bukit Siol Police Training School as an instructor. On 1 November 1969, he was placed in the 15th battalion of Police Field Force at Sibu, Sarawak, holding the position of Platoon Sergeant. On 13 March 1973, he was reassigned to the Police Field Force Branch of Sarawak Brigade. Later, on 1 June 1973, he was promoted to Inspector and duty as Guardian Officer of the 18th battalion of Police Field Force at Miri, Sarawak. On 5 February 1977, he transferred to the 14th battalion of Police Field Force at Kuching, Sarawak and he served as the company's Acting Guardian Officer before retiring from service on 7 March 1986.

=== Heroic action ===
Reggie anak Deli led a 6-man force on 10 April 1973. They tracked down and confronted 14 communists travelling in a boat along Sungai Kemena in Sebauh, Bintulu. In the ensuing 20-minute gun battle, the outnumbered team killed six of the insurgents, captured the rest, and seized seven shotguns, 13 bullets, medical supplies and important documents. After this action, he was awarded the Grand Knight of Valour, the highest gallantry federal award.

== Death ==
On 14 July 2012, Reggie died at the age of 78 in Sarawak.

== Honours ==
- Malaysia :
  - Recipient of the Grand Knight of Valour (S.P.) (1973)
