= Paul Kiong =

Former Malaysian police officer

Yang Berbahagia Datuk Paul Kiong SP PMW PPP PKH PKB PPA PPM
- Born: 24 October 1944 (age 81); Ipoh, Perak, Japanese occupation of Malaya
- Military career
- Allegiance: Malaysia
- Branch: Royal Malaysia Police
- Service years: 1967-1998
- Rank: Superintendent of Police
- Service number: G/6160
- Unit: Special Branch
- Conflicts: Communist insurgency in Malaysia (1968–1989)
- Awards: Grand Knight of Valour

Paul Kiong (born 24 October 1944) is a retired Malaysian police officer.

== Early life and education ==
Paul Kiong was born in Ipoh, Perak on 24 October 1944, during the Japanese occupation of Malaya. He was the fourth child of six siblings.

Kiong completed his secondary school education in 1962, obtaining a Higher School Certificate.

== Police career ==
Kiong joined the Royal Malaysia Police on 16 April 1967 as a Police Constable. After completing training, he was posted to Johor Special Branch. Due to his outstanding performance, he was promoted on the 1 January 1976 to Probationary Inspector, and was posted to Perak Special Branch.

On 11 July 1977, he was promoted to Inspector. During this time he was sent into the jungle to hunt down communist rebels. He reportedly captured 43 communist rebels without bloodshed. Kiong was promoted to Acting Assistant Superintendent of Police on 1 June 1983, and Assistant Superintendent of Police on 13 May 1986. In 1990, he was posted to Bukit Aman Special Branch. Kiong would later be promoted to Deputy Superintendent of Police on 1 January 1992. On 25 September 1996, he was promoted to Superintendent of Police. Kiong retired on 1 February 1998, ending 31 years of service in the police force.

== Honours ==
- Malaysia
  - Recipient of the Grand Knight of Valour (SP) (1983)
  - Recipient of the Active Service Medal (PKB)
  - Recipient of the General Service Medal (PPA)
  - Recipient of the Malaysian Commemorative Medal (Bronze) (PPM (G))
- Royal Malaysia Police
  - Warrior of the Most Gallant Police Order (PPP) (1996)
- Federal Territory (Malaysia)
  - Commander of the Order of the Territorial Crown (PMW) – Datuk (2011)
- Perak
  - Recipient of the Conspicuous Gallantry Medal (PKH) (1988)
