= Mat Aznan Awang =

Malaysian Army soldier

Mat Aznan Awang SP BKK
- Born: 28 December 1960; Kampung Parit Panjang, Baling, Kedah, Federation of Malaya
- Died: 4 October 1993 (aged 32); Mogadishu, Somalia
- Military career
- Allegiance: Malaysia
- Branch: Malaysian Armed Forces: Malaysian Army
- Service years: 1980–1993
- Rank: Lance Corporal Corporal (posthumous)
- Unit: 19th Battalion Royal Malay Regiment
- Commands: Malaysian Battilion (MALBATT); United Nations Operation in Somalia II (UNOSOM II)
- Conflicts: Communist insurgency in Malaysia (1968–89); Battle of Mogadishu (1993) †
- Awards: Seri Pahlawan Gagah Perkasa (SP)

Corporal Mat Aznan bin Awang (28 December 1960 – 4 October 1993) was a Malaysian Army soldier who served in the Malaysia Battalion (MALBATT) of the United Nations Operation in Somalia II (UNOSOM II). Mat Aznan was posthumously awarded the Seri Pahlawan Gagah Perkasa (SP) for his actions during the Battle of Mogadishu in October 1993. He was a Royal Malay Regiment soldier and hailed from Kampung Parit Panjang, Baling, Kedah.

== Battle of Mogadishu ==
On 4 October 1993, Mat Aznan was involved in the rescue mission of seventy US Rangers and five members of the US Air Force who were surrounded in the Bakaara Market area of Mogadishu, Somalia.

During the rescue operation, Mat Aznan acted as a driver of a Condor Armoured Personnel Carrier (APC).

While in transit, the rescue convoy was ambushed and the armoured car driven by him was shot at by anti-tank weapons from the front. This penetrated the bullet-proof window, killing him and wounding nine others.

In this incident, four Condor APC vehicles were destroyed. However, the rescue efforts of US military personnel was successfully executed by MALBATT.

== Honours ==
Mat Aznan Awang was awarded the Seri Pahlawan Gagah Perkasa (SP) from the 10th Yang di-Pertuan Agong, Almarhum Tuanku Jaafar of Negeri Sembilan on 4 June 1994. He was posthumously promoted to Corporal by the Malaysian Army.

- Malaysia
  - Recipient of the Grand Knight of Valour (SP) (1994)
- Kedah
  - Bronze star of State of Kedah Star of Valour (BKK) (1994)

== Legacy ==
One of Mat Aznan's daughters continues the legacy by serving in the same battalion.
