= Royal Ranger Regiment =

Military unit in Malaysian Armed Force

- Rejimen Renjer Diraja
- Cap Badge of the Rejimen Renjer DiRaja
- Active: 1862 (as Sarawak Rangers)–present
- Country: Malaysia
- Branch: Malaysian Army
- Type: Light infantry
- Role: Foot guards, public duties (one battalion); Mechanised infantry (one battalion); Light infantry (8 battalions); Elite parachute infantry (one battalion)
- Size: 11 battalions
- Part of: Malaysian Armed Forces
- Nickname: "Ranger"
- Mottos: Agi Idup Agi Ngelaban (Whilst there is life, there is fight or As long as I live, I shall fight!) (Iban)
- Colours: Regimentals: Red, yellow and black Beret: Rifle-green
- Anniversaries: 28 September

Commanders
- Colonel in Chief: Tuanku Syed Sirajudin Ibni Almarhum Tuanku Syed Putra Jamalullail, The Raja of Perlis

Insignia
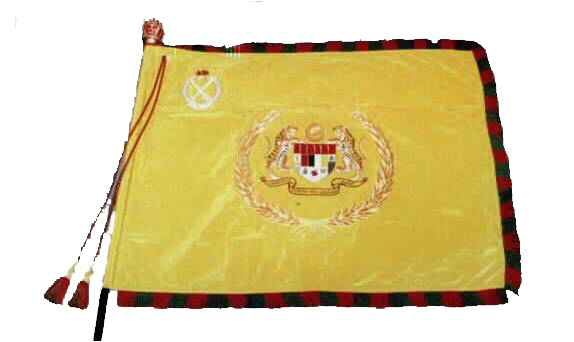
- King's Colour
- Hackle: Black

The Royal Ranger Regiment (Malay: Rejimen Renjer Diraja; RRD) is an infantry regiment of the Malaysian Army. Although it is second in seniority to the Royal Malay Regiment (Malay: Rejimen Askar Melayu Diraja; RAMD), the RRD can trace its origins back to the mid 19th century and the establishment of The Sarawak Rangers, the peacekeeping force in the Sarawak region. This force was absorbed by the Sarawak Constabulary in 1932, but the name was revived in 1941 as a British Colonial unit; this unit commanded by British lieutenant colonel C.M. Lane was captured by the Japanese in 1942.

== History ==
In 1948, at the beginning of the Malayan Emergency, groups of Iban trackers were recruited to help in the defence against the Communist Party of Malaya. These Iban trackers were organised into a regimental formation as the Sarawak Rangers in 1953. Prior to 1963, they were attached as scouts to many British units serving in Malaya. One of the trackers, Awang anak Rawang was awarded the George Cross on 20 November 1951, during his attachment to the Worcestershire Regiment.

In 1963, following the formation of Malaysia on 16 September of that year, the unit was transferred from the British Colonial Forces to the new Malaysian Army and expanded into a multi-battalion, multi-ethnic regiment named Renjer Malaysia. This became the Rejimen Renjer in 1971, before being given the 'Royal' prefix and hence known as the Rejimen Renjer Diraja ('Royal Ranger Regiment') in 1992.

On 28 September 2013, Royal Ranger Regiment celebrated its Golden Jubilee.

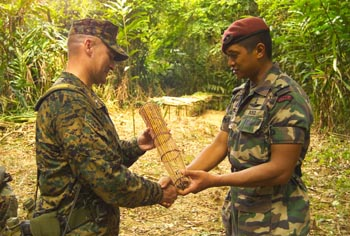
As a gesture of friendship, an officer form 8th Battalion (Parachute), Royal Ranger Regiment presents a hand-made fish trap to U.S. Marines Lt. Col. T. Armstrong, commanding officer, Landing Force, exercise Cooperation Afloat Readiness And Training (LF CARAT).

== Present ==
The RRD is organised in the same way as the RAMD and currently consists of ten battalions. The 1st to 6th, and the 9th and 10th are light infantry battalions. In 1995, the 11th Rangers was dissolved due to the restructuring of the armed forces by year 2000.

The 7th Ranger Battalion is a mechanised infantry battalion and is equipped with tracked ACV 300 Adnan IFVs, some of which are armed with Bushmaster 25 mm guns.

The 8th Ranger Battalion (Parachute) is one of the four airborne infantry battalions of the 10th Parachute Brigade – the military element in Malaysian Rapid Deployment Force.

== Colonel in Chief ==
Tuanku Syed Sirajudin Ibni Almarhum Tuanku Syed Putra Jamalullail, the former king of Malaysia (Malay: Yang Di-Pertuan Agong), and the reigning Raja of Perlis, is the colonel in chief of the regiment.

The current chairman of the corps is Lieutenant General Dato' Mohd Zaki bin Hj. Mokhtar.

== Customs and traditions ==
=== Hackle ===
Rejimen Renjer DiRaja is the only regiment or corps in the Malaysian Army that is authorised to wear the black hackle as part of their uniform. Also, unlike other units, the No.3 uniform (office duty) has black buttons and Gun Metal pips instead of the standard green buttons and pips of the Malaysian Army.

=== A Ranger – A Special Malaysian Soldier ===
Unlike in other units of the Malaysian Army, a private-rank soldier in the Rangers battalion is addressed as 'Ranger.' In the Grup Gerak Khas, a commando formation, a private is addressed as Trooper as well as in the Royal Armoured Corps. In the Royal Engineers Regiment, a private is known as Sapper, while in the Royal Artillery Regiments a private is addressed as Gunner. For the rest of the Malaysian Army, a private-rank soldier is addressed as Private.

=== Motto ===
The motto of the Ranger Regiment is Agi Idup Agi Ngelaban. A direct translation, word for word from Iban to English is "Still Alive, Still Fight." In spirit the motto means "Fight to the Death." It is conjectured that the motto was derived from Brooke family's Latin motto, Dum Spiro Spero which means "While I Breathe, I Hope." In this light, Agi Idup Agi Ngelaban could mean "While I Breathe, I fight." Dum Spiro Spero was the state motto for the Kingdom of Sarawak. In the other, according to the Journal of 1st Ranger Regiment, the motto Agi Idup Agi Ngelaban was derived from "Whilst There Is Life, There Is Fight", also noted as Brooke's family motto.

Others attributed the motto to that of Libau, also known as Rentap (means Shaker of the world), the legendary Iban Headhunter of Brooke era. Rentap's battle cry was "Agi Idup, Agi Ngelaban!" which means "I will fight as long as I will live". The Royal Ranger Regiment is the only corps of the Malaysian Armed Forces using this motto in the Iban language.

=== Sarawak Dayak, Pribumi influence & achievement ===
As an infantry regiment whose recruits are drawn from every race and pribumi (native) group of Malaysia, Rejimen Renjer Malaysia is rich with cultural heritage. The "Ngajat", the Iban Warrior Dance of the Sarawak Dayak community is now part of the regimental drill used to welcome visiting dignitaries. The adoption of this warrior dance as part of the regimental culture is due to the fact that this reincarnated unit of the Sarawak Rangers was once almost exclusively filled in the ranks by soldiers hailing from the Iban ethnicity in the state of Sarawak, majority Christian.

Col. (R) Dunstan Nyaring Angking of 1 Renjer was the first native Iban officer to attain the rank of full colonel in the Malaysian army. He served with 1 Renjer during the Indonesian confrontation and was the ensign that received on behalf of his battalion, the battalion's Truncheon. The Truncheon was presented by the first post-independence Governor of Sarawak, Tun Abang Haji Openg Bin Abang Sapi'ee on 19 November 1966 in Lundu, First Division, Sarawak. In his address to the battalion, he had this to say amongst other things:

"This TRUNCHEON which is presented to you is an emblem from the State Government. It is also a mark of appreciation of the Government and the people of Sarawak for your services to the country and for the worthy upholding of the best tradition of our people. This a great honour earned through your conduct, bearing and bravery in battle every-where you are called upon to serve".

Currently, Brigadier General Datuk Stephen Mundaw from Pakit, Sri Aman, Sarawak, is the only known highest native Iban officer serving the Malaysian Army as a brigadier general. On 1 November 2010, he became the first native Iban officer to be appointed as brigadier general. Apart from that, another known Dayak officer is Lt. Col. Jimbai Bunsu PBK, currently a 2nd I/C of the 1st Bn/511th Regiment TA based in Kuching.

The other well-known native Iban officers are Lt. Col. (R) Robert Rizal Abdullah @ Robert Madang PGB PBK from Lachau, Sri Aman and Lt. Col.(R) James Tomlow ak Isa and Lt. Col. (R) Linus Lunsong Janti, who later became first Iban to command 22nd Commando Regiment.

A known Malay officer from Sarawak to have commanded the Ranger regiment as commanding officer, were Lt. Col (R) Abang Hamdan Bin Abang Hadari and Lt Col (R) Abang Mohd Ali Badren Bin Abang Willie (9 RRD). Another Sarawakian Malay officer, Capt. (R) Ahmad Johan, later became well known businessman and now known as Tan Sri Ahmad Johan, Chairman of National Aerospace and Defense Industries Sdn.Bhd (NADI).

== Battalions of The Royal Malaysian Rangers ==
=== 1st Rangers ===
Following the terms of the Defence Agreement, Britain had agreed to raise, train and maintain one infantry battalion, each from the new states of Sabah and Sarawak. HQ Malaya Command Ranger Group was formed and headed by Colonel I.G. Wellstead to co-ordinate and implement this clause of the agreement.

The First Battalion Malaysian Rangers was formed on Malaysia Day, 16 September 1963 at Baird Camp, Ulu Tiram, Johor – the same camp occupied by the Sarawak Rangers, disbanded the day before, 15 September. Lt. Col E. Gopsill OBE, DSO, MC of the 7th Gurkha Rifles was appointed the commanding officer and the new battalion of around 100, all formerly servicemen of the Sarawak Rangers, was under the overall command of the Malaysian Army. Amongst the personnel that would be a part of the new regiment was Lt. James Tomlow ak Isa, who was originally granted a Governor's Commission in the Sarawak Rangers and was subsequently granted a regular commission as an army officer by HM the king of Malaysia, Syed Putra of Perlis.

In October 1963, the nucleus of the battalion moved out of Baird Camp to Kandy Lines, Trg Depot BDE of Gurkhas at Sungai Petani to prepare and conduct recruit training and continuity training for the new intakes. The recruits went through about four months of basic individual training followed by another two months continuity training.

Initially, this British Colonial battalion was almost exclusively composed of Sea Dayak soldiers, veterans of the Sarawak Rangers and a small number of Malay and Indian officers.

The 1st Battalion is the premier battalion and remains the icon of the Royal Ranger Regiment. Prior to the formation of Malaysia in 1963, the Sarawak Rangers gained their fearsome reputation during the Malayan Emergency. Concurrently, during the post-colonial reconstruction era, the 1st Battalion fought on extensively against the Communist Party of Malaya (CPM), Clandestine Communist Organization (CCO) the military arm of the Sarawak United People's Party (SUPP) and its affiliate the Pasukan Rakyat Kalimantan Utara (PARAKU, the armed wing of the North Kalimantan People's Army) and elements of the Indonesian National Armed Fprces (TNI). Accounts from captured Communist Terrorists (CTs) in the '60s and '70s suggest that other than the (British Royal Marines) commandos, the CPM feared the deployment of the 1st Battalion Royal Rangers in the immediate vicinity. The Rangers also saw action at the Malaysian-Thai border

The 1st Battalion remains an active unit of the Malaysian armed forces, although rather inexplicably, the recruitment of Iban stock has been gradually declined significantly over the last 20 years. Consequently, its racial composition is about the same as other Malaysian infantry battalions.

It is worth noting that in the 1950s and 1960s, the British SAS were taught jungle tracking by Iban soldiers. The Ibans from the jungles of Borneo are particularly suited to jungle warfare, serving as jungle trackers for many Commonwealth battalions. Surviving and living off the land are just daily routines to these jungle soldiers. During the Malayan Emergency, Iban trackers from the previous Malayan Scouts were attached to and served in several SAS units.

The 1st Rangers was previously based in Camp Ulu Tiram, Johor Bahru, Johor. It is now based in Kuala Lumpur. This was done by switching its status to 6th Rangers. This was done by transferring 100 soldiers from the 1st Rangers in Ulu Tiram to 6th Rangers in Kuala Lumpur and vice versa. 6th Rangers which was in Kuala Lumpur has now become 1st Rangers and the 1st Rangers which was in Ulu Tiram has now become 6th Rangers. Their records were also moved.

On 14 December 2020, the 1st Battalion Royal Rangers (Sarawak), the seniormost battalion, became the second Foot Guards Battalion of the regular ranks of the Malaysian Army. This status of Foot Guards makes this battalion prepared for the performance of ceremonial public duties in the federal capital city.

=== 2nd Rangers ===
The motto of this battalion is in the Coastal Kadazan dialect of the Dusun language: 'Osiou Oh Kamanang' (Who Dares Wins). This battalion is currently based in Syed Putra Camp, Ipoh, Perak. Syed Putra Camp was previously known as Sulva Lines Camp, and has been always regarded as 'Home of the Rangers'.

=== 3rd Rangers ===
The motto of this battalion is 'Follow Me'. This battalion also known as 'The Red Hackles Warrior'. The 3rd Rangers was raised at the Suvla Line Camp, Ipoh, Perak on 1 Jul 1965 with the combination of the personnel from Peninsular Malaysia, Sabah and Sarawak (3 different area/region). This battalion is currently stationed at the Oya Camp, Sibu, Sarawak. 928133 Staff Sergeant Muit bin Ahmad, once a member of this battalion, was awarded the 'Pingat Gagah Berani" for successful actions against communist guerrillas. Lt. Col.(Rtd) Robert Rizal Abdullah won his PGB when he served in this battalion. The special event of the battalion is war dance, Battalion dagger/bayonet and companies pennants which is visualise the spirit of Ranger Corps in the unique way.

=== 4th Rangers ===
This battalion is currently based in Oran Camp, Kangar, Perlis. This battalion received its Regimental Colours on 25 October 1980. Captain Mohana Chandran a/l Velayuthan (200402), an officer of this regiment was KIA during search-and-destroy operation in the Kinta Forest Reserve in Perak, Malaysia. He was posthumously awarded the Seri Pahlawan Gagah Perkasa (SP).

=== 5th Rangers ===
5th Battalion Royal Ranger Regiment was raised on 16 May 1969 at the Wardieburn Camp, Kuala Lumpur, just three days after the 13 May 1969 incident occurred. The motto of this battalion is 'Berjuang Terus Berjuang'. This battalion was conferred a royal title and received its regimental colours on 17 Oct 1981 at Wardieburn Camp by Royal Ranger Colonel in Chief, the late Tuanku Syed Putra Jamalullail ibni Almarhum Syed Hassan Jamalullail and 2nd Lt Willie Teo Siang Khim (370946) was the first colour bearer. This battalion is currently based at Camp Desa Pahlawan, Kota Bharu, Kelantan.

=== 6th Rangers ===
This battalion is currently based at Kem Ulu Tiram, 81800 ULU TIRAM, Johor.

=== 7th Rangers (Mechanised) ===
7th Renjer was formed on 10 May 1970, at Quetta Camp in Kluang, Johor with an initial batch of 202 recruits formed into 2 rifle companies. The complement was completed with the transfer of rifle companies from each of the 8th Malay, 2nd Renjer, 3rd Renjer and 4th Renjer battalions. With the transfer of these companies, 7th Renjer achieved full regimental strength. It is the only mechanised battalion. This battalion was badly bloodied in a communist guerrilla ambush on 26 March 1972 along the Biawak / Lundu road, Sarawak. In a follow-up operation they avenged their fallen comrades and extracted heavy retributions from the communist guerrillas responsible for the ambush. This battalion is currently based at Batu Lima Camp, Mentakab, Pahang. This battalion has successfully engaged the communist guerrillas in several search and destroy operations.

=== 8th Rangers (Parachute) ===
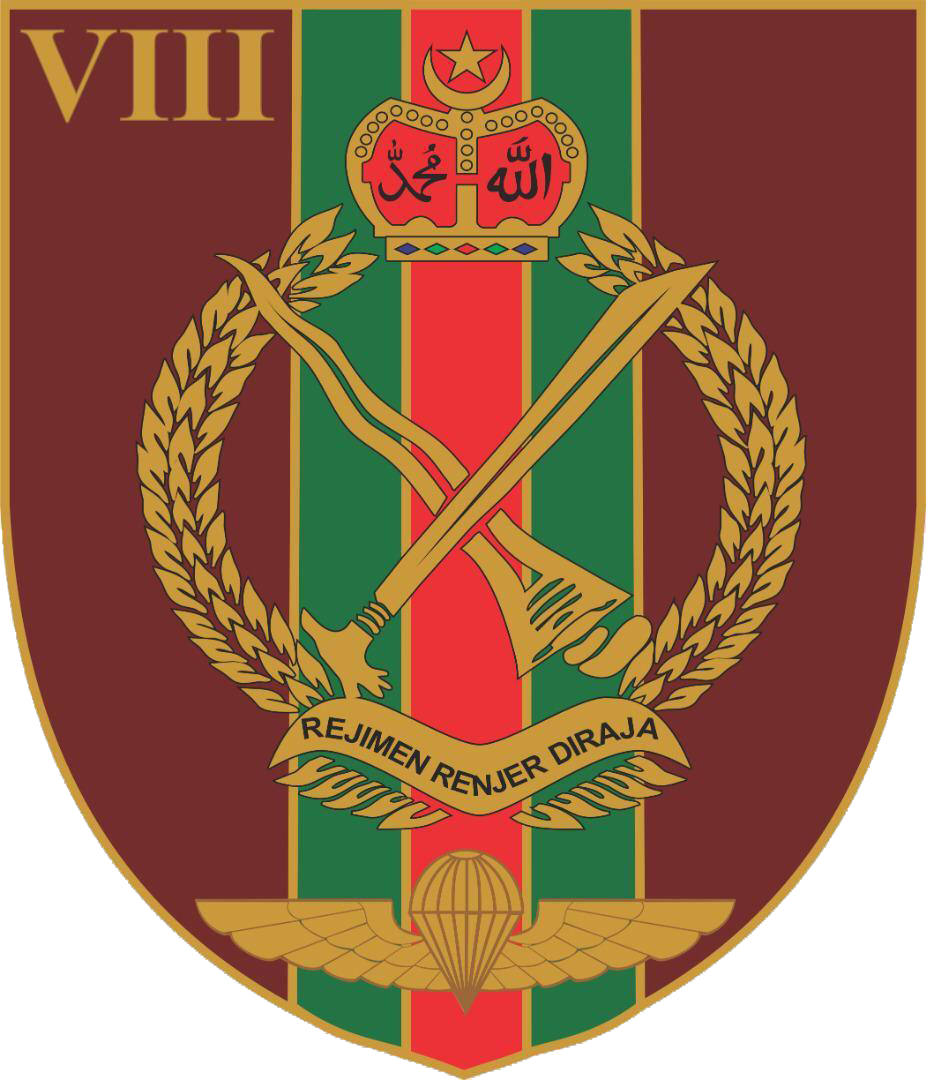
The insignia of the 8th Battalion (Parachute), Royal Ranger Regiment

8th Rangers was formed on 1 March 1973, 3 years after the formation of 7th Rangers. 8th Rangers was raised as the first parachute infantry battalion in the Malaysian Army, and achieved operational status on 1 July 1990 as a component of the elite 10 Paratroop Brigade (Malaysia).

8th Rangers gained fame during the communist Insurgency in the 1970s and 1980s. 8th Rangers engaged in several search and destroy missions against Communist Terrorists in Sarawak. From 1977, the battalion was particularly successful against Communist Terrorists in search and destroy missions in the Hulu Perak, Kinta and Kuala Kangsar regions in Perak.

Several members of the battalion were awarded the nation's highest gallantry award, the Seri Pahlawan Gagah Perkasa (SP) and the Panglima Gagah Berani (PGB) medals. Pegawai Waran II (2nd Warrant Officer) Kanang anak Langkau remains to this day the only recipient of both the Seri Pahlawan Gagah Perkasa and the Panglima Gagah Berani medals. Sergeants Michael Riman anak Bugat and Beliang anak Bali were both awarded the Panglima Gagah Berani medal.

=== 9th Rangers ===
The 9th Battalion of the Ranger Regiment originated from the 14th Malaysian Territorial Army Battalion, which was formed on 1 April 1971 in Tawau, Sabah. The members of this battalion were locals who were members of the Local Defence Force. The unit was raised at the request of the Sabah State Government who insisted that the unit must be exclusively Sabahans. The Malaysian Army gladly complied with this opportunity by converting the 14th Territorial Battalion into a regular unit in the form of 9th Rangers on 1 March 1979, at the Batu Uban Camp in Penang. The motto of this new Ranger battalion is "Sian Bani Manang", which in the Bajau language means "Who Dares Wins".

This battalion is currently based in Taiping, Perak; and on 28 September 2013, the Golden Jubilee of the Royal Ranger Regiment, the battalion was officially presented with their own color.

=== 10th Rangers ===
The 10th Battalion was officially formed on New Year's Day 1980, however the battalion nucleus was only formed on 1 April 1980 at Wade Wing, KEMENTAH (Malay for MINDEF;Ministry of Defense). Upon the formation, it was based twice at Sarawak and once at Peninsula, and their bases are:

- Camp Tasik Emas, Bau, Sarawak (April 1980 – October 1991)
- Syed Putra Camp, Ipoh, Perak (formerly known as Sulva Lines Camp; January 1988 – October 1991)
- Camp Oya, Sibu, Sarawak (November 1991 – July 1995)
- Muara Tuang Camp, Kuching, Sarawak (present)

In 1995, the 10th Rangers was dissolved with the 11th Rangers due to the restructuring of the Armed Forces by year 2000. However, in 2008, the 10th Rangers was reinstated and re-stationed at Sarawak. Currently, it is based at Muara Tuang Camp Complex, Kota Samarahan; its commanding officer is Lt.Colonel Jamaluddin Bin Yaacob; and PW 1 Michal anak Tulih is regimental sergeant major. Previously, it was based at Ria Camp, Kuching, shortly after the reinstatement of the 10th Rangers.

=== 11th Rangers ===
Under 5th Division in the wake of 2013 Lahad Datu standoff.

== Rangers in combat ==
6th Rangers-Ambush at Klian Intan

On 27 August 1970, troops of the 6th Battalion conducted a successful ambush of communist insurgents near Tanah Hitam, Klian Intan in Perak. They killed five Communist insurgents, including a branch committee member, and some weapons. Major Ismail Bin Salleh, commanding officer of Charlie Company, and Second Lieutenant David Fu Chee Ming, platoon commander of 8 Platoon, were awarded the Panglima Gagah Berani on 2 June 1971.

Based on information gathered by the Special Branch that 60 Communist insurgents would be infiltrating Tanah Hitam moving on to Grik, Charlie Company, with a complement of three officers and 94 other ranks, was given the mission of preparing an ambush along the infiltration route. Charlie Company split into three groups: Company Headquarters and 9th Platoon formed the centre blocking force, with 7th Platoon to their right and 8th Platoon to their left. The groups were given two days to prepare their ambush positions and lay booby traps and Claymore mines.

On 20 August, 1st Section consisting of eight personnel heard the rustling of branches and bamboo being snapped by footfalls. 1st Section immediately stood to in their bunkers. Ranger Abu Bin Mat saw an insurgent on the trail, 35 meters from section's position, a lead scout of a larger group. Ranger Abu Bin Mat and Ranger Abu Samah Bin Hj. Ibrahim, who were manning the Section's support GPMG, along with Lance Corporal Abdullah Bin Nawi held their fire and continued their wait. Moments later, another insurgent appeared on the trail, and then two more appeared.

At 3:45 pm, Lance Corporal Abdullah detonated his Claymore mine as the GPMG crew opened fire, joined by the LMG manned by Lance Corporal Karim Bin Sidek manning the left bunker. At 4:20 pm, the insurgents ceased fire, even though movement could still be heard in the trail. 1st Section opened fire to suppress the insurgents' movements. With nightfall, the communists made an attempt to retrieve their fallen comrades. Major Ismail called for close in artillery support on the trail, walking the artillery rounds close to 1st Section's position. The insurgents withdrew before morning, leaving behind their dead. Search the following morning revealed five dead insurgents.

Other accounts of rangers in combat are as follows:

* Operation Ngayau

* Contact with 10th Regiment CPM

* Ambush on the road Gubir / Nong Gajah

* Bagging 5 CT's at the Korbu Forest Reserve in Perak

* Operations Selamat Sawadee 1

* Operation Jelaku, Sadong, Sarawak

* Firefight at Sebatu Road, Bau, Sarawak

* Attack On Enemy Camp

* Assault At Muara Tebas

* An Ambush in Sungei Katibas

* Operation Indera

* Operation Indera IV

* Ngelaban (Fighting in Iban) Platoon in Combat

* A Firefight At Tanjung Kunyit

* Operation Seladang

* Fighting the TNI

* Firefight at Tanah Hitam

* 2013 Lahad Datu standoff
