= Pingat Perkhidmatan Setia =

Pingat Pentadbiran Setia Sarawak Sarawak Loyal Service Medal
- Type: Medal
- Awarded for: Loyal and Faithful service to the State Government for 20 continuous years or 25 accumulated years
- Presented by: The State Government of Sarawak
- Eligibility: Malaysians
- Status: Currently constituted
- Established: 1940s

Highlights
- Total recipients: Unlimited

The Pingat Perkhidmatan Setia (Loyal Service Medal or Loyalty Service Medal) is a medal awarded by the Sarawak State Government as a token of gratitude towards a Civil Service Personnel who has served for 20 continuous or 25 accumulated years of service.

The medal is usually presented by the Chief Minister of Sarawak, with Sarawak State Secretary present as well. Should the Chief Minister be unable to attend the presentation ceremony, the Deputy Chief Minister will present the medal instead.

== History ==
The history of the medal began during the days of the Brooke era, when it was known as the 'Long Service Decoration' medal, in recognition of exceptional, loyal, and long service by Sarawakians in Government Service.

After the cession of Sarawak to Britain in 1946, the medal was renamed as 'Long Service Badge'; however the purpose of the presentation of the badge remained the same. In 1963, after the independence of Sarawak within the formation of Malaysia, the badge was renamed as the 'Long Service Medal' or 'Pingat Perkhidmatan Lama'.

Again, on 24 May 1996, the medal's name was changed again to the 'Pingat Perkhidmatan Setia', in accordance of Surat Pekeliling (Bil.Perj.19/96), dated 24 May 1996. In 2008, the ribbon medal was introduced for female recipients.

In 2010, Royal Malaysian Police (Polis Diraja Malaysia) personnels became eligible to receive the medal for the first time.
