= Grand Knight of Valour =

Highest federal award in Malaysia

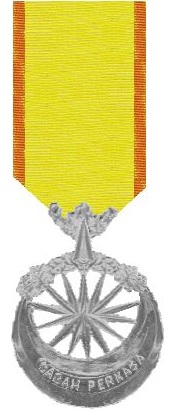
- image of the decoration

Awarded by The Sovereign of Malaysia
- Type: State Order
- Established: 29 July 1960
- Ribbon: Yellow with red edges.
- Eligibility: Malaysian citizens
- Awarded for: Supreme gallantry in extraordinary and highly dangerous situations.
- Status: Currently constituted
- Sovereign: Sultan Ibrahim, King of Malaysia
- Grades: Grand Recipient
- Post-nominals: S.P.

Statistics
- First induction: 1963
- Last induction: 2014
- Total inductees: 29

Precedence
- Next (higher): None
- Next (lower): Order of the Royal Family of Malaysia
- Ribbon bar of the Honour

The Grand Knight of Valour (Malay: Darjah Kebesaran Seri Pahlawan Gagah Perkasa) is the highest federal gallantry award of Malaysia, conferred for supreme courage and bravery in extraordinary and highly dangerous situations. It was created on 29 July 1960 and was gazetted on 11 August 1960. The award is the highest ranking in the list of the Malaysian Federal Ranking of Awards, and is ranked higher than the Order of the Royal Family of Malaysia (D.K.M.) awarded to Malaysian Royalty.

== Criteria ==
The Grand Knight of Valour is awarded to those who have shown, "supreme courage and bravery in extraordinary and highly dangerous situations". The number of awards is not limited, and may be conferred to any eligible person, both civilian and military.

== Entitlements ==
The Grand Knight of Valour, as the highest Armed Forces Gallantry Award, is the highest in the order of precedence in the awards and decorations of the Malaysian Armed Forces. It is also the highest award of the Malaysian Federal Awards, outranking the awards which carry the title of Datuk, Tan Sri, or Tun.

The award does not carry any title and is not listed in the Federal Order of Precedence. Since 1990, the award does carry a monetary stipend. With the passage of the Seri Pahlawan Gagah Perkasa (Remembrance Allowance) Act 1990, recipients and their families are entitled to a monetary allowance.

Living recipients of the decoration are paid an allowance of RM 400 per month. Those who had received the award prior to the passage of the act, were paid retroactively to the date of their award, but not any earlier than June 1983. The allowance ends upon the death of the recipient. A posthumous recipient's next of kin receives a lump-sum payment of RM 20,000.

== Appearance ==
The medal pendant is made of silver. It is a crescent moon with the inscription Gagah Perkasa. Within the arc of the moon is a fourteen-pointed star. An intricately designed clasp attaches the pendant to the ribbon. The medal's ribbon is royal yellow 1.5 inches wide with red stripes 1/8 inches wide.

== Recipients ==
Official source

=== S.P. ===
Recipients do not receive any title.

#	Name	Rank at that time	Year	Uniformed services	Unit at that time	Notes
1	Veloo s/o Rajavelu	Special Constable	1963	Royal Malaysia Police		The first recipient of Seri Pahlawan Gagah Perkasa. Honoured for bravery and community service, laying down his life in combating piracy in Klang in August 1962.
2	Abu Bakar bin Ngah Wahab	Constable	1969	Royal Malaysia Police	Police Field Force	Killed in action in Betong, South Thailand on 15 August 1968.
3	Abdul Razak bin Hussain d/a Husain bin Salleh	Second Lieutenant	1971	Malaysian Army	8th Battalion Ranger Regiment	Killed in action in Sendiawan, Sarawak, 1970.
4	Fong Thean Kit	Constable	1971	Royal Malaysia Police		Caught a notorious criminal that killed Cpl Yeap Sean Hua in Setapak, Kuala Lumpur on 30 April 1971. Constable Fong was recognised for bravery in arresting an armed man on the wanted list. Despite the gunman killing his colleague and wounding Constable Fong, he managed to capture the dangerous suspect.
5	Gean Kartar Singh a/k Kean Singh	Inspector	1971	Malaysian Prison Department	Penang Prison	Prevented a break-out at Penang prison in 1970.
6	Lenggu anak China	Warrant Officer II	1971	Malaysian Army	1st Battalion Ranger Regiment	Killed in action in an ambush by communist terrorist in Tanjong Babi Batu, Song, Sarawak on 20 January 1971. Even though the enemy outnumbered the Security Forces, and having managed to destroy the forward boat, the fighting spirit of Warrant Officer 2 Lenggu anak China was not affected. In fact, it had the opposite effect. With determination and a very high spirit, in the highest traditions of the Ranger Corps, he launched a determined assault single-handedly against the enemy. He managed to kill 4 of the enemy. In this action, Warrant Officer 2 Lenggu anak China fell beside the enemies he had killed.
7	Yeap Sean Hua	Corporal	1971	Royal Malaysia Police		Killed by armed criminal during a crime prevention round in Setapak, Kuala Lumpur on 30 April 1971.
8	Etin a/k Bijam	Constable	1972	Royal Malaysia Police	Police Field Force	Battled against Communist terrorist in Sibu, Sarawak on 29 April 1972.
9	Mohanachandran s/o Velayuthan	Captain	1972	Malaysian Army	4th Battalion Ranger Regiment	Killed in action in Ulu Kinta, Perak, 1971.
10	Ngalinuh Bala @ Kilah Atu	Corporal	1972	Royal Malaysia Police	Police Field Force	Battled against communist terrorist in Sibu, Sarawak on 29 April 1972. While escorting explosives along Jalan Ulu Oya, Mubal, Sarawak with four of his men, Ngalinuh and his men were attacked by terrorists. Fighting back, Ngalinuh managed to injure and capture one of his attackers while driving the rest away, Ngalinuh sustained a near fatal knife wound to the chest in hand to hand armed combat, and survived.
11	Rasli bin Buang	Trooper	1972	Malaysian Army	1st Malaysian Special Service Regiment	Killed in action in Chemor, Perak on 6 July 1971.
12	Syed Mohd Mokhtar bin Syed Zubir Barakhbah	Inspector	1972	Royal Malaysia Police	Police Field Force	Ambushed by communist terrorist at Malaysia – Thailand border on 11 August 1971. On 11 August 1971, Mokhtar was leading four of his men on a patrol along the Malaysia-Thai border. Mokhtar was the only survivor of the attack and had managed to kill one of the attackers.
13	Hamid bin Awang	Captain	1973	Malaysian Army	2nd Battalion Ranger Regiment	Ops Marcup 1 in Lundu, Sarawak, 7 April 1973. Based on intelligence gathered indicating that a force of 40 to 50 communist terrorist would converge on Gunung Pueh, "D” Company of 2 Royal Malay Regiment led by Captain Hamid was tasked in a search and destroy mission. On 7 April 1973, Captain Hamid and his company detected a Communist encampment. Captain Hamid organised his company for an assault on the camp. Captain Hamid fired an M79 grenade round to mark the start of the attack and rush into the Communist Terrorist camp. In the heat of battle, a communist terrorist tried to shoot down one of Captain Hamid's men. Captain Hamid immediately rushed to the terrorist and hit the terrorist in the neck with the M79 grenade launcher. Captain Hamid's company scored 3 kills and captured 3 enemy weapons, as well as ammunition and assorted equipment. Captain Hamid's company suffered 1 KIA. Captain Hamid was awarded the SP on 6 June 1973.
14	Chin Chin Kooi	Chief Inspector	1973	Royal Malaysia Police	Special Branch	Killed in action when a notorious criminal broke in his house on 12 July 1972. On that day at 9:00 p.m. treacherous enemies had gate-crashed a residence. C/Insp Chin was shot point blank range by two pistols. Before breathing his last breath, he was still courageous enough to return fire at the enemies. The late C/Insp Chin had served in the police force for 21 years.
15	Reggie anak Deli	Inspector	1973	Royal Malaysia Police	Police Field Force	Killed 6 communist terrorist during a battle in Bintulu, Sarawak, 10 April 1973. While leading a 6-man Police Field Force on 10 April 1973, his unit tracked down and confronted 14 communists travelling in a boat along Sungai Kemena in Sebauh, Bintulu. In the ensuing 20-minute gun battle, despite being outnumbered, Reggie and his men killed six of the insurgents, captured the rest, and seized seven shotguns, 13 bullets, medical supplies and important documents belonging to the insurgents. Reggie joined the police force in 1961, and retired following a stroke in 1986.
16	Abdul Hamid bin Ismail	Second Lieutenant	1975	Malaysian Army	3rd Battalion Royal Malay Regiment	Killed in action during operation in Baling, Kedah on 8 September 1973.
17	Othman bin Ahmad	Detective Constable	1975	Royal Malaysia Police	Criminal Investigation Department	Ambushed by 6 wanted criminal in Chuping, Perlis on 10 January 1974. He managed to kill one of them.
18	Nuing Saling	Constable	1976	Royal Malaysia Police	Police Field Force	Killed in action during a battle with communist terrorist near Sungai Setabau, Sibu, Sarawak on 6 April 1975.
19	Zainal Abidin bin Abdul Rashid	Acting Major	1977	Malaysian Army	17th Battalion Royal Malay Regiment	Killed in action at Ops Gubir II, 1976.
20	Kanang anak Langkau	Sergeant	1981	Malaysian Army	8th Battalion Ranger Regiment	He was the only recipient of both Seri Pahlawan Gagah Perkasa and Pingat Gagah Berani. Following the death of a soldier in the Tanah Hitam area of Perak in an engagement with communists on 8 February 1980, the Unit Combat Intelligence Squad (UCIS) of 8th Battalion Royal Rangers under the leadership of Sergeant Kanang anak Langkau was tasked to seek and destroy the group. They tracked the enemy over difficult terrain for 11 days. On 19 February 1980, at around 1500 hours, his platoon managed to estimate the location of the enemy, who were close by. Kanang's group was mistaken as they were already within the enemy's perimeter, which they realised when they found a communications cord connecting the sentry outpost to the main force. Kanang, 8 metres from the enemy sentry position, launched an attack to his right flank. It then became apparent that the main force lay to the left. They assaulted the left and routed the enemy taking one casualty and killing five communists. One soldier was seriously wounded and Kanang himself took three rounds but survived and eventually returned to active duty retiring as a Warrant Officer 1. Kanang anak Langkau was conferred the "Seri Pahlawan Gagah Perkasa" for valour in decimating the enemy on 3 June 1981.
21	Saimon Tarikat	Lance Corporal	1983	Malaysian Army	Combat Intelligence Unit	Killed in action in Kuala Klawang, Negeri Sembilan, 1983.
22	Paul Kiong	Inspector	1983	Royal Malaysia Police	Special Branch	Inspector with Police Special Branch in Ipoh, part of several operations to cripple communist terrorist between 1966 and 1989. This involved infiltrating the organisation, operating in the jungle, capturing the terrorists alive as well as being involved in direct confrontations with them. He was conferred the SP on 1 June 1983. He retired as a Superintendent of Police in 1998.
23	Sia Boon Chee	Inspector	1983	Royal Malaysia Police	Special Branch	Inspector with Special Branch in Ipoh - part of several operations to cripple communist terrorist between 1966 and 1989. These operations required him to gather intelligence by infiltrating enemy lines, operating in thick jungle, capturing terrorists alive and engaging them in direct battle. He was awarded the SP on 1 June 1983. He retired with the rank of DSP in 1994. He read law the following year and is currently a practising lawyer.
24	Abdul Jalil bin Ibrahim		1985	~	Civilians	Murdered in Hong Kong, 1983 while investigating the BMF scandal, the only civilian to receive the award to this date. A former student of the Royal Military College, Jalil was an assistant general manager for Bumiputra Finance Berhad. He was killed in Hong Kong in July 1983 while investigating a case involving the fraudulent award of RM2.5 billion (then) in loans by Bumiputra Finance Berhad to the Carrian Group helmed by Malaysian businessman, George Tan. The case received wide coverage as several Malaysian politicians were involved. The Carrian Group's spectacular collapse the same year was also to become Hong Kong's largest bankruptcy.
25	Mat Aznan bin Awang	Corporal	1994	Malaysian Army	Malaysian Battalion in Mogadishu, Somalia	Killed in action. While serving with the United Nations UNOSOM II force in Somalia, Corporal Mat Aznan was killed in action during the Battle of Mogadishu.
26	Nasaruddin bin Che Yeop	Corporal	1998	Royal Malaysia Police	Federal Reserve Unit	Killed during riot by illegal immigrants at Semenyih Detention Centre on 26 March 1998.
27	Abdul Razak bin Mohd Yusof	Assistant Superintendent of Police	2001	Royal Malaysia Police	VAT 69 Commando	Sauk siege, 6 July 2000.
28	Zaini bin Mohd Said	Lieutenant General	2001	Malaysian Army	21st Special Service Group	Sauk siege, 6 July 2000.
29	Mohd Zabri bin Abdul Hamid	Assistant Superintendent of Police	2014	Royal Malaysia Police	VAT 69 Commando	Inspector of Task Force (VAT 69) - killed in action in Grik, Perak in 1975. Killed when he stepped on a booby-trap which was set up by a communist while taking two wounded members to an extraction point area after an operation of hunting down the communist who killed extra policemen who were sent to the hospital. His right leg was broken and suffered serious wounds which made him lose much blood. He was posthumously promoted to ASP for his bravery.
