= Sarawak Rangers =

Paramilitary force in Sarawak

Sarawak Rangers badge

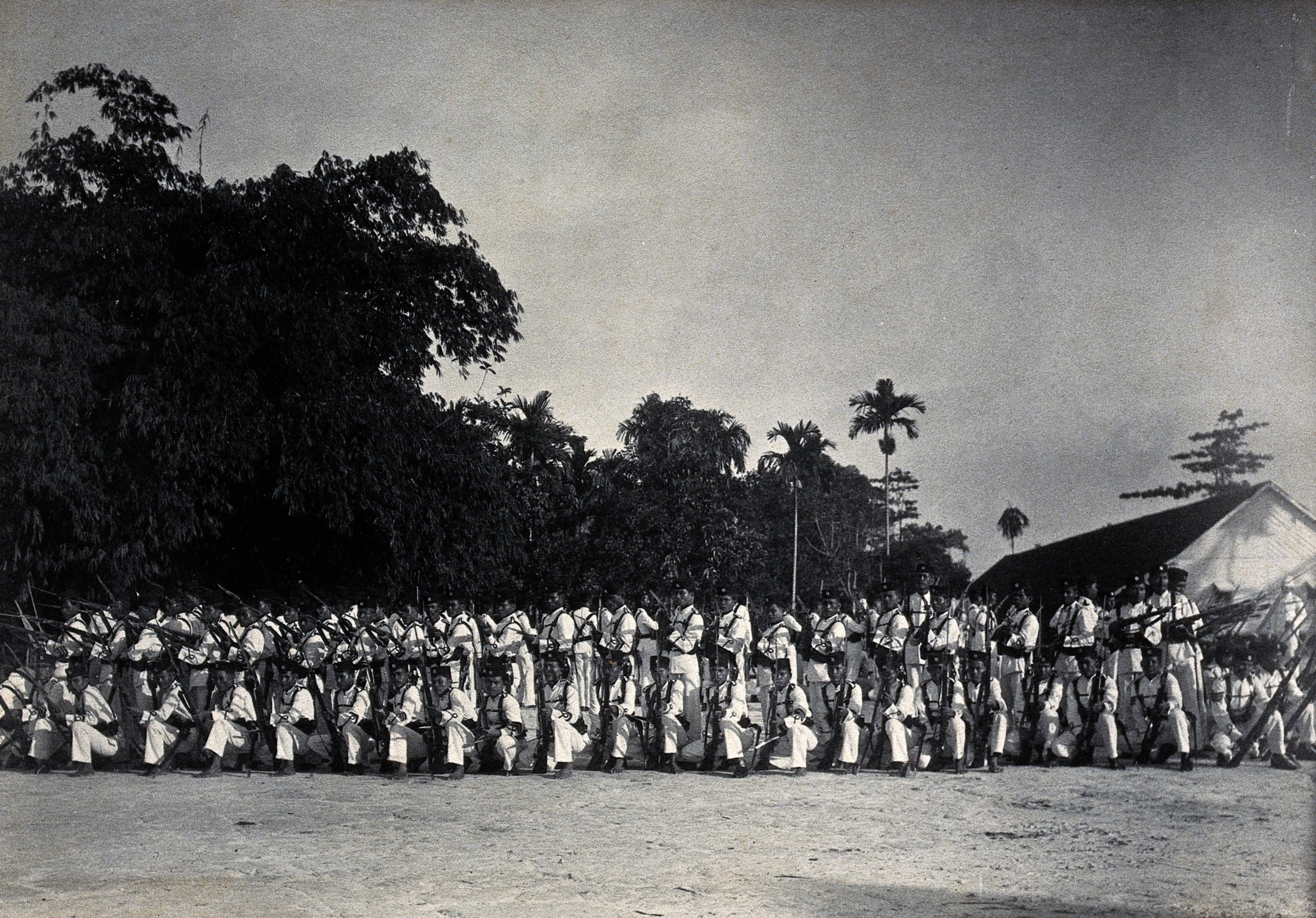
A line-up of armed Sarawak Rangers.

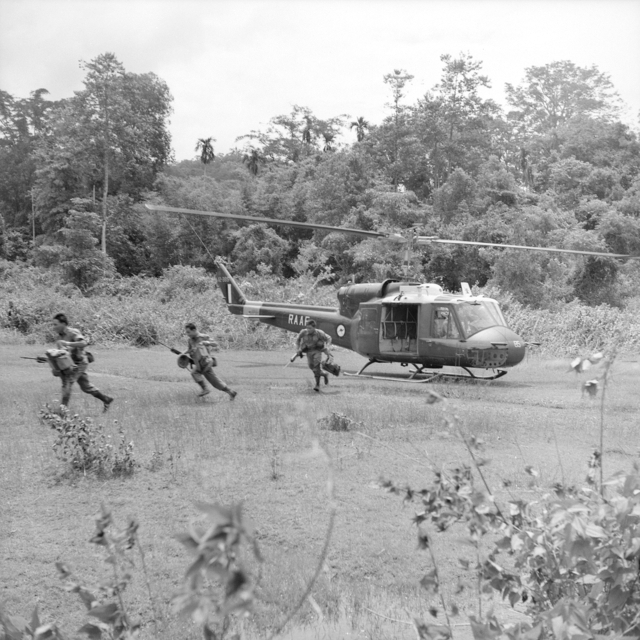
Sarawak Rangers comprising Ibans leap from a Royal Australian Air Force Bell UH-1 Iroquois helicopter to guard the Malay–Thai border from potential Communist attacks in 1965, two years before the Second Malayan Emergency starting in 1968.

The Sarawak Rangers, later the Sarawak Constabulary were a paramilitary force founded in 1862 by the second White Rajah of the Raj of Sarawak, Charles Brooke.

== History ==
Sarawak rangers evolved from the fortmen which were raised to defend Kuching in 1846.

The Sarawak Rangers were first commanded by William Henry Rodway, from 1862 until 1870 where Major F.A. Walter, a retired officer from 97th foot, succeeded him. Rodway assumed control again on Sarawak Rangers from 1872 to his retirement in 1881, and were highly skilled in jungle warfare and general policing duties, being equipped with various western rifles, cannons and native weaponry.

They were based in a number of forts constructed at strategic locations in towns and at river mouths. Aside from protecting Sarawak's borders, they were used to fight any rebels and were engaged in a number of campaigns during their history. In times of emergency or war, they could depend on the support of the local population and tribespeople.

The Sarawak Rangers were disbanded for a few years until 1932, only to be reformed as Sarawak Constabulary and mobilised for the Second World War in which they attempted to defend Sarawak from Japanese invasion in 1942 at the start of the Pacific War. After the abdication of Charles Vyner Brooke in 1946 and the creation of the Crown Colony of Sarawak, the Sarawak Rangers became a colonial unit under direct British control and saw action in both the Malayan Emergency and the Borneo Confrontation.

In 1963, upon the formation of Malaysia, the Sarawak Rangers were transformed into the 1st Battalion, Royal Ranger Regiment.

== See also ==
- Raj of Sarawak
