= List of people from Wolverhampton =

Notable people from Wolverhampton, England

This is a list of people born in or associated with the city of Wolverhampton in England.

== A ==
- Antonio Aakeel (born ca.1985) – English actor
- Sir James Adams (1932–2020) – diplomat; ambassador to Egypt and Tunisia
- Jack Addenbrooke (1865–1922) – football player and manager; his 37-year term as manager of Wolves remains the longest in club history
- George Africanus (c. 1763–1834) – baptised George John Scipio Africanus; West African former slave; became a successful entrepreneur in Nottingham
- Aisha (born 1962) – real name Pamela Ross, roots reggae singer
- Reg Allen (1917–1989) – Academy Award-nominated set decorator
- Frederick W. Allsopp (1867–1946) – newspaperman, author, book collector, co-founder of bookshop; eponym of Allsopp Park, Little Rock, Arkansas
- George Armstrong (1822–1901) – locomotive superintendent, Northern Division, Great Western Railway, 1864–1897
- Joseph Armstrong (1816–1877) – locomotive superintendent, Northern Division, Great Western Railway, 1854–1864
- Rod Arnold (born 1952) – football goalkeeper, spent the most of his career at Mansfield Town; with 513 first-team appearances (440 in the league), he is the holder of the club's all-time appearance record.
- Arthur Arrowsmith (1880–1954) – footballer, inside right
- Lindsay Ashford (born 1959) – crime novelist; first woman to graduate from both Queens' College, Cambridge and Cambridge University's Institute of Criminology
- Tom Aspaul (born ca.1980) – singer/songwriter and producer
- Bill Asprey (born 1936) – footballer (defender) and coach
- Len Astill (1916–1990) – footballer, left wing
- Rebecca Atkinson-Lord (born ca.1985) – theatre director and writer
- Richard Attwood (born 1940) – winner of 1970 24 Hours of Le Mans; former Formula One driver

== B ==
- Keedie Babb (born 1982) – classical crossover soprano
- Babylon Zoo (formed in 1992) – British electro rock band of the mid-1990s
- Ruth Badger (born 1978) – business consultant, runner-up of the 2nd series of The Apprentice
- Diane Bailey (born 1943) – golfer; represented Great Britain and Ireland in Curtis Cup fixtures in 1962 and 1972; captained the team in 1984, 1986 and 1988
- Prof. Chris Baines (born 1947) – environmentalist, gardener, naturalist and TV presenter
- Peter Baker (born 1967) – golfer
- Jack Bannister (1930–2016) – cricketer and commentator
- Frances Barber (born 1958) – actress
- Steve Barnett (born 1952) – chairman and CEO of Capitol Music Group
- George Barney (1792–1862) – Royal Engineer officer who became lieutenant governor of the Colony of North Australia, son of Joseph Barney
- Joseph Barney (1753–1832) – artist and engraver
- Dr George Barnsby (1919–2010) – author and socialist scholar
- Tom Barrett (1891–1924) – motor-racing riding mechanic; his death in the 1924 San Sebastian Grand Prix ended the practice of riding mechanics in two-seat racing cars
- Al Barrow (born 1968) – bassist of the British band Magnum
- Dickie Baugh (1864–1929) – footballer, right back who spent the majority of his career with Wolverhampton Wanderers, for whom he played in three FA Cup finals
- Stuart Baxter (born 1953) – 226 caps as a footballer; current manager of South Africa national football team
- Edwin Butler Bayliss (1874–1950) – artist, known for his realistic and unsentimental paintings of industrial sites in the Black Country
- Sir William Maddock Bayliss (1860–1924) – physiologist; co-discoverer of peristalsis of the intestines and the peptide hormone secretin, the first discovered hormone
- Ann Beach (born 1938) – actress
- Miles Beevor (1900–1994) – solicitor, pilot and businessman
- Clinton Bennett (born 1955) – British American scholar of religions and participant in interfaith dialogue, specializing in the study of Islam and Muslim-non-Muslim encounter
- Nigel Bennett (born 1949) – an Anglo-Canadian actor, director and writer
- Kenneth Benton (1909–1999) – MI6 officer and diplomat 1937–68; after retirement, began a second career as writer of spy and crime thrillers
- Charles Albert Berry (1852–1899) – nonconformist divine
- Gwen Berryman (1906–1983) – played Doris Archer in the BBC radio soap opera The Archers from the first episode in 1951 until 1980
- Dick Betteley (1880–1942) – footballer, defender
- Bibio (born 1978) – professional name of British music producer Stephen Wilkinson
- William Bidlake (1861–1938) – architect; a leading figure of the Arts and Crafts movement in Birmingham; Director of the School of Architecture at Birmingham School of Art
- Edward Bird (1772–1819) – artist, early member of the Bristol School
- John Blackburn (1933–1994) – Conservative MP for Dudley West 1979–1994
- Joan Blackham (1946–2020) – actress, Bridget Jones's Diary
- Sue Blane (born 1949) – theatrical costume designer
- Billy Blunt (1886–1962) – footballer who played in the Football League for Wolverhampton Wanderers and Bristol Rovers; became the first Wolves player to score two hat-tricks during a season; twice he scored 4 in games
- George Bradburn (1894–1975) – footballer, played as a centre-half for Southampton and Walsall in the years after World War I
- Henry Brinton (1901–1977) – politician, astronomer and author of 1962 Cold War novel Purple-6
- Peter Broadbent (1933–2013) – England international footballer, midfielder; won major domestic honours with Wolverhampton Wanderers; appeared in the 1958 World Cup; scored the club's first ever goal in European competition when he netted against Schalke in a European Cup tie in November 1958
- Thomas John I'Anson Bromwich (1875–1929) – mathematician, fellow of the Royal Society
- Norman Brook (1902–1967) – Cabinet Secretary (1947–1962)
- Reverend James Brown (1812–1881) – RC bishop of Shrewsbury (1851–1881)
- Nicholas Budgen (1937–1998) – barrister and politician
- Steve Bull (born 1965) – footballer, striker; holds the club goal-scoring record for Wolves and has a stand named after him at their Molineux Stadium
- Evaline Hilda Burkitt (1876–1955) – first British suffragette to be force-fed
- Tony Butler (1935–2023) – radio presenter and self-styled inventor of the football phone-in
- Stephen Byers (born 1953) – cabinet minister and Labour Party politician

== C ==
- Bill Caddick (1944–2018) – folk singer-songwriter and guitarist, member of the group Home Service
- Eddie Chambers (born 1960) – artist, writer, curator and academic
- William Chappell (1907–1994) – dancer, ballet designer, director
- Radzi Chinyanganya (born 1986) – co-presenter of the BBC children's TV programme Blue Peter
- Ben Christophers (born 1969) – singer-songwriter and multi-instrumentalist
- Charles Chubb (1779–1845) and Jeremiah Chubb – lock and safe manufacturers
- Eddie Clamp (1934–1995) – footballer, right half, nicknamed 'Chopper Eddie'
- Wayne Clarke (born 1961) – footballer, striker
- Nick Clewley (born 1983) – cricketer
- Louis Coatalen (1879–1962) – automobile engineer
- B. L. Coombes (1893–1974) – writer, spent most of his working life in the coal mines of the South Wales coalfield, which provided the subject matter for much of his writing
- John Cooper (born 1958) – barrister specialising in human rights and criminal law; broadcaster and politician
- Leonard Cottrell (1913–1974) – author and journalist
- Ernest Frank Guelph Cox (1883–1959) – electrical and mechanical engineer; marine salvage expert
- Charlotte Craddock (born ca.1988) – field hockey player, youngest member of the British hockey squad for the 2008 Summer Olympics in Beijing
- Garry Crawford (born 1972) – sociologist whose research focuses primarily on audiences and consumer patterns, in particular, sports fans and video gamers
- Steve Cross (born 1959) – footballer, defender / midfielder; played for Shrewsbury Town, Derby County and Bristol Rovers; commentator on BBC Radio Shropshire
- Geoff Crudgington (born 1952) – footballer, goalkeeper
- Stan Cullis (1916–2001) – footballer (defender) and football manager with Wolves; namesake of a stand at their Molineux Stadium
- Ernest Geoffrey Cullwick (1859–1945) – pioneer of electromagnetism and atomic particles; director of Electrical Engineering for the Royal Canadian Navy and Director of the Electrical Research Defense Research Board of Canada

== D ==
- Claire Darke (born ca.1965) – from Stratford-upon-Avon; 161th mayor of Wolverhampton
- Paul Darke (born 1962) – leading disability rights activist and academic, husband of Claire Darke, lives in Wolverhampton
- Kevin Darley (born 1960) – jockey, British flat racing Champion Jockey in 2000 (155 wins); co-president of the Jockeys' Association of Great Britain
- Jean Margaret Davenport (1829–1903) – stage actress in England and the US
- Howard R. Davies (1895–1973) – motorcycle racing champion and motorcycle designer
- Mark Davies (born 1988) – footballer currently playing for Bolton Wanderers
- Kirk Dawes (born ca.1957) – detective constable with West Midlands Police, founded the Centre For Conflict Transformation, a company trying to reduce gun and gang violence
- Group Captain Montagu Ellis Hawkins "Monty" Dawson (1919–2003) – bombardier and navigator
- Christopher Hugh Dearnley (1930–2000) – cathedral organist, director of music, served in Salisbury Cathedral and St Paul's Cathedral
- Narinder Dhami (born 1958) – children's author
- Michael Dibdin (1947–2007) – crime writer
- Derek Dougan (1938–2007) – Northern Ireland international footballer, played for Wolverhampton Wanderers; defender / midfielder / forward; chief executive and later chairman of Wolves, as part of a consortium that saved the club from liquidation
- Rebecca Downes – blues rock singer, guitarist, songwriter and vocal coach
- Spencer Dunkley (born 1969) – basketball player, pivot; coaches in Appoquinimink High School, Odessa, Delaware
- Sheila Dunn (1940–2004) – actress

== E ==
- Catherine Eddowes (1842–1888) – victim of the Whitechapel murders attributed to Jack the Ripper
- Dean Edwards (born 1962) – footballer (forward), football manager
- Major Roland Elcock (1899–1944) – as corporal he was the recipient of the Victoria Cross, the highest and most prestigious award for gallantry in the face of the enemy that can be awarded to British and Commonwealth forces
- Verona Elder (born 1953) – British, Commonwealth and European medal-winning English 400 metres runner; manager of the British athletics team for people with learning disability
- Edward Elgar (1857–1934) – despite living in Worcester, he was an ardent Wolverhampton Wanderers fan and may have travelled to home games on his bicycle
- Billy Ellis (1895–1939) – footballer, played in the Football League for Sunderland, Birmingham, Lincoln City and York City as a winger
- Georgia Elwiss (born 1991) – international cricketer, right-arm medium fast bowler and right-handed batsman
- Simon Emmerson (born 1950) – electroacoustic music composer working mostly with live electronics
- Bernard Walter Evans (1843–1922) – landscape painter and watercolourist
- Sir Walter Evans, 1st Baronet (1872–1954) – hydraulic engineer, politician and public servant; was created a baronet of Wightwick near Wolverhampton

== F ==
- Craig Fallon (1982–2019) – judoka; second male British judoka to simultaneously hold both a World and European title
- Dr Robert William Felkin (1853–1926) – explorer, anthropologist, medical missionary, ceremonial magician, and founder of the Whare Ra lodge
- Ron Flowers (born 1934) – footballer, midfielder; member of England's victorious 1966 World Cup squad; playing at Wolves he won three league championships and an FA Cup; made 515 appearances for the club, scoring 37 times
- sisters Edith Henrietta Fowler (1865–1944) and Ellen Thorneycroft Fowler (1860–1929) – authors
- Henry Fowler, 1st Viscount Wolverhampton (1830–1911) – solicitor and politician
- Henry Fowler, 2nd Viscount Wolverhampton (1870–1943) – peer in the peerage of the United Kingdom; the title became extinct on his death, without issue
- Richard Fryer (1770–1846) – local banker, landowner and British Whig politician; MP 1832–1835, for Wolverhampton

== G ==
- Trevor Gadd (born 1952) – track cycling champion, competed at the 1976 Summer Olympics, the Commonwealth Games and World Championships
- Alan Garner (1929–1996) – British Labour party activist and trade unionist
- Rex Garner (1921–2015) – actor and director
- Arthur Gaskin (1862–1928) – illustrator, painter, teacher and designer of jewellery and enamelwork; he and his wife Georgie Gaskin were members of the Birmingham Group
- Dr Helen Geake (born 1967) – archaeologist and Anglo-Saxon specialist on archaeological television programme Time Team
- Frank Noel George (1897–1929) – footballer, goalkeeper for Wolverhampton Wanderers; made 242 senior competitive appearances for Wolves
- John Lloyd Gibbons (1837–1919) – engineering surveyor; justice of the peace; county councillor for Bilston; Liberal Unionist Party MP for Wolverhampton South, 1898–1900
- William Gibbons (1649–1728) – English physician
- Bonaventure Giffard (1642–1734) – Roman Catholic bishop; vicar apostolic of the Midland District of England, 1687–1703; vicar apostolic of the London District of England, 1703–1734
- Christopher Gill (born 1936) – family meat processing business; politician (MP) both Conservative and UKIP
- John Wayne Glover (1932–2005) – British-born Australian serial killer convicted for the murders of six elderly women on Sydney's North Shore; over a 14-month period in 1989–1990, he killed six elderly women, dubbed the "granny killer"
- Karthi Gnanasegaram (born ca.1980) – sports presenter with the BBC; formerly with Sky News, ITN and Al Jazeera's International News Channel in Doha
- Richard Green (born 1967) – footballer, defender
- Mathew Guest (born 1975) – professor of Sociology of Religion at Durham University
- Button Gwinnett (1735–1777) – apprentice ironmonger in Wolverhampton, married a greengrocer's daughter then emigrated to the USA in 1762; signatory of the US Declaration of Independence

== H ==
- Sir Geoff Hampton (born 1952) – head teacher who transformed the fortunes of the first school in Britain which had been deemed by OFSTED inspectors as "failing"
- Benjamin Hanbury (1778–1864) – English nonconformist historian
- Johnny Hancocks (1919–1994) – footballer, right wing
- Gilbert Harding (1907–1960) – journalist and radio and television personality
- Neil Harrison (born 1962) – top ranking cricket umpire based in Japan umpired four matches at the 2009 Women's Cricket World Cup
- Billy 'Artillery' Hartill (1905–1980) – footballer, forward; Wolves' top goal scorer for 45 years until the feat was broken by John Richards shortly before Hartill's death
- Jack Hayes (1887–1941) – police officer, trade unionist and politician; served in the Metropolitan Police, general secretary of the National Union of Police and Prison Officers
- Helene Hayman, Baroness Hayman (born 1949) – first Lord Speaker
- Sir Charles William Hayward (1892–1983) – entrepreneur and philanthropist
- Henry John Hayward (1865–1945) – Wolverhampton-born New Zealand theatrical company manager and cinema chain proprietor
- Sir Jack Hayward (1923–2015) – son of Wolverhampton factory owners; self-made millionaire; benefactor of many charities; fighter pilot in the Second World War; president of Wolverhampton Wanderers F.C.
- Rudall Hayward (1900–1974) – filmmaker
- Norman Heath (1924–1983) – footballer, goalkeeper
- Karl Henry (born 1982) – footballer, defensive midfielder and former Wolves captain
- Rachael Heyhoe Flint (1939–2017) – captain of the England Women's Cricket World Cup team in 1973
- Kenny Hibbitt (born 1951) – footballer, midfielder; during his time at Molineux he won 2 League Cups (1974 and 1980, scoring in the 1974 final) and played in the 1972 UEFA Cup Final; played 544 games for Wolves, scoring 114 goals, the second most appearances a player has made in Wolves history
- Benjamin Hicklin (1816–1909) – solicitor and borough magistrate; the Hicklin test is a legal test for obscenity established by the English case Regina v. Hicklin
- Sir Alfred Hickman, 1st Baronet (1830–1910) – industrialist and Conservative MP 1885–1906
- Barbara Hicks (1924–2013) – actress
- James Higginson (1885–1940) – cricketer who played one first-class game, scored no runs in his only innings (but maintained an infinite batting average on account of remaining not out), and took no wickets or catches
- Alexander Staveley Hill (1825–1905) – barrister and KC, politician (MP); eponym of Stavely, Alberta
- Dave Hill (born 1946) – lead guitarist for the band Slade
- Edward Hill (1843–1923) – prolific artist, poet, songwriter and newspaper correspondent
- Matthew Hislop (born 1990) – footballer, defender
- Noddy Holder (born 1946) – from Walsall, singer/rhythm guitarist for Slade
- Rear Admiral John Holford (1909–1997) – medical officer in the Royal Navy; worked for the Ministry of Health, 1965–1974; later senior principal medical officer
- Dave Holland (born 1946) – jazz bassist
- Dave Holland (1948–2018) – drummer with Judas Priest
- Don Howe (born 1935) – football player, coach and manager
- Matthew Hudson-Smith (born 1994) – track and field sprinter, 4×400 metres relay gold medallist at the 2014 Commonwealth Games

== I ==
- Eric Idle (born 1943) – actor and comedian, attended the Royal Wolverhampton School
- David Inshaw (born 1943) – artist, founder member of the Brotherhood of Ruralists

== J ==
- Howard Jacobson (born 1942) – Booker Prize for Fiction-winning author and journalist
- Jamelia (born 1981) – musician, originally from Birmingham, now living in Wolverhampton
- Sir Stephen Jenyns (c. 1450–1523) – wool merchant; master of the Merchant Taylors' Company; mayor of London; founder of Wolverhampton Grammar School
- Charles Jones (1866–1959) – gardener and photographer
- Francis Jones (1914–1988) – physicist who co-developed the OBOE blind bombing system
- Jackery Jones (1877–1945) – footballer, full back; played over 300 games in the Football League for Wolverhampton Wanderers; member of the club's Hall of Fame; made his team debut in 1901, the first of 111 consecutive appearances; as full-back
- Jenny Jones (born 1948) – Labour Party politician
- Mandy Jones (born ca.1975) – Brexit Party politician
- Wayne 'The Wanderer' Jones (born 1965) – darts player
- William Highfield Jones (1829–1903) – industrialist, local politician, author and benefactor; built Jones Brothers & Co.; became an alderman and the 25th mayor of Wolverhampton
- Alfred John Jukes-Browne (1851–1914) – British invertebrate palaeontologist and stratigrapher
- Jake Jervis (born 1991) – professional footballer

== K ==
- Lisa Kehler (born 1967) – race walker, competed for Britain at the 1992 & 2000 Summer Olympics
- Chris Kelly (born 1978) – Conservative Party politician
- Jonathan Kemp (born 1981) – professional squash player, represented England
- Judith Keppel (born 1942) – quiz show contestant, first person to win one million pounds on the British television game show Who Wants to Be a Millionaire?
- Karl Keska (born 1972) – 10,000m runner, 8th at 2000 Summer Olympics
- Sir Rupert Alfred Kettle (1817–1894) – barrister, county court judge and arbitrator
- Syma Khalid – professor of Computational Biophysics in Chemistry at the University of Southampton
- Razzak Khan – stage and movie actor and comedian
- Mervyn King, Baron King of Lothbury (born 1948) – governor of the Bank of England 2003–2013
- Beverley Knight (born 1973) – soul singer
- Farida Khalifa (born 1972) – British reality television personality, notable for being the first housemate to compete in two separate civilian series of Big Brother UK

== L ==
- Stuart Lampitt (born 1966) – cricketer, right-handed batsman and a right-arm medium-pace bowler; took 370 List A wickets in all for Worcestershire, a record for the county
- Michael Langdon (1920–1991) – bass opera singer
- James Langley (1916–1983) – lieutenant colonel, Coldstream Guards, MI9
- Joanne Latham (born 1961) – English former glamour model
- Margery Lawrence (1889–1969) – pseudonym of Mrs. Arthur E. Towle; fantasy, horror and detective fiction author who specialized in ghost stories
- Winifred Lawson (1892–1961) – opera and concert singer
- Jim Lea (born 1949) – musician, member of Slade
- Margaret Lee (born 1943) – actress
- Joleon Lescott (born 1982) – footballer; graduate of the Wolves Academy, the Wolves' supporters Player of the Year (born in Birmingham)
- Sir Richard Leveson (1570–1605) – vice admiral of the Fleet for Life, hero of the Battle of Cádiz, 1596
- Denise Lewis – Olympic gold medallist, born in West Bromwich and raised in Wolverhampton
- Ephraim Lewis (1968–1994) – soul/neo-soul and R & B singer and songwriter
- Bob Lilley (1914–1981) – founding member of the British Special Air Service; member of the Coldstream Guards; one of the first four men selected by Colonel David Stirling to be a founder member of L Detachment 1st SAS in Middle East HQ Cairo 1940; took part in many special forces operations and missions behind enemy lines in Libya against Italian and German forces during World War II
- Adrian Littlejohn (born 1970) – footballer, midfielder/forward
- Anita Lonsbrough (born 1941) – gold medallist in swimming at the 1960 Summer Olympics, now lives in Tettenhall
- Augustus Edward Hough Love (1863–1940) – mathematician, worked on the theory of elasticity and mathematical model known as Love waves
- Des Lyttle (born 1971) – footballer (defender), football manager and coach

== M ==
- Macka B (born 1966) – real name Christopher MacFarlane, reggae artist, performer and Rastafari
- Alan Lindsay Mackay (1926–2025) – crystallographer; made scientific contributions related to the structure of materials; predicted quasicrystals in 1981
- John Malam (born 1957) – historian, archaeologist and author of children's non-fiction informational books
- Sir Charles Arthur Mander, 2nd Baronet JP, DL, TD (1884–1951) – public servant, philanthropist, manufacturer; managing director of Mander Brothers, the family paint, varnish and inks business established in 1773
- Sir Charles Marcus Mander, 3rd Baronet (1921–2006) – industrialist, property developer, landowner and farmer; known as Marcus Mander
- Sir Charles Tertius Mander (1852–1929) – manufacturer, philanthropist and public servant
- Sir Geoffrey Le Mesurier Mander (1882–1962) – chairman of Mander Brothers; Liberal MP for Wolverhampton East; donor of Wightwick Manor to the National Trust
- Miles Mander (1888–1946) – early Hollywood film actor, director and novelist
- Sir Nicholas Mander, 4th Baronet (born 1950) – British baronet; Fellow of the Society of Antiquaries
- Rob Marris (born 1955) – solicitor, politician and MP
- John Marston (1836–1914) – founder of the Sunbeam company, in Upper Villiers Street
- Scott Matthews (born 1976) – singer-songwriter
- John McHugh (1912–2002) – operatic tenor known for ballads and romantic tunes and lyrics
- Pat McFadden (born 1965) – MP for Wolverhampton South East
- Maria Miller (born 1964) – politician, MP and marketing consultant
- Mil Millington – journalist and novelist
- Caitlin Moran (born 1975) – broadcaster and columnist, grew up in Wolverhampton
- Geoffrey Moreland (1914–1996) – footballer, centre forward
- Sam Morsy (born 1991) – professional footballer for Bristol City
- John Morton (1925–2021) – head of the Musicians Union in London (1971–1990) and president of Federation of International Musicians (1973–2004)
- Jimmy Mullen (1923–1987) – spent his whole career, 1938–1959, playing for Wolverhampton Wanderers FC.; also played for England 12 times
- Penny Clark (Nee Mountford) (1975-) Olympic Sailor

== N ==
- Laura Newton (born 1977) – international cricketer; played for Wolverhampton and Staffordshire
- Johnny Nicholls (1931–1995) – footballer, inside forward
- Alfred Noyes (1880–1958) – poet

== O ==
- Jacqui Oatley (born 1975) – sports broadcaster
- Sean O'Connor (1981) – professional footballer, 2008 Scottish Cup finalist
- Sean O'Driscoll (born 1957) – footballer, midfielder, and football manager
- Mark O'Shea (born 1956) – herpetologist, photographer, author, lecturer and TV personality

== P ==
- Sara Page (1855–1943) – artist, portrait and figurative painter
- Dee Palmer (born 1937) – formerly David Palmer; composer, arranger, and keyboardist; known for having been a member of the rock group Jethro Tull
- Reverend Philip Pargeter (born 1933) – titular bishop of Valentiniana; retired Auxiliary Bishop of the Roman Catholic Archdiocese of Birmingham
- Phil Parkes (born 1947) – football goalkeeper; Wolverhampton Wanderers' first-choice keeper for much of late 1960s and early 1970s; appeared in 127 consecutive league matches, breaking Noel George's club record
- Derek Parkin (born 1948) – football player, full back; made 609 appearances for Wolverhampton Wanderers (a record); in 1968, became the most expensive full back in Britain when he joined Wolves for £80,000
- Florence Paton (1891–1976) – Labour Party politician; MP from 1945 to 1950
- Suzanne Paul (born 1957) – winner of New Zealand's Dancing with the Stars 2007
- Liam Payne (1993–2024) – contestant on The X Factor in 2010; singer-songwriter and former member of boy-band One Direction
- General Thomas Hooke Pearson (1806 Tettenhall – 1892) – senior British Army general
- Mike Perkins (born 1969) – comic book artist
- Andrew Pelling (born 1959) – politician; Conservative then independent MP
- Brian Pendleton (1944–2001) – rhythm guitarist with The Pretty Things in the sixties
- Jonn Penney (born 1968) – singer of Ned's Atomic Dustbin
- Dora Penny (1874–1964) – daughter of the Rector of Wolverhampton; a good friend of Edward Elgar and his family; immortalised as Dorabella in the Enigma Variations
- Fred Pentland (1883–1962) – footballer (forward) and football manager (including Germany (Olympic team), France, Athletic Bilbao, Atlético Madrid, Real Oviedo)
- Pauline Perry, Baroness Perry of Southwark (born 1931) – educationalist; Conservative politician; Her Majesty's Chief Inspector of Schools in England
- Shaun Perry (born 1978) – rugby union footballer, played scrum half
- Suzi Perry (born 1970) – television presenter
- Tom Phillips (born 1937) – artist, painter, printmaker, collagist
- Tom Phillipson (1898–1965) – footballer, several goal-scoring records for Wolverhampton Wanderers; became a businessman in Wolverhampton and town mayor
- George Phoenix (1863–1935) – Victorian/Edwardian landscape, figurative, and portrait artist and sculptor
- Bob Plant (1915–2011) – soldier, recipient of MC
- Robert Plant (born 1948) – singer in Led Zeppelin, born in West Bromwich
- Clive Platt (born 1977) – footballer, striker
- Hugh Porter (born 1940) – Olympic cyclist, broadcaster and media personality
- Lisa Potts – teacher and George Medal holder
- Don Powell (born 1946) – born in Bilston, drummer for Slade
- Enoch Powell (1912–1998) – politician (Member of Parliament for Wolverhampton South West 1950 – 1974), poet, scholar and soldier
- Hayley Price (born 1966) – gymnast, competed in the 1984 Summer Olympics in Los Angeles
- Ken Purchase (1939–2016) – politician, local MP

== R ==
- Aaron Rai (born 1995) – golfer
- Paul Raven (1961–2007) – musician and bass player
- William Regal (born 1968) – WWE/WCW/ECW wrestler and commentator; member of The Blue Bloods
- Oscar Gustave Rejlander (1813–1875) – set up as a portraitist in Wolverhampton, around 1846; "father of art photography"
- Emma Reynolds (born 1977) – politician (MP)
- John Rhodes (born 1927) – racing driver
- Mark Rhodes (born 1981) – singer and television presenter; known for TMi, Copycats and Pop Idol 2
- John Richards (born 1950) – international footballer, striker for Wolverhampton Wanderers, where he broke the club's goal-scoring record ending with 194 goals; later returned to Wolves as managing director 1994–2000
- Barry Rogerson (born 1936) – first bishop of Wolverhampton, 1979–1985; formerly vicar of St Thomas' Church, Wednesfield
- Carina Round (born 1979) – singer-songwriter
- Kevin Rowland (born 1953) – singer in Dexys Midnight Runners
- Arthur Rowley (1926–2002) – footballer, inside left and football manager
- Jack Rowley (1920–1998) – footballer, forward and football manager
- Sir Merton Russell-Cotes (1835–1921) – mayor of Bournemouth, 1894–1895, benefactor and hotelier

== S ==
- Wendy Sadler (born 1974) – science communicator and lecturer; founded Science Made Simple, which engages audiences with the physical sciences
- Tessa Sanderson (born 1956) – gold medallist in the javelin throw, 1984 Summer Olympics
- Sathnam Sanghera (born 1976) – journalist and author
- Scarlxrd (born 1994) – rap artist, rock/metal artist
- Keith Short (1941–2020)– sculptor, worked in the UK feature film industry
- Bill Shorthouse (1922–2008) – professional football player and coach; spent his playing career with Wolverhampton Wanderers
- George Showell (1934–2012) – footballer, played for Wolverhampton Wanderers, Bristol City and Wrexham; mainly with Wolverhampton Wanderers, featuring in two league championship-winning seasons and in the 1960 FA Cup Final.
- Robert of Shrewsbury (died 1212) – bishop of Bangor from 1197 to his death
- Jarnail Singh (born 1962) – football referee who officiated in the Football League
- Bill Slater (1927–2018) – international footballer, inside forward / defender mainly for Wolverhampton Wanderers; in the same year was voted Footballer of the Year; awarded an OBE in 1982for services to sport; awarded CBE in 1998
- Nigel Slater (born 1956) – food writer and journalist
- John Sleeuwenhoek (1944–1989) – footballer, centre-half; made 226 appearances in the Football League for Aston Villa; capped twice for England at under-23 level
- Dean Smith (born 1988) – racing driver; 2009 champion of the British Formula Renault Championship; winner of that year's McLaren Autosport BRDC Award
- Eleanor Smith (born 1957) – the Labour Member of Parliament (MP) for Wolverhampton South West from 2017 to 2019
- Harry Smith (born 1932) – footballer, left back
- Jack Smith (1882–??) – footballer, forward; scored 39 goals in 110 appearances playing for Wolverhampton Wanderers and Birmingham
- Vikram Solanki (born 1976) – England and Worcestershire cricketer
- Philip Solomon (born 1951) – spiritualist medium, author, broadcaster and paranormal researcher
- John Hanbury Angus Sparrow (1906–1992) – academic, barrister, book-collector and Warden of All Souls College, Oxford, 1952–77
- Mark Speight (1965–2008) – television presenter
- Roger Squires (born 1932) – world's most prolific crossword compiler
- Percy Stallard (1909–2001) – racing cyclist; founder of the British League of Racing Cyclists; as organiser of the 1942 Wolverhampton-Llangollen race, the father of massed-start cycle racing on public roads in Britain
- Derek Statham (born 1959) – footballer, full back
- Josef Stawinoga (1920–2007) – local hermit
- Richard Stearman (born 1987) – footballer, centre back, right back
- Paul Sterling (born 1964) – English/Welsh rugby league footballer of the 1990s and 2000s; played for England and Wales as a Wing
- Stevens family – Joe Stevens, father of Harry, George, Albert John ('Jack'), and Joe Stevens Junior; engineers, Stevens Screw Company Ltd and later A J Stevens & Co (AJS) motorcycles
- Dave Swift (born 1964) – bassist with Jools Holland's Rhythm and Blues Orchestra
- Meera Syal (born 1961) – comedian, writer, playwright, singer, journalist, producer and actress
- Jane Stevenson (born 1971) – MP for Wolverhampton North East since 2019

== T ==
- Mandy Takhar (born ca.1988) – British Indian model and actress, predominantly appears in Punjabi films
- Kalbir Takher (born 1968) – field hockey player, participated for Great Britain in Field hockey at the 1996 Summer Olympics
- James Tandy (born 1981) – former cricketer
- James W. Tate (1875–1922) – songwriter, accompanist; composer and producer of revues and pantomimes
- Jack Taylor (1930–2012) – referee, 1974 FIFA World Cup final
- Andy Tennant (born 1987) – professional track and road racing cyclist
- Dame Maggie Teyte (1888–1976) – soprano, creator of role of Melisande in Debussy's Pelléas et Mélisande; younger sister of James W. Tate
- Aaron Thiara (born 1993) – actor
- Kristian Thomas (born 1989) – British artistic gymnast; member of the Earls gymnastics club; educated at St Edmund's Catholic School, Wolverhampton
- George Rennie Thorne (1853–1934) – solicitor and politician
- Thomas Tomkis or Tomkys (c. 1580–1634) – playwright of the late Elizabethan and the Jacobean eras; one of the more cryptic figures of English Renaissance theatre
- Billy Tuft (born 1874) – footballer, full back
- Professor Herbert Turnbull (1885–1961) – mathematician
- Syd Tyler (1904–1971) – footballer, full back

== U ==
- Evelyn Underhill (1875–1941) – mystic and Anglican writer

== V ==
- Hugh Vallance (1905–1973) – footballer, centre forward; held a club record for goals scored in a season at Brighton and Hove Albion, the record eventually broken three years after his death
- Joseph Vickers de Ville (1856–1925) – painter of landscapes and rural subjects
- Sir Charles Pelham Villiers (1802–1898) – member of Parliament for 63 years, holding the record for being the longest serving MP in Parliamentary history; a statue of him stands in West Park in Wolverhampton

== W ==
- George Wallis (1811–1891) – artist, museum curator and art educator, first Keeper of Fine Art Collection at South Kensington Museum (Victoria & Albert Museum, London)
- David Watkins (born 1940) – designer of London 2012 Olympics medal; special effects maker for the film 2001: A Space Odyssey
- Stuart Watkiss (born 1966) – footballer (defender) and football manager
- Mickey Wernick (born 1944) – professional poker player
- Sir Charles Wheeler (1892–1974) – sculptor, former president of the Royal Academy
- Fred White (1916–2007) – footballer, goalkeeper
- Willard Wigan (born 1957) – sculptor, creates microscopic sculptures
- Jonathan Wild (1683–1725) – posed as a public-spirited vigilante, self-penned Chief Thieftaker General of Great Britain and Ireland
- Harry Wilding (1894–1958) – footballer, centre half; played for the Grenadier Guards, Chelsea, Tottenham Hotspur and Bristol Rovers
- Ashley Williams (born 1984) – footballer, defender
- Bert Williams (1920–2014) – spent his career, 1945–1959, playing for Wolverhampton Wanderers FC; also played for England 24 times
- Charles Williams (1887–1971) – Track and field athlete who competed in the 1908 Summer Olympics in London
- Gary Williams (born 1960) – footballer, won European cup with Aston Villa; played for Leeds, Bradford and Watford
- John Williams (born 1951) – A&R executive, record producer, photographer, manager, recording artist, songwriter
- Paul Willis (born 1945) – social scientist, major contemporary figure in sociology and cultural studies
- Marty Wilson (1957–2019) – professional poker player; biggest win was $171,000
- Tony Wilson (born 1964) – boxer, British light heavyweight champion, competed at the 1984 Summer Olympics
- Pete Winkelman (born 1957) – chairman of football club Milton Keynes Dons, property developer and former CBS Records executive
- Sam Winnall (born 1991) – footballer, striker, joined Wolves Academy, plays for Sheffield Wednesday
- William Wood (1671–1730) – lived at The Deanery, a large house in Wolverhampton; was given a contract as a mintmaster to strike an issue of Irish coinage, 1722–1724; this coinage was extremely unpopular as a result of the publication of Jonathan Swift's Drapier's Letters and was recalled
- Billy Wright (1924–1994) – captain of England and Wolverhampton Wanderers; for a long time, the most capped English football player; 490 caps for Wolves and 105 caps for England
- Billy Wright (1960–1997) – Wolverhampton-born prominent Ulster loyalist
- David Wright (born 1944) – British diplomat, UK ambassador to Japan 1996–1999
- Lady Wulfrun (c. 935–1005) – Anglo-Saxon noble woman and landowner, established a landed estate at Wolverhampton in 985

== Y ==
- Alison Young (born 1987) – sailor; competed in the Laser Radial class event at the 2012 Summer Olympics
- Percy M. Young (1912–2004) – musicologist, writer and composer
