= Dawn chorus (birds) =

Singing of birds at the start of a day

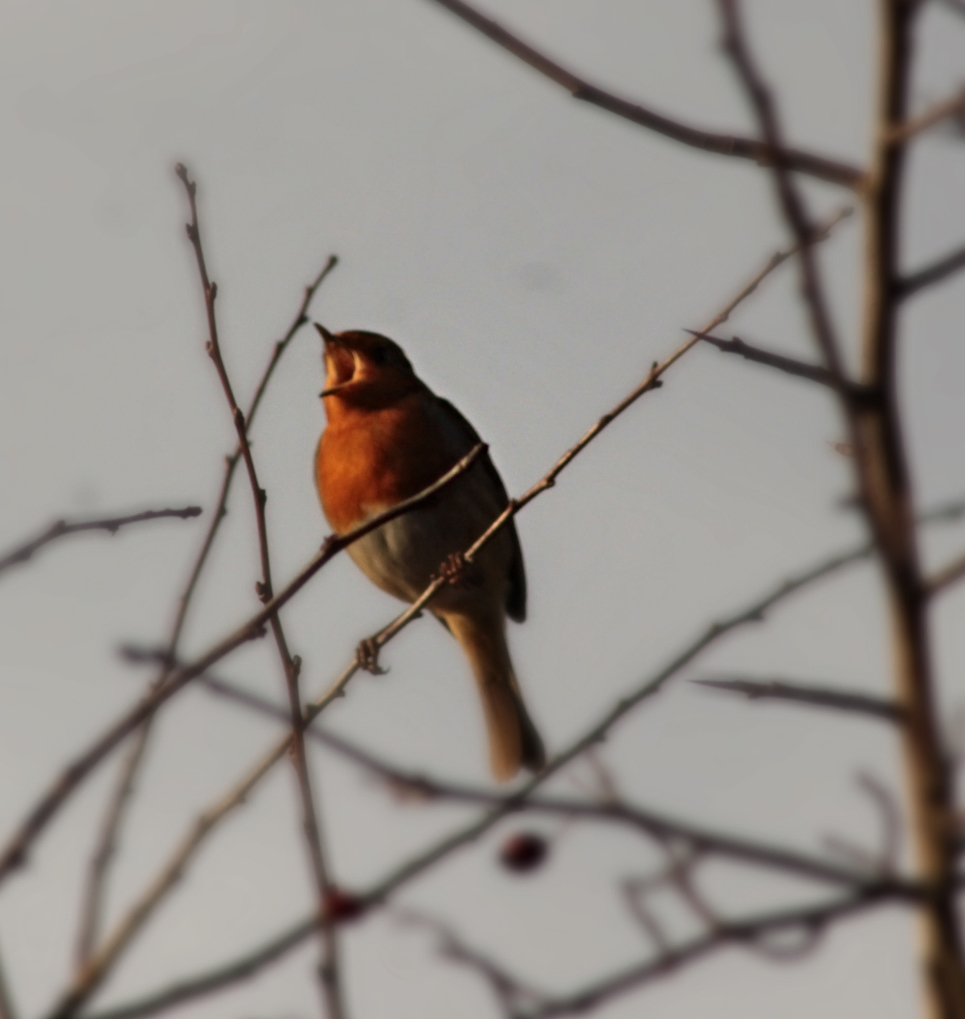
A European robin singing at dawn

Dawn chorus in the United Kingdom
Recording of a dawn chorus in Dorset, England

Dawn chorus of eastern US deciduous forest
Recording of a spring dawn chorus in Virginia, USA

The dawn chorus is the outbreak of birdsong at the start of a new day.

In temperate countries, this is most noticeable in spring when the birds are either defending a breeding territory, trying to attract a mate or calling in the flock. In a given location it is common for different species to perform their dawn singing at different times. In some areas where bird life is extensive and birds are vocal, the sound of a dawn chorus may make it difficult for humans to sleep in the early morning.

== Research ==
In a 2007 study of the Ecuadorian forest, it was determined that birds perching higher in the trees and birds with larger eyes tend to sing first. This may be due to differences in the amount of light perceived by the birds.

Researcher Anders Pape Møller used a play-back technique to investigate the effects of singing by the black wheatear (Oenanthe leucura) on the behaviour of both conspecifics and heterospecifics. It was found that singing increased in both groups in response to the wheatear. Moller suggested the dawn (and dusk) chorus of bird song may be augmented by social facilitation due to the singing of conspecifics as well as heterospecifics.

== Literary celebration ==
Literary celebrations of the dawn chorus include poetry by Sasha Dugdale and William K. Hathaway.

== International Dawn Chorus Day ==
An annual International Dawn Chorus Day is held on the first Sunday in May, when the public are encouraged to rise early to listen to bird song at organised events. The event originated from a private event held by environmentalist Chris Baines at Moseley Bog in Birmingham, England, in 1987. It was later promoted by the Wildlife Trust for Birmingham and the Black Country.

== See also ==
- Bird song
- Dawn chorus (electromagnetic)
- Natural sounds
