= Katie Edwards =

Katie Edwards may refer to:

- Katie Edwards-Walpole (born 1981), member of the Florida House of Representatives
- Katie B. Edwards (born 1978), English academic, writer, and broadcaster

== See also ==
- Kate Edwards (born c. 1965), geographer, writer, and content culturalization strategist
- Cate Edwards (born 1982), American attorney
- Kathleen Edwards (born 1978), Canadian singer-songwriter and musician
