= Centre of the Earth =

Coordinates: 52.4912°N 1.9348°W

The Centre of the Earth is a purpose-built environmental education centre in Birmingham, England, run by the Wildlife Trust for Birmingham and the Black Country.

== Location ==
It is 1.5 km away from Birmingham City Centre and was opened in 1993, and is claimed to be the first such purpose built centre in an urban setting in Europe. The centre is set in landscaped grounds (originally a council yard), providing a resource for learning and play. The Soho Loop of the BCN Main Line Canal is adjacent, and the centre has its own wharf, which has been restored.

== Building ==
The architect for the timber-framed building, which demonstrates the sustainable use of natural resources, was David Lea. Keith Hall, a founding member of the Association for Environment Conscious Building, built the centre. The building and its grounds are easily accessible to people with limited mobility.

== Activities ==
The centre is used as a base for a range of educational activities including:

- Activities for Primary and Secondary schools.
- Training for teachers, community, youth and play workers
- Workshops for students in higher education and teacher training.
- Afterschool activities and study support for children of different ages.
- Demonstrations of habitat creation in small urban spaces.
- A venue for meetings, workshops and training days
- A place to enjoy and study urban wildlife
