= Deer's Leap Wood =

Nature reserve in the West Midlands, England

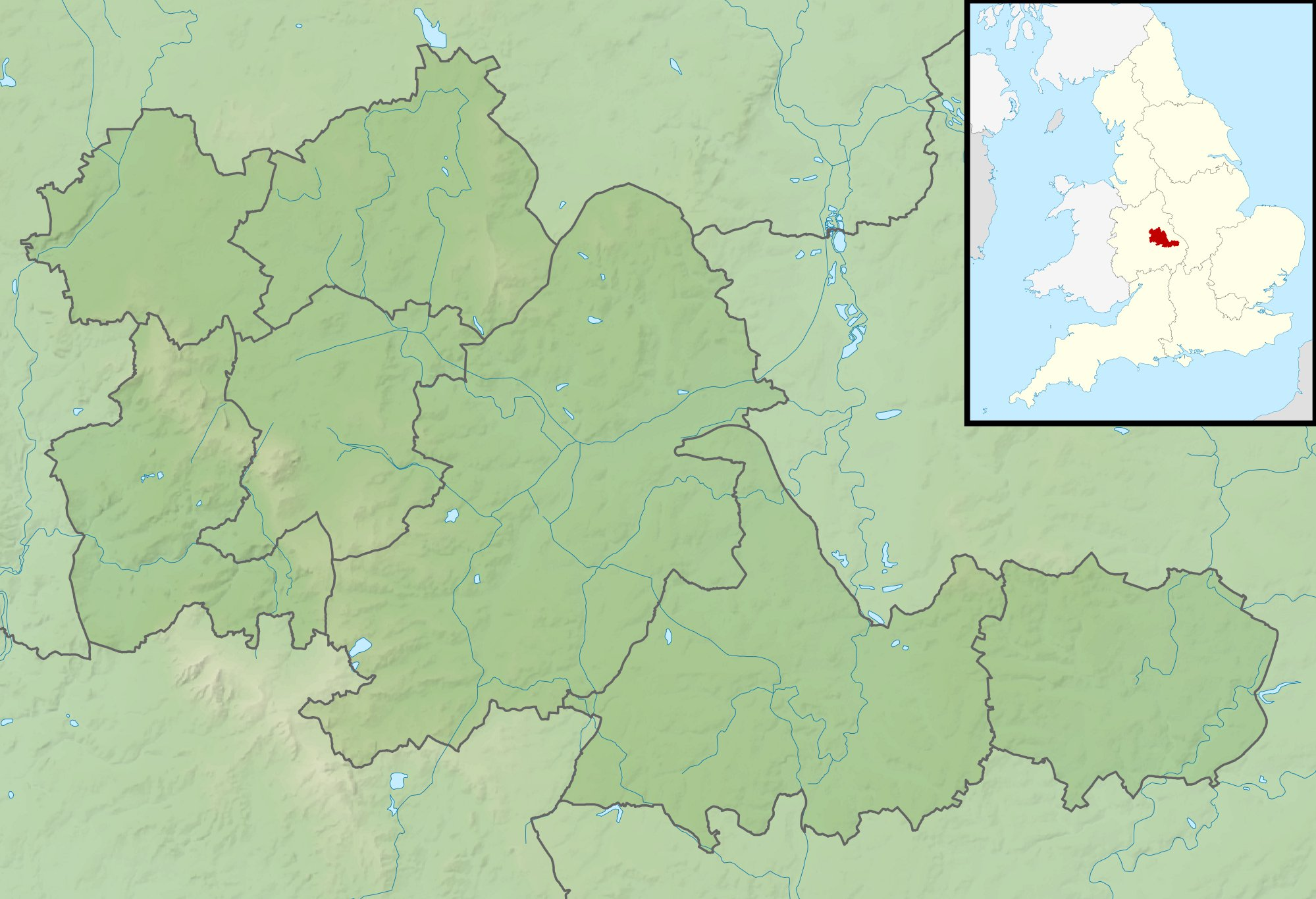
- Location within West Midlands county
- Location: Rotton Park, West Midlands
- OS grid: SP 031 871
- Coordinates: 52°28′54″N 1°57′24″W
- Area: 1.9 hectares (4.7 acres)
- Operator: Wildlife Trust for Birmingham and the Black Country
- Designation: Site of Local Importance for Nature Conservation
- Website: www.bbcwildlife.org.uk/deers-leap-wood

Deer's Leap Wood is a nature reserve of the Wildlife Trust for Birmingham and the Black Country, in West Midlands, England. There is woodland with a variety of tree species; also a pond and a meadow area.

== Description ==
The reserve has an area of about 1.9 hectares (4.7 acres). The northern boundary is Shireland Brook, historically the county boundary of Staffordshire and Warwickshire. It is in the Rotton Park area of Birmingham; it was in medieval times part of the Rotton Park estate of the de Bermingham family, where there was a deer park.

The reserve has been designated a Site of Local Importance for Nature Conservation.

The woodland has many species of trees, including birch, oak, field maple, wych-elm, hazel, and alder. There is a large pond, where moorhens, mallards and herons can be seen. The meadow, recently established, has many floral species, attracting a variety of insects.
