= Wildlife Trust for Birmingham and the Black Country =

Conservation organization in West Midlands, UK

The Wildlife Trust for Birmingham and the Black Country is a wildlife trust covering Birmingham and the Black Country in the West Midlands of England. It covers five of the seven districts of the West Midlands county: Birmingham, Dudley, Sandwell, Walsall and Wolverhampton.

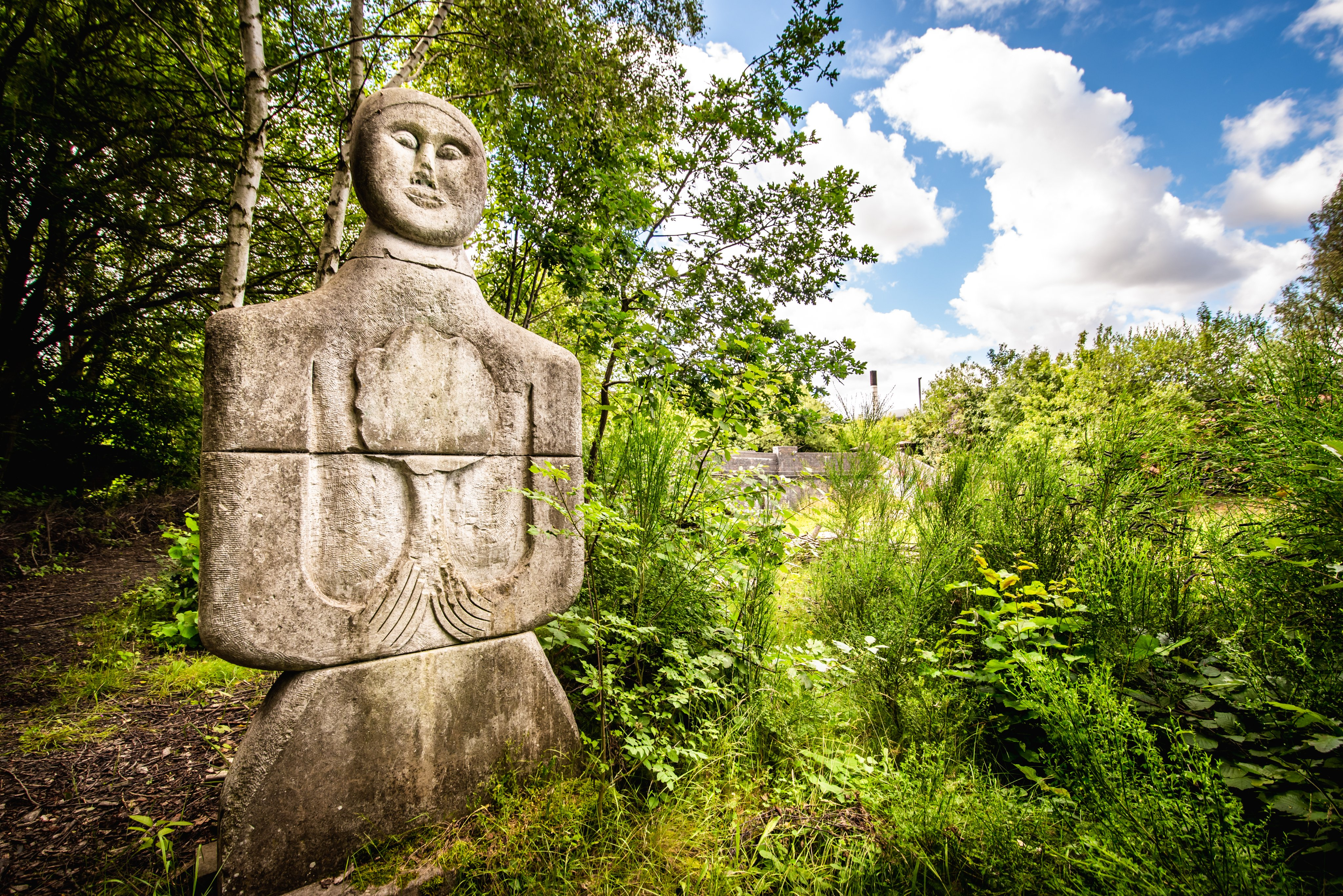
The grounds of the Wildlife Trust for Birmingham & The Black Country's headquarters in Winson Green.

== History ==
Created in 1980, by Chris Baines and others, it was formerly known as the Urban Wildlife Group, and then the Urban Wildlife Trust, the United Kingdom's first urban Wildlife Trust. It was responsible for the first ever International Dawn Chorus Day event, held at Moseley Bog in 1984. In the mid-1980s it established Plants Brook Nature Reserve in Birmingham.

The Trust was the first UK Wildlife Trust to become a member of Countdown 2010 the European initiative to halt the decline in biodiversity by 2010.

Black Country Living Landscape was a major initiative of the Trust that aimed to be the first practical application of the principles of landscape scale conservation to an urban area.

In 2012 the Trust built a partnership that was successful in getting Birmingham and the Black Country declared as one of the UK's first tranche of Nature Improvement Areas.

== Description ==
The organisation had a 40 hectare reserve at Park Hall near Minworth but despite opposition this was taken possession of by HS2 under powers granted by the High Speed Rail (London - West Midlands) Act 2017. Other nature reserves include Portway Hill, Deer's Leap Wood, Peascroft Wood, Richmond Garden in Soho, Birmingham and Hill Hook Local Nature Reserve. The Trust also manages Moseley Bog and has a close involvement with reserves such as Moorcroft Wood Local Nature Reserve. The Trust operates a number of environmental centres including the Centre of the Earth and the Birmingham EcoPark.

It is a full member of the Royal Society of Wildlife Trusts, (one of 46 covering the whole United Kingdom), and was the first urban Wildlife Trust and has a membership of over 11,000.

The trust carries out a wide range of activities to protest and develop biodiversity and engage with local people and various nature conservation, community and education projects. They carry out research, surveys and campaigns. Each year it co-ordinates International Dawn Chorus Day.

The Trust is managed by a council of trustees drawn from the membership. The Trust has about twenty full, part-time and contract staff and many active volunteers. They produce a regular magazine, Wildlife Focus, which provides coverage of their activities and a range of urban wildlife issues.
