= Lent Talks =

Christian talks on BBC Radio at Lent

- Genre: Christian radio
- Running time: 15 minutes
- Country of origin: United Kingdom
- Language: English
- Home station: BBC Radio 4
- Original release: 2007

Lent Talks is a series of talks, normally broadcast on BBC Radio 4 at 8:45 p.m. on a Wednesday in the United Kingdom, to mark the Christian season of Lent. They typically are brief talks, lasting about fifteen minutes, and have featured various speakers from different backgrounds. Each week, the speaker gives a talk on a different subject, and reflects on how this relates to the life of Christ.

== 2008 ==
Speakers in 2008 have included the Conservative politician Ann Widdecombe, and in 2007 featured Armando Iannucci, who discussed why the period between Ash Wednesday and Easter Sunday is longer than forty days. The final Lent Talk in 2008 was delivered on 19 March, by the Bishop of Durham, Tom Wright. His talk drew upon the Bible book Lamentations of Jeremiah, emphasising the negative moments in life and times when we need to sit and reflect. The theme of his talk, delivered during Holy Week, was to reflect on the period between the crucifixion and resurrection of Jesus Christ.

=== Speakers in 2008 ===
- 13 February 2008: Jude Kelly
- 20 February 2008: Terry Eagleton
- 27 February 2008: Mary Loudon
- 5 March 2008: Clive Stafford Smith
- 12 March 2008: Ann Widdecombe
- 19 March 2008: Tom Wright, the Bishop of Durham as from 2003

== 2009 ==
In 2009, the series of Lent Talks began on 4 March, with the first programme being broadcast by Martin Bell, talking about his experience in the war zones. The second edition was presented by Richard Holloway on 11 March, in which Holloway discussed the power of language and referred to the transcendence of God. His talk referred to both music and verbal language. He also referred to the problem of infinite regress as applied to the question of "Who made God"? providing an answer by stating that this question overlooks the transcendence of God. The third edition was entitled "Does God makes mistakes" and was presented by Sister Frances Domenica. The fourth edition was presented on 25 March by George Pattison, and was about "The Absence of God", dealing with the theme of how we cannot see God. Early in this edition, Pattison referred to the Anglican liturgy, in which it is said that God knows our hearts, and watches our inner movement. He later referred to the French atheist existentialist, Jean-Paul Sartre, describing Sartre's early loss of faith, and stating that Sartre remained, for the rest of his life, a resolute atheist. However, he later referred to the postmodernist philosopher Emmanuel Levinas, who said that although we cannot see God, God can see us, and discussed how this is important to Levinas' philosophy.

On 1/4 April, Frank Field presented Lent Talks. He described Lent as a time not merely of sackcloth and ashes, but as a time to divide the periods in our lives. The final edition of the Lent Talks in 2009 was broadcast on 8 April, and presented by the Jewish philosopher and theologian Melissa Raphael. Raphael's talk, "In God's Absence", reflected on the meaning of God for Jews during the Holocaust. Raphael mentioned how she, as a feminist Jew, had studied Christianity while at university but had remained a Jew.

=== Speakers in 2009 ===
- 8 April: Melissa Raphael, talking about "In God's Absence".
- 1 and 4 April: Frank Field.
- 25 March: George Pattison
- 18 and 21 March: Sister Frances Domenica, on "Does God Make Mistakes"?
- 11 March: Richard Holloway
- 4 March: Martin Bell

== 2010 ==
Lent Talks for 2010 began on 24 February with Will Self giving a talk on religion and the arts, and the spiritual sense that one can feel in church buildings. Maajid Nawaz, the director of the Quilliam Foundation, gave the Lent Talks on 10 March 2010. Alister McGrath presented the Lent Talks on 24 March 2010, on the relationship between religion and science - he mentioned Karl Popper, Peter Medawar and Sir Isaac Newton.

== 2011 ==
Lent Talks in 2011 began on 16 March 2011. Ian Blair was the first speaker and talked about religion in public life.

== 2012 ==
Lent Talks in 2012 began on 29 February 2012. Speakers in the 2012 series included John Lennox, Professor of Mathematics at Oxford University; Tariq Ramadan, Professor of Contemporary Islamic Studies at Oxford University and Linda Woodhead, lecturer in Religious Studies at The University of Lancaster.

The third of the Lent talks in 2012 was presented by John Lennox on the theme of science and religion. Early on in the programme, he quoted Albert Einstein: "The only thing that is incomprehensible about the universe is that it is comprehensible". He also referred to Alfred North Whitehead, as well as many scientists - such as Kepler or Galileo - who believed in God. Lennox said that Jesus Christ as the person, above all else, who did not fit into this world. He also clarified that was one of the reasons why he was a Christian.

The final talk in the 2012 series was given by Sr Gemma Simmonds CJ on Wednesday 4 April 2012.

== 2013 ==
The Lent talks for 2013 considered the theme of abandonment. They were commenced on 20 February 2013, by the human rights lawyer Helena Kennedy.

== 2018 ==
The theme for 2018 was trauma. That year's talks opened with "Man of Sorrows" by artist and songwriter Ben Okafor, who remembered Jesus' agony in Gethsemane and his own trauma as a child caught up in the Biafran war.

The second talk "Put Down Your Gun" was given by US Pastor and activist Rev Dr Tammy Williams. Williams contemplated Jesus' arrest in the Garden of Gethsemane and alternatives to gun violence.

Academic and writer Katie Edwards wrote and delivered the third Lent talk of 2018. As someone who witnessed the sexual abuse of her teenage friends in the 1990s, Edwards wondered whether she - and they - might have spoken out more readily if they had not been taught that silence in the face of suffering is a virtue. Edwards' talk was critically acclaimed, won The Jerusalem Award in the Festivals (Radio) category in 2018 and was awarded the Sandford St Martin runner up prize in the Radio/Audio category in 2019.

The final Lent talk of 2018 was delivered by Archbishop Justin Welby. In "The Cry From The Cross", Welby asks 'Did Jesus know that 'it would all be alright in the end?' The Archbishop argued that the point of being human is that God's promise that we will get through difficult times does not take away from the agony of the moment.

== 2020 ==
The theme of Lent Talks for 2020 was identity. It began with a talk by Rachel Mann, who talked about how if we think of Jesus as the Son of God, we think of him as barely human.

== 2021 ==
The theme of the Lent Talks for 2021 was "Hope as An Active Virtue". The first of these Lent talks was delivered by Dr Mark ZY Tan, and other talks were delivered by John Timpson, Paula Gooder and Jason Arday. The final one of these talks was delivered by the Right Reverend Dame Sarah Mullally.

The first Lent talk, entitled "A Letter to Lydia", intensive care doctor Mark ZY Tan narrates a letter written to his daughter, born during the COVID-19 pandemic about despair and hope while working on the frontline. It was shortlisted as a finalist for the Sandford St Martin awards 2022.
