= Jane Smart =

British ecologist

Jane Smart is a charity chief executive. She is the Global Director of the International Union for Conservation of Nature and Natural Resources (IUCN)'s Biodiversity Conservation Group and Head of its Species Program. The Biodiversity Conservation Group comprises the Species Programme, Protected Areas Programme, Global Marine Programme as well as the Invasive Species Initiative. As Head of the Species Programme Jane is responsible for around 35 staff based in Switzerland, Washington DC, US and Cambridge, UK and is responsible for managing the compilation and production of The IUCN Red List of Threatened Species™.

Her career has included posts as Conservation Director for the London Wildlife Trust and Director of Plantlife.

She co-authored (with Chris Baines) A guide to habitat creation (ISBN 1-85341-031-4).

== Urban Ecology ==
In 1985, New Scientist journal reported that Dr. Smart provided her expertise to the Greater London Council in creating urban wildlife sites such as wildflower meadows on school grounds or attracting wildlife to factory grounds.

== See also ==
- International Union for Conservation of Nature and Natural Resources
