= Birmingham EcoPark =

English eco-educational center

Coordinates: 52.472201°N 1.829696°W

The Birmingham EcoPark is an environmental education centre in the Small Heath area of Birmingham, England, operated by the Wildlife Trust for Birmingham and the Black Country. Each year there are thousands of visitors to the site. EcoPark offers opportunities for families, schools and local residents of all ages to get hands on with nature.
