= Peascroft Wood =

Nature reserve in the West Midlands, England

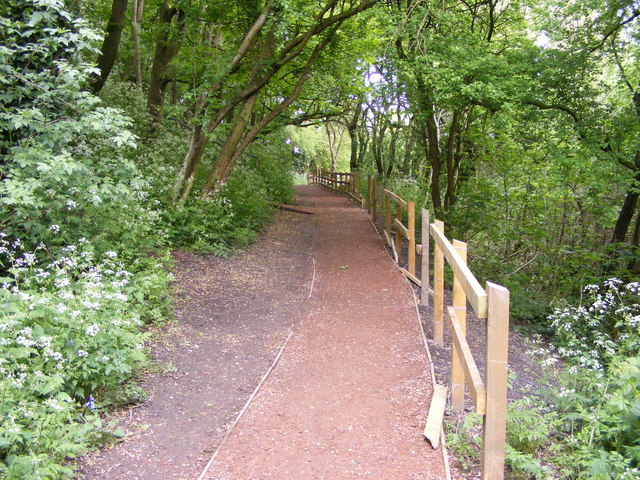

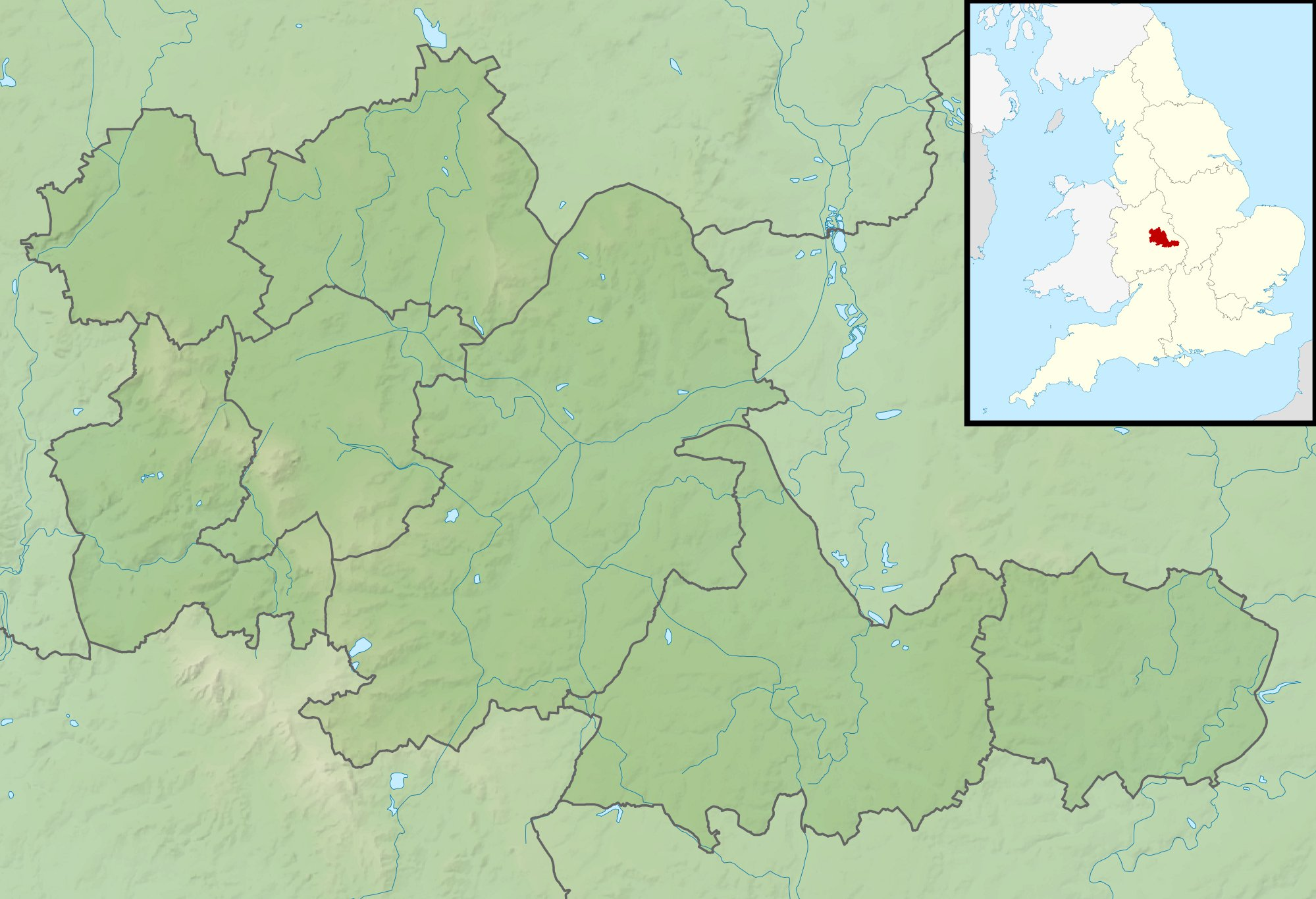
- Location within West Midlands county
- Location: Bilston, West Midlands
- OS grid: SO 950 970
- Coordinates: 52°34′14″N 2°4′30″W
- Operator: Wildlife Trust for Birmingham and the Black Country
- Website: www.bbcwildlife.org.uk/peascroft-wood-plan-visit

Peascroft Wood is a nature reserve of the Wildlife Trust for Birmingham and the Black Country, in Bilston, West Midlands, England.

== Description ==
The wood is situated between Mountford Lane and Peascroft Lane, north of the town centre.

It was planted in the early 20th century by the Midland Reafforesting Association, on mounds of coal spoil and the foundations of demolished cottages, the remains of earlier industrial activity.

There is a diversity of broadleaved trees, including hazel, field maple, sycamore and ash. Trees can be identified by information posts placed around the wood. Primrose and bluebell, introduced in the 1980s, appear in the spring. There are woodland birds, such as robin and wren.
