= Soho Loop =

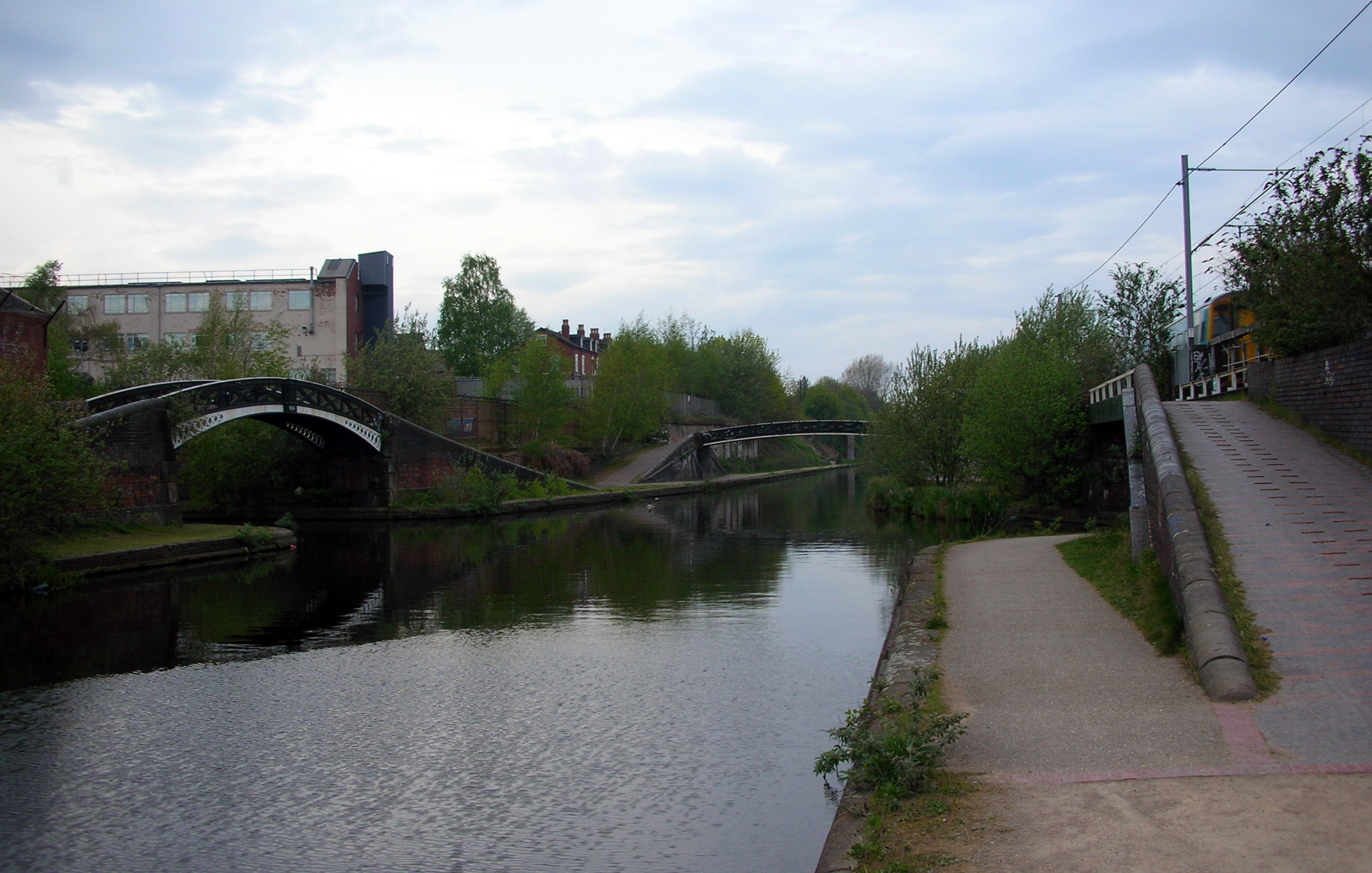
- Rotton Park Junction — the Soho Loop runs through the bridge to the right

Specifications
- Maximum height above sea level: 453 ft (138 m) (Birmingham Level)
- Status: Open
- Navigation authority: Canal and River Trust

History
- Date completed: 1769

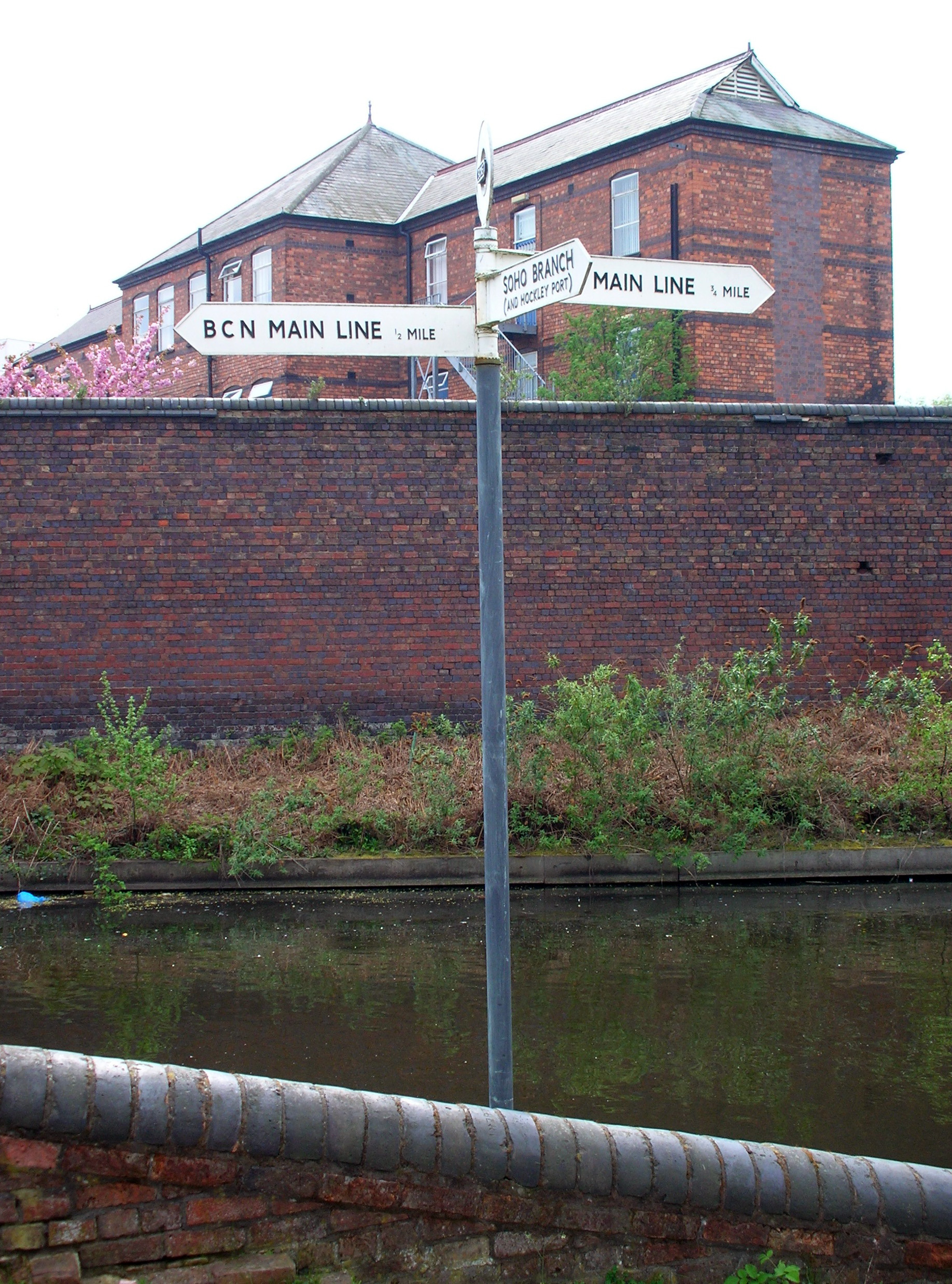
Hockley Port Junction on the Soho Loop

The Soho Loop is a 1.2-mile (2 km) section of the eighteenth-century Old BCN Main Line canal in Birmingham, England, about 1.2 miles (1.9 km) west of the city centre, which opened to traffic on 6 November 1769, and was bypassed in September 1827 by a straight 0.75-mile (1.2 km) section of the New BCN Main Line. Much of the 110 acres (45 ha) of enclosed land is occupied by the 49 acres (20 ha) of Birmingham's City Hospital, and the canal itself serves private residential moorings at Hockley Port Basin via a 310 yards (280 m) branch extending north-eastwards. This is all that remains of the former Soho Branch that once served Matthew Boulton's Soho Manufactory. There is pedestrian access to a tow path for the entire length of the outside of the loop, which skirts the southern boundary of Winson Green Prison and twice passes underneath the Stour Valley Railway. The Centre of the Earth environmental education centre is adjacent to the canal and has a long wharf frontage.

Point	Coordinates (Links to map resources)	OS Grid Ref	Notes
Rotton Park Junction	52.4843°N 1.9291°W	SP048874	BCN Old and New Lines cross
Hockley Port Basin	52.4925°N 1.9265°W	SP051883	No public access
Winson Green Junction	52.4912°N 1.9424°W	SP039881	BCN Old and New Lines cross

== See also ==
- Icknield Port Loop
