= William Gibbons (physician) =

English physician

- Born: 25 September 1649; Wolverhampton
- Died: 25 March 1728 (aged 78)
- Occupation: Physician

William Gibbons (25 September 1649 – 25 March 1728) was an English physician.

== Biography ==
Gibbons was born at Wolverhampton 25 September 1649, was the son of John Gibbons of that town. From Merchant Taylors' School he went to St. John's College, Oxford, graduating B.A. in 1672, M.B. in 1675, and M.D. in 1683. He practised as a physician in London, joined the Royal College of Physicians in 1691, became fellow in 1692, and censor in 1716. He is not remembered by any writings, but chiefly as the Mirmillo of the ‘Dispensary’ of Sir Samuel Garth. He was one of the few college fellows who opposed the project of dispensaries for the poor, and so incurred the satire of Garth, who makes him say:

While others meanly asked whole months to slay, I oft despatched the patient in a day.

He is described by a contemporary (Nichols, Lit. Illustr. ii. 801) as ‘pretty old Dr. Gibbons,’ and as taking his fees with alacrity. The Harveian oration of the year following his death (1729) ascribes to him erudition, honesty, candour, love of letters, piety, benevolence, and other Christian virtues. According to William Wadd (Mems., Maxims, and Memoirs, p. 148), the credit of making mahogany fashionable belongs to Gibbons. His brother, a West Indian shipmaster, brought home some of that wood as ballast, and gave it to the doctor, who was building a house. The carpenters finding it too hard for their tools, it was thrown aside; but some of it was afterwards used to make a candle-box, which looked so well that a bureau of the same wood was taken in hand. When finished and polished, the bureau was so pleasing that it became an object of admiration to visitors, among others the Duchess of Buckingham, who had one made like it and so brought the wood into fashion. Gibbons left no writings. He died on 25 March 1728. He was a liberal benefactor to Wolverhampton, his native place. A portrait of him was placed at St. John's College, Oxford.
