= Mathew Guest =

British sociologist and professor

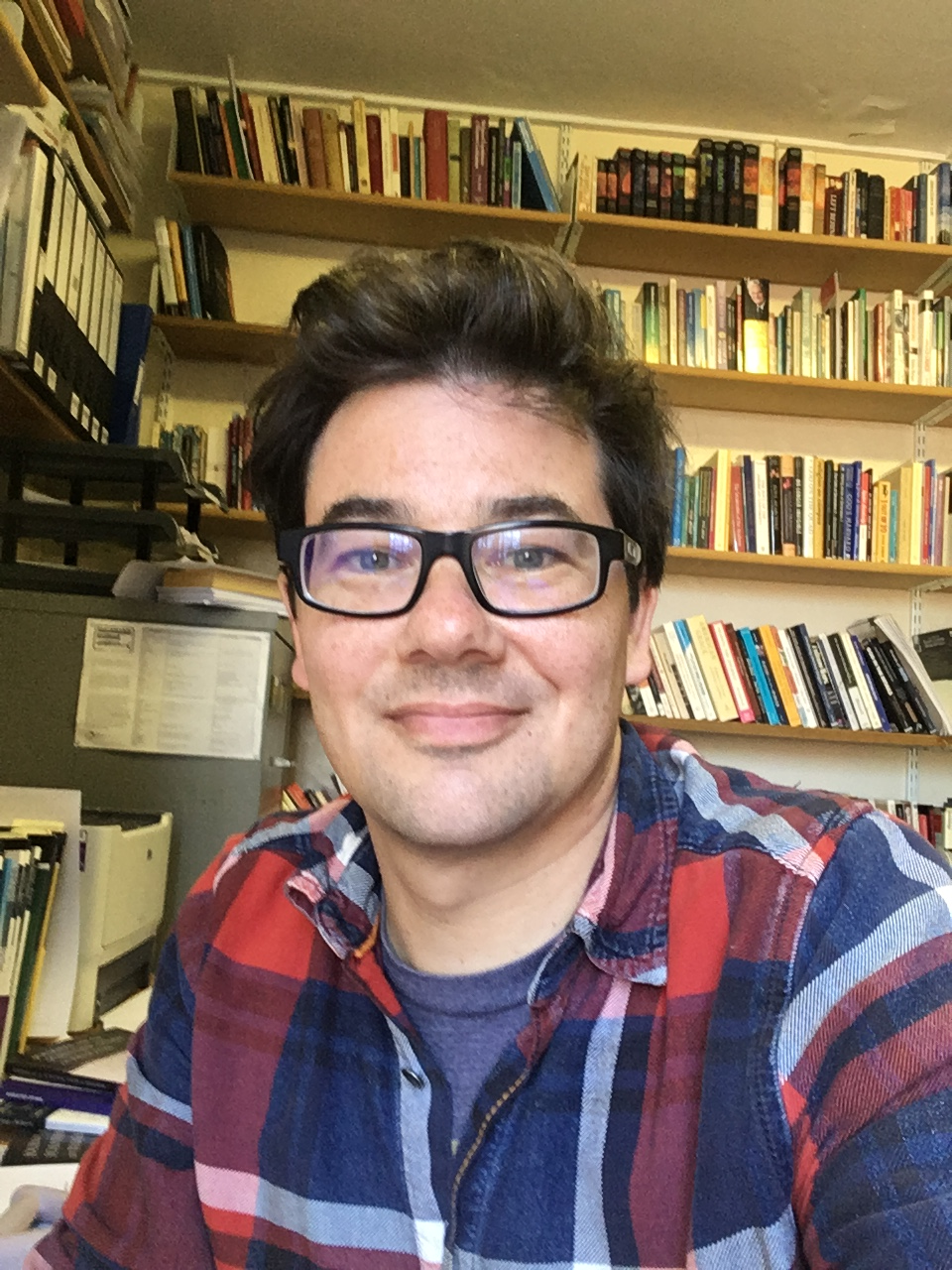
- Guest in 2018
- Born: Wolverhampton, West Midlands, UK.
- Education: University of Nottingham; Lancaster University
- Occupation: Professor of Sociology of Religion
- Spouse: Katie B. Edwards
- Writing career
- Language: English

Mathew Guest (born 9 February 1975) is a British sociologist and professor of sociology of religion at Durham University. Guest is the author or editor of numerous academic books, reports, journal articles and essays. His publications cover various topics in the sociology of religion, particularly evangelical Christianity in the UK, value transmission within clergy families, and the status of Christianity and Islam within university contexts.

Beyond academic contexts, he has published essays in popular outlets including The Conversation, Open Democracy, The Tablet and The Church Times.

During 2021–2024, he is serving as chair of the British Sociological Association's Religion Study Group.

He is a Fellow of the Royal Society of Arts.

== Biography ==
Guest was born in Wolverhampton, West Midlands in the UK.

He trained in theology (Nottingham University), religious studies (University of Lancaster) and sociology (University of Lancaster), and his research is primarily located within the sociology of religion.

== Academic Research ==
Guest has led or co-led five major empirical projects on religion within the United Kingdom, receiving research funding from the Arts and Humanities Research Council, the Economic and Social Research Council, the Church of England and Porticus. His research has focused on the institutional framing of religion in the 21st century, with a particular focus on how Christian identities are expressed within congregations, families and the cultural contexts of higher education.

Since 2013, this research has included the ways in which institutions contribute to the marginalisation and stigmatisation of minority identities, including Muslims. Guest is notable for his academic work on the Prevent Strategy.

=== Work on Islam on Campus and the Prevent Strategy ===
Guest was a member of the cross-university academic team for the Re/presenting Islam on Campus project (2015–2018), the first national empirical study of how Islam and Muslims are perceived within UK universities.

Guest was lead author on the project report and his contribution to the project's monograph Islam on Campus (2020) includes a critical analysis of the impact of the government's counterterrorism Prevent Strategy. The launch of the project report was widely covered across the media.

The Re/presenting Islam on Campus book and report constitute, according to one reviewer, “the largest and richest data sets yet collected on this topic”.

== Bibliography ==
=== Books ===
- Evangelical Identity and Contemporary Culture: A Congregational Study in Innovation (2007)
- Bishops, Wives and Children: Spiritual Capital Across the Generations (2007)
- Christianity and the University Experience: Understanding Student Faith (2013)
- Islam on Campus: Contested Identities and the Cultures of Higher Education in Britain (2020)
- Neoliberal Religion: Faith and Power in the Twenty-first Century (2022)

=== Edited volumes ===
- Congregational Studies in the UK: Christianity in a Post-Christian Context (2004)
- Religion and Knowledge: Sociological Perspectives (2012)
- Death, Life and Laughter: Essays on Religion in Honour of Douglas Davies (2017)

=== Research Reports ===
- Gender and career progression in theology and religious studies (2013)
- Chaplains on Campus: Understanding Chaplaincy in UK Universities (2019)
- Islam and Muslims on UK University Campuses: perceptions and challenges (2020)
