= George Barnsby =

English author and Socialist scholar

- Born: George J. Barnsby c. January 1919; Battersea, Surrey, England
- Died: 11 April 2010; Wolverhampton, Staffordshire, England
- Occupations: Teacher, scholar, historian and author
- Known for: Secretary of the Wolverhampton branch of the Communist party; Member of the Midlands district committee and secretariat of the Communist party; Founder member of Wolverhampton Community Relations Council
- Spouse: Esme T. L. Collins
- Parent(s): George Barnsby and Eleanor J. "Clara" Hale

George J. Barnsby (c. January 1919–11 April 2010) was an English author and Socialist scholar.

== Biography ==
He was born and grew up in Battersea, Surrey. Following military service in India and Burma he studied at the London School of Economics where he obtained an economics degree enabling him to become a teacher. His interest in socialism dated back to his pre-war experiences and his convictions were strengthened by his military service.

In the late 1970s he took time off from teaching to study at University of Birmingham, producing two books, The Working Class Movement in the Black Country 1750–1867 (1977) and Social Conditions in the Black Country 1800–1900 (1980), which earned him an MA and a PhD.

He retired early due to heart problems and then wrote extensively on the history of Chartism, education, housing, the ideas of the Welsh social reformer Robert Owen, and the 1926 general strike in the Black Country. He also produced a major work in 1998, Socialism in Birmingham and the Black Country 1850–1939.

== Bibliography ==
- The Great Indian Famine, 1943–1944 (1973) (as George J. Barnsby) Working Class Library and Free Communist Bookshop ASIN B001PDWVZS
- The Working Class Movement in the Black Country 1750–1867 (1977) Integrated Publishing Services ISBN 0905679083
- Social Conditions in the Black Country 1800–1900 (1980) Integrated Publishing Services (April ISBN 0905679024
- The Standard of Living in England 1700-1900 (1985) Integrated Publishing Services ISBN 0905679059
- Votes for Women – The Struggle For the Vote in the Black Country, 1900–1918 (1995) Socialist History Society, occasional pamphlet series ISBN 0952381028
- Socialism in Birmingham and the Black Country 1850–1939 (1998) Integrated Publishing Services ISBN 0905679105
- Subversive – or one third of the autobiography of a Communist (2002) George Barnsby Books ISBN 0905679199
- Combating Institutional Racism in Wolverhampton (2002)
