= Noel George =

English footballer (1897–1929)

Personal information
- Full name: Frank Noel George
- Date of birth: 26 December 1897
- Place of birth: Lichfield, England
- Date of death: 16 October 1929 (aged 31)
- Height: 5 ft 11 1/2 in (1.82 m)
- Position: Goalkeeper

Senior career*
| Years | Team | Apps | (Gls) |
| ? | Hednesford Town | ? | |
| 1919–1928 | Wolves | 222 | (0) |
- * Club domestic league appearances and goals

Frank Noel George (26 December 1897 – 16 October 1929) was an English footballer in the 1910s and 1920s who played as a goalkeeper.

== Early career and Army ==
Born in Lichfield, he started playing as a forward with Hednesford Town before joining the Royal Army Service Corps in World War I. It was during his days in the army that he switched to the goalkeeper position.

== Wolverhampton Wanderers ==
George was signed by Wolverhampton Wanderers (Wolves) in the summer of 1919, making his senior debut in February 1921 in an FA Cup replay against Derby County. Wolves were to go on and make the final of the competition that season, and George played in the final, which was lost to Tottenham Hotspur.

He established himself as the Wolves keeper, and was an ever-present in the 1921–22, 1923–24 and 1924–25 seasons, and in all he made 242 senior competitive appearances for Wolves, 222 of which were in The Football League. He kept a total of 73 clean sheets for Wolves.

== Illness and death ==
George started to miss a number of games through injury in the 1925–26 and 1926–27 seasons and by November 1927 he was in the early stages of a terminal illness, and he retired in 1928. It was diagnosed as a disease of the gums and he died on October 16, 1929. His manager at Wolves, Frank Buckley, was convinced that his death was a result of ill-fitting dentures and thus from then on he ensured any of his players with dentures made regular visits to the dentist.

== Honours ==
Wolverhampton Wanderers

- Football League Third Division North: 1923–24
- FA Cup runner-up: 1920–21
