= William K. Hathaway =

American poet (born 1944)

William 'Kit' Hathaway
- Born: 1944 (age 81–82)
- Occupations: Poet, professor of creative writing
- Writing career
- Period: 1960s–2010s
- Genre: Poetry

William K. Hathaway (born 1944) is a contemporary American poet who has published ten collections of poetry with Ithaca House, Louisiana State University Press, University of Central Florida Press, Canios Editions, and Chester Creek Press. Hathaway's most recent book, Dawn Chorus: New and Selected Poems 1972-2017, was published in March 2018 by Somondoco Press. He is retired and currently resides in Belfast, Maine.

== Poetry ==
Hathaway is perhaps best known for his poem "Oh, Oh," which is included in many college textbooks, including The Bedford Introduction to Literature. His poems have also appeared in several anthologies, including New American Poets of the '90s and Disenchantments: An Anthology of Modern Fairy Tale Poetry. In a jacket blurb for Hathaway's 1992 collection Churlsgrace, poet Hayden Carruth remarked, "when I finish reading a poem by Hathaway I feel smarter than I was before, not, as with most poems, stupider. ... Hathaway has a rare intelligence, and when he writes he uses it – which is even rarer. May he be showered with blessings."

In an interview with Adam Tavel at Poets' Quarterly, Hathaway comments that he considers much of his work to be in the lyrical tradition of Keats and Wordsworth, but that his more sardonic poems "take on a sort of “anti” voice, but with not a consciously subversive intention." Much of Hathaway's early work is written in confessional free verse, as it addresses his struggles with alcoholism that "made a struggle of life," but the central focus of his oeuvre is nature and the rural landscape which remains "ceaselessly poignant."

== Career ==
Hathaway taught for over thirty years at several colleges and universities, including Cornell University, Union College, and Louisiana State University.

== Works ==
=== Poetry collections ===
- True Confessions & False Romances. Ithaca, NY: Ithaca House. 1972. ISBN 978-0-87886-013-5.
- A Wilderness of Monkeys. Ithaca, NY: Ithaca House. 1975. ISBN 978-0-87886-072-2.
- The Gymnast of Inertia. Baton Rouge, LA: Louisiana State University Press. 1982. ISBN 978-0-8071-0981-6.
- Fish, Flesh & Fowl. Baton Rouge, LA: Louisiana State University Press. 1985. ISBN 978-0-8071-1233-5.
- Looking into the Heart of Light. Gainesville, FL: University Press of Florida (The University of Central Florida Contemporary Poetry Series). 1988. ISBN 978-0-8130-0901-8.
- Churlsgrace. Gainesville, FL: University Press of Florida (The University of Central Florida Contemporary Poetry Series). 1992. ISBN 978-0-8130-1126-4.
- Sightseer. Sag Harbor, NY: Canios Editions. 2001. ISBN 978-1-8864-3510-0.
- Promeneur Solitaire. Chestertown, NY: Chester Creek Press. 2005.
- The Right No. Shepherdstown, WV: Somondoco Press. 2012. ISBN 978-0-9853898-0-2.
- Dawn Chorus: New and Selected Poems 1972–2017. Shepherdstown, WV: Somondoco Press. 2017. ISBN 978-0997129946.
