= Katie B. Edwards =

English academic and writer

Katie Edwards
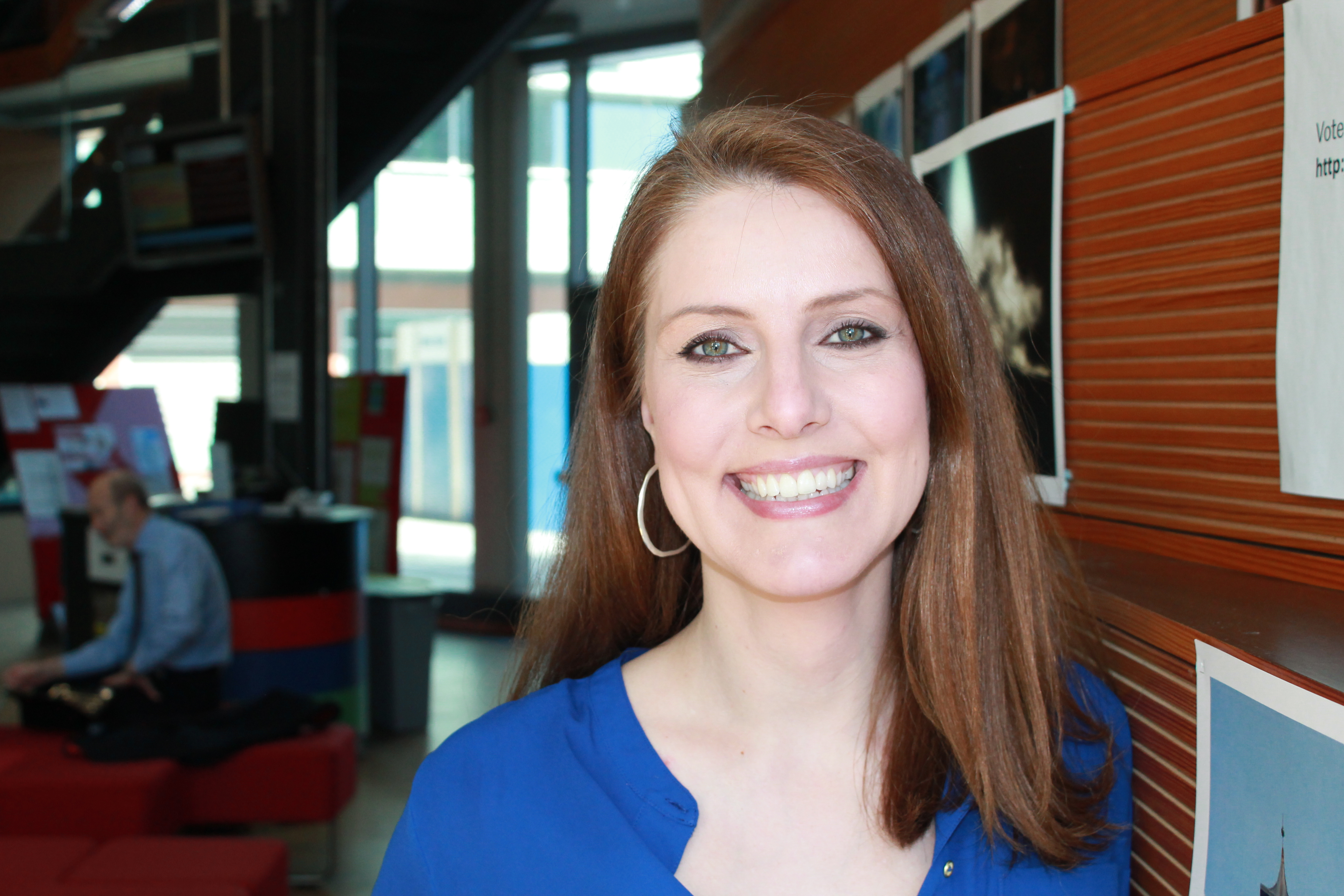
- Edwards in 2015
- Born: Mexborough, Doncaster, England
- Education: University of Sheffield (BA, PhD)
- Occupations: Writer, broadcaster, academic, editor
- Spouse: Mathew Guest
- Writing career
- Language: English
- Website: www.katiebedwards.com

Katie Edwards (born 14 August 1978) is an English academic, writer, columnist, editor and broadcaster.

== Early life ==
Edwards was born and raised in Mexborough, Doncaster, England and attended a comprehensive school in Rotherham.

== Education ==
Edwards was awarded a first class degree and a PhD in Biblical Studies from the University of Sheffield, where she worked as an academic in the School of English from 2012 to 2020. She is currently a visiting fellow in the Department of Theology and Religious Studies at the University of Chester.

== Career ==
=== Academic Research ===
Religion and sexual violence is a key area of Edwards's academic research. Until 2020, she was a founding co-director of The Shiloh Project, an academic collaboration dedicated to the study of religion and rape culture. In 2018, an article Edwards co-authored about Jesus and sexual violence sparked widespread discussion in the media.

=== Broadcasting ===
Edwards is a radio presenter and appears regularly on local and national radio as a current affairs commentator.

Edwards wrote and presented the 2018 Lent Talk 'Silence of the Lamb' for BBC Radio 4, which won The Jerusalem Award in the Festivals (Radio) category in 2018 and was awarded Runner Up in the Audio/Radio category at the Sandford St Martin Awards in 2019.

Edwards has written several articles about the trolling of Katie Price in the national press. In December 2022, Edwards featured in a Channel 5 documentary, Shameless: The Rise and Fall of Katie Price, charting Price's career trajectory.

=== Journalism ===
Edwards joined the UK edition of The Conversation as Commissioning Editor for Health and Medicine in January 2024. Since January 2026, she has co-hosted the Strange Health video podcast.

Edwards has written widely for the Press, including The Guardian, The i Newspaper, The Daily Telegraph, The Washington Post, the New Statesman, The Independent, and Newsweek.

==== Coverage of Depp V Heard US Defamation Trial ====
Edwards wrote extensively on the Depp v. Heard trial in 2022 and was interviewed by news channels, including BBC Worldwide, TalkTV and numerous radio programmes, commenting on the ruling in April 2022. She also covered the impact of the trial in the months following its conclusion.

=== Work On Accent Prejudice ===
Edwards has publicly discussed her experience of accent prejudice in higher education and her articles have been cited in the media, in English language subject educational materials, and academic work on accentism.
