= The Royal School, Wolverhampton =

Location
- Penn Road; Wolverhampton, West Midlands, WV3 0EG; England; 52.5723°N 2.1382°W

Information
- Type: Free school
- Motto: Nisi Dominus Frustra ("Except the Lord in Vain")
- Religious affiliation: Church of England
- Established: 1850; 176 years ago
- Department for Education URN: 143101 Tables
- Ofsted: Reports
- Principal: Tom Macdonald
- Gender: Co-educational
- Age: 4 to 18
- Enrolment: 1,363
- Website: theroyalschool.co.uk

The Royal School, Wolverhampton is a co-educational free school and sixth form for day and boarding pupils in Wolverhampton, West Midlands, England. It is the only state school of its type in the UK to have a Royal Charter and it has been a free school since September 2016. The school was previously a fee paying private school and it is now one of a handful of state boarding schools in the country.

== History ==
The Royal School, Wolverhampton began life as The Wolverhampton Orphan Asylum. It was founded in 1850 by John Lees, a local lock-manufacturer and freemason, after a cholera epidemic ravaged the town and left many children orphaned. The orphanage was completely funded by voluntary subscription and was dedicated to the education and maintenance of children who had lost one or both parents.

The Royal Orphanage of Wolverhampton came into being in 1891 when Queen Victoria gave permission for the prefix 'Royal' to be used. The charity carried on using this title until the late 1940s when King George VI permitted it to be re-styled The Royal Wolverhampton School.

The following decade saw a rapid decline in the number of pupils as the newly formed Welfare State took over some of the school's responsibilities. The cost of caring for orphans also dramatically increased and so the constitution was controversially changed to allow the admission of fee-paying pupils. Their proportion steadily grew to the extent that they eventually constituted around 90% of its students.

The school became a free school in September 2016.

== Buildings and Facilities ==
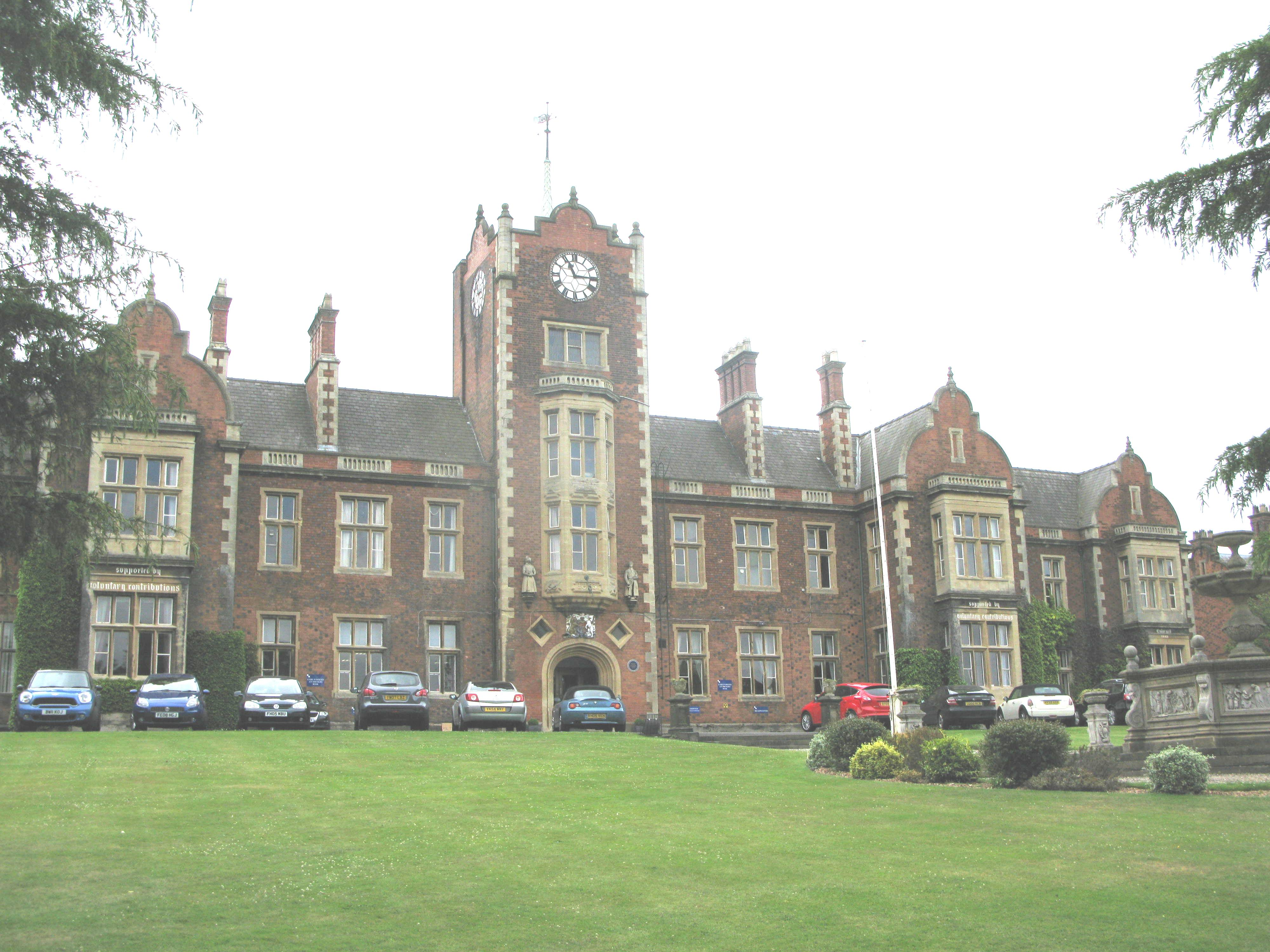
The Royal Wolverhampton School, Penn Road

The school's original premises were at 46 Queen Street, Wolverhampton. In 1854 it moved to new buildings on Penn Road. These have been greatly extended over the years but they still form the nucleus of the current school.

=== Hilda Hayward Swimming Pool ===
The original Hilda Hayward swimming pool was constructed in the 1970s with money donated by the Hayward Foundation. It was named in honour of Sir Charles Hayward's wife who died during its construction.

This pool was destroyed in a fire in February 2005. Its replacement, also called the Hilda Hayward swimming pool, cost £2.5 million and was opened by Prince Edward in September 2006.

The Hilda Hayward pool also provides facilities for the School's Elite Swim Club and Learn to Swim Programme, part of the Amateur Swimming Association.

== Royal Patronage ==
The school's patron is Prince Edward, the youngest son of Queen Elizabeth II. Prince Edward succeeded his grandmother, Queen Elizabeth the Queen Mother, in this role.

== Forces bursaries ==
The children of serving personnel in the British Army, Navy or Royal Air Force are afforded £1,000 a term per child of military personnel in order to help them pay for their children to board.

Eric Idle was an Orphan's scholarship holder and benefited from a forces bursary as his late father had been a former member of the RAF.

== Extracurricular Activities ==
=== Sport ===
The main sports on offer are athletics, basketball, football, cricket, rounders, netball and swimming.

=== CCF ===
Pupils in Year 9 up until Year 13 can choose to be a member of the Combined Cadet Force (CCF).

=== Police Cadets ===
Pupils in Year 9 up until Year 13 can choose to be a member of the Police Cadets.

=== Nursing Cadets ===
Pupils in Year 9 up until Year 13 can choose to be a member of the Nursing Cadets.

=== Young Enterprise ===
Pupils in Year 9 up until Year 13 can choose to be a member of the Young Enterprise.

=== Coding Club ===
Pupils in Year 7 up until Year 11 can choose to be a member of the Coding Club.

== Notable people ==
- Montagu Dawson (1919 – 2003), RAF group captain
- Alice Dearing (born 1997), swimmer
- Edward Gopsill (1921 – 2016), lieutenant colonel
- Gilbert Harding (1907 – 1960), broadcaster
- Eric Idle (born 1943), comedian
- Tully Kearney (born 1997), Paralympic gold medalist in swimming
- Michael Kidson (1929 – 2015), schoolmaster
- Kelly Massey (born 1985), Olympic 400m athlete
- Philip Oakes (1928 – 2005), journalist
- Matthew Richards (born 2002), Olympic gold medalist in swimming
- Tom Webster (1886–1962), cartoonist
