= Chris Baines =

British environmentalist and broadcaster

- Born: 4 May 1947 (age 79); Sheffield, West Riding of Yorkshire, England
- Known for: Environmentalist author, broadcaster, environmental campaigner

John Christopher Baines (born 4 May 1947) is an English naturalist. He is a horticulturalist, landscape architect, naturalist, television presenter and author, and advises governments and organisations on environmental issues.

Baines grew up in Sheffield, West Riding of Yorkshire. He worked in the local parks department when he left school, and then studied horticulture and landscape architecture at Wye College, University of London.

== Career ==
After an early career in landscape contracting, including several years of greening desert landscapes in the Middle East and community landscaping on UK inner-city housing estates, Baines taught landscape architecture at post-graduate level until 1986, when he was awarded an honorary personal professorship at Birmingham Polytechnic in Birmingham.

In 1980, he was one of a group of local environmentalists who co-founded the Urban Wildlife Group (now the Wildlife Trust for Birmingham and the Black Country), the first of a series of such urban conservation organisations to appear in the UK that year. This was the beginning of a burgeoning urban wildlife movement with which he has always had a close association, and he remains vice-president of the Wildlife Trust for Birmingham and the Black Country.

Through most of the late 1980s and early 1990s, Baines focused on television broadcasting, and presented The Big E, Saturday Starship, Pebble Mill at One and several other networked series. The BBC TV programme Countryfile evolved from his original regional series "Your Country Needs You" and Baines was one of Countryfile 's first presenters.

Baines built the first wildlife garden ever allowed at Chelsea Flower Show in 1985, and in the same year his television programme Bluetits and Bumblebees, and his book, How to Make a Wildlife Garden, inspired many people to begin gardening with wildlife.

The Wild Side of Town, which accompanied a five-part television series of the same name, won the U.K. Conservation Book Prize in 1987. His other books include four-story books for young children. His investigative environmental series for children, The Ark, won the International Wildscreen Award in 1987. Also in 1987, Chris recorded an album, The Wild Side of Town, with the folk-rock Albion Band and then toured the U.K., raising money for the British Wildlife Appeal.

In 2000, he presented Charlie's Wildlife Gardens with Charlie Dimmock.

Baines is one of the U.K.'s leading environmental campaigners, and in recent years he has particularly championed the cause of trees. He led the fight to prevent cable television and other utility companies chopping through the roots of urban street trees. He has also promoted the concept of urban forestry in the U.K. He was a founding member of the steering committee of CABE Space, the U.K. Government's urban greenspace adviser.

He was principal adviser to Trees of Time and Place, a campaign for the millennium which encouraged people to gather seeds from a favourite tree, grow a seedling and plant it for the future. He held a dawn chorus listening event in 1987 which would go on to become International Dawn Chorus Day. He was also a member of the steering board for the BBC's Breathing Places campaign.

Baines is committed to urban wildlife and wildlife gardening. He works from home in Wolverhampton, is a national vice-president of the Royal Society of Wildlife Trusts. He is a former trustee of the Heritage Lottery Fund and also completed a further five years as a member of the HLF Expert Panel. He is president of the Association for Environment Conscious Building and the Thames Estuary Partnership and the Essex Wildlife Trust. In 2004 he was presented with the RSPB's annual Medal of Honour for his contribution to nature conservation and sustainable water management. In 2013 he was presented with the coveted Peter Scott Award by the British Naturalists Association. He is the patron of the Countryside Management Association and the Wildlife Gardening Forum, and president of the Wildside Activity Centre. Baines is also a member of the National Trust's natural environment advisory group.

Baines works as a self-employed freelancer, and advises government ministers, local councils and senior executives in major water, minerals, finance, construction and housing companies, on environmental practice.

He is particularly active as a professional environmental adviser to the housebuilding and development industry in the UK. He chaired the independent design review panel for the largest new housing development in the Thames Gateway, East of London at Barking Riverside and he also advised on sustainability at the 2012 Olympic Athletes' Village and Westfield Shopping City in Stratford, East London. He advised on regeneration in the UN World Heritage city of Bath, Somerset, and in the new township of the Hamptons, Peterborough, and was retained by developers Lend Lease to advise on green infrastructure for the redevelopment of the Heygate Estate, Elephant and Castle. In 2017 that development was shortlisted for the Stirling prize. He has a particular interest in the environment of retirement housing and worked for several years as an adviser to specialist developer Beechcroft. He also advised the UK government's Department for Communities and Local Government (CLG) on biodiversity aspects of their proposed ecotowns. In 2010 he worked in the Gulf state of Qatar with the Boston Consulting Group, producing the twenty year forward strategy for that country's urban environments. In the 1990s he established the Greenleaf Housing Awards for the New Homes Marketing Board, and chaired the national judging panel for 15 years.

He has particular expertise in the field of sustainable water management. He has worked for a number of UK water companies, spent time as an adviser to the water regulator OFWAT and has worked with the Environment Agency to improve communication of whole river catchment management.

He also chairs National Grid plc's Stakeholder Advisory Group, whose role is to advise National Grid on candidate projects for application of funding under a mechanism put in place by Ofgem to reduce the visual impact of existing electricity transmission infrastructure in National Parks and Areas of Outstanding Natural Beauty.

Baines has written frequently in BBC Gardeners' World, BBC Wildlife and Country Living magazines. and is a regular broadcaster on BBC Radio 4. His film The Living Thames won the 2019 UK Charity Film Award and has won prizes and awards on four continents. It has an introduction by Sir David Attenborough and is available worldwide through Amazon. He is also a Companion of the Guild of St George.

== Television programmes ==
- BBC Gardeners' World 1979, 1981 and 1999
- Your Country Needs You 1988
- Grass Roots 1993–96
- Bluetits and Bumblebees 1985
- The Big E 1988
- Countryfile 1989–92
- Saturday Starship 1986
- Pebble Mill at One 1981–84
- The Ark 1987
- The Wild Side of Town 1987
- Under the Axe 1998
- Charlie's Wildlife Gardens 2000
- The Living Thames 2019

== Bibliography ==
(incomplete)

- New Pollution Handbook 1992
- A guide to habitat creation (with Jane Smart) ISBN 1-85341-031-4
- Wildlife Garden Handbook
- How to Make a Wildlife Garden (2000, 2nd revised edition). Frances Lincoln. ISBN 978-0711217119
- The Wild Side of Town Publ. 1986 by Elm Tree Books/Hamish Hamilton and BBC publications ISBN 0-241-11995-2 (Elm Tree Books) / ISBN 0-563-21312-4 (BBC) (hardback), ISBN 0-241-11942-1 (Elm Tree Books) / ISBN 0-563-21309-4 (BBC) (paperback)

Royal Horticultural Society Companion to Wildlife Gardening, 2015 (ISBN 9780711235472)

=== Children's books ===
- The Old Boot
- The Picnic
- The Flower
- The Nest

== Awards ==
- International Wildscreen Awards, winner of children's TV prize for The Ark, 1987
- Sir Peter Kent Conservation book prize for The Wild Side of Town, 1987
- Honorary Fellow, the Institute of Leisure and Amenity Management
- Honorary Fellow, the Chartered Institute of Water and Environmental Management
- Honorary personal chair, University of Central England
- Honorary Doctorate, Sheffield Hallam University
- Peter Scott Award, British Naturalists Association
- RSPB Medal for contribution to conservation

Winner, UK Charitable Film Awards as presenter of The Living Thames

- 2026, Victoria Medal of Honour, Royal Horticultural Society
