= 1966 Birthday Honours =

British government recognitions

The Queen's Birthday Honours 1966 were appointments in many of the Commonwealth realms of Queen Elizabeth II to various orders and honours to reward and highlight good works by citizens of those countries.

The appointments were made to celebrate the official birthday of The Queen. The announcement date varies from year to year. The 1966 Queen's Birthday Honours were announced on 11 June 1966 for the United Kingdom, Australia, New Zealand, Sierra Leone, Jamaica, Malawi, and The Gambia.

== United Kingdom and Commonwealth ==
=== Life Peer ===
Baroness

- Dame Evelyn Adelaide Sharp, GBE, lately Permanent Secretary, Ministry of Housing and Local Government.

Baron

- Peter Ritchie Calder, CBE, Professor of International Relations, University of Edinburgh.
- John Cooper, JP, General Secretary and Treasurer, National Union of General and Municipal Workers.
- Sir (Henry Cecil) John Hunt, CBE, DSO. For services to Youth.
- Sir William Hunter McFadzean, Chairman, British National Export Council.
- Arthur Moyle, CBE, JP, Member of Parliament for Stourbridge Division of Worcestershire, 1945–1950; and for Oldbury and Halesowen, 1950–1964. Parliamentary Private Secretary to the Right Honourable Clement Attlee, 1946–1955.

=== Privy Councillor ===
- The Honourable Charles Frederick Adermann, Minister for Primary Industry, Commonwealth of Australia since 1958.
- The Right Honourable George Rowland Stanley, Earl of Cromer, MBE, Governor of the Bank of England.
- George Darling, MP, Member of Parliament for Hillsborough Division of Sheffield since 1950. Minister of State, Board of Trade since 1964.
- Jennie Lee, MP, Member of Parliament for North Lanark, 1929–1931, and for the Cannock Division of Staffordshire since 1945. Parliamentary Secretary, Ministry of Public Building and Works, 1964–1965, and Parliamentary Under-Secretary of State, Department of Education and Science since 1965.
- The Honourable William McMahon, Treasurer, Commonwealth of Australia.
- The Honourable John Ross Marshall, Deputy Prime Minister of New Zealand, Minister of Industries and Commerce and Overseas Trade since 1960.

=== Knight Bachelor ===
- Arthur George Algeo, CBE. For public services in Northern Ireland.
- Roy George Douglas Allen, CBE, Professor of Statistics, University of London.
- Alderman John William Allitt, MBE. For political and public services in Derbyshire.
- Alderman George Astbury, JP. For political and public services in Cheshire.
- Charles Barratt, Town Clerk and Clerk of the Peace, City of Coventry.
- William Godfrey Cretney, Headmaster, The Regis School, Tettenhall, Staffordshire.
- Alexander Haddow, MD, Professor of Experimental Pathology, University of London and Director, Chester Beatty Research Institute, Institute of Cancer Research.
- Ian George Wilson Hill, CBE, TD, MB, FRCP.Ed, Professor of Medicine, Queen's College, Dundee, University of St. Andrews.
- John Denis Nelson Hill, MB, BS, Professor of Psychiatry, Middlesex Hospital Medical School, University of London.
- Derek Percy Hilton, MBE, President of the Law Society.
- Horace Edwin Holmes, DCM, Labour Member of Parliament for Hemsworth, 1946–1959. For political and public services in the West Riding of Yorkshire.
- Robert Hugh Le Masurier, DSC, Bailiff of Jersey.
- Norman Longley, CBE, Chairman, Construction Industry Training Board.
- Albert Victor Martin, CBE. For services to the National Health Service.
- Anthony Horace Milward, CBE, Chairman, British European Airways.
- Leslie Gordon Newton, Editor, The Financial Times.
- Anthony Edward Percival, CB, Secretary, Export Credits Guarantee Department.
- Lionel Pinnock Poole, JP. For political and public services in Northamptonshire.
- Alderman Frank Leslie Price. For political and public services in Birmingham.
- Joseph Richards, President of the Football League.
- Martin Ryle, Professor of Radio Astronomy, University of Cambridge.
- Frank Schon, Chairman and Managing Director, Marchon Products Ltd.
- William Kenneth Macleod Slimmings, CBE, Chairman, Board of Trade Advisory Committee.
- Hugh Charles Tett, Chairman, Esso Petroleum Company Ltd.
- Michael Kemp Tippett, CBE, Composer.
- Siegmund George Warburg, Director, S. G. Warburg & Co.
- Hugh Thomas Weeks, CMG. For services to Industry.
- Henry Weston Wells, CBE, Chairman, New Towns Commission.

State of New South Wales

- William Dobell, OBE. For services to Art, particularly as a landscape and portrait painter.
- William Theodore (Theo) Kelly, OBE. For services to commerce and industry.
- The Honourable Robert Christian Wilson, CMG. For services to primary industry.

State of Victoria

- Joseph Robert Archibald Glenn, OBE. For distinguished services, particularly as Chairman of the Interim Council, La Trobe University.
- Ross Grey-Smith, of South Yarra. For services to horse-racing, particularly as Chairman of the Victoria Racing Club.

State of Western Australia

- Eric Fleming Smart, OBE, a leading farmer and grazier.

State of Tasmania

- Douglas William Leigh Parker, OBE, MB, FRCS Ed., lately Director of Orthopaedic Services, Department of Health Services.

Commonwealth Relations

- Harvey Kincaid Stewart Lindsay, Managing Director, The Metal Box Company of India Limited.
- George Patrick Gordon Mackay, CBE, lately General Manager, East African Railways and Harbours.
- Charles Demoree Newbold, CMG, QC, President, East African Court of Appeal.

Overseas Territories

- Julian Darrell Bates, CMG, CVO, Permanent Secretary to the Government of Gibraltar.
- Courtenay Robert Latimer, CBE, Minister in charge of the Basutoland, Bechuanaland and Swaziland Section, British Embassy, Cape Town.
- Alberto Maria Rodrigues, CBE, MB, ED, JP. For services to the community in Hong Kong.
- Maurice Scott, CBE, DFC, Speaker, Legislative Council, Fiji.
- John Carter, QC. For public services in British Guiana.

=== Order of the Bath ===
==== Knight Grand Cross of the Order of the Bath (GCB) ====
Military Division

- General Sir Reginald Hackett Hewetson, KCB, CBE, DSO (40386), late Royal Regiment of Artillery, Colonel Commandant, Royal Regiment of Artillery and Army Physical Training Corps.

==== Knight Commander of the Order of the Bath (KCB) ====
Military Division

Royal Navy

- Vice-Admiral Hugh Stirling Mackenzie, CB, DSO*, DSC.
- Lieutenant General Norman Hastings Tailyour, CB, DSO*.

Army

- Major-General Richard Michael Power Carver, CB, CBE, DSO, MC (64649), late Royal Armoured Corps, Colonel Commandant, Corps of Royal Electrical and Mechanical Engineers.

Royal Air Force

- Acting Air Marshal Frederick Ernest Rosier, CB, CBE, DSO.
- Acting Air Marshal Denis Frank Spotswood, CB, CBE, DSO, DFC.

Civil Division

- Antony Alexander Part, CB, MBE, Permanent Secretary, Ministry of Public Building and Works.
- Matthew Stevenson, CB, CMG, Permanent Secretary, Ministry of Housing and Local Government.

==== Companion of the Order of the Bath (CB) ====
Military Division

Royal Navy

- Rear-Admiral Edward Beckwith Ashmore, DSC.
- Major-General Peter William Cradock Hellings, DSC, MC.
- Rear-Admiral Peter Norris Howes, DSC.
- Rear-Admiral Henry Hugh Hughes.
- Rear-Admiral Colin Duncan Madden, CBE, MVO, DSC.
- Major-General Nigel Harry Duncan McGill.
- Rear-Admiral Michael Patrick Pollock, MVO, DSC.
- Rear-Admiral Arthur Francis Turner, DSC.
- Rear-Admiral Rupert Charles Purchas Wainwright, DSC.

Army

- Major-General William Brian Francis Brennan, QHP, MB (52442), late Royal Army Medical Corps.
- Major-General Raymond Douglas Coate (41435), Royal Army Pay Corps.
- Major-General Napier Crookenden, DSO, OBE (66121), late Infantry.
- Major-General The Honourable Miles Francis Fitzalan Howard, CBE, MC (68110), late Foot Guards.
- Major-General Peter Bernard Gillett, OBE (62517), late Royal Regiment of Artillery.
- Major-General Godfrey John Hamilton, CBE, DSO (380636), late Infantry.
- Major-General The Viscount Monckton of Brenchley, OBE, MC (72764), late Royal Armoured Corps.
- Major-General Alan Neilson Moon, CBE, LDS (40175), late Royal Army Dental Corps.
- Major-General George Le Fevre Payne, CBE (52707), Royal Army Ordnance Corps.

Royal Air Force

- Air Vice-Marshal Robert Edward Craven, OBE, DFC.
- Air Vice-Marshal Keith Horace Gooding, OBE.
- Air Vice-Marshal John Hugh Lapsley, OBE, DFC, AFC.
- Air Vice-Marshal Graham Reese Magill, CBE, DFC.
- Air Vice-Marshal Christopher Neil Foxley-Norris, DSO, OBE.
- Air Commodore Edward James Morris, CBE, DSO, DFC.

Civil Division

- Norman Percy Allen, Chief Scientific Officer I, Superintendent, Metallurgy Division and Deputy Director, National Physical Laboratory, Ministry of Technology.
- Colonel George Sheldon Bayliss, OBE, TD, lately Chairman, Territorial and Auxiliary Forces Association for the County of Stafford.
- Lewis Rowland Beesly, Director General, Aircraft Production, Ministry of Aviation.
- Robert Donald Murray Bell, Under-Secretary, Scottish Development Department.
- Edward Clifford Cornford, Chief Scientist, Ministry of Defence (Army).
- Thomas Cameron Fraser, MBE, TD, Industrial Director, National Economic Development Council.
- Albert Norman Harrison, CVO, OBE, lately Director of Naval Construction, Ministry of Defence (Royal Navy).
- Stephen Charles Hawtrey, Clerk of the Journals, House of Commons.
- Charles Peter Scott-Malden, Under-Secretary, Ministry of Transport.
- Stanley Paul Osmond, Third Secretary, HM Treasury.
- Geoffrey Parker, Under-Secretary, Board of Trade.
- Godfrey Martin Ellis Paulson, CMG, OBE, Grade 3 Officer, Foreign Office.
- Norman Singleton, Under-Secretary, Ministry of Labour.
- William Thomas Charles Skyrme, CBE, TD, Secretary of Commissions, Lord Chancellor's Office.
- Arthur Roy Slyth, OBE, Secretary, Exchequer and Audit Department.

=== Order of Saint Michael and Saint George ===
==== Knight Grand Cross of the Order of St Michael and St George (GCMG) ====
- Sir Norman Victor Kipping, KBE, formerly Director-General, Federation of British Industries.

==== Knight Commander of the Order of St Michael and St George (KCMG) ====
- Sir Stanley Unwin, Chairman, George Allen and Unwin Ltd.
- Frederick Blackmore Arnold, CMG, OBE, Minister (Commercial), British High Commission, Canberra.
- Cyril Stanley Pickard, CMG, British High Commissioner, Karachi.
- Michael Norman Francis Stewart, CMG, OBE, Minister, Her Majesty's Embassy, Washington.
- Frank Stanley Tomlinson, CMG, British High Commissioner, Colombo.

State of Victoria

- The Honourable Sir Henry Arthur Winneke, OBE, Chief Justice of the Supreme Court.

Colonial Office

- James Carnegie McPetrie, CMG, OBE, Legal Adviser, Colonial Office.

==== Companion of the Order of St Michael and St George (CMG) ====
- Thomas Cecil Garside James, Assistant Secretary, Headquarters Far East Air Force, Ministry of Defence (Royal Air Force).
- Lucius Perronet Thompson-McCausland, lately Adviser to the Governor of the Bank of England.
- Arthur Keith Pallot, Director of Finance and Establishments and Assistant Secretary, Commonwealth War Graves Commission.
- Edward Tenney Caswell Spooner, MD, FRCP, Dean of the London School of Hygiene & Tropical Medicine.
- Derick Rosslyn Ashe, Counsellor, Her Majesty's Embassy, Havana.
- Ian Fowler Baillie, OBE, British Agent and Assistant High Commissioner, Aden.
- Denys Downing Brown, MM, Foreign Office.
- Ronald Arthur Burroughs, Counsellor, Her Majesty's Embassy, Lisbon.
- Rohan D'Olier Butler, Foreign Office.
- Donovan Harold Clibborn, Counsellor, Her Majesty's Embassy, Rio de Janeiro.
- Solomon Joseph Gross, Counsellor (Economic and Commercial), British High Commission, Accra.
- Reginald Alfred Hibbert, Chargé d'Affaires, Her Majesty's Embassy, Ulan Bator.
- Herbert John Hinchey, GBE, lately Financial Secretary, East African Common Services Organisation.
- Clifford Norman Jupp, Counsellor (Economic and Commercial), Her Majesty's Embassy, Belgrade.
- Arthur William Kent, OBE, lately Treasurer, Nairobi City Council, Kenya.
- William Arnold Knight, OBE, Controller and Auditor-General, Uganda.
- Leslie Alfred Marsden, Commissioner of Police, Nigeria.
- Alan Michell, Foreign Office.
- John Oscar Moreton, MC, Commonwealth Relations Office.
- Hugh Travers Morgan, Counsellor, Office of the Deputy Commandant, British Military Government, Berlin.
- James Murray, Counsellor, Her Majesty's Embassy, Djakarta.
- Humphrey Leslie Malcolm Oxley, OBE, Commonwealth Relations Office.
- Arthur Michael Palliser, lately Foreign Office.
- Frederick Nigel Moliere Pusinelli, OBE, MC, Director of Establishments and Assistant High Commissioner (Supernumerary), Aden.
- Richard Seymour, CBE, British Council Representative, Germany.
- Howard Frank Trayton Smith, Foreign Office.
- John Edmund Dudley Street, Foreign Office.
- Nigel Clive Cosby Trench, Counsellor, Her Majesty's Embassy, Washington.
- Henry Aloysius Twist, OBE, Commonwealth Relations Office.
- Ivor Francis Sutherland Vincent, MBE, Diplomatic Service Administration Office.
- George Pritchard Harvey Wilson, JP, President of the Royal Agricultural Society of Victoria.

State of Queensland

- Reginald Basil McAllister, CVO, Under Secretary, Premier's Department.

State of Western Australia

- Frank William Edward Tydeman, CIE, lately General Manager and Chief Engineer, Freemantle Port Authority.

Colonial Office

- James Anthony Allison, OBE, Senior Permanent Secretary, Ministry of Home Affairs, Bechuanaland.
- Archibald Campbell, Assistant Secretary, Colonial Office.
- John Alfred Cumber, MBE, TD, Administrator, Cayman Islands.
- The Right Reverend Ronald Owen Hall, MC, Bishop of Hong Kong and Macao.
- Gordon Matthews Hector, CBE, Deputy British Government Representative, Basutoland.
- David James Gardiner Rose, CVO, MBE, Administrator, Antigua.
- Martin Samuel Stavely, CVO, CBE, Administrator, British Virgin Islands.

British Guiana

- James Albert Sholto Douglas, Permanent Secretary, Ministry of Home Affairs, British Guiana.
- Shridath Surendranath Ramphal, QC, Attorney-General, British Guiana.

=== Royal Victorian Order ===
==== Knight Commander of the Royal Victorian Order (KCVO) ====
- Captain Kenneth Lachlan Mackintosh, Royal Navy (Retired).
- John Lovegrove Waldron, CVO.

==== Commander of the Royal Victorian Order (CVO) ====
- Major-General Arthur Reginald Chater, CB, DSO, OBE.
- The Right Honourable Ruth Sylvia, Dowager Baroness Fermoy, OBE.
- Lieutenant-Colonel Villiers Archer John Heald, DSO, MBE, MC.
- Lieutenant-Colonel John Mansel Miller, DSO, MC.
- Derek Jack Mitchell.
- Douglas Williams.

==== Member of the Royal Victorian Order, 4th class (MVO) ====
- Commander Gerrard John Michael Andrewes, Royal Navy.
- Thomas James Barnham, MVO.
- Francis Edward Ernest Fox.
- George Albert Harris, MVO, MBE.
- Patricia Heaton.
- The Reverend Christopher Hildyard.
- Captain David John McMicking, The Black Watch (Royal Highland Regiment).
- John Edward Powis Titman, MVO.
- Geoffrey Lawrence Walker.

==== Member of the Royal Victorian Order, 5th class (MVO) ====
- Roy Francis Henry Adams.
- Harry Carter.
- Mary Veronica Dunlop.
- Robert Charles Marrington.
- Stuart Charles Brandon Parker.
- Doris Ellen Pett, MBE.
- Regimental Sergeant-Major Gerald Stone, MBE, Irish Guards.
- Sheila Mary Wells.

==== Medal of the Royal Victorian Order (RVM) ====
- Chief Petty Officer Steward Geoffrey Connell, P/LX 885349.
- Jack Cutts.
- Mechanician 1st Class Alfred Ernest Elton, P/KX 97773.
- Percy William Gale.
- Yeoman Bed Goer Walter Edward Hawkins, MBE. Her Majesty's Bodyguard of the Yeomen of the Guard.
- Percy John Laming.
- Walter Gerald Nicholson.
- Percy Edward Platt.
- Elsie Constance Smith.
- Muriel Alice Tate.

=== Order of the British Empire ===
==== Knight Grand Cross of the Order of the British Empire (GBE) ====
Military Division

- Admiral Sir John Graham Hamilton, KBE, CB.

==== Knight Commander of the Order of the British Empire (KBE) ====
Military Division

Royal Navy

- Vice-Admiral Hugh Colenso Martell, CB, CBE.

Army

- Major-General Leonard Henry Atkinson, OBE (67491), Corps of Royal Electrical and Mechanical Engineers.
- Lieutenant-General (temporary) John Francis Worsley, CB, OBE, MC (380190), late Infantry.

Royal Air Force

- Acting Air Marshal Reginald Herbert Embleton Emson, CB, CBE, AFC.

Civil Division

- James Mackerron Mackay, CB, Deputy Secretary, Ministry of Aviation.
- Major-General Sir Kenneth William Dobson Strong, CB, OBE, Director-General of Intelligence, Ministry of Defence.
- Charles Reginald Wheeler, CBE, Chairman, Associated Electrical Industries, Ltd. For services to Export.
- Robert Spencer Isaacson, CMG, Her Majesty's Ambassador Extraordinary and Plenipotentiary at Berne.

State of Queensland

- The Honourable Thomas Alfred Hiley, lately Deputy Premier.

Colonial Office

- Sir Hallam Grey Massiah, CBE, MD, CM. For public services in Barbados.

==== Dame Commander of the Order of the British Empire (DBE) ====
Military Division

Royal Air Force

- Air Commandant Felicity Barbara Hill, OBE, Women's Royal Air Force.

Civil Division

- Ruth Railton, OBE. For services to Music.
- Alderman Grace Tebbutt, CBE. For political and public services in Sheffield.
- Mabel Tylecote. For political and public services in Manchester.

==== Commander of the Order of the British Empire (CBE) ====
Military Division

Royal Navy

- Captain Robert Rowland Hill Boddy.
- Commander John Guy Brisker, OBE, RD, (now Retired).
- Instructor Captain Gordon Berry Cowley Britton, ADC.
- Captain Hubert George Carkeet, Royal Fleet Auxiliary Service.
- Commodore Sir John Dutton Clerk, Bt., VRD, DL, Royal Naval Reserve.
- Captain John Rae McKaig.

Army

- Colonel John Bunting, TD, MB, FRCS (171582), Royal Army Medical Corps, Territorial Army (now Territorial Army Reserve of Officers).
- Brigadier (local) Edward Grismond Beaumont Davies-Scourfield, MBE, MC (77674), late Infantry, formerly Commander, British Joint Services Team, Ghana.
- Brigadier Robert Leonard France, MC (63538), late Corps of Royal Engineers.
- Brigadier Leslie Edward Hayward (281341), Army Catering Corps.
- Brigadier (temporary) Michael Walter Holme, OBE, MC (117134), late Infantry.
- Colonel Mabel Dorothy Milbourn Humphery (192725), Women's Royal Army Corps.
- Brigadier William Albert Kenney, OBE, ADC (134022), Royal Army Ordnance Corps.
- Brigadier John Douglas King-Martin, DSO, MC (378783), late Royal Regiment of Artillery.
- Brigadier (temporary) Charles Allsop Morris (143529), late Infantry.
- Colonel Bevil Charles Alan Napier, OBE, MC (85692), late Infantry.
- Colonel John Stephen Lanchester O'Neill, DSO (70710), late Royal Regiment of Artillery.
- Brigadier Etienne Lionel Heriz Smith, MBE, MC (63539), late Corps of Royal Engineers.
- Colonel George Henderson Starr (62548), late Royal Corps of Signals (now retired).
- The Reverend Patrick Tobin, Chaplain to the Forces First Class (136157), Royal Army Chaplains' Department.

Royal Air Force

- Air Commodore Charles Douglas Tomalin, OBE, DFC, AFC.
- Acting Air Commodore Peter Arden Hughes, DFC.
- Acting Air Commodore Alastair Cavendish Lindsay Mackie, DFC.
- Group Captain Robert Cross, LRCP&S, DTM&H.
- Group Captain Wilfrid Allen Lance Davis, DFC, AFC, (Retired).
- Group Captain Roy Gilbert Dutton, DSO, DFC, ADC.
- Group Captain John William Frost, DFC.
- Group Captain Charles Melvin Gibbs, OBE, DFC.
- Group Captain Gordon Maxwell McMinn.
- Group Captain Henry Holt Mayoh.
- Group Captain Clifford Pattison.

Civil Division

- Harry (Henry Fleetwood) Andrews, Actor.
- George Thomas Baney, Senior Principal Inspector of Taxes, Board of Inland Revenue.
- Hazel Barkley, Assistant Secretary, Board of Trade.
- Charles Harold Barry, HM Divisional Inspector of Schools, Department of Education and Science.
- Graham Reginald Beeston, MBE, Chairman, Council for Wales and Monmouthshire.
- John Tristram Beresford. For services to Agriculture.
- Henry Roy Pratt Boorman, MBE, Chairman and Editor-in-Chief, Kent Messenger Group.
- Francis William Rogers Brambell, Lloyd Roberts Professor of Zoology, University College of North Wales, Bangor.
- Percy Briggs, Full-time Member, Electricity Council.
- John Gilbert Newton Brown, Publisher, Oxford University Press.
- George Walter Wycliffe Browne, Lately Assistant Secretary, Department of Education and Science.
- Alderman Jessie Burgess, JP. For political and public services in Camberwell.
- Alderman Clara Joyce Burt. For political and public services in Lancaster.
- Alderman William Holt Butcher. For political and public services in Exeter.
- Hilton Cecil Calpine, MBE, Director of Operational Analysis (Royal Navy), Ministry of Defence.
- The Right Honourable William Francis, Baron Carew, National Chairman, British Legion.
- Professor William Fisher Cassie. For services to Civil Engineering.
- James Reid Clark, Director of Education, City of Aberdeen.
- Zebedee Thomas Claro, MVO, OBE, Assistant Secretary (Chief Conciliation Officer), Ministry of Labour.
- William Henry Morton Clifford, Assistant Solicitor, Ministry of Pensions and National Insurance.
- Ralph Hedworth Clough, OBE, Deputy Chief Inspector of Mines and Quarries, Ministry of Power.
- Christopher Sydney Cockerell, Consultant, Hovercraft Development Ltd.
- John Frederick Colquhoun, OBE. For services to the Boy Scouts Association.
- Robert Cruickshank, MD, FRCP, Professor of Bacteriology, University of Edinburgh.
- Alan Meredyth Hudson Davies, OBE, Chairman, Advisory Committee for Management Efficiency in the National Health Service.
- David John Davies. For political and public services in Cardiganshire.
- Evelyn Joyce Denington, Chairman, Housing Committee, Greater London Council.
- Alderman Cameron Doodson, Chairman, Highways and Bridges Committee, Lancashire County Council.
- Charles Mclnryre Douglas, Inspector-General of Waterguard, Board of Customs and Excise.
- Ellice Aylmer Eadie, Deputy Parliamentary Counsel.
- Winston Godward Edmonds, ERD, Managing Director, Manchester Ship Canal Company.
- Robert Arthur Elliott, TD, Deputy Chief Engineer, Ministry of Housing and Local Government.
- Ronald McLeod Fairfield, Deputy Chairman and Managing Director, British Insulated Callender's Cables Ltd. For services to Export.
- Donald Vivian Thomas Fairrie, Secretary, Public Health Laboratory Service Board, Ministry of Health.
- Professor Reginald Brettauer Fisher. For services to the Ministry of Defence.
- Ronald Everett Glover, FRCVS, Member, Agricultural Research Council.
- Kathleen Olivia Gordon, Director, The Royal Academy of Dancing.
- Freda Howitt Gwilliam, OBE, Woman Educational Adviser, Ministry of Overseas Development.
- Richard Sidney Colchester Hall, General Manager, Publications, British Broadcasting Corporation.
- James William Harper. For political and public services in Northumberland.
- Richard Arthur Hayward, Secretary-General, Staff Side, Civil Service National Whitley Council.
- Herbert Gerald Henly, Chairman of Council, The Motor and Cycle Trades Benevolent Fund.
- Richard Hoyle, JP. For political and public services in Yorkshire.
- Douglas Vernon Hubble, MD, FRCP, Professor of Paediatrics and Child Health, and Dean, Faculty of Medicine, University of Birmingham.
- William Theodore Jackson, MBE, Director, Home Services, Ministry of Public Building and Works.
- William James, Partner, Crosher and James, Quantity Surveyors.
- Alderman Arthur Jones, JP. For political and public services in Flintshire.
- Clifford Kenyon, JP, MP, Member of Parliament for the Chorley Division of Lancashire since 1945. Chairman, House of Commons Committee of Selection since November 1964. For political and public services.
- James Patrick Kinsley, Registrar, Principal Probate Registry, Supreme Court of Judicature.
- Hans Kronberger, OBE, Scientist-in-Chief, Reactor Group, United Kingdom Atomic Energy Authority, Risley.
- Alderman Bernard Sydney Langton. For services in Police administration.
- Elsie Gertrude Mary Linecar, Headmistress, Four Dwellings Secondary Girls' School, Birmingham.
- Alfred Cyril Lovesey, OBE, Deputy Director of Engineering, Rolls-Royce Ltd.
- John McCann, MP, Member of Parliament for Rochdale since 1958. A Lord Commissioner of HM Treasury and Government Whip, October 1964–March 1966; Vice-Chamberlain of HM Household since March 1966. For political and public services.
- Alderman Ernest Alfred Machin, JP. For political and public services in Blackpool.
- Frederick Edward McWilliam, Sculptor.
- Desmond Walter Molins, Chairman and Managing Director, Molins Machine Company Ltd. For services to Export.
- George Frederick Morris, Inspector-General, Bankruptcy and Companies Liquidation, Board of Trade.
- John Hidalgo Moya, Architect.
- Arthur Gordon Norman, DFC, Chairman, The De La Rue Company Ltd. For services to Export.
- Joseph O'Hagan, OBE, Chairman, Trades Union Congress General Council. General Secretary, National Union of Blastfurnacemen, Ore Miners, Coke Workers and Kindred Trades.
- Niel Gunn Crosfield Pearson, MBE, Partner, March, Pearson and Green, Solicitors.
- Roger Ernest Peers, Secretary, King Edward's Hospital Fund for London.
- Victor Albert Peers, MBE, Director and General Manager, Granada Television Network Ltd.
- Harold Pinter, Playwright.
- Arthur James Platt, OBE, Assistant Secretary, HM Treasury.
- Kenneth Harry Platt, MBE, Secretary, Institution of Mechanical Engineers.
- Cyril George Francis Pritchett, Executive Director, Chloride Electrical Storage Company Ltd.
- John Francis Warre Rathbone, TD, Secretary, National Trust for Places of Historic Interest or Natural Beauty.
- Donald Andrew Gladstone Reid, Principal, Brixton School of Building.
- David Rhydderch, JP. For political and public services in Birmingham.
- Harold Robert Norman Rickett, TD, lately Chairman, Committee of Management, Henley Royal Regatta.
- William Meilir Lloyd Roberts, Chief Engineer, Metropolitan Water Board.
- Herman Rutherford, Chief Constable of Surrey.
- Peter Richard Henry Sellers, Actor.
- Amy Shuard, Singer.
- Eliot Trevor Oakeshott Slater, MD, FRCP, Director, Medical Research Council Psychiatric Genetics Research Unit.
- Professor Reuben Jacob Smeed, lately Deputy Director, Traffic and Safety Division, Road Research Laboratory, Ministry of Transport.
- Arnold Sorsby, MD, FRCS, Research Professor in Ophthalmology, Royal College of Surgeons.
- Sidney John Ernest Southgate, Executive Director, Commonwealth Sugar Exporters, London Liaison Office.
- Maurice Stacey, Mason Professor of Chemistry and Head of Department, Dean of the Faculty of Science and Engineering, University of Birmingham.
- John Martin Strang, JP, Chairman and Managing Director, Barr and Stroud, Ltd.
- Harold Joseph Taylor, Chief Director, Prison Department, Home Office,
- Ieuan Thomas, Director, Infestation Control Laboratory, Ministry of Agriculture, Fisheries and Food.
- Gavin Leonard Bourdas Thurston, Honorary Secretary, Coroners Society of England and Wales.
- John Van Geest, Chairman and Joint Managing Director, Geest Industries Ltd.

Diplomatic Service

- Hugh Charles Granger Brown, DSC, British subject resident in Pakistan.
- William Herbert Earle, British Council Representative, India.
- Robert Fell, lately Counsellor (Commercial), British High Commission, New Delhi.
- Frederick Thomas Hamblin, British subject resident in Germany.
- Peter William Hewett, MBE, MC, British subject resident in Japan.
- Brian Charles MacDermot, MVO, Her Majesty's Consul-General, Oporto.
- Alastair George Maitland, Her Majesty's Consul-General, Cleveland.
- Charles Robert Sinden Manders, Counsellor (Scientific), Her Majesty's Embassy, Tokyo.
- Paul Rex Marriott, British subject lately resident in Ghana.
- Professor Hugh Vivian Morgan, MB, BCh, British subject resident in the Sudan.
- James Louis Pembroke, OBE, lately Commissioner of Income Tax, East African Common Services Organisation.
- Captain Eric Victor Scullard, British subject resident in the Argentine Republic.
- Frank Ricardo Wardrop, Adviser to the General Manager, National Electricity Board, Malaysia.
- George Michael Warr, Her Majesty's Consul-General, Istanbul.
- Edmund John Kennedy Wicksteed, Resident, West Coast, Sabah, Malaysia.
- Kenneth Martin Wilcox, OBE, British subject resident in India.
- Jeffrey Frank Cuthbert Williams, lately Chief Ports Manager, East African Railways and Harbours.
- John Hurrell Collier-Wright, lately Chief Commercial Superintendent, East African Railways and Harbours.

Colonial Office

- Jeffrey Carlton Astwood, OBE, ED. For public services in Bermuda.
- Ratu Edward Cakobau, OBE, MC, ED, Administrative Officer Class I, Fiji.
- Massey Desmond Ffrench-Mullen, Director of Agriculture, Mauritius.
- Adrian Ernest Forsyth-Thompson, Development Secretary, Seychelles.
- Alan George Tilbury, OBE, Attorney-General, Bechuanaland.

State of New South Wales

- Geoffrey Innes Davey. For services to engineering and the community.
- John Hedley Douglas Marks. For services to commerce and to community organisations.
- Alderman Frank Outen Jensen Purdue. For services to the community, particularly as Lord Mayor of Newcastle.

State of Victoria

- Alfred Burdett Mellor, Chairman of the Melbourne Stock Exchange.
- Charles Wiffin Simmonds, lately President of the Melbourne Cricket Club.

State of Queensland

- Alexis Eric Francis Shaw, MB, BS, Director, Queensland Division, Australian Red Cross Blood Transfusion Service.
- Ronald Newman Witham, of Gympie. For services to local government and community welfare.

State of Western Australia

- Frederick Alexander, Professor of Modern History and Head of the Department of History, University of Western Australia.
- Cyril Gore Hammond. For services to the Secretarial and Accountancy profession and to commerce.

==== Officer of the Order of the British Empire (OBE) ====
Military Division

Royal Navy

- Chief Officer Margery Rylance Bammant, Women's Royal Naval Service.
- Surgeon Commander Alexander Fraser Davidson, MB, ChB.
- Commander Bernard John Faragher, VRD, Royal Naval Reserve.
- Commander Ronald Bertram Horner.
- Commander John Fielder House, DSC.
- Commander Owen George Jenkins, DSC.
- Acting Captain Robert William Kego.
- Commander Peter Neville King.
- Commander William Turner Lock.
- Commander Dennis John Long.
- Commander John Robert Manning.
- Lieutenant-Colonel Robin Jullian McGarel-Groves, Royal Marines.
- Acting Captain Timothy Capel Meyrick, DSC.
- Instructor Commander Michael Moreland.
- Commander Bryan John Straker.
- The Reverend Donald Young.

Army

- Lieutenant-Colonel Frank George Barber (170480), The Northamptonshire Regiment, Territorial Army.
- Lieutenant-Colonel (acting) Harry William James Caswill, MBE, ERD, DL (65898), Army Cadet Force.
- Lieutenant-Colonel Henry William Donald Cottam (94738), Royal Regiment of Artillery.
- Lieutenant-Colonel Hubert Jack Cox, TD (176067), Combined Cadet Force.
- Lieutenant-Colonel Timothy May Creasey (350206), The Royal Anglian Regiment.
- Lieutenant-Colonel Arnold William Rivers Currie (261632), The Royal Scots (The Royal Regiment).
- Colonel Alan Francis Daborn, TD (320279), late Infantry, Territorial Army.
- Lieutenant-Colonel Henry William John Dabson (226677), Royal Corps of Transport.
- Lieutenant-Colonel Gerald Goulding Drew, TD (186248), The Wiltshire Regiment (Duke of Edinburgh's), Territorial Army (now Territorial Army Reserve of Officers).
- Brigadier (temporary) Antony John Dyball, MC, TD (90507), late Infantry.
- Lieutenant-Colonel Derek Brereton Emley (203600), Royal Corps of Signals.
- Lieutenant-Colonel (temporary) Robin Clive Gardiner-Hill (343327), Corps of Royal Engineers.
- Brevet Lieutenant-Colonel and Lieutenant-Colonel (temporary) Laurie William Albert Gingell, MBE (283239), Royal Tank Regiment, Royal Armoured Corps.
- Colonel (local) John Samuel Greene, MC (66419), The Royal Anglian Regiment (Employed List 1).
- Lieutenant-Colonel James Mayo Alastair Gunn, TD (354361), Royal Regiment of Artillery, Territorial Army.
- Lieutenant-Colonel Sir William Edward Jardine of Applegirth, Bt., TD (91444), The King's Own Scottish Borderers, Territorial Army.
- Lieutenant-Colonel Humphrey Gurdon Kemball, MC (95490), The Lancashire Regiment (Prince of Wales's Volunteers) (Employed List 1), formerly Federal Regular Army.
- The Reverend Kenneth Ernest Kendra (366015), Chaplain to the Forces Second Class, Royal Army Chaplains' Department.
- Lieutenant-Colonel (Staff Quartermaster) Thomas Gerard Laidler (159774), Royal Corps of Transport (Employed List 2).
- Lieutenant-Colonel John Laurence-Smith (384584), Royal Tank Regiment, Royal Armoured Corps.
- Lieutenant-Colonel Rowland Spencer Noel Mans, MBE (112882), The Queen's Royal Surrey Regiment (Employed List 1).
- Lieutenant-Colonel and Staff Paymaster, First Class, Douglas Hall Millington (301265), Royal Army Pay Corps.
- Lieutenant-Colonel Kenneth Norman Orrell (235536), Corps of Royal Engineers.
- Lieutenant-Colonel Oliver Jasper Peck (217318), Royal Corps of Signals.
- Lieutenant-Colonel John Henry Peyton-Jones, MBE (85547), Royal Regiment of Artillery.
- Lieutenant-Colonel (Quartermaster) James William Pike (260400), Corps of Royal Engineers.
- Lieutenant-Colonel William Arthur Prowse, TD (45343), General List, Army Emergency Reserve.
- Lieutenant-Colonel Derrick John Sutton, MBE (338900), Royal Corps of Transport.
- Colonel (local) William Douglas Mackenzie Webb (212858), Royal Regiment of Artillery.
- Lieutenant-Colonel Roger West, TD, MRCS, LRCP (159750), Royal Army Medical Corps, Territorial Army.

Royal Air Force

- Wing Commander Paul Barber, DFC (129476).
- Wing Commander Victor Numa Cramer, (199537).
- Wing Commander William Allan Crawford, MB, ChB (203491).
- Wing Commander John Ivor Spencer Digman, DFC (152522).
- Wing Commander Desmond Martin Fanning, MB, BS (502897).
- Wing Commander John William Gilvey (173766).
- Wing Commander James Anthony Hope, DFC (111768).
- Wing Commander Richard Levente (199325).
- Wing Commander Desmond John Lynch, MBE (46452).
- Wing Commander Eric Lancelot Macro (33515).
- Wing Commander Horace Archibald John Mills (50719).
- Wing Commander James Wilson Pettigrew (54573), (for services with the British Joint Services Training Team, Ghana).
- Wing Commander Peter Vaughan Pledger (3053959).
- Wing Commander William John Pope (49517).
- Wing Commander John Humphries Ramsden (49521).
- Wing Commander Arthur Potter Stevens, MBE (59743).
- Wing Commander Foster Malcolm Neill Taplin (59237).
- Acting Wing Commander Jefferies Roy Davies (176304), Royal Air Force Volunteer Reserve (Training Branch).
- Squadron Leader Frederick David Gibson Clark (583188).

Civil Division

- Harold William Kennedy Acheson, MB, ChB, General medical practitioner, Stoke-on-Trent.
- Robert Hugh Allan, MBE, Chairman, Newcastle, Hexham and District War Pensions Committee.
- James Amos, Higher Collector, Board of Customs and Excise.
- Captain Donald Anderson, Senior Captain, First Class VC10 Flight (Flight Operations), British Overseas Airways Corporation.
- Lionel Victor Andrews, Deputy General Secretary, Union of Post Office Workers.
- Alderman Henry Seymour Armitage, JP. For public services in Stretford.
- Archibald Morton Ballantyne, TD, Secretary, Royal Aeronautical Society.
- Edward Barker, Chief Constable, Sheffield City Police.
- Leonard Richard Barker, Principal Inspector of Taxes, Board of Inland Revenue.
- Herbert George Harold Barratt, Member, Economic Development Committees for the Electrical and Mechanical Engineering Industries.
- Richard Horace Barrett, MRCS, LRCP, Senior Medical Officer, Ministry of Health.
- Lilian Janet Barry, lately President, Girls' Friendly Society and Townsend Fellowship.
- Captain Oswald Robert Bates, Commander, HMTS Monarch, General Post Office.
- Eric Worsley Battersby, MBE, Principal, Diplomatic Service Administration Office.
- Thomas Rodgers Bayston, lately Chairman, now Member, East Riding of Yorkshire Agricultural Executive Committee.
- John Measham Berncastle, lately Senior Estate Officer, Ministry of Housing and Local Government.
- George James Blackborow, Assistant Chief Constable, Birmingham City Police.
- Elfrieden Bloom, Chairman, The National Deaf Children's Society.
- Patrick Bolger, Councillor, Thurrock Urban District Council, Essex.
- John Leslie Bowen, MC, Senior Legal Assistant, Board of Customs and Excise.
- Wilfred Bown. For political and public services in Leicestershire.
- Ray Boyfield, formerly Secretary, Organisation Department, Trades Union Congress.
- Ernald George Brentnall, BEM, Chief Signal and Telecommunications Engineer, London Midland Region, British Railways Board.
- Walter Edward Brind, Secretary, Customs Annuity and Benevolent Fund Incorporated (The Customs Fund).
- Frederick John Broomfield, Principal, Board of Trade.
- Colin Brown, JP. For legal services in connection with mentally handicapped people in Scotland.
- Frederick William Bullion. For political and public services in Deptford.
- Philip Alexander Bundy, Finance Director, Production Group, United Kingdom Atomic Energy Authority, Risley.
- Gerald Burkinshaw, Town Clerk Chester.
- Patrick Sarsfield Byrne, MB, ChB, General medical practitioner, Westmorland.
- Leslie George Cartwright. For services to boys' clubs in Birmingham.
- Charles Douglas Chilton, MB, ChB, General medical practitioner, London E.11.
- Captain Norman Clarke, lately Senior Master, SS Capisteria, Shell Tankers (U.K.) Ltd.
- Gervas Charles Wells-Cole, FRCS, JP, lately Chairman, Lincoln No. 1 Hospital Management Committee.
- Patrick Connor, Regional Officer for Scotland and North West England, Amalgamated Engineering Union.
- Clive Randall Cook, Principal Scientific Officer, Government Communications Headquarters.
- John Royds Culshaw, Classical Recording Director, The Decca Record Company Ltd.
- Herbert Edward Cushnie, MBE, JP, lately Chairman, Brighton, Hove and District Local Employment Committee.
- Thomas Walter Dalgleish. For services to Forestry in Scotland.
- John Dalglish, lately Chairman and Managing Director, John Dalglish and Sons Ltd. For services to Export.
- Richard Lloyd Davies, lately Chairman, Anglesey Agricultural Executive Committee.
- Kenneth Frederick Grace Day, Clerk to the Birmingham National Health Service Executive Council.
- Jack Henry Devey, Grade 1 Officer, Ministry of Labour.
- Alexander Ironside Dickie. For services to Rugby Union Football.
- John Henry Dobson, Deputy Finance Officer, Headquarters, London, National Assistance Board.
- William Rutherford Docherty, Sheriff Clerk of Lanarkshire.
- Colonel Gerald Irving Anthony Dare Draper. For services to International Law.
- Samuel Robert Drinkwater, Honorary Secretary, Birmingham and District Branch, Royal Life Saving Society, United Kingdom.
- John Drummond, Chief Executive Officer, Ministry of Pensions and National Insurance.
- William George Kenneth Duncan, Principal Officer, Ministry of Health and Social Services for Northern Ireland.
- George Edwards, Superintending. Valuer, Board of Inland Revenue.
- Alderman Lilian Fallaize, JP, For political and public services in Ilford.
- Neville Jackson Feather. For services to the Falmouth Seagoing Training Ship for Boys.
- Philip Inston Fellows, DSC, Head of Exhibitions Division, Council of Industrial Design.
- Harold Ernest Francis, Deputy Regional Director, London Telecommunications Region, General Post Office.
- Thomas John Freyne, Chairman, Industrial Life Offices Association
- Thomas Peter Frost, Chief Test Pilot and Manager, Flight Operations, Bristol Siddeley Engines Ltd.
- John Morel Gibbs. For public services in Penarth.
- Wesley John Gillingham, Secretary, Northern Ireland Hospitals Authority.
- Harry Golombek. For services to Chess.
- Raymond William Gough, Chief Executive Officer (Ordnance Survey), Ministry of Land and Natural Resources.
- Charles Henry Hall. For political and public services in Manchester.
- Norman Charles Harvey, Chief Executive Officer, HM Treasury.
- Agatha Melanie Headlam, Grade 5 Officer, HM Diplomatic Service.
- Lieutenant-Colonel James Hamilton Hicks, TD, Member, Territorial and Auxiliary Forces Association for the Counties of Renfrew and Bute.
- Walter Hicks, Treasurer, Gelligaer Urban District Council (Glamorgan) and Financial Adviser to the Urban District Councils Association.
- Dennis Frederick Hodsdon, Assistant General Secretary, National Union of Agricultural Workers.
- John Benson Holliday, Chairman, Cumberland Agricultural Executive Committee.
- William Leonard Charles Honey, Chief Executive Officer, Ministry of Transport.
- Charles Stanley Hudson, Senior Principal Scientific Officer, Royal Aircraft Establishment, Ministry of Aviation.
- Alderman William Douglas Hughes. For political and public services in Carmarthenshire.
- Albert Maurice Humby. For services to the British Joint Communications Electronics Board.
- Robert Bell Hunter, Director of Education, County Londonderry.
- Anna Eliane Instone, Head of Gramophone Programmes, British Broadcasting Corporation.
- Sidney Charles Ireland, MBE, Editor of Debates, House of Lords.
- Frank Arthur Jackman. Joint Managing Director, Carless, Capel and Leonard, Ltd.
- Arthur Leslie James, formerly Editor, Evening Gazette, Middlesbrough. Now Editorial Consultant.
- Robert Jeffrey, Principal Scientific Officer, Safety in Mines Research Establishment, Ministry of Power.
- Augustus John Jenkinson, Principal, Bolton Institute of Technology.
- Charles Elliott Jervis, lately Editor-in-Chief, Press Association.
- George Clifford Jones, Nominated Member, National Savings Committee, representing Institute of Municipal Treasurers and Accountants.
- Philip Francis Keens, Chairman, London Trustee Savings Bank.
- Leo Kelly, JP. For political and public services in County Durham.
- George Farnworth Kilshaw, Chief Executive Officer, Ministry of Pensions and National Insurance.
- Alderman Victoria Florence King, JP. For public services in Southampton. (Dated 30 May 1966).
- Karl Heinz Robert Christian Kreuchen, Head of Power Klystron Section.
- John Lasky, Legal Adviser, Joint Services Liaison Organisation, Bonn, Ministry of Defence (Army).
- Frederick James Lawton, Director and General Secretary, Food Manufacturers' Federation.
- Judith Geertruid Ledeboer, lately Chairman, The Housing Centre.
- George William Lee, Director, British Coke Research Association.
- William Bauchop Leishman, JP, Member, Falkirk Town Council.
- Reginald Robert Lloyd, Assistant Chief Officer, London Fire Brigade.
- Fitz-James Bryan Long, County Welfare Officer, Hampshire County Council.
- William Lough, MBE, Principal Lecturer, Head of Department of Languages, The Royal Military Academy, Sandhurst, Ministry of Defence (Army).
- Ernest Lowry. For political and public services in Smethwick.
- Kathleen Mary Luce, Director, International Social Service of Great Britain.
- Captain Donald Thomson MacCallum, DSC, Marine Superintendent, Scottish Fishery Protection Fleet.
- Thomas Albert McDowell, MBE, Chief Press Officer, Ministry of Agriculture, Fisheries and Food.
- Robert Murdoch McGregor, TD, MB, ChB, General Practitioner, Hawick, Roxburghshire.
- Arthur Alexander MacIver, Secretary and Treasurer, Board of Management for Glasgow Royal Infirmary and Associated Hospitals.
- Robert McKean, Area Manager, Scotland, British European Airways.
- George Maclean, Assistant Chief Constable and Deputy Chief Constable, City of Glasgow Police.
- Captain William Thomson Dawson McMillan, Master, MV Peisander, Alfred Holt and Company.
- Edwin George Macnaughton, JP, Rector, Hamilton Academy.
- William Hamilton McVicker, Secretary, International Committee, The Boys' Brigade.
- Henry Maddock, lately Engineer I, Ministry of Aviation.
- Desmond Christopher Mandeville, Senior Principal Scientific Officer, Ministry of Overseas Development
- Lieutenant-Commander Leslie Horace Maskell, General Secretary and Secretary to the Council, Royal Naval Association.
- Ian Stephen Scott-Maxwell, Assistant Managing Director, Steel Company of Wales, Ltd.
- Charles Russell Metcalfe, Senior Principal Scientific Officer, Royal Botanic Gardens, Kew.
- Alderman Charles Forrest Milligan, Mayor of Bangor, County Down.
- Eric William Minter, Headmaster, Chippenham Secondary School and Chippenham Modern Boys' School, Wiltshire.
- Harry Mitchell. For political services.
- James Russell Moffatt, Principal Scientific Officer (Head of Farms), Rothamsted Experimental Station, Harpenden.
- John Richard Philip Moon, Registrar, Royal College of Art.
- Dorothy Morris, Matron, St. James' Hospital, London.
- The Reverend William Morris, formerly Archdruid of Wales.
- John Mulcaster. For political and public services in Maryport.
- Wilfrid Henry Mundy, Superintending Architect, Ministry of Public Building and Works.
- Alderman Lizzie Naylor, JP, Chairman, Children's Committee, Leeds.
- John Havelock Nelson. For services to Music in Northern Ireland.
- Alderman Edward Newby. For political and public services in Bradford.
- Alderman Albert Lawrence Newman, Chairman, North East Development Council.
- Geoffrey King Nicholls, Manager, Cable and Wireless Engineering Training College, Eastern Telegraph Company Ltd, Porthcurno.
- Captain Edgar Orr, lately Master, Esso Yorkshire, Esso Petroleum Company Ltd.
- Robert James Padfield, JP, Chairman, Essex Agricultural Executive Committee.
- Leonard Pagliero, Director, The Stationers' Association of Great Britain and Ireland.
- Ada Rosalind Paine, Regional Administrator, South West Region, Women's Voluntary Service.
- Basil Arthur Parkes, JP. For public and charitable services in Kingston-upon-Hull.
- Alan Harold Paul. For services to Yachting.
- Lieutenant-Commander Thomas Paxton, DSC, Royal Naval Reserve, Secretary, King George's Fund for Sailors in Scotland.
- Alderman Rupert Peach. For political and public services in Crewe.
- Lawrence Henry Victor Pearcey, Head of Appointments and Passages Department, Crown Agents for Oversea Governments and Administrations.
- Frederick George Ommanney Pearson, Principal Scientific Officer, Forest Products Research Laboratory, Ministry of Technology.
- Michael Stewart Pease. For political and public services in Cambridgeshire.
- Daisy Clarissa Plummer, MBE, lately General Secretary, National Children Adoption Association.
- Ralph Allan Price, Managing Director, R. C. Cutting and Company Ltd.
- Samuel Gorley Putt, Warden, Harkness House. For services to Anglo-American relationships.
- (Barbara) Mary Quant, Fashion Designer.
- Constance May Quinton, Director, Isle of Wight Branch, British Red Cross Society.
- John Reid. For political and public services in Greenock.
- Esther Rickards, MS, FRCS, Vice Chairman, North West Metropolitan Regional Hospital Board.
- Thomas Allen Roberts, Attached Ministry of Defence.
- Samuel James Rowan, JP, lately Alderman, Jarrow Borough Council, County Durham.
- William Rowell, JP. For political and public services in Leicestershire.
- John Livingstone Roxburgh, Chief Superintendent Engineer, David MacBrayne, Ltd.
- Reginald Myer Salberg, General Manager, Salisbury Arts Theatre Limited.
- Thomas Sargant, JP, Secretary of JUSTICE.
- Major Douglas Andrew Scott, JP, Chairman, Andrew Scott (Civil Engineers) Ltd.
- Thomas Scott, FRCP.Ed, Consultant Physician, Northern Regional Hospital Board (Scotland).
- Wallace Scott, Principal, Dockyard Technical College, Rosyth, Ministry of Defence (Royal Navy).
- Beatrice May Seabrook, Headmistress, Ponders End Girls' Secondary School, Enfield.
- Dennis Frederick James Shattock, Export Department Manager, H. J. Heinz Company Ltd. For services to Export.
- Raymond Neale Simmons, Superintending Technical Officer, Ministry of Public Building and Works.
- Harry Slater, Finance Officer and Assistant Head of the County Courts Branch, Lord Chancellor's Department.
- Kathleen Mary Sleven, Chief Executive Officer, Export Credits Guarantee Department.
- Hedley Archibald Sloman, Principal Scientific Officer, National Physical Laboratory, Ministry of Technology.
- Albert Smith, Alderman, City of Sheffield.
- Alderman Fred Spencer, JP. For political and public services in Bury.
- John Philip Spencer, Managing Director, Neil and Spencer Ltd. For services to Export.
- Philip John Stead, Director of General Studies, Police College, Home Office.
- Harry Steinman, Chairman, Manchester National Health Service Executive Council.
- Archibald Ian Balfour Stewart, Secretary, Clyde Fishermen's Association. For services to the Scottish Inshore Fishing Industry.
- Henry Edward Tate, JP. For public services in Bethnal Green.
- Frank William Thompson, HM Superintending Inspector of Factories, Ministry of Labour.
- Alexander John Thomson, JP, DL. For political and public services in Dundee.
- Arthur Frederick Thorp, Senior Chief Executive Officer, Ministry of Defence (Royal Air Force).
- Allan Mortimer Trewin, Superintending Civil Engineer, Ministry of Public Building and Works.
- Walter Edward Samuel Trigg, Assistant Director of Armament Supply, Ministry of Defence (Royal Navy).
- Phipps Turnbull, TD, County Planning Officer, Devon.
- William Leslie Tyson, Joint Managing Director, Tysons (Contractors) Ltd, Liverpool.
- David Lauchlan Urquhart, JP, Chairman, No. 2231 (Forfar) Squadron Committee and Dundee and Central Scotland Wing Representative Chairman, Air Training Corps.
- William Eric Clifford Varley, Chief Engineer, Transmitters, British Broadcasting Corporation.
- John Allen Warburton, Chairman, South London Advisory Committee, National Assistance Board.
- Enid Charis Warren, Head Medical Social Worker, Hammersmith Postgraduate Hospital.
- John Woolnough Wigg, MB, BS, General Medical Practitioner, London.
- John Galbraith Wilson, lately Director and Shipbuilding General Manager, Cammell Laird and Company, Birkenhead.
- Alderman Sidney Stanley Wilson, JP. For political and public services in Essex.
- Cynthia Freda Withers, lately Chief Executive Officer, Liverpool, Passport Office.
- Edith Agnes Woodhouse, MBE, Chairman, Regional Street and Village Groups Advisory Savings Committee.
- Captain Francis James Wylie, Royal Navy (Retired), lately Director, Radio Advisory Service, Chamber of Shipping of the United Kingdom.
- Harry Francis Young, Chief Aircraft Inspector, Marshall of Cambridge (Engineering) Ltd.
- Harry Waldo Yoxall, MC, JP, Governor, Star and Garter Home for Disabled Sailors, Soldiers and Airmen.

Diplomatic Service

- Leslie Edward Ahlberg, British subject resident in Belgium.
- Ian Francis Anderson, British subject resident in the Sudan.
- Samuel John Kenneth Baker, Professor in Geography, Makerere University College, Uganda.
- Frank Barber, British subject resident in Morocco.
- Arthur Stacey Barham, Assistant Commissioner of Police, Nigeria.
- Maurice Agar Barrett, lately Principal, Egerton Agricultural College, Kenya.
- John Heald Bean, Acting Deputy Director of Geological Survey, Malaysia.
- William Bell, lately Chief Mechanical Engineer, Ministry of Works, Eastern Nigeria.
- Robert Killian Brady, British Council Representative, Ceylon.
- Michael Lindsay Charlesworth, British subject resident in Pakistan.
- James Alexander Chesney, President of the British Chamber of Commerce, Spain.
- Ralf Clode, British subject resident in France.
- Stephen Hammett Clode, Deputy Director of Audit, Northern Nigeria.
- Gerald Geoffrey Vincent Coleman, MBE, lately British Vice-Consul, Tela.
- Kathleen Collard, lately Professor of Mathematics, University of Ibadan, Nigeria.
- Thomas Joseph Coyle, lately Chief Veterinary Research Officer, Uganda.
- Michael Davies, Permanent Secretary, School of Public Administration, Uganda.
- Walter Davies, Secretary-General, British Chamber of Commerce, Italy.
- George Duckett, Assistant Superintendent of Police, Nigeria.
- Stanley Sidney Edis, British subject resident in Nigeria.
- Margaret Faraday Evans, MBE, Headmistress, San Silvestre Girls' School, Lima.
- Alan Lovejoy Fawdry, MD, Senior Medical Officer (States), Ministry of Health, Federation of South Arabia.
- James Probyn-Franck, Senior Treasury Solicitor, Inland Revenue Department, Malaysia.
- Edward Stephen Goddard, British subject resident in Pakistan.
- George Fuller Harris, MB, ChB. For services in the medical field in Nigeria.
- Graham McLean Higgins, Principal Research Officer, Institute of Agricultural Research, Samaru, Northern Nigeria.
- Thomas William Hill, British subject resident in Mexico.
- John Frederick Hook, British subject resident in Indonesia.
- Alfred Edward Huckin, British subject resident in Venezuela.
- John Whiteford Hutson, Her Majesty's Consul (Commercial), San Francisco.
- Frederick Hume Jackson, First Secretary (Commercial), Her Majesty's Embassy, Washington.
- Roy Vincent Jones, Deputy Commissioner of Police, Nigeria.
- Horas Tristram Kennedy, Commercial Secretary, Her Majesty's Embassy, Santiago.
- Ernest John Kerly, Her Majesty's Consul, Palermo.
- William Robert Knott, British subject resident in the United States of America.
- Mary Josephine Lackey, First Secretary, United Kingdom Mission to the Office of the United Nations and other International Organisations at Geneva.
- William Robert Long-Will, British subject resident in Pakistan.
- Bernard Maurice Lott, Director of Studies, Central Institute of English, Hyderabad.
- Jack Ernest Lowe, British subject resident in the United States of America.
- James Watt McAllan, MB, ChB, lately Medical Officer of Health, Nairobi, Kenya.
- William Robert Brown McBain, MC, AFC, British subject resident in China.
- John Geoffrey Matters, British subject resident in Chile.
- William Nisbet Roper Maxwell, Her Majesty's Consul (Commercial), Milan.
- Thomas Owen Morris, MBE, Lecturer in Geology, Arts and Science University, Mandalay.
- James Simson Nisbet, British subject resident in Brazil.
- George Thomas Nixon, MBE, British subject resident in the Netherlands Antilles.
- David Francis Pawson, MBE, British subject resident in Greece.
- Donald Garrick Pickering, Deputy Chief Agricultural Officer, Northern Nigeria.
- Winston Albert Mellor Ramsbotham, Chief Engineer, Radio Malaysia, Sabah, Malaysia.
- Thomas William Sharrad, lately Principal, Teacher Training College, Siriba, Kenya.
- Bruce Hereward Simmonds, lately Stores Superintendent, East African Railways and Harbours.
- Donald Brewer Stewart, British subject resident in Peru.
- Patrick Brian Sweeney, lately Commissioner of Customs and Excise, Aden.
- Leonie Anne Marie Tockert, MBE, lately British Pro-Consul, Luxembourg.
- Frank Ivor Tovey, MB, ChB, Medical Missionary, Holdsworth Memorial Hospital, Mysore.
- Onslow Joseph John Tuckley, MBE, British Council Representative, Persian Gulf.
- John Hallworth Whitehead, British Broadcasting Corporation Middle East Representative.
- Douglas George Wilson, lately Commissioner, Inland Revenue Department, Sarawak, Malaysia.
- George Vaughan Chichester Young, Regional Legal Draftsman and Reprint Commissioner, Malaysia.
- Hector Ronald MacNiven-Young. For public services in Aden.

State of New South Wales

- Grahame Edgar, Director-General, Department of Agriculture.
- Dudley Gordon Padman, of Albury. For services to local government and community organisations.
- Rabbi Israel Porush, Chief Minister of the Great Synagogue in Sydney.
- Howard Morris Saxby, MB. Medical Superintendent and Chief Executive Officer, Mater Misericordiae Hospital, North Sydney.
- Claude Henry Vautin, President of the New South Wales Division of the Air Force Association.
- Nancy Bird Walton. For services to the community, particularly on behalf of the Far West Children's Health Scheme.

State of Victoria

- Samuel Gerald Wood Burston, of Casterton. For services to fire-fighting.
- Annie Delany, of Bright. For social welfare services.
- Councillor John Beynon Dwyer, of Warrnambool. For local government and community services.
- George Thomas Thompson, Director of the Natural Resources Conservation League.
- Edith Winter Wallace, State President of the Country Women's Association of Victoria.
- Councillor Arthur Branscombe Wood, JP, of Geelong. For local government and community services.

State of Queensland

- John Patrick Kelly, Chairman of the Mater Misericordiae Hospitals Medical Advisory Board.
- The Reverend Robert McCann Park, of Toowong. For his services to the Presbyterian Church and welfare activities.
- Egmont Friedrich Hellmuth Theile, MB, BS, of Brisbane. For his services in the interests of community health and youth welfare.
- John Robert Winders, of Brisbane. For services to municipal administration and the development of the surf life saving movement.

State of Western Australia

- William Grant McDonald, JP, General President of the Farmers Union of Western Australia.
- James Murray O'Brien, MVO, lately Commissioner of Police, Western Australia Police Force.
- William Charles Gordon Thomas, Mayor of South Perth.

State of Tasmania

- Trevor Cory Beard, MRCS, LRCP. For services to public health, particularly as Secretary of the Tasmanian Hydatids Eradication Council.
- Ronald Arthur Smith. For charitable and other community services.

Colonial Office

- David Whinfield Barclay Baron. Director of Social Welfare, Hong Kong.
- Colin Boocock, MBE, Director of Geological Survey, Bechuanaland.
- Vere Ian de Lacey Carrington, Permanent Secretary, Ministry of Home Affairs, Barbados.
- Charles Eustace Clark, District Commissioner, Bechuanaland.
- Ulric Gibbs Crick, Headmaster, Grammar School, St. Vincent.
- William George Johnston Cruickshank, Postmaster-General, Fiji.
- James Jeffrey Dickie, Attorney-General, Swaziland.
- Kenneth Robert John Eardley, MD. For services to the community in the Bahama Islands.
- George Edmund Morrison Ewing, JP. For public services in the Turks and Caicos Islands.
- Ralph Leonard Gauntlett, Collector of Customs, Bermuda.
- Emilius Alfred Hermida, Treasurer and Accountant, City Council, Gibraltar.
- Professor Arthur Ralph Hodgson, MB, ChB, Dean of the Faculty of Medicine, University of Hong Kong.
- Kenneth Arnold William Johnson, Director of Audit, Fiji.
- Reginald Ewart Lawry, British Council Representative, Hong Kong.
- Frank Ward Lovell, Director of Telecommunications, Mauritius.
- Joel Thabiso Mohapeloa, MBE, Chairman, Public Service Commission, Basutoland.
- Louis Johannes Mynhardt. For public services in Bechuanaland.
- Reginald Francis Oldham, DSO, Senior Assistant Secretary (Development), Swaziland.
- Professor Ong Guan-bee, MD, FRCS, Hon. Surgical Consultant Kwong Wah and Grantham Hospitals, Hong Kong.
- Louise Rowley, Permanent Secretary, Ministry of Social Services and Labour, Grenada.
- Peter Marriott Smith, Accountant-General, British Solomon Islands Protectorate.
- Choi Wai-haan Yeoh. For social services in Hong Kong.

British Guiana

- George Francois de Sebastiani, JP. For public services in British Guiana.
- Alexander Irvin Crumewing. For public and social services in British Guiana.
- Randolph Samuel Persaud, Commissioner of Title, British Guiana.
- Joseph Henry Pollydore. For service in the development of trade unionism in British Guiana.
- Antony Greaves Tasker, OBE. For public services in British Guiana.

==== Member of the Order of the British Empire (MBE) ====
Military Division

Royal Navy

- Barbara Gordon Beazley, ARRC, Queen Alexandra's Royal Naval Nursing Service.
- Lieutenant Commander (S.C.C.) Archibald Walter Campbell, Royal Naval Reserve.
- Lieutenant Commander John Frederick Cooke, DSM, Nigerian Navy.
- Lieutenant Commander (S.C.C.) Osborne Langley Cossens, Royal Naval Reserve.
- Lieutenant John Stanley Day, Royal New Zealand Navy (formerly on loan to the Malaysian Government).
- Lieutenant Commander (S.D.) (G) Samuel Erskine.
- Lieutenant Commander (S.D.) (C) Gordon Froud, DSM, (now Retired).
- Electrical Lieutenant (A.L.) Francis Joseph Patrick Gallagher.
- Lieutenant Commander Cecil Edward Gibson.
- Electrical Lieutenant Commander (L) Claude Hills.
- Lieutenant (S.D.) (G) Bertie Charles Howson, (for services with the British Joint Services Training Team, Ghana).
- Instructor Lieutenant Commander Geoffrey David Thomas Jones.
- Commander John Edmund Marshall, VRD, Royal Malaysian Naval Volunteer Reserve.
- Lieutenant Commander Charles Donald Wilson Pugh.
- Lieutenant Commander Michael Cecil Mainwaring Smith.
- Lieutenant (S.D.) (C) Peter Wellings Sochall.
- Lieutenant Commander Arthur Frederick Southgate.
- Lieutenant Commander (S.C.C.) Alec Saville Tempest, DSM, Royal Naval Reserve.
- Engineer Lieutenant (M.E.) Arthur John Waldron.
- Lieutenant Derek Charles Wallace, (now Retired) (for services with the British Joint Services Training Team, Ghana).

Army

- Major Charles George Harley Arnold (373610), Royal Regiment of Artillery.
- Major Eric Walter Barton (393871), Corps of Royal Engineers.
- Major George Kenneth Bidie (386204), The Queen's Royal Irish Hussars, Royal Armoured Corps.
- Major Peter Charles McEwen Brooks (277303), Royal Regiment of Artillery.
- Captain (acting) William John Brown (395589), Army Cadet Force (now retired).
- Captain Cyril James Caines, TD (415407), The Royal Northumberland Fusiliers, Territorial Army.
- 22237051 Warrant Officer Class I Robert Renwick Calvert, Corps of Royal Electrical and Mechanical Engineers.
- Major (acting) Charles Norman Creek (367935), Combined Cadet Force.
- Captain (acting) John Henry Davies (395235), Army Cadet Force.
- Major Edward Victor Davis (420211), Royal Armoured Corps.
- Major George Ernest Herbert Deadman, ERD (231680), Corps of Royal Electrical and Mechanical Engineers, Army Emergency Reserve (now R.A.R.O.).
- Lieutenant-Colonel (temporary) George Philip Alexander Delmé-Murray, DSO (336026), The King's Shropshire Light Infantry, formerly on loan to the Government of Malaysia.
- Major Domingo Deus (326898), Army Catering Corps.
- Captain (Quartermaster) Leonard Joseph Donald (459441), The King's Own Scottish Borderers, Territorial Army.
- Captain (Quartermaster) Norman Duckworth, MM (452963), Coldstream Guards.
- Major (temporary) James Egan (259500), Corps of Royal Electrical and Mechanical Engineers.
- Major Eric John Foxall (414849), The King's Own Royal Border Regiment.
- 14479486 Warrant Officer Class I Frederick Graham, The Parachute Regiment.
- Major George Greenwood (426678), Corps of Royal Electrical and Mechanical Engineers, formerly on loan to the Government of Malaysia.
- Major (Quartermaster) Leslie Percy Grout (433978), The Royal Green Jackets (now R.A.R.O.).
- Major Robin Edward Doveton Harris, MC (397919), 14th/20th King's Hussars, Royal Armoured Corps.
- Lieutenant Mona Emmie Hart (421495), Women's Royal Army Corps, Territorial Army.
- Major Roy Henry Haynes (320599), Royal Regiment of Artillery.
- Major (Quartermaster) Jack Hopkins (451805), Royal Corps of Signals.
- Major (Quartermaster) Jesse Ingram (337480), The King's Regiment, (Manchester and Liverpool), formerly on loan to the British Army Training Team, Kenya.
- Major John Richard Johnson (382784), Corps of Royal Engineers.
- Captain Henry Alfred Gordon Jones (308332), Royal Regiment of Artillery, Territorial Army.
- Major (Quartermaster) James William Kemp (428836), The Queen's Royal Surrey Regiment.
- 22950967 Warrant Officer Class II James Thomas Kermode, Small Arms School Corps.
- Captain (T.I.G.) Thomas Laing (472887), Royal Regiment of Artillery.
- Major Nigel Last (400415), Army Catering Corps.
- Major John David Lewis (406957), The Royal Welch Fusiliers, Territorial Army.
- 550709 Warrant Officer Class II Frederick Lorimer, The Cheshire Yeomanry, Royal Armoured Corps, Territorial Army.
- Major Pierre Etienne Marot (371473), Royal Pioneer Corps.
- Major James Bowden McGhee, TD (198709), Royal Regiment of Artillery, Territorial Army (now Territorial Army Reserve of Officers).
- Major Peter Ernest Mee (430171), Royal Corps of Transport, Territorial Army.
- Major Hugh Jackson Minford, MC, TD, MB (103147), Royal Army Medical Corps, Territorial Army.
- Captain Michael John Moore (445923), 15th/19th The King's Royal Hussars, Royal Armoured Corps.
- Major Francis Howard Nalder, TD (194685), Royal Regiment of Artillery, Territorial Army.
- Major Patricia Norman (196918), Women's Royal Army Corps, serving with the British Joint Services Team, Ghana.
- 21126462 Warrant Officer Class I Clement William Palmer, Royal Corps of Signals.
- Major Arthur Pearson, MC, TD (301498), Royal Army Pay Corps, Territorial Army.
- Major Nicholas John Douglas Prescott (400026), Corps of Royal Engineers.
- 22213134 Warrant Officer Class II Peter David Quinn, Royal Corps of Transport.
- Captain Director of Music Robert Quinn (472219), Royal Regiment of Artillery.
- Captain Raymond James Robinson (463586), Royal Corps of Signals.
- 1461989 Warrant Officer Class II Alfred Walter Rolph, Royal Regiment of Artillery.
- Major Ernest Nigel Ross-Magenty (330816), Corps of Royal Engineers.
- Major Edward Roy Shaddock (387019), Royal Regiment of Artillery.
- Captain (temporary) Roger James Lester Sherrin (467631), The Royal Sussex Regiment, The Royal Brunei Malay Regiment.
- Major Francis Sloan (182121), Royal Corps of Signals.
- Major John Geoffrey Starling, MC (361898), The Parachute Regiment.
- Lieutenant and Paymaster John Strickland (480170), Royal Army Pay Corps.
- Major Patrick Malcolm Brogden Sutcliffe, TD (276956), Berkshire and Westminster Dragoons, Royal Armoured Corps, Territorial Army.
- Major (Q.G.O.) Tejbahadur Gurung, (405958), 6th Queen Elizabeth's Own Gurkha Rifles.
- Major Andrew Hugh Turnbull (102042), Royal Corps of Transport.
- Major Jack Ernest Tye (190742), Royal Regiment of Artillery.
- The Reverend Robert Tinsley Warburton, Chaplain to the Forces Third Class (446419), Royal Army Chaplains' Department, Territorial Army.
- 22304027 Warrant Officer Class I John Carlton Weatherston, BEM, Royal Regiment of Artillery, Territorial Army.
- Major (T.I.G.) Albert Charles Welham (433283), Royal Regiment of Artillery.
- 21007121 Warrant Officer Class I (local) Norman Welch, Coldstream Guards.
- 2741094 Warrant Officer Class I David Lewis Williams, Welsh Guards.
- Lieutenant-Colonel (temporary) Frank Derek Williams (368920), Royal Corps of Signals.

Overseas Award

- Captain Dennis Charles Gardiner, Officer Commanding the Antigua Defence Force.

Royal Air Force

- Squadron Leader Leslie John Anderson (502113).
- Squadron Leader David Alfred Barnard (4048041).
- Squadron Leader (Acting Wing Commander) Jack Willson Beale (161764).
- Squadron Leader David Harold Bernard (966856).
- Squadron Leader Derek Thomas Bryant (2552398).
- Squadron Leader Robert George Parker-Eaton (2465058).
- Squadron Leader John Walter Everitt (187782).
- Squadron Leader John Sinclair Gibbs (51810).
- Squadron Leader Brian Trevor Griffiths (2600717).
- Squadron Leader Robert Harold Groves (53039).
- Squadron Leader William Ronald Groves (190323).
- Squadron Leader James Hartley (57565).
- Squadron Leader Norman Keith Hopkins (607131).
- Squadron Leader Harold Clive Jamieson (502941).
- Squadron Leader Michael Henry Levy (3039051).
- Squadron Leader Alexander Lyle (58422).
- Squadron Leader John Ignatius McGrory (189428).
- Squadron Leader David Pearce (591201).
- Squadron Leader David William Scott (578729).
- Squadron Leader Reginald Sidney Shepherd (49480).
- Squadron Leader Bertram Harold Alfred Vincent Stiles (46641).
- Squadron Leader Maurice Ellery Taylor (1312073).
- Squadron Leader Charles Marcus Guy Watson (184295).
- Squadron Leader David Whittaker (2535154).
- Flight Lieutenant Victor Emmanuel Azzaro, DFC (56448).
- Flight Lieutenant Leslie Albert Bull (573791).
- Flight Lieutenant Colin William Charles Heal (505840).
- Flight Lieutenant John Holmes (568618).
- Flight Lieutenant Ronald Charles Hooper (123244), (for services while on loan to the Government of Malaysia).
- Flight Lieutenant Barrie Robin Vivian Hylton (609188).
- Flight Lieutenant James Sherrington (59246).
- Flight Lieutenant Harry Walter Twidle (505333).
- Flight Lieutenant Norman Westby, DFC, AFC (177634).
- Acting Flight Lieutenant Joseph MacLean (3023140).
- Acting Flight Lieutenant Clifford Turner (110786), Royal Air Force Volunteer Reserve (Training Branch).
- Warrant Officer Herbert Peter Boulton Baker (A0527647).
- Warrant Officer Thomas Hugh Clark (T0517037).
- Warrant Officer Thomas Harold Ellis (W0560746).
- Warrant Officer Leslie Charles Herriott (S1156378).
- Warrant Officer Alexander McGrath (W0567371).
- Warrant Officer Ronald Herbert William Osborne (P1157281), Royal Air Force Regiment.
- Warrant Officer George Thomas Robinson (U0513891).

Civil Division

- Harry Finedon Alexander, Works Transport Officer (Non-Technical Officer Grade A), Windscale and Calder Works, Production Group, United Kingdom Atomic Energy Authority.
- George Fitzgerald Alton, Assistant Executive Engineer, Belfast, General Post Office.
- George Stafford Anderson, Member, No. 138 (1st Nottingham) Squadron Committee, Air Training Corps.
- John William Anderson, lately Senior Clerk of Works (Bridges), Durham County Council.
- Sidney Charles Andrews, Farmer, Hereford. For services to quality seed production.
- Barbara Mary Ashton, Village Nurse/Midwife, Plymstock area, Devon.
- Eric Ashton, Coach and Captain, Wigan Rugby League Football Club.
- Albert Horace Atherton, Manager, Ruislip Factory, E.M.I. Electronics Valve Division.
- Molly Grace Balint, Senior Executive Officer, Ministry of Aviation.
- James Gordon Ball. For political services in Shrewsbury.
- Frederick Ballard, Higher Executive Officer, Ministry of Power.
- Donald Hall Barraclough, Manager, Sewage Purification Department, Burgh of Motherwell and Wishaw.
- Mary Barrer, Matron, Home of Rest, Ramsey, Isle of Man.
- Ada Lilian Bartington, lately Superintendent of Typists, Ministry of Labour.
- Phyllis Winifred Bartle, Higher Executive Officer, Crown Estate Office.
- Margaret Taylor Bartlet, lately Headmistress, Tynepark Approved School for Girls, Haddington.
- Sidney Albert Bartlett, Export Manager, Huntley & Palmers Ltd. For services to Export.
- Huldah Charles Bassett, Headmistress, Gowerton Girls' Grammar School.
- Cedric Andrew Bastard, Clerical Officer, Department of Education and Science.
- Frederick Allen Batty, Sales Director, Head Wrightson Machine Company Ltd. For services to Export.
- Edward James Bayer, Chief Catering Officer, SS Ceramic, Shaw Savill and Albion Company Ltd.
- William Bernard Beach, Technical Class Grade A, Ministry of Defence (Royal Navy).
- Agnes Ida Beaven, lately Secretary, Berkshire County Blind Society.
- Frank William Bedford, TD, Clerical Officer, Cabinet Office.
- Ewart Bell, County Youth Services Officer, Surrey.
- Florence Ann Benson. For political services in Cumberland.
- John George Betty, Member and past Chairman, Risca Urban District Council, Monmouthshire.
- Henry George Blowers, lately Trawler Skipper, Lowestoft.
- Joseph Cope Booth, Park Superintendent, 1st Class, Battersea Park, Greater London Council.
- Joan Bradbrooke, Head, Publications Department and Journal Editor, Royal Aeronautical Society.
- Wilhelmina Bradshaw. For political services in Newcastle upon Tyne.
- John Fernie Bremner, Superintendent, Northern Lighthouse Board.
- Norine Brookes, formerly Headmistress, Arkwright Street Infants School, Nottingham.
- Captain Michael Warwick Broom, Senior Captain, British European Airways.
- Walter Alexander Brotchie, Higher Executive Officer, Scottish Education Department.
- Kathleen Jason Brown. For social services in Ulverston, Lancashire.
- Leonard Bullock, Clerical Officer, Board of Trade.
- Richard Bullock, JP. For political and public services in Hucknall.
- Hilary Margarette Burgess, JP. For services to the Girl Guides Association.
- Fergus James Burland. For services to the British Legion.
- Judith Eileen Butler. For services to Wolf Cubs in Radnorshire.
- Alistair Cameron, Head Forester, Strathyre Forest, Forestry Commission.
- James Harold Canty, Works Inspector, Hull Docks, British Transport Docks Board.
- Fredrick George Carter, Chief Engineer (Paving Division), Robert McGregor and Sons Ltd.
- William Edward Carter, lately Divisional (Roads) Surveyor, Western Area, Leicestershire County Council.
- Henry McCarrel Carton, JP, District Commandant, Ulster Special Constabulary.
- Margaret Barbara Duncan Cavendish, Staff Officer to the Superintendent-in-Chief, St. John Ambulance Brigade Headquarters.
- Royston Thomas Cavill, Director and Chief Engineer, Newton Brothers (Derby), Ltd.
- Alderman Alfred John Eric Chilton, Freight Depot Manager, Park Royal, British Railways Board.
- William Roberts Clark, Head Postmaster, Luton.
- George Edgar Copeman, Manager, Peterhead Factory, Crosse & Blackwell Ltd.
- Patrick Francis Corbett, JP. For political and public services in London.
- Alice Mary Crittenden. For political and public services in Hartfield and East Grinstead.
- Alastair Campbell Crockatt, Chairman and Managing Director, W. Crockatt and Sons Ltd, Glasgow. For services to Export.
- Peter Dudley Crofts, Administrative Officer, City and Guilds of London Institute.
- Ernest Patrick Cronin, Agent for Peter Lind and Company Ltd.
- Harry Norman Dain, National Savings District Member for South West Hampshire.
- Dennis William Daly, Higher Executive Officer, Ministry of Defence (Royal Navy).
- Major George Raymond Davies, Secretary, John Innes Institute, Bayfordbury, Hertford.
- John Geoffrey Davies, Senior Technical Officer, St. George's Hospital, London.
- John Martin Davies, Honorary Secretary, Swansea Savings Committee.
- Watkin Davies, lately Manager, Hot Strip Mill, Ebbw Vale Works, Richard Thomas and Baldwins Ltd.
- Christiana Davis, Headmistress, Walworth Castle Residential School for Educationally Sub-normal Girls, County Durham.
- William Davison, Chairman, Ashington and District Youth Employment Committee.
- Leonard Harry Day, Senior Executive Officer, Colonial Office.
- Alderman George Henry Dean, JP. For political and public services in Loughborough.
- Eric Mansell Denny, Senior Experimental Officer, Central Veterinary Laboratory, Weybridge, Ministry of Agriculture, Fisheries and Food.
- Margaret Yvonne De Pury, lately Head of Reception Unit, Visitors Department, British Council.
- Captain Antony De Salis, DSO, Royal Navy (Retired), Librarian, Imperial Defence College, Ministry of Defence.
- Herbert Wigmore Desborough, Higher Executive Officer, HM Stationery Office.
- Reginald Herbert Dixon, Organist, Blackpool Tower.
- Philip Douge, lately Honorary Secretary, Carlton and District Savings Committee.
- Kenneth Owen Downing, Higher Executive Officer, Explosives Research and Development Establishment, Waltham Abbey, Essex, Ministry of Aviation.
- Agnes Duncan, Conductor of Scottish Junior Singers.
- Jean Mary Duncan Gomme-Duncan. For services to the Victoria Cross and George Cross Association.
- Herbert Llewellyn Edwards, Higher Executive Officer, Ministry of Defence (Royal Air Force).
- Humphrey Edwards, lately Chief Engineer, Aureity, F. T. Everard and Sons Ltd.
- Sonia Irene Linda Elkin, lately Overseas Secretary, Association of British Chambers of Commerce.
- Phyllis Alberta Farmer, Sister-in-charge, Casualty Department, Woolwich Memorial Hospital, London.
- Helen Velleda Farrar. For social services in Halifax.
- Edward Dyson France, National Industrial Officer, National Federation of Building Trades Operatives.
- Barbara Edith Franks, Matron, Old Peoples' Homes, Norfolk County Council.
- Irene Fricker, Superintendent of Typists, Ministry of Agriculture, Fisheries arid Food.
- Norman Frith, JP, Deputy Chairman, Cheshire Agricultural Executive Committee.
- John Emerson Furness, JP. For public services in Wrenthorpe and district.
- Edwin Guisseppe Galea, Local Assistant Naval Movements and Sea Transport Officer, Malta, Ministry of Defence (Royal Navy).
- John Gardner, Superintendent of Plant and Ships, Ministry of Public Building and Works.
- Reginald George James Garrard, Higher Executive Office, Board of Trade.
- James George, Regional Ambulance Officer, South Eastern Region, Scotland.
- Frederick John Gerrard, Senior Executive Officer, Headquarters, British Army of the Rhine, Ministry of Defence (Army).
- Maria Charlotte Gibson, Senior Executive Officer, HM Treasury.
- Frederick Charles Gilbert, Clerical Officer, Church Commissioners.
- Joe Glucksmann, Headmaster, Woodhouse County Secondary School, Leeds.
- Henry Goodfellow, Chief Experimental Officer, Weapons Group, United Kingdom Atomic Energy Authority, Aldermaston.
- Kenneth John Green, Executive Officer, Ministry of Pensions and National Insurance.
- Oliver William Collins Gregory, Overseas Marketing Manager, Griffin and George Ltd. For services to Export.
- Ida Muriel Griffiths, Operating Theatre Superintendent, Norfolk and Norwich Hospital.
- Walter John Groom, Technical Grade B (Construction), South Western Region, Ministry of Public Building and Works.
- John Vernon Gwilliam, Chairman, Stroud Local Employment Committee.
- Katherine McKane Haime, Inspector of Taxes, Board of Inland Revenue.
- Eileen Mary Hall, Grade 3 Officer, Ministry of Labour.
- Frank Hamer, lately Engineering Technical Class Grade I, Directorate of Engine Production, Ministry of Aviation.
- Alderman Robert Ward Hanlan. For political and public services in Newcastle upon Tyne.
- Norman Tainsh Hardie, Principal Teacher of Technical Subjects, Oban High School.
- Herbert James Harris, BEM, County Civil Defence Officer, Herefordshire.
- John Beaven Harris, Higher Executive Officer, Record and Pay Office, Gloucester, Ministry of Defence (Royal Air Force).
- Rose Harriet Harris, Head of Physical Education Department and Careers Mistress, John Howard Secondary Grammar School, London.
- William John Harris, Head Postmaster, Barmouth.
- Norman Edward Edgar Hatt, Superintending Clerk, Fees Office, House of Commons.
- Charles Alexander Hayes, Senior Executive Officer, Ministry of Defence (Royal Navy).
- Bertram Alfred Kenneth Hester, Senior Driving Examiner, Bristol, Ministry of Transport.
- Agnes Cecilia Hetherington, Grade 9 Officer, HM Diplomatic Service.
- Barbara Ruth Hewens, Senior Examiner, Board of Inland Revenue.
- Arno Ludwig Heymann, Chairman and Managing Director, Marida Hat Manufacturing Company Ltd. For services to Export.
- William Charles Hocking, Member, Cornwall Agricultural Executive Committee.
- Selina Hodgson, JP. For political and public services in County Durham.
- George Hossack, Senior Executive Officer, Ministry of Pensions and National Insurance.
- Derek Allan Hough, TD, General Secretary, Institute of Petroleum.
- George Barclay Houston, Registrar of Births, Deaths and Marriages, Haymarket District of Edinburgh.
- Stanley Stephen Howard, Chief Officer, Scientific and Reconnaissance Sub-Section, East Sussex Civil Defence Corps.
- Thomas Alfred Hoyland, Resident Engineer, Palace of Westminster, Ministry of Public Building and Works.
- Raymond Hughes, Deputy Chief Officer, Hertfordshire Fire Brigade.
- Olive Hulme, Matron, Royal Hospital for Sick Children, Oakbank, Glasgow.
- George Alfred Inns, Executive Producer, Light Entertainment Group, Television, British Broadcasting Corporation.
- Margaret Jay, Photographs Librarian, Central Office of Information.
- William Jeffery, JP, Regional Production Manager (Northern Region), National Coal Board.
- Horace Josiah Johnson, Group Secretary, Huddersfield Hospital Management Committee.
- Blodwen May Jones, JP. For political and public services in Glamorgan.
- Daniel Morgan Jones, Conductor of Hammersmith Male Voice Choir.
- Dilys Jones, JP, Chairman, Griffins Society, HM Prison, Holloway.
- Norah Irene May Landon-Jones, lately Secretary and Treasurer, Alexandra House (Royal United Services Home for Children), Newquay, Cornwall.
- Charles Kemp, Senior Executive Officer, Ministry of Pensions and National Insurance.
- Edward King, Assistant Executive Engineer, North Eastern Region, General Post Office.
- Joseph King, lately Chairman, Stratford Market Tenants Association Ltd.
- Joseph Alfred Charles King, Technical Officer Grade I, Manchester Regional Office, Prison Department, Home Office.
- Ernest Henry Kirk, Senior Executive Officer, Lincoln Divisional Office, Ministry of Agriculture, Fisheries and Food.
- Reginald Arthur Kirkman. For services to youth in Derbyshire.
- Wing Commander Thomas Robert Knight, Temporary Senior Executive Officer, Communications-Electronic Security Department.
- The Reverend Frederick Laight, Chaplain, Mission Vessel John Ashley, The Missions to Seamen.
- Major Vernon Arthur Lamb, Clerical Officer (Ordnance Survey), Ministry of Land and Natural Resources.
- Colin Richard Land, Chairman, Wakefield, Pontefract and District War Pensions Committee.
- William Edward Lawman, Technical Sales Director, CMP Glands Ltd. For services to Export.
- James Leyland Lawrenson, Technical Grade I, Chemical Defence Experimental Establishment, Nancekuke, Ministry of Defence (Army).
- James Andrew Lawson, JP, Provost, Royal Burgh of Queensferry.
- Angus Murray Learmont, Deputy Chief Fire Officer, Liverpool Fire Brigade.
- Kate Learoyd, Honorary Secretary, Withernsea Savings Committee.
- Thomas Frederick Leigh, Area Manager, London (Paddington), National Assistance Board.
- Sally Lewis. For political and public services in Sheffield.
- Sam Lewis. For public services in Rainford and district.
- Winifred Lindsay, Executive Officer, Ministry of Power.
- Joseph Alfred Livingstone, JP, Chairman, South Fermanagh Local Savings Committee.
- Alderman Watkin Lloyd, JP, lately Member, Denbighshire County Agricultural Executive Committee.
- Arnold Lockwood, Chief Superintendent, Metropolitan Police.
- Edward Low, Governor (Class IV), Cornton Vale Borstal Institution, Scottish Office.
- Robert Lucas, Scriptwriter, British Broadcasting Corporation.
- Elisabeth Westbrook McClure, attached Ministry of Defence.
- John William McColville, Resident Engineer, Huntingdonshire and Peterborough County Council.
- Commander Hugh Lindsay McCulloch, Royal Navy (Retired), Vice Chairman, Ayr Sea Cadet Unit Committee.
- Robert Lewis McIlmoyle, Assistant Civil Engineer, London Midland Region. British Railways Board.
- John MacInnes, Crofters Commission Assessor. For services to Crofting in South Uist.
- Harry Murdoch Mackay, Sports News Editor (Sound), British Broadcasting Corporation.
- Hilda McKeague, lately Secretary Accountant, Central Council for District Nursing in London.
- Claude Thomas McLaughlin, Clerical Officer, Imperial War Museum, Department of Education and Science.
- Mary Deans McNaught, JP, Child Welfare Organiser, Northern Division (Scotland), Women's Voluntary Service.
- William McNeil, Site Agent at Jharia, India, British Ropeway Engineering Company Ltd.
- Daniel Joseph McNeill, Principal, Downpatrick Technical School, County Down.
- Vida Margaret McQuaker, Psychiatric Social Worker, Claremont Street Hospital, Belfast.
- George Chappie Maeer, Surveyor, Board of Customs and Excise.
- Frederick Henry Edwards Maidment, Production Manager, Preston Division, British Aircraft Corporation (Operating) Ltd.
- Alexander Mair, Company Secretary, Grampian Television Ltd.
- Leslie Bertram Edmund Manning, Executive Officer, Ministry of Pensions and National Insurance.
- Sidney Frederick Marlow, Senior Executive Officer, Board of Inland Revenue.
- Dorothea Lydia Marriott, Secretary to the Dean of Westminster.
- Rose May, Catering Manager, Bush House, British Broadcasting Corporation.
- Charles Stafford Mead, Field Officer Grade I (Pests), Ministry of Agriculture, Fisheries and Food.
- Margaret Frances Milne, General Secretary, Hastings and St. Leonards Central Aid Council and Citizens' Advice Bureau.
- Edward Moore, JP, National Savings District Member for East Staffordshire.
- Ernest Albert Morgan, Chief Clerk, Territorial and Auxiliary Forces Association for the County of Kent.
- George Raymond Morgan. For political and public services in Monmouthshire.
- Nancy Rhys Morgan, Branch Welfare Officer, Glamorgan Branch, British Red Cross Society.
- Stanley Martin Morgan, Deputy Principal, Ministry of Home Affairs for Northern Ireland.
- Frederick George Mortimore. For political and public services in Teignmouth.
- George Victor Mosdell, Chief Draftsman (Mechanical and Electrical), Ministry of Public Building and Works.
- Duncan McFarlane Muir, Training Service Officer II, Ministry of Labour.
- Gerald Douglass Mullan, Deputy Principal, Ministry of Finance for Northern Ireland.
- Alderman Harry Abraham Myers, National Savings District Member for Stockport.
- Nora Kathleen Neal. For social services in Stepney.
- Alfred Needham. For political and public services in Mexborough.
- Charles Edward New, Clerical Officer, Ministry of Housing and Local Government.
- Thomas Nicklin, Chief Scientist, North Western Gas Board.
- Cecil Thomas Nightingale, Executive Officer, Ministry of Transport.
- William Stobbart Ord, BEM, Superintendent, Northumberland Constabulary. Commandant, District Police Training Centre, Northallerton.
- Nancy Osborne, Executive Officer, Ministry of Overseas Development.
- Albert Elwyn Owen, lately Area Secretary, Electrical Trades Union.
- Emyr Hywel Owen, Senior Lecturer in Education, Normal College, Bangor.
- George Charles Packer, BEM, Deputy Assistant Chief Officer, London Fire Brigade.
- Norman Frederick Packham, lately Executive Officer, No. 30 Maintenance Unit, Sealand, Ministry of Defence (Royal Air Force).
- Robert Henry Parfett, Engineering Technical Class Grade I, Royal Aircraft Establishment, Farnborough, Ministry of Aviation.
- Robert Park, Honorary Public Relations Officer, Waltham Forest Borough Savings Committee.
- William Herbert Parker, lately Member, Cheltenham Rent Tribunal.
- Harold Bevan Parry, Senior Accountant, Directorate of Catering, Ministry of Aviation.
- Stuart Theodore St John Parry, Chairman, Taunton, Yeovil and District War Pensions Committee.
- George Montague Parsons, Chief Radio Officer, RMS Queen Elizabeth, International Marine Radio Company Ltd.
- Barbara Grace Payn, County Youth Employment Officer, Glamorgan.
- Stanley John Pearce, Installation Engineer, The Marconi Company Ltd.
- Norman Derek Penfold, Assistant Chief Engineer, Digital Systems Department, Ferranti Ltd, Bracknell Laboratories, Berkshire.
- Charles Harry Gordon Phillips. For political and public services in the West Riding of Yorkshire.
- Margaret Elizabeth Phillips, locally entered Clerk, Grade I, British Navy Staff, Washington, Ministry of Defence (Royal Navy).
- Cecil Henry Percival Philo, Higher Executive Officer, Royal Armoured Corps Record Office, Ministry of Defence (Army).
- Maud Rosetta Piggott, lately Senior Executive Officer, Ministry of Pensions and National Insurance.
- William Ernest Pimblott, lately Chief Superintendent, Head Post Office, Manchester.
- Ralph Pocklington, Alderman, Lincolnshire (Holland) County Council.
- Lilian Diana Pollock, Editorial Executive, Ideal Home Magazine.
- Sidney Frank Ponting, Works Manager, Morris Motors Ltd.
- Harold Worthington Potter, Chief Superintendent, Metropolitan Police.
- James Edward Potts, AEA. For services to Boy Scouts in Newcastle upon Tyne.
- Marjorie Ethel Poulton, Grade 4 Officer, Ministry of Labour.
- Deirdre Mary Clotilda Powell, Canteen Manageress Grade B, National Physical Laboratory, Ministry of Technology.
- Joan Bailey Price, lately Principal, School of Nursing, United Sheffield Hospitals Board of Governors.
- George Arthur Priestley. For political and public services in Yorkshire.
- Doris Purves, Grade 4 Officer, Ministry of Labour.
- Cherry Quah, Executive Officer (Local), Tengah, Ministry of Defence (Royal Air Force).
- Thomas Raybould. For services to youth in Leek and district.
- Edith Anne Redhouse, Grade 6 Officer, HM Diplomatic Service.
- Blodwen Richards, Honorary Secretary, Rhosllanerchrugog Savings Committee.
- Melville John Richards, Chief Inspector, Santon Ltd, Newport, Monmouthshire.
- Phyllis Richardson, Controller, Secretarial and Typing Services, Diplomatic Service Administration Office.
- William Bertram Rickman, Senior Executive Officer, Ministry of Pensions and National Insurance.
- Francis Charles Ridley, Inspector of Works (Building), Ministry of Public Building and Works.
- Arthur Rigby, lately Mayor of Wenlock, Shropshire.
- Herbert Morrell Roberts, Chief Ambulance Officer, Newcastle upon Tyne County Borough Council.
- William Alexander Robertson, Divisional Civil Engineer, Birmingham, London Midland Region, British Railways Board.
- Kathleen Robinson, JP, Chief Welfare Section Officer, Civil Defence Corps, Merioneth.
- Sydney Arthur Salt. For political and public services in Cheshire.
- Nancy Freda Samman, General Secretary, Bristol Old People's Welfare Incorporated.
- Leonard Sanders, Higher Executive Officer, Ministry of Technology.
- James Arthur Scholes, Superintendent of all Maintenance Departments, Derby Group of Factories, Rolls-Royce Ltd.
- William John Searle, Assistant to the Regional Welfare Officer, Aden, Ministry of Public Building and Works.
- Arthur Shaw, District Officer, HM Coastguard, Board of Trade.
- Arthur Shaw, lately Chief Administrative Assistant, Town Clerk's Department, Stockport.
- Herbert Vincent Shelton, National Savings District Member for Central Suffolk.
- Norman James Brander Shepherd, Chairman, Lower Banffshire Local Savings Committee.
- John Christopher Simpson, JP. For political and public services in Sunderland.
- Thomas Roland Skeels, Chairman, Huntingdon, March and District War Pensions Committee.
- Donald John Skelly, JP. For political and public services in Cardiff.
- Lydia Minnie Slaney, Typist, Board of Trade.
- Albert Frederick Smith, Higher Clerical Officer, Board of Customs and Excise.
- Colin Smith, JP. For political and public services in Belper.
- Courtenay Brennan Smith, BEM, Chairman, Regional Schools Savings Advisory Committee.
- Alderman Cyril Smith. For political and public services in Rochdale.
- Doris Janie Smith, Centre Organiser, Cheltenham, Women's Voluntary Service.
- Herbert Edward Smith, Senior Executive Officer, Ministry of Agriculture, Fisheries and Food.
- Maurice Blake Smithson, Poultry Advisory Officer Grade II, National Agricultural Advisory Service, Ministry of Agriculture, Fisheries and Food.
- Mary Broadmead Fownes Somerville, Regional Organiser, Reading, Women's Voluntary Service.
- William John Hele Sowton. For political and public services in Northfield.
- Lily May Speed, Ward Sister, St. Bernard's Hospital, Southall, Middlesex.
- Stanley Spencer, lately Technical Superintendent (Engineering), No. 27 Maintenance Unit, Shawbury, Ministry of Defence (Royal Air Force).
- Vera Marie Spilling, Inspector of Taxes (Higher Grade), Board of Inland Revenue.
- Samuel Stagey. For political and public services in Staffordshire.
- Harold Leonard Standen, Depot Superintendent, Woolwich Garrison, Ministry of Public Building and Works.
- Alice Stanley, Clerical Officer, Principal Probate Registry.
- Janet Davidson Steele, Administrative Assistant (Private Secretary), North of Scotland Hydro-Electric Board.
- Clement William Stephens, Honorary Secretary, Margate Savings Committee.
- Doris Mary Stephens, Secretary and Treasurer, Plymouth and Devonport Service Division, Soldiers', Sailors' and Airmen's Families Association.
- Dorothy Ailsa Stokes. For services to Lacrosse.
- John William Stonehouse, Chief Officer, City of Lincoln Fire Brigade.
- Muriel Mary Stott, lately Superintendent, Girls' Remand Home, Birmingham.
- Charles William Street, Chief Preventive Officer, Board of Customs and Excise.
- Ernest Saltonstall Stride, Professor of Theory, Royal Marines School of Music, Ministry of Defence (Royal Navy).
- Ita Sullivan, Temporary Clerical Officer, Ministry of Defence (Royal Air Force).
- Albert Edward Sweeney, District Engineer, Liverpool North District, Merseyside and North Wales Electricity Board.
- Elizabeth Jane Sweeting, Administrator and Licensee, Oxford Playhouse.
- Thomas Bryson Telfer, Quantity Surveyor (Main Grade), Scottish Development Department.
- Gertrude Margaret Telford, Senior Assistant Establishment Officer, Commonwealth War Graves Commission.
- Vernon Bentley Temple, DFC, AEA, Group Export Manager, Whitbread and Company Ltd. For services to Export.
- George Albert Thomas, Executive Engineer, London Telecommunications Region, General Post Office.
- Arthur Alexander Thomson, Provincial Sports Writer.
- Marjorie Thornber, JP, County Borough Organiser, Burnley, Women's Voluntary Service.
- Charles Robert Thrower, Higher Executive Officer, Central Ordnance Depot, Chilwell, Ministry of Defence (Army).
- William Alfred George Thrussell, Grade 5 Officer, Ministry of Labour.
- Daniel Carey Tolchard. For services to the agricultural co-operative movement.
- John Charles Toms, Managing Director, C. Toms and Son Ltd, Newquay Dock, Polruan, Cornwall.
- James Totten, Senior Designer and Assistant to the Technical Director, Drysdale and Company Ltd, Glasgow.
- Doris Catherine Trew, Senior Executive Officer, Ministry of Health.
- Margaret Eileen Tulloch, Grade 9 Officer, HM Diplomatic Service.
- Robert Turnbull, Honorary Secretary, City of Edinburgh Local Savings Committee.
- Hubert Francis Turner, JP. For political and public services in Northamptonshire.
- Thomas William Turner, Higher Executive Officer, Board of Trade.
- Mildred Elizabeth Tyler, Superintendent of Typists, Home Office.
- Beatrice Cecilia Underwood, Executive Officer, Department of Education and Science.
- Allan Urquhart, Chief Inspector of Ships' Provisions, Board of Trade.
- Arnold Ernest Veitch, Chairman, Tynemouth, Wallsend and District War Pensions Committee.
- David Alexander Walker, District Inspector, Royal Ulster Constabulary.
- Joseph Herbert Victor Walker, Group Leader, Marine Group, General Electric Company Ltd.
- Wilfrid Arthur Waller, JP, Chairman, National Assistance Appeal Tribunal, Southend.
- Moses Warnock, Managing Director, J. and T. Boyd Ltd, Glasgow. For services to Export.
- Flight Lieutenant Frederick John Warren, Senior Experimental Officer, Marine Biological Association of the United Kingdom, Department of Education and Science.
- Captain William James Wilfred Waters, lately Senior Master, Southern Region, British Railways Board.
- Observer Lieutenant Lewis Watkin, Group Officer, No. 13 Group, Royal Observer Corps.
- Catherine Georgina Watson, Superintendent of Typists, Ministry of Transport.
- Eric Godfrey Webb, Organiser, Cheshire Community Council.
- John Robert Webster, Assistant Chief Constable, Leicestershire and Rutland Constabulary.
- Leslie John Westoby, Engineering Technical Grade I, Electrical Inspection Directorate, Ministry of Aviation.
- Hugh Whitaker, JP, Warden and Headmaster, Holt Hall, Norfolk.
- Philip Ernest White, Assistant Executive Engineer, Post Office Research Station, London.
- Hector Harold Whitlock. For services to Race Walking.
- Florence Constance Wikeley, Senior Executive Officer, Ministry of Pensions and National Insurance.
- Edgar Williams, lately Area Manpower Officer, No. 1 (Swansea) Area, South Western Division, National Coal Board.
- Elizabeth Mary Wilson, Departmental Welfare Officer Grade I, Northern Ireland Command, Ministry of Defence (Army).
- Observer Lieutenant John Wilson, Group Officer, No. 20 Group, Royal Observer Corps.
- Lucy Wilson. For political and public services in Yorkshire.
- Walter Wilson, Inspector of Taxes, Board of Inland Revenue.
- Gordon Jack Sharland Wood, Commandant, Nottingham City Special Constabulary.
- Samuel Wood, Councillor, Lancashire County Council.
- Joan Denise Wright, Secretary and Registrar, Endsleigh College of Education, Hull.
- Alan Yates. For political and public services in Halifax.
- Wilmot Harold Yates, JP, lately Member, Hampshire Agricultural Executive Committee.
- Arthur Joseph Young, Civil Defence Officer, Tempered Spring Company Ltd, Sheffield.
- William Robert Young, Area Manager, Glasgow (Maryhill), National Assistance Board.
- Gerald Ball, Second Secretary (Commercial), Her Majesty's Embassy, Bonn.
- Stanley Roy Barter, Chief Magistrate, Uganda.
- Robert Bell Beattie, Superintendent Engineer of Road, Sarawak, Malaysia.
- Michael Lee Bellow, Deputy Registrar of Co-operatives, Northern Nigeria.
- Joan Ooslwaldina Mary Bird, British subject resident in Morocco.
- Basil Bleck, Information Officer, Her Majesty's Consulate-General, Los Angeles.
- George Joseph Anthony Bolton, lately British Vice-Consul, Ankara.
- James Lewis Bridges, Officer in the High Commission Service, Aden.
- Valeska Gladys Evelyn Muriel Dahl, British subject resident in Denmark.
- Nancy Sawbridge Downes, lately Diplomatic Service Officer, Grade 9, British High Commission, Salisbury.
- Roy Bertram Downing, Water Works Engineer, Aden.
- Elizabeth Ellinger, Diplomatic Service Officer, Grade 9, Her Majesty's Embassy, Rome.
- Donald Scott Ellis, Conservator of Forests, Northern Nigeria.
- Josephine Louise Errard, Clerk, Consular Section, Her Majesty's Embassy, Paris.
- Reginald John Pole-Evans, Divisional Development Officer, Sarawak, Malaysia.
- Margaret Elizabeth Farn, Headmistress, Oporto British School.
- Isabella Watson Cunningham Fimister, Principal, School of Nursing, University College Hospital, Ibadan, Western Nigeria.
- Claude Andre Auguste Vincent Rouquette De Fonvielle, Editor (Technical Press), Information Section, Her Majesty's Embassy, Buenos Aires.
- Edward Charles Francis, lately Forest Cartographer, Sandakan, Sabah, Malaysia.
- Gweneth Margaret Gibson, British subject resident in Chile.
- Sheila Eanswythe Harden, First Secretary, United Kingdom Mission to the United Nations, New York.
- Winifred Mary Joyce Harty, lately Supervisor of Typists, Her Majesty's Embassy, Rome.
- Katharine Sheila Hill, Diplomatic Service Officer, Grade 9, Middle East Command Political Office, Aden.
- Prudence Beatrice Hons, Personal Assistant to Her Majesty's Consul-General, Paris.
- Leslie James Howells, Principal, School of Surveying, Oyo, Western Nigeria.
- William Graham Ingham, Director, Centre of English Studies, Basra.
- David Austin Jenkins, Archivist, Her Majesty's Embassy, Moscow.
- Hasan Khan Akber Khan, Junior Executive Officer, Kamaran, Aden.
- William Ernest Evan Kirkham, Assistant Commissioner of Prisons, Uganda.
- Florence Enid Lammens, British subject resident in Belgium.
- George Edward Grimes Lee, Archivist, Her Majesty's Consulate-General, San Francisco.
- Barry Norman Lewis, Deputy Superintendent, Sarawak Constabulary, Royal Malaysia Police.
- Charles Smith Macdonald, Senior Executive Engineer, Northern Nigeria.
- The Reverend Alexander McVicar, Church of Scotland Minister in Genoa and Administrator of The Sailors' Rest.
- Leonard Frank Haig Marriott, Principal Accountant, Northern Nigeria.
- Kenneth Hugh Marshall, lately District Traffic Superintendent, East African Railways and Harbours.
- Jacqueline Anne Henriette Martinet, Directress, Lausanne Office of British-Swiss Chamber of Commerce.
- Arthur Mascall, Progress Engineer, Northern Nigeria.
- Kenneth David Mason, MB, BS, Principal Health Officer, Western Nigeria.
- Douglas Cecil Maxwell, lately Principal Establishment Officer, East African Railways and Harbours.
- Ivor Illtyd Morgan, Second Secretary (Administration) and Consul, Her Majesty's Embassy, Saigon.
- Ines Maria Murray, Headmistress, Shuwaikh School, Kuwait.
- Albert Frederick Newman, Office Equipment Engineer, Printing Division, Ministry of Internal Affairs, Eastern Nigeria.
- Joseph Patrick Bernard O'Neill, Senior Operations Officer and Airport Commandant, Lagos Airport, Nigeria.
- Neville John Chinery Parmenter, lately Administrative Officer Class I, Northern Nigeria.
- Heather Kathleen Stapleton Phillips, Clerk, British High Commission, New Delhi.
- Maxwell Plowman, British Vice-Consul, Boston. Miss Jean Mary Randall, Secretary, Western Aden Protectorate.
- Arthur Ronald Rencher, Principal Accountant, Northern Nigeria.
- William Rides, lately Plantation Officer, Cocoa Research Institute, Western Nigeria.
- Ian Cameron Robinson, Headmaster, King's College, Budo, Uganda.
- Sydney Graham Ross, Superintendent, Sabah Component, Royal Malaysia Police.
- Sylvia Hope Leith-Ross. For services to Nigeria, particularly in the field of education.
- Seiyib Mahyoub Sultan Saif, Deputy Municipal Secretary, Aden.
- David Purvis Small, Second Secretary, British Deputy High Commission, Ibadan.
- Josephine Edna Spencer, Principal, Gindiri Training College, Northern Nigeria.
- Cyril Robert Pinkney Strachan, Chief Pharmacist, Ministry of Health, Eastern Nigeria.
- Winifred Alice Stevning, British subject resident in the United States of America.
- Joseph Walters, First Secretary, Her Majesty's Embassy, Cape Town.
- Kathleen Pelham Lauder Warren, British subject resident in Malta.
- Cecil Herbert Watson, British subject resident in India.
- John Francis Weale, British Vice-Consul, Athens.
- Dudley Francis Preece Williams, First Secretary, Her Majesty's Embassy, Rangoon.
- Laurence Woodroofe, DFM, lately Municipal Treasurer, Nakuru, Kenya.

State of New South Wales

- John Harnett Bateman. For public services, particularly in the Criminal Investigation Branch of the New South Wales Police Force.
- Mitchell Austen Brown, of Broken Hill. For services to the community.
- Charles McLean Dawson. For services to local government and to returned servicemen.
- Leslie Fitzpatrick, lately Town Clerk of North Sydney.
- Minnie Margaret Freeman. For charitable and social welfare services.
- Geoffrey Alan Johnson. For services to the community, particularly as Chairman of the Burnside Presbyterian Homes for Children.
- Florence Ralston O'Neill. For social welfare services, particularly on behalf of ex-servicemen.
- Edith Jean Parrish. For services to community organisations and the welfare of ex-servicemen and women.
- Jean Shaw, of Broken Hill. For services to the community, particularly on behalf of intellectually limited children.

State of Victoria

- Daphne Lillian Barrett, of Balwyn. For services to Education.
- Vera Bayley, JP, of Ashburton. For political, social welfare and charitable services.
- James Henry Clive Black, of Portarlington. For services to the community, particularly on behalf of ex-servicemen.
- Victoria Ethelberta Carter, Secretary of the Royal Society for the Prevention of Cruelty to Animals.
- Douglas Hemingway, of Balwyn. For his services to the community and to the Field and Game Association of Victoria.
- Councillor William Henry Kaye, of Elmhurst. For services to local government and the community.
- Esme Vivienne Lucas, of Brighton. For services to the community, particularly in connection with the Australian Red Cross Society.

State of Queensland

- William Beak, of North Rockhampton. For his services to the beef cattle industry.
- Major Roy Cooper, ED, of Brisbane. For charitable and community welfare services.
- Frances Fountain, Matron, Toowoomba Hospital.
- Francis Henry Robertson, of Brisbane. For services to the community.
- James Alexander Robinson, DSO, of Brisbane. For services in the field of education.
- Cecil Eric Smith, of Townsville, in recognition of his work for the Church of England and his community welfare services.
- Jessie Marjorie Taylor, of Brisbane. For welfare services, particularly to the Blind.

State of Western Australia

- The Reverend Ernest Aldridge Clarke. For services to the Methodist Overseas Missions, especially at the Moore River Native Settlement, Mogumber.
- Thomas George Davies, JP. For public services, particularly in industrial, educational and cultural fields.
- Catherine Helen King. For services to the community, particularly in the interests of children.
- Gladys Rosalie Locke. For services to the community, particularly in connection with the Young Women's Christian Association.

State of Tasmania

- Mary Walsh, District Nurse, Lilydale District Nursing Centre.
- Charles Vernon Wellard, lately Secretary, Marine Board of Devonport.

Colonial Office

- Michael William Adams, Senior Auditor, Gilbert and Ellice Islands Colony.
- Jean William Gilbert Barallon, Collector of Customs, Seychelles.
- Clement Alexander Bowleg, Headteacher, Western Junior School, Bahamas.
- Olga Brangman. For voluntary services to the community, particularly to the needs of children in Bermuda.
- Alexander Colin Campbell, Principal Ministry of Local Government, Bechuanaland.
- James Horatio Carrott, Administrative Secretary, Ministry of Trade, Production and Labour, Antigua.
- John Lorenzo Christian, Magistrate, Pitcairn Island.
- Lemuel McPherson Christian. For services to musical education in Dominica.
- Muriel Maud Clements. For social services in Swaziland.
- Winifred Coaker. For services to the community in Basutoland.
- James Blackstocks Couper, Estates Manager, Public Works Department, Bermuda.
- John Daniels. For public services in Fiji.
- Abel D'Unienville, Chairman, La Digue Local Board, Seychelles.
- Ada May Edwards, Assistant Inspector of Schools, St. Kitts-Nevis-Anguilla.
- Frederick Arthur Ewins, Ballistics Officer, Hong Kong Police Force.
- Norman Stanley Feltham. For services to shipping in Hong Kong.
- Daphne Ho, Principal Social Welfare Officer, Hong Kong.
- Rose Margaret Johnson. For services to the Girl Guide Movement in Dominica.
- Jacques Henri Julien, lately Horticulturist, Department of Agriculture, Mauritius.
- The Reverend Canon Azarial Nkane Kaka. For public services in Basutoland.
- Mokwadi Tom Mokgabis Kgopo, Principal, Ministry of Labour and Social Services, Bechuanaland.
- Lee Wan-yuen. For public services in Hong Kong.
- Captain Roy William Lowe, Master of the MV Lady Dundas, Bahamas.
- Archibald Mooketsa Mogwe, Principal, Ministry of Local Government, Bechuanaland.
- Hilda Marie Osbourne, Inspector of Accounts, Treasury Department, St. Lucia.
- Alfred Hyacinth Roberts, Headteacher, Petit Martinque Roman Catholic School, The Grenadines Territory of Grenada.
- Betty Mary Slader, Nursing Sister and Lay Evangelist in the Diocese of Polynesia. For social welfare work in Fiji.
- Peter Alexander Smith, Higher Executive Officer, Tsetse Fly Control Department, Bechuanaland.
- George Harry Stokes. For services to youth work in Hong Kong.
- Helin Marion Uttley. For charitable work in Antigua.
- Johannes Lodewyk van der Vyver, Pharmacist, Hlatikulu Hospital, Swaziland.
- Herbert George Victor Ward. Chief Engineer, Royal Research Ship John Biscoe, British Antarctic Territory.
- Darvall Keppel Wilkins, Administrative Officer Class B, British District Agent, Control District No. 2, New Hebrides.

British Guiana

- William George Craigen, JP. Headmaster, Huist Dieren Government School. For services to the Community in British Guiana.
- Hugh Alvin Barrington Massay. For services to sport in British Guiana.
- The Reverend Patrick Alleyne Matthews. For public services and social work in British Guiana.
- Dhanookdharry Ramlakhan. For public services in British Guiana.
- Inez Samuels, Teacher, Clonbrook Government School. For services to the community in British Guiana.
- Barbara Sutherland, Confidential Code Clerk, Governor's Office, British Guiana.

=== Companion of the Imperial Service Order (ISO) ===
Home Civil Service

- Cecil Edward Asher, MBE, Principal Regional Officer, Ministry of Health.
- John Bizley, Chief Executive Officer, Ministry of Pensions and National Insurance.
- Percy Laurence Cavill, Head Postmaster, Reigate and Redhill, Surrey.
- Percival Walter Henry Chapman, Chief Executive Officer, Home Office.
- Alan Francis Crossley, Principal Scientific Officer, Meteorological Office, Bracknell, Ministry of Defence (Royal Air Force).
- Arthur William Deller, Chief Executive Officer, Ministry of Public Building and Works.
- Harry Edwards, Principal Collector of Taxes, Board of Inland Revenue.
- Henry Cecil Gregory, MRCVS, lately Divisional Veterinary Officer, Ministry of Agriculture, Fisheries and Food.
- Douglas Hinshelwood, lately Chief Executive Officer, Ministry of Overseas Development.
- Kenneth John Macrae, Assistant Accountant-General, Board of Customs and Excise.
- Herbert Sidney Mileman, OBE, Assistant Comptroller, National Debt Office.
- Alfred Lumley Mussett, Senior Chief Executive Officer, Cyprus District, Ministry of Defence (Army).
- John Knowles Nicol, Deputy Controller (Clydeside), Scotland, National Assistance Board.
- Gerald Sydney Orpwood, Chief Executive Officer, Ministry of Housing and Local Government.
- Cecil Walton Payne, Statistician, Board of Trade.
- Edgar Leonard Perkins, Telephone Manager, Cardiff Area, General Post Office.
- Edward Albert Petty, Chief Executive Officer, Ministry of Defence (Royal Air Force).
- Gilbert Kent Pollard, Grade 2 Officer, Ministry of Labour.
- William Edward Pretty, Senior Principal Scientific Officer, Ministry of Defence (Royal Navy).
- Janet Helen Renwick, Principal, Scottish Education Department.
- Frederick Arthur Shergold, lately Chief Experimental Officer, Road Research Laboratory, Ministry of Transport.
- Dalby Walter Harry Wickson, MBE, Grade 5 Officer, HM Diplomatic Service.

State of New South Wales

- Harry Keyworth Lipscomb, Commissioner of Stamp Duties.

State of Queensland

- Cecil Emil Petersen, Auditor-General.

State of Western Australia

- Kenneth Joseph Townsing, Under Treasurer.

State of Tasmania

- Alexander Frederick Hannon, Auditor-in-Charge of the Audit of Treasury expenditure, Audit Department.

Overseas Civil Service

- Leonard Alltree, Chief Bailiff, Hong Kong.
- Joseph Edgar Hermans, Accountant-General, Mauritius.
- Robert Hogarth, Controller of Pests, Hong Kong.
- John Alick Charles Hurlbatt, Deputy Accountant-General, Hong Kong.
- Ngan Chung-hon, Traffic Manager, Kowloon–Canton Railway, Hong Kong.
- Clarence Vernon Thompson, Collector of Customs, Cayman Islands.

=== British Empire Medal (BEM) ===
Military Division

Royal Navy

- Chief Radio Electrical Artificer (Air) Donald Charles Anderson, L/FX 668337.
- Chief Petty Officer Writer John Buckley, MX 57183 (formerly serving with the British Joint Services Training Team, Ghana).
- Master at Arms Henry Frank Carpenter, D/MX 640024.
- Chief Petty Officer Cook (S) John Caruana, E/MX 766174.
- Petty Officer Medical Assistant Ronald Watkin Coote, P/MX 777106.
- Chief Communication Yeoman (T.C.I) Charles Norman Cox, P/JX 292908.
- Chief Wren Welfare Worker Betty Ellwood, 18595, Women's Royal Naval Service.
- Chief Radio Supervisor Philip Robert Fleming, P/JX 371656.
- Chief Electrician (Air) Thomas Andrew Graham, L/FX,897200.
- Chief Aircraft Artificer (A/E) Anthony Alan Guttridge, L/FX 100219.
- Chief Petty Officer Stores Accountant (V) George Albert Jacobs, P/MX 46358.
- Chief Petty Officer Stanley Thomas Jefferson, DSM, Q 992574, Royal Naval Reserve.
- Petty Officer (Local Acting Chief Petty Officer) Christopher Brian Jones, P/J 930128.
- Chief Engineering Mechanic Donald Francis Clyde Jones, P/KX 146698.
- Chief Petty Officer Electrician Ronald Edward Kelbrick, D/MX 712301.
- Quartermaster Sergeant James Brian Kilcoyne, PO/X 5399, Royal Marines.
- Petty Officer Steward Ku Yuan Kung, Hong Kong O.I708.
- Petty Officer CD1 David John Lott, P/JX 908651.
- Stores Chief Petty Officer (V) John Donald Marshall, R.38209, Royal Australian Navy (on loan to the Royal Malaysian Navy).
- Chief Engine Room Artificer George Eric Nutton, P/MX 49137.
- Chief Petty Officer (Coxwain) Walter Henry Owen, P/JX 148016.
- Chief Petty Officer (Coxwain) Maurice Edmund Pascall, P/JX 147366.
- Regimental Sergeant Major James Pollitt, PLY/X 4569, Royal Marines.
- Chief Engineering Mechanic Michael Scully, P/KX 96567.
- Engine Room Artificer (1st Class) John George Sheriff, P/M 956459.
- Chief Petty Officer (SPT1) Albert Arthur Taylor, D/JX 153004.
- Chief Radio Supervisor William Charles Tinkler, P/JX 175915 (formerly on loan to the Royal Malaysian Navy).
- Chief Engine Room Artificer James Davie Watt, DSM, P/MX 54789.
- Chief Ordnance Artificer Desmond Percival Whaites, P/MX 56145.
- Chief Electrical Artificer Bertram Wilkinson, P/MX 789649.
- Chief Air Fitter (A/E) Frederick Charles Wright L/FX 814990.

Army

- 22470411 Staff Sergeant Thomas Anderson, The Cameronians (Scottish Rifles).
- MYA/18108275 Sergeant Bin Abdullah Akhirudin, Royal Corps of Transport.
- W/39289 Warrant Officer Class II (acting) Caroline Jane Bosher, Women's Royal Army Corps (now discharged).
- 22524326 Sergeant (acting) Dennis Harold Brooker, Royal Corps of Transport.
- 22291273 Staff Sergeant Reginald Howard Chance, Royal Regiment of Artillery, Territorial Army.
- 23522555 Sergeant (acting) Wilfred Reginald Wilson Cheater, The Gloucestershire Regiment.
- 22654574 Sergeant Alan Chipperfield, The Royal Green Jackets, serving with the British Army Training Team, Kenya.
- 22145096 Sergeant Anthony Charles Clamp, The Staffordshire Yeomanry, Royal Armoured Corps, Territorial Army.
- 19037373 Staff Sergeant Sidney James Coles, Royal Regiment of Artillery.
- 22784756 Staff Sergeant John Cooper Davidson, Royal Corps of Transport, Territorial Army.
- 23221894 Staff Sergeant Norman Hampson, Corps of Royal Electrical and Mechanical Engineers.
- 22919885 Staff Sergeant Leslie Charles Haylor, Intelligence Corps.
- 22308322 Staff Sergeant John Walter Frederick Humphries, The King's Own Yorkshire Light Infantry.
- 22601108 Corporal (acting) Brian Kift, Royal Corps of Transport.
- 22814559 Sergeant Robert James Laughlin, 9th/12th Royal Lancers (Prince of Wales's), Royal Armoured Corps.
- 22564271 Sergeant Percy Edward Leppard, Corps of Royal Electrical and Mechanical Engineers.
- 22823801 Warrant Officer Class II (acting) William Anthony Lyons, Royal Corps of Transport.
- 22542761 Staff Sergeant Albert Macfadden, Royal Corps of Transport, Territorial Army.
- 1157817 Staff Sergeant Stanley Alfred Masson, Royal Regiment of Artillery.
- 19048192 Sergeant Peter Pherozeshain John Minvalla, 5th Royal Inniskilling Dragoon Guards, Royal Armoured Corps.
- 22717696 Staff Sergeant Donald Moore, Corps of Royal Electrical and Mechanical Engineers.
- 22548731 Staff Sergeant Frederick William Nicholas, 10th Royal Hussars (Prince of Wales's Own), Royal Armoured Corps.
- 2549168 Staff Sergeant Tom Elliott Oxley, Corps of Royal Electrical and Mechanical Engineers.
- 14104638 Warrant Officer Class II (local) Albert Parker, The Argyll and Sutherland Highlanders (Princess Louise's).
- 22542375 Staff Sergeant Ronald Gordon Postlethwaite, Royal Corps of Signals.
- 22957086 Sergeant St. John Kenneth Powell, 14th/20th King's Hussars, Royal Armoured Corps.
- 14455543 Staff Sergeant Philip Pudney, The Royal Inniskilling Fusiliers.
- 23551149 Corporal Richard Patrick Purdy, Royal Corps of Transport.
- 22215839 Sergeant Selwyn Neville Rochelle, Scots Guards.
- LS/832974 Sergeant Walter Ernest Scott, Royal Regiment of Artillery.
- 19041399 Staff Sergeant (acting) Douglas David Starkey, Corps of Royal Electrical and Mechanical Engineers.
- 23668601 Sergeant Reginald Frank Thorne, The Dorset Regiment, Territorial Army.
- 23656776 Corporal Alan Wainman, Corps of Royal Electrical and Mechanical Engineers.
- 14448839 Sergeant Thomas Walker, The Royal Green Jackets.
- 22515743 Staff Sergeant Donald Francis Wilson, Royal Corps of Signals.

Overseas Awards

- Sergeant (Assistant Armourer) Yeung Man, The Hong Kong Regiment.
- 22303291 Sergeant (acting) Joseph William Nassau, Federal Regular Army.

Royal Air Force

- L0575001 Flight Sergeant Robert Anderson.
- V4014207 Flight Sergeant Ronald Boxell.
- J1104028 Flight Sergeant George Julius Caron.
- U0650207 Flight Sergeant Frederick Charles Charman.
- L0574166 Flight Sergeant Desmond Victor Godfrey.
- B0538533 Flight Sergeant Gordon Frederick John Hutson.
- P0639731 Flight Sergeant Roland Thomas Jones.
- U0922124 Flight Sergeant Roy William Charles Jones.
- F4053365 Flight Sergeant (Acting Warrant Officer) Ernest Arthur Kinnear.
- N4006563 Flight Sergeant James John Cornelius McStravick.
- W0531796 Flight Sergeant Charles Murray.
- G3033656 Flight Sergeant Alexander George Pine.
- N0571893 Flight Sergeant William Ross, (for services while on loan to the Royal Malaysian Air Force).
- L0535112 Flight Sergeant James Whitworth.
- A0585750 Chief Technician Gerald Anthony Chessum, (for services with the British Joint Services Training Team, Ghana).
- J3502255 Chief Technician Gerard Fearon.
- A4002370 Chief Technician Thomas Derek Green.
- T4005821 Chief Technician James Harland.
- P0578100 Chief Technician Robert William Jones.
- Q1180101 Chief Technician Ronald James King.
- M1554113 Chief Technician Oliver Arnold Kirk.
- HI068373 Chief Technician Robert Frederick Lucas.
- D0569682 Chief Technician Robert Wilson Morrice.
- Y0569448 Chief Technician John Rowland Rees.
- M3105488 Chief Technician Leslie Richard Stephenson.
- G0620126 Chief Technician Thomas Eric Taylor.
- S4109078 Sergeant Maurice Leslie Bartlett, (for services while on loan to the Royal Malaysian Air Force).
- W4151764 Sergeant William Albert Barton, Royal Air Force Regiment.
- N2784555 Sergeant Derek Stanley Clarke.
- H4033669 Sergeant Jack Faulkner.
- Y0993012 Sergeant James Massey.
- A4159693 Sergeant Albert Benjamin Pignatelli.
- C4014622 Sergeant Albert William Henry Scriven.
- P3149695 Corporal John McKenzie.
- N4002774 Corporal Thomas Maurice Newham.
- W0683796 Corporal Brian Joseph Toynton.
- G4254264 Corporal David James Willson.
- N1938206 Junior Technician Iain Grant MacPherson.

Civil Division

United Kingdom

- David Weir Adams, Head Messenger, Editorial Department, Belfast Telegraph.
- Sayed Abbas Ali, Clerk Grade I, No. 114 Maintenance Unit, Aden, Ministry of Defence (Royal Air Force).
- George Edward Allen, Skilled Labourer, HM Dockyard, Chatham.
- Annie Plummer Angell, Collector, Street Savings Group, St. Marylebone, London W.I.
- Leonard Arthur Angell, Colliery Deputy, Underground Training Area, Valley Training Centre, National Coal Board.
- Hilda Arnull, Manageress of Barnet Sea Cadet Corps Unit Canteen.
- Walter Atkinson, Master Greasemaker, Mobil Company.
- Thomas William Bailey, Station Warden, Biggin Hill, Ministry of Defence (Royal Air Force).
- William George Albert Bailey, Company Rescue Officer, Civil Defence Corps, Portsmouth County Borough.
- Herbert John Barton, Inspector of Royal Park-Keepers, Central Parks, Ministry of Public Building and Works.
- Frederick Thomas Bates, Photoprinter Grade I, Diplomatic Service Administration Office.
- John Bates, Boatswain, SS Hector, Alfred Holt & Co. Ltd.
- Neil Campbell Beattie, Assistant Commandant, Corbridge Detachment, British Red Cross Society.
- Lily Florence Bellamy, Precision Inspector, Lucas Gas Turbine Equipment Ltd.
- Frank Thomas Bickley, Chargehand, Stewarts and Lloyds Ltd, Bilston Iron and Steel Works.
- Lily Carola Binnington, Deputy County Borough Organiser, Hull, Women's Voluntary Service.
- Kate Maud Birch, Welfare Section Officer, Civil Defence Corps, Southend-on-Sea County Borough.
- Charles Edward Blakemore, Senior Paper-keeper, Scottish Record Office.
- Albert Edward Borrington, Warrant Officer, No. 1360 (Stapleford and Sandiacre) Squadron, Air Training Corps.
- Helen Margaret Bott, Voluntary hospital worker, Stockton-on-Tees.
- Francis George Bowditch, General Foreman, Taunton, Western Region, British Railways Board.
- Arthur Dalrymple Pollard Boyd, Senior Overman, South Northumberland Area, Northumberland and Durham Division, National Coal Board.
- John Brearley, Station Warden, Stanbridge, Ministry of Defence (Royal Air Force).
- Herbert Brennan, Machine Tool Setter, Associated Electrical Industries (Manchester) Ltd.
- Albert Smith Brewer, JP, Foreman, Lancashire Steel Manufacturing Co. Ltd, Irlam.
- Thomas William Broadbent, Head Foreman Loftsman, Hawthorn Leslie & Co. Ltd.
- Ernest Claude Brooks, Caretaker, Territorial Army Centre, Norton, Stockton-on-Tees.
- Charles Sydney Brown, Foreman, Packing Department, Hilger & Watts. For services to Export.
- Thomas Alfred Brown, Coast Preventive Man, Ardrishaig, Board of Customs and Excise.
- Roseanna Bunker, Overlooker, Army School of Catering, Ministry of Defence (Army).
- Henry Burns, Process and General Supervisory Grade II, Royal Radar Establishment, Ministry of Aviation.
- Walter Henry Cale, Chargehand Electrician, Worcester District, Worcestershire Area, Midlands Electricity Board.
- Ella M. Cave, Matron, The Priory Children's Home, Selkirk.
- Edgar Claude Wellington Chalfont, Hospital Chief Officer, Class I, HM Prison, Wormwood Scrubs.
- Kam Hon Chan, Local Chargeman of Trades, Singapore, Ministry of Defence (Royal Navy).
- James Clark, Lately Assistant Works Manager (Engineering), Duke & Lowson Ltd.
- Daniel Thomas Clarke, Sergeant, Royal Ulster Constabulary.
- Joseph Coleiro, Fuelling Assistant, Naval Store Department, Malta, Ministry of Defence (Royal Navy).
- Leslie Arthur Collyer, Technical Grade II, National Gas Turbine Establishment, Pyestock, Ministry of Aviation.
- Herbert Charles Coplin, Wireless Operator, Deep Sea Trawlers.
- Thomas William Croft, Head Porter, Staff College, Camberley, Ministry of Defence (Army).
- Frederick Victor Willis Crook, Commandant, Wallasey Borough Special Constabulary.
- Ivy Constance Crouch, Housemother, Berkshire County Council.
- Samuel Dack, Head Foreman Shipwright, Smith's Dock Co. Ltd.
- George Dawson, Head Foreman Fitter, Swan, Hunter & Wigham Richardson Ltd.
- Charles Deamer, Chief Inspector and Chief Driving Instructor, Sheffield Transport Department
- Helen B. Dickson, Savings Group Collector, Lanarkshire.
- Henry Edward Lindon Down, Signalman, Special Class 'A', Bristol, British Railways Board.
- Ernest Arthur Drew, Auxiliary Postman, Claverley Sub Post Office, Wolverhampton.
- Harry Frederick Dunstall, Works Technical II (C), Ministry of Public Building and Works.
- Sidney Harold Dymond, Supervisory Foreman, Devon County Council.
- Frank George Earley, Bus Driver, London Transport Board.
- Ernest Henry Eastaugh, Foreman of Trades (Building), Ministry of Public Building and Works.
- William Frederick Edwards, Technical Grade II (M. & E.), Ministry of Public Building and Works.
- Kitty Eppy, Waitress, Members' Tea Room and Members' Cafeteria, House of Commons.
- Donald Evans, Special Craftsman Chargehand, Aeroplane and Armament Experimental Establishment, Boscombe Down, Ministry of Aviation.
- John Flockton, General Plant Foreman, Armstrong Cork Co. Ltd, Gateshead.
- Cecil Maurice Frampton, Farm Manager, Grade 1, HM Prison, Dartmoor.
- John Eraser, Postman, Post Office, Banchory.
- Culvenor Gibson, Sub-District Commandant, Ulster Special Constabulary.
- Margaret Lilian Gilkes, Post Warden, Civil Defence Corps, Birmingham.
- Wilfrid Glover, Youth Leader, Hickleton Main Youth Club.
- Bertram Ernest Good, Model Shop Superintendent, Research & Development, E.M.I. Electronics Ltd, Hayes.
- Maurice Charles Greenwood, Yard Foreman, Reading Gas Works, Southern Gas Board.
- Charles Richard Hamley, Technical Officer, Telephone Manager's Office, General Post Office, Oxford.
- James Hampson, Principal Photographer, Royal Aircraft Establishment, Bedford, Ministry of Aviation.
- Cecilia Nora Hampton, Senior Chief Supervisor, International Telephone Exchange, General Post Office.
- George Arthur Hampton, Assistant Instructor, Home Office Civil Defence School, Easingwold.
- Stanley Alfred Hankin, Head Gardener, France, Northern Region, Commonwealth War Graves Commission.
- Richard Harding, lately Donkeyman, SS Windsor Castle, British & Commonwealth Shipping Co. Ltd.
- Betty Hartnoll, Centre Organiser, Tavistock, Women's Voluntary Service.
- Edwin Maurice Hawkins, Senior Commissionaire, Bristol, British Broadcasting Corporation.
- Dorothy Eileen Mea Hawthorn, Centre Organiser, Godstone Rural District, Women's Voluntary Service.
- Bernard Hazelby, Pit Inspector, No. 1 Area, East Midlands Division, National Coal Board.
- Winifred Rosa Hiles, Welfare Supervisor, City of Oxford Motor Services Ltd.
- Dora May Hill, Reproduction Grade Bill, Ordnance Survey, Ministry of Land and Natural Resources.
- Ernest Hinks, Mechanisation Team Leader, No. 7 Area, East Midlands Division, National Coal Board.
- Henry Edward Hinton, Chief Ship's Cook, MV Port Melbourne, Port Line Ltd.
- John Henry Hopkins, Clerk of Works Technical Class Grade III, Atomic Energy Establishment, Winfrith, United Kingdom Atomic Energy Authority.
- Eric John Harvey Horrell, General Foreman, Edmund Nuttall, Sons & Co. (London) Ltd., Civil Engineering Contractors.
- James Hoyle, Head Observer, Post 21/H.2, Royal Observer Corps.
- Lilian Gertrude Hunt, Sub-Postmistress, Lockeridge Sub Post Office, Marlborough, Wiltshire.
- George Hunter, Chief Inspector, Middlesbrough Constabulary.
- George Wilfred Inwood, Instructional Officer, Grade 3, Government Training Centre, Slough, Ministry of Labour.
- Edwin Jackson, Technical Officer, Telephone Exchange, Scunthorpe, General Post Office.
- William Edward Jackson, Driver M.T, Ministry of Defence (Royal Navy).
- George Henry Jakins, Blind Telephonist, Guildford Divisional Office, Ministry of Agriculture, Fisheries and Food.
- Leslie Albert Jeffries, Technical Works Engineer II, Government Communications Headquarters, Foreign Office.
- Roy Francis Jessup, Senior Chargehand, Peter Lind and Company Ltd.
- George Samuel Jones, Deputy, Hafodyrynys Colliery, No. 6 (Monmouthshire) Area, South Western Division, National Coal Board.
- Lilian Eleanor Jones, Cook-caterer, Hereford College of Education, Hereford.
- Sarah Ann Jones, Collector, Street Savings Group, Blaenavon.
- Thomas Aubrey Jones, Foreman Carpenter, British Waterways Board.
- Edward Robert Kerr, Land Preventive Man, Newry, Co. Down, Board of Customs and Excise.
- Edwin Keyes. Lately Divisional Foreman, Benton Division, Northumberland County Council.
- William George Lacey, Foreman Shipwright, Cammell Laird and Co. (Shipbuilders & Engineers) Ltd, Birkenhead.
- William Rufus Lishman, Principal Door-keeper, House of Commons.
- John Lucas Lloyd, Engraver, The Stourbridge Glass Co. Ltd.
- Stanley John Lobb, Apprentice Supervisor, Westland Aircraft Ltd, Yeovil.
- Edith Lowther, Cutting Room Operative, Ramar Dresses Ltd.
- Kenneth Henderson Macarthur. For services to the control of Roe Deer in Scotland.
- John McClurg, Leading Fireman, Lanarkshire Area Fire Brigade.
- Archibald MAcDonald, Chief Warden, Cairngorms National Nature Reserve, Ministry of Education and Science.
- James Henderson Macdonald, Senior Outside Foreman, Brown Brothers & Co. Ltd, Edinburgh.
- John Macleod, Motor Mechanic, Stornoway Motor Lifeboat, Royal National Life-Boat Institution.
- Leonard Thomas Mann, Technical Officer II, Office of the Receiver for the Metropolitan Police District.
- Albert Edward Mansfield. Lately Pierman, Woolwich Ferry, Greater London Council.
- Douglas Nicol Marr, Head Foreman, John M. Henderson & Co. Ltd, Aberdeen.
- Arthur Henry Martin, Assistant Divisional Officer, Cardiff Fire Brigade.
- Mary Margaret Meggitt, Area Superintendent (Nursing), No. 1 Area, Duke of Lancaster's District, St. John Ambulance Brigade.
- Joseph Dawber Melling, Chargehand Fitter, Reactor Group, Risley, United Kingdom Atomic Energy Authority.
- Frank William Pearson Montague, Chargehand Firebrigadesman, Weapons Group, Aldermaston, United Kingdom Atomic Energy Authority.
- Elizabeth Rosina Munnings, Collector, Street Savings Group, Newcastle upon Tyne.
- Hugh Murray, Station Inspector (Regulator), Glasgow, Scottish Region, British Railways Board.
- John Murray, Medical Room Attendant, Bearkpart Colliery, National Coal Board.
- Elizabeth Fourmy Mytton, Member of County Staff, Worcestershire Women's Voluntary Service.
- Robert Neil, Repairer, Lothians Area, Scottish Division, National Coal Board.
- Anthony Nixon, Warrant Officer No. 1107 (Leyton) Squadron, Air Training Corps.
- John Edward O'Connor, Company's Sick Visitor, Somervell Bros. Ltd, Westmorland.
- Florrie May Odams, Collector, Street Savings Group, Kingston upon Thames.
- Ellen O'Neill, Savings Group Collector, Ballymena (Co. Antrim).
- Winston Osborne, Station Officer, Auxiliary Fire Service, Leicester.
- Frank Osbourn, Travelling Chief Inspector, North Western Region (Postal Branch), General Post Office, Manchester.
- John Patrick Paine, Charge Hand Gas Fitter, N.E. Gas Board, Hull.
- Dorothy Margaret Parker, Sub-Postmistress, South Parade Town Sub Office, Northallerton.
- Leslie Reginald Parkes, Civil Assistant, attached Ministry of Defence.
- George James Parry, Switchboard Attendant, North Wirral District, Merseyside and North Wales Electricity Board.
- Isabella Paterson, Chief Supervisor (Telephone), Kettering Telephone Exchange, General Post Office.
- Kenneth John Pickernell, Leading Hand Labourer, Headquarters, Tidworth Garrison, Ministry of Defence (Army).
- Frederick James Pickles, Detective Inspector, Metropolitan Police.
- Willie Pierce, Boatswain, British Railways Board, Southern Region.
- Frank Sydney Leaper Plasom, Chief Paper-keeper, Hydrographic Supplies Establishment, Taunton, Ministry of Defence (Royal Navy).
- Arthur Rhodes Pool, Chief Foreman, Lysaght's Scunthorpe Works (Branch of G.K.N. Steel Co. Ltd.).
- Edith Mary Potter, Commandant, Woodstock Detachment, Oxfordshire Branch, British Red Cross Society.
- Jack Quinn, Floor Manager, Samuel Lament and Sons Ltd, Belfast.
- Charles Leonard Range, Caretaker, Zoological Museum, Tring, Ministry of Education and Science.
- Donald Ranson, Engineering Fitter Chargehand, Ministry of Public Building and Works.
- Edward Myles Ranson, Assistant Commandant, Edinburgh Special Constabulary (Mechanised Unit).
- Leslie Mark Reay, JP, Toolmaker, Dowty Group Ltd, Cheltenham.
- Alice Richardson, Superintendent of Cleaners, National Physical Laboratory, Ministry of Technology.
- Bertrand Gordon-Ritter, Deputy Sector Warden, Whitehall Sector, Civil Defence Corps.
- Harry Roberts, Sub-Officer, Lancashire Fire Brigade.
- Martha Ann Roberts, Laundry Worker, Lluesty Hospital, Flintshire.
- Chief Woman Observer Alice Robinson, Post 17/L.4, Royal Observer Corps.
- Leslie William Rooke, Chief Supervisor (M), Central Telephone Exchange, Southampton, General Post Office.
- John Rugg, Farm and Herd Manager at Lindertis, Angus.
- Charles William Rumley, Temporary Sub-Inspector, Willesden, London Midland Region, British Railways Board.
- Sarah Scott, Senior Enrolled Nurse, The Infirmary, Berwick-on-Tweed.
- William Henderson Scott, Outside Foreman, Clarke Chapman & Co. Ltd, Gateshead.
- Joseph Ernest Shear, Foreman Shipwright, Manchester Ship Canal Company.
- John Joseph Martin Shepherd, Foreman Coppersmith, Vickers Ltd, Newcastle upon Tyne.
- Gerald Herbert Sheridan, Engineering Inspector, Belfast, General Post Office.
- John Thomas Shorter, Divisional Foreman, Berkshire County Council.
- Harry Singleton, Chief Lineman, Wilmslow, London Midland Region, British Railways Board.
- Sidney Joseph Slack, D.C.M, Regimental Sergeant-Major, Stonyhurst College, Combined Cadet Force.
- Edward Lester Smith, Meter Mechanician, Surrey Meter Department, South Eastern Electricity Board.
- Richard Smith, Farm Foreman, Mossborough Hall Farm, Lancashire. Henry Solomon, Grade V Messenger, HM Embassy, Paris.
- John Charles Sparrow, Chief Inspector, Hancock & Co. (Engineers) Ltd.
- Duncan Mclntosh Stanners, Senior Warehouse Supervisor, HM Stationery Office.
- David James Steele, Superintendent of Works Grade III, Ministry of Finance for Northern Ireland.
- George Albert Steer, Postal and Telegraph Officer, L.P.R. Civil Defence Central Training School, General Post Office.
- Robert Stirling, Colliery Training and Safety. Officer, Central Area, Scottish Division, National Coal Board.
- Frank Streek Stokeley, Head Messenger, HM Dockyard, Portsmouth.
- Leonard Stones, Electrician, Sheffield District, Yorkshire Electricity Board.
- Dorothy Taylor, Collector, Street Savings Group, Manchester.
- Thomas Templeton, Auxiliary Coastguard, Belfast, Board of Trade.
- Ernest George Thomas, Superintendent of Stores, No. 7 Maintenance Unit, Quedgeley, Ministry of Defence (Royal Air Force).
- Evelyn Thomas, Member of County Borough Staff, Stockport, Women's Voluntary Service.
- James Jackson Thompson, Plater, Barrow Shipyard, Vickers Ltd.
- Stanley James Turner, Photoprinter II Signals Research and Development Establishment, Ministry of Aviation.
- Leslie George Upson, School Staff Instructor, Brighton College Combined Cadet Force.
- Donald Davis Vincent, Foreman of Trades (Building) Cyprus, Ministry of Public Building and Works.
- Adrienne Walker, Savings Group Collector, Dundee.
- John Watson, Head Foreman Turner, Harland & Wolff Ltd, Belfast.
- Alick Edward Webb, Range Worker Grade I Leading Hand, Proof and Experimental Establishment, Pendine, Ministry of Defence (Army).
- Harry White, Storekeeper, Government Training Centre, Southampton, Ministry of Labour.
- Lewis Arnold Bryan White, Station Officer, Braintree Fire Brigade, Essex.
- Claude Hubert Wild, Chief Steward, MV Corsea, William Cory & Son Ltd.
- Arthur Williams, Senior Wire Tester, British Ropes Ltd, Wakefield.
- Lilian Miriam Williams, Sub-Postmistress, Pontnewynydd Sub Office, Pontypool.
- Robert Leslie Williams, Laboratory Mechanic, Ministry of Defence (Royal Navy).
- James Willy, Works Overseer Grade II, HM Stationery Office.
- Jessie Inglis Withers, Supervisor, Weaving Department, James Templeton & Co. Ltd, Glasgow.
- Bernard Christiansen Wood, Cook/Steward, MV Tynewood, Constantine Lines Ltd.
- Adelaide Irene Woods, Deputy Sector Warden, Civil Defence Corps, Herne Bay Sub-Division of Kent.
- Harry Woods, Engineer Technical Grade II, 25 Command Workshop, R.E.M.E, Ministry of Defence (Army).
- Dorothy Joan Wordsworth, Scientific Assistant, Meteorological Office, Ministry of Defence (Royal Air Force).
- Martha Jane Worrall, Collector, Street Savings Group, Kenilworth.

State of New South Wales

- Joseph Thomas Dimmock. For services to the State, especially as representative of employees on the State Mines Control Authority.
- Harold Clemeth Hayes, Botanical Assistant, North Coast Silvicultural Research Organisation, Forestry Commission.
- Alfred Henry Ingram, Officer-in-Charge, Letter Delivery Bureau.

State of Western Australia

Arthur Charles Arthurs, Member of Salvation Army. For community and welfare work.

- Reginald Alfred Beall, General Secretary, Australian Pensioners League.
- Veronica Bowler, Sister of Charity. For services to the poor and needy in Western Australia.
- Joyce Knight. For services to Nursing, especially as a Silver Chain Nurse.

Malaysia

- Angus Macphee, Works Superintendent, Road Construction, Public Works Department, Sarawak.
- Edwin O'Brien, Water Works Superintendent, Public Works Department, Sarawak.

Overseas Territories

- Abdul Rahman Khatib, Senior Clerk, Kamaran, Aden.
- Aurora Editha Walters, Supervisor, Nurse-Midwives, Department of Medical Services, Barbados.
- Moji Gaborone Magetse, lately Batlokwa Tribal Treasurer, Bechuanaland.
- Francis Phiri, School Secretary, Bakgatla Tribal Administration, Bechuanaland.
- Carris Penn, Customs Guard and Airfield Assistant, British Virgin Islands.
- Richard Benjamin, Heavy Equipment and Bulldozer Operator, Public Works Department, Grenada.
- Lai Yuen-ping, Fire Officer Class III, Hong Kong.
- Te Toaiauea Eti, Magistrate, Onotoa Island, Gilbert & Ellice Islands Colony.
- Harold Matthew George, Chief Officer, Prisons Department, St. Lucia.
- Jessie Priddie, Superintendent Health Nurse and District Midwife, Medical Department, St. Vincent.
- John Aleide Barbier, Senior Forest Ranger, Seychelles.
- Alphonso Raymonde Colinet, Boat Captain, Mazaruni Mining District, British Guiana. (Dated 25 May 1966)

=== Queen's Police Medal (QPM) ===
England and Wales

- Reginald Atkins, Chief Constable, Flintshire Constabulary.
- Walter Marshall, Chief Constable, Wallasey Borough Police.
- John Aidan Hastings Gott, MBE, GM, Chief Constable, Northampton and County Constabulary.
- Frank Edger Williamson, Chief Constable, Cumberland, Westmorland and Carlisle Constabulary.
- Gerald Elwyn McArthur, District Co-ordinator, No. 5 District Regional Crime Squad.
- Roy Maxwell Rundle, Chief Superintendent, Devon and Exeter Constabulary.
- Leonard John James, Superintendent, Monmouthshire Constabulary.
- Frederick Ernest Hixson, Detective Superintendent, Metropolitan Police.
- Max Alva Newman, Superintendent, Metropolitan Police.
- Charles James Renshaw, Superintendent, Metropolitan Police.
- Nellie Bohanna, Woman Superintendent, Manchester City Police.

Scotland

- Hugh Mackenzie, Chief Superintendent, City of Edinburgh Police.
- Gerald Patey, Superintendent, Fife Constabulary.

Northern Ireland

- Thomas Gerard McMorrow Keegan, Head Constable, Royal Ulster Constabulary.

British Railways Board

- William Owen Gay, Chief Constable, British Transport Police Force.

State of New South Wales

- Arthur John McCloskey, Superintendent, 2nd Class, New South Wales Police Force.
- Edward Ernest Mabbutt, Superintendent, 3rd Class, New South Wales Police Force.
- Frederick John Hanson, Superintendent, 3rd Class, New South Wales Police Force.
- Allan Richard Pearce, Superintendent, 3rd Class, New South Wales Police Force.
- Frank Bernard Whitehouse, Inspector, 1st Class, New South Wales Police Force.
- John Edwin Gordon Sligar, Inspector, 1st Class, New South Wales Police Force.

State of South Australia

- Stephen Joseph Tobin, Inspector, 1st Class, South Australia Police Force.
- Henry Joseph Breuer, Inspector, 1st Class, South Australia Police Force.

British Guiana

- Carl Benjamin Austin, Assistant Commissioner of Police, British Guiana (with effect from 25 May 1966).

Overseas Territories

- Abdul Malek Abdul Sattar, Senior Superintendent of Police, Aden.
- William Hugh Randal Armstrong, lately Assistant Commissioner of Police, Barbados.
- Norman Garner Rolph, Assistant Commissioner of Police, Hong Kong.

=== Queen's Fire Services Medal (QFSM) ===
England and Wales

Thomas Naylor, Chief Fire Officer, Rotherham Fire Brigade.

- Harold Frederick Chisnall, Assistant Chief Officer, London Fire Brigade.
- William Frederick Hoare, Deputy Assistant Chief Officer, London Fire Brigade.
- Arthur Bloomfield, Chief Fire Officer, Shropshire Fire Brigade.

Scotland

- Andrew Scott, lately Divisional Officer, Grade I, South Eastern Area Fire Brigade.

State of South Australia

- William Frederick Goreham, Supervisor, South Australia Fire Brigade.

Overseas Territories

- St. Clair Clarke, Deputy Chief Fire Officer, Barbados.

=== Colonial Police Medal (CPM) ===
For Meritorious Service

Brunei

- Abu Zar bin Abu Bakar, Senior Inspector, Brunei Police Force.
- Mustafa bin Ahmed, Senior Inspector, Brunei Police Force.
- Eric Maxwell Reynolds, Superintendent, Brunei Police Force.

British Guiana

Dated 25 May 1966.

- Thomas Rudolph Bentham, Sergeant, British Guiana Police Force.
- Oscar Lionel Hobbs, Assistant Superintendent, British Guiana Police Force.
- Ezurick Adolphus Mickle, Acting Inspector, British Guiana Police Force.
- James Alphonso Robertson, Inspector, British Guiana Police Force.
- John Ethan Saunders, Inspector, British Guiana Police Force.
- Dorothy Sills, Woman Sergeant, British Guiana Police Force.
- George Simpson, Acting Inspector, British Guiana Police Force.
- Rupert Gladston Van Gronigen, Deputy Superintendent, British Guiana Police Force.

Overseas Territories

- Gerald Augustus Bartlett, Deputy Superintendent, Royal Bahamas Police Force.
- Boey Kim-lun, Fire Officer Class I, Fire Services, Hong Kong.
- Louis Edouard Marcel Bosquet, Inspector, Mauritius Police Force.
- William Wallace Thomas Caldwell, Superintendent, Fiji Police Force.
- Louis Marcel Carre, Sergeant, Mauritius Police Force.
- Cheng, Tuck-yung, Fire Officer, Class III, Fire Services, Hong Kong.
- John Douglas Clague, CBE, MC, TD, Assistant Commissioner, Hong Kong Police Force.
- Sidney Dixon, Superintendent, Bechuanaland Police Force.
- Faisal Kaid Ali, Deputy Superintendent, Aden Police Force.
- Gerald Alwyn Forrest, Superintendent, Bechuanaland Police Force.
- Jugmohunsing Fulena, Superintendent, Mauritius Police Force.
- Fung Kai-ming, Staff Sergeant Class II, Hong Kong Police Force.
- Abdool Rajack Furzun, Inspector, Mauritius Police Force.
- McFerris Orlando Hanna, Sergeant, Royal Bahamas Police Force.
- John Dyson Hirst, Senior Superintendent, Hong Kong Police Force.
- Huen Hung, Staff Sergeant Class 1, Hong Kong Police Force.
- Francis Graham Jenkins, Superintendent, Hong Kong Police Force.
- Kan Yuet-wing, Staff-Sergeant Class 1, Hong Kong Police Force.
- Maurice Kenneth Lane, District Fire Officer, Fire Services, Hong Kong.
- John Peter Law, Chief Superintendent, Hong Kong Police Force.
- Andrew McKerr, Superintendent, Aden Police Force.
- Mohammed Ebrahim Ahmed, Deputy Superintendent, Aden Police Force.
- Jackson Kufigwa Ndubiwa, Inspector, Bechuanaland Police Force.
- James Nichols, Assistant Superintendent, Royal St. Lucia Police Force.
- Joseph Pierre Henri Perrier, Superintendent, Mauritius Police Force.
- Leslie George Roberts, Superintendent, Royal Bahamas Police Force.
- Howard John Rumbelow, Superintendent, Hong Kong Police Force.
- Alexander Johannes Schouten, Senior Superintendent, Hong Kong Police Force.
- Albert Edward Shave, Senior Superintendent, Hong Kong Police Force.
- John Alfred Sherman, Chief Inspector (Fire Branch), Royal Bahamas Police Force.
- Paul Rupert Thompson, Assistant Superintendent, Royal Bahamas Police Force.
- Gilbert Walter Lloyd Williams, Assistant Superintendent, British Honduras Police Force.
- Yu Ki-leung, Superintendent (Auxiliary) Hong Kong Police Force.

=== Royal Red Cross (RRC) ===
Royal Navy

- Alice Isobel Mitchell, ARRC, Principal Matron, Queen Alexandra's Royal Naval Nursing Service.
- Christina Thompson, ARRC, Principal Matron, Queen Alexandra's Royal Naval Nursing Service.

Army

- Lieutenant-Colonel (temporary) Josephine Paris (215900), Queen Alexandra's Royal Army Nursing Corps.

==== Associate of the Royal Red Cross (ARRC) ====
Army

- Major Gwendoline Rosemary Dawe (408408), Queen Alexandra's Royal Army Nursing Corps.
- Major Brigid Veronica Farrell (440839), Queen Alexandra's Royal Army Nursing Corps.
- Major Tamar Louise Jeffreys-Edwards (274082), Queen Alexandra's Royal Army Nursing Corps.

Royal Air Force

- Wing Officer Tina Jane McNeill (405609), Princess Mary's Royal Air Force Nursing Service.
- Squadron Officer Cicely Hardwick (405682), Princess Mary's Royal Air Force Nursing Service.

=== Air Force Cross (AFC) ===
Royal Navy

- Commander Geoffrey Raymond Higgs.

Royal Air Force

- Squadron Leader Peter Derek Albert Austin (3123578).
- Squadron Leader George Geoffrey Davies (3501382).
- Squadron Leader Ivan Raymond Martin (4055743).
- Squadron Leader Frederick Arthur Trowern (4058982).
- Flight Lieutenant Andrew Emil Gabriel Abczynski (205364).
- Flight Lieutenant William Gordon Holmes (572979).
- Flight Lieutenant Ernest Edmund Jones (3517316).
- Flight Lieutenant William Henry Twist (102976), (for services with the British Joint Services Training Team, Ghana).
- Flight Lieutenant Michael Alwyn Vickers (204669).
- Flight Lieutenant Edmund David Zala (152362).
- Flying Officer Hamish Durward Raynham (4230110).

==== Bar to Air Force Cross ====
Royal Air Force

- Wing Commander Roy Marsden Jenkins, AFC (1652817).
- Squadron Leader Ian Kennedy McKee, AFC (503477).

=== Air Force Medal (AFM) ===
Royal Air Force

- C4080436 Flight Sergeant Clive Philips.
- E3501399 Acting Flight Sergeant Paul Francis Hewitt.

=== Queen's Commendation for Valuable Service in the Air ===
Royal Air Force

- Acting Group Captain Stanislaw Wandzilak, OBE, DFC, AFC.
- Squadron Leader Royston Harry Garwood, DFC (149586).
- Squadron Leader Ralph Edward Harrison, DFC (175012).
- Squadron Leader Robert Geoffrey Ridley (579264).
- Squadron Leader John Alan Robinson (607296).
- Squadron Leader Peter Forsey Rogers (3134401).
- Squadron Leader John Robert Walker (607624).
- Flight Lieutenant David Jonathan McLeod Edmondston (607563).
- Flight Lieutenant Wladyslaw Grobelny, AFC (780566).
- Flight Lieutenant Benjamin Emrys James (583948).
- Flight Lieutenant Peter David Jarvis (3519294).
- Flight Lieutenant Charles Kirkham, DFM (633346).
- Flight Lieutenant William Arthur Langworthy (3516420).
- Flight Lieutenant Roy Philip Mannings (503507), (for services with the British Services Joint Training Team, Ghana).
- Flight Lieutenant Denis Augustine O'Leary (4068836).
- Flight Lieutenant Max Pettey (1606305), (for services while on loan to the Kenya Government).
- Flight Lieutenant Humphrey Morgan John Smith (191782).
- Flight Lieutenant Robert Richard Taylor (3507914).
- Flight Lieutenant Kenneth Martin William Trobe (152670).
- Flight Lieutenant Andrew Finlay Wallace, AFC (130169).
- Flight Lieutenant John Aubrey Williams (579572).
- Flying Officer Joseph Stewart Robert Burns Carter (579980).
- Flying Officer Colin Gerald Ford (4231017).
- C4123931 Flight Sergeant Alan Derek Dunbar.
- C4059932 Sergeant Julian Colin Tasker.

United Kingdom

- Alan Christopher Capper, AFC, Development Test Pilot, Hawker Siddeley Aviation, Ltd, Hawarden Airport, Wales.
- John William Copous Squier, Test Pilot, British Aircraft Corporation (Operating) Ltd, Warton Aerodrome, Preston.

== Australia ==
=== Knight Bachelor ===
- Alfred Norman Armstrong, CBE, of Sydney. For services to banking and export.
- Samuel Owen Jones, of Bellevue Hill. For services to industry and export.
- Walter Osborn McCutcheon, of Melbourne. For services to architecture.
- Angus Johnston Murray, OBE, MB, FRCS, Ed., President, Australian Medical Association.
- Henry Beaufort Somerset, CBE, Chancellor, University of Tasmania.

=== Order of the Bath ===
==== Companion of the Order of the Bath (CB) ====
Military Division

- Major-General Charles Hector Finlay, CBE, (225), Australian Staff Corps.

=== Order of Saint Michael and Saint George ===
==== Companion of the Order of St Michael and St George (CMG) ====
- Professor Adolphus Peter Elkin, of Lindfield, New South Wales. For services to Australian anthropology.
- Rex De Charembac Nan Kivell. For services to the Australian National Library.
- Norman George Wilson, Chairman, Board of Management for Production, Department of Supply. For public services, particularly to industry.

=== Order of the British Empire ===
==== Knight Commander of the Order of the British Empire (KBE) ====
Military Division

- Air Marshal Alister Murray Murdoch, CB, CBE, Royal Australian Air Force.

Civil Division

- Brigadier Eugene Gorman, CBE, MC, QC, of Melbourne, Victoria. For public services, particularly to the dried fruits industry.
- Arthur James Lee, CBE, MC, National President, The Returned Sailors', Soldiers', and Airmen's Imperial League of Australia.

==== Commander of the Order of the British Empire (CBE) ====
Military Division

- Commodore James Maxwell Ramsay, DSC, Royal Australian Navy.
- Brigadier John Charles Bendall, OBE, (351), Royal Australian Electrical and Mechanical Engineers.
- Air Commodore Jack William Charles Black, OBE, Royal Australian Air Force.

Civil Division

- Lady Rachel Cleland, MBE, President, Red Cross Society and the Girl Guides Association in the Territory of Papua and New Guinea.
- The Reverend Charles Kingston Daws, ED, Chaplain-General of the Methodist Church of Australia.
- Samuel Landau, OBE, Secretary, Department of the Navy, Canberra.
- Arthur George Lowndes, of Sydney, New South Wales. For public services, especially as a Member of the Australian Broadcasting Commission.
- Ewen Daniel McKinnon, of Linton, Victoria. For political and public services.
- Edmund Bede Maker, of Caloundra, Queensland. For political and public services.
- James Ferguson Nimmo, OBE, Secretary, Department of Housing, Canberra.
- Harold Wenham Robinson. For services to government and industry, particularly as Employers' Representative, Ministry of Labour Advisory Council.
- Colin Arthur Roderick, Professor of English, Townsville University College, Queensland. For his contribution to Australian literature.

==== Officer of the Order of the British Empire (OBE) ====
Military Division

- Commander John Darcy Shelley, VRD, Royal Australian Naval Volunteer Reserve.
- Colonel Eric Ryder Baldwin, ED, (3117273), Royal Australian Engineers.
- Lieutenant-Colonel Russell George Patrick St Vincent McNamara (2270), Australian Staff Corps.
- Colonel Peter Lumsden Tancred (282), Australian Staff Corps.
- Wing Commander Charles Norman Geschke (033159), Royal Australian Air Force.
- Wing Commander John Stewart Latham (023880), Royal Australian Air Force.

Civil Division

- Daniel Sidney Aarons, of Sydney, New South Wales. For public services.
- Captain Lewis Robert Ambrose, Manager, Western Division, Qantas Empire Airways Ltd.
- Harold David Anderson, Her Majesty's Australian Ambassador and Minister Plenipotentiary to Viet Nam.
- John Arthur (Jack) Brabham. For services to international motor-car racing.
- Lindsay Brownfield Brand, First Assistant Secretary, Loans and Investment Branch, Department of the Treasury, Canberra.
- Gladys Selby (Jim) Buntine, MBE, Chief Commissioner, Girl Guides Association of Australia.
- Elizabeth Durack, of Perth, Western Australia. For services to art and literature.
- Monsignor Bartholemew Joseph Frawley, of Scarborough, Queensland. For services to education.
- Henry Norman Giles, of Adelaide, South Australia. For services in the export industry, banking and to the Government.
- Bertram Charles Goodsell, of Port Moresby, Territory of Papua and New Guinea. For public services.
- Superintendent James Hamilton, Commonwealth of Australia Police Force. For his services as Police Adviser to the Commander, United Nations Forces, Cyprus.
- Ernest George Hoy, of Sydney, New South Wales. For services to primary industry, particularly as a Member of the Australian Wheat Board.
- Brian Farquhar Jones, Deputy Director-General, Postmaster-General's Department, Victoria.
- Felix Cameron Nordeck, First Assistant Commissioner, Public Service Board, Canberra.
- Arthur Grimaldi Perry, of Shepparton, Victoria. For services to primary industry, particularly as a Member of the Australian Apple and Pear Board.
- Joseph Mozart Post, Director, New South Wales Conservatorium of Music.
- Evan Sawkins, Deputy Director-General, Postmaster-General's Department, Victoria.
- Philip Roy Searcy, Australian Senior Trade Commissioner, Hong Kong.
- Reginald Vernon Sewell, President, Australian Wool and Meat Producers' Federation.
- William Jack Desmond Shaw, of Gladstone, Queensland. For services to the pastoral industry.
- Margaret (Peggy) van Praagh, of Melbourne, Victoria. For services to Australian ballet.
- Frederick Munro Wiltshire, of Melbourne, Victoria. For public services, particularly to the manufacturing industry.

==== Member of the Order of the British Empire (MBE) ====
Military Division

- Engineer Lieutenant Commander (Acting) John Kevin McNamara, Royal Australian Navy.
- 2107438 Warrant Officer Class II Owen Alfred Bradley, Royal Australian Artillery.
- 51534 Warrant Officer Class II William James Bruce, MM, Royal Australian Infantry Corps.
- 373321 Warrant Officer Class II Keith Chivers, Royal Australian Infantry Corps.
- Major Clarence David Kayler-Thomson, MC, (525), Australian Staff Corps.
- 22715 Warrant Officer Class II Arnold James Lane, Royal Australian Army Service Corps.
- Major John Henry Lewis (237568), Australian Staff Corps.
- 3762 Warrant Officer Class I Raymond Stevenson, Royal Australian Infantry Corps.
- Squadron Leader Ernest Arthur Browne (023860), Royal Australian Air Force.
- Squadron Leader William Russell Fisher (025475), Royal Australian Air Force.
- Warrant Officer Ernest Hulbert (A2103), Royal Australian Air Force.
- Warrant Officer William James O'Connor (A151), Royal Australian Air Force.

Civil Division

- Alderman George Samuel Ernest Adams, JP, of Muswellbrook, New South Wales. For services to the community.
- Nance Letchford Barrett, of Alice Springs, Northern Territory. For services to education.
- Charles Edward Bennett, of Dungog, New South Wales. For services to the community.
- William Robert Fossey Bolton, of Toowoomba, Queensland. For services to education and the community.
- Claudia Portia Burton-Bradley, MB, BS, Director of Medical Research, Australian Cerebral Palsy Association.
- Ronald William Clarke, of Heathmont, Victoria. For services to Australian athletics.
- Ross Macpherson Dunn, MB, MS, of Ryde, New South Wales. Senior Specialist (Surgery) Repatriation Department.
- Margaret Nellie Maud Gardner, of Burwood, New South Wales. For services to the dependants of ex-servicemen.
- Charles John Geard, JP, of Kingston Beach, Tasmania. For services to the welfare of ex-servicemen.
- William Walter Gilbert, JP, of Gilberton, South Australia. For services to hospitals.
- Robert Cluny Grantham, of Crookwell, New South Wales. For services to the community.
- Charles James Gwynn, formerly Administrative Officer, Marine Branch, Department of Shipping and Transport, South Australia.
- Dorothy May Hall, Nursing Sister, Pine Creek, Northern Territory.
- Arthur John Hodsdon, of Epping, New South Wales. For services to amateur athletics.
- Rosa Zelma Huppatz, Matron, Royal Adelaide Hospital, South Australia.
- Ronald Dennis Ireland, of Nedlands, Western Australia. For services to the timber industry.
- David Victor Isaacs, Director, Commonwealth Experimental Building Station, Sydney, New South Wales.
- Ivo Athelstone Krippner, of Canberra. For services to migrants.
- Bernadette Long, Assistant Private Secretary to the Prime Minister.
- James Henry McConnell, Engineer, Snowy Mountains Hydro-Electric Authority.
- John McKee, MB, ChM, of Bega, New South Wales. For services to the community, particularly to the underprivileged.
- Jonathan Murray Maclean, MB, of Trangie, New South Wales. For services to the community.
- Frederick Thomas Parsons, JP, of Beaumont, South Australia. For services to ex-servicemen.
- Florence Mary Peterson, Principal of the Nursing Division, Department of Health, Canberra.
- The Reverend Brother Michael Francis Redmond, of Perth, Western Australia. For services to education and youth.
- Edward Boyd Scobie, formerly Assistant Director of Works (Design), Northern Territory.
- Joy Debenham Seager, MB, of Mount Pleasant, South Australia. For services in connection with the treatment of ex-servicemen.
- Lucy Shaw, Principal of Morongo Presbyterian Girls' College. For services to education.
- Donald Franklyn Styles, Assistant Director, Antarctic Division, Department of External Affairs, Canberra.
- Harry Leslie Thompson, MC. For services to the welfare of ex-servicemen in the Territory of Papua and New Guinea.
- Ronald Wilfred Turnbull, Senior Assistant Director-General, Postmaster-General's Department, Victoria.
- William Leslie Walmsley, JP, of East Malvern, Victoria. For services to the community.
- Walter Stanley Watts, of Homebush, New South Wales. For services to the welfare of ex-servicemen and their dependants.
- Alice Whitley, Headmistress, Methodist Ladies' College, Burwood, New South Wales. For services to education.
- Geoffrey Widdowson, of Launceston, Tasmania. For services to ex-servicemen.
- Harold Williams, of Mosman, New South Wales. For services to music.

=== Companion of the Imperial Service Order (ISO) ===
- William George Baglin, Deputy Commissioner of Taxation, South Australia.
- George Patrick Byrne, Deputy Crown Solicitor, Commonwealth Crown Solicitors Office, Attorney-General's Department, Melbourne.
- Walter Ian Emerton, Secretary, Joint House Department, Commonwealth Parliament, Canberra.
- William Doyle Fanning, Senior Assistant Parliamentary Draftsman, Attorney-General's Department, Canberra.
- Maxwell Ralph Jacobs, Director-General, Forestry and Timber Bureau, Department of National Development, Canberra.
- James James, MBE, Deputy Director-General, Head Office, Department of Works, Melbourne.
- Philip Gower Johnston, Deputy Commissioner of Taxation, Queensland.
- Albert Edgar O'Brien, Commonwealth Industrial Registrar, Attorney-General's Department, Melbourne.

=== British Empire Medal (BEM) ===
Military Division

- Master-at-Arms Arthur Jack Cusick, R.21603, Royal Australian Navy.
- Chief Electrician (Weapons Electronic) Victor George Frederick Hansen, Royal Australian Navy.
- Chief Radio Supervisor Desmond Davie McGowan, R.35553, Royal Australian Navy.
- 13331 Sergeant James Murphy Edwards, Royal Australian Infantry Corps.
- 21633 Staff Sergeant Malcolm Sydney Fennell, Royal Australian Army Medical Corps.
- 41449 Warrant Officer Class II (temporary) Raymond Bernard Keane, Royal Australian Artillery.
- 860204 Sergeant Francis Phillip Vernon Robb, Royal Australian Infantry Corps.
- 24105 Sergeant Sydney Mervyn Webster, Royal Australian Infantry Corps.
- A32623 Flight Sergeant Clarence Leonard Fahey, Royal Australian Air Force.
- A31026 Flight Sergeant John Fraser Hirst, Royal Australian Air Force.
- A36283 Corporal Ivan Grosvenor Hawthorn, Royal Australian Air Force.
- A33352 Corporal Noel Kenneth White, Royal Australian Air Force.

Civil Division

- Bagita, Sergeant First Class, Papua and New Guinea Constabulary.
- Jane Mary Bernays. For services to the community.
- Merle Brockhoff. For services to the community.
- Raymond Coppin, Driver to the Prime Minister of the Commonwealth of Australia.
- Mary Vivian Cornish, former Postmistress of Red Range.
- Dorothy Gairn, Typist-in-charge, Department of Immigration, Sydney.
- Hazel Mary Godlee. For services to the welfare of young women.
- Robert John Hamilton, Senior Technical Officer, Engineering Division, Postmaster-General's Department, Adelaide.
- Herbert Stanley Ilton, Motor Driver, Department of Supply, Melbourne.
- Ida Jane Beatrice Isaacs, Secretary to the Chairman of the Board, Qantas Empire Airways, Limited.
- Fred Stockton Lines, formerly temporary Stores Manager, Department of Works, Woomera.
- Frederick John Lingard, Foreman Grade 2, Royal Australian Navy Torpedo Establishment, Sydney.
- Eva Lloyd. For services to the community.
- Jacob Andrew Lollback, former non-official Postmaster at Jackadgery, New South Wales.
- William Thomas Shannon Merrilees. For services to ex-servicemen.
- Harold Leslie Newlyn, Supervisor (Tree Surgery), Parks and Gardens Section, Department of the Interior, Canberra.
- Ive Beatrice Odewahn. For services to the community.
- Sydney George Riddle, Speaker's Attendant, House of Representatives, Commonwealth Parliament, Canberra.
- Phyllis Margery Silverlock, Clerical Assistant Grade 3, Department of the Navy, South Australia.
- Doris Speed. For services to the community.
- Hazel William Speer, formerly Officer-in-Charge, Animal Quarantine Station, Sydney.

=== Air Force Cross (AFC) ===
- Squadron Leader Jack Lewis Ingate (023852), Royal Australian Air Force.
- Flight Lieutenant Kevin Joseph Harnetty (033180), Royal Australian Air Force.

=== Queen's Commendation for Valuable Service in the Air ===
- Major (temporary) Neil Hilton Harden (27240), Royal Australian Artillery.
- Squadron Leader Reginald Eugene Gillard (033660), Royal Australian Air Force.
- Squadron Leader John William Green (012192), Royal Australian Air Force.
- Flight Lieutenant Ian Barrington Gration (039436), Royal Australian Air Force.
- Flight Lieutenant Gerald Gunton (0216566), Royal Australian Air Force.

== Sierra Leone ==
=== Order of the British Empire ===
==== Commander of the Order of the British Empire (CBE) ====
Civil Division

- Gordon Eric Hall, Governor of the Bank of Sierra Leone.

==== Officer of the Order of the British Empire (OBE) ====
Civil Division

- Lindis Mary Dolphin, Head of the Department of Classics, Fourah Bay College, University College of Sierra Leone.
- The Honourable Paramount Chief Bai Sherbro Yumkella II, JP, Minister without Portfolio.

==== Member of the Order of the British Empire (MBE) ====
Civil Division

- John Joseph Akar, Secretary, Hotels and Tourist Board, and Director of the National Dance Troupe.
- Paramount Chief William Ignosi Caulker, Bumpe Chiefdom, Southern Province. For public services.
- Winifred Hannah Margaret Horton-Davies. For services to the Nursing profession.
- Olive Vivat Kulu Johnson, Principal Matron, Ministry of Health.
- Kelvin Nicholson, Registrar of Co-operative Societies.

=== British Empire Medal (BEM) ===
Civil Division

- Alfred Patrick Cozier, Customs Officer, Customs and Excise Department.

== Jamaica ==
=== Order of the British Empire ===
==== Commander of the Order of the British Empire (CBE) ====
Civil Division

- Ludlow Murcott Moody, MRCS, MD, JP. For public services.

==== Officer of the Order of the British Empire (OBE) ====
Civil Division

- Oswald Charles Adalbert Buckley, Deputy Collector General.

==== Member of the Order of the British Empire (MBE) ====
Military Division

- Major Basil William Thornton, Jamaica National Reserve.

Civil Division

- Sybil Hill Francis, Assistant Secretary, Ministry of Development and Welfare.
- Clevian Talbot Lewis. For public and voluntary social services.

=== British Empire Medal (BEM) ===
Military Division

- Staff Sergeant Raphael George Tuckett, Jamaica Defence Force.

Civil Division

- Gerald George Morrison, Inspector, Jamaica Constabulary Force.

=== Queen's Police Medal (QPM) ===
- Basil Linton Robinson, Assistant Commissioner, Jamaica Constabulary Force.

== Malawi ==
=== Order of the British Empire ===
==== Commander of the Order of the British Empire (CBE) ====
Civil Division

- Peter Long, OBE, Commissioner of Police.

==== Officer of the Order of the British Empire (OBE) ====
Civil Division

- Philip Bannister, MBE, Commissioner for Veterinary Services.
- John Kay Dougal, General Manager, Malawi Railways.
- Dennis Benjamin Moore, Deputy Commissioner of Police.
- John Foster Rhodes. For public services, particularly as founder President of the National Employers' Consultative Association.

==== Member of the Order of the British Empire (MBE) ====
Civil Division

- Peter Norman Hawker, Private Secretary to the Governor-General.
- Hamish Robertson, Senior Assistant Secretary, The Treasury.

=== British Empire Medal (BEM) ===
Military Division

- 20067 Warrant Officer Class I Harry Bernard, The Malawi Rifles.
- DN 9276 Warrant Officer Class II Uladi Kachola, The Malawi Rifles.
- 42208 Warrant Officer Class II Delias Kwakwata, The Malawi Rifles.
- DN 3985 Warrant Officer Class I Robert Manjomo, The Malawi Rifles.
- 42209 Warrant Officer Class II Isaac Yohane, The Malawi Rifles.

=== Queen's Police Medal (QPM) ===
- Edward Shawley, Senior Assistant Commissioner, Malawi Police Force.
- Douglas George Lomax, Senior Assistant Commissioner, Malawi Police Force.

== Gambia ==
=== Order of the British Empire ===
==== Officer of the Order of the British Empire (OBE) ====
Civil Division

- Henry Arthur Oliver, MBE, Permanent Secretary, Ministry for Local Government, Labour and Lands.

==== Member of the Order of the British Empire (MBE) ====
Civil Division

- Essa Omady Joof, Superintendent of Police.
- Sowdatu Safiatu Mahoney. For public services, particularly as a Member of the Bathurst City Council.

=== British Empire Medal (BEM) ===
Civil Division

- Lang Koto Bojang, Alkali of Brikama.
- Ibrahim Bun Mambanick Jobe, Assistant Collector of Customs.
- Lamin Bakoto M'Boge, Seyfu of Niamina Dankunku.
- John Arthur Nicolls, Acting Senior Surveyor, Survey Department.
