= Anthony Reeve =

British diplomat and ambassador

Sir Anthony Reeve

High Commissioner to South Africa Ambassador (1991–1994)
- In office 1991–1996
- Preceded by: Sir Robin Renwick
- Succeeded by: Dame Maeve Fort

Ambassador to Jordan
- Preceded by: Sir John Coles
- Succeeded by: Patrick Eyers

Personal details
- Born: 20 October 1938 Yorkshire
- Died: 6 November 2014 (aged 76)
- Citizenship: United Kingdom
- Education: Merton College, Oxford

Sir Anthony Reeve, KCMG, KCVO (20 October 1938 – 6 November 2014) was a British diplomat and ambassador.

== Life and career ==
Anthony Reeve was born on 20 October 1938 in Yorkshire, the son of Dorothy (née Mitchell) and Sidney Reeve, a lay Methodist preacher. He was educated at Queen Elizabeth Grammar School, Wakefield and Marling School, Stroud. He matriculated at Merton College, Oxford in 1958 where he read English. After short stints at the Huddersfield glazing firm Heywood-Helliwell Ltd and Blackminster County Secondary School, Evesham, he entered Lever Brothers as a management trainee in 1962.

In 1964 Reeve married Pamela Angus; they had three children, and divorced in 1988; she died in 2007.

In 1965, Reeve joined the Foreign Office; he and his wife spent time studying Arabic at the Middle East Centre for Arabic Studies in Lebanon in the late 1960s. After postings to Abu Dhabi, where he was an assistant political agent, and to Cairo, in 1975 he became a political and military counsellor at the British Embassy in Washington, DC. During his time in the United States he wrote two light-hearted novels, Embassy and A Diplomatic Affair, under the pseudonym James Horbury. In 1979 he was appointed head of the Arms Control and Disarmament Agency at the Foreign Office. Between 1984 and 1988 Reeve served as Head of the Foreign Office's Southern Africa department and as Under-Secretary for Africa.

Reeve was Britain's Ambassador to Jordan between 1988 and 1991, a period that included the First Gulf War. He was then appointed as Ambassador to South Africa, during which time he pressured the government of F. W. de Klerk to discontinue the country’s chemical and biological weapons programmes. In 1994, when South Africa rejoined the Commonwealth of Nations following its transition out of Apartheid, he became High Commissioner from 1994 to 1996.

Reeve retired in 1996. The following year he married Susan Doull, whom he had met three years earlier. In retirement, Reeve took a BA in Humanities with Classical Studies, followed by an MA in Classical Studies, from the Open University.

== Honours ==
In the 1986 Queen's Birthday Honours, Reeve was appointed Companion of the Order of St Michael and St George (CMG). In the 1992 New Year Honours, he was promoted to Knight Commander of the Order of St Michael and St George (KCMG) in recognition of his service as Ambassador to South Africa. On 21 March 1995, he was appointed Knight Commander of the Royal Victorian Order (KCVO). This appointment recognised the 1995 visit to South Africa by Queen Elizabeth II which Reeve, as High Commissioner of the country, was involved in organising.
