= Governor-General of Australia =

Federal representative of the monarch

Governor-General of the Commonwealth of Australia
- Badge

- Flag of the governor-general

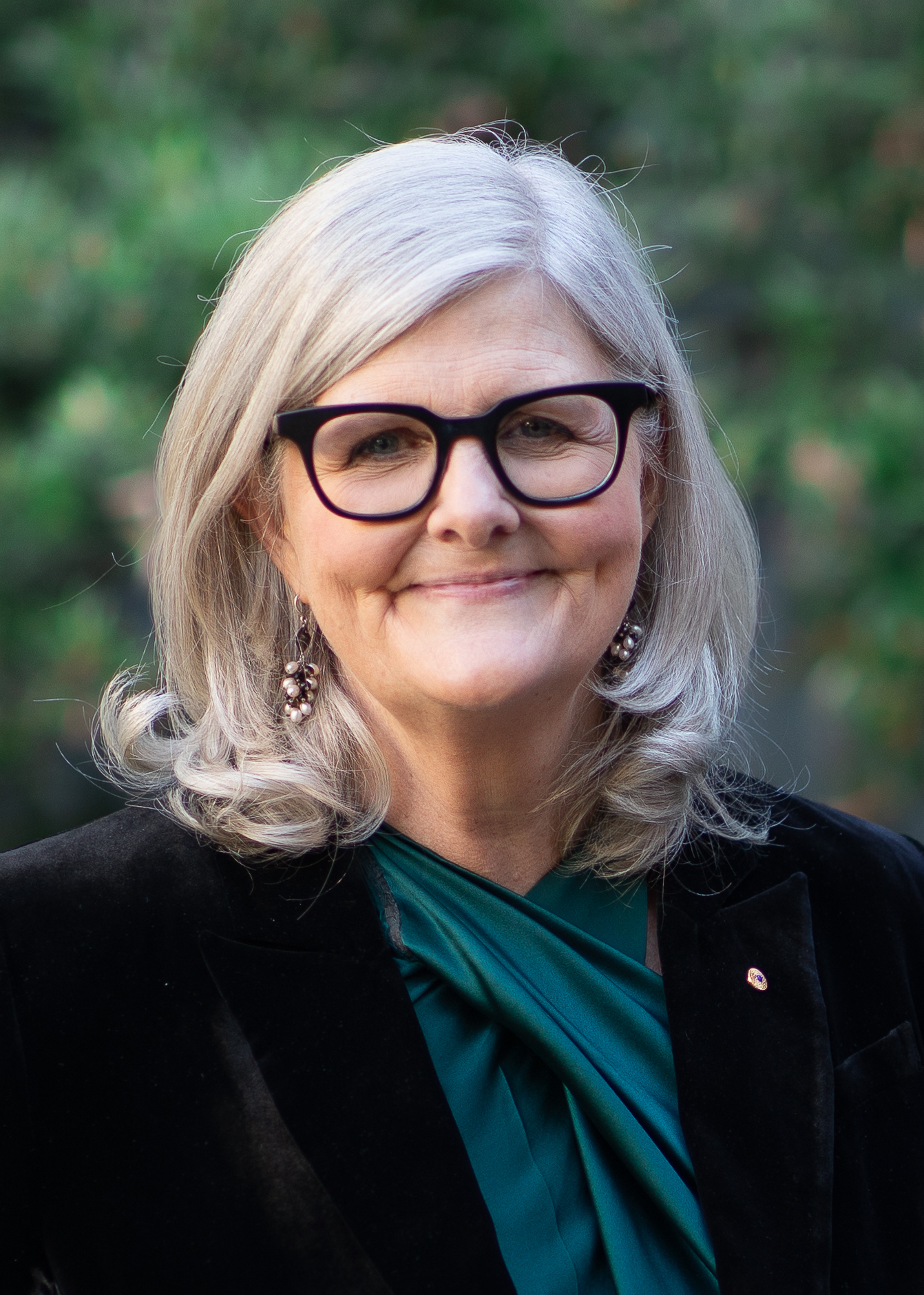
- Incumbent; Sam Mostyn since 1 July 2024
- Viceregal
- Style: Her Excellency the Honourable
- Residence: Government House (Canberra); Admiralty House (Sydney)
- Appointer: Monarch of Australia; on the advice of the prime minister
- Term length: At His Majesty's pleasure; (typically 5 years)
- Constituting instrument: Australian Constitution section 2
- Formation: 29 October 1900
- First holder: John Hope, 7th Earl of Hopetoun
- Salary: $709,017
- Website: gg.gov.au

The governor-general of the Commonwealth of Australia is the federal representative of the monarch of Australia, currently Charles III. The governor-general has many constitutional and ceremonial functions in the Australian political system, in which they have independent agency. However, they are generally bound by convention to act on the advice of the prime minister and the Federal Executive Council. They also have a significant community role, through recognising meritorious groups and individuals, bestowing honours and awards, attending public events, serving as a patron of local organisations, and representing the country as a whole. The current governor-general is Sam Mostyn, who has served in the role since 1 July 2024.

Notable functions of the governor-general include giving royal assent to bills passed by both houses of parliament, issuing writs for elections, exercising executive authority on the advice of the Federal Executive Council, appointing government officials (including the prime minister, cabinet ministers, judges and ambassadors), acting as commander-in-chief of the Australian Defence Force (a largely ceremonial role), and bestowing Australian honours and awards. However, in almost all instances, the governor-general exercises de jure power only in accordance with the principles of the Westminster system and responsible government. This requires them to remain politically neutral and to act only in accordance with the wishes of Parliament (such as when selecting the prime minister and providing royal assent) or on the advice of ministers (when performing executive actions). However, in certain limited circumstances, the governor-general can exercise reserve powers (powers that may be exercised without or against formal advice); this has happened only rarely, most notably during the 1975 Australian constitutional crisis. These situations are often controversial and the use of and continued existence of discretionary reserve powers remains the subject of much debate.

In their ceremonial and community roles, the governor-general represents the nation both at home and abroad. Domestically, this role involves attending services and commemorations, sponsoring community organisations and hosting events at one of their two official residences (Government House in Canberra or Admiralty House in Sydney). Internationally, the governor-general represents Australia by travelling to and attending significant events (such as state funerals) and by performing and receiving state visits. The governor-general is supported by a staff (of 80 in 2018) headed by their official secretary.

The governor-general is selected by the prime minister, but is formally appointed by the monarch on the prime minister's advice. Their term is not fixed, but they typically serve for five years. From Federation in 1901 until 1965, 11 of the 15 governors-general were British aristocrats; however, all governors-general since then have been Australian citizens. (Note: All but one have also been Australian born, with the exception of Sir Ninian Stephen, who had arrived in Australia as a teenager.) The current governor-general, Sam Mostyn, is the second woman to hold the post, the first being Dame Quentin Bryce (2008–2014).

== Appointment ==
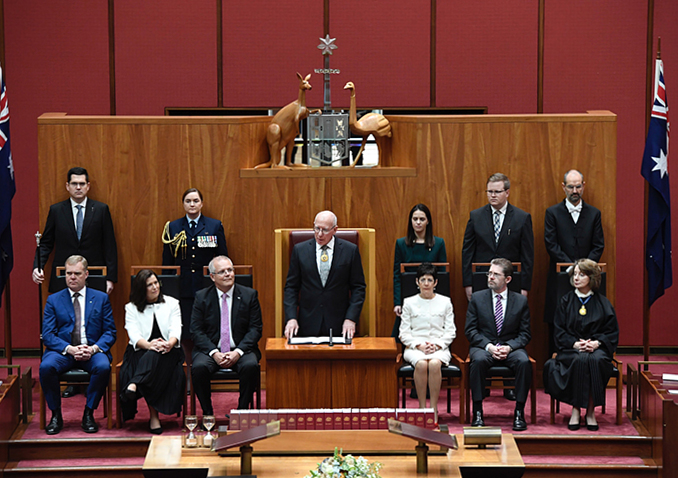
David Hurley (centre) at his swearing-in as governor-general in 2019

The governor-general is formally appointed by the monarch of Australia with a commission made under the authority of section 2 of the Constitution and regulated by letters patent issued by the monarch. When a new governor-general is to be appointed, the current prime minister recommends a name to the monarch, who by convention accepts that recommendation. Prior to the 1940s, the recommendation was made and decided by the Cabinet as a whole. The incoming governor-general is publicly announced usually several months before the end of the existing governor-general's term. After receiving their commission, the new governor-general takes an oath or affirmation of allegiance to the monarch and an oath or affirmation of office. These oaths are administered by the chief justice of Australia or another justice of the High Court. Traditionally, the ceremony takes place in the Senate chamber.

=== Tenure ===
The Constitution does not set a term of office, so a governor-general may continue to hold office for any agreed length of time. In recent decades the typical term of office has been five years. Some early governors-general were appointed to terms of just one year (Lord Tennyson) or two years (Lord Forster; later extended). At the end of this initial term, a commission may be extended for a short time, usually to avoid conflict with an election or during political difficulties.

Three governors-general have resigned their commission. The first governor-general, Lord Hopetoun, asked to be recalled to Britain in 1903 over a dispute about funding for the post. Sir John Kerr resigned in 1977, with his official reason being his decision to accept the position of Australian ambassador to UNESCO in Paris, a post which ultimately he did not take up, but the resignation also being motivated by the 1975 constitutional controversy. In 2003, ex-archbishop Peter Hollingworth voluntarily stood aside while controversial allegations against him were managed, and the letters patent of the office were amended to take account of this circumstance. He later stepped down over the church's handling of allegations of sexual abuse of boys, for which he apologised before the Royal Commission into Institutional Responses to Child Sexual Abuse in 2016. In 1961, Lord Dunrossil became the first and, to date, only governor-general to die while holding office.

A vacancy occurs on the resignation, death, or incapacity of the governor-general. A temporary vacancy occurs when the governor-general is overseas on official business representing Australia. A temporary vacancy also occurred in 2003 when Peter Hollingworth stood aside.

Section 4 of the Constitution allows the monarch to appoint an administrator to carry out the role of governor-general when there is a vacancy. By convention, each of the state governors holds a dormant commission as administrator, allowing the longest-serving available governor to assume the office whenever a vacancy occurs. In 1975, Labor prime minister Gough Whitlam advised Queen Elizabeth II that Sir Colin Hannah, then governor of Queensland, should have his dormant commission revoked for having made public and partisan anti-Whitlam government political statements, in violation of the convention that vice-regal representatives remain neutral and above politics. In May 2023, previous governor-general Sir Peter Cosgrove was specially commissioned to act as administrator due to governor-general David Hurley and all of the state governors simultaneously being absent from Australia to attend the coronation of King Charles III and Queen Camilla.

=== Dismissal ===
A governor-general may be recalled or dismissed by the monarch before their term is complete. By convention, this may only be upon advice from the prime minister, who retains responsibility for selecting an immediate replacement or letting the vacancy provisions take effect. The constitutional crisis of 1975 raised the possibility of the prime minister and the governor-general attempting to dismiss each other at the same time. According to William McMahon, Harold Holt considered having Lord Casey dismissed from the governor-generalship, and went as far as to have the necessary documents drawn up. Casey had twice called McMahon into Yarralumla to give him a "dressing down" over his poor relationship with deputy prime minister John McEwen, which he believed was affecting the government. Holt believed that this was an improper use of his authority, but no further action was taken.

== Constitutional role ==
The governor-general has a key role in performing constitutional duties in all branches of government.

=== Role in the Australian Parliament ===
The Constitution defines the Parliament of the Commonwealth as consisting of the monarch, the Senate and the House of Representatives. However, the monarch's role is no more than titular, with the governor-general responsible under the Constitution for most of the functions undertaken by the monarch in regard to the UK parliament. These include the power to summon, dissolve and prorogue the Parliament, to issue writs for lower house elections, to convene a joint sitting, as well as the power to give royal assent to bills in the monarch's name.

The governor-general also has a ceremonial role in swearing in and accepting the resignations of members of Parliament. All members must make an oath or affirmation of allegiance to the King in the presence of the governor-general or someone appointed by them before they take their seats. On the day parliament opens, the governor-general makes a speech in the Senate (similar to the King's Speech in the UK), entirely written by the government, explaining the government's proposed legislative program.

One of the most significant powers of the governor-general is the power to grant royal assent in the King's name. This assent gives bills that have been passed by the houses of parliament the force of law, with effect either 28 days after being signed, on a date to be fixed later by proclamation or otherwise as provided in the act. The government does not formally advise the governor-general to grant assent, but it is expected that they will act in accordance with the democratically elected houses of Parliament and assent has never been refused.

Apart from assenting to a bill, the governor-general can also reserve a bill for the King's pleasure, that is allow the monarch to give royal assent personally to a proposed bill. When the governor-general acted as a representative of the British government, this provision allowed for the governor-general to refer a bill back to the British government for review, which would then advise the monarch whether or not to grant assent. The British government could also advise the monarch to disallow a law passed within the last two years, which would annul the law on the governor-general's proclamation or message to the houses. However, since the assumption of full sovereignty and the emergence of an independent Crown of Australia, the British government no longer has these powers and the reservation power has only occasionally been used for bills that affect the monarch personally, such as the Royal Styles and Titles Act (1953 and 1973) and other bills of national significance such as the Flags Act 1953 and the Australia Act 1986.

Finally, the governor-general can refer a bill back to the houses with suggested changes. This has only happened when once passed, the government has realised a bill requires further amendment and requests the governor-general return the bill to the house.

=== Role in executive government ===
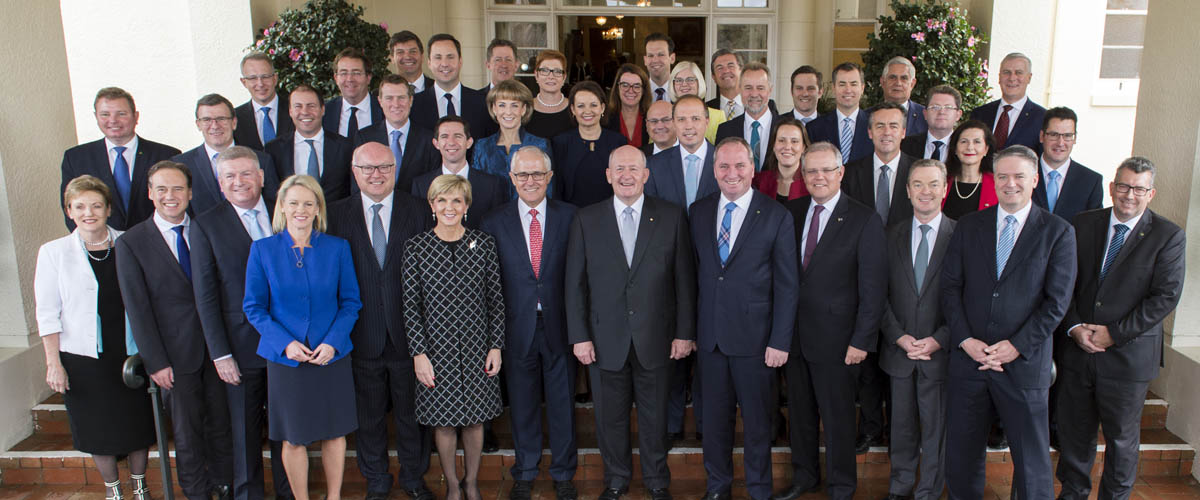
Governor-General Peter Cosgrove with ministers and parliamentary secretaries of the Second Turnbull ministry, 2016

Under the Constitution, the executive power of the Commonwealth is vested in the monarch, but is exercisable by the governor-general. However, such power is only exercised on the advice of ministers in accordance with the principles of responsible government. This occurs formally through the Federal Executive Council, a body of all current (and technically former) ministers that advises the governor-general. Such advice is generally the result of decisions already made in Cabinet, the de facto highest executive body in Australia. While some provisions in the Constitution refer to the "Governor-General" and others to the "Governor-General in Council", this does not mean that there is in element of discretion in the former; this distinction merely indicates that the former powers were those that were historically classified as belonging to the prerogative of the monarch alone.

Many executive powers are also bestowed on the governor-general by statute. This allows the government of the day (acting through the governor-general) to perform certain acts that would otherwise require legislation. Such provisions are often made for situations where legislating may be too slow; for example for the declaration of and response to emergencies. An example this was the declaration on the advice of the health minister of a human biosecurity emergency under the Biosecurity Act 2015 in March 2020, due to the outbreak of the COVID-19 pandemic.

Formally, the governor-general may exercise the traditional rights of the monarch as identified by Bagehot: the right to be consulted, to encourage and to warn. However, the practical ability to exercise this right is limited. Unlike in Canada or the UK, there is no tradition of regular weekly meetings between the governor-general and the prime minister, with meetings instead sporadically held at the request of either party. There is at least a theoretically greater capacity to exercise influence at the regular meetings of the Federal Executive Council at Government House. However, this opportunity is practically constrained too: by the large volume of often complex and legalistic materials considered; by the lack of a requirement for those executive councillors (ministers) present to be properly briefed; by the fact that executive councillors may not have sufficient seniority in the government such that warnings or encouragements would be considered; and by the expectation of some governments that the governor-general should act as a rubber stamp.

=== Reserve powers ===
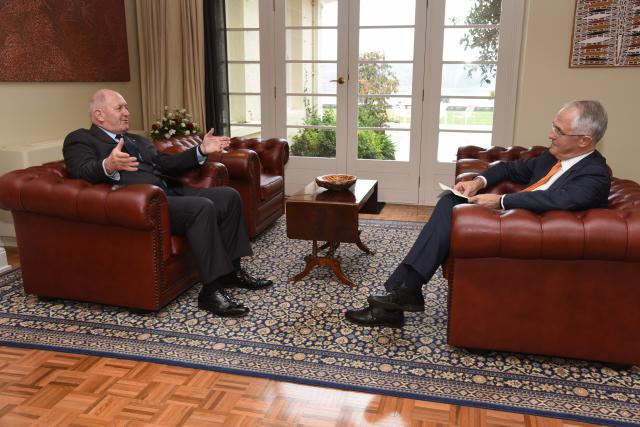
Prime Minister Malcolm Turnbull meeting with Governor-General Sir Peter Cosgrove on 8 May 2016 to request a double dissolution

The reserve powers are those powers that the governor-general may exercise independently, that is in the absence of or against ministerial advice. While most of these powers are listed in the Constitution, the circumstances in which they can be used with discretion is not prescribed and is a matter of convention.

The reserve powers that are generally accepted are:

- the discretion to select a prime minister if an election results in a parliament in which no party or coalition has a clear majority
- the power to dismiss a prime minister that has lost the support of the House of Representatives
- the power to refuse to dissolve the House of Representatives

The reserve powers that are the subject of greater debate are:

- the power to refuse a double dissolution
- the power to refuse a prorogation (Note: For instance, during the 2017–18 Australian parliamentary eligibility crisis, Governor-General Sir Peter Cosgrove indicated to Prime Minister Malcolm Turnbull that he would have refused to prorogue the parliament had he been asked while the resolution of by-elections was to be determined.)
- the discretion to select a prime minister following the dismissal of a prime minister that has lost the support of the House of Representatives
- the power to dismiss a prime minister who is unable to obtain supply and refuses to resign or advise a dissolution
- the power to dismiss a prime minister that has broken the law
- the power to refuse royal assent

The most prominent use of the reserve powers occurred in the course of the 1975 Australian constitutional crisis, in which governor-general Sir John Kerr dismissed the government of Gough Whitlam and appointed opposition leader Malcolm Fraser as prime minister while an election was held. Kerr acted following the blocking of supply by the opposition controlled Senate, arguing that this gave him both the right and duty to dismiss the government when they did not resign or advise an election. The event remains one of the most highly debated and controversial in Australian political history.

=== Deputies of the governor-general ===
Section 126 of the Constitution provides for the sovereign to authorise the governor-general to appoint a deputy or deputies to assist in the execution of their duties. Given the vast size of the country, and the primitive transport arrangements when the constitution was drafted in the late 19th century, it was convenient for the governor-general be able to delegate some of their duties to deputies. The current authorisation is contained in Part IV of the 2008 letters patent relating to the Office of governor-general, issued by Elizabeth II.

The vice-president of the Executive Council is, as a matter of course, appointed a deputy to the governor-general for the purposes of summoning meetings of the Executive Council, presiding at meetings of the Executive Council in the absence of the governor-general, and appointing a minister as deputy to the governor-general for the purpose of presiding at a meeting of the Executive Council in the absence of both the governor-general and the vice-president.

The chief justice of the High Court of Australia, or another justice of the High Court, is appointed as deputy of the governor-general to open sessions of the Australian Parliament and administer oaths or affirmations of allegiance to new members of Parliament after opening parliament. Where there are also new senators, a second High Court justice will be appointed deputy to the governor-general to administer oaths or affirmations of allegiance in the upper house.

Governors-general regularly appoint state governors (most often the governors of New South Wales and Victoria, due to their proximity to Canberra) as deputies of the governor-general so that they may carry out some of the administrative functions of the office when the governor-general is unavailable but in the country. This is in addition to the dormant commissions the governors hold to administer the Government of the Commonwealth when there is no governor-general, or the governor-general is incapacitated or absent from the Commonwealth.

Under Section 42 of the Constitution, the governor-general may authorise a person to administer the oath or affirmation of allegiance to newly-elected senators and members of Parliament. In practice, these people are the president of the Senate and speaker of the House.

== Ceremonial role ==
In addition to the formal constitutional role, the governor-general has a representative and ceremonial role, though the extent and nature of that role has depended on the expectations of the time, the individual in office at the time, the wishes of the incumbent government, and the individual's reputation in the wider community. Governors-general generally become patrons of various charitable institutions, present honours and awards, host functions for various groups of people including ambassadors to and from other countries, and travel widely throughout Australia. Sir William Deane (governor-general 1996–2001) described one of his functions as being "Chief Mourner" at prominent funerals. In Commentaries on the Constitution of the Commonwealth of Australia, Robert Garran wrote that, since the Australian executive is national in nature (being dependent on the nationally elected House of Representatives, rather than the Senate), "the Governor-General, as the official head of the Executive, does not in the smallest degree represent any federal element; if he represents anything he is the image and embodiment of national unity and the outward and visible representation of the Imperial relationship of the Commonwealth".

That role can become controversial, however, if the governor-general becomes unpopular with sections of the community. The public role adopted by Sir John Kerr was curtailed considerably after the constitutional crisis of 1975; Sir William Deane's focus on social justice issues provoked both praise and criticism; and Peter Hollingworth resigned after an independent inquiry determined that when he was the Anglican archbishop of Brisbane, he had knowingly allowed a paedophile priest to continue working.

=== Diplomatic role ===
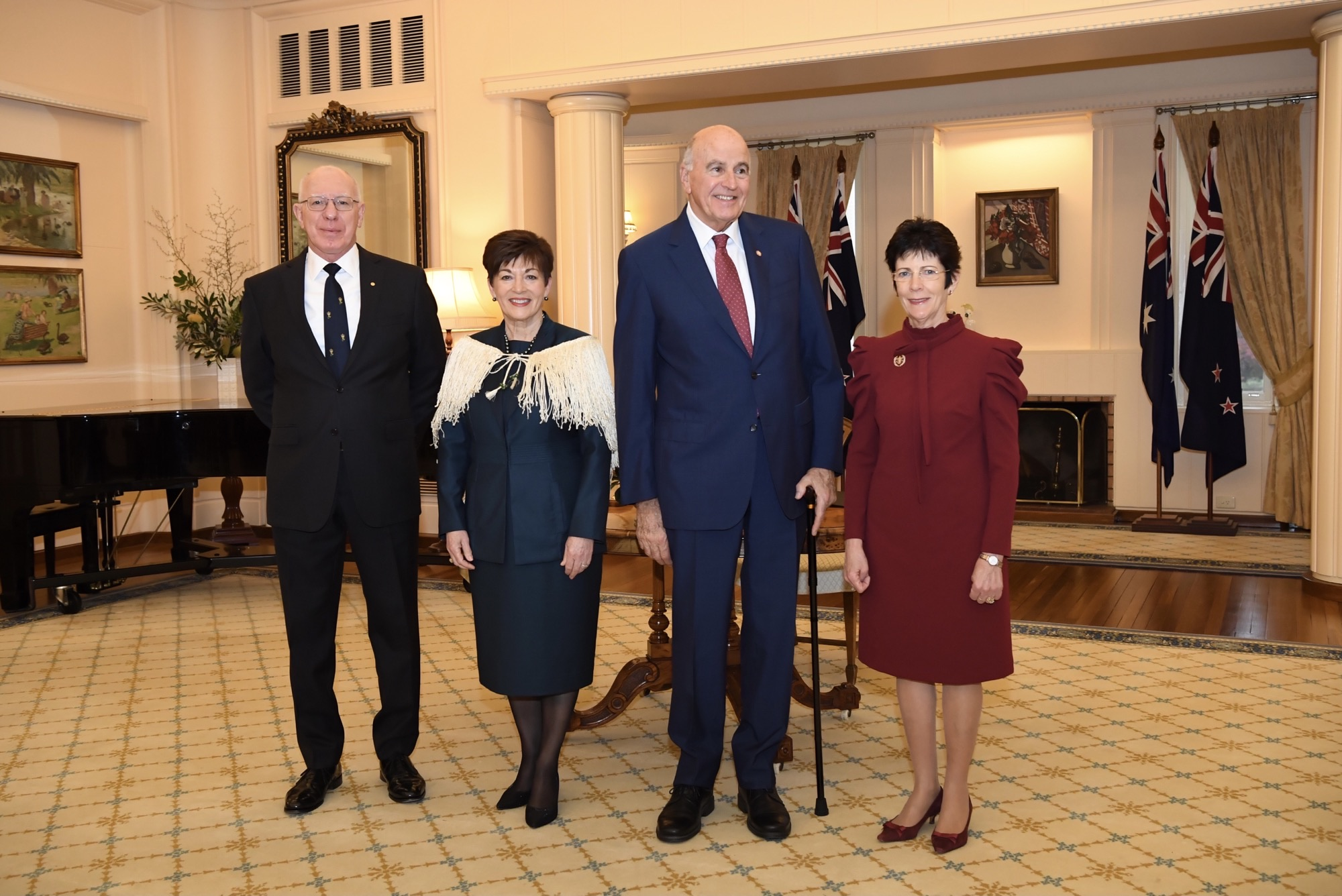
Governor-General David Hurley (left) with New Zealand governor-general Dame Patsy Reddy, her husband Sir David Gascoigne, and Mrs Linda Hurley in 2021

The governor-general makes state visits overseas on behalf of Australia, during which an administrator of the government is appointed. The right of governors-general to make state visits was confirmed at the 1926 Imperial Conference, as it was deemed not feasible for the sovereign to pay state visits on behalf of countries other than the United Kingdom. However, an Australian governor-general did not exercise that right until 1971, when Paul Hasluck visited New Zealand. Hasluck's successor John Kerr made state visits to eight countries, but Kerr's successor Zelman Cowen made only a single state visit – to Papua New Guinea – as he wished to concentrate on travelling within Australia. All subsequent governors-general have travelled widely while in office and made multiple state visits. Occasionally governors-general have made extended tours visiting multiple countries, notably in 2009 when Quentin Bryce visited nine African countries in 19 days.

The governor-general accredits (i.e. formally validates) Australia's ambassadors through sending a formal letter of credence (and a letter of recall at the end of a tenure) to foreign heads of state and government. Similarly, the governor-general formally receives letters from foreign countries during credentials ceremonies for heads of missions upon their arrival in Canberra. Before 1987, Australia's ambassador and high commissioner appointments were formally made by the monarch instead.

=== Military role ===
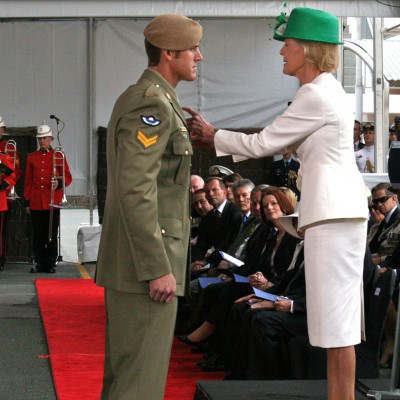
Governor-general Quentin Bryce awarding the Victoria Cross to Corporal Ben Roberts-Smith, 2011

Governor-General's rank insignia

Under section 68 of the Constitution, the command-in-chief of Australia's military forces is "vested in the Governor‑General as the Queen's representative". Views on the effect of this section vary, from merely making the governor-general "in effect no more than a glorified Patron of the Defence Forces" to alternatively making the governor-general the ultimate head of military chain of command who may influence or deny the use of the military if it is to be used for domestic political ends. Ex-governor-general Sir Ninian Stephen stated that his view of the section was that it vests command of the military in the governor-general personally, but only to the extent that the power to give orders or call out the military does not require formal advice from the Federal Executive Council but instead the direct advice of the relevant minister. Other powers exist in the Defence Force Act 1903, such as the power to appoint the chief of the Defence Force, to call out the Defence Force, and declare a time of war, exercised as ordinary executive powers on advice. Additionally, all officers are appointed by the governor-general on behalf of the monarch with a personally signed commission.

Historically, the power to declare war and make peace rested with the monarch (as advised by the British government) in their role as head of the British Empire. This was the position of Robert Menzies in 1939, who assumed that the declaration of war by the United Kingdom in World War II automatically applied to Australia. However, in 1941 opinion had shifted and the Curtin government advised the governor-general to declare war on several Axis powers. However, it was still unclear whether the governor-general had the constitutional power to declare war, so in addition to requesting the assignment of powers by the monarch to the governor-general, the government also requested King George VI make similar proclamations of war on Australia's behalf. No formal declarations of war have been made since World War II, although other declarations on the start and end of time of "active service" have been made in other conflicts.

The powers of command-in-chief are vested in the governor-general rather than the "Governor-General in Council", but this does not denote an element of personal discretion in their exercise. However, in 1970 governor-general Paul Hasluck refused prime minister John Gorton's request to authorise a Pacific Islands Regiment peacekeeping mission in the Territory of Papua and New Guinea, on the ground that cabinet had not been consulted. Gorton agreed to put the matter to his ministers, and a cabinet meeting agreed that troops should be called out only if requested by the territory's administrator; this did not occur. Defence minister Malcolm Fraser, who opposed the call out, was responsible for informing Hasluck of the prime minister's lack of consultation. The incident contributed to Fraser's resignation from cabinet in 1971 and Gorton's subsequent loss of the prime ministership.

== Community role ==
The governor-general is generally invited to become patron of various charitable and service organisations. Historically the governor-general has also served as Chief Scout of Australia. The chief scout is nominated by the Scouting Association's National Executive Committee and is invited by the president of the Scout Association to accept the appointment. Bill Hayden declined the office on the grounds of his atheism, which was incompatible with the Scout Promise. He did however serve as the association's patron during his term of office.

== Relationship with the monarch ==
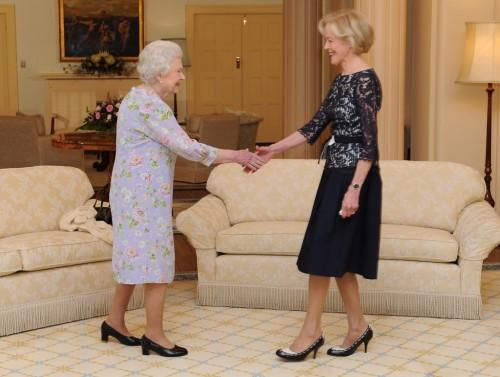
Governor-General Quentin Bryce with Queen Elizabeth II, 2011

While the governor-general is the monarch's representative, as provided by section 2 of the Constitution, the powers they exercise are solely granted by the Constitution. This was not always seen to be the case however, with section 2 also providing that the governor-general may exercise other powers, subject to the Constitution, that the monarch may assign them. Additionally, the initial letters patent of Queen Victoria purported to create and empower the office of governor-general, despite their assignment already in the Constitution. This was raised as early as 1901, by John Quick and Garran in their authoritative commentary of the Constitution, noting that the governor-general of Australia was distinguished from other imperial governors-general by the fact that "[t]he principal and most important of his powers and functions, legislative as well as executive, are expressly conferred on him by the terms of the Constitution itself ... not by Royal authority, but by statutory authority". This view was also held by Andrew Inglis Clark, senior judge of the Supreme Court of Tasmania, who with W. Harrison Moore (a contributor to the first draft of the constitution put before the 1897 Adelaide Convention and professor of law at the University of Melbourne), postulating that the letters patent and the royal instructions issued by Queen Victoria were unnecessary "or even of doubtful legality".

Additionally, it was also previously believed that the monarch retained certain powers, such as the power to declare war, appoint diplomatic officers and to grant charters of incorporation and as such these powers were assigned separately to the governor-general under section 2. However, the current interpretation of the Constitution is that all royal prerogatives are exercisable by the governor-general under section 61 and in recognition of this, the vesting of additional powers ended in 1987. While separate letters-patent still exist for the governor-general, these merely provide for the appointment of administrator in the case of the governor-general's absence or incapacity and requires the governor-general to make an oath or affirmation of allegiance and one of office.

Commonwealth Solicitor-General Maurice Byers stated in 1974: "The constitutional prescription is that executive power is exercisable by the governor-general although vested in the Queen. What is exercisable is original executive power: that is, the very thing vested in the Queen by section 61. And it is exercisable by the Queen's representative, not her delegate or agent."

The 1988 Constitutional Commission report explained: "the governor-general is in no sense a delegate of the Queen. The independence of the office is highlighted by changes which have been made in recent years to the Royal Instruments relating to it". The changes occurred in 1984 when Queen Victoria's letters patent and instructions were revoked and replaced with new letters patent, on prime minister Bob Hawke's advice, who stated that this would clarify the governor-general's position under the constitution.

This remains the case even when the sovereign is in the country: solicitor-general Kenneth Bailey, prior to the first tour of Australia by its reigning monarch in 1954, explained the position by saying:

the Constitution expressly vests in the Governor-General the power or duty to perform a number of the Crown's functions in the Legislature and the Executive Government of the Commonwealth ... The executive power of the Commonwealth, by section 61 of the Constitution, is declared to be vested in the Queen. It is also, in the same section, declared to be "exercisable" by the Governor-General as the Queen's representative. In the face of this provision, I feel it is difficult to contend that the Queen, even though present in Australia, may exercise in person functions of executive government which are specifically assigned by the constitution to the Governor-General.

The monarch did not overturn the actions of governor-general Sir John Kerr in his dismissal of the prime ministership and government of Gough Whitlam during the 1975 Australian constitutional crisis, with the Queen's private secretary arguing that the power to commission the prime minister was "clearly placed within the jurisdiction of the governor-general, and The Queen has no part in the decisions which the Governor-General must take in accordance with the Constitution". In an address to the Sydney Institute, January 2007, in connection with that event, Sir David Smith, a retired official secretary to the governor-general of Australia who had been Kerr's official secretary in 1975, described the constitution as conferring the powers and functions of Australia's head of state on the governor-general in "his own right". He stated that the governor-general was more than a representative of the sovereign, explaining: "under section 2 of the Constitution the Governor-General is the Queen's representative and exercises certain royal prerogative powers and functions; under section 61 of the Constitution the Governor-General is the holder of a quite separate and independent office created, not by the Crown, but by the Constitution, and empowered to exercise, in his own right as Governor-General ... all the powers and functions of Australia's head of state".

== Privileges ==
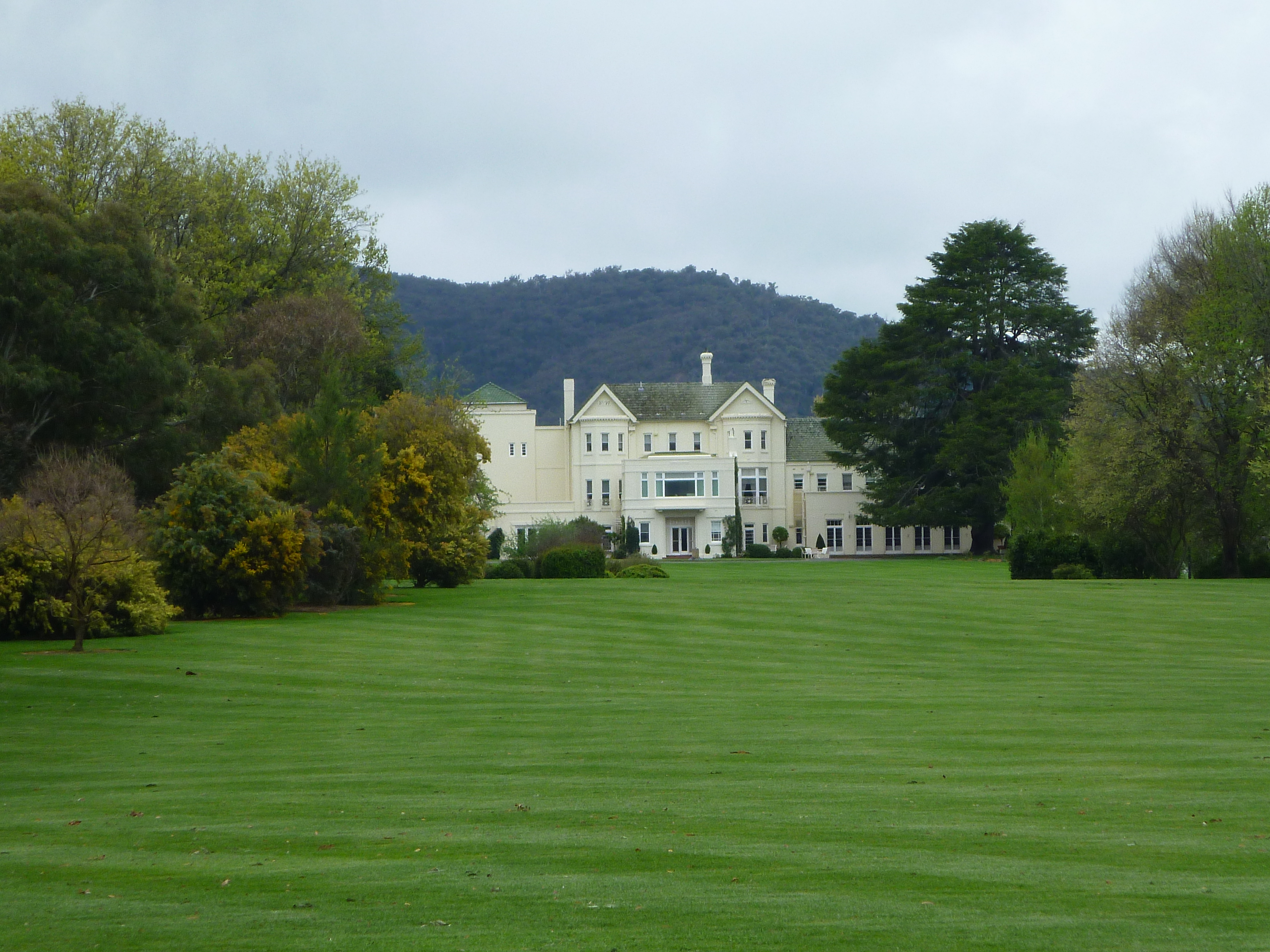
Government House, Canberra

Governors-general are entitled to various privileges by virtue of holding the office. These include the right to live in Government House (also known as Yarralumla) or Admiralty House, Sydney, the two official residences of the office-holder. For transportation, the governor-general has access to a Rolls-Royce Phantom VI limousine for ceremonial occasions or an armoured BMW 7 Series for ordinary official business. These cars fly the flag of the governor-general of Australia and display the Tudor Crown instead of number plates. Originally, two Phantoms were available after being purchased in the 1970s to be used for royal tours. One of these cars was sold in 1995 to a Sydney doctor, having previously carried the Queen during a royal tour and later being pelted with eggs when it carried Sir John Kerr following the Dismissal in 1975. The car was then entered into the almost 15,000 km long Peking to Paris rally, where it became known as "Lizzie's Taxi" and secured fourth place. The car is now owned by Lindsay Fox and is often on display as a part of the Fox Classic Car Collection at Queens Warehouse, Melbourne.

=== Salary ===
The salary of the governor-general was initially set by the Constitution at £10,000. (Note: That is, pounds sterling; an Australian pound (with the same value) was introduced only in 1910.) This could be changed by subsequent legislation, although the salary of the current governor-general cannot be changed during their term of office. Their pay (currently A$709,107) is now set by the Governor-General Act 1974, which is amended to set the salary for each new governor-general to an amount slightly higher than the estimated average salary of the chief justice of the High Court over the next five years. Since 1995, this has been reduced by the amount of any pension the incoming governor-general may be receiving from an earlier Commonwealth office. The governor-general also receives a pension amounting to 60% of the salary of the chief justice when they leave office. Until 2001, governors-general did not pay income tax on their salary; this was changed after Elizabeth II agreed to pay tax.

=== Official dress ===
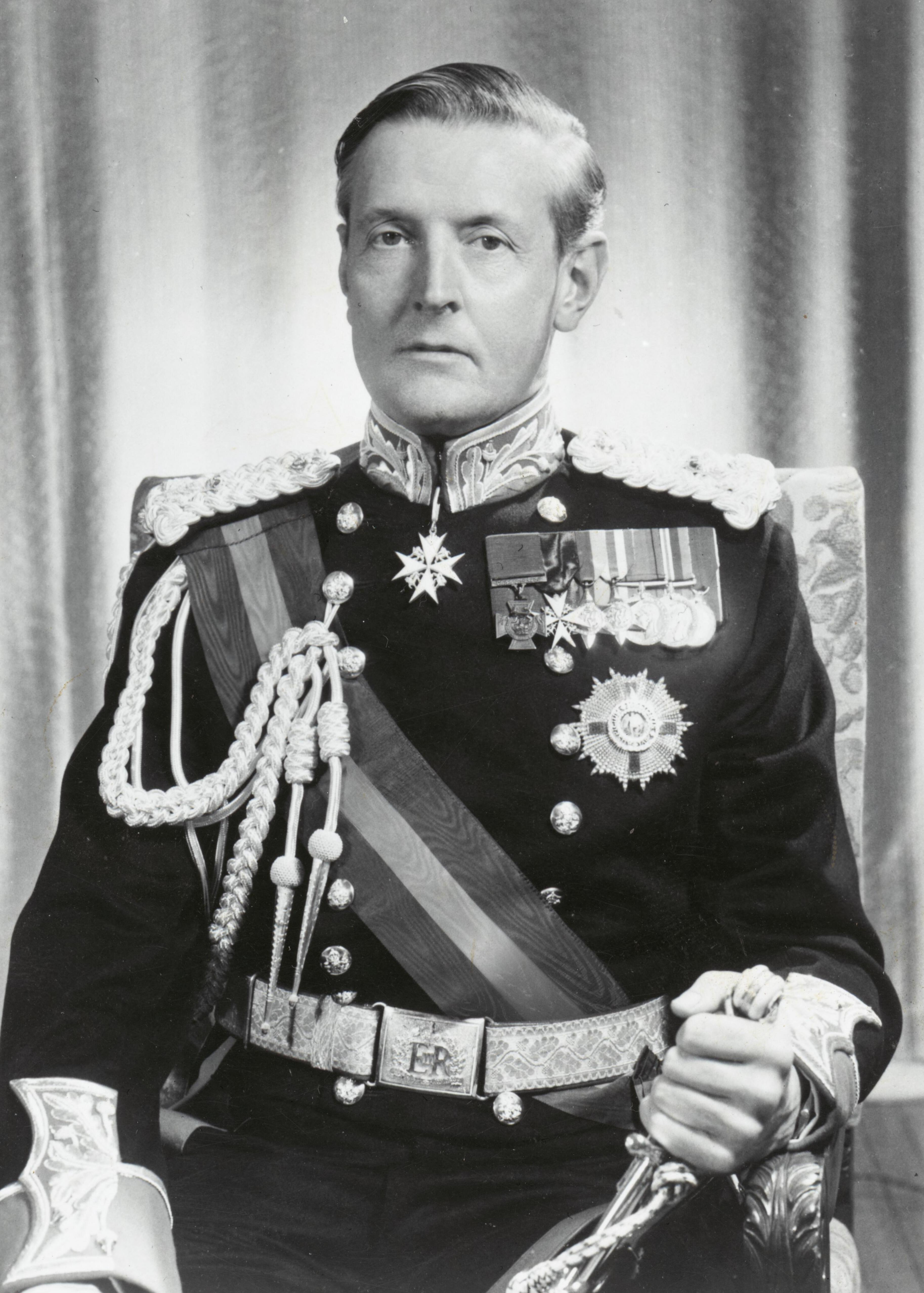
William Sidney, 1st Viscount De L'Isle, 15th governor-general of Australia (1961–65), in his court uniform

Governors-general before the 1970s wore traditional court uniforms, consisting of a dark navy wool double-breasted coatee with silver oak leaf and fern embroidery on the collar and cuffs trimmed with silver buttons embossed with the Royal Arms and with bullion edged epaulettes on the shoulders, dark navy trousers with a wide band of silver oak-leaf braid down the outside seam, silver sword belt with ceremonial sword, bicorne cocked hat with plume of ostrich feathers, black patent leather Wellington boots with spurs, etc., that is worn on ceremonial occasions. There is also a tropical version made of white tropical wool cut in a typical military fashion worn with a plumed helmet. However, that custom fell into disuse during the tenure of Sir Paul Hasluck with governors-general now observing informal wear day-to-day.

=== Titles and honours ===
Governors-general have during their tenure the style His or Her Excellency the Honourable and their spouses have the style His or Her Excellency. Since May 2013, the style used by a former governor-general is the Honourable; it was at the same time retrospectively granted for life to all previous holders of the office.

From the creation of the Order of Australia in 1975, the governor-general was, ex officio, Chancellor and Principal Companion of the order, and therefore became entitled to the post-nominal AC. In 1976, the letters patent for the order were amended to introduce the rank of Knight and Dame to the order, and from that time the governor-general became, ex officio, the Chancellor and Principal Knight of the order. In 1986 the letters patent were amended again, and governors-general appointed from that time were again, ex officio, entitled to the post-nominal AC (although if they already held a knighthood in the order that superior rank was retained).

Until 1989, all governors-general were members of the Privy Council of the United Kingdom and thus held the additional style The Right Honourable for life. The same individuals were also usually either peers, knights, or both (the only Australian peer to be appointed as governor-general was Lord Casey; and Sir William McKell was knighted only in 1951, some years into his term, but he was entitled to the style The Honourable during his tenure as premier of New South Wales, an office he held until almost immediately before his appointment). In 1989, Bill Hayden, a republican, declined appointment to the British Privy Council and any imperial honours. From that time until 2014, governors-general did not receive automatic titles or honours, other than the post-nominal AC by virtue of being Chancellor and Principal Companion of the Order of Australia. Quentin Bryce was the first governor-general to have had no prior title or pre-nominal style. She was in office when, on 19 March 2014, then prime minister Tony Abbott advised the Queen to amend the letters patent of the Order of Australia to reinstate knighthoods into the Order, with the governor-general becoming the Principal Knight or Dame of the order. However, in 2015 knighthoods were once again abolished by new prime minister Malcolm Turnbull, with all subsequent governors-general appointed as Companions.

Spouses of governors-general have no official duties but carry out the role of a vice-regal consort. They are entitled to the courtesy style Her Excellency or His Excellency during the office-holder's term of office. Most spouses of governors-general have been content to be quietly supportive. Some, however, have been notable in their own right, such as Dame Alexandra Hasluck, Lady Casey and Michael Bryce.

== History ==
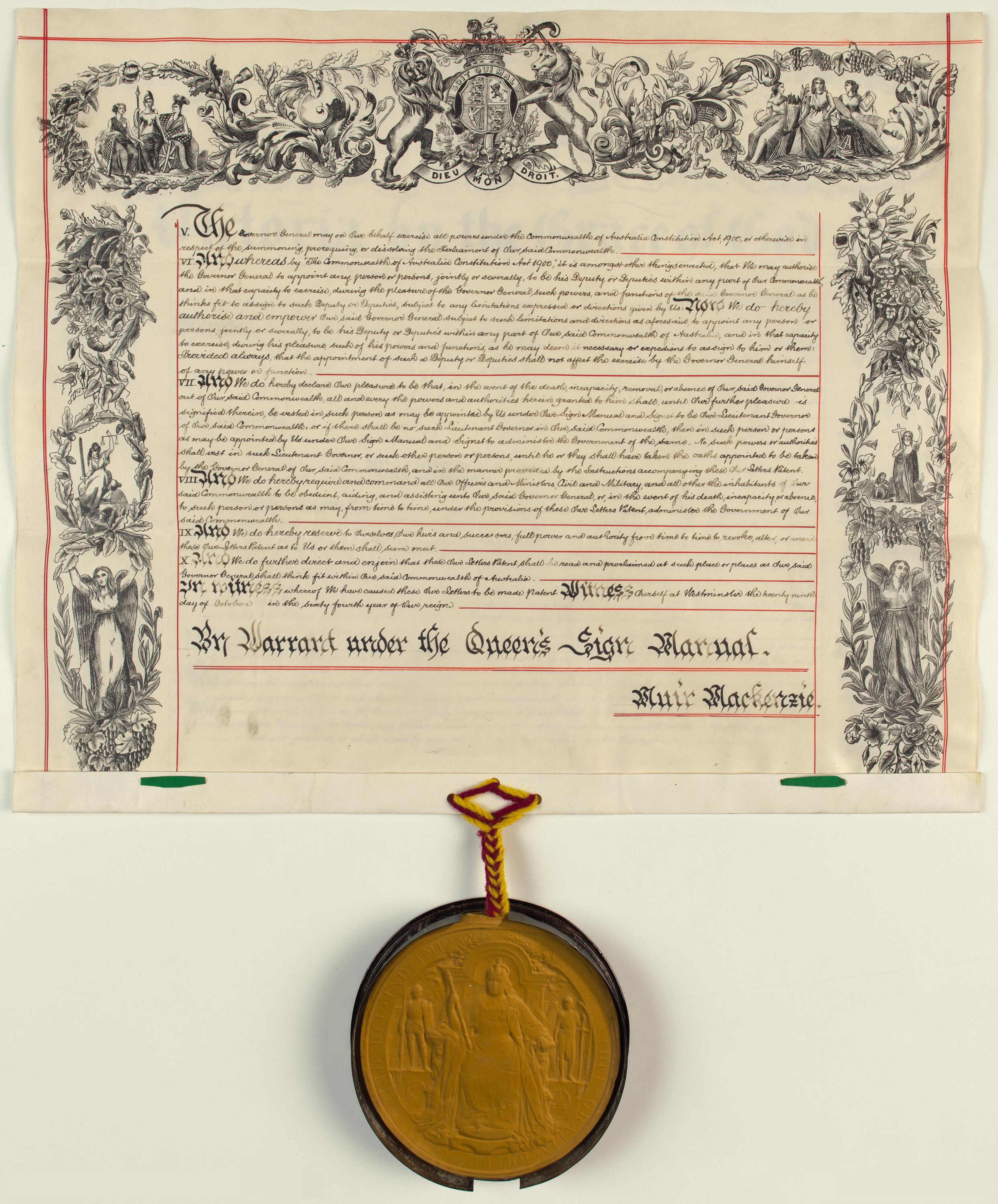
The letters patent issued by Queen Victoria in 1900 regulating the office of governor-general

Other offices named governor-general were previously used in Australia in the mid-19th century. Sir Charles FitzRoy (governor of New South Wales from 1846 to 1855) and Sir William Denison (governor of New South Wales from 1855 to 1861) also carried the additional title of governor-general because their jurisdiction extended to other colonies in Australia.

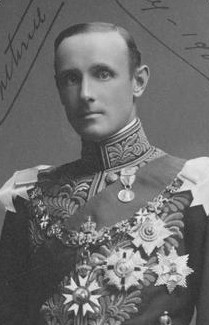
John Hope, 7th Earl of Hopetoun, the first governor-general, 1900–1903

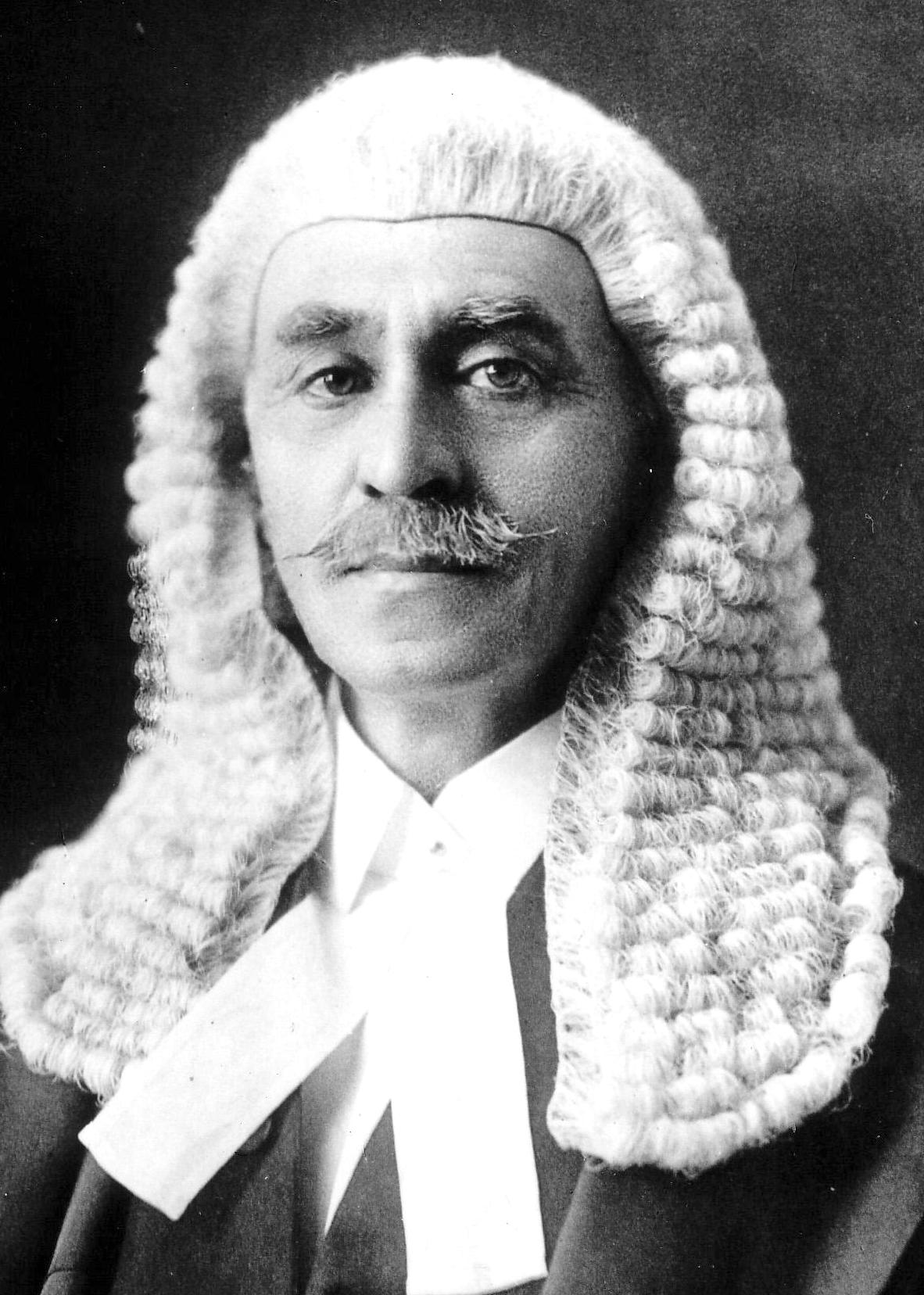
Sir Isaac Isaacs, the first Australian-born governor-general, 1931–1936

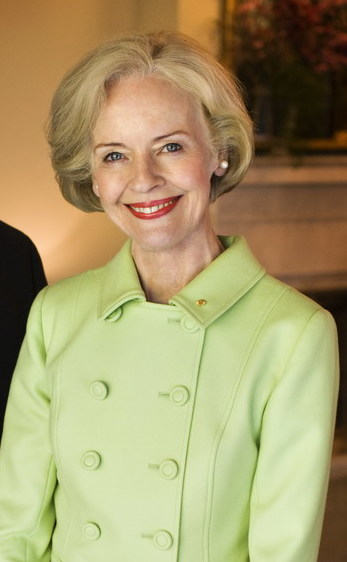
Dame Quentin Bryce, the first female governor-general, 2008–2014

The office of governor-general of Australia was conceived during the debates and conventions leading up to federation. The first governor-general, John Hope, 7th Earl of Hopetoun, was a previous governor of Victoria. He was selected on 14 July 1900 and legally appointed on 29 October 1900, returning to Australia shortly before the inauguration of the Commonwealth of Australia on 1 January 1901. After the initial confusion of the Hopetoun Blunder, he appointed the first prime minister of Australia, Edmund Barton, to a caretaker government, with the inaugural 1901 federal election not occurring until March.

Early governors-general were British and were appointed by the king on the recommendation of the Colonial Office. The Australian government was merely asked, as a matter of courtesy, whether they approved of the choice or not. Governors-general were expected to exercise a supervisory role over the Australian government in the manner of a colonial governor. In a very real sense, they represented the British government. They had the right to reserve legislation passed by the Parliament of Australia: in effect, to ask the Colonial Office in London for an opinion before giving the royal assent. They exercised this power several times. The monarch, acting upon advice of the British government, could also disallow any Australian legislation up to a year after the governor-general had given it the assent; although this power has never been used. These powers remain in section 59 of the Constitution of Australia, but today are regarded as dead letters.

The early governors-general frequently sought advice on the exercise of their powers from judges of the High Court of Australia, Sir Samuel Griffith and Sir Edmund Barton.

In 1919, prime minister Billy Hughes sent a memorandum to the Colonial Office in which he requested "a real and effective voice in the selection of the King's representative". He further proposed that the Dominions be able to nominate their own candidates and that "the field of selection should not exclude citizens of the Dominion itself". The memorandum met with strong opposition within the Colonial Office and was dismissed by Lord Milner, the Colonial Secretary; no response was given. The following year, as Ronald Munro Ferguson's term was about to expire, Hughes cabled the Colonial Office and asked that the appointment be made in accordance with the memorandum. To mollify Hughes, Milner offered him a choice between three candidates. After consulting his cabinet he chose Henry Forster, 1st Baron Forster. In 1925, under prime minister Stanley Bruce, the same practice was followed for the appointment of Forster's successor John Baird, 1st Viscount Stonehaven, with the Australian government publicly stating that his name "had been submitted, with others, to the Commonwealth ministry, who had selected him".

During the 1920s, the importance of the position declined. As a result of decisions made at the 1926 Imperial Conference, the governor-general ceased to represent the British government diplomatically, and the British right of supervision over Australian affairs was abolished. As a result of the Balfour Declaration of 1926, which declared that the UK and the Dominions to be "autonomous Communities within the British Empire, equal in status, in no way subordinate one to another", the declaration further stated:

the Governor-General of a Dominion is the representative of the Crown, holding in all essential respects the same position in relation to the administration of public affairs in the Dominion as is held by His Majesty the King in Great Britain, and that he is not the representative or agent of His Majesty's Government in Great Britain or of any Department of that Government.

However, it remained unclear just whose prerogative it now became to decide who new governors-general would be. In 1930, King George V and the Australian prime minister James Scullin discussed the appointment of a new governor-general to replace Lord Stonehaven, whose term was coming to an end. The King maintained that it was now his sole prerogative to choose a governor-general, and he wanted Field-Marshal Sir William Birdwood for the Australian post. Scullin recommended the Australian jurist Sir Isaac Isaacs, and he insisted that George V act on the advice of his Australian prime minister in this matter. Scullin was partially influenced by the precedent set by the government of the Irish Free State, which always insisted upon having an Irishman as the governor-general of the Irish Free State.

Scullin's proposed appointment of Sir Isaac Isaacs was fiercely opposed by the British government. This was not because of any lack of regard for Isaacs personally, but because the British government considered that the choice of governors-general was, since the 1926 Imperial Conference, a matter for the monarch's decision alone. (However, it became very clear in a conversation between Scullin and King George V's private secretary, Lord Stamfordham, on 11 November 1930, that this was merely the official reason for the objection, with the real reason being that an Australian, no matter how highly regarded personally, was not considered appropriate to be a governor-general.) Scullin was equally insistent that the monarch must act on the relevant prime minister's direct advice (the practice until 1926 was that Dominion prime ministers advised the monarch indirectly, through the British government, which effectively had a veto over any proposal it did not agree with). Scullin cited the precedents of the Prime Minister of South Africa, J. B. M. Hertzog, who had recently insisted on his choice of George Villiers, 6th Earl of Clarendon as governor-general of that country, and the selection of an Irishman as governor-general of the Irish Free State. Both of these appointments had been agreed to despite British government objections.

Despite these precedents, George V remained reluctant to accept Scullin's recommendation of Isaacs and asked him to consider Birdwood. However, Scullin stood firm, saying he would be prepared to fight a general election on the issue of whether an Australian should be prevented from becoming governor-general because he was Australian. On 29 November, the King agreed to Isaacs's appointment, but made it clear that he did so only because he felt he had no option. Lord Stamfordham had complained that Scullin had "put a gun to the King's head".

The usual wording of official announcements of this nature read "The King has been pleased to appoint ...", but on this occasion the announcement said merely "The King has appointed ...", and Lord Stamfordham asked the Australian solicitor-general, Sir Robert Garran, to make sure that Scullin was aware of the exact wording. The opposition Nationalist Party of Australia denounced the appointment as "practically republican", but Scullin had set a precedent. The convention gradually became established throughout the British Commonwealth that the governor-general is a citizen of the country concerned, and is appointed on the advice of the government of that country.

At the same time as the appointment of Isaacs as the first Australian-born governor-general, a separate role of British Representative in Australia (as the representative of the British government) was established, with Ernest Crutchley the first appointee. 1935 saw the appointment of the first British High Commissioner to Australia, Geoffrey Whiskard (in office 1936–1941).

This right not only to advise the monarch directly, but also to expect that advice to be accepted, was soon taken up by all the other Dominion prime ministers. This, among other things, led to the Statute of Westminster 1931 and to the formal separation of the Crowns of the Dominions.

After Scullin's defeat in 1931, non-Labor governments continued to recommend British people for appointment as governor-general, but such appointments remained solely a matter between the Australian government and the monarch. In 1947, Labor appointed a second Australian governor-general, William McKell, who was in office as the Labor premier of New South Wales. The then leader of the Opposition, Robert Menzies, called McKell's appointment "shocking and humiliating".

In 1965 the Menzies conservative government appointed an Australian, Lord Casey, and thereafter only Australians have held the position. However, when the Palace papers were released in 2020, it was revealed that the Fraser government in 1976 considered it "highly desirable" that Prince Charles become governor-general; however the Queen strongly indicated her disapproval of her son taking up the role until "such time as he has a settled married life". Additionally, in 2007 media outlets reported that Prince William might become governor-general of Australia. However, both the prime minister, John Howard, and Clarence House repudiated the suggestion.

=== Backgrounds of governors-general ===
All the governors-general until 1965 were British-born, except for Australian-born Sir Isaac Isaacs (1931–1936) and Sir William McKell (1947–1953). They included six barons, two viscounts, two earls, and one prince. There have been only Australian occupants since then, although Sir Ninian Stephen (1982–1989) had been born in Britain. Prince Henry, Duke of Gloucester, was a senior member of the royal family. Dame Quentin Bryce (2008–2014) was the first woman to be appointed to the office. Sir Isaac Isaacs and Sir Zelman Cowen were Jewish; Bill Hayden was an avowed atheist during his term and he made an affirmation rather than swear an oath at the beginning of his commission; the remaining governors-general have been Christian.

Various governors-general had previously served as governors of an Australian state or colony: John Hope, 7th Earl of Hopetoun (Victoria 1889–1895); Hallam Tennyson, 2nd Baron Tennyson (South Australia 1899–1902); Alexander Hore-Ruthven, 1st Earl of Gowrie (South Australia 1928–34; and New South Wales 1935–1936); Major General Michael Jeffery (Western Australia 1993–2000); Dame Quentin Bryce (Queensland 2003–2008); General David Hurley (New South Wales 2014–2019). Sir Ronald Munro Ferguson had been offered the governorship of South Australia in 1895 and of Victoria in 1910, but refused both appointments. Henry Northcote, 1st Baron Northcote was governor of Bombay. Lord Casey was governor of Bengal in between his periods of service to the Commonwealth Parliament.

Former leading politicians and members of the judiciary have figured prominently. William Ward, 2nd Earl of Dudley was Lord Lieutenant of Ireland (1902–1905). John Baird, 1st Viscount Stonehaven (as John Baird) was minister for Transport in the cabinets of Bonar Law and Stanley Baldwin; and after his return to Britain he became chairman of the UK Conservative Party. Sir Isaac Isaacs was successively Commonwealth attorney-general, a High Court judge, and chief justice. Sir William McKell was premier of New South Wales. William Morrison, 1st Viscount Dunrossil (as William Morrison) was Speaker of the UK House of Commons. William Sidney, 1st Viscount De L'Isle was secretary of State for Air in Winston Churchill's cabinet from 1951 to 1955. More recent governors-general in this category include Lord Casey, Sir Paul Hasluck, Sir John Kerr, Sir Ninian Stephen, Bill Hayden and Sir William Deane.

Of the eleven Australians appointed governor-general since 1965, Lord Casey, Sir Paul Hasluck and Bill Hayden were former federal parliamentarians; Sir John Kerr was the Chief Justice of the Supreme Court of New South Wales; Sir Ninian Stephen and Sir William Deane were appointed from the bench of the High Court; Sir Zelman Cowen was a vice-chancellor of the University of Queensland and constitutional lawyer; Peter Hollingworth was the Anglican Archbishop of Brisbane; and Major General Michael Jeffery was a retired military officer and former governor of Western Australia. Quentin Bryce's appointment was announced during her term as governor of Queensland; she had previously been the Federal Sex Discrimination Commissioner. General David Hurley was a retired chief of Defence Force and former governor of New South Wales.

Significant post-retirement activities of earlier governors-general have included: Lord Tennyson was appointed deputy governor of the Isle of Wight; Sir Ronald Munro Ferguson (by now Lord Novar) became secretary of State for Scotland; and Lord Gowrie became chairman of the Marylebone Cricket Club (Henry Forster, 1st Baron Forster had also held this post, before his appointment as governor-general).

== See also ==
- History of Australia
- Constitutional history of Australia
- Chapter II of the Constitution of Australia
- Governors of the Australian states
- Viceregal consort of Australia
- Armorial of the governors-general of Australia
- British Empire
- Royal Australian Air Force VIP aircraft
- Governor-general (links to other countries which have governors-general)
- Australian VIP transport

The Earl's March by Walter J. Turner

- Musical composition "The Earl's March" written by Australian author Walter J. Turner in 1889 dedicated to Adrian Hope, while in office.
