= Ewen Fergusson =

Scotland international rugby union player & diplomat

Sir Ewen Fergusson GCMG GCVO
- Born: Ewen Alastair John Fergusson; 28 October 1932
- Died: 20 April 2017 (aged 84) Vaison-la-Romaine, France
- School: Rugby School
- University: Oriel College, Oxford

Rugby union career
- Position: Lock
Amateur team(s)
Years	Team	Apps	(Points)
- Oxford University
International career
Years	Team	Apps	(Points)
1954	Scotland	5	(0)

Sir Ewen Alastair John Fergusson GCMG GCVO (28 October 1932 – 20 April 2017) was a British diplomat and Scotland international rugby union player.

The son of Sir Ewen MacGregor Field Fergusson, formerly chairman and managing director of the Straits Trading Company, Singapore, and Winifred Evelyn Fergusson, he was educated at Rugby and Oriel College, Oxford.

== Rugby Union career ==
=== Amateur career ===
He played rugby for Oxford University.

=== International career ===
Fergusson was capped by Scotland in 1954. He gained 5 caps.

== Diplomatic career ==
He was a 2nd Lieutenant with the 60th Rifles. After 2 years with the King's Royal Rifle Corps, he entered Her Majesty's Diplomatic Service in 1956.

He was British Ambassador to South Africa 1982–84, deputy under secretary of state at the Foreign and Commonwealth Office 1984–87 and British Ambassador to France 1987–92.

=== Honours ===
He was an honorary fellow of Oriel College, Oxford and holds an honorary LLD from Aberdeen University. He was appointed KCMG in the 1987 Birthday Honours, GCVO in 1992, GCMG in the 1993 New Year Honours, and a Grand Officier of the Légion d'Honneur. He served as King of Arms of the Order of St Michael and St George from 1996 until 2007.

== Business career ==
He was Chairman of Coutts from 1993 to 1999, and of the Savoy Hotel Group 1994–98. He was chairman of the governors of Rugby School from 1995 to 2002 and a trustee of the National Gallery from 1995 to 2002.

== Family ==
Fergusson married Sara Carolyn Montgomery Cuninghame (née Gordon Lennox) and they were to have a son, also named Ewen, and daughters Iona and Anna. His son was also to attend Oriel College, Oxford.

== Sources ==
- Debrett's People of Today, 2007

Diplomatic posts
Preceded by Sir Stephen Barrett	Principal Private Secretary to the Foreign Secretary; 1975-1978	Succeeded by George Walden
Preceded by Sir John Leahy	British Ambassador to South Africa; 1982-1984	Succeeded by Sir Patrick Moberly
Preceded by Sir John Fretwell	British Ambassador to France; 1987-1992	Succeeded by Sir Christopher Mallaby
