= Thomas Sheepshanks =

English civil servant (1895–1964)

Sir Thomas Herbert Sheepshanks, KCB, KBE (10 January 1895 – 1 February 1964) was an English civil servant.

Sheepshanks was the youngest son of John Sheepshanks, bishop of Norwich; one of his sisters was the journalist and social worker Mary Sheepshanks. He was educated at Winchester College from 1908 to 1913, and Trinity College, Oxford, where he matriculated in 1913. He served in the First World War, and did not complete his degree.

Sheepshanks entered the Ministry of Health in 1919 and spent the rest of his career in the civil service. He was promoted to assistant secretary in the Ministry in 1936; the following year, he moved to the Home Office to support the preparation of an air road precaution programme which required his experience of working with local authorities and the grant system. He was closely involved in supporting Sir John Anderson's work preparing the Civil Defence Act 1939. In 1939, he moved to the Ministry of Home Security as a principal assistant secretary.

He was seconded to the Ministry of Reconstruction in 1943, where he drafted the government's white paper on social security which implemented Sir William Beveridge's report on the matter. After short spells in the Ministry of National Insurance (as deputy secretary, 1944) and the Treasury (as under-secretary from 1945 to 1946), he was permanent secretary of the Ministry of Town and Country Planning from 1946 to 1951, of the Ministry of Local Government and Planning in 1951, and of the Ministry of Housing and Local Government from 1951 to 1955. The Times noted his exceptional abilities as a negotiator, which was important in the relationships with local authorities that played a central part in the course of his career. He was also highly regarded as a drafter, and oversaw the enactment of the New Towns Act 1946 and the Town and Country Planning Act 1947. He was appointed a Companion of the Order of the Bath (CB) in the 1941 New Year Honours and promoted to Knight Commander (KCB) in the 1948 New Year Honours; he was also appointed a Knight Commander of the Order of the British Empire (KBE) in the 1944 Birthday Honours.

Government offices
Preceded by Sir Geoffrey Whiskard	Permanent Secretary, Ministry of Town and Country Planning; 1946–51	Succeeded by himself (as Permanent Secretary, Ministry of Planning and Local Government)
Preceded by himself (as Permanent Secretary, Ministry of Town and Country Planning)	Permanent Secretary, Ministry of Local Government and Planning; 1951	Succeeded by himself (as Permanent Secretary, Ministry of Housing and Local Government)
Preceded by himself (as Permanent Secretary, Ministry of Planning and Local Government)	Permanent Secretary, Ministry of Housing and Local Government; 1951–55	Succeeded by Dame Evelyn Sharp
