= Matthew Stevenson (civil servant) =

British civil servant

Sir Matthew Stevenson, KCB, CMG (21 April 1910 – 28 May 1981) was a Scottish civil servant.

Born on 21 April 1910, Stevenson was the son of James Stevenson (1872–1925), a blacksmith and professional footballer, and his wife Jessie Jane, née Strachan. Stevenson attended the University of Glasgow before he entered HM Civil Service in 1931 as a junior tax inspector. He was seconded to HM Treasury in 1946, a position which was made permanent. Promotions followed and in 1952–53 he was abroad on diplomatic work. He was appointed a Companion of the Order of St Michael and St George (CMG) in the 1953 Coronation Honours.

Stevenson was appointed a deputy secretary at the Ministry of Power in 1961 and was appointed a Companion of the Order of the Bath (CB) in the 1961 Birthday Honours. He was promoted to be the ministry's Permanent Secretary in 1965, serving until 1966, when he was appointed Permanent Secretary of the Ministry of Housing and Local Government, serving until retirement in 1970, much of the time under the minister Richard Crossman, in whose published diaries Stevenson features. Shortly after his final appointment, he was promoted to Knight Commander of the Order of the Bath (KCB) in the 1966 Birthday Honours.

In retirement, he completed an inquiry into the Crown Agents in 1972, which was published in 1977. He died on 28 May 1981.

Government offices
Preceded by Sir Dennis Proctor	Permanent Secretary, Ministry of Power; 1965–66	Succeeded by Sir David Pitblado
Preceded by Dame Evelyn Sharp	Permanent Secretary, Ministry of Housing and Local Government; 1966–70	Succeeded by Sir David Serpell (as Permanent Secretary, Department of the Environment
