= Evelyn Sharp, Baroness Sharp =

British civil servant (1903–1985)

The Right Honourable The Baroness Sharp GBE
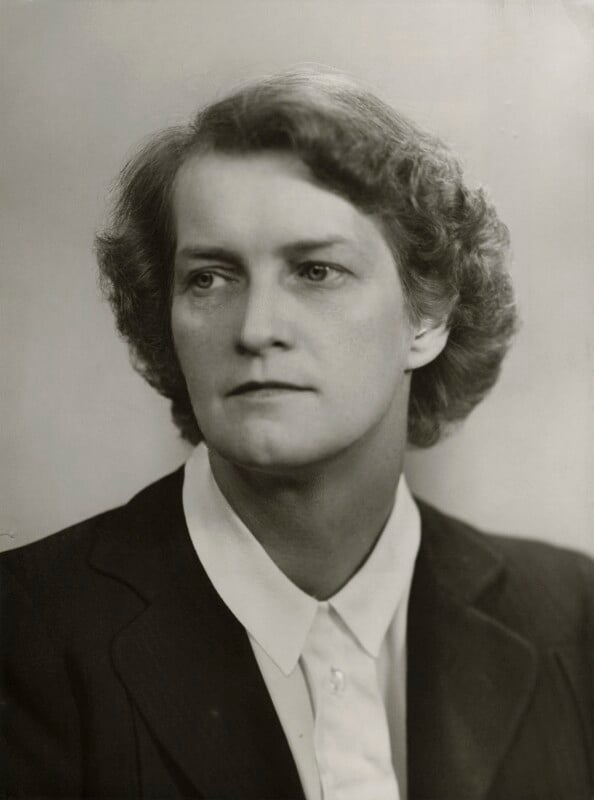
- Sharp in 1950
- Born: Evelyn Adelaide Sharp; 25 May 1903; Hornsey, Middlesex, England, UK
- Died: 1 September 1985 (aged 82); Lavenham, Suffolk, England, UK
- Occupations: Permanent Secretary in the Ministry of Housing and Local Government
- Relatives: Richard Harvey (uncle); Sir John Harvey (uncle); Sir Ernest Harvey (uncle)

Evelyn Adelaide Sharp, Baroness Sharp, GBE (25 May 1903 – 1 September 1985) was a British civil servant. She was the first woman to hold the position of Permanent Secretary, the most senior civil servant in a Ministry, at the Ministry of Housing and Local Government from 1955 to her retirement in 1966.

== Early life ==
Sharp was born in Hornsey, Middlesex (now part of Haringey in north London). She was the third of five children, with three sisters and a younger brother. Her parents were the Reverend Charles James Sharp, the Vicar of Ealing, and his wife, Mary Frances Musgrave Harvey. Her uncles included Richard Harvey, Archdeacon of Halifax; Sir John Harvey, Judge of the Supreme Court of New South Wales; and Sir Ernest Harvey, Bt, Chief Cashier of the Bank of England.

She was educated at Dana House in Crouch Hill, and the North London Collegiate School. At St Paul's Girls' School, she captained both cricket and netball teams. In 1922 she moved to Somerville College, Oxford, graduating with a second in Modern History in 1925.

== Civil and public service ==
In 1926, she joined the Civil Service as an administrator, at first in the Board of Trade then after 18 months the Ministry of Health. Although the Sex Disqualification (Removal) Act had been enacted in 1919, the examinations to enter the administrative grades at the civil service had only been opened to women in 1925. The first three in 1925 were Alix Kilroy (a college friend), Enid Russell-Smith and Mary Smieton; all three would later be named Dames Commander of the Order of the British Empire.

The Ministry of Health at the time was concerned with housing and local government, and this soon became her specialty. During the Second World War she was seconded to the Treasury. At the end of the war she returned to the Ministry of Health as an under-secretary in 1945, before becoming Deputy Secretary in the Ministry of Town and Country Planning in 1946. As no other woman had been as senior, there were no established women's pay scales, so she received the same pay as men on the same grade, a decade before equal pay became official policy. She played an important role in the development of post-war planning policy, including the Town and Country Planning Act 1947 and championed the development of new towns. She argued that for new towns to work they must not act against economic and social forces or be cross-subsidised, embracing the notion that they should be competitive. Sharp was committed to local government and strengthening its influence through reforms, and was dedicated to visiting local authorities over the country. Her obituary in The Times described her as doing "more than anyone else in this century to bring local and central government closely together. In local government circles she earnt a personal trust that was unique."

When the Ministry of Housing and Local Government was formed in 1951, she became the Deputy Secretary. She worked with Harold Macmillan, who later described her as "without exception the ablest woman I have ever known". In October 1955, she was promoted to be the Permanent Secretary. By this she became the first woman to be in the highest executive position with a Ministry, and she worked for five different Ministers during her time: Duncan Sandys, Henry Brooke, Charles Hill, Keith Joseph and Richard Crossman. She held the post to her retirement in 1966. She developed a reputation for her depth of specialist knowledge and experience, direct approach and strength of character (to the extent that she is often described as "formidable"), and an ability to identify solutions, a 'maker of civil servant history'.

From 1964, her Minister was Labour's Richard Crossman, who described his battles with her in the first of his three-volume Diaries of a Cabinet Minister. Sharp succeeded in keeping planning within her ministry's remit, after the government formed a new Ministry of Land and Natural Resources.

She was a member of the Plowden committee, which examined the control of public expenditure, from 1959 to 1961. After her retirement, she served on the Royal Commission on local government in England from 1966 to 1969 (see Redcliffe-Maud Report), and she was a member of the Independent Broadcasting Authority from 1966 to 1973. She also served as a director of the construction company Bovis, and as president of the London and Quadrant Housing Trust.

She was the author of a 1970 report to the Minister of Transport called Transport Planning: The Men For The Job. The intention of this report was to make transport planning in local government more efficient; the report discussed how to organise transport planning and what university courses would be needed to supply sufficient engineers and technicians to perform the work. However, the report is remembered because it clearly stated that transport planning and land-use planning could not be separated and should be performed by a single department as an ongoing activity.

In 1983 she wrote to The Times to explain her opposition to Thatcher's abolition of the GLC.

== Another viewpoint ==
Because of her enthusiasm for modernist architecture and urban rebuilding it has been said that she "truly did come close to doing as much damage to Britain as the Luftwaffe". "She went along with the conventional wisdom of the time in backing high-rise flats — something she later regretted".

== Honours and styles ==
=== Honours ===
In 1948, she was appointed to the Order of the British Empire as a Dame Commander (DBE). In 1961, she was promoted to be a Dame Grand Cross in the same order (GBE). On 19 September 1968 she was raised to the peerage as Baroness Sharp, of Hornsey in Greater London. She joined the Social Democratic Party (SDP) upon its formation in 1981 and took the SDP whip in the House of Lords.

She became an honorary fellow at Somerville College, Oxford in 1955. She received an honorary DCL from Oxford University in 1960, and later honorary LLDs from Cambridge University, Manchester University, and Sussex University.

In 1976 she became the first woman Honorary Fellow of the Institution of Structural Engineers.

=== Styles of address ===
- 1948–1968: Dame Evelyn Sharp
- 1968–1985: The Right Honourable The Baroness Sharp

== Death ==
Baroness Sharp died at Lavenham in Suffolk in 1985, aged 82. She never married, but a long-term relationship with another senior civil servant from the 1950s to the 1970s was an open secret.

Government offices
Preceded by Sir Thomas Sheepshanks	Permanent Secretary, Ministry of Housing and Local Government; 1955–66	Succeeded by Sir Matthew Stevenson
