= Lieutenant-governor (Australia) =

Standing Appointment

In Australia, a lieutenant-governor is a standing appointment for a deputy governor of a state, who acts in place of the governor if the governor is unable, unavailable or unwilling to act.

Constitutionally, Australian state lieutenant-governors, administrators and chief justices of state supreme courts are normally separate offices. However, in many states, such as New South Wales, the Chief Justice of the Supreme Court is also the lieutenant-governor. In 2001, the Constitution of Queensland was amended to restore the office of lieutenant-governor in that state. When a state governor dies, resigns, or is absent, an administrator or acting governor is appointed. The state lieutenant-governors/administrators have no standing powers but stand ready to take up the governor's role.

In some states, there is also a standing deputy governor, who can exercise only the powers which the governor delegates to him or her.

== New South Wales ==
In New South Wales, there is a lieutenant-governor and an administrator, who takes up the duties of the Governor if the governor dies, resigns, or is absent.

Since 1872 the office was permanently filled by the Chief Justice of New South Wales but the position may be retained by the chief justice after his/her retirement from the Supreme Court of New South Wales.

If the lieutenant-governor becomes incapacitated while serving in the office of governor, the next most senior judge of the Supreme Court is sworn in as administrator.

The lieutenant-governors/administrators have no standing powers but stand ready to act in the governor's position.

Andrew Bell, Chief Justice of the Supreme Court of New South Wales, is the current lieutenant governor.

== South Australia ==
In South Australia, the lieutenant governor is appointed by the Governor at the governor's pleasure. The lieutenant governor acts as the vice-regal representative in the governor's absence.

The lieutenant governor may act as administrator of the state at the request of the premier if the governor is on extended leave or the office is vacant. If the lieutenant governor is not available, the chief justice is next in line to be appointed.

Richard Harris, an anaesthetist and amateur cave diver is the current lieutenant governor. He is most notable for being involved in the Tham Luang cave rescue.

== Victoria ==
In Victoria, there is a lieutenant-governor and an administrator. The Chief Justice of Victoria is ex officio the administrator, unless the chief justice is the lieutenant-governor, in which case, the next most senior judge is the administrator. The lieutenant-governor takes on the responsibilities of the governor when that post is vacant or when the governor is out of the State or unable to act. The administrator takes on those duties if both the governor and lieutenant-governor are not able to act for the above reasons.

The lieutenant-governor is appointed by the governor on the advice of the Premier of Victoria. Appointment as lieutenant-governor of itself confers no powers or functions. If there is no governor or if the governor is unavailable to act for a substantial period, the lieutenant-governor assumes office as administrator and exercises all the powers and functions of a governor. If expecting to be unavailable for a short period only, the governor with the consent of the premier, usually commissions the lieutenant-governor to act as deputy governor, performing some or all of the powers and functions of the governor.

James Angus AO FAA is the current lieutenant-governor.

== Commonwealth ==
There is no position of Lieutenant Governor-General in Australia. But there are a number of people who are empowered to assist the Governor-General in the administration of the Commonwealth.

The Vice-President of the Executive Council is, as a matter of course, appointed a Deputy to the Governor-General under Section 126 of the Constitution for the purposes of summoning meetings of the Executive Council, presiding at meetings of the Executive Council in the absence of the Governor-General, and appointing a Minister as Deputy to the Governor-General for the purpose of presiding at a meeting of the Executive Council in the absence of the Governor-General and the Vice-President.

The Chief Justice of the High Court of Australia is appointed as Deputy of the Governor-General to open sessions of the Australian Parliament and administer oaths or affirmations of allegiance to new Senators and Members of Parliament after opening parliament.

Each of the State governors normally holds a dormant commission from the Sovereign to act as Administrator of the Commonwealth should the governor-general die, resign, or be absent overseas or on leave. By convention, the longest-serving available State Governor acts as Administrator of the Government of the Commonwealth of Australia. Governors-General regularly appoint State Governors as Deputies of the Governor-General so that they may have assistance performing some of the administrative functions of their office.

Former Governor-General Sir Peter Cosgrove was specially commissioned to act as Administrator of the Government of the Commonwealth of Australia in May 2023, when Governor-General David Hurley and all State Governors were simultaneously absent from the Commonwealth to attend the Coronation of Charles III and Camilla. When the Governor-General attended the state funeral of Elizabeth II the previous year, Governor of Victoria Linda Dessau acted as Administrator.

== History ==
Historically, a lieutenant-governor could also be the deputy of the New South Wales governor in a particular territory. In the early and mid-19th century, lieutenant-governors ran Australasian sub-colonies that were initially subordinate to the colony of New South Wales, such as Van Diemen's Land (Tasmania), Victoria and the Bay of Islands (New Zealand).
