= John Coles (diplomat) =

British diplomat

Sir Arthur John Coles GCMG (born 13 November 1937) is a retired British diplomat. He served as the Permanent Under-Secretary of State for Foreign Affairs (Head of HM Diplomatic Service) from 1994 to 1997.

Coles joined the FCO in 1960. After learning Arabic he was posted as Third Secretary in Sudan from 1962 until 1964. He served as the Assistant Political Agent, Trucial States (Dubai) from 1968 to 1971 as the UAE was being established. He returned to London until being sent as Head of Chancery to the British Embassy in Egypt from 1975 to 1977. He served as Ambassador to Jordan, High Commissioner to Australia before he returned to London as Deputy Under-Secretary of State from 1991 to 1994. In 1994 he was appointed Permanent Under-Secretary of State.

== Offices held ==
Diplomatic posts
Preceded by Alan Urwick	British Ambassador to Jordan; 1984-1988	Succeeded by Patrick Eyers
Preceded by Sir John Leahy	British High Commissioner to Australia; 1988-1991	Succeeded by Sir Brian Barder
Government offices
Preceded by Unknown	Deputy Under-Secretary of State, Asia and the Americas, of the Foreign and Commonwealth Office; 1991-1994	Succeeded by Unknown
Preceded by Sir David Gillmore	Permanent Secretary of the Foreign and Commonwealth Office; 1994-1997	Succeeded by Sir John Kerr
