= Roger Carrick =

Sir Roger Carrick KCMG LVO

British High Commissioner to Australia
- In office 1994–1997
- Monarch: Elizabeth II
- Prime Minister: Tony Blair; John Major
- Preceded by: Brian Barder
- Succeeded by: Alex Allan

British Ambassador to Indonesia
- In office 1990–1994
- Monarch: Elizabeth II
- Prime Minister: John Major
- Preceded by: William White
- Succeeded by: Graham Burton

Personal details
- Born: 13 October 1937 (age 88)
- Education: Isleworth Grammar School; School of Slavonic and East European Studies
- Occupation: Diplomat, author, business advisor

Sir Roger John Carrick KCMG LVO (born 13 October 1937) is a former British diplomat and an author and business adviser.

== Career ==
Carrick was educated at Isleworth Grammar School (now Isleworth and Syon School). He passed the examination for Her Majesty's Foreign Service, later Diplomatic Service in 1956, but spent only 11 days there before departing for National Service in the Royal Navy 1956–58, during which he learned Russian at the Joint Services School for Linguists. He then returned to the Foreign Office (later the Foreign and Commonwealth Office, FCO). He served in London, and was sent to the School of Slavonic and East European Studies at London University in 1961 to do a degree course in Bulgarian language and literature in one year. He served at Sofia, Paris and Singapore, was a visiting fellow at the Institute of International Studies at the University of California, Berkeley, 1977–78, and a Political Counsellor at the Washington Embassy 1978–82. After further service at the FCO, he was made Consul-General at Chicago 1985–88, Assistant Under-Secretary (Economic) at the FCO 1988–90, Ambassador to Indonesia 1990–94 and High Commissioner to Australia 1994–97.

After a farewell tour of Australia in the High Commission's champagne oyster-coloured Rolls-Royce Silver Spur III. Carrick retired from the Diplomatic Service in 1997 at the then mandatory age of 60. He has been chairman of various companies including Strategy International and Lime Finance.

Carrick was appointed LVO in 1972 and CMG in the New Year Honours of 1983, and knighted KCMG in the Queen's Birthday Honours of 1995.

== Publications ==
- East-West technology transfer in perspective, Institute of International Studies, University of California, Berkeley, 1978. ISBN 0877255091
- RolleroundOz: reflections on a journey around Australia, Allen & Unwin, 1998. ISBN 1864489529
- Admiral Arthur Phillip RN, founder & first governor of Australia: a British view, Menzies Centre for Australian Studies, London, 2011
- Diplomatic Anecdotage: Around the World in 40 Years, Elliott & Thompson, London, 2012. ISBN 1907642552

Various articles in learned and other journals, chapters in books, including Symphony for Australia (2007), The Foreign Office, Commerce and British Foreign Policy in the Twentieth Century, Palgrave Macmillan 2017 ISBN 978-1-137-46580-1

Diplomatic posts
Preceded by William White	British Ambassador to Indonesia; 1990–1994	Succeeded by Graham Burton
Preceded by Sir Brian Barder	British High Commissioner to Australia; 1994–1997	Succeeded by Alex Allan
