= List of high commissioners of the United Kingdom to South Africa =

The British high commissioner to South Africa is the head of the United Kingdom's diplomatic mission in the Republic of South Africa.

As fellow members of the Commonwealth of Nations, the United Kingdom and South Africa exchange high commissioners rather than ambassadors, and the high commissioner's office in Pretoria is the high commission rather than the embassy. However, from 1961 to 1994 South Africa was not a member of the Commonwealth, so for that time the British head of mission was an ambassador and his office was the embassy.

Besides the high commission in Pretoria, the UK maintains a consulate-general in Cape Town. The high commissioner to South Africa is also accredited to the Kingdom of Eswatini (formerly Swaziland), but a resident high commissioner to Eswatini has been appointed and is expected in post in summer 2019. From 2005 to 2019 the high commissioner to South Africa was also accredited to the Kingdom of Lesotho.

The Republic of South Africa is the historical successor to the Union of South Africa, which came into being on 31 May 1910 with the unification of four previously separate British colonies: Cape Colony, Natal Colony, Transvaal Colony and Orange River Colony. It included the territories formerly part of the Boer republics annexed in 1902, South African Republic and Orange Free State. The Union of South Africa was a dominion of the British Empire which became sovereign (along with other dominions) in 1931. The Union became the Republic of South Africa in 1961; the country left the Commonwealth of Nations at that time but rejoined in 1994.

== High commissioners to the Union of South Africa ==
From 1910 to 1931 the governor-general also held the office of high commissioner: see Governor-General of the Union of South Africa.

- 1931–1935: Sir Herbert Stanley
- 1935–1939: Sir William Clark
- 1940–1941: Sir Edward Harding
- 1941–1944: William Ormsby-Gore, 4th Baron Harlech
- 1944–1951: Evelyn Baring
- 1951–1956: John Le Rougetel
- 1955–1959: Percivale Liesching
- 1959–1961: Sir John Maud

== Ambassadors to the Republic of South Africa ==
- 1961–1963: Sir John Maud (later Lord Redcliffe-Maud)
- 1963–1966: Sir Hugh Stephenson
- 1966–1969: Sir John Nicholls
- 1970–1973: Sir Arthur Snelling
- 1973–1976: Sir James Bottomley
- 1976–1979: Sir David Scott
- 1979–1982: Sir John Leahy
- 1982–1984: Sir Ewen Fergusson
- 1984–1987: Sir Patrick Moberly
- 1987–1991: Sir Robin Renwick
- 1991–1994: Sir Anthony Reeve

== High commissioners to the Republic of South Africa ==
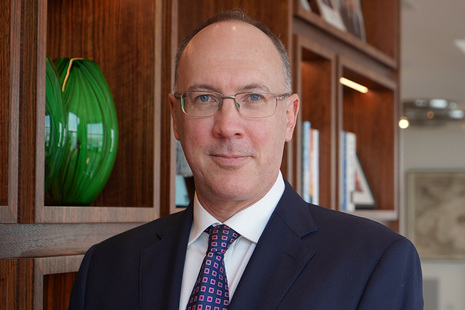
Current high commissioner to South Africa Antony Phillipson

- 1994–1996: Sir Anthony Reeve
- 1996–2000: Dame Maeve Fort
- 2000–2005: Dame Ann Grant
- 2005–2009: Paul Boateng
- 2009–2013: Dame Nicola Brewer
- 2013–2017: Dame Judith Macgregor
- 2017–2021: Nigel Casey
- 2021–: Antony Phillipson

== See also ==
- High Commissioner for Southern Africa
