= James Stevenson (footballer, born 1872) =

Scottish footballer

Personal information
- Date of birth: 31 December 1872
- Place of birth: Dumbarton, Scotland
- Date of death: 3 March 1925 (aged 52)
- Place of death: Dumbarton, Scotland
- Positions: Forward; centre half

Senior career*
Years	Team	Apps	(Gls)
1894–1896	Dumbarton	23	(5)
1896–1898	Preston North End	51	(22)
1898–1899	Bristol St George	?	(?)
1899–1901	Preston North End	30	(5)
1901–1904	West Bromwich Albion	92	(9)
1904–1908	Dumbarton	41	(7)
- * Club domestic league appearances and goals

James Stevenson (31 December 1872 – 3 March 1925) was a Scottish footballer who played for Dumbarton (two spells), Preston North End (two spells), Bristol St George and West Bromwich Albion. For much of his career he played as a forward but in his later years operated at centre half.

He was selected for the annual Home Scots v Anglo-Scots trial match in 1903, but never played for Scotland at full international level.

Stevenson was from Dumbarton, where he was killed in 1925 in a boiler room accident at Denny's Shipbuilding Yard. He had eight children with his wife Jessie Jane, née Strachan; their sixth child was the civil servant Sir Matthew Stevenson.
