= Robin Renwick, Baron Renwick of Clifton =

British diplomat and peer (1937–2024)

The Right Honourable The Lord Renwick of Clifton KCMG
- Clifton speaking in Parliament, 2015

Member of the House of Lords
- Lord Temporal
- Life peerage 26 September 1997 – 31 March 2018

British Ambassador to the United States
- In office 1991–1995
- Monarch: Elizabeth II
- Prime Minister: John Major
- Preceded by: Sir Antony Acland
- Succeeded by: Sir John Kerr

British Ambassador to South Africa
- In office 1987–1991
- Monarch: Elizabeth II
- Prime Minister: Margaret Thatcher; John Major
- Preceded by: Sir Patrick Moberly
- Succeeded by: Sir Anthony Reeve

Personal details
- Born: Robin William Renwick; 13 December 1937 Clifton, York, England
- Died: 4 November 2024 (aged 86)
- Spouse: Annie Renwick
- Children: 3
- Education: Jesus College, Cambridge

Robin William Renwick, Baron Renwick of Clifton (13 December 1937 – 4 November 2024), was a British diplomat, author and a member of the House of Lords who served as British ambassador to South Africa (1987−1991) and to the United States (1991−1995).

== Early life and education ==
Born in Clifton, York, to Richard Renwick, a pharmacist, and Clarice Henderson, he won a scholarship to St Paul's School in London. After completing his national service as a despatch rider in Malta and Libya, he studied at Jesus College, Cambridge (which made him an honorary fellow in 1992), and later at the Sorbonne in France.

== Career ==
Renwick joined the Foreign Office in 1962 and was posted to Dakar, New Delhi and Paris, as well as serving as private secretary to the Minister of State for Foreign Affairs, Joseph Godber (1970−1972), and in the Cabinet Office. In 1978 he joined the Foreign and Commomwealth Office's Rhodesia department, where he helped organise the conferences that led to the Lancaster House Agreement, and in 1980 was a political adviser to Christopher Soames, the last colonial Governor of Southern Rhodesia.

After a brief sabbatical at Harvard University in the United States, Renwick worked in the British embassy in Washington before returning to London in 1984 as assistant under-secretary for Europe at the time of Margaret Thatcher's negotiation of the British rebate in the budget of the European Economic Community. He later served as the British ambassador to South Africa (1987−1991) during negotiations to end apartheid and to the United States (1991−1995).

Having retired from the diplomatic service, Renwick advised Tony Blair on foreign policy. He entered private business, serving on the boards of various companies, including Robert Fleming & Co., Richemont and J.P. Morgan & Co.

== Honours ==
Renwick was appointed a Companion of the Order of St Michael and St George (CMG) in the 1980 New Year Honours and was promoted to Knight Commander (KCMG) in the 1989 New Year Honours.

He was given a life peerage as Baron Renwick of Clifton, of Chelsea in the Royal Borough of Kensington and Chelsea, on 26 September 1997. He initially sat as a Labour peer but became a crossbencher in 2007. He retired from the House of Lords in 2018.

== Personal life and death ==
Renwick was married twice: first, in 1965, to Anne-Collette Guidicelli, whom he had met at the Sorbonne and with whom he had a daughter and a son; and second to Ann Bracken, with whom he had another son.

Lord Renwick died from complications of lung disease, on 4 November 2024, at the age of 86.

== Bibliography ==
Renwick was the author of several books:

- A True Statesman: George H. W. Bush and the 'Indispensable Nation' (London: Biteback Publishing, 2023) ISBN 9781785907845
- Not Quite A Diplomat: A Memoir (London: Biteback Publishing, 2019) ISBN 9781785904592
- How to Steal a Country: State Capture and Hopes for the Future in South Africa (London: Biteback Publishing, 2018) ISBN 9781785903618
- Fighting With Allies: America and Britain in Peace and War (London: Biteback Publishing, 2016) ISBN 9781849549790
- The End of Apartheid Diary of a Revolution (London: Biteback Publishing, 2015) ISBN 9781849548656
- Helen Suzman Bright Star In A Dark Chamber (London: Biteback Publishing, 2014) ISBN 9781849546676
- A Journey with Margaret Thatcher (London: Biteback Publishing, 2013) ISBN 9781849545334

== Notes ==
Diplomatic posts
Preceded by Sir Patrick Moberly	British Ambassador to South Africa; 1987–1991	Succeeded by Sir Anthony Reeve
Preceded by Sir Antony Acland	British Ambassador to the United States; 1991–1995	Succeeded by Sir John Kerr
