= List of high commissioners of the United Kingdom to Australia =

High Commissioner of the United Kingdom to Australia
- Coat of arms of the United Kingdom
- Incumbent; Brian Jones; Acting since 18 May 2026
- Style: His Excellency
- Residence: Canberra
- Inaugural holder: Sir Geoffrey Whiskard
- Formation: 1936
- Website: British High Commission Canberra

The high commissioner of the United Kingdom to Australia is an officer of the Foreign, Commonwealth and Development Office and the United Kingdom's foremost diplomatic representative to the Commonwealth of Australia. Despite Britain's close relationship with Australia, the first high commissioner from London was not appointed until 1936, owing to the clarification of Britain's relations with the imperial dominions after the Statute of Westminster 1931.

== Office history ==
From the beginning of the British colonisation in 1788 and after Australia's federation in 1901, the governor-general and the various state governors had been the official representatives of the British government, as well as the Crown. Following the 1926 Imperial Conference and the subsequent Balfour Declaration an Australian, Sir Isaac Isaacs, became Governor-General in January 1931. Being an Australian, it was felt in London he couldn't properly represent the British Government. They thus appointed their representative for migration in Melbourne Ernest Tristram Crutchley as their first representative of His Majesty's Government in Australia, pending the nomination of a high commissioner, on the Canadian model.

That same year, the Statute of Westminster made easier the creation of such high commissions in the dominions but as the Australian Government delayed its ratification, the United Kingdom had to wait until 1936 to appoint a high commissioner to regularise the role of the Governor-General in Australia, six years before Australia's actual ratification of the Statute.

== Office-holders ==
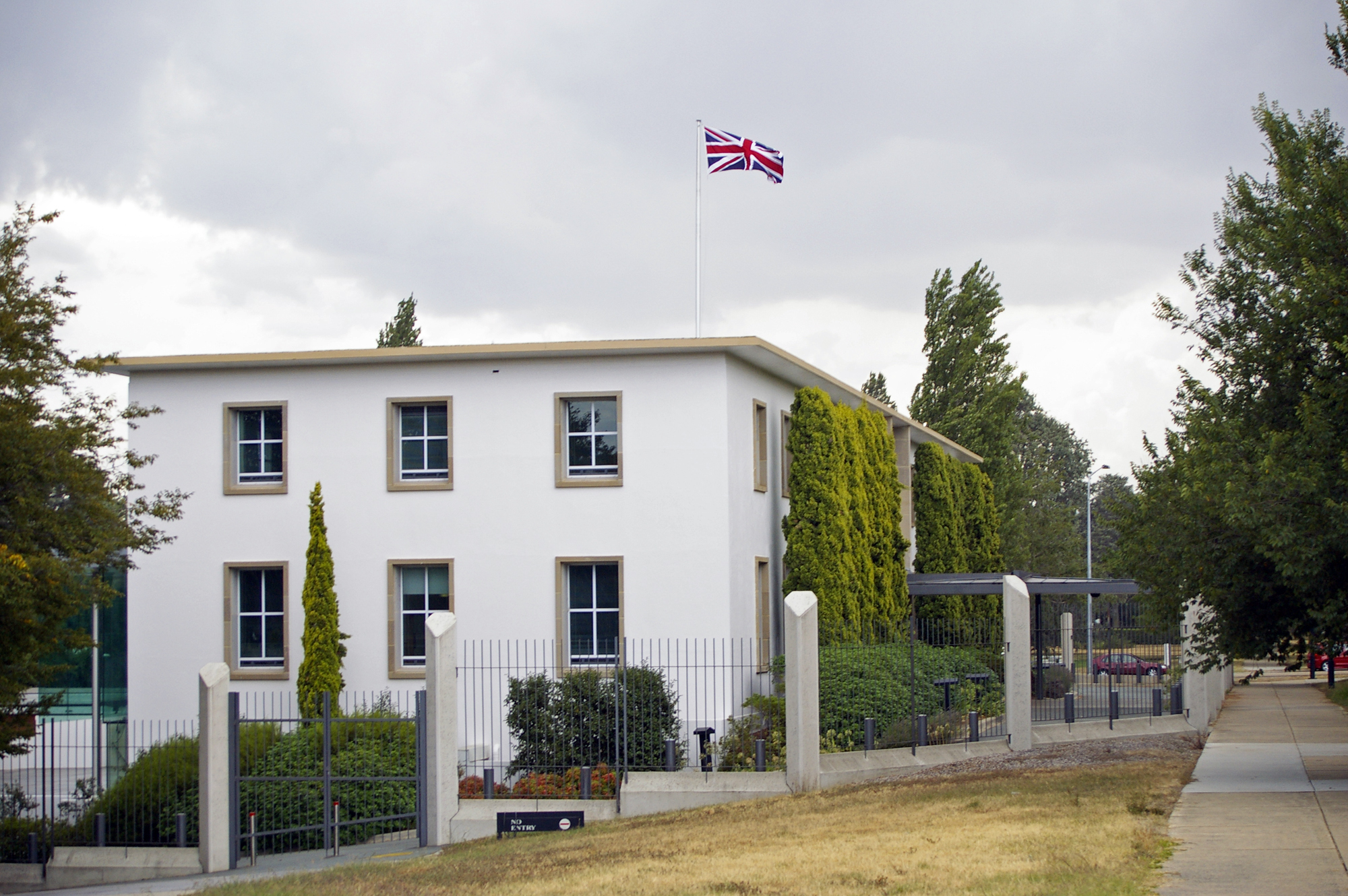
The British high commission in Canberra

High commissioner	Start of term	End of term
Sir Geoffrey Whiskard, KCB, KCMG	1936	1941
Sir Ronald Cross, 1st Baronet, KCMG, KCVO, PC	1941	1945
Sir Ted Williams, KCMG, PC	1946	1952
Sir Stephen Holmes, KCMG, MC	1952	1956
The Lord Carrington, KG, GCMG, CH, MC, PC, DL	1956	1959
Lieutenant General Sir William Oliver, GBE, KCB, KCMG	1959	1965
Sir Charles Johnston, GCMG, KStJ	1965	1971
Sir Morrice James, GCMG, CVO, MBE, PC	1971	1976
Sir Donald Tebbit, GCMG	1976	1980
Sir John Mason, KCMG	1980	1984
Sir John Leahy, KCMG	1984	1988
Sir John Coles, GCMG	1988	1991
Sir Brian Barder, KCMG	1991	1994
Sir Roger Carrick, KCMG, LVO	1994	1997
Sir Alex Allan, KCB	1997	1999
The Lord Goodlad, KCMG, PC	1999	2005
The Baroness Liddell of Coatdyke, PC	2005	2009
The Baroness Amos, LG, CH, PC	2009	2010
Paul Madden, CMG	2011	2015
Menna Rawlings, DCMG	2015	2019
Victoria Treadell, CMG, MVO	2019	2025
Dame Sarah MacIntosh, DCMG	2025	2026
