= Brian Barder =

British diplomat (1934–2017)

Sir Brian Barder KCMG
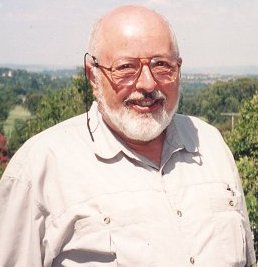
- Barder in 1998

British High Commissioner to Australia
- In office 1991–1994
- Monarch: Elizabeth II
- Prime Minister: John Major
- Preceded by: Sir John Coles
- Succeeded by: Sir Roger Carrick

British High Commissioner to Nigeria
- In office 1988–1991
- Monarch: Elizabeth II
- Prime Minister: Margaret Thatcher; John Major
- Preceded by: Sir Martin Ewans
- Succeeded by: Sir Christopher MacRae

British Ambassador to Poland
- In office 1986–1988
- Monarch: Elizabeth II
- Prime Minister: Margaret Thatcher
- Preceded by: Sir John Albert Leigh Morgan
- Succeeded by: Sir Stephen Barrett

British Ambassador to Ethiopia
- In office 1982–1986
- Monarch: Elizabeth II
- Prime Minister: Margaret Thatcher
- Preceded by: Robert Tesh
- Succeeded by: Sir Harold Walker

Personal details
- Born: 20 June 1934 Bristol, England
- Died: 19 September 2017 (aged 83) Trinity Hospice, London
- Spouse: Jane Maureen Cornwell
- Children: Virginia, Louise, Owen
- Education: St Catharine's College, Cambridge
- Profession: Diplomat
- Website: http://www.barder.com

Sir Brian Leon Barder KCMG (20 June 1934 – 19 September 2017) was a British diplomat, author, blogger and civil liberties advocate.

== Life and career ==
Barder was born in Bristol, the son of Harry and Vivien Barder. He was educated at Sherborne School and St Catharine's College, Cambridge, where he was a member of the Footlights, the Cambridge University Musical Comedy Club, the St Catharine's College Boat Club and the Cambridge University Labour Club (chairman, 1957).

Barder did his National Service as 2nd Lieutenant, 7th Royal Tank Regiment, in Hong Kong (1952–1954). He joined the Colonial Office in London in 1957 (Private Secretary to the Permanent Under-Secretary, 1960–61). He transferred to the Diplomatic Service in 1965. From 1964 to 1968 he was First Secretary, UK Mission to the United Nations, dealing with decolonisation. He returned to the Foreign and Commonwealth Office in London as Assistant Head of West African Department, including dealing with Biafra (1968–71). He became First Secretary and Press Attaché, Moscow (Soviet Union) (1971–73); and Counsellor and Head of Chancery, British High Commission, Canberra (Australia) (1973–77). In 1977-78 he was a course member at the Canadian National Defence College, Kingston, Ontario. In 1978 he returned to London as Head of Central and Southern, later Southern African Department, Foreign and Commonwealth Office (1978–82). He was British Ambassador to Ethiopia (1982–86); Ambassador to Poland (1986–88); High Commissioner to Nigeria and concurrently Ambassador to Bénin (1988–91) and High Commissioner to Australia (1991–94).

He was appointed KCMG in 1992.

In 1958 Barder married Jane Maureen Cornwell. They had two daughters and one son, and two granddaughters. He lived in Earlsfield, London, with his wife.

== The Ethiopian famine ==
Barder was British Ambassador to Ethiopia during the Ethiopian famine of 1984-85. He played a key role in making possible the deployment of the Royal Air Force to Ethiopia for 14 months to move relief supplies from the ports to remote parts of the country where it was urgently needed. His role in the relief effort is described in The Ethiopian Famine, and A Year in the Death of Africa. In 2009 he took part in a BBC Radio 4 programme which brought together some of the key people involved in the Ethiopian famine including International Red Cross nurse Claire Bertschinger (now Dame Claire); BBC reporter Michael Buerk; Dawit Wolde Giorgis, former head of the Ethiopian Relief and Rehabilitation Commission; and Hugh Goyder, former head of Oxfam's Ethiopia programme.

== After retirement ==
After retirement, Barder served on the Commonwealth Observer Mission, Namibian elections (1994); and as a Chair of Civil Service Selection Boards (1995–96). He was a Know-How Fund Consultant for diplomatic training in East and Central Europe (1996); a member of the Committee of the Speech and Debate Centre of the English-Speaking Union (1996–2009); a member of the Board of Management of the Royal Hospital for Neuro-disability (1996–2003); a founder member of the Special Immigration Appeals Commission (1997–2004); and Honorary Visiting Fellow to the Department of Politics and International Relations, University of Leicester (2006- ).

== Resignation from the Special Immigration Appeals Commission ==
Barder was appointed to the Special Immigration Appeals Commission (SIAC) in November 1997, three years after his retirement from the diplomatic service. He resigned in January 2004 when the Government extended the role of SIAC in a way which he believed to be contrary to Britain's international obligations. He set out the reasons for his resignation in the London Review of Books and in The Guardian. The Anti-terrorism, Crime and Security Act of 2001 made SIAC additionally responsible for hearing appeals by persons indefinitely detained without trial by the Home Secretary on suspicion of being connected with terrorism but who could not be deported because there was no country to which they could safely be sent. Barder took the view, subsequently endorsed by the Law Lords, that sending people to prison indefinitely and without trial and without even being charged with any offence was a breach of Britain's obligations under the European Convention on Human Rights and the Human Rights Act 1998. On 16 December 2004 the Law Lords ruled that Part 4 was indeed incompatible with the European Convention on Human Rights, but under the terms of the Human Rights Act 1998 it remained in force. It has since been replaced by the Prevention of Terrorism Act 2005.

== Blogging and publications ==
After retiring from the Diplomatic Service, Barder wrote a popular blog and was a regular contributor to the LabourList website. He had articles and letters published in The Political Quarterly, London Review of Books, Prospect, The Times, The Guardian, The Hague Journal of Diplomacy, and elsewhere. He was Editorial Consultant for A Dictionary of Diplomacy and contributed to the Third Edition of Fowler's Modern English Usage.

Barder's book, What Diplomats Do: The Life and Work of Diplomats was published in July 2014. Not a diplomatic memoir, it describes a diplomat's day-to-day life and work through a typical but fictitious diplomatic career. It has been described as "massively authoritative, and original ... a brilliant book" (G R Berridge, Emeritus Prof., Leicester University); "excellent ... I found reading its chapters irresistible, like eating peanuts" (Prof. Alan Henrikson, Tufts University).

Barder wrote and kept a diary during his overseas postings, covering some of his time in the USSR, Ethiopia, Poland and Nigeria. His daughter Louise edited and published the diary in June 2019, with the title Brian Barder's Diplomatic Diary.

Diplomatic posts
Preceded by Robert Tesh	British Ambassador to Ethiopia; 1982–1986	Succeeded by Sir Harold Walker
Preceded by Sir John Albert Leigh Morgan	British Ambassador to Poland; 1986–1988	Succeeded by Sir Stephen Barrett
Preceded by Sir Martin Ewans	British High Commissioner to Nigeria; 1988–1991	Succeeded by Sir Christopher MacRae
Preceded by Sir John Coles	British High Commissioner to Australia; 1991–1994	Succeeded by Sir Roger Carrick
