= Patrick Moberly =

British diplomat (1928–2024)

Sir Patrick Hamilton Moberly KCMG

British Ambassador to Israel
- In office 1981–1984
- Preceded by: John Robinson
- Succeeded by: William Squire

British Ambassador to South Africa
- In office 1984–1987
- Preceded by: Sir Ewen Fergusson
- Succeeded by: Sir Robin Renwick

Personal details
- Born: 2 September 1928
- Died: 13 January 2024 (aged 95)
- Spouse: Mary Frances Penfold (m. 1955; died 2019)
- Children: 3
- Education: Winchester College
- Alma mater: Trinity College, Oxford
- Occupation: Diplomat

Sir Patrick Hamilton Moberly KCMG (2 September 1928 – 13 January 2024) was a British diplomat. He served as the British Ambassador to Israel and British Ambassador to South Africa, "two of the most sensitive postings for a British diplomat".

== Early life and family ==
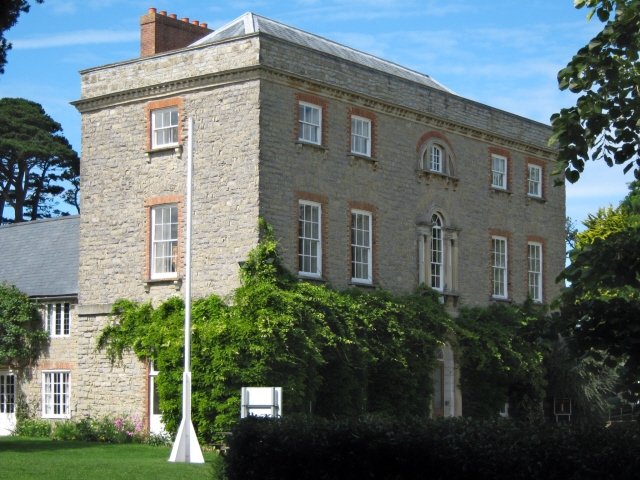
Kilve Court in Somerset was Moberly's maternal grandparents' estate.

Moberly was born on 2 September 1928 to Alice Violet (née Cooke-Hurle) and George Hamilton Moberly, the youngest son of the theologian Robert Campbell Moberly. His great grandfather was George Moberly, former headmaster of Winchester College (1835-1866) and later Bishop of Salisbury (1869-1885). Moberly's maternal grandparents, Colonel Joseph and Mrs Cooke-Hurle, were owners of the Kilve Court manor in Kilve, Somerset, which Moberly and his family often visited in his childhood. The property has since been sold to Somerset County Council.

Moberly was his parents' younger of two sons, his brother Michael George Moberly born 3 years earlier. He was educated at Winchester College before completing his national service between 1946 and 1948. Following his national service, he read history at Trinity College, Oxford and graduated in 1951.

== Career ==
Having graduated from Oxford, Moberly joined the Foreign Service in 1951. In 1953, he was appointed Third Secretary (Commercial) at the British Embassy in Baghdad, followed by a promotion to Second Secretary in 1956. He was transferred to Prague in 1957, where he served as chargé d'affaires in 1958. He was transferred to the Foreign Office in 1959 and was promoted to First Secretary there the following year. This was followed by a transfer to the embassy in Dakar, Senegal in 1962, where he had his second run of being a chargé d'affaires. He went on to work for the Ministry of Defence and the Commonwealth Office before being posted to Canada.

He worked at the British embassy in Israel as Counsellor (Commercial) from 1970 to 1974. He then served as Head of Personnel Policy Department at the Foreign and Commonwealth Office between 1974 and 1976. He was Assistant Under-Secretary of State for Defence and International Security at the FCO between 1976 and 1981. During this time, he chaired the Nuclear Suppliers Group and skilfully navigated the Cold War tension between American, French and Russian counterparts.

From 1981 to 1984 Moberly served as British Ambassador to Israel, before serving as British Ambassador to South Africa between 1984 and 1987, during which time he was closely involved in British efforts to bring about an end to Apartheid.

== Honours ==
Moberly was appointed a Companion of the Order of St Michael and St George (CMG) in the 1978 New Year Honours. He was promoted to Knight Commander of the Order of St Michael and St George (KCMG) in the 1986 New Year Honours.

== Personal life and death ==
Moberly married Mary Frances, née Penfold, in 1955 and had with her 1 daughter and 2 sons. His wife died in 2019.

Moberly died on 13 January 2024, at the age of 95.

== See also ==
- Israel–United Kingdom relations
- South Africa–United Kingdom relations

Diplomatic posts
Preceded by Sir Ewen Fergusson	British Ambassador to South Africa; 1984–1987	Succeeded by Sir Robin Renwick
Preceded by John Robinson	British Ambassador to Israel; 1981–1984	Succeeded by William Squire
