= John Kerr, Baron Kerr of Kinlochard =

British politician and diplomat (born 1942)

The Right Honourable The Lord Kerr of Kinlochard GCMG
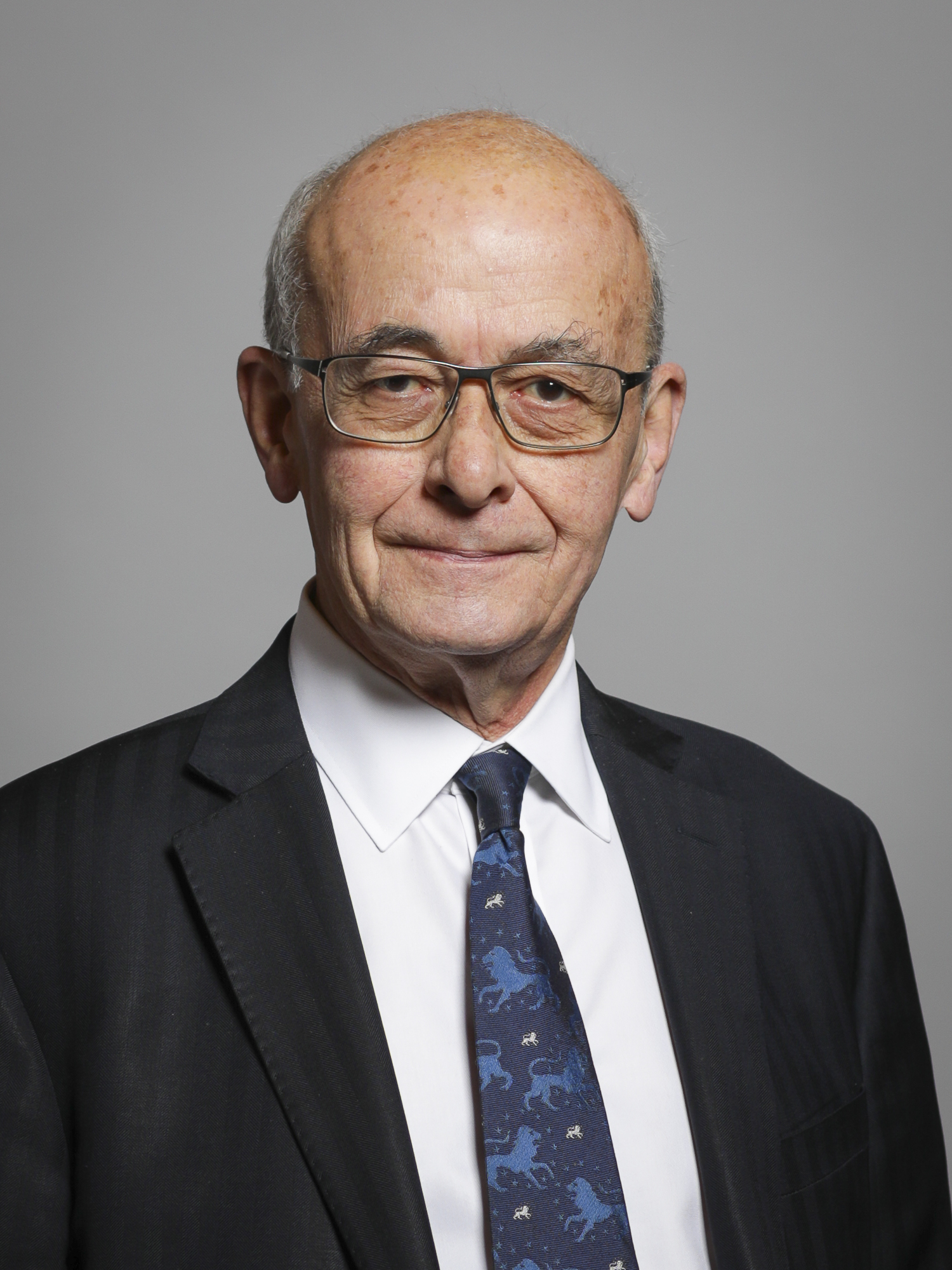
- Kinlochard in 2019

Member of the House of Lords
- Lord Temporal
- Life peerage 30 June 2004

Permanent Under Secretary of State of the Foreign and Commonwealth Office
- In office 1997–2002
- Prime Minister: Tony Blair
- Preceded by: Sir John Coles
- Succeeded by: Sir Michael Jay

British Ambassador to the United States
- In office 1995–1997
- Prime Minister: John Major
- Preceded by: Sir Robin Renwick
- Succeeded by: Sir Christopher Meyer

British Permanent Representative to the European Union
- In office 1990–1995
- Prime Minister: John Major
- Preceded by: Sir David Hannay
- Succeeded by: Sir Stephen Wall

Personal details
- Born: 22 February 1942 (age 84) Grantown-on-Spey, Morayshire, Scotland (now within the Highland Council area)
- Education: Pembroke College, Oxford

John Olav Kerr, Baron Kerr of Kinlochard GCMG (born 22 February 1942) is a British former diplomat and civil servant, and is a crossbench member of the House of Lords. He was a member of the European Convention that first drafted what became Article 50 of the Lisbon Treaty, which came into force in December 2009. He later served for a period as Deputy Chairman of Scottish Power.

== Background and education ==
Born in Grantown-on-Spey, he was educated at Glasgow Academy and at Pembroke College, Oxford (BA modern history 1963). He has Honorary degrees from the Universities of St Andrews, Aston and Glasgow. He is a Fellow of Imperial College London and of the Royal Society of Edinburgh, and an Honorary Fellow of Pembroke College, Oxford.

== Diplomatic career ==
He served in the British Diplomatic Service from 1966 until 2002. This included postings at the British Embassy in Moscow, and at the High Commission in Rawalpindi, Pakistan. He was Private secretary to the Permanent Under Secretary at the Foreign and Commonwealth Office from 1974 until 1979, and was on secondment to HM Treasury from 1979 until 1984, during which time he was Principal Private Secretary to the Chancellor of the Exchequer from 1981 until 1984. He was Head of Chancery at the British Embassy in Washington, D.C., from 1984 until 1987, then Assistant Under Secretary at the Foreign and Commonwealth Office from 1987 until 1990.

He was Ambassador and UK Permanent Representative to the European Communities/European Union in Brussels from 1990 until 1995, and Ambassador to the United States in Washington from 1995 to 1997. Returning to London in 1997, he was Permanent Under-Secretary at the Foreign Office and Head of the Diplomatic Service until 2002. After leaving UK Government service he was Secretary General of the European Convention in 2002/3.

He was appointed to the Order of St Michael and St George as a Companion in the 1987 Birthday Honours, was promoted to be a Knight Commander in the 1991 New Year Honours, and to be a Knight Grand Cross in the 2001 Birthday Honours. Three years later, his life peerage was announced on 1 May and was raised to the peerage as Baron Kerr of Kinlochard, of Kinlochard in Perthshire. In the House of Lords he has served on the EU Select Committee and three of its Sub-Committees, and currently is a member of its Economic Select Committee.

He is a Trustee of the Refugee Council, and a Trustee, and deputy chairman, of the Carnegie Trust for the Universities of Scotland. He was Chairman of the Court and Council of Imperial College London from 2005 to 2011; a Trustee of the National Gallery from 2002 to 2010, and the Rhodes Trust from 1997 to 2010; a Fulbright Commissioner from 2003 to 2009; a member of the Steering Committee of the Bilderberg Group from 2004 to 2016 (3); and UK President of the UK/Korea Forum for the Future from 2007 to 2013.

He is Chairman of the Centre for European Reform, a member of the executive committee of the Trilateral Commission, and President of St Andrew's Clinics for Children.

== Business career ==
He became a Director of Shell Transport and Trading in 2002, and chaired the group of Directors who brought about the creation in 2005 of Royal Dutch Shell plc, of which he was deputy chairman and Senior Independent Director until 2012. He was a Director of Rio Tinto from 2003 to 2015. He has been a Director of the Scottish American Investment Trust since 2002, and of Scottish Power Ltd since 2009. He became Deputy Chairman of Scottish Power in 2012.

== Views on Brexit ==
Before the 2016 Referendum, Lord Kerr had argued that leaving would mean that "our influence across the world would shrink", and looking back in a lecture at the University of Bath on 26 January 2017 he remarked, "We have been strong in Brussels because we have been strong in Washington, and we have been strong in Washington because we have been strong in Brussels."

He has maintained, in House of Lords speeches and in a BBC interview, that since an Article 50 notification is revocable during the two-year negotiation period, the UK could change its mind and choose to stay in the EU even after exit negotiations had begun. Speaking at an event organised by the Institute for Government, Lord Kerr said: "In my view, immigration is the thing that keeps this country running. We native Brits are so bloody stupid that we need an injection of intelligent people, young people from outside who come in and wake us up from time to time." In response to the remarks, Peter Lilley MP (a Eurosceptic Conservative) walked out of the event, and said he had considered reporting the peer to the police for hate speech and being "racially abusive of the British people".

== Boris Johnson ==
In an August 2017 article, Lord Kerr criticised Boris Johnson, "Callaghan, Carrington, Howe, Hurd... Foreign Secretaries used to cut ice abroad, particularly in Europe and America. But maybe that’s not Boris’s game".

== Personal ==
In 1965, he married Elizabeth Mary Kalaugher, daughter of the late New Zealand athlete Wilfrid Kalaugher. They have two sons and three daughters.

Diplomatic posts
| Preceded by Sir David Hannay | UK Permanent Representative to the European Union; 1990–1995 | Succeeded by Sir Stephen Wall |
| Preceded by Sir Robin Renwick | British Ambassador to the United States; 1995–1997 | Succeeded by Sir Christopher Meyer |
Government offices
| Preceded by Sir John Coles | Permanent Secretary of the Foreign and Commonwealth Office; 1997–2002 | Succeeded by Sir Michael Jay |
Orders of precedence in the United Kingdom
| Preceded by The Lord Griffiths of Burry Port | Gentlemen; Baron Kerr of Kinlochard | Followed by Chris Patten |
