= Isleworth and Syon School =

Isleworth & Syon School

Location
- Ridgeway Road; Isleworth, Greater London, TW7 5LJ; England
- Coordinates: 51.480280°N 0.34128°W

Information
- Type: Academy
- Motto: Finis coronat opus ("The end crowns the work")
- Established: 1630 (as The Blue School); 1903
- Department for Education URN: 137940 Tables
- Ofsted: Reports
- Head teacher: Simon Fisher and Jo Higginbottom
- Gender: Male
- Age: 11 to 18
- Enrolment: 1016
- Houses: Adam, Brunel, Shackleton, Turner
- Colours: Red, Orange, Yellow
- Website: http://www.isleworthsyon.org

Isleworth & Syon School (formerly Isleworth Grammar School) is a non-denomination secondary school and sixth form for boys aged 11 to 18 years old. Girls are admitted to the school's sixth form, which is part of a consortium with other secondary schools in the borough. The school is situated on Ridgeway Road, Isleworth, within the London Borough of Hounslow, England. It is close to the A4, just south of Osterley Park. It has many travel links including Isleworth railway station, Osterley tube station and London Buses.

== History ==
Isleworth & Syon School can trace its history to the establishment of a charity school in 1630, making it one of the oldest schools in the area. It began in c. 1630 as Dame Elizabeth Ellis School for Girls and was located in a house in Isleworth. In the eighteenth century, the school became known as The Blue School. Its location, in Old Isleworth, may still be seen in the square.

An Upper Department was created in 1883 and was established as a model school in which students from Borough Road College could practise, and new methods of teaching could be tested. In 1906, Middlesex County Council and the British & Foreign School Society assumed control of the school, by now located in St Johns Road, Isleworth.

In 1939 the boys' school, named Isleworth County School, moved to Ridgeway Road where it has been ever since. Under the Education Act 1944 it became a grammar school. During the 1950s and 60s, 'IGS' gained a particularly high academic reputation under the paternalistic if firm leadership of headmasters Arthur Brierley and then G.J.P. 'Toad' Courtney. When Hounslow Council adopted the comprehensive system, it merged with Syon School for Boys in 1979 to form the current school and appropriately renamed Isleworth & Syon School.

The North Street Girls' School was the female counterpart to the original Blue School. A separate infant school was founded near the girls' school and many children continued their education at the boys' school. It only came under the Blue Schools Foundation in the early 20th century. During the interwar period the girls' school became a coeducational junior school, later merging with the infant school. This school is still operating to this day under the original name "The Blue School".

== Academics ==
In 2003, the school gained sports college status. On 1 March 2012, the school gained academy status.

The school forms a consortium with other secondary schools in the borough. Consortium schools have a common academic timetable, allowing sixth form students to interact and exchange lessons.

In 2005, the school was named sports college of the year in the UK under the guidance of former olympian Jason Wing.

== Notable former pupils ==
- Reece James – Chelsea footballer
- Mo Farah – former Olympic 10,000m and 5000m champion
- Taheen Modak - professional actor
- Myles Peart-Harris – professional footballer
- Owais Shah – former England cricketer
- Gautam Malkani – author and journalist
- Chris Plummer – former professional footballer for Queens Park Rangers
- Michael Bryan – former professional footballer for Watford
- Prince Patel – professional boxer

=== Isleworth Grammar School ===
- Sir Roger Carrick – ambassador to Indonesia 1990–1994, high commissioner to Australia 1994–1997
- Tom Newman (musician) – co-founder of Virgin Records, producer of Mike Oldfield's 'Tubular Bells', composer, guitarist (1954–1956)
- Frederick William Hedges, British Army lieutenant and recipient of the Victoria Cross during the First World War (Isleworth County School)
- Grahaeme Henderson, OBE Engineer and Maritime Executive, Fellow of the Royal Academy of Engineering
- Geoffrey Lilley – professor of aeronautics and astronautics at the University of Southampton from 1964 to 1982
- Sir Richard Shepherd – Conservative MP for Aldridge-Brownhills from 1979 to 2015
- Alan Whitehead – Labour MP for Southampton Test since 1997
- Mark Woodnutt – Conservative MP for the Isle of Wight from 1959 to 1974
