= Ernest Crutchley =

British civil servant (1878–1940)

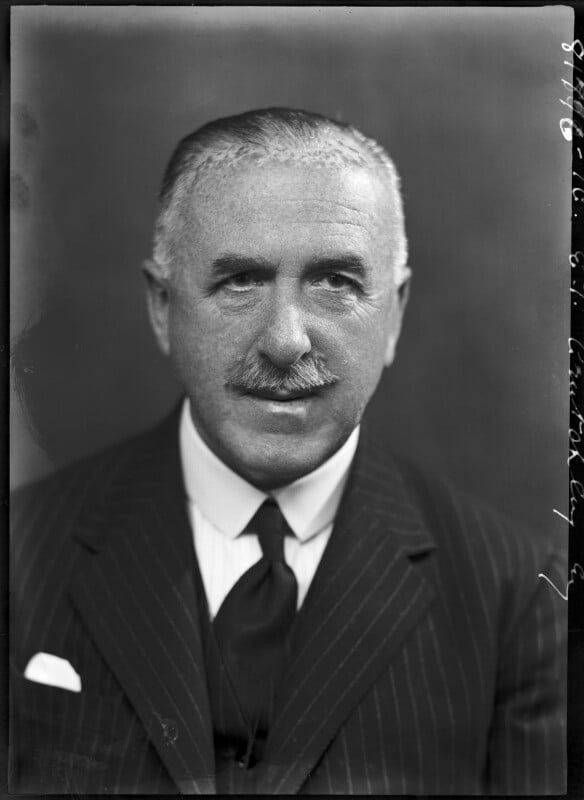
Crutchley in 1936

Ernest Tristram Crutchley CB CMG CBE (10 February 1878 – 5 October 1940) was a British civil servant who was the predecessor of the first British High Commissioner to Australia.

== Career ==
Crutchley was educated at Emanuel School and joined the Post Office as a "boy clerk" in 1893. In 1909 he was promoted from clerk to Assistant Surveyor "upon a special recommendation from the Postmaster-General." During World War I he was appointed to organise the Army postal service and was commissioned in the Royal Engineers with the rank of Captain. He ended the war as an acting Lieutenant colonel and was appointed OBE. After the war he served in the Ministry of Transport 1919–21, then on the staff of the last Chief Secretary for Ireland at Dublin Castle until the establishment of the Irish Free State in 1922. In 1928 he was appointed "British Government Representative for Migration in Australia", and in 1931 he became "Representative in the Commonwealth of Australia of HM Government in the United Kingdom" pending the appointment of the first British High Commissioner to Australia. In 1935 he was recalled by the Post Office to serve as Public Relations Officer, then was Public Relations Officer in the Ministry of Home Security, 1939–40 "to undertake the difficult task of explaining to the public the importance of the new Civil Defence measures." He retired due to ill health shortly before his death.

Crutchley was appointed an Officer of the Order of the British Empire (OBE) in 1919 and promoted to Commander of the Order (CBE) in the 1926 Birthday Honours. He was appointed a Companion of the Order of St Michael and St George (CMG) in the 1932 New Year Honours and CB in the 1935 Birthday Honours.

Diplomatic posts
New title	Representative in the Commonwealth of Australia of HM Government in the United Kingdom; 1931–1935	Succeeded by Sir Geoffrey Whiskard as High Commissioner
