= Section 126 of the Constitution of Australia =

Section 126 of the Constitution of Australia provides for the Sovereign to authorise the Governor-General to appoint a deputy or deputies to assist in the execution of their duties.

Given the vast size of the country, and the primitive transport arrangements when the constitution was drafted in the late 19th century, it was convenient for the Governor-General be able to delegate some of their duties to deputies.

This provision was inspired by Section 14 of the Canadian Constitution Act, 1867 which establishes a power to appoint Deputies of the Governor General of Canada.

== Text ==
The Queen may authorise the Governor-General to appoint any person, or any persons jointly or severally, to be his deputy or deputies within any part of the Commonwealth, and in that capacity to exercise during the pleasure of the Governor-General such powers and functions of the Governor-General as he thinks fit to assign to such deputy or deputies, subject to any limitations expressed or directions given by the Queen; but the appointment of such deputy or deputies shall not affect the exercise by the Governor-General himself of any power or function.

== Application ==
In September 2008, Elizabeth II issued the current Letters Patent relating to the Office of Governor-General. Part IV of that Letters Patent authorises the Governor-General to appoint deputies. State governors available in cases of urgency have been appointed with authority to exercise a wide range of powers and functions, including giving royal assent to new proposed laws.

=== Text ===
In pursuance of section 126 of the Constitution of the Commonwealth of Australia —

(a) We authorise the Governor-General for the time being, by instrument in writing, to appoint any person, or any persons jointly or severally, to be his or her deputy or deputies within any part of the Commonwealth, to exercise in that capacity, during the Governor-General's pleasure, such powers and functions of the Governor-General as he or she thinks fir to assign to that person or those persons or them by the instrument, but subject to the limitations expressed in this clause; and

(b) We declare that a person who is so appointed to be deputy of the Governor-General shall not exercise a power or function of the Governor-General assigned to him or her on any occasion —

(i) except in accordance with the instrument of appointment;

(ii) except at the request of the Governor-General or the person for the time being administering the Government of the Commonwealth that he or she exercise that power or function on that occasion; and

(iii) unless he or she has taken on that occasion or has previously taken the Oath or Affirmation of Allegiance in the presence of the Governor-General, the Chief Justice, or another Justice of the High Court of Australia or the Chief Judge or another Judge of the Federal Court of Australia or of the Supreme Court of a State or Territory of the Commonwealth.
