= Geoffrey Whiskard =

British civil servant and diplomat

Sir Geoffrey Whiskard KCB KCMG
- Sir Geoffrey Whiskard, c. 12 September 1935

British High Commissioner to Australia
- In office 1936–1941
- Succeeded by: Sir Ronald Cross, 1st Baronet

Personal details
- Born: 19 August 1886 Beckenham, Kent
- Died: 19 May 1957 (age 70) 13 Mill Street, Mildenhall, Suffolk
- Education: Wadham College, Oxford

Sir Geoffrey Granville Whiskard KCB KCMG (19 August 1886 – 19 May 1957) was a British civil servant and diplomat.

== Early life and education ==
Whiskard was born at 3 Hartington Villas, Penge Road, Beckenham, Kent, to Ernest Whiskard, a local bank manager, and Lucy Marian Sutton, daughter of a political analyst. Shortly after, the family moved to Kensington because Geoffrey's father had been appointed manager of the Capital and Counties Bank's local branch.

Whiskard was educated at St Paul's School, London, and then in December 1904 he won a scholarship to Wadham College, Oxford, going up in October of the next year. He gained first class in Mods and Greats, graduating in 1909.

== Career ==
Whiskard entered the Home Office in 1911 and served as an Assistant Secretary to the Chief Secretary for Ireland during the Anglo-Irish War, then in the Colonial Office 1922–1925 and in the Dominions Office 1925–1935. He was High Commissioner to Australia 1936–1941, and Permanent Secretary at the Ministry of Works 1941–1943 and at the Ministry of Town and Country Planning 1943–1946.

== Personal life ==
In 1915, he married Cynthia Reeves, having three children Richard, Mary and John. On 30 July 1940, his wife died of heart failure brought on by a severe asthma attack whilst visiting Sydney. Whiskard later remarried to Eileen Margaret Anderson after he had retired from government.

== Writings ==
In 1947, Letters from a Civil Servant to his Son was published. Whiskard had decided the keep his name anonymous. The letters in Whiskard's book are addressed to Richard, the oldest son, and chronicle major parts of his life whilst covering heartfelt themes of love and war. His leaving school, enrolling in Oxford University and at the outbreak of the Second World War, where he joined the Welsh Guards. It was here Richard became friends with the esteemed painter Rex Whistler. Lieutenant Richard Whiskard died on Wednesday, 2 August 1944, at the age of 24.

== Sources ==
- WHISKARD, Sir Geoffrey (Granville), Who Was Who, A. & C. Black, 1920–2015; online edn, Oxford University Press, 2014.

Diplomatic posts
New office	High Commissioner to Australia; 1936–1941	Succeeded by Sir Ronald Cross
Government offices
Preceded by Office established	Permanent Secretary, Ministry of Town and Country Planning; 1943–46	Succeeded by Sir Thomas Sheepshanks
