= Maeve Fort =

British diplomat

Dame Maeve Fort DCMG DCVO
- Born: 10 November 1940; Liverpool, Lancashire, United Kingdom
- Died: 18 September 2008 (aged 67); London, United Kingdom
- Occupation: Diplomat

Dame Maeve Geraldine Fort DCMG DCVO (19 November 1940 – 18 September 2008) was a British diplomat. During her posting as the United Kingdom's High Commissioner in South Africa from 1996 to 2000, she was the highest ranking female diplomat in Her Majesty's Diplomatic Service.

== Early life ==
Born on 19 November 1940 in Liverpool, Fort was the only child of a hospital administrator. She attended Nantwich Grammar School, but left before completing her A-Levels when she discovered that Trinity College, Dublin did not then require entrants to have taken them.

She achieved a sufficiently good degree in English and French to gain a scholarship for study at the Sorbonne from the French government.

== Foreign Office ==
=== Early career ===
Fort decided to apply to join the Foreign Office, despite the fact that she was advised that as a female, and not even an Oxbridge graduate, she had little chance of being selected. However, she became one of just twelve successful candidates to be appointed to the junior grade at the Foreign Office in 1962.

Postings to New York City, Bangkok (a secondment to SEATO), Bonn and Lagos followed, with appointment as an officer in the Diplomatic Service on 24 April 1973. Fort was later promoted to First Secretary at the Foreign and Commonwealth Office, and in 1978, she returned to New York as part of the UK's mission to the United Nations. Here, she began to specialise in African affairs, in particular on the Namibia contact group, working towards a peaceful independence for Namibia. At one time, she was told to prepare for a posting to the High Commission in Windhoek, Namibia, but it was suddenly cancelled.

=== Chile, Mozambique and Lebanon ===
Fort returned to the UK in 1982, to study at the Royal College of Defence Studies for a year. She was then promoted to counsellor and posted to Santiago, Chile. She was recalled to the Foreign Office in 1986, serving as head of the West African department, and concurrently as non-resident Ambassador to Chad, which was then considered too dangerous to host a resident ambassador, due to the ongoing Chadian–Libyan conflict.

Fort was then appointed Ambassador to Mozambique in 1989. Mozambique was still in the throes of its civil war and Fort became involved in the negotiations to bring the conflict to and end, building contacts between President Joaquim Chissano and the RENAMO leader, Afonso Dhlakama. She was appointed a Companion of the Order of St Michael and St George (CMG) in the 1990 New Year Honours.

In 1992, Fort volunteered to become Ambassador to Lebanon, another dangerous posting. She had a close protection team of six bodyguards from the Royal Military Police — Fort referred to them as 'her boys'. The situation in Lebanon was such that she lived in a fortified compound, and travelled in an armoured Range Rover — her escape was walking in the Lebanese mountains, still accompanied by 'the boys', one of whom carried her beloved dog, Chloe, a white Pomeranian-Maltese cross, in a knapsack.

=== South Africa ===
Fort was appointed High Commissioner to South Africa in 1996, two years after Nelson Mandela became the first black president of that country. She soon became a friend and confidant of Mandela and other high-ranking South Africans.

In 1997, her previous association with negotiations relating to Namibia and Mozambique, proved useful again as the situation in Angola deteriorated. She hosted Prince Charles on an official visit, shortly after the death of Diana, Princess of Wales.

Fort was promoted to Dame Commander of the Order of St Michael and St George (DCMG) in 1998, and became a rare 'double dame' when she was appointed Dame Commander of the Royal Victorian Order (DCVO) on 9 November 1999, during Queen Elizabeth II's state visit to South Africa.

== Death ==
Dame Maeve Fort died in London, aged 67, following a short illness.

== Sources ==
- Charters, David (3 October 2008). "Dame Maeve Fort dies". Liverpool Daily Post.
- Kennedy, Helena (26 February 1999). "Mandela leaves the chamber to glorious singing. I try to imagine it in the Commons". New Statesman. Archived from the original on 9 January 2011.
- "Former British Ambassador to Lebanon Dame Maeve Fort remembered". Now Lebanon. 29 September 2008.
- "Former British High Commissioner to SA, Dame Maeve Fort, dies". UK in South Africa. UK High Commission in South Africa. 19 September 2008.
