= Patrick Eyers =

British diplomat (1933–2023)

Patrick Howard Caines Eyers CMG, LVO (4 September 1933 – 22 December 2023) was a British diplomat who, among other roles, was the last ambassador to the German Democratic Republic in 1990.

== Professional activity ==
Eyers entered the diplomatic service in 1959. Between 1977 and 1981, he worked in Bonn as Counselor at the British embassy in the Federal Republic of Germany.

He spent his last eight years working as a British ambassador. First, from 1985 to 1987, he succeeded Nicholas Bayne in Zaire (also accredited in the Republic of Congo, Rwanda and Burundi) until he was replaced by Robert Cormack. In 1987, Eyers took over from Alan Munro as ambassador to Algeria, after which he was succeeded by Christopher Battiscombe. After that, Eyers became the last British ambassador to the German Democratic Republic in 1990, succeeding Nigel Broomfield. His last dispatch from East Berlin, "farewell to an unloved country", dated 2 October 1990, is kept in the British National Archives. In 1991, he replaced Anthony Reeve as ambassador to Jordan and held this office until his retirement in 1993. Peter Hinchcliffe succeeded him.

== Personal life and death ==
Eyers was born in Bristol on 4 September 1933. He was married from 1960 to the Austrian Jutta Lindheide (* 1935), called Heidi, née Rüsch, a great-granddaughter of the Dornbirn businessman Alfred Rüsch, and had three children.

Eyers died on 22 December 2023, at the age of 90.
