= John Leahy (diplomat) =

Sir John Henry Gladstone Leahy, KCMG (7 February 1928 – 17 November 2015) was a senior British diplomat. He was Ambassador to South Africa from 1979 to 1982, and High Commissioner to Australia from 1984 to 1988. He later became Chairman of Lonrho.

== Early career ==
Leahy was educated at Tonbridge School, Clare College, Cambridge and Yale University.

After National Service in the RAF, Leahy joined the Foreign Office in 1952 at the age of 24. He began his career with a position in the Central Department as Desk Officer, responsible for dealing with the Soviet zone of post-WWII Germany (i.e., East Germany and occupied Austria).

== Diplomat ==
Leahy became assistant private secretary to Selwyn Lloyd, Minister of State, who later became Foreign Secretary during the Suez Crisis. Leahy also served as Foreign Office spokesman and was later seconded for a time to the Northern Ireland Office as Under-Secretary of State.

Back at the Foreign Office, Leahy was appointed ambassador to South Africa and subsequently became the Deputy Under-Secretary of State (DUSS) for Africa and the Middle East. His last diplomatic appointment was as High Commissioner to Australia.

Leahy was appointed a Companion of the Order of St Michael and St George (CMG) in the 1973 Birthday Honours, and promoted to Knight Commander of the Order (KCMG) in the 1981 Birthday Honours.

=== Sensitive assignments ===
Regarded as having "a safe pair of hands", Leahy carried out a number of sensitive assignments on behalf of the British government, and came face to face with leading political figures of the day. For example, in April 1984, he was sent to Jamba in Angola to secure the release of 16 Britons who had been taken hostage by the Angolan rebel leader Jonas Savimbi. At the time, Savimbi's UNITA guerrilla movement was financed and supported militarily by the apartheid regime in South Africa.The mission was successful and Leahy brought the captives back to London.

== Post Foreign Office ==
After his retirement from the Diplomatic Service, Leahy held several non-executive appointments, including being a director of The Observer newspaper, before joining Lonrho as a non-executive director in October 1993. He became Chairman in November 1994. On 2 March 1995, after many internal upheavals, the company board dismissed the controversial businessman (Tiny Rowland), one of the Joint Chief Executives. In 1997 Leahy was succeeded by Sir John Craven.

== Book publication ==
Life of Spice is a book written by Sir John Leahy, published in 2006. The book includes details of his life prior to becoming a career diplomat. It also extensively includes details of his later appointments and travels as Ambassador to South Africa, Deputy Under-Secretary for Africa and the Middle East (including a specific chapter regarding his position in Tehran, Iran as Head of Chancery), and as High Commissioner in Australia. It contains many original photographs and noteworthy mention of his extensive travels, including both personal and professional aspects of his life. It also contains detailed descriptions regarding some of the operations and conflicts in which he was engaged around the world.

== Personal ==
Sir John Leahy died on 17 November 2015 at the age of 87.

Leahy and his wife Anne had four children.

Lady Leahy died on 4 July 2026 at the age of 94.

== Bibliography ==
- A Life of Spice published 12 December 2006
