= Ministry of Housing and Local Government =

Department of the United Kingdom Government

The Ministry of Housing and Local Government was a United Kingdom government department formed following the Second World War, covering the areas of housing and local government.

It was formed, as the Ministry of Local Government and Planning, in January 1951 when functions of the Ministry of Health, which had taken over the powers of the old Local Government Board, were merged with the Ministry of Town and Country Planning, which had been created in 1943. Its name was changed to the Ministry of Housing and Local Government by the new Conservative government following the October 1951 general election.

It was merged in 1970 with the Ministry of Transport and the Ministry of Public Building and Works to form the Department for the Environment.

The ministry was headed by the Minister of Housing and Local Government.

The name was partially revived by the May ministry on 9 January 2018, when the Department for Communities and Local Government was renamed as the Ministry of Housing, Communities and Local Government, with a similar name change applying to its Secretary of State.

== Ministers of Housing ==
- Hugh Dalton (1950–1951; Minister of Town and Country Planning until January 1951)
- Harold Macmillan (1951–1954)
- Duncan Sandys (1954–1957)
- Henry Brooke (1957–1961)
- Charles Hill (1961–1962)
- Keith Joseph (1962–1964)
- Richard Crossman (1964–1966)
- Anthony Greenwood (1966–1970)
- Robert Mellish (1970)
- Anthony Crosland (1969–1970 Secretary of State for Local Government and Regional Planning)
- Peter Walker (1970)
