= 1989 New Year Honours =

British royal recognitions

The New Year Honours 1989 were appointments by most of the Commonwealth realms of Queen Elizabeth II to various orders and honours to reward and highlight good works by citizens of those countries, and honorary ones to citizens of other countries. They were announced on 31 December 1988 to celebrate the year passed and mark the beginning of 1989 in the United Kingdom, Australia, New Zealand, Mauritius, the Bahamas, Grenada, Papua New Guinea, the Solomon Islands, Saint Vincent and The Grenadines, Belize, Antigua and Barbuda, and Saint Christopher and Nevis.

The recipients of honours are displayed here as they were styled before their new honour, and arranged by honour, with classes (Knight, Knight Grand Cross, etc.) and then divisions (Military, Civil, etc.) as appropriate.

== United Kingdom ==
=== Life Peers ===
==== Baroness ====
- The Right Honourable Sally Oppenheim-Barnes, Chairman, National Consumer Council.

==== Barons ====
- Professor Sir Jack Lewis, Professor of Chemistry, University of Cambridge; Chairman, Commission on Environmental Pollution.
- Sir John (Davan) Sainsbury, Chairman, J. Sainsbury plc.

=== Privy Counsellors ===
- Jeremy John Durham (Paddy) Ashdown, MP, Leader Social and Liberal Democratic Party; Member of Parliament Yeovil.
- (Bernard Harold) Ian (Halley) Stewart, MP, Minister of State Northern Ireland Office; Member of Parliament North Hertfordshire.
- David Garro, Baron Trefgarne, Minister of State Ministry of Defence.

=== Knights Bachelor ===
- David Alliance, CBE, Chief Executive, Coats Viyella plc.
- Derek Sydney Birley, Vice-Chancellor, The University of Ulster.
- John Boardman, Lincoln Professor of Classical Archaeology and Art; Fellow, Lincoln College, University of Oxford.
- The Right Honourable Leon Brittan, QC. For political service.
- Professor Bryan Victor Carsberg, Director General, Office of Telecommunications.
- Peter Grenville Cazalet, Deputy Chairman, The British Petroleum Company plc.
- Robert Cowan, Chairman, Highlands and Islands Development Board.
- Cyril Humphrey Cripps, DL. For political and public service.
- Judson Graham Day, Chairman and Chief Executive, The Rover Group plc.
- Evelyn Robert Adrian de Rothschild, Chairman, N M Rothschild & Sons Ltd.
- Reginald Derek Henry Doyle, CBE, Her Majesty's Chief Inspector of Fire Services.
- Graham Newman Eyre, QC. For services to the London Airports Authority.
- Hugh Fish, CBE, lately Chairman, Natural Environment Research Council.
- Peter Walter Gibbings, Chairman, Anglia Television Group plc; lately Chairman, Guardian and Manchester Evening News.
- William Howard Goodhart, QC. For political and public service.
- Matthew Dean Goodwin, CBE. For political service.
- Arthur Alfred Hill, CBE. For political and public service.
- Brian John Hill, Chairman and Chief Executive, Higgs & Hill Group plc.
- Ian Charter MacLaurin, Chairman, Tesco plc.
- Edward Michael Ogden, QC, Chairman, Criminal Injuries Compensation Board.
- Geoffrey Owen, Editor, The Financial Times.
- Eduardo Luigi Paolozzi, CBE, Sculptor.
- William Jeremy Masefield Shelton, MP. For political service.
- Alfred Joseph Shepperd, Chairman and Chief Executive, Wellcome plc.
- Charles Eric Stroud, lately Professor of Child Health, King's College School of Medicine and Dentistry.
- Christopher Stephen Wates, Chairman, The English Industrial Estates Corporation; Chairman, Wates Building Group Ltd.
- William Henry Nairn Wilkinson, Chairman, Nature Conservancy Council.

=== Order of the Bath ===
==== Knight Grand Cross of the Order of the Bath (GCB) ====
Military Division

- Admiral Sir Julian Oswald, KCB.
- Air Chief Marshal Sir Patrick Hine, KCB, Royal Air Force.

Civil Division

- Sir Peter Edward Middleton, KCB, Permanent Secretary, HM Treasury.

==== Knight Commander of the Order of the Bath (KCB) ====
Military Division

- Vice Admiral John Beverley Kerr, Royal Navy.
- Lieutenant General Charles Edward Webb Jones, CBE, Colonel Commandant 3rd Battalion The Royal Green Jackets, Colonel Commandant Royal Army Educational Corps.
- Air Marshal Thomas Henry Stonor, Royal Air Force.

Civil Division

- Anthony Michael William Battishill, Chairman, Board of Inland Revenue.
- Christopher Walter France, CB, Permanent Secretary, Department of Health.

==== Companion of the Order of the Bath (CB) ====
Military Division

Royal Navy

- Rear Admiral Anthony Mansfeldt Norman.
- Rear Admiral David Robert Sherval.

Army

- Major General Paul Donald Alexander, MBE (439931), late Royal Corps of Signals.
- Major General John David Graham Pank (459052), Colonel the Light Infantry.
- Major General Robert Scott, QHS (450391), late Royal Army Medical Corps.
- Major General Christopher Tyler (437190), late Corps of Royal Electrical and Mechanical Engineers.
- Major General Robert William Ward, MBE (443583), late 1st The Queen's Dragoon Guards.

Royal Air Force

- Air Vice-Marshal Richard Christopher Allerton.
- Air Vice-Marshal Kenneth Archibald Campbell.
- Air Vice-Marshal Peter Howard, OBE, (Retired).

Civil Division

- Robert Morrison Ainscow, Deputy Secretary, Overseas Development Administration.
- Sandra Pauline Burns, Parliamentary Counsel, Office of the Parliamentary Counsel.
- Christopher Hugh Cossham, Senior Assistant Director, Department of the Director of Public Prosecutions, Northern Ireland.
- Patricia Ann Cox, lately Under Secretary, Scottish Home and Health Department.
- Zelma Ince Davies, Under Secretary, Department of Health and Social Services, Northern Ireland.
- Roger Garnett Lavelle, Deputy Secretary, Cabinet Office.
- William Frederick Mumford, Grade 3, Ministry of Defence.
- Ronald Martin Oliver, RD, Deputy Chief Medical Officer, Department of Health.
- Jeffrey William Preston, Deputy Secretary, Welsh Office.
- Peter Vivian Henworth Smith, Solicitor, Board of Customs and Excise.
- Anthony William Stephens, CMG, Deputy Secretary, Northern Ireland Office.
- Neville Taylor, lately Director General, Central Office of Information.
- George Morton Wedd, Grade 3, Department of the Environment.
- Roland Hewlett Widdows, Presiding Special Commissioner of Income Tax.
- Roy Williams, Deputy Secretary, Department of Trade and Industry.
- John Wood, Director, Serious Fraud Office.

=== Order of St Michael and St George ===
==== Knight Grand Cross of the Order of St Michael and St George (GCMG) ====
- Sir Crispin Tickell, KCVO. United Kingdom Permanent Representative to the United Nations, New York.

==== Knight Commander of the Order of St Michael and St George (KCMG) ====
- Arthur John Coles, CMG, British High Commissioner, Canberra.
- Nicholas Maxted Fenn, CMG, H.M. Ambassador, Dublin.
- Robin William Renwick, CMG, H.M. Ambassador, Pretoria.
- Arthur Desmond Watts, CMG, QC, Legal Adviser, Foreign and Commonwealth Office.
- The Right Reverend Robert Wilmer Woods, KCVO, Prelate of the Order of Saint Michael and Saint George.

==== Companion of the Order of St Michael and St George (CMG) ====
- James Nicholas Allan, CBE, HM Ambassador, Maputo.
- David Beattie, United Kingdom Deputy Permanent Representative to NATO, Brussels.
- John Brown, Deputy Consul-General and Director of Trade Development, New York.
- Michael Francis Daly, HM Ambassador, San José.
- Stephen Peter Day, HM Ambassador, Tunis.
- Peter John Goulden, Foreign and Commonwealth Office.
- Michael John Llewellyn Smith, Minister, HM Embassy, Paris.
- Ian Warren Mackley, Chargé d'Affaires, HM Embassy, Kabul.
- Jeremy Fell Mathews, JP, Attorney-General, Hong Kong.
- David Joseph Moss, Foreign and Commonwealth Office.
- James Bowen Thomas, Grade 5, Ministry of Defence.
- Michael Jacques Thompson, OBE, Foreign and Commonwealth Office.
- Terence Courtney Wood, Minister, HM Embassy, Rome.

=== Royal Victorian Order ===
==== Dame Commander of the Royal Victorian Order (DCVO) ====
- Mary Elizabeth Hedley-Miller, CB.

==== Knight Commander of the Royal Victorian Order (KCVO) ====
- Charles Annand Fraser, CVO.
- Hon. Angus James Bruce Ogilvy.
- Colonel Hon. Gordon William Nottage Palmer, OBE, TD.
- Wing Commander Kenneth Maxwell Stoddart, AE.

==== Commander of the Royal Victorian Order (CVO) ====
- Ronald William Abbott, CBE.
- Trevor Edwin Chinn.
- Denys Michael Gwilym King.
- Sir (Robert) Andrew Morritt.
- Nigel Leonard Wicks, CBE.
- Lieutenant-Colonel Blair Aubyn Stewart-Wilson, LVO.

==== Lieutenant of the Royal Victorian Order (LVO) ====
- Jeffrey Bertram Cackett, MVO.
- Colonel Charles Herbert Kenneth Corsar, OBE, TD, DL.
- Elizabeth Anne Griffiths, MVO.
- John Oswald Hitchings, MVO.
- Celia Innes.
- Charles Quant, MBE, JP.

==== Member of the Royal Victorian Order (MVO) ====
- Susan Benjamin.
- Cyril Davidson.
- Cyril Sidney Dickman, RVM.
- David Nawton Grimston.
- Sandra Koller.
- Michael Trevor Parker.
- Michael Hugh Lacey Warnes.
- Thomas Archibald Stark Wicks.
- Bridget Anne Wright.

=== Royal Victorian Medal (RVM) ===
==== Bar to the Royal Victorian Medal (Silver) ====
- William Edward Rowe, RVM.

==== Royal Victorian Medal (Silver) ====
- Dobrinka Bambic.
- Grenville Leslie Victor Batterbee.
- Geoffrey Howard Borton.
- Chief Technician Michael Brown, Royal Air Force.
- Stanley Walter Butler.
- George William Cooke.
- Chief Technician Alan Gibson, Royal Air Force.
- Police Constable Dennis William Goldsmith, Metropolitan Police.
- Kenneth Reginald Maynard.
- Arthur Jeffrey Nunn.
- Vincent Payne.
- Sergeant Allan Ritson Peters, Metropolitan Police.
- Chief Petty Officer Marine Engineering Mechanic (Mechanical) Stephen James Turner, (D140964F), Royal Navy.
- Kevan Barry Yoxall.

=== Order of the British Empire ===
==== Knight Grand Cross of the Order of the British Empire (GBE) ====
Military Division

- Air Chief Marshal Sir David Harcourt-Smith, KCB, DFC, Royal Air Force.

Civil Division

- Sir Sze-yuen Chung, CBE, JP. For public service in Hong Kong.

==== Dame Commander of the Order of the British Empire (DBE) ====
Civil Division

- Lydia Dunn, CBE, JP. For public service in Hong Kong.
- Audrey Caroline Emerton. For services to nursing.
- Janet Evelyn Fookes, MP. For political service.
- Margaret Louise Fry, OBE. For political and public service.

==== Knight Commander of the Order of the British Empire (KBE) ====
Military Division

- Air Marshal Frank Martyn Holroyd, CB, Royal Air Force.

Civil Division

- Edward Alexander Johnston, CB, Government Actuary.
- Peter Keith Levene, Chief of Defence Procurement, Ministry of Defence.
- Sir David Chilton Phillips, Professor of Molecular Biophysics, University of Oxford; Chairman, Advisory Board for the Research Council.
- Ian Pelham Todd, President, Royal College of Surgeons.

==== Commander of the Order of the British Empire (CBE) ====
Military Division

Royal Navy

- Commodore Ian Affleck Warden Berry, RD*, DL, Royal Naval Reserve.
- Captain Geoffrey Alan Eades, ADC.
- Surgeon Commodore Raymond Radford, QHS.

Army

- Brigadier John Alexander James Pooler Barr, late Corps of Royal Engineers.
- Brigadier Eric Coulthard, QHDS, late Royal Army Dental Corps.
- Brigadier Henry John Hickman, OBE, Royal Pioneer Corps.
- Colonel Noel Henry Peters, late Royal Army Medical Corps.
- Brigadier Michael Francis Linton Shellard, late Royal Regiment of Artillery.
- Brigadier Michael Robert Topple, ADC, late Royal Corps of Signals.
- The Right Reverend Monsignor John Noctor Williams, Chaplain To The Forces 1st Class, Royal Army Chaplains' Department.

Royal Air Force

- Air Commodore John Frederick Boon.
- Air Commodore David Emmerson, AFC.
- Group Captain Edward David Frith, AFC*, (Retired).
- Air Commodore Joan Hopkins, OBE, Women's Royal Air Force.
- Group Captain John Holt Spencer, AFC.

Civil Division

- Peter Hugh Alexander. For political and public service.
- Thomas Boaz Allen, Opera Singer.
- John Graeme Anderson, Executive Deputy Chairman, Northern Engineering Industries plc.
- Alec Walter Barbour, President, Board of Governors, East of Scotland College of Agriculture.
- Brian James Beedham, Foreign Editor, The Economist.
- David John Binns, General Manager, Warrington and Runcorn Development Corporation.
- Donald Bishop, MC, Chairman, Study Team on Professional Liability in the Construction Industry.
- Alastair Kenneth Lamond Black, DL, Under Sheriff, Greater London.
- Peter Leahy Bonfield, Chairman and Managing Director, ICL Ltd.
- Peter Derek Carr, Regional Director, Northern Region Employment Service, Department of Employment.
- Victor Chambers, lately Chief Executive, Ulster Bank Ltd.
- George Charlton, QPM, Chief Constable, Norfolk Constabulary.
- Robert William Cozens, QPM, lately Director, Police Requirements Support Unit, Home Office.
- John Alister Davidson, Director, Confederation of British Industry, Scotland.
- Denis Fitzgerald Desmond, Chairman, Desmond and Sons Ltd.
- Patrick Lancaster Donovan, Chairman and Managing Director, Allied Mills Ltd.
- Professor Ronald Philip Dore, Director, Japan-Europe Industry Research Centre, Imperial College, University of London.
- Norman Gordon Edward Dunlop, Finance Director, British Airways plc.
- Gerard Howard Fairtlough, Chief Executive, Celltech Group plc.
- Frank Fitzgerald, Board Member and Managing Director, Technical, British Steel Corporation plc.
- Kenneth Peter Foggo, Partner, Arup Associates.
- Brian Leslie Fuller, QFSM, Chief Fire Officer, West Midlands Fire Service.
- Derrick John Fuller, Grade 4, Ministry of Agriculture, Fisheries and Food.
- Norman Gash, Historian. Emeritus Professor, University of St Andrews.
- John Glen Mackay Gau, Independent Television Producer.
- Lester Joseph George, President, Manchester Chamber of Commerce and Industry.
- Donald Henry Grattan. For services to education; Chairman, Council for Educational Technology.
- Roy William Gravenor, Production and Human Resources Director, Royal Mint.
- Leslie Leonard Green, lately Director, Daresbury Laboratory, Science and Engineering Research Council.
- William Thomas Greer, Director of Sewerage, Strathclyde Regional Council.
- Richard Langton Gregory, lately Professor of Neuropsychology and Director of Brain Perception Laboratory, University of Bristol.
- Professor Anthony Gordon Guest, QC. For services to the Department of Trade and Industry on the United Nations Commission on International Trade Law.
- Cyril Keith Gulland, lately Deputy Chief Scientific Officer, Ministry of Defence.
- Donald Philip Harding. For political and public service.
- Maurice Graham Hardy, President and Chief Operating Officer, Pall Corporation; Chairman and Managing Director, Pall Europe Ltd.
- Aubrey Edward Harper, Chairman, Board of Governors, Paisley College of Technology.
- Philip Rowland Francis Harris, Head of Division, Network Operations Services Department, British Telecommunications plc.
- John David Jayne Havard, Secretary, British Medical Association.
- John Malcolm Hayles, Director of Finance, British Nuclear Fuels plc.
- David William St John Heath, For political and public service.
- Peter David Nelson Hedderwick, Managing Director, Aircraft Division, Marshall of Cambridge.
- Richard Higgins, Grade 5, Department of Trade and Industry.
- Arnold Quinney Hitchcock, lately Chairman, Potato Marketing Board.
- John Warwick, Baron Hives. For political service.
- John Hoddell, Deputy Chairman, Chartered Trust plc.
- Christopher Jarvis Haley Hogwood, Director, Academy of Ancient Music.
- Michael De Courcy Fraser Holroyd, Literary Biographer.
- Brian Howard Hord. For political service.
- Caryl Lois Hubbard, lately Chairman, Contemporary Art Society.
- Ian Stuart Hutcheson, Chairman and Chief Executive, Acatos and Hutcheson plc.
- Ralph Iley, Joint Managing Director, Cookson Group plc.
- Sydney Carol Jackson, Assistant Secretary, Northern Ireland Office.
- Professor Andrew Michael Jaffé, Director, Fitzwilliam Museum, Cambridge.
- Angus Norman Johnston, Chairman, Central Council of Probation Committees.
- Betty Joan, Lady Johnston, Chairman, Girls Public Day School Trust.
- William Albert Morgan Jones, Superintending Valuer, Board of Inland Revenue.
- John MacGregor Kendall Kendall-Carpenter. For services to Rugby Union.
- Elihu Lauterpacht, QC, Director, Research Centre for International Law, University of Cambridge.
- Douglas McColl Macinnes. For political and public service.
- David Drury Macklin, lately Chief Executive, Devon County Council.
- Reginald Arthur Edward Magee, lately President, Royal College of Surgeons in Ireland.
- John Peter Mason. For political and public service.
- Timothy Lewis May, TD, DL, Chairman, Territorial Auxiliary and Volunteer Reserve Association, Eastern Wessex.
- Raymond Arthur McCabe, Managing Director, John Brown Engineering Ltd, Clydebank. For services to Export.
- Marshall Meek, Chairman, Marine Technology Board; lately Deputy Chairman, British Maritime Technology Ltd.
- George Albert Moore. For political and public service.
- David Cornelius Morley, lately Professor of Tropical Child Health, Institute of Child Health, University of London.
- Duncan Kirkbride Nichol, Regional General Manager, Mersey Regional Health Authority.
- Reginald Fred Norman, Managing Director, Ciba-Geigy plc; Chairman, British Crop Protection Council.
- Peter Machin North, Chairman, Road Traffic Law Review.
- John Frederick Corfield Olney, Treasury Valuer, HM Treasury.
- John Edward Owen, Deputy Receiver, Metropolitan Police.
- David Bruce Pattullo, Chief Executive, Bank of Scotland.
- Alan Ernest Alfred Read, Professor of Medicine and Director of Medical Professorial Unit, University of Bristol.
- Ian William Richardson, Actor.
- David Edward Roberts. For political service.
- Gordon Roberts, lately Grade 5, Treasury Solicitor's Department.
- Philip Michael Rose, Managing Director, Butterley Brick Ltd; Chairman, Building Materials Export Group.
- Albert Muir Galloway Russell, QC, Sheriff, Aberdeen Sheriff Court, Scottish Courts Administration.
- Michael Edward Wylie Samuelson, Vice-President, National Association for Maternal and Child Welfare.
- Norman Keith Scott, Chairman, Building Design Partnership.
- David Aitken Shaw, Professor of Clinical Neurology, University of Newcastle upon Tyne.
- Michael Shepherd, lately Professor of Epidemiological Psychiatry, Institute of Psychiatry, University of London.
- Peter Geoffrey Shepherd, Chairman, West Sussex County Council.
- Alexander Sherlock, MEP. For political service.
- James Cadzow Smith, Chairman, Eastern Electricity Board.
- Robert Carr Smith, Director, Kingston Polytechnic.
- Frederick Richard Stallard, DL. For political and public service.
- Charles Walter Suckling, Member, Royal Commission on Environmental Pollution.
- Monty Sumray, Chairman and Managing Director, FII Group plc.
- Stanley Thomson, lately President, Chartered Association of Certified Accountants.
- Alan Walker Tyson. Fellow, All Souls College, Oxford. For services to Musicology.
- Geoffrey Henry Whalen, Managing Director, Peugeot Talbot Motor Company Ltd.
- Robert Brian Williamson, lately Chairman, London International Financial Futures Exchange.
- Arthur Brian Wilson, The Chief Commoner, Corporation of London.
- Olgierd Cecil Zienkiewicz, lately Professor and Head of Department, Civil Engineering, University of Wales.
- Richard Radford Best, MBE, lately Deputy British High Commissioner, Kaduna.
- Joseph James Gaggero. For services to commerce in Gibraltar.
- John Anthony Forrestal Hailwood, OBE. For services to British commercial interests in the Eastern Caribbean.
- Dr Ho Kam-fai, OBE, JP. For public and community services in Hong Kong.
- Hu Fa-kuang, OBE, JP. For public and community services in Hong Kong.
- Adrian Ditchburn Johnson, British Council Representative, Malaysia.
- Li Ka-shing, JP. For services to commerce and the community in Hong Kong.
- Bernard Herbert Gordon Mills, lately Director of UNRWA Affairs, Gaza.
- Edwin Mirvish, OC. For services to the Theatre.
- Ian Joseph Sims. For services to British commercial interests and to the community in South Africa.
- Michael Douglas Symington. For services to British commercial and community interests in Portugal.

==== Officer of the Order of the British Empire (OBE) ====
===== Military Division =====
Royal Navy

- Commander Geoffrey Douglas Simon Bryant.
- Commander William John Burling.
- Commander Maurice Edgar Cook.
- Chief Officer Margaret Hope Gosse, Women's Royal Naval Service.
- Commander Keith Alfred Harris.
- Commander Ian Rhoderick Hewitt.
- Lieutenant Colonel Gordon Douglas Birdwood Keelan, Royal Marines.
- Commander Gilbert Ian Mayes.
- Commander Adrian Munns.
- Commander Alan John Spruce.
- Commander Mark Stanhope.

Army

- Lieutenant Colonel Alaistair Michael Cumming, The Gordon Highlanders.
- Lieutenant Colonel Charles Robert Knowles Dean, 14th/20th King's Hussars.
- Lieutenant Colonel Peter David Gardner, The Duke of Wellington's Regiment (West Riding).
- Lieutenant Colonel Charles Alan Colin Heron, The Worcestershire and Sherwood Foresters Regiment (29th/45th Foot).
- Lieutenant Colonel William James Hurrell, 17th/21st Lancers.
- Lieutenant Colonel Stuart Jardine, Corps of Royal Engineers.
- Lieutenant Colonel Christopher David Mackenzie-Beevor, 1st The Queen's Dragoon Guards.
- Lieutenant Colonel William James Marshall, MBE, TD, DL, Royal Corps of Transport, Territorial Army.
- Lieutenant Colonel David Robin Dare Newell, The Worcestershire and Sherwood Foresters Regiment (29th/45th Foot), Territorial Army.
- Acting Lieutenant Colonel Hugh George Lyon Playfair, Combined Cadet Force, Territorial Army.
- Acting Lieutenant Colonel Edward Hugh Frere Sawbridge, Combined Cadet Force, Territorial Army.
- Lieutenant Colonel David Harold Andrew Shephard, The Queen's Regiment.
- Lieutenant Colonel Rupert Nigel Clayton Smales, Corps of Royal Engineers.
- Lieutenant Colonel Roger John Theis, MBE, Corps of Royal Military Police.
- Lieutenant Colonel Norman Jan Piet Walker, TD, Royal Army Medical Corps, Territorial Army.
- Lieutenant Colonel Evelyn John Webb-Carter, Grenadier Guards.
- Lieutenant Colonel Alasdair Allan Wilson, Corps of Royal Engineers.

Royal Air Force

- Wing Commander Eric Banks, MBE.
- Wing Commander Keith Bichard.
- Wing Commander William Michael Nigel Cross.
- Wing Commander Patrick Charles John Herbert.
- Wing Commander Thomas Joseph Hindmarsh.
- Wing Commander Ian Walter Lindsey Royal Air Force Volunteer Reserve (Training).
- Reverend (Wing Commander) Duncan Alexander Fraser Maclennan.
- Wing Commander Roy James Springett.
- Wing Commander Nigel John Sudborough.
- Wing Commander Christopher George Winsland.
- Wing Commander Jeffrey Young.

===== Civil Division =====
- Clifford Raymond Alderton, Chairman and Managing Director, J. Picard and Company, Seed Merchants, Ltd.
- Hugh Doig Archbold, Project Manager, Sheffield and Coventry, Swan Hunter Ltd.
- Catherine Archibald Asher, Chairman, National Board for Nursing, Midwifery and Health Visiting for Scotland.
- Elsie Ashley. For political and public service.
- Diana Clare Banks. For political and public service.
- Ronald Bernard Barnes, lately Headmaster, Great Stony Special School, Chipping Ongar, Essex.
- Richard Henry Howard Barr, Chairman, Centrax Ltd.
- Patrick Hayden Barry, lately Chairman, Joint Contracts Tribunal.
- Peter Markendale Billam, Director, Plant Engineering, Central Electricity Generating Board.
- Neil Cathcart Black, Principal Oboeist, English Chamber Orchestra.
- Bridget Marilyn Bloom, Correspondent, Financial Times.
- Nancy Margetts Bradfield (Mrs Sayer). For services to the history of costume design.
- Margaret Anne Brain (Mrs Wheeler), lately Chief Administrative Nursing Officer, South Glamorgan Health Authority.
- Richard David Briers, Actor.
- Professor Mary Bromly, Head, School of Fashion, Newcastle Polytechnic.
- Peter Walding Bryant, County Planning Officer, West Sussex County Council; Chairman, Technical Liaison Group, South East Regional Planning Conference.
- Morris Burdon, Director, Engineering Employers' Association of South Lancashire, Cheshire and North Wales.
- Michael John Burke, Principal Scientific Officer, Ministry of Defence.
- Colin Middleton Campbell, Director, Bookers Sugar Company Ltd.
- William Challinor. For political and public service.
- Michael Bernard John Clarke, lately National Coordinator of Regional Crime Squads.
- Julia Clements, (Lady Seton), International floral art judge. For charitable services.
- Gerald Clerehugh, Director of Technology, Headquarters, British Gas plc.
- John (Louis) Brunel Cohen, Chairman, "Not Forgotten" Association.
- Bryan Thomas Alfred Collins, QFSM, Chief Fire Officer, Humberside Fire Brigade.
- John Charles Collins, Grade 6, Department of the Environment.
- Roy Eric Coxon, Consulting Engineer; for services to dam engineering.
- Sean Coleman Curran, Director, Standard Telephones and Cables, Northern Ireland, Ltd.
- Leonard Frank Curtis, lately National Park Officer, Exmoor National Park.
- Professor Anthony Ralph Cusens, Head of Civil Engineering Department, University of Leeds; Transport and Road Research Laboratory Visitor.
- Peter Wilton Cushing, Actor.
- Iain Leonard Dale, Chief Executive, Dale Electric International plc. For services to Export.
- Ronald Darrington. For services to the community in Wakefield, West Yorkshire.
- Colonel John Patrick Davey, TD, DL, Association Vice-Chairman (Military) East Anglia, Territorial Auxiliary and Volunteer Reserve Association.
- Ronald Walter Day, Trading Director, Navy, Army and Air Force Institutes, London.
- John Barrie Denton. For services to the Ockenden Venture.
- Francis William Dick, Director of Coaching, British Amateur Athletic Board.
- James Dickson, DL, Leader, Woodspring District Council.
- John Thomson Dickson, Assistant Chief Constable Strathclyde Police.
- Frank Pool Dilkes, Chairman, West Bromwich Building Society.
- Alan Aubrey Dobson, VRD, Chairman, Nottingham Sea Cadet Corps Unit.
- Richard David Allan Dodds. For services to Hockey.
- Professor John Wharry Dundee. For services to Medicine in Northern Ireland.
- Richard David Dunderdale, Principal Collector, Board of Inland Revenue.
- Alastair Barr Dunlop. For political and public service.
- Colonel Peter Arthur William George Durrant (Retd.), Grade 7, Foreign and Commonwealth Office.
- William Albert George Easton, lately Principal, Southgate Technical College.
- Andrew John Eberlein, lately Head, Major Hazards and Environment Co-ordination, Shell U.K. Ltd.
- Albert Charles Edwards. For political and public service.
- John Trevor Egginton, AFC, lately Chief Test Pilot, Westland Helicopters Ltd.
- Charles William Ellis, Chairman, Grampian Health Board.
- John Colin Evans, Headmaster, Sir Thomas Picton Comprehensive School, Haverfordwest, Dyfed.
- Edward Charles Richard Fawcett. For services to the National Trust.
- Robin Leaper Fenton. For political and public service.
- Leonard Ferguson, MBE, lately Director of Housing Management, Scottish Special Housing Association.
- Professor Francis Fish, Dean, the School of Pharmacy, University of London.
- Michael John Fitzherbert-Brockholes, DL. For public service in Lancashire.
- William Bailey Foster, lately Principal, Plymouth College of Further Education.
- Ian Ross Fraser, Rector, Inverness Royal Academy.
- Peter Robert Frazer, Deputy Director-General, Take-Over Panel.
- Aleksa Gavrilovic, lately Technical Director, GEC Transmission and Distribution Group.
- Roger Gibbs, Grade 7, Ministry of Defence.
- William Fulton Gillespie, TD, DL. For public service in Northern Ireland.
- John Smylie Dixon Gilmore, Alderman, Belfast City Council.
- John Goodwin, Managing Director, St Regis Harvesting Company; Chairman, Forest Windblow Action Group.
- Thomas Talbot Anthony Gorsuch, Director of Research and Quality Control, Colmans of Norwich; Member, Food Advisory Committee.
- Ronald Edgar Granger, President, Export Credit Insurance Comprehensive Guarantees Group.
- Barboura Patricia Grant, Joint Managing Director, Norfrost Limited, Castletown.
- Margaret Thomas Johnson Wilson Grant, Brittle Bone Society, Dundee.
- William Greenwood, Assistant Director, Curriculum, Wigan Local Education Authority.
- Owen Gregory, Consultant Mining Surveyor; Member, Black Country Limestone Advisory Panel.
- Anthony Fitzhardinge Gueterbock. For services to the Construction Industry.
- Henry Edward Gumbel, Consultant, Willis Faber Group plc.
- Alexander Derek Gower Gunn, Director, University Health Service, University of Reading.
- Hester Mary Hallaway, Principal, Trinity and All Saints' College, Horsforth, Leeds.
- Christopher Michael Hann, lately Senior Pigs and Poultry Adviser, Ministry of Agriculture, Fisheries and Food.
- Christopher Hannington. For political and public service.
- James Francis Hanratty, lately Medical Director, St Joseph's Hospice, Hackney.
- Gladys Rose Harding, Deputy President, Bedfordshire Branch, The British Red Cross Society.
- Alan George Harris, Grade 7, Laboratory of the Government Chemist.
- Margaret Valerie Harrison, Senior Consultant, Home Start Consultancy.
- Alan John Harvey, Leader, Rochford District Council.
- Edward Walter Hayden, Executive Commissioner and Administration Secretary, The Scout Association.
- John Francis Alexander Heath-Stubbs, Poet.
- Richard David Henshell, Chairman, PAFEC Ltd.
- George Kenneth Frank Holden, MC, TD, Honorary Chairman, West Midlands Central Branch, Soldiers', Sailors' and Airmen's Families Association.
- Robert Holstead, Chief Surveyor, Department of Transport.
- Hywel Hughes. For services to Agriculture in Wales.
- Irma Ann Hulks, Chief Architect, Kent County Council.
- Alan David Hunt, Senior Principal, Ministry of Defence.
- Norman Murray Crawford Isham, Superintending Architect, Department of the Environment.
- Patricia Jeffery. For political and public service.
- Gregory Warwick Johnson. For political and public service.
- Albert Joseph Keeling, Counselling Adviser, North West Region, Small Firms Service.
- Penelope Anne Constance Keith, (Mrs Timpson), Actress.
- Joy Adelaide Mabel Kinsley, Grade I, HM Prison, Brixton.
- Thomas Laurie. For services to the Arts in Scotland.
- Peter Urquhart Lawson, Director of Agriculture, Angus Marts, Forfar.
- Francis Ledwidge, Chairman, Northern Ireland Fishery Harbour Authority.
- Robert Derrick Littlewood, Superintendent of Works, York Minster.
- Arthur Llewellyn Lloyd, Chairman, Advisory Committee on Justices of the Peace, Birmingham.
- Roy Luff, Managing Director, Aluminium Corporation Ltd, Dolgarrog, Gwynedd.
- Malcolm Macdonald, Director of Environmental Health, Falkirk District Council.
- Donald Gordon Macintyre. For services to Education in Northern Ireland.
- Felix Aloysius Mackle, Northern Secretary, Irish National Teachers' Organisation.
- Timothy Hugh Macnamara. For political and public service.
- Andrew Reginald Sprake Marsh, Grade 7, National Physical Laboratory.
- Laurence Martindale, lately Principal, Luton Sixth Form College.
- Richard Moreton Mawditt, Secretary and Registrar, University of Bath.
- Gordon Malcolm McCoombe, Principal Professional and Technology Officer, Ministry of Defence.
- John Lindsay McGavigan, Chairman, John McGavigan and Company Ltd, Kirkintilloch. For services to Export.
- David Henry Harold Metcalfe, Professor and Head of Department of General Practice, Manchester University Medical School.
- Patrick James Moore, Commercial Development Manager, P & O Containers Ltd.
- Joseph Mounsey, BEM, QPM, lately Assistant Chief Constable, Lancashire Constabulary.
- Elizabeth Jane Nicoll. For services to the Tayside Region Girls' Brigade.
- Annette Noskwith. For political and public service.
- Patrick Charles Kenneth O'Ferrall, General Manager, Total Minatome Oil and Gas, United Kingdom.
- George Thomas Oglanby, lately General Manager, Lincoln Division, Anglian Water Authority.
- Robert Henry O'Hanlon, QPM, Chairman, National Road Safety Committee, Royal Society for the Prevention of Accidents.
- Neil Buchanan Osborn, Director of Works, Commonwealth War Graves Commission.
- Denis Peter Owen, Headteacher, Thurnscoe Comprehensive School, Barnsley.
- John Hefin Owen. For services to Medicine in Wales.
- Bernard Harold Michael Palmer, Editor, The Church Times.
- Nigel Webb Palmer, Managing Director, C.W. Pittard and Company Ltd.
- Arnold John Parkinson, lately Member, West Midlands Regional Health Authority.
- Hugh Charles Parkman, Chairman, Parkman Group Consulting Engineers.
- Charles Jellis Paton, Controller, Resource Operations, British Broadcasting Corporation (Television).
- Derek James Patterson. For services to the community in Berkshire.
- John Edmund Pearson, Clerk to the Liverpool Justices.
- Mary Kate Penn, Director, Sino British Trade Council. For services to Export.
- Major Thomas Hope Perkins, (Retd.), lately Chief Administrative Officer, Women's Royal Voluntary Service.
- Norman Pimblett. For services to the St John Ambulance Brigade, Merseyside.
- Domingos Joseph Diago Teodoro Pinto, Consultant Surgeon, General Surgery, Tyrone County Hospital.
- Charles Walter John Pledger. For services to the Royal British Legion.
- William Pleeth, Cellist.
- Rosemary Patricia Nova Pockley. For political and public service.
- Christopher Leslie Pollard. For services to Industry and Tourism in Wales.
- Peter Henry Priestley, Senior Education Officer and Regional Psychologist, Lothian Region.
- Cahal Ramsey, MBE, Assistant Chief Constable, Royal Ulster Constabulary.
- Daniel Reid, Director, Communicable Diseases Scotland Unit, Ruchill Hospital, Glasgow.
- Derek Woodhouse Roberts, Principal Engineer, Sir William Halcrow and Partners, Consulting Engineers.
- Bernard Robinson, Director and Chief Executive, Tallent Engineering Ltd.
- Bryan Allinson Robson, Principal, Department of Social Security.
- William Taylor Robson, President, Northern Ireland Association of Boys' Clubs.
- James Malcolm Rodger. For services to the Glasgow and West of Scotland Committee, National Press Fund.
- John Frank Rogers, Director of Quality Assurance and Chief Nursing Adviser, Hull Health Authority.
- Jenifer Bernice Rosenberg, Managing Director, J. & J. Fashions Ltd.
- Winifred Ida Rouse, Director, International Social Service of Great Britain.
- Vera Rozsa-Nordell, Singing Teacher and Consultant, Guildhall School of Music and Drama.
- Roy Sanderson, Managing Director, Sanderson (Forklifts) Ltd.
- David Robert Shadbolt, Principal, Worcester College of Higher Education.
- Thomas Sharples, Executive Director, Design, Military Aircraft Division, Warton Unit, British Aerospace plc.
- Ronald Archibald Shepherd, Manager, Education Training and Personnel Services, Ford Motor Company.
- Geoffrey Shillito, Director, Trent International Centre for School Technology, Nottinghamshire.
- Alan Shotliff. For political and public service.
- Robert William Skelton, lately Keeper, Indian Department, Victoria and Albert Museum.
- Alec Luke Smith, Divisional Manager, Basic Research Group, Unilever Research.
- Dennis Clayton Smith, Principal Consultant, Plessey Research Ltd.
- Derek Randall Smith, Engineering Director, National Nuclear Corporation Ltd.
- James Patrick Smith, Editor, Journal of Advanced Nursing.
- Jack Richard Speyer. For political service.
- Michael Alexander Spracklen. For services to Rowing.
- Trevor Ferguson Sprott, Director of Planning, Grampian Regional Council.
- John Wilson Steel, HM Inspector of Schools, Department of Education and Science.
- John Hamish Maitland Stein, Export Sales Director, GR-Stein Refractories Ltd, Linlithgow. For services to Export.
- Margaret Jessie Taylor, lately Headteacher, Whalley Range Girls' School, Manchester.
- Robert Richard Taylor, MBE, DL, Managing Director, Birmingham Airport.
- James Bernard Terry, Principal Inspector, Health and Safety Executive, Department of Employment.
- John Husband Thomas, lately Regional Chairman, Wales Region, Air Training Corps.
- John Paul Triseliotis, Director of Social Work Education, University of Edinburgh.
- Ralph Tuck. For political and public service.
- Eric McKenzie Turner, Director and General Manager, P & O Ferries Ltd (Orkney and Shetland Services), Aberdeen.
- Terence Dudley Turner. For services to Pharmacy in Wales.
- James Waddell, Chairman, Manchester, Salford and Trafford Committee for the Employment of Disabled People.
- Derek Waddington, City Housing Officer, Birmingham City Council.
- Ernest John Munro Walker, Secretary, Scottish Football Association.
- John Harley Wallace, Director, Home Division, OXFAM.
- Frank Edwin Warboys, lately Senior Chief Fingerprint Officer, Metropolitan Police.
- Thelma Evelyn Webb, lately Deputy Commissioner, Bedfordshire, St John Ambulance.
- David Brian Whitaker. For services to Hockey.
- John Honour Willmer, Farmer, Clanfield, West Oxfordshire.
- John Grant William Woodruff, Director, Public Affairs, British Railways Board.
- Alan Herbert Yendle, First Class Valuer, Board of Inland Revenue.

- Thomas Clive Almond, lately HM Ambassador, Brazzaville.
- Michael Thomas Smallwood Blick, Administrator, Ascension Island.
- Cyril Donald Bradshaw. For services to British commercial interests in Japan.
- Percival Austin Bramble. For public and community services in Montserrat.
- Simon Michael Jeremy Butler-Madden, Foreign and Commonwealth Office.
- Charles Richard Clarke. For services to British commercial and community interests in Nigeria.
- Professor Dafydd Meurig Emrys Evans, JP. For services to the Faculty of Law, University of Hong Kong.
- Marvie Elton Georges, Deputy Governor, British Virgin Islands.
- Michael John Hardie, First Secretary (Administration), British High Commission, Lagos.
- William Dickson Hewetson. For services to British commercial and community interests in Dubai.
- Tudor Jackson. For services to legal training in Kenya.
- Roland Edouard Vincent Michel King. For services to British commercial interests in France.
- Donald Peter Lines, JP. For public and community services in Bermuda.
- Geoffrey Colin Livesey, First Secretary (Commercial), HM Embassy, Havana.
- Professor Ma Chung Ho-kei. For services to medical education in Hong Kong.
- John Mayatt, British Council Representative, Tanzania.
- Henry Michael Pearson Miles, JP. For services to commerce and aviation in Hong Kong.
- William Smith Millar. For services to British commercial and community interests in Liberia.
- Peter John Reeve Moller. For services to British commercial interests in Kenya.
- Professor Denys Morgan. For services to education and the community in Zambia.
- John Nisbet Morton, For services to British commercial and community interests in Uruguay.
- Raymond Scudamore Newberry, British Council Representative, Australia.
- Dr Nip Kam Fan, JP, Director of Civil Engineering Services, Hong Kong.
- Leo Edmund O'Keeffe. For services to English language teaching in Zambia.
- David James Peate, First Secretary and Consul, HM Embassy, Brussels.
- Major Robert John Peliza, ED. For public service in Gibraltar.
- William Eden Pool, lately a Head of Division, EC Commission, Brussels.
- Peter Poon Wing-cheung, MBE, JP. For public service in Hong Kong.
- John Rawson. For services to British commercial interests in Connecticut, USA.
- Colonel Brian Sinclair Read. For services to British commercial engineering interests in the USA.
- Francis Joseph Savage, First Secretary (Consular), British High Commission, Lagos.
- Thomas Julian Durrant Shepherd. For services to British commercial interests in California.
- David John Spiller, First Secretary (Library and Books), British Council, India.
- Charles Thompson, British High Commissioner, Tarawa.
- Roderick James Tolley. For services to British commercial and community interests in Penang.
- Thomas Robert Henry Stratford Tuite, MBE, Consul, British Consulate, Malaga.
- Duncan Huson Walker. For services to British commercial interests in Barcelona.

==== Member of the Order of the British Empire (MBE) ====
Military Division

Royal Navy

- Lieutenant Commander Ian Adams Campbell.
- Warrant Officer Anthony Frederick James Colbourne.
- Lieutenant (now Lieutenant Commander) John Andrew Connell.
- Warrant Officer Norman Barry Cooke.
- Warrant Officer 1 Graham James Dear, Royal Marines.
- Warrant Officer John Henry Fletcher.
- Lieutenant Commander (SCC) Leslie Hackett, Royal Naval Reserve.
- Lieutenant Commander Christopher John Lishman.
- Lieutenant Commander Thomas McCrimmon.
- Lieutenant Commander Michael Richard Moore.
- Warrant Officer Henry Page.
- Captain Christopher Leonard Taylor, Royal Marines.
- Warrant Officer Anna Jane Weeks, Women's Royal Naval Service.
- Lieutenant Commander John Wilson.

Army

- Captain Ian Colin Ambrose, Corps of Royal Military Police.
- Major Stephen Ashby, The Prince of Wales's Own Regiment of Yorkshire.
- Major James Babington-Smith, Intelligence Corps.
- Major James Edgar Battye, The Parachute Regiment, Territorial Army.
- Captain Brian Walter Bell, 1st The Queen's Dragoon Guards.
- Acting Major John Geoffrey Brewer, Army Cadet Force, Territorial Army.
- Major Frank Derek Burgoyne, TD, Corps of Royal Engineers, Territorial Army.
- Captain Raymond Norman Butcher, Corps of Royal Engineers.
- Captain Eileen Carter, TD, Women's Royal Army Corps, Territorial Army.
- Warrant Officer Class 2 Jack Alan Clarke, The Blues and Royals (Royal Horse Guards and 1st Dragoons).
- Captain Harry Dennison, Royal Tank Regiment.
- Acting Major John Grant Dow, Combined Cadet Force, Territorial Army.
- Major Samuel Murray Drennan, DFC, Army Air Corps.
- Warrant Officer Class 1 Elaine Farrand, Women's Royal Army Corps.
- Major Henry Edward Fleming, Royal Army Ordnance Corps.
- Warrant Officer Class 1 James William Gossip, Royal Corps of Transport, Territorial Army.
- Captain Stephen John Derek Harrison, Royal Tank Regiment.
- Captain David Henry, Royal Corps of Signals, Territorial Army.
- Major Graham William Hodgson, TD, Corps of Royal Engineers, Territorial Army.
- Warrant Officer Class 2 Robert Stephen Hughes, Royal Army Ordnance Corps.
- Major Richard James Jackson, The Royal Anglian Regiment.
- Captain Murdo Alexander Macdonald, Queen's Own Highlanders (Seaforth and Camerons).
- Major Francis Robert Mullens, ED, The Royal Hong Kong Regiment (The Volunteers).
- Major George Taylor Neil, 17th/21st Lancers.
- Captain Martin Nicol, Royal Corps of Signals.
- Captain Peter Stanley Oakley, The King's Regiment.
- Major Nicholas John Walter Parsons, Coldstream Guards.
- Major Colin McFall Peebles, Corps of Royal Engineers.
- Major Richard John Pope, TD, Royal Monmouthshire Royal Engineers (Militia), Territorial Army.
- Captain Philip Andrew Pratley, Royal Corps of Signals.
- Captain David Craigie Rodger, TD, Corps of Royal Engineers, Territorial Army.
- Warrant Officer Class 2 Ronald Arthur Rowe, Royal Regiment of Artillery.
- Captain Michael John Seale, BEM, The Parachute Regiment.
- Major James Sharp, The Gordon Highlanders.
- Major William Francis Shuttlewood, 2nd King Edward VII's Own Gurkha Rifles (The Sirmoor Rifles).
- Captain Stuart Frank Sibley, The Blues and Royals (Royal Horse Guards and 1st Dragoons).
- Captain Robert William Silk, Corps of Royal Military Police.
- Major Duncan Leslie Smith, TD, Royal Corps of Signals, Territorial Army.
- The Reverend David Arthur Tickner, Chaplain To The Forces 3rd Class, Royal Army Chaplains' Department.
- Major John Waddington, Corps of Royal Engineers.
- Lieutenant Michael Joseph Winstanley, The Cheshire Regiment.
- Major Malcolm David Wood, Royal Army Ordnance Corps.
- Major Ronald Bruce Hayward Young, Royal Regiment of Artillery.

Royal Air Force

- Squadron Leader Michael Kenneth Allport (608455).
- Master Aircrew Michael Allen John Anderson (SI943187).
- Warrant Officer John Wilkins Beale, BEM (Q4115543).
- Master Aircrew David Francis Clarkson (U0683186).
- Flight Lieutenant Andrew Geoffrey Cohen (5203846).
- Squadron Leader Robert Bourke Cunningham (5202843).
- Warrant Officer Brian Grindrod (J1932912).
- Flight Lieutenant Eric Hayes (1922443).
- Squadron Leader Nigel Morrell Huckins (5201058).
- Squadron Leader James Llyn John (582609).
- Flight Lieutenant Denys Gilbert Kinsella (193051), Royal Air Force Volunteer Reserve.
- Squadron Leader David Anthony Ian Fitzgerald-Lombard (8022672).
- Squadron Leader Dennis Arthur Longden (4257056).
- Flight Lieutenant Michael James McCleave (209347), Royal Air Force Volunteer Reserve (Training).
- Squadron Leader Gary Graham Martin (8023061).
- Squadron Leader Gwendoline Peggy Paris (2655858), Women's Royal Auxiliary Air Force (Retired).
- Warrant Officer Brian Proctor (R1935853).
- Squadron Leader John Lawrence Shaw (4081448), (Retired).
- Flight Lieutenant (now Squadron-Leader) Alan Alfred South (5201975).
- Flight Lieutenant (now Squadron-Leader) Alan James Swan, QGM, (685685).
- Squadron Leader Paul Royston Thomas (5202367).
- Warrant Officer Robert Lindsay Thomson, BEM, (E4256158).
- Squadron Leader Christopher John Trigg (5202334).
- Warrant Officer David Gordon Umpleby (C1930324).
- Squadron Leader Phillip John Wilcock (8026115).
- Warrant Officer Edward Marcus Willis (H0588559).

Civil Division

- Peter Abel, Statistician, International Tea Committee Ltd.
- Michael David Abrahams, lately Deputy Chairman, John Crowther Group plc.
- John Saunders Adams, Observer Commander, Group Commandant No. 8 Group, Royal Observer Corps.
- Richard Hugh Macgregor Adams, Chairman and Managing Director, Northumbrian Fine Foods plc.
- Angela Mary Alderman, Senior Teacher of the Deaf; Leader, County Audiology Service, Cornwall.
- Kenneth Moss Allan, lately Headteacher, Ellesmere County Primary School, Shropshire.
- Anthony Allcock. For services to Bowls.
- Donald Harold Allison, Public Transport Co-ordinator, Surrey County Council.
- Clare Evelyn Anley, Regional Organiser, Carr-Gomm Society, East Anglia Ltd.
- David Cyril Attrill, lately Chief Superintendent, Metropolitan Police.
- Reginald Eustace Bagnall, lately Northern Staff Photographer, The Press Association.
- James Baird, Chairman, Cumbria and North East Branch, Royal Society for the Prevention of Cruelty to Animals.
- Anne Catherine Banks, lately Headteacher, Cronberry Special School, Ayrshire.
- Jeanne Patricia Barber, Public Relations Officer, Yorkshire and Humberside Region, Association of British Insurers.
- Barbara Mary Barr. For charitable services in Sheffield.
- Peter James Philip Barwell. For political and public service.
- Bernard Arthur Bateman, Chairman, Industrial Associate Liaison Committee, Institute of Plumbing.
- Paul Bates, Sales and Marketing Director, Egerton Hospital Equipment Ltd.
- Clifford Arthur Beard, Chairman, Beard Dove Group.
- Daphne Mary Bell, Principal, Ulster College of Music.
- David Bell. For political service.
- Alice May Bendle, Founder and Chairman, Hartlepool and District Hospice.
- William Charles Bennett. For services to the community in Totnes, Devon.
- Theresa Birkbeck, Higher Executive Officer, Department of Social Security.
- Norman Birnie, District Staff Officer, St John Ambulance Brigade.
- Charles John Bishop, lately Building Supervisor, Bursar's College, University College, University of London.
- Peter Robert Blacker, Associate of Brian Colquhoun and Partners, Consulting Engineers.
- Janet Marion Boardman, Corporate Finance Manager, Rolls-Royce plc.
- Lieutenant-Colonel John Bramwell Booth, (Retd.), County Emergency Planning Officer, Buckinghamshire County Council.
- Eugene Owen Anthony Brady, Higher Executive Officer, Board of Inland Revenue.
- Ewen Crighton Bramwell, General Medical Practitioner. Chairman, Family Practitioner Committee, Surrey.
- Margaret Abigail Brayton, Executive Secretary, Commonwealth Nurses' Federation.
- George Harold Bright, Editorial Supervisor of the Vote, House of Commons.
- Eric John Bristow. For services to Darts.
- John David Broatch. For political service.
- David Morrison Brodie, lately Chairman, Scottish Parent Teacher Council.
- Linda Margaret Broomhead, Area Traffic Warden Controller, Metropolitan Police.
- Ronald Brown, Shipping Manager, Bridon plc.
- Stephen Humfrey Brown. For services to the community in Chester.
- George Browne, General Manager, Delta Enfield Cables Ltd, Belfast.
- Harry Burton, Headteacher, Pallister Park Primary School, Middlesbrough.
- William Cairns, lately Chairman, Prospect Foundation Ltd.
- Beryl Iris Ivy Campbell, Administrative Officer, Department of Social Security.
- Ian Percy Cannell. For services to The Royal British Legion, Isle of Man.
- Cuthbert William Hedley Carr, Staff Officer, Belfast Magistrates' Court.
- Thomas Cartwright, Local Officer I, Department of Social Security.
- Wilfred Cassidy, Scientific Adviser and County Analyst, Somerset County Council.
- Joan Mary Chapman, Executive Officer, Ministry of Defence.
- Roger Stanley Chapman, lately Secretary and Treasurer, Field Studies Council.
- Margaret Jean Chapman-Andrews, Founder, Bridport Arts Society.
- Alfred Walter James Chapple, lately Superintendent Commandant, Constabulary Training School, Winfrith, United Kingdom Atomic Energy Authority.
- Geoffrey Hodgson Cheney, Area Chief Accountant, North Yorkshire Area, British Coal.
- Barbara Clancy, Head, Portwood Nursery School, Stockport.
- Francis Edward George Clements, Chief Examiner, Institute of Advanced Motorists.
- Philip Michael Clowes, Director of Transport, Special Products Division, Tilcon Ltd.
- Frank Robert Coe, Director (Planning), The Welding Institute.
- Anne Collins, Collector, Board of Inland Revenue.
- John Cole Compton, Vice-Chairman, Tay River Purification Board.
- Sidney Clifford Cordle. For political and public service.
- Dorothy Joan Cowell. For services to the community in Kettering.
- Frederick James Cox, Member, Frodsham Parish Council.
- Stanley Hall Cox, Tutor, Welsh School of Architecture.
- Sidney Ronald Croombes, Higher Executive Officer, Department of Social Security.
- Rose Eileen Crozier, Staff Officer, Industrial Development Board for Northern Ireland.
- Martin Cuddihy, Higher Executive Officer, Department for National Savings.
- David Vacey McGill Cuerden, Joint Managing Director, Testech Ltd.
- George Thomas Henry Cushing, Founder, Thursford Museum.
- Anne Sybil Davies, Ward Sister, Surgical Unit, Musgrove Park Hospital, Somerset District Health Authority.
- William Dawson, lately Works Engineer and Energy Manager, Defence Systems Division, Vickers plc.
- Dorothy Mary Day, Divisional Director, Northern Ireland, Save The Children Fund.
- Kenneth Arthur Deighton, Manager, Tame Sewage Treatment District, North West Water Authority.
- Kenneth Whitton Doble, lately Assistant Editor, The Western Morning News.
- Mary Catherine Dobson, Clinical Nurse Specialist in Psychotherapy, Newcastle upon Tyne.
- Joseph Stewart Douglas, Local Officer I, Department of Social Security.
- Elizabeth Duke, lately Higher Executive Officer, Ministry of Agriculture, Fisheries and Food.
- Raymond Eric Duke. For services to the community in Driffield, North Humberside.
- James Dunlop, Higher Executive Officer, Department of Social Security.
- James Durrant. For services to Music, particularly the Viola.
- Tobias William Hammersley Eckersley. For political and public service.
- Clifford Maynard Edwards, Chairman, Midlands Area Improvement Housing Association Ltd.
- Roland Douglas Edwards. For services to the community in Basingstoke, Hampshire.
- John Godfrey Emerson, Higher Executive Officer, Training Commission, Department of Employment.
- Dorothy Margaret England. For political and public service.
- Beatrice Doreen Evans. For services to Nursing in Wales.
- David Hastings Evans, Executive Officer, Employment Service, Department of Employment.
- Edward Raymond Evans, Senior Executive Officer, Ministry of Defence.
- Freda Christine Evans, Executive Chairman, 'Crisis at Christmas'.
- Florence Isabel Dorothy Evans, lately Vice-Principal, College of St Paul & St Mary, Cheltenham. For services to the education services of St Helena.
- Thomas George Evans. For political and public service.
- Douglas Arthur Eyeions, Director-General, Computing Services Association.
- Josephine Hazel Fergus. For political and public service.
- Dr Robert Somerled Cameron Fergusson, lately General Practitioner, Beauly, Inverness-shire.
- John Anthony Findlay. For political service.
- James Finlayson, Fatstock Officer, Meat and Livestock Commission.
- Jean Elizabeth Fleming, lately Assistant Chief Administrative Pharmaceutical Officer, Greater Glasgow Health Board.
- Alice Elizabeth Anne Fletcher, Chief Administrative Officer, Derbyshire College of Agriculture.
- Jill Ford, lately Area Organiser, Home Counties, Women's Royal Voluntary Service.
- Brian William France, Financial Consultant, National Bus Company.
- Wendy Ann Franks, lately Health Visitor Co-ordinator, Islington.
- Hugh Donald George Fraser, QPM. For services to the Scottish Chamber of Safety.
- Gordon Percival French, In-Service Support Manager, Electronic Warfare Division, Marconi Defence Systems Ltd.
- Doreen Sylvia Gilmour, Community Mental Handicap Nurse, Stockport District Authority.
- Thomas Mason Gledhill, Welfare Officer, Cheshire Constabulary.
- Neville Edmund Goss. For services to Motor Cycling.
- Robert Anthony Graham, Assistant Chief Officer, Greater Manchester Fire Service.
- Constance Patricia Grand, lately Senior Personal Secretary, Cabinet Office.
- Lawrence Love Green, lately Senior Regional Secretary, Scotland and North East England, National Union of Seamen.
- Edward Gerald Gregory, Deputy County Director & Head of Branch Training Department, West Yorkshire County Branch, The British Red Cross Society.
- Edna Griffiths, lately Personal Secretary, Board of Inland Revenue.
- Hugh John Gulliver. For political and public service.
- Chris Alexander Hallam. For services to Paraplegic Sports.
- Wright Whiteley Hamer, Chairman, Civilian Management Committee, Huddersfield Sea Cadet Corps Unit.
- Sylvester John Hardwicke, Chairman, Westminster and District Street Traders' Association. For services to the community.
- William Henry Hare. For services to Rugby Union Football.
- Leonard Edward George Harper, lately National Secretary, Road Haulage Association.
- Dorothy Jean Harris, Director of Nursing Services, South Derbyshire Health Authority.
- Ian Hamilton Harrison, lately Director, Leicestershire Association for the Disabled.
- Rosemary Ellen Harrison, Collector, Higher Grade, Board of Inland Revenue.
- William Kingsley Hartley. For services to disabled people in Cheshire.
- Juliet Anne Hayden, lately Schools Liaison Officer, Association of British Insurers.
- John George Hayton, lately Director and General Manager, West Kent Water Company.
- Bridget Almina Suzanne Heaton-Armstrong. For services to the community and for charitable services.
- Edward Hebblethwaite, Secretary, Scarborough, Bridlington, Hull and District Branch, British Limbless Ex-Servicemen's Association.
- William James Henderson, Head of the Electron Microscope Unit, Tenovus Institute for Cancer Research, University Hospital of Wales, Cardiff.
- Betty Holmes, Chairman, Old Basing Parish Council, Hampshire.
- Antony Trevor Hooper, Senior Executive Officer, Board of Customs and Excise.
- William Edmund James Hooper, Vice-Chairman, British Beekeepers Association.
- Stanley Horsley, Senior Professional and Technology Officer, Department of the Environment.
- Robert Howard, Civilian Operating Room Assistant (Anaesthetics), Royal Naval Hospital, Haslar.
- Derrick Hunter, Managing Director, Taylor Hitec Ltd.
- James David Kinahan Hurford, Project Architect, Percy Thomas Partnership.
- Harold Hutchinson, Chief Executive, Road Transport Industry Training Board, Northern Ireland.
- Louisa Hutchinson, Committee Member and former Chairman, Darlington Branch, National Society for the Prevention of Cruelty to Children.
- Isobel May Ingram, lately Principal, Sandbrook Nursery School, Belfast.
- Frederick George Ernest Irwin, Director, Ove Arup and Partners, Consulting Engineers.
- Stuart Irwin, Director, Central Lancashire Engineering Employers' Association.
- Muriel Agnes Jackman, Secretary, League of Friends of the Grimsby Hospitals.
- Cecil Albert James. For services to Youth. General Secretary, Catholic Youth Service.
- James Clemence James, Chairman, North Eastern Sea Fisheries Committee.
- Margaret Anne Jaycock, Community Midwife, Charlotte Keel Health Centre, Bristol.
- Eric Godfrey Jeans, Works and Production Manager, Gowllands Ltd.
- John Morgan Jeremy, Counsellor, Small Firms Service, Reading.
- Thomas William Malcolm John, Assistant Divisional Officer, South Glamorgan Fire Service.
- Elizabeth Marion Elsie Johnson, Education Advisers' Co-ordinating Officer, London Borough of Hounslow.
- Peter Johnson, Managing Director, Saltire Knitwear Ltd, Kilwinning.
- William Johnson, lately Department Manager, Inspection and Instrumentation, Swinden Laboratories, British Steel plc.
- James Alexander Johnston, Superintendent, Fife Constabulary.
- David Haydn Jones. For services to Agriculture in Wales.
- Shankar Janardan Joshi, Executive Officer, Board of Customs and Excise.
- Dorothy Leonara Kavanagh, County Adviser for Primary Education, Oxfordshire.
- Myra Evelyn Kelly, lately Matron, Ramsey Cottage Hospital, Isle of Man.
- Mary Kennedy, Administrative Officer, Department of the Environment.
- Christopher Robin Kimber, lately Chief Executive and General Secretary, Society of Licensed Victuallers.
- Brian Michael King, Higher Executive Officer, Department of Social Security.
- Derek Antony Knibbs, lately Manager, Personnel and Quality, Rank Xerox Ltd.
- Derek Birchell Lane, Superintendent, Avon and Somerset Constabulary.
- Helen Maeve Lanigan Wood, Curator, Fermanagh County Museum.
- Lieutenant Commander Dennis Larkins, Retd, Retired Officer II, Ministry of Defence.
- Lancelot Laycock, Volunteer Member, Kirkman and Rural Fylde, Citizens' Advice Bureau.
- Ronald Geoffrey Stentiford Leleux, Inspector (S), Board of Inland Revenue.
- Evan Lewis, General Secretary and Chief Executive Officer, Farmers' Union of Wales.
- Gerwyn James Lewis, Director, Welsh Division, National Farmers' Union.
- George Frederick Lindop. For services to Rugby Football League.
- Miriam Jean Long, Executive Officer, Lord Chancellor's Department.
- William Douglas MacConnachie, lately Area Wayleave Officer, North of Scotland Hydro-Electric Board.
- Jean Macgregor, Director of Nurse Education Northallerton Health Authority.
- Avril Calder Mackie. For services to mentally disabled people in Glasgow.
- Mary Elizabeth Macpherson, Headteacher, Balbardie Primary School, Bathgate, West Lothian.
- George Millikin Malcolm, Higher Executive Officer, Dounreay, United Kingdom Atomic Energy Authority.
- Joseph Malloch, President, Orkney Fisheries Association.
- Roger Norris Manns. For voluntary services to the Nene Valley Railway.
- Robert Arthur John Marshman, Finishing Manager, Western Board Ltd, Treforest, Mid-Glamorgan.
- Kathleen Rose Martin, Head, Blackburn Minority Ethnic Group Support-Service, Lancashire.
- Alan Martindale, Deputy Secretary, Yorkshire Agricultural Society.
- Lilias Elizabeth Mason, lately Senior Professional and Technology Officer, Ministry of Defence.
- Pauline Kathleen Eleanor Mateer. For services to the Board of Visitors, Her Majesty's Prison, Belfast.
- Florence Matthews, Administrative Officer, Department of Health.
- John Joseph McAfee, Chief Superintendent, Royal Ulster Constabulary.
- James McClatchey, Forest Education and Public Relations Officer, Department of Agriculture, Northern Ireland.
- Doreen McCraw, lately Finance Officer, Middlesex Probation Service.
- James Craig McFadzean, Chairman, Lapwing Lodge Scout Training and Activity Centre, Paisley.
- Denis McGrath, Nursing Officer, Ards Hospital, County Down.
- Michael Mackay McIntyre. For services to Yachting.
- Clare McKernan, District Manager, Northern Ireland Housing Executive.
- James Graham McKinney, Senior Business Adviser, North Yorkshire Development Commission.
- William Gibb McKinnon, Regional Catering Officer, Home Office.
- Robert McKnight, Area Maintenance Manager, Ayrshire and Arran Health Board.
- Benjamin McLean, Head of Department of Fabrication and Services Engineering, Telford College, Edinburgh.
- Mary Katherine McSorley, Chairman, Magherafelt District Council.
- Brenda Sharp McStravock, Ward Sister, Acute Male Medical and Geriatric, Southport and Formby District Health Authority:
- Keith Meikle-Janney, Chief Service Engineer; Manager, Product Support Rolls-Royce and Associates Ltd.
- George Watson Middleton, lately General Practitioner, Dyfed. For services to the community.
- Charles Keith Millman, General Dental Practitioner.
- Duncan Mills, Chairman, Loch Lomond Park Authority.
- Alexander Hugh Bruce Mitchell. For services to the housing construction industry in Scotland.
- Edna Mitchell, President, Family ContactLine, Altrincham.
- Janet Evelin Louise Moores. For services to Glyndebourne.
- Abraham Morgan, President, North Monmouthshire Society for Mentally Handicapped Children.
- Marilyn Morgan, Speech Therapist, Mid-Glamorgan Health Authority.
- Charles William Moxon, Owner, C.W. Moxon Ltd.
- Henry Farrow Mudd, Founder Director, Alpha Records. For services to English Church Music.
- William Muir, Principal Medical Laboratory Scientific Officer, Scottish National Blood Transfusion Service.
- Peter George Neeson, Divisional Officer, Fire Authority for Northern Ireland.
- Robert Bradshaw Neilly, lately Deputy Chairman, Equal Opportunities Commission for Northern Ireland.
- Mary Newland, Advisory Teacher, Primary Art and Design, Inner London Education Authority.
- Avril Gladys Newsam, General Practitioner, Edinburgh.
- Edward George Norman, Partner, The House of Darts. For services to Export.
- Kenneth Roy Norman, lately Sub-Commissioner of Pilotage and Chairman, District Pilotage Committee, Trinity House.
- Audrey Mary North. For political service.
- Thomas O'Neill, lately Superintendent Radiographer, Nottinghamshire Health Authority.
- James Ormerod, lately Collector, Higher Grade, Board of Inland Revenue.
- Henry Frederick Overy, Chairman of Trustees, Hospice-care Service, East Hertfordshire.
- Hazel Mary Paget, Secretary to the Chairman, The Electricity Council.
- Muriel Aileen Palmer. For services to the community in Swindon.
- Sybil Paterson. For services to The British Red Cross Society.
- Arthur Pattison, Inspector, Northumbria Police.
- Philip George Payne, lately Project Manager, Eastern Region, British Railways.
- Agnes Peet. For public service in Wigan.
- William David Pigott, lately Administrative Officer, Ministry of Defence.
- Roy Pizzey, Chief Inspector, Greater Manchester Police.
- Barbara Jane Porter. For political and public service.
- John Brian Vasey Porter, Chairman, Cumbria Committee for the Employment of Disabled People.
- Gordon Kenneth Preston, Chief Building Services Engineer, Newcastle City Council.
- Anthony Francis Price, Senior Executive Officer, Department of Employment.
- Major John Pritchard-Gordon. For political and public service.
- Thomas Ralston, Scientific Officer, National Engineering Laboratory.
- Neville Anthony Rendall, lately Research and Development Adviser, Shell UK Exploration and Production.
- Stanley David Rendell, Inspector (T), Board of Inland Revenue.
- Christopher John Rennard. For political service.
- Robert Frederick Ridgeon, Agricultural Economist, Cambridge University.
- Henry Roberts, lately Headteacher, Buckley County Primary School, Padeswood Road, Buckley, Clwyd.
- James Robinson. For services to Schools' Football.
- Joyce Hannah Robinson. For services to mentally disabled people in Cardiff.
- George William Robson, Senior Press Photographer, Ripon Gazette.
- Roland Herbert Rogers. For services to the community in Norfolk.
- David Rollo, Engineering Manager, Fields Aircraft Services Ltd.
- Norma Alexandra Ronald. For services to Her Majesty's Institution, Cornton Vale.
- John Vesey Roome, Senior Traffic Examiner, Department of Transport.
- Denis Rooney, lately Member, Northern Ireland Construction Industry Advisory Council.
- George Albert Rose, Field Support Engineer, Woodford, British Aerospace plc.
- Mary Teresa Edina Rose, Head Teacher, Troon County Primary School, Cornwall.
- Olga Rowe. For political and public service.
- David Keith Rowlands, Assistant Secretary, Wales, Territorial Auxiliary and Volunteer Reserve Association.
- Alexander Anderson Rubie, Member, Cunninghame District Council.
- Patricia Joan Ryan, Administrative Officer, Export Credits Guarantee Department.
- Graham Henry Salmon. For services to Sport for visually disabled people.
- Mary Caroline Vera Sansbury. For services to the community in Bristol.
- Gerald Edmund Saunders, Publisher, Draper's Record and Men's Wear, International Thomson Publishing Ltd.
- Desmond Percy Scarle, lately Assistant Treasurer, Revenue, Waveney District Council.
- Charlotte Ivy Scott-Dingle, lately Chairman, East Dorset Community Health Council; Vice-Chairman, League of Friends, Royal Victoria Hospital.
- Jean Sellars. For services to the community in Farnborough, Hampshire.
- Dennis Shepperd, Assistant Manager, Employee Relations, Devonport Management Ltd.
- Anna Simpson, Unit Personnel Officer, Psychiatric and Mental Handicap Unit, Tayside Health Board.
- Olive Mary Simpson, Typing Manager, Department of Social Security.
- John Stephen Skelton, Letter-cutter and Sculptor.
- Margaret Evelyn Slater. For political and public service.
- Joan May Smith, lately Higher Executive Officer, Advisory Conciliation and Arbitration Service.
- John Henry Williams Smith, Professional Officer, London and South East Region, Regional Advisory Council for Further Education.
- Royden James Carter Smith, lately Municipal Correspondent, Birmingham Evening Mail.
- William Todd Soutar, lately Director, Scottish and Northern Ireland Plumbing Employers' Federation.
- Alistair Caie Spence, Station Officer, Fire Prevention, Grampian Fire Brigade.
- Sylvia Audrey Spencer, Manager, Sumlock Calculating Services Ltd, Nottingham.
- Norman Spurr, Printing House Manager, West Yorkshire Police.
- David Raymon John Stagg, Amenity Verderer, Verderers Court, New Forest.
- Lilian Margaret Helen Stembridge, Caseworker, Royal Air Force Kinloss Branch, Soldiers', Sailors' and Airmen's Families Association.
- Frances Anne Stenhouse, lately Senior Executive Officer, Scottish Development Department.
- Donald George Stovey, lately General Manager, The Victory (Services) Association Ltd.
- Michael Strode. For services to Chailey Heritage, Handicapped Children's Pilgrimage Trust.
- Rosemary Ropner Stroyan. For services to disabled people.
- Robin Hugh Surgeoner. For services to Sport for disabled people.
- David Scott Sutherland, lately Senior Executive Officer, Employment Service, Department of Employment.
- Aurelio Aldo Joseph Tarquini, lately Catering Manager, BP Oil Ltd.
- Leonard Tasker, Founder Member, Coventry Enterprise Club. For services to disabled people in Coventry.
- Constance Jean Taylor, Headteacher, Pennyburn Primary School, Kilwinning.
- Frederick Charles Hector Taylor, Member, Panel of Flying Instructor Examiners, Civil Aviation Authority.
- Margaretha Anne Taylor, Foreign and Commonwealth Office.
- Arnold Watson Tomalin, lately Senior Information Officer, Agricultural and Food Research Council.
- Philip Michael John Tombleson, General Medical Practitioner; Chief Examiner, Royal College of General Practitioners.
- Nicola Pauline Marie Trahan, lately Health Visitor, Soldiers', Sailors' and Airmen's Families Association, SHAPE.
- John Broderick Tuckey. For services to the National Executive Council, Royal British Legion.
- Derek Frederick Thomas Tunn-Clarke, QPM. For services to the community in Reigate, Surrey.
- Ronald Charles Turner. For political and public service.
- Philip Bryn Vaile. For services to Yachting.
- Theodora Phoebe Wainwright, Vice-President, Surrey Branch, The British Red Cross Society.
- Charles Gordon Washington, Chairman, Eaves Brook Housing Association.
- Hugh Thomas Watkins, Administrator, Gwent Family Practitioner Committee.
- Margaret Elizabeth Watson, lately Nursing Sister, National Westminster Bank Residential Staff Training College.
- Rosemary Lilian Watt, Administrator, Architectural Heritage Fund.
- Cecilia Monica Waugh, Vice-Chairman, Kingston and Richmond, Family Practitioner Committee.
- William John Webb, Superintendent, Royal Ulster Constabulary.
- Peter Wheldon. For services to the Fruit Growing Industry.
- Michael John Whitcher. For political service.
- Monica Violet White. For services to The National Autistic Society.
- Robert Walter White, Senior Professional and Technology Officer, Ministry of Defence.
- Violet Gertrude Lilian White, Midwifery and Paediatric Service Manager and Director of Nursing Services, Harrow Health Authority.
- Rex Whitta, Head Ranger, Forestry Commission.
- William Ernest Wilkins, Member, Humberside County Council.
- Patricia Anne Williams. For political and public service.
- Josephine Joy Winnifrith, Deputy Chairman, South Eastern Electricity Consultative Council.
- Rodney John Winter, lately Chief Inspector, Sussex Police.
- John Barry Blake Wood, lately Chief Medical Laboratory Scientific Officer, Swindon Health Authority.
- Margaret Jean Woodfield. For political service.
- Muriel Pamela Woods, Export Services Manager, Chamberlain Phipps International Ltd. For services to Export.
- James Arthur Wright, Principal Administrative Officer, Department of Highways and Transportation, Cheshire County Council.
- William John Alan Wright, Chairman, Police Federation for Northern Ireland.
- Carroll William Wynne, Chairman, Belfast Charitable Society.
- Ann Hilary Allan, Commercial Officer, British Consulate-General, Montreal.
- The Reverend Father Gerard Augustine Avery. For services to the British community in North East Nigeria.
- Muriel Barron, Head of Passport Section, British Consulate-General, Düsseldorf.
- Timothy Benjamin. For services to road safety research in France.
- Ronald Ballantyne Blanche, Assistant Director of Audit, Hong Kong.
- Evelyn Lucy Brown. For welfare services to the British community in Santiago.
- Robert Kenneth Brown, Senior Assistant Commissioner, Royal Hong Kong Police Force.
- Denise Frances Farquharson Bryan. For services to Anglo-American educational cooperation.
- Charles James Kinloch Campbell. For welfare services to children in India.
- Alan John Carne, lately Third Secretary, HM Embassy, Havana.
- Alphonso Cassell. For services to musical entertainment in Montserrat.
- Chan Cheuk-sang, Staff Officer, Auxiliary Medical Services, Hong Kong.
- Janet Fulton Chubb. For welfare services to the community in Kenya.
- Morag Henderson Clark. For welfare services to children in Turkey.
- Brian Clissold. For services to English language teaching in North Yemen.
- John Richard David Cowell. For services to British ex-servicemen in Hamburg.
- Robert Wade Crowther. For services to the British community in Cyprus.
- Christopher Robin De Kretser. For services to British commercial and community interests in Kaduna, Nigeria.
- Edwin Ernest Garth, P.S.A. Clerk, HM Embassy, Bahrain.
- Marion Gentle. For services to medical training in Oman.
- The Reverend John Noel Keith Gibson. For services to education and the community in the British Virgin Islands.
- Norma Fay Grimshaw, Personal Assistant to HM Consul-General, Sydney.
- Hugh Palmer Haile, Head of Property Section, British High Commission, Nicosia.
- Dr Robert John Hart. For medical services to the community in Bangladesh.
- Hui Chun-Keung, CPM, JP. For community services in Hong Kong.
- Michael Robin Jackson. For services to Anglo-American relations in California.
- Mona Natalie Jackson, Clerk to the Executive Council, Cayman Islands.
- John Michael James. For welfare services to the community in Ethiopia.
- Adrian John Jenkyn. For services to British commercial and community interests in Tokyo.
- Derek Alexander Kingston, Senior Engineer, Fire Services Department, Hong Kong.
- Lee Sai-hei, Senior Superintendent, Urban Services Department, Hong Kong.
- Pamela Elizabeth McNeil. For welfare services to the community in Jamaica.
- Norman Mattin, Section Head, Operations Department, ICAC, Hong Kong.
- Victor Katsuro Mihara. For services to education and the community in Kobe, Japan.
- Margaret Munday, Personal Secretary, HM Embassy, Maputo.
- Ng Cho-yi, Chief Immigration Officer, Immigration Service, Hong Kong.
- Dr Robert Parsons. For welfare services to children in Sri Lanka.
- Eileen Platts. For nursing and welfare services to the community in India.
- Yvonne Jean Pollitt, Personal Assistant to the British High Commissioner, Dar es Salaam.
- Laura Adeline Mary Quartara, Registry Clerk, Administration Section, HM Embassy, Paris.
- Maureen Reed. For services to the British community in Brussels.
- Frances Salinie, Library and Books Officer, British Council, Paris.
- David James Simm. For services to electric power development in Bangladesh.
- Thomas Slater. For services to education in Madrid.
- The Reverend Dr Goodwin Campbell Smith, JP. For services to education and the community in Bermuda.
- Oswald Arthur Smith, Electricity Commissioner, Turks and Caicos Islands.
- Norman Richard Prescott Speed. For services to British commercial and community interests in Casablanca.
- Margaret Ruth Denholm Taylor. For services to the British community in Paris.
- Kenneth Thomas Wallace, DFC, Assistant Representative, British Council, Canada.
- Christine Mary Wallond, lately Personal Secretary to the Vice-President of the EC, Brussels.
- John Warder. For services to the British community in Ikeja, Nigeria.
- Doris Katherine Webb. For welfare services to the community in Karnataka State, India.
- Leonard Richard Williams. For services to British ex-servicemen in Switzerland.

=== Imperial Service Order (ISO) ===
Home Civil Service

- Audrey Beggs, Principal, Police Authority for Northern Ireland.
- Kenneth Frank Burns, Secretary, Queen's Award Office.
- James Alexander Donaldson, Principal, Department of Finance and Personnel, Northern Ireland.
- Douglas Duncan, Inspector (P), Board of Inland Revenue.
- George Barren Duncan, lately Grade II, HM Young Offenders' Institution, Polmont, Scottish Home and Health Department.
- Brian Stuart Everness, Chief Examiner, Board of Inland Revenue.
- William Gamble, Assistant Accountant General, Department of Education and Science.
- Graham George Goddard, lately Grade 7, Department of Social Security.
- Vincent James Green, Grade 7, Department of Health.
- John Hill Harding, lately Principal Professional and Technology Officer, Ministry of Defence.
- Alexander Eaton Hendry, lately Deputy Collector, Board of Customs and Excise.
- Henry Hunter, Principal, Department of Employment.
- Ronald Charles Lane, Principal Scientific Officer, Ministry of Defence.
- Leslie Brian Linley, Grade 7, Ministry of Agriculture, Fisheries and Food.
- Peter Henry Major, Principal, Department of Employment.
- Peter John McIntosh, Inspector (SP), Board of Inland Revenue.
- Gilbert Alfred Paul-Clark, Senior Chief Examiner, Department of Energy.
- Murdoch McLean Skelly, Senior Principal Scientific Officer, Ministry of Defence.
- John Hicklin Smith, Grade 6, Prison Service Industries and Farms, Home Office.
- Leslie Harold Stone, Grade 7, Department of the Environment.
- George William Thompson, Principal, Ministry of Defence.
- Stanley Varnam, Inspector (SP), Board of Inland Revenue.

Diplomatic Service and Overseas List

- Derek Hogan, Secretary, Examinations Authority, Hong Kong.
- Alexander Lamont Purves, JP, Director of Urban Services, Hong Kong.
- Michael John Smith, JP, Deputy Director of Government Supplies, Hong Kong.

=== British Empire Medal (BEM) ===
Military Division

Royal Navy

- Acting Charge Chief Weapon Engineering Artificer Stephen Paul Beard.
- Chief Wren Writer (P) Veronica Ann Bell.
- Chief Radio Supervisor Thomas David Booth.
- Master-at-Arms Desmond Briggs.
- Acting Chief Petty Officer Weapon Engineering Artificer Peter Derbyshire.
- Colour Sergeant Clive Ernest Evans, Royal Marines.
- Chief Petty Officer (Operations) (Missile) Colin Evans.
- Charge Chief Communications Technician Peter John Hosford.
- Chief Wren Quarters Assistant Margaret Theresa Ledingham-Fox.
- Chief Air Engineering Mechanic (WL) Nigel Edward Malcolm.
- Chief Petty Officer (Seaman) Kenneth John Peters.
- Bugler Alan John Piner, Royal Marines.
- Chief Petty Officer Writer Norman Graham Prior.
- Chief Medical Technician William Frederick Davies Sampson.
- Chief Petty Officer (Seaman) (Careers Service) Barry Leonard Stokes.
- Chief Wren (Degaussing) Heather Olwen Taylor, Women's Royal Naval Reserve.
- Charge Chief Communications Technician David Kenneth Frank Thomas.
- Acting Chief Petty Officer Physical Trainer Thomas Wallace.
- Chief Petty Officer Air Engineering Artificer (M) Raymond Eric Wedlake.
- Chief Petty Officer Electrician (Air) (Careers Service) Bruce Wisely.

Army

- Bombardier Robert John Adams, Royal Regiment of Artillery.
- Private Yvonne Edna Balment, Women's Royal Army Corps.
- Staff Sergeant Colin Arnold Bell, Royal Corps of Signals.
- Staff Sergeant William John Bogie, Royal Corps of Signals.
- Sergeant Malcolm Roy Bone, The Duke of Lancaster's Own Yeomanry, Territorial Army.
- Corporal David Columbus Hayter Brown, Royal Army Ordnance Corps.
- Staff Sergeant Richard John Burns, Royal Horse Artillery.
- Corporal Stuart Fraser Cameron, Corps of Royal Engineers, Territorial Army.
- Staff Sergeant George Ian Carr, The King's Own Scottish Borderers.
- Staff Sergeant Miu Kei Chan, Hong Kong Military Service Corps/Intelligence Corps.
- Corporal John Norman Chapman, Royal Corps of Signals.
- Corporal of Horse Ronald Clarke, The Life Guards.
- Sergeant Steven Robert Davies, Corps of Royal Engineers.
- Bombardier Stephen Dorkaine, Royal Regiment of Artillery.
- Sergeant Richard Martin Elias, The Queen's Royal Irish Hussars.
- Staff Sergeant William Edwin Frame, Officers Training Corps, Territorial Army.
- Staff Sergeant Kenneth Michael Gale, Corps of Royal Engineers.
- Staff Sergeant Kevin John Greenslade, Army Air Corps.
- Corporal Alan Greenwood, Royal Corps of Transport.
- Corporal Gilbert Terence Hague, Royal Pioneer Corps.
- Staff Sergeant David Michael Haines, Royal Army Medical Corps.
- Staff Sergeant Gordon Arthur Pake Hughes, Corps of Royal Engineers.
- Lance Corporal Michael John Jones, The Royal Regiment of Wales (24th/41st Foot).
- Sergeant Roy Jones, The Royal Regiment of Wales, (24th/41st Foot).
- Staff Sergeant Walter Stewart Farquharson Kennedy, Corps of Royal Engineers.
- Staff Sergeant Gordon George Laing, The Gordon Highlanders.
- Sergeant James Lavery, 1st The Queen's Dragoon Guards.
- Sergeant Colin Sydney Le Clercq, Army Catering Corps.
- Staff Sergeant Allan Michael Lillington, Royal Regiment of Artillery.
- Sergeant Stephen Harold Liversage, Welsh Guards.
- Staff Sergeant Philip Edward Lydon, The Cheshire Regiment.
- Sergeant Robert Mallon, The Royal Irish Rangers (27th (Inniskilling) 83rd and 87th).
- Corporal Gerard John McFadyen, Royal Army Ordnance Corps.
- Staff Sergeant James Anthony McGilloway, Royal Army Medical Corps, Territorial Army.
- Staff Sergeant Edward Mervyn Middleton, The Parachute Regiment.
- Staff Sergeant Jack Mileham, Royal Corps of Signals, Territorial Army.
- Corporal Terence Andrew Monery, 1st The Queen's Dragoon Guards.
- Staff Sergeant Christine Muir, Women's Royal Army Corps.
- Staff Sergeant Ole Anton Nelson-Girtchen, Army Catering Corps, Territorial Army.
- Sergeant Robert Charles Penfold, The Royal Hussars (Prince of Wales's Own).
- Staff Sergeant John William Phillips, Royal Corps of Transport.
- Sergeant Ian Geoffrey Pilling, Corps of Royal Electrical and Mechanical Engineers.
- Sergeant Neil Ward Porter, Royal Corps of Transport.
- Corporal Norman Pritchard, The Royal Welch Fusiliers, Territorial Army.
- Sergeant Rameshbahadur Gurung, 2nd King Edward VII's Own Gurkha Rifles (The Sirmoor Rifles).
- Sergeant Harry Richardson, The Light Infantry.
- Staff Sergeant Ian Solomon Roberts, The Royal Green Jackets.
- Staff Sergeant Tony Robinson, The Queen's Regiment.
- Sergeant Kenneth Bryan Rogerson, Royal Corps of Transport.
- Rifleman Rukman Gurung, 6th Queen Elizabeth's Own Gurkha Rifles.
- Staff Sergeant Douglas William Scott, Royal Corps of Signals.
- Private Maureen Sibert, Women's Royal Army Corps.
- Staff Sergeant Graham Thomas Smith, Corps of Royal Electrical and Mechanical Engineers.
- Sergeant John William Steven Smith, Army Catering Corps.
- Sergeant Peter Francis Smyth, Royal Corps of Signals, Territorial Army.
- Sergeant Bernard Neil Stainthorpe, Corps of Royal Engineers.
- Staff Sergeant Peter Still, Corps of Royal Electrical and Mechanical Engineers.
- Staff Sergeant Brian George Tanner, Royal Corps of Signals.
- Staff Sergeant Kenneth William Thomson, The Argyll and Sutherland Highlanders (Princess Louise's).
- Sergeant David John Townley, The Royal Green Jackets, Territorial Army.
- Corporal Raymond David Walker, Royal Tank Regiment.
- Corporal Patrick Webb, The Duke of Edinburgh's Royal Regiment (Berkshire and Wiltshire).
- Sergeant James William Wells, Royal Corps of Signals.
- Staff Sergeant David Michael Whitelock, Corps of Royal Electrical and Mechanical Engineers.
- Corporal Peter John Wilson, The Royal Regiment of Fusiliers.
- Sergeant Major George Winterbottom, The Royal Regiment of Fusiliers.

Royal Air Force

- Sergeant Ian Arundel.
- Flight Sergeant Anthony John Ashwood.
- Chief Technician Michael William Beales.
- Chief Technician Peter James Blei.
- Flight Sergeant Eric Bowden.
- Flight Sergeant Malcolm Sidney Browne.
- Flight Sergeant Peter John Robertson Brusby.
- Flight Sergeant Bruce Cain.
- Flight Sergeant Samuel William Joseph Chamberlain.
- Flight Sergeant Peter William Cook.
- Flight Sergeant Raymond Alfred Freestone.
- Flight Sergeant Peter Hagan.
- Flight Sergeant (now Warrant Officer) Edna Hilditch, Women's Royal Air Force.
- Flight Sergeant Terence John Holmes, RVM.
- Chief Technician Nicholas John James.
- Flight Sergeant Edward Vincent Lau, Royal Hong Kong Auxiliary Air Force.
- Corporal Ward Hugh Liddle.
- Flight Sergeant Victor William Bonnar McLaren.
- Corporal Arthur Edward Morrall.
- Chief Technician (now Flight Sergeant) Brian James Mulholland.
- Flight Sergeant Francis Eric Pender.
- Flight Sergeant James Joseph Romer.
- Sergeant Clifford Shepherdson.
- Flight Sergeant Thomas Martin Stein, RAF Regiment.
- Flight Sergeant Trevor Norman Welby.

Civil Division

- Robert Barry Adamson, Constable, Lancashire Constabulary.
- Bashir Ahmed, Arabic Typist and Translator, Foreign and Commonwealth Office.
- James Paton Allison, lately Station Warden, Royal Air Force Lossiemouth, Ministry of Defence.
- Leslie Gerald Allum, Foreman, Manor Farm, Grazeley, Reading.
- Thomas Kell Anderson, Security Officer, Foreign and Commonwealth Office.
- Sybil Joyce Louise Andrews, Observer (W), No 3 Group, Oxford, Royal Observer Corps.
- Frederick Arkwright, For services to the community in Wigan, Lancashire.
- Samuel James Armour, Constable, Royal Ulster Constabulary.
- Alma Bailey, Foster Mother, Mid-Glamorgan County Council Social Services Department.
- Eric Edward Baker, Senior Railman, London Midland Region, British Railways.
- Arthur Alan Barlow, For services to charity in Stoke-on-Trent, Staffordshire.
- James Barrie Barrie, Secretary and Treasurer Manchester Branch, Regimental Association.
- James Scott Bartlet, Sergeant, Grampian Police.
- Anthony Trevor Bastable, Manager, Families Shop, Blandford Camp, NAAFI, Dorset.
- Benjamin Louis William Battie, Master Class IV Harbour Service, Port of London Authority.
- Monica, Elizabeth Beck, For services to the Northern General Hospital League of Friends.
- Margaret Ann Beeston, For services to the community in Gateshead, Tyne and Wear.
- John Edward Berry, Fingerprint Officer, Hertfordshire Constabulary.
- Reginald Cecil Blissett, Senior Meter Inspector, West Midlands British Gas plc.
- Harold William Booker, Process and General Supervisory 'C', Ministry of Defence.
- Hilary Halden Bourne. For services to the community in Ditchling, Sussex.
- Joanna Leeson Bourne. For services to the community in Ditchling, Sussex.
- Reginald Kenneth Braddick. For sporting and charitable services to the City of Cardiff.
- Rosalind May Brain. For services to the community in Yarnton, Oxfordshire.
- Leslie Bramley, Day Foreman, Scunthorpe Works, General Steels Group, British Steel plc.
- Gudrun Brisbane, lately Housing Clerk, Soest Station, West Germany, Ministry of Defence.
- Peter James Brown, Forest Craftsman, Forestry Commission.
- Walter David Buckle, lately Truck Operator, Hythe Terminal, Esso.
- John James Burns, Sub-Officer, Fire Authority for Northern Ireland.
- Frank Evered Calvert, Gravure Printer, Coloroll Group plc.
- Donald Cameron. For services to the Glasgow Council on Alcohol.
- Robert Frederick John Cann. For services to folk music.
- Morley Eric Castle, Principal Engineer, Design Office, Marconi Space Systems Ltd.
- Emily Maud Catlin. For services to the community in Godstone, Surrey.
- Gordon Harold Cheer, Chargehand I, Engineering Services Branch, United Kingdom Atomic Energy Authority, Winfrith.
- Arthur Kay Clayton. For services to English Heritage.
- Arthur Frederick Clements, Senior Head Gardener, Commonwealth War Graves Commission.
- Lewis Leslie Newman Cobb. For services to the 250 (Halifax) Squadron Air Training Corps.
- Mary Coles. For services to the community in Melton Mowbray, Leicestershire.
- George Thomas Cox. For services to the community in Leeds.
- Norman Craven, Chargehand Fitter, Merseyside Transport Ltd.
- Keith Frederick Cripps, Works Manager, K.S. Paul Products Ltd.
- James Geoffrey Dallas, Foreman, Hiram Walker & Sons (Scotland) plc.
- Eric James Davies, Engineering Foreman, Merseyside and North Wales Electricity Board.
- Evan Bertie Davies, Storekeeper, Remploy Brynamman Factory.
- Thomas Trevor Dingle, Bridge Foreman, Cornwall County Council.
- Norman George Dodds, Permanent Way Section Supervisor, London Midland Region, British Railways.
- Hilda May Drew. For services to the Patients League King George Hospital.
- Andrew Alexander Duncan. For services to the community in Saltcoats, Ayrshire.
- Walter George Duncan, Foreman, John Wood Group plc.
- Aubrey Burton-Durham, Pilot, Sealink Harbours Ltd, Newhaven.
- Edna Mary Eatwell. For services to the National Spinal Injuries Centre, Stoke Mandeville Hospital.
- Stanley Egerton, Sergeant, Greater Manchester Police.
- Terence Raymond Eves, Chargehand Craftsman, Ministry of Defence.
- Thomas Alan Faulds. For services to the Auxiliary Coastguard Service, Isle of Whithorn, Wigtownshire.
- Dennis Fellows, Constable, Derbyshire Constabulary.
- Edward George Fenn, Caretaker, Chartered Institute of Management Accountants.
- Norman James Fergusson, Course Superintendent, Royal Troon Golf Club.
- Margaret Flint, Deputy Metropolitan Organiser, Manchester, Women's Royal Voluntary Service.
- Victor John Fordham, Constable, Metropolitan Police.
- David George Frankcom, Driver, Shell International.
- Evelyn Mary Fromhold, Member, Basildon, Women's Royal Voluntary Service.
- Michael Anthony Gaitens, lately Prison Officer Grade VI, HM Prison, Greenock.
- Allan William Gault, Sergeant, North Yorkshire Police.
- Hugh McClelland Gilmore, Sergeant, Royal Ulster Constabulary.
- Phyllis Gwendoline Golch. For voluntary services to the British Red Cross Society, Gloucester.
- John Samuel Goldsmith, Ganger, Omagh District Council.
- James Bernard Goodwin, Sub Officer, West Midlands Fire Service.
- Lawrence Gosling, Masonry Manager, Quibell and Son Ltd.
- Cyril Gracey, Mortician, Johnson and Company.
- Thomas Duffy Graham, Driver, Scottish Region, British Railways.
- Rita Green, Nursing Auxiliary, Hull Maternity Hospital.
- James Grierson, Shepherd, Slongaber, Dumfries.
- Donald Grigor, Driver, Ministry of Defence.
- Kathleen Hamer. For services to the Huddersfield Sea Cadet Corps Unit.
- Montague Hand, President, West Sussex Council of the Fire Services National Benevolent Fund.
- Peter Howell Handler, Site Superintendent, Victor Works, Lucas Aerospace.
- John Tolhurst Handover, Royal Automobile Club, Service Patrol.
- George Dennis Charles Handy, Bus Driver Powick Hospital, Worcester and District Health Authority.
- Samuel Hanna, Head Porter, Belfast City Hospital.
- Winifred Stuart Hardie. For services to the Edinburgh Branch, Parkinson's Disease Society.
- George William Harrison. For services to the welfare of ex-Servicemen and women.
- Roger Ernest Hayes, Vice President, Island of Jersey Band.
- Evelyn Diane Hewson, Supervisor, Office and Print Services, The Chartered Institute of Building.
- Annie Hodson, lately Chief Reprographics Officer, Ministry of Defence.
- Richard Alan Hoile, Constable, Devon and Cornwall Constabulary.
- Frank Homer, Leading Hand, Stainless Steel Division, British Steel plc.
- Dorothy Winifred Hood, Meals-on-Wheels Organiser, Penarth, Women's Royal Voluntary Service.
- William Hopper. For services to the Royal British Legion, Scarborough.
- John Edward Housley, Foreman, Nottingham Royal Ordnance plc.
- Kenneth Howarth, Sewing Machinist, Woodfield Industries Sheltered Workshop.
- Emrys Hughes, Forest Craftsman, Forestry Commission, Wales.
- Raymond John Frederick Iles, lately Process and General Supervisory 'C', Ministry of Defence.
- Annie Jackson. For services to the community in Bolton, Lancashire.
- Alan Lawrence Jeffreys, Constable, Lothians and Borders Police.
- George Kenneth Jeffs, lately Coxswain Assistant Mechanic, Barmouth Lifeboat, Royal National Lifeboat Institution.
- Derek Edward Charles Johns, Joiner, Ministry of Defence.
- John Johnston, Prison Officer, Northern Ireland Prison Service.
- Cyril Rhys Jones, Prison Officer Grade IV, HM Prison, Brixton.
- Glyn Jones, lately Prison Officer Grade IV, HM Youth Custody Centre, Portland.
- Idris Jones, Skilled Turner, Ministry of Defence.
- Margaret Ann Jones, Auxiliary Postwoman, Swansea Head Office, The Post Office.
- William Oswald Jones, Caretaker, Ysgol Mair Primary School, Rhyl, Clwyd.
- William Jordan, Security Guard, Department of Economic Development, Northern Ireland.
- Christopher Laurence Joyce, Detective Constable, West Midlands Police.
- Jacqueline Nellie Keen, lately School Crossing Patrol, Manchester City Council.
- Francis Patrick Kelly, Constable, Merseyside Police.
- John James Kennedy, Senior Traffic Warden, Police Authority for Northern Ireland.
- Ronald John Kennedy, Driver, Eastern Region, British Railways.
- Mona Kirby, Chief Reprographics Officer, Department of Trade and Industry.
- William Jess Knox, Manager, Auchinleck Talbot Junior Football Club.
- David Henry Lawther, Senior Driver, South Eastern Education and Library Board.
- George Legg, lately Truck Operator, Avonmouth Terminal, Esso.
- Brian Leonard, Field Support Engineer, Basildon General Electric Company Sensors Ltd.
- Claude Lewis. For services to cricket.
- Edward Liddle, Constable, Sussex Police.
- Sidney Charles Williamson Longstaffe. For services to animal welfare, Newcastle upon Tyne.
- George Robert Lower, Inspector of Works, Brian Colquhoun and Partners.
- Michael Lyons, Constable, Hampshire Constabulary.
- Hugh Alexander Mackenzie. For services to the community in Achateny, Argyllshire.
- James Angus Maclean, School Crossing Attendant Newtonmore, Inverness-shire.
- Wilson Ronald Maddocks, Constable, Kent Constabulary.
- Thomas Swanston Maltman, Harbour Master, Eyemouth, Berwickshire.
- Victor Albert Charles Marsh, Coxswain Mechanic, Swanage Lifeboat, Royal National Lifeboat Institution.
- Audrey Marshall, Constable, Humberside Police.
- Edward Younger Marshall. For services to Edenhall Hospital, Musselburgh.
- William Dawson Marston, Chief Warder, National Gallery.
- Leslie Maw. For services to music and the community of Kirkbymoorside, York.
- James McCafferty. For services to music in Livingston, West Lothian.
- Albert James Daniel McCall, Senior Engineering Foreman, London Electricity Board.
- Arthur McCallion, Forestry Supervisor, Department of Agriculture, Northern Ireland.
- Hugh McClymont, Attendant Lightkeeper, Northern Lighthouse Board.
- Barbara McDonald, lately County Food Organiser, East Sussex, Women's Royal Voluntary Service.
- William Campbell McIlroy, Supervisor, Michelin Tyre plc.
- George McKee. For services to the Royal National Institute for the Blind.
- Hazlett Campbell McKeown, Constable, Royal Ulster Constabulary.
- Norah McKever, Government Telephonist, Board of Customs and Excise.
- Doris Ivy McQueen, Emergency Services, Devon, Women's Royal Voluntary Service.
- James Alexander Graham McSporran. For services to the community in Gigha, Argyll.
- Shirley Victoria Miles. For services to swimming in the Isle of Wight.
- James Michael Millar. For services to the St Andrew's Ambulance Corps in Fife.
- Catherine Miller, Controlling Supervisor, Department of Social Security.
- Geoffrey Ronald Mills, Superintendent AB Machine Shop Dynamics Division, British Aerospace plc.
- Rosalie Ann Mitchell, Leading Reprographics Operator, Ministry of Defence.
- Irene Gwendoline Moon. For services to the Friends of Maida Vale Hospital.
- Michael William Morrel, Constable, Nottinghamshire Constabulary.
- Kenneth George Moxham, Chargehand Carpenter, Ministry of Defence.
- William Edward Denis Oliver, Driver, Government Car Service, Department of the Environment.
- Malcolm Howe Padley. For services to the Peak Park Joint Planning Board.
- Fernley Edgar Palmer, Senior Storekeeper, Ministry of Defence.
- Ralph Stanley Partner, Prison Officer Grade VIII (Trades Officer) HM Prison, Standford Hill.
- Christabel Patterson. For services to the community in Maryport, Cumbria.
- Elsa Mary Pearce. For services to the League of Remembrance.
- Colin John Pidduck, lately Special Services Officer, South Western British Gas plc.
- Arthur Ralph Pointer, lately Senior Gatekeeper, Bank of England.
- Sidney Charles Pomeroy, Administrative Assistant, Cleansing Department, Corporation of London.
- George David Pope. For services to the Campbeltown Sea Cadet Corps Unit.
- Maurice Powell, Chargehand, Metropolitan Police.
- Mary Price. For services to the community in Ammanford, Dyfed.
- Ronald William Price, Chargehand Instrument Mechanic, Risley Laboratory, United Kingdom Atomic Energy Authority.
- Kathleen Christiana Prickett. For musical services to the Queen Elizabeth Military Hospital, Woolwich.
- Gwendoline May Prout. For services to disabled people in Exeter, Devon.
- Emmeline Mary Pugh, lately Head of Print Room, Medical Research Council.
- Leslie Alfred Quantrill, lately Postman, Albury, Guildford, The Post Office.
- Selwyn John Reece, Heavy Goods Vehicle Class I Driver, Bassett Group of Companies.
- William Frederick Thomas Ribbons. For services to Association Football in Norwich.
- Dennis Percival Roach. For services to swimming in Wales.
- Jacqueline Mary Roberts. For services to the Weston Super Mare Sea Cadet Corps Unit.
- Thomas James Roberts, Agricultural Training Board Instructor, Sheep Handling Skills.
- Alfred Robinson. For services to the community in East Halton, South Humberside.
- John Barrie Robinson, Station Officer, West Yorkshire Fire Service.
- John Martin Rodgers, Public Relation Officer, St John Ambulance Brigade.
- Jeanne Irene Rolfe, Foster Mother, Avon, Somerset County Council.
- Bertram Reginald Rooke, Senior Head Gardener, Commonwealth War Graves Commission.
- Herbert Rose. For services to the 2527 (Lawnswood) Squadron Air Training Corps.
- Horace Sankey, Grade 1 Underground Fitter, Donisthorpe and Rawdon Colliery, Central Area, British Coal.
- Gertrude Nancy Sawyer, Personal Assistant, Coal Trade Benevolent Association.
- Violet May Scott, Cap Spinner, Joseph Horsfall and Sons Ltd.
- Elizabeth Short, Head Receptionist and Telephonist, Institute of Mechanical Engineers.
- Anne Simpson, Quality Control Manageress, Lismona Wear Ltd.
- William John Sisley, Postman, Guildford Letter District Office, The Post Office.
- Frederick William Smart, lately for services to the Coventry Branch, Soldiers' Sailors' and Airmen's Families Association.
- Harriet Smith. For services to the blind in Wales.
- Peter Dent Smith, Observer Crew 1, No 9 Group, Dorset Royal Observer Corps.
- Martin Trevor Smithurst, Senior Shop Steward, Electrical Electronic Telecommunication and Plumbing Union, Anglesey Aluminium Metals Ltd.
- Michael Spear, Experimental Worker I, Ministry of Defence.
- Harold William Charles Standing, Bus Driver, Alder Valley South Ltd.
- Doris Stearn, School Crossing Patrol, Cambridgeshire County Council.
- Michael Wilfred Steel, Water Controller, Southern Water Authority.
- Kenneth James Stenner, Divisional Superintendent, Avon St John Ambulance Brigade.
- Kenneth Stephens, Service Technician, North Western British Gas plc.
- Raymond Stevenson, Chief Carver, Jaycee Furniture (Brighton) Ltd. for services to export.
- John Cameron Stoddart, Chargehand Craftsman, Ministry of Defence.
- William Richard Stonebridge, Foreman, Central Repair Depot, Gloucestershire County Council.
- John Richard Stuart, Prison Officer, Grade VIII, HM Prison, Peterhead.
- May Talbot. For services to the community in Horton Kirby, Kent.
- Judith Selina Taylor. For services to the Guide Dogs for the Blind Association in Derbyshire.
- Raymond Daniel Teft, Station Officer HM Coastguard Department of Transport.
- Horace Reginald Thelwell, Voluntary Motorcycle Training Instructor, Wirral.
- Julia Louisa Kate Thurston, Member, Wallington, Women's Royal Voluntary Service.
- Major Ben Howard Tinton. For services to the Woolwich (The Royal Anglian Regiment) Military Hospital.
- Breidge Gertrude Treanor, Matron, Mitchell House Special School, Belfast.
- William Thomas Tucker, lately Centre Leader, Fallingbostel, West Germany Young Women's Christian Association.
- Frederick Thomas Turner, Chargehand Maintenance Engineer, Royal Marsden Hospital.
- Kenneth John Vine, Supervisor, Grouting and Anchors, Cementation Piling and Foundations Ltd.
- Gerald Newman Viney. For voluntary services to the community in Hulme.
- Michael Wade, lately Supervising Usher IV, Lord Chancellor's Department.
- Peter Walden, Insurance Secretary, Lancing Scout Association.
- Harry Walker. For services to the St Ninian's Old Folk's Association, Stirling.
- Mavis Noreen Wallbank. For services to the community in Denby, Derby.
- Irene Ward-Thompson, Branch Secretary, Durham Branch, The British Red Cross Society.
- Christopher John Warren, Constable, Metropolitan Police.
- Eric Warrington, lately District Adviser, Catering, Macclesfield Health Authority.
- Pamela Margaret Wasylyk, Chief Paperkeeper, Department of Trade and Industry.
- John Edward Waters, Driver, London Midland Region, British Railways.
- Peter West, Instructional Officer I, HM Prison, Ashwell.
- George Westle, lately Support Manager III, Lord Chancellor's Department.
- Stanley Hubert Cecil Weston, Postman, North West London Letter District Office, The Post Office.
- Effie Marjorie Whitehead, Centre Organiser and Branch Industrial Training Officer Humberside Branch, The British Red Cross Society.
- Gordon Whittaker. For services to the Salford Division Soldiers', Sailors' and Airmen's Families Association.
- James Copland Whyte, Building Inspector, Scottish Special Housing Association.
- Anthony Ernest David Williams. For services to the No 1148 (Penarth) Squadron Air Training Corps.
- Peter Edward Williams, Painting Foreman, West Midlands British Gas plc.
- Vivian Frank Llewellyn Williams, Prison Officer Grade V, HM Prison, Littlehey.
- Frederick John Williamson, lately Worcester City Centre Organiser, Hereford and Worcester Branch, The British Red Cross Society.
- Jack Wilmington, Museum Warder V, HM Tower of London.
- Doreen Wilson, Examinations Secretary, The Chartered Institution of Building Services Engineering.
- Harry Hunter Wilson, Sub Officer, Cumbria Fire Service.
- John McArthy Wolfe, Milk Roundsman, Unigate Dairies.
- Beryl Margaret Wright, Technical Assistant, Anglian Water Authority, Norwich.

Overseas Territories

- Jimmy Fung Yuen Sum, Gatechecker, Public Works Department, Hong Kong.
- Alma Jean Harding, Registrar, Safe Care Registry, Government Secretariat, Hong Kong.
- Ho Ping-chiu, Chief Supervisor, Auxiliary Medical Services, Hong Kong.
- Lau Wing-kan, Chief Customs Officer, Customs and Excise Service, Hong Kong.
- Lee Kam-lun, Senior Clerical Officer, Island Regional Headquarters, Hong Kong.
- Lee Tim-sang, Senior Inspector, Regional Transport Inspectorate, Hong Kong.
- Ma Chung, Supervisory Foreman, Housing Department, Hong Kong.
- Joseph Ng Mau-fai, Manager, Linen Production Unit, Medical and Health Department, Hong Kong.
- Lola O'Hoy, Personal Secretary Grade 1, Industry Department, Hong Kong.
- Julio Pons. For community services in Gibraltar.
- Tse Kwok-fu, Controller, Civil Aid Services Band, Hong Kong.

=== Royal Red Cross ===
==== Member of the Royal Red Cross (RRC) ====
- Lieutenant Colonel Carolyn Margaret Ayers, Queen Alexandra's Royal Army Nursing Corps.
- Lieutenant Colonel Hilary Stephanie Dixon-Nuttall, ARRC, Queen Alexandra's Royal Army Nursing Corps.
- Colonel Jill Margaret Field, ARRC, Queen Alexandra's Royal Army Nursing Corps.

==== Associate of the Royal Red Cross (ARRC) ====
- Superintending Nursing Officer Anne Patricia Gaughan, Queen Alexandra's Royal Naval Nursing Service.
- Senior Nursing Officer Kathryn McCarthy, Queen Alexandra's Royal Naval Nursing Service.
- Major Tessa Ann Broughton, Queen Alexandra's Royal Army Nursing Corps.
- Major Patricia Anne Friend, Queen Alexandra's Royal Army Nursing Corps, Territorial Army.
- Staff Sergeant Derek Alfred George, Royal Army Medical Corps.
- Squadron Leader Rosalie Ann Reid, Princess Mary's Royal Air Force Nursing Service.

=== Air Force Cross (AFC) ===
Royal Navy

- Lieutenant Commander Andrew Campbell Thomson Tait.

Royal Air Force

- Squadron Leader Stephen Calton.
- Flight Lieutenant Raymond St George Carpenter.
- Squadron Leader Paul Sydney Dlxon.
- Wing Commander (now Group Captain) Ian Michael Stewart.
- Squadron Leader Frederick Ian Welch.

=== Air Force Medal (AFM) ===
- Staff Sergeant Robert John Oddie, Army Air Corps.

=== Queen's Police Medal ===
England and Wales

- Anthony John Beck, Constable, Norfolk Constabulary.
- John Stuart Bennion, Deputy Chief Constable, Hertfordshire Constabulary.
- Frederick Bloor, lately Chief Superintendent, Staffordshire Police.
- Michael Charles Cronin, lately Chief Superintendent, Dyfed-Powys Police.
- Henri Harman Exton, Sergeant, Greater Manchester Police.
- Alan Grahame Fry, Commander, Metropolitan Police.
- Ronald Hadfield, Chief Constable, Nottinghamshire Constabulary.
- Eric Denwood Humphrey, Commander, Metropolitan Police.
- Terence Arthur Louis Lambert, Chief Superintendent, Suffolk Constabulary.
- Jeremy John Plowman, Commander, Metropolitan Police.
- Francis Frederick Read, Chief Inspector, Thames Valley Police.
- James Sharples, Deputy Chief Constable, Merseyside Police.
- Donald Shaw, Assistant Chief Constable, West Yorkshire Police.
- Cenydd Golyddan Price Thomas, Chief Superintendent, South Wales Constabulary.
- Peter David Topping, lately Detective Chief Superintendent, Greater Manchester Police.
- John Arthur Weselby, Deputy Chief Constable, Derbyshire Constabulary.
- Frederick Thomas Wilson, Assistant Chief Constable, Durham Constabulary.
- Alan William Young, lately Deputy Assistant Commissioner, Metropolitan Police.

Northern Ireland

- Noel George Boone, Sergeant, Royal Ulster Constabulary.
- Cecil Scott, Superintendent, Royal Ulster Constabulary.

Hong Kong

- William Chan Kang-po, Chief Superintendent, Royal Hong Kong Auxiliary Police Force.
- Lee Lam-chuen, CPM, Assistant Commissioner, Royal Hong Kong Police Force.

Gibraltar

- Joseph Louis Canepa, Commissioner of Police, Gibraltar.

Scotland

- George Albert Esson, Deputy Chief Constable, Grampian Police.
- John Harling Martindale, Chief Superintendent, Strathclyde Police.
- John Archibald MacLean, Sergeant, Northern Constabulary.

=== Queen's Fire Service Medal for Distinguished Service ===
England and Wales

- Ronald Jenkins, Divisional Officer III, Cheshire Fire Brigade.
- Terence William Malpass, Chief Officer, Durham County Fire Brigade.
- John Robert Pearson, Chief Officer, Hampshire Fire Service.
- John Weddell, Deputy Chief Officer, Northumberland Fire and Rescue Service.
- James Henry Windsor, Chief Officer, West Glamorgan Fire Brigade.

Cayman Islands

- Kirkland Hencliffe Nixon, MBE, Chief Fire Officer, Cayman Islands.

Hong Kong

- Woo Kwan-kuen, CPM, Chief Fire Officer, Hong Kong Fire Services.

=== Colonial Police and Fire Service Medal ===
- Chan Tit-kin, Senior Superintendent, Royal Hong Kong Police Force.
- Cheung Fook-leung, Superintendent, Royal Hong Kong Police Force.
- Justin Cunningham, Senior Superintendent, Royal Hong Kong Police Force.
- Donald Ellis Griffiths, Senior Superintendent, Royal Hong Kong Police Force.
- Hsu King-ping, Senior Divisional Officer, Hong Kong Fire Services.
- Ian Frank Lacy-Smith, Senior Superintendent, Royal Hong Kong Police Force.
- Leung Koon-tung, Principal Fireman, Hong Kong Fire Services.
- Leung Kwong-ling, Principal Fireman, Hong Kong Fire Services.
- Leung Pak-shing, Station Sergeant, Royal Hong Kong Police Force.
- Li Tung, Chief Inspector, Royal Hong Kong Police Force.
- Lip Chung-wai, Station Sergeant, Royal Hong Kong Police Force.
- Dennis Leslie Shackleton, Senior Superintendent, Royal Hong Kong Police Force.
- Robert Thomas Sullivan, Chief Inspector, Royal Hong Kong Police Force.
- Peter James Thompson, Senior Superintendent, Royal Hong Kong Police Force.
- Thomas Thomson, Senior Superintendent, Royal Hong Kong Police Force.
- Matthew Vincent Walsh, Senior Superintendent, Royal Hong Kong Police Force.
- Yuen Kam-chi, Principal Fireman, Hong Kong Fire Services.

=== Queen's Commendation for Valuable Service in the Air ===
Royal Navy

- Lieutenant Commander John Beattie.

Army

- Warrant Officer Class I James Stephen Lawton, Army Air Corps.

Royal Air Force

- Master Aircrew Francis Hugh Graham.
- Squadron Leader Kenneth Robert McCallum.
- Squadron Leader Graham Douglas Magee.
- Squadron Leader Michael James Metcalf.
- Squadron Leader Eric George Norbury.
- Flight Lieutenant David John Parker.
- Wing Commander (now Group Captain) Brian Edward Allen Pegnall.
- Squadron Leader Alan Potter.
- Flight Lieutenant (now Squadron Leader) John Richards Potter.
- Squadron Leader Timothy Raymond Watts.
- Flight Lieutenant Eric Alexander Wealleans.

United Kingdom

- Laurence James Buist, Managing Pilot of British Aerospace 146 Fleet, Dan-Air Services, Gatwick Airport.
- Keith Hill Chadbourn, lately Senior Test Pilot, Westland Helicopters Ltd.
- Anthony John Hawkes, Senior Experimental Test Pilot, Manchester, British Aerospace plc.

== Australia ==
=== Knight Bachelor ===
State of Queensland

- Robert Henry Norman, O.B.E. For services to the community.

=== Order of the Bath ===
==== Companion of the Order of the Bath (CB) ====
Civil Division

State of Queensland

- Wallis James Baker. For public service.

=== Order of Saint Michael and Saint George ===
==== Companion of the Order of St Michael and St George (CMG) ====
State of Queensland

- Patrick Desmond Rowley. For services to the dairying industry.

=== Order of the British Empire ===
==== Commander of the Order of the British Empire (CBE) ====
Civil Division

State of Queensland

- Hugh David Sawrey. For services to Art.

State of Tasmania

- Lloyd John Harris. For services to the community.

==== Officer of the Order of the British Empire (OBE) ====
Civil Division

State of Queensland

- Raymond George Hope. For services to the community.
- Jack Owen Manton. For services to the arts.
- Dr. Thomas Julian Murphy. For services to the community.
- Keith Henry McDonald. For services to the press and to the community.

State of Tasmania

- Kenneth Francis Lowrie. For services to the community.

==== Member of the Order of the British Empire (MBE) ====
Civil Division

State of Queensland

- Dr. William Derek Domville Cooke. For services to medicine.
- Gladys Marie Elliott. For services to the community.
- Barry Leslie Ferber. For services to the community.
- Desmond Terence Foster. For services to golf.
- Dr. Pamela Mary Jackson. For services to the community.
- Arthur Neil Lewis. For services to audiology.
- Daphne Mary Pirie. For services to sport.
- Robert Ian Templeton. For services to sport.

State of Tasmania

- Peter Doyle. For services to the community.
- Thomas Arthur Gardner. For services to the community.

=== Companion of the Imperial Service Order (ISO) ===
State of Tasmania

- June Marjorie Smith. For public service.

=== British Empire Medal (BEM) ===
Civil Division

State of Queensland

- Myra Rose Blanch. For services to the community.
- William Brace. For services to the community.
- Hazel Culverhouse. For services to the community.
- Stanley Brian Dorey. For services to the community.
- Wendy Elizabeth Giddens. For services to World Expo 88.
- Eric Merton Johnston. For services to the dairying industry.
- Myra Ruby Jones. For services to the community.
- Merle Kate Kelly. For services to the community.
- Neville Kirk. For services to the cattle breeding industry.
- Kathleen Maria McCart. For services to the community.
- Edward John Graham Owens. For services to the blind.
- Leslie Anderton Tait. For services to the community.
- Brian Alfred Wendt. For services to World Expo 88.

State of Tasmania

- Shena Campbell Bewglass. For services to nursing.
- Jeffery Molesworth Boyes. For services to yachting.
- Harold Wilson. For services to lifesaving.

=== Queen's Fire Services Medal (QFSM) ===
State of Queensland

- Victor Matthew Horne, Chief Officer, Maroochy Fire Brigade Board.

== Cook Islands ==
=== Order of the British Empire ===
==== Officer of the Order of the British Empire (OBE) ====
Civil Division

- Tinomana Napa Ariki. For services to the community.

=== Queen's Police Medal (QPM) ===
- Tepure Tapaitau, Commissioner of Police, Cook Islands Police.

== Mauritius ==
=== Knight Bachelor ===
- Adrien Pierre Dalais. For services to trade and industry.
- Victor Joseph Patrick Glover, Chief Justice of Mauritius.

=== Order of the British Empire ===
==== Commander of the Order of the British Empire (CBE) ====
Civil Division

- Jean Maurice Roger Jullienne. For services to trade and industry.
- Michael Beniot Arouff. For services to industry.

==== Officer of the Order of the British Empire (OBE) ====
Civil Division

- Ismael Ahmad Randera. For services to sport and the community.

==== Member of the Order of the British Empire (MBE) ====
Civil Division

- Marie Monique Lenette. For services to the community.
- Abdool Latiff Hussenbocus. For public service.
- Khemraj Ramdeehul. For services to the community.
- Ginette Cabon. For public service.
- Cyril Payen. For public service.
- Juguth Prukash Torul. For public service.
- Jeanne Marie Denise Dorasamy Naiken. For public service.

=== Mauritius Police Medal (MPM) ===
- Louis Serge Barry Autard. Superintendent of Police.
- Guy Andre Hervel. Police Sergeant.
- Heetulrow Anundrow. Police Constable.
- Sandragassen Murday. Police Constable.

== The Bahamas ==
=== Order of the British Empire ===
==== Commander of the Order of the British Empire (CBE) ====
Civil Division

- The Reverend Edwin Llewellyn Taylor. For services to the community.

==== Officer of the Order of the British Empire (OBE) ====
Civil Division

- Robert Ivan Bartlett. For public service.
- Marjorie Winton Theresa Davis. For services to the community.
- Dr. Cleveland Wilmore Eneas. For services to the community
- Vylma B Thompson Curling. For Public Service

==== Member of the Order of the British Empire (MBE) ====
Civil Division

- Viola Elizabeth Sweeting Butler. For services to nursing.
- Dr. Ira Earl Farrington. For services to medicine.
- Audrey Vernice Symonette. For public service.

=== British Empire Medal (BEM) ===
Civil Division

- Gloria Evans Bain. For services to the community.
- Kathleen Strachan Hepburn. For public service.
- Fredericka Maud Cambridge Knowles. For services to nursing.
- The Reverend Simeon Simms. For services to the community.

== Grenada ==
=== Order of the British Empire ===
==== Officer of the Order of the British Empire (OBE) ====
Civil Division

- Seon Gregory Augustus Alexander. For public service.

==== Member of the Order of the British Empire (MBE) ====
Civil Division

- Agnes Gladys Ivy Archer. For services to the Girl Guides.
- Herman Brian Peters. For services to disabled people.
- Egerton Milford Addison Welsh. For public service.

=== British Empire Medal (BEM) ===
Civil Division

- Barnabas Compton. For services to boat building.
- Rupert Hinds. For public service.
- Abraham James. For services to farming.

== Papua New Guinea ==
=== Knight Bachelor ===
- Dr. James Edward Jacobi, OBE. For services to medicine and the community.
- Joseph Karl Nombri, ISO, BEM. For public service.

=== Order of Saint Michael and Saint George ===
==== Companion of the Order of St Michael and St George (CMG) ====
- The Honourable Akoka Doi, MP. For Political and Community services.
- The Honourable Karl Stack, MP. For public service.

=== Order of the British Empire ===
==== Commander of the Order of the British Empire (CBE) ====
Civil Division

- The Honourable Kagul Koroka, MPA. For public and community service.
- Auwo Ketauwo. For services to the community.

==== Officer of the Order of the British Empire (OBE) ====
Civil Division

- Peter Barter. For services to commerce and tourism.
- Peter Norman Colton. For public service.
- James Frederick Haddon Cook. For services to the community.
- Richard Haddon Dunbar-Reid. For services to the plantation industry and the community.
- The Honourable William Echorn, MPA. For public and community service.
- Bishop Gagoa Gaigo. For services to religion and the community.
- Roger Hau'Ofa. For public and community service.
- Michael Manning. For public and community service.

==== Member of the Order of the British Empire (MBE) ====
Military Division

- Chief Warrant Officer Pius Londron, (83642). For service to the Papua New Guinea Defence Force.
- Warrant Officer Gabriel Magoipen, (82605). For service to the Papua New Guinea Defence Force.

Civil Division

- Brian John Aitken. For public service.
- Sister Helen Kassam. For services to health and the community.
- Sergeant-Major Bill Iso Livinai. For service to the Royal Papua New Guinea Constabulary.
- Kope Angalu Mamando. For services to the community.
- Johnson Mantu. For public service.
- Turiai Mara Vila. For public service.
- Sergeant-Major Aso'o Maure, BEM. For service to the Royal Papua New Guinea Constabulary.
- Chief Inspector Martin Pentumari. For services to the Royal Papua New Guinea Constabulary.
- Jenny Reto. For services to health and the community.
- Inspector Kalu Soto. For service to the Papua New Guinea Correctional Services.

=== Companion of the Imperial Service Order (ISO) ===
- Andrew Ignatius Temu. For public service.

=== British Empire Medal (BEM) ===
Military Division

- Sergeant Thomas Balun, (82629). For service to the Papua New Guinea Defence Force.
- Warrant Officer Jack Eki, (82641). For service to the Papua New Guinea Defence Force.
- Sergeant Vaguma Towowoda, (84686). For service to the Papua New Guinea Defence Force.

Civil Division

- Paglipari Amblinai. For public service.
- Pastor Hamura Esosa. For services to religion and the community.
- Joshis Ferea. For services to education and the community.
- Oripa Garua. For services to religion and the community.
- Koveki Iakili. For services to health and the community.
- Jack Joses. For services to education and the community.
- Correctional Warrant Officer Sharp Ki Makip. For services to the Papua New Guinea Correctional Services.
- Dinna Niangi. For services to women's affairs.

=== Queen's Police Medal (QPM) ===
- Toami Kulunga, Superintendent, Royal Papua New Guinea Police Force.
- Susantha Douglas Perera Ranmuthugala, Superintendent, Royal Papua New Guinea Police Force.

== Solomon Islands ==
=== Order of the British Empire ===
==== Officer of the Order of the British Empire (OBE) ====
Civil Division

- Thomas Ko Chan. For services to the community.

==== Member of the Order of the British Empire (MBE) ====
Civil Division

- Gertrude Blum. For services to the community.

=== British Empire Medal (BEM) ===
Civil Division

- Jackson Koria. For services to the community.
- Joseph Kama. For services to the community.
- Timothy Koni. For services to the community.
- Michael Dao. For public service.

== Saint Vincent and The Grenadines ==
=== Order of the British Empire ===
==== Commander of the Order of the British Empire (CBE) ====
Civil Division

- Noel Edgar Venner, OBE. For public service.

==== Officer of the Order of the British Empire (OBE) ====
Civil Division

- Richard Walter Joachim. For public service.

==== Member of the Order of the British Empire (MBE) ====
Civil Division

- Edson Alexander Bowman. For public service.
- Yvonne Christiana Elaine Francis-Gibson. For public service.

== Belize ==
=== Order of the British Empire ===
==== Officer of the Order of the British Empire (OBE) ====
Civil Division

- Paul Albert Mahung. For services to education and the community.
- Sonia Alberta Tiabo. For public service.

==== Member of the Order of the British Empire (MBE) ====
Civil Division

- Raymond Grandville Lashley. For services to sport.

== Antigua and Barbuda ==
=== Order of the British Empire ===
==== Officer of the Order of the British Empire (OBE) ====
Civil Division

- Henson Arthur Barnes. For public service.

=== Queen's Police Medal (QPM) ===
- Clement McWilton Dunnah, CPM, Superintendent, Royal Antigua and Barbuda Police Force.
- Rupert Vestin Montgomery Charles, Superintendent, Royal Antigua and Barbuda Police Force.

=== Queen's Fire Services Medal (QFSM) ===
- Malcolm Alphonso Nicholas, Assistant Commissioner, Royal Antigua and Barbuda Police Force.
- George Belphester Thomas, Superintendent, Royal Antigua and Barbuda Police Force.

== Saint Christopher and Nevis ==
=== Order of the British Empire ===
==== Officer of the Order of the British Empire (OBE) ====
Civil Division

- Alfred Lawrence Lam. For services to the community.
