= Edward Hooper =

Edward, Ed or Ted Hooper may refer to:

- Ed Hooper (politician) (born 1947), Florida politician
- Ed Hooper (journalist) (born 1964), American journalist
- Edward W. Hooper (1839–1901), Union soldier
- Edward Hooper (MP), British lawyer and politician
- Edward Hooper (born 1951), UK writer on Oral polio vaccine AIDS hypothesis
- Ted Hooper (1918–2010), British beekeeper
- Ted Hooper (rugby league) (1871–1925), Australian rugby league referee and administrator

== See also ==
- Hooper (surname)
