= Charles Stroud =

Charles Stroud may refer to:

- Charles Eric Stroud (1924–2005), Welsh paediatrician and professor
- Charles C. Stroud (1870–1949), American football, basketball, and baseball coach
