= James Allan (diplomat) =

British diplomat

James Nicholas Allan CMG CBE (22 May 1932 – 18 September 2018) was a British diplomat, High Commissioner in Mauritius (1981–1985) and ambassador to Mozambique (1986–1989).

== Early life ==
The son of Morris Edward Allan and Joan Bach, and a half-brother of William Bach, Baron Bach, Allan was educated at Gresham's School, Holt, Norfolk, from 1946 to 1950, the Mons Officer Cadet School from 1950 to 1951, and the London School of Economics from 1953 to 1956. On 1 September 1951, he was commissioned into the Royal Army Service Corps in the National Service list.

== Career ==
From 1956 to 1958: Allan was an Assistant Principal in the Commonwealth Relations Office, in Westminster. In 1958 he became a Third Secretary and later a Second Secretary at the British High Commission in South Africa. In 1959 he was appointed as Private Secretary to the Parliamentary Under-Secretary. From 1961 to 1964 he was posted as First Secretary to the British High Commission in Sierra Leone, then briefly transferred to the British High Commission to Cyprus before joining the Commonwealth Relations Office at the Foreign and Commonwealth Office, where he served until 1968. On 20 July 1966, he was appointed as an Officer of Her Majesty's Diplomatic Service.

From 1969 to 1971, Allan was Head of Chancery at the British Embassy in China. On 24 September 1971, he was appointed as Consul in Luxembourg. From 1973 until 1975, he was Counsellor in the Northern Ireland Office, Belfast. He next returned to the Foreign and Commonwealth Office as a Counsellor and in 1978 was promoted to Head of the Overseas Information Department there.

Following the Lancaster House Agreement, from December 1979 to March 1980 Allan served on the Governor's Staff in Salisbury, Rhodesia. He returned to the Foreign and Commonwealth Office as Head of its Overseas Information Department.

In 1981–1985, Allan was High Commissioner in Mauritius and simultaneously Ambassador to the Comoro Islands; from 1986 to 1989 he was posted as British Ambassador to Mozambique.

Following his retirement from the Diplomatic Service, from 1989 to 1992 Allan joined the Senior Directing Staff at the Royal College of Defence Studies.

== Personal life ==
In 1961, Allan married Helena Susara Crouse. They had one son, Nick, and one daughter, Sarah. Mrs Allan died in 2001.

He was a member of the Athenaeum Club, London.

== Honours ==
- Commander of the Order of the British Empire, 1976 New Year Honours
- Companion of the Order of St Michael and St George, 1989 New Year Honours
