= David Alliance, Baron Alliance =

British businessman and politician (1932–2025)

The Right Honourable The Lord Alliance CBE

Member of the House of Lords
- Lord Temporal
- Life peerage 1 July 2004 – 21 March 2025

Personal details
- Born: Davoud Alliance; 15 June 1932 Kashan, Persia
- Died: 18 July 2025 (aged 93)
- Party: Liberal Democrats
- Spouses: Alma Joseph; Homa Alliance (m. 1982)
- Children: 3
- Relatives: Nigel Alliance OBE
- Occupation: Non-Executive Chairman, N Brown Group
- Net worth: ▲£500 million (2018)

David Alliance, Baron Alliance, CBE (Persian: داوود آلیانس, Hebrew: דייוויד אליאנס; 15 June 1932 – 18 July 2025) was an Iranian businessman and Liberal Democrat politician.

== Early life ==
David (originally Davoud) Alliance was born in Kashan, Iran, to a Jewish family and was educated at the Etahad School, Iran. He began his career in the bazaars of Iran at the age of fourteen and, by the age of eighteen, moved to Manchester, England.

== Honours ==
Alliance was appointed a Commander of the Order of the British Empire (CBE) in the 1984 New Year Honours and in the 1989 New Year Honours received a knighthood, the honour being bestowed 9 February 1989. He was created a life peer as Baron Alliance, of Manchester in the County of Greater Manchester, on 1 July 2004, and sat on the Liberal Democrat benches until his retirement on 21 March 2025.

== Career ==
Alliance owned 33% and was chairman of N Brown Group plc, a clothing catalogue retailer. He was also the joint founder with Sir Harry Djanogly of Coats Viyella plc (now Coats Group plc), operating in 67 countries with 22% global market share, employing 70,000 people. Share sales, a valuable art collection and some small private firms account for the remainder of the family fortune. Alliance and Djanogly turned Coats Viyella into a £2 billion textile business. Alliance was also one of the primary investors of the web measurement company SimilarWeb.

Lord Alliance served on several committees, including the Prince's Youth Business Trust, Council for Industry and Higher Education, and the University of Manchester Foundation, and the Weizmann Institute. He was a senior trustee of the Next Century Foundation. He served on the Board of Governors of Tel Aviv University in Israel.

Lord Alliance held a Doctorate of Science at Heriot-Watt University and a Legum Doctor (Doctor of Laws Honoris Causa) from the University of Manchester. He was once an Honorary Fellow of UMIST as there was no UMIST anymore after the merger.

Alliance received an Honorary Doctorate from Heriot-Watt University in 1991.

Between 1984 and 1991, Lord Alliance was instrumental in the rescue of the Ethiopian Jews out of Sudan and Ethiopia by bringing them to Israel.

== Wealth ==
In the Sunday Times Rich List 2015 ranking of the wealthiest people in the UK, Alliance was placed with an estimated fortune of £3.1 billion. After his elevation to the peerage in 2004, he gave the Liberal Democrats £668,872 in donations, plus an additional £20,996.56 in notional interest on loans he has made to the party.

Alliance owned a home in Didsbury, Manchester and a mock-Georgian mansion in St John's Wood, an affluent area of northwest London. He also owned a collection of Lowry paintings.

In 2012, Tel Aviv University established an Iranian Studies Centre, named after Lord Alliance.

In September 2015, Manchester Business School was renamed in Alliance Manchester Business School (AMBS) in honour of Alliance, which has had a long-standing association with the school and wider university. AMBS's head, Fiona Devine, said, "The donation made by Lord Alliance and the Alliance Family Foundation will support the biggest transformation the school has seen since it was established some 50 years ago."

== Autobiography ==
Alliance's autobiography, A Bazaar Life (co-written with Ivan Fallon), was published in 2015.

== Personal life and death ==
Alliance had three children and eight grandchildren and split his time between Manchester and London.

He died on 18 July 2025, at the age of 93.

== Arms ==
Coat of arms of David Alliance, Baron Alliance
Crest A pomegranate tree Or leaved Vert fructed of five Or seeded Gules and tied about the trunk with a bow party lengthwise Vert and Gules. Escutcheon Argent on a pale Gules between four pallets, the outer Vert, the inner Gules interlaced with eight barrulets Vert a shuttle Or tipped and spooled Argent. Supporters On either side, a Persian lion Gules winged langued armed tail tufted and gorged with a plain collar attached thereto a chain reflexed over the back Or. Badge A Persian lion sejant Gules winged langued armed tail tufted and gorged with a plain collar attached thereto a chain reflexed over the back Or.
