= N Brown Group =

British home shopping retailer

N Brown Group plc

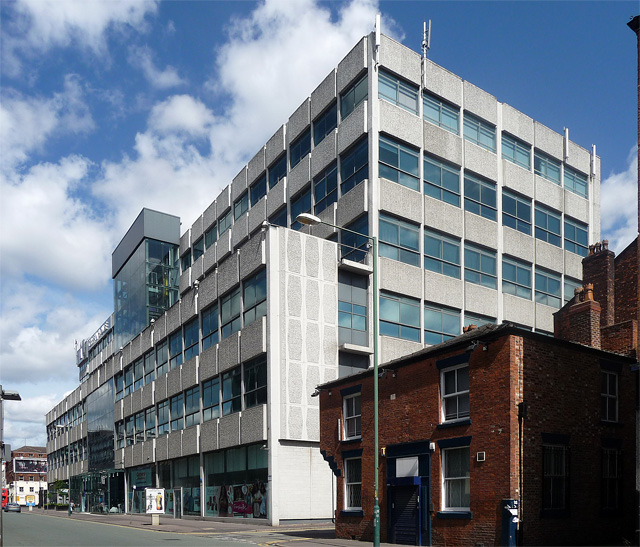
- Headquarters, Manchester
- Type: Public
- Traded as: LSE: BWNG
- ISIN: GB00B1P6ZR11
- Founded: 1859; 167 years ago
- Headquarters: Manchester, England
- Key people: Ron McMillan (Chairman); Steve Johnson (CEO)
- Revenue: ▼£400.6 million (2024)
- Operating income: ▲£26.9 million (2024)
- Net income: ▲£0.8 million (2024)
- Parent: Alliance family
- Website: www.nbrown.co.uk

N Brown Group plc (LSE: BWNG) is an online retailer headquartered in Manchester, England. N Brown offers a range of products, predominantly clothing, footwear and homewares with a focus on underserved customer groups. The company was listed on the London Stock Exchange until it was taken private by the Alliance family in February 2025.

== History ==
The oldest company within the group - JD Williams & Company Ltd - was founded by James David Williams in 1859 when he started in business operating three mobile shops. In 1882, he took advantage of the introduction of UK's parcel post service, to send his company's products direct to his customers. In 1907, JD Williams instructed architect R Argile to build Langley Buildings in a baroque style on Dale Street in Manchester's Northern Quarter: this building still stands today.

In 1963, All Williams' family shares were bought by Cooper-Taymil Ltd (a subsidiary of Alliance Brothers Ltd. owned by Lord (David) Alliance CBE and Nigel Alliance OBE) and placed in a holding company, N Brown Investments, (founded by Nathan Brown in 1964 and acquired by David Alliance in 1968). In 1970, N Brown Group acquired JD Williams shares along with mail-order catalogues Ambrose Wilson and Oxendales.

In 1986, N Brown Investments acquired the JD Williams group in a reverse takeover, enabling the company to obtain a public listing. The company name was changed to N Brown Group plc.

In 2004, the business moved to new premises on Lever Street in Manchester's Northern Quarter.

The company bought online underwear retailer Figleaves for £11.5 million in 2010.

Lord Alliance stepped down as chairman in 2012 with Andrew Higginson joining that September.

In 2014, N Brown outsourced 550 contact centre roles to Serco. That year it also issued two profit warnings within six months.

Angela Spindler joined as Chief Executive in 2013, succeeding Alan White, who had been in the top job since 2002.

In 2017, shares fell by as much as 9pc when N Brown announced it was facing a £40m hit after finding issues with a credit insurance product it sold to customers between 2006 and 2014, responding to a crackdown by the Financial Conduct Authority.

In 2018, Matt Davies was announced as the new chairman of N Brown Group.

In 2020, N Brown took a range of actions to retain cash after sales fell by 40%. It established a £50 million three-year lending facility under the Coronavirus Large Business Interruption Loan Scheme supported by borrowers. It also broadened curtained covenants in its existing £125 million unsecured revolving credit facility in anticipation of the half-year test date of August 2020.

Following the COVID-19 pandemic and subsequent lock down, the company suffered a sharp decline in revenue in March 2020 and then, in August 2020, suspended its dividend for the financial year ending in February 2021.

The company confirmed in October 2024 that it would be taken private by the Alliance family. The transaction was completed on 12 February 2025.

== Brands ==
In 1999, Simply Be was launched to cater for women aged 25 – 45 in sizes 12 - 32 and has been a vocal champion of size inclusivity.

In 2007, Jacamo was launched, catering for 25 - 45-year-old men of all body shapes, from small to 5XL. Former cricketer Freddie Flintoff was recently a key brand ambassador.

In 2018, JD Williams rebranded to become JD Williams: The Life Store, positioning the brand as a modern online department store for the 45 – 60-year-old woman.

== Stores ==
Simply Be, Jacamo and High & Mighty operated bricks & mortar stores throughout the UK until 2018. The company announced it was closing five loss-making stores in 2017 and, after announcing, in June 2018, that it was proposing to close all bricks and mortar stores, the company had completely implemented that decision by August 2018.

== Charity ==
In September 2017, N Brown donated £50,000 to the Royal Manchester Children's Hospital following the Manchester Arena bombing.

== Locations ==
The business has its operational Head Office in Manchester's Northern Quarter and has warehousing and distribution centres in Oldham, in Greater Manchester, and Glossop in Derbyshire.
