= Ramsey Cottage Hospital =

Hospital on the Isle of Man

Coordinates: 54.32894307°N 4.39004367°W

Ramsey Cottage Hospital is a small hospital in Ramsey, Isle of Man.

Before the establishment of the Manx Health Service in 1948 it was a voluntary hospital. Medical care was provided, apart from specialist services, by the local general practitioners and paid for by a beddage fund. At that time it had a modern and well-equipped operating theatre and in the year to October 1947, 203 operations were performed.

There was a Maternity Home in Ramsey, in Brookhill Road, which closed in 1947.
