= Ted Hooper (rugby league) =

Australian rugby league referee and administrator

Edward James Hooper (1871 – 22 August 1925) was an Australian rugby league referee and administrator. Born in Kent, England, Hooper played rugby union in Sydney before becoming a referee in the sport. When the New South Wales Rugby League (NSWRL) formed in 1908, marking the start of professional rugby league in Australia, he joined the ranks of players and referees who switched to the new code, becoming the president of its referees' association. He officiated the match between Eastern Suburbs and Newtown in the first round of the NSWRL's inaugural season. He died in 1925, collapsing in the dressing rooms after refereeing an exhibition match in Brisbane.
