= Brittle Bone Society =

British health charity

- Formation: 1968
- Registration no.: 272100
- Purpose: Medical research, patient support
- Headquarters: Dundee, Scotland
- Founder: Dr. Margaret Grant
- Chief Executive: Patricia Osborne
- Website: https://www.brittlebone.org

The Brittle Bone Society is a UK wide charity that provides support to people affected by osteogenesis Imperfecta (OI).

== Background ==
The Brittle Bone Society was established in 1968 in Dundee by Margaret Grant, who has OI. When she was young, Grant was aware that there was virtually no support for people with OI and that many medical professionals knew little or nothing about the condition. When her daughter Yvonne was born some years later, very little had changed. For many years Grant was the driving force of the society, which was recognised when she was awarded an MBE in 1989 and in 2018 when she was awarded an honorary degree from the University of Dundee.

The society now has more than 1,000 members and works closely with specialist medical units and other professionals throughout the UK.

The CEO is Patricia Osborne who has been working with the charity since 2009

The society's archives, which include about thirty boxes of material, are held by the University of Dundee.
