= David H.H. Metcalfe =

Professor David Henry Harold Metcalfe
- Occupation: Professor of General Practice University of Manchester
- Known for: Contributions to Medical Education, medical records, General Practice
- Title: Professor

David Henry Harold Metcalfe, OBE, MB, B.CHIR, FRCGP, Professor of General Practice the University of Manchester.

Metcalfe attended Leys School, Cambridge and the Cambridge University. He held a commission in the Royal Tank regiment and later became a general practitioner in 1958. He was Assistant Professor in Family Medicine at the University of Rochester, New York from 1970 to 1972. He was appointed Senior Lecturer in General Practice in the Department of Community Health at the University of Nottingham Medical School later moving to University of Manchester as Professor of General Practice. He was an active member and was elected a fellow of the Royal College of General Practitioners. He served on the Council from 1973 to 1978 and was on the General Purposes Committee in 1973. He has published widely on teaching family medicine in the United States, and on the influence and responsibilities of medical bodies and government medical education and training in the UK., Computers in general practice, innovations in medical records in the UK and applicability of transferring skills to other settings. He has delivered many endowed lectures including the William Pickles lecture entitled “The Crucible” in 1986.
