= Charles Eric Stroud =

British paediatrician (1924–2005)

Sir (Charles) Eric Stroud
- Born: Charles Eric Stroud; 15 May 1924; Splott, Cardiff, Wales
- Died: 29 December 2005 (aged 81)
- Education: Cardiff High School; Welsh National School of Medicine
- Occupation: Paediatrician
- Known for: Professor of Child Health at King's College School of Medicine and Dentistry; Development of paediatric services at King's College Hospital
- Medical career
- Profession: Physician
- Field: Paediatrics
- Institutions: King's College Hospital; Great Ormond Street Hospital; Makerere University
- Sub-specialties: Child health; paediatric blood diseases; children's liver disease
- Awards: Knight Bachelor (1989)

Sir (Charles) Eric Stroud (15 May 1924 – 29 December 2005) was a Welsh-born British paediatrician and Professor of Child Health, King's College School of Medicine and Dentistry.

== Early life and career ==
Stroud was born in Splott, Cardiff, on 15 May 1924. His father Frank was a draughtsman and worked with disabled children; his mother Lavinia was a seamstress. His grandfather Charles was an ambulance driver.

Stroud was educated at Cardiff High School and the Welsh National School of Medicine. He trained at Church Valley Hospital in the Rhondda, and after National Service, started specialising in paediatrics. He worked at Great Ormond Street Hospital and at Makerere University, Uganda.

From 1962, Stroud worked at Kings College Hospital, where he became Professor in 1968. He presided over the replacement of the Belgrave Hospital for Children by the modern Variety Club Children's Hospital at King's. His other achievements included setting up specialist clinics for paediatric blood diseases and a children's liver unit.

== Charitable work ==
Stroud worked with the Variety Club and the Lyras Foundation to raise funds for paediatric care, and helped set up the Well Child charity and the British Paediatric Surveillance Unit.

== Later life ==
After retirement, Professor Stroud was made Hans Sloane International Fellow at the Royal College of Physicians of London . He was made a Knight Bachelor in the 1989 New Year Honours.

== Personal life ==
Stroud married his physiotherapist wife June in 1950: they had three children, Diana, Amanda and David. Lady Stroud died on 21 February 2015.
