= Alfred Joseph Shepperd =

British industrialist

Sir Alfred Joseph Shepperd
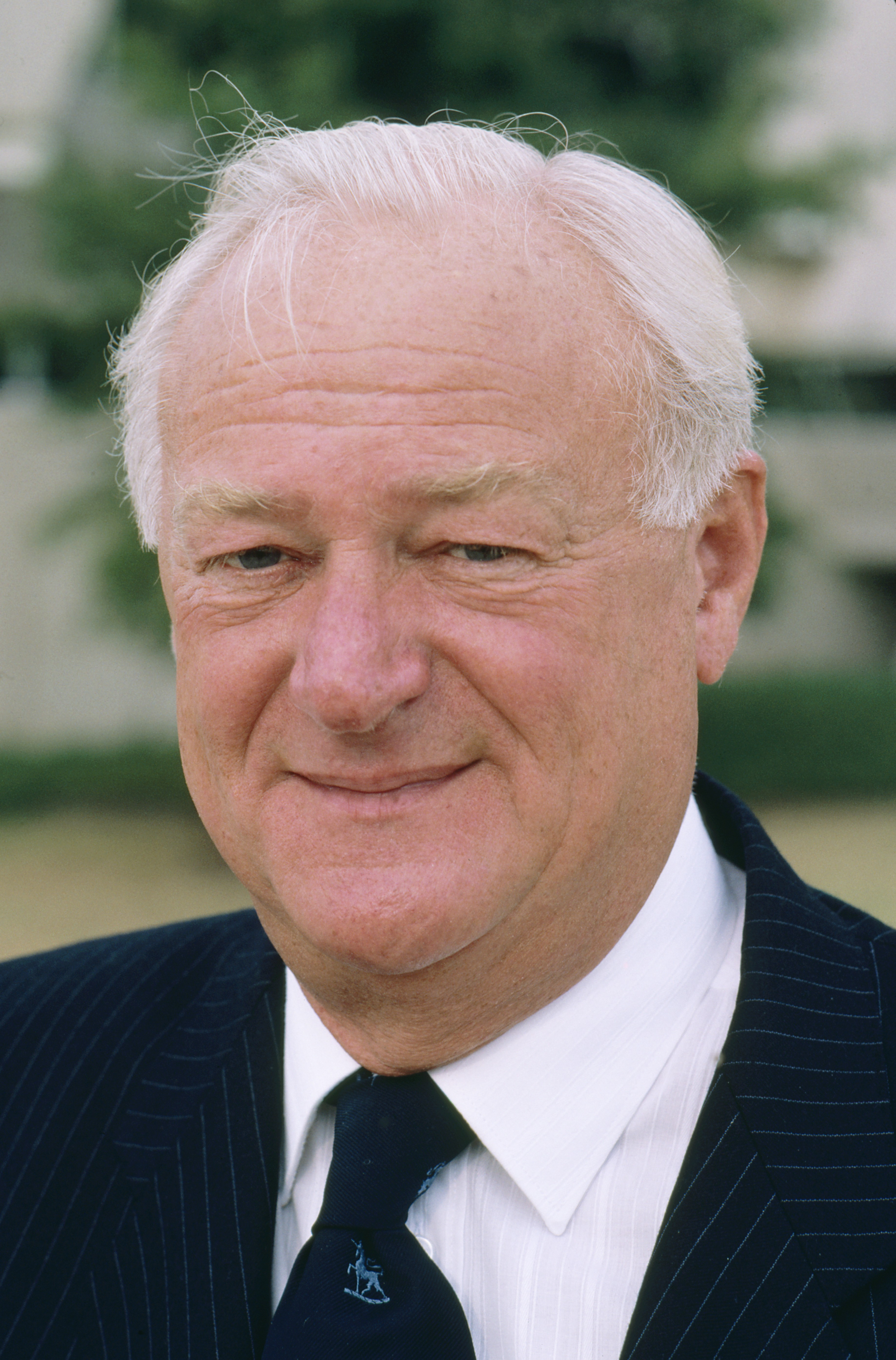
- Born: 19 June 1925
- Died: 15 October 2007

Sir Alfred Joseph Shepperd (19 June 1925 – 15 October 2007) was a British industrialist.

== Early life and education ==
Alfred Joseph Shepperd was born on 19 June 1925, in London. His father was Alfred Charles Shepperd (1898–1939), a printer. His mother was Mary Ann (née Williams; 1896–1975), a milliner.

Shepperd attended the Archbishop Tenison's School, served in the Fleet Air Arm of the Royal Navy, and received a degree in economics from the University College London.

== Career ==
From 1949 to 1963, Shepperd worked at the Rank Organisation.

From 1963 to 1965, Shepperd worked at Selincourt & Sons.

From 1965 to 1967, Shepperd worked at the Chamberlain Group.

From 1967 to 1972, Shepperd was the managing director of Keyser Ullmann Industries.

From 1972 to 1977, Shepperd was the finance director of the Wellcome Foundation.

From 1977 to 1990, Shepperd was the chairman of the Wellcome Foundation.

From 1986 to 1990, Shepperd was the chairman of the Burroughs Wellcome Company.

From 1986 to 1990, Shepperd was the controversial chairman and chief executive of Wellcome plc.

After he retired, Shepperd was a trustee at the National Institute of Economic and Social Research for ten years.

== Personal life ==
In 1950, Shepperd married Gabrielle Bouloux.

In 1989, Shepperd was knighted by Elizabeth II.
