= Ted Hooper =

British bee keeper and author

Ted Hooper MBE NDB (21 September 1918 – 19 March 2010) was a British bee keeper and author of Guide to Bees & Honey (1976, fourth edition 1997). The book is a standard text recommended by the British Beekeepers' Association (BBKA) as part of the BBKA exam syllabus. He also co-authored The Illustrated Encyclopedia of Beekeeping (Roger Morse and Ted Hooper, 1985).

Hooper was born at Colyton, Devon and later lived in Essex, where he worked for Writtle Agricultural College. He held a National Diploma in Beekeeping. Hooper died in March 2010, aged 91.
