= History of the Jews in Denver =

The history of the Jews in Denver, Colorado extends from the discovery of gold in 1858 to the present day. Early Jewish pioneers were largely of German backgrounds and deeply involved in politics and local affairs, and some were among the most prominent citizens of the time. Beginning in the 1880s, the influx of Jewish immigrants to the United States from Eastern Europe expanded the Denver Jewish community and exposed cultural rifts between Jews from German-speaking versus Yiddish-speaking backgrounds. As Denver became a center for those seeking tuberculosis treatment, Jews were among those who came seeking healing, and the Jewish community set up two important organizations that aided not only sick Jews but also the sick poor of all backgrounds. In the early 20th century, the Orthodox community in the city's West Side attracted religious new immigrants and built up a number of communal institutions. The community, especially the poor in the West Side, had to deal with antisemitism—sometimes violent—and the rise of the Ku Klux Klan in Colorado. Beginning in the 1950s and continuing through the 1970s, the community started to spread from the West Side to the East Side and then to the suburbs. The community remains vibrant today, and as it has rapidly grown in the past decades so have the number of educational, recreational, and religious organizations and institutions that serve it.

== Early history ==
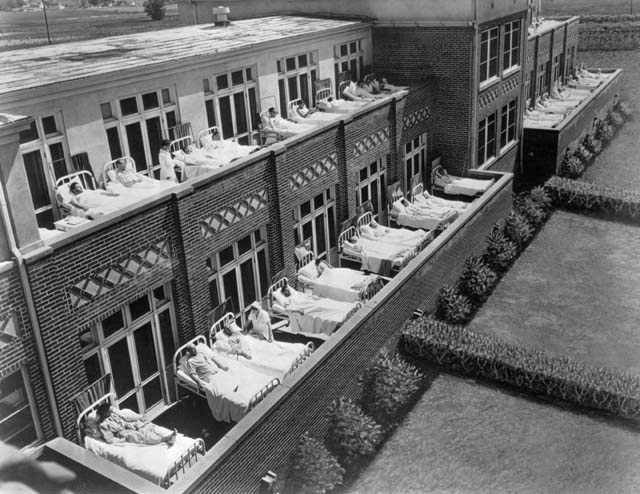
Tuberculosis patients on the porch at the Jewish Consumptives' Relief Society (JCRS) sanatorium in Denver.

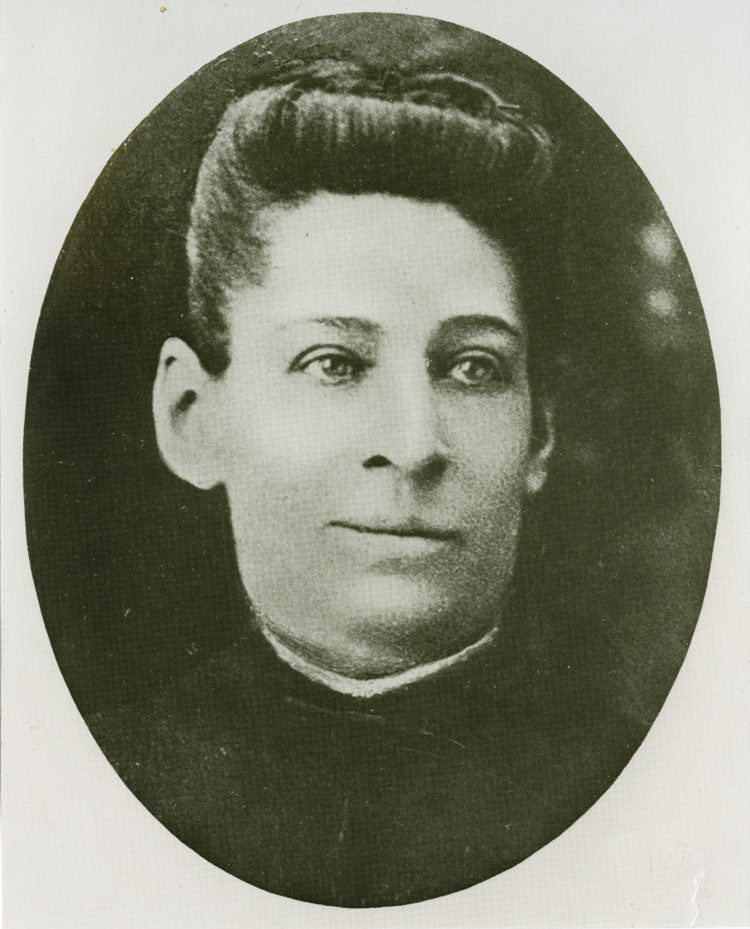
Frances Wisebart Jacobs

By the year after the discovery of gold, 1859, there were about a dozen Jews in Denver, mostly from German or Central European backgrounds. Among them were four men—Hyman and Fred Salomon, Leopold Mayer, and Abraham Jacobs—who would go on to serve on the Denver City Council. They are also thought to have held the first religious service of any kind in Denver, in September 1859. In 1860, the first Jewish organization, the Hebrew Burial and Prayer Society, was formed. A B'nai B'rith lodge was started in 1872, and Colorado's first synagogue, Temple Emanuel, was established in 1874. In 1889, Wolfe Londoner became the city's first (and thus far, only) Jewish mayor, although his tenure was short as he had to step down over corruption charges.

The wave of Eastern European Jewish immigrants to the U.S. that began in the 1880s, largely from Imperial Russia, changed the makeup of the Denver Jewish community. The first Jews to come to Denver and establish the community were largely Reform Jews of German backgrounds, and some had significant financial means. The new Jewish immigrants, however, were more traditional and Orthodox, spoke Yiddish, and were poor. At this time, Colorado was also starting to gain notoriety as "The World's Sanitarium", a significant destination for those wanting to cure their tuberculosis (also known then as consumption). A number of Jews, especially recent immigrants, were in this category, along with an estimated one third of the state, and arrived in hopes that the drier, sunnier climate would help their illness. To meet the needs of this growing segment of Jews and the rest of Denver's community that was sick and poor, the National Jewish Hospital for Consumptives (NJH) (established in 1899), today known as National Jewish Health, and the Jewish Consumptives' Relief Society (JCRS) (established in 1904) were formed. A rivalry and tension existed between the two organizations, in many ways mirroring the broader conflict between German and Eastern European Jews in Denver. While both were free, the NHS, which was founded by the German Jewish community, had strict admissions criteria. These included that the illness was in an earlier stage, that the patient could prove they had sufficient funds to remain in the city or purchase a return ticket home after discharge, and that the maximum stay at the facilities was limited to six months. These requirements, combined with a feeling that they were being condescended to or were unwelcome, made National Jewish appear infeasible to some Eastern European Jews, creating a sizable need that the Jewish Consumptives Relief Society was created to fill.

Key in the formation of the city's charitable organizations, Jewish and otherwise, was Frances Wisebart Jacobs. She was instrumental in the founding of both the National Jewish Hospital and the community chest, which would later become United Way, and her tireless work on behalf of people in need earned her a tribute in the stained glass of the Colorado capitol rotunda, one of 16 pioneers and the only woman depicted.

Following a failed attempt to build a Jewish agriculture-based colony in Cotopaxi, Colorado, by a group of Orthodox families who had immigrated from the Russian Empire and HIAS, Denver's West Colfax neighborhood and West Side became home to a considerable Jewish population. In 1887, the former colonists helped to found the neighborhood's first synagogue, Congregation Zera Abraham, which remains an active Orthodox synagogue today.

== 20th century ==
At the turn of the 20th century, the Orthodox community in the West Side was continuously expanding by establishing synagogues, mikva’ot, educational institutions, and Yiddish theater. A number of prominent Yiddish writers and Jewish intellectuals came to Denver to treat their tuberculosis, such as the poet Yehoash. Between 1900 and 1907, many Jewish immigrants moved directly to Denver due to its burgeoning religious community, and Jewish settlement in the city reached its peak just prior to World War I. Bolstered by the number of tuberculosis patients, the Jewish population of the city reached 15,000 in 1912. In 1913, the Intermountain Jewish News was founded, which today is the largest Jewish paper in Colorado.

After running away from home as a teenager, future Israeli Prime Minister Golda Meir lived in the West Side of Denver from 1913 to 1914 with her sister, who had moved to the city due to her tuberculosis. It was in Denver that Golda met her future husband, Morris Meyerson (Myerson), and in her autobiography, My Life, she wrote "to the extent that my own future convictions were shaped and given form, and ideas were discarded or accepted by me while I was growing up, those talk-filled nights in Denver played a considerable role." The home she lived in with her sister is now preserved as the Golda Meir House Museum.

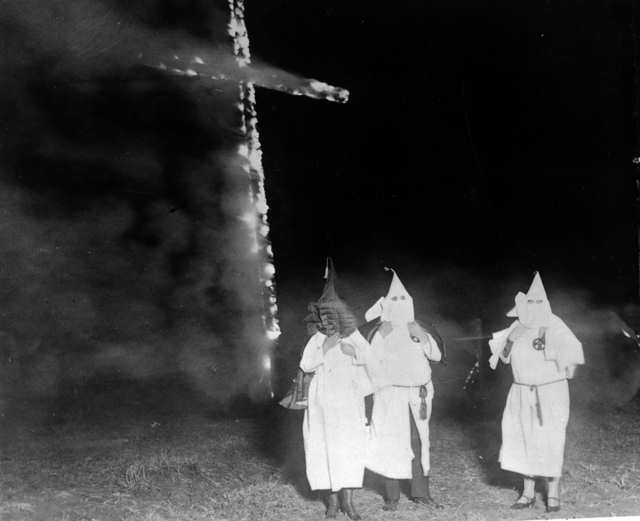
Ku Klux Klan members burning a cross in Denver in 1921.

The Denver community also faced anti-Semitism on multiple occasions in first half of the 20th century. On Christmas Day in 1905, a Jewish immigrant named Jacob Weisskind was out working as a scrapper when he was brutally beaten by a Christian mob "avenging the blood of Christ", and later died of his injuries, in what some have called a lynching. Another Jew working with him was also beaten severely, but survived. Less than two years later, in the midst of the city's newspapers reporting on "anti-Semitic gangs" roaming the West Side, two Jewish immigrants named Tevye (Teve/Tevyah) Bokser and Michael Weissblei (Weisblye/Weisbly) were brutally murdered by two Christian gang members. The perpetrators of these murders received light sentences, and the underlying racial pretext of the killings was discussed in many papers in Denver, and in the Weisskind case, across the country. In the 1920s, the Jewish community also had to contend with the rise of the Ku Klux Klan in the state, concentrated largely in Denver, and its incredible success in taking over Colorado's political offices at nearly every level: from Denver mayor Ben Stapleton to Governor Clarence Morley, and at one point, a majority in both houses of the Colorado General Assembly. While there was not a lot of tangible violence as a result of the Ku Klux Klan's control, there was prevailing anti-Semitic, anti-Catholic, and anti-black rhetoric, and organized boycotts of their businesses.

The Hiawatha Theater (later the Esquire Theatre) at 590 Downing Street in Capitol Hill served as a recurring venue for Jewish cultural programming over a twenty-four-year span documented through the Intermountain Jewish News, from screenings of Symphony of Six Million (1932) and the Yiddish film Mamele (1939) at the Hiawatha through civic events at the renamed Esquire in the 1950s.

West Colfax remained majority Jewish from the 1920s until the 1950s. In the 1940s, after an effective antibiotic to cure tuberculosis was discovered and the number of deaths dropped dramatically, the sanitariums in the city and state slowly shrunk their operations or gradually switched to another medical focus. By the 1950s, the Jewish community of the West Side was beginning to spread out to other areas, most notably the East Side, and later, suburbs. While the Hebrew Educational Alliance school was established in 1920, the 1950s and 1960s saw the opening of the Hillel Academy, Beth Jacob High School for Girls (a Bais Yaakov), and Yeshiva Toras Chaim. In 1975, the Center for Judaic Studies at the University of Denver was founded by Dr. Stanley M. Wagner. The Jewish population of Denver was estimated to be between 23,500 and 30,000 in 1968, and roughly 40,000 in the 1970s as more and more of the community moved into the suburbs.

From 1978 to 1983, the Denver Jewish community was home to a pioneering program that streamlined conversion for Reform, Conservative, and Orthodox candidates in order to ensure that all conversions would be recognized as valid community-wide. When the program was ended in 1983, largely due to the Reform movement's decision to recognize people of patrilineal Jewish descent as Jews for religious purposes, it caused great controversy in Denver and beyond.

In 1984, outspoken and controversial Jewish radio host Alan Berg was killed by white supremacists in Denver.

== Modern community ==
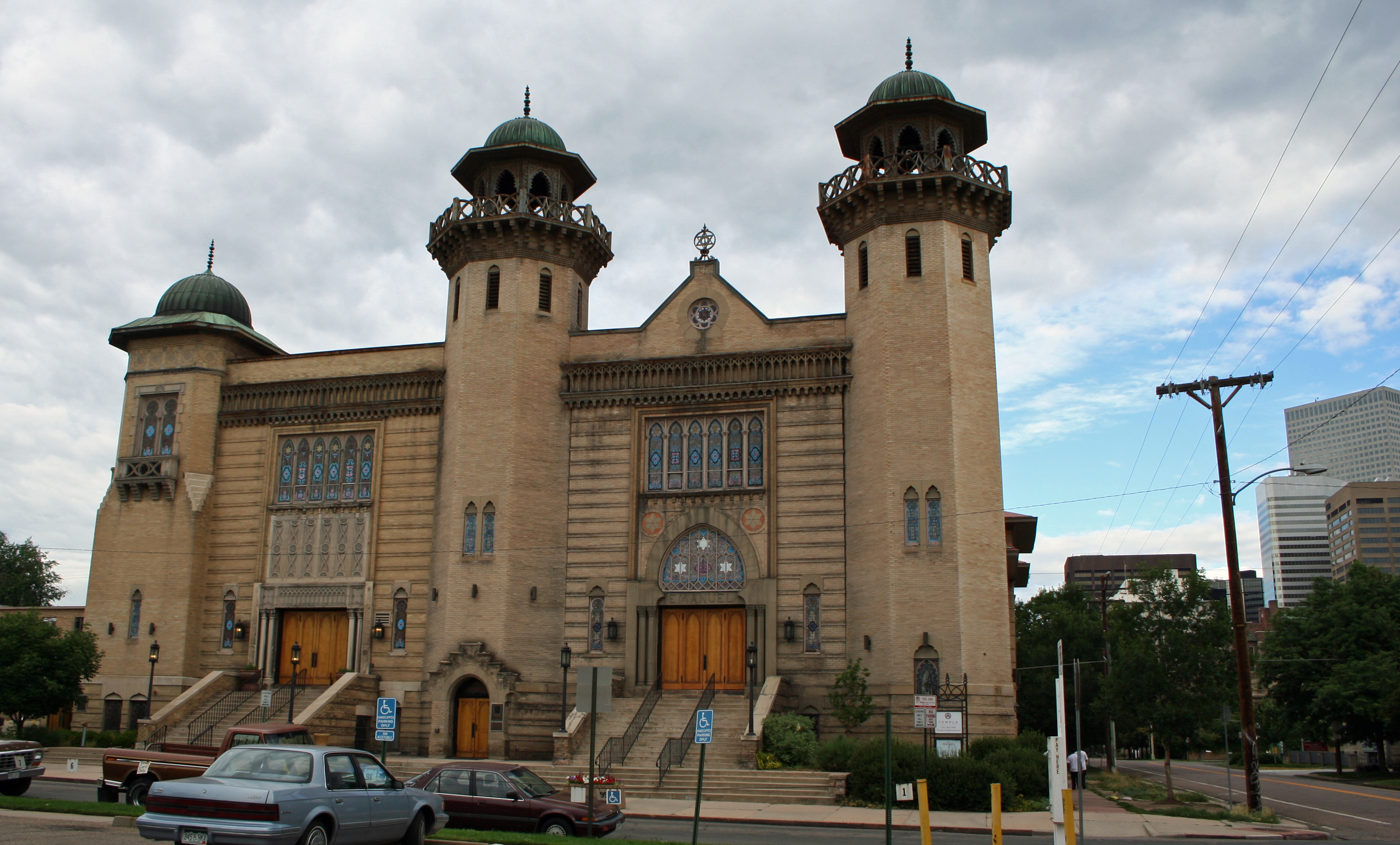
The old Temple Emanuel on Pearl Street, now on the National Register of Historic Places

In 2007, the Jewish population of the Denver-Boulder metro area was about 83,900. A 2013 study estimated the state's Jewish population to be 92,000, with over three quarters of the community living in Denver. There is still an active Haredi community in the West Side who follow Litvak/Lithuanian Jewish tradition, as well as a vibrant Modern Orthodox community, and many Reform and Conservative congregations. The area has 25 active synagogues, including BMH-BJ, the largest Modern Orthodox congregation in Denver which was also the last remaining Orthodox Union (OU) affiliated synagogue to have services with no mechitzah, meaning men and women could sit together, until it resigned from the OU at the end of 2015. There are five Jewish schools in Denver, including Denver Jewish Day School, Denver Academy of Torah, Hillel Academy of Denver, and Yeshiva Toras Chaim.

In addition to its Center for Judaic Studies, the University of Denver is also home to the Rocky Mountain Jewish Historical Society, the Beck Archives, and the Holocaust Awareness Institute. Several Jewish sites in Denver have been placed on the National Register of Historic Places, including the Isaac Solomon Synagogue, the Samsonite House, the Hill Section of Golden Hill Cemetery, and Temple Emanuel's Old Pearl Street Temple. There are Jewish Community Center branches in Denver and Boulder, and other cultural institutions like the Mizel Museum and the Mizel Arts and Culture Center. Numerous nationwide Jewish organizations have offices in Denver, including the Anti-Defamation League, Hadassah, and the National Council of Jewish Women.

=== West Side community ===
The West Side community is the oldest Jewish community in Denver. It is a traditional, Haredi community with its own eruv. The community follows Ashkenazi Jewish traditions as set forth by the Litvak Jewish tradition, that of Lithuanian Judaism. Life in the community is centered on the Denver Community Kollel, Congregation Zera Avraham, Yeshiva Toras Chaim, and Beth Jacob High School of Denver.

The West Colfax neighborhood of Denver was a predominantly Jewish area from the 1920s to the 1950s, as reflected in its residential population, a thriving business community that included kosher markets and other businesses serving Jewish customers, and its cultural facilities. The area's history is reflected by the continuing presence of a significant amount of its Jewish cultural character and institutions.

The West Denver eruv is recognized by city ordinance, and its boundaries are marked by special wires strung from utility poles. These boundaries define a walkable zone in which Jews who observe the traditional rules concerning the Sabbath can congregate and socialize on the Sabbath without breaking those rules.

== Notable people ==
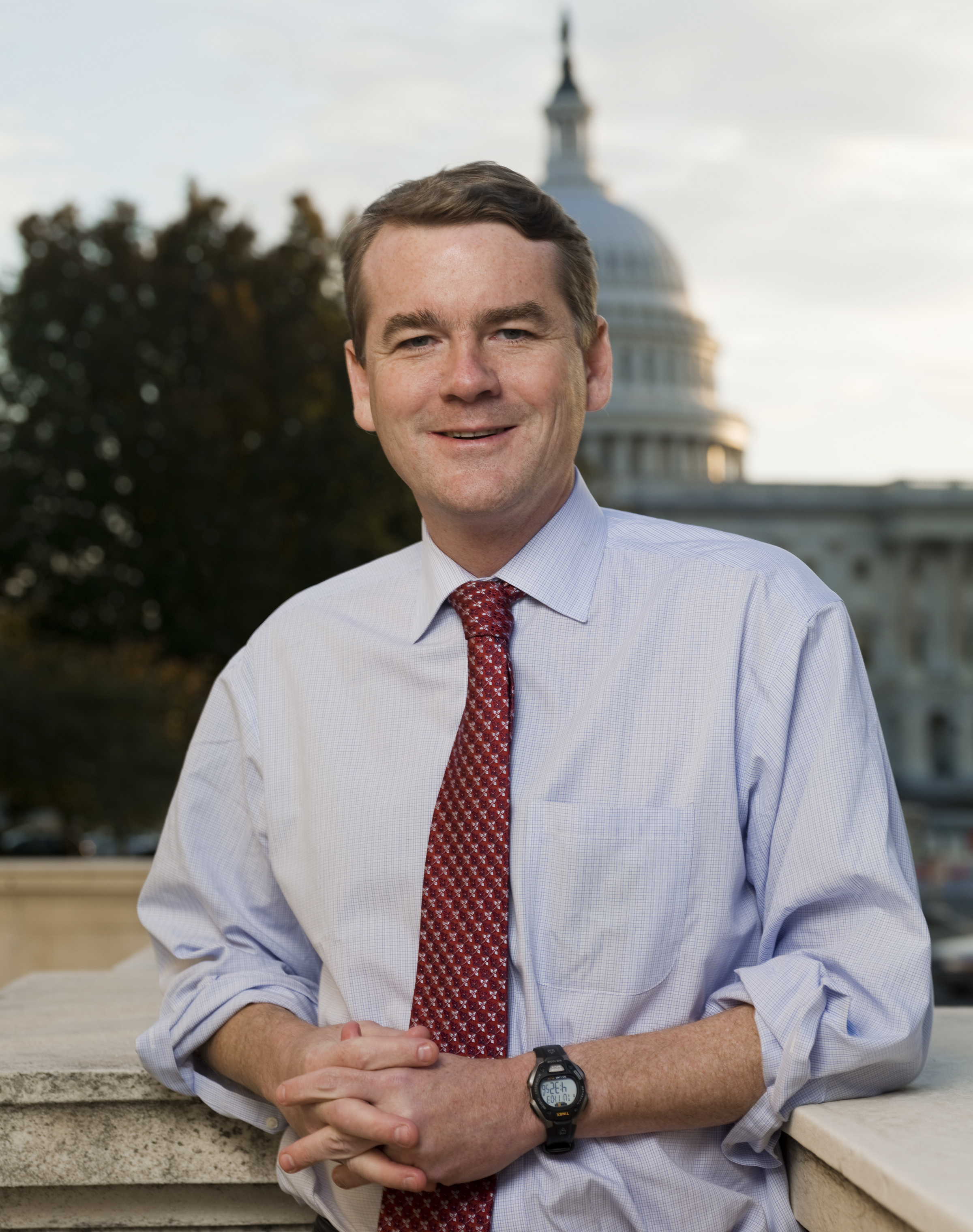
Current U.S. Senator from Colorado Michael Bennet

- Otto Mears (1840–1931), prominent early Coloradan who built roads and railways in areas with difficult terrains.
- Frances Wisebart Jacobs (1843–1892), pioneering philanthropist.
- David Edelstadt (1866–1892), Yiddish-language anarchist poet.
- Simon Guggenheim (1867–1941), United States Senator representing Colorado.
- Jesse Shwayder (1882–1970), Founder, president and chairman of the Samsonite Corporation.
- Yehuda Leib Ginsburg (1888–1946), author of influential commentaries on midrashim.
- H. Leivick (1888–1962), Yiddish-language writer and poet.
- Golda Meir (1898–1978), a member of the West Side community who became fourth Prime Minister of the State of Israel,
- Josef Korbel (1909–1977), Czech-American diplomat and political scientist, father of Madeleine Albright.
- Miriam Goldberg, (1916–2017), longtime publisher of Intermountain Jewish News.
- Ruth Handler (1916–2002), inventor of the Barbie doll.
- Sheldon Beren (1922–1996), oil executive and major Orthodox philanthropist.
- Alan Berg (1934–1984), slain attorney and talk radio host.
- Madeleine Albright (1937–2022), politician and diplomat.
- Larry Mizel (1942 – ), businessman and philanthropist.
- Kenneth D. Tuchman (1959 – ), founder of global outsourcing company TeleTech and philanthropist.
- Michael Bennet (1964 – ), current United States Senator representing Colorado.
- T.J. Miller (1981 – ), comedian, actor, writer, and producer.
- Jared Polis (1975 – ), U.S. Representative and first Jewish Governor of Colorado
- Phil Weiser (1968 - ), current Colorado Attorney General (Governor-elect)
- Jenna Griswold (1984 - ), current Colorado Secretary of State
