= Philippine Cyber Corridor =

The Philippine Cyberservices Corridor is a plan that is being pursued by the government of the Philippines to create interconnected centers of technology-related services, that are spread out all over the country. Services include business process outsourcing, medical transcription, outsourcing of animation, and the like. It is part of the ten-point agenda of then-President Gloria Macapagal Arroyo and is one of the five "super-regions" outlined in her 2006 State of the Nation Address.

The completion of the Philippine Cyber Corridor was expected to accelerate the growth of the Information Technology and Business Process Management (ITM-BPM) Industry in the country. Most recent figures according to the International Labour Organization have shown a total revenue of $18.4 billion in the entire Philippine BPO industry for the year 2014. This figure formed 6 per cent of the entire GDP that year and employed 1.03 million people. The Information Technology and Business Process Association of the Philippines (IBPAP) and the Philippines’ Department of Science and Technology (DOST) outlined in their road map for 2011–2016 forecasts that the BPO industry would reach a target of $25 billion in revenues by 2016. This would form 7.3 per cent of the country's GDP and employ 1.2 million people. The ITM-BPM sector was also expected to support 3.2 million indirect jobs by 2016, which would comprise employees in the Information and Communications Technology (ICT) sector as well as research facilities.

== History ==
The 1987 Constitution of the Philippines cited Information and Communications Technology (ICT) as a key sector to the nation's progress. The Philippine Cyber Corridor was thus conceived as a business that would be able to compete on the international ICT market.

In her sixth State of the Nation Address in 2006, Gloria Macapagal Arroyo promised that her administration would develop the Philippine Cyber Corridor along with other “natural ‘super regions’ of the Philippines". Arroyo believed that the corridor had the potential for increasing telecommunications, technology and education in the country. In addition, she saw the development of the corridor as a counterpoint to the rising number of Overseas Filipino Workers (OFWs), as members of the work force would ideally no longer have to leave the country in order to secure a job. Furthermore, she promised budget increases for science & technology and education, both important to telecommunications.

The Arroyo administration thus embarked on a campaign to increase telecommunications-related services in the country. In 2004, the Commission on Information and Communications Technology (CICT) was established. One of its aims was to fashion the Philippine Cyber Corridor after the Multimedia Super Corridor (MSC) in Malaysia, which was built in 1997.

== Services ==
The PCC hosts BPO companies, call centers, animations studios, software development and gaming businesses, medical and legal transcription outfits, knowledge process outsourcing (KPO) outfits, and back office operations of multinational companies.

== Effect on Local Economy ==
The development of the PCC along key cities in Luzon, Visayas, and Mindanao also aims to create new IT related jobs for fresh graduates of the respective cities. In creating a demand for the IT industry, local schools and colleges were also inclined to adapt their curriculum to equip their students with skills for the IT sector.

Indirectly, the development of the PCC across the nation has also resulted in numerous opportunities for other businesses such to flourish. The hospitality sector, specifically hotels and restaurants catering to ICT and BPO employees, has seen notable growth from this.

== Locations ==
According to Arroyo's 2006 SONA, the corridor runs 600 miles from the city of Baguio in the north of the country to the city of Zamboanga in the south of the country. Call centers have opened in Bacolod City, Iloilo, Cagayan de Oro and Baguio. Business process outsourcing operations have also sprung up in Angeles, Legaspi, and Tacloban. Medical transcription agents centers have been established in Dumaguete, Davao, and Naga.

=== Super Regions ===
On August 19, 2006, Executive Order No. 561 was declared by Former President Gloria Macapagal Arroyo, stating the formation of “super” regions and mandate of the super regional development champions. The Philippine economy was to be restructured into "super" regions to bolster the natural advantages of five distinct sub-economies regions of the country in order to create opportunity across the country.

Five geographical units were grounded into the following "super" regions and would have respective development themes: a) Northern Luzon Agribusiness Quadrangle for agribusiness and was to be composed of Regions I, II, Cordillera Administrative Region (CAR), and the northern part of the provinces of Aurora (north of Baler), Tarlac (north of Tarlac City), Nueva Ecija (north of Cabanatuan City), and Zambales (north of Subic); b) Luzon Urban Beltway for a globally competitive industrial and service center, to be composed of the National Capital Region, (NCR), Region IV-A, the provinces of Bulacan, Bataan, Pampanga, Mindoro, Marinduque, and the southern parts of the provinces of Tarlac, Zambales, Aurora and Nueva Ecija; c) Central Philippines for tourism, to be composed of Regions V, VI, VII, and VIII, and the provinces of Romblon, Palawan, and Camiguin, and the Island of Siargao; d) Agribusiness Mindanao for agribusiness, to be composed of Regions IX, X except Camigiun, XI, XII, Caraga except Siargao, and the Autonomous Region in Muslim Mindanao; and e) Cyber Corridor for information and communication technology and knowledge economy, which traverses the above "super" regions from Baguio to Cebu to Davao.

Development champions were also assigned for each super region, and their roles included serving as catalyst for development of the strategic theme in his area, ensuring the implementation of priority programs and projects, work out operational policies and remedial actions, as well as submitting a monthly report to the Presidential Management staff. The Development Champions are the following: a) North Luzon Agribusiness Quadrangle - PMS Director-General Arthur Yap; b) Luzon Urban Beltway - Subic-Clark Alliance for Development Chairman Edgardo Pamintuan; c) Central Philippines - Secretary of Tourism Joseph Ace Durano; Secretary Cerge Remonde shall be the Cabinet Officer for Regional Development of region VII; d) Agribusiness Mindanao - Presidential Adviser for the Peace Process Jesus Dureza; e) Cyber Corridor - Commission on Information and Communication Technology Chairman Ramon Sales.

=== Next Wave Cities ===
Former President Gloria Macapagal Arroyo served as a guest speaker at the Angeles University Foundation (AUF) on February 1, 2010, and at the Jose Rizal University on February 2, 2010, during her “cyber corridor” tour. This tour started in Pampanga and was said to highlight the former president's achievements in terms of the digital infrastructure built during her term as well as the rise of the business process outsourcing (BPO) industry. During her speech, the former president mentioned that the cyber corridor stretched from “the north from Metro Pampanga and goes down to the south of Davao City.” Arroyo also listed 10 urban areas in the Philippines that known as “Next Wave Cities” also form the cyber corridor. These cities include: Metro Laguna, Metro Cavite, Iloilo, Davao, Bacolod, Metro Pampanga, Metro Bulacan, Cagayan de Oro, Central Bulacan and Lipa. These cities are said to be the “best new destinations of the ICT industry."

On 2016, 10 cities were proclaimed as the official Next Wave Cities based on the following criteria: talent, infrastructure cost, and business environment. The cities are, in alphabetical order: Baguio City, Cagayan de Oro City, Dagupan City, Dasmarinas City, Dumaguete City, Lipa City, Malolos City, Naga City, Sta. Rosa City, and Taytay City.

Apart from these Next Wave Cities, 10 “New Emerging Cities” are also recognized for the potential in becoming Next Wave Cities. These cities are, in alphabetical order: Balanga City, Batangas City, Iriga City, Laoag City, Legazpi City, Puerto Princesa City, Roxas City, Tarlac City, Tuguegarao City, and Zamboanga City.

== See also ==
- Business process outsourcing in the Philippines
- Offshoring
- Outsourcing
- IT Services
