= Aptara =

Company in Falls Church, United States

Aptara, Inc.
- Formerly: TechBooks, Inc.
- Company type: Private
- Industry: Media, publishing, e-learning, digital learning, outsourcing
- Founded: 1988
- Headquarters: Falls Church, Virginia, United States
- Number of employees: ≈5,600 (2018)
- Website: www.aptaracorp.com

Aptara, Inc. is a US-based media company specializing in digital content development. It is headquartered in Falls Church, Virginia. Aptara's services include content production, digital publishing, data conversion, editorial services, eLearning and technology development, legal content solutions, and business process outsourcing (BPO). Its customers include publishers, information aggregators, professional societies, universities and corporations worldwide.

The company has operations in Noida, Pune, Dehradun and Kerala, India. Aptara is considered one of the leading knowledge process outsourcing (KPO) companies in India.

== History ==
The company was founded in 1988 as TechBooks, Inc. by a sibling entrepreneurial team, including Rakesh Gupta, Neal Gupta and Anita Gupta.

In 1999, TechBooks acquired York Graphic Services, which became its print division. After integrating York's content preparation business into its own operations, TechBooks sold the division under its former name in 2001. The sale was part of the company's strategy for focusing on its core businesses at the time: data conversion and production of cross-media content. In 2001, the print group accounted for about $8 million of TechBooks' $54-million revenues.

In 2000, TechBooks had 1,100 employees in New Delhi, India, and 500 at operations in Pennsylvania, California, and Virginia. Total revenues approached $60 million in spite of a difficult environment for tech firms. Its rate of growth was sufficient to land it a spot on the Inc. 500 list of up-and-coming small companies. Around this time, TechBooks acquired a couple of content preparers, including The PRD Group of Shippensburg, Pennsylvania and The GTS Companies of Los Angeles.

By August 2005, TechBooks raised a total of $24 million in three rounds of funding from various investors.

In August 2005, equity firm American Capital, Ltd. made an investment of $45 million in TechBooks to support the company's recapitalization. In the same month, TechBooks acquired online learning firm Maximize Learning, which was based in Pune, India. At that moment, the number of TechBooks' employees reached around 2,900. The company's total revenues were $60 million in 2005.

Later, American Capital and its associates made further investments of $50 million in the company to support its growth.

In September 2006, TechBooks acquired Los Angeles-based Whitmont Legal Technologies, which provided litigation support services. At that time, TechBooks employed more than 4,000 workers. In October 2006, the company opened its new main office in Falls Church, Virginia. (Previously it was based in Fairfax, Virginia; both cities are in the Washington metropolitan area).

In January 2007, TechBooks changed its name to Aptara, Inc. According to Aptara, the decision to change the name was related to the company's aspiration to reach markets outside the publishing industry. The company planned to apply its "content transformation expertise to other markets, such as legal services and the financial and automotive industries".

On February 7, 2012, American Capital sold Aptara, Inc. to iEnergizer, a publicly traded UK company, for $144 million. The equity firm has earned 17% compounded annual rate on its investment in Aptara. At the time of the sale, Aptara had roughly 5,000 employees.

== Recognition ==
- The company was one of the world's 50 best-managed BPO vendors according to The Black Book of Outsourcing in 2005.
- In 2014 the company was rated one of the top 100 outsourcing service providers globally according to the International Association of Outsourcing Professionals.
