= Call center industry in the Philippines =

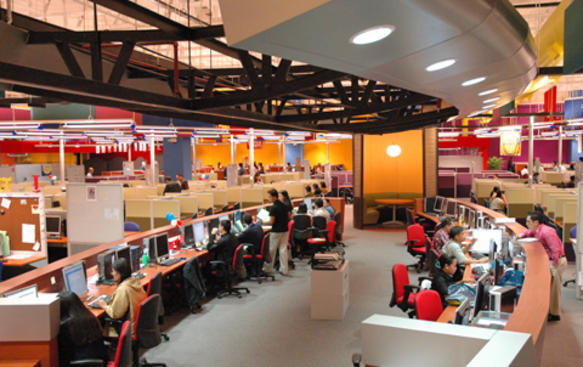
A Teletech BPO site in Cainta, Rizal

Call centers in the Philippines began as providers of email response and managing services then broadened to industrial capabilities for almost all types of customer relations, ranging from travel services, technical support, education, customer care, financial services, online business-to-customer support, and online business-to-business support. The call center industry is one of the fastest growing in the country.

The Philippines is also considered a location of choice due to its less expensive operational and labor costs, and a constant stream of college-educated graduates entering the already mostly young workforce. The Filipino people also generally show proficiency in American-style English as well as slang, and a strong familiarity with U.S. and European cultures. Today, the Philippines remains a top business process outsourcing (BPO) destination for the estimated $150-billion BPO industry. More than a million Filipinos are employed by call centers.

== Types of support ==
The calls managed by a number of Philippine call centers can be categorized into one of two types: outbound calls and inbound calls. Outbound calls include advisories, sales verification, customer services, surveys, collections and telemarketing. Inbound calls include account inquiries, verification, technical support, sales and various customer services.

== Recruitment and training process ==
The recruitment process for new call center agents may include the following:

- Phone Screening – this stage determines the voice quality over the phone and how the applicant responds to the call;
- Initial Interview – conducted by the company human resource department or another outsource staffing firm to test the speaking skills, attitude and confidence of the applicant in responding to questions;
- Examination – this includes aptitude tests, computer-based call simulations and emotional quotient (EQ) tests; and
- Final Interview – to assess customer service, technical, or sales skills.

There are various ways in which one may initiate a career in call centers, the most common of which is to apply directly to a call center's recruitment office. This process is commonly coined as a "walk-in" application. Another procedure includes an employee referral, where an applicant is referred by an existing employee of a call center. A person may also apply through an employment agency, which will conduct its own screening procedures, before endorsing an applicant to any call center.

An emerging manner to apply for a career in a call center is through online application, as it provides applicants with an easier way of acquiring more information on the call center or business, an easier application and resume submission and allows Filipinos in more far or remote areas to apply.

== Outsourcing ==
The global recession in 2008 resulted in the loss of jobs for many Overseas Filipino Workers (OFWs). This prompted the Philippine government to assist OFWs transition to call center agents. The government program, funded by the Overseas Workers Welfare Administration (OWWA), is part of the government's vocational scholarship program of OWWA and reintegration for OFWs returning to the country.

This low cost industry has come under threat due to steadily-appreciating local currency. Philippines is now 30 per cent more expensive than India due to a 30-per cent difference in peso and Indian rupee exchange rates with the US dollar.

== See also ==
- Business process outsourcing in the Philippines
- Call center industry in Bangladesh
- Cyberservices
- Economy of the Philippines
- Medical transcription
- Offshoring
- Outsourcing
- Philippine Cyber Corridor
