= Call centre industry in India =

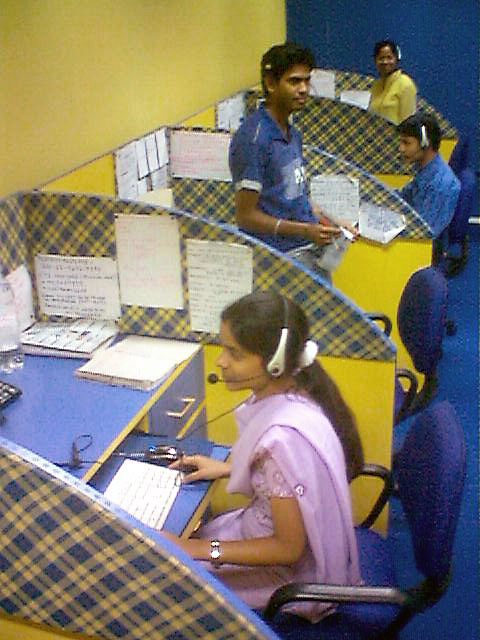
A call centre in India

The call centre industry in India is a part of India's business process outsourcing industry.

== Background ==
A call centre is an office with the capacity to field many telephone calls for a company. Types of call centre work can include customer service and telemarketing. Factors that have made India attractive as a hub of call centre work from the English-speaking world include its convenient time zone, low labour costs, and large English-speaking population. The introduction of call centre and other business processing work to India increased in the 1990s as companies began offshore outsourcing this work to India. British Airways, American Express, AT&T, United Airlines and Dell are examples of companies that utilise call centres in India. Other countries with comparable call centre industries include Bangladesh and the Philippines.

== Labour force ==
There were approximately 350,000 call centre workers in India as of February 2015. Call centre workers in India are largely under the age of thirty, unmarried, and college-educated, regardless of gender. Call centre work is typically done overnight to accommodate time zones in the US, UK, and Australia, and employees are required to be fluent in English.

=== Gendered dynamics ===
Although there are roughly equal numbers of men and women working in the lower levels of the call centre industry, scholars analyse gendered dynamics of call center work because of the association of call centre work tasks with femininity and feminine traits such as hospitality and empathy. There are also fewer job opportunities for women (see also: gender inequality in India) and the wages of call centre jobs are higher relative to other jobs that are open to women. Women in call centre work are more likely to consider their jobs as permanent, or as their permanent employment until they marry, whereas men typically view their call centre jobs as temporary.

There have been many scholars that have studied the gendered impacts of call centre work on Indian women. Some of these researchers have claimed that there are ways in which call centre work subverts gendered expectations of Indian womanhood, and can thus be in some ways liberating. Many of these scholars point to the opportunity for financial gain or independence. They have also taken into consideration the workplaces themselves as environments where gender norms are subverted, though these environments are still hierarchical with men still more commonly holding leadership positions.

Singh and Pandey in their research on the impact of call centre work on the health of female call centre workers in India found that many young women suffered from ailments such as indigestion, eye strain, headache, and sleep disorder due to the abnormal hours call centre work entails. To adjust to the hours, many workers turned to and subsequently became addicted to caffeine and cigarettes.

Various researchers describe the stigma that Indian women experience when they work at night as call centre work requires. Being outside of the house at night is not considered respectable for single young Indian women, and thus challenges gendered expectations. Because of this the reputations of young women working in call centres are called into question, which in turn can prevent their families from making any gain in status from their employment.

== Criticism ==
Many customers of companies using Indian call centres dislike the practice, partly because of frequent difficulties caused by accent, and partly because of the loss of equivalent employment in their own country. There is also the factor mentioned below that many scam telephone calls originate in India and some customers fail to distinguish them from genuine calls from legitimate Indian call centres. Consequently, some Western companies have now moved their call centres back to their home country. It has become a selling point in advertising for companies to have a home based call centre.

At the same time there has been a growth in telephone scamming, such as technical support scams, from criminal call centres in India masquerading as legitimate ones of well known companies, usually initiated by a cold call to a potential victim with a claim that there is a problem with their account. Some of the agents at the scam call centres have previously worked at legitimate ones, so have been trained in dealing with customers and their plausibility is increased by their knowing the procedures and operations of the legitimate companies.

== Media portrayals ==
Indian call centres have been the focus of several documentary films, the 2004 film Thomas L. Friedman Reporting: The Other Side of Outsourcing, the 2005 films John and Jane, Nalini by Day, Nancy by Night, and 1-800-India: Importing a White-Collar Economy, and the 2006 film Bombay Calling, among others. An Indian call centre is also the subject of the 2006 film Outsourced and a key location in the 2008 film, Slumdog Millionaire.

Chetan Bhagat's bestselling book One Night @ the Call Center is based on call centre employees.
