= Enshored =

American outsouring company

- Company type: Privately held company
- Industry: Business process outsourcing
- Founded: 2014; 12 years ago
- Headquarters: Long Beach, California, United States
- Area served: Philippines, United States, Europe
- Key people: Ian Jackson (CEO)
- Number of employees: 2,500
- Website: www.enshored.com

Enshored is an American outsourcing company founded in 2014 which provides outsourcing services such as customer service, sales support, back office, and content moderation from the Philippines and Portugal.

Its headquarters are located in Long Beach, California and it operates from three locations in the Philippines as well as from Lisbon, Portugal. Enshored works with start-ups and scale-ups in disruptive industries.

== History ==
=== Foundation ===
Enshored started operations in 2014. It was co-founded by Ian Jackson and Jeff Bauer, who died in October 2016. In 2022 Enshored opened its first offices in Europe (Lisbon, Portugal)

=== 2014 - present ===
Enshored, like many companies in the Business Process Outsourcing (BPO) industry, runs its operations in the Philippines. The Philippines BPO sector had a revenue target of US$25.5 billion and 1.4 million people employed for 2017.

Additional related 2018 figures for the country Business Process Management (BPM) indicates a US$14.6 billion revenue and 890 thousand employees. These figures are estimated to grow to US$20.4 billion in revenue and 1.1 million employees by 2022. BPM, as well as BPO, are complementary services that focus on improving company processes.

In 2018, Enshored was recognized in a survey of LA companies as enjoying one of the most diversified workforces.

In 2019, Enshored was recognized as one of the top 50 companies in the US for Work-Life Balance category in a survey.

In 2022, Enshored was recognized by Inc magazine for the 4th time among its list of fastest-growing US companies
