= AZB =

AZB may refer to:

- South Azerbaijani language (ISO 639:azb), also called Iranian Azerbaijani
- AZB & Partners, a law firm in India
- Azb DMR MK1, a Pakistani semi-automatic Designated marksman rifle/sniper rifle
