= Sheldon Beren =

American oil executive, activist and philanthropist

Sheldon K. Beren (October 7, 1922 – February 12, 1996) was an oil executive from Denver, Colorado, was a renowned activist and philanthropist on behalf of Orthodox Jewish education. Known for significantly aiding in the creation of Hillel Academy of Denver, Beth Jacob High School of Denver, and Yeshiva Toras Chaim of Denver, Sheldon is often acknowledged as the driving force behind Orthodox Jewish education in the Mile High City.

== Early life ==
Sheldon was born in 1922 in Marietta, Ohio. He attended Harvard University, where he received his BS in chemistry. Before beginning his business career, Sheldon worked as a researcher for the United States Army.

== Career ==
Sheldon's family business, Berenenergy Corporation of Denver, engaged in oil exploration and production.

== Community Projects ==
Sheldon was involved in several major community projects in America and in Israel. Among the beneficiaries of his work are: Yeshiva University, the Rabbi Isaac Elchanan Theological Seminary, the American Committee for Shaare Zedek Medical Center in Jerusalem, Boys Town Jerusalem, and several Orthodox rabbinical seminaries on the East Coast.

Aside from his national and international philanthropic work, Sheldon is notable for being the driving force behind the three main Orthodox educational institutions in Denver: Hillel Academy, Denver's Jewish Orthodox elementary school; Beth Jacob High School, Denver's all-girl's Orthodox Jewish high-school; and Yeshiva Toras Chaim, Denver's Orthodox Jewish Talmudic academy, and the first full-time yeshiva founded west of Pennsylvania.
