= Hugo Inc. =

Business process outsourcing company

Hugo Technologies, Inc.
- Trade name: Hugo
- Type: Private
- Industry: Business process outsourcing
- Founded: 2017
- Founders: Orinola Gbadebo-Smith; Simone Bartlett
- Headquarters: 401 N Michigan Ave, Chicago, Illinois, United States
- Key people: Orinola Gbadebo-Smith (Chief Executive Officer); Simone Bartlett (Chief Operating Officer)
- Website: hugoinc.com

Hugo Technologies, Inc., doing business as Hugo, is an American business process outsourcing (BPO) company. The company provides customer support, digital operations, trust and safety, and data and artificial intelligence services, covering technical support levels from Tier 1 to Tier 3.

== History ==
Hugo was founded by Orinola Gbadebo-Smith and Simone Bartlett in 2017. The company managed distributed customer experience, digital operations, and data annotation teams based in Africa for technology, retail, media, and artificial intelligence firms.

In 2024, Hugo was selected by the Challenge Fund for Youth Employment (CFYE), a Netherlands Ministry of Foreign Affairs–funded programme. After that, the company also operates Hugo Academy, an internal training program for customer experience, digital operations, and data annotation professionals in African markets. Partnering with the Challenge Fund for Youth Employment in 2024, the program created 1,300 jobs over three years, primarily in Nigeria.

In 2024 and 2025, the company was named to the Clutch 100 list of fastest-growing B2B services companies for the first time. In November 2025, the company was named Overall Impact Champion at the Outsource Accelerator Outsourcing Impact Review (OIR) 2025 Awards for its Hugo Academy programme, and received a Silver award for its Health & Wellness programme.

In December 2025, Hugo acquired Gold Mountain Communications, LLC, a U.S.-based contact center. Gold Mountain continued operating under its own name as a subsidiary of Hugo.

In April 2026, Hugo was named Outsource Partner of the Year at the Business Intelligence Group's Excellence in Customer Service Awards 2026. The following month, the company was included in the Clutch 100 for a third consecutive year.
