= Novadios =

American law business

- Company type: Limited Liability Company
- Industry: Legal Process Outsourcing
- Founded: 2008 in U.S. and Argentina
- Founder: Joaquin Acuña, Ash Anderson, Matias Avila Nores
- Headquarters: Los Angeles, California, U.S.
- Number of locations: 2
- Area served: U.S. - U.K.
- Services: Legal
- Subsidiaries: Novadios S.A.

Novadios is a privately held legal services outsourcing company headquartered in Los Angeles, California with its labor operations facility located in Córdoba, Argentina. Novadios provides legal process outsourcing services to in-house counsel and law firms located in the U.S. and the U.K. through the utilization of Argentine legal professionals in conjunction with U.S. legal supervision.

== Services ==
Novadios operates two primary practice groups: the Transactional Services Group and the Litigation Support Group. The Transactional Services Group renders legal services to corporate customers and law firms in the areas of contract review and drafting; document review; corporate governance support; legal form creation and administration; Latin American legal and corporate services; data mining and Six Sigma LEAN consultation services for legal departments. The Transactional Services Group's capabilities are implemented most commonly within a company's procurement, information technology, intellectual property licensing, treasury, and entertainment divisions. The Litigation Support Group renders primary and secondary level document review services in connection with potential litigation and in response to subpoena requests, including relevancy and privileged analysis determinations.
