= List of higher education institutions in Denver =

Denver's many colleges and universities range in age and study programs. The city has Roman Catholic and Jewish institutions, as well as two medical schools in its suburbs. In addition to those schools within the city, there are a number of schools located throughout the surrounding metro area.

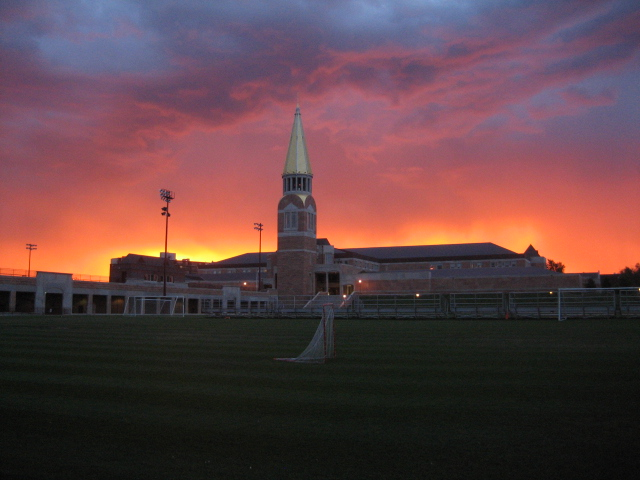
The Ritchie Center at University of Denver

== Public ==
=== Auraria Campus ===
- Community College of Denver
- Metropolitan State University of Denver
- University of Colorado Denver

== Private ==
=== Non-profit ===
- Regis University
- University of Denver

=== For-profit ===
- The Art Institute of Colorado
- Colorado Technical University
- Lincoln College of Technology (formerly known as Denver Automotive and Diesel College)
- National American University
- Rocky Mountain College of Art and Design
- Rocky Vista University College of Osteopathic Medicine

=== Seminaries ===
- Denver Seminary
- Iliff School of Theology
- Saint John Vianney Theological Seminary
- Yeshiva Toras Chaim Talmudical Seminary
