= Legal outsourcing =

Using an outside provider for legal services

Legal outsourcing, also known as legal process outsourcing (LPO), refers to the practice of a law firm or corporation obtaining legal support services from an outside law firm or legal support services company (LPO provider). When the LPO provider is based in another country, the practice is called offshoring and involves the practice of outsourcing any activity except those where personal presence or contact is required, e.g. appearances in court and face-to-face negotiations. When the LPO provider is based in the same country, the practice of outsourcing includes agency work and other services requiring a physical presence, such as court appearances. This process is one of the incidents of the larger movement towards outsourcing. The most commonly offered services have been agency work, document review, legal research and writing, drafting of pleadings and briefs, and patent services.

Outsourcing is often used by companies to reduce operational costs and access labor markets in other countries, while also creating employment opportunities in recipient nations. Outsourcing is explained as turning over a project to an exterior provider that will execute the project on behalf of the central companies.

This phenomenon has been a part of the legal experience since the 1950s, where it was restricted only to patents. Later, firms began to contract certain services to back door firms. The process of subcontracting part of the legal process to different countries is at a nascent stage, with relatively consistent market growth. Legal process outsourcing has predominantly been to countries that had previously taken advantage of the business process outsourcing wave. LPO providers have established themselves in Canada, South Africa, India, the Philippines, the United States, Israel, and Latin America.

== Overview ==
The concept of legal process outsourcing is based on the division of labour principle, prevalent in law firms, where various time consuming and onerous processes like due diligence are delegated to paralegals, document reviewers or interns. This allows the firm to address the various legal issues that arise on a daily basis while being able to streamline productivity.

The process involves a contract, with due consideration, between both firms. The following are the various methods by which the process could be initiated:

- Direct Contract – This is the most straight forward means of establishing contact. The firm needing legal services directly approaches the legal process outsourcing vendor.
- Managed Outsourcing – This is a case where the firm establishes contact with a legal process outsourcing vendor and retains a traditional law firm to coordinate the vendor's activities and to ensure quality control.
- Required Outsourcing – This form of outsourcing occurs when the firm mandates a certain level of outsourcing in the legal process, either to reduce costs or to fulfill statutory requirements.
- Multi-sourcing – This involves segregating the work assigned to LPO providers in order to reduce risk and take advantage of each provider's strengths. This approach is helpful in cases where expertise is required on matters of jurisdiction and merits. Having more than one provider "on deck" also allows a service recipient to obtain more favorable pricing. On the other hand, multi-sourcing can be more complicated than other approaches. Successfully managing multiple, competing providers requires strong and effective governance procedures.

=== Reasons ===
Among the leading proponents of this process have been corporate clients concerned with rising legal expenses. The legal departments of corporations began using the services of such providers. Soon these corporations began to pressure their legal representatives to outsource certain legal processes to cut costs.

== Advantages ==
Most firms and corporations outsource primarily to save cash, and this is considered the biggest advantage for legal outsourcing. While an attorney in major legal markets such as the US may charge from $150 to $500 per hour when performing rote services, legal process outsourcing firms generally charge a small fraction of that price. It has attracted major corporations to outsource specific work outside their legal departments. Many destinations for outsourcing have benefited from the upsurge in bankruptcies and litigations after the 2008 financial crisis.

As reported in the ABA Journal, "[t]he market for outsourced legal work is booming in India. While lawyers there are doing a lot of routine work, they are also handling some interesting legal matters, including work for the makers of movies and television shows." As stated in USA Today, "'[y]ou could call it "Outsourcing 2.0" or maybe even "3.0." Now firms are increasingly trying to leverage expertise,' says Saikat Chaudhuri, an assistant professor in the business school at the University of Pennsylvania. Legal Outsourcing is 'growing very, very quickly.'"

=== LPO industry and the 2008 financial crisis ===
LPO firms in India had predicted an annual growth of 200% due to recession related litigation and the increased need to save costs in the US. Their expectations have not been met. The major reason for this is that US lawyers themselves have started looking at alternative fee structures due to the recession and job losses. In spite of setbacks, the LPO industry has seen growth of about 40-60% in the last year. Although some areas of practice, such as real estate, have drastically collapsed due to the recession, some areas such as litigation, document review, and corporate compliance have gained ground, resulting in business directed to LPO firms in India.

== Criticisms ==
One of the major concerns with outsourcing is the potential for breaches of client confidentiality. In legal process outsourcing the issue of client confidentiality assumes utmost importance. The attorney–client privilege is a doctrine that says anything conveyed between an attorney and his client shall be treated with utmost confidentiality and is exempted from disclosure even in a court of law. However, when either party discloses confidential information to a third party or the opposite party, the privilege is deemed to be waived. During the early years of legal process outsourcing, many law firms hesitated to outsource their work. Critics and opponents state that, since communication is being sent to a country other than United States, the confidentiality is broken; hence, the attorney client privilege has been waived. However, American Bar Association clarified this in 2008, clearing the way for the development of legal process outsourcing.

Another criticism is that people performing legal work may not be bound to necessary ethical standards. The process of Legal Outsourcing has come in conflict with the Model Code of Conduct issued by the American Bar Association. However, there have been ethics opinions from various local bar associations (New York, San Diego) and recently the American Bar Association that discuss ethical legal outsourcing and how to achieve it. However, there is criticism that the use of legal outsourcing creates a breach of ABA Model Rule 5.4 which prohibits attorneys from sharing fees with non-attorneys and, also, the prohibition on the practice of law by foreign non-attorneys.

== New frontiers ==
India is considered to be a major destination for legal outsourcing due to its availability of affordable English-speaking lawyers, some of whom are UK and/or US educated, and due to a legal system that is based on English common law. Recently, new frontiers for legal outsourcing have emerged in geographic areas closer to their target client markets. Other established LPO providers can be found in Argentina, Australia, China, France, the Philippines, Singapore, and South Korea, each offering unique advantages concomitant with their distinctive geographic location, language capabilities and regional expertise. "There is natural arbitrage between the excellent talented and low cost professionals in India, compared to the US and other developed jurisdictions, especially in the litigation management space", believes Zia Mody, managing partner AZB & Partners, one of the biggest law firms in India. Argentina, for example, is an increasingly desirable LPO centre for the U.S. client market due to its proximity in terms of its western hemisphere location, time zone similarity, and cultural ties to the United States. Sri Lanka, as an additional example, is an Indian competitor whose success has come from a familiarity with British law, a strong economic infrastructure, online freedom, and marketing by Indian policymakers. LPO providers in India and in these new frontiers are increasingly utilizing onshore and offshore US and UK-licensed attorneys as part of their outsourcing offering as a means to create greater quality controls, expand into more sophisticated offerings, and instill higher confidence in the ethical treatment of client sensitive data.

== See also ==
- Management service organization (MSO)
- Knowledge process outsourcing
- Recruitment
