= Soli Sorabjee =

Indian jurist (1930–2021)

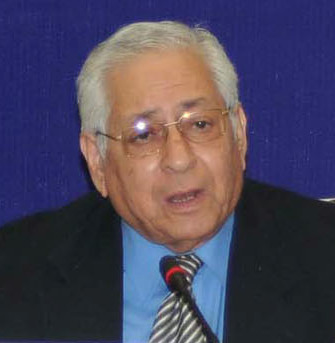
- Sorabjee in 2011

7th Attorney General of India
- In office 7 April 1998 – 4 June 2004
- Prime Minister: Atal Bihari Vajpayee
- Preceded by: Ashok Desai
- Succeeded by: Milon K. Banerji
- In office 9 December 1989 – 2 December 1990
- Prime Minister: V. P. Singh
- Preceded by: K. Parasaran
- Succeeded by: G. Ramaswamy

Personal details
- Born: 9 March 1930 Bombay, Bombay Presidency, British India (now Mumbai, Maharashtra, India)
- Died: 30 April 2021 (aged 91) Delhi, India
- Awards: Padma Vibhushan; Padma Bhushan; Member of the Order of Australia

Soli Jehangir Sorabjee, AM (9 March 1930 – 30 April 2021) was an Indian jurist who served as Attorney-General for India from 1989 to 1990, and again from 1998 to 2004. In 2002, he received the Padma Vibhushan for his defence of the freedom of expression and the protection of human rights.

== Early life ==
Soli Jehangir Sorabjee was born on 9 March 1930 in Bombay to a Parsi family. He studied at Bharda New High School, Mumbai and St. Xavier's College, Mumbai and Government Law College, Mumbai, and was admitted to the bar in 1953. At Government Law College, he was awarded the Kinloch Forbes Gold Medal in Roman Law and Jurisprudence (1952).

== Career ==
In 1971, Sorabjee was designated a senior advocate of the Bombay High Court. He served as Solicitor-General of India from 1977 to 1980. He was appointed Attorney-General for India on 9 December 1989 up to 2 December 1990, and then again on 7 April 1998, a post he held until 2004.

In March 2002, Soli Sorabjee received the Padma Vibhushan for his defence of the freedom of expression and the protection of human rights. During The Emergency (1975-1977), Sorabjee provided legal services to political prisoners. He later worked on the Citizen's Justice Committee which represented the 1984 anti-Sikh riots victims pro bono.

In March 2006 he was appointed an honorary member of the Order of Australia (AM), "for service to Australia-India bilateral legal relations".

Sorabjee was involved in several precedent-setting cases concerning the interpretation of the Constitution of India. Sorabjee and Fali Nariman assisted the petitioner's counsel in Kesavananda Bharati v. State of Kerala, which restricted Parliament from altering the "basic structure" of the Constitution. As Solicitor-General, he was a member of the government's legal delegation in Maneka Gandhi v Union of India, which held that Article 21 of the Constitution promulgated the right of personal liberty. He was also involved in S. R. Bommai v. Union of India, which imposed restrictions on President's rule, and I.R. Coelho v. State of Tamil Nadu, which held that laws passed under the Ninth Schedule of the Constitution are not exempt from judicial review. He appeared in the case of B.P. Singhal v. Union of India, in which the Supreme Court held that state governors could not be dismissed without due cause. He aided the petitioner in Shreya Singhal v. Union of India, which targeted restrictions on online speech in the Information Technology Act, 2000.

=== Offices ===
He was the chairman of Transparency International and Convenor of the Minority Rights Group. He served as Special Rapporteur to Nigeria for the United Nations Human Rights Commission in 1997, and as a member of the United Nations Subcommission on Prevention of Discrimination and Protection of Minorities from 1998 onwards. Sorabjee served as member of the Permanent Court of Arbitration at The Hague from 2000 to 2006.

Soli J. Sorabjee was vice-president of the Commonwealth Lawyers Association and a member of the Committee on Arms Control and Disarmament Law of the International Law Association.

== Personal life ==
Sorabjee was a close friend and colleague of Nanabhoy Palkhivala. Sorabjee's daughter, Zia Mody, is also the Managing Partner at AZB & Partners. Zia Mody is the author of the book 10 Judgements that Changed India. Sorabjee is also survived by three sons—Jehangir, a doctor, Hormazd Sorabjee, editor of the Autocar India magazine and Jamshed.—and seven grandchildren named Niki, Ardeshir, Raian, Maya, Anjali, Aarti, and Aditi.

Sorabjee was the first president of the Jazz India Association. He played the clarinet; his favourite artists included Benny Goodman and Dizzy Gillespie.

He died of COVID-19, on 30 April 2021 in a private hospital in Delhi where he was undergoing treatment.

== Publications ==
=== Books ===
- Law of Press Censorship in India. Bombay: N.M. Tripathi. 1976. OCLC 639092798.
- The Emergency, Censorship and the Press in India, 1975–77. London: Writers and Scholars Educational Trust. 1977. ISBN 0-904286-00-2. OCLC 3865883.
- The Governor, Sage or Saboteur. New Delhi: Roli Books International. 1985. OCLC 13797698.
- Law & Justice: An Anthology. Delhi: Universal Law Pub. Co. 2003. ISBN 81-7534-367-2. OCLC 55961332.

=== Essays and monographs ===
- "Fundamental Rights". Public Law in India. New Delhi: Vikas. 1982. ISBN 0-7069-1390-6. OCLC 9504480.
- Venkataramiah, E. S, ed. (1988). "Protection of Human Rights in Emergencies". Human Rights in the Changing World. New Delhi: International Law Association, Regional Branch (India). OCLC 609511690.
- Henkin, Louis; Rosenthal, Albert J., eds. (1990). "Equity in the United States and India". Constitutionalism and Rights: The Influence of the United States Constitution abroad. New York: Columbia University Press. ISBN 0-231-06570-1. OCLC 18962022.

=== Articles ===
- "Obliging Government to Control Itself; Recent Development in Indian Administrative Law". Public Law. 1994. ISSN 0033-3565.
- "Freedom of Expression and Censorship: Some Aspects of the Indian Experience". Northern Ireland Legal Quarterly. 45: 327–342. 1994 – via HeinOnline.
- Sorabjee, Soli K. (October 1993). "Freedom of Expression". Commonwealth Law Bulletin. 19 (4): 1712–1721. doi:10.1080/03050718.1993.9986320. ISSN 0305-0718.

He also wrote columns for the Indian Express.

== Awards ==
- Kinloch Forbes Gold Medal in Roman Law and Jurisprudence, 1952
- Padma Vibhushan, March 2002
- Justice K. S. Hegde Foundation Award, April 2006
