= EPLDT Ventus =

Telecommunications provider

ePLDT Ventus
- Company type: Public under ePLDT (NYSE: PHI)
- Industry: Business Process Outsourcing; Customer Relationship Management; Customer Interaction Services; Call Center Consulting
- Founded: 2001
- Headquarters: Makati, Philippines
- Number of locations: operating in 8 locations
- Area served: Philippines
- Key people: Maulik Parekh; President & CEO SPi Global; Tim Hardin; SVP Operations ePLDT Ventus

ePLDT Ventus, Inc., now rebranded as SPi CRM, is a subsidiary of the Philippine Long Distance Telephone Company (PLDT), a telecommunications provider in the Philippines. ePLDT Ventus operates eight customer contact centers across the Philippines.

Corporate Overview
Founded in 2001, The company employs more than 7,000 staff and personnel. Recently, it signed a contract with the Philippine Airlines (PAL) to handle its contact center services.
