= Beth Jacob High School of Denver =

Jewish high school in Colorado, US

Coordinates: 39°44′18″N 105°03′09″W

Location
- 5100 W 14th Ave, Denver, CO 80204

Information
- Other name: Bais Yaakov Denver
- Type: Private
- Religious affiliation: Jewish
- Denomination: Ultra Orthodox
- Established: 1968
- CEEB code: 060386
- NCES School ID: 00209206
- Dean: Rabbi Myer Judah Schwab
- Principal of Judaic Studies: Bruria Schwab
- Principal of General Studies: Esther Melamed
- Associate Dean: Rabbi Aron Yehuda Schwab
- Teaching staff: 13
- Gender: All Girls
- Enrollment: 48 (2017-2018)
- Student to teacher ratio: 3.7:1
- Website: bjhs.org

Beth Jacob High School of Denver, is an all-girls Bais Yaakov-style Orthodox Jewish high school in Denver, Colorado. The school is accredited by Cognia, and affiliated with Torah Umesora and College Board. The school has a student government, a publication; Batya Newsletter, and Choir, Dance, and Drama Groups. The judaics curriculum includes Chumash, Navi, Jewish studies, Jewish Law, History, and Home. During the summer the school runs a camp, Camp Bais Yaakov of the Rockies. The school is a part of the Denver West Side Jewish community.

== History ==
When the school first opened in 1968, a year after the local orthodox boys' yeshiva; Yeshiva Toras Chaim, it had a 9th and 10th grade, with an 11th grade opening the following year, tripling the student body. Most students were local, with around 18 coming from out of town and boarding with local families at the time. In 1971, the graduating class consisted of eight students.

== Leadership ==
Beth Jacob has been led by Rabbi Myer J. Schwab since its founding.
