= Denver Academy of Torah =

Coordinates: 39.7120°N 104.9092°W

Location
- 6825 E Alameda Ave Denver, CO 80224-1363

Information
- Established: 1993
- NCES School ID: A0500805
- Head of School: Abba Brodt
- Judaic Studies Principal: Aviad Bodner
- Teaching staff: 22
- Gender: Co-ed
- Enrollment: 162 (2021-2022)
- Student to teacher ratio: 7:1
- Language: English, Hebrew
- Athletics: Yes
- Mascot: Wolves

Denver Academy of Torah (DAT) is a K-12 Modern Orthodox Jewish day school in Denver, Colorado. Established in 1993, the school serves kindergarten through 12th grade, all at the DAT Campus on E Alameda. Sixty percent of students receive tuition assistance from the school. The school is affiliated with Prizmah: Center for Jewish Day Schools. Athletics include basketball, soccer, and volleyball. In 2024 the school celebrated its 30th anniversary and announced Abba Brodt as its new Head of School.
