= West Colfax, Denver =

Neighborhood of Denver, Colorado

Coordinates: 39.7403°N 105.0393°W

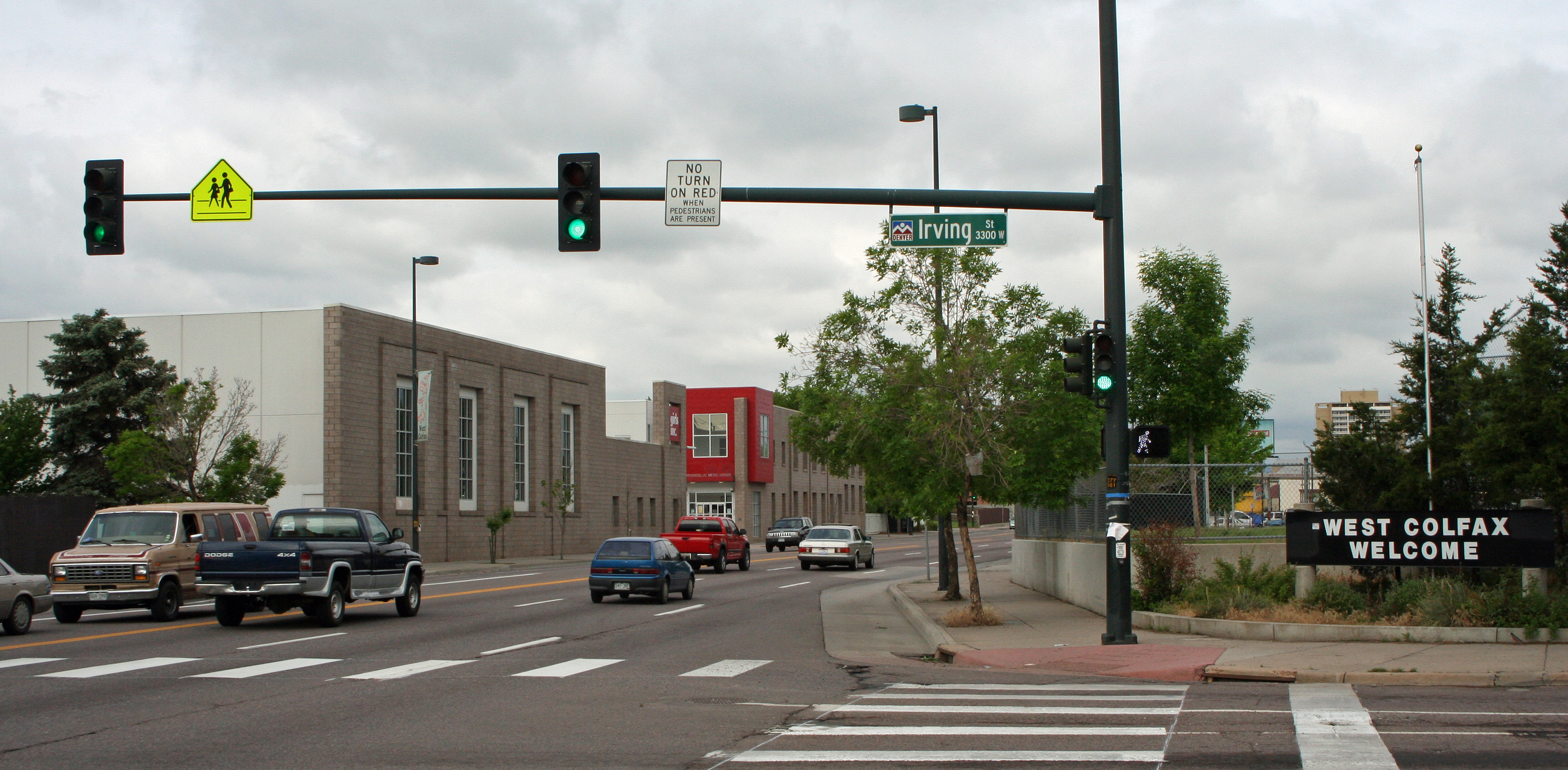
A view of West Colfax Avenue and the West Colfax Neighborhood.

West Colfax is a neighborhood of Denver, Colorado. The neighborhood is located in the West Denver area. In 2015 the population of the neighborhood was 9,120, and there were 4,055 housing units.

== Boundaries ==
The neighborhood is bordered on the west by Sheridan Boulevard, which is also the border with Jefferson County and the town of Lakewood, on the north by 17th and 19th avenues, on the east by Federal Boulevard, and on the south by Lakewood Gulch.

== Landmarks ==
The neighborhood takes its name from West Colfax Avenue, which is the busiest street in the neighborhood and which runs east and west through it. The neighborhood contains many single-family homes, condos, and businesses. Sloan's Lake is not in the neighborhood, but it is just north of its northern border.

St. Anthony Central Hospital had been located in the neighborhood since 1892. In 2011, the hospital moved to a new location in Lakewood. The old hospital site in West Colfax was demolished in 2013 and is being redeveloped into various mixed-use and residential developments.

Being the home of Denver's West Side Jewish Community, the oldest Jewish community in Denver, much of the West Colfax neighborhood lies within an eruv.

== History ==
Named for U.S. Vice President Schuyler Colfax and incorporated in 1891 with a population of around 300, the Town of Colfax was its own municipality. Golden Avenue was the town's main street, so named as it was the link between Denver and Golden. It was renamed Colfax Avenue in 1896. In 1897 the Town of Colfax was annexed by the City of Denver.

In the early 1900s the area that is now known as West Colfax was sparsely populated with several mansions and scattered squatter's shacks. During this time West Colfax was known as "No Man's Land" and "Jim's Town".

In the late 19th and early 20th centuries a large wave of Jewish immigrants from Eastern Europe moved into the West Colfax area. These immigrants turned "No Man's Land" into Denver's version of a European neighborhood.

During this time, West Colfax Avenue was lined with two-story brick commercial buildings, saloons, stores, a hotel, and a restaurant. West Colfax Avenue had a constant flow of hay wagons and peddlers that came from the agriculture communities of Golden and Morrison en route to Denver.

In the 1920s Colfax Elementary and Lake Junior High School were built to accommodate the growing neighborhood. During the Great Depression the neighborhood saw little to no development until the 1940s and 1950s when a housing boom occurred along with the Barnum and Sloan's Lake areas.

A wave of Latinos immigrated to the neighborhood in the 1960s. Young Anglo families immigrated to the neighborhood in the 1970s, and in the mid 1970s a wave of Southeast Asians immigrated into the area. Today, West Colfax is a diverse neighborhood made up of Anglo, Jews, African American, Latino, Native American, and Southeast Asian residents

The Average Price per Square Foot for a home in West Colfax was $333.00 in June 2017.

== See also ==
- Bibliography of Colorado
- Geography of Colorado
- History of Colorado
- Index of Colorado-related articles
- List of Colorado-related lists
  - List of neighborhoods in Denver
  - List of populated places in Colorado
- Outline of Colorado
