= Hillel Academy of Denver =

Address
- 450 S Hudson St Denver, CO 80246

Information
- Other names: Hillel Denver, Hillel Academy
- School type: Private
- Religious affiliation(s): Jewish
- Denomination: Ultra Orthodox
- Established: 1953
- NCES School ID: 00209181
- Teaching staff: 41
- Grades: K - 8
- Nursery years taught: PK
- Gender: Coed
- Enrollment: 272 (2017-2018)
- Student to teacher ratio: 6.5:1
- Website: hillelacademyofdenver.com

Hillel Academy of Denver is an Orthodox Jewish day school in Denver Colorado, serving PreK-8th grade and founded in 1953. The school is affiliated with Torah Umesorah, the National council of Orthodox Jewish Day schools. It is accredited by Cognia since 2000. Rabbi Yisroel Goldbaum has been the principal since 2016.

== History ==
Morris Hagler was the inaugural president of the school. According to "The Shmoos column" of the Intermountain Jewish News, leaders of the proposed day school were urged to change its name from Hillel Academy to avoid a conflict with the Hillel Foundation

Later the paper published the names of the first two teachers, Miriam Wade teaching Hebrew and Judaics and Elsie Adams teaching secular studies. The first two years of operation were held in space provided by Beth HaMedrosh Hagodol-Beth Joseph (BMH-BJ).

The school started as kindergarten and 1st grade and 27 students total. General subjects were taught in the morning, using the Denver Public School curriculum, and Hebrew and Judaic Studies in the afternoon.

The school was one of 10 Jewish day school's opened that year.

In 1954, the school ran ad's in the Intermountain Jewish News, referring to itself as the "Only All-Day Jewish Day School in the Rocky Mountain Area".

A decade later in 1965, Sheldon Beren served as the school's chairman, and Manny Feder as president, enrollment that year was 200 students.

On Sunday, January 22, 2012, the school celebrated its 60th anniversary, had an enrollment of 241 and Rabbi Yitzchok Goldstein served as principle.
