= Zia Mody =

Indian lawyer

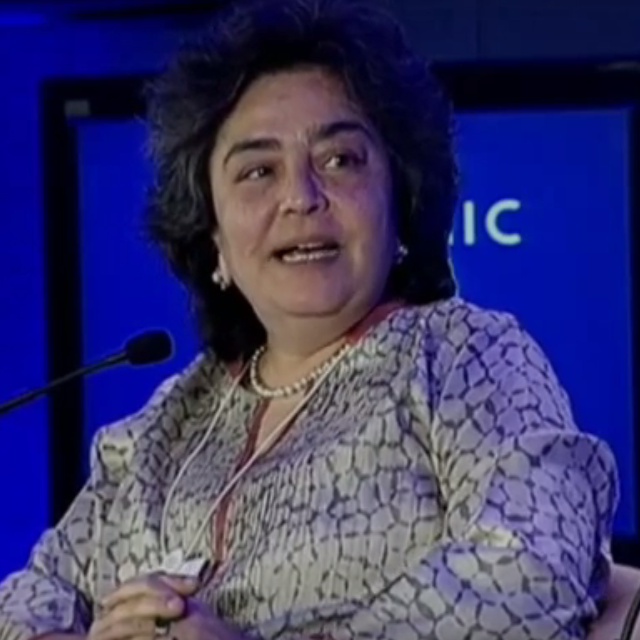
- Mody at the World Economic Forum
- Born: 19 July 1956 (age 70); Mumbai, Maharashtra, India
- Education: University of Cambridge; Harvard Law School
- Occupation: Corporate lawyer
- Organization(s): AZB & Partners (Founder & Managing Partner)
- Spouse: Jaydev Mody (Chairman of Delta Corp)
- Father: Soli Sorabjee
- Relatives: Hormazd Sorabjee (editor at Autocar)

Zia Jaydev Mody (born 19 July 1956) is an Indian corporate lawyer and businesswoman. Zia is one of the founding partners of AZB & Partners, a premier Indian law firm. She advises large private equity houses such as KKR, Bain Capital, and Warburg Pincus.

== Early life and education ==
Zia is a follower of the Baháʼí faith, and was born to parents of Zoroastrian descent, mother Zena Sorabjee and father Soli Sorabjee, a former Attorney General of India. Mody's initial education was at Elphinstone College, Mumbai. She studied law at Selwyn College, Cambridge, in 1978 and was enrolled as an Advocate with the Bar Council of Maharashtra & Goa in 1978. She earned a master's degree from Harvard Law School.

== Career ==
After completing a masters from law school, she later was admitted as a member of the New York State Bar in 1980. She practices law in India and the United States. She worked for five years with Baker McKenzie in New York City before returning to India. She founded her own practice, Chambers of Zia Mody, in Mumbai in 1984 and practiced as counsel in the Indian courts for over a decade. She later merged her practice with other firms to form AZB & Partners.

== Personal life ==
She has three younger brothers, Jehangir, Jamshed, and Hormazd. Her husband, Jaydev Mody, is an influential businessman who serves as chairman of the casino company Delta Corp. They live in Mumbai, Maharashtra, and have three daughters, Anjali, Aarti, and Aditi.

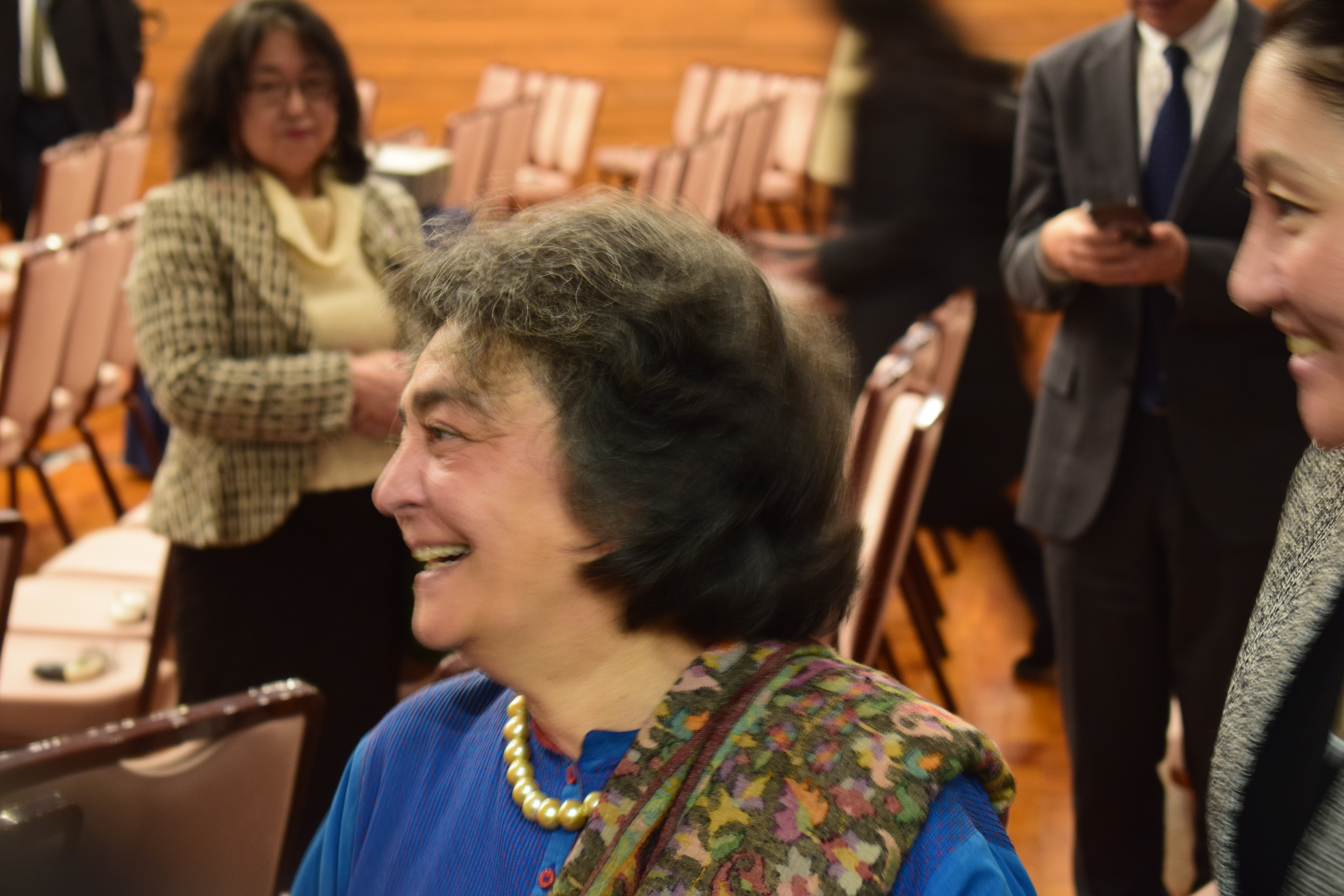
Zia Mody in Japan

== Memberships and affiliations ==
She is an Independent Director (2018–present), Member of Audit & Risk Committee (2018–present), and Member of Investment Committee (2019–present) of Ascendas Property Fund Trustee Pte. Ltd.

She has been or is a member of the Reserve Bank of India (2012), the Confederation of Indian Industry National Council (2015–present), the Committee on Corporate Governance formed by SEBI (2017), and Maharashtra's Economic Advisory Council (2023). She was the Vice President and member of the London Court of International Arbitration (2010–2013).

== Charitable work ==
She has contributed to the Jai Vakeel Foundation and the Bahá'í fund.

== In the Media ==
She was ranked No. 1 in Fortune India's 50 Most Powerful Women in Business list in 2018 and 2019.
