= Outsourcing of animation =

Economic phenomenon

Outsourcing of animation has become widespread. Starting in the late 1950s, the animation for many low-budget American animated productions has been done by animation studios in foreign countries such as Japan, South Korea, Taiwan, China, Canada, Mexico, Spain, Argentina, Australia, the Philippines, India, and France. This is done to reduce the cost of animation production.

One of the earliest known examples of animation outsourcing in the United States was carried out by Jay Ward Productions for The Adventures of Rocky and Bullwinkle and Friends. Though initially envisioned as a Japanese co-production, animation for the series was done by Mexican animation studio Gamma Productions from 1959 to 1964. During the 1960s, Rankin/Bass Productions adopted similar practices. Their stop-motion Animagic productions were headed by Japanese stop-motion animator Tadahito Mochinaga at his studio, MOM Production. Nearly all of the Rankin/Bass' traditional animation was outsourced to at least five Japanese animation companies: MOM Production, Toei Animation, TCJ (Television Corporation of Japan), Mushi Production and Topcraft. Hanna-Barbera was another early example of animation outsourcing; In 1978, Taiwan's Wang Film Productions (originally known as Cuckoo's Nest Studio) was founded as an overseas facility for the studio. In 1988, Hanna-Barbera also started a subsidiary in the Philippines, Fil-Cartoons.

Major companies such as The Walt Disney Company and IMAX, are beginning to outsource an increasing amount of their animation production to Asian countries, particularly India, while other companies are outsourcing animation from India for commercials and computer games. A number of animation companies in the country are also creating skilled manpower for the animation market through various training programs.

Overall though, the main reason why foreign entertainment firms are flocking to India is the cost advantage the country offers. As an example, American animators can cost about $125 an hour; in India, they cost $25 an hour. The total cost for making a full-length animated film in America is estimated to be $100 million to $175 million. In India, it can be made for $15 million to $25 million. Studios in India are also able to provide a large supply of low-cost, high-quality software engineers, even going so far as to establish studios outfitted with state-of-the-art hardware and software to carry out production overseas.

The Walt Disney Company has outsourced a number of major animation projects to studios throughout India. Cable and satellite station Cartoon Network is buying animation films made in South Korea while MTV has added India to its outsourcing center along with the Philippines and South Korea. Applied Gravity, a multimedia company in New Zealand, has outsourced almost 90% of its animation work to Satyam Computer Services’ business process outsourcing subsidiary, Nipuna Services. An animatronics dog for the Discovery Channel’s Animal Planet from popular episode called “K9 to11” and animatronics models for New Zealand theme parks were some of the best-known creations of Applied Gravity in India.
