= TTEC =

American call center company

TTEC Holdings, Inc.
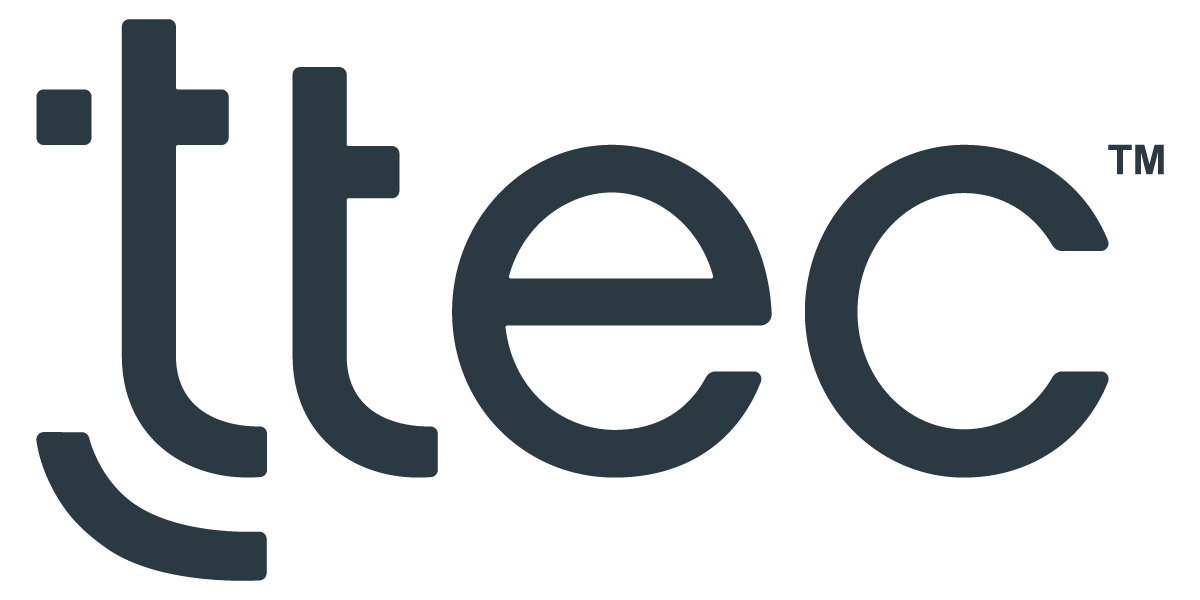

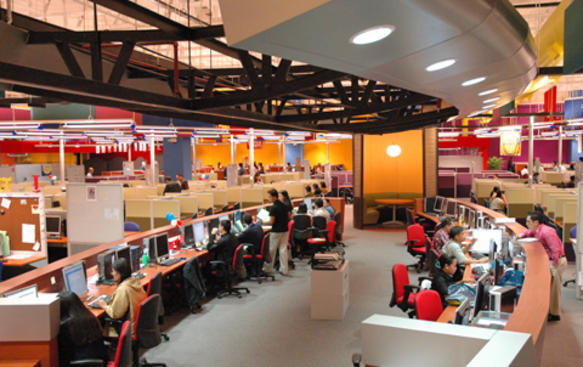
- A production floor in the Philippines
- Formerly: TeleTech Holdings, Inc.
- Type: Public
- Traded as: Nasdaq: TTEC; S&P 600 Component
- ISIN: US89854H1023
- Industry: Customer experience technology, business process outsourcing, offshore outsourcing
- Incorporated: Texas
- Founded: 1982; 44 years ago
- Founder: Kenneth D. Tuchman
- Headquarters: United States
- Number of locations: 21 countries
- Area served: Multi-national
- Key people: Kenneth D. Tuchman (CEO)
- Revenue: ▼2.137 billion USD (2025)
- Net income: ▲ −192 million USD (2025)
- Number of employees: 60,000
- Website: ttec.com

TTEC Holdings, Inc. (formerly named TeleTech), is an American customer experience technology and services company with its primary place of business in Austin, Texas.

Kenneth D. Tuchman is the founder, chairman and CEO.

== History ==
=== Founding and early developments (1982–1996) ===
The company was founded in 1982 by Kenneth D. Tuchman under the name TeleTech Holdings, Inc. In 1986, the company moved to Sherman Oaks, California.

By 1995, it had added call centers in other states. In 1996, it completed its IPO.

=== International growth and recent development (since 1997) ===
After the completion of its IPO, global operations begin. In 1998, the company expanded to Scotland, Canada, Argentina and Brazil. Three years later, the expansion continued and centers were opened in the Philippines. In 2006, TeleTech acquired Direct Alliance.

In 2010, TeleTech acquired an 80 percent stake in the management consulting firm Peppers & Rogers Group. The same year, the company expanded into the Middle East. Four years later, it grew its presence in Europe by starting operations in Sofia, Bulgaria.

In 2024, the company sold its headquarters in Englewood, Colorado, designating Austin, Texas, as its new head office in 2025.

In 2026 the company decided to slash 401k retirement benefits for its employees and redirect those funds towards AI initiatives.

== Acquisitions ==
In recent years, TTEC has grown its business through a variety of acquisitions, including:

- 2011: eLoyalty Corporation (integrated contact services business unit)
- 2012: iKnowtion
- 2012: Guidon Performance Solutions
- 2013: Technology Solutions Group, Inc.
- 2014: Sofica
- 2014: rogenSi
- 2016: Atelka
- 2017: Motif India infotech
- 2017: Connextions
- 2020: VoiceFoundry
- 2021: Avtex
- 2022: Faneuil

== Products and services ==
TTEC is organized into two primary business segments: TTEC Digital and TTEC Engage.

In 2022, TTEC provided services in 21 countries: the United States of America, Australia, Belgium, Brazil, Bulgaria, Canada, Colombia, Costa Rica, Germany, Greece, India, Ireland, Mexico, the Netherlands, New Zealand, the Philippines, Poland, Singapore, South Africa, Thailand, and the United Kingdom.

== Awards and recognition ==
- 2021: Forbes names TTEC one of the World's Top Female Friendly Companies
