= Yeshiva Toras Chaim =

All-male Talmudic academy in Colorado, US

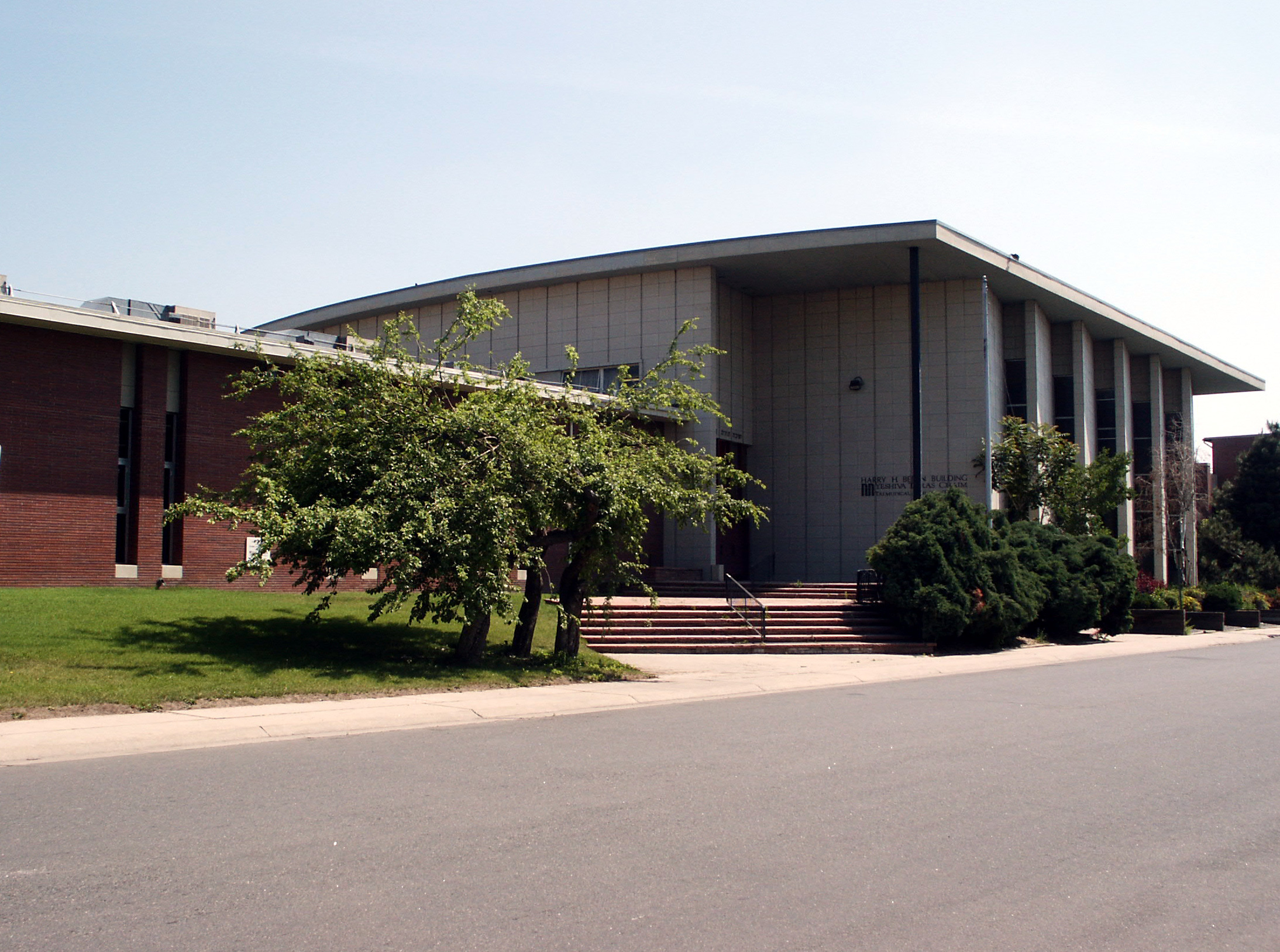

Location
- Denver, Colorado 80219; 39°44′31″N 105°02′36″W

Information
- School type: Private Yeshiva Yeshiva
- Religious affiliation: Jewish
- Denomination: Ultra Orthodox
- Established: 1967
- CEEB code: 060462
- NCES School ID: 00209192
- President: Rabbi Ahron Y. Wasserman
- Roshei HaYeshiva: Rabbi Yisroel Meir Kagan, Rabbi Yitzchok Wasserman
- Director of Operations: Rabbi Chaim Abrams
- Grades: 6-12
- Gender: Male
- Enrollment: 64
- Student to teacher ratio: 6:1
- Website: https://ytcdenver.org/

Yeshiva Toras Chaim (YTC) is an all-male, Lithuanian (Litvish)-style Talmudic academy in the West Colfax neighborhood of Denver, Colorado. YTC was founded in Denver in 1967 by rabbis Yisroel Meir Kagan, and Yitzchok Wasserman. Rabbis Dovid Nussbaum and Yaakov Kamenetsky took over leadership in 2025. The student body is multi-state, including students from the across the US. The school is a part of the Denver West Side Jewish community.

== History ==
The yeshiva opened in the fall of 1967.

It was described by a local newspaper as "the only yeshiva between Chicago and the West Coast") and the students were initially mainly from Denver and other western cities, with some from New York City, New Jersey, Baltimore and other east coast communities.

== Academics ==
The yeshiva provides a full high school program (grades 9–12), a bais-medrash undergraduate program for post-high school bochurim or students, and a chabura or religious study group for married men (kollel yungeleit). Students lodge in the yeshiva's dormitory facilities, connected to the main yeshiva building.

== Refusal of federal funds ==
The yeshiva is one of less than fifty private schools in the US that offer college-level education—out of a total of more than 2600—that refuse to accept federal funds (so-called Title IV financial aid, from the Higher Education Act of 1965). Most if not all other such schools are conservative Christian colleges. By rejecting federal funding, which includes financial aid for students, the yeshiva is not required to adhere to federal guidelines other universities do, including guidelines related to discrimination, investigations of accusations of sexual abuse, and the reporting of on-campus crimes.

In particular, "can get exemptions if they can show they are controlled by religious organizations with whose beliefs Title IX requirements conflict."
