= AZB & Partners =

Indian corporate law firm

- Type: Partnership Firm (90+ partners)
- Industry: Law Practice
- Founded: 2004; 22 years ago
- Number of locations: 6
- Key people: Zia Mody (Founder & Managing Partner); Bahram Vakil (Founder & Managing Partner); Ajay Bahl (Founder & Managing Partner)
- Number of employees: 500+
- Website: www.azbpartners.com

AZB & Partners is a corporate law firm in India, with offices in Mumbai, Delhi NCR, Bangalore, Chennai and Pune. The firm comprises over 150 partners specialising in General Corporate, M&A and Banking and Finance practice and other specialised verticals such as dispute resolution, real estate, competition law, intellectual property, capital markets, compliance & investigations, funds, employment law, etc. AZB & Partners' domestic and international clients range from privately owned to publicly listed companies, including Fortune 500 entities, multinationals, investment banks and private equity firms.

== History ==
Zia Mody, an alumnus of Cambridge University and Harvard Law School who had worked with Baker & McKenzie in New York City established her own Litigation practice in Mumbai as the sole proprietor of the Chambers of Zia Mody. She had been friends with Bahram Vakil, a graduate of Columbia University who also practiced for 2 years in the United States before returning to India and working as a partner at Little & Co.. The two chose to partner and established CZB (Chambers of Zia and Bahram). Ajay Bahl started his career as a Chartered Accountant but was persuaded by N.K.P Salve to study law and intern with prominent lawyer Soli Sorabjee (Zia's father), after which Ajay set up his own practice in New Delhi.

AZB & Partners was formed in 2004 when CZB & Partners in Mumbai merged with Ajay Bahl & Company in Delhi. The firm has moved away from the traditional family-style set-up, however, and has a clear partnership track in place, which has led it to be credited for the modernity of its practice. The firm entered into a "best friends agreement" with UK-based Clifford Chance in early 2009, which was terminated by mutual agreement in January 2011.

== Locations ==
The Firm has a total of 7 offices in India: Two each in Mumbai and Delhi NCR and one each in Bangalore, Chennai and Pune.

== Practice Areas ==
The major practice areas of the Firm include:

- Mergers & Acquisitions
- Joint Ventures & General Corporate
- Private Equity & Funds
- Banking & Finance
- Real Estate
- Insurance
- Competition
- Dispute Resolution
- Capital Markets
- Employment
- Compliance & Investigation
- Tax
- Technology, Media & Telecommunication
- Intellectual Property
- Projects & Energy
- Funds
- Private Client Practice

== Partners ==
The firm has more than 150 partners.

== Awards ==
AZB & Partners has received wide national and international acclaim within the legal sphere, some of which include 'Ranked No.1' by RSG Top 40 India law firm ranking in 2019 and 2017, 'Best Overall Law Firm of the Year- 2017' at India Business Law Journal's Indian Law Firms Awards, 2017–18, 'Law Firm of the Year- 2017' by VC Circle (topping the tables in both deal count and volume) 'Client Service Law Firm of the Year - 2017' by Chambers and Partners Asia-Pacific Awards. For the first quarter of 2018, the firm was ranked on top in both M&A deal count and volume on the league tables published by Merger Market, Bloomberg and Thomson Reuters. In May 2024, AZB & Partners was recognized as the "Best Overall Law Firm" category at the India Business Law Journal's Indian Law Firm Awards 2024.
