= Kenneth D. Tuchman =

American entrepreneur & philanthropist (born 1959)

- Born: 1959 (age 66–67); California, US
- Occupation: Businessman
- Known for: Founder, chairman and CEO of TTEC (formerly TeleTech)
- Spouse: Debra Mautner
- Children: 2

Kenneth Darryl Tuchman (born October 23, 1959) is an American entrepreneur who is the founder, chairman, and chief executive officer of the outsourcing company TTEC, formerly known as TeleTech.

== Biography ==
=== Career ===
Born in California in 1959, Tuchman worked various jobs as a teenager, including operating an automotive lot that evolved into his first business venture. He later worked in his father’s construction business in California, where he developed the idea for a centralized customer service platform.

=== TeleTech ===
In 1982, he founded TeleTech in Los Angeles. Following the breakup of AT&T in 1984, TeleTech was hired to monitor customer transitions, which preceded further contracts with MCI, Inc. and United Telecom (subsequently Sprint Corporation).

By 1995, the company reported $50 million in revenue and relocated its headquarters to Denver, Colorado. That year, investor Sam Zell acquired a 17% stake in the company, and in 1996, it completed an initial public offering on NASDAQ.

=== TTEC ===
Tuchman briefly left the company in 1999 but returned as CEO in 2001 to lead a restructuring. On January 9, 2018, TeleTech officially changed its name to TTEC.

In 2025, TTEC had operations in 70 global locations.

== Philanthropy ==
=== Tuchman Family Foundation ===
In 1996, Tuchman and his wife, Debra, co-founded the nonprofit Tuchman Family Foundation, which supports innovations in education, medical research, environmental sustainability, and social equity, according to the foundation website.

The foundation’s philanthropic efforts have included donating “Supplies For Success” to public school districts serving predominantly low-income families and funding the $110,000 transformation of a school bus into a food truck/mobile teaching kitchen for high school students at Cherry Creek School District’s Innovation Campus in Colorado.

During the COVID-19 pandemic, Tuchman and the Tuchman Family Foundation provided more than 50,000 meals to frontline healthcare workers.

Tuchman’s foundation has also contributed to medical treatment and research organizations such as National Jewish Health, which named its pulmonary care division in the Tuchman family’s honor. Tuchman's wife Debra has served on its board of directors since 2003.

=== TTEC Foundation ===
In 2007, Tuchman launched the TeleTech Community Foundation, later renamed the TTEC Foundation, an employee-driven nonprofit that supports charitable initiatives in communities where TTEC operates. The foundation awards grants to nonprofit organizations across the globe that support educational growth for students of greatest need.

In 2024 the TTEC Foundation donated $325,000 to education-related organizations in the Bulgaria, Canada, Honduras, India, Mexico, the Philippines, South Africa, and the United States.

=== Honors ===
In 2016, the Colorado I Have a Dream Foundation presented Tuchman with a Dream Maker Award, recognizing him as “a community leader whose commitment to quality education has had an enduring impact on area youth."

In 2022, he was named one of the Denver Business Journal’s “Most Admired CEOs.”

== Personal life ==
Tuchman is married to Debra Mautner. They have two children.
