= Knowledge process outsourcing =

Outsourcing of core information-related business activities

Knowledge process outsourcing (KPO) describes the outsourcing of core information-related business activities which are competitively important or form an integral part of a company's value chain. KPO requires advanced analytical and technical skills as well as a high degree of specialist expertise.

Reasons behind KPO include an increase in specialized knowledge and expertise, additional value creation, the potential for cost reductions, and a shortage of skilled labor. KPO is a continuation of business process outsourcing, yet with rather more of business complexity. To be successful in knowledge process outsourcing, a lot of guide is required from interorganizational system.

== Types ==
KPO services include all kinds of research and information gathering, e.g., intellectual property research for patent applications; equity research, business and market research, legal and medical services; training, consultancy, and research and development in fields such as pharmaceuticals and biotechnology; and animation and design, etc.

== Importance ==
he increasing competition has contributed to decreasing time-to-market cycles and has made customers more stringent about the quality of the product or service. This has compelled businesses to increase the efficiency of operations and enhance the value of the products or services. This has allowed businesses to introduce products in a quick manner and make a faster entry into the market, without having the complexities associated with handling human resources.

Businesses may use knowledge process outsourcing providers to analyze data, research and information for specific business functions, including decision support, market research, legal services, financial analysis and technical analysis.

== Risks and benefits ==
Benefits

- Lower operating costs
- Access to specialist skills or expertise
- Increased flexibility in staffing and resource management
- Ability to focus internal resources on core business activities

Risks

- Potential loss of control over sensitive or confidential information
- Difficulty retaining key talent or knowledge
- Quality-control issues
- Communication challenges caused by legal, cultural, language or time-zone differences
- Risks to intellectual property protection

== Differentiation from BPO ==
A KPO firm requires considerably more skilled personnel than a BPO firm. Experts working in KPO keep on learning and accomplished professionals can power their aptitude to produce more income for the KPO firm. The main difference between a KPO firm and a BPO firm is that in a KPO firm, the customer is included amid the whole execution process.

== Origin of the term ==
Ashish Gupta, ex-COO of Evalueserve and co-founder & CEO of Benori Knowledge has often been credited with coining the term. Gupta, an alumnus of the Indian Institute of Technology Delhi, is also a Founder & Trustee of Ashoka University and Plaksha University, and serves on the boards of various companies. Published authors have credited him for coining the term in their works.

== In India ==
The Indian National Association of Software and Service Companies (NASSCOM) estimated the total market size of the KPO sector in India in 2006 to be $1.5 billion. The year before, 2005, it had been $1.3 billion, with Evalueserve predicting that by 2010 it would be some $10 to $15 billion. The Indian government was predicting that by 2010 India would have 15% of the global KPO market. However, the global financial crisis, coupled with domestic economic problems such as the IPO of Reliance Power in 2009, caused people to re-evaluate these predictions, incurring worries that India's IT, BPO, and KPO sectors — which by then, combined, were $8.4 billion in export revenues — would be greatly affected by these factors. The worldwide KPO industry is expected to reach about US $17 billion by 2015, of which US $12 billion would be outsourced to India. Furthermore, the Indian KPO area is likewise anticipated that it will utilize more than 2, 50,000 KPO experts by 2015.

== In the Philippines ==
The Philippines Knowledge Process Outsourcing (KPO) services are often called "non-voice" or back office services, referring to activities outside contact center, customer and IT support services. In 2014, the KPO sector comprised 40 percent of the country's outsourcing industry. The Information Technology and Business Process Outsourcing Association of the Philippines (IBPAP) predicts that the Philippine outsourcing sector will reach $25 billion in revenues and employ about 1.3 million people by 2016.

The KPO industry is different from the BPO in the respect of that the former is more resilient to artificial intelligence (AI) and automation. With the 4th Industrial Revolution, it is estimated that most job losses will occur in low value-added contact center (“voice”) and other BPO services. Other services impacted by AI and automation include medical transcription, basic 2D animation services, parts of IT technical support and back-office transactions. Advanced functions that are projected to become more in demand include analytics and optimization engines, automation enablement, clinical data analytics, remote health management, Virtual Reality (VR)/Augmented Reality (AR)-enabled animation and supply chain optimization.

== See also ==
- Outsourcing
- Legal outsourcing
- Recruitment

== Sources ==
- Basu, Sudip Ranjan (2009). "The economic growth story in India: past, present, and prospects for the future". In Klein, Lawrence Robert (ed.). The making of national economic forecasts. Edward Elgar Publishing. ISBN 978-1-84720-489-9.
- Contractor, Farok J.; Kumar, Vikas; Kundu, Sumit K. (2010). Global Outsourcing and Offshoring: An Integrated Approach to Theory and Corporate Strategy. Cambridge University Press. ISBN 978-0-521-19353-5.
- Kaul, Vijay Kumar (2011). Business Organization and Management: Text and Cases. Pearson India. ISBN 9788131754498.
- Mehrotra, Nitin (2005). Business Process Outsourcing — The Indian Experience. ICFAI books. ISBN 978-81-7881-576-3.
- Sornarajah, Muthucumaraswamy; Wang, Jiangyu (2010). China, India and the International Economic Order. Cambridge University Press. ISBN 978-0-521-11057-0.
- Varadarajan, Latha (2010). The Domestic Abroad: Diasporas in International Relations. Oxford University Press. ISBN 978-0-19-988987-7.
