= Call centre industry in Bangladesh =

The call centre industry in Bangladesh was worth around $12 million in 2013, of which 50 per cent was accounted for by the country's domestic market. In 2013, national mobile operators Airtel and Citycell outsourced their call centres to local companies. Bangladesh Telecommunication Regulatory Commission (BTRC) eased the licensing process for call centres in 2013.

A call centre "village" was planned in 2009. As of 2013, around 70 call centres were in operation in Bangladesh. Bangladesh exports its call centre services to countries including the United States, Canada and the United Kingdom.
