= Business process outsourcing =

Form of outsourcing

Business process outsourcing (BPO) is a subset of outsourcing in which a company contracts the operations and responsibilities of a specific business process to a third-party service provider.

BPO offers organizations significant advantages, including increased flexibility, cost efficiency, and a sharper focus on core competencies. By transforming fixed costs into variable costs, companies can accelerate business processes and leverage specialized expertise from third-party providers. Challenges also arise from unclear contracts, changing requirements, unmet service levels, and over-dependence on providers.

== Types ==
BPO originated with manufacturing firms, such as Coca-Cola outsourcing parts of their supply chain. BPO can involve back office functions like human resources, finance, and accounting, or front office functions such as contact centre services. Some BPO services are information technology-based, referred to as ITES (Information Technology Enabled Service). Knowledge process outsourcing (KPO) and legal process outsourcing (LPO) are sub-segments.

International BPO is termed offshore outsourcing, while regional contracts are called nearshore outsourcing.

=== Retail outsourcing ===
Retail outsourcing is a form of business process outsourcing practiced in retail, logistic and restaurant business. It involves the contracting of the operations and responsibilities of transportation, cooking, customer servicing or settlement of accounts business processes to a third-party service provider. Such provider bears the ultimate responsibility for the proper execution of the designated functions at stores, warehouses or catering facilities. The service supplier carries out the internal (back office) and front office duties including recruiting, training and legalizing human resources, tracking their job conduct, reporting and solving the problems, performing daily production tasks. Retail outsourcing is typically contracted for operational segments requiring large amounts of unskilled work force in such spheres as shipment, cash desk processing, counter servicing, bread baking, meat and fish cutting, cleaning, dish washing, packing, boxing or bundling.

Initially, the concept of retail outsourcing has been conceived in Russia. It has fully matured by the end of the 2000s. Currently, retail outsourcing is practiced by all major Russian retailers. It accounts for more than 25% of their total business operations. Even the abolition of the contingent labor (2016) failed to impact these services significantly. It only put a ban on specific segments (primarily, cash desk processing) but left other parts almost intact.

== Industry size ==
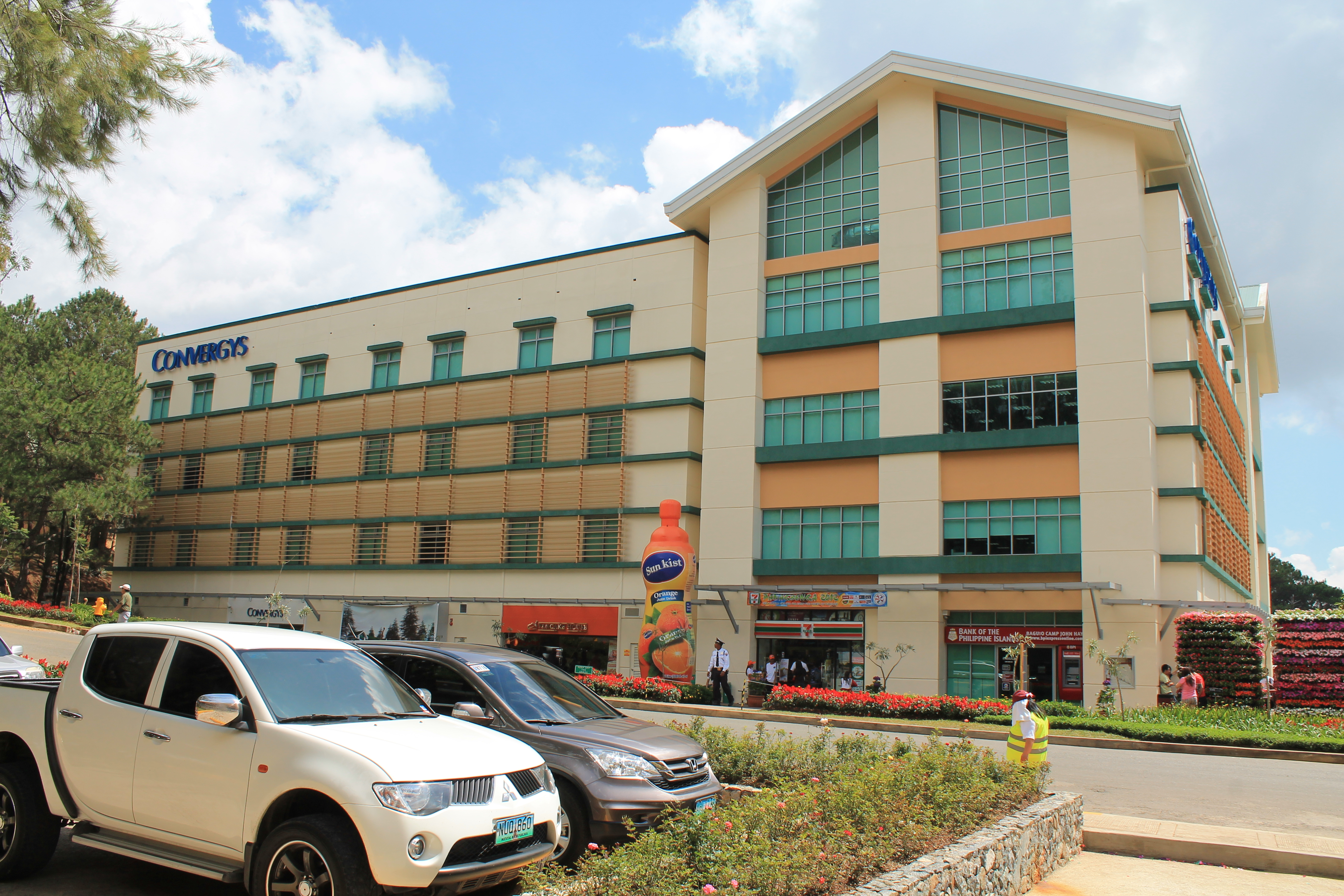
Convergys call center in Baguio, Philippines

The global Business Process Outsourcing (BPO) market has experienced significant growh, with projections indicating continued expansion in the coming years. The global BPO market was valued at approximately USD 302.62 billion in 2024 and is projected to reach USD 328.37 billion in 2025, growing at a compound annual growth rate (CAGR) of 9.8% from 2025 to 2030, reaching USD 525.23 billion.

== By country ==
=== China ===
China's BPO market was valued at USD 19.68 billion in 2024 and is anticipated to grow at a CAGR of 12.0% from 2025 to 2030, reaching USD 38.38 billion. China's BPO industry is primarily focused on domestic outsourcing, serving local businesses rather than international clients.

=== India ===
India's BPO services market was valued at USD 49.87 billion in 2024 and is expected to reach USD 139.35 billion by 2033, growing at a CAGR of 12.5%.

=== Philippines ===
The Philippines is a major global BPO hub, with the industry generating USD 38.7 billion in 2024. Filipino workers’ English proficiency and familiarity with Western culture are key factors in the country’s success in serving international clients.

== See also ==
- Call centre industry in Bangladesh
- Call centre industry in India
- Call center industry in the Philippines
