= List of fellows of the Royal Society (health and human sciences) =

This article lists fellows of the Royal Society in health and human sciences.

== Clinical endocrinology ==
Name	Year elected	Institution
Stafford Lightman	2017	Henry Wellcome Laboratories
Daniel J. Drucker	2015	Lunenfeld-Tanenbaum Research Institute, Mount Sinai Hospital
Rajesh Thakker	2014	
Andrew Hattersley	2010	
Michel Chrétien	2009	
Graham Russell	2008	The Botnar Research Centre
Stephen O'Rahilly	2003	
Peter Gluckman	2001	

== Clinical epidemiology ==
Name	Year Elected	Institution
Richard Houlston	2017	
Jack Cuzick	2016	Queen Mary University of London
Rory Collins	2015	Nuffield Department of Population Health
Christopher Dye	2012	World Health Organization
Valerie Beral	2006	
Nicholas Wald	2004	
Gordon Conway	2004	
Brian Greenwood	1998	
Thomas Meade	1996	
Martin Vessey	1991	

== Clinical pathology ==
Name	Year elected	Institution
Richard Houlston	2017	
David C. Rubinsztein	2017	
Patrick Vallance	2017	GlaxoSmithKline
Andrew Wilkie	2013	Weatherall Institute of Molecular Medicine, University of Oxford
Peter Isaacson	2009	University College London
Jack Martin	2000	University of Melbourne
George Poste	1997	

== Clinical pharmacology ==
Name	Year elected	Institution
Patrick Vallance	2017	GlaxoSmithKline
Paul Workman	2016	Institute of Cancer Research
Garret FitzGerald	2012	
Graham Russell	2008	The Botnar Research Centre
Peter Barnes	2007	Imperial College Faculty of Medicine
Nicholas White	2006	Mahidol University
Trevor Robbins	2005	University of Cambridge
Roderick Flower	2003	
Geoffrey Burnstock	1986	

== Clinical physiology ==
Name	Year elected	Institution
Rajesh Thakker	2014	
Andrew Hattersley	2010	
Nicholas White	2006	Mahidol University
Hugh Bostock	2001	
