= Willi Born =

German immunologist based in the US

- Born: 24 April 1952 (age 74); Frankfurt, Germany
- Education: Albert Ludwig University, Freiburg; Max Planck Institute of Immunobiology and Epigenetics (Ph.D)
- Known for: Research on gamma delta T cells
- Spouse: Rebecca L. O'Brien
- Scientific career
- Fields: Immunology
- Institutions: University of Texas Southwestern Medical Center; University of Colorado Anschutz; National Jewish Health

Willi Karel H. Born (born 24 April 1952) is a German immunologist based in the United States, best known for his research on gamma delta T cells. He currently is professor emeritus in the Department of Immunology and Genetic Medicine at National Jewish Health in Denver, CO.

== Biography ==
Born in Frankfurt, Germany, on 24 April, 1952, Willi K. Born grew up in Freiburg, Germany. During his graduate work in immunology, he investigated autoimmunity in alpha beta T cells. His dissertation focused on immunological autoreactivity. After earning his doctorate in immunology in 1982, he moved to the United States for immunological research. During his professional career, he studied gamma delta T cells, mainly in collaboration with fellow immunologist Rebecca L. O'Brien. In 1988, he and Rebecca were married. Together, they have two daughters.

== Education ==
Born completed both undergraduate and graduate studies at the Albert Ludwig University in Freiburg, Germany. He did research for his degrees at what was then the Max Planck Institute for Immunobiology, now the Max Planck Institute of Immunobiology and Epigenetics, under the guidance of Marie Luise Lohmann-Matthes, and Hartmut Wekerle, the latter whom he credits for eliciting his interest in T cells.

In 1982, he moved to the United States after graduation, first to Dallas, TX, for training in molecular genetics with Haley Tucker, and later to Denver, CO, for further studies on T cells and the then recently discovered alpha beta T cell receptor for antigen (TCR) with Philippa Marrack, and John Kappler.

== Career ==
In 1987, Born obtained his first faculty position at the University of Colorado. In 1989, Born and O'Brien formed a joint research group at National Jewish Health for studies on the newly discovered gamma delta T cells. There was substantial skepticism regarding these cells at the time. Born worked on increasing understanding about gamma delta T cells, and authored or co-authored approximately 200 scientific publications and educational reviews. Having retired in 2018, Born is an emeritus professor at National Jewish Health.

== Research Interests ==
Mentored by Philippa Marrack and trained by molecular biologist Ed Palmer, Born used hybridoma technology with the T cell fusion line BW5147 to analyze T cells developing in the fetal thymus and demonstrate the ordered progression of TCR gene rearrangements during T cell maturation.

Together with research technologist Janice White, he then modified the fusion line by disabling its endogenous alpha and beta TCR genes through radiation mutagenesis, facilitating further studies on T cell specificity.

Silencing endogenous TCR alpha in the fusion line also increased permissiveness for expression of another cell surface-expressed protein dimer, gamma delta, which had been proposed to be a second TCR. This was an unforeseen outcome. Taking advantage, Born produced gamma delta+ hybridomas with fetal thymocytes. Encouraged by John Kappler, he worked together with investigators in the department to purify the gamma delta heterodimer from one of these hybridomas and sequence fragments of both proteins. The protein sequences showed that a newly discovered TCR gene indeed encoded the delta chain, and they confirmed the TCR nature of the gamma delta heterodimer. These findings established gamma delta-expressing cells as a second type of T cell with variable, adaptive TCRs

Born and collaborator O'Brien then started a joint research group (BOB lab) to study the new T cells. Because of greater accessibility, the work was done in mice. Apart from the lymphoid tissues, BOB lab researchers investigated and compared gamma delta T cell populations in the skin, mammary gland, placenta, liver, lung and pancreas. They noted numerous connections between gamma delta T cells and other cells of the immune system such as B cells, alpha beta T cells including NKT cells, and dendritic cells, but also with trophoblasts.

Using gamma delta TCR+ hybridomas, they screened for specificity. In addition to finding anti-bacterial responses dependent on the gamma delta TCR, they reported specific recognition of diverse structurally defined molecules, both peptidic and non-peptidic. Hallmarks of stimulatory peptides identified in these early studies re-emerged in present-day efforts to vaccinate against SARS-CoV-2.

Gamma delta-TCR-dependent recognition of peptides did not require antigen presentation, unlike the antigen recognition by alpha beta T cells.

BOB lab investigators saw that gamma delta T cells in vivo were mainly engaged in regulation, in keeping with their small numbers in rodents. They found them to modulate inflammation, but also normal lymphocyte development. Collaborating with Sally Huber at the University of Vermont, they observed that the regulatory effect could be based on a balance between counter-reactive subsets of gamma delta T cells. Tipping this balance, they noted vast physiological changes, for example in airway function during allergic responses, with steady state circulating antibody levels, or with the pre-immune composition of B cell and alpha beta T cell populations. The BOB lab data identified gamma delta T cells as a potential target of immune intervention.
