= History of Chinese Americans in Colorado =

People of Chinese descent in Colorado

People of Chinese descent have lived in Colorado since the mid-nineteenth century, when many emigrated from China for work. Chinese immigrants have made an undeniable impact on Colorado's history and culture. While the Chinese moved throughout the state, including building small communities on the Western Slope and establishing Chinatown, Denver, the presence of Chinese Coloradans diminished significantly due to violence and discriminatory policies. As of 2018, there were 45,273 Chinese Americans living in Colorado.

== History ==
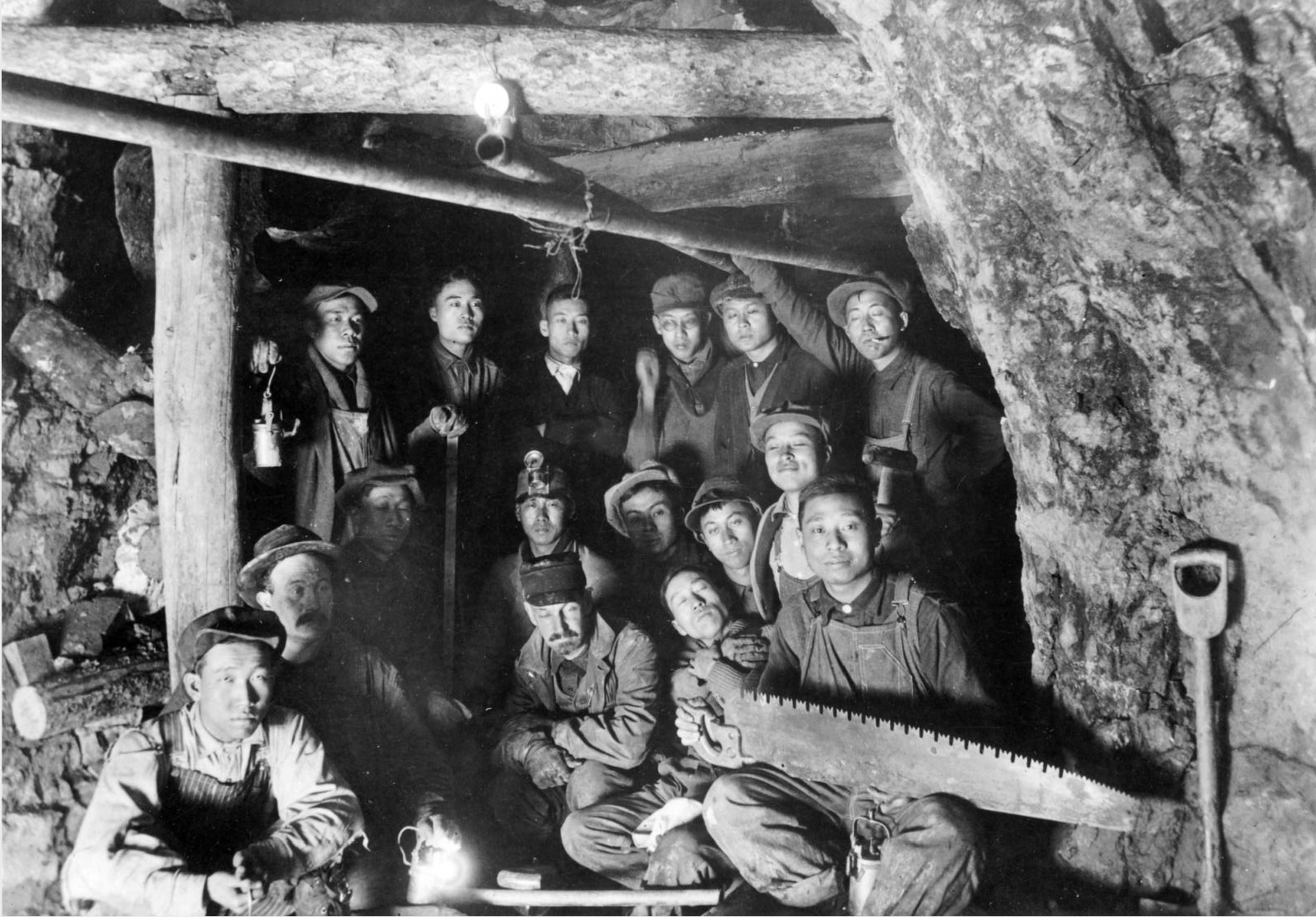
Chinese miners pose in a mine in Idaho Springs, Colorado

There is no doubt that Chinese immigrants to Colorado helped construct the physical and ideological foundations of the state. Similar to in many Western states, the first Chinese immigrants came to the area for manual labor jobs, such as railroad construction and mining.

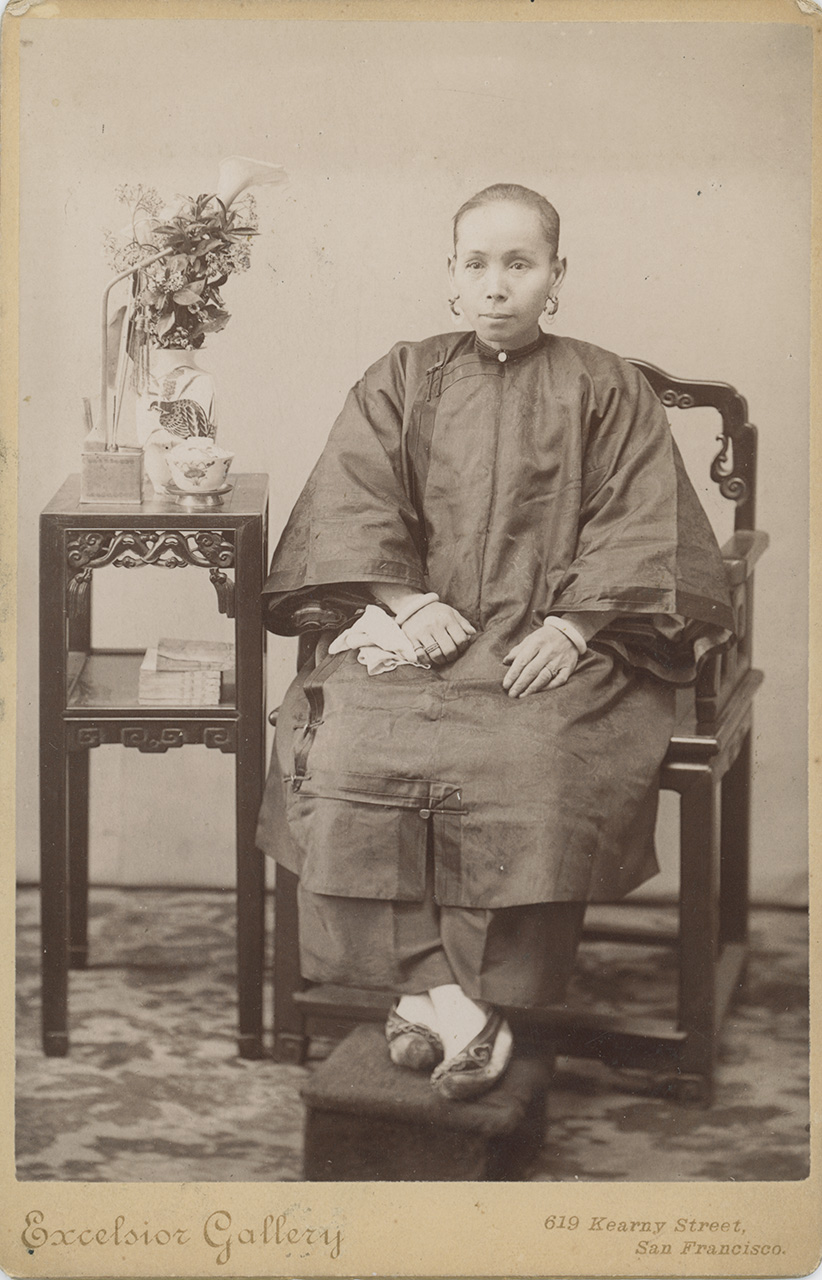
Portrait of "China Mary," who operated a laundry in Fairplay, Colorado in the 1880s. (Park County Local History Digital Archive)

=== First Chinese Immigrants to Colorado (1869-1900) ===
Chinese immigrants first arrived in Colorado in 1869. Many came as employees of the Central Pacific Railroad, Kansas Pacific Railway, and Union Pacific Railroad companies as they completed the transcontinental railroad. According to a letter written by Joseph Wolff of Boulder, Colorado, which was published in the Rocky Mountain News, Chinese labor was especially attractive because it was “cheaper labor” that would offer a “chance of relief” for Americans performing hard labor in the west.

In addition to railroads, the mining industry drew many Chinese immigrants. Park County, one of the most significant regions in Colorado's mining history, was home to several Chinese mining camps. There is evidence of Chinese immigrants living near Hamilton, Como, and King, while most lived near Fairplay, where they established a small Chinatown. In Fairplay, Chinese immigrants not only worked as miners, but as servants, cooks, housekeepers, launderers, and merchants. In Park County, the Chinese community gained a reputation as “vigorous, dependable workers by all who employed them.

The Chinese also settled in Denver, where many opened laundries to meet the needs of the predominantly male city. By 1870, “Chinaman's Row” was established on Wazee Street in Denver, where forty-two Chinese immigrants lived and worked. By 1890, “Chinaman's Row” had evolved into Chinatown, Denver, with a peak population of 980 people.

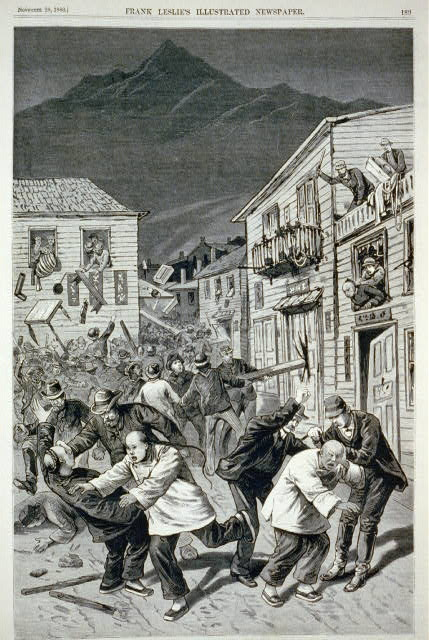
Wood engraving depicting the Anti-Chinese Riot of 1880 in Denver. Originally published in Frank Leslie's Illustrated Newspaper, November 20, 1880.

==== Anti-Chinese Riot of 1880 ====
Similar to the rest of the United States, Chinese immigrants in Colorado faced a great deal of prejudice since their arrival. For many who had moved to Colorado from California, anti-Chinese violence was not new. During the 1873 depression, labor shortages caused Sinophobic rhetoric and action to rise in popularity. This Sinophobia is most evident in Colorado newspapers written by the white community, often full of pejorative epithets and slurs against Asian Americans. The rhetoric became action in many parts of the state; in 1874, white miners drove 160 Chinese immigrants out of Nederland, Colorado, and in 1879, Leadville, Colorado proudly announced they had no Chinese people living in the town.

In 1880, the tension grew to a head during the 1880 presidential election, where the immigration of Chinese people became a national issue. On October 30, 1880, supporters of Democratic presidential candidate Winfield S. Hancock marched through Denver carrying signs with anti-Chinese rhetoric. The next evening, a white mob started a race riot in Chinatown, where nearly every building was burned to the ground.

In the sixty years following the riot, U.S. Census reports showed more Chinese people leaving Colorado each decade. In 1890, there were 1,398 Chinese people in the state, and by 1940, the number had dwindled to 216, and Chinese communities in Colorado inevitably disappeared.

Postwar and 21st Century

As Chinese immigration increased following the Immigration and Nationality Act of 1965 and the opening up of relations between the US and the People's Republic of China, Chinese populations in Colorado increased, mainly settling in the Denver metropolitan area: communities of Chinese-Americans have built up in Denver and Aurora.

The 2021 US Census showed that 47,500 Chinese Americans lived in Colorado, making Chinese-Americans the largest Asian American group in the state.

== Notable Chinese Americans in Colorado ==
There are numerous Chinese peoples that made immense contributions to the United States and Colorado throughout the nineteenth and early twentieth century C.E. They built the transcontinental railroad across the west, and levees in Sacramento, bred new and more sustainable species of fruits and vegetables, were educational pathfinders in science and engineering at Yale University, dentists, doctors, lawyers, leaders, innovators, entrepreneurs, political and social activists, as well as neighbors and friends.

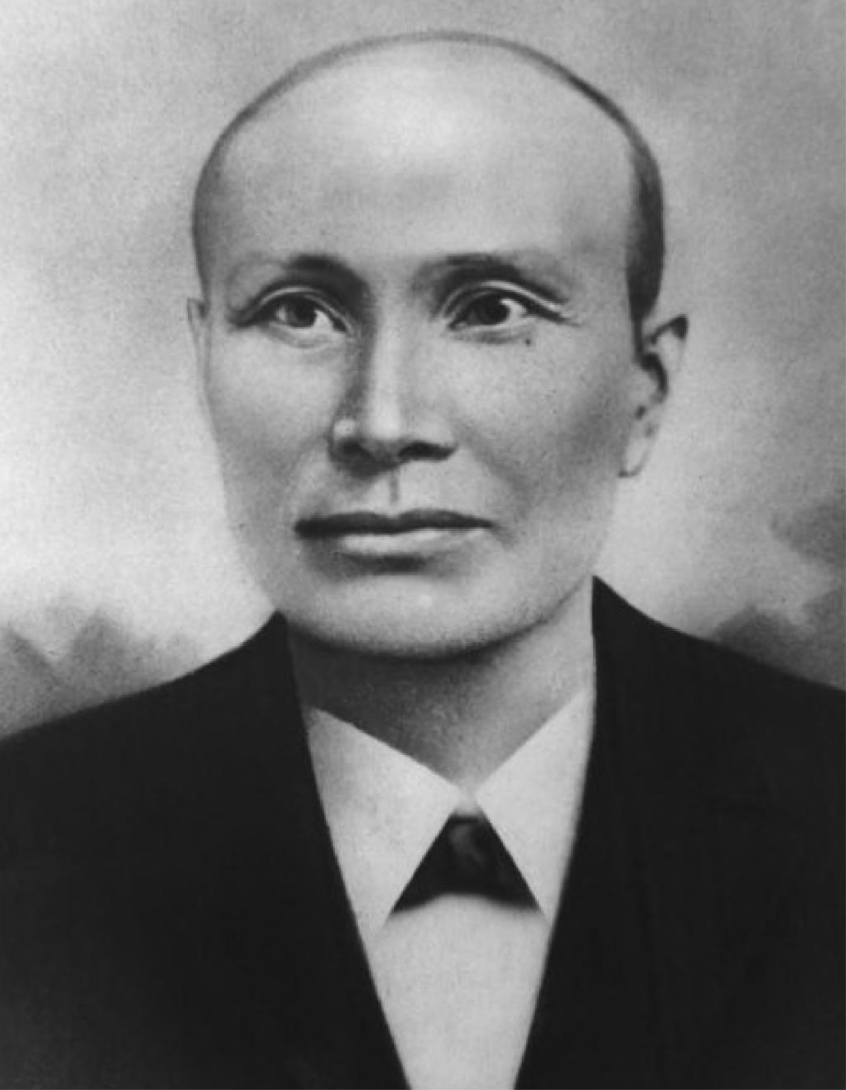
Portrait of Chin Lin Sou, circa 1880s. (History Colorado)

=== Chin Lin Sou (1836–1894) ===
Chin Lin Sou (1836–1894) immigrated to the United States from Guangzhou, China in 1859, and was one of the first Chinese immigrants to Colorado. He was in charge of the first crew of Chinese laborers to work on the Central Pacific Railroad. In 1871, Chin moved to Colorado to work as a labor contractor managing Chinese placer miners in Black Hawk. Later in life, he became a merchant in Gilpin County and Denver, importing food, clothing, and furniture from China, and founded organizations that supported Chinese businesses and communities in Colorado. This work earned him the title of the “Mayor of Chinatown” in Denver. Chin brought his wife from China in 1873, and their first child, Lily, is considered the first Chinese American child born in Colorado. They had six children in total.

== See also ==
Encyclopedia of the Great Plains: Asian Americans

Park County Local History Digital Archive: Immigration and Mining

Organization of Chinese Americans (OCA) Colorado

Asian Pacific Development Center

The Colorado American and Chinese Professional Association
