= GlaxoSmithKline Prize =

Medical and veterinary research award

The GlaxoSmithKline Prize and Lecture is awarded by the Royal Society of London "for original contributions to medical and veterinary sciences published within ten years from the date of the award".

Sponsored by GlaxoSmithKline, the medal is awarded with a gift of £2500. The medal was first awarded in 1980 to César Milstein "in recognition of his pioneering the production of monoclonal antibodies from hybrid cell lines and initiating their application worldwide in many fields of biology and medicine", and has since been awarded 13 times.

== List of recipients ==
Source: Royal Society

Year	Name	Rationale	Notes
1980	César Milstein	"in recognition of his pioneering the production of monoclonal antibodies from hybrid cell lines and initiating their application worldwide in many fields of biology and medicine"	—
1982	Hans Kosterlitz	"in recognition of his studies of the action of opiates and the discovery of the enkephalins"	—
1984	Edward Raymond Andrew, James M. S. Hutchison, John Mallard and Peter Mansfield	"in recognition of their development of NMR imaging as a diagnostic tool in medicine"	—
1986	Donald Metcalf and Leo Sachs	"in recognition of their discovery of factors which regulate growth and differentiation in normal and leukaemic blood-forming tissue"	—
1988	Louis M. Kunkel	"in recognition of his achievement in identifying by novel techniques of reverse genetics the biochemical abnormality responsible for Duchenne/Becker muscular dystrophy as being the absence of a previously unknown protein, dystrophin"	—
1990	Philippa Marrack and John Kappler	"in recognition of their seminal contributions to T-cell biology, which include the characterisation of the T-cell receptor; the demonstration that self-tolerance is caused by clonal elimination in the thymus; and the discovery that bacterial toxins act as 'superantigens'"	—
1992	Paul Nurse	"in recognition of his seminal contributions to the understanding of the molecular basis of regulation of the eukaryotic cycle"	—
1994	David Barker	"in recognition of his singularly novel and important contributions to our understanding of the causes of a number of the major diseases of later life (cardiovascular disease, obstructive airways disease and diabetes) by demonstrating that their origins may lie in fetal nutrition and in growth in utero and during infancy"	—
1996	Charles Weissmann	"in recognition of his work on prion diseases which lead to the remarkable advances in understanding the molecular biology of spongiform encephalopathies"	—
1998	Gillian Bates and Stephen Davies	"in recognition of their discovery of the cause of Huntington's Disease, a dominantly inherited, late onset, fatal neurodegenerative disease"	—
2000	David MacLennan	"in recognition of his work on calcium regulatory proteins, particularly in the understanding of malignant hyperthermia (MH), central core disease (CCD), Brody disease and phospholamban, and applying his knowledge of the gene in MH to develop accurate diagnosis of disease in pigs. In addition to its valuable veterinary application, this work represents a particularly good example of the way in which basic science has been developed to the point at which it is widely applied"	—
2003	Michael Neuberger	"in recognition of his work on resolving the molecular mechanism of somatic antibody diversification, a key feature of immune response, with consequences reaching far beyond immunology to DNA instability and cancer"	—
2005	Nicholas White	"for his outstanding work on the treatment and prevention of serious diseases within the developing world"	—
2007	Mark Pepys	"for his excellent work as a clinical scientist who has identified specific proteins as new therapeutic targets and developed novel drugs with potential use in amyloidosis, Alzheimer's disease and cardiovascular disease"	—
2010	Stephen Craig West	"in recognition of his pioneering work on the molecular mechanisms of genetic recombination and DNA repair and their relation to tumorigenesis"	
2012	Adrian Peter Bird	"for his outstanding contributions in the field of epigenetics, especially DNA methylation and its role in development and disease."	-
2014	Nicholas Lydon	"for the development of the drug imatinib, a targeted tyrosine kinase inhibitor that has transformed the treatment of chronic myelogenous leukaemia (CML) and is a paradigm for cancer drug discovery."	
2016	Andrew Hattersley	"for his work on genetic and physiological studies of patients with common subtypes of monogenic diabetes"	

== See also ==
- List of medicine awards
