= David Rubinstein =

David Rubinstein may refer to:

- David Rubinstein (social historian) (1932–2019), American social historian
- David Rubinstein (pianist) (born 1949), American pianist
- Dave Rubinstein (1964–1993), American punk musician

== See also ==
- David Rubenstein
- David Rubinsztein
