= Park House School =

Coordinates: 51.37967°N 1.34064°W

Location
- Andover Road; Newbury, Berkshire, RG14 6NQ; England

Information
- Type: Academy
- Motto: A Leading Academy For The Whole Community
- Local authority: West Berkshire
- Department for Education URN: 149435 Tables
- Ofsted: Reports
- Staff: Around 150
- Gender: Co-educational
- Age: 11 to 18
- Enrolment: 1300 (Set grow to 1600)
- Houses: 4
- Colours: Navy and Sky Blue
- GCSE results: 368.5 points/student
- Website: http://www.parkhouseschool.org

Park House School is a secondary school in Newbury, Berkshire in the United Kingdom. It accepts students aged 11–18 and currently has approximately 1,300 students on roll including a sixth form of around 300. On 1 May 2011, Park House School became an independently run Academy. It was formerly a comprehensive school run by the West Berkshire Education Authority. The schools latest Ofsted inspection (Apr 2022) rated PHS as ‘Inadequate’

== House system ==
The school operates a house system, whereby students are divided up into four houses (each of which are in turn split into two), which are named after notable sporting alumni, which are then broken down into two tutor groups for each house per year. The tutor groups are named after An Olympian. Each House is led by a member of staff and run by Year 12 and 13 House Presidents & Vice Presidents. They are supported by House Captains from Years 10 and 11. All staff members belong to a house, as do all Sixth Formers:

House	Subdivisions
Croft	Omega and Lambda
Albert	Alpha and Beta
Chaffey	Delta and Gamma
Joseph	Theta and Sigma

The houses are named after former sporting alumni that went there: Tom Croft, Toby Albert, Anabelle Chaffey, and Jonathan Joseph

== Facilities ==
The main library and sixth form library are situated together in a central area of the school (the main building). Both include private study areas. The school has a book stock of over 12,000 items. The library is currently run by the school librarian and 4-6 students who have been picked to be library monitors. Inside the library there are computers for educational uses. Often students use these during lessons and break times. The school is also a member of Newbury Library which facilitates inter-library loaning.

There is also a wide range of periodicals and multimedia facilities. There are about 500 computers situated in different areas all with internet access. One of the newest additions to the school is the Wellness Centre. The aim of this is teach students to live healthy lives. The centre includes a modern gym equipped with Technogym equipment, a cooking area to teach students to eat healthily, and an additional ICT classroom.

The school is site to many buildings, with quite a few of them being modular buildings. Blocks include- The Main Building, Art, Science, Mini Science Block, The 2 Maths Blocks, Music, Vocational/Learning Support, Design & Technology, Wellness Centre (as mentioned before), Sports Hall, Humanities, Modern Languages and The House. Modular Buildings include- Vocational/Learning Support, Wellness Centre, Music, Mini Science, Humanities and Modern Languages. The Main Building holds the whole English and History departments and part of the Computer Science departments.

In the main Maths block, there are a mix of lessons held on there. Classrooms including Maths- Food Technology, Textiles, Business Studies and Computer Science.

The House was/is a house come administrative building, with Reception, Repro-Graphics, Various Offices (including the headteachers and deputy-head teachers), Administration, Student Services, The Staff Room and Conference Centre.

Due to the nearby planned Sandleford Park development, the school is set to expand by around 300 students in the future. This also increases the chances of the rumour that the school is soon to be rebuilt like the nearby schools St. Bartholomews and Trinity.

== Location ==
The school site is situated on an extensive area of former parkland on the Andover Road, a residential area of Newbury in West Berkshire.

== Sports College Status ==
The school was designated as a Specialist Sports College in 1998 – one of the first wave of schools to achieve this status, and the only Sports College in the Local Education Authority. As part of the government push to fund facilities of Sports Colleges, Park House received funding for an AstroTurf pitch and floodlights.

== Notable alumni ==
- Brett Angell, footballer
- Martyn Ashton, mountain cyclist
- Fiona Button, actress
- Benjamin East, Team GB Javelin
- Lawrence Chaney, drag personality
- O. G. S. Crawford (1886–1957), archaeologist
- Tom Croft, rugby union player for England and the British Lions
- Safeen Dizayee, Kurdish Minister for Education
- Richard Houlston, Fellow of the Royal Society
- Jonathan Joseph, rugby union player for Bath, London Irish, and England
- Toby Radford, cricketer, cricket coach
- Garry Richardson, radio presenter for BBC 5Live
- Joe Tillen, footballer
- Sam Tillen, footballer
- Toby Albert, cricketer for Hampshire
- Shaun Pearce, canoeist for Great Britain
