= Gillian Bates =

British biologist

- Born: 19 May 1956 (age 70)
- Education: University of Sheffield (BSc); Birkbeck College, London (MSc); University of London (PhD)
- Known for: Co-discovering cause of Huntington's disease
- Awards: FMedSci; FRS; GlaxoSmithKline Prize
- Scientific career
- Fields: Neurogenetics
- Workplaces: University College London; King's College London
- Thesis: Molecular approaches towards the fine genetic mapping of human chromosomes : with special reference to the cystic fibrosis gene (1987)
- Website: www.ucl.ac.uk/ion/departments/sobell/Research/GBates

Gillian Patricia Bates (born 19 May 1956) is a British biologist. She is distinguished for her research into the molecular basis of Huntington's disease and in 1998 was awarded the GlaxoSmithKline Prize as a co-discoverer of the cause of this disease. As of 2016, she is Professor of Neurogenetics at UCL Institute of Neurology and the co-director of UCL Huntington's Disease Centre.

== Education ==
Bates was educated at Kenilworth Grammar School and the University of Sheffield where she graduated with a Bachelor of Science degree in 1979. She completed her postgraduate study at Birkbeck College, London where she was awarded a Master of Science degree in 1984 followed by St Mary's Hospital Medical School where she was awarded a PhD in 1987 for genetic mapping of the cystic fibrosis gene, working in the lab of Robert Williamson.

== Research ==
Bates's research has focused on Huntington's disease. She was one of the group who first cloned the Huntington's disease gene. She also created the first mouse model of the disease, the R6/2 mouse, an important step in understanding the pathogenesis of Huntington's.

Prior to joining UCL in 2016, Bates was the head of the Neurogenetics Research Group at King's College London.

== Awards and honours ==
Bates has been elected a fellow of the Academy of Medical Sciences (1999) and a member of the European Molecular Biology Organisation (2002). She was elected a Fellow of the Royal Society in 2007 and to its Council in 2011. In 1998, she was awarded the Royal Society Glaxo Wellcome Award jointly with Stephen Davies, for the "discovery of the cause of Huntington's Disease". In August 2024, Bates was recipient of the Royal Society's prestigious Ferrier Medal, which recognised her work in understanding the molecular basis of Huntington's disease.
