= Tom Croft =

British Lions & England international rugby union player

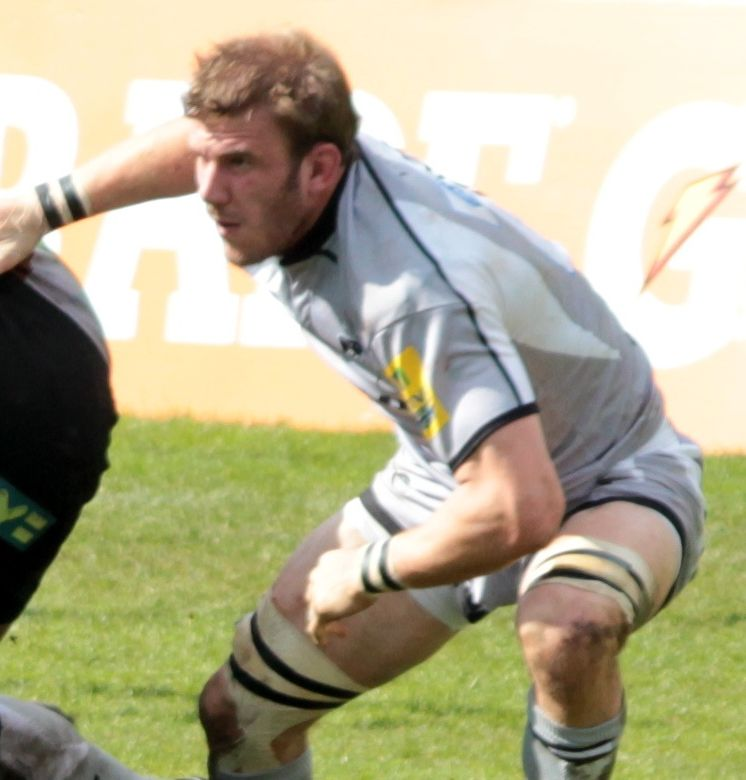
- Croft in 2012
- Born: Thomas Richard Croft; 7 November 1985 (age 41) Basingstoke, England
- Height: 1.98 m (6 ft 6 in)
- Weight: 110 kg (17 st 5 lb; 243 lb)
- School: Park House School; Oakham School

Rugby union career
- Position(s): Flanker, Lock
- Current team: Leicester Tigers
Youth career
- Newbury RFC
Senior career
Years	Team	Apps	(Points)
2005–2017	Leicester Tigers	173	(135)
- Correct as of 16 November 2017
International career
Years	Team	Apps	(Points)
2007	England Saxons		
2008–2015	England	40	(20)
2009, 2013	British & Irish Lions	5	(10)
- Correct as of 1 March 2015
National sevens team
Years	Team		Comps
2006	England 7s		

Tom Croft (born 7 November 1985) is an English former rugby union player. He played 173 games for Leicester Tigers between 2005–17, winning four Premiership Rugby titles, played 40 times for England between 2008–2015, was part of the squad for the 2011 Rugby World Cup, and the British & Irish Lions in their tours to South Africa in 2009 and Australia in 2013.

== Early life ==
Born 7 November 1985 in Basingstoke, England, Croft initially went to Park House School, a comprehensive school in Newbury, Berkshire, before going to Oakham School in Rutland where he was in the same year as England cricketer Stuart Broad.

== Playing style ==
Croft's primary position was blindside flanker. He was known for his line-out agility and unusual speed for a forward; one of the quickest players in the Tigers squad his coach Aaron Mauger described him as the " fastest loose forward he had ever seen".

== Club career ==
Croft's senior debut for Leicester Tigers came against Gloucester in the 2005–06 season, a week after he turned 20. In the following season, which included a Premiership title and the Anglo-Welsh Cup for the Tigers, he made 16 appearances.

2008–09 could be considered Croft's breakthrough season, in which he established himself both in the club side and on the international scene. He was man-of-the-match in the Heineken Cup semi-final against Cardiff Blues, which resulted in a historic sudden death kicking competition. The shoot-out ended before Croft's turn came up as Jordan Crane made the winning kick. Although the Tigers fell at the final hurdle of the Heineken Cup, they won the 2008–09 Guinness Premiership. Croft played lock in both finals, as a result of injury to teammate Louis Deacon.

The following season didn't quite match up to the previous for Croft, due in no small part to the two knee injuries he sustained, one after the other in the middle of the season. He worked his way back successfully, however, and featured in another Premiership final victory, this time at blindside flanker.

Croft captained the Tigers for the first time on 3 October 2010, against Saracens.

Croft suffered two major injuries whilst on club duty. First, in an April 2012 Premiership match against Harlequins Croft mistimed tackle on Nick Easter and suffered a triple fracture of his C6 vertebra, a specialist described the injury "as close as you can to being paralysed", He returned to the Tigers after 8 months injured in January 2013 against Worcester.

In 2013 Croft played in his third victorious Premiership final.

Then, in the 2013–14 Premiership opener against Worcester in September, he suffered a season-ending cruciate ligament injury.

In November 2017, Croft announced his immediate retirement from rugby following a new neck injury and consulting a specialist. His final appearance was on 11 March 2017 against Saracens in the semi-final of the Anglo-Welsh Cup, Croft was a substitute as Leicester won 32–10.

== International career ==
Croft was called up to the England squad for the 2008 Six Nations Championship. He had already been selected for the England Saxons and England Sevens sides.

Croft gained his first England cap in the 2008 Six Nations win against France in Paris. He was then named in Martin Johnson's squad on 1 June 2008. He gained starting places in the squad at blindside flanker for three games against the Pacific Islanders, Australia and South Africa, before being named on the bench against New Zealand. Croft was awarded man of the match when England defeated France 34–10 at Twickenham in the 2009 Six Nations Championship.

On 20 May 2009, Croft was called up to the squad by coach Ian McGeechan for the Lions 2009 tour of South Africa as a replacement for the banned Alan Quinlan.

Croft then subsequently started the first two tests against South Africa, and came off the bench in the 3rd test. He scored two tries in the first test defeat – becoming the first Lions forward to score twice against the Springboks.

In November 2009, Croft was nominated for the IRB Player of the Year for 2009, though the award went to Richie McCaw. Despite making the shortlist and having started the first two games of the Autumn Internationals, Croft found himself demoted to the bench for the third test, against New Zealand. Injury to Joe Worsley saw him take the field within the first five minutes, however.

Croft's second knee injury in the 2009–10 season saw him miss out on the 2010 Six Nations entirely, though he regained his starting place from James Haskell for the Australian summer tour. He switched to openside flanker to cover injured captain Lewis Moody halfway through the second half of the first Test, which England lost 27–17. The second Test saw England beat Australia 20–21. This was only the third time that England had managed to beat Australia in Australia.

Croft took part in the 2010 Autumn Internationals, starting in both the loss to New Zealand and the win against Australia, the latter cited by many to have been the best England performance for years. In 2011 he was part of the England team that came within a game of a grand slam. 2012 saw Croft play in every single game of that year's Six Nations, His form continued to improve throughout the Championship and he played a starring role in the game against France which saw him score a wonderful try after a searing burst of pace. The last game against Ireland, saw him make a 50-yard burst which almost brought about a try. Croft was ruled out of the rest of Leicester's season after a neck injury. His first try for England came as a replacement for James Haskell against Samoa.

In April 2013, Croft was selected for the 2013 British & Irish Lions tour to Australia. He started the first test in a 23–21 win over Australia and came off the bench in the 16–15 second test defeat.

Croft made his international return two years later during the 2015 Six Nations against Italy and Ireland in his final England appearance.

=== International Tries ===
==== England ====
Try	Opposing team	Location	Venue	Competition	Date	Result	Score
1	Samoa	London, England	Twickenham Stadium	2010 end-of-year rugby union internationals	20 November 2010	Win	26 – 13
2	Scotland	London, England	Twickenham Stadium	2011 Six Nations Championship	13 March 2011	Win	22 – 16
3	Romania	Dunedin, New Zealand	Otago Stadium	2011 Rugby World Cup	24 September 2011	Win	67 – 3
4	France	Saint-Denis, France	Stade de France	2012 Six Nations Championship	11 March 2012	Win	22 – 24

==== British & Irish Lions ====
Try	Opposing team	Location	Venue	Competition	Date	Result	Score
1	South Africa	Durban, South Africa	ABSA Stadium	2009 British & Irish Lions tour to South Africa	20 June 2009	Loss	26 – 21
2	South Africa	Durban, South Africa	ABSA Stadium	2009 British & Irish Lions tour to South Africa	20 June 2009	Loss	26 – 21
