= Robert Williamson (geneticist) =

British-Australian geneticist (1938–2026)

Robert Williamson AO FAA FRS FMedSci
- Born: 14 May 1938; Cleveland, Ohio, U.S.
- Died: 10 October 2026 (aged 88); Melbourne, Victoria, Australia
- Education: University College London
- Awards: Officer of the Order of Australia (2004)
- Scientific career
- Fields: Human Genetics; Molecular genetics
- Workplaces: Murdoch Children's Research Institute, University of Melbourne
- Website: www.rch.org.au/alumni/alumni_profiles/Williamson,_Bob_________AO/

Robert Williamson AO FAA FRS FMedSci (14 May 1938 – 10 October 2026) was a British-Australian molecular biologist who specialised in the mapping, gene identification, and diagnosis of human genetic disorders.

== Life and career ==
Williamson was born in Cleveland, Ohio on 14 May 1938, to Scottish parents. He was educated at the Bronx High School of Science in New York and then Wandsworth School in South London after his parents returned to the UK when he was 16, before studying at University College London. From 1963 he was lecturer, then senior lecturer, in developmental biology at the University of Glasgow. From 1976 he was Professor and head of Molecular Genetics and Biochemistry at St Mary's Hospital Medical School, University of London.

He emigrated to Melbourne, Australia in 1995 to be Director of the Murdoch Children's Research Institute (then the Murdoch Institute) and Professor of Medical Genetics at the University of Melbourne. He edited several books on genetic engineering and on the ethics of the new genetic sciences.

After his retirement in 2004, Williamson had been the Secretary for Science Policy at the Australian Academy of Science and an Honorary Senior Principal Fellow (Professor) at the University of Melbourne. He also continued to mentor and advise students through to senior leaders in science, medicine and policy. Williamson was named a finalist in the Australian Museum's Eureka Prize for Outstanding Mentor of Young Researchers in 2013.

Williamson died in Melbourne on 10 October 2026, at the age of 88.

== Research ==
Williamson began his career working on haemoglobin synthesis in reticulocytes (immature red blood cells) and thalassaemias (inherited blood disorders). As a lecturer at the University of Glasgow, he studied human gene organisation and expression. In 1970, he was the solo author of a paper that provided the dual discovery of the origin of cell-free DNA and the nucleosome organisation of DNA in chromosomes, including the first description of the "nucleosome ladder". Decades later, the geneticists Steven Henikoff and George Church hailed Williamson's report as "a remarkably prescient paper," adding: "The simultaneous discovery of the nucleosome ladder and the origin of [cell-free] cfDNA in 1970 was thus correctly interpreted by Williamson, respectively 3 years and nearly 3 decades before the biological significance of nucleosomes and the clinical utility of cfDNA were appreciated."

He chose not to follow up on those results, turning his attention to messenger RNA and then the study of globin genes and the thalassaemias. In 1974, Williamson's group demonstrated that severe alpha-thalassaemia is due to a deletion in the alpha globin gene, and subsequently that delta-beta thalassaemia was attributed to a deletion in the beta globin gene. From his new position at St. Mary's Hospital Medical School, Williamson's group went on to clone the human alpha-, beta- and gamma-globin genes from cDNAs, and used them to deduce their genomic structures.

By 1980, Williamson and colleagues began applying the discovery of DNA markers called restriction fragment length polymorphisms to perform linkage mapping to locate the position of important human disease genes. In 1982, working with Kay Davies, Williamson's group narrowed down the location of the X-linked Duchenne muscular dystrophy gene. Williamson is best known for his research on the genetics of cystic fibrosis. In 1985, Williamson lead one of three teams that independently mapped the gene mutated in cystic fibrosis to chromosome 7, sparking an intense international race to identify the gene. His group came close to isolating the defective gene, reporting a strong candidate in 1987, only to be scooped by Lap-Chee Tsui, Francis Collins and colleagues in 1989.

Throughout the 1980s, Williamson and colleagues pursued the use of random DNA markers to map mutated genes responsible for several other major genetic disorders, including myotonic dystrophy, Friedreich's ataxias, coronary artery disease, craniofacial abnormalities, and Alzheimer's disease. In 1988, Williamson's group also developed the first method for genetic testing using cheek buccal epithelial cells obtained by a simple mouthwash. In 1991, John Hardy, a lecturer in Williamson's department, identified the first mutation associated with Alzheimer's disease in the gene encoding the amyloid precursor protein (APP).

Williamson was an early proponent of human gene therapy, writing presciently in 1982: "Gene therapy is not yet possible, but may become feasible soon, particularly for well understood gene defects. Although treatment of a patient raises no ethical problems once it can be done well, changing the genes of an early embryo is more difficult, controversial and unlikely to be required clinically." Following the discovery of the CF gene in 1989, he turned his attention to developing strategies for gene therapy for CF patients in his final years at St. Mary's, including a non-viral proof-of-concept study in the inaugural issue of Nature Medicine.

He recruited and mentored many leading molecular geneticists during his two decades at St. Mary's Hospital, including Royal Society Fellows Dame Kay Davies, Stephen D. M. Brown, Gillian Bates and John Hardy. Davies recalled: "With Bob, nothing was impossible; he always knew someone in the field who would be able to help whenever we needed a new technique or vector for cloning. He taught me how much more successful you could be as a scientist if you were collaborative and had an extensive network of basic and clinical scientists." Hardy acknowledged that the "first 13 grant applications I wrote were unsuccessful and without the continuing support of Bob, our efforts would have foundered."

In 1995, Williamson moved from London to Melbourne, Australia, to become Director of the Murdoch Children's Research Institute, taking over from David Danks, a clinical geneticist who had trained with Victor A. McKusick. Williamson directed a broad research portfolio on a range of molecular genetics technologies, such as preimplantation genetic diagnosis used in conjunction with in vitro fertilisation and Friedreich's ataxia He established training for genetic counsellors and public health paediatricians and continued working at the interface of ethics genetics, with a particular interest in Aboriginal genomics. Williamson successfully broadened the orientation of the Murdoch Institute, growing it to some 600 staff by the time he retired in 2005, pursuing research on ethics, public health, and genetics of complex diseases.

Williamson published more than 400 scientific papers. He had advocated for the societal benefits of genetic testing, including proposing community-wide carrier screening for cystic fibrosis and universal DNA testing.

== Honours and awards ==
In 1994, he was awarded the King Faisal International Prize in Medicine, together with W. French Anderson, for medical applications of molecular genetics.

In 1997, he received an Honorary MD degree from the University of Turku, Finland.

Williamson was elected to the Royal Society in 1999 and to the Academy of Medical Sciences in 2002. He was also a Fellow of the Royal College of Physicians, the Royal College of Pathologists and the Australian Academy of Science (2001).

In 2004, he was appointed an Officer of the Order of Australia (AO).
