= Toby Albert =

English cricketer (born 2001)

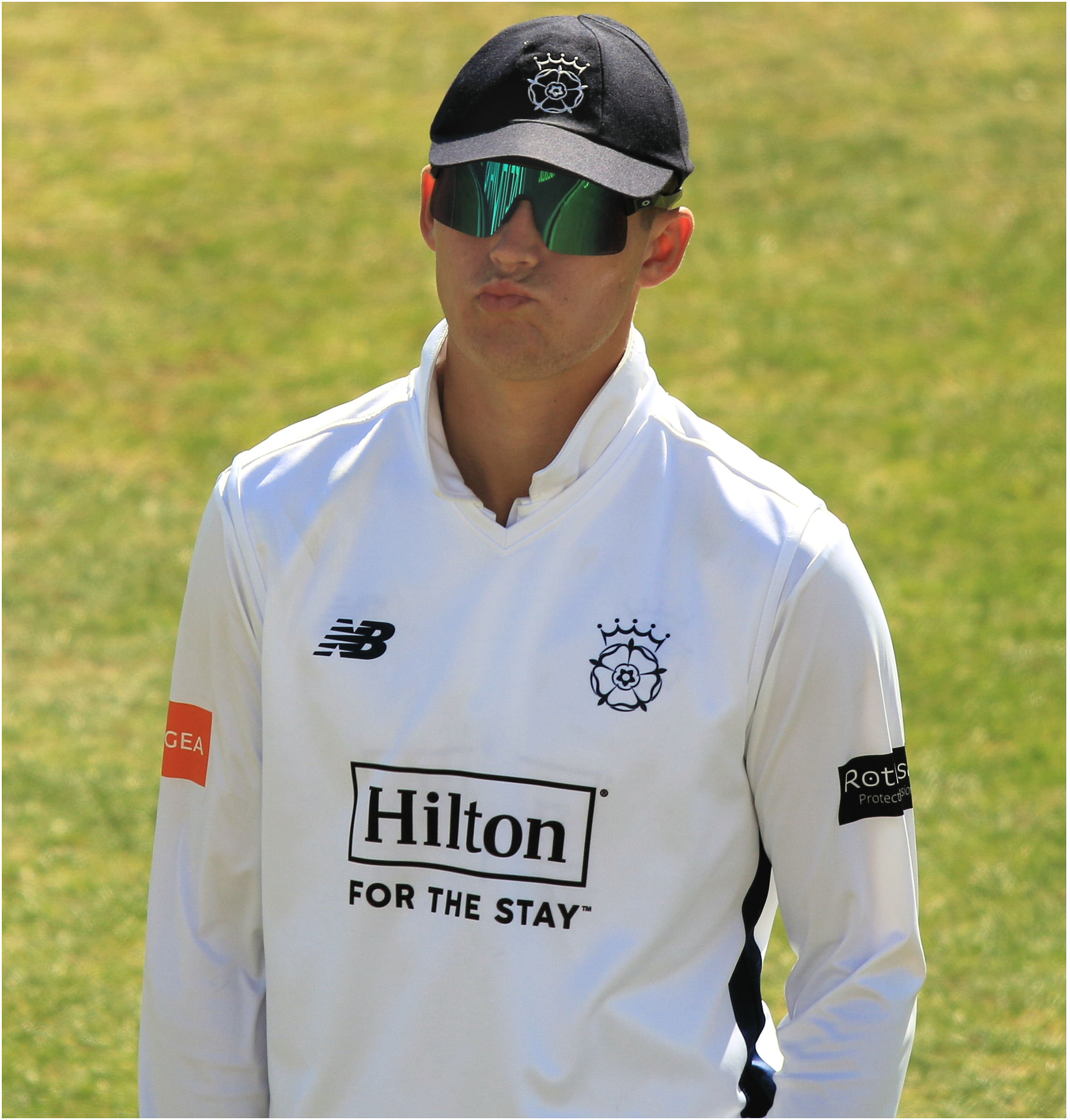
- Albert in 2025

Personal information
- Full name: Toby Edward Albert
- Born: 12 November 2001 (age 25); Basingstoke, Hampshire, England
- Batting: Right-handed
- Bowling: Right-arm off break
- Role: Batsman; occasional wicket-keeper
- Relatives: Samantha Albert (mother)

Domestic team information
- Years: Team
- 2021–present: Hampshire (squad no. 15)
- 2023: → Kent (on loan)
- 2025: Southern Brave
- 2025/26: Dubai Capitals
- FC debut: 13 May 2022; Hampshire v SLC Development XI
- LA debut: 5 August 2022 Hampshire v Worcestershire

Career statistics
Competition	FC	LA	T20
Matches	35	28	75
Runs scored	1,400	962	1,438
Batting average	22.95	41.82	25.67
100s/50s	2/5	0/7	0/7
Top score	124	96*	98*
Catches/stumpings	33/–	15/0	26/1
- Source: Cricinfo, 26 September 2026

Toby Edward Albert (born 12 November 2001) is an English cricketer. He grew up in Newbury, starting his career at a local club in East Woodhay and studied at Park House School.

He made his Twenty20 debut on 9 July 2021, for Hampshire in the 2021 T20 Blast. He made his first-class debut on 13 May 2022, for Hampshire against the Sri Lanka Cricket Development XI team during their tour of England. Later, he made his List A debut on 5 August 2022, for Hampshire in the 2022 Royal London One-Day Cup. On 25 May 2024, he scored his maiden first-class century against Surrey in the 2024 County Championship.

On 13 November 2026, he was named in the Canada national cricket team for the upcoming 2026 Cricket World Cup Qualifier Play-off, taking place in Nepal. His mother was born in Montreal, Quebec, fulfilling the ancestry requirements for international representation under ICC eligibility guidelines.
