= Mark Pepys =

South African-born British academic of medicine

Professor Sir Mark Pepys FRS FRCP FRCPath FMedSci
- Born: Mark Brian Pepys; 18 September 1944 (age 81); Cape Town, South Africa
- Education: UCL Medical School (MBBS); University of Cambridge (BA, PhD)
- Awards: FRS (1998)
- Scientific career
- Fields: Amyloids; Amyloidosis
- Workplaces: University College London
- Thesis: Role of complement in induction of the allergic response (1973)
- Website: www.royalfree.nhs.uk/services/staff-a-z/professor-mark-pepys

Sir Mark Brian Pepys (born 18 September 1944) is a South African-born British academic of medicine. He was until 2011 Professor of Medicine at University College London and Head of Medicine at the Hampstead Campus and the Royal Free Hospital. He is listed as a member of the Jewish Medical Association UK.

== Education ==
Pepys was born in Cape Town, South Africa, the son of physician Jack Pepys FRCP FRCPE FRCPath and Rhoda Gertrude Pepys (née Kussel). He moved to the UK in 1948. He finished his early education at the University of Cambridge, and then qualified as a medical doctor at University College London Medical School. He then returned to Cambridge where he was awarded a PhD in Immunology in 1973.

== Awards and honours ==
Pepys won the GlaxoSmithKline Prize in 2007 "for his excellent work as a clinical scientist who has identified specific proteins as new therapeutic targets and developed novel drugs with potential use in amyloidosis, Alzheimer's disease and cardiovascular disease". In 1998, Pepys was elected a Fellow of the Royal Society (FRS). His nomination reads:

Pepys has made seminal contributions in three areas: complement and immune response, the pentraxin proteins, and amyloidosis, and is a leading authority on these subjects in the UK and internationally. He discovered the role of complement in induction of antibody production and antigen localisation to germinal centres. He has pioneered work on the structure, function and clinical applications of the pentraxins, C-reactive protein (CRP) and serum amyloid P component (SAP), and identified most of the known members of this valuable aid to patient management. He discovered the capacity of SAP for calcium-dependent binding, which underlies its universal deposition in amyloid, described its interaction with DNA in-vivo and in-vitro, and its ability to solubilise chromatin, and identified SAP as a normal tissue protein. He introduced radiolabelled SAP as a diagnostic in-vivo tracer for amyloid, which has revolutionised knowledge of the natural history of amyloidosis and its response to treatment. He has discovered that variants of lysozyme can form amyloid and identified the first mutations in the human lysozyme gene, as well as novel amyloidogenic variants of apolipoprotein AI and transthyretin.

In 1999, he became director of the University College London Centre for Amyloidosis and Acute Phase Proteins.

Mark Pepys has recently won the 2008 Ernst Chain Prize for his work on amyloid diseases, established by Imperial College London in recognition of leaders in their fields.

Pepys was knighted in the 2012 New Year Honours for services to biomedicine.

== See also ==
- SAP scan
