= Nicholas White (physician) =

British medical doctor and researcher (1951–2026)

Professor Sir Nicholas White KCMG OBE FRS FBPhS
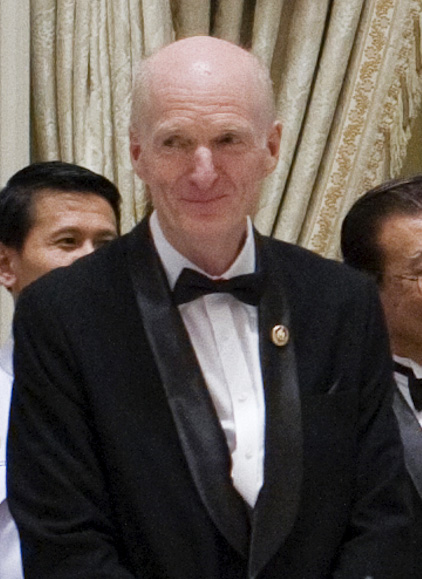
- White in 2011

Professor of Tropical Medicine, University of Oxford
- In office 1996–2026

Professor of Tropical Medicine, Mahidol University
- Incumbent
- Assumed office 1995

Personal details
- Born: Nicholas John White; 13 March 1951 London, England
- Died: 1 February 2026 (aged 74) Oxford, England
- Occupation: Tropical medicine specialist

Sir Nicholas John White (13 March 1951 – 1 February 2026) was a British medical doctor and researcher, specialising in tropical medicine in developing countries. He was known for his work on tropical diseases, especially malaria using artemisinin-based combination therapy.

== Early life and education ==
White was born in London on 13 March 1951. He studied medicine at the Guy's Hospital Medical School at King's College London. He completed his residency in internal medicine at various hospitals in London and at the Radcliffe Infirmary in Oxford.

== Research and career ==
White worked in Nepal between 1974 and 1980. Since 1980, he was part of development of the Mahidol Oxford Research Unit (MORU), a scientific collaboration between the faculty of Mahidol University in Thailand and the Nuffield Department of Medicine of the University of Oxford. Since 1986, he was the director of MORU and has opened similar collaborations with Vietnam, the Oxford University Clinical Research Unit (OUCRU) in 1991, and Laos in 1999.

He dedicated his career to research on tropical diseases such as malaria, melioidosis, typhoid fever, tetanus, dengue fever, rickettsiosis, tropical outbreaks of influenza, and COVID-19. His most impactful scientific legacy include multinational clinical trials that generated the evidence for artemisinin-based combination therapies (ACTs) becoming the global standard for Plasmodium falciparum malaria, and in particular intravenous artesunate as standard treatment for severe malaria.

In 2009, he was elected as the first Chair of the WorldWide Antimalarial Resistance Network (WWARN) Board and held this position until 2016. He was a Board member of the Infectious Diseases Data Observatory (IDDO) from 2016 until his passing in 2026. He also served as Chair of the Scientific Advisory Committee for the Drugs for Neglected Diseases initiative (DNDi) between 2016 and 2025.

== Personal life and death ==
White was married and had three children. He died of an aggressive form of cancer in Oxford, England, at the age of 74. According to The Times, he was still writing papers and advising on clinical studies until the day before his death.

== Awards and memberships ==
White was appointed an Officer of the Order of the British Empire (OBE) in the 1999 Birthday Honours. He was awarded the GlaxoSmithKline Prize in 2005 and was elected a Fellow of the Royal Society (FRS) in 2006. He was also a Fellow of the British Pharmacological Society (FBPhS) and of the Academy of Medical Sciences (FMedSci) from 2001.

In 2010, White received the Patrick Manson Medal from the Royal Society of Tropical Medicine and Hygiene, the John Dirks Canada Gairdner Global Health Award, and the Prince Mahidol Award. In the 2017 New Year Honours he was appointed a Knight Commander of the Order of St Michael and St George (KCMG).

== Publications ==
White was the author or co-author of more than 1300 scientific publications. His h-index was 218 at the time of his death (Feb 2026).
