= Richard Houlston =

British medical geneticist (born 1956)

Richard Houlston FRS FMedSci FRCP FRCPE FRCPath FRSB
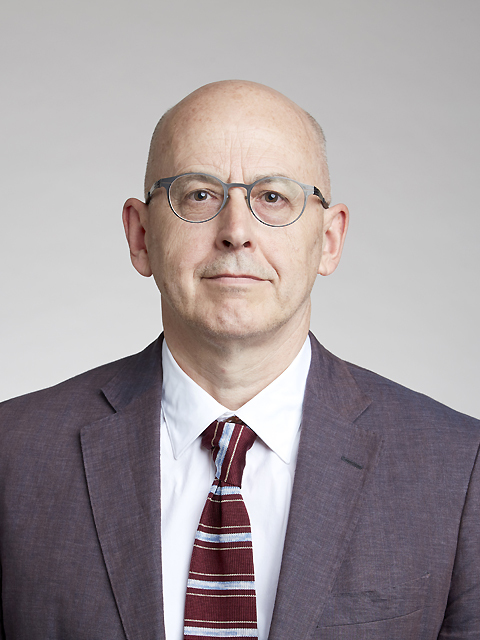
- Houlston in 2017
- Born: 10 July 1956 (age 70); Reading, Berkshire, England
- Education: Park House School; St Bartholomew's School
- Alma mater: Charing Cross Hospital Medical School; King's College London; University of London; Imperial College London
- Scientific career
- Fields: Medical genetics
- Workplaces: Walsgrave Hospital; Charing Cross Hospital; Kingston Hospital; King's College London; Imperial Cancer Research Fund; Southampton University; Institute of Cancer Research
- Website: www.icr.ac.uk/our-research/researchers-and-teams/professor-richard-houlston

Richard Somerset Houlston (born 10 July 1956) is a British medical geneticist. He is a professor of molecular and population genetics at the Institute of Cancer Research in London.

== Education ==
Houlston graduated BSc, MB BS from Charing Cross Hospital Medical School, University of London and was subsequently awarded MD and PhD degrees from the University of London and a DSc from Imperial College, London.

== Research and career ==
The main focus of his research is the identification and characterisation of genetic susceptibility to cancer.

=== Awards and honours ===
He is a Fellow of the Royal College of Physicians (FRCP) and a Fellow of the Royal College of Pathologists (FRCPath), and was elected a Fellow of the Academy of Medical Sciences (FMedSci) in 2010 and a Fellow of the Royal Society (FRS) in 2017.
