= Chin Lin Sou =

Chinese-American community leader (1836–1894)

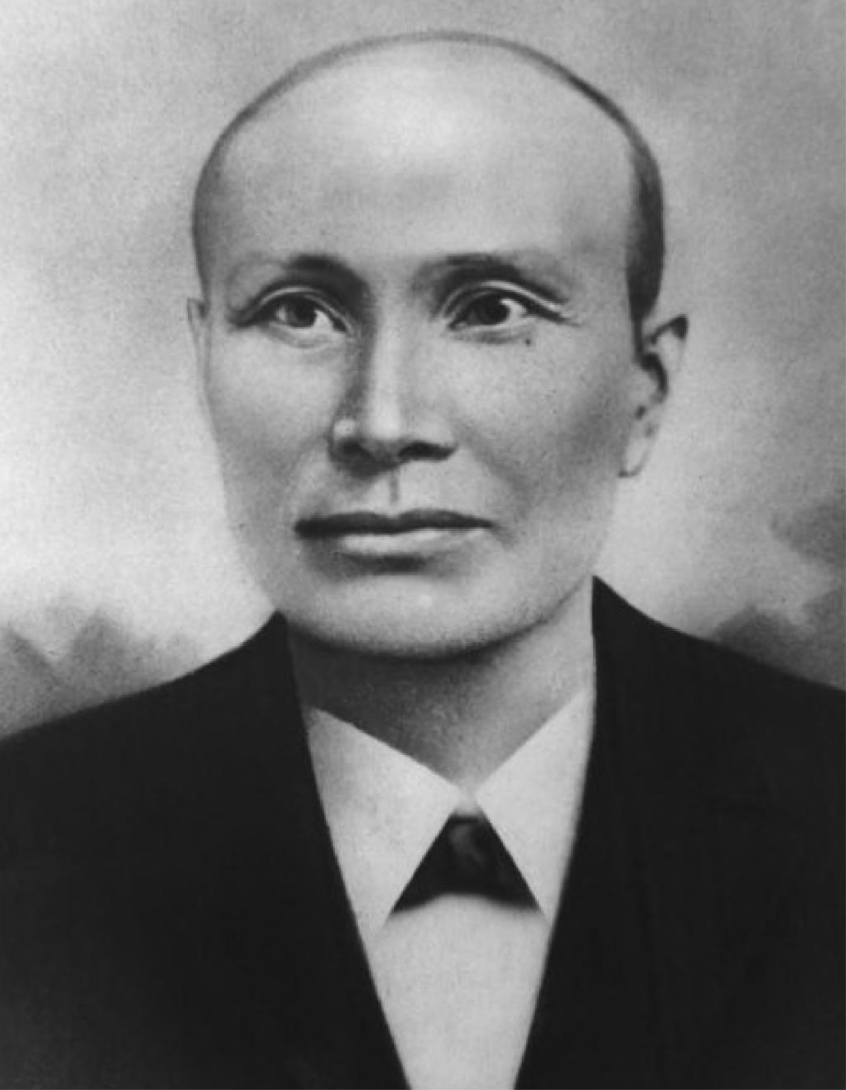
Chin Lin Sou, ca. 1880s. History Colorado, Stephen H. Hart Library and Research Center

Chin Lin Sou (September 29, 1836 – August 10, 1894, 陳林新) was an influential leader in the Chinese American community and prominent figure in Colorado. He immigrated to the United States from Guangzhou, China, in 1859. Chin stood out amongst other Chinese immigrants at the time as he dressed like a westerner and spoke perfect English. He was a supervisor of hundreds of Chinese workers who built the transcontinental railroad and feeder lines across California, Utah, Nevada, Wyoming, and Colorado.

He was among the first Chinese immigrants in Colorado. He became wealthy by buying abandoned mines and selling them or operating placer mines. He was a merchant in Gilpin County and Denver, Colorado. Known as a leader, he founded and was a member in organizations that supported Chinese business people and communities. In 1977, a stained glass portrait of Chin was installed at the Old Supreme Court in the Colorado State Capitol building in Denver for his role in Colorado's history.

== Early life ==
Chin Lin Sou was born in Canton (now called Guangzhou) in southern China on September 29, 1836. To escape the civil war in China (Taiping Rebellion), he traveled by sea to San Francisco, California in 1859. He was inspired by tales of success in the American West. Upon his arrival, he mined for gold for several years in California.

In the United States, he was seen as less foreign than other Chinese people because he wore western clothing, was over six feet tall, had blue eyes, and spoke English fluently. (Note: His eyes were discussed as grey in one source and blue-grey in another.) Based upon the color of his eyes and his height, his family may have been from northern China. He was recognized as an intelligent man and a quick learner, who had great executive ability.

== Career ==
=== Railroad ===
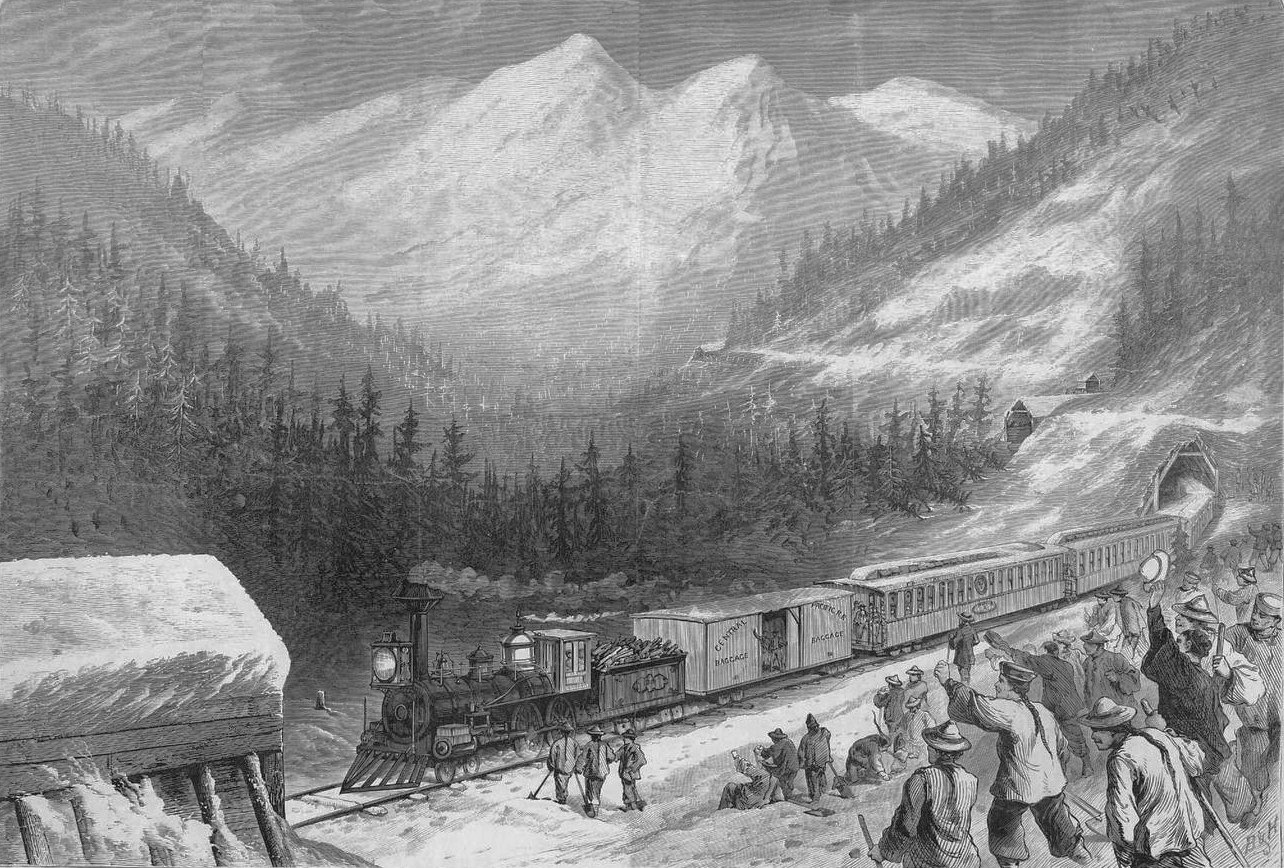
Chinese workers in the snow constructing the first transcontinental railroad.

He worked on the first transcontinental railroad as the foreman of a group of Chinese railroad workers, many of whom Chin himself recruited and helped to gain passage into the United States. He first worked for Charles Crocker of the Central Pacific Railroad at Donner Pass in the Sierra Nevada Mountains of California and in then the Great Basin of Utah. He worked among hundreds of Chinese who also fled China's civil war. The transcontinental railroad was completed on May 10, 1869, at Promontory, Utah, becoming what is considered the greatest technological event of the 19th century.

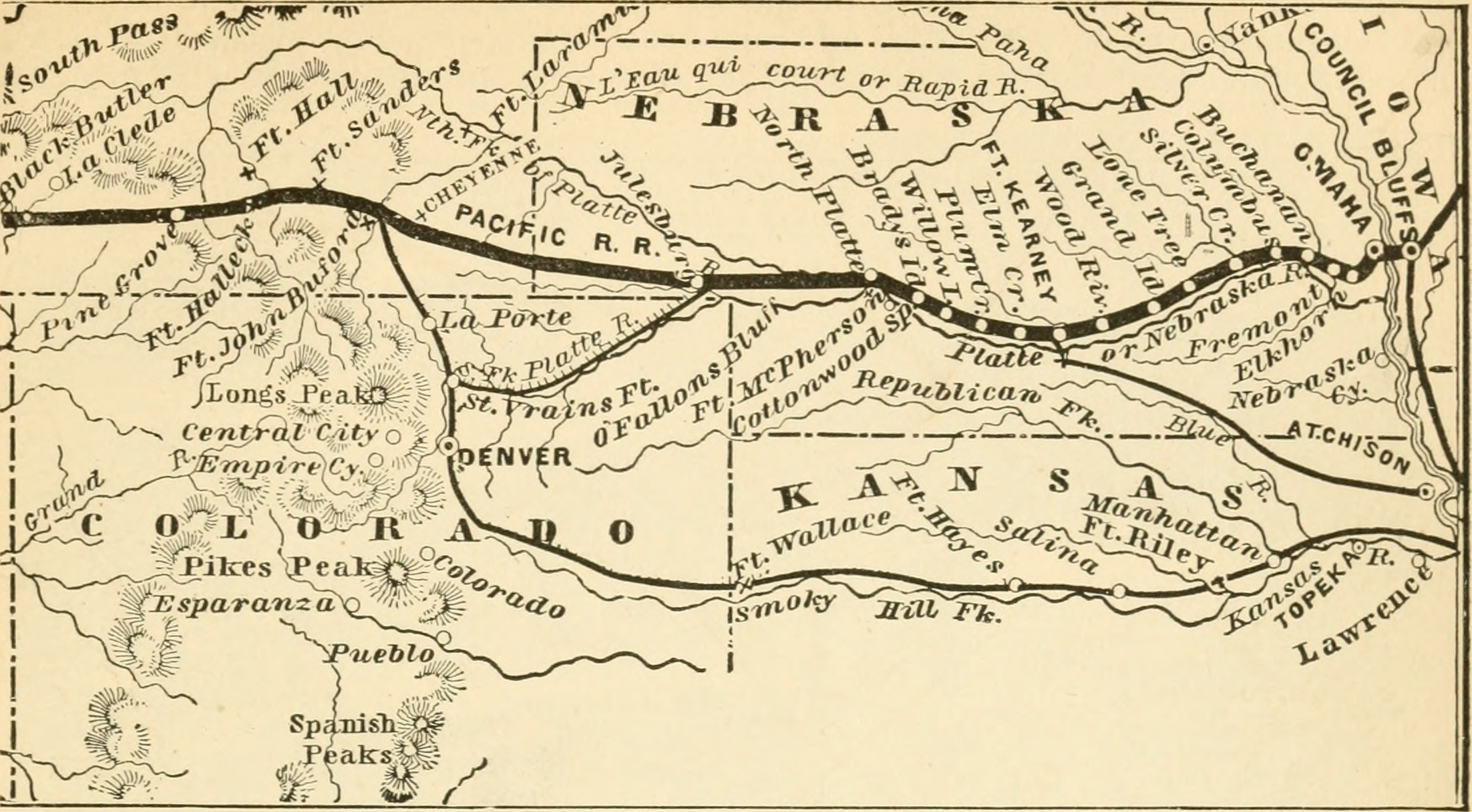
Appleton's illustrated hand-book of American cities, 1876

He worked in Nevada for the Central Pacific Railroad. Then, he worked for Gen. Grenville Dodge of the Union Pacific Railroad, which had merged with Central Pacific. Working to bring the railroad tracks to government standards, he worked in Utah, Wyoming, and Nebraska from the Rocky Mountains to the Great Plains. In Colorado, he worked for the Denver Pacific Railroad, which built a feeder line from Denver to the Union Pacific line at Cheyenne, Wyoming. With Denver connected to the transcontinental railroad, it had access to national markets and became the "Queen City of the West."

His leadership was important to the construction of the railroad. Railroad company owners hired Chinese workers because they were able to pay them less than white workers, who worked shorter days and received food rations. Hundreds of Chinese workers died from disease or injuries on the job, due to the use of explosives and as the result of mudslides and avalanches. Their work included blasting mountain sides, after which they cleared the rubble and built retention walls. At the time, there were no laws to protect railroad workers from occupational hazards.

=== Mining ===
Amongst the first Chinese pioneers in Colorado, he moved in 1871 to Black Hawk, Colorado, where he was the unofficial leader of a group of Chinese immigrants who settled in a community called Cottonwood. It may have been the first settlement of Chinese in Colorado.

He was well-paid as a mine supervisor. He managed more than 300 Chinese workers by 1874 and the crew expanded into North Clear Creek and Lower Russell Gulch. He hired Chinese workers, negotiated their wages, and drafted employment contracts with mine owners. Also a merchant, he sold them the supplies that they needed. The Chinese workers generally worked 10 hours a day, except Sundays when they worked 6 to 8 hours.

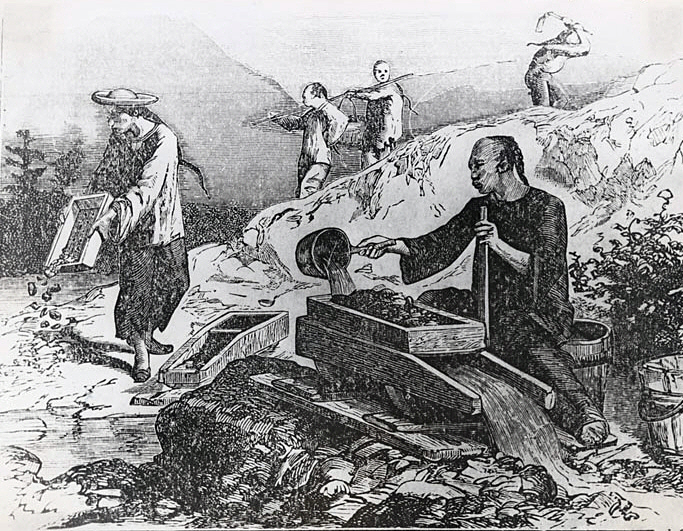
Roy D. Graves, Chinese gold miners

Chin became wealthy by buying and selling abandoned mines. Since Chinese miners could not file original claims for mines in the western United States, Chin began to work mines abandoned by whites. The Chinese specialized in placer mining that used water to collect gold from stream beds. It was a less profitable form of mining, because it was a time-intensive process to pan for residual bits of gold. He supervised hundreds of Chinese placer mines between 1870 and 1894, when he died. He and Edward L. Thayer, his mining partner, managed mines near Denver, Fairplay, Central City, and Black Hawk. They also operated supply stores in Gilpin County, Colorado. He became wealthy through the sale of two of his profitable mines. His first deposit at the National Bank in Central City was for $60,000 (equivalent to $1,612,500 in 2025).

Chin had a good reputation in the community due to "his gentlemanly and dignified deportment" and "rare skill in conducting business affairs." He was given a chair of honor at the Central City Opera House. Chin was offered the job of Central City marshal. Due to prejudice against Chinese people, he turned down the offer. He said "being Chinese gave him enough problems."

A fire in 1874 was blamed on the Chinese, the rumor being that it was started during religious ceremonies. Chin told the Central City Register newspaper that "Chinese are too frequently made the victims of circumstance which any other nationality would escape without censure, and they desire to have their side of the case represented as it is." He stated that the fire started from a chimney that had not been cleaned properly or due to a defective flue.

=== Denver ===
He moved to Denver, where Chinatown had been established by 1880. It was located between 14th and 17th Streets on Wazee. Chin continued to manage mining operations while also operating a business in Denver. He imported goods from China—like furniture, food, and clothing—that he sold in Denver. A leader within the city, he was known as the "Mayor of Chinatown."

He and other Chinese were subject to racial discrimination and violence. When the United States government passed a law that prevented Chinese immigrants from becoming citizens, it meant that they would be unable to bring a case of violence or discrimination to court. He co-founded "The Six Companies", which was a group of Chinese American business and insurance companies. He was a member of the Chee Kong Tongs, a group of Chinese who united to provide support, aid and loans for one another.

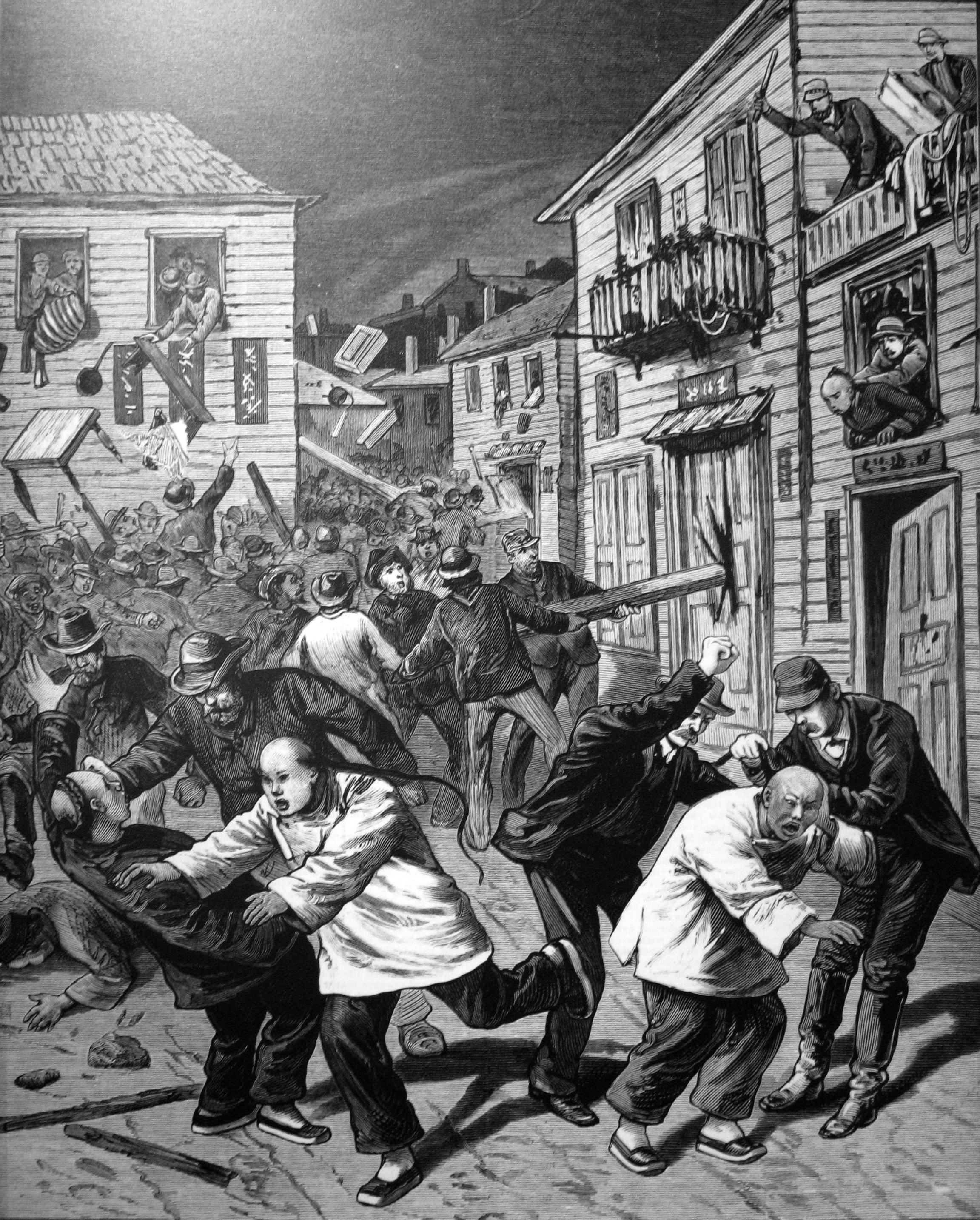
Anti-Chinese riot in Denver, 1880

On October 31, 1880, a group of white people started a riot against the Chinese. One man, Sing Lee, was murdered. Anyone that looked Chinese was attacked and Chinese businesses were destroyed. Many Chinese moved out of Denver to larger cities, like Chicago. At its height, there were more than 3,000 Chinese residents in Denver. The number of Chinese in Denver dropped from 980 in 1890, to 110 residents by 1940, and only three families later in the 1940s.

== Personal life ==
By the 1873, he had earned enough money to bring his wife over from China. They lived in Black Hawk, Fairplay, and Como. They later moved to Denver, living at 2031 Market Street.

He and his wife had six children, including Lily, Chin Mon Lung, Chin Chin Lung, Edward, and Wawa. (Note: Lily was born in Blackhawk on December 3, 1873. Willie was born in 1886 in Blackhawk.) Over time, they took on more Americanized names, including having the surname follow their first name. Chin Mong Lung became Jimmy Lin Sou, and then Jimmie Chin. Similarly, Chin Chin Lung became Willie (also William) Lin Sou, followed by Willie Chin.

Lily, their first child born in 1873 is considered the first Chinese American child born in Colorado. She married Look Wing Yuen, a rich merchant. Willie, a successful businessman, was known as the mayor of Chinatown. He raised his children to live the American lifestyle, including attaining a public education. He wanted to end a lottery that was common to the Chinese, but caused conflict with law enforcement. During World War II, Willie's sons Willie and Edward served in the United States Army Air Corps. When Willie died in 1939, Jimmy took the title of mayor of Chinatown. Jimmy ran several Chinese restaurants. Even though many Chinese had dispersed throughout Denver, he tried to maintain a Chinatown community between 20th and 21st Streets and Market and Blake Streets. This was particularly important for older members of the society who had nowhere else to go. Wawa attended the Colorado Women's College, graduating with a business degree.

Chin Lin Sou became a naturalized citizen of the United States. He died on August 10, 1894 and was buried in Denver's Riverside Cemetery, the city's oldest cemetery. He is identified as one of five influential people there. Family members had his body exhumed and transferred to China.

== Legacy ==
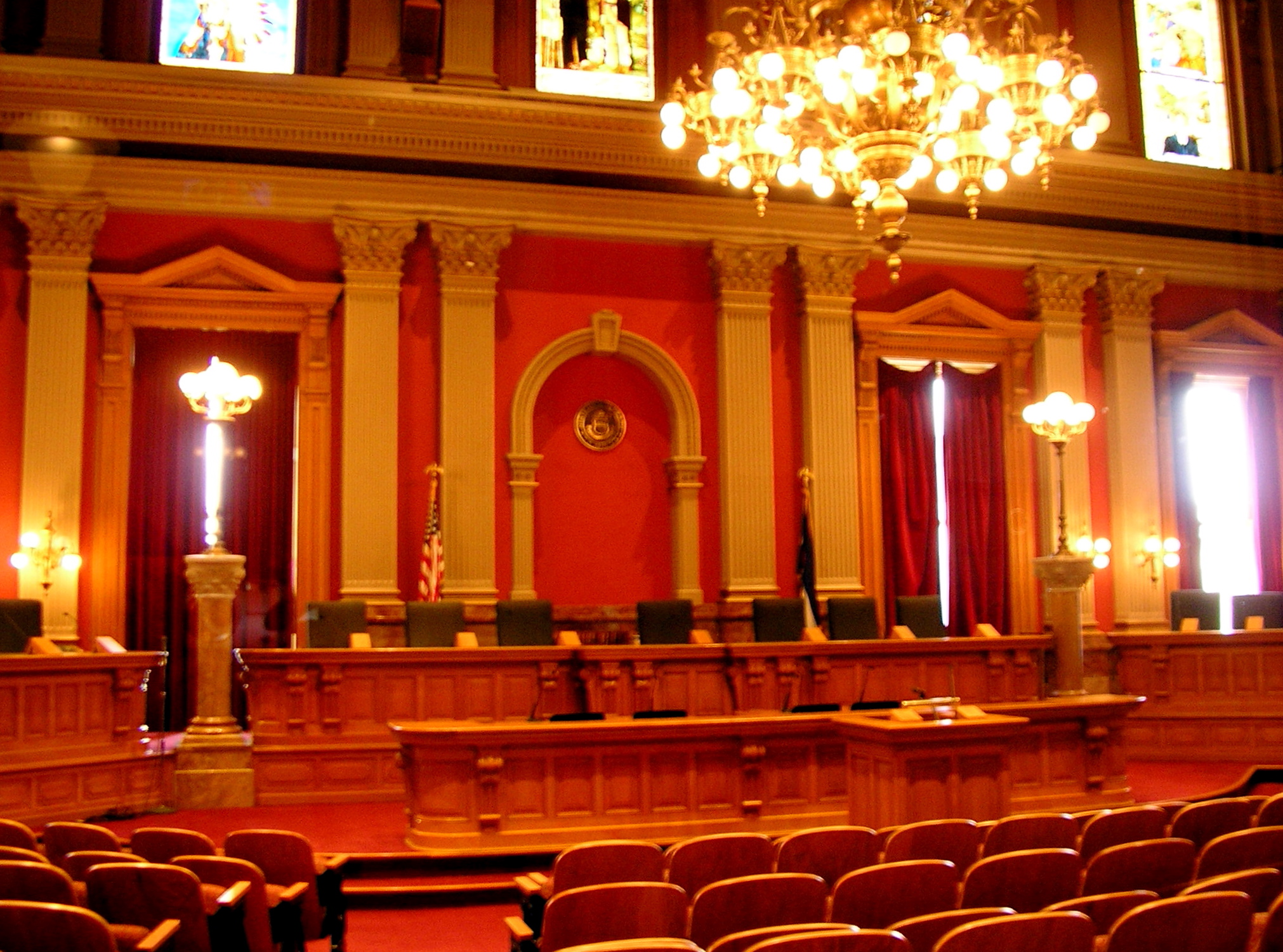
Old Supreme Court, Colorado State Capitol, showing a portion of the stain glass windows of historical Coloradans

Chin, as well as his children and descendants, became important figures in the city. A stained glass portrait of Chin was placed in the Colorado State Capitol in the old Supreme Court room in 1977 by the Ethnic Minority Council of the Colorado Centennial-Bicentennial Commission. In the portrait he was wearing a red Chinese gown, whereas Chin generally wore business suits. He is also memorialized with other pioneers on a mosaic tile wall at the Colorado Convention Center.

== See also ==
- Chinese American history

== Sources ==
- Wei, William (2016-04-05). Asians in Colorado: A History of Persecution and Perseverance in the Centennial State. University of Washington Press. ISBN 978-0-295-80636-5.
