= Andrew Hattersley =

British academic (born 1958)

Andrew Tym Hattersley CBE FRS (born 1958, London) is a Professor of Molecular Medicine at the University of Exeter and is known for his research in monogenic diabetes. He was elected a Fellow of the Royal Society in 2010. He is also an Emeritus Senior Investigator at the National Institute for Health and Care Research (NIHR).

== Education and career ==
In 1981, he received his BA from Emmanuel College, Cambridge. He received his BM BCh in 1984 and his DM in 1997, both from the University of Oxford. He did further training in diabetes at Hammersmith Hospital.

He was a lecturer at the University of Birmingham from 1993-1994, and he has worked at Exeter since 1995. He identified glucokinase as the first gene causing diabetes and has published over 500 papers on the topic of diabetes. His subsequent work has developed the understanding of MODY and the treatments and supportive therapies available.

== Awards ==
- 1998 Fellow of the Royal College of Physicians, London, UK
- 2004 Fellow of the Academy of Medical Sciences
- 2010 Fellow of the Royal Society
- 2014 Naomi Berrie Award for Outstanding Research in Diabetes
- 2015 Rolf Luft Award
- 2016 GlaxoSmithKline Prize
- 2016 EASD–Novo Nordisk Foundation Diabetes Prize for Excellence
- 2021 Harold Hamm International Prize for Biomedical Research in Diabetes

== Honours ==
Hattersley was appointed Commander of the Order of the British Empire (CBE) in the 2017 Birthday Honours for services to medical science.
