= Philippa Marrack =

English biologist and immunologist

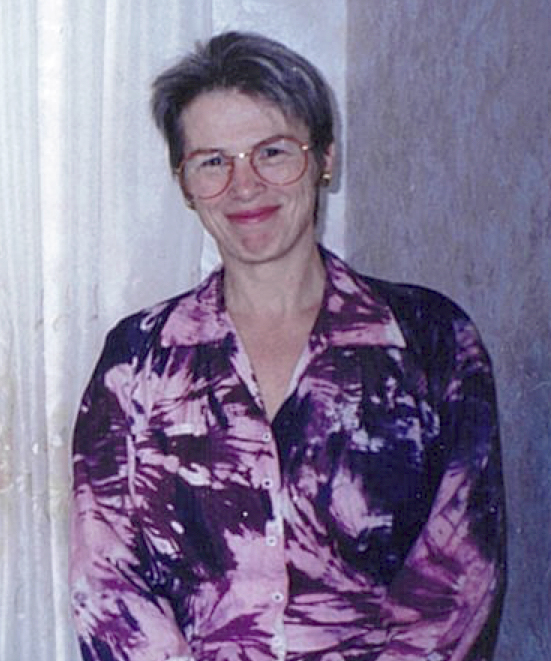
- Born: 28 June 1945 (age 81); Ewell, England
- Other name: Pippa Marrack
- Education: New Hall, Cambridge (University of Cambridge) (M.A., Ph.D)
- Known for: discovery of T cell receptor, discovery of superantigens, T cells, autoimmune disease
- Spouse: John W. Kappler
- Awards: Member, National Academy of Sciences (1989); Louisa Gross Horwitz Prize (1995); Dickson Prize (1996); Fellow, Royal Society (1997); L'Oréal-UNESCO Award for Women in Science (2004); National Women's Hall of Fame (2015); Wolf Prize in Medicine (2015)
- Scientific career
- Fields: Immunology
- Workplaces: University of California, San Diego; University of Rochester; National Jewish Health; University of Colorado Denver; HHMI; MRC Laboratory of Molecular Biology
- Doctoral advisor: Alan Munro
- Website: KM lab website

Philippa Marrack, FRS (born 28 June 1945) is an English immunologist and academic, based in the United States, best known for her research and discoveries pertaining to T cells. Marrack is the Ida and Cecil Green Professor and chair of the Department of Biomedical Research at National Jewish Health and a distinguished professor of immunology and microbiology at the University of Colorado Denver.

== Biography ==
Marrack was born in Ewell, England on 28 June 1945. Born in England, she maintains her British and American citizenship currently. Marrack's father served in the Royal Navy, so her family moved frequently throughout her childhood. Marrack notes that the longest she lived in one place during her early years was in Cambridge where she began pursuing her undergraduate degree. After attending Cambridge University, Marrack moved to the United States to complete postdoctoral work and research. In the United States she met her lifelong partner and husband, John W. Kappler. They have completed much research and accomplished many advancements in the fields of immunology, biochemistry, and molecular biology. Marrack and Kappler have two children together. Outside of science, Philippa Marrack enjoys playing the piano, as well as running along the Platte River with her Labradors.

== Education ==
Marrack completed both undergraduate (1967) and Ph.D. (1970) at Cambridge University in New Hall, Cambridge. During her Ph.D., Marrack worked at the MRC Laboratory of Molecular Biology with Alan Munro, where she began to study the differences between T cells and B cells. Alan Munro became her thesis advisor; she became the graduate student that worked with him due to his interest in working with a relative of John Marrack. John Marrack was Philippa Marrack's grandfather's brother, and a very well-known immunologist in the 1930s. Marrack notes that he indirectly influenced her to pursue the study of immunology.

Marrack then moved to La Jolla, San Diego with her first husband and completed postdoctoral work with Richard Dutton at the University of California, San Diego. She credits Dutton as having a tremendous impact on her career during her fellowship, as he taught her how to write, lecture, and run a lab, as well as how to think critically.

== Career ==
Marrack met her lifelong partner and current husband, John W. Kappler, as a postdoctoral fellow at the University of California, San Diego. Her first faculty position was at the University of Rochester, where she taught an undergraduate immunology course. The pair launched a joint lab at the University of Rochester. At the same time, she received independent funding from the American Heart Association and American Cancer Society to study T cells. Marrack obtained an associate professorship at the University of Rochester, followed by faculty positions at the National Jewish Health, Denver, Colorado and the University of Colorado Denver. She was also a Howard Hughes Medical Institute investigator. Throughout her career, Marrack has published over 300 peer-reviewed journal articles. Her numerous citations and journal articles places her as the third most influential researcher in the nation and distinguishes her as top female researcher.

== Research interests ==
In 1983, while working in the labs at the National Jewish Health in Denver, Colorado, Philippa Marrack and her husband and research partner, John Kappler, discovered and isolated the T cell receptor, together with Ellis Reinherz and James Allison. Later in 1987 resulting from this research, Marrack discovered how the immune system is capable of molecular discrimination, as the human body can get rid of T cells that target the body's own tissues, destroying them in the thymus before they have a chance to cause problems, yet the body retains the cells that combat invaders. She learned that destructive cells that fail to be destroyed can cause autoimmune diseases like Type 1 diabetes, Multiple sclerosis, and lupus. This foundational work on immunological tolerance by Marrack and Kappler led to their later discovery in 1990 of superantigens: powerful toxins that stimulate a large amounts of T-cell proliferation and can cause devastating immune response and violent symptoms such as those seen in toxic shock syndrome or food poisoning. Marrack's current research projects focus on why certain autoimmune diseases, like lupus or Multiple sclerosis, are more prevalent in women than in men. Marrack and Kappler have recently discovered a population of B cells that may account for some of this observation. Her pioneering and revolutionary work isolating the T-cell receptor and describing how T cells protect against infection, drive autoimmune and allergic diseases, and play a possible role in rejection of cancers, has contributed greatly to the current understanding of vaccines, HIV, and immune disorders in the medical field.

== Professional activities ==
Marrack has served on editorial boards and many scientific journals including Cell, Science, and the Journal of Immunology. She has also served on various boards and panels for the American Cancer Society, the National Institutes of Health, and the Burroughs Welcome Fund. From 1986 to 2017, Marrack was a Howard Hughes Medical Institute investigator. From 1995 to 2002, Marrack served on the American Association of Immunologists Council and served as president of the American Association of Immunologists (AAI) from 2000 to 2001. She has been a member of the National Academy of Sciences in the United States since 1989, and a Fellow of the Royal Society in Great Britain since 1997. She is also the current Ida and Cecil Green professor and chair of the Department of Biomedical Research at National Jewish Health and a distinguished professor at the University of Colorado Denver. She joined the faculties of National Jewish Health and the University of Colorado Health Sciences Center in 1979.

== Honors and awards ==
- 1990 – Feodor Lynen Medal for Special Achievement and Distinguished Service
- 1990 – Royal Society Wellcome Foundation Prize
- 1991 – Elected to the American Academy of Arts and Sciences
- 1992 – The Ernst W. Bertner Memorial Award (MD Anderson Cancer Center)
- 1993 – Cancer Research Institute William B. Coley Award
- 1993 – Paul Ehrlich and Ludwig Darmstaedter Prize
- 1994 – Louisa Gross Horwitz Prize (Columbia University)
- 1995 – Behring-Heidelberger Lecture Award
- 1995 – FASEB Excellence in Science Award
- 1995 – The Louisa Gross Horwitz Prize (Columbia University)
- 1996 – Dickson Prize in Medicine (University of Pittsburgh)
- 1996 – Honorary Doctorate of Sciences, Macalester College
- 1998 – The Rabbi Shai Shacknai Memorial Prize
- 1999 – Interscience Conference on Antimicrobial Agents and Chemotherapy Award
- 1999 – Howard Taylor Ricketts Prize (University of Chicago)
- 2000 – Lifetime Achievement Award, American Association of Immunologists
- 2001 – Irvington Institute Scientific Leadership Award in Immunology
- 2002 – Fellow, The Academy of Medical Sciences
- 2003 – American Association of Immunologists Lifetime Achievement Award
- 2003 – Faculty Ambassador Award, National Jewish Health
- 2004 – Bonfils Stanton Award for Science
- 2004 – L'Oreal UNESCO Women in Science Award
- 2004 – National Jewish Health Abraham J. Kauvar Presidential Award
- 2004 – University of Colorado Health Sciences Center, School of Medicine, Mentoring Award
- 2005 – Pearl Meister Greengard Prize
- 2006 – Avery-Landsteiner Prize
- 2008 – Elected member, National Academy of Medicine
- 2010 – Inducted into the Colorado Women's Hall of Fame
- 2015 – Wolf Prize in Medicine
- 2015 – Inducted into the National Women's Hall of Fame
- 2016 – Novartis Prize for Basic Immunology
- 2019 – Clarivate Citation Laureate
- 2024 - Recipient of an honorary degree from Rockefeller University
