= St Bartholomew's School =

St. Bartholomew's School

Location
- Andover Road; Newbury, Berkshire, RG14 6JP; England; 51.392°N 1.332°W

Information
- Type: Academy
- Motto: Ad lucem (Towards the light)
- Established: 1466; 560 years ago
- Founder: Henry Wormestall
- Specialist: Business and Enterprise College
- Department for Education URN: 137465 Tables
- Ofsted: Reports
- Headteacher: David Fitter
- Gender: Coeducational
- Age: 11 to 18
- Enrolment: 1,909
- Houses: Curnock; Davis; Evers; Patterson
- Colour: Purple (school colour)
- Publication: BartholoNews
- Former pupils: Old Newburians
- GCSE results: 466.9 points/student
- Website: www.stbarts.co.uk

St. Bartholomew's School (known colloquially as St Bart's) has been a non-selective local comprehensive school since 1975. It is a co-educational state funded academy school whose predecessor schools were founded in 1466 in Newbury, Berkshire in the United Kingdom. It accepts students aged 11–18 within its local geographical catchment area, and has approximately 1,970 students on roll, including a sixth form of around 620. It is currently rated by Ofsted as "Outstanding".

== House system ==
The school operates a house system whereby the student body is divided into four houses, each named for a former pupil who died in the First World War:

- George Ashwin Curnock - Green
- Alexander Herbert Davis - Red
- Bertram Saxelbye Evers - Blue
- Robert Arthur Patterson - Yellow

Students from each house enter into annual competitions in sport and the arts versus the other houses, where pupils represent their house. Examples of House Sports competitions are house netball, house football, house rugby, house lacrosse, house hockey, house tennis, house rounders. There are also House arts events including dance, fine arts, drama and music; there are also House filmmaking and House Drama plays which are written by year 12 students (aged 16 and 17) and performed by year 10 students (aged 14 and 15). The winning house in each competition is awarded a certain number of points, which are accrued during the academic year.

== Facilities ==
=== The Ad Lucem project ===
Before the Ad Lucem project, St Bartholomew's School was based on two sites. The Luker site, at one end of Buckingham Road was formerly Newbury County Girls' Grammar School. The Wormestall site, at the opposite end of Buckingham Road, was formerly St Bartholomew's Boys' Grammar School - the two grammar schools had merged in 1975 to form a large comprehensive, spread over both sites.

On 23 November 2006, St. Bartholomew's was awarded a government grant to rebuild its premises. The school was chosen ahead of three other schools in Berkshire: Kennet School, Theale Green Community School, and John O'Gaunt Community Technology College. Whilst several proposals for St. Bartholomew's were considered, the final application involved completely rebuilding the school, with access provided through Fifth Road. This application was approved by a West Berkshire Council Planning Committee on 20 February 2008. The rebuild was completed in October 2010, and was officially opened on 30 March 2011 by the Countess of Wessex.

Both former sites enjoyed large playing fields, tennis courts and sports changing rooms. Most of this space was lost as a result of the building of the new school. The new school still retains a large playing field, and since the completion of phase two of the Ad Lucem project possesses a sizeable Multi-Use Games Area. In January 2014 the planned extension to the Patterson block was complete, allowing more space for the Sixth Form and a much expanded hall.

=== Facilities ===
- Phase one of the Ad Lucem project was completed in October 2010, meaning that the school is now on one site, with an entrance from Buckingham Road, adjacent to the old Luker site.
- In January 2014 the planned extension to the Patterson block was complete, allowing more space for the sixth form and an expanded hall.
- In early 2019, the Wormestall 6th Form Block was extended with a new Wormestall Conference Room and smaller Wormestall meeting room. These rooms were designed to accommodate more exam students during exam season. The rooms also act as new meeting rooms, meaning that the 6th Form has now been able to expand into two rooms previously used for meetings on the ground floor of the main block, while the new rooms are used for meetings. This development has allowed the 6th form to continue to expand. These rooms are also hired out by the school.
- The new school retains a large playing field, and since the completion of phase two of the Ad Lucem project possesses a sizeable Multi-Use Games Area.
- There is a large hall with a temporary stage, where assemblies and some lessons take place. Larger, whole school assemblies take place in the 'Hub', a central atrium at the heart of the building.

== History ==
The school was founded in 1466 from the legacy of Henry Wormestall who set aside £12 2s 4d annually for "teching gramar scole of the whiche that toune hath grete nede". St. Bartholomew's is therefore thought to be the 42nd oldest school in the UK still in existence.

- 1466 Male-only St. Bartholomew's Boys' Grammar School founded in a building near the junction of Pound Street and Bartholomew Street. Moved to Wormestall around 1880.
- 1904 Female-only Newbury County Girls Grammar School founded at the Newbury Technical Institute site in Northbrook Street.
- 1910 Female-only Newbury County Girls Grammar School moved to the Luker site on the Andover Road.
- 1966 The school celebrates quincentenary. School Pageant attended by Agatha Christie.
- 26 May 1972 Visit by Queen Elizabeth II, who opens Luker Hall.
- 1975 Newbury County Girls' Grammar School and St. Bartholomew's Boys' Grammar School merge to form the present-day comprehensive school.
- 1993 School receives second visit from Queen Elizabeth II
- September 2002 School designated as a Business and Enterprise College – a specialist school status
- 22 November 2010, opening of the new St. Bartholomew's School buildings for academic purposes.
- 30 March 2011, official opening of the new St Bartholomew's School building
- 1 September 2011, St Bartholomew's School gains academy status

=== Narrative history ===
The earliest mention of an established grammar school in Newbury is in 1548 when the school is recorded as being at the Litten Chapel, part of St Bartholomew's hospital. The hospital was established in the late 12th century and by 1548 had been affected by the dissolution of the monasteries. A cloth merchant, Henry Wormestall in a 1466 will bequeathed funding to pay for a teacher. The school took its name from the hospital and remained at the Litten for centuries. In the 16th century Newbury was well known for its cloth. The only headteacher known during the next 300 years is Thomas Parker, head teacher in 1630. In 1634 he left and led 100 Wiltshire men to found the town of Newbury, Massachusetts on the estuary of what became the Parker river on America's east coast, near Boston. He continued teaching there until his death in 1677. Part of this town of Newbury split off and became Newburyport in 1764.

The school survived the Civil wars including the two battles of Newbury, but declined as its funds were appropriated by the unreformed corporation in the late 18th century, and in the early nineteenth century it closed. In 1849 a new body of trustees rebuilt the Litten and revived the school which opened with 60 boys. The headmaster was Henry Newport. In 1876 the headmaster was the Rev. J. Atkins. In 1885 the charity commissioners agreed to the provision of new buildings in Enborne Road, for 150 pupils including 20 boarders. In 1902 the Rev. Atkins retired and was replaced by Edward Sharwood-Smith.

Sharwood-Smith retired in 1924 and in 1925 was replaced by the Rev. T. Rutherford-Harley. He led the school through World War II and in 1948 was replaced by J. Andrew Ballantyne. In 1960 Ballantyne retired and was replaced by Basil E.D. Cooper. In 1968 the boarding house closed and in 1975 he was to take over running of the comprehensive school, formed by the merging of the boys' grammar school with the girls' high school at the other end of Buckingham Road.

The Newbury girls grammar school opened in 1904 in the technical institute in Northbrook Street. Esther Jane Luker was the first headmistress. In 1910 the girls' school moved to purpose-built premises in Andover Road with 250 pupils. After World War II Miss Ireland became headmistress in 1945. She retired in 1968 and was replaced by Miss Gray who carried on till the merger with the boys' grammar school in 1975 when, Basil Cooper became headmaster of the combined comprehensive school.

The comprehensive school formed in 1975 took over the name of St Bartholomew's School together with its motto. Initially the school used the previous buildings, with the boys' grammar school buildings given the name of Wormestall, while the girls' high school buildings took on the name of Luker. In 1985 Basil Cooper retired and was replaced by Robert Mermagen. In 1994 he too retired and was replaced by Stuart Robinson. In 2009 he was replaced by Christina Haddrell but stayed on to cover the transfer to new school buildings in 2010. These were built between the sites of the two previous schools on Buckingham Road, but nearer the old girls' High School on the south-west side of Fifth Road. Both of the previous school buildings were converted into private flats. In 2011 the school gained academy status. In 2014 Mrs Haddrell retired and was replaced by Julia Mortimore. In 2022 Ms Mortimore retired and was replaced Dr David Fitter. St. Bartholomew's is one of only a few state schools to participate in the Combined Cadet Force (a programme sponsored by the Ministry of Defence), with around 200 cadets between the ages of 14 and 18.

== Ofsted inspections ==
The school was last inspected by Ofsted in January 2026. It received 'Strong Standard' in three areas and 'Expected Standard' in four others including for attendance and behaviour and curriculum and teaching. The previous October 2021 inspection conducted under Ms Mortimore's headship saw the school rated rated 'outstanding'. The school notably achieved 'outstanding' in all categories of inspection. The previous 2015 report and further short inspection in 2018 had rated the school as 'good'.

== Alumni ==
The alumni of St. Bartholomew's are referred to as Old Newburians and include:

- Arron Banks - businessman, and pro-Brexit political donor
- Lauren Bell - cricketer
- Fiona Button, actress
- Arthur Haddy - sound engineer
- Ollie Hassell-Collins - rugby player
- Baroness Sue Hayman (née Bentley) - previously Labour MP for Workington in Cumbria, elected 2015
- Richard Houlston - Fellow of the Royal Society
- Hollie McNish (aka Hollie Poetry) - poet
- Keston Sutherland - poet
- John Edwin Midwinter – President of the Institution of Electrical Engineers
- Robert Newton – actor, perhaps best known for his portrayal of Long John Silver in the 1950 film version of Treasure Island
- Sir Denys Page – classicist
- David Quarrey - UK Deputy National Security Adviser and former British Ambassador to Israel.
- Sir Anthony Skingsley - former RAF commander and Air chief marshal.
- Jon Solly – former long-distance runner, won gold medal in 10,000 metres event at 1986 Commonwealth Games
- Herbert Akroyd Stuart – inventor, noted for his invention of the Hot bulb engine.
- Lord Simon Stevens - Chief Executive of the NHS
- Jack Thorne – writer of The Fades, Enola Holmes, showrunner of His Dark Materials, contributing writer for Skins and Shameless
- Lucy Worsley – historian, curator, and television presenter

== See also ==
- List of schools in the United Kingdom
- List of the oldest schools in the United Kingdom
- Specialist school
