= John Kappler =

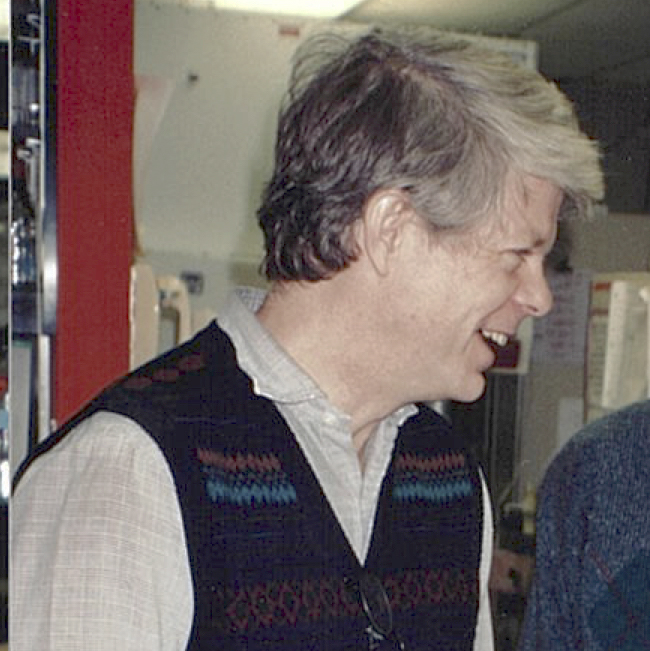
- Born: December 22, 1943 (age 82); Baltimore, MD
- Education: Lehigh University, BA, chemistry; Brandeis University, PhD, biochemistry
- Known for: discovery of T cell receptor
- Awards: Wolf Prize in Medicine, 2015
- Scientific career
- Workplaces: National Jewish Health; HHMI
- Website: KM lab website

John Wayne Kappler (born December 22, 1943, in Baltimore, Maryland) is a professor in the Department of Integrated Immunology at National Jewish Health. His principal research is in T cell biology, a subject he collaborates on with his wife Philippa Marrack. In 1983 they discovered the T cell receptor, together with Ellis Reinherz and James Allison.

== Awards ==
- 1986 – Appointed investigator, Howard Hughes Medical Institute
- 1989 – Elected member, National Academy of Sciences
- 1993 – Cancer Research Institute William B. Coley Award
- 1993 - Paul Ehrlich and Ludwig Darmstaedter Prize
- 1994 – Louisa Gross Horwitz Prize for Biology or Biochemistry (Columbia University)
- 2015 – Wolf Prize in Medicine
