= David C. Rubinsztein =

British medical researcher (born 1963)

David Rubinsztein
- Born: David Chaim Rubinsztein; 1963 (age 62–63)
- Education: University of Cape Town (MBChB, PhD)
- Known for: autophagy and polyglutamine expansions
- Awards: Fellow of the Academy of Medical Sciences (2004); EMBO Member (2011); Fellow of the Royal Society (2017); Prix Roger de Spoelberch (2017)
- Scientific career
- Fields: Autophagy; Neurodegenerative diseases
- Workplaces: University of Cambridge; Cambridge Institute for Medical Research; Cambridge Drug Discovery Institute
- Thesis: Monogenic hypercholesterolemia in South Africans: familial hypercholesterolemia in Indians and familial defective apolipoprotein B-100 (1993)
- Doctoral advisor: Prof. D.R. van der Westhuyzen
- Website: cimr.cam.ac.uk/research/principal-investigators/principal-investigators-q-z/rubinsztein; www.neuroscience.cam.ac.uk/directory/profile.php?dcr1000

David Chaim Rubinsztein (born 1963) is based in the Cambridge Institute of Medical Research (CIMR), where he was Deputy Director from 2012-2025. He is Professor of Molecular Neurogenetics at the University of Cambridge and a UK Dementia Research Institute Group Leader.

== Education ==
Rubinsztein completed his Bachelor of Medicine, Bachelor of Surgery (MB ChB) in 1986 and PhD in 1993 in the Medical Research Council/University of Cape Town Unit for the Cell Biology of Atherosclerosis. In 1993 he went to Cambridge as a senior registrar in Genetic Pathology.

== Career ==
In 1997, Rubinsztein acquired his Certificate of Completion of Specialist Training at the University of Cambridge. He was appointed to a Personal Readership at the University of Cambridge in 2003. In 2005, he was promoted to Professor of Molecular Neurogenetics at the University of Cambridge (personal chair). He has been an author on more than 400 scientific papers, and was ranked as the 4th most cited European author from 2007 to 2013 in cell biology. Rubinsztein has been invited to give talks at major international conferences, including Gordon Research Conferences and Keystone Symposia.

== Research ==
Rubinsztein has made major contributions to the field of neurodegeneration with his laboratory's discovery that autophagy regulates the levels of intracytoplasmic aggregate-prone proteins that cause many neurodegenerative diseases, including Huntington's, Parkinson's and Alzheimer's disease. His lab has found that autophagy may be inhibited in various neurodegenerative diseases and has elucidated the pathological consequences of autophagy compromise. In addition his research has advanced the basic understanding of autophagy, identifying the plasma membrane as a source of autophagosome membrane and characterising early events in autophagosome biogenesis. Furthermore, he studied how lysosomal positioning regulates autophagy. His goal is to understand the links between these diseases and autophagy. He is currently focused on understanding how to induce autophagy in vivo to remove toxic proteins and avoid the development of neurodegenerative disease

=== Honours and awards ===
Rubinsztein has won numerous awards including:

- 1997 Glaxo-Wellcome Fellowship
- 2001 Medical Research Council (MRC) Programme grant, Wellcome Trust Senior Clinical Fellowship
- 2004 Elected a Fellow of the Academy of Medical Sciences (FMedSci)
- 2005 Professor of Molecular Neurogenetics, University of Cambridge
- 2006 MRC Programme grant, Wellcome Trust Senior Clinical Fellowship
- 2007 Graham Bull Prize for Clinical Science by the Royal College of Physicians
- 2011 Member of the European Molecular Biology Organization (EMBO)
- 2012 Wellcome Trust Principal Fellowship
- 2012 Deputy Director of Cambridge Institute for Medical Research, University of Cambridge
- 2014 Thomson Reuters Highly Cited Researcher for 2014 in the categories Biology and Biochemistry and Molecular Biology and Genetics
- 2015 Thomson Reuters Highly Cited Researcher for 2015 in the categories Biology and Biochemistry
- 2015 Academic Lead of ARUK Cambridge Drug Discovery Institute
- 2015 4th highest cited cell biologist in Europe and Israel for articles published between 2007 and 2013
- 2016 Awarded Thudichum Medal from Biochemical Society for 2017
- 2017 Elected a Fellow of the Royal Society
- 2017 UK Dementia Research Institute Professor
- 2018 Awarded Prix Roger de Spoelberch for 2017
- 2018 Clarivate Analytics Highly Cited Researcher for 2018
- 2019 Clarivate Analytics Highly Cited Researcher for 2019
- 2020 Awarded Goudie Medal and lecture from Pathological Society of Great Britain & Ireland
- 2020 Clarivate Analytics Highly Cited Researcher 2020
- 2021 Clarivate Analytics Highly Cited Researcher 2021
- 2022 Elected member of Academia Europaea, The Academy of Europe
- 2022 Clarivate Analytics Highly Cited Researcher 2022
- 2023 Clarivate Analytics Highly Cited Researcher 2023
- 2024 American Academy of Neurology Movement Disorders Research Award
- 2024 Clarivate Analytics Highly Cited Researcher 2024
