= National Jewish Health =

Hospital for research and treatment center for respiratory disorders

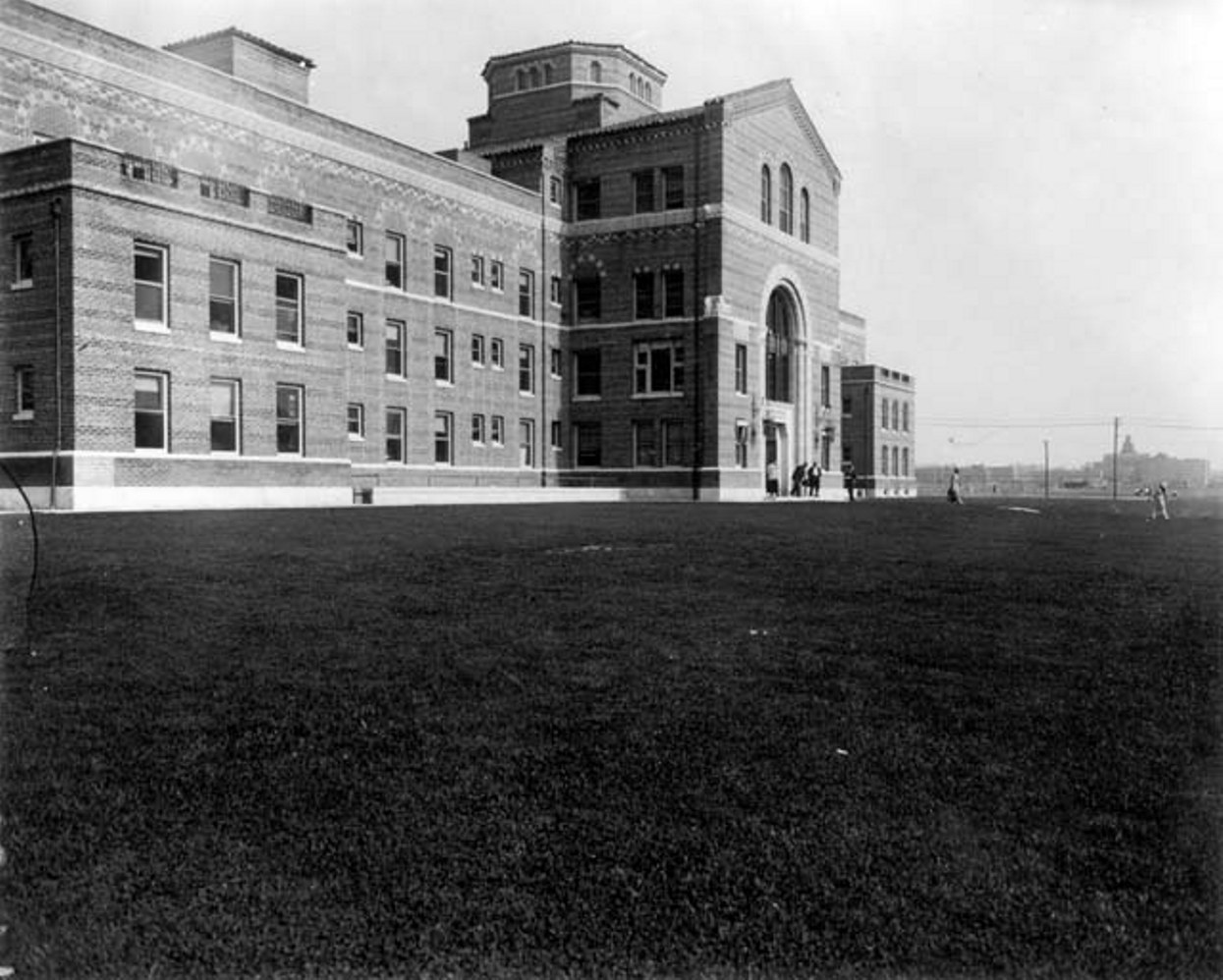
- National Jewish Health, circa 1920.

Geography
- Location: 1400 Jackson Street, Denver, Colorado, United States
- Coordinates: 39°44′21″N 104°56′32″W

Organization
- Care system: Private, non-profit
- Type: Specialist
- Affiliated university: University of Colorado Denver

Services
- Emergency department: N/A
- Beds: 46
- Speciality: respiratory care

History
- Founded: 1899

Links
- Website: www.nationaljewish.org
- Lists: Hospitals in Colorado

National Jewish Health is an American academic hospital/clinic in Denver, Colorado, doing research and treatment in respiratory, cardiac, immune and related disorders. It is an internationally respected medical center that draws people from many countries to receive care. Founded in 1899 to treat tuberculosis, it is non-sectarian but had funding from B'nai B'rith until the 1950s.

The hospital, originally named as the National Jewish Hospital for Consumptives has been renamed many times, including as National Jewish Hospital (1925–1964), National Jewish Hospital and Research Center (1965–1977), National Jewish Hospital and Research Center/National Asthma Center (following a 1978 merger with the National Asthma Center), National Jewish Center for Immunology and Respiratory Medicine (1986–1996). and National Jewish Medical and Research Center (1997–2008). In July 2008, it was renamed National Jewish Health.

== Tuberculosis brings people to Colorado ==
By the late 19th century, Colorado and the American Southwest had become famous for the health benefits of a dry, sunny climate. At that time, the only known treatment for tuberculosis was clean air and sunshine and hundreds of people with tuberculosis descended upon Denver in hopes of finding a miracle cure for what was then the nation's leading cause of death. Consequently, many people with tuberculosis spent their last dollars coming to Colorado. By the 1890s, it was estimated that one out of every three residents of the state was there for respiratory reasons. However, no facilities existed to provide treatment or shelter to these victims. In Denver, victims of tuberculosis were literally dying in the streets as boarding houses often banned "lungers," as they were called.

== Planning and building, 1893 ==
It was obvious that the Denver community at large was not sympathetic to the plight of tuberculosis sufferers, and many, including prominent Denver resident Frances Wisebart Jacobs stated that "we can't blacken the name of the city" by making it a refuge for those with tuberculosis.

Frances Wisebart Jacobs, known as "Mother of Charities", recognized the need for a tuberculosis hospital. After joining forces with a young rabbi, William S. Friedman, the two raised enough money to buy some land and erect a building.

On October 9, 1892, the hospital's cornerstone was laid and drew huge crowds. "The exercises yesterday were attended by several thousand people of all denominations, and the cable and electric car lines were taxed to full capacity, while the route to the site was lined with carriages."

The original hospital was completed (but not yet opened) in 1893 and was to be named the "Francis Wisebart Jacobs Hospital" after its founder, but she died of pneumonia before the hospital opened.

Due to the combination of the "Silver Crisis of 1893" and a national depression, the hospital did not open and sat vacant for six years until Rabbi Friedman approached B'nai B'rith, a national Jewish organization, and persuaded them to raise the required operating funds on an annual basis.

== Early operation 1899-1950s ==
When the hospital opened on December 10, 1899, it had a new name; National Jewish Hospital for Treatment of Consumptives (consumption is an old name for tuberculosis that describes how the contagious illness wastes away or consumes its victims). B'nai B'rith continued to support the hospital until the early 1950s.

Despite its name, National Jewish treats all comers and emphasizes giving care to those who can't pay. At the ground-breaking on October 9, 1892, it was noted that "…[Pain] knows no creed, so is this building the prototype of the grand idea of Judaism, which casts aside no stranger no matter of what race or blood. We consecrate this structure to humanity, to our suffering fellowman, regardless of creed." National Jewish adopted the motto: "None may enter who can pay – none can pay who enter" The hospital opened with a capacity of 60 patients with the goal of treating 150 patients a year.

In the beginning, a six-month limit on patient stays was imposed and only patients in the early stages of tuberculosis were to be accepted. In reality, however, many chronic sufferers were admitted and, after a few months, they lifted the six-month limit.

Treatment of tuberculosis at the National Jewish Hospital for Consumptives was in line with other turn-of-the-20th-century sanatoria: plenty of fresh air, plenty of food, moderate exercise, and close scrutiny of every aspect of patients' lives. Good food was very apropos: even today poor nutrition is a risk factor for tuberculosis.

Patients could expect to sleep outside, or with their heads outside, every night, and were all but gorged with food. In 1911, the annual report records that $3,631 was spent on eggs (roughly $94,888.89 in 2016) for just 120 patients.

== Asthma and allergies, 1950s- present time ==
In the mid-1950s National Jewish Hospital maintained its tuberculosis work and built on its pulmonary focus to branch out into asthma and related respiratory ailments. About mid-century, the hospital had the nation's only large inpatient program for adults with asthma; a pediatric program was added in the 1960s.

In 1978, the hospital, then called the National Jewish Hospital and Research Center, merged with the National Asthma Center (NAC). The NAC had originally been founded in 1907 as a home for Jewish children of tuberculosis patients, changed its name in 1928 to the National Home for Jewish Children in Denver, in 1953 to the Jewish National Home for Asthmatic Children at Denver and in 1957 to the Children's Asthma Research Institute and Hospital (CARIH). In 1973, the name National Asthma Center was adopted. At the time of the merger, it was a national residential treatment facility for children with intractable asthma and a research hospital.

== Present mission ==
National Jewish Health has no formal ties to any religious or quasi-religious institution and gets no funding from B'nai B'rith. Until 1968, the institution only accepted patients without health insurance; all care was free.

U.S. News & World Report has ranked National Jewish Health as #1 or #2 every year that the pulmonology category has been included in the rankings (since 1997). Of those years, National Jewish Health has been ranked in the #1 spot for 17 of those years as the leading U.S. respiratory hospital.

Current departments include:

- Allergy
- Asthma
- Behavioral Health
- Cardiology
- Environmental and Occupational Health
- Gastroenterology
- Immunology
- Mycobacterial and Infectious Disease
- Oncology
- Pathology
- Pulmonology
- Radiology
- Rheumatology
- Sleep Medicine

The hospital operates Morgridge Academy on its main campus for kindergarten through eighth-grade children who are challenged with chronic illness. The smoking cessation program has helped millions of people via internet and phone to quit tobacco.

These are among National Jewish's collaborations with health care institutions:

- Saint Joseph Hospital, Denver
- Mount Sinai – National Jewish Health Respiratory Institute, New York
- Jane and Leonard Korman Respiratory Institute, Philadelphia

The hospital also has a Center for Post-COVID Care and Recovery. This provides multidisciplinary support for patients suffering from long-term symptoms of COVID-19.

== People ==
- Rabbi William S. Friedman
- Frances Wisebart Jacobs
- Kimishige Ishizaka, PhD and his wife Teruko Ishizaka MD
- John Kappler, PhD
- Philippa Marrack, PhD
- Seraphine Eppstein Pisko
- Cecile Rose, MD
- Andrew Speaker

== Accomplishments ==
- Ranked as one of the top two hospitals in pulmonology every year since U.S. News & World Report included this category in its annual “Best Hospitals” survey
- Ranked in the top 1 percent of hospitals in the nation by HCAHPS
- Among the top 8 percent of organizations funded for research by the NIH, providing patients access to the latest clinical trials

== See also ==
- Asthma
- Atopic dermatitis
- COPD
- Cystic fibrosis
- NTM
- Tuberculosis management
