= Jewish Outlook =

American newspaper (1903–1913)

The Jewish Outlook was an American weekly newspaper that was published in Denver, Colorado from 1903 to 1913. It was the first Jewish-affiliated newspaper published in Colorado and the unofficial organ of the National Jewish Hospital. The Outlook opposed both Zionism and Orthodox Judaism.

Its first publisher was Samuel Priess. In the paper's early years, Rabbi William S. Friedman of Temple Emanuel was editor. Friedman was also a founder of National Jewish Hospital.

The Outlook regularly criticized the Jewish Consumptives' Relief Society (JCRS), which was founded in 1904 by Jewish leaders in Denver's Eastern European community, including Dr. Charles David Spivak, who later became the first editor of the Denver Jewish News. In an opinion piece for the Outlook, Friedman criticized JCRS's plan to "help anyone afflicted with this dread disease and sent to Colorado" as "quixotic and chimerical" as well as "unwise and ill-advised."

In 1907, Rabbi Montague N.A. Cohen of Temple Emanuel in Pueblo, Colorado, took over as editor of the Outlook. In 1908, Ben F. Rosenburg became owner. In 1911, Morris Friedman became editor and A. Rachofsky took over the business side. By 1913, in a difficult financial position, the Jewish Outlook suspended publication and gave its subscription list to The American Israelite in Cincinnati, Ohio. At the time, the Denver Jewish News was founded.
