= Charles David Spivak =

American Jewish physician (1861–1927)

Charles David Spivak (December 25, 1861 – October 16, 1927) was a Russian-born American medical doctor, community leader, and writer. He was one of the founders of the Jewish Consumptives' Relief Society in what is now Lakewood, Colorado. He was the editor of The Sanatorium as well as the first editor of the Denver Jewish News (now known as the Intermountain Jewish News). Together with Yehoash, he is also the author of what was once the premier Yiddish-English Dictionary.

== Early life ==
Spivak was born Chaim Davod Spivakofsky on December 25, 1861, in the village of Kremenchuk in Russia (now Ukraine). In 1882, he and his friend Victor Yarros emigrated to the United States as political refugees. After working in New York City and Lisbon Falls, Maine, Spivak moved to Philadelphia, Pennsylvania, in 1886. He studied medicine at Jefferson Medical School from 1887 to 1890 and later married a fellow Russian-Jewish immigrant, Jennie Charsky, in 1893.

== Jewish Consumptive Relief Society ==
In 1904, the Spivak family moved to Denver for Jennie Charsky Spivak's incipient tuberculosis. Spivak practiced medicine in Denver and, in 1904, he became one of the founders of the Jewish Consumptives' Relief Society (JCRS) tuberculosis sanatorium. He was the Director and Secretary of the JCRS hospital from 1904 until his death in 1927. He was also the editor of The Sanatorium, a journal from the JCRS Press and Propaganda Committee that included reports from the JCRS, medical advice, human interest stories, poetry, and literature. The campus of the JCRS hospital which Spivak used to be director, became the American Medical Center in 1954 and is now the home of the Rocky Mountain College of Art + Design.

== World War I Relief Work ==
In 1920, Spivak took a leave of absence from the JCRS to serve as a special U.S. medical commissioner in war-torn Europe. He was a representative of the Joint Distribution Committee and organized relief for Jewish refugees in Poland and Ukraine.

== Personal life ==
Spivak was married to Jennie Charsky and the father of artist H. David Spivak (1893–1934), Deena Spivak, and Ruth Spivak. His wife, Jennie was also briefly the brother-in-law of Jacob Marinoff. Spivak is also the great-grandfather of MacArthur Fellows Program awardee, Marla Spivak. and the great-great-grandfather of David Spivak.

Spivak died on October 16, 1927. His will stated that his skeleton should be donated to science and the rest of his remains should be buried with patients: “That my body be embalmed and shipped to the nearest medical college for an equal number of non-Jewish and Jewish students to carefully dissect. After my body has been dissected, the bones should be articulated by an expert and the skeleton shipped to the University of Jerusalem, with the request that the same be used for demonstration purposes in the department of anatomy.” His skeleton is at the Hadassah Medical Center in Israel and other remains are buried at Golden Hill Cemetery in Golden, Colorado.

== Family, Friends, and Associates ==
Family

- May Arno Schwatt
- Jacob Marinoff
- Marla Spivak
- David Spivak

Friends

- Rabbi Charles Kauvar of the Beth HaMedrosh Hagodol-Beth Joseph
- Rabbi William S. Friedman of the Temple Emanuel (Denver)
- Yehoash (poet)

Associates

- John F. Shafroth

== Academic Research on Dr. Charles D. Spivak ==
- In 2009, Jeanne Abrams, Ph.D., published Dr. Charles David Spivak: A Jewish Immigrant and the American Tuberculosis Movement (2009)
- In 2020, Thomas E. Keefe, Ed.D., published This Day in RMCAD and the Historic JCRS | AMC Campus: A Diary of Care, Research, and Creativity (2020)
- In 2022, Gracie Daniels published "A Blast the Past Past: RMCAD’s Campus History"

== Legacy ==
- The University of Denver has a permanent online exhibit "Chasing the Cure" in which Dr. Spivak and the Jewish Consumptives' Relief Society feature prominently.
- In 2019, Dr. Spivak and the Jewish Consumptives' Relief Society were featured in the "Lakewood: A 20th Century Journey" exhibition as part of Lakewood's 50th Anniversary celebration
- In 2022, The Rocky Mountain College of Art + Design hosted the descendants of Charles D. Spivak and H. David Spivak. Professor Thomas E. Keefe presented a lecture on the Spivak Family and H. David Spivak in particular.
