= Intermountain Jewish News =

Weekly newspaper published in Denver, Colorado

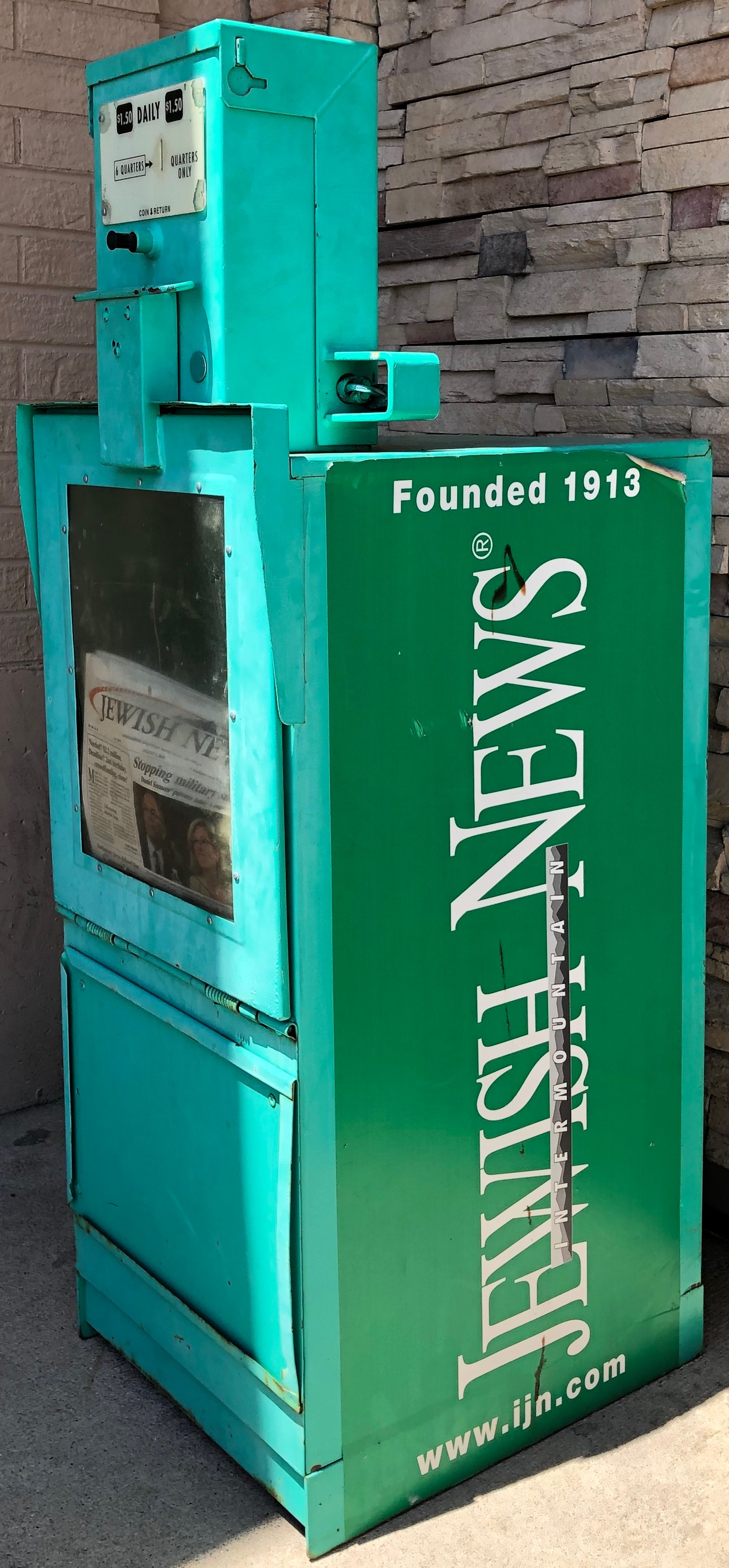
- Type: Weekly newspaper
- Publisher: Rabbi Hillel Goldberg
- Founded: 1913
- Headquarters: Denver, Colorado
- Country: United States
- Circulation: 30,000
- ISSN: 0047-0511
- Website: ijn.com

The Intermountain Jewish News (IJN) is a weekly newspaper serving the Denver-Boulder communities and the greater Rocky Mountain Jewish community (Colorado, New Mexico, Wyoming, Utah, and Montana).

The newspaper was founded in 1913 and had a series of editors before being taken over by Robert Gamzey and Max Goldberg in 1943. Since then the newspaper has been owned and operated by the Goldberg family.

As of 2021 Rabbi Hillel Goldberg is the editor and publisher.

== The Denver Jewish News (1913-1925) ==
The Denver Jewish News was founded in 1913 after the Jewish Outlook folded. Its first issue appeared on February 26, 1915. A February 27, 1915 article in the Rocky Mountain News said that the Denver Jewish News would become a "permanent feature of Denver's newspaper field."

The newspaper was the official organ of the Central Jewish Council of Denver, which had been founded in 1912 by community leaders including Rabbi Charles E. H. Kauvar of Beth HaMedrosh Hagodol or BMH (now known as Beth HaMedrosh Hagodol-Beth Joseph, attorney and philanthropist Milton Anfenger, and Dr. Charles David Spivak of the Jewish Consumptives' Relief Society.

Spivak, who served as the Denver Jewish News’ first editor, was a political refugee from Russia who attended medical school in Philadelphia and helped found the Jewish Consumptives' Relief Society (JCRS) in what is now Lakewood, Colorado.

According to an essay on the Library of Congress’ “Chronicling America” collection, the Denver Jewish News covered Denver's East Side, consisting mostly of Reform Jews, and the West Side, consisting mostly of Eastern European (predominantly Polish and Russian) Orthodox immigrants. The newspaper covered national and regional news, including society happenings. Following World War I, the Denver Jewish News reported on relief efforts for Jews in Europe, as well as reported on an increase of anti-Semitic activity in Europe.

The earliest editions of the Denver Jewish News, along with the existing editions of the defunct Jewish Outlook, were selected in 2017 as part of a History Colorado grant to be added to the digital Chronicling America collection hosted by the Library of Congress.

== The Intermountain Jewish News ==
In 1925, the Denver Jewish News’ then editor and Denver University economics professor Abraham D. H. Kaplan renamed the publication the Intermountain Jewish News to reflect its wider range.

Notable editors and publishers included: Hattie Schayer Friedenthal (editor, 1917–1922), State Senator A.B. Hirschfeld (publisher, 1929–1943) and Carl Mandell (editor, 1933–1943).

In 1943, in the face of ongoing financial strains, the Central Jewish Council approached Max Goldberg, a Denver journalist and ad man, to take over the paper. Goldberg, together with Robert Gamzey, took ownership of the newspaper. Max Goldberg served as publisher from 1943 to 1972. Upon his death in 1972, Miriam Harris Goldberg took over as editor and publisher and stayed in the role until her death in 2017.

In addition to weekly publication, IJN publishes special editions approximately once a month, including three magazines: L'Chaim magazine (fall and spring) and Generations magazine (summer). Once every five years the IJN publishes a souvenir anniversary magazine. The 95th-anniversary magazine was published on July 7, 2008. The 100th-anniversary magazine was published on June 24, 2013. The 105th-anniversary magazine was published on June 25, 2018.

Syndicated columnists appearing in the IJN include Jonathan Tobin, Rabbi Jonathan Sacks and Mehmet Oz.

IJN is a member of the American Jewish Press Association (AJPA) and the Colorado Press Association.
