= Jewish Consumptives' Relief Society =

Jewish Consumptives' Relief Society (JCRS)

Geography
- Location: 1600 Pierce St., Lakewood, Colorado, U.S.
- Coordinates: 39°44′37″N 105°04′12″W

Organisation
- Care system: Private, defunct
- Type: Specialist
- Affiliated university: University of Colorado, St Anthony Hospital

Services
- Emergency department: N/A
- Beds: 400 at its peak
- Speciality: tuberculosis, later cancer research and treatment

History
- Founded: 1904

Links
- Lists: Hospitals in U.S.
- Jewish Consuptives' Relief Society
- U.S. National Register of Historic Places
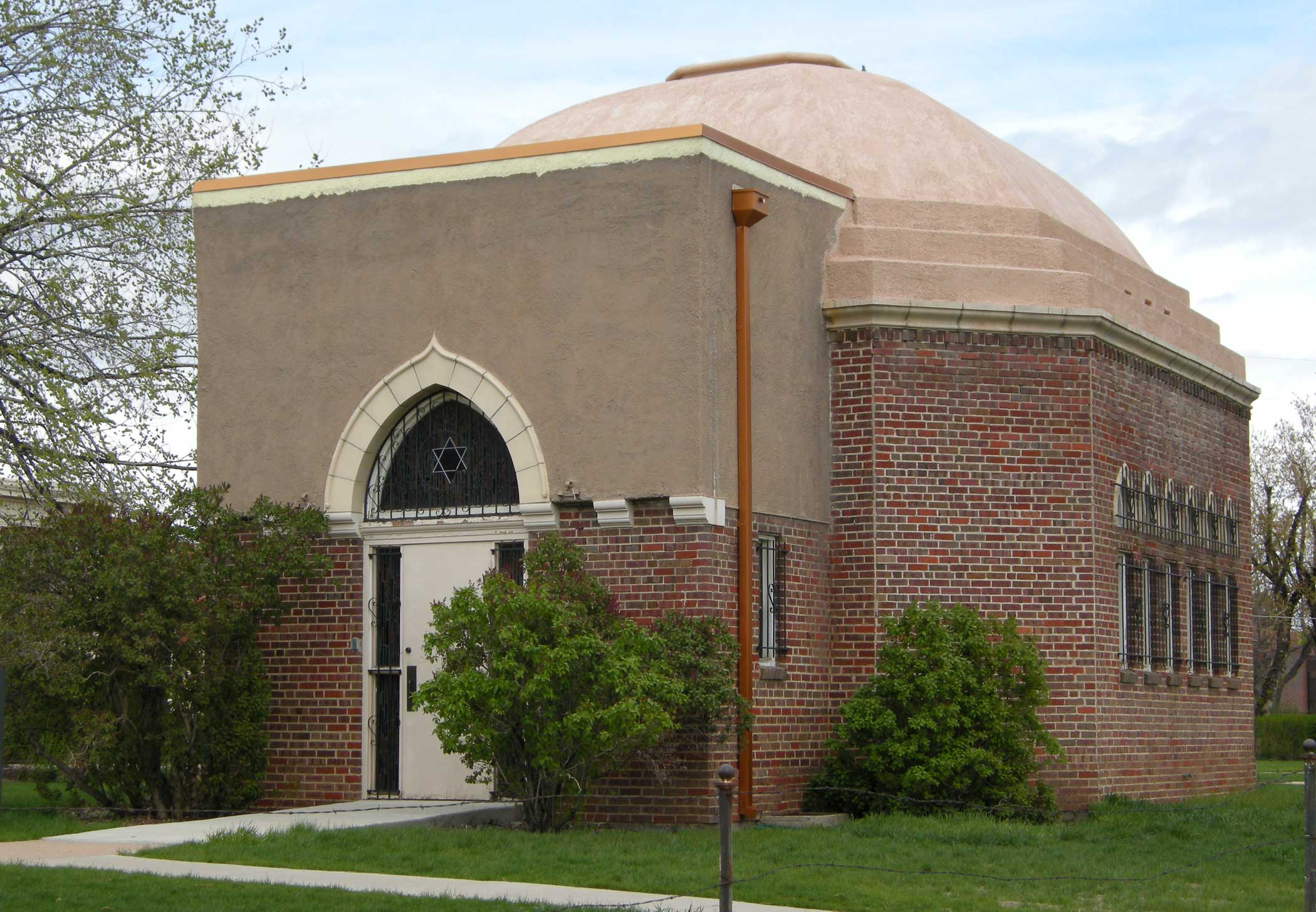
- Isaac Solomon Synagogue

- Location within Colorado Location within the United States
- Location: 6401 W. Colfax Ave., Lakewood, Colorado
- Area: 15 acres (6.1 ha)
- Built: 1904
- Architectural style: Classical Revival
- NRHP reference No.: 80000905
- Added to NRHP: June 26, 1980

The Jewish Consumptives' Relief Society (JCRS) was a non-sectarian sanatorium to treat tuberculosis patients in Lakewood, Colorado. Founded in 1904, the sanatorium campus was also home to the first synagogue in Jefferson County, Colorado. In 1954 the institution changed its mission to cancer research and became The American Medical Center at Denver. The American Medical Center merged with the University of Colorado Anschutz Medical Campus in 2002.

Today, most of the original JCRS campus buildings are occupied by Rocky Mountain College of Art and Design, which purchased the property in 2002. Approximately 20 acres (8.1 ha) of the original JCRS campus was converted into a shopping center in the 1950s, known first as the JCRS Shopping Center and renamed to Lamar Station Plaza in 2014.

== History ==
By the late 19th century, Colorado and the American Southwest had become famous for the health benefits of a dry, sunny climate. At that time, the only known treatment for tuberculosis was clean air and sunshine and hundreds of people with tuberculosis descended upon Denver in hopes of finding a cure for what was then the nation's leading cause of death. Consequently, many people with tuberculosis spent their last dollars coming to Colorado. By the 1890s, it was estimated that one out of every three residents of the state was there for respiratory reasons. However, no facilities existed to provide treatment or shelter to these victims. In Denver, victims of tuberculosis were literally dying in the streets as boarding houses often banned "lungers", as they were called.

=== Jewish Consumptives' Relief Society ===
When the Jewish Consumptives' Relief Society (JCRS) opened its doors in September 1904, it had only seven patients housed in white wooden "Tucker" tents. Over the next fifty years, the JCRS served over 10,000 patients; more than half of those patients were from New York City. While National Jewish Health was founded earlier to also treat tuberculosis, and both were nondenominational, JCRS was established to serve the Denver West Side Jewish community with an Orthodox kitchen.

The campus was also home to the first synagogue in Jefferson County, Colorado. Completed in 1926, the Isaac Solomon Synagogue was the third synagogue on the JCRS campus and was actively used from 1926 until the 1950s. Since 1980, the campus has been on the National Register of Historic Places, though the original application does have several factual errors, such as confusing the 1926 synagogue with its 1911 predecessor.

Among the founders of JCRS was Dr. Charles David Spivak, who led the organization from 1904, until his death in 1927. Spivak was a political refugee from Russia (modern-day Ukraine) who attended medical school in Philadelphia before moving to Denver, Colorado. He was the first editor of the Denver Jewish News and the father of artist H. David Spivak.

In its history as a sanatorium, the JCRS hospital also became known as a center of Yiddish poetry and many of the patients were or became well-known literary figures, including Yehoash, Lune Mattes, H. Leivick, and Shea Tenenbaum.

=== The American Medical Center at Denver ===
In 1954, JCRS repurposed itself as the American Medical Center at Denver dedicated to cancer research and treatment. Over the next few years, approximately 20 acres (8.1 ha) of the original 148 acres (60 ha) JCRS campus along West Colfax Avenue between Kendall and Pierce Streets were developed into the JCRS Shopping Center, which opened in 1957 with anchor stores including J.C. Penney, Joslins, and Woolworth. Originally rented as revenue for the hospital, AMC later sold the shopping center. Casa Bonita opened in the former Joslins location in 1974. At about the same time, AMC also began renting the New York Building to Jefferson County and later sold the building to the county.

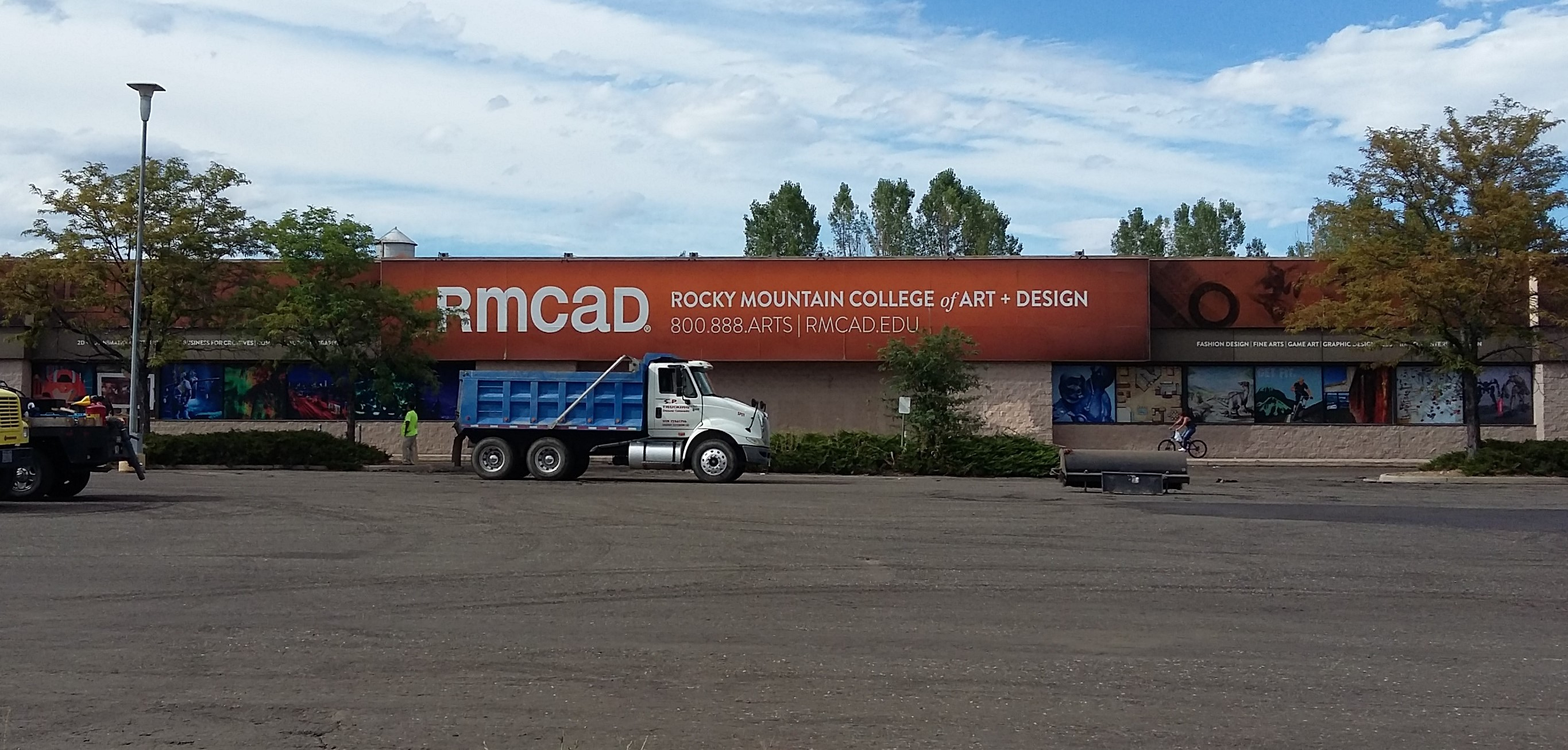

Following AMC's merge into the University of Colorado Anschutz Medical Campus, Rocky Mountain College of Art and Design purchased the JCRS campus's buildings, including 24 acres (9.7 ha) surrounding the buildings. The JCRS Shopping Center was renamed to Lamar Station Plaza in 2014.

== People ==
Hospital staff and supporters

- Philip Hillkowitz
- Rabbi Charles Kauvar of the Beth HaMedrosh Hagodol-Beth Joseph
- Rabbi William S. Friedman of the Temple Emanuel (Denver)
- Jacob Marinoff
- May Arno Schwatt
- Charles David Spivak

Patients (In chronological order)

- Yehuda Leib Ginsburg
- Sheyna Korngold (sister of former Israeli Prime Minister Golda Meir)
- Max Lazarus
- H. Leivick
- Lune Mattes
- Shea Tenenbaum
- Yehoash (poet)

== Exhibitions and events ==
- The University of Denver has a permanent online exhibit "Chasing the Cure" in which the Jewish Consumptives' Relief Society features prominently.
- In 2019, the Jewish Consumptives' Relief Society was featured in the "Lakewood: A 20th Century Journey" exhibition as part of Lakewood's 50th Anniversary celebration
- In 2022, The Rocky Mountain College of Art + Design hosted the descendants of Dr. Charles D. Spivak. Professor Thomas E. Keefe presented a lecture on the Jewish Consumptives' Relief Society, the Spivak family, and H. David Spivak in particular.
