= Miriam Goldberg =

American newspaper publisher

- Born: Miriam Harris; May 18, 1916; Chicago, Illinois, U.S.
- Died: January 8, 2017 (aged 100); Denver, Colorado, U.S.
- Burial place: Rose Hill Cemetery, Denver, Colorado, U.S.
- Education: Lindenwood College; University of Colorado Denver
- Occupations: Publisher and editor
- Years active: 1972—2016
- Employer: Intermountain Jewish News
- Predecessor: Max Goldberg
- Spouse: Max Goldberg
- Children: Hillel; Dorothy Leigh; Charles; Richard
- Parent(s): Harry Harris; Minnie Shibko

Miriam Goldberg (née Harris; May 18, 1916 – January 8, 2017) was an American newspaper publisher. From 1972 to 2017 she was the editor and publisher of the Intermountain Jewish News in Denver, Colorado.

She was inducted into the Colorado Women's Hall of Fame in 1987.

== Early life and education ==
She was born Miriam Harris in a Chicago hospital and grew up in Denver in a Jewish family. Her parents were Harry Harris (1874-1945) and Minnie Shibko.

She completed her K-12 education at the Teller Elementary School, Aaron Gove Junior High, and East High School, and attended Lindenwood College in St. Charles, Missouri. She also attended the University of Colorado Denver.

== Editor and publisher ==
On February 12, 1936, she married Max Goldberg, a columnist for The Denver Post.

Max founded and ran an advertising agency which handled publicity for gubernatorial, congressional, and senatorial candidates. In 1943 he bought the Intermountain Jewish News, which had been established in 1913 and had passed through a succession of owners, for the purchase price of one dollar. He brought in a partner to bolster the financially unstable paper, and successfully revamped it both financially and editorially.

After Max's death in 1972, Miriam took over as editor and publisher.

In 1983, one of her sons, Rabbi Hillel Goldberg, was named executive editor. Grandchildren have held staff positions, including Shana R. Goldberg (assistant publisher) and Tehilla R. Goldberg (columnist).

The Intermountain Jewish News reports on local events in Colorado, New Mexico, Wyoming, Utah, and Montana, national news in the United States, and news from Israel and other Jewish communities. Under Goldberg's steerage, the paper branched beyond community news into regional news and has taken "controversial stands". Goldberg instituted an editorial policy of presenting all sides of an issue to readers.

== Other activities ==
Goldberg was a past vice president of Hadassah and a former executive board member of the Colorado Press Association. She was also a Braille transcriber.

== Awards and honors ==
Goldberg received the Colorado Press Association Award of Excellence in 1979. Colorado Governor Richard Lamm declared September 9, 1982, as "Miriam Goldberg Recognition Day". In 1987 Goldberg was named Woman of the year by the Colorado Press Women and was inducted into the Colorado Women's Hall of Fame.

== Death ==
Goldberg died on January 8, 2017, at the age of 100.
