= Ouray County Plaindealer =

Ouray County, Colorado, USA weekly newspaper

The Ouray County Plaindealer
- Type: Weekly newspaper
- Format: Tabloid
- Owner(s): Mike Wiggins & Erin McIntyre
- Founded: 1877
- Headquarters: 195 S. Lena St. Unit D Ridgway, Colorado 81427; United States
- Circulation: 4,500 readers weekly
- Price: US$1.00
- Website: ouraynews.com

The Ouray County Plaindealer is a weekly newspaper based in Ouray County, Colorado, United States, and owned by Mike Wiggins and Erin McIntyre. It is the newspaper of record for the City of Ouray, Town of Ridgway, and Ouray County. It publishes every Thursday.

== History ==
The Plaindealer was founded as the Ouray Times, publishing its first edition June 23, 1877. It published weekly until 1886, when it was renamed the Ouray Budget and ran alternately as a weekly and a daily. In 1888, a new owner changed the name to the Ouray Plaindealer. The Plaindealer consolidated in 1892 with the San Juan Silverite, becoming known as the Silverite Plaindealer, which published daily until 1898. It then published weekly until 1901, when it dropped the Silverite part of its name. In 1922, the Plaindealer again consolidated, with the Ouray Herald, to become the Ouray Herald and Plaindealer. That name stuck until 1939, when it became simply the Ouray County Herald.

The Herald then fell dormant until 1969, when it was revived by Joyce Jorgensen and renamed the Ouray County Plaindealer, which has remained its name. Jorgensen, also an artist, was the editor and publisher. David Mullings bought the newspaper in 1995. Mullings' Ouray County Newspapers also owned the Ridgway Sun and the Silverton Standard in Silverton.

In 2010, the Sun and the Plaindealer were sold to Alan Todd and Beecher Threatt, publishing as 550 Publishing. In 2011, the Sun was merged into the Plaindealer and the Ouray County Plaindealer is now the official newspaper of the Town of Ridgway, the City of Ouray and Ouray County. In 2019, the Plaindealer was sold to Mike Wiggins and Erin McIntyre.

In January 2024, the Plaindealer published a story alleging a violent sexual assault against a teenaged girl at the home of the Ouray police chief. Press reports indicate that "nearly every copy" of the issue was stolen from 12 of the 13 news racks in the county. The paper received some $2,000 in donations, and printed and distributed another run. The stolen papers were later returned in a garbage bag.

== Awards ==
The Plaindealer is a frequent winner of Colorado Press Association awards in its class, and in 2007, publisher David Mullings received the state's "Service to the First" (Amendment) award for initiating legal action against the Ouray County Board of County Commissioners that resulted in an open process of selecting planning commissioners.

In 2021, co-publishers Mike Wiggins and Erin McIntyre jointly received the "Keeper of the Flame" award of the Colorado chapter of the Society of Professional Journalists. and the "rising star" award of the Colorado Press Association.
