= Ridgway Sun =

The Ridgway Sun
- Type: Weekly newspaper
- Format: Tabloid
- Owner(s): Ouray County Newspapers
- Publisher: David Mullings
- Editor: Patrick Davarn
- Founded: 1909
- Ceased publication: 2011
- Headquarters: 146 N. Cora, Suite 1B, PO Box 529; Ridgway, Colorado 81432; United States
- Circulation: 1,280 Weekly
- Price: US$0.50
- Website: ouraynews.com

The Ridgway Sun was a weekly newspaper based in Ridgway, Colorado, and owned by Ouray County Newspapers. Known as the "Newspaper that refused to die," it was the newspaper of record for Ridgway.

== History ==
The Ridgway Sun was founded by Grant Turner, publishing its first edition in 1909. In a time when newspapers espoused political affiliations, the publication was officially Republican. However, it was Turner's policy not to denounce the Democrats, and proclaimed a sincere respect for both parties. Turner published for nine years before selling to John J. McCarthy and E.W. Roscoe, who published for another eight years. Grover C. Huffnagle, editor under McCarthy and Roscoe, then took over and published until 1928.

The Sun then languished until its rebirth on April 3, 1980, under the leadership of Joyce Jorgensen, publisher and editor of the Ouray County Plaindealer and the Ouray Herald. In 1990, both the Ridgway Sun and Ouray County Plaindealer were purchased by Guy and Marcia Wood. In 1995 both newspapers were purchased by current publisher David Mullings and Ouray County Newspapers. In Oct. 2010, Ouray County Newspapers sold the Sun and the Plaindealer to Alan Todd and Beecher Threatt, publishing as 550 Publishing. In 2011, the Sun was merged into the Plaindealer

== Editorial policy ==
In a statement published in the Ridgway Sun's print editions, the paper's goals were described:

...To accurately and comprehensively report news of importance to the people of Ridgway and the area.

...To be a strong, independent voice on local public issues, and to provide a forum for open discussion of those issues.

...To provide a marketplace for local businesses and individuals, so as to encourage a healthy local economy.

...To be a responsible and profitable business.

== Awards ==
The Ridgway Sun is a frequent winner of Colorado Press Association awards in its class, and in 2007 Publisher David Mullings received the state’s "Service to the First" (Amendment) award. He was recognized for initiating action against the Ouray County Board of County Commissioners that resulted in an open process of selecting planning commissioners, and for enduring sharp and anonymous attacks on the newspaper and on his credibility for the challenge.
