= Lisbon Falls, Maine =

- Census-designated place
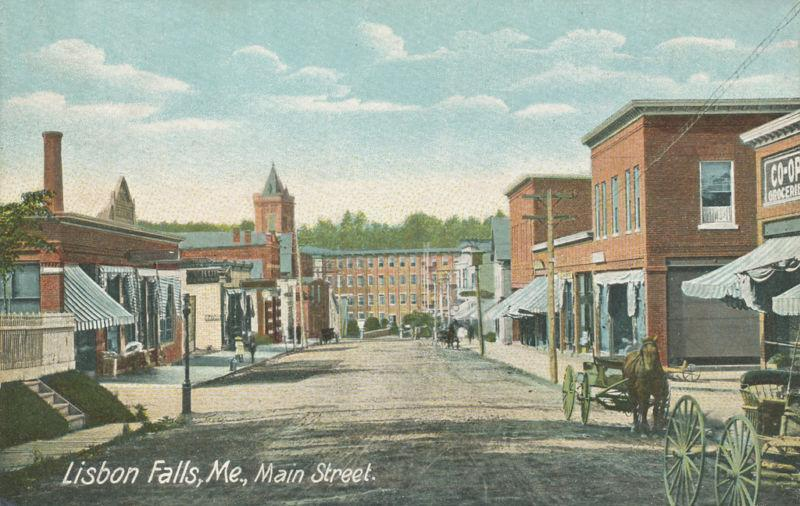
- Main Street in 1905

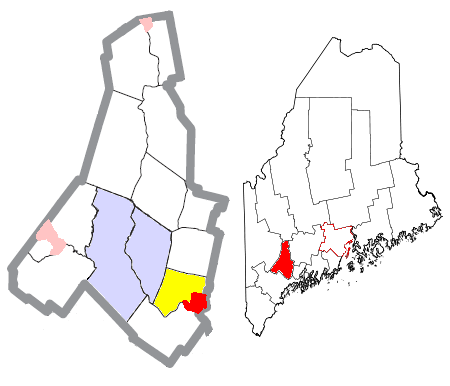
- Location of Lisbon Falls (in red) in Androscoggin County and the state of Maine
- Coordinates: 44°00′15″N 70°3′31″W
- Country: United States
- State: Maine
- County: Androscoggin
- Town: Lisbon

Area
  - Total: 3.87 sq mi (10.02 km^{2})
  - Land: 3.68 sq mi (9.53 km^{2})
  - Water: 0.19 sq mi (0.49 km^{2})
- Elevation: 157 ft (48 m)

Population (2020)
  - Total: 4,182
  - Density: 1,136.7/sq mi (438.87/km^{2})
- Time zone: UTC-5 (Eastern (EST))
  - Summer (DST): UTC-4 (EDT)
- ZIP code: 04252
- Area code: 207
- FIPS code: 23-40105
- GNIS feature ID: 2377927

Lisbon Falls is a census-designated place (CDP) in the town of Lisbon, located in Androscoggin County, Maine, United States. As of the 2020 census, Lisbon Falls had a population of 4,182. It is included in both the Lewiston-Auburn, Maine Metropolitan Statistical Area and the Lewiston-Auburn, Maine, Metropolitan New England City and Town Area.

== History ==
Abenaki Indians called the falls Anmecangin, meaning "much fish". The area was once part of Little River Plantation, a portion of which was incorporated in 1799 as Thompsonborough, then renamed in 1802 after Lisbon, Portugal. In 1806, Lisbon annexed the remainder of Little River Plantation. With water power from the Androscoggin River, Lisbon Falls became a small mill town. Before it burned down in 1987, the Worumbo Mill was the main mill in Lisbon Falls. It had been incorporated in 1864, and was world-famous for its woolens. Especially well known were its vicuña wool products, which became famous when President Eisenhower's Chief of Staff, Sherman Adams, received a vicuna sport coat as a gift from a wealthy industrialist and had to resign due to the resulting scandal. The town's primary employment was at a gypsum mill, which closed in 2009. Another large employer is Bath Iron Works, in nearby Bath, Maine.

The town is famous for its Moxie Days, a celebration of the soft drink Moxie. For many years, the festivities were centered on Kennebec Fruit Company, an old-time corner store that was owned by Frank Anicetti, a longtime champion of the beverage who died in May 2017. In July 2017, the renovated location was reopened under new ownership as Frank's Restaurant & Pub. Moxie Days in Lisbon Falls is attended by thousands from around the world each summer.

== Geography ==
According to the United States Census Bureau, the CDP has a total area of 3.9 square miles (10.0 km^{2}), of which 3.7 square miles (9.5 km^{2}) is land and 0.19 square miles (0.5 km^{2}), or 4.87%, is water. Lisbon Falls is drained by the Androscoggin River and the Little River.

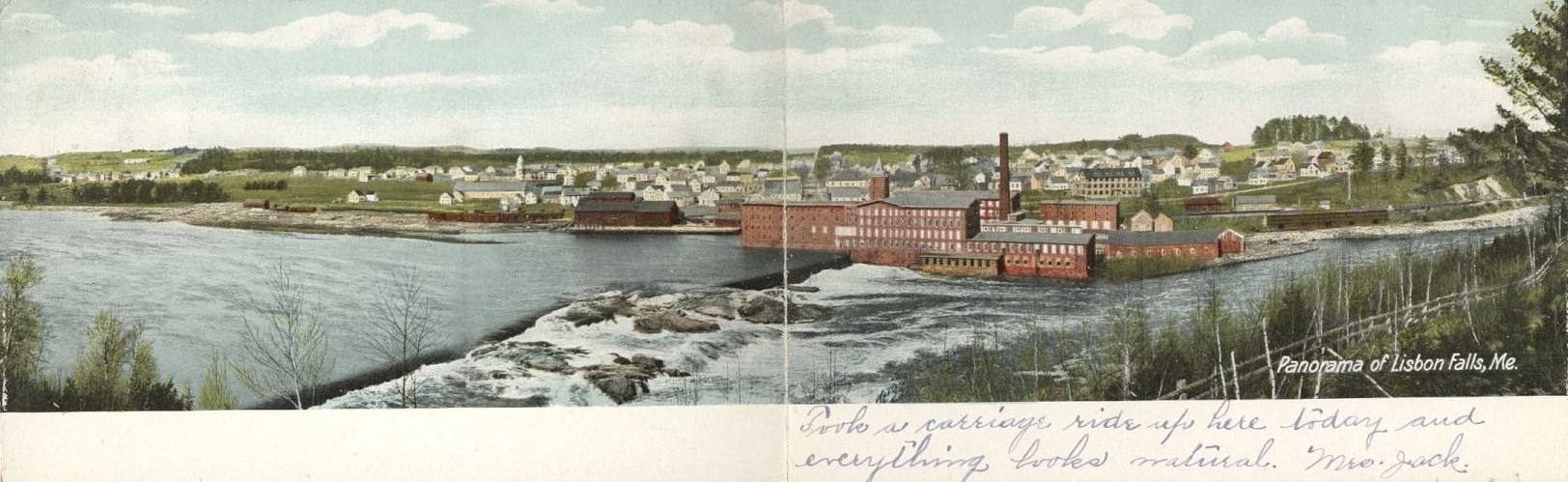
1906 postcard view of the town

=== Climate ===
This climatic region is typified by large seasonal temperature differences, with warm to hot (and often humid) summers and cold (sometimes severely cold) winters. According to the Köppen Climate Classification system, Lisbon Falls has a humid continental climate, abbreviated "Dfb" on climate maps.

== Demographics ==
Historical population
| Census | Pop. | Note | %± |
|---|---|---|---|
| 2020 | 4,182 | | — |
U.S. Decennial Census

=== 2020 census ===
As of the 2020 census, Lisbon Falls had a population of 4,182. The median age was 38.8 years. 22.1% of residents were under the age of 18 and 16.9% of residents were 65 years of age or older. For every 100 females there were 96.4 males, and for every 100 females age 18 and over there were 91.5 males age 18 and over.

89.0% of residents lived in urban areas, while 11.0% lived in rural areas.

There were 1,771 households in Lisbon Falls, of which 29.9% had children under the age of 18 living in them. Of all households, 45.0% were married-couple households, 19.0% were households with a male householder and no spouse or partner present, and 26.1% were households with a female householder and no spouse or partner present. About 28.6% of all households were made up of individuals and 11.0% had someone living alone who was 65 years of age or older.

There were 1,879 housing units, of which 5.7% were vacant. The homeowner vacancy rate was 1.2% and the rental vacancy rate was 5.9%.

Racial composition as of the 2020 census
| Race | Number | Percent |
|---|---|---|
| White | 3,834 | 91.7% |
| Black or African American | 33 | 0.8% |
| American Indian and Alaska Native | 18 | 0.4% |
| Asian | 28 | 0.7% |
| Native Hawaiian and Other Pacific Islander | 4 | 0.1% |
| Some other race | 33 | 0.8% |
| Two or more races | 232 | 5.5% |
| Hispanic or Latino (of any race) | 74 | 1.8% |

=== 2000 census ===
As of the 2000 census, there were 4,420 people, 1,707 households, and 1,206 families residing in the CDP. The population density was 1,162.4 inhabitants per square mile (448.8/km^{2}). There were 1,798 housing units at an average density of 472.8 per square mile (182.5/km^{2}). The racial makeup of the CDP was 96.99% White, 0.63% African American, 0.23% Native American, 0.41% Asian, 0.07% Pacific Islander, 0.45% from other races, and 1.22% from two or more races. Hispanic or Latino of any race were 1.06% of the population.

There were 1,707 households, out of which 36.7% had children under the age of 18 living with them, 54.1% were married couples living together, 12.7% had a female householder with no husband present, and 29.3% were non-families. 22.6% of all households were made up of individuals, and 7.3% had someone living alone who was 65 years of age or older. The average household size was 2.59 and the average family size was 3.02.

In the CDP, the population was spread out, with 27.4% under the age of 18, 8.7% from 18 to 24, 32.6% from 25 to 44, 20.9% from 45 to 64, and 10.3% who were 65 years of age or older. The median age was 35 years. For every 100 females, there were 96.8 males. For every 100 females age 18 and over, there were 94.3 males.

The median income for a household in the CDP was $39,224, and the median income for a family was $42,476. Males had a median income of $31,735 versus $20,688 for females. The per capita income for the CDP was $16,838. About 8.5% of families and 10.2% of the population were below the poverty line, including 14.6% of those under age 18 and 4.6% of those age 65 or over.

== Notable people ==
- John Gould, famous Maine humorist and author.
- Stephen King, horror fiction writer, attended Lisbon Falls High School.
- Charles David Spivak, one of the founders of the Jewish Consumptives' Relief Society

== Site of interest ==
- Lisbon Historical Society Museum
