= William S. Friedman =

American Rabbi (1868–1944)

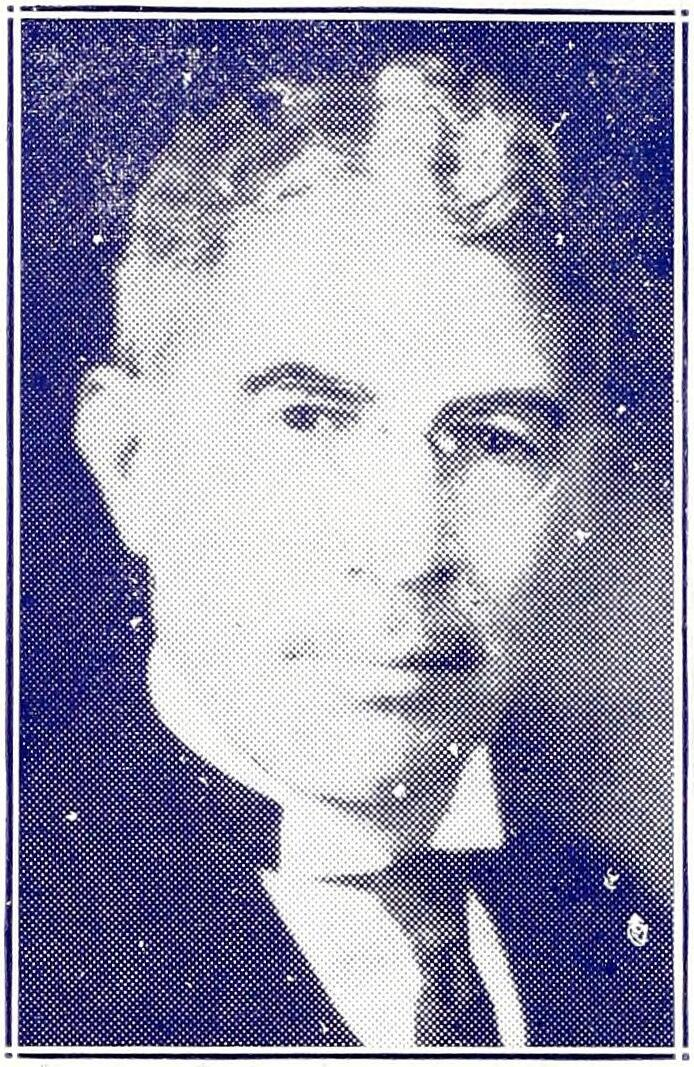
Friedman c. 1938

William Sterne Friedman (October 24, 1868 – April 26, 1944) was a Jewish-American rabbi who ministered in Denver, Colorado for fifty years.

== Life ==
Friedman was born on October 24, 1868, in Chicago, Illinois, the son of Nathan Friedman and Bertha Sternberg. His father was a German immigrant who came to America in 1850 and worked as a merchant.

Friedman attended the University of Cincinnati and Hebrew Union College and graduated from both of them in 1889. He was then appointed rabbi of Temple Emanuel in Denver, Colorado. A year later, he founded the National Jewish Hospital, the first free nonsectarian tubercular sanatorium in America. He served as the Hospital's vice-president from 1911 to 1929, the president from 1929 onward, and chairman of the board of managers since its founding. The Hospital named the William Sterne Friedman Building in his honor. Under his leadership, Temple Emanuel grew from only a handful of pioneers to over 500 families and around 2,000 individuals. He retired as rabbi emeritus in 1939.

Shortly after arriving in Denver, Friedman was named vice-president of the Charity Organization Society of Denver. In 1902, he became the University of Colorado's Hebrew professor, and in 1906 the University gave him an LL.D. degree. He was named to the State Board of Charities in Corrections in 1901 and he served as its president from 1905 to 1909. He became a member of the Denver Public Library Commission in 1906 and was named its vice-president in 1910. When Russian Jews were hit by a wave of pogroms in 1905, he helped organize and became president of the Central Committee of the Rocky Mountain Region for their relief.

In 1903, Friedman married Juliet Freyhan, daughter of Julius Freyhan. Their children were J. Freyhan and Pauline A.

Friedman died at his home in Coronado, California, on April 26, 1944. Struck by an illness in 1938, he moved to the West Coast after his retirement in 1939. Hundreds of people attended his funeral at Temple Emanuel, including various Denver clergy. Rabbi Herbert A. Friedman delivered the eulogy, Rabbi C. E. H. Kauvar of the B.M.H. Synagogue and Rabbi Manuel Laderman of the Hebrew Educational Alliance gave prayers at the service, and the honorary pallbearers included Mayor Benjamin F. Stapleton and Governor John C. Vivian. He was buried in Emanuel Cemetery.
