= John Gould (columnist) =

American humorist (1908–2003)

John Thomas Gould (October 22, 1908 – September 1, 2003) was an American humorist, essayist, and columnist who wrote a column for the Christian Science Monitor for over sixty years from a farm in Lisbon Falls, Maine. He was published in most major American newspapers and magazines and wrote thirty books.

== Early life ==
Gould was born in Brighton, Massachusetts to Franklin Farrar Gould and Hilda Dobson Jenkins. After his birth the family moved to nearby Medford. When Gould was ten years old his family, which then included three children, moved to Freeport, Maine. Gould was responsible for farm chores before and after school, but his father stressed the importance of his education. His family subscribed to The Youth's Companion, the Rural New Yorker and The Boston Post, all of which published materials submitted by young Gould.

== Education ==
In 1924, as a sophomore in high school, he offered to be a reporter for the Brunswick Record, and following an encouraging reply from the editor, began submitting news items and was thus gainfully employed with the Record until 1940. He was also writing as a stringer for other newspapers and as a result became a featured writer for the Boston Sunday Post.

Having graduated from Bowdoin College in 1931, on his 24th birthday (October 22, 1932) he married Dorothy Florence Wells of Arlington, Massachusetts. After their honeymoon they made their home in Brunswick, Maine, where Gould resumed writing for the Brunswick Record and his wife became the newspaper's household editor. In 1946, the couple purchased the Gould family farm in Lisbon Falls, where they would make their home for over thirty years.

== Career ==
Gould published his first book in 1940 and began writing a weekly column for the Christian Science Monitor in 1942. The Monitor syndicated his column and he was published in all major magazines and many newspapers in the United States. For five years he did a daily radio show for WLAM in Lewiston, Maine and a weekly show for WBZ in Boston. He was also a frequent contributor of taped features for the Trans-Canada English network of the Canadian Broadcasting Corporation.

In addition, he was the editor and publisher of the Lisbon Enterprise, a weekly newspaper, published in Lisbon Falls. Gould appeared as himself on the January 20, 1964 episode of To Tell the Truth. He fooled three of the contestants, who believed another contestant was actually Gould.

In 1973 and 1974, Gould collaborated with Friendship, Maine based storyteller Newt Hinckley on two record albums: Newt Hinckley Visits with John Gould at Friendship Back River and The Fastest Hound Dog in the State of Maine.

== Published books ==
- "New England Town Meeting" (Brattleboro, VT: Stephen Daye Press, 1940)
- "Pre-Natal Care for Fathers" (Brattleboro, VT: Stephen Daye Press, 1941)
- Farmer Takes a Wife (New York: William Morrow, 1945)
- The House that Jacob Built (New York: William Morrow, 1947)
- And One to Grow On (New York: William Morrow, 1949)
- Neither Hay nor Grass (New York: William Morrow, 1951)
- The Fastest Hound Dog in the State of Maine, with illustrations by F. Wenderoth Saunders (Thorndike: Thorndike Press, 1953, 1981, 1985, ISBN 0-89621-088-X)
- Monstrous Depravity: A jeremiad and a lamentation [about things to eat] (New York: William Morrow, 1963)
- The Parables of Peter Partout, with illustrations by F. Wenderoth Saunders (Boston, Little, Brown, 1964)
- You Should Start Sooner; in which widely separated topics are strangely discussed by an old cuss, with illustrations by F. Wenderoth Saunders (Boston: Little, Brown, 1964)
- Last One in: Tales of a New England boyhood, a gently pleasing dip into a cool soothing pool of the not-so-long-ago, so to speak, with illustrations by F. Wenderoth Saunders (Boston, Little, Brown, 1966)
- Europe on Saturday Night; The Farmer and His Wife Take a Trip (Boston: Little, Brown, 1968)
- The Jonesport Raffle, and Numerous Other Maine Veracities, with illustrations by Edward Malsberg (Boston: Little, Brown, 1969)
- Twelve Grindstones; or, A few more good ones, being another cultural roundup of Maine folklore, sort of, although not intended to be definitive, and perhaps not so cultural, either, with illustrations by Edward Malsberg (Boston: Little, Brown, 1970)
- The Shag Bag, which, considering our peculiar [sic] present, has no motive, purpose, and dedicated aim, and is meant only to be amusing — which not very much is nowadays, is it?, with illustrations by Edward Malsberg (Boston: Little, Brown, 1972)
- Glass Eyes by the Bottle: Some conversations about some conversation pieces (Boston: Little, Brown, 1975)
- Maine Lingo: Boiled owls, billdads & wazzats, in collaboration with Lillian Ross and the editors of Down East magazine (Camden, Maine: Down East Magazine, 1975)
- Next Time Around : Some things pleasantly remembered, with illustrations by Consuelo Eames Hanks (New York: W.W. Norton, 1983)
- No Other Place (New York: W.W. Norton, 1984)
- Stitch in Time, with illustrations by Consuelo Eames Hanks (New York: W.W. Norton, 1985, ISBN 0-393-01976-4)
- The Wines of Pentagoët (New York: W.W. Norton, 1986)
- Old Hundredth, with illustrations by F. Wenderoth Saunders (New York: W.W. Norton, 1987)
- There Goes Maine!: A somewhat history, sort of, of the Pine Tree State (New York: W.W. Norton, 1990, ISBN 0-393-02834-8)
- Funny about That, with drawings by Consuelo Eames Hanks (New York: W.W. Norton, 1992, ISBN 0-393-03049-0)
- It Is Not Now: Tales of Maine (New York: W.W. Norton, 1993, ISBN 0-393-03465-8)
- Dispatches from Maine: 1942-1992 (New York: W.W. Norton, 1994, ISBN 0-393-03624-3)
- Tales from Rhapsody Home, or, What They Don't Tell You About Senior Living (Chapel Hill, NC: Algonquin Books of Chapel Hill, 2000, ISBN 1-56512-280-1)
