= Yosef Tunkel =

American poet (1881–1949)

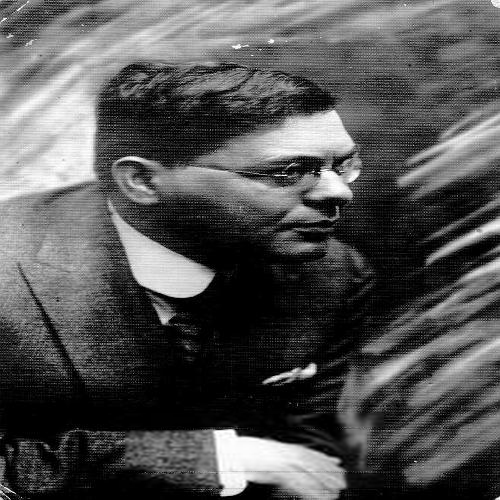
- Yosef Tunkel, Warsaw 1922
- Born: 1881; Babruysk, Russian Empire (present-day Belarus)
- Died: August 9, 1949 (aged 67–68); New York, U.S.

Yosef Tunkel (1881 – August 9, 1949) was a Jewish–Belarusian–American writer of poetry and humorous prose in Yiddish commonly known by the pen name Der Tunkeler or 'The dark one' in Yiddish.

== Biography ==
In 1878, Tunkel was born into the family of a poor melamed in Babruysk (in Belarus, then part of the Russian Empire). Tunkel was a sickly child whose drawing ability prompted charitable members of the community to send him to Ivan Trutnev's art school in Vilnius at age fifteen. He finished his studies in 1899 and, too short sighted to be a painter, turned to writing. His poetry was first published in Der yud in 1901 and from then on his poems, satires, drama and children's stories appeared in Yiddish publications throughout Europe and North America.

Between 1906 and 1910 he travelled to the United States and settled in New York where he started the humorous journal Der kibitser (continued for two decades under the title Der Groyser Kundes). He returned home to Babruysk in 1910 due to family emergency. Moving to Warsaw in 1911 he wrote for Der moment, editing its humour pages, Der krumer spiegel, or The Crooked Mirror. AT this time, he started using the pseudonyms "Khoyshekh" and "Der Tunkeler". He spent World War I first at home in Babruysk, then in Ukraine, mainly in Kiev and Odessa. In the early twenties, he adapted several works of German poet Wilhelm Busch. He returned to independent Poland, and Der Moment, after the war. He also occasionally wrote for other newspapers such as Der Haynt and the Folkszeitung (People's Paper) under the pseudonym "Androginus". Around this time, he visited Israel, where he was feted by the Hebrew Writers Union and Khaim Nakhman Bialik, who declared himself a great admirer of Tunkeler's works. Tunkler subsequently wrote his first travel narrative based on his experiences in the Holy Land.

In the 1920s, Tunkler published numerous books, plays, feuilletons, parodies and humorous articles. He often personally acted out his works on stage while traveling around the country. When the Warsaw cabaret Azazel opened in 1925, Der Tunkeler's writings were part of the repertoire; his works were staged in Łódź and the Warsaw cabaret theater Sambatyon (which opened in 1927) as well.

In 1931 he visited what was then the British Mandate of Palestine, then traveled to the United States in 1932/1933 to visit his brothers and old friends as well as to gather material for a travel narrative. He stayed in Springfield where his brother Alex and sister-in-law Rose lived. Around 1934, he traveled to the Soviet Union to gather material for a subsequently published travel narrative. He lived in Paris for some time. In 1938 he adapted the Polish film Neighbors into Yiddish. The outbreak of World War II found him in Belgium from which he escaped into France with a group of Jewish refugees, only to be arrested by the Vichy authorities. He was sent to a detention center for foreign Jews in Strasbourg, where he befriended the Parisian novelist W. Wowiorka.

Escaping in early 1941, he managed to find his way to the US once more, where he wrote for the major New York Yiddish daily The Jewish Daily Forward despite failing health. He settled permanently in New York. In 1943, he published the autobiographical work Goles: Ksovim von a Flichtling (Exile - The Writings of an Exile) about his experiences in Belgium and France in an attempt to shed light on the plight of European Jewry. In 1948, Tunkel published his last book Der Groyser Genits Oder a Nudner Tag in Nyu York (The Great Genius or an Annoying Day in New York). His last work of literature was an article for the Lithuanian Yizkor Book Lite "The Chapter of Vilna in my Life" which is published posthumously in 1951.

His physical health was worsened by his experiences in the French camps and he spent the last several years of his life ill and nearly blind. On August 9, 1949, Iosef Tunkel died and was interred in the New Mount Carmel cemetery in Ridgewood, Queens, New York.

Throughout his life, numerous collections of his work were published in Warsaw, Kiev and New York. He is recognized as one of the Yiddish language's outstanding humorists.

== Bibliography ==
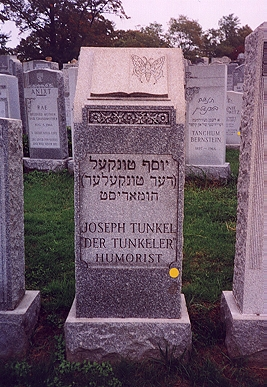
Headstone

- Yo Hasene Hoben, Nit Hasene Hoben, 19??
- Der Krumer Shpiegel: Parodien, Sharzhen, und Nokhhamungen, Warsaw, 1911. 58 pp. (NUC1) (NYPL)
- Fleder Mayz ... Filietonen, Lieder un Parodien, Verlag A Gittlin, Warsaw, 1912. 71 pp. (HUC) (NYPL,1)
- Der Griner Papugai: A Zamlung fun Monologen, Satiren, un Parodien, Published by Y. Halter, Warsaw, 1912. 72 pp. (NUC1)
- Der Goldener Aeroplan Oder Haim-Yankel Der Honig Kvetsher, Lewin-Epstein Publishers, Warsaw, 1914. 96 pp. Illus. (NYPL)
- Di Royte Hagode, N. Halperin, Odessa, 1917. 16 pp. (LYS)
- Di Bolshevistishe Hagode, fun Tunkelen Mit ... Masiyos un Meshalim. Mit Perushim un Dinim Wegen Bdikat Khametz un Biur Hametz un Seder-Preven ... M. Goldfein Publishers, Kiev, 1918. 16 pp. (HUC)
- Idishisten, Kiev?, 1918? 15 pp. (NYPL1)
- Malines - in Pensionet, Kiev?, 1918? 15 pp. (NYPL1)
- Zumer-Leb, Kiev, 1918. 15 pp. (LNYL)
- Der Purim-Ber, Odessa, Blimeloch, Odessa, 1919. 22 pp. (LYS)
- Der Humorist. A Shpas in ein Akt, Farlag Levin-Epstein Bros. and Partners, Warsaw, 1920. 28 pp. (NUC1)
- Masoes Benyomin HaRevii (Funem Ukrainishn Khaos), Farlag "Mizrah un Maarav", New York, 1920. 91 pp. (NUC1)
- Der Khazn, A Shpas in ein Akt, Farlag Levin-Epstein Bros. and Partners, Warsaw, 1920. 26 pp. (NYPL)
- Vikhne-Dvoshe Fort Keyn America, Farlag Humoristishe Bibliotek, Warsaw, 1921. 91 pp. (NUC1) (HUC)
- Kopel un di Genz, Warsaw, 1921 (2nd edition, 1928). 14 pp. Illus. (LNYL)
- Der Regenboygen, Warsaw, 1922. 267 pp. (LNYL)
- Haim Getzel Der Reformator Mit Zaynen 25 Reformen, Farlag "Humoristishes Bibliotek", Warsaw, 1922. 74 pp. Illus. (HUC) (NYPL)
- Katoves, Warsaw, 1923, 134 pp. (LNYL)
- Mit di Fis Aroyf: Naye Humoreskes, Stzenkes un Parodiyes, Achisepher Publishers, Warsaw, 1926?. 211 pp. (NUC1) (NYPL)
- Mitn Kop Arop: Parodiyes, Farlag "Tsentral", Warsaw, 1924 (2nd edition, Wilno, 1931). 189 p. (NUC1,2) (NYPL) (HUC)
- Oyf-tsu-kloymersht: Humoreskes fun Der Tunkeler, B. Klatzkin Publishers, Warsaw and Wilno, 1931. 216 pp. (NUC1,2) (NYPL) (HUC)
- Ikh Lakh fun Aykh: Humoresken, Stzenkes, Gramen, Bucher, Warsaw, 1931. 212 pp. (HUC) (NYPL)
- A Gelekhter on a Zayt. Satireskes, Humoreskes, Stzenkes, Achisefer, 1931. 95 pp. (LNYL says 193? pp) (HUC)
- Dos Freylikhe Teater: Eynakters, Stsenkes, Declamatsiyes, Bucher Publishers, Warsaw, 1931. 246 pp. (HUC) (NYPL)
- Fort a Yid Keyn Eretz Yisroel: "A Reise-Beschreibung", M. Nomberg Publishers, 1932. 278 pp. Illus. (HUC) (NYPL)
- In Gutn Mut: A Zamlung fun Humoreskes, Satires, Groteskes, Parodiyes, un Stsenkes, Kultur Buch, Warsaw, 1936. 222 pp. (NUC1) (NYPL)
- On Gal: Humoristishe Skitsen, Ferun un Gramen, Warsaw, 1939. 188 pp. (HUC)
- Goles: Ksovim fun a Flichtling, Schreiber Farlag, New York,1943. 95 pp. (NUC1,2) (NYPL) (HUC)
- Der Groyser Genits: Oder a Nudner Tog in Nyu York, A Humoristishe Dertseylung fun Tunkel, Schreiber Farlag, New York, 1948, 63 pp. (NUC1,2) (NYPL)

=== Collections ===
- Humoristishe Bibliotek, 5 Vol., (Vol. 1: Gelechter un a Zat, Vol. 2: Ich Lach fun Aych, Vol. 3: Miten Kop Aroyp, Vol. 4: Oyf-tsu-cloymersht, Vol. 5: Das Freiliki Teater), (Vol 3 and 4 printed at Wilna). (HUC)

=== Articles ===
- "Dos Kapital Vilna In Mein Leben" in Lite, Dr. Mendel Sudarsk and Uriah Katzenelenbogen eds., Volume 1, 1951, pp 1279–1289.
- "Zikhrones" in Bobruisk: Sefer-Zikharon Lekehilat Bobruisk u Venoteah, Yehuda Slutzky, ed. Volume 2, 1967, p 538–9.

=== Translations ===
- Busch, Wilhelm, 1832 - 1908. Notl un Motl, Farlag Levin-Epstein Bros. and Partners, Warsaw, 1928 (First edition, 1920). 74 pp. Illus. (NYPL) (LNYL)
- Busch, Wilhelm, 1832 - 1908. Di Papirene Shlang, Farlag Levin-Epstein Bros. and Partners, Warsaw, 1921. (2nd edition 1928) 22 pp. Illus. (NYPL) (LNYL)
- Busch, Wilhelm, 1832 - 1908. Kopel un di Genz, Farlag Levin-Epstein Bros. and Partners, Warsaw, 1921. 14 pp. Illus. (NYPL)
- Mann, Thomas, Jacob un Esau.

=== Newspapers and journals ===
- Der Kibitzer: Monatlikher Illustirter Zhurnal Far Humor, Vits un Kibets, Vol 1-8, New York (1908–1914). Illus. (HUC) (NYPL) (H) (YLLP)
- Der Groyser Kundes: A Zhurnal fir Humor, Vits un Satire, 12/15/1908 - 9/9/1927, New York. (H) (YLLP)
- Der Kromer Shpigel, Editor of the weekly humor supplement for the magazine Der Moment.

== Works about Tunkel ==
- "Der Tunkeler" in Ravitch, Melekh, Mayn Leksikon (My Dictionary), Vol. II, Northern Printing un Stashonery, Montreal, Canada, 1945., pp 101 – 3.
- "Tunkeler, Der" in Zylbercweig, Zalman, Leksikon fon Yidishe Teatr, (Dictionary of Yiddish Theater) Vol. II, Libris Publishers, Warsaw, 1934, pp 865 – 866.
- "Tunkel, Iosef 'Der Tunkeler"" in Raskin, Shaul, Leksikon fun der Nayer Yidisher Literatur (Dictionary of the New Yiddish Literature), Vol. I, Marstin Press, New York, 1961, pp 47 - 51.
- "Tunkel Iosef" in Encyclopaedia Judaica, p 1451.
- "Tunkel, Iosef 'Der Tunkeler'" in Landman, Isaac, ed. The Universal Jewish Encyclopedia, Vol 10, Ktav Publishing House, Inc., New York, 1969, pp 324 – 5.
- Roback, A. A., Curiosities of Yiddish Literature, Sci - Art Publishers, Cambridge, Massachusetts, 1933, p 62, 192. "Der Tunkeler (J. Tunkel) ranks as the best parodist in Yiddish.", p 62.
- Roback, A. A., The Story of Yiddish Literature, Yiddish Scientific Institute, New York, 1940, p 353.
- Feinsilver, Mermin Lillian, The Taste of Yiddish, South Brunswick Publishers, New York, 1970, p 53, 187.
- Liptzin, Sol, A History of Yiddish Literature, Jonathan David Publishers, New York, 1972, p 274.
- Sadan, Dov, Ke'arot Egozim o Elef Bdikha ve Bdikha, (Nut Bowl or 1001 Jokes), M. Neuman Publishers, Tel Aviv, 1953 (5713), p 213 - 4.
- Gold, David L., "Towards a Critical Edition of Yoysef Tunkl's Notl Un Motl”, Jewish Linguistic Studies, 1989, pp 165 – 173.
- Sheintukh, Yekhiel, "HaBikoret, HaKhevratit-Tarbutit BiKhtavav HaHumoristi'im shel 'Der Tunkeler'" (The Socio-Cultural Criticism in Der Tunkeler's Humorous Writings), The 9th World Congress for Jewish Studies, 1985, pp 457 – 460.
- Sheintukh, Yekhiel, "An Areinfir tsu der Sugiya - Humor in der Yidisher Literatur un der Tunkeler", in Kabakoff, Jacob, Jewish Book Annual, Vol 44, New York, 1986 - 1987 (5747)
- Gotthelf, Yehuda, HaItonut HaYehudit SheHaitah (The Jewish Press That Was), HaIgud HaOlami shel HaItonim HaYehudim, Tel Aviv, 1973, pp. 86, 88, 91, 95, 111, 117, 123, 163, 195, 226, 232, 343.
- Davidon, Yakov, "Lapitch VeTil Oylenshpigel" in Bobruisk Yizkor Book, Tel Aviv, pp 773 – 80 (see pp 775, 779)
- Dluzhshnavsky, M., "Yosef Tunkel (Der Tunkeler): Zayne Letzte Yaren in Nyu York", (Joseph Tunkel (Der Tunkeler): His Last Years in New York), A"Ts, 326,2 (1969) 36 - 39.
