= Saul Raskin =

American cartoonist

- Self Portrait, 1950
- Born: 1878; Nogaisk, Russian Empire (now Prymorsk, Ukraine)
- Died: 1966; New York City
- Known for: Painting, illustration, printmaking

Saul Raskin (Russian: Саул Раскин, Hebrew: שאול רסקין; 1878–1966) was a Russian born American artist, writer, lecturer and teacher best known for his depiction of Jewish subjects.

== Early life and studies ==
Raskin was born in 1878 in Nogaisk in the Russian Empire now known as Prymorsk in Ukraine. He studied lithography in Odessa and then traveled extensively in Germany, France, Italy and Switzerland visiting art schools and working as a lithographer. Raskin immigrated to the United States arriving in New York City in 1904 or 1905.

== Career ==
=== Yiddish press ===
As a Russian speaker, Raskin became fluent in Yiddish after having come into contact with the literary community of the Lower East Side neighborhood of Manhattan.

==== Satirical cartoonist ====
He worked as a cartoonist and caricaturist for the New York-based Yiddish publications including Kibitzer (Yiddish for a person who offers unsolicited views, advice, or criticism), which later was rebranded as Der Groyser Kundes (The Big Stick or The Big Prankster), a New York-based satirical weekly. He also regularly contributed cartoons to Yiddish newspapers in Europe. Raskin's cartoons sometimes portrayed the differences between Jewish life in Eastern Europe and in the United States as tales of "metamorphoses". In a cartoon from Der Groyser Kundes in 1909, Raskin employed a cantor, a person ethnomusicologist Mark Slobin, Professor of Music at Wesleyan University regards as serving as "representatives of the group's strivings" for American Jewish audiences in 20th-century America. Raskin's Yiddish caption said "In the Old World, he was a cantor named Zelikovitsh; in America he is an Italian tenor named Signor Zelkonini".

==== Critic ====
Raskin was a prolific critic of the visual arts, literature and theatre. He wrote articles for various New York based Yiddish language publications including Tsayt-gayst (The Spirit of the Times), the libertarian socialist periodical Freie Arbeiter Stimme (The Free Voice of Labor), the monthly socialist journal Die Zukunft or Di Tsukunft (The Future) for which he wrote forty three articles and Chaim Zhitlowsky's literary and philosophical Dos Naye Lebn (The New Life) published between 1908 and 1914. In 1907, he wrote an article for the weekly Zeitgeist published between 1905 and 1908 by The Forward, titled Der proletariat un der kunst (The proletariat and art). Raskin was the art and theater critic for Abraham Reisen's Yiddish language weekly Dos Naye Land (The New Country), an "illustrated weekly of literature, art, criticism and culture", launched in 1911. In the 17 November 1911 edition, Raskin wrote an article titled An Exhibition of Jewish Artists, A Proclamation in which he proposed that Jewish artists exhibitions should be held and suggested practical ways to organize them. The following week, Dos Naye Land published a letter to the editor from a writer opposing Raskin's suggestion on the grounds that "good artists" would refuse to exhibit and suggesting that art appreciation in the Jewish community should be cultivated by first exhibiting reproductions of good art in public places. Raskin wrote about The Future of Jewish Art in another article for Dos Naye Land in 1911 in which he discussed the inability to find a common Jewish characteristic in the works of artists such as Mark Antokolski, Jozef Israëls, Max Liebermann, and Camille Pissarro. Raskin suggested that rather than examining the various techniques, forms, and styles used by Jewish artists, "Jewish Art" might emerge by examining the common subject matter and themes in his contemporaries' work, specifically in genre and history paintings. Raskin's articles advocating what he regarded as the humanitarian and demographic value of art rooted in folk themes were amongst the earliest articles on art in Yiddish.

=== Educational and cultural work ===
Raskin worked to bring Jewish art to the attention of the Jewish public. He believed that art should not be the exclusive preserve of the wealthy and that by collaborating with artists, the public's interest in art could be cultivated. He conducted museum tours and lectured on art for the Arbeter Ring (Workmen's Circle). In 1910, the Arbeter Ring Education Committee (EC) was formed to oversee its members educational and cultural development. In 1914 the EC organized ten guided tours of New York art museums most of which were conducted by Raskin. The "shpatsirungen" (strolls) as they were called could draw as many as four to five hundred people. The museums participated by remaining open at special times and providing rooms for lectures at no cost. Raskin's guided tours included a short historical overview of the exhibits highlighting the prominent artists and their works. Raskin carried out similar educational work outside of New York.

In the 1930s Raskin served as the art director for the 92nd Street Young Men's and Young Women's Hebrew Association (92nd Street Y) in New York.

=== Visual art ===
Raskin was probably known more as a painter and caricaturist within the American Jewish community than as a critic. He worked in various media and was known for his realist approach and attention to detail. His work focused on scenes of Jewish life and tradition particularly on the Lower East Side of Manhattan. His first exhibition was in 1922. Raskin's paintings, sketches and lithographs portraying Jewish life in the Yishuv in Palestine were well known in the U. S. having appeared in many exhibitions and the press. They were widely praised by art critics. The lobby of a theater at the corner of Second Avenue and Eleventh Street, at the northern end of the "Yiddish Broadway" in the Yiddish Theater District on the Lower East Side was decorated with his paintings of Palestine. He made a number of trips to Palestine, at least four between 1921 and 1937, five by 1947 and later to Israel. He stayed at the kibbutz Ramat Yochanan while in the British mandate for Palestine. In 1947 Raskin published Land of Palestine which contained "more than 300 drawings and paintings made during the artist's five visits to Palestine, together with short essays on Palestinian life." He produced poster art to support the Zionist movement. His poster Stand Up and Be Counted from the 1930s shows a central figure of a tall and determined American Jew holding up a Shekel surrounded on one side by images of destruction and on the other by images of a brighter future in a Jewish homeland promised by contributing to the Zionist organization.

Cover of Hebrew Rhapsody (1959)

=== Illustrated books ===
Raskin provided illustrations for a number of Hebrew texts such as Pirkei Avot: Sayings of the Fathers (1940), the Haggadah for Passover (1941), Tehilim. The Book of Psalms (1942), the Siddur (1945), Five Megiloth: Song of Songs, Ruth, Lamentations, Ecclesiastes, Esther (1949), the Kabbalah in Word and Image (1952), and other books such as Aron Hakodesh: Jewish Life And Lore (1955) and Between God and Man: Hebrew Rhapsody in 100 Drawings (1959). Aron Hakodesh (The Holy Ark) illustrates the life of a boy named Moishele from his Bar Mitzvah to marriage, to teaching his own children and in his old age, his grandchildren reflecting the idea of passing down traditional Jewish wisdom. The last pages are about Israel and the Promised Land. The book includes games, jokes, and folklore with about 150 illustrations with Yiddish and English descriptions. Hebrew Rhapsody contained sections on "Moses the prophet supreme", "Samson the tragic hero", "Job the good man", "the Golem", "a wedding in town", "the Hasidim who serve God with joy" together with a set of drawings on the Land of Israel to mark the tenth anniversary of the State of Israel with the final pages describing his experience as an artist. Raskin described the book as a "Rhapsody in the medium of graphic art" and "An ode to my people, my wonderful 'old and young again' people." In 1960 Raskin published the book The New Face of Israel. In 1962, when Raskin was in his eighties, he published Personal surrealism, an illustrated book that included his thoughts on surrealism, dreams and his life in a mixture of Hebrew and English.

== Political and personal views ==
Politically, Raskin described himself as initially an "International Marxist", then a "Social Revolutionist", later a "Bundist" and after World War I, a "Jewish Nationalist". Following the Balfour Declaration, Raskin became an ardent Zionist.

On Raskin's eightieth birthday he said "I am an artist and I am a Jew, but first and above all, I am a Jewish artist, for Jewishness is the source, the centrality, the essence of my art, as it is the essence of my being."

== Artists' societies membership ==
Raskin was a member of the American Watercolor Society, the Society of American Etchers, the Audubon Artists and the New York Watercolor Club.

== Personal life ==
Raskin married Rae Malis. They had at least one son, Eugene Raskin.

Raskin's wife Rae also wrote for a number of publications such as the mass circulation Yiddish daily nationalist-Zionist newspaper Der tog (The Day) in the late 1910s and the nonpartisan Froyen zhurnal (The Jewish Women's Home Journal) in the early 1920s. In Der tog, her articles were intended to educate women in basic civics but she also addressed topics like home decoration and beauty. In Froyen zshurnal, she provided instructions in civics which she hoped would demonstrate how governing related "to the woman, her home economics, her and her family's health, raising her children, etc.". She also wrote articles about Federal and State governments and the setting up and organization of a woman's club.

Raskin died in New York in 1966.

== Archives ==
The Yeshiva University in New York maintain a collection of cards, newspaper clippings, correspondence, and publicity forms covering the period 1960 – 1966.

== Published works ==
- Raskin, Saul (1925). The Land of Israel in word and picture, 1921-1924 (in Yiddish). Saul Raskin.
- Raskin, Saul (1940). Pirkei Avot: Sayings of the Fathers. Saul Raskin/Academy Photo-offset, New York.
- Raskin, Saul (1941). Haggadah for Passover. Saul Raskin/Academy Photo-offset, New York.
- Raskin, Saul (1942). Tehilim. The Book of Psalms. Saul Raskin/Academy Photo-offset, New York.
- Raskin, Saul (1945). Siddur. Saul Raskin/Academy Photo-offset, New York.
- Raskin, Saul (1947). Land of Palestine. Saul Raskin/Academy Photo-offset, New York.
- Raskin, Saul (1949). Five Megiloth: Song of Songs, Ruth, Lamentations, Ecclesiastes, Esther. Hebrew Publishing Co.
- Raskin, Saul (1955). Aron Hakodesh: Jewish Life And Lore. Saul Raskin/Academy Photo-offset, New York.
- Raskin, Saul (1957). Go Back and Tell: A Mystic Novel. Whittier Books, New York.
- Raskin, Saul (1959). Between God and Man: Hebrew Rhapsody in 100 Drawings. Saul Raskin/Academy Photo-offset, New York.
- Raskin, Saul (1960). The New Face of Israel. Saul Raskin/Academy Photo-offset, New York.
- Raskin, Saul (1962). Personal surrealism. Saul Raskin/Academy Photo-offset, New York.

== Books illustrated by Raskin ==
- Dantsis, Mordekhai. Heymland (Homeland) (in Yiddish). Oriom Press Inc.
- K. Tepper; Leon Savage (1917). Baruch Vladeck (ed.). From Heart's Death: a book of suffering and struggle (Fun der iefenish fun harts: a bukh fun lider un ampf) (in Yiddish). Miller & Hillman, New York. (Volume I, Volume II)
- Magidoff, Jacob. Der shpigel fun der Ist Sayd (The Mirrors of the East Side) (in Yiddish). Published by the Author, 1923.
