= Herbert A. Friedman =

American rabbi

Herbert A. Friedman (1918–2008) was an American Reform rabbi who served as the CEO of the United Jewish Appeal and was the founding president of the Wexner Foundation. He inspired the Wexner Heritage Program seminars, which have now been educating Jewish community leaders for over two decades. He co-founded the foundation in 1985 with Leslie Wexner, chairman of Limited Brands, and served for a decade as president. For more than two decades before that he was executive chairman of the national United Jewish Appeal, where he designed and led the missions to Israel that became the basis for much of the American Jewish community's support for Israel.

Friedman was born to poor immigrant parents in New Haven, Connecticut, in 1918, went to public schools, and was admitted to Yale, graduating in 1938. He worked as a short-order cook and on a factory line during and after college. He studied for the Reform rabbinate in New York and was posted to Denver's Temple Emanuel as assistant rabbi in 1943, but came into conflict with the community and other Reform rabbis over his intense Zionism.

He left to become a U.S. Army chaplain and at the end of World War II and later in collaboration with the Hagana (the nucleus of the Israeli Defense Forces) under David Ben-Gurion, he was deeply involved in rescuing Jewish refugees from displaced persons camps in Europe and in the immigration, legal and otherwise (Aliyah Bet), of many thousands of those Jews to Israel. When he returned to the U.S., in collaboration with the Irish Republican Army and its agents in North America, he ran guns and other weapons to Israel during its war for independence.

He served the United Jewish Appeal (precursor of today's United Jewish Communities/Federations of North America) from 1947 to 1982, including 17 years as CEO and executive vice-chairman. During his tenure as CEO, annual fundraising for Israel and other Jewish causes rose from $50 million to $450 million. These funds helped needy Jews throughout the world in addition to supporting Israel's immigration and social-welfare programs.

Friedman created the UJA Young Leadership Program, which prepared thousands of younger Jews for philanthropic leadership, and designed the now-common donor missions to Israel. The Wexner Heritage Foundation Seminars have gone beyond training for philanthropy to provide Jewish community leaders in mid-career with an intensive two-year education in all aspects of Judaism and Jewish civilization. Alumni have started Jewish schools and synagogues, written books, and served in the U.S. Congress, among other achievements.

In 1997, when a leading Holocaust historian, Deborah Lipstadt, was sued by David Irving for labeling him a Holocaust denier, Friedman raised some $2 million for a successful defense in the British courts; the defense required among other things proving that the Holocaust had happened.

Friedman also fought for causes not explicitly Jewish, as when he repeatedly spoke out, in the face of threats, against Senator Joseph McCarthy's campaign to root out alleged communists. He was known as a strong advocate for an increased role for women in Jewish leadership.

His 2001 autobiography, Roots of the Future, was praised by Israeli President Shimon Peres and author Leon Uris. In this book he stated his four core beliefs: in the distinctive identity of the Jewish people and their role in the betterment of all people; in their sacred claim to a homeland in Israel; in Judaism's religious, ethical and literary gifts to humanity; and, paradoxically, in the dispersal of the Jewish people across time and space as an integral part of their creative genius. Friedman died on March 31, 2008, at the age of 89.
