= Wexner Foundation =

Philanthropic organisation

The Wexner Foundation
- Formation: 1983; 43 years ago
- Headquarters: New Albany, Ohio, United States
- President: B. Elka Abrahamson
- Revenue: $15,181,043 (2015)
- Expenses: $15,288,406 (2015)
- Website: wexnerfoundation.org

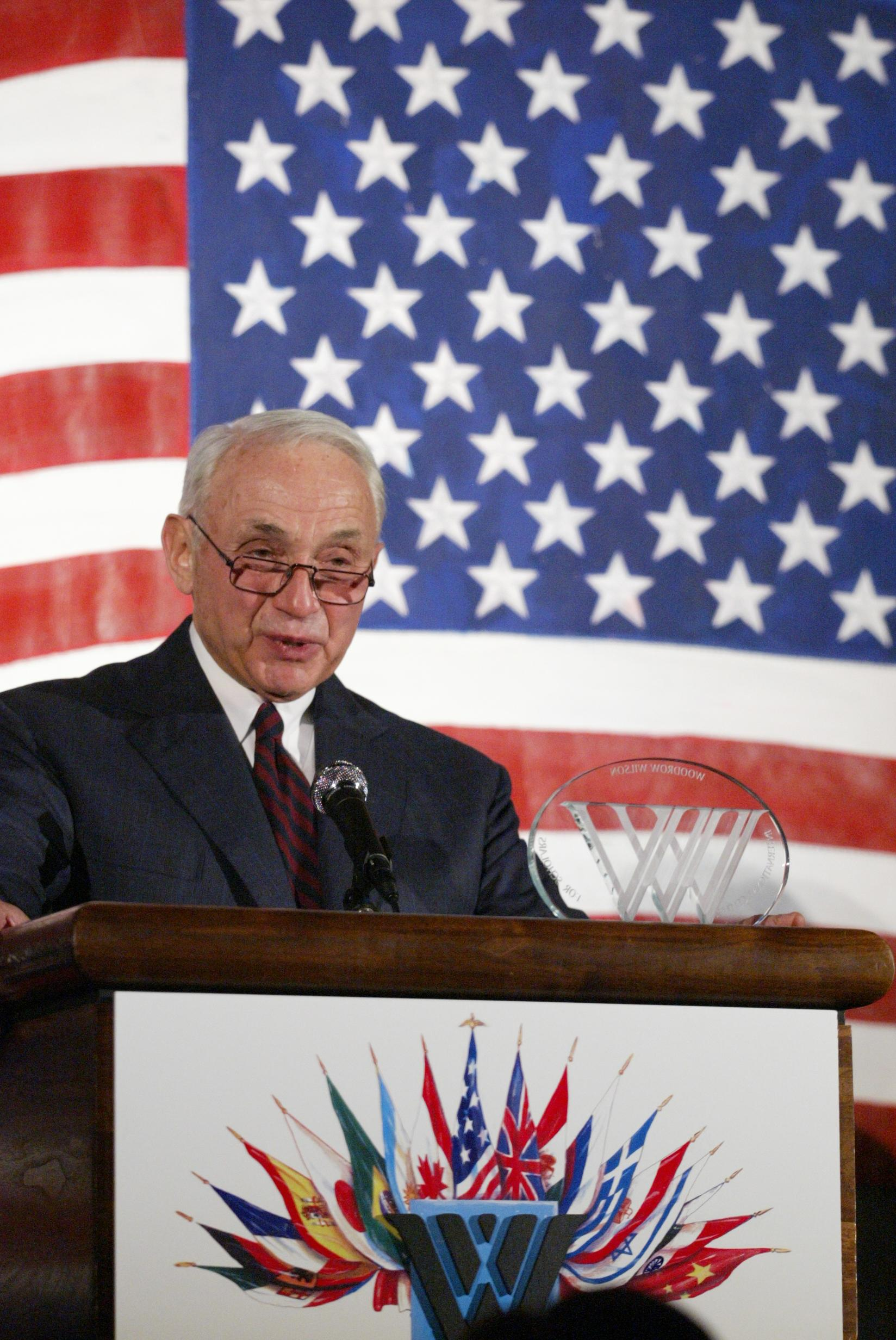
Leslie Wexner receives the Woodrow Wilson Award for Corporate Citizenship.

The Wexner Foundation is an American philanthropic organization which focuses on developing Jewish professional and volunteer leaders in North America and public leaders in Israel. Founded by Les Wexner, CEO of Limited Brands, in 1983, its headquarters are located in New Albany, Ohio, with additional offices in New York City and Jerusalem. In addition to their offered leadership programs, the Wexner Foundation supports other Jewish charities as well.

== History ==
In the early 1980s, Leslie Wexner founded two separate organizations designed to foster strong leadership in Israel's public sector, and Jewish professional and volunteer leadership in North America. The Wexner Heritage Program was created to strengthen volunteer leaders. The Wexner Graduate Fellowship was created for emerging professional Jewish leaders and in 2006 was renamed The Wexner Graduate Fellowship/Davidson Scholars Program when the William Davidson Foundation joined as a partner. The Wexner Israel Fellowship was created for mid-career Israeli public officials. In the 1990s, Abigail Wexner joined her husband in charting the Wexner philanthropic vision and their roles as chairmen. In 2003, the two foundations merged, and since then The Wexner Foundation has run its programs as a unified organization under the couple's leadership. The Foundation has also added new programs to expand upon its mission of strengthening Jewish leaders. Since 2013, The Wexner Foundation has launched five additional programs: Wexner Service Corps (2013), Wexner Field Fellowship (2013), Wexner Senior Leaders (2014-2023), Wexner Davidson Fellowship (2024) and Wexner Resilient Leaders (2025). Since 2023, three programs have ended – Wexner Graduate Fellowship/Davidson Scholars Program, Wexner Israel Fellows, and Wexner Senior Leaders.

The first of the foundation's core programs was founded in 1985. Leslie Wexner and Herbert A. Friedman, the former CEO of the National United Jewish Appeal, established the Wexner Heritage Program. This program's mission statement, according to the Wexner Foundation website, is "to educate Jewish communal leaders in the history, thought, traditions, and contemporary challenges of the Jewish people."

In 1988, the Wexner Graduate Fellowship Program was founded by the Wexner Foundation. It awards scholarships to 20 exceptional individuals in North America who wish to obtain degrees in Jewish education, Jewish leadership, rabbinical studies, or cantorate studies. The mission of this program is "to encourage promising candidates to successfully meet the challenges of professional Jewish leadership in the North American Jewish community." In 2006, the Wexner Foundation brought in the William Davidson Foundation as a partner and the program was renamed the Wexner Graduate Fellowship/Davidson Scholars Program. The program ended in 2023.

The Wexner Israel Fellowship Program was created in 1989 and ended in 2024. It was a partnership between the Wexner Foundation and Harvard University's John F. Kennedy School of Government. The program annually selected up to 10 Israeli public officials and/or nonprofit leaders to participate in leadership seminars while they pursued a mid-career Master of Public Administration (MPA) degree at the Kennedy School. The goal of this program, according to the Wexner Foundation website, is "to provide Israel's next generation of public leaders with advanced training in public management and leadership development, thus enhancing the quality of democracy and the institutional vitality of Israel's public sector".

American financier Jeffrey Epstein was a trustee of the foundation from 1992 to 2007, the year before his first conviction for sexual offenses. Epstein, according to The New York Times, held "an unusually strong hold on Mr. Wexner," and "[h]eld the title of President of the Wexner family financial office."

In October 2018, Israeli reporter Erel Segal reported the Wexner Foundation had transferred $2.3 million to Ehud Barak for unknown work between 2004 and 2006. The transfer had been described as payment for research. On October 29 Maariv (through its Israeli radio station) reported that Barak had been given the funds while he was a private citizen and the fund transfer was under investigation. However, on November 6 a call for investigation by the attorney general of Israel had been filed. The following day, it was reported that contrary to initial claims, the Wexner funds had been transferred to Barak while he may not have been a private person.

The Wexner Foundation headquarters are located in New Albany, Ohio with an office in Jerusalem, Israel. The president of the Wexner Foundation is B. Elka Abrahamson.

In October 2023, the Wexner Foundation severed ties with Harvard University due to dissatisfaction with how the university responded to antisemitism and Jewish concerns on campus after the October 7, 2023 Hamas massacre in the surprise attack on Israel.

In April 2026, some victims of Epstein filed lawsuits against both the Wexner Foundation and Wexner.

== See also ==
- Ohio State University Wexner Medical Center
- Wexner Center for the Arts
