= Rocky Mountain College of Art and Design =

For-profit art school in Lakewood, Colorado

Rocky Mountain College of Art + Design
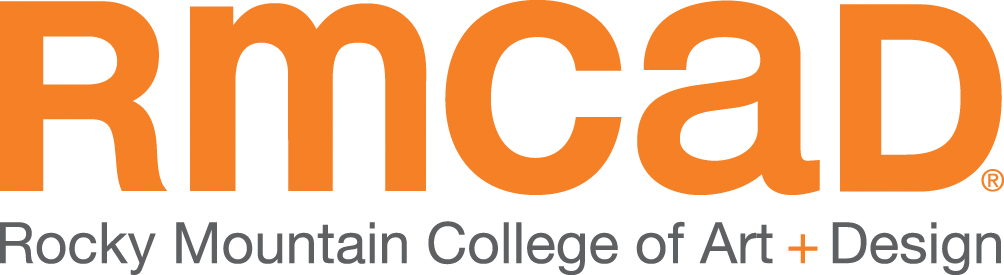
- Type: Private for-profit art school
- Established: 1963
- President: Brent Fitch
- Faculty: 73
- Administrative staff: 150
- Location: Lakewood, Colorado, U.S. 39°44′37″N 105°4′12″W
- Campus: Urban, 23 acres (9.3 ha)
- Colors: Orange and black
- Nickname: RMCAD
- Website: www.rmcad.edu

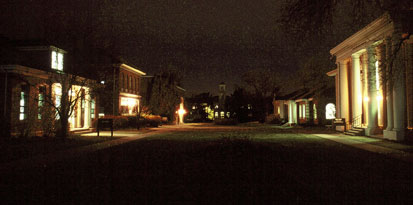
RMCAD's Lakewood, Colorado Campus at night

The Rocky Mountain College of Art + Design (RMCAD) is a private for-profit art school in Lakewood, Colorado. The college was founded in 1963 by Philip J. Steele, an artist and teacher.

== History ==
RMCAD was established in January 1963 by Philip J. Steele, an artist and educator, who purchased the Art for All Studios school from Dorothea Seeley Shulenburg. Steele renamed the school "Rocky Mountain School of Art" as a proprietorship and later incorporated the school on September 11, 1972.

The college relocated several times as it increased enrollment. In 2003, the college moved from its three-building Denver location to its current in the suburb of Lakewood.

In 2010, Bill Heavener, Ed Haddock, and Jon Phelp who own Full Sail University purchased a controlling share of the college from the Steele family, and began an initiative to restructure the college and curriculum. In 2014, amidst a turnover of a significant number of key faculty, RMCAD rescheduled its in-person campus courses to align with the scheduling of online classes, and to cut costs moved most liberal arts courses online.

== Accreditation ==
RMCAD is accredited by the Higher Learning Commission (HLC) and the National Association of Schools of Art and Design. The Interior Design program is accredited by the Council for Interior Design Accreditation.

== Students ==
The approximately 1,400 undergraduate students represent a student body of 66% female, 34% male, 41% minority, and international students. Seventy-nine percent of students are out-of-state.

The average age of on-campus students is 23 and the average online student is 30.

== Campus ==
Rocky Mountain College of Art + Design campus comprises 23 acres (9.3 ha).

Currently, the campus has 17 structures, 11 of which are devoted to classrooms, common areas, and other support spaces, including four galleries and studio spaces. The campus is the former site of the Jewish Consumptives' Relief Society, included in the National Register of Historic Places listings in Jefferson County, Colorado, and is located in the 40 West Arts District close to Casa Bonita.
