= Yehuda Leib Ginsburg =

American rabbi (1888–1946)

Rabbi Yehuda Leib Ginsburg
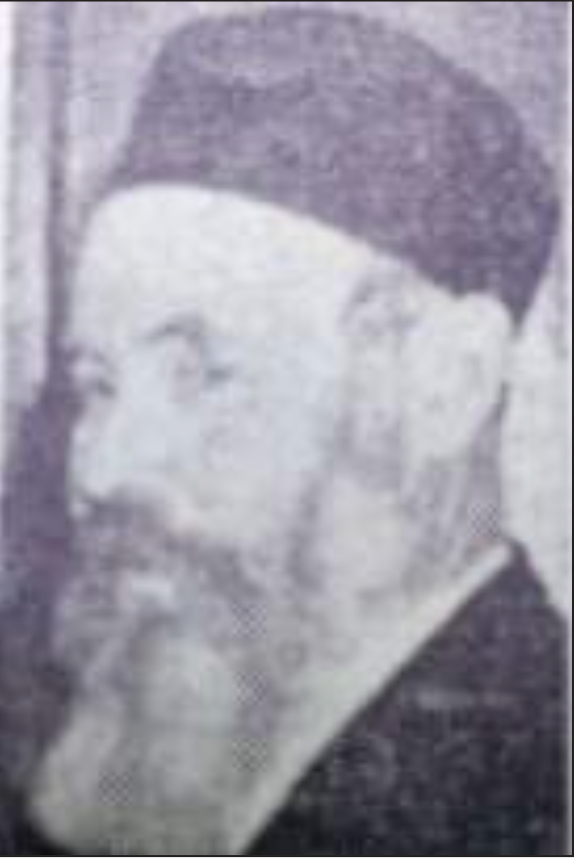
- Ginsburg as pictured in his Intermountain Jewish News obituary

Personal life
- Born: 1888 Daugavpils, Latvia
- Died: 1946 (aged 57–58) Denver, Colorado
- Spouse: Eta Ginsburg
- Children: 2

Religious life
- Religion: Judaism
- Synagogue: Congregation Zera Israel
- Yahrtzeit: 27 Tishrei 5707

Yehuda Leib Ginsburg (1888–1946) was a posek and Talmudic scholar in Yaroslavl, Russia, and later in Denver, CO, in the early 20th century. He is most well known for his commentary on the Mishna which he entitled Musar HaMishna, as well as his commentary on the early prophets, titled Musar Hanevim. He also wrote a commentary on the Torah called Yalkut Yehuda and a smaller volume about the essence of Shabbat called Keter HaShabbat. Throughout his works he consistently mines the ethical values found within what seems to be dry legal code. Despite his brilliance Rabbi Ginsburg was known in Denver as being easily approachable and for the warmth he showed to all whom he encountered. He served as the president of the Denver Council of Orthodox Rabbis and was an executive board member for the National Mizrachi and the Union of Orthodox Rabbis. He was also an active member of the Vaad Hatzala Board of Directors.

== Biography ==
Yehuda Leib Ginsburg was born in Daugavpils, Latvia (formerly Dvinsk) in 1888. In his youth he studied under Rabbi Meir Simcha of Dvinsk and Rabbi Chaim Ozer Grodzinski as well as Rabbi Aryeh Leib Rubin of Wilkomirer. He went on to be a Rosh Yeshiva in Eishykok, Lithuania and Rezhitsa, Latvia, and he later became a community rabbi in Yaroslavl, Russia. He and his wife Eta had two children. Moishe (Morris) was born in 1920 and Yudis (Judith) was born in 1925. Throughout the Russian Revolution many attempts were made to move Rabbi Ginsburg and his family to the US, but they all proved to be unsuccessful.

In March 1931 Rabbi Ginsburg was finally able to leave Yaroslavl and settle in the US. The rest of the Ginsburgs followed in October of that year, and while the family originally settled in New Haven, CT they moved to New York, NY soon after their arrival. Later that year Yehuda Leib was diagnosed with tuberculosis. He was originally treated at the Hebraic Sanitarium in Browns Mills, NJ, but was then moved to the Jewish Consumptives' Relief Society (JCRS) in Denver, CO to receive more intensive care. He was admitted to the JCRS on February 3, 1932, while the rest of his family remained in New York.

Although his original intention was to return to New York upon his recovery, by April 1932 Rabbi Ginsburg had decided that he wanted to remain in Denver permanently. His family followed him to Denver later that year, and on June 30, 1932, Rabbi Ginsburg left the sanitarium to succeed Rabbi Isaac A. Braude as the rabbi of Congregation Zera Israel on the west side of Denver. Although he only received a small stipend from the congregation, a fund was started to support Rabbi Ginsburg and his family as he worked on writing and publishing his books. Despite their ideological differences Jews from all religious backgrounds donated to the fund.

Rabbi Ginsburg and his wife Eta were known for their hospitality. In Pioneers, Peddlers, and Tsadikim Ida Uchill wrote that "his home was one of the friendliest and most hospitable in the city. There were always five or six guests eating with him while his fragile wife served them. His genius did not prevent him from being one of the most easily approachable men in the community, and his pleasant wit made everyone comfortable with him." Rabbi Ginsburg was admitted to the JCRS three times in his last year of life. He died on October 22, 1946. According to Libby Rosen (one of the attendees at Rabbi Ginsburg's funeral) the funeral procession went on for "blocks and blocks." In 1959 a new synagogue was built for congregation Zera Israel in his honor.

== Works ==
In most of his works (especially Musar HaMishna) Ginsburg tries to find ethical teachings within the legal framework of the Mishna or the text of the Torah/Nevi'im. In the introductions to his books he laments the fact that the Torah teachers of his generation have not adapted their style to fit their students' needs. They continue to teach "dry" matters of Halacha without realizing that their students are not receptive to their style. He also expresses concern that several scholars who are well versed in Torah and Halacha fail to uphold the moral principles that the Torah conveys. In an attempt to solve both of these problems he weaves moral values into what seems to be dry legal code throughout his books.

In Yalkut Yehuda and Musar Hanevim Ginsburg collects Midrashim and the words of the commentators above and presents his own commentary below via footnotes. In Keter HaShabbat he presents a collection of essays relating to the day of Shabbat as well as commentaries on Pirkei Avot, Shir HaShirim and Barchi Nafshi. Between the years 1933-1943 Ginsburg was able to publish 10 different books. In an act of humility he attributed his successes to the Denver Jewish community and the Torah scholars who resided there.

Regarding Yalkut Yehuda on Vayikra Dr. J. W. Marcus of the Jewish Courier wrote "The esteemed author shows in his third volume the same great knowledge of the Talmudic and Midrashic literature as he did in his previous volumes on Genesis and Exodus. He takes the ‘dry’ passages of Torat Cohanim and turns them into golden chains on to which he strings the colorful, sparkling gems that are strewn throughout the Talmuds, Mechilta, Midrashim, Yalkutim, and other writings of our ancient, sublime, religious literature. It is desirable, therefore, that our Jewish intelligentsia who find no opportunity to search through the depths of our sea of learning, should peruse the Yalkut Yehudah by Rabbi Ginsburg. They will be fascinated."

Rabbi Ginsburg's books (with links to hebrewbooks.org):

- Yalkut Yehuda - Sefer Bereshit Original version. Essays in this volume differ from those in the other volume. Published in 1931.
- Yalkut Yehuda - Sefer Bereshit 2 Published in 1936.
- Yalkut Yehuda - Sefer Shmot Published in 1933.
- Yalkut Yehuda - Sefer Vayikra Published in 1934.
- Yalkut Yehuda - Sefer Bamidbar Published in 1934.
- Yalkut Yehuda - Sefer Devarim Published 1935.
- Musar HaMishna - Seder Zeraim Published in 1939.
- Musar HaMishna - Seder Moed Published in 1939.
- Musar HaMishna - Seder Nezikin Published in 1943.
- Musar HaMishna - Seder Nashim Published in 1943.
- Keter HaShabbat Published in 1940.
- Musar HaNevim - First Prophets vol 1 Published in 1945.
- Musar HaNevim - First Prophets vol 2 Published in 1945.

Rabbi Ginsburg's works, particularly Yalkut Yehuda, are frequently cited in the "Surf a Little Torah" feature of Yeshivat Har Etzion's Virtual Beit Midrash.
