= Hillel Goldberg =

American newspaper publisher

Rabbi Hillel Goldberg is an American newspaper publisher, author, scholar of modern Jewish history, and student of the Musar movement. He is editor and publisher of the Intermountain Jewish News in Denver, Colorado, and an ordained rabbi.

== Early life and education ==
Goldberg was born and raised in Denver, Colorado. He later reflected on the independent streak of Jews in the West, including Denver, that shaped him. Goldberg began his journalism career as a student at George Washington High School, where he published Tempo magazine with Richard Gould. Tempo was featured in Time.

== Higher education ==
Goldberg attended University of California Berkeley, where he tutored minority children in music in Oakland, 1964-1965, and wrote on the Free Speech Movement for Frontier magazine. He completed his undergraduate degree at Yeshiva University, where he was a leading student activist, founding the university's chapter of the Student Struggle for Soviet Jewry in 1965; tutoring for Head Start in Harlem 1965-1966; co-leading the effort to save the books at Jewish Theological Seminary after a fire in 1966; co-organizing the effort to send volunteers to Israel on the eve of the Six Day War in late May and early June 1967; and founding an underground student newspaper, Pulse, in 1968. Goldberg earned a PhD in Near Eastern and Judaic Studies at Brandeis University.

== Journalism ==
Goldberg became editor and publisher of the Intermountain Jewish News in 2017. He had previously served as executive editor. His mother Miriam Goldberg and father Max Goldberg published the newspaper before him (Miriam from 1972-2017; Max from 1943-1972). Goldberg’s weekly column “View From Denver” is the longest-running column in Jewish journalism. He has won more Simon Rockower Awards for Excellence in Jewish Journalism than any other person.

Goldberg has worked for the Intermountain Jewish News since 1966. From 1972-1975 he was its Jerusalem correspondent, then from 1975 to 1983 its Israel correspondent. Throughout, he wrote a weekly column, "The View from Jerusalem", for the Intermountain Jewish News, and reviewed books for the Jerusalem Post.

David K. Shipler, The New York Times correspondent in Israel at the time, later wrote of Goldberg in Arab and Jew: Wounded Spirits in a Promised Land: "I sat over these questions [about the Sabra and Shatila massacres] with my friend Hillel Goldberg, a young lecturer at Hebrew University in Jewish ethics and intellectual history. He was a religious man with a graceful, fine precision of compassion in his reasoning, and our long discussion brought a valuable clarity to my own thinking."

Goldberg's book Israel Salanter: Text, Structure, Idea won the Academic Book Award of the Year award from Choice.

== Jewish thought and community life ==
During the 1970s, Goldberg taught at Michlalah-Jerusalem College for Women. In the 1980s he served as a lecturer in Modern Jewish Thought at the Hebrew University and taught Musar at Jerusalem Torah College (BMT). In 1986, he co-founded an Orthodox Jewish community within a Reform temple in Santa Fe, New Mexico.

Goldberg is considered an expert on the Musar movement, having published books on Rabbi Israel Salanter and other aspects of the movement. Numerous yeshiva deans and heads of musar organizations describe his book The Fire Within as life-changing, with Dr. Alan Morinis, founder of The Mussar Institute, writing "it was the introduction to my spiritual lineage....it holds a special place (for me)." Rabbi Micha Berger notes it was the book "which inspired me to explore musar," a topic which was to become central to his life as founder of the AishDas Society.

In addition to his books on Musar, Goldberg has authored English-language books on Jewish transition figures from Eastern Europe and Shabbat, as well as a Hebrew-language supercommentary on the Vilna Gaon regarding the Halachot (Jewish laws) of mikveh, the Jewish ritual bath.

Goldberg has served on the editorial board of numerous national Jewish publications as well. In 1987, he became the first person to serve in the role of contributing editor for the Jewish Action, and has remained in that role ever since. Goldberg is also the longest serving editor for Tradition: A Journal of Orthodox Jewish Thought, having served in various editorial capacities since 1976.

== Selected bibliography ==
- Musar Anthology. Harwich Lithograph. 1972. Library of Congress #: 72-91473.
- Israel Salanter, text, structure, idea: the ethics and theology of an early psychologist of the unconscious. Ktav. 1982. ISBN 9780870687099. OCLC 7735192.
- The Fire Within. Artscroll Mesorah. 1987. ISBN 9780899065526.
- Between Berlin to Slobodka: Jewish Transition Figures from Eastern Europe (3rd ed.). Ktav. 2021. ISBN 978-1602804395.
- Illuminating the Generations. Artscroll Mesorah. 1992. ISBN 9780899068695.
- The Unexpected Road: Storied Jewish Lives Around the World. Feldheim. 2013. ISBN 9781598269703.
- Countdown to Shabbos. Menucha Press. 2018. ISBN 978-1614656784.
- Across the Expanse of Jewish Thought. Ktav. 2022. ISBN 978-1602804616
