= Der Groyser Kundes =

Satirical weekly

- Type: weekly newspaper
- Founder: Yosef Tunkel
- Founded: 1909
- Ceased publication: 1927
- Language: Yiddish
- Country: United States

Der Groyser Kundes (Yiddish: דער גרױסער קונדס, The Big Stick or The Big Prankster) was a New York City, Yiddish language satirical weekly which ran from 1909 until 1927. It was entitled Der Kibitser for its first year of production.

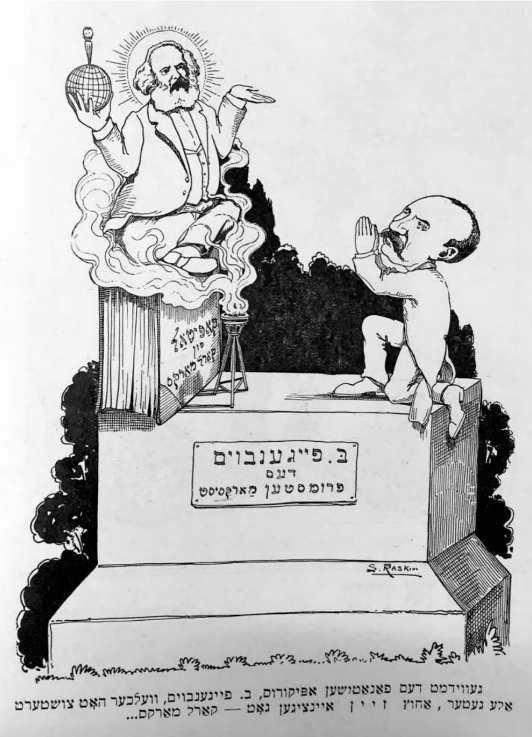
"B. Feigenbaum who rejects all gods except his own, Karl Marx." Drawn by Saul Raskin and published by Der Groyser Kundes on October 25, 1912.

Founded by the humorist Yosef Tunkel (or Der tunkeler, his pen name, meaning 'The dark one'), the paper was taken on by Jacob Marinoff when Tunkel left to work for an established paper in Warsaw. It consciously set itself up in opposition to the serious Yiddish-language press of the time such as the socialist The Jewish Daily Forward. Though, naturally, more traditional religious Judaism did not escape its satire: the 1915 'Christmas' edition included a parodic conversation between Jesus and the prophet Elijah. Despite its irreverent attitude to everything, it also published poetry by Di Yunge ("The Young Ones"), poets such as Moyshe-Leyb Halpern and Zuni Maud. At its height it had a circulation of 35,000 but folded in 1927 due to flagging sales.
