= Jacob Marinoff =

American poet (1869–1964)

- יעקב מארינאװ
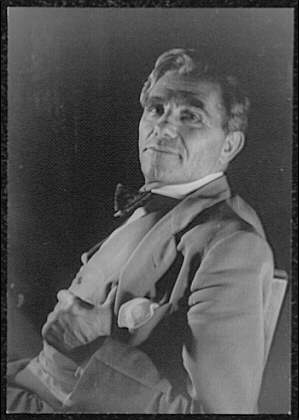
- Marinoff in 1932
- Born: December 3, 1869; Odessa, Russian Empire
- Died: October 27, 1964 (aged 94); The Bronx, New York City, U.S.
- Occupations: Poet; publisher; author
- Known for: Co-founder of Der Groyser Kundes (The Big Stick)
- Relatives: Fania Marinoff (sister); Carl Van Vechten (brother-in-law)

Jacob Marinoff (Yiddish: יעקב מארינאװ; 3 December 1869 – 27 October 1964) was a Russian-born American Yiddish publisher and author. He was one of the founders of New York satirical weekly Der Groyser Kundes ("The Big Stick"). He published three volumes of verse, and co-edited a satire collection.

== Early life ==
Marinoff was born on 3 December 1869 in Odessa in the Russian Empire (present-day Ukraine), where he received a traditional Jewish education. He arrived in England in 1891, and immigrated to the United States two years later.

== Jewish Consumptive Relief Society ==
Marinoff was part of the early fundraising efforts of the Jewish Consumptives' Relief Society (JCRS), which ran a tuberculosis sanatorium in Colorado. While based in New York, he collected money from Jewish fraternal orders, unions, ladies' auxiliaries, and more. Marinoff was also involved in The Sanatorium, a journal from the JCRS Press and Propaganda Committee that included reports from the JCRS, medical advice, human interest stories, poetry, and literature. One copy of The Sanatorium lists Marinoff as "Superintendent."

== Humor and poetry ==
In 1909, Marinoff co-founded the Yiddish satirical weekly The Big Stick with Joseph Tunkel. He took over the magazine entirely after Tunkel moved to Warsaw, and continued to run it until the magazine folded in 1927.

Beyond The Big Stick, Marinoff was the editor of Humor and Satire, a three-volume collection published in 1912. He wrote three volumes of poetry: Shpil un Kamp (Play and Fight) in 1938; and Mir Veln Zayn (We Will Be) and Shtark un Munter (Strong and Courageous) 1947.

== Personal life ==
Marinoff's sister was actress Fania Marinoff, and his brother-in-law was Harlem Renaissance novelist Carl Van Vechten. He died on 27 October 1964 at age 94 at Workmen's Circle Home for the Aged in the Bronx.
