= Charles E. H. Kauvar =

Lithuanian-American rabbi

Charles Eliezer Hillel Kauvar (August 14, 1879 – August 23, 1971) was a Lithuanian-American rabbi who served in Denver, Colorado, for 71 years.

== Early life and family ==
Kauvar was born on August 14, 1879, in Vilna, Vilna Governorate, Russia, the son of Solomon Kauvar and Rose De Waltoff. Kauvar immigrated to America in 1892, where the following year his widowed mother married Barnett Buchalter. They had three sons, including the notorious gangster Lepke Buchalter, executed at Sing Sing in 1944.

== Education and career ==
Kauvar went to College of the City of New York, where he received a B.A. in 1900, Columbia University, where he received an M.A. in 1901, and the Jewish Theological Seminary of America, where he was ordained a rabbi in 1902 and received a D.H.L. in 1909. In 1902, he was named rabbi of Beth HaMedrosh Hagodol (BMH) in Denver, Colorado. He was elected rabbi for life there in 1919. In 1905, he organized the Denver Hebrew School. In 1920, he became professor of rabbinic literature at the University of Denver. In 1929, he wrote Pirke Aboth Comments. He was a delegate to the first American Jewish Congress and president of the Denver Jewish Welfare Board.

An active communal leader, Kauvar helped establish the Jewish Consumptives' Relief Society in 1904 as well as Intermountain Jewish News. He served as president of the Central Jewish Council from 1912 to 1920. A lifelong Zionist, he was a founder of Mizrachi in Denver and has a colored stained glass window dedicated in his honor in the Heichal Shlomo in Jerusalem. A founder of the United Synagogue of America, he served as its first vice-president from 1912 to 1914 and became the first president of the Midwest Region of the Rabbinical Assembly in 1923. By the 1950s, he thought that Conservative Judaism lost its traditional moorings, and in 1955 he was instrumental in BMH disaffiliating from Conservative Judaism. It later became an Orthodox synagogue. He retired in 1952 and served as rabbi emeritus for the next 19 years. He continued teaching at the University of Denver until 1966.

In 1909, Kauvar married Belle G. Bluestone. She later died, and in 1937 he married Sara Sperber Gross. His children were Solomon S., Abraham Judah, and Golde Fage.

Kauvar died in Denver on August 23, 1971. He was buried in Sanhedria Cemetery in Jerusalem, Israel.
