= Yehoash =

Yiddish poet (1872–1927)

Solomon Blumgarten
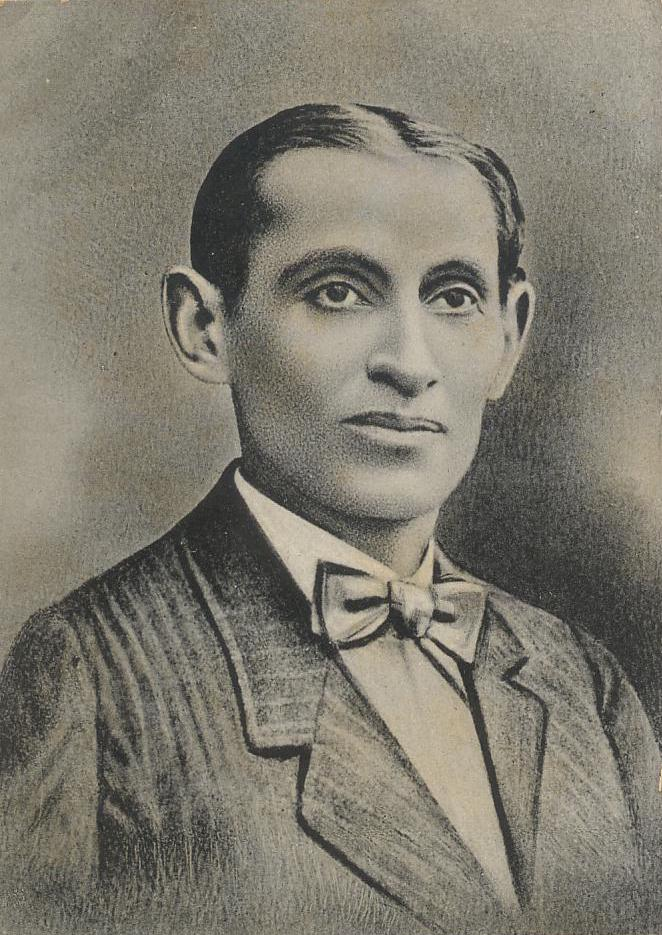
- Born: September 16, 1872; Virbalen, Lithuania
- Died: January 10, 1927 (aged 54); The Bronx, United States of America
- Writing career
- Pen name: Yehoash
- Language: Yiddish

Solomon Blumgarten (Yiddish: שלמה בלומגאַרטען; 16 September 1872 – 10 January 1927), known by his pen name Yehoash (יהואַש), was a Yiddish poet, scholar, and translator. Yehoash was "generally recognized by those familiar with [Yiddish] literature, as its greatest living poet and one of its most skillful raconteurs", according to The New York Times book review in 1923.

== Biography ==
Born in Virbalis in the Russian Empire (now Lithuania), he emigrated to the United States in 1890 and settled in New York City. For a decade he was a businessman, but wrote full-time starting in 1900 when he entered a sanitarium for tuberculosis.

A visit to Palestine in 1914 led him to write a three-volume work describing the trip and the country. His description was later translated into English as The Feet of the Messenger.

His literary output included verse, translations, poetry, short stories, essays and fables in Yiddish and some articles in English. His poetry was translated into Russian, Dutch, Polish, Finnish, German, Spanish, English and Hebrew.

He was responsible for translating many works of world literature into Yiddish, including Longfellow's Hiawatha and a very popular translation of the Hebrew Bible (Tanakh). His version of the Bible was hailed as a contribution of national significance and perhaps the greatest masterpiece in the Yiddish language. His two-volume edition became a standard work for Yiddish-speaking homes throughout the world. His other translations included parts of the Koran, classical Arabic writings and the Pirkei Avot.

With Charles David Spivak, he wrote a dictionary of the loshn koydesh (Mishnaic Hebrew and Jewish Babylonian Aramaic) elements of Yiddish, illustrated with idiomatic expressions and proverbs.

He died suddenly at his home at 943 Whitlock Avenue in The Bronx, where he lived with his wife, Flora, and his daughter, Evelyn Chave, at the time a student at Hunter College. At the time of his death, he was an editor at The Day newspaper.
