= Temple Emanuel (Denver) =

Reform Jewish congregation and historic synagogues in Denver, Colorado, US

- Hebrew: עִמָנוּאֵל
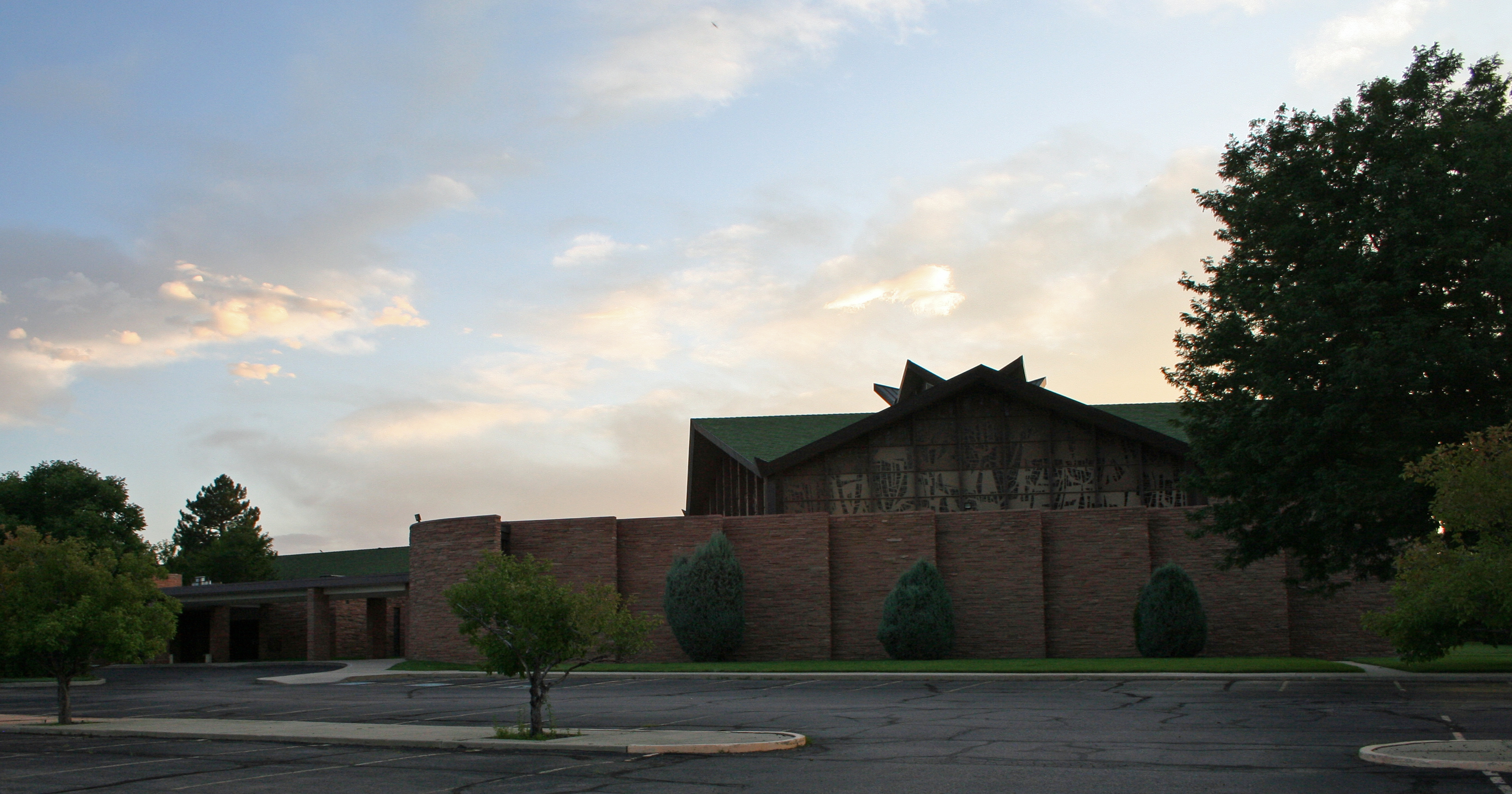
- Current Grape Street synagogue, in 2009

- Location of the current synagogue in Colorado

Religion
- Affiliation: Reform Judaism
- Ecclesiastical or organisational status: Synagogue
- Leadership: Rabbi Elizabeth Sacks (Senior Rabbi); Rabbi Emily Hyatt (Senior Rabbi); Rabbi Joshua Margo (Associate Rabbi); Steve Brodsky (Senior Cantor); Rabbi Joseph R. Black (Rabbi Emeritus)
- Status: Active

Location
- Location: 51 Grape Street, Denver, Colorado
- Country: United States
- Coordinates: 39°43′0″N 104°55′30″W

Architecture
- Architects: 1882: Frank E. Edbrooke 1898: John Humphreys; Thielman R. Wieger; 1956: Percival Goodman
- Type: Synagogue architecture
- Style: 1882: Late Victorian; Eclectic Victorian; 1898: Moorish Revival; 1956: Modernist; Usonian
- General contractor: N.G. Petry Construction (1956)
- Established: 1874 (as a congregation)
- Completed: 1882 (Curtis Street); 1898 (Pearl Street); 1956 (Grape Street)

Website
- emanueldenver.org
- Temple Emanuel Grape (1956)
- U.S. National Register of Historic Places
- Colorado State Register of Historic Properties
- NRHP reference No.: 03000403
- CSRHP No.: 5DV.144
- Added to NRHP: May 19, 2003
- Temple Emanuel Curtis (1882)
- U.S. National Register of Historic Places
- Colorado State Register of Historic Properties
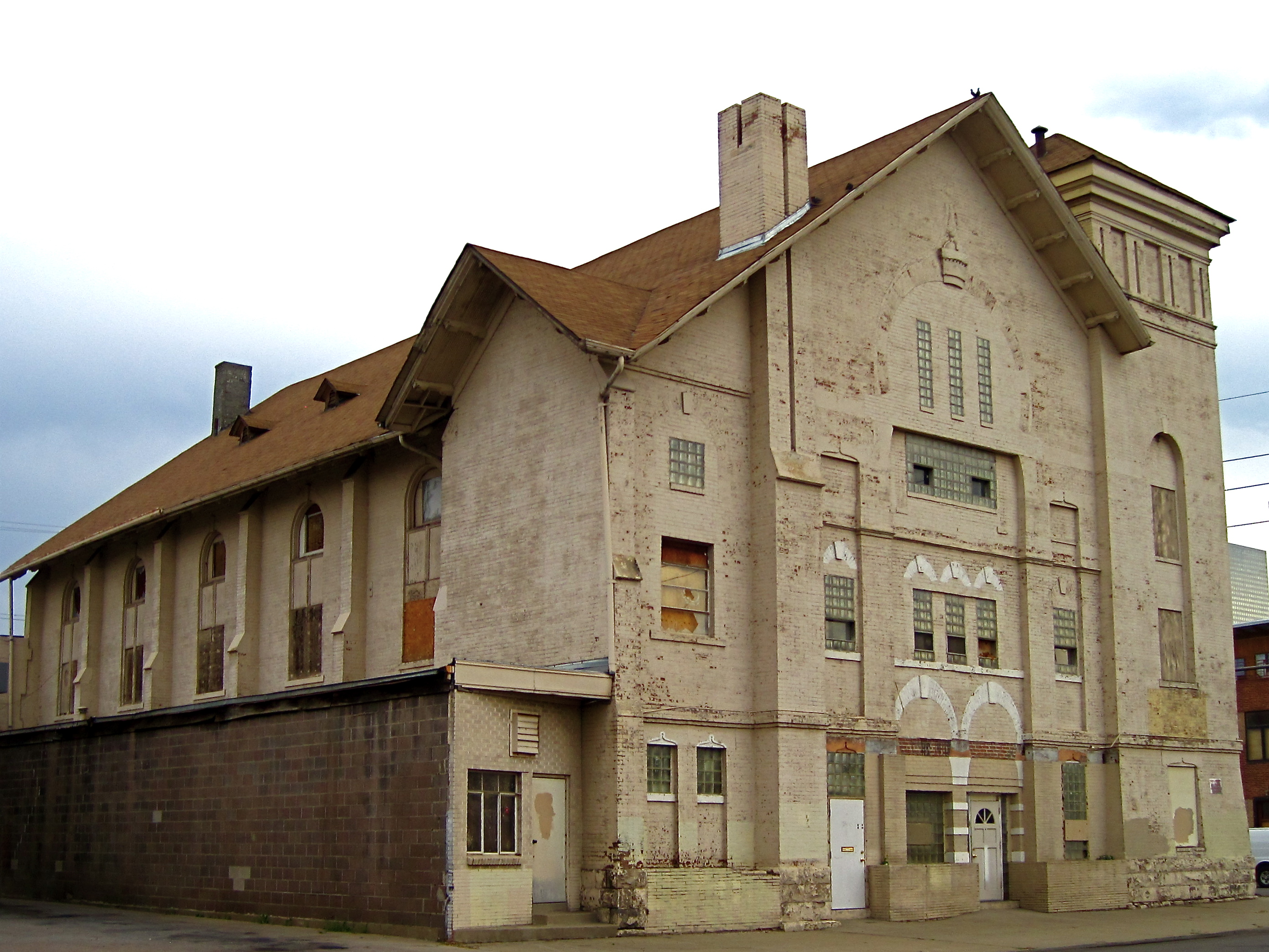
- Curtis Street former synagogue, in 2009
- Location: 24 Curtis Street
- Coordinates: 39°45′16″N 104°59′3″W
- Area: 0.2 acres (0.081 ha)
- NRHP reference No.: 78000853
- CSRHP No.: 5DV.144
- Added to NRHP: October 10, 1978
- Temple Emanuel Pearl (1898)
- U.S. National Register of Historic Places
- Colorado State Register of Historic Properties
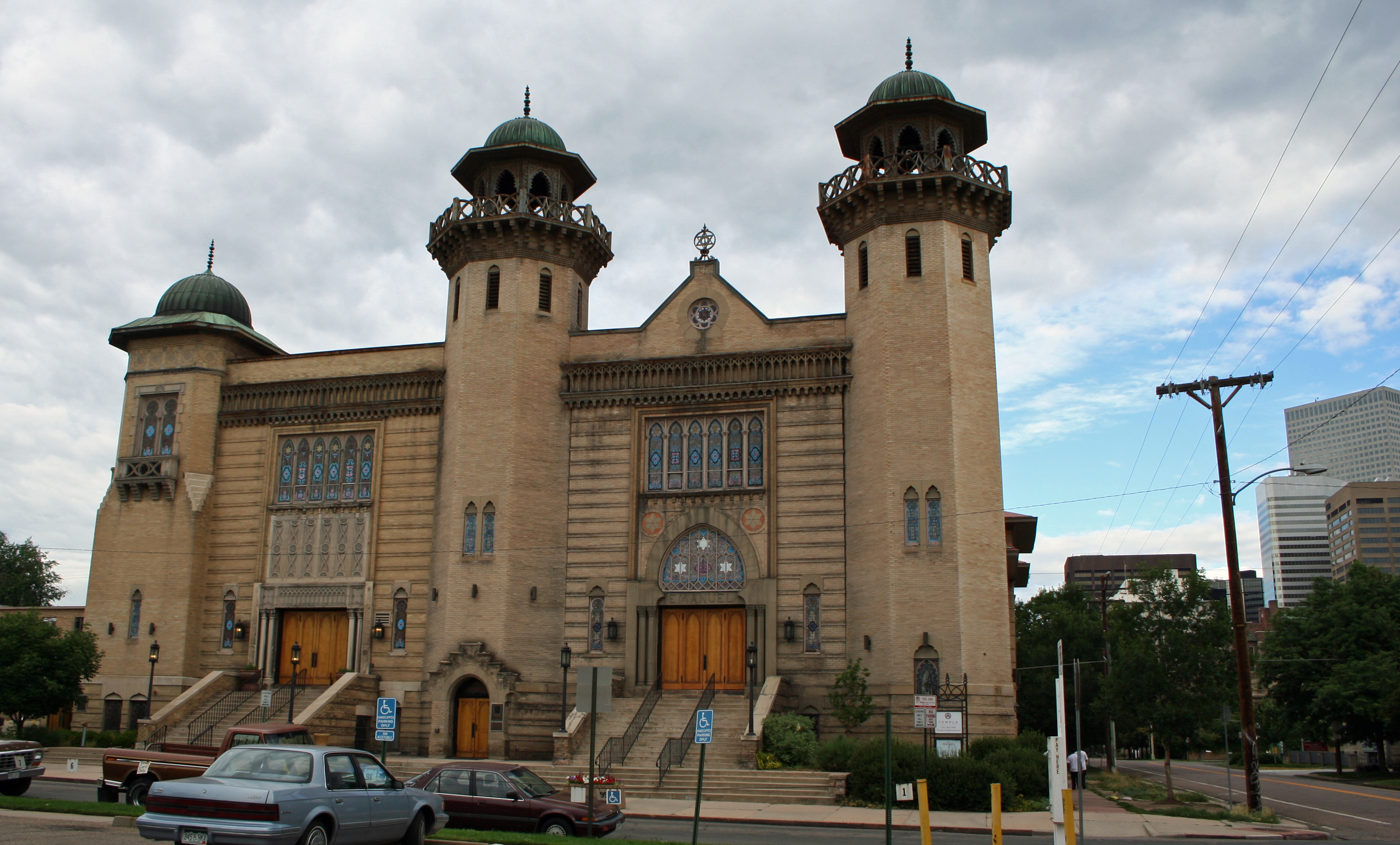
- Pearl Street former synagogue, in 2009
- Location: 1595 Pearl Street
- Coordinates: 39°44′29″N 104°58′47″W
- Area: less than one acre
- NRHP reference No.: 87001554
- CSRHP No.: 5DV.715
- Added to NRHP: November 25, 1987

The Temple Emanuel (Hebrew: עִמָנוּאֵל, lit. 'God is with us'), also known as Congregation Emanuel, is a Reform Jewish congregation and synagogue, located at 51 Grape Street, in Denver, Colorado, in the United States.

Established in 1874, it is the first synagogue in Colorado. In addition to its current synagogue building on Grape Street (1956), the congregation's former synagogue buildings, on Curtis Street (1882) and Pearl Street (1898) in Denver, are listed on the National Register of Historic Places and the Colorado State Register of Historic Properties.

== History ==
Founded in 1874 with 22 members, the congregation dedicated its first synagogue building at the corner of 19th and Curtis Streets on September 28, 1875. In 1882, Emanuel built a new facility at 24 Curtis Street. It was "the first major Jewish synagogue in the Denver area" when it was built. which was gutted by fire in 1897. The building was added to the National Register of Historic Places in 1978.

The congregation's third synagogue was built in 1898–1899 and expanded in 1924. John J. Humphreys designed the 1898 building. The 1924 building was designed by Thielman Robert Wieger. In 1957 the synagogue was sold to First Southern Baptist Church and then LovingWay Pentecostal Church in 1977. In 1986 the building was acquired by the city of Denver because of a foreclosure process. The building was listed on the National Register of Historic Places in 1987.

Its 1987 NRHP nomination states:

Temple Emanuel is the only synagogue in Denver and Colorado designed in the Eastern-Islamic Style. The use of Eastern-Islamic design for synagogues was brought to America by German Jews who had been affected by the reform movement in Judaism and anti-Semitism prevalent in 19th century Europe. Use of the design reflects the problem of retaining Jewish cultural identity while fitting into the Christian society. As a result, the style was acceptable for a place of worship but did not immediately mark it as a traditional synagogue. The Eastern-Islamic architectural mode particularly suited this purpose in addition to evoking an association with the Jewish origins in the Near East. When Temple Emanuel was built, the congregation was largely made up of German and American Jews. The building is similar to synagogues built in the eastern United States and may have been styled after those built in Cincinnati (Isaac M. Wise Temple, 1866) and in New York (Temple Emanuel, 1868 and Central Synagogue, 1872).

The temple is located in Denver's North Capitol Hill neighborhood. Pathways Church acquired the building from the City of Denver in 2005. Pathways Church held services at the building and also ran it as a separate business, the Temple Events Center, until 2013. In 2013 the building and property was sold to Denver Community Church. In 2022, the church announced its plan to move to a former basketball practice facility at 333 & 375 S. Zuni Street in Denver and to sell the Pearl Street Temple Emanuel building.

Rabbi William S. Friedman, a founder of the United Way, served as Rabbi of Temple Emanuel from 1890 to 1941.

Temple Emanuel officially celebrated its 75th anniversary on November 20, 1949, announcing at the time it was the oldest and largest synagogue between Kansas City and the West Coast.

As "Temple Emanuel", the Pearl Street building was designated a Denver Landmark in 1987.

== Present day ==
The congregation's current home, located on Grape Street in Denver's Hilltop neighborhood, was built in 1956 and added to the National Register of Historic Places in 2003.

Rabbis Emily Hyatt and Elizabeth Sacks have led the congregation since 2025. They are the first women to lead the congregation since its founding.

Previously, Rabbi Joseph R. Black served as Senior Rabbi from 2010 to 2025. He was preceded by Rabbi Steven E. Foster.

== See also ==
- History of the Jews in Denver
- Oldest synagogues in the United States
- National Register of Historic Places listings in Denver, Colorado
