= Colorado Press Association =

Non-profit association in Colorado, US

- Formation: August 8, 1878; 148 years ago
- Type: Non-profit organization
- Headquarters: Denver, Colorado
- Region served: Colorado
- Members: 350
- Website: coloradopressassociation.com

The Colorado Press Association is a non-profit association dedicated to promoting the newspaper industry in Colorado.

== History ==
The Colorado State Press Association was formed in Denver, Colorado, on August 8, 1878. In 1889, J.D. Dillenback of the Western Newspaper Association pushed the Colorado Press Association in a new direction, advocating that the CPA should work to raise the professional standards of journalism in the state. In 1920 the Colorado Press Association elected its first female president, Lois F. Allen.

== See also ==
- Denver Press Club
