= Beth HaMedrosh Hagodol-Beth Joseph =

Synagogue in Denver, Colorado

Beth HaMedrosh Hagodol – Beth Joseph
- Location in Colorado

Religion
- Affiliation: Orthodox Judaism
- Ecclesiastical or organisational status: Synagogue
- Leadership: Rabbi Yaakov Chaitovsky
- Status: Active

Location
- Location: 560 South Monaco Parkway, Denver, Colorado 80224
- Country: United States
- Coordinates: 39°42′20″N 104°54′44″W

Architecture
- Established: 1996 (merged congregation): 1897 (Beth HaMedrosh Hagodol); 1922 (Beth Joseph)
- Completed: 1969

Website
- bmh-bj.org

Beth HaMedrosh Hagodol – Beth Joseph, known locally as BMH – BJ or simply BMH, and for a period after 2012 also known as The Denver Synagogue, is an Orthodox synagogue located in Denver, Colorado, in the United States.

== History ==
=== Beth HaMedrosh Hagodol ===
Beth HaMedrosh Hagodol (BMH-the Great House of Study) originated as a modern Orthodox synagogue in 1897 under the leadership of shoe merchant Henry Plonsky. BMH rented the original Temple Emanuel building at 19th and Curits for holiday services until it purchased the former home of Temple Emanuel in 1898. The building was severely damaged by fire in 1902.

Rabbi Charles Eliezer Hillel Kauvar came to BMH in 1902 and served until 1952. BMH laid the cornerstone of their new building on Rosh Hashanah 1916 and was a major civic event, drawing DU chancellor and former Colorado governor Henry Buchtel, Judge Benjamin Barr Lindsey and former Denver School Superintendent William H. Smiley. The congregation occupied this building until 1966; after BMH left, the building served a variety of uses, falling into increasing disrepair before an extensive remodel in 2008 converted the building into a Messianic Christian church. In 1963, BMH secured 6.2 acres (25,000 m^{2}) at 560 S. Monaco Parkway and the building was completed in 1969.

The congregation was a founding member of the United Synagogue of America (now called the United Synagogue of Conservative Judaism), the primary organization of American Conservative Judaism. Rabbi Kauvar was the first vice-president of the organization, and BMH remained affiliated with the Conservative movement until 1955, when Rabbi Kauvar (by then serving as the emeritus rabbi) was influential in causing the congregation to leave the United Synagogue. BMH hired its first Orthodox rabbi in 1956. Stanley M. Wagner became the rabbi in 1972 and BMH joined the Orthodox Union, but it maintained several ritual practices not typically followed at OU-affiliates.

BMH's Monaco Parkway building was also the home of the Mizel Museum of Judaica, a museum co-founded by Denver businessman Larry Mizel, from the museum's founding in 1982 until it relocated in 2002.

=== Merged congregation ===
In 1996, BMH merged with Beth Joseph, an Orthodox congregation founded in 1922, to become Beth HaMedrosh Hagodol-Beth Joseph.

Prior to resigning its affiliation with the Orthodox Union (OU) at the end of 2015, it was the only OU affiliated synagogue in the country without a mechitza, thus allowing men and women to sit together. It was the only surviving example of a seating style that had previously been present in a substantial number of Orthodox Union affiliated synagogues, and resigned from the OU after learning the organization planned to expel them over the mixed seating issue. Today, BMH-BJ describes itself as an "independent orthodox congregation".

== See also ==
- Conservadox
