= Affiliated Computer Services =

Defunct American IT Company

Affiliated Computer Services Inc.
- Type: Subsidiary
- Traded as: NYSE: ACS
- Industry: Information Technology
- Founded: 1988; 38 years ago
- Founder: Darwin Deason
- Defunct: 2010
- Fate: acquired by Xerox Corporation
- Headquarters: Dallas, Texas, US
- Area served: Worldwide
- Key people: Darwin Deason; (chairman of the board); Lynn R. Blodgett (president, CEO & director)
- Products: Service Provider; ITO/BPO Outsourcing
- Revenue: ▲US$6.52 Billion (2009)
- Operating income: ▲US$686 Million (2009)
- Net income: ▲US$350 Million (2009)
- Total assets: ▲US$6.90 Billion (2009)
- Total equity: ▲US$2.62 Billion (2009)
- Number of employees: 74,000 (2009)
- Parent: Xerox Corporation
- Website: acs-inc.com

Affiliated Computer Services Inc. (ACS) was a company that provided information technology services as well as business process outsourcing solutions to businesses, government agencies, and non-profit organizations. ACS was based in Dallas, Texas. ACS was ranked at number 341 on the 2010 Fortune 500 list. Founded in 1988, by Darwin Deason, ACS operated in nearly 100 countries, generating over $6 billion annually. As of September 2009, ACS employed approximately 74,000 people.

On September 28, 2009, Xerox Corporation announced plans to acquire ACS in a $6.4 billion transaction. The deal closed on February 8, 2010.

== Company history ==
=== Founding and early developments ===
Affiliated Computer Services, Inc. (ACS) was founded by Darwin Deason and Charles M. Young, both former MTech Communications executives, in 1988. Deason had served as CEO at MTech and decided to launch another data processing firm after a management buyout bid of him and other executives had lost to another bid in 1988. MTech was sold to EDS for $345 million and in the same year Deason, together with a part of the MTech executive team, launched ACS. Deason was chairman and CEO while Young became president and COO.

Deason's expansion strategy was strongly reliant on acquisitions, accounting for around 70% of early growth. Two key developments were the acquisition of OBS Companies, a service provider with 200 employees and an annual revenue of $25 million, and a contract for the digitization of the Los Angeles County food stamp program.

By 1990 the company had 1,300 employees that generated revenues of more than $120 million.

Initially created as a data services provider to the financial services industry, Deason led ACS's expansion into the communications, education, financial services, government, healthcare, insurance, manufacturing, retail, and travel and transportation industries.

=== Growth as a private company ===
In 1991 ACS sought to acquire BancPlus to enter the mortgage banking business but lost to another bid. The following year, the company acquired CIC/DISC, a New York based outsourcing business.

ACS expanded beyond banking BPO services when it signed a 10-year data processing outsourcing contract with Southland Corporation (7-Eleven).

=== Public listing and continued growth ===
In 1995 ACS became a public company and divested bank data processing. By FY 1996 ACS became the fourth-largest commercial outsource provider in the U.S. More recently, ACS was best known for its Transportation Solutions Group (TSG), which supported transportation services including electronic toll collection, management of cities’ parking systems, and photo traffic enforcement.

In 2003 the company sold their government solutions business to Lockheed Martin, focusing on BPO services to commercial clients.

In 2005, ACS was offered a buyout from TPG and in 2007 from Deason and Cerberus Capital Management. Both offers were rejected.

In 2009, ACS ranked #401 on the FORTUNE 500 list and employed about 74,000 people around the world who served thousands of commercial and government clients.

In February 2010, following its acquisition by Xerox, ACS was replaced by Urban Outfitters on the Standard & Poor 500 Index.

=== Recent developments ===
On July 1, 2015, Xerox sold the IT Outsourcing business to Atos. Xerox indicated that ITO did not line up with its vision of integration of BPO (business process outsourcing) and the legacy document handling concerns. On July 29, 2016, the US District Court for the Southern District of New York dismissed the lawsuit pursued by Matthew Sciabacucchi. The lawsuit contended that some Xerox Corp directors and officers had abrogated their fiduciary duties in connection with the company's $6.4 billion acquisition of ACS in 2010.

On January 3, 2017, a company called Conduent was spun off as a divestiture from Xerox. The business scope of Conduent was generally understood to be essentially identical to that of the former Affiliated Computer Services (ACS).

In February 2020, initial efforts to demolish the company's former headquarters building in Dallas failed; the process of taking the solid concrete building apart ended up taking several days.

=== Acquisitions ===
Affiliated Computer Systems pursued a focused expansion strategy from early on. By the time it was listed on the NASDAQ, only six years after its inception, the company had already acquired 13 data processing companies. Throughout its history, ACS bought more than 50 businesses, the following is an overview of key acquisitions and joint-ventures:

- 1989: OBS Companies, an established data processing and service company
- 1992: CIC/DISC, a New York based outsourcing business
- 1994: Joint venture with Transfirst, an electronic benefits transfer (EBT) company
- 1995: Systems Group, based in Dallas and Atlanta (ACL acquired a 70% interest)
- 2005: Transportation Revenue division of Ascom

== Products and services ==
ACS began providing data processing and other information technology services to a single financial industry client, operating regionally from Dallas, and later added other banks and financial institutions to its list of clients. As information technology and business process outsourcing company, the company eventually provided services to businesses, government agencies, and non-profit organizations.

=== ATM network ===
In the 1990s, the company pioneered off-site ATMs, operated the second largest non-bank ATM network in the United States and eventually the largest in the world.

== Reception ==
=== SEC Investigation ===
In 2006, the U.S. Securities and Exchange Commission (SEC) notified ACS that they were conducting an informal investigation into certain stock option grants made by the company from October 1998 through March 2005. This was due to the improper and unethical practice of back-dating stock options to specific low points in the stock value. ACS said the executives improperly backdated the price of options grants during a period from 1994 to 2005. During that time, ACS said the executives deliberately chose days on which ACS's stock took a dip as the effective date for the options, making them more valuable when exercised. Rich, King, and Edwards "used hindsight to select favorable grant dates," ACS said in a statement. CEO Mark King and CFO Warren Edwards, both implicated in the wrongdoing, resigned immediately. The former CEO Jeff Rich previously retired at the beginning of the year.

== Literature ==
- International Directory of Company Histories, Vol.61. St. James Press, 2004.
