= Sourcing advisory =

Sourcing advisory is the use of third-party (external entity) advice during the sourcing process. As such, it may refer to advice sought during outsourcing, offshoring or global sourcing.

== Sourcing advisors ==
Given the strategic nature of the advisory and the prevalence of sourcing amongst global organizations, most management consulting firms today offer sourcing advisory services. In addition, there exist a host of specialized sourcing advisory firms that focus on providing sourcing advisory and research inputs to the industry. Sourcing advisors can also be independent freelance consultants.

In recent years software tools to automate sourcing advisory emerged. Building on Software as a Service (SaaS), the trade mark "Sourcing Advisory as a Service" (SAaaS) is used in the market.

== Services ==
The range of services provided by sourcing advisory firms include:

- Helping buyers identify functions to be outsourced or offshored (sourcing opportunity areas, shoring strategy)
- Helping buyers identify and evaluate capable suppliers (provider selection)
- Advising buyers through stages of the outsourcing transaction
- Helping buyers manage established outsourcing relationships (in issues such as governance and change management); improve sourcing contracts
- Helping buyers re-negotiate or renew transactions
- Support escalation management
- Execution of operational audits with the aim of project recovery
- Research relevant to the sourcing industry

== See also ==
- Management consulting
- Outsourcing
- Offshoring
- Global sourcing
