= Low-cost country sourcing =

Procurement strategy

Low-cost country sourcing (LCCS) is a procurement strategy in which a company sources materials from countries with lower labour and production costs in order to cut operating expenses. LCCS falls under a broad category of procurement efforts called global sourcing.

The process of low-cost sourcing consists of two parties. The customer and the supplier countries like US, UK, Canada, Japan, Australia, and West European nations are considered as high-cost countries (HCC) whereas resource rich and regulated wage labor locations like China, India, Indonesia, Bolivia, Brazil, Russia, Mexico, and East European nations are considered low-cost countries (LCC). In low-cost-country sourcing the material (products) flows from LCC to HCC while the technology flows from HCC to LCC.

The primary principle behind LCCS is to obtain sourcing efficiencies through identifying and exploiting opportunities of price reduction between geographies.

Aside from price other reasons for engaging in global sourcing can include improved manufacturing capacity/ time frames, quality of goods, improved customer services and logistics benefits.

== Destination ==
Not necessarily all "low cost countries" are destinations for LCCS. Only those countries with relatively stable political and economic environment, modern infrastructure and acceptably compatible legal system are considered to be ideal for sourcing. Examples and most popular regions are China, Indonesia, Thailand, Vietnam, Malaysia, Ethiopia, India, Ukraine, Romania, Bulgaria, Albania, Mexico, Bolivia, Cambodia, Hungary and Czech Republic.

== Labour costs ==
Labour costs have been rising across Asia as Asians now are more willing to pay a premium for the products and services they receive and thus causing production costs to increase. Many countries in Asia have seen a rapid rise in wages since the late 2000s. One factor contributing to the wage rises is due to the shift of labour from agricultural work into more productive jobs in industry, labour productivity has increased quickly thus leading to wage growth. Workers will demand for better wages as Singapore's economic growth and living costs are gradually increasing. Businesses will thus face pressure on their profit margins as rising labour costs leads to higher production costs.

Labour costs in China and India have been increasing over the years. China was initially one of the lowest labour cost countries known. However, due to the rising demands of people and the increase in the cost of goods, China is no longer regarded as the ‘cheapest’ country to manufacture goods anymore. China is now deemed as less competitive compared to other countries. The increased labour costs have resulted in some foreign firms exiting the country, in search of countries where labour cost is cheaper, like Thailand and Philippines. Other countries apart from China are beginning to provide raw materials at a lower cost, leaving manufacturers with more choices as regards their suppliers.

A 2012 Ernst & Young report says that "Wages have been pushed up by long-term decline in the aggregate labor force, combined with a rapid depletion in rural surplus labor, which has until recently provided an ultimate source of cheap labor,". But it warned that the massive reallocation of labor "from low productivity agriculture to higher productivity manufacturing is coming to an end". Even before the Chinese economy started to turn down, there were concerns that it was facing a middle income trap, widely identified by economists as showing the danger of a Lewis Turning Point, a phenomenon observed in history of Japan, which showed that rapid urbanization led to a growth in manufacturing. However, eventually, the phenomenon comes to an end as wages rise and the country's competitive edge disappears. The number of migrant workers in China has been increasing at a slower pace since 2005. Although there are 320 million laborers still in agriculture, only 20 million have the potential to migrate to cities, pushing the country to a point at which "the excess labor in the subsistence sector is fully absorbed into the modern sector, and where further capital accumulation begins to increase wages" - pointing to a Lewis scenario.

=== Situation in China ===
Labor shortage is not yet a major problem in China, as there are still governmental measures to free up the pool of rural labor, such as the further easing of the hukou, or household registration, system. “However, these are unlikely to reverse the trend of increasing labor costs". They will continue to rise as minimum wages and social welfare improve, adding that on top of the 13 percent annual increase in the minimum wage as set in the 12th Five-Year Plan (2011–15), mandatory social welfare will add another 35 to 40 percent to the payroll cost.

Because there is a large supply of workers, especially in rural sector, wage growth for unskilled labor will grow slowly. At the same time, “wage growth for skilled labor will also likely taper off because of the convergence of college wage premiums to international standards in recent years and the anticipated robust supply of university graduates and professionals returning from overseas”. Therefore, overall wage will slowly grow in the near future.

"Rising wages are most significant to primary producers and services industries, as labor takes the major share of total costs in these sectors,". Apart from labor, capital - still relatively cheap in China - will also become more expensive as policymakers move the country toward interest rate liberalization. Material costs, too, will continue to rise and will reach global levels. As the economy slows down, it becomes harder and harder for companies to pass on the costs to customers. China's rising labor costs will help other South Asian countries gain a foothold in low-end manufacturing.

== See also ==
- Global labor arbitrage
- Global sourcing
- International trade
- Offshore company
- Offshore outsourcing
- Offshore software R&D
- Offshoring
- Resource curse
