= Global sourcing =

Sourcing from the global market for goods and services across geopolitical boundaries

Global sourcing is the practice of sourcing from the global market for goods and services across geopolitical boundaries. Global sourcing often aims to exploit global efficiencies in the delivery of a product or service. These efficiencies include low cost skilled labor, low cost raw material, extreme international competition, new technology and other economic factors like tax breaks and low trade tariffs. Common examples of globally sourced products or services include labor-intensive manufactured products produced using low-cost Chinese labor, call centers staffed with low-cost English speaking workers in the Philippines, India and Pakistan, and IT work performed by low-cost programmers in India, Pakistan and Eastern Europe. While these are examples of low-cost country sourcing, global sourcing is not limited to low-cost countries.

Global sourcing initiatives and programs form an integral part of the strategic sourcing plans and procurement strategies of many multinational companies. Global sourcing is often associated with a centralized procurement strategy for a multinational, wherein a central buying organization seeks economies of scale through corporate-wide standardization and benchmarking. A definition focused on this aspect of global sourcing is: "proactively integrating and coordinating common items and materials, processes, designs, technologies, and suppliers across worldwide purchasing, engineering, and operating locations (p. 304)".

The global sourcing of goods and services has advantages and disadvantages that can go beyond low cost. Some advantages of global sourcing beyond low cost include: learning how to do business in a potential market, tapping into skills or resources unavailable domestically, developing alternate supplier/vendor sources to stimulate competition, and increasing total supply capacity. Some key disadvantages of global sourcing can include: hidden costs associated with different cultures and time zones, exposure to financial and political risks in countries with (often) emerging economies, increased risk of the loss of intellectual property, and increased monitoring costs relative to domestic supply. For manufactured goods, some key disadvantages include long lead times, the risk of port shutdowns interrupting supply, and the difficulty of monitoring product quality. (With regard to quality in the food industry, see Roth et al. (2008).).

International procurement organizations (or IPOs) may be an element of the global sourcing strategy for a firm. These procurement organizations take primary responsibility for identifying and developing key suppliers across sourcing categories and help satisfy periodic sourcing requirements of the parent organization. Such setups help provide focus in country-based sourcing efforts. Particularly in the case of large and complex countries, such as China, where a range of sub-markets exist and suppliers span the entire value chain of a product/commodity, such IPOs provide essential on-the-ground information. While most IPOs limited to a country or a region, there are IPOs that provide multi-country support in providing comprehensive global sourcing capabilities such as Li & Fung and Jusda.

Over time, these IPOs may grow up to be complete procurement organizations in their own right, with fully engaged category experts and quality assurance teams. It is therefore important for firms to clearly define an integration and scale-up plan for the IPO.

== See also ==
- Domestic sourcing – Buying locally made goods or services
- Low-cost country sourcing – Procurement strategy
- Offshore company – Company or corporate entity established in an offshore jurisdiction
- Offshore outsourcing – Contracting internal tasks to an external organization
- Offshore software R&D
- Offshoring Research Network
- Offshoring – Transnational relocation of operations
- Outsourcing – Contracting internal tasks to an external organization
- Sourcing advisory
- Strategic sourcing – Developing channels of supply at the lowest total cost
