= Global information system =

Global information system is an information system which is developed and / or used in a global context. Some examples of GIS are SAP, The Global Learning Objects Brokered Exchange and other systems.

== Definition ==
There are a variety of definitions and understandings of a global information system (GIS, GLIS), such as

- A global information system (GIS) is an information system which is developed and / or used in a global context.
- A global information system (GIS) is any information system which attempts to deliver the totality of measurable data worldwide within a defined context.

Common to this class of information systems is that the context is a global setting, either for its use or development process. This means that it highly relates to distributed systems / distributed computing where the distribution is global. The term also incorporates aspects of global software development and there outsourcing (when the outsourcing locations are globally distributed) and offshoring aspects. A specific aspect of global information systems is the case (domain) of global software development. A main research aspect in this field concerns the coordination of and collaboration between virtual teams. Further important aspects are the internationalization and language localization of system components.

== Tasks in designing global information systems ==
Critical tasks in designing global information systems are

- Process and system design: How are the processes between distributed actors organized, how are the systems distributed / integrated.
- Technical architecture: What is the technical infrastructure enabling actors to collaborate?
- Support mechanisms: How are actors in the process of communication, collaboration, and cooperation supported?

A variety of examples can be given. Basically every multi-lingual website can be seen as a global information system. However, mostly the term GLIS is used to refer to a specific system developed or used in a global context.

== Examples ==
Specific examples are

- Systems developed for multinational users, e.g., SAP as a global ERP system
- Global Information Systems for Education: The Global Learning Objects Brokered Exchange
- For the specific case of data integration : http://data.un.org, https://web.archive.org/web/20190825060649/http://www.internettrafficreport.com/, http://www.unhcr.org/statistics.html

== More information / courses ==
- Global Information Systems at the University of Jyväskylä
- Resources on Global Information Technology at AIS World
