= Restructuring (disambiguation) =

Restructuring is the act of reorganizing business structures.

Restructuring may also refer to:

- Debt restructuring, the reduction and renegotiation of debt
- Economic restructuring, the phenomenon of urban areas shifting their economic base from manufacturing to the service sector
- Cognitive restructuring, a process in cognitive therapy with the goal of replacing irrational beliefs with more accurate and beneficial ones
- Physical restructuring, the transfer, consolidation and closure activities of manufacturing plants

== See also ==
- Structuring
- Reconstruction
- Renegotiation
