= Contract manufacturer =

Company that manufactures items for other companies

A contract manufacturer (CM) produces goods under contract for an outsourcing company under the label or brand name of that company. If the good is a complete product, rather than product component(s), the CM may be termed a turnkey supplier. A contract manufacturer performing packaging operations is called copacker or a contract packager. Brand name companies focus on product innovation, design and sales, while the manufacturing takes place in independent factories (the turnkey suppliers).

Most turnkey suppliers specialize in simply manufacturing physical products, but some are also able to handle a significant part of the design and customization process if needed. Some turnkey suppliers specialize in one base component (e.g. memory chips) or a base process (e.g. plastic molding).

== Business model ==
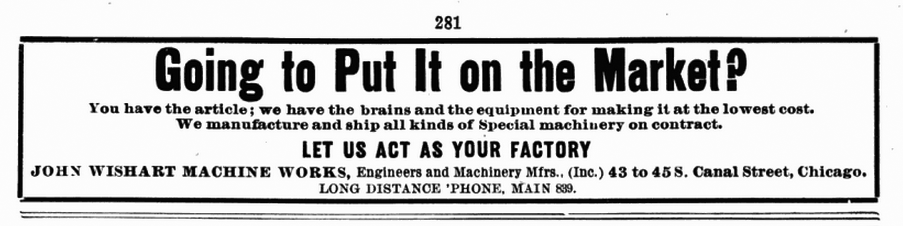
An advertisement for contract manufacturing services, in Popular Mechanics, 1905

In a contract manufacturing business model, the hiring firm approaches the contract manufacturer with a design or formula. The contract manufacturer will quote the parts based on processes, labor, tooling, and material costs. Typically a hiring firm will request quotes from multiple CMs. After the bidding process is complete, the hiring firm will select a source, and then, for the agreed-upon price, the CM acts as the hiring firm's factory, producing and shipping units of the design on behalf of the hiring firm.

Job production is, in essence, manufacturing on a contract basis, and thus it forms a subset of the larger field of contract manufacturing. But the latter field also includes, in addition to jobbing, a higher level of outsourcing in which a product-line-owning company entrusts its entire production to a contractor, rather than just outsourcing parts of it.

== Industries that use the practice ==
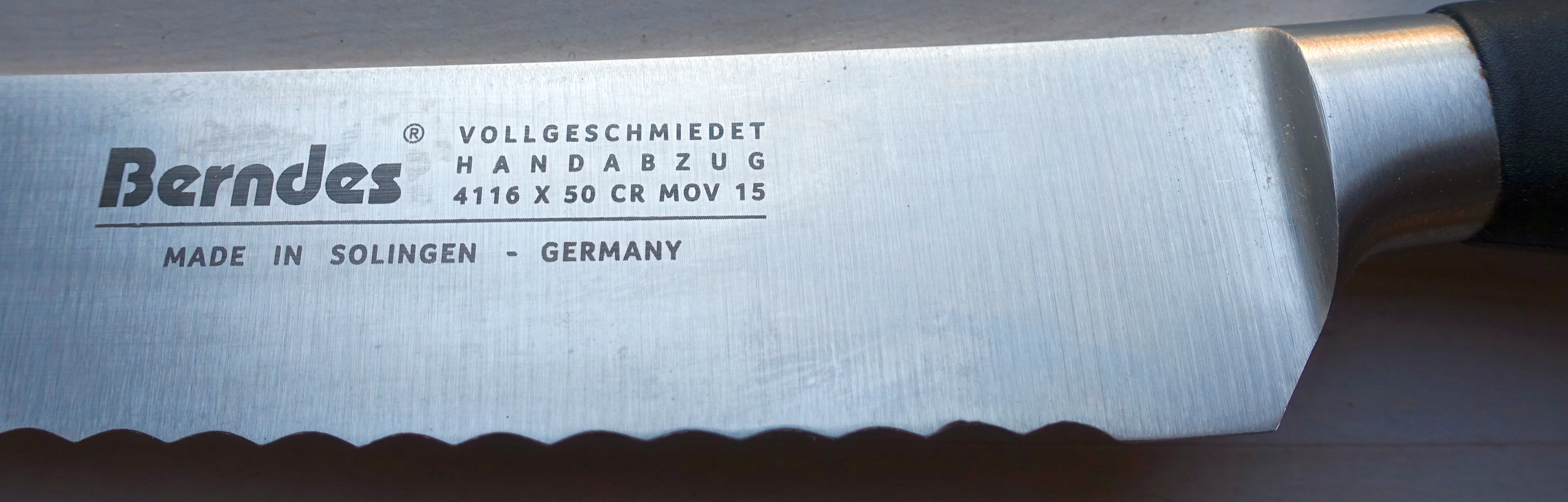
A contract manufacturer produced this knife with a protected geographical indication for a brand outside Solingen that usually sells cookware.

Many industries use this process, especially the aerospace, defense, computer, semiconductor, energy, medical, food manufacturing, personal care, packaging, and automotive fields. Some types of contract manufacturing include CNC machining, complex assembly, aluminum die casting, grinding, broaching, gears, and forging. The pharmaceutical industry uses this process with CMs called contract manufacturing organizations, constituting a $14 billion business segment around 2022. In the semiconductor industry, this practice is called the foundry model. Contract manufacturing is specially prevalent in the electronics industry.

== Purpose, benefits, and risks ==
There are many benefits as well as risks to contract manufacturing. Companies are finding many reasons why they should outsource their production to other companies. However, production outside of the company has many risks attached. Companies must first identify their core competencies before deciding about contract manufacturers. A company's competencies are what make them competitive in the marketplace. If a company allows another company to take control of them, it loses that advantage.

When deciding about contract manufacture, the company should weigh the benefits and associated risks. For small companies, contract manufacturing may not be a good business strategy. For large companies that are trying to extend into new markets, contract manufacturing may be a good choice.

=== Benefits ===
- Cost savings – Companies save on their cost of capital because they do not have to pay for a facility and the equipment needed for production. They can also save on labor costs such as wages, training and benefits. Some companies may look to contract manufacture in low-cost countries, such as India, to benefit from the low cost of labor.
- Mutual benefit to contract site – A contract between the manufacturer and the company it’s producing for may last several years. The manufacturer will know that it will have a steady flow of business until then.
- Advanced skills – Companies can take advantage of skills that they may not possess, but the contract manufacturer does. The contract manufacturer is likely to have relationships formed with raw material suppliers or methods of efficiency within their production.
- Quality – Contract manufacturers are likely to have their own methods of quality control in place that helps them to detect counterfeit or damaged materials early.
- Focus – Companies can focus on their core competencies better if they can hand off base production to an outside company.
- Economies of scale – Contract manufacturers have multiple customers that they produce for. Because they are servicing multiple customers, they can offer reduced costs in acquiring raw materials by benefiting from economies of scale. The more units there are in one shipment, the less expensive the price per unit will be.

=== Risks ===
- Lack of control – When a company signs the contract allowing another company to produce their product, they lose a significant amount of control over that product. They can only suggest strategies to the contract manufacturer; they cannot force them to implement them.
- Relationships – It is imperative that the company forms a good relationship with its contract manufacturer. The company must keep in mind that the manufacturer has other customers. They cannot force them to produce their product before a competitor’s. Most companies mitigate this risk by working cohesively with the manufacturer and awarding good performance with additional business.
- Quality concerns – When entering into a contract, companies must make sure that the manufacturer’s standards are congruent with their own. They should evaluate the methods in which they test products to make sure they are of good quality. The company has to rely on the contract manufacturer for having good suppliers that also meet these standards.
- Intellectual property loss – When entering into a contract, a company is divulging their formulas or technologies. This is why it is important that a company not give out any of its core competencies to contract manufacturers. It is very easy for an employee to download such information from a computer and steal it.
- Outsourcing risks – Although outsourcing to low-cost countries has become very popular, it does bring along risks such as language barriers, cultural differences and long lead times. This could make the management of contract manufacturers more difficult, expensive and time-consuming.
- Capacity constraints – If a company does not make up a large portion of the contract manufacturer’s business, they may find that they are de-prioritized over other companies during high production periods. Thus, they may not obtain the product they need when they need it.
- Loss of flexibility and responsiveness – Without direct control over the manufacturing facility, the company will lose some of its ability to respond to disruptions in the supply chain. It may also hurt their ability to respond to demand fluctuations, risking their customer service levels.
- Pricing – This addition of a second company and second profit margin to be achieved, adds in cost to the product. The impact is seen either in a higher selling price to the customer or in a reduced profit margin for the company.

== Protectionism ==
In an international context, establishing a foreign subsidiary as a contract manufacturer can have favorable tax benefits for the parent company, allowing them to reduce overall tax liabilities and increase profits, depending upon the activities of the contract manufacturer. This is a form of true protectionism.

The iPad and iPhone, which are products of Apple Inc., are manufactured in China by Foxconn. Hence, Foxconn is a contract manufacturer, and Apple benefits from a lower cost of manufacturing devices. Some devices may also be manufactured by Pegatron. Apple explored moving some fraction of iPhone assembly into the United States.

== See also ==
- Bill of materials (BOM)
- Contract manufacturing organization (CMO)
- Electronics manufacturing services (EMS) or electronics contract manufacturing (ECM)
- Original design manufacturer (ODM)
- Original equipment manufacturer (OEM)
- Private label or parts list (PL)
- Subcontractor
- Supplier evaluation
- Turnkey
