= Non-China supply chain =

Geopolitical business strategy

Non-China supply chain, also known as Non-red supply chain, is the geopolitical business strategy of completely avoiding investing in China and diversifying businesses into other developing countries, such as India, Vietnam, Indonesia, Malaysia, Mexico, Thailand, Philippines, Brunei and Bangladesh in order to reduce vulnerability caused by supply chain over-reliance.

The concept is often viewed as similar but more of an extension to the China Plus One policy. It began to draw public attention in 2020 when companies with supply chains that were too concentrated in China were significantly disrupted by the country's strict policies to contain the COVID-19 pandemic. For example, numerous Indian companies began to adopt strategies to find alternative supply chains following the COVID-19 pandemic.

In Taiwan, the term gradually entered the public view in the early 2020s, particularly in policy debates discussing strengthening cooperation with partners in North America and the Indo-Pacific, coupled with the New Southbound Policy. The term also became more frequently mentioned by some of its international partners (such as Japan and the United States), especially in strategically important industries like semiconductors and electronics, ICT, military and drones.

Since then, the Taiwanese government became stricter in requiring that the supply chains of the public sector, military and other key technology industries, to meet the "pure outsourcing" or localization standard of "zero Chinese investment background, zero Chinese-made components". According to the Taiwan News, Canada has also recently started to reduce the use of drones produced in China due to national security concerns.

According to a report by the Taipei Times in May 2026, the Trump administration has begun to actively promote a "de-Chinafy" supply chain policy. This policy is similar in many ways to Taiwan's "non-China supply chain" policy, which aims to reduce dependence on China for key technologies and materials.

Apart from key industries, the raw materials supply chain has also recently begun to draw the attention of countries like Australia, Mexico and India. Chinese suppliers have been dominating the supply chain of rare earth elements such as dysprosium and tungsten for many decades as well as raw materials for battery parts and some pharmaceuticals. By adopting strategies like the "non-China supply chain", businesses can help to prevent risks of sudden supply disruption. For example, China suspended rare earth exports to Japan in 2010 for two months.

However, as some experts pointed out, the non-China supply chain strategy comes with its own share of difficulties. This includes navigating new laws, new markets, and streamlining the business over multiple locations. Furthermore, replacing an existing supplier is both costly and time-consuming.。

== See also ==
- Friendshoring
- China Plus One
- Supply chain resilience
- China–United States trade war
- Political colour
