= Darwin Deason =

American businessman (1940–2025)

- Born: Darwin Albert Deason; May 18, 1940; Rogers, Arkansas, U.S.
- Died: December 2, 2025 (aged 85)
- Occupation: Businessman
- Spouse(s): 4 earlier wives Katerina Panos (m. 2008; div. 2019) Kimberly Cohn (m. 2020; div. 2023)
- Children: 3

Darwin Albert Deason (May 18, 1940 – December 2, 2025) was an American billionaire businessman and political donor. He founded Affiliated Computer Services in 1988, and sold it to Xerox for $6.4 billion in 2010, eventually becoming Xerox's largest individual shareholder (c.12%, as of 2023).

At the time of his death, Forbes estimated his net worth at US$1.3 billion.

== Early life and career ==
Deason grew up on a farm near Rogers, Arkansas. He moved to Tulsa, Oklahoma, after graduating from high school and got a job at Gulf Oil. Deason then worked for a data processing company, and eventually took control of a struggling subsidiary of a Dallas company that he spun out from MBank and renamed MTech. While trying to take MTech private, it was purchased by EDS.

After selling MTech to EDS, Deason founded Affiliated Computer Services (ACS) in 1988. ACS became one of the first companies to outsource office work to places outside of the United States. The company went public in 1994. Deason retired as CEO of the company in 1999, but remained executive chairman until its sale to Xerox in 2010.

In 2007, Deason attempted to buy control of ACS with the help of Cerberus Capital Management, but the deal collapsed due to board disagreements, and members of the ACS board resigned in protest. Deason used the opportunity to reconstitute the company's board. In 2009, Deason negotiated a deal to sell ACS to Xerox. Due to a negotiated additional premium/the value placed on his voting stock, shareholders sued Deason. The suit was settled, and the sale closed in early 2010.

In October 2016, Deason sued Xerox to block a restructuring plan that would eventually see his company spun out of Xerox, arguing the deal would misallocate his ownership between Xerox and its spin off, later named Conduent, and the transaction would have resulting in a poor allocation of debt between the Xerox' investment-grade business and Conduent. Xerox had just announced its plan to split its operations into is core copier and printers related businesses (Xerox), and the business process outsourcing business (Conduent Inc). By the end of October 2016, the suit was settled and Deason's preferred shares were split between the companies (180,000 shares of Xerox's preferred stock and 120,000 preferred shares of Conduent).

== Political activity ==
Deason's family are major financial backers of the Republican Party. They donated $250,000 to support Rick Perry's 2012 presidential candidacy.

In the 2016 presidential election, Deason again supported Perry, donating $5 million to his campaign. After Perry withdrew from the race in September 2015, Deason asked for his contribution to be returned. Deason then endorsed Ted Cruz's campaign.

Between 2017 and June 30, 2019, Deason donated $1 million to the America First Policies-tied America First Action super PAC. Deason later contributed $405,000 to Donald Trump's 2020 presidential campaign.

== Personal life and death ==
Deason was married six times, and his fifth wife, Katerina Panos, was 27 years his junior. In 2012, Forbes described him as "a former alcoholic". They divorced in 2019, and the following year, Katerina married Richard Rawlings, a businessman and media personality.

In 2020, Darwin married Kimberly Cohn, and they filed for divorce in 2023.

Deason died on December 2, 2025, at the age of 85.
