= Offshoring =

Transnational relocation of operations

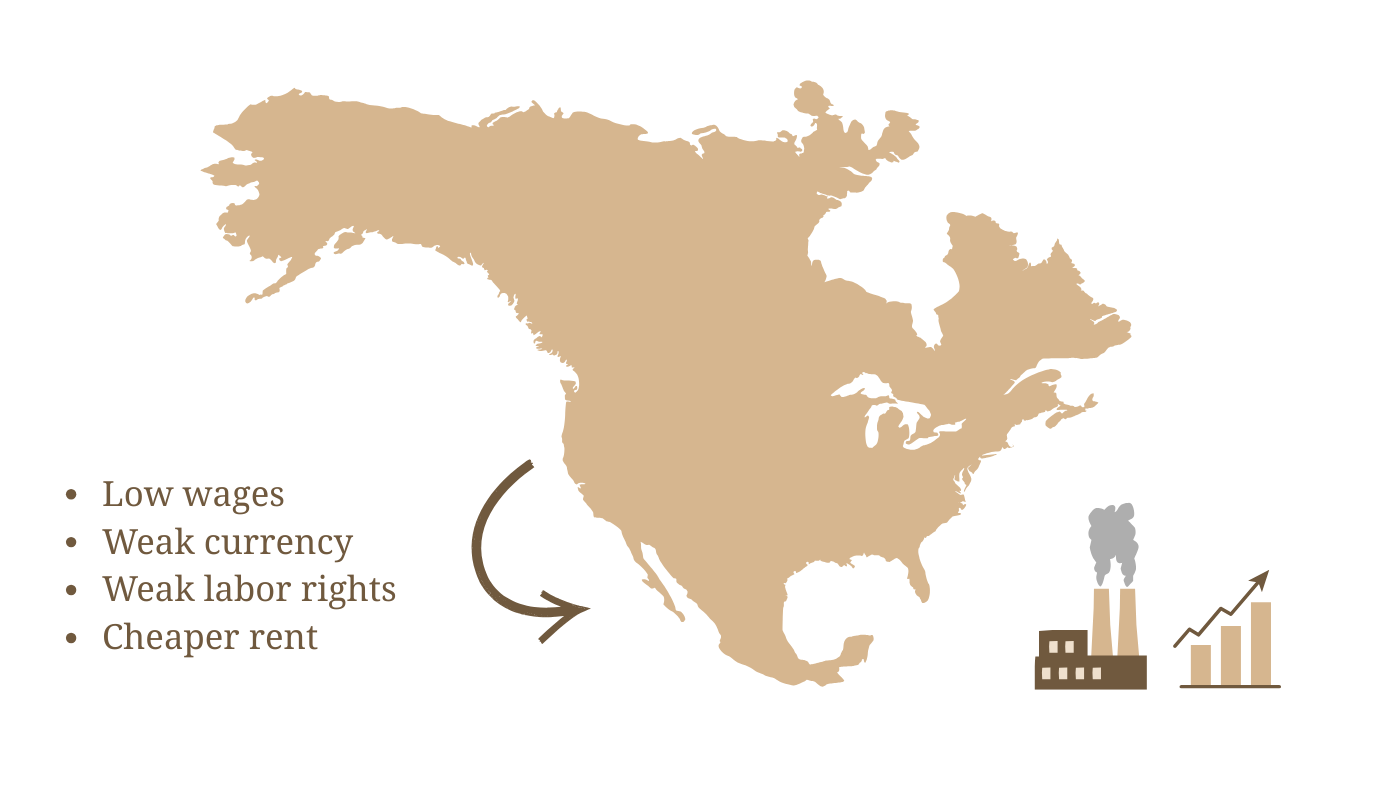
Relocation of factories, known as physical restructuring, often occurs as a result of free trade policies between high-wage and low-wage countries.

Offshoring is the relocation of a business process from one country to another—typically an operational process, such as manufacturing, or supporting processes, such as accounting. Usually this refers to a company business, although state governments may also employ offshoring. More recently, technical and administrative services have been offshored.

Offshoring neither implies nor precludes involving a different company to be responsible for a business process. Therefore, offshoring should not be confused with outsourcing which does imply one company relying on another. In practice, the concepts can be intertwined, i.e. offshore outsourcing, and can be individually or jointly, partially or completely reversed, as described by terms such as reshoring, inshoring, and insourcing. In-house offshoring is when the offshored work is done by means of an internal (captive) delivery model. Imported services from subsidiaries or other closely related suppliers are included, whereas intermediate goods, such as partially completed cars or computers, may not be.

== Motivation ==
Lower cost and increased profitability are often the motivation for offshoring. Economists call this labor arbitrage. More recently, offshoring incentives also include access to qualified personnel abroad, in particular in technical professions, and decreasing the time to market.

From 2018 to 2023, many firms reacted to tariff escalation, geopolitical frictions and industrial policy shifts by diversifying production across multiple countries ("China-plus-many") rather than exiting a country entirely, with Vietnam, India, Mexico, Thailand, Taiwan and the United States among the most frequent destinations. Companies typically cited several overlapping drivers per move—most commonly geopolitical risk and trade-war tariffs, alongside rising costs and the desire to reduce dependence on a single country—indicating multi-causal decision-making rather than a single trigger. Firms often first shifted volumes to already-known suppliers to maintain continuity, then added new sites to build redundancy as conditions stabilized.

Jobs are added in the destination country providing the goods or services and are subtracted from the higher-cost labor country. The increased safety net costs of the unemployed may be absorbed by the government (taxpayers) in the high-cost country or by the company doing the offshoring. Europe experienced less offshoring than the United States due to policies that applied more costs to corporations and cultural barriers.

=== Criteria ===
Some criteria for a job to be offshore-able are:

- There is a significant wage difference between the original and offshore countries
- Remote work is possible in the job
- The work can be transmitted over the Internet
- The work is repeatable

Additional feasibility considerations observed in 2018–2023 included the availability of multi-country supplier portfolios and destination-country policy incentives that enable staged capacity transfers without disrupting continuity.

== Variations ==
=== Offshore outsourcing ===
Subcontracting in the same country would be outsourcing, but not offshoring. A company moving an internal business unit from one country to another would be offshoring or physical restructuring, but not outsourcing. A company subcontracting a business unit to a different company in another country would be both outsourcing and offshoring, offshore outsourcing. Offshoring as a service (OaaS) is a business model in which the offshore office is outsourcing to a vendor. The OaaS model leans towards utilizing a team or company which specializes in offshoring work and uses them on a contractual basis as a part of their own team.

Types of offshore outsourcing include:

- Information technology outsourcing (ITO) is where outsourcing is related to technology or the internet, such as computer programming.
- Business process outsourcing (BPO) involves contracting out operational functions to a third-party service provider.
- Offshore Software development
- Knowledge Process Outsourcing (KPO) is a type of outsourcing that involves or requires more advanced technical skills and a higher level of expertise.
- Customer Support Outsourcing (CSO) involves delegating customer service functions to offshore call centres or service providers to handle inquiries, complaints, and assistance.
- Recruitment Process Outsourcing (RPO) is a workforce solution in which a business transfers all or part of its recruitment to an external provider. Businesses can deliver a standalone service or the entire operations.

Empirical evidence shows that multi-country ("portfolio") configurations have become more common in manufacturing relocations since 2018; only about one-third of observed moves involved a single destination, with many firms splitting volumes across two to six countries to hedge risk.

=== Nearshoring ===
Nearshoring is a form of offshoring in which the other country is relatively close such as one sharing a border. Being nearby results in potentially beneficial commonalities such as temporal (time zone), cultural, social, linguistic, economic, political, or historical linkages. According to the 1913 New York Times article "Near Source of Supplies the Best Policy", the main focus was then on "cost of production." Although transportation cost was addressed, they did not choose among:

- transporting supplies to place of production
- transporting finished goods to place(s) of sale
- cost and availability of labor

The term nearshoring derives from offshoring. When combined with outsourcing, nearshore outsourcing, the nearshore workers are not employees of the company for which the work is performed. Nearshoring can involve business strategy to locate operations close to where product is sold. This is contrasted with using low-wage manufacturing operations in developing nations and shipping product back to the country that offshored the work. With nearshore outsourcing, the work is done by an outside company rather than internally, but in contrast to typical offshore outsourcing, the work is done in fairly close proximity to the company headquarters and its target market. Nearshoring is often used for information technology (IT) processes such as application development, maintenance and testing.

In Europe, nearshore outsourcing relationships are between clients in larger European economies and various providers in smaller European nations. The attraction is lower-cost skilled labor forces, and a less stringent regulatory environment, but crucially they allow for more day to day physical oversight. These countries also have strong cultural ties to the major economic centers in Europe as they are part of EU. For example, as of 2020 Portugal is considered to be the most trending outsourcing destination as big companies like Mercedes, Google, Jaguar, Sky News, Natixis and BNP Paribas opening development centers in Lisbon and Porto, where labor costs are lower, talent comes from excellent Universities, there's availability of skills and the time zone is GMT (the same as London). US clients nearshore to countries such as Canada, Mexico and nations in Central and South America.

==== Reasons to nearshore ====
===== Culture =====
Cultural alignment with the business is often more readily achieved through near-sourcing due to there being similarities between the cultures in which the business is located and in which services are sub-contracted, including for example proficiency with the language used in that culture.

===== Communication =====
Constraints imposed by time zones can complicate communication; near-sourcing or nearshoring offers a solution. English language skills are the cornerstone of Nearshore and IT services. Collaboration by universities, industry, and government has slowly produced improvements. Proximity also facilitates in-person interaction regularly and/or when required.

===== Other advantages =====
Software development nearshoring is mainly due to flexibility when it comes to upscale or downscale teams or availability of low cost skilled developers. The nearshoring of call centers, shared services centers, and business process outsourcing (BPO) rose as offshore outsourcing was seen to be relatively less valuable. More recently, companies have explored nearshoring as a risk mitigation strategy for operational and supply chain weaknesses uncovered during the COVID-19 global pandemic crisis, when offshore BPOs experienced sudden closures and disruptive quarantine restrictions which hampered their ability to conduct day-to-day business operations.

The complexities of offshoring stem from language and cultural differences, travel distances, workday/time zone mismatches, and greater effort for needed for establishing trust and long-term relationships. Many nearshore providers attempted to circumvent communication and project management barriers by developing new ways to align organizations. As a result, concepts such as remote insourcing were created to give clients more control in managing their own projects. Nearshoring still has not overcome all barriers, but proximity allows more flexibility to align organizations.

=== Production offshoring ===
Production offshoring, also known as physical restructuring, of established products involves relocation of physical manufacturing processes overseas, usually to a lower-cost destination or one with fewer regulatory restrictions. Physical restructuring arrived when the North American Free Trade Agreement (NAFTA) made it easier for manufacturers to shift production facilities from the US to Mexico.

This trend later shifted to China, which offered cheap prices through very low wage rates, few workers' rights laws, a fixed currency pegged to the US dollar, (currently fixed to a basket of economies) cheap loans, cheap land, and factories for new companies, few environmental regulations, and huge economies of scale based on cities with populations over a million workers dedicated to producing a single kind of product. However, many companies are reluctant to move high value-added production of leading-edge products to China because of lax enforcement of intellectual property laws.

Since 2018, labor-intensive sectors such as footwear and textiles were often the earliest to relocate part of their output from China to established hubs (notably Vietnam), while capital-intensive industries like electronics and automotive tended to move more slowly and in stages as local supplier ecosystems were developed. Across destinations, firms combined moves to existing plants (for speed) with greenfield investments (for longer-term transformation), with Vietnam, India, Mexico, Thailand and Taiwan among the principal recipients of capacity. Entry strategies also differed: when entering a country for the first time, companies more frequently chose direct (in-house) manufacturing, whereas relocations to countries with existing relationships more often used contract manufacturing to retain flexibility.

=== IT-enabled services offshoring ===
Growth of offshoring has been linked to the availability of reliable and affordable communication infrastructure following the telecommunication and internet expansion of the late 1990s. Much of the job movement was to outside companies, offshore outsourcing.

=== Re-shoring ===
Reshoring, also known as onshoring, backshoring, or inshoring, is the act of reversing an offshoring change—moving a business process that was offshored back to the original country. John Urry, professor of sociology at Lancaster University, argues that the concealment of income, the avoidance of taxation and eluding legislation relating to work, finance, pleasure, waste, energy and security may be becoming a serious concern for democratic governments and ordinary citizens who may be adversely affected by unregulated, offshore activities. Further, the rising costs of transportation could lead to production nearer the point of consumption becoming more economically viable, particularly as new technologies such as additive manufacturing mature.

The World Bank's 2019 World Development Report on the future of work considers the potential for automation to drive companies to reshore production, reducing the role of labor in the process, and offers suggestions as to how governments can respond. A similar movement can be seen related to Robotic Process Automation, called RPA or RPAAI for self-guided RPA 2.0 based on artificial intelligence, where the incentive to move repetitive shared services work to lower cost countries is partially taken away by the progression of technology.

Melanie Rojas et al. in a 2022 Deloitte's report commend adopting a combination of re-shoring and friendshoring - "working with other nations and trusted supply sources" - as a business practice and policy initiative aiming to promote supply chain resilience. Empirical studies of 2018–2023 relocations indicate that reshoring to the home country comprised a small minority of observed moves (about 16% of 244 decisions), revealing a gap between policy rhetoric and actual corporate behavior; diversification across multiple foreign locations was far more prevalent.

== Practices ==
=== Destinations ===
After its accession to the World Trade Organization (WTO) in 2001, the People's Republic of China emerged as a prominent destination for production offshoring. Another focus area has been the software industry as part of global software development and developing global information systems. After technical progress in telecommunications improved the possibilities of trade in services, India became one prominent destination for such offshoring, though many parts of the world are now emerging as offshore destinations.

Since 2018, Vietnam has been the single most frequent recipient in manufacturing reconfigurations out of China, particularly in electronics, footwear and household goods, while Taiwan, India, Mexico and Thailand also attracted significant volumes as part of multi-country portfolios. Multi-destination moves increased over time—many firms paired, for example, India with Vietnam or Mexico with the United States—to balance cost, market access and policy risk. In numerous cases, companies retained China-based operations "in-China-for-China" while building parallel lines abroad, reflecting diversification rather than wholesale exit.

=== United States ===
Since the 1980s American companies have been "offshoring" and outsourcing manufacturing to low cost countries such as India, China, Malaysia, Pakistan and Vietnam.

==== Government response ====
President Barack Obama's 2011 SelectUSA program was the first federal program to promote and facilitate U.S. investment in partnership with the states. This program and website helps companies connect with resources available on a Federal, State and local level. In January 2012, President Obama issued a call to action to "invest in America" at the White House "Insourcing American Jobs" Forum.

==== Success stories ====
Advances in 3D printing technologies brought manufacturers closer to their customers. In the case of Starbucks, in 2012 it saved American Mug and Stein Company in East Liverpool, Ohio from bankruptcy.

==== Avoiding failure ====
Some cases of reshoring have not been successful. Otis Elevators' reshoring effort did not go well. Otis says it failed to consider the consequences of the new location and tried to do too much at once, including a supply-chain software implementation. This is not an uncommon reshoring scenario. Bringing manufacturing back to the United States isn't so simple, and there are a lot of considerations and analyses that companies must do to determine the costs and feasibility of reshoring. Some companies pursue reshoring with their own internal staff. But reshoring projects are complicated and involve engineering, marketing, production, finance, and procurement. In addition, there are real estate concerns, government incentives and training requirements that require outreach to the community. To help with these projects, companies often turn to consultants that specialize in reshoring.

=== United Kingdom ===
In the United Kingdom, companies have used the reintroduction of domestic call centres as a unique selling point. In 2014, the RSA Insurance Group completed a move of call centres back to Britain. The call centre industry in India has been hit by reshoring, as businesses including British Telecom, Santander UK and Aviva all announced they would move operations back to Britain in order to boost the economy and regain customer satisfaction.

=== R&D offshoring ===
Product design, research and the development (R&D) process is relatively difficult to offshore because R&D, to improve products and create new reference designs, requires a higher skill set not associated with cheap labor.

==== Transfer of intellectual property ====
There is a relationship between offshoring and patent-system strength. Companies under a strong patent system are not afraid to move work offshore because their work will remain their property. Conversely, companies in countries with weak patent systems have an increased fear of intellectual property theft from foreign vendors or workers, and, therefore, have less offshoring. Offshoring is often enabled by the transfer of valuable information to the offshore site. Such information and training enables the remote workers to produce results of comparable value previously produced by internal employees. When such transfer includes protected materials, as confidential documents and trade secrets, protected by non-disclosure agreements, then intellectual property has been transferred or exported. The documentation and valuation of such exports is quite difficult, but should be considered since it comprises items that may be regulated or taxable.

== Debate ==
Offshoring to foreign subsidiaries has been a controversial issue spurring heated debates among economists. Jobs go to the destination country and lower cost of goods and services to the origin country. On the other hand, job losses and wage erosion in developed countries have sparked opposition. Free trade with low-wage countries is win-lose for many employees who find their jobs offshored or with stagnating wages. Currency manipulation by governments and their central banks cause differences in labor cost. On May 1, 2002, Economist and former Ambassador Ernest H. Preeg testified before the Senate committee on Banking, Housing, and Urban Affairs that China, for instance, pegs its currency to the dollar at a sub-par value in violation of Article IV of the International Monetary Fund Articles of Agreement which state that no nation shall manipulate its currency to gain a market advantage.

=== Source of conflict ===
The opposing sides regarding offshoring, outsourcing, and offshore outsourcing are those seeking government intervention and protectionism versus the side advocating free trade. Jobs formerly held by U.S. workers have been lost, even as underdeveloped countries such as Brazil and Turkey flourish. Free-trade advocates suggest economies as a whole will obtain a net benefit from labor offshoring, but it is unclear if the displaced receive a net benefit. Some wages overseas are rising. A study by the U.S. Bureau of Labor Statistics found that Chinese wages were almost tripled in the seven years following 2002. Research suggests that these wage increases could redirect some offshoring elsewhere. Increased training and education has been advocated to offset trade-related displacements, but it is no longer a comparative advantage of high-wage nations because education costs are lower in low-wage countries.

=== U.S. labor market ===
In 2015, IT employment in the United States had reached pre-2001 levels, and has been rising since. The number of jobs lost to offshoring is less than 1 percent of the total US labor market. The total number of jobs lost to offshoring, both manufacturing and technical represent only 4 percent of the total jobs lost in the US. Major reasons for cutting jobs are from contract completion and downsizing. Some economists and commentators claim that the offshoring phenomenon is way overblown.

=== Impact on jobs in western countries ===
The Economist reported in January 2013 that "High levels of unemployment in Western countries after the 2007-2008 financial crisis have made the public in many countries so hostile towards offshoring that many companies are now reluctant to engage in it." Economist Paul Krugman wrote in 2007 that while free trade among high-wage countries is viewed as win-win, free trade with low-wage countries is win-lose for many employees who find their jobs offshored or with stagnating wages. Two estimates of the impact of offshoring on U.S. jobs were between 150,000 and 300,000 per year from 2004 to 2015. This represents 10-15% of U.S. job creation.

The increased safety net costs of the unemployed may be absorbed by the government (taxpayers) in the high-cost country or by the company doing the offshoring. Europe experienced less offshoring than the U.S. due to policies that applied more costs to corporations and cultural barriers. In the area of service research has found that offshoring has mixed effects on wages and employment. The World Bank's 2019 World Development Report on the future of work highlights how offshoring can shape the demand for skills in receiving countries and explores how increasing automation can lead to reshoring of production in some cases.

=== Public opinion ===
U.S. opinion polls indicate that between 76 and 95% of Americans surveyed agreed that "outsourcing of production and manufacturing work to foreign countries is a reason the U.S. economy is struggling and more people aren't being hired."

=== Ethical and reputational considerations ===
Empirical research has examined how offshoring has affected consumer perception and corporate reputation. Research indicates that the decision to offshore, particularly when associated with domestic layoffs, is correlated with reduced consumer trust, support, and lower firm evaluations of social responsibility.

Research has also investigated how firm disclosure affects consumer responses to offshoring decisions. Findings highlight how firms which clearly and openly reveal offshoring decisions and practices experience lower levels of decline in consumer trust compared to firms that do not. When offshoring is not openly disclosed and revealed later, consumers perceive higher levels of deception from the firm, resulting in decreases in consumer willingness to purchase from the firm.

For example, experimental research demonstrates that corporate offshoring decisions can often trigger strong emotional reactions among consumers when offshoring decisions are perceived to cause harm to domestic workers.

Reputational considerations of offshoring have also been demonstrated to influence firm decision-making. Evidence suggests that firms consider reputational implications when making offshoring decisions, which include changes in stakeholder perception and perceived brand value.

== Theory ==
=== Effects of factor of production mobility ===
According to classical economics, the three factors of production are land, labor, and capital. Offshoring relies heavily on the mobility of labor and capital; land has little or no mobility potential. In microeconomics, working capital funds the initial costs of offshoring. If the state heavily regulates how a corporation can spend its working capital, it will not be able to offshore its operations. For the same reason the macroeconomy must be free for offshoring to succeed. Computers and the Internet made work in the services industry electronically portable. Most theories that argue offshoring eventually benefits domestic workers assume that those workers will be able to obtain new jobs, even if by accepting lower salaries or by retraining themselves in a new field. Foreign workers benefit from new jobs and higher wages when the work moves to them. Labor scholars argue that global labor arbitrage leads to unethical practices, connected to exploitation of workers, eroding work conditions and decreasing job security.

== History ==
In the developed world, moving manufacturing jobs out of the country dates to at least the 1960s while moving knowledge service jobs offshore dates to the 1970s and has continued since then. It was characterized primarily by the transferring of factories from the developed to the developing world. This offshoring and closing of factories has caused a structural change in the developed world from an industrial to a post-industrial service society. During the 20th century, the decreasing costs of transportation and communication combined with great disparities on pay rates made increased offshoring from wealthier countries to less wealthy countries financially feasible for many companies. Further, the growth of the Internet, particularly fiber-optic intercontinental long haul capacity, and the World Wide Web reduced "transportation" costs for many kinds of information work to near zero.

=== Impact of the Internet ===
Regardless of size, companies benefit from accessibility to labor resources across the world. This gave rise to business models such as Remote In-Sourcing that allow companies to tap into resources found abroad, without losing control over security of product quality. New categories of work such as call centres, computer programming, reading medical data such as X-rays and magnetic resonance imaging, medical transcription, income tax preparation, and title searching are being offshored.

=== Ireland ===
Before the 1990s, Ireland was one of the poorest countries in the EU. Because of Ireland's relatively low corporate tax rates, US companies began offshoring of software, electronic, and pharmaceutical intellectual property to Ireland for export. This helped create a high-tech "boom" which led to Ireland becoming one of the richest EU countries.

=== NAFTA ===
In 1994, the North American Free Trade Agreement (NAFTA) went into effect, and it increased the velocity of physical restructuring. The plan to create free trade areas (such as Free Trade Area of the Americas) has not yet been successful. In 2005, offshoring of skilled work, also referred to as knowledge work, dramatically increased from the US, which fed the growing worries about threats of job loss.

== Related ==
- Bestshoring or rightshoring – picking the best country for offshoring
- Business process outsourcing (BPO) – outsourcing arrangements when entire business functions (such as finance, accounting, and customer service) are outsourced. More specific terms can be found in the field of software development, for example Global Information System as a class of systems being developed for/by globally distributed teams.
- Bodyshopping – practice of using offshored resources and personnel to do small disaggregated tasks within a business environment, without any broader intention to offshore an entire business function
- Inshoring – picking services in the same country

== See also ==
- Anti-globalization movement
- Balance of trade
- Decline and Fall of the American Programmer
- Domestic sourcing
- Follow-the-sun
- Free trade controversy
- Friendshoring
- Global delivery model
- Global labor arbitrage
- Global sourcing
- Globality
- Globally integrated enterprise
- Guest worker
- Information technology consulting
- Labor shortage
- List of international trade topics
- List of countries by imports
- List of countries by net goods exports
- List of countries by service exports
- Low-cost country sourcing
- Offshore company
- Offshore custom software development
- Offshoring Research Network
- Programmers Guild
- Restructuring
- Runaway production
- Tax haven
