= Globally integrated enterprise =

Organisational theory term

The globally integrated enterprise is a term coined in 2006 by Sam Palmisano, the then CEO of IBM Corp, used to denote "a company that fashions its strategy, its management, and its operations in pursuit of a new goal: the integration of production and value delivery worldwide."

== The Argument ==
Palmisano argues that in the international model of the 20th century, most operations were centred in their home country, with only elements of sales and distribution happening overseas. The multinational model of the 21st century—in which companies created small versions of themselves in each country—was a response to the trade barriers that arose after the World Wars. For IBM—Palmisano's employer—this was a successful model because it enabled the company to grow in those markets, understand local customer requirements and cultivate local talent. But it also created redundancy or duplication as each country had its own back-office functions, such as— supply, procurement, finance and human resources.

Now the globally integrated enterprise can locate functions anywhere in the world, based on the right cost, skills and environment, argues Palmisano. For example, IBM now has one supply chain; and this new organizational macrostructure has emerged because everything is connected, and work can move to the place where it is performed cheapest. This approach is made possible due to the rise of globalization, and coming down of many of the barriers that haltered cross-border commerce.

Palmisano mentions the Law of Global Integration, driven by three forces—economics, expertise and openness—without explicitly stating what it is or how it can be verified.

== Criticisms ==
Brad Setser of Roubini Global Economics (RGE) Monitor wrote: "In my view, this underscores a key element of tension in America’s current backlash against globalization that was not evident in the late 1980s. Today, the pressures are being borne disproportionately by labor, whereas 20 years ago, capital and labor were in the struggle together.... Today, US companies, as seen through the lens of corporate profitability, are thriving as never before while the American workforce is increasingly isolated in its competitive squeeze."

== See also ==
- Globality
- Globalization
- Offshoring
