= China Plus One =

Business strategy

China Plus One, also known simply as Plus One or C+1, is the business strategy of avoiding investing only in China or sourcing only from China, and diversifying business into other countries, or channeling investments into manufacturing in other promising developing economies such as India, Thailand or Vietnam. For the last 20 years, western companies have invested mainly in China, drawn in by their low production costs, and enormous domestic consumer markets. Developing from the overconcentration of business interests in China, it may be done for reasons of cost, safety, or long-term stability. It has also been described as a 'macro-level phenomenon'.

== Corporate C+1 strategies ==
The increasing cost of doing business in China has also increased operating costs, especially for manufacturers. The advantages of the cheap labor and market demand that China initially provided has increasingly been overshadowed by the advantages that ASEAN countries can provide. These benefits include cost control, as workers in South and Southeast Asian countries are generally less expensive than Chinese employees, risk diversification, and new market access into economies There is also a high level of risk for investors in the Chinese transitional economy, the sources of this risk can be credited to social, and political change.

Multinational corporations have been looking at countries with adequately stable governments like India, Vietnam, Indonesia, Malaysia, Thailand, Philippines, Brunei and Bangladesh. Countries like Japan and United States are part of the phenomenon, with the strategy conceptualizing in businesses in these countries as early as 2008. However the China Plus One strategy has its own share of difficulties, including navigating new laws, new markets, and streamlining the business over multiple locations. Some say that moving out of China now is not even practical. The China Plus One strategy does give China its own benefits. China is able to maintain low-end manufacturing while also growing higher-value sectors. China Plus One strategy did not reduce the number of manufacturers, nor jobs in manufacturing. It does, however, reduce the number of growth, giving other economies a chance to flourish.

Following the COVID-19 pandemic, numerous Indian companies have adopted strategies to find alternative supply chains. India's largest air conditioner manufacturer Voltas has started production of motors in India to reduce its reliance on China; Indian auto component manufacturers are also building their supply base to shift out of China, changing reliance to local vendors for some components; the same is the case for pharmaceutical companies.

== See also ==
- Friendshoring
- Belt and road
- Non-China supply chain
