= Outsourcing =

Contracting internal tasks to an external organization

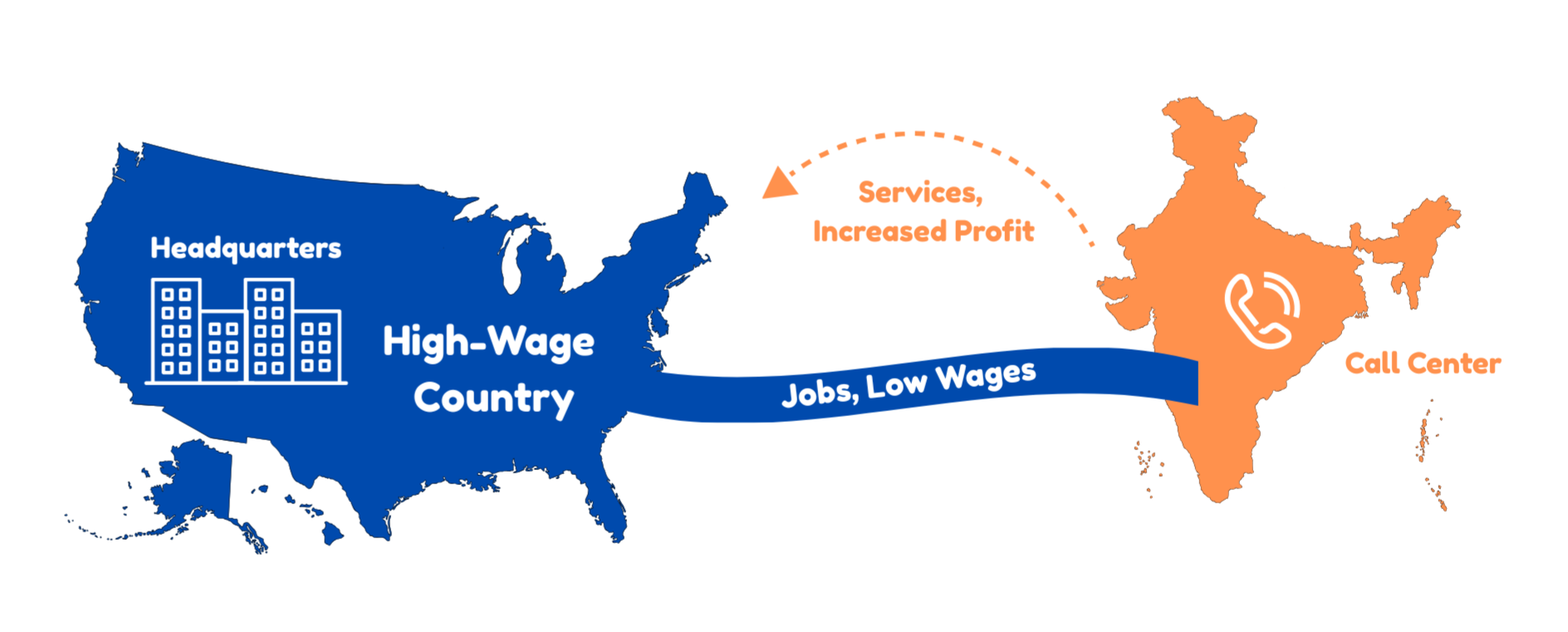
Worldwide communication allowed customer service interactions to be outsourced to low-wage countries, particularly in call centers.

Outsourcing is a business practice in which companies use external providers to carry out business processes that would otherwise be handled internally. Outsourcing sometimes involves transferring employees and assets from one firm to another, or forming a separate legal entity that acts as a management service organization (MSO).

The term outsourcing, which came from the phrase outside resourcing, originated no later than 1981 at a time when industrial jobs in the United States were being moved overseas, contributing to the economic and cultural collapse of small, industrial towns. In some contexts, the term smartsourcing is also used.

The concept, which The Economist says has "made its presence felt since the time of the Second World War", often involves the contracting out of a business process (e.g., payroll processing, claims processing), operational, and/or non-core functions, such as manufacturing, facility management, call center/call center support.

The practice of handing over control of public services to private enterprises (privatization), even if conducted on a limited, short-term basis, may also be described as outsourcing.

Outsourcing includes both foreign and domestic contracting, and should not be confused with offshoring which refers to relocating a business process to another country and may or may not involve a third-party provider. In practice, the concepts can be intertwined, i.e. offshore outsourcing, and can be individually or jointly, partially or completely reversed, as described by terms such as reshoring, inshoring, and insourcing.

== Motivation ==
=== Theoretical frameworks ===
Global labor arbitrage can provide major financial savings from lower international labor rates, which could be a major motivation for offshoring. Cost savings from economies of scale and specialization can also motivate outsourcing, even if not offshoring. Since about 2015 indirect revenue benefits have increasingly become additional motivators.

Another motivation is speed to market. To make this work, a new process was developed: "outsource the outsourcing process". Details of managing DuPont's chief information officer Cinda Hallman's $4 billion 10-year outsourcing contract with Computer Sciences Corporation and Accenture were outsourced, thus avoiding "inventing a process if we'd done it in-house". A term subsequently developed to describe this is midsourcing.

Outsourcing can offer greater budget flexibility and control by allowing organizations to pay for the services and business functions they need, when they need them. It is often perceived to reduce hiring and training specialized staff, to make available specialized expertise, and to decrease capital, operating expenses, and risk.

"Do what you do best and outsource the rest" has become an internationally recognized business tagline first "coined and developed" in the 1990s by management consultant Peter Drucker. The slogan was primarily used to advocate outsourcing as a viable business strategy. Drucker began explaining the concept of "outsourcing" as early as 1989 in his Wall Street Journal article entitled "Sell the Mailroom".

From Drucker's perspective, a company should only seek to subcontract in those areas in which it demonstrated no special ability. The business strategy outlined by his slogan recommended that companies should take advantage of a specialist provider's knowledge and economies of scale to improve performance and achieve the service needed.

In 2009, by way of recognition, Peter Drucker posthumously received a significant honor when he was inducted into the Outsourcing Hall of Fame for his outstanding work in the field.

The biggest difference between outsourcing and in-house provision is with regards to the difference in ownership: outsourcing usually presupposes the integration of business processes under a different ownership, over which the client business has minimal or no control. This requires the use of outsourcing relationship management.

Sometimes the effect of what looks like outsourcing from one side and insourcing from the other side can be unexpected; The New York Times reported in 2001 that "6.4 million Americans .. worked for foreign companies as of 2001, [but] more jobs are being outsourced than" [the reverse].

=== Reasons for outsourcing ===
While U.S. companies do not outsource to reduce high top level executive or managerial costs, they primarily outsource to reduce peripheral and "non-core" business expenses. Common drivers include labor cost differences, tax considerations, access to the worlds' top talent, and compliance requirements.

Mandated benefits like social security, Medicare, and safety protection (e.g. Occupational Safety and Health Administration regulations) are also motivators. By contrast, executive pay in the U.S. in 2007, which could exceed 400 times more than average workers—a gap 20 times bigger than it was in 1965, is not a factor.

Other reasons include reducing and controlling operating costs, improving company focus, gaining access to world-class capabilities, tax credits, freeing internal resources for other purposes, streamlining or increasing efficiency for time-consuming functions, and maximizing use of external resources. For small businesses, contracting/subcontracting/"outsourcing" might be done to improve work-life balance.

== Outsourcing agreements ==
Two organizations may enter into a contractual agreement involving an exchange of services, expertise, and payments. Outsourcing is said to help firms to perform well in their core competencies, fuel innovation, and mitigate a shortage of skill or expertise in the areas where they want to outsource. Established good practices include covering exit arrangements within an outsourcing agreement, with an exit period and a mutual commitment to maintaining continuity until the exit phase is completed.

== History ==
=== 20th century ===
Following the adding of management layers in the 1950s and 1960s to support expansion for the sake of economy of scale, corporations found that agility and added profits could be obtained by focusing on core strengths; the 1970s and 1980s were the beginnings of what later was named outsourcing. Kodak's 1989 "outsourcing most of its information technology systems" was followed by others during the 1990s.

In 2013, the International Association of Outsourcing Professionals gave recognition to Electronic Data Systems Corporation's Morton H. Meyerson who, in 1967, proposed the business model that eventually became known as outsourcing.

==== IT-enabled services offshore outsourcing ====
The growth of offshoring of IT-enabled services, although not universally accepted, both to subsidiaries and to outside companies (offshore outsourcing) is linked to the availability of large amounts of reliable and affordable communication infrastructure following the telecommunication and Internet expansion of the late 1990s. Services making use of low-cost countries included:

- back-office and administrative functions, such as finance and accounting, HR, and legal
- call centers and other customer-facing departments, such as marketing and sales services
- IT infrastructure and application development
- knowledge services, including engineering support, product design, research and development, and analytics

=== Early 21st century ===
In the early 21st century, businesses increasingly outsourced to suppliers outside their own country, sometimes referred to as offshoring or offshore outsourcing. Other options subsequently emerged including: nearshoring, crowdsourcing, multisourcing, strategic alliances/strategic partnerships, strategic outsourcing.

Forbes considered the 2016 U.S. presidential election "the most disruptive change agent for the outsourcing industry", especially the renewed "invest in America" goal highlighted in campaigning, but the magazine tepidly reversed direction in 2019 as to the outcome for employment. In the case of armament acquisition, section 323 of the National Defense Authorization Act for 2014 requires military personnel "to solicit information from all U.S.-owned arsenals regarding the capability of that arsenal to fulfill the manufacturing requirement" when undertaking a make-or-buy analysis.

Furthermore, there are growing legal requirements for data protection, where obligations and implementation details must be understood by both sides. This includes dealing with customer rights.

UK government policy notes that certain services must remain in-house, citing the development of policy, stewardship of tax spend and retention of certain critical knowledge as examples. Guidance states that specific criteria must govern the identification of such services, and that "everything else" could potentially be outsourced.

There are few companies from all around the world like Automation Anywhere, UiPath, Datamatics Business Solutions Limited (DBSL), and Nintex which provide Outsourcing services.

==== Limitations due to growth ====
Inflation, high domestic interest rates, and economic growth pushed India's IT salaries 10–15%, making some jobs relatively "too" expensive, compared to other offshoring destinations. Areas for advancing within the value chain included research and development, equity analysis, tax-return processing, radiological analysis, and medical transcription.

=== Growth of white-collar outsourcing ===
Although offshoring initially focused on manufacturing, white-collar offshoring/outsourcing has grown rapidly since the early 21st century. The digital workforce of countries like India and China are only paid a fraction of what would be minimum wage in the United States. On average, software engineers in India are getting paid between 250,000 and 1,500,000 rupees (US$4,000 to US$23,000) per year as opposed to $40,000–$100,000 in countries such as the U.S. and Canada. Closer to the U.S., Costa Rica has become a major source for the advantages of a highly educated labor force, a large bilingual population, stable democratic government, and similar time zones as the U.S. It takes only a few hours to travel between Costa Rica and U.S. Companies such as Intel, Procter & Gamble, HP, Gensler, Amazon and Bank of America have big operations in Costa Rica.

Unlike outsourced manufacturing, outsourced white collar workers have flextime and can choose their working hours, and for which companies to work. Clients benefit from remote work, reduced office space, management salary, and employee benefits as these individuals are independent contractors.

Ending a government outsourcing arrangement poses difficulties.

== Variations ==
There are many outsourcing models, with variations by country, year and industry. Japanese companies often outsource to China. German companies have outsourced to Eastern European countries with German-language affiliation, such as Poland and Romania. French companies outsource to North Africa for similar reasons. For Australian IT companies, Indonesia is one of the major choice of offshoring destination. Near-shore location, common time zone and adequate IT work force are the reasons for offshoring IT services to Indonesia.

Another approach is to differentiate between tactical and strategic outsourcing models. Tactical models include:

- Staff augmentation
- Project-based
- To gain expertise not available in-house

Strategic consultancy includes for business process improvement.

=== Innovation outsourcing ===
Innovation outsourcing involves finding a suitable supplier to provide the innovation necessary to bring new and up to date products and services to the market, and is especially important where a business would otherwise need to take on a significant amount of new knowledge in order to undertake its own innovation.

When offshore outsourcing knowledge work, firms heavily rely on the availability of technical personnel at offshore locations. One of the challenges in offshoring engineering innovation is a reduction in quality.

=== Co-sourcing ===
Co-sourcing is a hybrid which joins together internal staff and staff from an external service provider. Co-sourcing can reduce sourcing risks, increase transparency and clarity, and lead toward better control than full outsourcing. For example, co-sourcing audit services can supplement an internal audit team, bringing in specialist skills such as information risk management or integrity services, or help during peak periods, in assist in a similar way in other areas such as software development and human resources.

==== Identity management co-sourcing ====
Identity management co-sourcing is when on-site hardware interacts with outside identity services.

This contrasts with an "all in-the-cloud" service scenario, where the identity service is built, hosted and operated by the service provider in an externally hosted, cloud computing infrastructure.

==== Offshore software R&D co-sourcing ====
Offshore software R&D is the provision of software development services by a supplier (whether external or internal) located in a different country from the one where the software will be used. The global software R&D services market, as contrasted to information technology outsourcing (ITO) and business process outsourcing (BPO), is rather young and currently is at a relatively early stage of development.

===== Countries involved in outsourced software R&D =====
Canada, India, Ireland, and Israel were the four leading countries as of 2003. Although many countries have participated in the offshore outsourcing of software development, their involvement in co-sourced and outsourced Research & Development (R&D) was somewhat limited. Canada, the second largest by 2009, had 21%.

As of 2018, the top three were deemed by one "research-based policy analysis and commentary from leading economists" as China, India and Israel."

Gartner Group adds in Russia, but does not make clear whether this is pure R&D or run-of-the-mill IT outsourcing.

== Implications ==
=== Performance measurement ===
Focusing on software quality metrics can assist in tracking the performance of a project.

=== Management processes ===
Globalization and complex supply chains, along with greater physical distance between higher management and the production-floor employees often requires a change in management methodologies, as inspection and feedback may not be as direct and frequent as in internal processes. This often requires the assimilation of new communication methods such as voice over IP, instant messaging, and issue tracking systems, new time management methods such as time tracking software, and new cost- and schedule-assessment tools such as cost estimation software.

The term "transition methodology" describes the process of migrating knowledge, systems, and operating capabilities between the two sides.

==== Communications and customer service ====
In the area of call-center outsourcing, especially when combined with offshoring, agents may speak with different linguistic features such as accents, word use and phraseology, which may impede comprehension.

==== Governance ====
In 1979, Nobel laureate Oliver E. Williamson wrote that the governance structure is the "framework within which the integrity of a transaction is decided", and that "because contracts are varied and complex, governance structures vary with the nature of the transaction". University of Tennessee researchers have been studying complex outsourcing relationships since 2003. Emerging thinking regarding strategic outsourcing is focusing on creating a contract structure in which the parties have a vested interest in managing what are often highly complex business arrangements in a more collaborative, aligned, flexible, and credible way.

==== Security ====
Reduced security, sometimes related to lower loyalty may occur, even when 'outsourced' staff change their legal status but not their desk. While security and compliance issues are supposed to be addressed through the contract between the client and the suppliers, fraud cases have been reported.

In April 2005, a high-profile case involved the theft of $350,000 from four Citibank customers when call-center workers acquired the passwords to customer accounts and transferred the money to their own accounts opened under fictitious names. Citibank did not find out about the problem until the American customers noticed discrepancies with their accounts and notified the bank.

==== Information technology ====
Richard Baldwin's 2006 The Great Unbundling work was followed in 2012 by Globalization's Second Acceleration (the Second Unbundling) and in 2016 by The Great Convergence: Information Technology and the New Globalization. It is here, rather than in manufacturing, that the bits economy can advance in ways that the economy of atoms and things cannot: an early 1990s Newsweek ran a half page cartoon showing someone who had just ordered a pizza online, and was seeking help to download it.

==== Step-in rights ====
Step-in rights allow the client or a nominated third party the right to step-in and intervene, in particular to directly operate the outsourced services or to appoint a new operator. Circumstances where step-in rights may be contractually invoked may include supplier insolvency, a force majeure event which prevents or impedes the outsourced service provision, where the client believes that there is a substantial risk to the provision of the services, or where performance fails to meet a defined critical level of service. Suitable clauses in a contract may provide for the outsourced service provider to pay any additional costs which are faced by the client and specify that the provider's obligation to provide the services is annulled or suspended.

If a contract has a clause granting step-in rights, then there is a right, though not an obligation, to take over a task that is not going well, or even the entire project. When and How are important: "What is the process for stepping-in" must be clearly defined in the collateral warranty.

An example of when there is sometimes hesitancy about exercising this right was reported by the BBC in 2018, when Wealden District Council in East Sussex was "considering exercising 'step in rights' on its waste collection contract with Kier" due to issues of poor service. After some discussion in this case, a "recovery plan" was agreed with the contractor so that the step in rights were not actually exercised.

Stabler notes that in the event that step-in rights are taken up, it is important to establish which elements of a process are business-critical and ensure these are made top priority when implementing the step-in.

== Issues ==
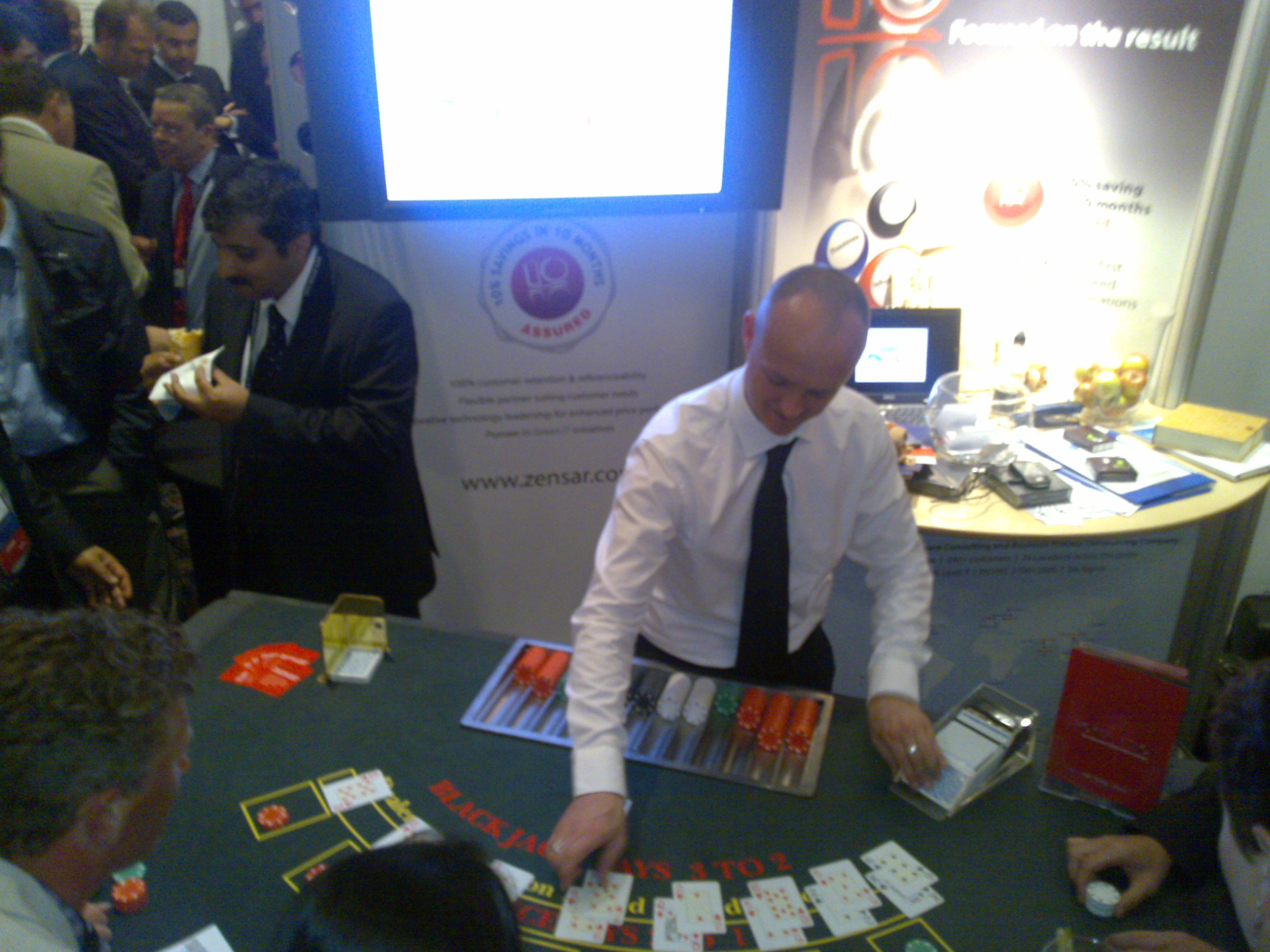
Demonstrating need to ensure outsourcing gains are realised and losses avoided at a summit in London in 2009

A number of outsourcings and offshorings that were deemed failures led to reversals signaled by use of terms such as insourcing and reshoring. The New York Times reported in 2017 that IBM "plans to hire 25,000 more workers in the United States over the next four years," overlapping India-based Infosys's "10,000 workers in the United States over the next two years." A clue to a tipping point having been reached was a short essay titled "Maybe You Shouldn't Outsource Everything After All" and the longer "That Job Sent to India May Now Go to Indiana."

Among problems encountered were supply-and-demand induced raises in salaries and lost benefits of similar-time-zone. Other issues were differences in language and culture. Another reason for a decrease in outsourcing is that many jobs that were subcontracted abroad have been replaced by technological advances.

According to a 2005 Deloitte Consulting survey, a quarter of the companies which had outsourced tasks reversed their strategy.

These reversals, however, did not undo the damage. New factories often:

- were in different locations
- needed different skill sets
- used more automation

Public opinion in the U.S. and other Western powers opposing outsourcing was particularly strengthened by the drastic increase in unemployment due to the 2008 financial crisis. From 2000 to 2010, the U.S. experienced a net loss of 687,000 jobs due to outsourcing, primarily in the computers and electronics sector. Public disenchantment with outsourcing has not only stirred political responses, as seen in the 2012 U.S. presidential campaigns, but it has also made companies more reluctant to outsource or offshore jobs.

A counterswing depicted by a 2016 Deloitte survey suggested that companies are no longer reluctant to outsource. Deloitte's survey identified three trends:

- Companies are broadening their approach to outsourcing as they begin to view it as more than a simple cost-cutting play
- Organizations are "redefining the ways they enter into outsourcing relationships and manage the ensuing risks".
- Organizations are changing the way they are managing their relationships with outsourcing providers to "maximize the value of those relationships".

=== Insourcing ===
Insourcing is the process of reversing an outsourcing, possibly using help from those not currently part of the in-house staff. Some authors call this backsourcing, reserving the term insourcing to refer simply to conducting certain activities in-house.

Outsourcing has gone through many iterations and reinventions, and some outsourcing contracts have been partially or fully reversed. Often the reason is to maintain control of critical production or competencies, and insourcing is used to reduce costs of taxes, labor and transportation. Sometimes there are problems with the outsourcing agreements, because of the pressure to bring jobs back to their home country, or simply because it has stopped being efficient to outsource particular tasks.

Studies conducted at companies confirm the positive impact of using insourcing on financial performance.

==== Regional insourcing ====
Regional insourcing, a related term, takes place when a company assigns work to a subsidiary that is within the same country. This differs from onshoring and reshoring, which may be either inside or outside the company. For this process, a company establishes satellite locations for specific entities of their business, making use of advantages one state may have over another, such as taxes, education, or workforce skill sets, This concept focuses on the delegating or reassigning of procedures, functions, or jobs from production within a business in one location to another internal entity that specializes in that operation. This allows companies to streamline production, boost competency, and increase their bottom line.

This competitive strategy applies the classical argument of Adam Smith, which posits that two nations would benefit more from one another by trading the goods that they are more proficient at manufacturing.

==== Net effect on jobs ====
To those who are concerned that nations may be losing a net number of jobs due to outsourcing, some point out that insourcing also occurs. A 2004 study in the U.S., the UK, and many other industrialized countries more jobs are insourced than outsourced. The New York Times disagreed, and wrote that free trade with low-wage countries is win-lose for many employees who find their jobs offshored or with stagnating wages.

The impact of offshore outsourcing, according to two estimates published by The Economist, showed unequal effect during the period studied 2004 to 2015, ranging from 150,000 to as high as 300,000 jobs lost per year.

In 2010, a group of manufacturers started the Reshoring Initiative, focusing on bringing manufacturing jobs for American companies back to the country. Their data indicated that 140,000 American jobs were lost in 2003 due to offshoring. Eleven years later in 2014, the U.S. recovered 10,000 of those offshored positions; this marked the highest net gain in 20 years. More than 90% of the jobs that American companies "offshored" and outsourced manufacturing to low cost countries such as China, Malaysia and Vietnam did not return.

==== Insourcing crossbreeds ====
The fluctuation of prefixes and names give rise to many more "cross-breeds" of insourcing. For example, "offshore insourcing" is "when companies set up their own "captive" process centers overseas, sometimes called a Captive Service, taking advantage of their cheaper surroundings while maintaining control of their back-office work and business processes." "Remote insourcing" refers to hiring developers to work in-house from virtual (remote) facilities.

==== In the U.S. ====
A 2012 series of articles in The Atlantic highlighted a turning of the tide for parts of the U.S.'s manufacturing industry. Specific causes identified include rising third-world wages, recognition of hidden off-shoring costs, innovations in design/manufacture/assembly/time-to-market, increasing fuel and transportation costs, falling energy costs in the U.S., increasing U.S. labor productivity, and union flexibility. Hiring at GE's giant Appliance Park in Louisville, Kentucky, increased 90% during 2012.

===== 100% U.S.-based =====
More than one company uses a "100% U.S.-based" phrase, whether within or outside their envelopes. "100% US-based customer service available 24/7" is how, in 2024, Business Insider described the expectations of some customers.

=== Standpoint of labor ===
From the standpoint of labor, outsourcing may represent a new threat, contributing to worker insecurity, and is reflective of the general process of globalization and economic polarization.

- Low-skilled work: Low-skill work outsourced to contractors who tend to employ migrant labor is causing a revival of radical trade union activity. In the UK, major hospitals, universities, ministries and corporations are being pressured.
- In-housing: In January 2020, Tim Orchard, the CEO of Imperial College Healthcare Trust, stated that the in-housing of over 1,000 Sodexo cleaners, caterers and porters across five NHS hospitals in London "will create additional cost pressures next year but we are confident that there are also benefits to unlock, arising from better team working, more co-ordinated planning and improved quality."
- U.S. base: On June 26, 2009, Jeff Immelt, the CEO of General Electric, called for the U.S. to increase its manufacturing base employment to 20% of the workforce, commenting that the U.S. has outsourced too much and can no longer rely on consumer spending to drive demand.

=== Standpoint of government ===
Western governments may attempt to compensate workers affected by outsourcing through various forms of legislation. In Europe, the Acquired Rights Directive attempts to address the issue. The directive is implemented differently in different nations. In the U.S., the Trade Adjustment Assistance Act is meant to provide compensation for workers directly affected by international trade agreements. Whether or not these policies provide the security and fair compensation they promise is debatable.

==== Government response ====
In response to the recession, U.S. president Barack Obama launched the SelectUSA program in 2011. In January 2012, Obama issued a Call to Action to Invest in America at the White House "Insourcing American Jobs" Forum. Obama met with representatives of Otis Elevator, Apple, DuPont, Master Lock, and others which had recently brought jobs back or made significant investments in the U.S.

==== Legislative authorisation ====
Governments may legislate to authorise the outsourcing of specific functions or the work of specific government agencies, for example in the United Kingdom, the Social Security Administration Act 1992 (as amended) authorises the contracting-out of work-focussed interviews and documentary work, and the Contracting Out of Functions (Tribunal Staff) Order 2009 authorises the contracting-out of tribunals' administrative work.

==== Policy-making strategy ====
A main feature of outsourcing influencing policy-making is the unpredictability it generates, including its defense/military ramifications, regarding the future of any particular sector or skill-group. The uncertainty of future conditions influences governance approaches to different aspects of long-term policies.

In particular, distinction is needed between

- cyclical unemployment – for which pump it up solutions have worked in the past, and
- structural unemployment – when "businesses and industries that employed them no longer exist, and their skills no longer have the value they once did."

===== Competitiveness =====
A governance that attempts adapting to the changing environment will facilitate growth and a stable transition to new economic structures until the economic structures become detrimental to the social, political and cultural structures.

Automation increases output and allows for reduced cost per item. When these changes are not well synchronized, unemployment or underemployment is a likely result. When transportation costs remain unchanged, the negative effect may be permanent; jobs in protected sectors may no longer exist.

Studies suggest that the effect of U.S. outsourcing on Mexico is that for every 10% increase in U.S. wages, north Mexico cities along the border experienced wage rises of 2.5%, about 0.69% higher than in inner cities.

By contrast, higher rates of saving and investment in Asian countries, along with rising levels of education, studies suggest, fueled the 'Asian miracle' rather than improvements in productivity and industrial efficiency. There was also an increase in patenting and research and development expenditures.

===== Industrial policy =====
Outsourcing results from an internationalization of labor markets as more tasks become tradable. According to leading economist Greg Mankiw, the labour market functions under the same forces as the market of goods, with the underlying implication that the greater the number of tasks available to being moved, the better for efficiency under the gains from trade. With technological progress, more tasks can be offshored at different stages of the overall corporate process.

The tradeoffs are not always balanced, and a 2004 viewer of the situation said "the total number of jobs realized in the United States from insourcing is far less than those lost through outsourcing."

===== Environmental policy =====
Import competition has caused a de facto 'race-to-the-bottom' where countries lower environmental regulations to secure a competitive edge for their industries relative to other countries.

As Mexico competes with China over Canadian and American markets, its national Commission for Environmental Cooperation has not been active in enacting or enforcing regulations to prevent environmental damage from increasingly industrialized Export Processing Zones. Similarly, since the signing of the North American Free Trade Agreement, heavy industries have increasingly moved to the U.S., which has a comparative advantage due to its abundant presence of capital and well-developed technology. A further example of environmental de-regulation with the objective of protecting trade incentives have been the numerous exemptions to carbon taxes in European countries during the 1990s.

Although outsourcing can influence environmental de-regulatory trends, the added cost of preventing pollution does not majorly determine trade flows or industrialization.

=== Success stories ===
Companies such as ET Water Systems (now a Jain Irrigation Systems company), GE Appliances and Caterpillar found that with the increase of labor costs in Japan and China, the cost of shipping and custom fees, it cost only about 10% more to manufacture in America. Advances in technology and automation such as 3D printing technologies have made bringing manufacturing back to the U.S., both cost effective and possible. Adidas, for example, plans to produce highly customized shoes with 3D printers in the U.S.

=== Globalization and socio-economic implications ===
==== Industrialization ====
Outsourcing has contributed to further levelling of global inequalities as it has led to general trends of industrialization in the Global South and deindustrialization in the Global North.

Not all manufacturing should return to the U.S. The rise of the middle class in China, India and other countries has created markets for the products made in those countries. Just as the U.S. has a Made in USA program, other countries support products being made domestically. Localization, the process of manufacturing products for the local market, is an approach to keeping some manufacturing offshore and bringing some of it back. Besides the cost savings of manufacturing closer to the market, the lead time for adapting to changes in the market is faster.

The rise in industrial efficiency which characterized development in developed countries has occurred as a result of labor-saving technological improvements. Although these improvements do not directly reduce employment levels but rather increase output per unit of work, they can indirectly diminish the amount of labor required for fixed levels of output.

==== Growth and income ====
It has been suggested that "workers require more education and different skills, working with software rather than drill presses" rather than rely on limited growth labor requirements for non-tradable services.

=== Usability issues in offshore development ===
The main driver for offshoring development work has been the greater availability of developers at a lower cost than in the home country. However, the rise in offshore development has taken place in parallel with an increased awareness of the importance of usability, and the user experience, in software. Outsourced development poses special problems for development, i.e. the more formal, contractual relationship between the supplier and client, and geographical separation place greater distance between the developers and users, which makes it harder to reflect the users' needs in the final product. This problem is exacerbated if the development is offshore. Further complications arise from cultural differences, which apply even if the development is carried out by an in-house offshore team.

Historically offshore development concentrated on back office functions but, as offshoring has grown, a wider range of applications have been developed. Offshore suppliers have had to respond to the commercial pressures arising from usability issues by building up their usability expertise. Indeed, this problem has presented an attractive opportunity to some suppliers to move up market and offer higher value services.

==== 2000-2012 R&D ====
As forecast in 2003, R&D is outsourced. Ownership of intellectual property by the outsourcing company, despite outside development, was the goal. To defend against tax-motivated cost-shifting, the U.S. government passed regulations in 2006 to make outsourcing research harder. Despite many R&D contracts given to Indian universities and labs, only some research solutions were patented.

While Pfizer moved some of its R&D from the UK to India, a Forbes article suggested that it is increasingly more dangerous to offshore IP-sensitive projects to India, because of India's continued ignorance of patent regulations. In turn, companies such as Pfizer and Novartis, have lost rights to sell many of their cancer medications in India because of lack of IP protection.

==== Future trends ====
A Mayer Brown article, "The Future of Outsourcing", published by University of Chicago Law School in 2018, begins with "The future of outsourcing is digital." According to other sources, the "Do what you do best and outsource the rest" approach means that "integration with retained systems" is the new transition challenge; people training still exists, but is merely an "also".

There is more complexity than before, especially when the outside company may be an integrator.

While the number of technically skilled labor grows in India, Indian offshore companies are increasingly tapping into the skilled labor already available in Eastern Europe to better address the needs of the Western European R&D market.

== Practice by state or region ==
=== United States ===
Protection of some data involved in outsourcing, such as about patients (HIPAA) is one of the few federal protections.

"Outsourcing" is a continuing political issue in the U.S., having been conflated with offshoring during the 2004 U.S. presidential election. The political debate centered on outsourcing's consequences for the domestic U.S. workforce. Democratic U.S. presidential candidate John Kerry called U.S. firms that outsource jobs abroad or that incorporate overseas in tax havens to avoid paying their "fair share" of U.S. taxes "Benedict Arnold corporations".

A Zogby International August 2004 poll found that 71% of American voters believed "outsourcing jobs overseas" hurt the economy while another 62% believed that the U.S. government should impose some legislative action against these companies, possibly in the form of increased taxes. President Obama promoted the Bring Jobs Home Act to help reshore jobs by using tax cuts and credits for moving operations back to the U.S. The same bill was reintroduced in the 113th U.S. Congress.

While labor advocates claim union busting as one possible cause of outsourcing, another claim is high corporate income tax rate in the U.S. relative to other OECD nations, and the practice of taxing revenues earned outside of U.S. jurisdiction, a very uncommon practice. Some counterclaim that the actual taxes paid by U.S. corporations may be considerably lower than "official" rates due to the use of tax loopholes, tax havens, and "gaming the system".

Sarbanes-Oxley has also been cited as a factor.

==== Outsourcing visa ====
The U.S. has a special visa, the H-1B, which enables American companies to temporarily (up to three years, or by extension, six) hire foreign workers to supplement their employees or replace those holding existing positions. In hearings on this matter, a U.S. senator called these "their outsourcing visa".

=== Europe ===
The European Council's Directive 77/187 of 14 February 1977 protects employees' rights in the event of transfers of undertakings, businesses or parts of businesses (as amended 29 June 1998, Directive 98/50/EC and 12 March 2001's Directive 2001/23). Rights acquired by employees with the former employer are to be safeguarded when they, together with the undertaking in which they are employed, are transferred to another employer, i.e., the contractor.

Case subsequent to the European Court of Justice's Christel Schmidt v. Spar- und Leihkasse der früheren Ämter Bordesholm, Kiel und Cronshagen, Case C-392/92 [1994] have disputed whether a particular contracting-out exercise constituted a transfer of an undertaking (see, for example, Ayse Süzen v. Zehnacker Gebäudereinigung GmbH Krankenhausservice, Case C-13/95 [1997]). In principle, employees may benefit from the protection offered by the directive.

=== Asia ===
Countries which have been the focus of outsourcing include India and the Philippines for American and European companies, and China and Vietnam for Japanese companies. In the Philippines, firms such as Select VoiceCom are expanding their call-centre and business process outsourcing operations by integrating artificial-intelligence tools and serving global clients, reflecting the country's evolving outsourcing model.

The Asian IT service market is still in its infancy, but in 2008, industry think tank Nasscom-McKinsey predicted a $17 billion IT service industry in India alone.

A China-based company, Lenovo, outsourced/reshored manufacturing of some time-critical customized PCs to the U.S. since "If it made them in China they would spend six weeks on a ship."

Article 44 of Japan's Employment Security Act implicitly bans the domestic/foreign workers supplied by unauthorized companies regardless of their operating locations. The law will apply if at least one party of suppliers, clients, labors reside in Japan, and if the labors are the integral part of the chain of command by the client company, or the supplier.

- No person shall carry out a labor supply business or have workers supplied by a person who carries out a labor supply business work under his/her own directions or orders, except in cases provided for in the following Article.
  - A person who falls under any of the following items shall be punished by imprisonment with work for not more than one year or a fine of not more than one million yen. (Article 64)
- Unless permitted by act, no person shall obtain profit by intervening, as a business, in the employment of another.

Victims can lodge a criminal complaint against the CEO of the suppliers and clients. The CEO risks arrest, and the Japanese company may face a private settlement with financial package in the range between 20 and 100 million JPY ($200,000 – US$1 million).

== Examples ==
- In 2003 Procter & Gamble outsourced their facilities' management support, but it did not involve offshoring.
- Dell offshored to India in 2001 but reversed this since "customers were not happy with the prior arrangement ...".

=== Aviation ===
In the United States, airlines may contract aircraft maintenance to domestic or foreign repair stations. A 2016 U.S. Government Accountability Office analysis of 28 selected commercial airlines found that contracted maintenance spending accounted for 58–64% of their total annual maintenance spending from 2010 through 2014. Airlines interviewed by the agency generally kept most light, routine maintenance in-house, while contracting some or all more involved work when doing so was more cost-effective; that work could require specialized skills and equipment. Federal Aviation Administration guidance states that the air carrier nevertheless retains primary responsibility for airworthiness and must maintain controls over contracted work.

Ground handling is another function that may be outsourced. In 2020, during the COVID-19 pandemic, Qantas outsourced ground handling operations at ten Australian airports, affecting about 1,800 employees. The trial judge found that, despite commercial imperatives, Qantas had not disproved that its reasons also included preventing employees from later engaging in protected industrial action and enterprise bargaining, in breach of the Fair Work Act 2009; the High Court of Australia unanimously dismissed Qantas's appeal in 2023. In 2025, the Federal Court of Australia imposed an A$90 million penalty, in addition to an A$120 million compensation settlement with the former employees.

=== Business process outsourcing ===
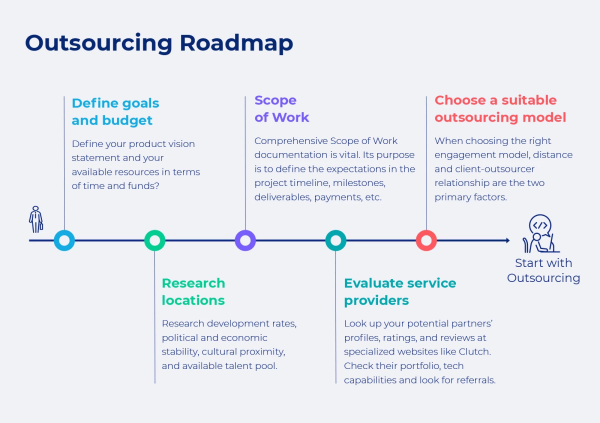
Outsourcing roadmap

Business process outsourcing (BPO) is a subset of outsourcing that involves the contracting of the operations and responsibilities of a specific business process to a third-party service provider. Originally, this was associated with manufacturing firms, such as Coca-Cola that outsourced large segments of its supply chain.

BPO is typically categorized into back office and front office outsourcing.

BPO can be offshore outsourcing, near-shore outsourcing to a nearby country, or onshore outsourcing to the same country. Information technology-enabled service (ITES-BPO), knowledge process outsourcing (KPO) and legal process outsourcing (LPO), a.k.a. legal outsourcing, are some of the sub-segments of BPO.

Although BPO began as a cost-reducer, changes (specifically the move to more service-based rather than product-based contracts), companies now choose to outsource their back-office increasingly for time flexibility and direct quality control. Business process outsourcing enhances the flexibility of an organization in different ways:

BPO vendor charges are project-based or fee-for-service, using business models such as remote in-sourcing or similar software development and outsourcing models. This can help a company to become more flexible by transforming fixed into variable costs. A variable cost structure helps a company responding to changes in required capacity and does not require a company to invest in assets, thereby making the company more flexible.

BPO also permits focusing on a company's core competencies.

Supply chain management with effective use of supply chain partners and business process outsourcing can increase the speed of several business processes.

==== BPO caveats ====
Even various contractual compensation strategies may leave the company as having a new "single point of failure" (where even an after the fact payment is not enough to offset "complete failure of the customer's business"). Unclear contractual issues are not the only risks; there's also changing requirements and unforeseen charges, failure to meet service levels, and a dependence on the BPO which reduces flexibility. The latter is called lock-in; flexibility may be lost due to penalty clauses and other contract terms. Also, the selection criteria may seem vague and undifferentiated.

Security risks can arise regarding both from physical communication and from a privacy perspective. Employee attitude may change, and the company risks losing independence.

Risks and threats of outsourcing must therefore be managed, to achieve any benefits. In order to manage outsourcing in a structured way, maximizing positive outcome, minimizing risks and avoiding any threats, a business continuity management (BCM) model is set up. BCM consists of a set of steps, to successfully identify, manage and control the business processes that are, or can be outsourced.

Analytic hierarchy process (AHP) is a framework of BPO focused on identifying potential outsourceable information systems. L. Willcocks, M. Lacity and G. Fitzgerald identify several contracting problems companies face, ranging from unclear contract formatting, to a lack of understanding of technical IT processes.

==== Technological pressures ====
Industry analysts have identified robotic process automation (RPA) software and in particular the enhanced self-guided RPAAI based on artificial intelligence as a potential threat to the industry and speculate as to the likely long-term impact. In the short term, however, there is likely to be little impact as existing contracts run their course: it is only reasonable to expect demand for cost efficiency and innovation to result in transformative changes at the point of contract renewals. With the average length of a BPO contract being 5 years or more – and many contracts being longer – this hypothesis will take some time to play out.

On the other hand, an academic study by the London School of Economics was at pains to counter the so-called 'myth' that RPA will bring back many jobs from offshore. One possible argument behind such an assertion is that new technology provides new opportunities for increased quality, reliability, scalability and cost control, thus enabling BPO providers to increasingly compete on an outcomes-based model rather than competing on cost alone. With the core offering potentially changing from a "lift and shift" approach based on fixed costs to a more qualitative, service based and outcomes-based model, there is perhaps a new opportunity to grow the BPO industry with a new offering.

==== Industry size ====
One estimate of the worldwide BPO market from the BPO Services Global Industry Almanac 2017, puts the size of the industry in 2016 at about US$140 billion.

India, China and the Philippines are major powerhouses in the industry. In 2017, in India, the BPO industry generated US$30 billion in revenue according to the national industry association. The BPO industry is a small segment of the total outsourcing industry in India. The BPO industry workforce in India is expected to shrink by 14% in 2021.

The BPO industry and IT services industry in combination are worth a total of US$154 billion in revenue in 2017. The BPO industry in the Philippines generated $26.7 billion in revenues in 2020, while around 700 thousand medium and high skill jobs would be created by 2022.

In 2015, official statistics put the size of the total outsourcing industry in China, including not only the BPO industry but also IT outsourcing services, at $130.9 billion.

=== Print and mail outsourcing ===
Print and mail outsourcing is the outsourcing of document printing and distribution.

The Print Services & Distribution Association was formed in 1946, and its members provide services that today might involve the word outsource. Similarly, members of the Direct Mail Marketing Association (established 1917) were the "outsourcers" for advertising agencies and others doing mailings.

The term "outsourcing" became very common in the print and mail business during the 1990s, and later expanded to be very broad and inclusive of most any process by 2000. Today, there are web based print to mail solutions for small to mid-size companies which allow the user to send one to thousands of documents into the mail stream, directly from a desktop or web interface.

=== Marketing outsourcing ===
The term outsource marketing has been used in Britain to mean the outsourcing of the marketing function. The motivation for this has been:

- cost reduction
- specialized expertise
- speed of execution
- short term staff augmentation

While much of this work is the "bread and butter" of specialized departments within advertising agencies, sometimes specialist are used, such as when The Guardian outsourced most of its marketing design in May 2010.

== Related ==
- Offshoring – moving work to another country. If the offshore workplace is a foreign subsidiary, owned by the company, then the offshore operation is a § captive, sometimes referred to as in-house offshore.
- Offshore outsourcing – combines outsourcing and offshoring; is the practice of hiring an external organization that is in another country to perform a business function.
- In-housing – hiring employees or using existing employees/resources to undo an outsourcing.
- Insourcing – the opposite of outsourcing: bringing a process handled by third-party firm in-house, which is sometimes accomplished via vertical integration.
- Farmshoring – outsourcing to companies in more rural locations within the same country.
- Homeshoring a.k.a. homesourcing – a form of IT-enabled offshoring; "transfer of service industry employment from offices to home-based ... with appropriate telephone and Internet facilities". These remote work positions may be customer-facing or back office, and the workers may be employees or independent contractors.
- Friendshoring – developing supply chain networks with allies and friendly countries.
- An intermediary – a business which provides a contract service to another organization while contracting out that same service.

== See also ==
- Banking BPO services
- Business process outsourcing in China – Business process outsourcing industry in China
- Business process outsourcing in the Philippines – Overview of the process of outsourcing of various business processes
- Business process outsourcing to India – Outsourcing industry based in India
- Call center industry in Bangladesh
- Call center industry in the Philippines
- Collaboration – Act of working together
- Contingent workforce – Non-permanent type of employment
- Contract manufacturer – Company that manufactures items for other companies
- Facilities management – Interdisciplinary field
- Freelance marketplace – Self-employed worker with no committed employer
- Friendshoring – Supply chain concept
- Global labor arbitrage – Shift of jobs to more inexpensive nations
- Global sourcing – Sourcing from the global market for goods and services across geopolitical boundaries
- Globality – View of the world as a single place
- Globally integrated enterprise – Organisational theory term
- Licensed production – Production under license of technology developed elsewhere
- Moral outsourcing – Ethical decision-making process
- Offshore custom software development
- Offshoring Research Network
- Outsourced document processing – Digitalisation of analog documents
- Outstaffing – Type of outsourcing company
- Professional Employer Organization – Type of outsourcing company
- Recruitment – Process of attracting and selecting candidates for a job
- Selfsourcing – Practice of serving oneself when shopping or getting services
- Software testing outsourcing
- Telecentre – Public place where people can access digital technologies
- Theory of the firm#Economic theory of outsourcing – Theories relating to firms' roles in the economy
- Virtual assistance
