= Banking BPO services =

Banking business process outsourcing or banking BPO is a highly specialized sourcing strategy employed by banks and lending institutions to facilitate the business acquisition and account servicing activities linked with the customer lending lifecycle. These specific BPO services are usually offered through multi-year service-level agreements for all or portions of the credit card lending, consumer lending, or commercial lending segments of the financial services market. Some larger financial services organizations choose to extend their sourcing strategy to include other outsourced services such as ITO systems and software, human resources outsourcing and benefits services, finance and accounting outsourcing (FAO) services, procurement outsourcing, and training outsourcing.

Banking BPO services are typically defined by industry analysts, advisors, and leaders in the sourcing industry as the set of discrete processes or transactional activities that support the lending lifecycle as follows:

- New customer acquisition services include telemarketing activities, application processing, underwriting, customer or merchant credit evaluation and verification, credit approval, document processing, account opening, customer care, and on-boarding.
- Account servicing processes for credit cards or consumer loans. These most commonly include payment processing systems and services, customer service or call center support operations (voice, digital, email, and mail services), product renewals, and loan disbursement; document management services such as printing and mailing of statements, networked printing, and storage solutions; collections, recoveries processing, default management, risk management, and foreclosure.
- Consumer and commercial lending post-origination transaction processing services, such as check processing, clearance and settlement services, remittance, and records management.
- Back-office transaction process management for loans or credit card portfolios, including custody services, fraud mitigation and detection, regulatory and program management compliance, portfolio analytics, reporting, conversions, management of technology platforms, interfaces for customer data, and custom development.
