= Friendshoring =

Supply chain concept

Friendshoring, or allyshoring, is the transfer of manufacturing and sourcing to countries that are geopolitical allies, such as members of the same trade bloc or military alliance. Some companies and governments have pursued friendshoring as a means to continue accessing international markets and supply chains while reducing geopolitical risks. However, friendshoring can also have downsides, including more expensive manufacturing and reduced economic output.

== Origin ==
Bonnie Glick first used the term "allied shoring" at the start of the COVID-19 pandemic while she was serving as the Deputy Administrator of the United States Agency for International Development. In June 2021, the term "ally-shoring" was used in an article by the Brookings Institution.

In April 2022, Treasury Secretary Janet Yellen used the term "friend-shoring" in one of her speeches, and the White House mentioned "ally and friendshoring" in a June 2022 report on resilient supply chains.

== Shift in U.S. trade policy ==
Recent U.S. trade policy initiatives, including the Agreement between the United States of America, the United Mexican States, and Canada (USMCA) and the Indo-Pacific Economic Framework (IPEF), have incorporated friendshoring arrangements. In November 2022, Bank of America released a research report authored by Carlos Capistrán (its Head of Canada and Mexico Economics) stating that the policy shift represented a "lifetime opportunity" for Mexico, and in the same month Raquel Buenrostro Sánchez, Mexico's economy minister, welcomed the prospects of 400 North American companies transferring their Asian operations into Mexico. Already, by 2023, Mexico had replaced China as the biggest producer of goods exported to the United States.

== Advantages ==
=== Geopolitics ===
Friendshoring can help mitigate supply chain risk stemming from geopolitical tensions with countries which exert full control over the flow of important materials. When appropriately balanced with reshoring, friendshoring can promote supply chain resilience.

Friendshoring also makes supply chains more reliable by reducing dependencies on countries that are not allies. For example, companies operating in China experienced substantial interruptions due to its zero-COVID policy. Additionally, global supply chains have been thrown into disarray since Russia's invasion of Ukraine in 2022.

=== Efficiency ===
Whenever onshoring is infeasible, friendshoring can be a useful practice to maintain offshore operations but also mitigate risk, such as in the case of materials like lithium which are only available in specific parts of the world and thus cannot be onshored.

Friendshoring can also be practical by tapping into complex, mature supply chains that are already developed for a particular supply or service, rather than attempting to onshore with entirely new supply chain. For example, in the automotive industry, finished goods often require the trade of intermediate goods with other countries. In such a case, friendshoring may be more feasible than onshoring in terms of cost and logistics.

== Disadvantages ==
=== Growth ===
Friendshoring can potentially lead to more expensive products if countries depart from areas with low production costs. Economists have also suggested that friendshoring can potentially lead to supply shocks and lower growth over time.

Raghuram Rajan, former governor of the Reserve Bank of India, is critical of friendshoring, voicing concerns about its impact on global free and fair trade. He argued that in a friendshoring model, a developing country could be denied beneficial opportunities simply due to its misalignment of values with other countries. For example, many developing countries have not adopted the U.S. sanctions on Russia after its invasion of Ukraine in order to avoid reducing trade. If such a stance disqualifies them from being considered a friend or ally of the U.S., then they could lose economic opportunity from the U.S. due to a friendshoring model.

The International Monetary Fund (IMF) has warned that friendshoring can lead to reduced economic growth. Specifically, it estimates that trade barriers associated with friendshoring could lead to a 2% decrease in global economic output, an impact that would spread unevenly across different countries. In an IMF simulation, friendshoring would lead to a drop of less than 1% of U.S. GDP but as much as a 6% drop in other countries. Emerging markets in Asia outside of China would be the most vulnerable to the consequences of friendshoring. The IMF also found that friendshoring may cause economic risks to be less diversified, potentially causing more economic downturns. Similarly, the World Trade Organization estimates that global production would reduce by 5% if friendshoring results in a divide between the east and west trading blocs.

=== Practicality ===
One difficulty of friendshoring involves the definition of a friend or an ally. In some cases, a military ally can also be a strong economic competitor. Furthermore, a country's status as a friend or ally can change over time. Such fluidity can make it difficult for companies or countries to make long-term decisions, such as friendshoring, based on these designations.

Some argue that moving business out of a non-allied country due to a lack of shared values does not necessarily always reap the benefits of risk mitigation, supply chain resiliency, and/or reliability. If motivated for purely political reasons, the financial and supply chain impact can sometimes make friendshoring impractical.

=== Conflict ===
Some claim that while friendshoring can strengthen relations between two countries that are allies, it can conversely exacerbate tension with countries that are not considered allies and therefore denied opportunity. This can potentially lead to and/or escalate political and economic instability.

According to Hugo Dixon, friendshoring should be used as a defense mechanism rather than an attacking one. He gave the example that the U.S. should not use friendshoring to harm China's economy, which could escalate into a cold war and potentially a hot war. Rather, the U.S. should use friendshoring to protect against supply chain interruptions. In Dixon's estimation, such can be achieved by selecting strategically important products and then sourcing suppliers and increasing production in other countries instead of severing ties completely.

== See also ==
- Offshoring
- China Plus One
- Non-China supply chain
