= Physical restructuring =

Manufacturing companies often refer to their manufacturing plant transfer, consolidation and closure activities as physical restructuring. This can be done by moving production or services overseas, a process known as offshoring. Such projects began in the United States during the 1960s and by 2009 showed little sign of having ended. Such corporate behavior has taken its toll on the manufacturing base and continues to do so.

Chrysler planned a phase of physical restructuring with the sale of its "good assets" to Fiat in 2009. Pfizer has executed numerous physical restructuring programs in the years prior to 2009, as a direct result of changes in the drug pipeline and an outdated and inefficient manufacturing and distribution network. General Motors announced a large wave of physical restructuring associated with their June 2009 bankruptcy filing.

While the sell-off of assets is necessary in cases of bankruptcy, the costs associated with physical restructuring need to be managed by experts. Firms able to advise and oversee a program of physical restructuring include; PA Consulting Group, Boston Consulting Group, Bestshore Partners, AlixPartners and BOOZ and Company.
