= Global labor arbitrage =

Shift of jobs to more inexpensive nations

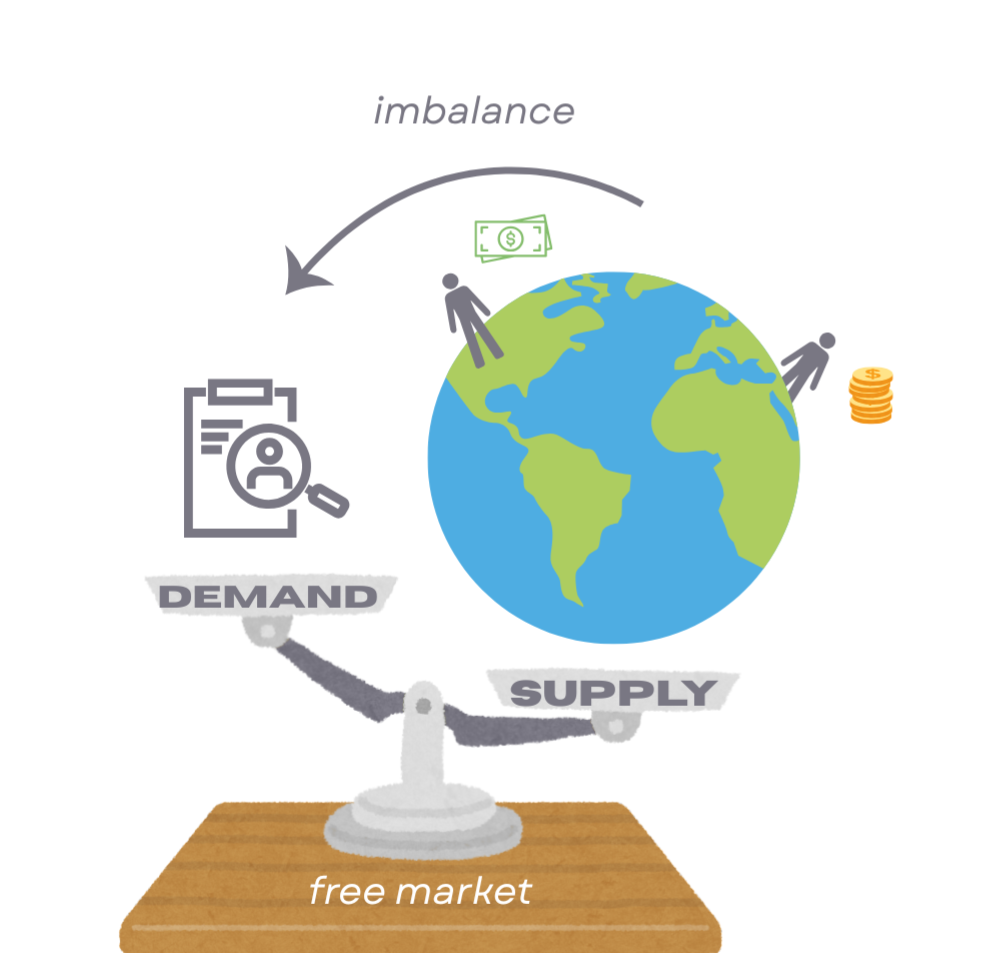
Free-market globalization increases the labor supply by integrating foreign jobseekers who often work for low wages.

Global labor arbitrage is an economic phenomenon where, as a result of the removal of or disintegration of barriers to international trade, jobs move to nations where labor and the cost of doing business (such as environmental regulations) are inexpensive and/or impoverished labor moves to nations with higher paying jobs.

Two common barriers to international trade are tariffs (politically imposed) and the costs of transporting goods across oceans. With the advent of the Internet, the decrease of the costs of telecommunications, and the possibility of near-instantaneous document transfer, the barriers to the trade of intellectual work product, which is, essentially, any kind of work that can be performed on a computer (such as computer programming) or that makes use of college education, have been greatly reduced.

Often, a prosperous nation (such as the United States) will remove its barriers to international trade, integrating its labor market with those of nations with a lower cost of labor (such as India, China, and Mexico), resulting in a shifting of jobs from the prosperous nation to the developing one. The result is an increase in the supply of labor relative to the demand for labor, which means a decrease in costs and a decrease in wages.

== Forms of global labor arbitrage ==
Global labor arbitrage can take many forms, including but not limited to:

=== Foreign outsourcing ===
Capital moves to nations with cheap labor, lower taxes and/or fewer environmental regulations or other costs of doing business for the purpose of producing goods and services for export to other markets. The classic example is the case of a factory or office closing in Nation A and then moving to Nation B for the purpose of producing goods or services at lower labor costs for export back to Nation A's market. This can result in layoffs for workers in Nation A. For example, in the United States, the amount of manufacturing jobs has decreased while the importation of manufactured goods from other nations has increased (along with the United States' trade deficit). These trends are now affecting the service sector as well.

== See also ==
- Absolute advantage
- Balance of trade
- Global workforce
- Exploitation of labour
- Low-cost country sourcing
- Offshoring
- Youth unemployment
