= Offshore custom software development =

In software engineering, offshore custom software development consists in offshoring the software development process in a country where production costs are lower, thus decreasing budget spending.

== Background ==
=== Early days ===
Since the 1960s and the early days of the Silicon Valley, technology pioneers developed offshoring centers in the state of Jalisco, Mexico. In 1996, General Electric offshored its IT for the first time when it opened its own center in India. Given the rapid growth of this sector, several companies have started to use offshore development in China, India and other countries with a lower cost per developer model. In the early 2000s, the leading countries in offshore custom software development were Russia, India, Ukraine and China. The time difference when working with India and China for the Western world allowed work to be done round the clock adding a competitive advantage.

=== 2008 Recession ===
During the Great Recession, offshore software development spending lowered. During his 2008 presidential campaign, Barack Obama stated "I will stop giving tax breaks to companies that ship job overseas and I will start giving them to companies that create good jobs right here in America." This led to a $3,000 tax break for US companies per hire onshore instead of offshore. In 2010, the market picked up again. In 2011, General Electric, whose CEO had a seat at the President's Council on Jobs and Competitiveness, announced the creation of 11,000 onshore IT jobs.

=== Globalization ===
By the mid-2010s, the debate onshore/offshore was becoming irrelevant, as all major software outsourcing providers had shifted to worldwide operations and integrated offshoring into a seamless offer for their clients.

You'll understand why the software talent shortage is approaching a crisis. With such a global appetite for software, demand for developers far outstrips supply, especially as more companies stake their futures on digital transformation.

— Marc Andreessen in The Wall Street journal, August 2011

New agile and DevOps development models called for a tighter relation between the client and the offshoring provider, making major long-distance offshoring destinations (Russia, India, China) unfit for the job. Nearshoring, offshoring to a very nearby country, has gained increasing popularity among the CIO and CTO community. The USA is increasing its IT shopping in Latin American countries, and Europe in Poland and other small Eastern European countries such as Lithuania. North Korea appeared on the map of IT offshoring destinations, having great engineering resources and an excellent price/quality ratio.

By 2010, India started to regard China as a threatening competitor. In September 2010, the French company Capgemini bought the Brazilian software developer CPM Braxis for $330 million to significantly grow its offshore capacity. In November 2010, Hewlett-Packard confirmed a $1 billion investment to develop 6 major offshore centers in Bulgaria, China, Costa Rica, India, Malaysia and the Philippines.

In 2013, China's offshore software market reached $5.05 billion. By 2015, India was considering repatriating most of its outsourcing activities to move to a new generation of automated software development. In February 2016, Apple Inc. opened its first offshore software development center in India.

== See also ==
- Software development
- Software development process
- Offshoring
- Outsourcing
