= Globality =

View of the world as a single place

Globality is the consciousness of the world as a single place. The concept of globality was introduced in the social sciences by British sociologist Roland Robertson. It signifies the spreading and deepening consciousness of the world-as-a-whole and could thus be considered the phenomenological aspect of globalization, which Robertson defined as "the compression of the world and the intensification of consciousness of the world as a whole" (Robertson 1992, p. 34).

Earlier definitions of globality referred to the quality of being global or universal. With Robertson, globality acquires a specific scientific definition.

== Globality in business studies ==
Pundits like Daniel Yergin now employ the concept of globality to speculate about the end-state of globalization, a hypothetical condition in which the process of globalization is complete or nearly so, barriers have fallen, and "a new global reality" is emerging.

The current use of “globality” in business studies – as a description of the current competitive state of world commerce – was not adopted until recently. The book: Globality: Competing with Everyone from Everywhere for Everything, Hal Sirkin Jim Hemerling Arindam Bhattacharya June 11, 2008, elaborates on how 'challenger' businesses from rapidly developing economies abroad are aggressively and inventively overtaking existing 'incumbent' nations.

According to Sirkin et al. (2008), globality has three main features as it applies to commerce and business:

1. A significant structural shift in the flow of commerce: companies from every part of the world are now competing with each other for “everything” – customers, suppliers, partners, capital, intellectual property, raw materials, distribution systems, manufacturing capabilities, and most important, talent. In this competitive free-for-all, products and services flow from many locations to many destinations.
2. A breakdown in the established hierarchy of commercial power and influence: power is shifting away from traditional centers of influence in developed markets in the United States, Europe, and Japan, as companies from rapidly developing economies (RDEs) are quickly assuming leadership positions in global markets, forcing established leaders to compete on new terms.
3. The emergence of new business and governance practices better suited to a truly global and decentralized business environment. To compete successfully in a world of globality, established industry leaders from developed markets are being forced to learn from competitors in developing markets. The practices include shifting autonomy and decision making outward to satellite operations; redeploying assets to build commerce within emerging regions; and expanding quickly into new markets to match the speed and scale with which challengers are rising.

== See also ==
- Globalization
- Roland Robertson
- Cosmopolitanism
- Global citizenship
- The World Is Flat

== Bibliography ==
- Robertson, Roland (1992). Globalization: Social Theory and Global Culture. London, Thousand Oaks, New Delhi: Sage.
- Sirkin, Harold L.; Hemerling, James W.; Bhattacharya, Arindam K; with John Butman (2008). Globality: Competing with Everyone from Everywhere for Everything. New York: Business Plus: ISBN 0-446-17829-2
- Yergin, Daniel; Stanislaw, Joseph (2002). The Commanding Heights: The Battle for the World Economy. New York: Simon & Schuster: ISBN 978-0-684-83569-3
