= 1983 New Year Honours =

British royal recognitions

The New Year Honours 1983 were appointments by most of the Commonwealth realms of Queen Elizabeth II to various orders and honours to reward and highlight good works by citizens of those countries, and honorary ones to citizens of other countries. They were announced on 31 December 1982 to celebrate the year passed and mark the beginning of 1983 in the United Kingdom, Australia, New Zealand and Cook Islands, the Bahamas, Fiji, Papua New Guinea, Solomon Islands, Tuvalu, St. Lucia, St. Vincent & Grenadines, and Antigua & Barbuda.

The recipients of honours are displayed here as they were styled before their new honour, and arranged by honour, with classes (Knight, Knight Grand Cross, etc.) and then divisions (Military, Civil, etc.) as appropriate.

== United Kingdom and Commonwealth ==
=== Baron ===
Life Peers

- Marshal of the Royal Air Force Sir Neil Cameron, GCB, CBE, DSO, DFC, AE, Principal of King's College, London.
- Sir Derek Ezra, MBE. Lately Chairman, National Coal Board.
- Sir Derek George Rayner, Joint Vice Chairman, Marks & Spencer plc. Adviser to the Prime Minister on efficiency in Government.
- The Right Honourable Gordon William Humphreys Douglas Richardson, MBE, TD. Governor, Bank of England.

=== Privy Counsellor ===
- John Julian Ganzoni, Baron Belstead. Minister of State, Foreign and Commonwealth Office.
- Sir Ian Percival, QC, MP, Solicitor General. Member of Parliament for Southport.
- The Honourable Nicholas Ridley, MP. Financial Secretary to the Treasury. Member of Parliament for Cirencester and Tewkesbury.

=== Knight Bachelor ===
- Robert Atkinson, DSC, RD, Chairman, British Shipbuilders.
- Brian Harry Bailey, OBE, Chairman, South West Regional Health Authority.
- The Honourable John Francis Harcourt Baring, CVO, Chairman, Baring Brothers & Co. Ltd.
- Christopher Charles Booth, Director, Medical Research Council, Clinical Research Centre.
- Douglas Denison Brown. For political service.
- Austin Wyeth Bunch, CBE, Chairman, The Electricity Council.
- Clifford Charles Butler, Vice-Chancellor, Loughborough University of Technology. For services to Science Education.
- Wilfred Halliday Cockcroft. For services to Education.
- Terence Orby Conran, Chairman, Habitat/Mothercare plc.
- James Carlisle Stormonth Darling, CBE, MC, TD, Director, The National Trust for Scotland.
- William Barr McKinnon Duncan, CBE, Deputy Chairman, Imperial Chemical Industries plc.
- Sidney Alfred William Eburne, MC, Chairman and Senior Crown Agent.
- Leslie Fletcher, DSC. For political and public service.
- Edward Lucas Gardner, QC, MP. For political and public service.
- John Anthony Grant, MP. For political and public service.
- John Peter Grenside, CBE, Senior Partner, Peat Marwick Mitchell & Company.
- Harold George Hillier, CBE. For services to horticulture and for charitable services.
- Michael Murray Hordern, CBE, Actor.
- David William Stennis Stuart Lane, lately Chairman, Commission for Racial Equality.
- Kenneth Lewis, DL, MP. For political and public service.
- Norman Somerville Macfarlane, Chairman and Managing Director, Macfarlane Group (Clansman) plc, and for services to industry and the Arts.
- John David Nunes Nabarro, Chairman of the Joint Consultants' Committee. Lately Consultant Physician, Middlesex Hospital.
- Edward Walter Parkes, Chairman, University Grants Committee.
- David Towry Piper, CBE. For services to Art.
- John Michael Pritchard, CBE, Conductor.
- The Right Honourable Kenneth Robinson. For services to the Arts.
- Dudley Gordon Smith, MP. For political and public service.
- Theodore Morris Sugden, CBE, Master of Trinity Hall, University of Cambridge. Physical Secretary, The Royal Society.
- John Meredith Temple, DL. For political and public service.
- Adam Thomson, CBE, Chairman and Chief Executive, Caledonian Aviation Group plc.
- Frederick Donald Walters. For political and public service.

Australian States

State of Queensland

- Raymond Douglas Logan. For service to the cattle industry and the community.

State of Western Australia

- James Alexander McCusker. For service to building societies.

=== Order of the Bath ===
==== Knight Grand Cross of the Order of the Bath (GCB) ====
Military Division

Royal Navy

- Admiral Sir Arthur Desmond Cassidi, KCB.

Army

- General Sir Michael Gow, KCB, ADC (Gen.) (278637), late Scots Guards, Colonel Commandant Intelligence Corps.

Royal Air Force

- Air Chief Marshal Sir Peter Terry, KCB, AFC.

Civil Division

- Sir Robert Temple Armstrong, KCB, CVO, Secretary of the Cabinet. Joint Head of the Home Civil Service.

==== Knight Commander of the Order of the Bath (KCB) ====
Military Division

- Vice Admiral Peter Geoffrey Marshall Herbert, OBE.
- Vice Admiral James Edward Campbell Kennon, CBE.
- Lieutenant General Richard Maurice Hilton Vickers, MVO, OBE, (400100), late The Blues and Royals (Royal Horse Guards and 1st Dragoons).
- Acting Air Marshal Peter Robin Harding, CB, Royal Air Force.

Civil Division

- John Lewis Jones, CMG, attached Ministry of Defence.
- Michael James Kerry, CB, HM Procurator General and Treasury Solicitor.
- Philip John Woodfield, CB, CBE, Permanent Under-Secretary of State, Northern Ireland Office.

==== Companion of the Order of the Bath (CB) ====
Military Division

Royal Navy

- Rear Admiral David John Mackenzie.
- Major General John Frederick Mottram, MVO, OBE.
- Rear Admiral Derek O'Hara.
- Rear Admiral Trevor Owen Keith Spraggs.

Army

- Major General Archibald Cull Birtwistle, CBE, (406347), late Royal Corps of Signals.
- The Venerable Archdeacon William Francis Johnston, QHC, (459970), Royal Army Chaplains' Department.
- Major General Lennox Alexander Hawkins Napier, OBE, MC, (397999), late The Royal Regiment of Wales (24th/41st Foot), Colonel Commandant Prince of Wales' Division.
- Major General George Brian Sinclair, CBE, (376979), late Corps of Royal Engineers.
- Major General Henry Michael Tillotson, CBE, (393310), Colonel The Prince of Wales's Own Regiment of Yorkshire.
- Major General Anthony John Trythall (390055), late Royal Army Educational Corps.

Royal Air Force

- Air Vice-Marshal David Frank Bates, (Retired).
- Air Vice-Marshal Joseph Alfred Gilbert, CBE.
- Air Vice-Marshal Anthony Gerald Skingsley.
- The Venerable Herbert James Stuart, QHC.

Civil Division

- Richard Herries Bird, Deputy Secretary, Department of Education and Science.
- John Niall Henderson Blelloch, Deputy Secretary, Ministry of Defence.
- John Caines, Deputy Secretary, Department of Trade.
- David Cunningham, Solicitor to the Secretary of State for Scotland.
- Ian Leonard Davies, Director, Admiralty Underwater Weapons Establishment, Ministry of Defence.
- Anthony Noble Frankland, CBE, DFC, lately Director, The Imperial War Museum.
- Charles Freedman, Under Secretary, Board of Customs and Excise.
- Peter Lewis Gregson, Deputy Secretary, Cabinet Office.
- John Ferguson Irvine, Permanent Secretary, Department of the Environment, Northern Ireland.
- Kenneth Linsdell, Under Secretary, Department of the Environment.
- Andrew Gordon Manzie, Deputy Secretary, Department of Industry.
- Peter Marchmont, Principal Assistant Solicitor, Department of Transport.
- James Nursaw, Legal Secretary, Law Officers' Department.
- Philip Redfern, Deputy Director, Office of Population Censuses and Surveys.
- Colonel Robert Charles Townsend Sivewright, MC, DL, Vice-Chairman, Council of Territorial Auxiliary and Volunteer Reserve Associations.
- Walter Gordon Mason Williams, Deputy Chief Valuer, Board of Inland Revenue.

=== Order of Saint Michael and Saint George ===
==== Knight Grand Cross of the Order of St Michael and St George (GCMG) ====
- Sir Edward Youde, KCMG, MBE, Governor and Commander-in-Chief, Hong Kong.

==== Knight Commander of the Order of St Michael and St George (KCMG) ====
- The Right Honourable Thomas Edward, Baron Bridges, CMG, Foreign and Commonwealth Office.
- Kenneth Cavendish Christofas, CMG, MBE, lately Director-General, Secretariat Council, European Community, Brussels.
- George William Harding, CMG, CVO, H.M. Ambassador, Brasilia.
- Peter Harold Reginald Marshall, CMG, United Kingdom Permanent Representative to the Office of the United Nations, Geneva.
- Robert Lucian Wade-Gery, CMG, British High Commissioner, New Delhi.

==== Companion of the Order of St Michael and St George (CMG) ====
- William Atherton Dodd, Chief Education Adviser, Overseas Development Administration.
- Kenneth Peter Jeffs, Director General (Marketing), Ministry of Defence.

Diplomatic Service and Overseas List

- Roger John Carrick, MVO, lately Counsellor, HM Embassy, Washington.
- Dr. Ronald Ian Talbot Cromartie, Leader of the United Kingdom Delegation to the Committee on Disarmament, Geneva.
- Stanley Frederick St. Clare Duncan, HM Ambassador, La Paz.
- Marrack Irvine Goulding, Counsellor, United Kingdom Mission to the United Nations, New York.
- Thomas Nivison Haining, lately HM Ambassador, Ulan Bator.
- David Neil Lane, British High Commissioner, Port of Spain.
- Christopher Duncan Lush, United Kingdom Permanent Representative-designate to the Council of Europe, Strasbourg.
- Colin Hugh Verel McColl, Foreign and Commonwealth Office.
- John Adam Robson, HM Ambassador, Bogotá.
- John Anthony Sankey, British High Commissioner, Dar es Salaam.
- Alfred Murray Simons, Head of the United Kingdom Delegation to the Negotiations on the Mutual Reduction of Forces, Vienna.
- Charles William Wallace, CVO, HM Ambassador, Lima.

Australian States

State of South Australia

- Reverend Ian Bowe Tanner. For service to the Church.

=== Royal Victorian Order ===
==== Knight Grand Cross of the Royal Victorian Order (GCVO) ====
- The Right Honourable Sir Philip Brian Cecil Moore, KCB, KCVO, CMG.

==== Knight Commander of the Royal Victorian Order (KCVO) ====
- Lieutenant Colonel Alexander Colin Cole, CVO, TD.

==== Commander of the Royal Victorian Order (CVO) ====
- The Right Honourable Virginia Fortune, Countess of Airlie.
- Michael Barclay Mavor.
- James Graham Urquhart.
- Fulke Thomas Tyndall Walwyn.
- Clive Anthony Whitmore.

==== Member of the Royal Victorian Order (MVO) ====
At this time the two lowest classes of the Royal Victorian Order were "Member (fourth class)" and "Member (fifth class)", both with post-nominal letters MVO. "Member (fourth class)" was renamed "Lieutenant" (LVO) from the 1985 New Year Honours onwards.

Fourth Class

- David Robert Collinson.
- John Martin Gregory.
- Wing Commander Eric Thomson Inglis King, Royal Air Force.
- Mary Carew Pole.
- Philip Henry Parkyns Shaw.
- Austin Denham Smith.
- Surgeon Commander David Leslie Swain, Royal Navy.
- James Douglas Thomas.
- Lieutenant Colonel Blair Aubyn Stewart-Wilson, Scots Guards.

Fifth Class

- Mavis Sylvia Eireen Belsey.
- Edward Archdale Candy.
- Richard James William Edwards.
- Dorothea Mary Patricia Malley, MBE.
- Frederick Lionel Quinby.
- Warrant Officer Bryan Keith Rawnsley (D1920363), Royal Air Force.
- Edward Arthur Sibbick, BEM.
- Major Ernest Smith.
- Michael James Robert Stroud.
- Muriel Wood.

==== Medal of the Royal Victorian Order (RVM) ====
In Gold

- Charles Alexander Candy, RVM.

In Silver

- Montague Wallace Christopher.
- C4266189 Chief Technician Roger John Church, Royal Air Force.
- John Collings.
- Edward George Fancourt.
- Police Constable Roger Stanton Grigson, Metropolitan Police.
- Police Constable Peter Richard Howard, Metropolitan Police.
- Edmund Ambrose Lucas.
- E4253008 Chief Technician Martyn John Meredith, Royal Air Force.
- Marine Ronald George Steele, Royal Marines, P021867R.
- Maria June Tawse Webster.

Bar to the RVM in Silver

- Gladys Bell, RVM.

=== Order of the British Empire ===
==== Dame Commander of the Order of the British Empire (DBE) ====
Civil Division

- The Most Honourable Elizabeth Shirley Vaughan, Marchioness of Anglesey, CBE. For public service.
- Olga Nikolaevna Uvarov, CBE. For services to veterinary medicine.

==== Knight Commander of the Order of the British Empire (KBE) ====
Civil Division

- David Arthur Roberts, CMG, CVO, HM Ambassador, Beirut.

==== Commander of the Order of the British Empire (CBE) ====
Military Division

Royal Navy

- Captain Brian Thomas Brown.
- Matron-in-Chief Margaret Elizabeth Collins, RRC, QHNS, Queen Alexandra's Royal Naval Nursing Service.
- Commodore Robert Cameron Hastie, RD, DL, Royal Naval Reserve.
- Captain James Trevor Lord.

Army

- Colonel Colin Edward George Carrington (445814), late Royal Corps of Transport.
- Brigadier Godfrey John Curl (381805), late Royal Corps of Signals (now R.A.R.O.).
- Brigadier Peter Edgar de la Cour de la Billière, DSO, MC, (424859), late The Light Infantry.
- Colonel John Graham Evans, TD, (420391), late Corps of Royal Engineers, Territorial Army.
- Brigadier Ronald Edward Lewis Jenkins, ADC, (393710), late Royal Corps of Transport.
- Brigadier Donald Jolliffe London, OBE, ADC, (364097), late Corps of Royal Engineers.
- Brigadier Douglas Stuart Paton, MBE, QHP, (424915), late Royal Army Medical Corps.
- Colonel Nigel Maxwell Still (455626), late 17th/21st Lancers.

Royal Air Force

- Air Commodore Peter Gibbs Peacock, OBE.
- Group Captain Allan Baillie Blackley, AFC.
- Group Captain Kenneth George Hunter, OBE.
- Group Captain Andrew Lyle Roberts, AFC.

Civil Division

- Richard Borlase Adams, Chief Executive, Peninsular & Oriental Steam Navigation Company.
- David Percival Bethel, Director, Leicester Polytechnic.
- Professor Peter Gilroy Bevan, Consultant Surgeon, Dudley Road Hospital, West Birmingham Health Authority.
- John Alexander Black, Chairman, Solihull Health Authority.
- Professor Derek William Bowett, QC. For services to International Law.
- John Goodwin Campbell, Vice President, Machine Tool Trades Association. For services to Export.
- David Macbeth Moir Carey, lately Legal Secretary to the Archbishop of Canterbury.
- Janet Inglis Dick Chalmers. For political service.
- Geoffrey Charles Chouffot, MBE, Deputy Chairman, Civil Aviation Authority.
- James Robertson Cowan, OBE, Deputy Chairman, National Coal Board.
- James Crooks, Professor of Pharmacology and Therapeutics, University of Dundee.
- Geoffrey Robert Crosby, lately Director of Professional and Executive Recruitment, Department of Employment.
- John Alan Cumming, Chairman, The Building Societies Association.
- Lionel Frederick Dakers, Director, The Royal School of Church Music.
- Leonard Hurworth Dale, MBE, Chairman and Managing Director, Dale Electric International plc. For services to Export.
- Donald Watts Davies, Deputy Chief Scientific Officer, National Physical Laboratory.
- Roy Dennis Downham, lately Director of Finance, Independent Broadcasting Authority.
- Martin Robert Draper, lately Registrar, General Medical Council.
- Philip Dunleavy, OBE. For services to local government in South Glamorgan.
- Danilo Anthony Alexander Fagandini, Chairman, Specialised Organics Sector Working Party.
- James Bernard Fitzpatrick, Managing Director and Chief Executive, Mersey Docks and Harbour Company.
- Albert Edward Frost, for services to Industry and the Arts.
- Winnie Frost, OBE, (Mrs. Brothwood), Chairman, Standing Nursing and Midwifery Advisory Committee.
- John Glendinning, MBE, Assistant Secretary, Scottish Office.
- Peter Goodall, TD, Chairman and Chief Executive, Hepworth Ceramic Holdings plc. For services to Export.
- John Everard Grandidge, Chairman and Managing Director, Negretti & Zambra (Aviation) Ltd.
- Geoffrey Samuel Grantham, Chairman, Potato Marketing Board.
- Denis Everett Gray, MBE, Chairman, Central Council of Magistrates' Courts' Committees.
- Francis Gerard Guckian, DL, Chairman, Western Health and Social Services Board.
- David Hall, QPM, Chief Constable, Humberside Police.
- Eric Walter Handley, Professor of Greek, University College, London.
- (Charles) Jeremy Mawdesley Hardie, lately Deputy Chairman, Monopolies and Mergers Commission.
- William Harding, for political and public service.
- Robert Paschal Harries, DL, Chief Executive, Wiltshire County Council.
- Leonard John Hayward, Consultant, Department of Health and Social Security.
- Roy Kenneth Leonard Hill, Chairman, South West Water Authority.
- Alun Hoddinott, Professor of Music, University College, Cardiff.
- Richard Gordon Holme, for political and public service.
- Professor John Theodore Houghton, Director, Appleton, Science and Engineering Research Council.
- John Morrison Hunter, Master (Bankruptcy), Supreme Court of Northern Ireland.
- Michael William Ivens, for political and public service.
- John Derek Ivins, Professor of Agriculture, University of Nottingham.
- Edward Oliver Jackson, Assistant Solicitor, Board of Inland Revenue.
- John Knowelden, Professor of Community Medicine, University of Sheffield.
- Richard James Knowlton, QFSM, Firemaster, Strathclyde Fire Brigade.
- John Bathgate Knox, Chairman, Tayside Area Health Board.
- Ralph Koltai, Theatrical Designer.
- Henry Justus Kroch, OBE, Chairman and Chief Executive, AB Electronic Products Group plc.
- John Trend Lacy, for political service.
- Professor László Lajtha, Director, Paterson Laboratories, Christie Hospital and Holt Radium Institute, Manchester.
- John Patrick Grosvenor Lawrence, for political service.
- Richard Maitland Laws, Director, British Antarctic Survey.
- George Ronald Lewin, Military Historian.
- David Walter Llewellyn, Chairman, Building Regulations Advisory Committee.
- Brian Beynon Lloyd, Chairman, Health Education Council.
- Alan Frederick Longworth, Assistant Secretary, Ministry of Agriculture, Fisheries and Food.
- Professor Philip Noel Love, lately President, The Law Society of Scotland.
- John Roger Lovill, Chairman, Local Authorities Conditions of Service Advisory Board.
- Ian McColl, lately Chairman, Scottish Express Newspapers.
- Sir Nevil John Wilfred MacReady,Bt., Managing Director, Mobil Oil Co. Ltd.
- (Francis) George Mann, DSO, MC, Chairman, Test and County Cricket Board.
- Jonathan Wolfe Miller, Actor, Author and Director.
- Alan George Newton, Company Engineering Director, Rolls-Royce Ltd.
- Roy Charles Niles, TD. For political and public service.
- Patrick John Nuttgens, Director, Leeds Polytechnic.
- Roy Chalice Orford, Managing Director, International Military Services Ltd. For services to Export.
- Ion Hunter Touchet Garnett-Orme, Chairman, St. Dunstan's.
- Norman Sidney Francis Palmer, DFC, Assistant Secretary, Department of the Environment.
- William Alexander Palmer, Chairman, Flour Milling and Baking Research Association.
- Colonel Christopher Matthew Peterson, TD, DL. For political and public service.
- David Terence Puttnam, Film Producer.
- Patrick Vaughan Radford, MC, TD. For political service.
- James Deans Rankin, Chief Inspector, Cruelty to Animals Act Inspectorate, Home Office.
- Anne Theresa, Lady Ricketts, Chairman, National Association of Citizens' Advice Bureaux.
- James Ring, Professor of Physics, Imperial College of Science and Technology.
- Clifford Alan Rose, Member, British Railways Board.
- Hutchinson Burt Sneddon, OBE. For public service in Scotland.
- Ronald James South, Principal, The City Literary Institute.
- Nora MacLaren Spensley. For political service.
- Professor Robert Walter Steel, lately Principal, University College of Swansea.
- Lieutenant-Colonel Robert Christie Stewart, TD, Chairman, East of Scotland College of Agriculture.
- John Tatlock, MBE, Assistant Managing Director, British Nuclear Fuels Ltd.
- Captain Laurence William Howson Taylor, Royal Navy (Retd.), lately Director of Marine Services (Naval), Ministry of Defence.
- Alfred Caleb Victor Telling. For political service.
- George Frederick Thomason, Professor of Industrial Relations, University College, Cardiff.
- Jack Vennart, lately Director, Medical Research Council Radiobiology Unit, Harwell.
- John Kenneth Warburton, Director, Birmingham Chamber of Industry and Commerce. For services to Export.
- Bronson Patricia Rose Ward, Director, Crewe and Alsager College of Higher Education, Cheshire.
- Michael Phelps Ward. For services to Mountaineering.
- Roy William Watson, Director General, National Farmers' Union.
- Thomas Weatherby, Chairman, Textiles and other Manufactures Research and Development Requirements Board.
- Eric Frederick Webster, MBE, lately Assistant Secretary, Paymaster General's Office.
- Professor John Edward Clement Twarowski White, lately Chairman, Reviewing Committee on the Export of Works of Art.
- Stuart Leonard Whiteley, QPM, Chief Constable, Suffolk Constabulary.
- John Charles Willmott, Professor of Physics and Director of the Physical Laboratories, University of Manchester.
- Ian Clark Wood, Chairman and Managing Director, John Wood Group plc.
- Professor George Peter Youngman, Landscape Architect.

Diplomatic Service and Overseas List

- Joseph Anthony Barnett, OBE, Representative, British Council, Brazil.
- Maurice Bryan Eaden, HM Consul-General, Amsterdam.
- John Linden Lee. For services to British commercial interests in Australia.
- Donald Poon-huai Liao, OBE, Secretary for Housing, Hong Kong.
- Myles Falkiner Minchin, lately Chief of Secretariat Services Division, United Nations Organisation, New York.
- William Stewart Stewart. For services to British interests in Kuwait.
- Alex Shu-chin Wu, OBE. For public services in Hong Kong.

Australian States

State of Queensland

- John Thomas Delaney. For service to racing.
- William Edward Meynink. For service to the grazing industry.

State of South Australia

- William Faulding Scammell. For service to the pharmaceutical industry and the community.

State of Tasmania

- Eric William Beattie. For political and community service.

==== Officer of the Order of the British Empire (OBE) ====
Military Division

Royal Navy

- Commander (Acting Captain) Albert Eric Allen.
- Commander Norman Alastair Bourne Anson.
- Commander Christopher Ellis Baker.
- Commander Richard John Campbell.
- Surgeon Commander Charles William Chapman.
- Commander Geoffrey Stuart Cryer.
- Commander Ralph Edwin Hoskin.
- Commander Eric Marshall.
- Commander Mesod Isaac Massias, RD, Royal Naval Reserve.
- Major Timothy Aleyne Sanders, Royal Marines.
- Chief Officer Olive Valerie Thomas, Women's Royal Naval Service.

Army

- Lieutenant Colonel (Quartermaster) Edward Colligan (485617), Royal Horse Artillery.
- Lieutenant Colonel Samuel Cowan (474845), Royal Corps of Signals.
- Lieutenant Colonel (Ordnance Executive Officer) Ronald Leslie Davies (482351), Royal Army Ordnance Corps (now R.A.R.O.).
- Lieutenant Colonel (Quartermaster) Elsie Joyce Edwards (483715), Women's Royal Army Corps.
- Lieutenant Colonel Jonathan Charles Vivian Hunt, TD, (474169), The Royal Yeomanry, Territorial Army.
- Lieutenant Colonel David Thomas Kinnear (459986), Royal Corps of Transport.
- Lieutenant Colonel Graham Malcolm Longdon, MBE, (459291), The Prince of Wales's Own Regiment of Yorkshire.
- Lieutenant Colonel (now Colonel) David Falcon Mallam, MBE, (455060), Army Air Corps.
- Lieutenant Colonel Francis Edward William Martin (467600), The Parachute Regiment.
- Lieutenant Colonel Colin Newby (470441), Royal Army Ordnance Corps.
- Lieutenant Colonel John Rayner James Nicholls (437130), Royal Regiment of Artillery.
- Lieutenant Colonel Maurice Joseph Mary O'Dea (449023), Royal Army Ordnance Corps.
- Lieutenant Colonel Thomas Christopher Sherry, MBE, (462723), Royal Army Educational Corps.
- Acting Colonel Stanley Hume Sobey (452833), Army Cadet Force, Territorial Army.
- Acting Lieutenant Colonel Clifford Eric Taber (395571), Army Cadet Force, Territorial Army.
- Lieutenant Colonel Christopher Brooke Quentin Wallace, MBE, (472644), The Royal Green Jackets.
- Lieutenant Colonel George Somerville Welch, TD, (489723), Royal Army Medical Corps, Territorial Army.
- Lieutenant Colonel (now Colonel) John Finlay Willasey Wilsey, (461522), The Devonshire and Dorset Regiment.

Royal Air Force

- Acting Group Captain Philip Gathorne Gibson, MBE, (660230), RAF Regiment.
- Wing Commander Robin Chambers (3514359).
- Wing Commander Simon John Coy (608528).
- Wing Commander Geoffrey Eaton Culpitt (4158653).
- Wing Commander (now Group Captain) Sidney Albert Edwards (607641).
- Wing Commander John Gerald Lumsden (608160).
- Wing Commander Brian John Marks (5020376).
- Wing Commander Robert Peter O'Brien (608178).
- Wing Commander John David O'Dwyer-Russell (2461166), RAF Regiment.
- Wing Commander Ronald Anthony Slade (2557583), Royal Air Force Volunteer Reserve (Training).
- Squadron Leader Ronald William Haddow, AFM, (4149473).

Civil Division

- Janet Muir Addison. For political service.
- John Bernard Ainslie. For political and public service.
- William Lauchlan Armstrong, Deputy Director and Secretary, Scottish Engineering Employers' Association.
- Clifford Ashall, lately Assistant Director, Centre for Overseas Pest Research, Overseas Development Administration.
- William Gordon Ayling, Secretary, Argyll and Clyde Health Board.
- Anthony Granville Babbage, Director of Housing, London Borough of Hammersmith and Fulham.
- Noel Ernest Barker. For political service.
- Captain Arthur Henry Barton, Royal Navy (Retd.), Chairman, Northern Ireland UNESCO Committee.
- Commander Peter Bryan Beazley, Royal Navy (Retd.), Naval Assistant to Hydrographer, Ministry of Defence.
- Arnold Heyworth Beckett, Professor of Pharmacy, Chelsea College, University of London.
- Alan Abraham Benjamin, Director of Communications, CAP Group Ltd. For services to Export.
- Geoffrey John Bennett, Deputy Managing Director, Racal Tacticom Ltd. For services to Export.
- Rodney Hewson Bennett. For services to the community in Hereford and Worcester.
- Marcus Hugh Crofton Binney. For services to Building Conservation.
- James Davidson Boyd, lately Curator, Dundee Museums and Art Galleries.
- Elizabeth Johnston Eccles Bradley, Chairman, Rochdale Family Practitioner Committee.
- Muriel Brain, General Secretary, National Federation of the Blind of the United Kingdom.
- Geoffrey Broome, Chief Executive, Hops Marketing Board Ltd.
- Harry Gwynne Brown, lately Principal, Department of Health and Social Security.
- John Burnip Browning, lately Headmaster, Heartsease Comprehensive School, Norwich.
- Thomas Bryans, MBE, Chief General Manager, Trustee Savings Bank Central Board.
- Thomas Ferrier Burns, lately Editor, The Tablet.
- John Graham Butlin, Director, Shoe and Allied Trades Research Association.
- David Charles Butts, Governor, Scottish Council for Educational Technology.
- Max Bygraves (Walter William Bygraves), Entertainer.
- William Arthur Cadman. For services to Wildlife Conservation.
- Professor Thomas Francis Carbery, Deputy Chairman, Scottish Consumer Council.
- Albert Kenneth Carsley, Lately Headmaster, Bexton County Junior School, Knutsford, Cheshire.
- William Fisher Hunter Carson. For services to Horse Racing.
- Angela Heathcote Clarke. For political service.
- Eric James Cockell, lately Chief Auditor, Exchequer and Audit Department.
- Commander Francis William Collins, Royal Navy (Retd.). For services to Sport, particularly the Torch Trophy Trust.
- John Augustine Collins, Director of Manufacturing Technology, Domestic Appliance Division, TI Group plc.
- David Henry Conville, Managing and Artistic Director, Open Air Theatre, Regents Park.
- Cyril Edwin Cox, Reader in Education, University of London Institute of Education.
- Jeanne Margaret Currie, Secretary, Association of Educational Psychologists.
- Joseph David. For services to the British Standards Institution.
- David Tom Davies, MM. For services to local government in Dyfed.
- Robert Davis, Deputy Chairman, Central Arbitration Committee, General Workers' Group, Transport and General Workers' Union.
- Robin Henry Day, Design Consultant, Hille International Ltd.
- Captain Stanley Wilson Dean, lately Captain and Commodore of Fleet, Shell Tankers (UK) Ltd.
- William Henry Deane, Superintending Planning Officer, Department of the Environment.
- Denis Aufrere Stanley de Freitas, Chairman, British Copyright Council.
- David Dick, Chairman, Fire Services Examination Board (Scotland).
- Professor Kenneth William Donald, DSC. For services to underwater safety.
- William Anderson Donaldson, Professor and Head of Department of Operational Research, University of Strathclyde.
- Pamela Elwes Dunbar. For political service.
- Gerald Malcolm Durrell, Director, Jersey Wildlife Preservation Trust.
- David Ernest Evans. For political service.
- William Geraint Evans, Assistant Editor, The Royal Society.
- Tom William Fisher, District Nursing Officer, Tameside and Glossop Health Authority.
- David Jocelyn Fishlock, Science Editor, Financial Times.
- Patrick Joseph Flynn, QPM, lately Deputy Assistant Commissioner, Metropolitan Police.
- Lilian Joan Mary Fox, Principal Establishment Officer, London H.Q. UK Atomic Energy Authority.
- Margaret Louise Fry. For political service.
- Gilbert Theodore Fuge, Managing Director, Prismo Universal Ltd.
- David Gilbert Geach, Principal, Department of Trade.
- Frank Dale Gibson. For political and public service.
- Kenneth Alan Gilbert, Managing Director, Geevor Tin Mines plc.
- Ronald Crispin Gill, lately Editor, The Countryman.
- Kelvin Glendenning, Leader, Corby District Council.
- John Laurence Gould, Chairman, Laurence Gould and Co. Ltd., ULG Consultants Ltd.
- Beatrice Mary, Lady Graham. For services to disabled people in North Yorkshire.
- Winston Mawdsley Graham, Writer.
- George David Grant, Chief Executive, Nithsdale District Council.
- Francis Charles Graves, Senior Partner, Francis C. Graves & Partners.
- Major Geoffrey Carne Green, lately Leader, Brentwood District Council.
- Jacob Gwyn Griffiths, Farmer, Knelston, Gower. For services to agriculture in Wales.
- David Latham Grundy, Technical Director, Integrated Circuits Group, Ferranti Electronics Ltd.
- Frank Gerald Haigh, Assistant Chief Probation Officer, West Yorkshire Probation and After-Care Service.
- Dennis Hale, Deputy Chief Engineer (Transport), Metropolitan Police.
- Lieutenant-Colonel Henry Robert Hall, TD, DL. For services to the Scout Association in Jersey.
- Brian Thomas Harris, QC, Clerk to the Justices, Poole, Dorset.
- Frederick Charles Harris, Counselling Adviser, West Midlands Small Firms Service.
- Walter Basil Hatcher. For political and public service.
- George Hayes, Director, South Yorkshire Area, National Coal Board.
- Terence Thompstone Henshaw, Group Electrical and Energy Engineer, Amey Roadstone Corporation.
- Kenneth Charles Henry Herring, lately Divisional Director (Industrial/Consumer), Esso Petroleum Co. Ltd.
- Geoffrey Graham Hilditch, General Manager, Leicester City Transport.
- Richard Desmond Hill. For services to Rowing.
- Eric Hoggarth. For services to the Science and Engineering Research Council.
- Victor Leonard Holt, lately Senior Principal, Board of Customs and Excise.
- Daniel Horrocks, Chairman, Broseley Estates Ltd.
- Andrew Beatty Houstoun, MC, DL, lately Convener, Scottish Landowners' Federation.
- Ronald Charles Howell, General Secretary, The Rainer Foundation; Director, The Intermediate Treatment Fund.
- Anne Luise Hunter, Clinical Assistant (Neurology), South West Surrey Health District.
- Thomas Munro Hunter, Secretary, Church of Scotland Committee on Chaplains to HM Forces.
- Roy Vernon Hurrell, Director, Precision Products Group, Stevenage Division, Dynamics Group, British Aerospace plc.
- Captain Maurice Gwynne Hutchinson, TD, Member, Council of St. John Ambulance Association, South and West Yorkshire.
- Edward Robert Jobson. For services to the Royal British Legion.
- Brian Alexander Johnston, MC. For services to Broadcasting and Cricket.
- Alexander Irving Johnstone, Member, Thames Barrier Advisory Team.
- William Henry Jolliffe. For political and public service.
- Dorothy Annie Jones, Nursing Officer, Department of Health and Social Security.
- Myra Jones, lately Senior Principal Scientific Officer, Ministry of Defence.
- Donald George Eric Kent, General Manager, Blyth Harbour Commission.
- Michael Donald Laird, Architect, Edinburgh.
- John Lavelle, Headmaster, Worsbrough High School, Barnsley.
- Richard Alfred Lee, Chief Executive and Secretary, Co-operative Retail Services Ltd.
- Lesley Madeline Lindsay, Northern Ireland Trustee, Women Caring Trust.
- Bessie Gordon Lloyd, Vice-Chairman, Church Army Board.
- Charles Robert Longman, Controller, Engineering and Operations, BBC Television.
- Norman Forbes Low, Governor I, HM Remand Centre, Risley.
- Ronald Stuart McCulloch, Managing Director, Cantrell & Cochrane Ltd.
- Elaine Maria McDonald, Ballet Dancer, Scottish Ballet.
- Major Keith Roderick Turing Mackenzie, MC. For services to Golf.
- George Haliburton Dodds Mackie, Deputy General Manager, Scottish Region, British Rail.
- Andrew McMaster, Senior Principal, Board of Inland Revenue.
- Mary Isabella Blewitt McMaster, Warden and Founder, St. Luke's Home, Oxford.
- Ada Winifred Maddocks, National Organising Officer, National Association of Local Government Officers.
- Wilfrid James Alfred Mann, HM Inspector of Schools.
- Frederick Charles Marks, Chief Executive, Motherwell District Council.
- Patience Elizabeth Marshall. For services to the community in the West Midlands.
- Walter Scott Marshall, Leader, Minority Group, Derbyshire County Council.
- Graham Cyril Mason, Deputy Director, International Affairs, Confederation of British Industry. For services to Export.
- Peter Alan Mawson, Principal, Department of Employment.
- Reginald Mercado, Chairman and Chief Executive, Aerospace Engineering plc.
- George Thomas Meredith, lately Director, Social Services, Norfolk County Council.
- James Miller, Director, Greenock Plant, IBM United Kingdom Ltd.
- James Oliver Morris. For public services in Wales.
- The Reverend John Marcus Harston Morris, Deputy Chairman, National Magazine Company Ltd.
- Alexander Morrison, QPM, Deputy Chief Constable, Strathclyde Police.
- Commander Edwin Allen Morrison, DL, Royal Navy (Retd.), Chairman, St. John Council for Hampshire.
- Richard John Morse, QFSM, Chief Officer, West Glamorgan Fire Brigade.
- Herbert Stephen Mullaly, Vice-Chairman, CBI Education Foundation.
- Charles Neill, lately Chairman, Northern Ireland Coal Advisory Service.
- Howard Millar Nixon. For services to Bookbinding.
- Stasys Obcarskas, lately Area Nursing Officer, Salop Area Health Authority.
- Detta O'Cathain (Mrs. Bishop), Marketing Adviser to the Minister of Agriculture, Fisheries and Food.
- Dilys Mary Palmer, Member of the Board, Washington Development Corporation.
- Dennis Stephen Papworth, lately Senior Principal Scientific Officer, Ministry of Agriculture, Fisheries and Food.
- Joan Partridge. For political and public service.
- Simon Harry Wood Partridge, Chairman, Butterworth Law Publishers Ltd.
- Derek Harley Peters. For political service.
- John Milne Petrie, Engineer and Surveyor, Durham County Council.
- Sheila Mary Pettit, Historic Buildings Representative, Northumbria, The National Trust.
- Frederick Forrest Poskitt, Consultant Civil Engineer and Vice-Chairman of the Northern Ireland Water Council.
- Kenneth George Charles Prevette, lately General Secretary, Cremation Society of Great Britain.
- Douglas Arthur Quadling, Mathematics Tutor, University of Cambridge, Institute of Education.
- John Frederick Reeve, Chairman, Costain Civil Engineering Ltd. Chairman, C.T.H. (The Thames Barrier Consortium).
- Henry Sulien Richards, lately Headmaster, Sir Thomas Jones School, Amlwch, Gwynedd.
- David Griffith Roberts, Chief Executive, Pilkington Ophthalmic Division, Chance Pilkington Ltd.
- Keith Edward Roberts, Farmer, Suffolk. Deputy Chairman, Meat and Livestock Commission.
- William Stewart Robertson, Company Director, Rediffusion plc. For services to Export.
- Hugh Nigel Croke Ellis-Robinson, Programme Director, Mantello Projects, Marconi Radar Systems Ltd. For services to Export.
- Lieutenant-Colonel James Gray Round, DL. For services to the community in Essex.
- Gerald Frederick Gray Russell, First Class Valuer, Board of Inland Revenue.
- William Bonney Rust, lately Principal, Hammersmith and West London College.
- Brian Scholes, lately Chief Executive, Bolton Metropolitan Borough Council.
- Maurice David Shaffner, County Prosecuting Solicitor, West Yorkshire Metropolitan County Council.
- Norman Henry Sherrard, Senior Executive, Industrial Development Board for Northern Ireland.
- Donald Herbert Simpson, Librarian and Director of Studies, Royal Commonwealth Society.
- John Llewellyn Skinner, Chairman, Derbyshire Committee for the Employment of Disabled Persons.
- Professor George Teeling Smith, Director, Office of Health Economics.
- Ralph Morton Smith, lately Principal, Ministry of Defence.
- Gerd Walter Christian Sommerhoff, Director, Centre for Creative Technology, Sevenoaks School, Kent.
- Ernest Antony Spencer, Senior Principal Scientific Officer, National Engineering Laboratory.
- Leslie Albert Spicer, Consultant, Institute of Freight Forwarders.
- Eric Elliot Stabler, Secretary, National Health Service Prescription Pricing Authority (England).
- William Hay Stephen, Chairman, Aberdeen Fish Producers' Organisation Ltd.
- Robert Alister Strand, lately Registrar, Art and Design, Council for National Academic Awards.
- Mary Noel Streatfeild, Writer.
- Gerald Sambrooke Sturgess. For services to Yachting.
- William Royden Stuttaford. For political service.
- James Alexander Sutherland, lately Principal, Scottish Home and Health Department.
- William Alfred Sutton, Chairman, Sutton & Sons, Road Hauliers.
- William James Symons, Chief Finance Officer, Commonwealth War Graves Commission.
- Hubert Taggart, MBE. For services to the Construction Industry in Northern Ireland.
- John Henry Taylor. For political service.
- Professor Kathleen Mary Tillotson. For services to English Literature.
- Dorothy Mary Tomlinson. For political and public service.
- John Barrett Turner, DL. For services to the magistracy in England and Wales.
- Joseph Norman Ullock, QPM, Deputy Chief Constable, Cumbria Constabulary.
- Mary Elizabeth Uprichard, Principal Administrative Education Officer, Central School of Midwifery, Northern Ireland.
- Alexander Primrose Urquhart, Headmaster, Kincorth Academy, Aberdeen.
- Elizabeth Evelyn Murray Usher. For public service, particularly in South-West Scotland.
- Norman Edward Percival Waldren, lately Principal Professional and Technology Officer, Ministry of Defence.
- Ian Bryce Wallace, Singer and Broadcaster.
- Leonard Gordon St. John Waterman. For political service.
- Wilfrid Watkin, General Dental Practitioner, Lowestoft.
- Craig Robert Galloway Watson, Senior Assistant Editor (Committees), House of Commons.
- Alexander McKellar Watt, Chairman, McKellar Watt Ltd., Glasgow.
- James Colin Eden Webster, Chief Executive, British Petroleum Gas.
- Walter Pollock Weir. For services to forensic pathology in Scotland.
- Bertrand Harry Whistance, lately Foreign and Commonwealth Office.
- Elizabeth Mary Whitaker, Member, Board of Visitors, HM Prison Wakefield.
- Robert John White. For services to local government in Northern Ireland.
- John Alexander Whiteside, MBE, Assistant Chief Constable, Royal Ulster Constabulary.
- John Patrick Charles Wilder, Director, Psychiatric Rehabilitation Association.
- Geoffrey Francis John Williams, Consultant in Obstetrics and Gynaecology, Bronglais Hospital, Aberystwyth.
- Zena Alma Pearl Williams. For services to the community in Buckinghamshire.
- Willoughby Wilson, Consultant Surgeon, Royal Victoria Hospital, Belfast.
- Alfred George Woonton. For services to The Royal Naval Association.

Diplomatic Service and Overseas List

- Monique Akroyd. For services to English-language journalism in Belgium.
- Dr. Ian Baker, Assistant Representative, British Council, India.
- William Alan Belsham. For services to British interests in Swaziland.
- Jonathan Betts, First Secretary, HM Embassy, Cairo.
- Anthony John Maitland Blumer. For services to British commercial interests in Malaysia.
- Robert Briggs. For services to the British community in Baghdad.
- Arthur Kenneth Bromley. For services to British commercial interests in Italy.
- Dr. William Nanscawan Brown, Representative, British Council, Denmark.
- Richard Butters, First Secretary (Commercial), British High Commission, Nairobi.
- Hubert Michael Close, MC. For services to education in Pakistan.
- Geoffrey George Collins, lately First Secretary, (Commercial) HM Embassy, Rangoon.
- Brian John Cordery. For services to the British community in Paris.
- Dr. John Cecil Davies. For services to agricultural research in India.
- William Stewart Dundas. For services to technical co-operation in the Yemen Arab Republic.
- Craddock Ebanks. For public services in the Cayman Islands.
- Michael John Evans. For services to British commercial interests in Baghdad.
- John Harold Geoffrey Foley, lately Representative, British Council, Ecuador.
- Bernard Damien Gately, lately First Secretary and Consul, HM Embassy, Athens.
- Raymond Bruce Giles. For services to British commercial interests in Japan.
- Samuel Victor Gittins, QC. For public services in Hong Kong.
- John Coldwell Griffiths, lately Magistrate, Hong Kong.
- Charles Hargrove. For services to journalism in Paris.
- James Neil Henderson, Commissioner for Labour, Hong Kong.
- Edward Richard Charles Holland, MBE, lately HM Consul-General, Alexandria.
- Noel Alexander Johnston. For services to British shipping interests in Belgium.
- Dr. Stephen Richard Keating. For medical services to the community in Seychelles.
- Kenneth William Kelley, First Secretary, HM Embassy, Montevideo.
- Colonel Anthony Lawrence King-Harman, lately International Staff, NATO, Brussels.
- Graham Victor Lassetter. For services to British commercial interests in Trinidad.
- Robert William Lutton. For services to British commercial interests in Singapore:
- Nicholas Melvyn McCarthy, First Secretary and Head of Chancery, HM Embassy, Dakar.
- Ian Francis Cluny MacPherson, Regional Secretary, New Territories, Hong Kong.
- Timothy James Murphy. For services to British commercial interests in Spain.
- David George Pacy. For services to British commercial interests in New York.
- George Marshall Paton. For services to technical co-operation in Ghana.
- Bernard Edward Pauncefort, lately Administrator, Ascension Island.
- John Denis Prifti. For services to British shipping interests in Sierra Leone.
- James Henry Ramagge. For services to the building industry in Gibraltar.
- Ronald Leslie Reeves, lately First Secretary, HM Embassy, Washington.
- Christopher John Spencer Rundle, First Secretary, British Interests Section, Royal Swedish Embassy, Tehran.
- Colin Harry Cecil Rutherford. For services to the British community in Venezuela.
- Nigel Edward Salmon. For services to British commercial and community interests in Nigeria.
- Oliver Richard Siddle, Representative, British Council, Hong Kong.
- Warren Cecil Tyson. For public and community services in St. Kitts-Nevis.
- Frederick Langtree Walker. For public services in Hong Kong.
- Jack Lewis Wicker. For services to British commercial interests in Paris.
- Leonard Kenneth Young, Pro-Vice-Chancellor, Hong Kong University.

Australian States

State of Queensland

- Charles Victor Boyd. For service to the community.
- Reverend Owen Kevin Oxenham. For service to the Church and the community.
- Roy Max Reynolds. Councillor, Royal National Agricultural and Industrial Association of Queensland.
- Dr. Keith William Kirkland Shaw. For service to medicine.

State of South Australia

- Allan Robert Charles McLean. For service to sport.
- Stanley William Otto Menzel. For service to irrigation and piping technology.
- Cedric Jeffrey Thomson. For service to the law.
- William Herbert Wylie. For service to production engineering, cattle breeding and horse racing.

State of Western Australia

- Dr. Carl Georgeff. For service to the community.
- Reginald John Trigg. For service to insurance and surf life saving.

State of Tasmania

- Roy Alexander Gourlay. For service to the community.

==== Member of the Order of the British Empire (MBE) ====
Military Division

Royal Navy

- Lieutenant Commander (SCC) John Bailie, Royal Naval Reserve.
- Lieutenant (CS) Stephen Lionel Baker, BEM, Royal Marines.
- Lieutenant Commander David Albert Bartlett.
- Fleet Chief Petty Officer (OPS) (R) Simon Hugh Beel, J926468Q.
- Lieutenant Commander Dennis Corless.
- Lieutenant Commander (Honorary Commander) Anthony Roger Evans.
- Lieutenant Commander Peter Bernard Evershed.
- Warrant Officer First Class John Robert French, Royal Marines, PO19457L.
- Lieutenant Commander Geoffrey Robert Fyleman.
- Lieutenant Charles Victor Hanna.
- Lieutenant Commander Geoffrey Arnold Harrison, VRD, Royal Naval Reserve.
- Fleet Chief Weapon Engineering Mechanic Joseph Ivan James, M915230Y.
- Senior Nursing Officer Ethel Jean Kidd, Queen Alexandra's Royal Naval Nursing Service.
- Fleet Chief Writer Joseph John O'Mahony, DO74522X.
- Lieutenant Commander John Richard Taylor.
- Lieutenant Commander Stanley Colin Wadman.
- Lieutenant Commander Peter Robert Walwyn.

Army

- Major Thomas Douglas Raeburn Archibald, TD, (486474), Intelligence Corps, Territorial Army.
- Major (now Acting Lieutenant Colonel) Albert Raymond Bell (472486), Corps of Royal Military Police.
- Major Anne Kathleen Brown (475397), Women's Royal Army Corps.
- Major Roger Morgan Brumhill, TD, (480941), Corps of Royal Military Police, Territorial Army.
- Major (Quartermaster) William Ronald Clarke (496655), Grenadier Guards.
- Captain (Quartermaster) George Ingram Cooper (502108), Scots Guards.
- Major (Quartermaster) Stuart Cottage, TD, (462271), Royal Corps of Signals, Territorial Army.
- 24003203 Warrant Officer Class 2 Raymonde Dewsnap, Royal Army Ordnance Corps.
- 23750661 Warrant Officer Class 1 James Doherty, Royal Corps of Signals.
- Major Robert Hugh Geoffrey Elford (489183), Royal Corps of Signals.
- Major (Quartermaster) Malcolm Denzil Evans (496127), Royal Tank Regiment.
- Major Graham Anderson Ewer (479220), Royal Corps of Transport.
- Major Robin Anthony Field-Smith (489314), Royal Army Educational Corps.
- Acting Major James Austin Brown Gibson (468898), Army Cadet Force, Territorial Army.
- Major Patrick John Henderson (490198), Royal Corps of Transport.
- Captain (Quartermaster) Terence Graham Hodgetts (501942), The Green Howards (Alexandra, Princess of Wales's Own Yorkshire Regiment).
- Major William Michael Whewell Jackson (473982), Intelligence Corps.
- Major Richard Michael Lambe (482768), Royal Regiment of Artillery.
- Major Donald Latham, ERD, TD, (369122), Royal Army Pay Corps, Territorial Army.
- Major (Quartermaster) Frank Lawrie (493891), Scots Guards.
- Major Janet Laurie Lawson (494202), Women's Army Corps.
- Captain (Quartermaster) Patrick Lewis (501879), Royal Regiment of Artillery.
- 23864474 Warrant Officer Class 1 Francis Joseph John Lyle, Royal Pioneer Corps.
- Major (Quartermaster) Ernest John Mann (497080), Royal Corps of Signals.
- 23887423 Warrant Officer Class 2 (Acting Warrant Officer Class 1) Kauata Vamarasi Marafono, Special Air Service Regiment.
- Major James Robert McRae (497779), Special Air Service Regiment, Territorial Army.
- 23206262 Warrant Officer Class 2 Leslie Merifield, Coldstream Guards.
- Major Alan Mills (472924), Royal Army Pay Corps.
- Major Timothy Julian O'Donnell (491174), 10th Princess Mary's Own Gurkha Rifles.
- Captain (Acting Major) Francis William Price, TD, (475599), The Royal Irish Rangers (27th (Inniskilling) 83rd and 87th), Territorial Army.
- LS/14471322 Warrant Officer Class 2 (Acting Warrant Officer Class 1) Gordon William Rabet, The Parachute Regiment.
- Acting Captain Anthony Philip Solway (459682), Army Cadet Force, Territorial Army.
- Major Gordon Wallace Stafford (495903), Army Air Corps.
- Captain David James Taggart (496168), Corps of Royal Electrical and Mechanical Engineers.
- Major (Quartermaster) Robert Alexander Tighe (486473), The Duke of Wellington's Regiment (West Riding).
- 23675401 Warrant Officer Class 1 Geoffrey Richard Tolley, Corps of Royal Engineers.
- Major (Director of Music) Gordon Turner (497337), Royal Corps of Signals.
- Major (Quartermaster) Arthur Bryan Wheatley (494880), Royal Tank Regiment.
- Major (Quartermaster) William Frederick Whiting, BEM, (489292), Corps of Royal Engineers.
- Major Anthony Williams (486411), Intelligence Corps.
- Major (Quartermaster) John Stephen Williams, DCM, (492059), The Parachute Regiment.
- Captain (Quartermaster) Henry Wood (506283), Royal Regiment of Artillery.

Royal Air Force

- Squadron Leader Leslie Brown (2746273).
- Squadron Leader Roger Frederick Richard Carr, (4233050).
- Squadron Leader Roderick Bruce Alexander Moore (4161555).
- Squadron Leader Neil Robert Pollock (1624440).
- Squadron Leader Phillip Wycliffe Roser (608889).
- Squadron Leader Joseph Robert Denis Sauzier (609344).
- Squadron Leader Graham Skinner (609364).
- Flight Lieutenant Kenneth Albert Butcher (3088345), Royal Air Force Volunteer Reserve (Training).
- Flight Lieutenant George William Starling (2337638), Royal Air Force Volunteer Reserve (Training).
- Flight Lieutenant Christopher Alan Suckling (690183).
- Flight Lieutenant Anne Whitelock (8031838), Women's Royal Air Force.
- Acting Flight Lieutenant Davin Richfield Wyatt (683819).
- Warrant Officer Dennis Desmond Cross (H4127958).
- Warrant Officer David Hampton Dorward (D4132468).
- Warrant Officer David Downie (R4022144).
- Warrant Officer Kenneth John Grant (J3503340).
- Warrant Officer Dennis Cecil David Jones (J4004190).
- Warrant Officer William Patrick Lilley, (X4145737).
- Warrant Officer John Richard Lumley, BEM, (B0579017).
- Warrant Officer Harold Peach, BEM, (G4143650).
- Warrant Officer Allan David George Smith (U0587283).
- Warrant Officer William George Winterbourne (B2575904).
- Warrant Officer Trevor St. Clair Wonfor (A3526443).
- Master Air Loadmaster Timothy Alan Bond (H0594239).

Civil Division

- Nathan Abrahams, lately Director, Mappin (Caterers) plc. For services to the Catering Industry.
- Arthur John Adam, Member, National Gas Consumers' Council.
- Adrian Neil Adams. For services to Judo.
- Paul Vernon Adcock, Executive Officer, Board of Customs and Excise.
- Christina Alice Aikenhead, Area Cancer Registration Officer, Lothian Health Board.
- David Gear Aitchison, lately Chief Executive, Scottish Fishermen's Federation.
- Jill Allen, Chairman, Joint Committee on Mobility of the Blind and Partially-Sighted People, National Federation of the Blind.
- Anthony Allibone, General Medical Practitioner, Norfolk.
- Sidney Francis Walter Arnold, Senior Executive Officer, Board of Inland Revenue.
- George Loudon Atkinson, Area Industrial Relations Officer, North East Area, National Coal Board.
- Cecil Leslie Auckland, Assistant Division Officer, Department of the Environment.
- William Henry Austin, Founder and Director, Happy Days Coaches (Woodseaves) Ltd., Stafford.
- Grace Margaret Axton, lately Principal Adoption Officer, Chichester Diocesan Association for Family Social Work.
- William Harry Leonard Baker, Chief Instructor (and Organiser), Watford Training Scheme for Motorcyclists.
- Violet Ballantine. For services to the National Society for the Prevention of Cruelty to Children.
- William Reginald Barber, Marketing Manager, (South America), Cheltenham Division, Smiths Industries, Aerospace and Defence Systems Company. For services to Export.
- Harold John Barker, Planning Manager, D.S.W.P.(N.), Marconi Communication Systems Ltd.
- Norah Barker, Ward Sister, Pilgrim Hospital, South Lincolnshire Health Authority.
- Sidney Barnard, lately Manager, Export Branch, Navy, Army and Air Force Institutes.
- Eric Leslie Barnes, lately Telecommunications Technical Officer Grade I, Home Office.
- Mary Ross Baxter, Deputy Director, National Book League, Scotland.
- Anthony Herbert Bayman. For political service.
- Carmen Etheline Marjorie Beckford, Senior Community Relations Officer, Bristol Council for Racial Equality.
- Joyce Lilian Benham. For services to mentally disabled people in Gravesend and district.
- Thomas Warwick Bennett, lately manager, London Trade Counter, Chatto, Bodley Head & Jonathan Cape Ltd.
- Mintose Bibby. For political and public service in the North West.
- Franklin Edwin Birch, lately Clerk, Worshipful Company of Farriers.
- Violet Mabel Bitchenor, Welfare Officer, Northampton and County Spastics Society.
- Joseph Paterson Black, General Secretary, Scottish Police Federation.
- Theresa Black, Senior Nursing Officer, Stradreagh Hospital, Londonderry.
- Charles Clarke Bodel, Assistant Director of Research, Lambeg Industrial Research Association.
- Nancye Kathleen Boobbyer. For services to the Sussex Kidney Trust.
- Peter Lawrence Booty, Assistant Secretary, London Orchestral Concerts Board.
- Isaac Henry John Bourne, Medical Officer, Remploy Ltd.
- Grace Joan Valerie Bourns. For services to the community in Bristol.
- Donald Benjamin Brewer, Assistant Chief Warning Officer, Horsham, United Kingdom Warning and Monitoring Organisation.
- Neville Britton, Director, Hartlepool Docks, Tees and Hartlepool Port Authority.
- Ronald Maxwell Brown, Chief Forester, Forestry Commission.
- Elizabeth Woodrow Browning, Chairman, Association for All Speech-Impaired Children.
- Desmond Charles Buchanan, lately Chief Inspector, Avon and Somerset Constabulary.
- Commander Bruce Errol Bulbeck, Royal Navy (Retd.), Retired Officer I, Ministry of Defence.
- Joan Marguerite Burge, Personal Secretary, Ministry of Defence.
- Agnes Hope Johnson Burn. For political and public service.
- John Ralston Butterly, Chairman, Reidvale Housing Association.
- Olive Hylda Margaret Cass, Superintendent, of Typists, Supplies Department, Greater London Council.
- George Casson, Clerk, Northumberland Engine Works, Clark Hawthorn Ltd.
- Margaret Sarah Castle, Nursing Officer, Neo-Natal Unit, Hammersmith Hospital, London.
- Thomas Cawley, lately Senior Librarian, Rothamsted Experimental Station, Harpenden.
- Eric Alfred Chaplin, General Manager, Sub District Area, South East London, The Post Office.
- Harold Edward Chappell. For services to local government in Lincolnshire.
- Jacqueline Meynell Cingel, Higher Executive Officer, Department of the Environment.
- Daphne Diana Clark, Director, Richmond upon Thames Churches' Housing Trust.
- Francis Arthur Clark. For political service.
- George Edward Claydon, Chief Superintendent, Metropolitan Police.
- Ernest Reginald Clow, Air Traffic Engineer I, Civil Aviation Authority.
- Peter John Cooke, Executive Engineer, British Telecom.
- Angela Janet Vera Cotton, Chairman, National Association of Probation Hostels.
- Eileen Ruth Elizabeth Cox. For services to disabled people in Shepperton and District.
- James Cullen, Convener of Housing Committee, Gordon District Council.
- James Cusack, Auxiliary Officer (Technical), Royal Naval Auxiliary Service.
- George Llewellyn Davies, DSC, Engineer's Representative, Thames Barrier Project, Rendel, Palmer & Tritton, Consulting Engineers.
- Robert Hefin Davies, Managing Director and Chairman, J. W. Greaves & Sons Ltd.
- Donald Charles Davis, Senior Executive Officer, Department of Energy.
- Kathleen Margaret Laurie Davis. For services to the community in Wolvey and District, Leicestershire.
- Michael Edgar Drew Davis, Group Finance and Planning Manager, Greenall Whitley plc.
- Nicole Matilde Davoud, Founder and Chairman, Crack MS.
- James Bartholomew Devine, Superintendent, Royal Ulster Constabulary.
- Eric Ernest Dew. For services to dioceses in the South East.
- Iqbal Singh Dhut, Executive Officer, Board of Customs and Excise.
- Joyce Mary Dickson, Centre Organiser, Ringwood, Hampshire Branch, British Red Cross Society.
- Rosemary Cadbury Dickson. For services to the community in Northern Ireland.
- Hilda Ritchie Doran, Senior Lecturer in Primary Education, Aberdeen College of Education.
- Constance Mona Douglas. For services to Manx Culture.
- Charles Draper, Manager, Resettlement Unit, Department of Health and Social Security.
- Audrey Alice Grace Duddy, Head, Remedial Department, Saffron Walden County High School.
- Hazel Catherine Dutton, Matron, Marie Curie Memorial Foundation, Sunnybank Nursing Home, Liverpool.
- Margaret Easton, lately Administrative Assistant, Careers Service, Tyne and Wear.
- Audrey Eveline Lucilla Edwards. For services to the community in Hayling Island.
- Henry Elliott, Senior Executive Officer, Department of Employment.
- Edna Dorothy Embleton. For services to the community in Buckingham.
- Ronald Walter Emes, Director, The British Canoe Union.
- Sidney Albert England, Professional and Technology Officer Grade I, (Mechanical and Electrical), Department of the Environment.
- The Reverend Canon Owen Vyvyan Eva, Rector, St. Nicholas, Halewood Parish Church.
- Lieutenant Commander Cyril Joseph Evans, Royal Naval Reserve (Retd.), Chairman, Leicester Unit Committee, Sea Cadet Corps.
- Yvonne Winifred Filleul, Personal Secretary, Cable & Wireless plc.
- John George Russell Fletcher. For political service.
- Marjorie Hannah Earnshaw Flowerday, Medical Assistant, Blood Transfusion Service, Sheffield.
- Bernard William Foreman, Assistant Divisional Organiser, Colchester, Amalgamated Union of Engineering Workers.
- Keith William Forward, Divisional Education Officer, Dartford, Kent.
- Ursula Una Clare Foss, Disaster Relief Purchasing Officer, British Red Cross Society.
- Veronique Lucy Vernon Foster, Secretary, South West and Southern Regions, Abbeyfield Society.
- Anthony Conway Gabe. For services to the Blind in Mid-Sussex.
- Alan John Gane, Chief Commandant, Cambridgeshire Special Constabulary.
- Alexander McLean Garden, Foreign and Commonwealth Office.
- John Frederick Gardiner, Senior Executive Officer, Department of Health and Social Security.
- Edward John George, Detective Chief Superintendent, Metropolitan Police.
- Richard Dennis Gilbert, Manager, Company Secretariat, B.L. plc.
- Beatrice Gillam, Member, Council, Wiltshire Trust for Nature Conservation.
- Duncan Alexander Goodhew. For services to Swimming.
- Donald Frederick Goodwin, Principal Partner, D. & P. Goodwin Ltd. (Fruit Growers).
- Michael Gurnell Green, General Medical Practitioner, Burscough, Lancashire.
- The Reverend Charles Grice, General Secretary, The Church Lads' and Church Girls' Brigade.
- David John Griffith, Commissioner, Clwyd County, St. John Ambulance Brigade.
- Arnold Grimston, Collector of Taxes, Board of Inland Revenue.
- Mabel Alice Jane Hales. For services to the community in Norfolk.
- Henry Palmer Halkett, lately Chairman, Local Review Committees, HM Prisons, Aberdeen and Peterhead.
- Charles William Hall, Works Director, Ladybird Books Ltd.
- Maeve Patricia Hall, lately Member, Northern Ireland Tourist Board.
- James Peter Hamilton, Assistant Secretary, Occupational Safety and Health, Social Insurance and Industrial Welfare Department, Trades Union Congress.
- Doris Lillian Harris, Personal Secretary, Department of Transport.
- William George Alfred Hathaway. For services to the community in Usk.
- Donald William Hawkins, Professional and Technology Officer Grade I, Ministry of Defence.
- Kathleen Mary Hazzard, Personal Secretary, Department of Employment.
- Donald Gill Headley, lately Chief Test Pilot, Brough, Kingston-Brough Division, Aircraft Group, British Aerospace plc.
- James Ivor Heath, Senior Executive Officer, Ministry of Defence.
- John Barrie Hesketh, Artistic Director, Mull Little Theatre.
- Marianne Edith Frances Hesketh, Artistic Director, Mull Little Theatre.
- George Ernest Hill, Vice-Principal, North East Derbyshire College of Further Education, Chesterfield.
- Edward Wiliam Hobson, TD, Head Teacher, Meltham Church of England Primary School, Kirklees.
- Edward Joscelyn Holland, Farmer, Staffordshire. For services to agriculture.
- Robert Hollingdrake, Counsellor, Manchester Small Firms Service.
- Charles Reginald Hopkin, Chief Superintendent, North Yorkshire Police.
- Clifford Frederick Charles Cecil Hopkins, Site Manager, Heysham 1, National Nuclear Corporation Ltd.
- Jack Howarth (John Aubrey Conway Howarth), Actor, and for services to charity.
- John Hoy, lately Manager, Londonderry Terminal, Shell UK Ltd.
- Albert Hughes, Executive Officer, Department of Employment.
- John Hughes, Chairman, Wales Council for the Blind.
- Edward Arthur Humphreys, lately Senior Executive Officer, Department of Health and Social Security.
- Edward Desmonde Carlisle Hunt, Executive Officer, Department of Employment.
- Ruby Hunt. For services to the community in Lincolnshire.
- Denys Dobell Hutchings, Secretary, Kennet and Avon Canal Trust Ltd.
- Isobel June Hutchings. For political service.
- Florence Rose Inglis, Member, Monklands District Council.
- Robert Stewart Inglis, General Sales Manager, Clyde Canvas Goods & Structures Ltd., Port Glasgow.
- Marjorie Rose Isgar, Headteacher, Perth-y-Terfyn Infants School, Holywell.
- Irene Israel, lately General Secretary, Basingstoke Council of Community Service.
- Bill Jackson, Secretary, Sutton Valence Branch, Agricultural and Allied Workers' National Trade Group.
- Marlene Jefferson, for services to local government in Londonderry.
- Ronald Samuel Johnston, Secretary, Rathgael and Whiteabby Schools Management Board, Bangor.
- Richard ap Simon Jones, Farmer, Tywyn, Gwynedd.
- Leslie Jordan, lately Professional and Technology Officer Grade I, Ministry of Defence.
- Amy Beatrice Jury, Member of Council, St. Andrew's Ambulance Association.
- Jane Margaret Kendall. For political and public service.
- Ralph Erskine Kendrick, Vice-President, Boys' Clubs of Wales.
- Pearl Winifred Kerr. For services to Muckamore Abbey Hospital, Antrim.
- Charles George Herbert Keyse, Senior Executive Officer, Board of Customs and Excise.
- Norah Mabel King, Principal Personnel Assistant, Central Departments, London Transport.
- Terence Kinkead, Vice-Chairman, Belfast Savings Council.
- Walter Mansfield Kitchen, Divisional Officer 1, London Fire Brigade.
- Trevor George Crosby Knight, Joint Chairman, East and West Sussex Supplementary Benefit Appeal Tribunals.
- Raymond Keith Knowles, Typist, Department of Health and Social Security.
- Thomson Rae Lannigan. For political service.
- Patrick Larry Lay, Senior Executive Officer, Department of Health and Social Security.
- Denis William Lupton Leslie, Chairman, Penlee Station Committee, Royal National Lifeboat Institution.
- Moira Hamilton Levins, Senior Superintendent of Typists, Department of Education and Science.
- Leslie Maurice Albert Lightfoot, Sports Editor, Windsor, Slough and Eton Express.
- Henry Loring, Local Officer Grade II, Department of Health and Social Security.
- Ivy Lough, lately Personal Assistant and Secretary, British Industrial Estates Corporation.
- Maureen Millicent Lowrey, Senior Nursing Officer, Frimley Park Hospital, West Surrey and North East Hampshire District Health Authority.
- Lieutenant-Colonel Michael Alastair Lowry, MC. For political service.
- Gordon David Luckings, Administrative Officer, ILEA (Sydenham School).
- Margaret McGavin. For political service.
- Daniel Fergus McGrain. For services to Association Football in Scotland.
- Dorothy May Macintyre, Assistant Rector, Lochaber High School, Fort William.
- Donald MacKay, lately Director of Environmental Health and Housing, East Kilbride District Council.
- Margaret Jean Mackenzie, Headmistress, Locharron Primary School.
- George Edward Mackley, Wood Engraver.
- David Morrison MacMillan, Secretary, Royal National Mission to Deep Sea Fishermen.
- Margaret Mary McNaughton. For political and public service.
- Thomas Mallaburn, Branch Secretary, General and Municipal Workers' Union.
- Herbert Edward Maloney. For political and public service.
- Ruth Manley, Nurse Adviser, Society of Geriatric Nursing, Royal College of Nursing.
- William James Mann, Member, Ulster Defence Regiment Advisory Council.
- Audrey Thelma Manyweathers, Clerical Officer, Ministry of Agriculture, Fisheries and Food.
- June Ida Marmont, Principal Careers Officer, London Borough of Bexley.
- Mary Marquis (Mary Elizabeth Maxwell Anderson), Presenter/Interviewer, Scotland, British Broadcasting Corporation.
- Lawrence Martin, lately Head, Department of Catering Technology, Granville College of Further Education, Sheffield.
- Henryk Matuszak. For services to the Polish Community and Penley Hospital, Clwyd.
- Sidney Ronald Mead. For services to The Forces Help Society and Lord Roberts Workshops.
- James Meldrum. For charitable services to the Arts in Scotland.
- Leonard Arthur Metcalf, Passenger Services Manager, Euston, British Rail.
- John Frederick Miles, Consultant, Royal Automobile Club and Royal Society for the Prevention of Accidents.
- Roger Millward. For services to Rugby League Football.
- Henry Frank Hugh Mitchell, Regional Manager, Product Support, India, Rolls-Royce Ltd. For services to Export.
- John Leonard Moir, Senior Maintenance Supervisor, Hamilton Brothers.
- Hester Guthrie Monteath, Head Occupational Therapist, Royal Edinburgh Hospital.
- Ravinand Mooneeram, Community/Adult Tutor in South Glamorgan.
- Edward Morley, Industrial Development Officer, Hartlepool Borough Council.
- Marjorie Catherine Morrison. For services to the Architectural Association.
- Susan Charlotte Morrow, Clerical Assistant, Police Authority, Northern Ireland.
- George Mackenzie Murray, Farmer, Rogart, Sutherland.
- James Murray, Secretary, Metropolitan and City Police Orphans Fund.
- Ronald Henry Nethercott, Regional Secretary, Region No. 3, Transport and General Workers Union.
- Frank John Neve, Principal, Export Sales Management Associates. For services to Export.
- Violet Ellen Edith Nicholls, Senior Personal Secretary, Public Trustee Office.
- Martin Hugh Michael O'Neill. For services to Association Football.
- Wyndham John Parker. For political and public service.
- Ronald Albert Partridge, Professional and Technology Officer Grade II, Ministry of Defence.
- John Edward Stark Pay, Director, South East Region, Colt International Ltd. For services to Export.
- Frederick Gordon Thomas Pearce, Senior Executive Officer, Department of Employment.
- Marion Trewhella Richards Pearce. For services to the community in St. Ives.
- Johanna Maria Chiappini Peebles, lately Secretary, The Friends of St. Paul's Cathedral.
- Major Albert Harold Pendleton. For services to the community in the Blackpool and Fylde area.
- Alida Penney, Divisional Nursing Officer, West Suffolk Health Authority.
- Patrick Thomas Gordon-Duff-Pennington. For services to the National Farmers' Union of Scotland.
- Francis Brian Pinney, Secretary, Okehampton and District Branch, Muscular Dystrophy Group of Great Britain.
- William Edward Plummer, Postal Executive C, Newark Sub-Office, Midlands Postal Board, The Post Office.
- James Ernest Pople, Senior Executive Officer, Management and Personnel Office.
- Gwendoline Alice Pounds. For services to the community in Marlow, Buckinghamshire.
- Kenneth Povey, lately Deputy Regional Personnel Officer, West Midlands Regional Health Authority.
- Archibald Chalmers Purves, Director/Secretary, Hawick Knitwear Manufacturers' Association.
- Ralph Alexander Raby, Director, Addison Housing Association.
- Guy Garland Reaks, MC, lately Director, British Leather Federation, for services to Export.
- Margaret Ellen Richards, lately Administrative Assistant, University of London Institute of Education.
- Christopher Keith Richardson, Principal Research Associate, Plessey Electronic Systems Research.
- Geoffrey Richardson, Director, National Wool Textile Export Corporation. For services to Export.
- Leonard Eric Leslie Ridge. For political service in London.
- William Scott Rigler, Member, Poole Borough Council.
- John Benjamin Rilett, Training Manager, Bristol Division, Dynamics Group, British Aerospace plc.
- Benjamin Edward Robert Rook, Higher Executive Officer, Board of Inland Revenue.
- Rosemary Jean Rowles, Land Agency and Agriculture Divisional Secretary, Royal Institution of Chartered Surveyors.
- Thomas Roycroft, Higher Executive Officer, Department of Health and Social Security.
- Eric Royle, Chairman, Joint Consultative Council, Meat Trade in the United Kingdom.
- Eric William Russell, Secretary, Road Haulage Association.
- Leslie Joseph Sage, Senior Executive Officer, Director of Public Prosecutions.
- Norman Frank Salisbury. For services to the Scout Association in Manchester.
- Arnold Harry Scholfield. For political service.
- Joan Chalmers Semple, Personal Secretary, Scottish Office.
- Margarete Sharpe, Sister, Drug Addiction Unit, University College Hospital, London.
- Adrian Shepherd, Cellist.
- Lilian Joan Sherwin, lately Executive Officer, Ministry of Defence.
- Bernard Simcox. For political and public service.
- Robert John King Sinclair, Chief Superintendent, Royal Ulster Constabulary.
- George Paul Bernard Smith. For political service.
- John Smith, Chairman, Lanarkshire Committee for the Employment of Disabled Persons.
- Maisie Kathleen Smith, Chairman, The Birmingham Settlement.
- Edward Charles Snow, Inspector Grade III(T), Board of Inland Revenue.
- Anna Margreta Constance So Ye, Vice-Principal, Lurgan Girls' Junior High School.
- Annie Stansfield, Secretary, National Association for the Relief of Paget's Disease.
- Reginald Stead. For services to music in Cumbria.
- Mavis Mary Steele. For services to Women's Bowls.
- John Barclay Stevenson, General Medical Practitioner, Greenock.
- William Stewart, Manager, Manufacturing Services, N. E. I. Parsons.
- Timothy Richard Stowell, Export Sales Manager, Craig-Nicol Ltd., Glasgow.
- Audrey Vera May Strange, lately Director of Music and Art, Royal Over-Seas League.
- Peter John Summers, Managing Director, Deeside Enterprise Trust Ltd., British Steel Corporation.
- Clifford Swindells, Managing Director, Marglass Ltd. For services to Export.
- Margaret Edith Tarn, Organiser, South Tyneside, Citizens' Advice Bureau.
- Catherine Joan Taylor. For public and charitable services in Upton-upon-Severn.
- Colin Richard Taylor, lately Senior Executive Officer, Government Hospitality Fund, Foreign and Commonwealth Office.
- Flora Mabel Taylor, Senior/Chief Physiological Measurement Technician (Neurophysiology).
- Iris Joyce Taylor. For services to the Coventry Branch, Royal Air Forces Association.
- Peter Anthony Taylor, Executive Officer, HM Stationery Office.
- Arthur Robinson Thomas, VRD, lately Chairman, Devon Conservation Forum.
- John Thomas, Convener, Construction and Allied Technical Trades, Port Talbot, British Steel Corporation.
- Francis Daley Thompson. For services to Athletics.
- Tom Hastings Thompson, Deputy District Treasurer, Oxfordshire Health Authority.
- Thomas Samuel Tibble, lately Manager, Subscriptions and Records, Institution of Mechanical Engineers.
- Doris Mary Tidy, Executive Officer, Department of Health and Social Security.
- Gordon Tiplady, Regional Collector, Board of Inland Revenue.
- George Tomlinson, Assistant General Secretary, British Limbless Ex-Servicemen's Association.
- Margaret Fletcher Torrance, lately Guider-in-Charge, Scottish Girl Guide Training and Camping Centre, Netherurd.
- Bessie Lorna Tucker, lately Superintendent Radiographer, Velindre Hospital, Cardiff.
- James Underwood, lately Chief Housing Officer, North Tyneside District Council.
- Pauline Mary Veasey, Senior Receptionist, Latham House Medical Practice, Melton Mowbray, Leicestershire.
- Albert Ernest Veitch, Higher Executive Officer, Department of Health and Social Security.
- John Harold Vernon, Executive Producer, Performing Arts, Music and Arts Department, British Broadcasting Corporation.
- Thomas Walter Villa, Staff Officer, Department of Health and Social Services, Northern Ireland.
- Dorothy Milne Wadsworth, Award Liaison Officer for Northern Ireland, The Duke of Edinburgh's Award.
- Allan Charles Wakeford, Information Officer, Central Office of Information.
- Arthur Polden Walker, RD, Manager, Professional and Regulatory Services, Procter & Gamble Ltd.
- Daniel Blair Wallace, Chief Superintendent, Royal Ulster Constabulary.
- Muriel Mackie Walls. For services to the community in Guildford.
- Brian Lawrence Ward, Superintendent, Thames Valley Police.
- Alan Watson, Headmaster, Acacias Primary School, Manchester.
- Vera Margaret Watts, lately Director of Nurse Education, Portsmouth and South East Hampshire Health Authority.
- Emma Webb, BEM, Principal Fire Control Officer, West Midlands Fire Brigade.
- William Joseph Webber, Deputy Chief Staff Welfare Officer, Home Office.
- Joan Lily West. For political service.
- Vera Anne Wetherall. For political service.
- Keith Stracey Wheeler. For services to environmental education.
- Gwenllian Enid, Lady Whittaker, lately District Organiser, Scarborough, Women's Royal Voluntary Service.
- James Archibald Whittle, Financial Controller, Haven Products Ltd.
- Alfreda Mary Lowe-Willetts, County Organiser, Hampshire Federation of Young Farmers' Clubs.
- Hywel Peredur Williams, Chairman, Welsh Association of Youth Clubs.
- Walter Temple Williams, Higher Executive Officer, Ministry of Defence.
- Beryl Joan Wilmshurst, Higher Executive Officer, Departments of Trade and Industry.
- Cyril Winskell, Architect, Newcastle upon Tyne.
- Donald Hewitt Wood, Manager, Experimental Shop, J. C. Bamford Excavators Ltd.
- Richard Alfred Wood, Chairman, J. W. Falkner & Sons Ltd.
- Arnold Woodhouse. For political service.
- Joyce Lilian Woodhouse, lately Administrative Officer (Awards Division), Inner London Education Authority.
- Eileen Olive Woods, Chairman, West Somerset District Council.
- Joan Woods, Head Teacher, Croft Special School, Liverpool.
- Kenneth Arthur Woodward, Headmaster, Bordon County Junior School, Hampshire.
- Brian Percy Stewart Wright, Director, London Enterprise Agency.
- Elizabeth Graham Jones Wright, lately Chief Superintendent of Typists, HM Treasury.
- Captain Arthur Thomson Young, lately Harbour Master, Clyde Port Authority.
- Jacob Young, Shipbuilding Manager, Swan Hunter Shipbuilding Ltd.

Diplomatic Service and Overseas List

- Stuart Alfred Booth. For services to the community in the Falkland Islands.
- Joseph Oscar Borastero, Charge Nurse, Medical and Health Department, Gibraltar.
- Ena Stuart Burke. For nursing and welfare services to the community in Jerusalem.
- Nancy Josephine Campbell, Press and Information Officer, British High Commission, Ottawa.
- Gertrude Lois, Lady Cane, for services to the British community in San Francisco.
- Donald Cartwright, CPM, lately First Secretary (Commercial) HM Embassy, Tel Aviv.
- Donald Siu-tung Chan, Chief Labour Officer, Labour Relations Department, Hong Kong.
- Clive Cecil Francis Chandler. For services to the British community in Morocco.
- Mo-Yan Chik, lately Chief Inspector, Royal Hong Kong Police Force.
- Thomas Coleman Christian, Radio Officer, Pitcairn Island.
- Margaret Jean Clements. For services to the British community in Miami.
- Dennis Convery, BEM, lately Archivist, British Military Government, Berlin.
- Doris Corbin. For services to the community in Bermuda.
- John Cummins, Second Secretary (Administration) HM Embassy, Santiago.
- Iris Isabel Dawes, Personal Secretary, British High Commission, Dacca.
- Margaret Hilda Dodd. For services to the British Community in Brussels.
- Brendan Grattan Mary Donnelly, lately Administration Officer, HM Embassy, Beirut.
- Doris Edwards. For nursing and welfare services to the community in Lahore.
- John Joseph Gomez, Senior Executive Officer, Tourist Department, Gibraltar.
- Richard Charles Benedict Green, lately Second Secretary, HM Embassy, Beirut.
- Amy Eleanor Griffis. For services to the British community in Peru.
- Alice May Hardy. For welfare services to the blind in Bermuda.
- John Francis Hoare. For services to technical education in Indonesia.
- Elizabeth Valentine Isaacs, Confidential Secretary, HM Embassy, Montevideo.
- Henry Hong-cheong Ku, Chief Executive Officer, Security Branch, Hong Kong.
- Gladys Margaret Dinsdale Laborde. For nursing and welfare services to the British community in Paris.
- Jane Isabella Sarah Lackie. For services to the British community in Port Elizabeth.
- Albert Applebum Richard Lake. For services to the community in Anguilla.
- Teresa Shui-shuk Lam Wong. For services to the community in Hong Kong.
- Donald Lancaster. For services to British interests in Senegal.
- Clifford Raymond Lee, Officer-in-Charge, composite Signals Station, Ascension Island.
- Gwendoline Joan Libbrecht, Vice-Consul, HM Consulate-General, Antwerp.
- Thian Tek Lim, Information Officer, HM Embassy, Jakarta.
- Belinda Jane Lindeck, Personal Assistant to the United Kingdom Permanent Representative to the United Nations, New York.
- Che-woo Lui. For public services in Hong Kong.
- John Ian Carr MacDougall. For services to transport development in Tanzania.
- Robert McNeill. For services to agricultural development in Malawi.
- Alan James Milton. For services to British commercial interests in Nigeria.
- Annie Mitscher. For services to the British community in New Jersey.
- Anna Lee, Mrs Nathan. For services to the British community in Los Angeles.
- Eric Ronald George Nelson, Attaché, HM Embassy, Beirut.
- Cedric Rawnsley Osborne. For public services in Montserrat.
- Janice Sonia Mary Palmer, Personal Assistant to HM Consul-General, Johannesburg.
- Patricia Frances Parkinson, lately Assistant Administration Officer, HM Embassy, Pretoria.
- Arthur Glyn Parry, Vice-Consul, HM Consulate-General, Lille.
- Douglas Sutherland Payne, Professor of Chemistry, Hong Kong University.
- James Watson Purves. For services to agricultural development in Kenya.
- Winifred Robinson. For nursing and welfare services to the community in Kenya.
- Rosemary Sandercock. For nursing and welfare services to the community in Kenya.
- Isaac Scott. For welfare services to the community in Thailand.
- Kevin Maxwell Sinclair. For services to journalism in Hong Kong.
- Agnes Jannis Skerritt. For services to the community in St. Kitts-Nevis.
- The Reverend Walter Frank Snedker. For welfare services to seamen in Santos, Brazil.
- Mary Agnes Stilwell. For nursing and welfare services to the community in Lisbon.
- Warren Stoutt. For services to the community in the British Virgin Islands.
- Mary Catherine Swales. For nursing and welfare services to the community in Ghana.
- Darby Burnard Tibbetts. For public and community services in the Cayman Islands.
- Richard Michael White. Second Secretary and Consul, HM Embassy, Dakar.
- Howard Kung-kuen Yung. Maintenance Surveyor, Housing Department, Hong Kong.

Australian States

State of Queensland

- Alan Edmund William Edwards, Artistic Director, Queensland Theatre Company.
- Evelyn Haswell Kuskie. For service to the community.
- Paul Edward McLean. For service to Rugby Union.
- Monica Desmond Penny. For public service.
- Helen Bannister Philp. For services to the community.
- Pastor Ivan Lester Roennfeldt. For service to the Aboriginal people.
- Enid Tardent (Mrs. Enid Margaret Fogarty). For service to music and the community.
- William Jesse Wolff. For service to the community.

State of South Australia

- The Honourable Maynard Boyd Dawkins, MLC. For service to choral music.
- Heinrich Diestel-Feddersen. For services to the potato industry and the German community.
- Roberto Mario Antonio Masi. For services to the Italian community.
- Ronald Hannaford Sedsman. For services to the Royal Adelaide Show.
- Lionel Garth Sims. For services to local government and the community.
- Aileen Martha Wilson. For services to the Aboriginal community.

State of Western Australia

- Leslie George Clarke. For service to the community.
- John Talbot Hunn. For service to scouting.
- William Howard King. For public service.
- Albert John Pepperell. For service to industry.
- William Rupert Stevens. For service to the vegetable industry.

State of Tasmania

- Margaret Frances Elliston. For services to the Girl Guide movement.
- Douglas Lindsay Youd. For service to the sport of wood chopping.

=== Companion of the Imperial Service Order (ISO) ===
Home Civil Service

- Robert McGregor Airlie, Principal Civil Engineer, Department of the Environment.
- John William Auger, Principal, Department of Industry.
- David Henry Bayes, lately Senior Principal, Scottish Office.
- Duncan Hamilton Cameron, Principal Scientific Officer, Ministry of Defence.
- John Henry Chapman, lately Principal Professional and Technology Officer, Ministry of Defence.
- Maurice Cooper, Principal, Department of Health and Social Security.
- William Henry Drew, Principal Professional and Technology Officer, Ministry of Defence.
- Leslie Ernest George, lately Principal Scientific Officer, Ministry of Agriculture, Fisheries and Food.
- Marjorie Catherine Gibbons, lately Principal, Welsh Office.
- Patrick Albert Grove, Inspector of Taxes, Board of Inland Revenue.
- Kathleen Alma Hyde, Principal, Department of Employment.
- James Alan Bell Hyndman, lately Senior Principal, Department of the Environment for Northern Ireland.
- Ronald Jolley, lately Principal, Lord Chancellor's Department.
- Geoffrey Lord, Principal, Department of Transport.
- Cyril Douglas Thomas Mansfield, DFM, Principal, Department of Trade.
- John William George Musty, Senior Principal Scientific Officer, Ancient Monuments Laboratory, Department of the Environment.
- Barbara Joan Parkin, Principal, Department of Energy.
- Jean Phillips, Principal, Crown Estate Commissioners.
- Godfrey Thomas John Pullan, Senior Principal Scientific Officer, Ministry of Defence.
- Leslie Cuthbert Smith, Principal, Victoria & Albert Museum.
- Anthony Sreeves, Inspector, Board of Inland Revenue.
- Alexander Steel, Inspector, Board of Inland Revenue.
- Raymond Stoodley, lately Professional and Technical Superintending Grade, Home Office.
- Clifford Taylor, Principal, Ministry of Defence.
- Dennis Williamson, Principal, Department of Health and Social Security.

Diplomatic Service and Overseas List

- Patrick Joseph Clancy, QPM, CPM, lately Senior Assistant Commissioner, Royal Hong Kong Police Force.
- Alan John Stockman Lack, Deputy Director of Marine, Hong Kong.
- Alan Kenneth Mason, Principal Assistant Secretary, Security Branch, Hong Kong.
- James Milton Murphie, Assistant Director of Immigration, Hong Kong.

Australian States

State of Queensland

- James William John Griffin. For public service.

State of South Australia

- Stuart Beaumont Hart. For public service in town planning.

State of Western Australia

- Bruce James Beggs. For public service in forestry.

=== British Empire Medal (BEM) ===
Military Division

Royal Navy

- Chief Petty Officer (OPS) (MW) Roy Attenborough, Royal Navy Reserve, KD985550D.
- Colour Sergeant William. Alexander John Baxter, Royal Marines, PO22404J.
- Chief Petty Officer (C.A.S.) James Bremner, F669840J.
- Chief Weapon Engineering Mechanic (O) Frank George Brookes, Royal Naval Reserve, XD986173H.
- Chief Petty Officer (Seaman) Charles Henry Came, J162677J.
- Marine Engineering Artificer (P) First Class Alexander Terence Chadwick, D055121L.
- Sergeant Norman Clark, Royal Marines, PO20837U.
- Chief Petty Officer (Seaman) Laurence Lyall Curle, D159779P.
- Master at Arms Kenneth Arthur Etheridge, M714511X.
- Marine Engineering Mechanician (P) First Class William Davenport Fraser, D159834G.
- Chief Petty Officer Steward Adrian Robin Frost, D079076F.
- Colour Sergeant Hugh Gray, Royal Marines, PO20233T.
- Chief Communications Yeoman Terry Henry Green, Royal Naval Reserve, QD982304L.
- Weapon Engineering Mechanician First Class Anthony Campbell Jones, D159778X.
- Chief Petty Officer Airman (AH) William Hugh Jones, F849811A.
- Marine Engineering Mechanician (L) First Class Anthony John Marriott, D051138A.
- Chief Petty Officer (Seaman) Douglas Graham Plymsol, J982549L.
- Chief Petty Officer (CAS) Alan Richardson, J646039G.
- Petty Officer Medical Assistant John Rigby, D073176G.
- Chief Petty Officer Stores Accountant Thomas Arthur Scott, D079679Q.
- Senior Naval Nurse Marion Rebecca Stock, Queen Alexandra's Royal Naval Nursing Service.
- Weapon Engineering Artificer First Class Anthony John Tickner, D128157E.
- Chief Wren Radio Supervisor Kathleen Sheila Jennifer Vince, Women's Royal Naval Service, W123370X.
- Colour Sergeant Alwyn Brian Young, Royal Marines, PO15613K.

Army

- 23877480 Sergeant (Acting Staff Sergeant) David Alexander Allen, Irish Guards.
- 24266740 Sergeant Trevor Geoffrey Allison, Royal Army Ordnance Corps.
- 23834196 Staff Sergeant Victor Amaira, Corps of Royal Electrical and Mechanical Engineers.
- 24149491 Staff Sergeant George Frank Arthur Angell, Royal Corps of Signals, Territorial Army.
- 24030488 Staff Sergeant Joseph Aquilina, Royal Corps of Signals.
- 24147072 Sergeant (Acting Staff Sergeant) Roger Axten, Corps of Royal Engineers.
- 24106125 Corporal (Local Sergeant) Jack William Bardle, Royal Corps of Transport.
- 24278712 Sergeant Robert Charles Barfield, Royal Pioneer Corps.
- 23982572 Staff Sergeant Paul Barrett, The Devonshire and Dorset Regiment.
- 23305239 Staff Sergeant (now Acting Warrant Officer Class 2) Herbert Robert Bartlett, 16th/5th The Queen's Royal Lancers.
- 24179750 Sergeant Alan Behenna, Corps of Royal Engineers.
- 22036400 Sergeant John Bennett, Royal Army Ordnance Corps, Territorial Army.
- 24145408 Sergeant Martin Joseph Brown, Royal Army Ordnance Corps.
- 22839215 Staff Sergeant Arthur John Budge, Wessex Regiment, Territorial Army.
- 24077288 Staff Sergeant George William Burroughs, Corps of Royal Engineers.
- 23859018 Corporal Alexander Victor Carson, Corps of Royal Engineers, Territorial Army.
- 24264640 Staff Sergeant Alan Henry Chapman, Corps of Royal Electrical and Mechanical Engineers.
- 23858622 Sergeant Anthony Clegg, Corps of Royal Electrical and Mechanical Engineers.
- 23749192 Sergeant Kenneth Coatesworth, Royal Corps of Signals.
- 24266750 Corporal Malcolm Adrian Connop, The Royal Green Jackets.
- 23675255 Staff Sergeant Peter Mark Cook, Corps of Royal Electrical and Mechanical Engineers.
- LS/23677211 Staff Sergeant (Local Warrant Officer Class 2) Peter John Cosgrove, The Parachute Regiment.
- LS/23469151 Staff Sergeant (Local Warrant Officer Class 2) David John Coxall, 16th/5th The Queen's Royal Lancers.
- LS/22742049 Staff Sergeant (Local Warrant Officer Class 2) John Dinnen, Royal Army Medical Corps, Territorial Army.
- 22343980 Staff Sergeant Jeremy John Eales, The Honourable Artillery Company, Territorial Army.
- 24328809 Corporal Paul Desmond Faithfull, Corps of Royal Engineers.
- 24083527 Sergeant Michael John Handsley, Corps of Royal Electrical and Mechanical Engineers.
- 24063654 Sergeant Michael John Harden, Royal Tank Regiment.
- 23820690 Sergeant (Acting Staff Sergeant) William Henderson, Royal Corps of Signals.
- 23917913 Sergeant Trevor Patrick Hope, Royal Regiment of Artillery.
- 23727206 Gunner (Acting Bombardier) Ernest Vincent Johnson, Royal Regiment of Artillery, Territorial Army.
- 23924900 Lance Corporal Emlyn Dewi Jones, The Queen's Regiment.
- 24079315 Staff Sergeant (Acting Warrant Officer Class 2) Peter Joseph McCoy, Army Catering Corps.
- 23479621 Staff Sergeant Ivor Noel McFadyen, 51st Highland Volunteers, Territorial Army.
- 23918020 Sergeant John Alexander McKnight, Royal Corps of Transport, Territorial Army.
- 24145577 Staff Sergeant Ian Joseph Mellor, Army Physical Training Corps.
- 24126237 Staff Sergeant David John Moon, Corps of Royal Electrical and Mechanical Engineers.
- 24019917 Sergeant Leonard James Moore, Corps of Royal Engineers.
- 22136031 Staff Sergeant Frederick Donald Morgan, Royal Corps of Transport, Territorial Army.
- 24104663 Staff Sergeant William Norris, The King's Own Royal Border Regiment.
- 23873258 Sergeant Albert Richard Olde, The Devonshire and Dorset Regiment.
- LS/23221534 Staff Sergeant (Local Warrant Officer Class 2) William John Kerr Paterson, The Argyll and Sutherland Highlanders (Princess Louise's).
- 24106699 Staff Sergeant Darryl Leslie Joseph Pooley, Royal Corps of Transport.
- 21159392 Sergeant Dilkishor Rai, 2nd King Edward VIIs Own Gurkha Rifles (The Sirmoor Rifles).
- 23982516 Staff Sergeant David George Rose, Corps of Royal Military Police.
- 21158907 Sergeant Dorjee Sherpa, 7th Duke of Edinburgh's Own Gurkha Rifles.
- 24132974 Corporal Patrick Joseph Simpson, Royal Pioneer Corps.
- 23536636 Corporal (Local Sergeant) Anthony Thomas Sims, Corps of Royal Military Police.
- 23612769 Sergeant John Whitcombe Smith, Corps of Royal Electrical and Mechanical Engineers.
- 24100830 Sergeant Peter Alfred Stewart Smith, Corps of Royal Electrical and Mechanical Engineers.
- 24186691 Staff Sergeant Christopher James Sockett, Army Catering Corps.
- 24059141 Sergeant Brian Stevens, The Light Infantry.
- 24048524 Staff Sergeant Gavin Neil Macleod Stoddart, The Royal Highland Fusiliers (Princess Margaret's Own Glasgow and Ayrshire Regiment).
- 23834480 Corporal Robert Gary Story, Royal Corps of Signals.
- 23504026 Sergeant Athlyn Taylor, Royal Corps of Signals.
- 23495367 Lance Sergeant (Acting Sergeant) John Taylor, Irish Guards.
- 23905935 Staff Sergeant Richard James Todd, 13th/18th Royal Hussars (Queen Mary's Own).
- 24225239 Staff Sergeant Stephen Tuck, Grenadier Guards.
- 24011291 Sergeant David Leonard Walton, Royal Regiment of Artillery.
- 24082353 Staff Sergeant (Acting Warrant Officer Class 2) Michael Frederick Westley, Royal Regiment of Artillery.
- 23862287 Staff Sergeant (Acting Warrant Officer Class 2) Francis Michael Whiteside, Royal Army Medical Corps.
- 24048330 Staff Corporal (Acting Warrant Officer Class 2) Derek William Willis, The Life Guards.
- 24281743 Lance Corporal (Acting Corporal) John Brian Wilson, The Royal Welch Fusiliers.
- 24181281 Sergeant Martyn Hamilton Woods, Royal Regiment of Artillery.

Overseas Awards

- Lance Corporal Ying-tang Lau, Royal Hong Kong Regiment (The Volunteers).
- Sergeant Kwok-hung Leung, Royal Hong Kong Regiment (The Volunteers).

Royal Air Force

- X4079582 Flight Sergeant John Kennedy Anderson.
- J4266712 Flight Sergeant Roy William Bennett.
- G4112638 Flight Sergeant Michael Rodney Counsell.
- L1928492 Flight Sergeant George Edward Gill.
- J4253539 Flight Sergeant Eric Holt.
- S4242345 Flight Sergeant David Fainges Johnston.
- D5035911 Flight Sergeant James McInally.
- Q1924619 Flight Sergeant Albert Derek Morris.
- N3147237 Flight Sergeant Michael John Plume.
- N4253854 Flight Sergeant Michael Francis Shaw.
- X4259991 Flight Sergeant Michael Steel.
- E4256158 Flight Sergeant Robert Lindsay Thomson.
- Y0688753 Chief Technician John Gillan Frederick Barnes.
- C4285302 Chief Technician Alister Brown Haveron.
- Q1944155 Chief Technician Anthony John Reeves Knight.
- P1934202 Chief Technician Malcolm Roy Myers.
- B1942036 Chief Technician Peter Frederick Riches.
- M1932638 Chief Technician Robert Henry Thompson.
- F1943733 Chief Technician John Francis Thornley.
- M1936839 Sergeant John Henry Gear.
- E4254083 Sergeant Alastair Steven Picton.
- F1947147 Sergeant Morris James Watt.

Civil Division

United Kingdom

- William Adams, Postman, Edinburgh Head Post Office, The Post Office.
- Samuel Ball Addis, Senior Foreman Trades Officer, Northern Ireland Prison Service.
- John Henry Allen, Technical Officer, Exeter Telephone Area, British Telecom.
- Eileen Virginia Ashton, Chief Photoprinter, HM Stationery Office.
- Bernard Richard Askew, P.S.V. One Man Operator, East Midland Motor Services Ltd.
- Raymond Arthur Atfield, Installation Technician, Studio Capital Projects Department, British Broadcasting Corporation.
- Hector William Baikie, Professional and Technology Officer III (Mechanical and Electrical), Department of the Environment.
- Marjorie Winifred Agnes Bailey, Centre Organiser, Southend-on-Sea, Essex Branch, British Red Cross Society.
- Stephen John Ball, Sergeant Major, Northern Ireland Division, Corps of Commissionaires.
- Nirmal Singh Bansal, Clerk of Works LE1, Property Services Agency, Department of the Environment.
- Eric Charles Barden. For services to the community in Dartford, Kent.
- Frank Robert Barlow, Sub-postmaster, Hackney Road, The Post Office.
- Jack Barnes, Petty Officer, Overseas Containers Ltd.
- Pamela Margaret Bean, Sub-postmistress, Terminus Road, Brighton, The Post Office.
- Roger Beck, Fireman, Derbyshire Fire Service.
- Francis Joseph Beetham, Setter "A", Ministry of Defence.
- Lucy May Bellamy. For services to disabled people in Hull.
- Griffith Beery, Mechanical Inspector, Wythenshawe Division, Ferranti Computer Systems Ltd.
- Frank Betts, Process and General Supervisor Grade D, Ministry of Defence.
- Eric Walter Bird, Foundry Moulder (Leading Hand), Baker Perkins Ltd.
- Bruce Edward Birdsell, Steel Fixer, Costain Thompson Houston Ltd.
- Leslie Boddy, Town Hall Superintendent, Lord Mayor's Sergeant, Sheriff's Officer and Mace Bearer, Oxford City Council.
- Glennis Hetha Bosher. For services to children in Swansea.
- Joyce, Lydia Boxley. For services to the community in Dudley, West Midlands.
- Louis George Moody Brown, Engineer, U.I.E. Shipbuilding (Scotland) Ltd.
- Arthur Hammond Browne. For services to poultry keeping in Norfolk.
- Archibald Hugh MacDonald Burnie, Farm Manager, Achnacloich.
- Gordon Robertson Burr. For services to the community in Tongue and district.
- Leslie Butler, Centre Organiser, Dudley Branch, British Red Cross Society.
- Olive Butler, Steward, Members' Mess Club, Lancashire County Council.
- George Stanley Buxton, Constable, Northamptonshire Police.
- Colin James Bygrave, Professional and Technology Officer Grade III, Ministry of Defence.
- Gwendoline Violet Caldicutt, Cleaner, Weston-under-Penyard VA Primary School, Ross-on-Wye.
- Michael Honeyman Campbell, Bible Class Organiser, HM Prison Edinburgh.
- Antonis Anastasi Carantonis, Relief Station Inspector, London Transport.
- William Arthur Card, Site Foreman, Hall Thermo-tank International Ltd. For Services to Export.
- Charles Malcolm Cation, Staff Foreman, National Steel Foundry (1914) Ltd., Leven.
- Joseph Thomas Cattell, Senior Machine Shop Foreman, GKN Sankey Ltd.
- Victor Leonard Chandler, Chief Petty Officer Instructor, Hull Unit, Sea Cadet Corps.
- James Edward Chapman, Roadman, North Yorkshire County Council.
- Alfred Chappory, Sub-Officer, Fire Section, Ministry of Defence.
- Geoffrey Arnold Clay, Constable, Staffordshire Police.
- Fred Cole, Chauffeur, Aycliffe and Peterlee Development Corporations.
- Matthew Clyde Coles, Sub-Officer, Cambridgeshire Fire and Rescue Service.
- Royston Keith Coles, Senior Photographer, Ministry of Defence.
- Eric Henry Collins, Toolmaker, Lucas Electrical Ltd.
- Alan George Cook, Garden Supervisor, Royal Botanic Gardens, Kew.
- Marion Violet Cornwall, Cashier, Mitcheldean, Rank Xerox Manufacturing Operations.
- Esther Coxon, Local Organiser, Gateshead Metropolitan District, Women's Royal Voluntary Service.
- William Cree, Foreman Grade 1, North Eastern Electricity Board.
- Frederick Croome, lately Development Worker, Calverton Colliery, South Nottinghamshire Area, National Coal Board.
- Ronald Charles Cross, Sergeant, Metropolitan Police.
- Marjorie Claire Mary Culley, Member, Bristol City, Women's Royal Voluntary Service.
- Robert Alan Cunningham, Bus Driver, Ulsterbus Ltd.
- Phyllis Delphia Cutts. For services to the community, particularly to Barnsley Hospitals.
- Matthew William Daley, Driver, Hartlepool, Eastern Region, British Rail.
- Elias Davies, Gatekeeper, Grand Lodge, Penrhyn Castle, The National Trust.
- May Davies, Foster Parent, Mid-Glamorgan County Council.
- Ronald John Davies, Chargehand, Shrewsbury Tool & Die Company Ltd.
- Thomas Davies, Foreman Blockmaker, Royal Doulton Tableware Ltd.
- Kenneth Norman Denham. For services to the National Association of Boy's Clubs in Chesham, Buckinghamshire.
- John Edmund David Denver, Craft Attendant, Band 2, Southern Electricity Board.
- Ivor Gordon Dodd, Sub Officer, Cornwall County Fire Brigade.
- Dorothy Violet Dudman, lately Driver, London H.Q., St. John Ambulance.
- Henry Douglas Eade, Foreign and Commonwealth Office.
- Douglas Elias George Emery, DCM, Revenue Constable, Board of Customs and Excise.
- Frank Faulkner, lately Professional and Technology Officer III, Ministry of Defence.
- Archibald Ferguson, Chargehand Craft Auxiliary B, Scottish Development Department.
- Sydney Finnigan, Professional and Technology Officer III, Engineering Services Branch, Winfrith, United Kingdom Atomic Energy Authority.
- Anthony Allenby Ford, Gas Distribution Supervisor, Ipswich District, Eastern Region, British Gas Corporation.
- Dennis Royal Fordham, Sewage Operations Foreman, Anglian Water Authority.
- Gordon Gilbert Foster, Face Worker, North Nottinghamshire Area, National Coal Board.
- Harold Foster, Porter, Royal National Orthopaedic Hospital, Stanmore.
- Albert Franklin. For services to the Royal British Legion in Northamptonshire.
- Barbara Simpson Fraser, Chargehand Telephone Switchboard Operator, Dounreay, United Kingdom Atomic Energy Authority.
- Walter Frear. For services to the Guild of Vergers.
- Joseph Fryer, Prison Officer, HM Prison Wormwood Scrubs.
- George Peter Gabriele, Leader, St. Mary's Boys' Club, Newcastle upon Tyne.
- Harry Gandy, Dock Foreman, Stalbridge Dock, Garston.
- Fred Garner, Resident Porter, Sir Thomas More Estate, Chelsea.
- Charles William George Gazzard, Professional and Technology Officer IV, Meteorological Office.
- Cecil Charles Gennery, Production Superintendent, Rists Ltd.
- Lewis Charles Gibbs, Foreign and Commonwealth Office.
- Bernard Gilfoyle, Bulk Tanker Driver, Rank Hovis Ltd.
- Sardara Singh Gill, Foreman, Light Machine Shop, Marconi Radar Systems Ltd.
- Trevor Edward Goodingham, Sergeant, Metropolitan Police.
- Cecil Graham, Driver, Mobil Oil Company Ltd., Belfast.
- Michael Harvey Gray, Constable, Hampshire Constabulary.
- Thomas Gray, Face Worker, Holditch Colliery, Western Area, National Coal Board.
- Nathaniel Thomas Green, Coastguard Officer 1, Sector Officer, Cromer, HM Coastguard, Department of Trade.
- William James Grey, Auxiliary Constable, Royal Ulster Constabulary.
- Rachel Vera Griffiths, District Staff, Ceredigion, Dyfed, Women's Royal Voluntary Service.
- Laurence Grogan, Chairman, Joint Union Negotiation Committee, Arthur Guinness & Company Ltd., Transport and General Workers Union.
- Mabel Mary Pilar Haigh, Local Organiser, Elland, West Yorkshire, Women's Royal Voluntary Service.
- Joan Mary Harding, for services to the community in Pensford, Bristol.
- Arthur Hardman, Installation Inspector, Stalybridge District, North Western Electricity Board.
- Peter Ballingall Hart, Cork Maker, Remploy Ltd., Hillington.
- Vernon Eynon Hart, Surface Labourer, St. John's Colliery, South Wales Area, National Coal Board.
- Herbert George Harvey, lately Sergeant Major Instructor, Avon, Army Cadet Force.
- Ronald Reginald Brook Harvey, Manager, HMS Fisgard, Navy, Army and Air Force Institutes.
- Stanley Hastings, Packer Leader, Strip Mill Products, Shotton Works, British Steel Corporation.
- Mavis Sidonie Hedger, Chief Woman Observer, No. 7 Group Bedford, Royal Observer Corps.
- Leonard Henry, Safety Officer, Walker Yard, Swan Hunter Shipbuilders Ltd.
- Mary Herbert. For services to the community in Ebbw Vale.
- Frederick George Basil Hillier, General Foreman, John Laing Construction Ltd.
- Bertram George Hinnells, MM, Forester, Marlesford Estate, Woodbridge, Suffolk.
- Harold James Holmes, Constable, Merseyside Police.
- Arthur Sydney Huckfield, Foreman Toolsetter, Abingdon King Dick Ltd.
- Alfred Henry Hughes, Washmiller, Qay Quarry, Westbury Works, Blue Circle Industries plc.
- Ronald Miller Hunter, Constable, Metropolitan Police.
- John Bowe Johnson, Chief Officer II, Medomsley Detention Centre.
- Richard Johnson, Senior Foreman, Production Laboratory, Vickers Instruments.
- Sydney Neven Johnson, Supervisor, Department of Agriculture for Northern Ireland.
- Edward Johnston, Sports Attendant, Glencairn Secondary School, Belfast.
- John Jones, Secretary, Rockware Glass Company Branch, Transport and General Workers Union.
- Owen Jones, Forest Craftsman, Forestry Commission.
- William Albert Jones, Principal Range Superintendent, Ministry of Defence.
- Ellen Kemp, lately Forewoman Cleaner, Metropolitan Police.
- William Francis Kilfedder, Foreman, Heavy Plant Workshops, F.J.C. Lilley plc.
- Winifred Ethel Flora Kinder. For services to the welfare of children in Cranbrook and Southborough, Kent.
- David James Kirk, Supervisor, Coalville, British Rail.
- Catherine Beryl Higgs Lewis. For services to the community in Bryncrug, Gwynedd.
- Eric George Lewis, Surveyor/Relief Supervisor, South Western Region, British Gas Corporation.
- Ernest Frederick Lewis, Storeman, Gaynes Hall Borstal.
- Thomas Lloyd, lately Ship Wright, Manchester Ship Canal Company.
- William Briggs Longbottom, Assistant Engineer, Maple Mill, Courtaulds Ltd.
- Joseph Ludkin, lately State Enrolled Nurse, Broadmoor Hospital, Department of Health and Social Security.
- Grace Eleanor Luxton, Canteen Worker, Medway Towns Unit, Sea Cadets Corps.
- James William McCafferey, Stores Supervisor, Stockport, North Western Region, British Gas Corporation.
- Herbert David McCammond, Maintenance Officer, Northern Ireland Housing Executive.
- Malcolm John MAcDonald, Farm Manager, Auch, Bridge of Orchy.
- Francis McGoff, Stores Supervisor, Clinical Research Centre, Medical Research Council.
- James Fraser McKenzie, Works Superintendent (Foreman), Water Supply Services, Lothian Regional Council.
- Malcolm MacLeod, Crofter, South Arnish, Raasay, Kyle.
- William McMahon, Foreign and Commonwealth Office.
- Bhola Maharaj Mansfield, Driver/Loader, Refuse Collection Service, Manchester City Council.
- Marjory Eileen Manton, Joint District Organiser, Horsham, West Sussex, Women's Royal Voluntary Service.
- Joyce Marriott, Home Help, Godstone, Surrey.
- Edward Thomas Frank Marsh, Stockman, North Cadbury, Yeovil, Somerset.
- Edward Joseph Martin, Civilian Instructor, Crawley Unit, Sea Cadet Corps.
- Alec Ashley Mason. For services to the Royal British Legion in Bratton, Wiltshire.
- Olive Mason, Member, Wilmslow, Women's Royal Voluntary Service.
- Joseph Edmund Megarry, Principal Officer, Northern Ireland Prison Service.
- Frederick Mellor, Trimming Sorter, Remploy Ltd., Salford.
- Phoebe May Mertens, Foster Parent, Birmingham Social Services Department.
- Robert Henry Messam, Fitter, Trent Motor Traction Company Ltd.
- Thomas Millar, Technician IIB, British Telecom.
- Dorothy Veronica Miller-Pierce, Divisional Officer, Metropolitan Special Constabulary.
- Geraldine Olive Mitchell. For services to the community in Thames Ditton, Surrey.
- Irene Monaghan, lately Housekeeper, Sheffield City Council.
- John Timothy Moriarty, Sub-Officer, London Fire Brigade.
- Margaret Agnes Muir, for services to the community, particularly the deaf, in Dumfries.
- Maurice Newberry, Sergeant, Royal Ulster Constabulary.
- Joseph Richard Newby, Resident Engineer and Caretaker, Shrewsbury College of Arts and Technology.
- Hilda Joan Noakes. For services to the British Red Cross Society in Berkshire.
- Mary Ellen O'Brien, Chief Paperkeeper, Home Office.
- Mary Ellen O'Hanlon, Nursing Auxiliary, Daisy Hill Hospital, Newry.
- Marjorie Alice Osgood. For services to the community in Stubbington, Hampshire.
- Eric William Palmer, Export Despatch Supervisor, B.D.H. Chemicals Ltd. For services to Export.
- John Edward Parker, Experimental Worker Grade II, Ministry of Defence.
- Alexander Cargill Paton, Station Officer, Forth Marine Rescue Sub-Centre, HM Coastguard, Department of Trade.
- Florence May Payne. For services to the community, particularly local hospitals, in Suffolk.
- William George Henry Payne, Chargehand, Despatch Department, Firsteel Ltd.
- Ronald Pearson, Assistant Gantryman, Strip Mill Products, Llanwern Works, British Steel Corporation.
- Albert Edward John Peel. For charitable services to the Swansea and West Wales Cancer Aid Society.
- Edgar Donald Peel, Chief Petty Officer (Pumpman), Esso Petroleum Company Ltd.
- Graham John Penny, Constable, South Wales Constabulary.
- Frank John Perkins, Steward 2, Ministry of Defence.
- Sydney William Phillips, Works Convenor, Chester Division, Aircraft Group, British Aerospace.
- Clifford Charles Pocknell, Sub-Officer, Hereford and Worcester Fire Brigade.
- Kenneth Pratt, Sub-Officer, Devon Fire Brigade.
- Roma Violet June Prebble, Chief Observer (W), No. 1 Group Maidstone, Royal Observer Corps.
- Thomas Primrose, Constable, Strathclyde Police.
- Leslie William Pugh, Senior Messenger, Department of the Environment.
- Ernest James Noel Radway, Process Supervisor, Chemical Plants, Springfields Works, British Nuclear Fuels Ltd.
- William John Buchanan Ramsay, Constable, Ministry of Defence Police.
- James Johnstone Reddiex, Senior Operator, Hot Strip Mill, Strip Mill Products, Ravenscraig Works, British Steel Corporation.
- James Arthur Reed, Supervisor, Access Control, Airport Security, Heathrow Airport, British Airports Authority.
- Harold William Reeve, Principal Quality Engineer, Quality Department, Stevenage Division, Dynamics Group, British Aerospace pic.
- William Percy Revell, Craftsman, Department of the Environment.
- Glyn Thelwell Roberts. Highways Superintendent, Melton Borough Council.
- Leslie Roberts, Chargeman, Cannon Street, South Eastern Division, Southern Region, British Rail.
- Wilfred Robinson. For services to Ellesmere Port Boat Museum.
- Joseph Robson, Craftsman (Fitting-Plant/ Vehicles), Central and South West Scotland Area, South of Scotland Electricity Board.
- Robert Robson, Bridges Supervising Foreman, Highways Department, Northumberland County Council.
- Phyllis Harrison Roderick. For services to the Order of St. John in Wales.
- Muriel Ellen Rogerson. For services to the community in Wawne, Humberside.
- Diana Patricia Ross, Cleaner, Ministry of Agriculture, Fisheries and Food.
- William George Albert Russett, Craftsman (Electrician), Rutherford Laboratory, Scientific and Engineering Research Council.
- Constance Irene Scholes. For services to the South East Regional Association for the Deaf.
- Sydney Richard Shea, Development Department Assistant, Hugh Mackay & Co. Ltd.
- Charles Fergus Simpson, Sergeant, Royal Ulster Constabulary.
- Edward Smith, Civilian Driving Instructor, Greater Manchester Police.
- Henry Gordon Smith, Storekeeper, Transport Department, Tingley, North Eastern Region, British Gas Corporation.
- Reginald Frank Philip Smith, Waterman and Turncock, Oadby Reservoir, Leicester, Severn Trent Water Authority.
- Ronald James Smith, Foreman Warehouseman, Sterling Wharfage Co. Ltd.
- Alice Southworth, Clothing Organiser, Darwen, Woman's Royal Voluntary Service.
- John William Borthwick Soutter, Driver/Handyman, Scottish Office.
- Peter Stagey, Experimental Worker II, Ministry of Defence.
- Hector Robert Steele, Assistant Commandant, Irvine B.R. Company, St. Andrews Ambulance Corps.
- Sybil Alice Heath Stevens, School Crossing Patrol, Metropolitan Police.
- Alfred Stewart, Craneman, Belfast Harbour Authority.
- Miles Stott, lately Superintendent, Guildhall, Londonderry.
- Ada Street, for charitable services to diabetic research.
- Rita Stuart, Cook, Fleming Cottage Hospital, Aberlour-on-Spey.
- Charles Summerhayes, Constable, Metropolitan Police.
- Peter Sutherland, Superintendent Depot Services, Ministry of Defence.
- Antony Benedict Sutton, Surveyor Senior Grade, Ordnance Survey.
- Walter Geoffrey Swift, Museum Foreman, Merseyside County Museum.
- Betty Symons, Process and General Supervisory Grade "C", Ministry of Defence.
- Timothy Neave Taylor, Auxiliary in Charge, Mablethorpe, HM Coastguard.
- George Henry Terry, Professional and Technology Officer IV, National Physical Laboratory.
- John Weston Thomas, Harp Maker, Wolfs Castle, Haverfordwest.
- Albert Ernest Thompson, Technician III, National Maritime Museum.
- Ebenezer Turner, Coalman, S.A. Williams, Dudley.
- William Wallace, Senior Railman, Glasgow, British Rail.
- Ellis Thomas Wells, Sheet Metal Worker, Warton Division Aircraft Group, British Aerospace pic.
- Bertie Cyril William Westrop, Progress Controller, Plessey Avionics & Communications Ltd.
- Tom Whalley, Decorating Manager, J. E. Heath Ltd.
- Raymond John Wheeler, Production Worker I, Ministry of Defence.
- Maisie Emily Wiley, House Foreman, Central Premises, British Broadcasting Corporation.
- Henry William John Willett, Office Keeper II, Department of Industry.
- Percy Williams, Manager of Transport Property Maintenance, A. Darlington (Heswall) Ltd.
- William Frederick Williams, Chairman, Longmynd Adventure Camp, Shropshire.
- Thomas William Willingale, Model Shop Controller, Racal Mobilcal Ltd. For services to Export.
- Frederick John Edgar Willis, Senior Paper Keeper, Lord Chancellor's Department.
- Edward Thomas Willman, Ambulance Driver, Avonmouth Docks, Port of Bristol Authority.
- Henry Wilkinson Wilson, Ship Plater, Tyne Shiprepair Ltd.
- Kenneth Winter, Relief Signalman (G.P.R.) Class 2, Western Region, British Rail.
- Sydney Wood, Coal Merchant, Newton Aycliffe New Town.
- Arthur Richard Woolley, lately Fireman, London Fire Brigade.
- John Anthony Wragg, Craftsman 1, Department of Employment.
- William John Francis Young, lately Examiner II (Industrial), Ministry of Defence.

Overseas Territories

- Rudolph Hodge. For public services in the British Virgin Islands.
- Koon-fat Hung, Senior Customs Officer, Customs and Excise Service, Hong Kong.
- Wanda Wan-wah Lee, Health Auxiliary, Medical and Health Department, Hong Kong.
- Raphael Felipe Mifsud, Telecommunications Officer, Telephone Department, Gibraltar.
- Pedro do Rozario, Principal Officer, Correctional Services Department, Hong Kong.
- Frank Harold Warwick, Technical Officer, Public Works Department, Gibraltar.

Australian States

State of Queensland

- Helen Louisa Alice Bunyan. For service to the community.
- Robert George Patrick Davis. For service to the community.
- Lorraine Daphne Decker. For service to sport.
- Noel Lisle Land. For service to the Returned Services League and the community.
- Myrine Esma Maker. For service to the community.
- Elizabeth Ann Marchant. For service to the community.
- Paul Eliott Newman. For service to the community.
- Edith Olive Perry. For service to the community.
- Grainger Goyne Rothwell. For service to the community.
- Noel Paul Stanaway. For service to boating.

State of South Australia

- George William Battye. For service to the community.
- Alfreda Olive Day. For service to the arts.
- Charles John Gardner. For services to the Returned Services League.
- Leslie Raymund Hill. For services to local history.
- David Thomas Lloyd. For services to the community.
- Shirley Nolan. For services to ancillary school organisations.
- Robert Stanley Edmund Robins. For services to Cleland Conservation Park.

State of Western Australia

- Joseph James Higgins. For services to the community.
- Patrine Howden, JP. For service to the community.
- Kathleen Mary Johnson. For service to nursing.
- Carmel Olive Moore. For service to the community.
- Christopher George Seymour. For service to the community.
- Brenda Patricia Warwick Wittenoom. For service to the community.

State of Tasmania

- Kenneth Hume Hawkins. For service to local government.
- Miriam Evelyn O'Toole. For service to the community.
- Ivan Short. For service to sport and local government.

Bar to the British Empire Medal
United Kingdom

- Sidney John Hooper, BEM, lately Resident Engineer, British Insurance Association Headquarters.

=== Royal Red Cross (RRC) ===
- Lieutenant Colonel Noeleen Margaret Braisby, MBE, (467025), Queen Alexandra's Royal Army Nursing Corps.
- Colonel Jean Veronica Grieve, ARRC, (444021), Queen Alexandra's Royal Army Nursing Corps.

==== Associate of the Royal Red Cross (ARRC) ====
- Senior Nursing Officer Barbara Anne Johnson, Queen Alexandra's Royal Naval Nursing Service.
- Superintending Nursing Officer Jane Hathway Marshall, Queen Alexandra's Royal Naval Nursing Service.
- Superintending Nursing Officer Brenda Anne Powell, Queen Alexandra's Royal Naval Nursing Service.
- Superintending Nursing Officer Fiona Penelope Smith, Queen Alexandra's Royal Naval Nursing Service.
- Superintending Nursing Officer Claire Mavis Taylor, Queen Alexandra's Royal Naval Nursing Service.
- Major Hilary Stephanie Dixon-Nuttall (473186), Queen Alexandra's Royal Army Nursing Corps.
- Squadron Leader Ann Beryl Golding (407653), Princess Mary's Royal Air Force Nursing Service.
- Squadron Leader Isabella Ellen King (407537), Princess Mary's Royal Air Force Nursing Service.
- Squadron Leader Valerie Diane Wright (408292), Princess Mary's Royal Air Force Nursing Service.

=== Air Force Cross (AFC) ===
Army

- Lieutenant Colonel Peter Rodney Carter (426843), Army Air Corps.

Royal Air Force

- Wing Commander Timothy Gane Thorn (608332).
- Squadron Leader Keith William Ifould (4232498).
- Squadron Leader Joseph Patrick L'Estrange, AFM, (3041026).
- Squadron Leader Hector Gavin MacKay (2616088).
- Squadron Leader David George Miller Wright (1608638).
- Flight Lieutenant Byron Stephen Walters (8025401).
- Master Air Electronics Operator Peter Edward Sampson (M3509322).

Bar to the Air Force Cross

- Squadron Leader Bruce Anthony Donald McKenzie McDonald, AFC, (4036925).

=== Queen's Commendation for Valuable Service in the Air ===
Royal Air Force

- Wing Commander Richard John Wharmby (684896).
- Squadron Leader Albert James Cann (4086019).
- Squadron Leader David Ronald Gasson (5200733).
- Squadron Leader Leslie Hakin (4256441).
- Squadron Leader Ian Hodson, (8024786).
- Squadron Leader Robert Douglas Lapraik (5200618).
- Squadron Leader Thomas William Rimmer (2619749).
- Squadron Leader Iain Clunie Ross (608700).
- Squadron Leader John Joshua Whitfield (4232467).
- Flight Lieutenant Jack Allen (4114517).
- Flight Lieutenant Russell George Braithwaite (4230269).
- Flight Lieutenant Alan Roy Foster (5201111).
- Flight Lieutenant Gaylon Brian Horning (582839).
- Flight Lieutenant Murdo MacDonald MacLeod (8025506).
- Flight Lieutenant Lawrence Leslie John McCready (8026256).
- Flight Lieutenant Dennis Frederick Southern (4112531).

United Kingdom

- Robert Strachan Pogson, Senior Flight Test Engineer, Manchester Division, Woodford Aircraft Group, British Aerospace plc.

=== Queen's Police Medal (QPM) ===
England and Wales

- Gerald George Atfield, Chief Superintendent, Surrey Constabulary.
- Norman Barton, lately Commander, Metropolitan Police.
- Robin Victor Brooker, Chief Superintendent, Sussex Police.
- Douglas Haig Cree, Commander, Metropolitan Police.
- Donald Elliott, Deputy Chief Constable, Greater Manchester Police.
- Barbara Gale, Superintendent, Merseyside Police.
- Hugh Victor Dudley Hallett, Assistant Chief Constable, Kent Constabulary.
- Donald John Hanson, Deputy Assistant Commissioner, Metropolitan Police.
- Roderick Jones, Chief Superintendent, South Yorkshire Police.
- Peter David Joslin, Deputy Chief Constable, Warwickshire Constabulary.
- Kenneth Hirst Ogram, Chief Constable, British Transport Police.
- John Edwin Over, Chief Constable, Gwent Constabulary.
- Andrew Kirkpatrick Sloan, Deputy Chief Constable, Lincolnshire Police.
- Alan Vickers, Assistant Chief Constable, West Mercia Constabulary.
- Peter John Westley, Commander, Metropolitan Police.

Northern Ireland

- William Nicholl, Superintendent, Royal Ulster Constabulary.

Scotland

- James Archibald Baxter, Detective Chief Superintendent, Strathclyde Police, and Commander, Scottish Crime Squad.
- Peter McBride Fisher, Chief Superintendent, Strathclyde Police.

Overseas Territories

- Peter John Clarke, CPM, Assistant Commissioner, Royal Hong Kong Police Force.
- Stanley Valentine Franks, Commissioner of Police, St. Kitts-Nevis.
- Charles Derek Mayger, CPM, Chief Superintendent, Royal Hong Kong Police Force.
- Edmund James Edworthy Stowers, Commissioner of Police, Cayman Islands.

Australian States

State of Queensland

- Henry Hugh Doull. Superintendent, Queensland Police Force.

State of South Australia

- Laurence Norton McEvoy. Superintendent, South Australian Police Force.

=== Queen's Fire Services Medal (QFSM) ===
England and Wales

- Harold Robert Charles Boyce, Assistant Chief Officer, London Fire Brigade.
- Bryan Thomas Alfred Collins, Chief Officer, Humberside Fire Brigade.
- Edward Spencer Faulkner, Chief Officer, Hertfordshire Fire Brigade.
- Gordon Frank Henry Mitchell, Chief Officer, Army Fire Service.
- Roger Carlton Paramor, Chief Officer, Essex County Fire Brigade.
- John Spence, Chief Officer, Warwickshire County Fire Service.

Overseas Territories

- Montague Kingdom, CPM, Chief Fire Officer, Hong Kong Fire Brigade.
- John Howard March, CPM, Chief Fire Officer, Hong Kong Fire Brigade.

=== Colonial Police Medal (CPM) ===
- Patrick Edward Birney, Senior Superintendent, Royal Hong Kong Police Force.
- George David Brooke, Superintendent, Royal Hong Kong Police Force.
- Fong Chan, Assistant Divisional Officer, Hong Kong Fire Services.
- Kwok-yin Chan, Chief Inspector, Royal Hong Kong Police Force.
- Pui-shing Chow, Divisional Officer, Hong Kong Fire Services.
- Barrie Joseph Deegan, Senior Superintendent, Royal Hong Kong Police Force.
- Leonardo John Harteam, Chief Inspector, Royal Hong Kong Auxiliary Police Force.
- Yuk-kuen Lau, Superintendent, Royal Hong Kong Police Force.
- Hoi-ching Lee, Station Sergeant, Royal Hong Kong Police Force.
- Kwok-chiu Lee, Divisional Officer, Hong Kong Fire Services.
- Pui Ling, Sergeant, Royal Hong Kong Auxiliary Police Force.
- Kwong-yee Ma, Chief Inspector, Royal Hong Kong Police Force.
- Benjamin William Munford, Superintendent, Royal Hong Kong Police Force.
- Peter Graham Oakey, Senior Superintendent, Royal Hong Kong Police Force.
- Robert Allan Porter, Senior Superintendent, Royal Hong Kong Police Force.
- David Smith, Chief Inspector, Gibraltar Police Force.
- Ki-kwong So, Station Sergeant, Royal Hong Kong Police Force.
- Wing-sun Tang, Station Sergeant, Royal Hong Kong Police Force.
- Siu-bun Wong, Chief Inspector, Royal Hong Kong Police Force.

== Australia ==
=== Knight Bachelor ===
- Robert David Garrick Agnew, CBE. For service to industry and commerce.
- Harold George Aston, CBE. For service to industry.
- James Schofield Balderstone. For service to primary industry and commerce.
- The Honourable Mr. Justice Richard Arthur Blackburn, OBE. For service to law.
- Harold Alexander Cuthbertson. For service to industry and the community.
- Ivor Henry Thomas Hele, CBE. For service to the arts.
- Reginald Byron Leonard, CMG, OBE. For service to the community.

=== Order of the Bath ===
==== Companion of the Order of the Bath (CB) ====
Civil Division

- Professor Peter Thomas Fink, CBE. For public service.
- Donald Neil Sanders. For public service and service to banking.

=== Order of Saint Michael and Saint George ===
==== Knight Commander of the Order of St Michael and St George (KCMG) ====
- The Honourable Sir Edward Stratten Williams, KBE. For service to sport, particularly the XIIth Commonwealth Games.
- Senator the Honourable Harold William Young. For parliamentary service.

==== Companion of the Order of St Michael and St George (CMG) ====
- Elizabeth Durack, OBE, (Mrs. Clancy). For service to art and literature.
- The Honourable Mr. Justice Michael Donald Kirby. For service to law.
- Denis Ashton Warner, OBE. For service to journalism.

=== Order of the British Empire ===
==== Dame Commander of the Order of the British Empire (DBE) ====
Civil Division

- Professor Leonie Judith Kramer, OBE. For service to literature and the public service.

==== Knight Commander of the Order of the British Empire (KBE) ====
Military Division

- Lieutenant General Phillip Harvey Bennett, AO, DSO, (57004), Chief of General Staff.

Civil Division

- The Most Reverend John Basil Rowland Grindrod. For service to religion.

==== Commander of the Order of the British Empire (CBE) ====
Military Division

- Rear Admiral Daryall Frederick Lynam (0710), Royal Australian Navy.
- Brigadier John Ashby Hooper (335028), Australian Staff Corps.
- Brigadier Keith Henry Kirkland (235027), Australian Staff Corps.

Civil Division

- Edward Jack Brighton. For service to banking.
- Doctor Pierre Patrick Gorman. For service to disabled people.
- Charles Christopher Halton. For public service.
- Ian William Johnson, OBE. For service to sport administration, particularly to cricket.
- William Allan McKinnon. For public service.
- Doctor Spiro Moraitis, OBE. For service to the ethnic community.
- Lois O'Donoghue, AM, (Mrs. Smart). For service to the Aboriginal community.
- John Peter Sim. For parliamentary service.

==== Officer of the Order of the British Empire (OBE) ====
Military Division

- Commander David Edward Clinch (0212), Royal Australian Navy.
- Lieutenant Colonel David Ernest Francis Bullard, ED, (3159602), Royal Australian Infantry.
- Lieutenant Colonel Alexander John George (214766), Royal Australian Infantry.
- Wing Commander Frank Edward Burtt (017778), Royal Australian Air Force.
- Wing Commander Richard Neil Kelloway (0221393), Royal Australian Air Force.

Civil Division

- Joan Letitia Arnold (Mrs. Thompson). For service to music.
- Doctor Susan Caroline Bambrick. For service to education in energy and resource economics.
- Neville James Bargwanna. For service to the meat industry.
- Andrew William Barr, MC, DFC. For service to the oilseed industry.
- Frank Henry Bedford. For community service.
- Thomas Kevin Bourke. For service to broadcasting engineering.
- Keith Oscar Bradshaw. For public service.
- Percy Rollo Brett. For public service.
- Nancie Ailsa, Lady Cameron. For community service.
- Kenneth Francis Cole, ED. For service to the oil industry and the community.
- Doctor Alban Harvey Gee. For service to medicine.
- Ronald Solley Gilbert. For public service.
- John Dawson Gitsham. For service to industry.
- Reginald Roy Grundy. For service to television.
- Frederic Peter Johns. For service to industry and the community.
- Doctor Peter James Bunworth Landy. For service to medicine.
- John Harold McCracken. For community service.
- Richard Brian McGruther. For service to sports administration and the community.
- Elizabeth Dorothy Manley. For service to advertising and to the community.
- Noel John Mason. For service to manufacturing and industrial relations.
- Edward Leo O'Brien. For service to the wool industry.
- Ronald Gordon Pate. For service to scouting and the community.
- Doctor Margaret Betty Raphael (Mrs. Burlace). For service to medicine and health care.
- Jonathan William Sanders. For services to yachting.
- Johannes Carl Schmidt. For service to industry and the community.
- Valerie Gwendoline Rhoda Swane. For service to horticulture.
- Edmund Marks Wolfe Visbord. For public service.

==== Member of the Order of the British Empire (MBE) ====
Military Division

Royal Australian Navy

- Lieutenant Commander Colin Clive Blennerhassett (02167).
- Lieutenant Commander Norman Allan McPherson (C61671).

Australian Army

- Captain (Temporary Major) John Neville Gratton (3176078), Royal Australian Army Ordnance Corps.
- Major Robert Vincent McEvoy (43740), Royal Regiment of Australian Artillery.
- Major Geoffrey Alan Nugent Morris (311582), Royal Australian Engineers.
- Major Kenneth James Willoughby, ED, (258968), Royal Australian Infantry.
- Major Raymond Wilson (34287), Royal Regiment of Australian Artillery.

Royal Australian Air Force

- Squadron Leader David Alan Davis (0221282).
- Squadron Leader Denis Marshall Greenwood (014435).
- Flight Lieutenant Helene Jones (N317026).
- Squadron Leader Adrian John Kemble (043498).

Civil Division

- Doctor Robert John Andrews. For service to disabled people.
- Gwendoline Mary Atherden. For service to the community.
- Michael George Barbouttis. For service to the Greek community.
- James Husband Barr Bell. For service to the building industry and the community.
- Stanley Lewis Brown. For service to broadcasting, and to music.
- Paul Coffa. For service to weightlifting.
- Ralph Francis Collins. For service to music broadcasting.
- Lisa Gaye Curry. For service to swimming.
- Harry Neville Cox. For community service.
- Clarence Mervyn Cutler. For community service.
- Herbert Henry Dawson. For service to country music and the community.
- Francois Robert de Castella. For service to athletics.
- Harold Leslie Dougherty. For public service.
- Donald Herbert Burnett Dyer. For service to public relations, industry and the community.
- Phyllis Mary Evans. For service to education.
- William John Murchie Ewing. For service to accountancy and the community.
- Michelle Jan Ford. For service to swimming.
- Edward Roy Freeman, DFC. For service to veterans.
- Alexander Frederick Fulcher. For service to cycling.
- Brian Huntly Gordon. For community service.
- Frederick Molyneux Gregory. For service to the community.
- Ruth Mary Gullett. For service to the National Estate.
- Nellie Blanche Hatton. For service to golf.
- Lieutenant-Colonel Laurence Jack Haydon (Retired List), ED. For community service.
- Merval Hannah Hoare. For service to literature.
- John Barnett Hollander. For service to baseball.
- Robert Alexander Dunlop Hood. For service to local government and the community.
- Dorothy Houghton. For service to the community and local government.
- Councillor Chilvers James Hutchings. For service to the community and local government.
- Paul Lorimer Johnstone. For service to the community and to education.
- Leonard Charles Lather. For public service.
- Harry Wheatley Le Marchant. For community service.
- Doctor Ronald Awstun Lewis. For service to medicine and the community.
- Keith William Logan. For community service.
- Francis Bernard Long. For public service.
- Allan Huistean McIntosh. For service to mining and the Aboriginal community.
- Ethel Maud Martin. For service to music.
- Alistair Gollan McKittrick Matheson. For service to religion and the community.
- Thomas Milner. For service to shipping and the community.
- Robert Neil Minniken. For service to sports administration.
- Stephen Charles Murphy. For service to local government.
- Leith Dothea Myerson. For community service.
- Decima Clara Norman (Mrs. Hamilton). For service to sport.
- Henry Max O'Halloran. For service to the community and to local government.
- Patricia Harrington Pinnell. For service to nursing and health.
- Keith Frank Poole. For service to bowls.
- Ethel Emily Ruth Preddey. For service to sport, journalism and broadcasting.
- Allan Douglas Preece. For service to primary industry.
- The Reverend Michael James Rafter. For service to religion and the ethnic community.
- Nora Barry, Lady Randall. For community service.
- Jean Ethel Rogerson. For service to education and the community.
- Trevor Ernest Rowe. For public service.
- Eric Grant Gordon Rowley. For service to the dairy industry.
- Patrick Reginald William Smith. For public service.
- Robert Latimer Southern. For public service.
- Vera Isabella Summers. For service to nursing and health.
- Walter Albert Thompson. For service to journalism and the community.
- Elizabeth Magdaline Toomey. For service to nursing and health.
- Doctor Colin Hart Wall. For service to dentistry.
- Joan Mary Wright. For service to conservation and the environment.
- John Archibald Lewis Youl. For service to local government and to the community.

=== Companion of the Imperial Service Order (ISO) ===
- Lyall Leslie Gillespie. For public service.
- John Richard Hunter. For public service.
- Gordon William Russell. For public service.
- Kenneth Lawrence Wells. For public service.

=== British Empire Medal (BEM) ===
Military Division

Royal Australian Navy

- Chief Petty Officer Bruce Harvey Goulding (R94801).
- Chief Petty Officer Noel Terence Hughes (R62021).

Australian Army

- Staff Sergeant Lionel George Bowen (29356), Royal Australian Corps of Transport.
- Staff Sergeant William Thomas Drennan (28837), Royal Australian Infantry.
- Staff Sergeant Kevin Shaun Heath (55732), Royal Australian Corps of Signals.
- Corporal Kim Gordon Mahony (2240486), Royal Australian Infantry.
- Sergeant Lionel Ronald Wilson (16962), Royal Australian Army Medical Corps.

Royal Australian Air Force

- Flight Sergeant Desmond Noel Godfrey (A110867).
- Flight Sergeant Michael Ray Hose (A316552).
- Sergeant Bruce Vincent Roberts (A223047).

Civil Division

- Melva Hazel Susie Anderson. For community service.
- Ella Esther Barry. For community service.
- Anna Bauze. For service to the Lithuanian community.
- James Wiltshire Bigg. For public services.
- Mary Jean Burrell. For community service.
- Anthony Leslie James Cawdell. For service to disabled people.
- Francis Maxwell Corby. For community service.
- Feliks Jan Dangel. For service to the community, particularly Polish migrants.
- Ernest Arthur Davis. For service to local government and the community.
- Mary Juliet Dawes. For community service.
- Margaret Mary Jane Dobson. For community service.
- Peter Francis. For service to conservation and the environment.
- Charles Alexander Fuller. For community service.
- Arthur Herbert Elliot Godwin. For service to veterans.
- Clyde William Harvey. For service to veterans and the community.
- Frederick Stanley Hawkins. For community service.
- June Charles Hill. For public service.
- Vernon Walter Hinley. For public service and service to the community.
- Reginald James Hopgood. For service to sport.
- Gordon Albert Hume. For public service and service to youth.
- Mary Concord Hunter. For community service.
- Joyce Johnson. For community service.
- Mary Johnson. For service to youth and the community.
- Guy Maxwell Johnston. For service to veterans.
- Marion Dorothy Johnston. For community service.
- Stanley Owen Keen. For public service.
- Robert Humphrey Maconachie. For community service.
- Raymond Sylvester McInnes. For public service.
- Mary Agnes Markham. For public service and service to the community.
- Cecil Charles Mundy. For public service.
- Vida Ruby Victoria Newman. For community service.
- Jean Bonney Nichols. For community service.
- Stanley Nicol. For community service in fire prevention.
- Miriam Delma Nott. For community service.
- Vernon Henry Osborn. For public service.
- Jessie Louise Potter. For public service.
- Joan Gladys Rawson. For community service in the field of animal welfare.
- Norman Sturdee Read. For service to youth through model railways.
- Norma Ruth Ruskin. For community service.
- Robert James Knox Semple. For service to pipe band music.
- Sydney Shaw. For community service.
- Harold James Sims. For service to the Ambulance Service.
- Myra Jean Southwell. For community service.
- William Henry Stoops. For service to veterans.
- Elisabeth Marian Tait. For community service.
- Alfred Lionel Tidbury. For service to veterans.
- Kenneth Alfred Vinnicombe. For community service.
- Royce Elgar Wham. For public service.
- Laurie Irene Witherdin. For public service.
- John Boleslaw Wolny. For public service.
- Jack James Young. For service to youth.

=== Air Force Cross (AFC) ===
Australian Army

- Captain Leigh Francis Collins, (359230), Australian Army Aviation Corps.

Royal Australian Air Force

- Squadron Leader Peter John Criss (0224939).
- Squadron Leader Richard John Seager (0223545).
- Flight Lieutenant Lindsay Roy Ward (0120589).

=== Queen's Commendation for Valuable Service in the Air ===
Royal Australian Navy

- Lieutenant Kim Eric Baddams (0114003).

Royal Australian Air Force

- Flight Lieutenant Arnis Adam Delvins (048706).
- Sergeant Michael Richard Morris (A225575).
- Flight Lieutenant Hendrick Antonius Maria Van Beuntngen (057953).

== Cook Islands ==
=== Order of the British Empire ===
==== Officer of the Order of the British Empire (OBE) ====
Civil Division

- Vainerere Tangatapoto, MP. For public and community service in the Cook Islands.

==== Member of the Order of the British Empire (MBE) ====
Civil Division

- The Reverend Turakiare Teauariki. For service to the Cook Islands Christian Church.

== The Bahamas ==
=== Order of Saint Michael and Saint George ===
==== Knight Commander of the Order of St Michael and St George (KCMG) ====
- The Right Honourable Lynden Oscar Pindling, MP, Prime Minister.

==== Companion of the Order of St Michael and St George (CMG) ====
- Oris Stanley Russell, OBE, Permanent Secretary, Ministry of External Affairs.

=== Order of the British Empire ===
==== Commander of the Order of the British Empire (CBE) ====
Civil Division

- Gerald Augustus Bartlett, OBE, QPM, CPM, Commissioner of Police.

==== Officer of the Order of the British Empire (OBE) ====
Civil Division

- Bishop Kenneth Dalezine Josey. For services to The Church of God.
- Lottie Vivian Tynes. For services to The Bahamas Red Cross.

==== Member of the Order of the British Empire (MBE) ====
Civil Division

- Joseph Russell Ford. For public service.
- Rolly Bertram Grey. For services to sloop racing and the community.
- Errol Wentworth Leach, Deputy General Manager, Bahamas Telecommunications Corporation.
- Fernley Palmer. For services to youth.
- The Reverend Wilbert Rolle. For services to religion and the community.
- Roderick Simms. For services as President of The Bahamas Paraplegic Association.

== Fiji ==
=== Order of Saint Michael and Saint George ===
==== Knight Grand Cross of the Order of St Michael and St George (GCMG) ====
- The Right Honourable Ratu Sir Kamisese Kapaiwai Tuimacilai Mara, KBE, Prime Minister.

=== Order of the British Empire ===
==== Commander of the Order of the British Empire (CBE) ====
Civil Division

- Filipe Bole, Ambassador to the United Nations and the United States of America.

==== Officer of the Order of the British Empire (OBE) ====
Civil Division

- Ratu Ratavo Ganilau Lalabalavu. For services to provincial government.
- Reginald John Woodman. For services to the community.
- Abdul Hameed Yusuf. For services to the sugar industry.

==== Member of the Order of the British Empire (MBE) ====
Civil Division

- Semi Leiene Ketewai. For services to the community.
- Raj Pati Kewal. For services to the community.
- Ratu Simione Batiratu Matanitobua. For services to education and the community.
- Babu Ram. For services to the community.
- Frank Kellis Underwood. For public and community service.

=== British Empire Medal (BEM) ===
- Subramaniam Maran, Senior Technical Officer, Ministry of Agriculture and Fisheries.
- Ratu Sakiusa Naisau. For services to the community.
- Joeli Luke Sauqaqa. For public and community service.
- Mohammed Shafiq. For public service as driver and messenger.
- Edward Beci Waqairawai, Principal Engineer, Posts and Telecommunications Department.

== Papua New Guinea ==
=== Knight Bachelor ===
- The Honourable Bruce Reginald Jephcott, CBE. For services to politics and the community.
- The Honourable Niwia Ebia Olewale. For services to politics and government.

=== Order of Saint Michael and Saint George ===
==== Companion of the Order of St Michael and St George (CMG) ====
- Galen Lang. For services to provincial and local government.

=== Order of the British Empire ===
==== Commander of the Order of the British Empire (CBE) ====
Civil Division

- Paul Baundi Bernard Bengo. For services to politics and government.
- Suinavi Otio, MP. For services to the community and parliament.

==== Officer of the Order of the British Empire (OBE) ====
Civil Division

- Daniel Joseph Leahy. For services to the development of the Western Highlands.
- Ramon Richard Thurecht. For services to commerce, tourism and government.
- John Tion Tovuia. For services to the community.
- Bernard Vogae. For services to provincial and local government.

==== Member of the Order of the British Empire (MBE) ====
Civil Division

- Reverend Brian James Barnes, Chaplain to the Royal Papua New Guinea Constabulary.
- Immaculata Laen Kereku. For services to the community.
- James Koibo. For public service.
- Tapora Tippi Lokoloko. For services to nursing.
- Salitia Muga. For services to sport.
- Rosemary Munaga. For services to health.
- Correctional Officer David Bore Oiye. For services to the Corrective Institutions Service.
- Veitu Apana Rumery. For services to sport.

=== British Empire Medal (BEM) ===
Civil Division

- Senior Constable Gene Garima. For services to the Royal Papua New Guinea Constabulary.
- Senior Constable Tom Irai. For services to the Royal Papua New Guinea Constabulary.
- Morea Kevau. For public service as a driver.
- Sergeant James Senat. For services to the Royal Papua New Guinea Constabulary.

=== Queen's Police Medal (QPM) ===
- Assistant Commissioner Thomas Samai, Royal Papua New Guinea Constabulary.
- Chief Superintendent Ronald Phillip Symonds, Royal Papua New Guinea Constabulary.

== Solomon Islands ==
=== Order of the British Empire ===
==== Officer of the Order of the British Empire (OBE) ====
Civil Division

- Alick Nonohimae. For service to the community.
- Dr. Haynes Posala. For medical services.

==== Member of the Order of the British Empire (MBE) ====
Civil Division

- Rosemary Honor Clarke. For service to education.
- Samuel Irofufuli. For service to commerce.

=== British Empire Medal (BEM) ===
Civil Division

- Jesiel Chamatete. For service to the community and Province.
- Lionel Giano. For public service.
- John Kabwere. For service to Royal Solomon Islands Police Band.
- Andrew Yapela. For public service.

== Tuvalu ==
=== Order of Saint Michael and Saint George ===
==== Companion of the Order of St Michael and St George (CMG) ====
- Henry Faati Naisali, MBE, Minister of Finance.

== Saint Lucia ==
=== Order of the British Empire ===
==== Commander of the Order of the British Empire (CBE) ====
Civil Division

- The Right Honourable Allan Fitzgerald Laurent Louisy. For services to politics and the law.

==== Officer of the Order of the British Empire (OBE) ====
Civil Division

- Augustus Benjamin Compton. For public service.

==== Member of the Order of the British Empire (MBE) ====
Civil Division

- Darius Charlemagne. For public and community service.
- Ives Heraldine Rock. For political and community service.
- Jessie Marguerite Florida Stephens, Secretary of the Saint Lucia Association in the United Kingdom.

=== British Empire Medal (BEM) ===
Civil Division

- Lennox George Boniface DuBoulay. For service to the Scout movement.
- Flora Véronique Girard. For service to the community.
- Catharina Francois Joseph. For service to teaching and to Guiding.
- Carnite Marie Leo. For service to nursing and the community.

== Saint Vincent and the Grenadines ==
=== Order of the British Empire ===
==== Officer of the Order of the British Empire (OBE) ====
Civil Division

- Arthur Cecil Cyrus. For service to health and the community.

==== Member of the Order of the British Empire (MBE) ====
Civil Division

- Beryl Adella Baptiste. For public and community service.
- Alphaeus Sylvester King. For public and community service.

== Antigua and Barbuda ==
=== Order of Saint Michael and Saint George ===
==== Companion of the Order of St Michael and St George (CMG) ====
- Edmund Hawkins Lake, Ambassador to United States of America.

=== Order of the British Empire ===
==== Officer of the Order of the British Empire (OBE) ====
Military Division

- Major Dennis Charles Raymond Gardiner, MBE, ED, Commandant, Antigua and Barbuda Defence Force.
