= Archie Birtwistle =

British general

Major-General Archibald Cull Birtwistle CB CBE DL (19 August 1927 – 18 March 2009) was a British military signals officer.

Born in Northwich, Cheshire, Birtwistle was educated at Sir John Deane's College (then SJD's Grammar School).

Birtwistle completed his officer training at the Mons Officer Cadet School in Aldershot, and upon receiving his commission was posted to 1 Training Regiment and subsequently to 1 Commonwealth Division Signal Regiment. He was mentioned in dispatches for his service in the Korean War.

Promoted to major general in 1979, he was appointed Chief Signal Officer BAOR, and a year later Signal Officer-in-Chief (Army). He was awarded a CB in the 1983 New Year Honours, and retired from active service a year later.

Birtwistle married Sylvia Elleray, with whom he had two sons and a daughter. She died in 2021.
