= George Mackley =

English wood engraving artist (1900–1983)

George Edward Mackley MBE (born 1900 in Huntingdon, died 1983 in Tonbridge, Kent) was an English wood engraving artist.

== Career ==
Educated at the Judd School in Tonbridge, Kent, Mackley trained as a teacher of art at Goldsmiths' College, London, specializing in painting and etching. In 1935, he learned basic wood engraving technique from Noel Rooke.

Mackley's book Wood Engraving, published in 1948, remains one of the leading manuals of engraving techniques. In A History of British Wood Engraving (1978) Albert Garrett described him as ‘a phenomenon in British engraving. A few square centimetres of Mackley is more charged with aesthetic energy, emotion and precision than many artists can muster in a lifetime [...] He could not tolerate bad or weak craftsmanship under any circumstances; bad draughtsmanship met with short shrift from him. He makes no claims to being a creative artist and always stresses that he is primarily a craftsman.'

He was made a Member of the Order of the British Empire in the 1983 New Year Honours.

== Publications ==
- George Mackley's Picture Book, George Mackley, 1981, J.L. Carr, Publisher, Kettering England.
- Wood Engraving, George Mackley, Gresham Books. ISBN 978-0-905418-84-1
- Confessions of a Woodpecker, George Mackley & H. Ecclestone, 1981, ISBN 978-0-905418-92-6
- George Mackley, Wood Engravings, 1995, Blond Fine Art. ASIN B001NFK4AU
- Monica Poole: Wood engraver, George Mackley & Graham L. Williams, 1984, Florin. ISBN 978-0-90671-510-9
- Wood Engravings with illustrations, George Mackley. ASIN B0014LW1T2
