= Kevin Bourke =

Australia international rugby union player

- Full name: Thomas Kevin Bourke
- Born: 23 January 1922 Kingaroy, QLD, Australia
- Died: 27 May 2014 (aged 92)

Rugby union career
- Position: Centre
International career
Years	Team	Apps	(Points)
1947	Australia	1	(0)

Thomas Kevin Bourke OBE (23 January 1922 — 27 May 2014) was an Australian rugby union international.

Born in Kingaroy, Queensland, Bourke received his education at Downlands College in Toowoomba. After serving as a RAAF officer in World War II, he won a first-grade premiership with Brisbane club Brothers in 1946.

Bourke gained his only Wallabies cap as an inside centre against the All Blacks at the Sydney Cricket Ground in 1947. He broke his collarbone in the closing stages of the match and had to be carried off the field. Although under an injury cloud, Bourke was selected for the 1947–48 tour of Britain, Ireland, France, missing some of the early tour matches while still recovering from the collarbone break. He finished the tour with 16 uncapped appearances.

An engineering executive, Bourke was employed by the ABC and in the 1983 New Year Honours was made an Officer of the Order of the British Empire (OBE) for service to broadcast engineering.

== See also ==
- List of Australia national rugby union players
