= Joint Consultants' Committee =

The Joint Consultants' Committee, properly the Joint Medical Consultative Council, is a negotiating committee for NHS hospital doctors in the United Kingdom established in 1948. It represents the medical profession in discussions with the government on matters relating to the maintenance of standards of professional knowledge and skill in the hospital service and the encouragement of education and research.

It is composed of 18 members representing the Academy of Medical Royal Colleges, 17 representing the British Medical Association, 2 representing the British Dental Association, 2 representing the Conference of Postgraduate Medical Deans and 1 representing the Medical Schools Council. The Chairman and the representatives of the Welsh and Northern Irish Sub-committees are Non-Aligned Members.

The composition has changed over time. In 1969 there were only 24 members in total. Since 1975 it no longer negotiates remuneration or terms and conditions for staff employment, but discusses professional issues such as revalidation.
