= Adrian Shepherd =

British cellist and conductor

Adrian Shepherd, MBE (7 April 1939 – 24 July 2013) was a British 'cellist and conductor, and director of the modern-instrument ensemble Cantilena.

Shepherd was born in 1939 in the county of Essex, England, and studied the cello with William Pleeth at the Guildhall School of Music and Drama, For 20 years he was principal cello with the Royal Scottish National Orchestra and professor of cello at the Royal Scottish Academy of Music and Drama. Shepherd founded the modern instrument ensemble Cantilena in 1970 and remained its artistic director and conductor. He was also a director of the Cantilena Festival on Islay each July.
