= Michael Tillotson =

British soldier and military historian (1928 – 2023)

Major-General Henry Michael Tillotson CB CBE (1928–2023) was a British Army officer and a well-regarded military historian. He was also involved in optometry in Europe, serving as secretary-general of the Association of Contact Lens Manufacturers and the first secretary-general of the European Federation of Contact Lens Manufacturers.

== See also ==
- Croix de Guerre
- Prince of Wales's Own Regiment of Yorkshire
