= Heraldine Rock =

Saint Lucian educator and politician

Ives Heraldine Rock GBE
- Born: Ives Heraldine Gajadhar; 28 July 1933; Forestierre, Castries, Saint Lucia
- Died: 31 August 2012 (aged 79)
- Other names: Ma Rock
- Spouse: Edward Rock m.1956

Ives Heraldine "Ma" Rock (née Gajadhar) (28 July 1933 – 31 August 2012) was a Saint Lucian educator and politician. She was the first woman to be elected to Parliament and serve as a Minister of Cabinet in Saint Lucia.

She worked as public relations officer of the St. Lucia Banana Growers Association but resigned in 1964 to enter politics. She was elected first vice-president of the United Workers Party. In the parliamentary elections of June 1964 she was the losing candidate for South Castries. Later that year she gained a seat on the Castries Town Board. She became the first woman to hold political office in Saint Lucia when she beat George Odlum to win the parliamentary seat of Castries South East in 1974.

She then became the first woman to serve as a government minister as Minister of Housing, Community Development, Local Government and Social Affairs from 1974 to 1980.

She decided not to contest the general elections in 1982, but when the United Workers Party won the 1982 elections was appointed to serve as a senator on the government side until 1987. She later served on various private and public boards including Board of Directors of the St. Lucia Electricity Services and the Development Control Authority. Rock served as a Justice of the Peace (Juge de Paix) from 1965 and was invested as a Member of the Order of the British Empire (MBE).
