= 1988 Birthday Honours =

British government recognitions

Queen's Birthday Honours are announced on or around the date of the Queen's Official Birthday in Australia, Canada, New Zealand and the United Kingdom. The dates vary, both from year to year and from country to country. All are published in supplements to the London Gazette and many are conferred by the monarch (or her representative) some time after the date of the announcement, particularly for those service people on active duty.

The 1988 Queen's Birthday honours lists were announced on 11 June 1988.

Recipients of honours are shown below as they were styled before their new honour.

== United Kingdom ==
=== Life Peers ===
==== Barons ====
- Robert Scott Alexander, Q.C., Judge of the Courts of Appeal of Jersey and Guernsey. Chairman, Panel on Takeovers and Mergers.
- Professor Sir (William) John (Hughes) Butterfield, O.B.E., former Regius Professor of Physic, University of Cambridge.
- The Honourable Lord Alexander John Mackenzie Stuart, President, Court of Justice, European Communities, Luxembourg.
- Sir William Rees-Mogg, Chairman, The Arts Council of Great Britain.

=== Privy Counsellors ===
- John Ambrose Cope, M.P., Member of Parliament, Northavon. Minister of State, Department of Employment.
- The Honourable Peter Hugh Morrison, M.P., Member of Parliament, City of Chester. Minister of State, Department of Energy.

=== Knights Bachelor ===
- Christopher John Elinger Ball, Chairman, National Advisory Body for Public Sector Higher Education.
- Anthony Richard Barrowclough, Q.C., Parliamentary Commissioner for Administration and Health Service Commissioner for England, Wales and Scotland.
- Harrison (Harry) Birtwistle, Composer.
- John Derek Richardson Bradbeer, O.B.E., T.D., President, The Law Society.
- Colin Michael Chandler, Head of Defence Export Services, Ministry of Defence.
- Alcon Charles Copisarow. For public services.
- John Muir Drinkwater, Q.C. For political and public service.
- Nicholas Hardwick Fairbairn, Q.C., M.P. For political service.
- Antony George Anson Fisher, A.F.C. For political and public service.
- William Gerald Golding, C.B.E., Author.
- Graham John Hills, Principal and Vice-Chancellor, University of Strathclyde.
- Peter Fenwick Holmes, M.C., Chairman, Shell Transport and Trading company plc.
- Peter Michael Imbert, Q.P.M., Commissioner, Metropolitan Police.
- Aaron Klug. For services to Molecular Biology.
- John (Jack) Layden, Chairman, Association of Metropolitan Authorities.
- Lee Quo-wei, C.B.E., J.P. For public and community services in Hong Kong.
- Robert Michael Conal McNair-Wilson, M.P. For political service.
- Hilary Duppa (Hal) Miller, M.P. For political service.
- Peter North Miller, lately Chairman, Lloyds.
- John Godolphin Quicke, C.B.E., D.L. For public service and services to Agriculture.
- Edward Rayne, C.V.O. Chairman, British Fashion Council.
- Charles Hugh Reece. For services to Science and Technology.
- William Vernon Stephen Seccombe, Chairman, South Western Regional Health Authority.
- Cyril Smith, M.B.E., M.P. For political and public service.
- Kerry St Johnston, lately President, General Council of British Shipping.
- Reo Argiros Stakis, Chairman, The Reo Stakis Organisation.
- John Heydon Romaine Stokes, M.P. For political service.
- William George MacKenzie Sutherland, Q.P.M., Chief Constable, Lothian and Borders Police.
- Keith Vivian Thomas, President, Corpus Christi College, Oxford. For services to the Study of History.
- Alexander Cuthbert Turnbull, C.B.E., Nuffield Professor of Obstetrics and Gynaecology, University of Oxford.
- Alfred Joseph Vasquez, C.B.E., Q.C. For public services in Gibraltar.
- Norman Edward Wakefield, Chairman and Chief Executive, Y J Lovell (Holdings) plc.
- Dennis Murray Walters, M.B.E., M.P. For political service.
- Neil Gowanloch Westbrook, C.B.E. For political and public service.
- Philip William Wilkinson, Deputy Chairman, National Westminster Bank.

=== Order of the Bath ===
==== Knight Grand Cross of the Order of the Bath (GCB) ====
Military Division

- General Sir John Chapple, K.C.B., C.B.E., A.D.C. Gen., Colonel 2nd King Edward VII's Own Gurkha Rifles (The Sirmoor Rifles).

Civil Division

- Sir Clive Anthony Whitmore, K.C.B., C.V.O., Permanent Under Secretary of State, Home Office.

==== Knight Commander of the Order of the Bath (KCB) ====
Military Division

- Vice Admiral John Cunningham Kirkwood Slater, L.V.O.
- Lieutenant General John Richard Alexander MacMillan, C.B.E., late The Gordon Highlanders, Colonel Commandant The Scottish Division.
- Lieutenant General Charles John Waters, C.B.E., Colonel The Gloucestershire Regiment.
- Air Marshal Kenneth William Hayr, C.B., C.B.E., A.F.C.*, Royal Air Force.

Civil Division

- Peter Lewis Gregson, C.B., Permanent Under Secretary of State, Department of Energy.
- Richard Anthony Lloyd Jones, C.B., Permanent Secretary, Welsh Office.

==== Companion of the Order of the Bath (CB) ====
Military Division

Royal Navy

- Rear Admiral Roger Charles Dimmock.
- Surgeon Rear Admiral Trevor Richard Walker Hampton, Q.H.P.

Army

- Major General Bryan Morris Bowen, late Royal Army Pay Corps.
- Major General Patrick Guy Brooking, M.B.E., late 5th Royal Inniskilling Dragoon Guards.
- Major General David Bryan Hall Colley, C.B.E., Colonel Commandant Royal Corps of Transport.
- Major General Charles Gordon Cornock, M.B.E., Colonel Commandant Royal Regiment of Artillery.
- Major General Anthony John Shaw, C.B.E., Q.H.P., late Royal Army Medical Corps.
- Major General Colin Terry Shortis, C.B.E, Colonel Commandant The Prince of Wales' Division, Colonel The Devonshire and Dorset Regiment.
- Major General Stephen Robert Anthony Stopford, M.B.E., late The Royal Scots Dragoon Guards (Carabiniers and Greys).

Royal Air Force

- Air Vice-Marshal Richard Anthony Mason, C.B.E., Royal Air Force.
- Air Vice-Marshal Michael George Simmons, A.F.C., Royal Air Force.
- Air Vice-Marshal David Whittaker, M.B.E., Royal Air Force.

Civil Division

- Professor Ronald Leslie Bell, Director-General, Agricultural Development and Advisory Service; Chief Scientific Adviser, Ministry of Agriculture, Fisheries and Food.
- William Joseph Bohan, Assistant Under Secretary of State, Home Office.
- (John) Michael Bridgeman, Chief Registrar of Friendly Societies and Industrial Assurance Commissioner.
- John St Leger Brockman, Solicitor to the Department of Health and Social Security, and Registrar General to the Office of Population Censuses and Surveys.
- Harold Granville Terence Payne Doyne-Ditmas, Under Secretary, Minister of Defence.
- William Hugh Jack, Permanent Secretary, Department of Agriculture, Northern Ireland.
- Iain Smith Macdonald, Chief Medical Officer, Scottish Home and Health Department.
- James Alexander Mackintosh MacKenzie, lately Chief Road Engineer, Scottish Development Department.
- James Stephen Mason, Parliamentary Counsel, Office of the Parliamentary Counsel.
- Nicholas Jeremy Monck, Deputy Secretary, H.M. Treasury.
- Robin Mountfield, Deputy Secretary, Department of Trade and Industry.
- John Tregarthen Murley, Foreign and Commonwealth Office.
- Bernard Pollard, lately Deputy Secretary and Director General (Technical), Board of Inland Revenue.
- Peter Graham Smith, Under Secretary, Ministry of Defence.

=== Order of St Michael and St George ===
==== Knight Grand Cross of the Order of St Michael and St George (GCMG) ====
- The Right Honourable Peter Alexander Rupert, Baron Carrington, K.G., C.H., K.C.M.G., M.C., Secretary-General, North Atlantic Treaty Organisation, Brussels.

==== Knight Commander of the Order of St Michael and St George (KCMG) ====
- Rodric Quentin Braithwaite, C.M.G., Foreign and Commonwealth Office.
- Alan Ewen Donald, C.M.G., H.M. Ambassador, Peking.
- John Rodney Johnson, C.M.G., British High Commissioner, Nairobi.
- James Mellon, C.M.G., H.M. Consul-General and Director-General of Trade and Investment, New York.

==== Companion of the Order of St Michael and St George (CMG) ====
- Adrian John Beamish, H.M. Ambassador, Lima.
- John Kenneth Elliott Broadley, H.M. Ambassador, Holy See.
- Juliet Jeanne d'Auvergne Mrs Campbell, H.M. Ambassador, Luxembourg.
- Ronald Frank Robert Deare, Grade 5, Overseas Development Administration.
- Mark Elliott, H.M. Ambassador, Tel Aviv.
- John Donald Garner, L.V.O., H.M. Consul-General, Houston.
- Michael John Carlisle Glaze, H.M. Ambassador, Luanda.
- Paul Emil Heim, lately Registrar, European Court of Justice, Luxembourg.
- Roger William Horrell, O.B.E., Foreign and Commonwealth Office.
- Alexander David Knox, lately Vice-President, IBRD, New York.
- Anthony David Loehnis, Executive Director, The Bank of England.
- Christopher John Rome Meyer, Foreign and Commonwealth Office.
- David Purvis Small, M.B.E., British High Commissioner, Georgetown.
- Veronica Evelyn Mrs Sutherland, H.M. Ambassador, Abidjan.

=== Royal Victorian Order ===
==== Knight Grand Cross of the Royal Victorian Order (GCVO) ====
- The Right Honourable Sir William Frederick Payne Heseltine, K.C.B., K.C.V.O., A.C.

==== Knight Commander of the Royal Victorian Order (KCVO) ====
- Colonel Robert Andrew St George Martin, O.B.E.
- Lieutenant-Colonel William Bertram Swan, C.B.E., T.D.

==== Commander of the Royal Victorian Order (CVO) ====
- Eric Hopwood, O.B.E.
- Michael Maclagan.
- Brian Henry McGrath.
- William Richard Michael Oswald, L.V.O.
- Colonel Alan Brooke Pemberton, M.B.E.
- Derek Roy Waters, L.V.O.

==== Lieutenant of the Royal Victorian Order (LVO) ====
- The Honourable Elizabeth Shan Josephine, Mrs Legge-Bourke.
- David Hubert Boothby Chesshyre.
- John Cregg Fennell.
- Jean, Mrs Maitland, M.V.O.
- Anthony Stuart Poole.
- Group Captain Joseph Leon Gabriel Taschereau, C.D., D.F.C., R.C.A.F. (Retd.)
- Commander Christopher Robin Tuffley, Royal Navy.

==== Member of the Royal Victorian Order (MVO) ====
- Miss Sheena Mary Fergus.
- Inspector Brian Cecil Howes, Metropolitan Police.
- Major Leslie Bertie Fitzroy Marsham.
- Captain Roger McClosky.
- Donna, Mrs Mowbray.
- Warrant Officer (Seaman) Ellis Victor Norrell, R.V.M., Royal Navy.
- Superintendent Harold Parkinson, Norfolk Constabulary.
- Frederick George Waite, R.V.M.
- Sarah, Mrs Warburton.

=== Royal Victorian Medal (RVM) ===
==== Royal Victorian Medal (Silver) ====
- Christopher Frederick Biggs.
- Divisional Sergeant-Major William Edward Brammer.
- Corporal of Horse Edward George Reginald Charlett, Life Guards.
- Percival Cottrell.
- Band Colour Sergeant Richard Cameron James Granger, Royal Marines.
- Graham John Harrod.
- Roy Thomas William Howling.
- Lance Sergeant Ronald John Lewis, Welsh Guards.
- Trevor Mace.
- Corporal of Horse Douglas Clifford Frederick Preece, Blues and Royals.
- James Rutt.
- Chief Technician Peter Clive Soar, Royal Air Force.
- Chief Technician David Turnock, Royal Air Force.

=== Order of the British Empire ===
==== Knight Grand Cross of the Order of the British Empire (GBE) ====
- Sir Kenneth Berrill, K.C.B., lately Chairman, Securities and Investments Board.

==== Dame Commander of the Order of the British Empire (DBE) ====
- Miss Beryl Elizabeth Grey, C.B.E. (Mrs Svenson). For services to the London Festival Ballet and the Royal Academy of Dancing.
- Miss Rosalinde Hurley (Mrs Gortvai), Chairman, The Medicines Commission; Professor of Microbiology, University of London.

==== Knight Commander of the Order of the British Empire (KBE) ====
- Surgeon Vice Admiral Godfrey James Milton-Thompson, Q.H.P.
- Sir (John) Robin Ibbs, Director, Lloyds Bank plc; Adviser to the Prime Minister on Efficiency and Effectiveness in Government.
- Derek Maxwell March, C.B.E., British High Commissioner, Kampala.

==== Commander of the Order of the British Empire (CBE) ====
Military Division

- Captain Peter John Erskine, A.D.C., Royal Navy.
- Captain Neil Erskine Rankin, Royal Navy.
- Captain Michael Edward Southgate, Royal Navy.
- Colonel David Leslie Burden, late Royal Army Ordnance Corps.
- Brigadier Raphael Christopher Joseph Dick, late Royal Tank Regiment.
- Brigadier Peter Royson Duffell, O.B.E., M.C., late 2nd King Edward VII's Own Gurkha Rifles (The Sirmoor Rifles).
- Brigadier Michael Arthur Gardner, late Corps of Royal Electrical and Mechanical Engineers.
- Colonel Harold Edward Dunstan Griffiths, T.D., late Royal Army Medical Corps, Territorial Army.
- Brigadier Mary Brigid Teresa Hennessy, M.B.E., R.R.C., Q.H.N.S., Queen Alexandra's Royal Army Nursing Corps.
- Brigadier Robert George Long, O.B.E., M.C., Colonel The Royal Hampshire Regiment.
- Colonel David John Ralls, O.B.E., D.F.C., late Army Air Corps.
- Brigadier Michael John Wilkes, O.B.E., late Royal Regiment of Artillery.
- Air Commodore William Henry Croydon, O.B.E., Royal Air Force.
- Group Captain David Francis Layton Edwards, Royal Air Force.
- Air Commodore Ian Ross Lindsay, Royal Air Force.
- Air Commodore Robert Lawrence Reid, O.B.E., Royal Air Force (Retd.)

Civil Division

- Miss Aileen Kirkpatrick Adams, Dean, Faculty of Anaesthetists, Royal College of Surgeons.
- Peter Dobson Allen, Managing Director, Operations, Strip Products Group, British Steel Corporation.
- Brian Cecil Arthur, Chief Inspector, H.M. Inspectorate of Schools, Department of Education and Science.
- John Charles Bass, Director of Research, The Plessey Company plc.
- Edward John Bavister, Chairman, John Brown Engineers and Constructors Limited.
- Professor John Kenneth Anthony Bleasdale, lately Director, Institute of Horticultural Research, Agricultural and Food Research Council.
- Dennis Gait Boyd, Chief Conciliation Officer, Advisory, Conciliation and Arbitration Service.
- Michael Dennis Bryant, Actor.
- John David Keith Burton, H.M. Coroner, Western District, Greater London; Secretary, Coroners Society of England and Wales.
- Patrick Alfred Caldwell-Moore, O.B.E. For services to Astronomy.
- John Cyril Chaplin, Group Director, Safety Regulation Group, Civil Aviation Authority.
- Francis Ian Chapman, Chairman and Chief Executive, William Collins plc.
- Barton James Clarke, Chairman and Managing Director, Racal Radar Defence Systems. For services to Export.
- Samuel Laurence Harrison Clarke. For services to Collaborative Research in Information Technology.
- Timothy Francis Clement-Jones. For political service.
- Geoffrey John Cleverdon. For political and public service.
- John Ernest Clout, Leader, North Yorkshire County Council.
- Herbert Evan Cornish, Chairman, Linpac Group Limited.
- Elizabeth Crawford Gallagher, Mrs Craghill, lately Assistant Secretary, Scottish Development Department.
- Edward Brandwood Cunningham, Director, Planning and Projects, Scottish Development Agency.
- James Gresham Davis, Chairman, International Maritime Industries Forum.
- Hugh Arnold Freeman Dudley, Professor of Surgery, St Mary's Hospital.
- Brian Edwards, Regional General Manager, Trent Regional Health Authority.
- Noreen Louisa, Mrs Edwards, O.B.E., T.D., D.L., Chairman, Gwynedd Health Authority.
- Frederick Ernest Elliott. For services to the National Farmers' Union.
- Donald Forster, lately Chairman, Merseyside Development Corporation.
- Wallace Stewart Foulds, Tennent Professor of Ophthalmology, University of Glasgow.
- John Gadd, lately Regional Chairman, North Thames, British Gas plc.
- Nicol Spence Galbraith, Director, Communicable Disease Surveillance Centre, Public Health Laboratory Service.
- Derek Stanley Gordon, O.B.E., Consultant Neuro-Surgeon, Royal Victoria Hospital, Belfast.
- Ian David Grant, President National Farmers' Union of Scotland.
- Professor Edward Thomas Hall. For scientific services to Archaeology.
- Dennis John Hatfield, Chief Education Officer, Trafford.
- Gordon Drummond John Hay, Chairman, Stoddard Holdings plc.
- Robert Colquhoun Hay, President, Industrial Tribunals, Scotland.
- William Ross Henderson, T.D. For political service.
- Stanley Thomas Keck Hester, lately Director of Audit, Ministry of Agriculture, Fisheries and Food.
- Werner Wolfgang Heubeck, O.B.E., Managing Director, Ulsterbus Limited and Citybus Limited.
- Colonel William Peter Howells, O.B.E., T.D., D.L., Chairman, Wales Territorial Auxiliary and Volunteer Association.
- Pamela May, Mrs Hudson-Bendersky, Regional Nursing Director, North West Thames Regional Health Authority.
- Thomas Hunter, Convenor, Borders Regional Council.
- Francis Brian Appleton Irving. For political and public service.
- Professor Robert Barr Jack. For services to the Legal Profession in Scotland.
- Professor Anthony Kelly. For services to Science and Engineering; Vice Chancellor, University of Surrey.
- Patrick Gerard Joseph Kinder, General Manager, Eastern Health and Social Services Board.
- Frederick John Kingdom, Deputy Leader, West Glamorgan County Council.
- Gavin Harry Laird, General Secretary, Amalgamated Engineering Union.
- Philip Michael Lee, Grade 4, Department of Transport.
- His Honour Arthur Christian Luft, lately First Deemster and Clerk of the Rolls and Deputy Governor, Isle of Man.
- Katharine Elizabeth, Mrs Lumsden, D.L. For political and public service.
- John Alexander Rose MacPhail, O.B.E., Chairman, The Scotch Whisky Association.
- Norman Alastair Duncan Macrae, Deputy Editor, The Economist.
- Peter Mason, Foreign and Commonwealth Office.
- Miss (Margaret) Valerie Masterson (Mrs March), Opera and concert Singer.
- Keith Desmond McDowall, lately Deputy Director-General, Confederation of British Industry.
- George Roy Colquhoun McDowell, Chairman of the Board, The British Standards Institution.
- Kenneth Allan Glen Miller, Director General, The Engineering Council.
- Commander Denis Woolnough Mills, R.N. (Retd.), O.B.E., D.S.C. For political and public service.
- Kenneth Moses, Technical Director, British Coal Corporation.
- David Fairlie Myles. For political and public service.
- Charles Allen Oakley. For public service in the West of Scotland.
- Gareth Owen, Principal, University College of Wales, Aberystwyth.
- Henry Richard Owen, M.B.E., Grade 5, Department of Trade and Industry.
- John William Penycate, Chairman Yvonne Arnaud Theatre.
- Michael John Price. For political and public service.
- John Charles Ramsden. For political and public service.
- Alfred Graham Raper, lately Chief Executive and Deputy Chairman, Davy Corporation plc.
- John David Rendle, lately Managing Director, Shell Tankers (UK) Limited.
- John David Benbow Richardson, M.C., President, Northern Rent Assessment Panel.
- Eric Frederick Rogers, Deputy Chairman, Occupational Pensions Board.
- James Cecil Cumine Russell, M.B.E. For political and public service.
- Colin Sampson, Q.P.M., Chief Constable, West Yorkshire Police.
- Charles Robert Scaife, National Chairman, The Royal British Legion.
- Professor John Parsons Shillingford, Medical Director, British Heart Foundation.
- Keith Alexander Skinner, Senior Principal Inspector of Taxes, Board of Inland Revenue.
- William Leggat Smith, M.C., T.D., D.L. For public service in Glasgow.
- William Lawrence South, Technical Director, Philips Electronic and Associated Industries Limited.
- Professor Colin Raymond William Spedding, Director, Centre for Agricultural Strategy, Reading University.
- Colin Stansfield Smith, County Architect, Hampshire County Council.
- Frederick Alistair Stone, lately Clerk and Chief Executive Surrey County Council.
- Michael Anthony Stothers, Chairman, William Steward Group.
- William Henry Strawson, D.L., Chairman, Institute of Plant Science Research.
- Norman Frederick Sussman, O.B.E., Joint Managing Director, L. S. and J. Sussman Limited.
- Arthur Cecil Taylor, Chairman, Newcastle Health Authority.
- Miss Wendy Ann Taylor, Sculptor.
- John Harry Tee, Assistant Secretary, Board of Customs and Excise.
- William James Uttley-Moore, Chairman and Managing Director, Computing Devices plc.
- Arthur Burton Weller, Chairman, Britain-Australia Bicentennial Schooner Trust.
- Reginald Alfred, Baron Wells-Pestell. For Services to Parliamentary Committees.
- Allan Wicks, Organist and Director of Music, Canterbury Cathedral.
- John Meredith Williams, Chairman, Welsh Development Agency.
- Dennis James Willmott, Q.F.S.M., lately Chief Fire Officer, Merseyside Fire Brigade.
- Reginald George Woodman, Grade 4, Ministry of Defence.
- Group Captain John Basil Wray, R.A.F., (Retd.) D.F.C. For political service.
- John Micklethwait Wray, Assistant Secretary, Department of Health and Social Security.
- Peter Wright, O.B.E., Chief Constable, South Yorkshire Police.
- Harold Royrie Mansfield Brock, Financial Secretary, Bermuda.
- Alan John Carter, I.S.O., J.P., Director of Immigration, Hong Kong.
- Anthony William Thomas Hudson. For services to British commercial interests in the Far East.
- Alec Ibbott, British High Commissioner, Banjul.
- William Purves, D.S.O., J.P. For public and community services in Hong Kong.
- Harold Theodore Rowlands, O.B.E., Financial Secretary, Falkland Islands.
- Miss Maria Tam Wai-chu, O.B.E., J.P. For public services in Hong Kong.

==== Officer of the Order of the British Empire (OBE) ====
Military Division

Royal Navy

- Commander Edgar Walter Andrew, Royal Navy.
- Commander Andrew Nigel Baird, Royal Navy.
- Commander Joseph Louis Ballantine, R.D., Royal Naval Reserve.
- Commander Christopher James Clay, Royal Navy.
- Lieutenant Colonel Timothy Kendall Courtenay, Royal Marines.
- Commander Anthony John Talbot Eddison, Royal Navy.
- Major (Local Lieutenant Colonel) Malcolm Loudoun Adair Macleod, Royal Marines.
- Commander Geoffrey George Meekums, Royal Navy.
- Reverend Father John Joseph O'Farrell, R.D., Royal Naval Reserve.
- Commander Martin Herbert Rhodes, Royal Navy.
- Commander Michael Dewell Sizeland, Royal Navy.

Army

- Lieutenant Colonel James Graham Aldous, The Royal Regiment of Fusiliers.
- Lieutenant Colonel David Arnold Kellett Biggart, M.B.E., The Royal Regiment of Fusiliers.
- Lieutenant Colonel (Quartermaster) Robert Cecil Edger, M.B.E., The Royal Regiment of Wales (24th/41st Foot).
- Lieutenant Colonel Christopher David Gale, T.D., Royal Corps of Signals, Territorial Army.
- Lieutenant Colonel (Electrical Mechanical Assistant Engineer) Ian Alexander Garrow, Corps of Royal Electrical and Mechanical Engineers.
- Lieutenant Colonel Anthony Edward Hemesley, The Queen's Lancashire Regiment.
- Lieutenant Colonel Richard John Heywood, M.B.E., Coldstream Guards.
- Lieutenant Colonel Edward Richard Holmes, T.D., Wessex Regiment, Territorial Army.
- Lieutenant Colonel William Barry Hughes-Jones, Corps of Royal Military Police.
- Lieutenant Colonel Anthony William Kingaby, Royal Regiment of Artillery.
- Lieutenant Colonel Robert Michael McGhie, The Queen's Regiment.
- Lieutenant Colonel Peter John Russell-Jones, Corps of Royal Engineers.
- Lieutenant Colonel Eric Henry Sambell, Royal Corps of Signals.
- Acting Colonel Michael Joseph Forster Sheffield, T.D., D.L., Army Cadet Force, Territorial Army.
- Acting Colonel Kenneth Richard Smith, Army Cadet Force, Territorial Army.
- Lieutenant Colonel John Michael Thorn, The Duke of Wellington's Regiment (West Riding).
- The Reverend Christopher Charles Tomlinson, Chaplain to the Forces 2nd Class, Royal Army Chaplains' Department.
- Lieutenant Colonel George Dennis Sommerville Truell, M.B.E., Royal Regiment of Artillery.

Royal Air Force

- Wing Commander David Christopher Brown, Royal Air Force.
- Wing Commander Leslie Hakin, Royal Air Force.
- Wing Commander Ian Rowland Hill, Royal Air Force.
- Wing Commander Timothy John Johns, Royal Air Force Volunteer Reserve (Training).
- Wing Commander Graham Fearon McMellin, Royal Air Force.
- Wing Commander Ronald George Nailer, Royal Air Force.
- Wing Commander Leslie Winston Poynter, Royal Air Force.
- Wing Commander Anthony Francis Short, Royal Air Force.
- Wing Commander Trevor George Sidebottom, Royal Air Force.
- Wing Commander Graeme Campbell Smith, A.F.C., Royal Air Force.
- Wing Commander Neil Alexander Innes-Smith, Royal Air Force.

Civil Division

- Eric Martin Abbott, Grade 6, Ministry of Agriculture, Fisheries and Food.
- Anne Maureen, Mrs Acland, Chairman of Council, Queen's Nursing Institute.
- Eric Edward Alley. For services to Civil Defence.
- Kenneth Michael Baker, Managing Director, Durr Limited.
- Thomas Anthony Ball, lately Senior Catering Adviser, Department of Education and Science.
- Anthony Kenneth Barbour. For services to Environmental Science.
- Andrew Barr, Member, South of Scotland Electricity Board.
- Miss Joyce Anne Beak, Chief Nursing Officer, Tunbridge Wells Health Authority.
- Dennis Henry Caleb Bennett, Head Teacher, Cyfarthfa Comprehensive School, Merthyr Tydfil, Mid Glamorgan.
- Alan Winstan Bond, Deputy Director, London Chamber of Commerce.
- Professor Thomas Geoffrey Booth, lately President, Pharmaceutical Society of Great Britain.
- Professor Richard John Brook, lately Head of Department of Ceramics, University of Leeds.
- Charles Harry Brooks, Director, Hawker Siddeley International Ltd. For services to Export.
- Professor Raymond Victor Brooks. For services to research into drug usage in Sport.
- Greta Mary, Mrs Brown. For political and public service.
- Lionel Neville Brown, Professor of Comparative Law, University of Birmingham; Member, Council on Tribunals.
- Miss Marian Phyllis Bull, Chief Administrative Nursing Officer, Mid Glamorgan Health Authority.
- Anthony Winston Burton, Director, The Planning Exchange.
- Sister Hannah Callaghan (Sister Mary Perpetua), Sister Superior, St Anthony's Hospital, Sutton, Surrey.
- John Alexander Calvert. For political and public service.
- Romayne Winifred, Mrs Carswell, Deputy Chairman, Independent Commission for Police Complaints for Northern Ireland.
- Kenneth James Herbert Carter, Principal, Ministry of Defence.
- Jack Morgan Chapman, Principal, West Kent College of Further Education, Tonbridge, Kent.
- Miss Claire Helen Chovil, Head of School Broadcasting (Radio), British Broadcasting Corporation.
- William John Christie. For services to Farming and Conservation.
- Captain Peter Cobb, R.N. (Retd.), Secretary, United Kingdom Branch, Commonwealth Parliamentary Association.
- Miss Audrey Towl Collins, President, Women's Cricket Association.
- Peter James Conchie, Director, Business Development, Space and Communications Division, British Aerospace plc.
- Miss Anne Valerie Cowie (Mrs Harvey), Director, Labour Relations and Legal Department, Royal College of Nursing.
- Anthony Bernard Coyle, leader of the council, Wigan Metropolitan Borough Council.
- John Burton Crowther, Principal, John Crowther and Associates.
- Raymond Charles Curry, T.D. For political and public service.
- John David Scott Curtis, Chairman, Standing Conference on Crime Prevention, Home Office.
- Barrie Randel Darewski, Secretary, Osteopathic Educational Foundation.
- Gerald Hill David, Chairman and Managing Director, Aerial Facilities Limited.
- Susan Elizabeth, Mrs Davies, Director, The Photographers' Gallery Limited.
- Michael Henry Davis, Grade 6, Department of Transport.
- William Henry Deakin. For services to County Planning particularly in Kent.
- Alexander Patrick Cuming Dickson, Director, Dickson Nurseries Limited, County Down, Northern Ireland.
- Kenneth Dudley, lately Director-General, Campden Food Preservation Research Association.
- Anthony John Hast Durham, Deputy Chairman, Cambridge Newspapers Limited.
- James Millar Eckford, General Manager, Ayrshire and Arran Health Board.
- Robert Leadam Eddison, Actor.
- Felicity Clare, Mrs Edwards, lately Senior Employment Medical Adviser, Rehabilitation, Health and Safety Executive.
- Nancy, Mrs Elliott, Senior Inspector, Primary Education, Newcastle upon Tyne Local Education Authority.
- Maurice Alfred El Wood, lately Principal Scientific Officer, Ministry of Defence.
- David Eurof Evans, Site General Manager, Amersham International plc, Cardiff.
- Alan Fenwick, Grade 7, Overseas Development Administration.
- Miss Barbara Mary Fewster (Mrs Wilkinson), Associate Director, The Royal Ballet School.
- Brigadier Richard Harry Fisher, M.B.E., M.C., Vice-President, County Durham Branch, Soldiers' Sailors' and Airmen's Families Association.
- John Allan Fleming, Consultant Veterinary Adviser to the Royal Air Force.
- Keith Fox, Chairman and Managing Director, Blackwood Bros. Limited, Kilmarnock.
- Captain John Lionel Francis, D.L. For political and public service.
- Harry Frith, Chairman of Trustee Directors, Pilots' National Pension Fund Trust Company Limited.
- John Charles Gale, lately Principal Professional and Technology Officer, Ministry of Defence.
- Thomas Noel Cheney Garfit, lately Member, Process Plant and Engineering Construction, Economic Development Committee.
- Peter Harry Gayward, Director of Finance, University of Liverpool.
- Alan Johnston Gibson, lately President, Institute of Chartered Accountants in Ireland.
- John Eifion Goss, Headteacher, Broadway Comprehensive School, Birmingham.
- Daphne Jasmine Elliott, Mrs Gould, Headteacher, Mulberry School, Tower Hamlets, Inner London Education Authority.
- The Reverend William Robert Nelson Gray, lately Executive Producer, Religious Programmes, Scottish Television plc.
- Norma Lea, Mrs Green. For political service.
- Professor Peter Arthur Green, Dean, Faculty of Art and Design, Middlesex Polytechnic.
- Lionel Harry Grundy, Deputy Chief Constable, Wiltshire Constabulary.
- John Philip Hall, Principal, Board of Customs and Excise.
- Miss Martha Hamilton (Mrs Steedman), lately Headmistress, St Leonards School, St Andrews.
- Thomas Allingham Hamilton, Principal, Glengormley High School, County Antrim.
- Elizabeth Ivy, Her Grace the Dowager Duchess of Hamilton and Brandon, D.L. For services to the Lamp of Lothian Collegiate Trust.
- Bernard Hammond, Manager, Test Division, Southern Electricity Board.
- Leonard Harris, Director, Central Area, British Coal Corporation.
- Harold Hassall. For services to the community in Cheshire.
- Pamela Norah Elizabeth, Mrs Hawton. For political and public service.
- Mary Xenia, Lady Henderson. For services to British Fashion Design.
- Stuart Hendy, Partner, Faulkner-Brown, Hendy, Watkinson Stoner.
- Beresford Ivan Henry, Co-ordinator and Company Secretary, Handsworth Employment Scheme.
- James Henry, Chairman and Managing Director, Henry Brothers (Magherafelt) Limited.
- Frank Norry Hogg, Principal, Welsh College of Librarianship.
- Anthony David Hopkins, Chairman and Managing Director, Delta Sound Limited.
- Jadwiga, Mrs Howells, Grade 7, Department of the Environment.
- Miss Janet Latta Picken Hunter, Consultant Paediatrician, Grimsby Hospital Group.
- Maria Luisa, Countess of Iddesleigh, D.L., President, Devon Branch, The British Red Cross Society.
- Mary (Marie) Isabella, Mrs Jack, Principal, The Arts Educational Trust School, Tring, Hertfordshire.
- Robert Hugh Jackson, M.C., Medical Consultant, Child Accident Prevention Trust.
- Brian Jarman, General Medical Practitioner; Professor of Primary Care, St Mary's Hospital Medical School.
- Elgar Spencer Jenkins, Leader, Bath City Council.
- Michael David Jenner, Process Innovation Manager, Mullard Limited.
- Geoffrey Arthur Jennings, Leader, Brentwood District Council.
- John Anthony William Jennings. For services to the Catholic Fund for Overseas Development.
- William Maurice Johnston, M.B.E., Assistant Chief Constable, Royal Ulster Constabulary.
- Roy Charles Jones, Principal, Department of the Environment.
- Vincent Kane. For services to Broadcasting in Wales.
- Miss Olga Kennard. For services to Scientific Research on the Structure of Biological Molecules.
- Noel Kirton, Chairman, Cleveland Area Manpower Board.
- Eddie (Elias George) Kulukundis. For services to Sport.
- Peter Edmund Lake, Head of Department of Reproductive Physiology, Institute of Animal Physiology and Genetics Research, Edinburgh, Agricultural and Food Research Council.
- Professor David Layton. For services to Science Education.
- Miss Daphne Orynthia Learmont, lately Nursing Officer, Department of Health and Social Security.
- Norman William Lee, County Engineer and Surveyor, Avon.
- Jonathan Andrew Leitch, Deputy Managing Director, Dynamics Division, Stevenage, British Aerospace plc.
- The Honourable Robin William Lewis, Managing Director, Physiological Instrumentation Limited, Whitland, Dyfed.
- Leonard Arthur George Linden, Production and Engineering Director, Negretti Aviation Limited.
- John Walter Lloyd, Director, Regional Pain Relief Unit, Oxford.
- James Logan, lately Vice-Chairman, Scottish Arts Council.
- Eric James Macfarlane, Principal, Queen Mary's Sixth Form College, Basingstoke, Hampshire.
- Peter Malcolmson, Director of Social Work, Shetland Islands Council.
- William Martin, Chief Executive, Coventry Churches Housing Association.
- Jeffery George Mathieson, Deputy City Surveyor, Corporation of London.
- David Edward Moore Maxwell, Principal, Clondermot High School, Londonderry.
- Edward Fredrick May, Director, Schlumberger Industries (Sangamo-Metering).
- William McEwan, Director Scottish School of Non-Destructive Testing, Paisley College of Technology.
- Andrew McKibbin, Consultant, Erne Hospital, Enniskillen, Northern Ireland.
- John Francis Valentine McMurray, Principal, Department of Health and Social Services, Northern Ireland.
- James McWilliam, Chairman, Highland Health Board.
- John William Marc Meston, Controller, Occupational Safety and Hygiene, Rank Hovis McDougall.
- Major Peter Victor Moore (Retd.). For services to Rural Conservation.
- Henry John Nash, Chairman, Firsteel Manufacturing Limited.
- George Henry Neal. For services to the mentally handicapped.
- Jesse Richard New, Executive Director, Personnel, Marshall of Cambridge (Engineering) Limited.
- Sir Iain Andrew Noble, Bt. For services to Gaelic Language and Culture.
- Ian David Nussey, Manager, Warwick Development Group, IBM United Kingdom Limited.
- Egil Robert Orskov, Senior Principal Scientific Officer, Rowett Research Institute, Aberdeen.
- Miss Joan Owens, Principal, Northern Ireland Office.
- Henry Anthony Pawson. For services to Angling.
- George Walter Pekarek, General Manager, Commercial, Albright and Wilson Limited.
- Thomas Heydon Penson. For political and public service.
- Ray Buchanan, Mrs Pigott. For political service.
- Harold Pinder. For political and public service.
- Derek Edward Pipe, Senior Principal, Board of Inland Revenue.
- Raymond Arthur Pittock, Grade 7, The Patent Office.
- Derrick James Branscomb Platt, Chairman, Eastbourne Health Authority and Eastbourne Association of Voluntary Service.
- Miss Jennifer Poland, Director, Unit of Veterinary Continuing Education, Royal Veterinary College.
- Colin Harold Pothecary, Partner, MRM Partnership, Consulting Engineers.
- Dawson Price, Principal Establishment Officer, London Headquarters, United Kingdom Atomic Energy Authority.
- Canon William Frederick Reid, lately Secretary, Church of England Hospital Chaplaincies Council.
- John Alistair Riddell, General Practitioner, Glasgow.
- Richard Frank Rimmer, lately Deputy Managing Director, YARD Limited, Glasgow.
- Julian Mervyn Roberts, Consultant Psychiatrist, St James' Hospital, Leeds, and High Royds' Hospital, Menston.
- Robert William Kelly Cupples Rogerson, Chairman, Committee on Access for Scotland.
- Daniel Clive Thomas Rowlands. For services to Rugby Union Football.
- Robert William Russell, Principal Professional and Technology Officer, Ministry of Defence.
- Douglas Cecil Rustom, D.F.C., Executive Secretary, Association of International Courier and Express Services.
- William John Saint, Chief Executive, North West Europe, BP Petroleum Development Limited.
- Gordon Ramsay Scott. For services to Tropical Veterinary Medicine.
- Laurence Alfred Scudder, Senior Principal, Home Office.
- Mortimer (Tim) Shapley. For services to Mobility for the Disabled.
- Terence John Siggs, Deputy Assistant Commissioner, Metropolitan Police.
- Allen Simmen, Principal, Scottish Home and Health Department.
- Frank Alexander Sims, Chief Executive, Pell Frischmann Consultants Limited.
- Francis William Sleeman, Inspector (P), Board of Inland Revenue.
- Eric Watson Smith, Industrial Relations Director, Yarrow Shipbuilders Limited.
- Margaret Watson, Mrs Smith. For political and public service.
- Maurice George Smith, Chairman, Knights Association of Christian Youth Clubs, Lambeth.
- Thomas Smith, Managing Director, Thomas Smith and Sons (Kirkoswald) Limited.
- Thomas Peter Snape, General Secretary, SecondaryHeads' Association.
- Kenneth George Edwin Spink. For political and public service.
- Roger Charlton Spoor. For services to the community in Newcastle upon Tyne.
- The Reverend Brother Cornelius (John) Sreenan, lately Head, St Boniface's College, Plymouth.
- John Robin Stayt, lately Chief Commissioner, The Scout Association.
- James Stewart, Member, Fire Authority for Northern Ireland.
- John Barry Bingham Stewart, Member, Scottish Agricultural Wages Board.
- Miss Patricia Creswick Stocken. For political service.
- Martin William Suthers. For political and public service.
- Merrick Wentworth Taylor, Deputy Chairman and Managing Director, Motor Panels (Coventry) Ltd.
- John Hedley Brian Tew, External Professor of Economics, Loughborough University. For public service.
- Archibald Grahame Thomson, Director, Scottish Daily Newspaper Society.
- William Paterson Loudoun Thomson, Rector, Kirkwall Grammar School, Orkney.
- Sydney Frederick Tongue, lately Chief Executive, Wrexham Maelor Borough Council.
- Major Alexander Trimmer R.E. (Retd.), Secretary, Quantity Surveyors Division, Royal Institution of Chartered Surveyors.
- Geoffrey Wensley Trotter, Chairman, London Taxi Board.
- Donald Alexander Gordon Troup. For services to Agriculture and Land Agency.
- John Oliver Warrillow Tunnell, Leader, Scottish Chamber Orchestra.
- Robert John Tyler, President, National Federation of Meat Traders.
- Joseph Michael Valdes Scott, Chief Executive, Latin America Trade Advisory Group. For services to Export.
- Julia Colleen, Mrs Veale, Member, Prison Service Board of Visitors, H.M. Prison, Channings Wood.
- Rita Joyce, Mrs Waite, Area Organiser, East Midlands, Women's Royal Voluntary Service.
- Joseph Walker, Senior Director, Walkers Shortbread Limited, Aberlour.
- Captain Brian Owen Walpole, General Manager, Concorde, British Airways plc.
- Robert Gordon Weaver, Chief Executive, Fisheries Conservancy Board, Northern Ireland.
- Trevor Hugh Webb. For political and public service.
- Major Geoffrey Hildred Webb-Bowen (Retd.) D.L., lately Chairman, Stoke-on-Trent Advisory Committee on Justices of the Peace. For services to the Magistracy.
- Professor John Roger Webster, lately Chairman, Post Office User's Council and Advisory Committee on Telecommunications, Wales.
- Michael John David Westbrook, Jazz Musician and Composer.
- Alan Rogers Whitehead, Inspector (SP), Board of Inland Revenue.
- Frederick George Wilcox, lately Special Projects Manager, Commercial Department, Devonport Management Limited.
- David Cranston Williams, Chairman, Area Manpower Board, Dyfed and West Glamorgan, Manpower Services Commission.
- John Brinley Williams, lately Managing Director, Associated British Ports; Director, Associated British Ports Holdings plc.
- John James Hiam Wilson, Director, Frederick Hiam Limited, Bury St Edmunds, Suffolk.
- Winifred Mary, Mrs Wilson, Chairman, Children Nationwide Research Fund.
- Phoebe Madeline, Mrs Winch. For political service.
- Cecil Douglas Woodward, Director, Fire Protection Association.

Diplomatic Service and Overseas List

- Alistair Peter Asprey, A.E., J.P. For public services in Hong Kong.
- Jeffrey Christopher Astwood. For public services in Bermuda.
- William David Brown, British Council Representative, Kuwait.
- Brian George John Canty, Deputy Governor, Bermuda.
- Edward Graham Mellish Chaplin, lately Head of Chancery, British Interests Section, Tehran.
- Dr Chiu Hin-Kwong, J.P. For public and community services in Hong Kong.
- George William Clarke, lately Adviser, Statistical Office, Commission of the EC, Brussels.
- Dr Geoffrey Roy Courts, lately British Council Deputy Representative, Nigeria.
- Roger Kenneth Eve. For services to British commercial interests in Maryland, USA.
- Michael Derek Ford. For services to British commercial interests in Belgium.
- Dr Victor Fung Kwok-king. For Public and community services in Hong Kong.
- Nicholas Lawrence Gorton. For services to British aviation interests in Frankfurt.
- Geoffrey Gordon Hardwicke. For services to British commercial interests in Bangladesh.
- Simon Robert Mark Heathcote, Foreign and Commonwealth Office.
- Leslie Hodgson. For services to British commercial and community interests in Nigeria.
- Robin Anthony Jowit. For services to British commercial and community interests in Lisbon.
- Jeremy Long, First Secretary (Administration), H.M. Embassy, Islamabad.
- John Frederick Matthews. For services to British commercial and community interests in São Paulo.
- Miss Ann Eliza Alfreda Meade, Permanent Secretary and Chief Establishment Officer, Montserrat.
- Howard Andrew Clive Morrison, lately Chief Magistrate, Fiji.
- Robert Vivian Pearce. For services to British commercial interests in Japan.
- Ivor Jon Rawlinson, H.M. Consul, Florence.
- David Frederick Charles Ridgway, lately Chargé d'Affaires, H.M. Embassy, San Salvador.
- Francis Xavier Rooney, lately Puisne Judge, Fiji.
- Professor Patricia Mary Shaw de Urdiales. For services to English studies in Spain.
- Harvey Nolan James Smith, English Language Teaching Adviser (British Council), Government of Mali.
- William Arthur Tincey, lately First Secretary (Commercial), British High Commission, Nairobi.
- Dennis Ting Hok-Shou, J.P. For public and community services in Hong Kong.
- John Baird Tyson, M.C. For services to education in Nepal.
- Edward Bevan Waide, lately Resident Representative, IBRD, New Delhi.
- Miss Jean Margaret Watson. For nursing and welfare services to lepers in East Africa and Malaysia.
- Norman Charles Weston. For services to British commercial and community interests in Colombia.
- John Michael Wood, M.B.E. For services to education in Kenya.
- Robert Hamilton Wright. For services to the British community in Calcutta.

==== Member of the Order of the British Empire (MBE) ====
Military Division

- Lieutenant Commander Phillip John Wheler Bush, Royal Navy.
- Lieutenant Colin Donald Carter, Royal Navy.
- Lieutenant Commander Edward Albert Chambers, Royal Navy.
- Warrant Officer (Seaman) Kan Fu Chung.
- Lieutenant Commander David John Cringle, Royal Navy.
- Warrant Officer (Master-at-Arms) Michael John Anan Dulson.
- Lieutenant Commander John Vivian Harris, Royal Naval Reserve.
- Lieutenant Commander John William Hicks, Royal Navy.
- Lieutenant Commander Roy William Lambert, Royal Navy.
- Lieutenant Commander (SCC) Geoffrey Preshner, Royal Naval Reserve.
- Lieutenant Jeremy Richard Townley, Royal Navy.
- Lieutenant David Thomas Walker, Royal Marines.
- Lieutenant Mark Edward Charles Walton, Royal Navy.
- Warrant Officer (Communications Technician) Michael Wilkinson.
- Lieutenant Commander Ronald Leslie Yerrill, Royal Navy.
- Captain Jeremy Wilfred Lloyd Shepherdson Avery, The Parachute Regiment, Territorial Army.
- Major John Joseph Bento, The Bermuda Regiment.
- Major (Quartermaster) Ronald Thomas Bevan, 2nd King Edward VII's Own Gurkha Rifles (The Sirmoor Rifles).
- Warrant Officer Class 2 Livingstone Boyd, Royal Regiment of Artillery, Territorial Army.
- Warrant Officer Class 1 Arthur Grahame Bradshaw, Army Catering Corps.
- Major Andrew John Briggs, Royal Corps of Signals.
- Major (Quartermaster) Harry Roy Burnett, The Light Infantry.
- Major (Quartermaster) Ronald Cecil Coleman, Royal Regiment of Artillery.
- Major Stewart James Crowe, Royal Army Ordnance Corps.
- Major Michael John Dent, Royal Corps of Signals.
- Major Anthony Paul Domeisen, The Royal Anglian Regiment.
- Major Anthony Harrison Douglas, Corps of Royal Engineers.
- Major Roger Alan Dudin, Corps of Royal Engineers.
- Major Graham Richard Elliot, Royal Corps of Signals.
- Captain (Quartermaster) Clifton Luther Fields, Royal Regiment of Artillery.
- Warrant Officer Class 2 Ronald Gordon, Royal Army Pay Corps, Territorial Army.
- Major Reginald Griffiths, T.D., Royal Army Pay Corps, Territorial Army.
- Captain Thomas Edwin Hall, Royal Corps of Signals, Territorial Army.
- Major John Richard Ibbotson, The Parachute Regiment.
- Warrant Officer Class 1 Stephen Francis Joseph, Corps of Royal Electrical and Mechanical Engineers.
- Captain Bernard Francis Kane, Mercian Volunteers, Territorial Army.
- Major John Seumas Kerr, Royal Army Ordnance Corps.
- Major Gerald David Kneale, Royal Corps of Transport.
- Major Graeme Cameron Maxwell Lamb, Queen's Own Highlanders (Seaforth and Camerons).
- Major Gerard Courtney Middleton, Royal Regiment of Artillery.
- Captain John Frederick Milward, The Royal Anglian Regiment, Territorial Army.
- Major Robert James Moore, Royal Corps of Signals, Territorial Army.
- Major John Barry Morgan, Royal Army Ordnance Corps.
- Major Michael Duncan Arthur Morris, Royal Regiment of Artillery.
- Captain Alan William Martin Petch, T.D., The Royal Anglian Regiment, Territorial Army.
- Major David Michael Gurney Randall, Royal Corps of Transport.
- Warrant Officer Class 2 Alan John Slade, Royal Regiment of Artillery.
- Warrant Officer Class 1 Terence Charles Spicer, Royal Corps of Signals.
- Major (Quartermaster) William Roger Stafford, The Duke of Edinburgh's Royal Regiment (Berkshire and Wiltshire).
- The Reverend Herbert Edward Steed, Chaplain to the Forces 3rd Class, Royal Army Chaplains' Department, Territorial Army.
- Captain (Electrical Mechanical Assistant Engineer) John Taylor, Corps of Royal Electrical and Mechanical Engineers.
- Captain (Quartermaster) Harold Alwyn Vibert Toney, The Royal Irish Rangers (27th (Inniskilling) 83rd and 87th).
- Major Garth Jon Whitty, Corps of Royal Engineers.
- Major Aidwin James Glendinning Wight, M.C., Welsh Guards.
- Warrant Officer Class 2 Oliver Nicholas Bogle Willmott, Corps of Royal Engineers.
- Captain Barrie Edward Wright, Royal Tank Regiment.
- Squadron Leader Nicholas Robert Chandler, Royal Air Force.
- Squadron Leader John Sutherland Douglas, Royal Air Force.
- Squadron Leader John Geoffrey Elliott, Royal Air Force.
- Squadron Leader Brynmor Evans, Royal Air Force.
- Warrant Officer David Andrew Guy, Royal Air Force.
- Warrant Officer David John Helson, Royal Air Force.
- Flight Lieutenant Willie Huggins, Royal Air Force (Retd.)
- Squadron Leader Eric James Alfred Hughes, Royal Air Force.
- Squadron Leader George Everritt Huntley, Royal Air Force Volunteer Reserve (Training).
- Flight Lieutenant Erhard Walter Jungmayr, Royal Air Force.
- Warrant Officer Robert Harvey Keay, Royal Air Force.
- Squadron Leader James Robert Lees, Royal Air Force.
- Squadron Leader Richard Charles Moore, Royal Air Force.
- Squadron Leader Glenn Stewart Pearson, Royal Air Force.
- Squadron Leader Stuart Luff Pierce, Royal Air Force.
- Warrant Officer Ian Reeves, Royal Air Force.
- Warrant Officer Robert Lewis Semple, Royal Air Force.
- Warrant Officer Alexander Murray Simpson, B.E.M., Royal Air Force.
- Flight Lieutenant Brian Turner Stockman, Royal Air Force.
- Warrant Officer Keith John Teesdale, A.P.M., Royal Air Force.
- Warrant Officer Edward Alan Tointon, Royal Air Force.
- Squadron Leader John McMillan Tweedley, Royal Air Force.
- Squadron Leader David Charles Vass, Royal Air Force.
- Squadron Leader Richard Stafford Waters, Royal Air Force.
- Reverend (Squadron Leader) Ivan John Weston, Royal Air Force.
- Warrant Officer Robert Bewley Wren, Royal Air Force.

Civil Division

- Donald Allen. For services to the community in Sittingbourne, Kent.
- Rosa Anna, Mrs Allen, Freelance Interpreter and Translator.
- Jack Deighton Appleby, Divisional Surveyor, Durham County Council.
- Pauline Winifred, Mrs Armitage, Area Principal for Adult Education, Adult Education Centre, Swinton, Manchester.
- Donald Attwood, Divisional Director, Paper, Printing, Packaging Industries Research Association.
- Miss Kay Ball Dodd, Civilian Medical Practitioner, North East District.
- Miss Pamela Grace Blundell Bankart, Commercial Consultant, John Brown plc. For services to Export.
- Brenda Anne, Mrs Barnes, Secretary, Devon County Association for the Blind.
- George Barr. For services to the Ayrshire Branch, Multiple Sclerosis Society.
- Eric Tom Beauchamp, Assistant Secretary, Biscuit, Cake, Chocolate and Confectionery Alliance.
- Clifford Douglas Bedford. For political service.
- John Robert Bell, Executive Officer, Board of Customs and Excise.
- Kenneth Ridley Bell, Chief Executive, Ken Bell (International) Limited. For services to Export.
- Bernard Charles Beresford, Local Officer II, Department of Health and Social Security.
- Raghubir Sain Berry, Collector, Board of Inland Revenue.
- Norman Wilfred Beswick, lately Librarian, Institute of Education Library, University of London.
- Leslie Albert Biggs, Chief Estimator, Marconi Radar Systems Limited, Chelmsford.
- Bernard Birn, Chairman, Southend-on-Sea Music Club.
- Anthony Bolton. For services to the Scout Association, Greater London.
- Thomas George Boobyer. For political service.
- The Reverend Peter John Bowes. For services to the Ark Housing Association.
- Denys Webster Bradfield, Secretary, National Federation of Fishmongers.
- Charles Noel Brannigan, Chief Officer, Northern Ireland Airports Constabulary.
- Denise Jessie, Mrs Brett. For services to the Leukaemia and Cancer Children's Fund, Scotland.
- Kenneth Albert Brixey, lately Stores Officer B, H.M. Stationery Office.
- James Ignatius Brockie, Estate Forestry Manager, Hamilton District Council.
- Miss Winifred Annie Bromhead, Administrative Officer, Department of Employment.
- Cecil Ernest Brown, Deputy Leader, Kettering Borough Council.
- Dorothy, Mrs Brown, Chairman, Bristol Visual and Environmental Group.
- John Brown. For services to the community in Bedlington, Northumberland.
- Ada Margaret, Mrs Bryan, Tax Officer, Higher Grade, Board of Inland Revenue.
- Douglas Henry Bryant. For services to the Ulster Savings Movement.
- Miss Patricia Bryden. Registrar, Births, Deaths and Marriages, Gretna.
- Major Clifford Fordyce Burke (Retd.), lately Superintendent, Forth District Salmon Fishery Board.
- Gerard Burns, Clerk and Chief Executive, Fermanagh District Council.
- John Butcher, Deputy Chief Executive, Director of Administration and Secretary, Footwear Technology Centre, Shoe and Allied Trades Research Association.
- Miss Diana Frances Butler, lately Research Assistant, Cabinet Office.
- Martha Grant, Mrs Calder, Area Organiser, East of Scotland, King George's Fund for Sailors.
- Major Allan John Cameron (Retd.), D.L., Member, Ross and Cromarty District Council.
- Miss Elizabeth Rae Cameron, Principal Nursing Officer, British Airways.
- Jean Blair, Mrs Campbell, Headteacher, Glendale Primary School, Glasgow.
- Justin James Cartwright. For political service.
- Peter Cave, Senior Manager, Head of Refit and Build Analysis, Naval Electronics & Space Division, Filton, British Aerospace.
- Annie Morfina, Mrs Chalmers. For political service.
- Thomas Chalmers, lately Senior Executive Officer, Scottish Office.
- Miss Joyce Ivy Evelyn Chapman, Social Worker, Norfolk Social Services Department.
- Walter Robert Chapman, lately Senior Executive Officer, Manpower Services Commission.
- Eric Douglas MacDonald Cheyne, Foreign and Commonwealth Office.
- Lenin Basil Christodoulides, General Production Manager and Safety Officer, Carless Solvents, Harwich.
- John Geoffrey Clarke, lately Chief Housing Officer, Stratford-on-Avon District Council.
- Eric William Collins, A.E. For public service and service to the community in Richmondshire.
- Cyril James Cooper, General Secretary, English Schools Cricket Association.
- Morigue, Mrs Cornwell, Mobility Centre Superintendent, Banstead Place, Banstead, Surrey.
- Owen John Corrigan, Senior Executive Officer, Ministry of Defence.
- Dorothy, Mrs Crayford, Primary School Teacher, Co-ordinator for Mathematics and Science, Wybers Wood First School, Grimsby.
- Maurice Anthony Curran, Higher Professional and Technology Officer, Department of the Environment.
- Joan, Mrs Darbyshire, Headteacher, Model Village Primary School, Shirebrook, Derbyshire.
- David John Davies, lately Head of Technical Services, South Wales Area, British Coal Corporation.
- Miss Laura Jane Davies. For services to Women's Golf.
- Maldwyn Davies, Export Marketing Director, Dowty Mining Equipment Limited. For services to Export.
- William Daniel (Danny) Davies, President, Llanybydder Branch, The Royal British Legion.
- Steve Davis. For services to Snooker.
- Margaret Winifred, Mrs Davoll, Local Officer II, Department of Health and Social Security.
- Alan Dey, Chief Superintendent, Northumbria Police.
- John Dinsmore, Manager, Londonderry Office, Belfast Telegraph.
- Ronald Albert Dolbear, lately Dockmaster, Babcock-Thorn Limited, Rosyth.
- Jack William Donovan, lately Higher Professional and Technology Officer, Ministry of Agriculture, Fisheries and Food.
- Anthony Paul Doyle. For services to Cycling.
- Michael William Dugmore, Administrative Officer, Department of Health and Social Security.
- Peter Harry Duke, Principal Lecturer, Youth and Community Work, Leicester Polytechnic.
- Alison Zoe, Mrs Edmonds, Headteacher, Denbigh Infant School, Luton, Bedfordshire.
- Richard Foster Edward-Collins, Chairman, War Pensions Committee, Cornwall and Isles of Stilly.
- Miss Joan Evelyn Elliott, lately Secretary, Joint Examination Board for Orthopaedic Nursing.
- John Malcolm Elliott, Managing Director, EBAC Limited.
- Miss Mildred Emmett, Group Fire Control Officer, Greater Manchester Fire Service.
- Colin George James Emmins. For political and public service.
- Miss Joan Olive Essen, Administrative Assistant, Board of Inland Revenue.
- David Sydney Endle Evans, Auxiliary Lieutenant, Royal Naval Auxiliary Service.
- Maurice Leslie Evans, Higher Professional and Technology Officer, Ministry of Defence.
- Miss Sylvia Emmeline Evans, Headteacher, Oldford Nursery and Infants School, Powys.
- Frederick Walter Eve, lately General Manager, Standard Telephones and Cables plc, Treforest, Mid Glamorgan.
- Susan Mary, Mrs Evershed, D. L. Member, Chichester Health Authority; Chairman, Mental Handicap Planning Group.
- Margaret Joan, Mrs Farrer, Payroll Supervisor, SERCO Limited.
- Roy Stanley Faulconbridge, Finance Manager, Lucas Industrial Components Limited.
- Keith Anthony Ferrin. For political and public service.
- George Fisher, lately Senior Nurse, Clinical and Managerial Mental Handicap Services, Strathmartine Hospital, Dundee.
- Diana Mary, Mrs Fishwick, Member, South West Area Museum Council.
- Alfred Henry Frank Fooks, Organiser, Agriculture and Allied Trades Group, Transport and General Workers' Union.
- William Frederick Forman, Member, Bournemouth Borough Council.
- Emmanuel Franks, Restaurateur, Caterer and Retailer.
- Frederic Berlin Gentle, Senior Executive Officer, Office of Population Censuses and Surveys.
- Margaret Joan, Mrs Geoghegan, Chairman, Hospice for Rochdale Appeal.
- John Arthur George. For services to agriculture in Wales.
- Geoffrey Alfred George Gibbons, Secretary, Isle of Wight Association of Local Councils.
- Alec Alfred Gibson. For services to the community in Tamworth, Staffordshire.
- Mary Scott, Mrs Ginnelly, Senior Personal Secretary, Lord Chancellor's Department.
- Miss Jean Doris Glassberg, lately Bursar, Ilford County High School, London Borough of Redbridge.
- Miss Eileen Edith Gleadle-Richards, Staff Officer, Grade II, Gloucestershire Branch, St John Ambulance Brigade.
- Terence James Goldrick, Director, Engineering and Consultancy, Freight Transport Association Limited.
- Elizabeth Davidson, Mrs Goodhew, Keeper of Education, Horniman Museum and Library.
- Margaret Glenis, Mrs Goodyear, Higher Executive Officer, Department of Education and Science.
- Miss Heather St Clair Gordon, Head Occupational Therapist, Southern General Hospital, Glasgow.
- Robert Wilson Graham, Inspector, Metropolitan Police.
- Jack Grime. For services to the community in Lancashire.
- Francis Estlin Christopher Grundy. For services to the Magistracy.
- James Ross Guy, Member, Derry City Council.
- Cecil Robson Hall, Chief Engineer, Resinous Chemicals Limited.
- Miss Audrey Handbury, Health Visitor and Fieldwork Teacher, Milton Keynes Health Authority.
- Michael Hardcastle, Writer of Children's books.
- Jack Vincent Harding, Head of Department, Mechanical and Motor Vehicle Engineering, Kingston College of Further Education.
- Derek Harper, lately Deputy Clerk to the Justices, Manchester.
- Geoffrey Farrar Harper. For political service.
- Kenneth William Harris, Distribution Manager, Rugby Portland plc.
- Luke Daniel Hasson, Owner and Managing Director, Austin & Co Limited, Londonderry.
- James Angus Hatfield. For charitable services and services to Yachting.
- William Henry Hayden. For services to the community in Watford, Hertfordshire.
- Miss Sally Haynes, Vice-President,[British Paraplegic Sports Society.
- Barbara Barnes, Mrs Helsby, Chairman, Halton Arts, Widnes.
- Miss Maura Christina Evelyn Henderson, Staff Officer, Department of Health and Social Services, Northern Ireland.
- Unity Brogan, Mrs Henry, Director of Student Services, Dundee College of Technology.
- James Hepburn, Inspector, Fife Constabulary.
- Miss Aleen Mary Herdman. For voluntary services in Northern Ireland.
- Henry Michael Hession, lately Chief Commandant, Norfolk Special Constabulary.
- Mary Elizabeth Catherine, Mrs Hitchcock, Senior Personal Secretary, Ministry of Defence.
- Keith Gordon Hodson, Executive Director, Hawk (USA), Military Aircraft Division, Kingston upon Thames, British Aerospace plc.
- Miss Dora Emily Hoehns-Henschel, Director, Midwifery Services, Camberwell Health Authority.
- Philip Oliver Holmes, lately Senior Professional and Technology Officer, Ministry of Defence.
- Bryan Holton, Technical and Development Director, D. Anderson and Son Limited.
- Thomas Hood, Chief Superintendent, Royal Ulster Constabulary.
- Frank Howard. For political and public service.
- William Forster Hudson, lately Administrative Officer, Department of Health and Social Security.
- Miss Nerys Myfanwy Hughes, District Physiotherapist, Clwyd Health Authority.
- Doreen, Mrs Hunt, Senior Executive Officer, Ministry of Defence.
- Maurice Vyvyan Ingram, Chairman, Executive Committee Fish Farming, National Farmers' Union, England and Wales.
- Anthony Woof Jackson, Director and Company Secretary, Thompson and Jackson Limited, Lancaster.
- Charles William Jacob. For services to charitable and educational organisations in Wales.
- Miss Evelyn Audrey Ker James, General Secretary, Scottish Headquarters, Girl Guides Association.
- Terry John Jarrett, lately Senior Executive Officer, National Institute of Medical Research, Medical Research Council.
- Miss Pamela Mary Johnson, Diabetes Liaison Health Visitor, Ipswich.
- Raymond Leslie Johnson. For services to the Employment of the Disabled.
- Ian Alexander Johnstone, Higher Professional and Technology Officer, Commonwealth War Graves Commission.
- David Jones, President, Durham Aged Mineworkers' Homes Association].
- Frederick Jordan, Chairman, Stockton Branch, The Royal Air Force Association.
- Eric Maclean Kean, lately Member, Edinburgh District Council.
- Gladys Joan, Mrs Keane, Service Welfare Adviser, The Light Division Depot, Shrewsbury, Women's Royal Voluntary Service.
- Richard Kearton, Manager, Personnel and Administration, Humber Refinery, Conoco Limited.
- Thomas Peter Keighley. For political and public service.
- Mary Patricia, Mrs Kendrick, lately Principal Scientific Officer, Hydraulics Research Limited.
- Doreen Violet, Mrs Kenyon, Member, National Council, National Association of Victim's Support Schemes.
- Leonard Arthur Ketcher, Higher Executive Officer, House of Lords.
- Gwendoline Vera, Mrs Kimber, Administrative Officer, The Patent Office.
- David Kinghorn, Deputy Head, Scott Sutherland School of Architecture, Aberdeen.
- Anthony Kirton, lately Superintendent, Surrey Constabulary.
- Gwendoline Iris, Mrs Kite, lately Ward Sister, Powick Hospital, Worcester and District Health Authority.
- Alexander Wilson Lam Be, Safety and Administrative Officer, Federation of Building and Civil Engineering Contractors, Northern Ireland.
- Miss Joan Lambert, Shorthand Typist, Bedfordshire Police.
- Alfred Whiteman Lawrence. For services to the Bedfordshire Branch, Soldiers' Sailors' and Airmen's Families Association.
- Patricia Caroline, Mrs Lester, Fabric and Fashion Designer, Patricia Lester Ltd., Abergavenny, Gwent.
- Dennis Edward Lewis, Commercial Director, FlightRefuelling Aviation Limited.
- Lewis Islwyn Lewis, Staff Officer, Board of Inland Revenue.
- Dennis William Lithgow, lately Head of Training Operations, South Eastern Electricity Board.
- Charles William Little, Regional Director, Greater London & Home Counties Branch, The Forces Help Society and Lord Roberts Workshops.
- Brian Gordon Lock, lately Head of Engineering, Local Radio.
- Richard Lowry, Finance and Administration Officer, Research and Development EngineeringResearch Station, British Gas plc.
- Alexander Lowson. For services to Industry, Arbroath.
- Agnes McDonald, Mrs Lyle. For services to Scouting and the community in Hawick.
- Miss Eileen Mairi Maccoll, General Practitioner, Killin, Perthshire.
- Isobel Duncan, Mrs Mackenzie. For services to Scottish Women's Rural Institutes.
- Robert Douglas Matten. For political service.
- Rachel Sylvia Clegg, Mrs Matthews, Emergency Services, Bedford, Women's Royal Voluntary Service.
- Miss Doreen Maude, lately Drawing Office Services Supervisor, David Brown Gear Industries Limited.
- Thomas Walter Aitken McBain. For services to the fishing industry.
- Isabella Frances, Mrs McCall, lately Chairman, Calvay Housing Co-operative Limited, Glasgow.
- Miss Eileen McCarthy, lately Executive Officer, Department of Health and Social Security.
- Mary Elizabeth, Mrs McGeough, lately Nursing Officer, Hamilton.
- Betty, Mrs McInnes. For political service.
- Miss Kinn Hamilton McIntosh. For services to the Girl Guides Association.
- Margaretta, Mrs McIntyre. For services to the Parents and Friends of Muckamore Abbey Special Care Hospital, Northern Ireland.
- William McKerrell, General Practitioner, Clachan Seil, Argyll.
- Ronald Hugh McKie, Consultant, Royal Institute of British Architects Publications Limited.
- Joseph McLean. For political service.
- Miss Diana McMahon, Programme Director, Industry Matters.
- James Ossian Lament McNeilage. For political service.
- Sheelagh Margaret Mary, Mrs McRandal, Partner, Fergus Gilligan Consulting Engineers.
- Edward William McWilliams. For services to the Boys' Brigade.
- Robert Megraw. For voluntary services to Youth.
- Miss Merle Melford-Colegate, Welfare Officer, the Royal Star and Garter Home, Richmond, Surrey.
- Robert Lawrence Metcalfe, Chairman, Brighton and Hove Co-ordinating Committee, Duke of Edinburgh's Award Scheme.
- Freda, Mrs Middleton, Chairman, National Schizophrenia Fellowship, Scotland.
- Sydney Millar. For services to Rugby Union Football.
- Mary Kathleen, Mrs Miller, Vice-President and Hospital Liaison Officer, South Glamorgan Branch, The British Red Cross Society.
- Thomas Moffat, Chairman, Durham Small Business Club.
- Alan Ernest Mole, Technical Director, Kent Messenger Group.
- Christopher Philip Streatfield Morley, Marketing and Export Director, Matbro Limited.
- Isabella McGregor Steel, Mrs Morrison, Nursing Officer, Community, Lothian Health Board.
- Kenneth Mort, Local Officer I, Department of Health and Social Security.
- Arthur Moseley, Chairman and Managing Director, Moseley (Holdings) Limited. For services to Export.
- Frederick Claude Mountier, Chairman, Voluntary Services Association, Redbridge.
- Hugh Sutherland Munro, Senior Executive Officer, Department of Health and Social Security.
- Miss Marian Gaye Murdoch, Director, British Invisible Exports Council.
- Alan Murphy, General Medical Practitioner; Lecturer in General Practice, University of Nottingham.
- Andrew Steel Murray. For services to the community in Creetown, Wigtownshire.
- Terence Patrick Nealon, Director, Caradon Curran Ltd., Cardiff.
- Mary, Mrs Neeson. For services to the National Deaf Children's Society, Scotland.
- John Edward Brian Newman, Japanese Programme Organiser, External Broadcasting, British Broadcasting Corporation.
- Margaret Mary, Mrs Newton, Executive Officer, Home Office.
- John Simpson Noble, General Medical Practitioner; Vice-Chairman, Family Practitioner Committee, Northumberland.
- B15 Gerald Patrick Noone, Principal Technical Development Officer, Severn Trent Water Authority.
- Gerald Nugent, lately Senior Executive Officer, Department for National Savings.
- Gerald O'Neill, General Manager, Plessey Telecommunications Limited, Ballynahinch, Co.
- Down.
- Miss Moira Helen Ord. For services to Netball.
- Michael Patrick O'Sullivan, Exploration Manager, Wytch Farm Development, British Petroleum Exploration.
- Glynn Meirion Owen, Chief Physicist, University Hospital of Wales, Cardiff.
- Robert Ivor Owen, Executive Officer, Ministry of Defence.
- John Francis Oxley, Senior Operating Department Assistant, Princess Alexandra Hospital, Harlow, Essex.
- Jane Ann, Mrs Packham, Casualty Sister, Erne Hospital, Enniskillen.
- Pamela Maurice, Mrs Parker, Secretary, Devon Branch, Council for the Protection of Rural England.
- Margaret Mary, Mrs Parr, Vice Chairman, Blackpool Wyre and Fylde Health Authority.
- Mary Diana, Mrs Pauline, Senior Primary Education Adviser, Mid Glamorgan Education Authority.
- Miss Gloria Sheena Pearson, Press Officer, Southern Region, British Railways.
- Eric Penson, Senior Professional and Technology Officer, Department of Transport.
- Desmond Charles Perris, Director, W. A. Perris and Sons Ltd.
- John Wharne Pickering, Chairman, Crawley Training Association.
- Michael Stanley Pike, Chief Superintendent, H.M. Inspectorate of Constabulary.
- Miss Danuta Stanislava Pniewska, lately Local Officer I, Department of Health and Social Security.
- Richard Edward Reuberson. For political service.
- Derek John Rice, Tax Officer, Higher Grade, Board of Inland Revenue.
- David Richards, Chief Superintendent, Metropolitan Police.
- Russell Richardson, Managing Director, Cross Gates Carriage Works, Optare Limited, Leeds.
- Roydon Bircham Richmond, Managing Director, H. R. Richmond Limited (Epsom Coaches).
- Miss Norah Kathleen Riddington, Member, Electricity Consumers' Council.
- Peter Sanderson Roberts, Director of Trading Standards, Leicestershire County Council.
- Miss Beryl Christine Robinson, District Nurse, Okehampton, Devon.
- Harold Edwin Robinson, lately President, National Society of Allotment and Leisure Gardens Limited.
- John Wilfred Roe, Director of Housing, Bolton Metropolitan Borough Council.
- Muriel Ellen, Mrs Rogers. For political and public service.
- Dennis Charles Roos, Manager, Hunterston 'A' Nuclear Power Station.
- Betty, Mrs Root, Director, Reading and Language Information Centre, University of Reading.
- Audrey Wilhelmina, Mrs Rose. For political service.
- Peter Lambert Russell, V.R.D., Business Counsellor, Small Business Division, Scottish Development Agency.
- Captain David Vivian Rusted, Senior Master, Marine Department, Shell UK Oil.
- Miss Lotte Sahlmann, Medical Officer, Sheiling Curative Schools, Camphill Trust Community.
- William Munce Saulters, Deputy Chief Vehicle Examiner, Department of the Environment, Northern Ireland.
- George Copeland Saunders, Law Correspondent, The Scotsman.
- Joan Henderson, Mrs Scott, Assistant, Chairman's Department; Organiser, Scotland, Welfare for the Disabled, Women's Royal Voluntary Service.
- Ronald Malcolm Scott, Managing Director, M.S.A. (Britain) Limited, Coatbridge.
- James Shaw, Inspector, Board of Inland Revenue.
- Malcolm John Shaw, lately Chief Superintendent, H.M. Inspectorate of Constabulary.
- Miss Vera Rosaline Shepherd, Chief Typing Manager, Health and Safety Executive.
- Gertrude (Trudie), Mrs Sheppard, Organiser, Newent Centre for Disabled and Gloucestershire Association for the Disabled.
- Maurice Lea Sherwin. For services to agriculture in Cheshire.
- Stanley Shorrock, Chairman, Shorrock plc.
- David Cyril Short. For political and public service.
- John Simmonite, Director, Moseley and District Churches Housing Association Limited.
- Thomas George Sinclair, Chief Superintendent, Royal Ulster Constabulary.
- Ajit Singh, lately Chairman, Kingston Group for Racial Understanding.
- William Skelton, Chairman, Merseyside Drugs Council.
- Charles McDowall Smith, Platoon Commander, Wigtownshire, Home Service Force.
- Mary Elizabeth, Mrs Smith. For services to handicapped children.
- Seymour James Louvain Southwood. For services to Boys' Clubs, Wales.
- John Henry Stagey, Security Officer, National Maritime Museum.
- Walter Stainrod, Regional Collector, Board of Inland Revenue.
- James Edward Stansfield, Higher Executive Officer, Board of Customs and Excise.
- John Arthur Charles Stevens, lately Senior Professional and Technology Officer, Ministry of Defence.
- Neville George Joseph Herbert Stiff. For political service.
- Eileen, Mrs Studdy, Volunteer Worker, Chelmsford, Citizens' Advice Bureau.
- James William Sutton, Purchasing Manager, Shotton Paper Company Limited.
- Marjorie, Mrs Swainston. For political and public service.
- Frank Leslie Sylvester, 'B' Clerk, Devon Army Cadet Force; Secretary, Exeter Branch, Coldstream Guards Association.
- Kenneth Ernest Tappenden, Chief Superintendent, Kent Constabulary.
- Ernest William Edward Taylor, Assistant Inspector, Fire Services Inspectorate.
- Nancy Barbara, Mrs Taylor, lately Document Interpreter, Cabinet Office.
- Peter Branston Taylor. For services to agriculture in Wales.
- James Roland Tew, Member, National Executive Committee, Motor Neurone Disease Association.
- Miss Adrienne Mary Laetitia Thirkell, Junior Administrator, British College of Optometrists.
- Reginald William Tudor Thorp. For services to the National Trust in the Fame Islands.
- William Timym, Sculptor.
- David Crabtree Tinniswood. For services to Industry and Education, North East Lancashire.
- Henry Fenwick Townsend, Higher Executive Officer, Department of Employment.
- Gordon Maurice Trevett, Chief Engineer, Greater Manchester Police.
- John Jeffery Turner, lately Company Secretary, Federation of Agricultural Co-operatives (UK) Limited.
- Anthony Michael Tynan, Curator, The Hancock Museum, Newcastle upon Tyne.
- Arnold Ullmann, Senior Professional and Technology Officer, Department of the Environment.
- Joyce Ceridwen, Mrs Urch, Senior Nurse, Brynhyryd Hospital, Forden, Welshpool, Powys.
- Bhanu Arjan Vadgama, Administration Officer, The Insolvency Service.
- Ian Alistair Ward Vance, Director, Navigation Systems, Radio and Microwave, Standard Telephones and Cables plc.
- Judith Anne, Mrs Verdon, Managing Director, ISA Controls Limited.
- Miss Drucilla Joy Vesty, Director, Royal Docks Area Team, London Dockyards Development Corporation.
- Arthur Roy Wadd, Senior Probation Officer, Nottinghamshire.
- John James Walkley. For services to Music in Gloucestershire and Worcestershire.
- Henry Watson, Senior Executive Officer, Manpower Services Commission.
- David Watt, Member, Chemistry, Pharmacy and Standards Sub Committee; Committee on Safety of Medicines and British Pharmacopoeia Committees.
- Thomas Fraser Watt. For services to the Chartered Institute of Transport, Scotland.
- Samuel Herbert Watterson. Director, S. H. Watterson (Engineering) Limited.
- Henry John Wellings, Annunciator Superintendent, House of Commons.
- Elizabeth Peternel, Mrs Wells, Curator and Director, Museum of Ancient Instruments, Royal College of Music.
- Donald Aldred Whitehead, Managing Director, VSW Scientific Instruments Limited. For services to Export.
- Miss Daphne June Whitmore, Deputy Headteacher, Hugh Christie Secondary School, Tonbridge, Kent.
- Jean Gertrude, Mrs Whitton, lately Headteacher, Mill Rythe First School, Hayling Island, Hampshire.
- Miss Eunice Freda Williams (Mrs Fuller), Nursing Sister, Gynaecology, Outpatients Department, Royal Free Hospital.
- Miss Heather Williams. For services to the community in Cumbria.
- Hugh Griffith Williams, Controller Operations, Western Counters Territory, Birmingham, The Post Office.
- Lyndon David Williams. For political and public service.
- Maurice Charles Williams, General Manager, Devon Industrial Services.
- Frederick Roy Willis, Vice-Chairman, Civilian Committee, Tiverton, Sea Cadet Corps Unit.
- Albert James Wood, Production Manager, Trebor plc.
- Marilynn Beryl, Mrs Wood, Enrolled Nurse, Ear, Nose and Throat Unit, Portsmouth and South East Hampshire Health Authority.
- Reginald James Wyatt, Senior Scientific Officer, British Geological Survey, Natural Environment Research Council.
- David Frank Young, Chairman, Continental Microwave (Holdings) plc. For services to Export.
- George Anwar Arida, Honorary British Consul, Tripoli, Lebanon.
- James Martin Birkbeck. For services to British commercial and community interests in Peru.
- Thomas MacLaren Blair, Chief Quantity Surveyor, Housing Department, Hong Kong.
- Margaret Genevieve, Mrs Borde, Clerk of the Legislative Council, British Virgin Islands.
- Gilbert Calleja. For services to the British community in Rio de Janeiro.
- Helene Patricia Mrs Caridis, lately British Consul, Corfu.
- David Osborne Clarke. For services to the British community in Aden.
- Maud Amara Mrs De Kerekrethy. For services to the British community in Rio de Janeiro.
- Joan Annie Enrica Mrs Diaz, Secretary, HM Embassy, Guatemala City.
- John Charles Edwards. For services to the British community in Salalah, Oman.
- Miss Marion Fang Sum-suk, J.P. For services to the disabled in Hong Kong.
- Angela Mrs Garcia Sainz. For services to the British community in Mexico City.
- Henry Maurice Gregson. For services to British tourists in France.
- Nigel Bathurst Hankin. For services to the British community in New Delhi.
- Olive Ethelma Mrs Hodge. For services to the community in Anguilla.
- Douglas Charles Hulme. For services to British commercial and community interests in Jedda.
- John Michael Jaques. For services to Anglo-Jordanian relations in Amman.
- Philippine Hare Mrs Lawson. For services to the British community in Paris.
- Louis Joseph Lombard. For services to the community in Gibraltar.
- Nathan Ma Ning-hei, J.P. For public and community services in Hong Kong.
- John Ellis Palfrey, English Language Adviser (British Council), Government of the Congo.
- Stephen Procter. For services to the British community in Jedda.
- Miss Jacqueline Bryony Lucy Pullinger. For welfare services to the community in Hong Kong.
- Peter David Sydney Radford, Commercial Assistant, HM Embassy, Paris.
- Donald Joseph Rains. For services to British commercial interests in Morocco.
- Paul Andrew Ramsay, lately Senior Visa Officer, British Interests Section, Tehran.
- Everet Ferdinand Romney. For services to the community in Anguilla.
- Diana Bryant, Mrs Rosenberg, lately Librarian, Juba University, Sudan.
- So Yan-kin, Student Adviser, Hong Kong Government Office, London.
- Robert Southern. For services to British tourism interests in Canada.
- David Paul Spencer, lately Second Secretary, HM Embassy, Aden.
- Dr Elizabeth Ruth Swain. For medical and welfare services to the community in Zambia.
- Nylon Leonard Tso, Q.P.M., C.P.M. For public services in Hong Kong.
- Frances Violet Mrs Walford. For services to the British community in Lisbon.
- Keith Wallis Warren. For services to the community in Mozambique.

=== Imperial Service Order (ISO) ===
- William Arthur Astill, Inspector (P), Board of Inland Revenue.
- Trevor David Badham, Audit Manager, National Audit Office.
- Thomas Royston Berry, Principal Scientific Officer, Ministry of Defence.
- Donald George Carter, Principal Professional and Technology Officer, Ministry of Defence.
- Cecil William Chadwick, Grade 7, Department of Health of Social Security.
- William Chappell, Chief Clerk, Newcastle Crown Court, Lord Chancellor's Department.
- Ralph George Busby Cox, T.D., Principal, Department of Health and Social Security.
- Anthony Robert Dobson, Principal, Ministry of Defence.
- Alistair Greig Dodds, Principal, Department of Employment.
- James Ewing, Principal Professional and Technology Officer, Ministry of Defence.
- Joseph Charles Anthony Hammond, Commissioner for Labour, Hong Kong.
- Geoffrey Ward Harrison, Principal Collector, Board of Inland Revenue.
- Miss Jean Corisande Howliston, Principal, Department of the Environment.
- Gerald Lionel Johnston, Principal Professional and Technical Officer, Department of the Environment, Northern Ireland.
- Bernard Lyons, Official Receiver (B), The Insolvency Service.
- Arthur Inman Procter, Inspector (SP), Board of Inland Revenue.
- Arthur Wilson Scruton, Foreign and Commonwealth Office.
- Ernest Harold Matthew Seaward, Grade 7, Manpower Services Commission.
- Harry Simpson, Inspector (P), Board of Inland Revenue.
- Roy Smith, Senior Principal, Board of Customs and Excise.
- Reginald Bryce Snow, Principal, Home Office.
- Robert Kirby West, Principal Accountant, Scottish Office.
- John Winfield, J.P., Senior Assistant Director of Education, Hong Kong.
- Rita Gwendoline, Mrs Woodley, Grade 7, Ministry of Agriculture, Fisheries and Food.

=== British Empire Medal (BEM) ===
Military Division

- Charge Chief Marine Engineering Artificer (P) Ian Aldred.
- Chief Petty Officer (Mine Warfare) Lee John Barnett.
- Chief Petty Officer Steward David Deady.
- Chief Radio Supervisor Colin Edward Drewett.
- Chief Petty Officer Writer Graeme Ross Kilday Fernie.
- Band Colour Sergeant Alan Reginald Flook, Royal Marines.
- Chief Petty Officer Air Engineering Artificer (R) James Brodie Holmes.
- Chief Petty Officer Marine Engineering Artificer Kenneth Peter House.
- Chief Petty Officer (Acting Local Charge Chief) Air Engineering Artificer (WL) David Edward Knott.
- Charge Chief Marine Engineering Artificer (P) Brian Richard Lingham.
- Charge Chief Communications Technician John Brian McCormick.
- Sergeant (Local Colour Sergeant) Alexander Henry Geddes McLeod, Royal Marines.
- Chief Petty Officer (Operations) (Missile) Robert Thomas Norman.
- Charge Chief Marine Engineering Artificer (P) Charles William Oliver.
- Acting Chief Petty Officer (Operations) (Missile) Robert Thomas John Searle.
- Chief Petty Officer Stores Accountant Brian Smith.
- Chief Petty Officer Weapon Engineering Artificer Nigel Snape, D101124A.
- Chief Petty Officer Stores Accountant Richard Charles Whale.
- Colour Sergeant Andrew Frederick Wrey, Royal Marines.
- Charge Chief Air Engineering Artificer (M) Eric Francis Young.
- Staff Sergeant David Neil Alcroft, The Royal Highland Fusiliers (Princess Margaret's Own Glasgow and Ayrshire Regiment).
- Sergeant Susan Anne Alderson, Women's Royal Army Corps.
- Staff Sergeant Kingsley Charles Augustus, Corps of Royal Engineers.
- Staff Sergeant Keith Bath, Army Air Corps.
- Staff Sergeant Richard Langrish Bird, Corps of Royal Electrical and Mechanical Engineers.
- Staff Sergeant Bernard Trevor Birley, Corps of Royal Electrical and Mechanical Engineers.
- Lance Sergeant Henry Bond, Welsh Guards.
- Staff Sergeant John Anthony Bradburn, The Queen's Own Mercian Yeomanry, Territorial Army.
- Sergeant Fredrick Victor Broadhurst, Corps of Royal Electrical and Mechanical Engineers.
- Sergeant Walter Browne, 5th Royal Inniskilling Dragoon Guards.
- Staff Sergeant Phillip Frederick Butler, Welsh Guards.
- Corporal Derek Carman, Royal Corps of Signals.
- Staff Sergeant Ronald Michael Carter, Grenadier Guards.
- Staff Sergeant Thomas Gerard Cassidy, Corps of Royal Electrical and Mechanical Engineers.
- Staff Sergeant Graham John Chambers, Royal Army Ordnance Corps.
- Staff Sergeant Royston Charles, Army Physical Training Corps.
- Staff Sergeant John Henry Clorley, Royal Army Ordnance Corps.
- Sergeant Christopher Dennis Coady, Royal Regiment of Artillery, Territorial Army.
- Corporal Michael David Courtnage, The Queen's Regiment, Territorial Army.
- Sergeant Eric Blair Craig, The 4th (Volunteer) Battalion Royal Irish Rangers (27 (Inniskilling) 83rd and 87th (The North Irish Militia)), Territorial Army.
- Corporal Allan Morris Crickmore, Corps of Royal Military Police.
- Staff Sergeant Christopher Alan Cunningham, Corps of Royal Engineers.
- Staff Sergeant Michael William Daniels, Corps of Royal Electrical and Mechanical Engineers.
- Staff Sergeant Peter Joseph Davis, Army Physical Training Corps.
- Staff Sergeant Richard John Dorey, Corps of Royal Engineers.
- Corporal Richard John Downes, Corps of Royal Military Police.
- Staff Sergeant John William Downie, The Light Infantry.
- Sergeant Edward Nugent Duffy, Royal Army Ordnance Corps.
- Staff Sergeant Philip Oral Eccles, Army Physical Training Corps.
- Corporal Paul Emerson, Royal Corps of Signals.
- Staff Sergeant Terence Finlay, The Cheshire Regiment.
- Sergeant Anthony Ethelbert Franklin, Royal Army Ordnance Corps.
- Staff Sergeant Ian Friend, Royal Army Pay Corps, Territorial Army.
- Staff Sergeant David Michael Gaffney, Royal Corps of Signals.
- Staff Sergeant Keith Douglas Godbeer, The King's Regiment.
- Sergeant Hukumbahadur Thapa, 7th Duke of Edinburgh's Own Gurkha Rifles.
- Staff Sergeant Honor June Jaeger, Women's Royal Army Corps.
- Staff Sergeant Raymond Jasper, The Royal Welch Fusiliers.
- Staff Sergeant Donald Key, Royal Regiment of Artillery.
- Staff Sergeant Philip King, Army Physical Training Corps.
- Sergeant Martin John Leaper, Royal Tank Regiment.
- Sergeant Robert Brynmor Lewis, The Parachute Regiment.
- Sergeant Michael Mason, The King's Own Royal Border Regiment.
- Sergeant David Andrew McCurdy, Corps of Royal Engineers.
- Corporal Douglas Collins Murray, Royal Corps of Transport.
- Staff Sergeant John Henry Albert Needham, The Royal Green Jackets.
- Staff Sergeant Maureen Malone O'Donnell, Intelligence Corps, Territorial Army.
- Staff Sergeant Bromley Paul O'Hare, The Parachute Regiment.
- Sergeant Christopher Malcolm Pascoe, Corps of Royal Engineers.
- Staff Sergeant Keith Pendleton, Royal Army Ordnance Corps.
- Sergeant Linda Karen Richards, Women's Royal Army Corps.
- Corporal Alexander Robertson, The Black Watch (Royal Highland Regiment).
- Lance Corporal Robert Denzil Robinson, Royal Army Ordnance Corps.
- Sergeant John Ronald Rogers, Royal Army Pay Corps, Territorial Army.
- Corporal James Edwin Sansom, Army Catering Corps, Territorial Army.
- Staff Sergeant John Sharkey, Royal Corps of Signals.
- Corporal Robert Barrie Sinclair, Army Catering Corps.
- Staff Sergeant Paul Arthur Sweatman, The Queen's Regiment, Territorial Army.
- Sergeant William Fred Taylor, The Light Infantry, Territorial Army.
- Sergeant Arthur Duncan Thomson, Royal Army Ordnance Corps.
- Sergeant Kevin Michael Tobin, Intelligence Corps.
- Staff Sergeant Terence David Walker, Royal Corps of Signals.
- Staff Sergeant John William Ward, The Green Howards (Alexandra, Princess of Wales's Own Yorkshire Regiment).
- Staff Sergeant Stephen Ward, Army Physical Training Corps.
- Sergeant Anthony Edward Wilson, Army Catering Corps, Territorial Army.
- Lance Bombardier Ronald Wynn, Royal Regiment of Artillery.
- Flight Sergeant Denis Ronald Allen, Royal Air Force Regiment.
- Sergeant Reginald Allsopp, Royal Air Force.
- Flight Sergeant Alan Barnett, Royal Air Force.
- Flight Sergeant Clive Leslie Bruton, Royal Air Force Regiment.
- Flight Sergeant Peter Curzon, Royal Air Force.
- Sergeant Alan Victor Durrant, Royal Air Force.
- Sergeant George Gerald Edwards, Royal Air Force.
- Flight Sergeant Martin Eversfield, Royal Air Force.
- Flight Sergeant Norman Gray, Royal Air Force.
- Chief Technician Peter Stanley Gregson, Royal Air Force.
- Flight Sergeant Thomas Robert Grey, Royal Air Force.
- Corporal Kenneth William Hall, Royal Air Force.
- Chief Technician John Charles Hearse, Royal Air Force.
- Flight Sergeant Eric Stephen Helsdon, Royal Air Force.
- Flight Sergeant Thomas Allan Johnston, Royal Air Force.
- Sergeant Michael John King, Royal Air Force.
- Flight Sergeant Alfred Thompson McKay, Royal Air Force.
- Sergeant Stephen Charles Nicholson, Royal Air Force.
- Flight Sergeant Patrick Joseph O'Neill, Royal Air Force.
- Flight Sergeant Stephen Charles Patey, Royal Air Force.
- Flight Sergeant Peter Alan Snitch, Royal Air Force.
- Flight Sergeant David Tappin, Royal Air Force.
- Flight Sergeant Peter Owen Stephen Tucker, Royal Air Force.
- Chief Technician Robert Anthony Young, Royal Air Force.

Civil Division
United Kingdom

- Colin William Anderson, Constable, Metropolitan Police.
- Peter Blair Anderson, Constable, Northern Constabulary.
- William Low Anderson, Senior Inspector, Military Knitware, Remploy Limited.
- Kenneth Frederick Bywater Astle, Toolmaker, Nottingham, Royal Ordnance plc.
- Norman Atkins, Chief Naval Auxiliaryman, Royal Naval Auxiliary Service.
- Peggy Rose, Mrs Bartholomew, Foster Parent, East Sussex County Council.
- Barbara, Mrs Beards, Member, Truro, Women's Royal Voluntary Service.
- William Moffat Beattie, Frameworker, Hogg of Hawick.
- Edith Ann Clark, Mrs Bell, Caretaker, Territorial Army Centre, 39 Signal Regiment (V), Dundee.
- Leonard Walter Betts, Component Engineering Supervisor, Marconi Space Systems Limited.
- Frederick John Billing, Convenor, Amalgamated Engineering Union, GEC Large Machines Limited.
- James McAleece Binnie, Postal Executive 'D', Royal Mail Letters, Edinburgh, The Post Office.
- Alec Walter Bishop, Roadman, West Sussex County Council.
- William Blair Black, Loading and Size Supervisor, Wm. Sommerville and Son plc, Penicuik.
- Dorothy Lucy, Mrs Bolton, Leader, Cheadle Animal Welfare Society and for services to the community.
- Norman Boulton, Sub Officer, Mid-Glamorgan Fire Service.
- Gerard Micheal Bowker, Engineering Powerplants and Components Superintendent, British Midland Airways.
- William Robert Bowman, lately Commandant, Clydebank Detachment, British Red Cross Society.
- Ronald George Weston Brewer, Workshops Manager, Space and Communications Division, British Aerospace plc.
- James Harvey Broomhead, lately Constable, H.M. Inspectorate of Constabulary.
- Elizabeth, Mrs Brown, Foster Parent, Bolton County Council.
- John Richard Bryant, Training Supervisor, Knotterbridge Training Centre for Roadmen, Devon County Council.
- William Henry Bullock, Shunter, Ministry of Defence.
- John Albert Bulpit, Constable, Greater Manchester Police.
- John Richard Byard, "Specials" Foreman, Butterley Brick Ltd. For services to Export.
- Miss Winifred Ora Carse, Transport Organiser, Northumberland and Tyneside, Women's Royal Voluntary Service.
- Miss Dorothy Myrtle Chant. For services to the Blood Transfusion Service in Southport.
- Barry Clarke, Station Officer, Dorset Fire Brigade.
- Ewart Edward Clarke. For services to the blind in Redditch.
- Ernest Clyde, Sub-Officer, Fire Authority for Northern Ireland.
- Norman Walter Cobb, Chief Steward I, Ministry of Defence.
- Peter Daniel Codd, Leading Street Sweeper, Westminster City Council.
- David Henry Grahame Coles, Construction Manager, Balfour Beatty Power Construction Limited.
- Leonard Eugene Colwell, Professional and Technology Officer, Ministry of Defence.
- Lawrence Frederick Cooke, Auxiliary Coastguard, Reporting Section, Pett Level, Sussex.
- Reginald James Cooper. For services to the community in Langbank, Renfrewshire.
- Albert George Cox. For services to Bowls in Kent.
- Alec Lionel Cross, Foreman (Ganger), Anglian Water.
- Audrey Alice, Mrs Crust, Telephonist, 10 Downing Street.
- Patrick Curry, Head Porter, Erne Hospital, Enniskillen.
- James Victor Harris Davidson, Glassblower, Wear Glass Works, Corning Limited.
- Miss Eileen Winifred Davies, lately Plant Assistant, Oswestry Water Treatment Plant, North West Water Authority.
- Leonard Frank Davies, Assistant Technician, Stores, London Midland Region, British Railways.
- Oswald Davies, Cadet Superintendent, Bro Ddyfi Division, St John Ambulance Brigade.
- Susan Florence, Mrs Dawson, Psychiatric Unit Representative for the League of Friends, Sutton Hospital, Surrey.
- James Denman, Wire Mill Superintendent, Briden Limited.
- Hilda, Mrs Dixon, School Crossing Patrol, Salford District Council.
- James McGonnell Dobson, Works Manager, A. Monk and Company plc.
- William Ronald Dockerill, Messenger, Home Office.
- Charles Bernard Dodwell, Senior Usher, North Devon Magistrates' Court.
- Robert Marshall Duncan, Service Engineer, Scotland, British Gas plc.
- Francis Edward, Head Carver, The Savoy Hotel, London WC2.
- Dorothy, Mrs Edwards, Supplies Officer, Clwyd Branch, The British Red Cross Society.
- Clifford Joseph Ellis. For services to the fishing industry in the North East.
- Sidney Ellis. For services to the League of Friends, Morriston Hospital, Swansea.
- Cyril Charles Evans, Graphics Officer, Ministry of Defence.
- Leslie Evans, Constable, South Wales Constabulary.
- Rita, Mrs Everett, Office Keeper IA, Department of Health and Social Security.
- Gordon David Farmer, Sub Officer, East Sussex Fire Brigade.
- James Eric Forrest. For services to youth in Todmorden, West Yorkshire.
- John Harrison Foster, Sub Postmaster, Westgate TSO, Grantham, Corby Counters District, The Post Office.
- Leslie William John Frost, Secretary, RAF Regiment, South East Asia Command Association.
- Philip Garner, lately International Exchange Consultant, Bath City Council.
- Henry Charles Geere, Supervising Instructional Officer 1, Ministry of Defence.
- Albert Kenneth George, lately Process and General Supervisory C, Ministry of Defence.
- John Philip Gerrish, General Foreman, Southern Electricity Board.
- John Gibbons, Section Inspector, Liverpool Section, British Waterways Board.
- William Robert Gilbert, lately Prison Officer, Northern Ireland Prison Service.
- Eleanor May, Mrs Gilks, lately Home Help, Warwickshire County Council.
- Arthur Henry Goddard, Professional and Technology Officer, Ministry of Defence.
- Andrew Gage Graham, Plant Operator, Department of Agriculture, Northern Ireland.
- Kenneth William Grantham, Engineer, Inspection Department, Marconi Space Systems Limited.
- Mary, Mrs Graves. For services to the Patients' Library Organisation, Maidstone Hospital, Kent.
- Lawrence Gray, Joiner, Swan Hunter Limited.
- Alan Green, Railman, Eastern Region, British Railways.
- Glyn Haines, Craftsman Overhead Lines, South Eastern Electricity Board.
- John Duckworth Hall, Civilian Instructor, No. 341 (Preston) Squadron, Air Training Corps.
- Robert Hugh Hamill, Electrician, BP Chemicals Limited.
- Marjorie Elsie, Mrs Hammond, lately Foster Parent, Suffolk.
- Francis Bernard Hand, District Superintendent, Permanent Way Division, Civil Engineering Department, London Underground Limited.
- Dorothy Joyce, Mrs Harris. For services to the community in Welwyn Garden City, Hertfordshire.
- John Hart, Section Officer, Durham Special Constabulary.
- Sidney George Hawkins, Warden, Grand Western Canal, Devon County Council.
- Norman Frederick Hide, Foreign and Commonwealth Office.
- Florence Beatty, Mrs Higgins, lately Foster Parent, Folkestone.
- Norman Edwin Hobbs, Shipwright, Ministry of Defence.
- John Hodgson, Traffic Checker, International Paint.
- Annalena, Mrs Hogg. For services to the Women's Royal Voluntary Service in Roxburghshire.
- Ronald Walter Hoile. For services to the League of Friends, Chadwell Heath Hospital, Essex.
- Edmund Houghton. For services to the community in Hayfield, Derbyshire.
- Averil Suzanne, Mrs Howell, Member, Saxmundham, Suffolk, Women's Royal Voluntary Service.
- John Thomas Hughes, Observer, Llanrhaeadr Post, No. 17 Group, Royal Observer Corps.
- John William Hughes, Governor Grade V, H.M. Prison Bedford.
- William Hughes, Steel Worker, Pallion Shipyard, North East Shipbuilders Limited.
- Eric Herbert Hyde, Foreman, Merthyr Tydfil Institute for the blind.
- John Charles Jack, lately Staff Instructor, Loretto School, Edinburgh, Combined Cadet Force.
- Peter William Jarvis, Station Officer, Norfolk Fire Service.
- Thomas Chapman Jenkinson. For services to the fishing industry at Filey.
- Frederick John Thomas Jones, Leading Ambulanceman, Gwynedd Health Authority.
- Henry William Judd, District Service Officer, Southern, British Gas plc.
- Mary Butler, Mrs Meade-King. For services to the Phobic Club in Plymouth.
- William Henry Richard King, County Treasurer, Lincolnshire, The Royal British Legion.
- John Larkin, Technical Officer, Northern Ireland Housing Executive.
- Thomas Laurie, Professional and Technical Officer, National Engineering Laboratory, Department of Trade and Industry.
- Brian Ronald Lee, Detective Constable, Sussex Police.
- Norman Lee, Technical Officer, Lancashire and Cumbria District, British Telecommunications plc.
- Frank Leicester, lately Colliery Overman, Bickershaw Complex, Western Area, British Coal Corporation.
- Brian Joseph Le Mar, lately Clerk of Works, Canterbury Cathedral.
- Ralph Stanley Linham, Chairman, Glastonbury Club, The Royal British Legion.
- William Laurence Litherland, Caretaker, Range High School, Sefton Local Education Authority.
- Kathleen Margaret, Mrs Little, Nursing Auxiliary, Accident and Emergency Department, Harringey Health Authority.
- Myra, Mrs Lloyd, Transport Organiser, South West England, Women's Royal Voluntary Service.
- George Fraser Low, Mashman, Glenfiddich Distillery, William Grant and Sons Limited.
- Marjorie Frances, Mrs, Lyall, Chairwoman, Thrift Shop, Rheindahlen Garrison.
- Susan Williamson, Mrs McArthur. For services to Music.
- Beatrice Margaret, Mrs Macey, Administrative Assistant (Transportation), County Surveyors Department, Avon County Council.
- Robert McGowan, General Packer, Remploy Aintree Factory.
- Francis Patrick McHugh, lately Prison Officer, Northern Ireland Prison Service.
- Thomas Henry McIvor, Store-keeper and Clerk, Eastern Health and Social Services Board.
- Evan Fraser Mackenzie, Sub Postmaster, Burghead, Morayshire, The Post Office.
- John McMullan, Stores Officer D, Ministry of Defence.
- Reginald William Magee, Security Foreman, Northern Ireland Electricity.
- Hilda Helen, Mrs Maidment, Chairman, The Brook General Hospital Body Scanner Appeal.
- Frederick William Mann, Master Weaver, Edinburgh Tapestry Company Limited.
- Arnot Manson, Fire Protection and Safety Officer, Clyde Port Authority.
- Francis Margrave, Mobility Officer for Blind People, Essex County Council.
- Tom Marsden, lately Driver, East Yorkshire Motor Services Limited.
- Betty Margaret, Mrs Marsh, Auxiliary Nurse, Dudley Road Hospital, West Birmingham Health Authority.
- Peter Miller Martin, Sub-Divisional Officer, South Yorkshire Special Constabulary.
- Eric Henry Masters, Senior Ranger, Forestry Commission.
- John Lindsay Mathewson, Constable, Humberside Police.
- Richard John Vaudin Mauger, Sub Officer, Guernsey States Fire Brigade.
- Alfred Mawhinney, lately Chief Electronic Technician, Royal Victoria Hospital, Belfast.
- William Maxwell, Convenor, General, Municipal, Boilermakers and Allied Trades Union, Sellafield Site, British Nuclear Fuels Limited.
- Gordon David Mayhew, Senior Administrative Assistant, Suffolk Constabulary.
- Miss Irene Maykels, Driver, Government Car Service, Department of the Environment.
- Miss Patricia Amy Minchinton, Cartographic Draughtsman, Ordnance Survey.
- Malcolm Morley, Sergeant, Greater Manchester Police.
- George Gordon Wyllie Morrison, Reserve Constable, Royal Ulster Constabulary.
- Henry Morrison, Senior Supervisor, Harland and Wolff plc.
- James Andrew Morrison, Sergeant, Royal Ulster Constabulary.
- James Auld Morrison, Craft Supervisor, Department of the Environment, Northern Ireland.
- Ernest William Munro, Governor Grade V, H.M. Prison Noranside.
- Gwen, Mrs Murdin. For services to the community in Higham Ferrers, Northamptonshire.
- John Forbes Murray, Supervising Bailiff I, Middlesbrough Group of Courts.
- James George Neish, Station Officer, H.M. Coastguard, Department of Transport.
- Harold Nelson. For services to Cycling.
- Robert Watson Opray, Constable, Metropolitan Police.
- Edward Cyril Orr, Constable, Royal Ulster Constabulary.
- David Henry Parmee, Chief Observer, Woodvale Post, No. 21 Group, Royal Observer Corps.
- Henry Swan Paterson, Safety and Training Officer, Barony Colliery, Scottish Area, British Coal Corporation.
- Leonard Charles Patten, lately Coxswain, Newhaven Lifeboat, Royal National Lifeboat Institution.
- Keith Charles Pentlow, Stores Supervisor, Unilever Research, Colworth Laboratory.
- John Walter Pilbeam, Sergeant, Warwickshire Constabulary.
- Ivor Derek Quickenden, Craftsman, Ministry of Defence.
- Anthony Michael John Quinn, Process and General Supervisor, Ministry of Agriculture, Fisheries and Food.
- Joseph Rannachan, Senior Foreman, Outside Labour Force, A and W Fullarton Limited, Glasgow.
- Sydney Norman John Rapson, Air Frame Engine Fitter, Ministry of Defence.
- Arthur Ravenhill, Governor Grade IV, H.M. Prison Gartree.
- Geoffrey William Reeks. For services to Cricket in Bedfordshire.
- Rose Taylor, Mrs Reid. For services to the League of Friends, Peterhead Cottage Hospital.
- Mary Katherine, Mrs Rice. For services to the community in Newcastle, Co. Down.
- Anthony Ernest Riches, Stores Supervisory Officer Grade C, Metropolitan Police.
- Donald Ross Riddell, Leader, Highland Strathspey and Reel Society.
- Margaret Elizabeth, Mrs Robinson. For services to the Lincolnshire Agricultural Society.
- Peter Kenneth James Robinson, Chief Observer, Farnsfield Post, No. 8 Group, Coventry, Royal Observer Corps.
- Watson Ruthven, Chargehand Painter, Scottish Development Department.
- Eleanor, Mrs Sankey. For services to the League of Friends, Winwick Hospital, Cheshire.
- Miss Ellen Crake Scott, Linen Room Supervisor, Cherry Knowle Hospital, Sunderland Health Authority.
- Shao Chun Kar, Laundry Contractor, H.M.S. Ark Royal.
- William Sinclair, Treasurer, Wick Harbour Trust.
- Alan George Smith, Milkman, Express Dairies.
- David Edward Smith, Fitter, George Wimpey plc.
- George Frederic Smith, Driver and Clerk, Gloucester County Libraries.
- John Frederick Raymond Smith, Constable, Staffordshire Police.
- Edward Stafford, Assistant Works Superintendent, City of Newcastle upon Tyne.
- Bridget O'Niel, Mrs Stenhouse, Quality Control Supervisor, Patons and Baldwins Limited, Alloa.
- Frederick Hall Stewart, lately Professional and Technology Officer, Ministry of Defence.
- Samuel Stitt, Site Engineer, Lambeg Industrial Research Association.
- Christopher Strain, lately Process and General Supervisory D, Ministry of Defence.
- Janet Louise, Mrs Stucke, Organiser, Greenwich District Hospital Shop, Women's Royal Voluntary Service.
- Beatrice Sarah, Mrs Sturgess, Honorary Firewoman (Cleaner), Cambridgeshire Fire Service.
- Edwin Swaine, Instructor, Wakefield, Sea Cadet Corps Unit.
- Esther Martin, Mrs Taylor, Chef, British Broadcasting Corporation, Belfast.
- Geoffrey William Taylor, Professional and Technology Officer, Commonwealth War Graves Commission.
- Gordon Thain, Marine Service Officer III, Ministry of Defence.
- Frank Herbert Thistleton, Driver, Eastern Region, British Railways.
- Royston Noel Thomas, Production Manager, Alfred Reader and Company Limited.
- Ronald Thompson, Senior Dock Foreman, Immingham Dock, Associated British Ports.
- Peggy, Mrs, Timms, Deputy County Organiser, Warwickshire, Women's Royal Voluntary Service.
- Doreen, Mrs Tulip, First Aid and Nursing Group Leader, Durham County Branch, The British Red Cross Society.
- George Reginald Turbutt, Glass Planning and Estimating Engineer, Pilkington plc.
- John Bryan Tuthill, Superintendent, Anglian Water Authority.
- Alfred Henry Underwood, Caretaker, Raglan Barracks, Newport, Territorial Auxiliary and Volunteer Reserve Association.
- Henry Valentine, Civilian Instructional Officer Grade III, H.M. Prison Bristol.
- Sidney Vaughan. For services to the community in Ormesby, Cleveland.
- Edward John Viney, Seaman, Pilot Launch Crew, Isle of Wight Pilot Vessel Service.
- Miss Jemima Mearns Walker, lately Administrator, Denburn Health Centre, Aberdeen.
- John Walker, Driver, London Midland Region, British Railways.
- Basil Warne, lately Works Supervisor, Surrey County Council.
- Charles Hubert Webb, Professional and Technology Officer, Ministry of Defence.
- Frederick John Weir, Courtkeeper, Omagh Courthouse, Co. Tyrone.
- Roy James Wells, Observer, Cranbrook Post, No. 1 Group, Royal Observer Corps.
- Anthony West, Installation Manager (Northern) Engineering and General Equipment Ltd.
- Joan, Mrs Westland, Supervisor of Government Telephonists, Department of the Environment.
- Eric Bruce White, Instructor, Operative Training Centre, George Wimpey plc.
- Margaret, Mrs White, lately Commandant, Stanley Company (Glasgow), St Andrew's Ambulance Corps.
- Alexander Whyte, Sub-Officer, Highlands and Islands Fire Brigade.
- Donald Alexander Wilson, Freight Supervisor, Scottish Region, British Railways.
- Lawrence Arthur Wilson, lately Site Agent, William Sindall plc.
- Miss Mary Anna Chapman Wilson. For services to agriculture in County Fermanagh.
- William Wood, Electrician, Vickers Shipbuilding and Engineering Limited.
- Albert Edward Wright, Foreign and Commonwealth Office.
- Fredrick Baden Horace Wright, Electrical Fitter, Eastern Electricity Board.
- Alexander Young, lately Chief Clerk Officer, H.M. Prison Inverness.
- Allan McNasser Young, Professional and Technology Officer, Department of the Environment.
- Thomas David Young, Governor Grade IV, H.M. Prison Camp Hill.

Overseas Territories

- Chung Wun-ching, Butcher Class I, Urban Services Department, Hong Kong.
- James Collins. For services to Agriculture in Montserrat.
- George Gaskin, Third Officer, Fire Service, Gibraltar.
- Miss Lydia Henrich, Executive Officer, Housing Department, Gibraltar.
- Kan Kong-Lam, Chief Customs Officer, Customs and Excise Service, Hong Kong.
- Kwok Bing-chau, Senior Clerical Officer, Buildings and Lands Department, Hong Kong.
- Lam Shun-pung, Transport Supervisor, Government Land Transport Agency, Hong Kong.
- Victoria, Mrs Lombard, Headteacher, St Mary's First School, Gibraltar.
- James Thompson, Senior Motor Vehicle Examiner, Police Department, Hong Kong.
- Tsoi Kwing-hi, Senior Clerical Officer, Medical and Health Department, Hong Kong.
- Sau-ha Cheung, Mrs Tsoi, Staff Midwife, Medical and Health Department, Hong Kong.
- Wong Kai-chiu, lately Senior Foreman, Urban Services Department, Hong Kong.

=== Royal Red Cross ===
==== Member of the Royal Red Cross (RRC) ====
- Lieutenant Colonel Elizabeth Jane Campbell, Queen Alexandra's Royal Army Nursing Corps, Territorial Army.
- Lieutenant Colonel Sylvia Scott, Queen Alexandra's Royal Army Nursing Corps.
- Group Captain Elizabeth Angela Innes Sandison, A.R.R.C., Princess Mary's Royal Air Force Nursing Service.

==== Associate of the Royal Red Cross (ARRC) ====
- Superintending Nursing Officer Judith Claire Brown, Queen Alexandra's Royal Naval Nursing Service.
- Major Susan Elizabeth Daly, Queen Alexandra's Royal Army Nursing Corps.
- Lieutenant Colonel Dorothy Golding, T.D., Queen Alexandra's Royal Army Nursing Corps, Territorial Army.
- Major Ann Kerr, Queen Alexandra's Royal Army Nursing Corps.
- Major Joyce Wideman, Queen Alexandra's Royal Army Nursing Corps.
- Squadron Leader Anthony Charles Wesley Cox, Princess Mary's Royal Air Force Nursing Service.
- Squadron Leader Janet Edmunds-Jones, Princess Mary's Royal Air Force Nursing Service.

=== Air Force Cross (AFC) ===
- Lieutenant Commander Phillip Anthony Robertson Harrall, Royal Navy.
- Lieutenant Commander Nigel Geoffrey Hennell, Royal Navy.
- Squadron Leader Russell George Braithwaite, Royal Air Force.
- Wing Commander Jeremy Andrew King, Royal Air Force.
- Squadron Leader Martin Buckwell Stoner, Royal Air Force.
- Wing Commander Denys Andrew Williams, Royal Air Force.

=== Queen's Police Medal for Distinguished Service (QPM) ===
England and Wales

- Philip Henry Corbett, Commander, Metropolitan Police.
- Lance Cornish, Detective Superintendent, Port of London Authority Police.
- Bernard Drew, Assistant Chief Constable, West Mercia Constabulary.
- Jefferson Edward Easton, Chief Superintendent, Greater Manchester Police.
- Walter Raymond Girven, Deputy Chief Constable, Dorset Police.
- Peter Hayes, Deputy Chief Constable, South Yorkshire Police.
- Michael Hornby, Detective Sergeant, West Midlands Police.
- Robert William Jackson, Superintendent, Nottinghamshire Constabulary.
- Gordon Reginald Lloyd, Commander, Metropolitan Police.
- Gordon McMurchie, Assistant Chief Constable, Northumbria Police.
- Frank Herbert Morritt, Assistant Chief Constable, North Yorkshire Police.
- David Joseph O'Dowd, Chief Constable, Northamptonshire Police.
- Brian John Phillips, Assistant Chief Constable, Devon and Cornwall Constabulary.
- David John Polkinghorne, lately Commander, Metropolitan Police.
- John Peter Robinson, Commander, Metropolitan Police.
- William Derick Spalton, Inspector, Lincolnshire Police.
- Beston Wakely, Chief Superintendent, Wiltshire Constabulary.
- Neville Yarwood, lately Detective Sergeant, Merseyside Police.

Northern Ireland

- Sir John Hermon, O.B.E., Chief Constable, Royal Ulster Constabulary.
- John Niall Howe, Superintendent, Royal Ulster Constabulary.

Hong Kong

- Gordon Jack, C.P.M., Assistant Commissioner of Police, Hong Kong.
- So Lai-yin, C.P.M., Assistant Commissioner of Police, Hong Kong.

Scotland

- Robert Carter Cunningham, Assistant Chief Constable, Strathclyde Police.
- Donald Kerr Millar, Chief Superintendent, Lothian and Borders Police.

=== Queen's Fire Service Medal for Distinguished Service ===
England and Wales

- Frank Booth, Assistant Chief Officer, Army Fire Service.
- William Wilson Dunlop, Deputy Chief Officer, Tyne and Wear Fire Brigade.
- James Gurney, Deputy Assistant Chief Officer, London Fire Brigade.
- Frank Nicholson Higgins, Deputy Chief Officer, Bedfordshire Fire Service.
- Alan McAndrew, Divisional Officer Ii, Suffolk Fire Service.
- Francis George Wilton, Chief Officer, Avon Fire Service.
- Henry Edward Wright, Chief Officer, South Yorkshire County Fire Service.

Hong Kong

- Lam Chek-yuen, C.P.M., Chief Fire Officer, Hong Kong.

Scotland

- Clive Benson Halliday, Firemaster, Strathclyde Fire Brigade.

=== Colonial Police Medal for Meritorious Service (CPM) ===
- Colin Malcolm Baker, Superintendent, Royal Hong Kong Police Force.
- Thomas Albert Barnes, Senior Superintendent, Royal Hong Kong Police Force.
- Chan Siu-chik, Chief Inspector, Royal Hong Kong Police Force.
- Cheung Chi-keung, Senior Superintendent, Royal Hong Kong Police Force.
- Cheung King-tim, Station Sergeant, Royal Hong Kong Police Force.
- Ho Hon-kwan, Principal Fireman, Hong Kong Fire Services.
- James Ho Kwok-chuen, Senior Divisional Officer, Hong Kong Fire Services.
- Iu Yee-hung, Superintendent, Royal Hong Kong Police Force.
- Kwok Ping-tong, Station Sergeant, Royal Hong Kong Police Force.
- Lai Wun-wing, Chief Inspector, Royal Hong Kong Police Force.
- Lau Chun-sang, Station Sergeant, Royal Hong Kong Police Force.
- Lee Wai, Principal Fireman, Hong Kong Fire Services.
- Li Kam-chuen, Station Sergeant, Royal Hong Kong Police Force.
- Peter Maginnis, Superintendent, Gibraltar Police Force.
- Mak Kwok-kuen, Chief Inspector, Royal Hong Kong Police Force.
- Pun Ying-kuen, Sergeant, Royal Hong Kong Police Force.
- Robert Charles Toal, Senior Superintendent, Royal Hong Kong Police Force.
- Yip Kwok-keung, Senior Superintendent, Royal Hong Kong Police Force.

=== Queen's Commendation for Valuable Service in the Air ===
- Squadron Leader Thomas Leonard Boyle, Royal Air Force.
- Squadron Leader William George Coupar, Royal Air Force.
- Squadron Leader Denis Edwin Herrett, Royal Air Force.
- Flight Lieutenant Malcolm John Andrew Macdonald, Royal Air Force.
- Squadron Leader Nigel David Alan Maddox, Royal Air Force.
- Flight Lieutenant Ian George Leslie Malin, Royal Air Force.
- Squadron Leader Ian Mortimer, Royal Air Force.
- Squadron Leader Christopher Mark Nickols, Royal Air Force.
- Flight Lieutenant Malcolm John Reeves, Royal Air Force.
- Squadron Leader Frank Lester Turner, Royal Air Force.
- Squadron Leader Jeremy Richard Woods, Royal Air Force.

== Australia ==
=== Knights Bachelor ===
State of Queensland

- John Reeve Nosworthy, C.B.E. For services to the legal profession and to the community.
- Clement William Bailey Renouf, A.M. For services to the community.

State of Tasmania

- The Honourable Eardley Max Bingham, Q.C. For services to the law.

=== Order of the British Empire ===
==== Commander of the Order of the British Empire (CBE) ====
Civil Division

State of Queensland

- Mr. Justice Bruce Harvey McPherson. For services to law reform
- James Elmslie Crawford Pennell. For services to local government and the community.

==== Officer of the Order of the British Empire (OBE) ====
Civil Division

State of Queensland

- Kevin James Cronin. For services to the community.
- Owen Kelvin Griffiths. For services to the community
- Clarence Morcom Manning. For services to the newspaper industry and to the community.
- William Wightman O'Brien. For services to the community.
- George MacLean Errol Offner. For services to accountancy and to the community.

==== Member of the Order of the British Empire (MBE) ====
Civil Division

State of Queensland

- Alan Cecil Cook. For services to the wine industry.
- Richard Patrick Healy. For services to the ruralfires board and to the community.
- Patrick Thomas King. For services to the tourist industry.
- Dr. Ivan Alexander Lester. For services to the community.
- Andre Auguste Maestracci. For services to the tourist industry.
- Frances Jocelyn Mrs. Reid. For services to the community.
- Alan John Sexton. For public service.
- Thomas Francis Wignall. For services to the community.

=== Companion of the Imperial Service Order (ISO) ===
State of Tasmania

- David Ewan Kirby. For public service.

=== British Empire Medal (BEM) ===
Civil Division

State of Queensland

- Frank Gabriel Barnett. For services to the community.
- Dr. John William Best. For services to the community.
- John Secular Brown. For services to the community.
- Bob Elias Browning. For services to the community.
- Frederick William Hacker. For services to the community.
- Victor Gerald Honour. For services to the community.
- Brian Anthony Hunt. For services to the community.
- Clarence Keith Muller. For services to the community.
- Fleming Henry Orr. For services to the community.
- Alexander Francis-Smith. For services to the community.
- Mrs Isabel Margaret Williams. For services to the community.

State of Tasmania

- Gordon William Edwards. For services to sport.
- Patrick Henry Harris. For services to ex-servicemen and the community.
- Mrs Audrey Macfarlane. For services to the community.

=== Queen's Fire Services Medal (QFSM) ===
State of Queensland

- Wallace Henry Belcher.

=== Queen's Police Medal (QPM) ===
State of Tasmania

- Senior Sergeant David Henry Grimsey.

== Mauritius ==
=== Knight Bachelor ===
- Baalkhristna Ramphul. For services to industry.

=== Order of Saint Michael and Saint George ===
==== Knight Commander of the Order of St Michael and St George (KCMG) ====
- The Right Honourable Anerood Jugnauth, Q.C., Prime Minister.

=== Order of the British Empire ===
==== Commander of the Order of the British Empire (CBE) ====
Civil Division

- Philippe Chan Kin. For services to industry.
- Michael Joseph Clency Leal. For services to trade and industry.

==== Officer of the Order of the British Empire (OBE) ====
Civil Division

- Namasivayam Balasoupramanien. For public service.
- Jean Philippe Fayolle. For services to shipping. Louis Cyril NICOLAS. For public service.
- Louis Rivaltz Quenette. For public service.
- Joseph Desire Robert Rivalland. For services to aviation and tourism.
- Ibrahim Abdoollah. For services to trade and the community.

==== Member of the Order of the British Empire (MBE) ====
Civil Division

- Vijay Abeeluck. For services to public health.
- Kesswarlall Bhautoo. For public service.
- Krylov Ramtohul. For public service.
- Thiagarajan Soomoo. For public service.

=== Companion of the Imperial Service Order (ISO) ===
- Marie Joseph Francois Louis Paul Lesage. For public service.

=== Mauritius Police Medal (MPM) ===
- Antoine Marie Therese Cyril Morvan, Superintendent of Police
- Sooroojparsad Ramessur, Superintendent of Police.
- Joseph Jacques Robinson, Police Sergeant.
- Hanuel Felix, Police Constable.

== Bahamas ==
=== Order of the British Empire ===
==== Commander of the Order of the British Empire (CBE) ====
Civil Division

- Revd. Dr. Michael Carrington Symonette. For services to religion.
- Bishop Brice Habgood Thompson. For services to religion.

=== British Empire Medal (BEM) ===
Civil Division

- Miss Joycelyn Eleanor Josey. For public service.
- John Henry Saunders. For public service.

== Grenada ==
=== Order of the British Empire ===
==== Officer of the Order of the British Empire (OBE) ====
Civil Division

- Leonard Anthony Purcell. For services to the community.

==== Member of the Order of the British Empire (MBE) ====
Civil Division

- Mrs. Judith Mends. For services to the community.

=== British Empire Medal (BEM) ===
Civil Division

- Edmund Emmons. For services to the community.

== Papua New Guinea ==
=== Knight Bachelor ===
- The Honourable Deputy Chief Justice Mari Kapi, CBE. For services to the law and the community.

=== Order of Saint Michael and Saint George ===
==== Companion of the Order of St Michael and St George (CMG) ====
- Harry Beresford Clifford Love, MBE. For public service and for services to the community.

=== Order of the British Empire ===
==== Knight Commander of the Order of the British Empire (KBE) ====
Civil Division

- The Right Reverend Bishop George Ambo, OBE. For public and community service.

==== Commander of the Order of the British Empire (CBE) ====
Military Division

Brigadier-General (84429) Rochus Lokinap, LVO. For service to the Papua New Guinea Defence Force.

Civil Division

- Ilinome Frank Tarua, OBE. For public service.
- Mea Vai, ISO. For services to the community.

==== Officer of the Order of the British Empire (OBE) ====
Civil Division

- Patrick Kalani Amini. For public service.
- John Kenneth Albert Clezy. For services tomedicine and to the community.
- Aphmeledy Kaumate Joel. For public service.
- Miss Rosalina Violet Kekedo, MBE. For services to education and to thecommunity.

==== Member of the Order of the British Empire (MBE) ====
Military Division

- Chief Warrant Officer (84561) Michael Daurobana. For service to the Papua New Guinea Defence Force.
- Warrant Officer (84341) Ted Tamita Sawefa. For service to the Papua New Guinea Defence Force.

Civil Division

- John Arthur Close. For services to education and to aviation.
- Father Timothy Brian Elliot. For services to the community.
- Ismael Getseme. For services to the community.
- Henry Linguai Ingirin. For public service.
- Pawa Kombea. For public service.
- Joseph James Tauvasa. For services to commerce and the community.
- Mrs Saraknel Rangatin Theckla. For services to the community.
- Patrick Blatch Wampa. For services to education and thecommunity.
- Jimmy Wan. For services to coffee exports.

=== Companion of the Imperial Service Order (ISO) ===
- Austin Thomas Sapias. For public service.

=== British Empire Medal (BEM) ===
Military Division

- Warrant Officer (83477) Bill Akwila. For service to the Papua New Quinea Defence Force.
- Sergeant (83551) Nicholas Kagl. For service to the Papua New Guinea Defence Force.

Civil Division

- Mekland Kakolo. For services to education.
- Kopon Konsul. For services to the community.
- Tei Kopi. For services to the community.
- Leslie Alfred Marsh. For services to the community.
- First Constable Perau Molong. For services to the Royal Papua New Guinea Constabulary.
- Mesa Negot Ami. For public service.
- Paul Ngat. For services to the community.
- Nelson Tarpangan. For services to education. Tamin TIMOTHY . For public service.
- Kuma Gabriel Waipek. For public service.
- Wena Wili. For services to the community.

== Solomon Islands ==
=== Order of the British Empire ===
==== Officer of the Order of the British Empire (OBE) ====
Civil Division

- Frank Ofagioro Kabul. For public service.
- Francis Joseph Saemala. For public service.

==== Member of the Order of the British Empire (MBE) ====
Civil Division

- Mrs. Hilary Broughton. For services to health and education.
- Daniel Sade. For public service.
- Robert Same. For public service.

=== British Empire Medal (BEM) ===
Civil Division

- Sergeant Ezra Deri. For public service.
- Uziel Ele. For public service.
- George Pitamama. For public service.

== Saint Lucia ==
=== Order of the British Empire ===
==== Officer of the Order of the British Empire (OBE) ====
Civil Division

- Fitzgerald Raphael Louisy, MBE. For public service.
- Rene Rufo Raveneau, JP. For services to agriculture.

==== Member of the Order of the British Empire (MBE) ====
Civil Division

- Laurie McLean Barnard. For services to agriculture.
- Miss Gildette Camilla Williams. For services to tourism.

=== British Empire Medal (BEM) ===
Civil Division

- Cassius Bertie Elias, JP. For services to the community and to commerce.
- George Eugene. For services to commerce.
- Mrs Marie Petrona Laurent. For services to the community and to commerce.
- Valence Riviere. For services to commerce.

== Saint Vincent and the Grenadines ==
=== Order of the British Empire ===
==== Officer of the Order of the British Empire (OBE) ====
Civil Division

- Henry Gaynes. For public service.

==== Member of the Order of the British Empire (MBE) ====
Civil Division

- Alison Lewis. For public service.

== Belize ==
=== Order of the British Empire ===
==== Member of the Order of the British Empire (MBE) ====
Military Division

- Major Earl Edward Arthurs,MVO. For services to the Belize Defence Force.

== Antigua and Barbuda ==
=== Order of the British Empire ===
==== Officer of the Order of the British Empire (OBE) ====
Civil Division

- Ernest Sylvester Benjamin. For public service.

==== Member of the Order of the British Empire (MBE) ====
Military Division

- Major Clyde Stevenson Walker. For services to Antigua and Barbuda Defence Force.

== Saint Christopher and Nevis ==
=== Order of the British Empire ===
==== Officer of the Order of the British Empire (OBE) ====
Civil Division

- Basil Michael Lynch King. For services to the community.

==== Member of the Order of the British Empire (MBE) ====
Civil Division

- Mrs. Rosalie Andre. For services to education.
- Mrs Dora Deane Stevens. For services to education.

=== British Empire Medal (BEM) ===
Civil Division

- Harold Farrell. For services to education.
