= Peter Gregson =

Peter Gregson may refer to:

- Sir Peter Gregson (civil servant) (1936–2015), British civil servant
- Sir Peter Gregson (engineer) (1957–2024), British engineer and university vice-chancellor
- Peter Gregson (cellist) (born 1987), British cellist and composer
