= Ørnskov =

Ørnskov is a Danish surname. Notable people with the surname include:

- Flemming Ørnskov (born 1958), Danish businessman
- Martin Ørnskov (born 1985), Danish football player

== See also ==
- Ørskov
