= Ørskov =

Ørskov is a Danish surname. Notable people with the surname include:

- Egil Robert Orskov, Danish-born Scottish agricultural scientist and development scholar
- Ida Ørskov (1922–2007), Danish physician and bacteriologist
- Willy Ørskov (1920–1990), Danish sculptor
