= Ian Grant (businessman) =

British businessman (1943–2022)

Sir Ian David Grant CBE DL FRAgS (28 July 1943 – 20 November 2022) was a British corporate director who was chairman and first commissioner of the Crown Estate. He also served as the Chairman of the Scottish Exhibition Centre from 2002 to 2013. Grant was knighted by Elizabeth II in 2010.

== Early life and education ==
Ian Grant was born on 28 July 1943. He was educated at Strathallan School in Perthshire and the Edinburgh and East of Scotland College of Agriculture.

== Career ==
- Director, East of Scotland farmers, 1976–2002.
- Chairman, Copa Cereals Group, Brussels, 1982–1986.
- Chairman, EEC Cereals Working Party, 1982–1988.
- Chairman, International Federation of Agricultural Producers, 1984–1989.
- President, National Farmers Union of Scotland, 1984–1990. (vice-president 1981–1984)
- Director, Clydesdale Bank plc, 1989–1997.
- Director, National Farmers Union Mutual Insurance Society, 1990–2008. (deputy chairman, 2003–2008)
- Director, Scottish and Southern Energy plc, 1992–2003. (deputy chairman, 2000–2003)
- Chairman, Scottish Tourist Board, 1990–1998. (board member, 1988–1998)
- Chairman, Cairngorms Partnership, 1998–2003.
- Chairman, Crown Estate 2002–2009. (commissioner, 1996–2009)
- Chairman, Scottish Exhibition Centre Ltd, 2002-20 (deputy chairman, 2001; director 1998–20)
- Member of the Council of CBI Scotland, 1984–1996.
- Member of the Scottish Economic Council, 1993–1997.
- Board Member, British Tourist Authority, 1990–1998.
- Vice-president of the Royal Smithfield Club.

== Personal life and death ==
Grant died on 20 November 2022, aged 79.

== Awards ==
- Appointed a Commander of the Order of the British Empire (CBE) in the 1988 Birthday Honours.
- Knighted in the 2010 New Year Honours.
- Appointed a Deputy Lieutenant, Perth and Kinross, 2010.
- Awarded an Honorary Doctorate in Business Administration from Napier University, 1999.
- Fellow of the Royal Agricultural Society.
