= Derek Bradbeer =

Sir John Derek Richardson Bradbeer, OBE, TD (29 October 1931 – 30 April 2016), commonly known as Sir Derek Bradbeer, was an English solicitor, Territorial Army officer, educational administrator and company director.

Born on 29 October 1931, Bradbeer was the son of William Bertram Bradbeer (died 1992) and Winifred, née Richardson (died 1985); his father was a provincial bank manager. He attended Canford School from 1946 to 1950, before studying at Sidney Sussex College, Cambridge, from where he graduated with a BA in 1955 (proceeding by convention to MA in 1959).

Bradbeer was admitted a solicitor in 1959, and joined the Newcastle-upon-Tyne-based firm of Wilkinson, Marshall, Clayton and Gibson (later Wilkinson Maughan), where he was made partner in 1961, continuing as such until 1997. Alongside his legal work, he was an officer in the Territorial Army, rising ultimately to take the rank of honorary colonel; he received the Territorial Decoration in 1965 and was appointed an Officer of the military division of the Order of the British Empire (OBE) in the 1973 New Year Honours. Bradbeer was also the chairman of North East Water from 1992 to 2002.

In 1973, Bradbeer was elected as one of two representatives for Northumbria on the Council of the Law Society of England and Wales; he served as president of the Law Society from 1987 to 1988, and was knighted for services to his profession in the 1988 Birthday Honours. He also served as president of the Newcastle upon Tyne Law Society from 1981 to 1982, and as a governor of the College of Law from 1983 and 2002 and the college's chairman from 1990 to 1999. While he had a reputation as a "traditionalist", he was also credited with working to "transform the College of Law from a sleepy vocational college into one of the biggest and most successful training schools in Europe".

Bradbeer died on 30 April 2016. He was survived by his wife Margaret Elizabeth, née Chantler; she was appointed a deputy lieutenant for Northumberland in 1997. Together, they had two children, Jeremy and Amanda; their only son, Jeremy John Chantler Bradbeer, married a granddaughter of the businessman and engineer Sir Robin McAlpine, CBE, is a solicitor, and has been chairman of the Nottingham Racecourse Committee since 2023.

Legal offices
Preceded by Sir John Wickerson	President of the Law Society of England and Wales; 1987–88	Succeeded by Sir Richard Gaskell
