= Richard Lloyd-Jones =

Welsh civil servant (1933–2025)

Sir Richard Anthony Lloyd Jones KCB (1 August 1933 – 22 June 2025) was a Welsh civil servant. He served as Permanent Secretary of the Welsh Office, 1985–93.

== Life and career ==
Lloyd Jones was born in Sculcoates, Yorkshire on 1 August 1933, the son of Robert Lloyd Jones and Anne Page. He was educated at Long Dene School in Edenbridge and Nottingham High School, before earning an MA at Balliol College, Oxford.

He entered the Admiralty in 1957 as Assistant Private Secretary to the First Lord of the Admiralty, 1959–62. He served as Private Secretary to the Secretary of the Cabinet, 1969–70 and as Assistant Secretary at the Ministry of Defence, 1970–74. He joined the Welsh Office in 1974 as Under Secretary, 1974–78; Deputy Secretary, 1978–85; and Permanent Secretary, 1985–93.

He had several other prominent roles, including chairman of the Civil Service Benevolent Fund, 1987–93 and of the Arts Council of Wales, 1994–99; Member of the BBC General Advisory Council, 1994–96; and Vice-Chairman of the Prince of Wales' Committee, 1993–96.

He was president of Ramblers Cymru 1993-2011, and a vice-president of Ramblers GB from 1998 until his death.

He was appointed a Companion of the Order of the Bath (CB) in the 1981 New Year Honours and knighted in the same order (KCB) in the 1988 Birthday Honours.

In 1955 he married Patricia Avril Mary Richmond (died 2002) with whom he had two daughters. In 2005 he married Helen Margaret Yewlett (née Lewis). He lived in Radyr, Cardiff.

Lloyd-Jones died on 22 June 2025, at the age of 91.
