= Linpac =

LINPAC Group Limited was founded in 1959 in Lincolnshire, England, as Lincolnshire Packaging - to produce paper packaging for local fresh food producers. It is now an international business valued at almost £500,000,000, providing mainly plastic packaging and supply chain manufacturing and services business. The company is based in Featherstone, West Yorkshire, England, and in 2015 had 2,500 employees worldwide.

== Divisions ==
LINPAC Group comprises three main divisions:

- LINPAC Packaging (formerly LINPAC Plastics), formed in 1969.
- LINPAC Allibert (created in 2007 from the merger of Allibert with LINPAC Materials Handling).
- Ropak Packaging (acquired in 1995).

Viscount Plastics, acquired in 2001, was sold in 2012.

== Products ==
The company manufactures food packaging, returnable transit packaging (RTP), rigid plastic containers, cartridges, bulk storage tanks, bulk containers, medical containers, spill control products, and GRP gratings and structures. It also provides services related to these products - including design and manufacture - and asset management.

LINPAC is a private company (ranked 37th in The Times Top Track 100 list of private UK companies 2010) and is owned by a consortium of banks.

LINPAC's founders include Evan Cornish, who died in 2002. The Evan Cornish Foundation now supports, among other causes, the Louth & District Hospice.

LINPAC's Standard Industrial Classification (SIC) code is 70100: Activities of head offices.
