= Peter Gregson (civil servant) =

Sir Peter Gregson GCB

Permanent Secretary of the Department of Trade and Industry
- In office 1989–1996
- Monarch: Queen Elizabeth II
- Prime Minister: Margaret Thatcher; John Major

Permanent Secretary of the Department of Energy
- In office 1985–1989
- Monarch: Queen Elizabeth II
- Prime Minister: Margaret Thatcher

Personal details
- Born: Peter Lewis Gregson; 28 June 1936 Haworth, Yorkshire, England
- Died: 12 December 2015 (aged 79)
- Education: Nottingham High School
- Alma mater: Balliol College, Oxford
- Awards: CB (1983); KCB (1988); GCB (1996)

Military service
- Allegiance: United Kingdom
- Branch/service: British Army
- Years of service: 1959–1961
- Rank: Lieutenant
- Unit: Royal Army Educational Corps
- Battles/wars: Cold War

Sir Peter Lewis Gregson, GCB (28 June 1936 – 12 December 2015) was a British civil servant. He was Permanent Secretary of the Department of Energy from 1985 to 1989, and of the Department of Trade and Industry from 1989 until his retirement in 1996.

== Early life and education ==
Gregson was born on 28 June 1936 in Haworth, Yorkshire, England. He was the only child born to Lillian and Walter, a local school teacher. In 1945, his family moved to Nottingham, Nottinghamshire. In 1947, he won a scholarship to Nottingham High School, then an all-boys private school in Nottingham. He ended his time there as head boy of the sixth form and vice-captain of the school.

Gregson won an open scholarship to study classics at Balliol College, Oxford, and matriculated in 1955. He achieved a first in Mods (Latin and Greek language and literature) in 1957, and a first in Greats (specialising in philosophy and ancient history) in 1959. He therefore graduated from the University of Oxford with a double first-class honours Bachelor of Arts (BA) degree in 1959. He was active in the Oxford Union, the university debating society, though he never stood for an elected office.

== Career ==
Having achieved such a high class degree, Gregson's college tutor recommended an academic career, but only if he couldn't find an alternative. After graduating, he joined the civil service where he spent most of his career and never entered academia.

=== Military service ===
After university, Gregson was called up to complete his National Service. On 7 September 1959, he was commissioned into the Royal Army Educational Corps as a second lieutenant (on probation); his commission was confirmed in May 1960. He served as an education officer attached to the Sherwood Foresters. On 1 October 1961, he was transferred to the Regular Army Reserve of Officers, thereby ending his full-time service in the British Army. He was promoted to lieutenant on 7 March 1965.

Gregson later said that he learnt more about leadership and management during his military service than in the first few years in the civil service.

=== Civil Service career ===
In 1959, Gregson sat the civil service exam and scored highly enough to be selected for the elite Administrative Class of Civil Service. However, he did not start working as a civil servant immediately. Instead, he served in the British Army for two years as part of National Service.

In 1961, Gregson joined the Board of Trade. His first job was to prepare briefs for negotiations involved in Britain's first attempt to join the European Common Market; it was unsuccessful. In 1963, he was appointed Private Secretary to the Minister of State for Overseas Development. During this 18-month posting, he spent his time organising and taking part in ministerial visits to 16 different countries.

== Honours ==
In the 1983 New Year Honours, Gregson was appointed a Companion of the Order of the Bath (CB) in recognition of his service as Deputy Secretary of the Cabinet Office. In the 1988 Queen's Birthday Honours, he was promoted to Knight Commander of the Order of the Bath (KCB) in recognition of his service as Permanent Under Secretary Of State in the Department of Energy, and therefore granted the title sir. In the 1996 New Year Honours, he was promoted to a Knight Grand Cross (the highest rank) of the Order of the Bath (GCB) in recognition of his service as Permanent Secretary of the Department of Trade and Industry.
