= Anthony Kelly (materials scientist) =

British materials scientist (1929–2014)

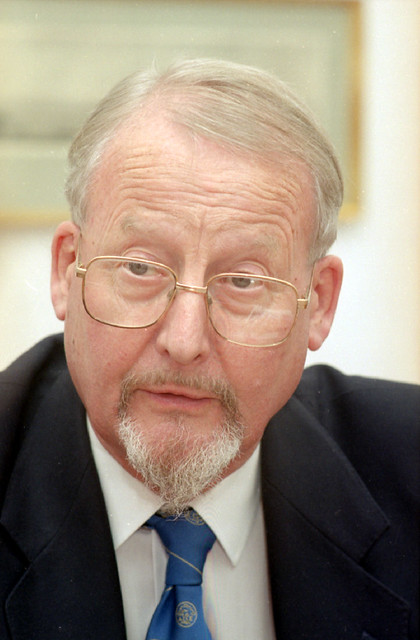
Anthony Kelly

Anthony Kelly CBE FRS (25 January 1929 — 3 June 2014) was a British materials scientist.

He joined the Crystallography Research Group in the Cavendish Laboratory in 1950, after completing his physics undergraduate degree at the University of Reading. In the 50s, he held positions at the University of Illinois, the University of Birmingham, and Northwestern University, before returning to Cambridge in 1959 as lecturer in the department of metallurgy.

In 1967, he moved to the National Physical Laboratory, where he worked first in the Division of Inorganic and Metallic Structure, and then in the Materials Group as deputy director. Whilst still involved with NPL, he served an extensive period as Vice Chancellor of the University of Surrey from 1975 to 1994. He returned to Cambridge in 1994 as a distinguished research fellow in the Department of Materials Science.

He was elected Fellow of the Royal Society in 1973, Fellow of the Royal Academy of Engineering in 1979.
