= Alcon Copisarow =

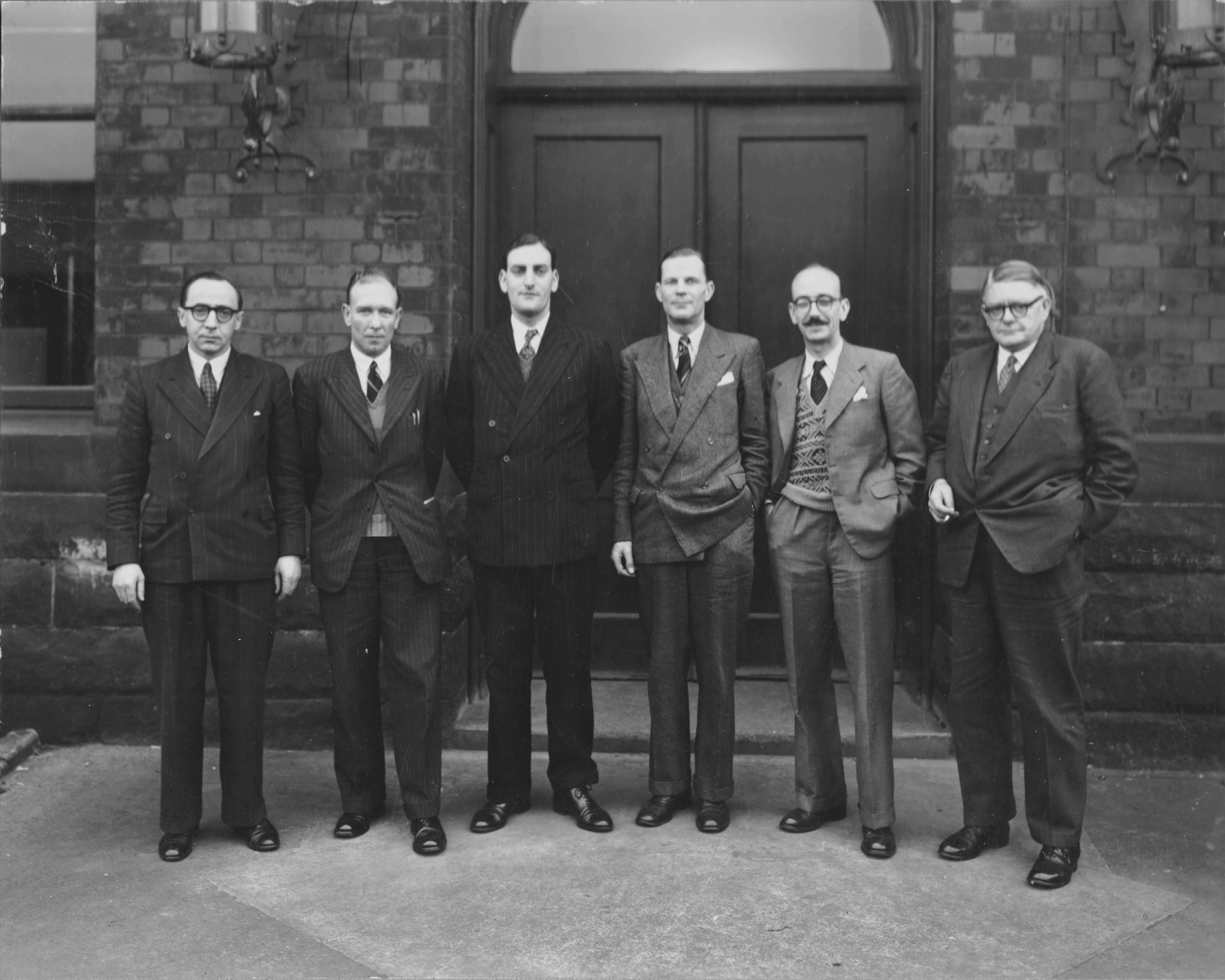
Alcon Copisarow (3rd from left) in 1953

Sir Alcon Charles Copisarow (25 June 1920 – 2 August 2017) was a British civil servant and management consultant who was the British government's chief scientific adviser at the Ministry of Technology during the Harold Wilson government.

== Early life ==
Copisarow was born at Moss Side, Manchester to Maurice (né Moses) Copisarow (1889–1959) and Eda (née Cohen). Maurice Copisarow was a chemist who worked for the Ministry of Munitions during the First World War and, despite his later blindness (possibly caused by contact with toxic chemicals), continued to produce highly regarded papers on subjects as varied as cancer research and agricultural chemistry. His father, Elkana (later "Conan") Copisarow, was a rabbinical scholar of Biruch, Russia, who settled in Manchester in 1908.

Alcon Copisarow was educated at Manchester University, Imperial College London, and the Sorbonne.

== Career ==
During the Second World War, Copisarow served in the Royal Navy as a lieutenant. He subsequently held Civil Service and other governmental posts: Scientific Counsellor at the British Embassy, Paris 1954–60, Director of Forest Products Research Laboratory 1960–2, Chief Technical Officer, NEDC 1962–4, Chief Scientific Officer, Ministry of Technology 1964–6. He was knighted in 1988.

== Personal life ==
In 1954, Copisarow married Diana (1933-2019), daughter of Maj. Ellis James Castello, M.C. and a descendant on her mother's side of Alfred Louis Cohen, brother of Sir Benjamin Cohen, 1st Baronet. They had four children.
