= Parliamentary Counsel Office (Scotland) =

The Scottish Government's Parliamentary Counsel Office (PCO) is a directorate of the Scottish Government. It currently sits within the Scottish Government Finance Directorates.

Before 12 January 2015, PCO was known as the Office of the Scottish Parliamentary Counsel.

PCO drafts Scottish Parliament Bills for the legislative programme of the Scottish Ministers.
