= Egil Robert Orskov =

Danish born Scottish agricultural scientist and development scholar (1934–2021)

Egil Robert Ørskov, OBE, FRSE (24 March 1934 – 12 April 2021) was a Danish-born Scottish agricultural scientist and development scholar, known particularly for his research on the nutrition of farm animals. Ørskov died in Aberdeen, Scotland on 12 April 2021, at the age of 87.

== Selected publications ==
- Ørskov, E.R. and McDonald, I., 1979. The estimation of protein degradability in the rumen from incubation measurements weighted according to rate of passage. The Journal of Agricultural Science, 92(2), pp. 499–503.
- Mehrez, A.Z., Ørskov, E.R. and McDonald, I., 1977. Rates of rumen fermentation in relation to ammonia concentration. British Journal of Nutrition, 38(3), pp. 437–443.
- Orskov, E.R., 1982. Protein nutrition in ruminants. Academic Press Inc.(London) Ltd.

== Alma Mater ==
- Copenhagen University, University of Reading.

== Career ==
- Rowett Research Institute, Macaulay Land Research Institute and the James Hutton Institute.

== Awards ==
- OBE 1988
- Royal Society of Edinburgh 1991
