= List of honorary fellows of Lucy Cavendish College, Cambridge =

This is a list of Honorary Fellows of Lucy Cavendish College, Cambridge

- Judi Dench
- Anna Ford
- Margrethe II of Denmark
- Anne McLaren
- Pauline Perry, Baroness Perry of Southwark
- Alison Richard
- Stella Rimington
- Janet Todd
- Claire Tomalin
- Jackie Ashley
- Carol Black
- Jane Clarke
- Sharmishta Chakrabarti
- Cohen of Pimlico
- Edwina Dunn
- Cynthia Glassman
- Judith Hanratty
- Kennedy of the Shaws
- Queen Margrethe II of Denmark
- Anne Owers
- Nirmala Rao
- Alec Russel
- Ali Smith
- Sandy Toksvig
- Veronica Sutherland
- Sarah Sands
- Ngozi Okonjo-Iweala
- Jane McNeill
- Derek Laud
- Pauline Harris
- Sophie Hannah
