= Colleges of the University of Cambridge =

Arms of the University of Cambridge

The University of Cambridge is composed of 31 colleges in addition to the academic departments and administration of the central university.

Until the mid-19th century, both Cambridge and Oxford comprised a group of colleges with a small central university administration, rather than universities in the common sense. Cambridge's colleges are communities of students, academics and staff – an environment in which generations and academic disciplines are able to mix, with both students and fellows experiencing "the breadth and excellence of a top University at an intimate level".

Cambridge colleges provide most of the accommodation for undergraduates and postgraduates at the university. At the undergraduate level they have responsibility for admitting students to the university, providing pastoral support, and organising elements of their tuition, though lectures and examinations are organised by the faculties and departments of the central university. All degrees are awarded by the university itself, not the colleges, and all students study for the same course regardless of which college they attend. For postgraduate students, research is conducted centrally in the faculties, departments and other university-affiliated research centres, though the colleges provide a central social and intellectual hub for students.

Colleges provide a range of facilities and services to their members in addition to accommodation, including catering, library facilities, extracurricular societies, and sporting teams. Much of sporting life at Cambridge is centred around college teams and inter-collegiate competition in Cuppers. Student activity is typically organised through separate common rooms for undergraduate and postgraduate students. Another important element of collegiate life is formal hall, which range in frequency from weekly to every night of the week during Full Term.

Colleges also provide funding, accommodation, or both, for some of the academic posts in the university, with the majority of Cambridge academics being a fellow of a college in addition to their faculty/departmental role. Fellows may therefore hold college positions in addition to their academic posts at the university: these include roles such as Tutor (responsible for pastoral support), Director of Studies (responsible for academic oversight of students taking a particular subject), Dean (responsible for discipline among college members), Senior Tutor (responsible for the college's overall academic provision), or Head of college ("Head of House").

Colleges are self-governed charities in their own right, with their own endowments and possessions.

== 'Old' and 'new' colleges ==
The University of Cambridge has 31 colleges, founded between the 13th and 20th centuries. No colleges were founded between 1596 (Sidney Sussex College) and 1800 (Downing College), which allows the colleges to be distinguished into two groups according to foundation date:

- the sixteen 'old' colleges, founded between 1284 and 1596, and
- the fifteen 'new' colleges, founded between 1800 and 1977.

The oldest college is Peterhouse, founded in 1284, and the newest is Robinson, founded in 1977. Homerton, which was first founded in the 18th century as a dissenting academy (and later teacher training college), attained full college status in 2010.

Five of the 'new' colleges (Churchill, Fitzwilliam, Lucy Cavendish, Murray Edwards and St Edmund's) are located in the Castle Hill area and are thus sometimes referred to as "hill colleges".

== Restrictions on entry ==
All 16 of the "old" colleges and 8 of the 15 "new" ones admit both male and female students as both undergraduates and postgraduates, without any age restrictions. Seven colleges restrict entry by sex, or by age of undergraduates, or admit only postgraduates:

- Murray Edwards and Newnham admit only women;
- Clare Hall and Darwin admit only postgraduates;
- Hughes Hall, St Edmund's and Wolfson admit only mature students and postgraduates.

No colleges are all-male, although most originally were. Darwin, founded in 1964, was the first mixed college. In 1972, Churchill, Clare and King's colleges were the first previously all-male colleges to admit women, whilst King's accepted only students from Eton College until 1865. The last all-male college to become mixed was Magdalene, in 1988. In 1973, Hughes Hall became the first all-female college to admit men, and Girton first admitted men in 1979. Lucy Cavendish admitted only female mature students and postgraduates until 2021.

Newnham also places restrictions on the admission of staff members, allowing only women to become fellows of the college. Murray Edwards does not place this restriction on fellows.

== Architectural influence ==
The Cambridge and Oxford colleges have served as an architectural inspiration for Collegiate Gothic architecture, used by a number of American universities including Princeton University, Cornell University, University of Chicago, and Washington University in St. Louis since the late nineteenth century.

== List of colleges ==
College (with arms and scarf colours)	Founded (Note: Principal date given is the date of establishment acknowledged by the university. Additional later dates are explained by further footnotes.)	Sister college at Oxford	Head of House	Student numbers			Endowment	Net assets	Assets per student	Abbreviation (and short form)	Notes
College (with arms and scarf colours)	Founded	Sister college at Oxford	Head of House	Undergraduates	Postgraduates	Total	Endowment	Net assets	Assets per student	Abbreviation (and short form)	Notes
Christ's CollegeScarf colours: brown, with two equally-spaced narrow white stripes	1505	Wadham College	Lord McDonald of Salford	433	294	727	£144.9M	£300.6M	£413k	CHR	Re-foundation of Godshouse (est. 1439)
Churchill CollegeScarf colours: black, with two equally-spaced narrow stripes of brown edged with pink	1960 (1966) (Note: Date of recognition by the university as a constituent college.)	Trinity College	Professor Sharon Peacock	478	334	812	£118.4M	£205.5M	£253k	CHU	
Clare CollegeScarf colours: black, with two equally-spaced narrow yellow stripes	1326 (1336) (Note: Date of re-foundation by later benefactor.)	Oriel College; St. Hugh's College	Loretta Minghella	488	273	761	£203.9M	£385.6M	£507k	CL	Formerly University Hall, then Clare Hall.
Clare HallScarf colours: black, with two equally-spaced narrow stripes of red edged with yellow	1966 (1984) (Note: Date of royal charter, and of recognition by the university as a constituent college.)	St Cross College	C. Alan Short	0	271	271	£35.5M	£42.7M	£158k	CLH	Postgraduate-only.
Corpus Christi CollegeScarf colours: cherry pink, with two equally-spaced narrow white stripes	1352	Corpus Christi College	Christopher Kelly	323	178	501	£153.7M	£256.9M	£513k	CC (Corpus)	Formerly St Benet's College.
Darwin CollegeScarf colours: blue, with two equally-spaced narrow sets of three adjacent red, Cambridge blue and yellow stripes, with the red stripes closest to the edge of the scarf, and the yellow stripes closest to the centre	1964 (1976)	Wolfson College	Nigel Peake	0	725	725	£35.5M	£90.4M	£125k	DAR	Postgraduate-only.
Downing CollegeScarf colours: black, with three narrow magenta stripes	1800	Lincoln College	Graham Virgo	476	429	905	£82.0M	£247.4M	£273k	DOW	
Emmanuel CollegeScarf colours: navy, with two equally-spaced narrow rose pink stripes	1584	Exeter College	Douglas Chalmers	518	232	750	£361.7M	£401.7M	£536k	EM (Emma)	
Fitzwilliam CollegeScarf colours: maroon, with two equally-spaced narrow grey stripes	1869 (1966)	St Edmund Hall	Baroness Morgan of Huyton	491	427	918	£102.5M	£168.9M	£184k	F (Fitz)	
Girton CollegeScarf colours: green, with two equally-spaced narrow stripes of red edged with white	1869 (1924) (Note: Date of royal charter.) (1948)	Somerville College	Elisabeth Kendall	521	389	910	£136.8M	£190.7M	£210k	G	Formerly female-only; mixed from 1976.
Gonville and Caius CollegeScarf colours: four equal stripes alternating black and Cambridge blue	1348 (1557) (Note: Date of royal charter re-founding Gonville Hall as Gonville and Caius College.)	Brasenose College	Richard Gilbertson	595	258	853	£285.8M	£412.1M	£483k	CAI (Caius)	Caius, pronounced "keys".; Formerly Gonville Hall.
Homerton CollegeScarf colours: navy, with two equally-spaced narrow white stripes	1768 (1976) (Note: Date of first formal recognition by the university, but not yet as a constituent college.) (2010)	Harris Manchester College; Mansfield College	Lord Woolley of Woodford	600	755	1355	£139.1M	£219.4M	£162k	HO	Originally mixed, then became women-only on move to Cambridge; returned to mixed from 1976.
Hughes HallScarf colours: light blue with three equally-spaced narrow stripes, the outer stripes of Cambridge blue and wider, the central stripe of white and narrower	1885 (1949) (2006)	Linacre College	Sir Laurie Bristow	169	814	983	£19.5M	£64.1M	£65k	HH	Mature-only. (Note: Mature-only colleges admit only postgraduate students or undergraduate students over the age of 21.)
Jesus CollegeScarf colours: three equal stripes of red and black, with red in the middle on one side of the scarf, and black in the middle on the other	1496	Jesus College	Sonita Alleyne	530	394	924	£242.0M	£395.2M	£428k	JE	
King's CollegeScarf colours: royal purple, with two equally-spaced narrow white stripes	1441	New College	Gillian Tett	465	373	838	£232.5M	£471.4M	£563k	K	
Lucy Cavendish CollegeScarf colours: eight alternating stripes of black and blue of varying width, with wide black and narrow blue stripes transitioning towards narrow black and wide blue stripes across the face of the scarf	1965 (1997)	Regent's Park College	Girish Menon	461	700	1161	£18.8M	£61.0M	£53k	LC (Lucy Cav, Lucy)	Formerly mature-only, and female-only; all-age from 2020, mixed from 2021.
Magdalene CollegeScarf colours: navy, with two equally-spaced narrow lavender stripes	1428 (1542) (Note: Date of royal charter re-founding Buckingham College as Magdalene College.)	Magdalen College	Sir Christopher Greenwood	384	203	587	£106.0M	£208.9M	£356k	M	Magdalene, pronounced /ˈmɔːd.lɪn/.; Formerly Buckingham College.
Murray Edwards CollegeScarf colours: three equally-spaced narrow stripes separating two black areas towards the edge and two blue areas in the middle, the outer stripes of yellow and the central stripe of red	1954 (1972) (2011) (Note: Date of supplemental royal charter re-founding New Hall as Murray Edwards College.)	St Anne's College	Rachel Polonsky (acting)	393	230	623	£82.1M	£121.3M	£195k	MUR (Medwards)	Female students-only, mixed fellowship.; Formerly New Hall.
Newnham CollegeScarf colours: grey, with a central broad band of navy, itself divided in two by a narrow gold stripe	1871 (1917) (1957) (Note: Date of supplemental royal charter, and of recognition by the university as a constituent college.)	Lady Margaret Hall	Jacqueline Morgan	415	288	703	£138.6M	£275.5M	£392k	N	Female-only.
Pembroke CollegeScarf colours: dark blue, with two equally-spaced narrow Cambridge blue stripes	1347	The Queen's College	Rosalind Polly Blakesley	486	290	776	£118.7M	£324.1M	£418k	PEM	Formerly Pembroke Hall.
PeterhouseScarf colours: four equal stripes alternating white and blue	1284	Merton College	Andy Parker	310	206	516	£256.4M	£417.3M	£809k	PET	
Queens' CollegeScarf colours: dark green, with two equally-spaced narrow white stripes	1448 (1465)	Pembroke College	Dame Menna Rawlings	536	498	1034	£144.5M	£170.5M	£165k	Q	
Robinson CollegeScarf colours: from one edge of the scarf to the other, the first third grey, then three equal stripes of blue, gold and grey, and then the final third blue	1977 (1984)	St Catherine's College	Sir Richard Heaton	422	212	634	£86.8M	£129.3M	£204k	R	
St Catharine's CollegeScarf colours: burgundy, with narrow pearl pink stripes	1473	Worcester College	Sir John Benger	492	332	824	£139.9M	£191.2M	£232k	CTH (Catz)	Katz. Formerly Catharine Hall.
St Edmund's CollegeScarf colours: blue, with two equally-spaced narrow stripes of Cambridge blue edged with white	1896 (1965) (1998)	Green Templeton College	Chris Young	206	631	837	£11.5M	£48.9M	£58k	ED (Eddie's)	Mature-only.
St John's CollegeScarf colours: navy, with two equally-spaced narrow stripes of Cambridge blue edged with red	1511	Balliol College	Heather Hancock	610	362	972	£787.2M	£1,038M	£1,068k	JN (John's)	
Selwyn CollegeScarf colours: maroon, with three narrow gold stripes through the middle, the central stripe slightly narrower than others	1882 (1883) (1958)	Keble College	Suzanne Raine	416	264	680	£83.6M	£147.3M	£217k	SE	
Sidney Sussex CollegeScarf colours: two equal halves of dark-red and navy	1596	St John's College	Martin Burton	400	261	661	£123.2M	£161.4M	£244k	SID (Sidney)	
Trinity CollegeScarf colours: navy, with three equally-spaced narrow stripes, the outer stripes of yellow and slightly narrower, the central stripe of red and slightly wider	1546	Christ Church College	Sir David Baulcombe	693	303	996	£2,700M	£2,558M	£2,568k	T	Founded by merger of King's Hall (est. 1317) and Michaelhouse (est. 1324).
Trinity HallScarf colours: black, with two equally-spaced narrow white stripes	1350	All Souls College; University College	Mary Hockaday	379	188	567	£402.8M	£430.7M	£760k	TH (Tit Hall)	
Wolfson CollegeScarf colours: red, with two equally-spaced narrow golden stripes edged with white	1965 (1977)	St Antony's College	Professor Dame Ijeoma Uchegbu	158	965	1123	£42.0M	£96.0M	£85k	W	Mature-only.; Formerly University College.
Totals:				12,848	12,079	24,927	£7,536M	£10,232M			

University and colleges consolidated information
Institutions(s)	Founded	Head	Undergraduates	Postgraduates	Total	Endowment (2025)	Net Assets (2025)	Assets per student (2025)
University of Cambridge	c. 1209	Deborah Prentice; Vice-Chancellor since 2023	12,354	10,893	23,247	£2,760M	£8,263M	£355k
Colleges	1284–1977	(See list)	" "	" "	" "	£7,536M	£10,232M	£410k
Totals:			12,354	10,893	23,247	£10,296M	£18,495M	£765k

There are also several theological colleges in the city of Cambridge (for example Ridley Hall, Wesley House, Westcott House and Westminster College) that are affiliated with the university through the Cambridge Theological Federation. These colleges, while not officially part of the University of Cambridge, operate programmes that are either validated by or are taught on behalf either of the university or of Anglia Ruskin or Durham Universities.

Timeline of the colleges in the order their students are presented for graduation, compared with some events in British history.

== Heads of colleges ==
Most colleges are led by a Master, even when the Master is female. However, there are some exceptions, listed below. Girton College has always had a Mistress, even though male candidates have been able to run for the office since 1976.

- Mistress: Girton College
- President: Clare Hall, Hughes Hall, Lucy Cavendish College, Murray Edwards College, Queens' College, Wolfson College
- Principal: Homerton College, Newnham College
- Provost: King's College
- Warden: Robinson College

Also see List of current heads of University of Cambridge colleges.

== Former colleges ==
The above list does not include several former colleges that no longer exist. These include:

- Ayerst Hostel, founded in 1884 by William Ayerst but closed in 1896. Buildings used by St Edmund's House from 1896 and later St Edmund's College in 1996.
- Buckingham College, founded in 1428 as a Benedictine hall, refounded as Magdalene in 1542.
- Bull College, an unofficial college for US GIs returning from World War II, existing in Michaelmas 1945 and Lent 1946.
- Cavendish College, founded in 1873, an attempt to allow poorer students to sit the Tripos examinations, whose buildings were bought by Homerton in 1895.
- "Clare Hall" was the name of Clare College between 1338 and 1856. Clare College founded a new college named Clare Hall in 1966.
- Gonville Hall, founded in 1348, and re-founded in 1557 as Gonville and Caius College.
- God's House, founded in 1437, and re-founded in 1505 as Christ's College.
- King's Hall, founded in 1317, and combined with Michaelhouse to form Trinity College in 1546.
- Michaelhouse, founded in 1324, and combined with King's Hall to form Trinity College in 1546.
- New Hall, founded in 1954, and re-founded in 2008 as Murray Edwards College
- Physwick Hostel – a predecessor of Gonville and Caius College
- University College, founded in 1965, and re-founded in 1972 as Wolfson College
- University Hall, founded in 1326, refounded as Clare Hall in 1338, renamed as Clare College in 1856.

== See also ==
- Colleges of Durham University
- Colleges of the University of Oxford
- Colleges of the University of York
- List of current heads of University of Cambridge colleges
- List of fictional Cambridge colleges
- List of Oxbridge sister colleges
