= List of ambassadors of the United Kingdom to Liberia =

His Britannic Majesty's Ambassador to the Republic of Liberia
- Royal Arms of His Majesty's Government
- Style: His Excellency

The ambassador of the United Kingdom to Liberia is the United Kingdom's foremost diplomatic representative in the Republic of Liberia.

Liberia has been an independent state since 1847, but until 1946 the UK mission was only at the level of consul or consul-general. From 1991 to 2003 the British ambassador to Ivory Coast was non-resident ambassador to Liberia, and from 2003 to 2013 the British high commissioner to Sierra Leone was non-resident ambassador. From 2013 the UK again has a resident ambassador at Monrovia.

== List of heads of mission ==
=== Consuls ===
- 1847
- 1902–1905: Capt Charles Francis Cromie, for Republic of Liberia, and for French Western Africa

=== Envoys extraordinary and ministers plenipotentiary ===
- 1946–1949: John Bowering
- 1949–1951: John Baillie
- 1951–1952: Charles Capper

=== Ambassadors extraordinary and plenipotentiary ===
- 1952–1957: Charles Capper
- 1957–1960: Guy Clarke
- 1960–1963: Harold Brown
- 1963–1967: Malcolm Walker
- 1967–1970: John Curle
- 1970–1973: Martin Moynihan
- 1973–1978: John Reiss
- 1978–1980: John Gordon Doubleday
- 1980–1985: Dougal Reid
- 1985–1987: Alec Ibbott
- 1988–1990: Michael Gore
- 1990–1997: Margaret Rothwell (non-resident)
- 1997–2001: Haydon Warren-Gash (non-resident)
- 2001–2003: Francois Gordon (non-resident)
- 2003–2006: John Mitchiner (non-resident)
- 2006–2008: Sarah MacIntosh (non-resident)
- 2009–2013: Ian Hughes (non-resident)
- 2013–2015: Fergus Cochrane-Dyet
- 2015–2020 David Belgrove
- 2020–2025: Neil Bradley
- 2026-present: Paul Simister
