= List of current heads of University of Cambridge colleges =

A list of current heads of colleges at the University of Cambridge, England.

| College | Incumbent | Title | Appointed |
|---|---|---|---|
| Christ's | The Lord McDonald of Salford | Master | 2022 |
| Churchill | Sharon Peacock | Master | 2024 |
| Clare | Loretta Minghella | Master | 2021 |
| Clare Hall | C. Alan Short | President | 2020 |
| Corpus Christi | Christopher Kelly | Master | 2018 |
| Darwin | Mike Rands | Master | 2020 |
| Downing | Graham Virgo | Master | 2023 |
| Emmanuel | Lt Gen Douglas Chalmers | Master | 2021 |
| Fitzwilliam | The Baroness Morgan of Huyton | Master | 2019 |
| Girton | Elisabeth Kendall | Mistress | 2022 |
| Gonville and Caius | Richard Gilbertson | Master | 2025 |
| Homerton | The Lord Woolley of Woodford | Principal | 2021 |
| Hughes Hall | Sir Laurie Bristow | President | 2022 |
| Jesus | Sonita Alleyne | Master | 2019 |
| King's | Gillian Tett | Provost | 2023 |
| Lucy Cavendish | Girish Menon | President | 2025 |
| Magdalene | Sir Christopher Greenwood | Master | 2020 |
| Murray Edwards | Rachel Polonsky (acting) | President | 2025 |
| Newnham | Alison Rose | Principal | 2019 |
| Pembroke | Rosalind Polly Blakesley | Master | 2025 |
| Peterhouse | Andy Parker | Master | 2023 |
| Queens' | Dame Menna Rawlings | President | 2025 |
| Robinson | Sir Richard Heaton | Warden | 2021 |
| St Catharine's | John Benger | Master | 2023 |
| St Edmund's | Chris Young | Master | 2024 |
| St John's | Heather Hancock | Master | 2020 |
| Selwyn | Suzanne Raine | Master | 2025 |
| Sidney Sussex | Martin Burton | Master | 2023 |
| Trinity | Dame Sally Davies | Master | 2019 |
| Trinity Hall | Mary Hockaday | Master | 2022 |
| Wolfson | Dame Ijeoma Uchegbu | President | 2024 |
