= List of ambassadors of Great Britain to Denmark =

Ambassador of Great Britain to Denmark
- Arms of Great Britain
- Style: His Excellency
- Residence: Copenhagen
- Appointer: The monarch
- Inaugural holder: Daniel Pulteney; First Ambassador of Great Britain to Denmark (Envoy Extraordinary)
- Final holder: William Drummond of Logiealmond; Last Ambassador of Great Britain to Denmark (Chargé d'Affaires)

The ambassador of Great Britain to Denmark was the foremost diplomatic representative in Denmark (also referred to as the kingdoms of Denmark and Norway) of the Kingdom of Great Britain, a European state created by the Treaty of Union of 1707, in charge of the British diplomatic mission to Copenhagen.

For ambassadors from the Court of St James's to Denmark before 1707, see the list of ambassadors of the Kingdom of England to Denmark. For ambassadors after 1800, see the list of ambassadors of the United Kingdom to Denmark.

== Envoys extraordinary of Great Britain to Denmark ==
- 1706—1715 Daniel Pulteney
- 1715—1721: Alexander Hume-Campbell, but Ambassador 1720—1721
- 1721—1729: John Campbell, Lord Glenorchy
  - 1727: Admiral Sir John Norris
  - 1729: Brigadier Richard Sutton Special military mission
- 1730—1768: Walter Titley Secretary in charge of affairs 1729-30; Minister Resident 1730—1739; then Envoy Extraordinary
  - 1763—1765: Dudley Alexander Sydney Cosby Minister Resident
- 1766—1771: Robert Gunning Minister Resident 1766; then Envoy Extraordinary
- 1771—1772: Robert Murray Keith (the younger)
- 1772—1773: Ralph Woodford
- 1773—1779: Daniel de Laval Minister Resident 1774—1778; then Envoy Extraordinary
- 1779—1783: Morton Eden
- 1783—1789: Hugh Elliot
- 1789—1790: J. Johnstone
- 1790: George Hammond Chargé d'Affaires
- 1790—1792: Francis Drake Chargé d'Affaires
- 1792—1794: Daniel Hailes
- 1794—1796: James Craufurd Chargé d'Affaires
- 1796—1800: Lord Robert FitzGerald
  - 1800: Charles Whitworth, 1st Baron Whitworth Plenipotentiary on Extraordinary Mission
- 1800—1801: William Drumond Chargé d'Affaires
