= List of ambassadors of the United Kingdom to Denmark =

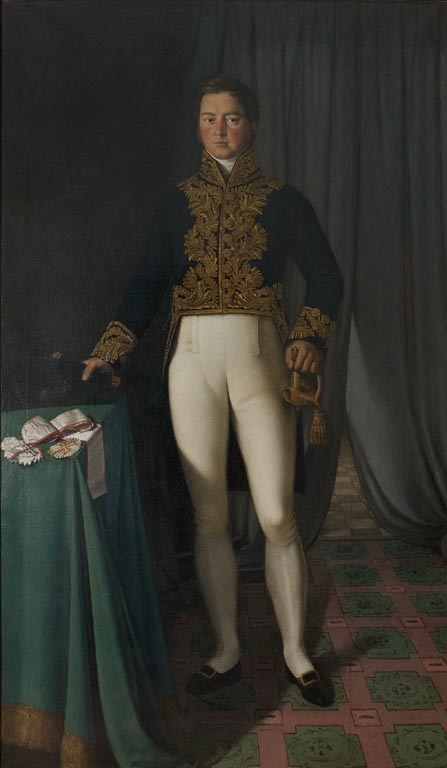
Sir Augustus Foster, 1st Baronet, British Minister to Denmark from 1814 to 1824, painted by Christian Albrecht Jensen (1825).

The ambassador of the United Kingdom to Denmark is the United Kingdom's foremost diplomatic representative in Denmark, and head of the UK's diplomatic mission in Denmark. The official title is His Britannic Majesty's Ambassador to the Kingdom of Denmark.

Until 1947, the British representative in Denmark held the rank of Minister, and the Danish representative in the UK the corresponding rank of Gesandt. In 1947, Denmark and the United Kingdom upgraded their diplomatic representations to each other and both heads of mission have since held the rank of Ambassador.

For Ambassadors from the Court of St. James's to Denmark before 1707, see List of ambassadors of the Kingdom of England to Denmark. For Ambassadors from 1707 to 1800, see List of ambassadors of Great Britain to Denmark.

== List of heads of mission ==
=== Envoys extraordinary and ministers plenipotentiary of the United Kingdom ===
1801–1802: No diplomatic relations

- 1801–1802: Alleyne FitzHerbert, 1st Baron St Helens Plenipotentiary
- 1802–1805: Francis Hill chargé d'affaires
  - 1803–1804: Robert Liston (special mission)
- 1805–1807: Benjamin Garlike
- 1807: Brook Taylor ad interim
- 1807: Francis James Jackson ad interim
- 1807: Anthony Merry
- 1807–1814: No diplomatic relations
- 1813: Alexander Hope and Edward Thornton Plenipotentiaries
- 1813–1814: Edward Thornton Plenipotentiary
- 1814–1824: Augustus Foster
- 1824–1853: Henry Watkin Williams-Wynn
- 1852–1853: Henry Holroyd, 3rd Earl of Sheffield (attaché)
- 1858: Sir Henry Elliot-Murray-Kynynmound
- 1859–1866: Augustus Paget
- 1863: John Wodehouse, 3rd Baron Wodehouse
- 1866–1869: Hugh MacDonell
- 1881–1884: Hon. Hussey Vivian
- 1884–1888: Hon. Edmund Monson
- 1888–1893: Hugh MacDonell
- 1893–1898: Sir Charles Stewart Scott
- 1898–1900: Edmund Fane
- 1900–1905: Edward Goschen
- 1905–1910: Hon. Sir Alan Johnstone
- 1910–1912: Conyngham Greene
- 1913–1916: Sir Henry Lowther
- 1916–1918: Ralph Spencer Paget
- 1919–1921: Sir Charles Marling
- 1921–1926: Granville Leveson-Gower, 3rd Earl Granville
- 1926–1928: Sir Milne Cheetham
- 1928–1933: Thomas Hohler
- 1933–1935: Hugh Gurney
- 1935–1939: Hon. Sir Patrick Ramsay
- 1939–1940: Charles Howard Smith (expelled with his staff by the Germans on 9 April 1940)
- 1945–1947: Sir Alec Randall

=== Ambassadors ===
- 1947–1952: Sir Alec Randall
- 1952–1956: Sir Eric Berthoud
- 1956–1960: Sir Roderick Barclay
- 1960–1962: Sir William Montagu-Pollock
- 1962–1966: Sir John Henniker-Major
- 1966–1969: Oliver Wright
- 1969–1971: Sir Murray MacLehose
- 1971–1976: Sir Andrew Stark
- 1976–1983: Dame Anne Warburton
- 1983–1986: Sir James Mellon
- 1986–1988: Peter Unwin
- 1989–1993: Nigel Williams
- 1993–1996: Hugh James Arbuthnott
- 1996-1999: Andrew Philip Foley Bache
- 1999–2003: Philip Astley
- 2003–2006: Sir Nicholas Browne
- 2006–2008: David Frost
- 2008–2012: Nick Archer
- 2012–2016: Vivien Life
- 2016–2020: Dominic Schroeder
- 2020–2024: Emma Hopkins
- 2024–2026 : Joëlle Jenny
- 2026–present : Victoria Billing OBE
