= List of ambassadors of the United Kingdom to Ivory Coast =

The ambassador of the United Kingdom to Côte d'Ivoire is the United Kingdom's foremost diplomatic representative to the Ivory Coast, and head of the UK's diplomatic mission in Abidjan.

The British embassy in Abidjan was closed in 2005 because of the worsening security situation and the mission to Ivory Coast was temporarily operated out of the embassy in neighbouring Ghana. The embassy in Abidjan was reopened in May 2012.

== List of heads of mission ==
=== Ambassadors extraordinary and plenipotentiary ===
- 1960–1964: Thomas Ravensdale (also to Dahomey, Niger and Upper Volta)
- 1964–1967: Thomas Shaw (also to Niger and Upper Volta, and to Dahomey 1964–65)
- 1967–1970: Dudley Cheke (also to Niger and Upper Volta)
- 1970–1972: Peter Murray (also to Niger and Upper Volta)
- 1972–1975: Paul Holmer (also to Niger and Upper Volta)
- 1975–1978: Joe Wright (also to Niger and Upper Volta)
- 1978–1983: Michael Daly (also to Niger and Upper Volta)
- 1983–1987: John Willson (also to Burkina (formerly Upper Volta) and Niger)
- 1987–1990: Veronica Sutherland
- 1990–1997: Margaret Rothwell (also to Niger, Burkina and Liberia)
- 1997–2001: Haydon Warren-Gash (also to Niger, Burkina Faso and Liberia)
- 2001–2004: Francois Gordon
- 2004–2006: David Coates
- 2006–2007: Gordon Wetherell (non-resident)
- 2007–2011: Nicholas James Westcott (non-resident)
- 2012–2014: Simon Tonge
- 2014–2016: Mark Bensberg
- 2016–2020: Josephine Gauld
- 2020–2025: Catherine Brooker
- 2025–present: John Marshall
