= Dudley Cosby, 1st Baron Sydney =

Anglo-Irish politician and diplomat

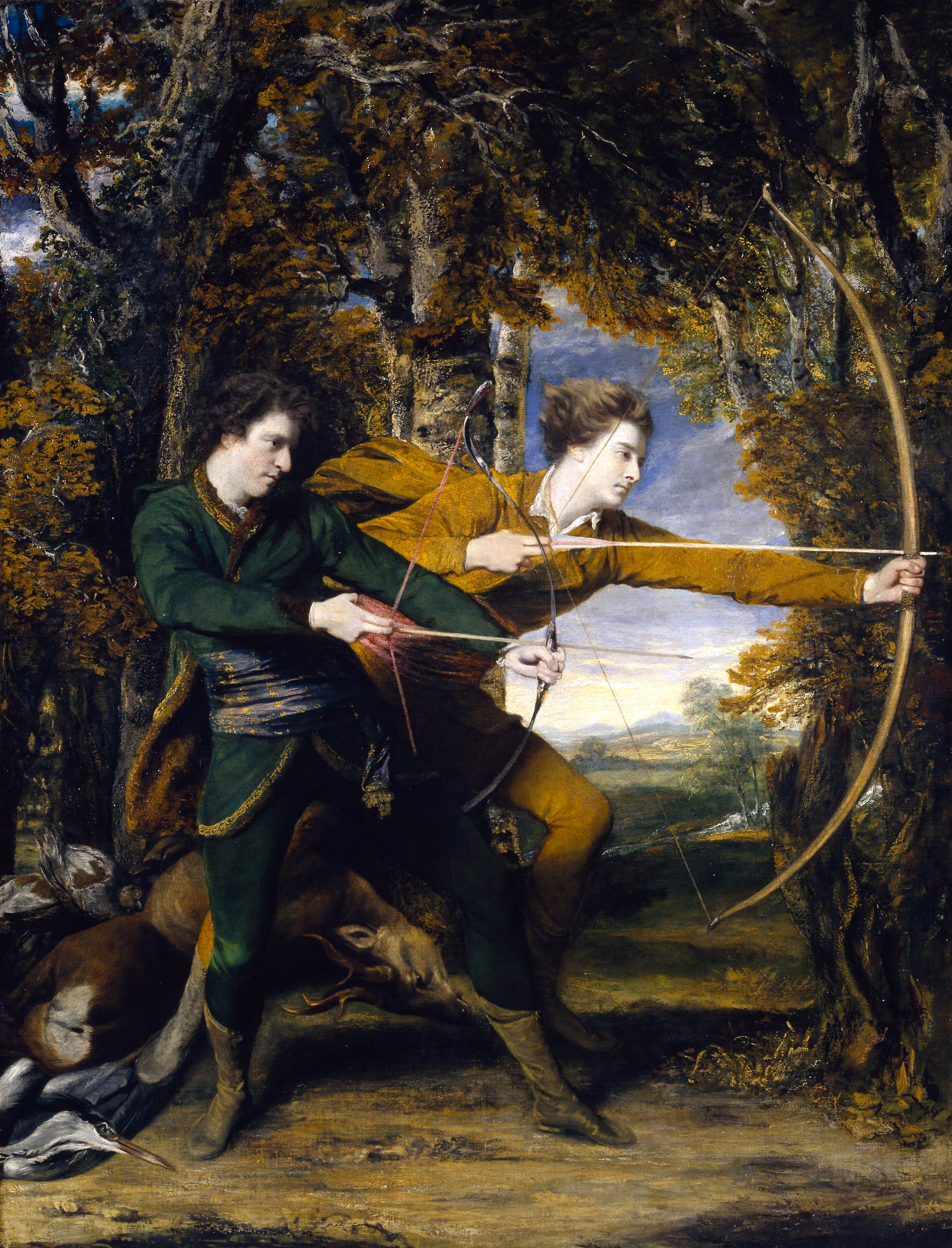
Colonel Acland and Lord Sydney: The Archers by Sir Joshua Reynolds. Lord Sydney to the left.

Dudley Alexander Sydney Cosby, 1st Baron Sydney (c. 1730 – 22 January 1774) was an Irish politician and diplomat.

== Background ==
Cosby was the son of Pole Cosby, of Stradbally, Queen's County, and Mary, daughter of Henry Dodwell. Dudley Cosby was his grandfather.

== Political and diplomatic career ==
Cosby was elected to the Irish House of Commons as one of two representatives for Carrick in 1763, a seat he held until 1768. In 1763 he was also appointed Minister Resident to Denmark, where he was to assist the aged Envoy Extraordinary, Walter Titley. He arrived in Copenhagen in February 1764, but returned to Britain already the following year. In 1768 he was elevated to the Peerage of Ireland as Lord Sydney, of Leix, Baron Stradbally.

== Family ==
Lord Sydney married Lady Isabella, daughter of Thomas St Lawrence, 1st Earl of Howth and Isabella King, in December 1773. He died in January the following year, when the barony became extinct. Lady Sydney died in October 1836.

Parliament of Ireland
Preceded by St George St George; Robert French	Member of Parliament for Carrick; 1763–1768; With: Robert French	Succeeded by Henry Sandford; Robert Clements
Diplomatic posts
Preceded by Walter Titley	Minister Resident to Denmark (Walter Titley was Envoy Extraordinary during the time); 1763–1765	Succeeded by Walter Titley
Peerage of Ireland
New creation	Baron Sydney; 1768–1774	Extinct
