= Veronica Sutherland =

British career diplomat

Dame Veronica Sutherland DBE CMG

President of Lucy Cavendish College, Cambridge
- In office 2001–2008
- Preceded by: Pauline Perry, Baroness Perry of Southwark
- Succeeded by: Janet Todd OBE

Personal details
- Born: Veronica Evelyn Beckett; 25 April 1939 (age 86)

Dame Veronica Evelyn Sutherland, DBE, CMG (née Beckett; born 25 April 1939) is a former British career diplomat who served in the Diplomatic Service of the United Kingdom from 1965 until 1999, including a stint as Ambassador to Ireland. After retirement, she was appointed President of the Lucy Cavendish College, Cambridge from 2001 until 2008.

== Background ==
Born to Lt Col Maurice Beckett and Constance Cavenagh-Mainwaring, Sutherland spent more than thirty years in the Diplomatic Service in mainland Europe, Africa and Asia, serving as Ambassador in three countries in francophone West Africa as well as British delegate to UNESCO.

After Sutherland's service in Ireland, she was appointed Commonwealth Deputy Secretary-General with responsibility for economic and social affairs. She was the first woman to hold such a high ranking Commonwealth post. She took up her Commonwealth post in February 1999, succeeding Sir Humphrey Maud, KCMG, who was retiring.

She was appointed CMG in the 1988 Birthday Honours and DBE in the 1998 Birthday Honours.

Diplomatic posts
Preceded by John Willson	British Ambassador to Ivory Coast; 1987–1990	Succeeded by Margaret Rothwell
Preceded by Sir David Blatherwick	British Ambassador to Ireland; 1995–1999	Succeeded by Sir Ivor Roberts
Academic offices
Preceded by Pauline Perry, Baroness Perry of Southwark	President of Lucy Cavendish College, Cambridge; 2001–2008	Succeeded by Janet Todd OBE
