= John Willson =

John Willson may refer to:

- John Willson (politician) (1776–1860), judge and political figure in Upper Canada
- John Willson (diplomat) (1931–2013), British diplomat

== See also ==
- John Wilson (disambiguation)
