= Anne Warburton =

British diplomat (1927–2015)

Dame Anne Warburton DCVO CMG

President of Lucy Cavendish College, Cambridge
- In office 1985–1994
- Preceded by: Phyllis Hetzel
- Succeeded by: Pauline Perry, Baroness Perry of Southwark

Permanent Representative to the WTO and UN in Geneva
- In office 1983–1985
- Monarch: Elizabeth II
- Prime Minister: Margaret Thatcher
- Preceded by: Sir Peter Marshall
- Succeeded by: John Sankey

British Ambassador to Denmark
- In office 1976–1983
- Preceded by: Sir Andrew Stark
- Succeeded by: Sir James Mellon

Personal details
- Born: Anne Marion Warburton; 8 June 1927 London, England
- Died: 4 June 2015 (aged 87) Eye, Suffolk, England
- Education: Barnard College; Somerville College, Oxford
- Occupation: British diplomat

Dame Anne Warburton DCVO CMG (8 June 1927 – 4 June 2015) was a British diplomat who was the first female British ambassador. She served as British Ambassador to Denmark from 1976 to 1983 and British Permanent Representative to the United Nations in Geneva from 1983 to 1985. Having retired from her diplomatic career, she was President of Lucy Cavendish College, Cambridge from 1985 to 1994.

== Career ==
Anne Marion Warburton was educated at Barnard College, Columbia University, and Somerville College, Oxford. She worked at the London office of the Economic Cooperation Administration (1949–1952), at the NATO Secretariat, then located in Paris (1952–1954) and for Lazard Brothers in London (1955–1957). In 1958, she entered the Diplomatic Service in Branch A (the senior branch) and, after two years at the Foreign Office, was posted to the UK Mission to the United Nations at New York City (1959–1962) during which she was promoted to First Secretary. She served at the British embassy at Bonn (1962–1965) and then in the newly created Diplomatic Service Administration Office in London (1965–1967). She then moved back to the Foreign Office, which became the Foreign and Commonwealth Office (FCO) in 1968, until 1970 when she was posted as Counsellor to the UK's Geneva Mission to the United Nations. After a further period at the FCO as head of the Guidance and Information Policy Department (1975–1976), she was appointed British Ambassador to Denmark in April 1976 and remained there until 1983.

Warburton was the first female British ambassador. Although Barbara Salt had been appointed ambassador-designate to Israel in 1962, she was unable to proceed to Tel Aviv because of a serious illness and so did not take up the post. Eleanor Emery was British High Commissioner to Botswana from 1973 to 1977, corresponding to an ambassador but within the Commonwealth.

After leaving Denmark, Warburton was ambassador and UK permanent representative to the United Nations and other international organisations in Geneva (1983–1985). She was deputy leader of the UK delegation to the third UN World Conference on Women at Nairobi in July 1985, which closed the United Nations Decade for Women. She retired from the Diplomatic Service and was president of Lucy Cavendish College, Cambridge (1985–1994). Concurrently, she was a member of the Equal Opportunities Commission (1986–1988), of the Committee on Standards in Public Life (1994–1997), and of the Council of the University of East Anglia.

Warburton led a European Community investigative mission into the treatment of Muslim women in the former Yugoslavia, which reported in January 1993.

She died on 4 June 2015 at her home near Eye, Suffolk, and is buried in the nearby churchyard of St Mary's in Thornham Parva.

== Publications ==
- Paying for NATO : how common finance can help the defence of the West (with John B. Wood), Friends of Atlantic Union, London, 1956
- Signposts to Denmark, Hernov, Copenhagen, 1992. (ISBN 8759022086)

== Honours ==
Anne Warburton was appointed CVO in 1965 and CMG in 1977. She was made Dame Commander of the Royal Victorian Order in 1979.

She was an Honorary Fellow of her alma mater, Somerville College, Oxford, and of Lucy Cavendish College, Cambridge. Columbia University awarded her a Barnard Medal of Distinction. The West German government awarded her the Verdienstkreuz (Merit Cross), 1st Class, in 1965 for her service at Bonn. She also held the Grand Cross of the Order of the Dannebrog (Denmark) and the Lazo de Dama (Dame's Ribbon) of the Order of Isabella the Catholic (Spain).

Diplomatic posts
Preceded by Sir Andrew Stark	Ambassador Extraordinary and Plenipotentiary to the Kingdom of Denmark; 1976–1983	Succeeded by Sir James Mellon
Preceded by Sir Peter Marshall	Permanent Representative to the United Nations and Other International Organisations in Geneva; 1983–1985	Succeeded by John Sankey
Academic offices
Preceded by Phyllis Hetzel	President of Lucy Cavendish College, Cambridge; 1985 to 1994	Succeeded by Pauline Perry, Baroness Perry of Southwark
