= Alec Randall =

British diplomat (1892–1977)

Sir Alec Randall KCMG OBE

British Ambassador to Denmark
- In office 1947–1952
- Preceded by: Post established
- Succeeded by: Sir Eric Berthoud

Personal details
- Born: 27 July 1892
- Died: 4 August 1977 (aged 85)
- Children: 4
- Education: University College London
- Occupation: Diplomat

Sir Alec Walter George Randall (27 July 1892 – 4 August 1977) was a British diplomat who served as British Ambassador to Denmark from 1947 to 1952.

== Early life and education ==
Randall was born on 27 July 1892, the son of George and Clara Randall. He was educated at Queen Elizabeth's Grammar School, Barnet, and University College London where he took a BA in English.

== Career ==
Randall entered the Foreign Office in 1920 as third secretary after teaching in Germany before the War. From 1925 to 1930, he served as second secretary with the British Legation to the Holy See, and from 1930 to 1933, as first secretary to the British Legation in Bucharest. After a period in the Foreign Office from 1933 to 1935, he was sent on his first posting to Denmark as first secretary at the British Legation in Copenhagen, serving from 1935 to 1938. During World War II, he worked at the Foreign Office as acting counsellor and head of the department which handled League of Nations matters, and as head of the Refugee Department. In 1945, he returned to Denmark as minister, and in 1947 was appointed Ambassador to Denmark, remaining in the post until 1952.

After retiring from the Diplomatic Service in 1953, Randall served as Alternate Delegate for economic affairs at the UN Assembly and at the Economic and Social Council, in New York and Geneva from 1953 to 1957.

== Personal life and death ==
Randall married Dr Amy Jones in 1915 and they had a son and three daughters. She died in 1966.

Randall died on 4 August 1977, aged 85.

== Publications ==
- Vatican Assignment (1956)
- Discovering Rome (1960)
- The Pope, the Jews and the Nazis (1963)

== Honours ==
Randall was appointed Companion of the Order of St Michael and St George (CMG) in the 1944 Birthday Honours, and promoted to Knight Commander (KCMG) in the 1949 New Year Honours. He was appointed an Officer of the Order of the British Empire (OBE) in 1920 for services in connection with the War. In 1946, he was awarded the Grand Cross of the Order of the Dannebrog by Denmark.

== See also ==
- Denmark–United Kingdom relations

Diplomatic posts
New office	British Ambassador to Denmark; 1947–1952	Succeeded by Sir Eric Berthoud
