= Anna McClean Bidder =

English zoologist and academic

President of Lucy Cavendish College, Cambridge
- In office 1965–1970
- Succeeded by: Kate Bertram

Personal details
- Born: 4 May 1903
- Died: 1 October 2001 (aged 98)

Anna McClean Bidder (4 May 1903 – 1 October 2001) was an English zoologist and academic. She was co-founder and first President of Lucy Cavendish College, Cambridge.

== Early life and education ==
Anna Bidder was born in Cambridge. Her father, George Parker Bidder III, a zoologist, was president of the Marine Biological Association of the United Kingdom, and grandson of the noted engineer and calculating prodigy also named George Parker Bidder. Her mother, Marion Bidder, had been a pioneering woman student before teaching physiology and botany at Girton and Newnham colleges.

Bidder was educated at the Perse School for Girls, and then went on to study Zoology for a year at University College, London. She returned to Cambridge in 1922 to read Natural Sciences at Newnham College. Her elder sister had chosen to study at Girton, the only other women's college in Cambridge at the time, and their mother wished to send one daughter to each. Bidder changed her subject to Zoology partway through her studies, and graduated in 1926.

Bidder obtained her Ph.D. from Cambridge in 1933.

== Career ==
She published several academic papers in her career as a zoologist, and worked for a time in Basel. In 1950 or 1951, she and two friends, Kathleen Wood-Legh and Margaret Braithwaite, formed the "Dining Group" for female academics in Cambridge who were not Fellows at colleges. As well as social gatherings, they had the eventual aim of attracting a core of academics to establish a new female graduate college. This group continued for fourteen years, meeting first in the Copper Kettle restaurant and other restaurants around Cambridge, then later in Gonville and Caius College's Harvey Court.

This led eventually to the founding of the Lucy Cavendish Collegiate Society for mature female students in 1965. Bidder was President of the college from its foundation until her retirement in 1970.

Her Quaker beliefs led to her involvement in the publication of the somewhat controversial 1963 pamphlet, Towards a Quaker View of Sex, which aimed to take a new view of the changing sexual mores of the time.

Academic offices
New title	President of Lucy Cavendish College, Cambridge; 1965–1970	Succeeded by Kate Bertram
