= Kate Bertram =

British biologist

Kate Bertram JP

President of Lucy Cavendish College, Cambridge
- In office 1970–1979
- Preceded by: Anna McClean Bidder
- Succeeded by: Phyllis Hetzel

Personal details
- Born: 8 July 1912
- Died: 6 July 1999 (aged 86)
- Spouse: Colin Bertram
- Education: Hayes Court, Kent and Newnham College, University of Cambridge

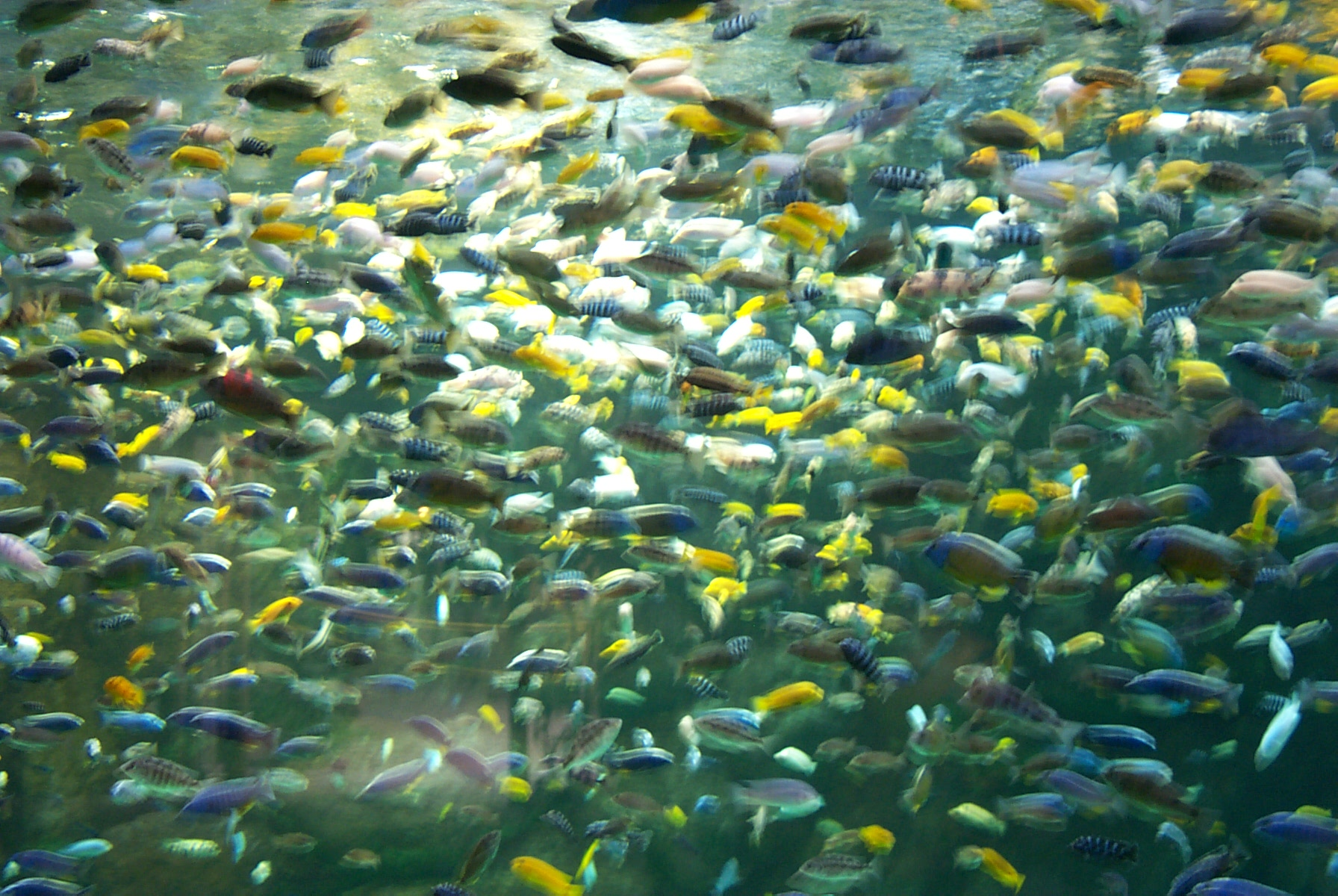
Bertram's 1942 report included the cichlids of Lake Nyasa (now Lake Malawi). This collection is in Toronto Zoo.

Cicely Kate Bertram, JP (née Ricardo; 8 July 1912 – 6 July 1999) was a British academic specialising in East African and Palestinian fisheries, and working with her husband Colin Bertram on sirenea. Part of the 1930s "Cambridge school" of biologists, she contributed to two seminal reports on freshwater fish in eastern Africa.

== Early life and education ==
Bertram was born in London to Sir Harry Ricardo and Beatrice Hale in 1912. She attended Newnham College, Cambridge.

In 1939, she married Colin Bertram, British marine zoologist, with whom she had four sons.

== Career ==
After the second world war, Bertram returned to Cambridge, where she taught at Newnham College and Girton College, which, at the time, were the only colleges which admitted women to the University of Cambridge. While at the university, she was a member of the "Dining Group", who helped establish New Hall (now Murray Edwards College) in 1954, a college for women whose careers and education had been interrupted by family responsibilities.

=== Lucy Cavendish College ===
In 1965, Lucy Cavendish College was founded; Bertram became the first Tutor and Secretary to the Governing body. In 1970, Bertram became the second ever President of Lucy Cavendish College, University of Cambridge, a position she held until her retirement in 1979. She was an honorary fellow of the college from 1982-1999. Later in life, Bertram suffered Alzheimer's, and died in Graffham, Sussex 6 July 1999.

The Kate Bertram Prize is awarded at Lucy Cavendish College, Cambridge, to students receiving First Class results in non-tripos examinations.

Bertram also had an extensive fieldwork career with her husband, travelling to Australia, Papua New Guinea, Sri Lanka, Belize and the Guianas to study manatees and dugongs. From 1962 to 1977, they published almost two dozen scientific articles and books, including in Nature, on the ecology, economic uses, and conservation of sirenians. The IUCN/SSC Sirenia Specialist Group was created largely as a result of their data collection on sirenia distribution and status.

Bertram served as a Justice of the Peace in Cambridgeshire, eastern England, for twenty years.

== Publications ==
- Ricardo, C.K. n.d. (1939). Report on the Fish and Fisheries of Lake Rukwa in Tanganyika Territory and the Bangweulu Region in Northern Rhodesia. London: Crown Agents for the Colonies.
- Bertram, C.K., Borley, H.J.H. & Trewavas, E. (1942). Report on the Fish and Fisheries of Lake Nyasa. London: Crown Agents for the Colonies. Known as the 1939 Survey.
- C. Kate Bertram (1989). Lucy Cavendish College: A history of the early years.
- Bertram, C. Kate & Janet Trant (1991). Ion Trant. (Ed). Letters from the Swamps. Graffham, Sussex: Dr C.K. Bertram.
- C.K. Ricardo Bertram (1944). "Abridged Report on The Fish and Fishery of Lake Tiberias" Haifa: Palestine Department of Agriculture and Fisheries.

Academic offices
Preceded by Anna Bidder	President of Lucy Cavendish College, Cambridge; 1970–1979	Succeeded by Phyllis Hetzel
