= Andrew Stark (diplomat) =

British diplomat (1916–2006)

Sir Andrew Stark KCMG CVO

British Ambassador to Denmark
- In office 1971–1976
- Preceded by: Sir Murray MacLehose
- Succeeded by: Dame Anne Warburton

Personal details
- Born: 30 December 1916 Fauldhouse, Scotland
- Died: 3 April 2006 (aged 89) White Notley, England
- Spouse: Rosemary Parker
- Children: Three sons
- Education: University of Edinburgh
- Occupation: Diplomat

Military service
- Allegiance: United Kingdom
- Branch/service: British Army
- Years of service: 1940–1948
- Rank: Captain
- Unit: Green Howards; Intelligence Corps
- Battles/wars: Second World War

Sir Andrew Alexander Steel Stark KCMG CVO (30 December 1916 – 3 April 2006) was a British diplomat.

== Early life and military service ==
He was educated at Bathgate Academy and the University of Edinburgh. This included a semester at the University of Heidelberg studying German. He then worked as an English teacher in Edinburgh between 1937 and 1939. After training with the 166th Officer Cadet Training Unit, Stark commissioned into the Green Howards on 9 November 1940. He served throughout the Second World War, latterly on the staff of Dwight D. Eisenhower as a German-speaking intelligence officer having transferred to the Intelligence Corps.

In 1944 he married Rosemary Parker and together they had three sons. In 1948 he was demobilised and joined HM Diplomatic Service.

== Diplomatic career ==
Stark worked as Assistant Private Secretary to Anthony Eden, the Foreign Secretary, from 1953 to 1955. He then held diplomatic posts in Vienna, Belgrade, Rome and Bonn. He was invested as a Companion of the Order of St Michael and St George in 1964 and as a Commander of the Royal Victorian Order in 1965. In 1968, Stark was appointed, with ambassadorial rank, to the British Delegation to the United Nations and in the Seven Nation Committee working for the reform and reorganisation of the UN. He then served on the staff of the UN for three years from 1968 to 1971, as Deputy Secretary-General (Administration). That year he became British Ambassador to Denmark, serving in the role until 1976. In 1975 he was elevated as a Knight Commander of the Order of St Michael and St George. Between 1976 and his retirement two years later Stark was Deputy Under-Secretary of State at the Foreign and Commonwealth Office.

== Later life ==
After leaving the FCO, Stark was invited by Mærsk Mc-Kinney Møller to be chairman of Maersk's UK subsidiary, a position he held until 1987. From 1983 to 1995 he was chairman of the Anglo-Danish Society and then served as the Society's honorary president until his death. Stark was Pro-Chancellor of the University of Essex from 1983 to 1995.

== Arms ==
Coat of arms of Andrew Stark
Notes Granted on 6 September 1976 by Garter Wagner and Clarenceux Walker. Crest A demi-unicorn Argent its dexter hoof resting upon a clarion Or. Escutcheon Gules on a cross formy throughout Argent a cross Gules quarter pierced. Motto Inspirabit Spes

Diplomatic posts
Preceded by Sir Murray MacLehose	British Ambassador to Denmark; 1971–1976	Succeeded by Dame Anne Warburton
