= David Coates (diplomat) =

British diplomat

Ambassador of the United Kingdom to Ivory Coast
- In office 2004–2006

Director General of the British Trade & Cultural Office in Taipei
- In office 1999–2002

Personal details
- Born: 13 November 1947 (age 78)
- Education: University of Bristol; National Taiwan University
- Occupation: diplomat

David Coates (born 13 November 1947) is a retired British diplomat and former Ambassador to Ivory Coast and Director General of the British Trade & Cultural Office (BTCO) in Taipei.

== Education and career ==
Coates was educated at the History Department, University of Bristol, then he studied Mandarin at the Stanford Center of National Taiwan University from 1972 to 1973, and taught in Taiwanese cram schools.

After joining the Foreign and Commonwealth Office (FCO), Coates worked at the British Embassy Beijing as First Secretary (Commercial), from 1989 to 1992 he was assigned to Beijing again, as Counsellor (Political) and Deputy Chief of Mission. After returning to London, he served as the Head of Joint Assistance Unit (Central and Eastern Europe) from 1993 to 1995. and was promoted to the Head of Far East and Pacific Department (1995–98). In 1999, he went to Taipei to take the post of Director General BTCO in succession of Alan Stanley Collins, who was appointed as British Ambassador to the Philippines. Leaving his post in Taiwan in 2002, Coates served as the FCO's estate modernisation manager until 2004. and served as the ambassador to Ivory Coast from 2004 to 2006. After retiring from the foreign service, Coates became a research fellow of Taiwan Studies at the University of Oxford, and a visiting professor at the Graduate Institute of European Studies, Tamkang University, Taiwan.

Diplomatic posts
Preceded by Graham Fry	Head of Far East and Pacific Department, FCO; 1995－1998	Succeeded by David Warren
Preceded by Alan Collins	Director General of British Trade & Cultural Office (BTCO), Taipei; 1999－2002	Succeeded by Derek Marsh
Preceded by Francois Gordon	Ambassador of the United Kingdom to Ivory Coast; 2004－2006	Succeeded by Gordon Wetherell
