= Colonel Acland and Lord Sydney: The Archers =

Painting by Joshua Reynolds

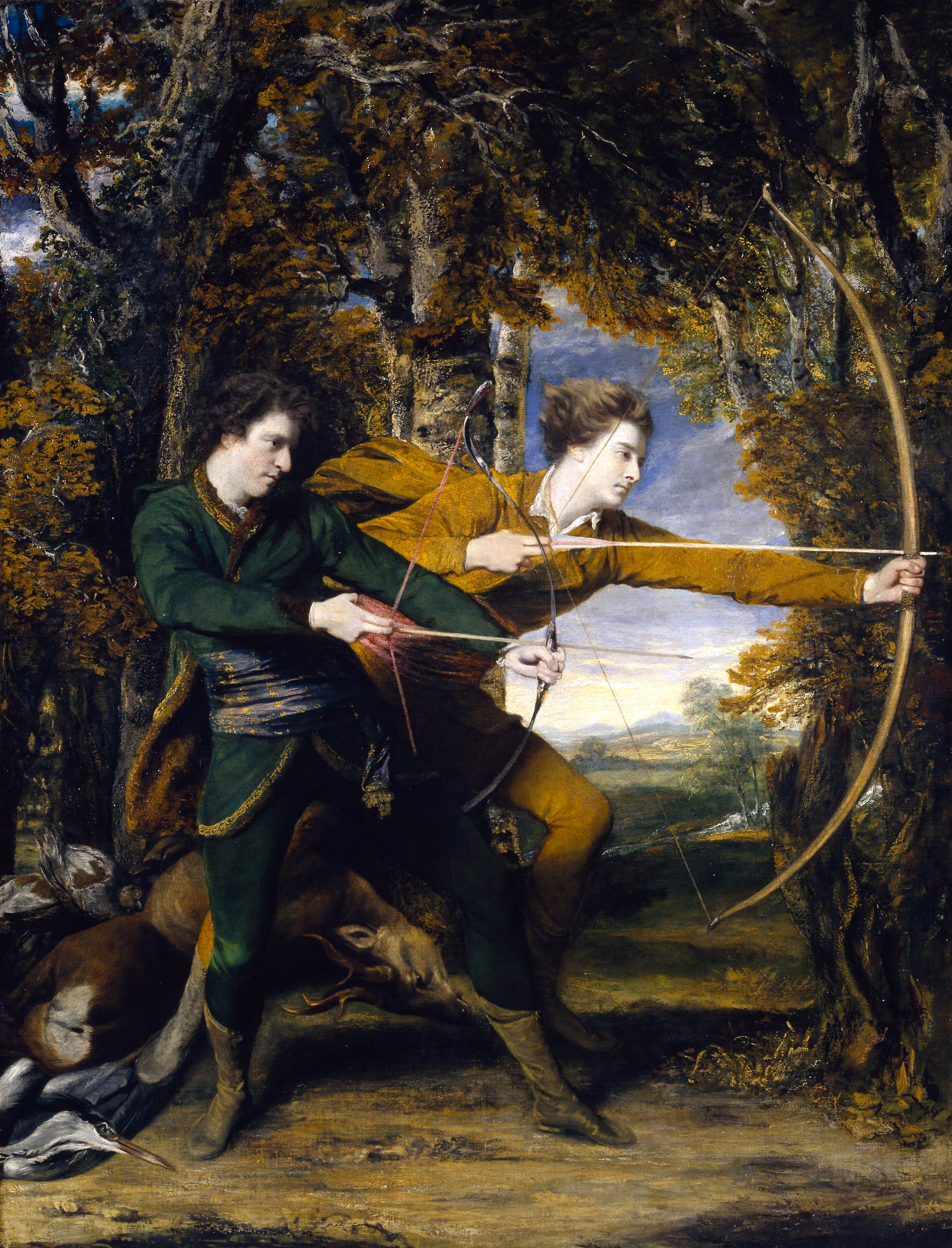
- Artist: Sir Joshua Reynolds
- Year: 1769–1770
- Medium: Oil on canvas
- Dimensions: 238.7 cm × 184.2 cm (94.0 in × 72.5 in)
- Location: Tate Britain; London

Colonel Acland and Lord Sydney: The Archers is an oil-on-canvas painting by Sir Joshua Reynolds which was painted between 1769 and 1770. The artwork depicts two gentlemen, Colonel John Dyke Acland on the right and Lord Sydney on the left. Reynolds began the work in 1769, and completed it the next year. In 1769 Reynolds had become the first president of the new Royal Academy. in 1770 the painting was displayed at the Royal Academy's Summer Exhibition. In September 2005, the Tate purchased the painting for more than £2.5 million, equivalent to US$4.4 million.

== Analysis ==
The work portrays the two men holding each a bow, while the shotgun was the more popular choice of weapon at the time.^{[a]} These two bow-wielding men can be seen in the clearing of a forest. They are both garbed in archer clothing; their hunted prey lies close to their feet. Their facial expressions, coupled with Sydney's eagerness and poise, suggest that they are both preparing to loose an arrow at an approaching animal. Distantly in the background, a river, a clump of trees, and a meadow can be seen. Further back, at the skyline mountain peaks can be seen below thick grey clouds.

The portrait shares the same textural schemes and design of several other works by Reynolds. The allusion to the classical era is apparent in both the clothing worn by the two aristocrats, and their choice of weapon.

== Notes ==
a. However, the use of the bow for recreational use was, at the time, coming back into revival, and so this may not have been too uncommon when Reynolds created the work.
