= Phyllis Hetzel =

British civil servant

President of Lucy Cavendish College, Cambridge
- In office 1979–1984
- Preceded by: Kate Bertram
- Succeeded by: Dame Anne Warburton

Personal details
- Born: 10 June 1918
- Died: 6 January 2011 (aged 92)

Phyllis Bertha Mabel Hetzel (10 June 1918 – 6 January 2011) was a British civil servant and university administrator. Her early career was in the civil service, serving in the Board of Trade, Department of Economic Affairs, Ministry of Technology, and the Department of Trade and Industry. She then began a second career in university administration, and served as President of Lucy Cavendish College, Cambridge from 1979 to 1984.

Academic offices
Preceded by Kate Bertram	President of Lucy Cavendish College, Cambridge; 1979 to 1984	Succeeded by Dame Anne Warburton
