= John Gordon Doubleday =

British diplomat

- Born: 27 November 1920
- Died: 27 April 1982 (aged 61)
- Occupation: British diplomat

John Gordon Doubleday OBE (27 November 1920 – 27 April 1982) was a British diplomat who was ambassador to Liberia.

== Biography ==
Doubleday was educated at Bedford School and at St John's College, Cambridge. After service in the Royal Air Force during the Second World War, and then service in the Colonial Administrative Service in Northern Rhodesia between 1949 and 1965, he entered the British Diplomatic Service in 1965. He was Deputy High Commissioner to the Bahamas between 1973 and 1976 and to Sri Lanka between 1976 and 1978, before serving as Ambassador to Liberia between 1978 and 1980. He was appointed OBE in the 1975 Birthday Honours.

Diplomatic posts
Preceded by John Reiss	British Ambassador to Liberia; 1978–1980	Succeeded by Dougal Reid
