= Benjamin Garlike =

British diplomat

Benjamin Garlike (c. 1766 – 14 May 1815, Albany, London) was a British diplomat, ambassador to Denmark and Prussia.

As a young man Garlike received the patronage of Lord Auckland, accompanying him to Spain in 1788 and The Hague in 1789, where (despite lacking official government appointment) he worked deciphering government dispatches. In 1793 he accompanied Lord Henry Spencer to Stockholm, working as Secretary of Legation until December 1794, when he was appointed Chargé d'affaires at the Court of Stockholm. In July 1796 he was appointed Secretary of Legation at the Court of Berlin, and Chargé d'affaires to the Prussian Court in 1798 and 1799–1800, In May 1801, on the death of Paul I of Russia, he was appointed Chargé d'affaires, and shortly thereafter Minister Plenipotentiary, to St Petersburg. In 1803 he was appointed to, but did not take up, the post of Envoy Extraordinary to the Court of Saxony. In 1804 he became ambassador to the Court of Denmark. In 1807 he was briefly appointed ambassador to the Court of Berlin., leaving in December 1807 when Britain suspended diplomatic relations with Prussia. It has been claimed that he later served as Envoy at Constantinople.

Garlike evidently had literary inclinations, and was admitted to the honorary degree of Doctor of Civil Law at Oxford University on 6 July 1810. A friend of William Cobbett in the 1780s, he had advised Cobbett, in memorable terms, to master the world through proper study of English grammar:

Now then, my dear Bill, it is for you to determine whether you shall all your life yield an abject submission to others, or whether you yourself shall be a guide and leader of men. Nature has done her part towards you most generously, but her favour will be of no use without a knowledge of grammar. Without that knowledge you will be laughed at by blockheads: with it, you may laugh at thousands who think themselves learned men.
