= Janet Todd =

British academic (born 1942)

Janet Todd OBE

President of Lucy Cavendish College, Cambridge
- In office October 2008 – October 2015
- Preceded by: Dame Veronica Sutherland
- Succeeded by: Jackie Ashley

Personal details
- Born: Janet Margaret Todd; 10 September 1942 (age 84)
- Children: Julian Todd; Clara Todd
- Education: Newnham College, Cambridge; University of Florida
- Occupation: Scholar of women in literature
- Website: www.janettodd.co.uk

Janet Margaret Todd OBE (born 10 September 1942), née Dakin, is a British academic and author. Much of her work concerns Mary Wollstonecraft, Jane Austen, and their circles.

== Early life ==
Janet Dakin was educated from 1961 at Newnham College, Cambridge. She then taught at Mfantsipim School and the University of Cape Coast, in Ghana. She married the American mathematician Aaron R. Todd, who had been teaching in Ghana in the Peace Corps, in her native Wales in 1966.

Janet and Aaron Todd then both took MSc courses at the University of Leeds, Janet's being in Linguistics. Janet Todd undertook a doctorate on the poet John Clare at the University of Florida, completed in 1971. Aaron Todd completed a mathematics doctorate there in 1972. He was subsequently in the mathematics department of Baruch College. The couple had a son and a daughter, and were divorced in 1984.

== Career ==
=== Academic career ===
Todd then worked at the University of Puerto Rico at Mayagüez, from 1972 to 1974; and then at Rutgers University 1974 to 1983, where she became a full professor, with three periods away as a visiting professor. She was a Fellow of Sidney Sussex College, Cambridge from 1983 to 1900.

From 1990 to 2000 Todd was professor at the University of East Anglia. She was appointed professor of English Literature at Glasgow University in 2000.

Todd was then at Aberdeen University from 2004 until she took up in 2008 the post of president of Lucy Cavendish College, Cambridge, from which she retired in 2015. She is now a full-time novelist and researcher living in Cambridge. She is an Honorary Fellow of Newnham College, Cambridge.

=== Author ===
Todd's writing concerns literature and culture of the Restoration and 18th and early 19th centuries. Over a long career, she has published more than 40 critical and biographical books and collections of essays, mainly on women authors, women's writing, cultural history and the development of fiction. She has edited full-scale editions of Mary Wollstonecraft (with Marilyn Butler) and Aphra Behn, as well as individual works of women such as Charlotte Smith, Helen Maria Williams, Mary Shelley, Mary Carleton and Eliza Fenwick.

She is the General Editor of the nine-volume The Cambridge Edition of the Works of Jane Austen, editor of the volume Jane Austen in Context, and co-editing Persuasion and Later Manuscripts and author of the Cambridge Introduction to Jane Austen. In the US she started the first journal devoted to women writers and more recently in the UK she has been the co-founder with Marie Mulvey-Roberts of Women's Writing.

Since retirement, she has revised her biography of Aphra Behn, Aphra Behn: A Secret Life, and published four novels: A Man of Genius, Don't You Know There's a War On?, Jane Austen and Shelley in the Garden, and an Austen spin-off, Lady Susan Plays the Game. In 2018, she published Radiation Diaries, her account of a month of cancer treatment, a frank, witty and scholarly memoir, and, in 2019, a revised, colour-illustrated edition of Jane Austen's unfinished work, Jane Austen's Sanditon with an Essay by Janet Todd.

== Honours ==
In the 2013 New Year Honours, Todd was appointed an Officer of the Order of the British Empire (OBE) "for services to higher education and literary scholarship".

== Selected publications ==
- Anthology of British Women Writers: From the Middle Ages to the Present Day. Pandora Press, 1989. ISBN 9780863582677. Co-edited with Dale Spender.
- The Secret Life of Aphra Behn. André Deutsch. 1996. ISBN 0-8135-2455-5.
- Mary Wollstonecraft : A Revolutionary Life. London: Weidenfeld and Nicolson. 2000. ISBN 0-231-12184-9.
- The Complete Letters of Mary Wollstonecraft. Columbia University Press. 2004. ISBN 0-7139-9600-5.
- Daughters of Ireland. New York: Ballantine Books. 2004. ISBN 0-345-44763-8. Published as Rebel Daughters: Ireland in Conflict in the US.
- The Cambridge Introduction to Jane Austen. Cambridge: Cambridge University Press. 2006. ISBN 978-0-521-67469-0.
- Death & the Maidens: Fanny Wollstonecraft and the Shelley Circle. London: Profile Books; Berkeley: Counterpoint. 2007. ISBN 978-1-58243-339-4.
- Later Manuscripts of Jane Austen. Cambridge: Cambridge University Press. 2009. ISBN 978-0-521-84348-5. Edited with Linda Bree.
- A Man of Genius, Bitter Lemon Press. 2016. ISBN 9781908524591.
- Aphra Behn: A Secret Life. Fentum Press. 16 May 2017. ISBN 9781909572065.
- Radiation Diaries. Fentum Press. 2018. ISBN 978-1909572171.
- Jane Austen's Sanditon with an Essay by Janet Todd. Fentum Press. 2019. ISBN 978-1909572218.
- Don't You Know There's a War On?. Fentum Press. 2020. ISBN 978-1909572072. EBook ISBN 978-1909572201.
- Jane Austen and Shelley in the Garden. Fentum Press. 2021. ISBN 978-1909572270. EBook ISBN 978-1909572287
- Contributor to Encounters with Jane Austen: Celebrating 250 Years. Aurora Metro Books. 2025.
- Living with Jane Austen. Cambridge University Press. 2025.

Academic offices
Preceded by Dame Veronica Sutherland	President of Lucy Cavendish College, Cambridge; 2008–2015	Succeeded by Jackie Ashley
