= Pauline Perry, Baroness Perry of Southwark =

British Conservative politician

The Right Honourable The Baroness Perry of Southwark
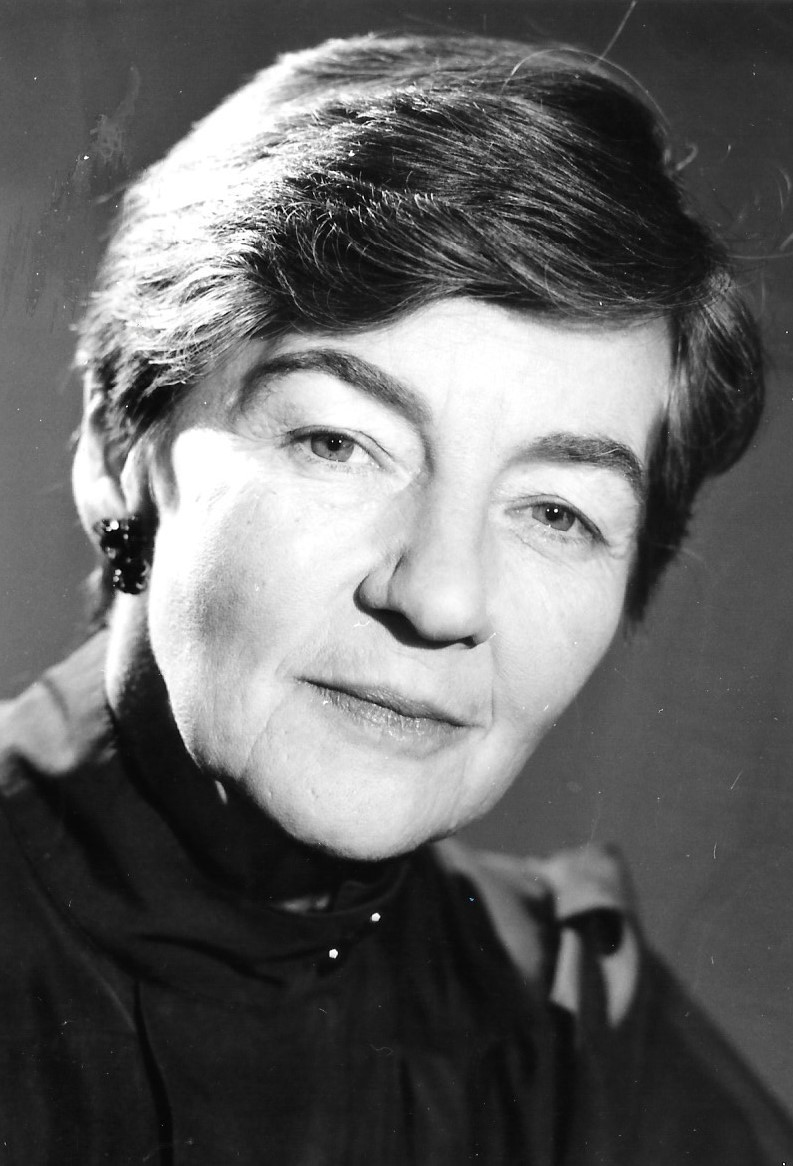

Member of the House of Lords
- Lord Temporal
- Life peerage 16 July 1991 – 26 May 2016

Personal details
- Born: Pauline Welch; 15 October 1931 (age 95)
- Party: Conservative Party
- Spouse: George Walter Perry (m. 1952)
- Occupation: Politician, University President

President of Lucy Cavendish College, Cambridge
- In office 1994–2001
- Preceded by: Dame Anne Warburton
- Succeeded by: Dame Veronica Sutherland

Pauline Perry, Baroness Perry of Southwark (née Welch; born 15 October 1931) is an educator, educationist, academic, and activist. She is a Conservative politician and was for 25 years a working member of the British House of Lords. In 1981 she became Her Majesty's Chief Inspector of Schools in England. In 1986 she became Vice-Chancellor of South Bank Polytechnic, and serving during its transition to a university, became the first woman in history to run a British university.

== Early life ==
Perry was educated at Wolverhampton Girls' High School and Girton College, Cambridge. where she read Moral Sciences (philosophy) and received her MA. For the next 10 years she taught philosophy, mainly at post-graduate level, teaching in England, Canada and the USA.

In 1952 she married Oxford University lecturer George Perry, and had three sons and a daughter (Christopher, Timothy, Simon and Hilary).

== Career ==
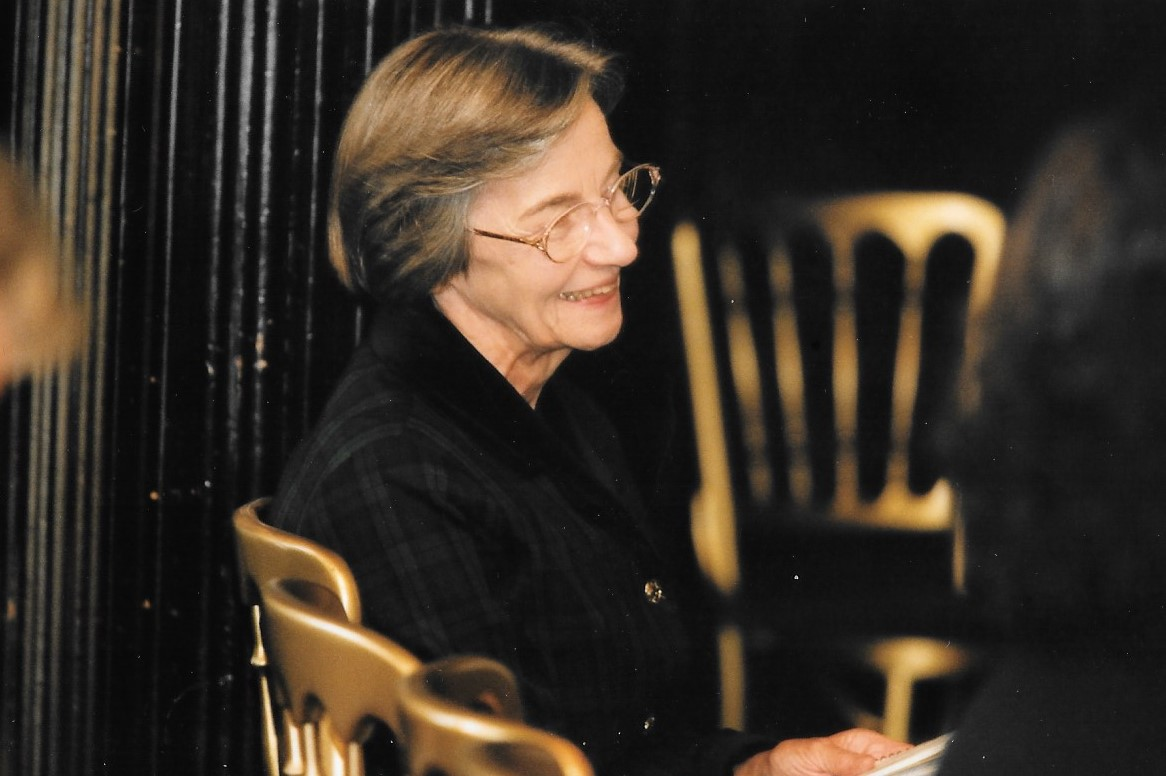
Baroness Perry of Southwark

In 1970, Perry joined HM Inspectorate at the Department of Education and Science, and was appointed Chief Inspector in 1981. In 1986 she became Vice-Chancellor and Chief Executive of South Bank Polytechnic, and serving during its transition to a university became the first woman in history to run a British university. In 1994 she was elected President of Lucy Cavendish College, Cambridge. and served as Head of House for 7 years until 2001. She subsequently held other roles including pro-chancellor of the University of Surrey 2001–2005, Chair of Governors at Roehampton Institute 2001–2005 (which was granted university status in 2003).

In 1986, she collaborated with John Cassels and James Prior to create the Council for Industry and Higher Education (CIHE), which would become the National Centre for Universities and Business in 2013.

She has also been active in the Southwark Cathedral and Church of England community and the City of London. She was appointed by General Synod as chair of the review group examining the operation of the Crown Appointment Commission, the body which nominates Diocesan Bishops. The Perry Report "Working with the Spirit", was published in May 2001 and led to more transparent selection procedures for the appointment of Anglican Bishops. She was Rector's Warden of Southwark Cathedral from 1990 to 1995.

Perry was awarded the Freedom of the City of London in 1991. She was a member of the Nuffield Council on Bioethics (2003–05), and chaired the Working Party on the Ethics of research involving animals. She has also served as Chair of the Commission on Secondary Reorganisation for the London Borough of Hammersmith and Fulham; Chair of the Commission on Academies and Free Schools in the London Borough of Wandsworth; Co-chair of The Conservatives Public Services Commission, which reported in 2007; and Chair of the Governing Body of Kaplan College and Law School, in 2013.

In 2018 the Furfure Educational Trust for Leadership (FETL) who a blog about women who shaped further education, and devoted a whole article to Baroness Pauline Perry, for all of her work with education entitled 100 years of women in FE and skills. A passion for opportunity: Pauline Perry

== UK Parliament ==
On 16 July 1991, she became a life peer as The Right Honourable Baroness Perry of Southwark, of Charlbury in the County of Oxfordshire. She sat on the Conservative Party benches. She was appointed a Conservative Party Whip in the Lords in January 2011. She retired from the Lords on 26 May 2016.

=== Parliamentary Committees ===
- Ecclesiastical Committee (Joint Committee) 2015–2016
- Liaison Committee (Lords) 2015–2016
- Hybrid Instruments Committee (Lords) 2014–16
- Science and Technology: Sub-Committee I 2010–2011
- Science and Technology Committee (Lords) 2009–14
- Liaison Committee (Lords) 2007–12
- Science and Technology: Sub-Committee I 2005–07
- Science and Technology Committee (Lords) 2003–07
- Committee on Religious Offences 2002–03
- Ecclesiastical Committee (Joint Committee) Lords 2002–2015
- Human Rights (Joint Committee) 2001–03
- Relations between Central and Local Government, Select Committee (1995–96)
- Delegated Powers and Regulatory Reform 1993–98
- Science and Technology: Sub-Committee I 1993–95
- Science and Technology Committee (Lords) 1992–95
- Member House of Lords Select Committee on Science and Technology 1992–95, 1997–2005, 2008–10, 2010–14
- Member House of Lords 1991–2016

The official record can be found on her House of Lords career page.

== Appointments ==
=== 2010 to 2019 ===
- Member of the Foundation Board of Lucy Cavendish College, Cambridge University. (2018 – Present)
- Member of the Board of the British University in Egypt (2018 – Present)
- Patron: National Conference of University Professors (2016– )
- Chair Governing Body Kaplan College (2014–15)
- Abbey Schools (2012–14)
- Sub-Committee I [Higher education in STEM subjects] (2011–12)

=== 2000 to 2009 ===
- EU Sub-Committee G – Social Policies and Consumer Protection (2007–09)
- Co- Chairman Policy Group on Public Services, Cons Party (2006–07)
- Honorary Freeman of the Worshipful Company of Fishmongers (2006)
- Chair of City and Guilds Quality and Standards Committee (2005–10)
- Patron: British Friends of Neve Shalom-Watat al Salaam (2005)
- Chair, Inquiry into Energy Efficiency (2004–05)
- Inquiry into Animals in Scientific Experiments, Nuffield Council on Bio-Ethics (2003–05)
- President, Foundation for Higher Education (2002–06)
- Ecclesiastical Committee (2002–16)
- On Stem Cell Research (2001–02)
- Chair of Governors and Trustee of Roehampton Institute, University of Surrey (2001–2006)
- Pro-Chancellor and Member of Council, University of Surrey (2001–06)
- President, Westminster & City Branch of Chartered Management Institute (2000–14)
- Vice President, City and Guilds of London Institute
- Vice President, British Youth Opera
- Governor of Gresham's School, Holt (2000–06)
- Governor, London South Bank Centre
- President, Council for Independent Education (CIFE) (2000–13)

=== 1990 to 1999 ===
- C of E Rec Cp on Operation of Crown Appointments Committee (1999–2001)
- Alexander Stone Lecturer in Rhetoric, Glasgow (1999)
- Judges Panel on Citizen's Charter (1997–2004)
- Trustee, Cambridge University Foundation (1997–2006)
- Chairman All-Party University Group (1996–2009)
- Royal Society Project Sci, Bd of Patron, (1995–2003)
- Relations between Central and Local Government, Select Committee (1995–96)
- Chair, Friends of Southwark Cath (1994–2002)
- Vice-president City and Guilds of London Institute (1994–99)
- On Scrutiny of Delegated Power (1994–98)
- Chairman DTI Export Group of Education and Training Sector (1993–98)
- National Adv. Council on Education and Training Targets (1993–98)
- Companion of the Institute of Management (CIMgt 1993)
- Trustee, Daphne Jackson Memorial Trust
- Companion of the Institute of Management
- Board of Directors, South Bank Centre, (1992–94)
- Vice Chancellor South Bank University (1992–93)
- Northern Ireland Higher Education Funding Council (1992–94)
- Patron: British Youth Opera (1992–)
- Liveryman of the Worshipful Company of Bakers (1992)
- Freeman of the City of London (1992)
- Adv. on Police Training to Home Office (1991–93)
- Member Court, University of Bath (1991–99)
- Trustee, Bacon's City Technology College (1991–99)
- St Mark's College, Limpopo SA (1991)
- Rector's Warden Southward Cath (1990–94)

=== 1980 to 1989 ===
- ESRC Board Membership (1988–91)
- Director South Bank Poly (1987–92)
- Governing Body Institute of Development Studies, Sussex Uni (1987–94)
- Member: Committee on International Co-Operation in Higher Education, British Council (1987–97)
- Chief Inspector, for Schools UK (1981–86)

=== 1970 to 1979 ===
- Staff Inspector (1975)
- HM Inspector of School (1970–86)

=== 1960 to 1969 ===
- Part time Lecturer in Education, Dept of Education Studies, Oxford University (1966–70)
- Tutor for Inservice Training, Berks (1966–70)
- Lecturer in Education (part time) University of Exeter (1962–66)
- Lecturer in Philosophy: University of Massachusetts at Salem, (1960–62)
- Lecturer in Philosophy: University of Manitoba (1957–59)
- Research Fellow, University of Manitoba (1956–57)
- High School Evaluator, New England USA (1959–61)
- Teacher in English Secondary Schools, Canadian and American High Schools (1953–54 and 1959–61)

=== Other Memberships (not dated) ===
- Political Editorial Advisor at i-MAGAZINE
- Member of the Institute of Directors
- Member of the International Women's Forum
- Patron, Women's Engineering Society
- Patron, St Mark's School, Limpopo Province, South Africa

The list of appointments can be found in the Who's Who publication.

== Honorary Doctorates and Fellowships ==
The Rt Hon Baroness Perry of Southwark has been awarded the following academic honorary doctorates and fellowships by university's worldwide for her work.

=== Doctorates ===
- Bath LL.D 1991
- Sussex D.Litt. 1992
- Aberdeen LL.D 1994
- LSBU LLD 1994
- Wolverhampton Ed.D. 1994
- Surrey D.Univ 1995
- City D.Litt. 2000
- Mercy College, New York. D.Ed. 2014

=== Fellowships ===
- City and Guilds of London (2000)
- Girton College, Cambridge (1995)
- London South Bank University (1994)
- Sunderland University (1990)
- Lucy Cavendish College, Cambridge (1987)
- Roehampton University
- College of Preceptors

=== Companion of the Institute of Management ===
- Hon. Freeman of the Worshipful Company of Fishmongers (2006)
- Freeman of the City of London (1992)

== Books and Published Works ==
She has published numerous articles, contributed chapters in twelve books, and published five books.

=== Published books ===
- The Womb in Which I Lay: Daughters Finding Their Mothers in Life and in Death (published: 6 Mar. 2005)
- Diversity and Excellence: A Contribution to the Debate (2001)
- Case Studies in Adolescence (published: 1 Jan. 1970)
- Your Guide to the Opposite Sex for the Under-twenties (published: 1 Jan. 1970)
- Case Studies in Teaching Paperback (published: 1 Dec. 1969)

Her book can be found on the authors page on Amazon and on Google Books.

=== Biographical Publications ===
Pauline Perry appears in several biographical publications which reference her career and achievements.

- 'Who's Who' published by A &C Black
- 'People of Today' published by Debrett's
- 'Peerage and Baronetage' published by Debrett's
- ‘Dictionary of International Biography’ published by Melrose Press Ltd, Cambridge
- ‘Who’s Who in the World’ published by Marquis Who's Who LLC. USA
- '2000 Outstanding Intellectuals of the 21st Century' Ninth Edition. published by Melrose Press Ltd, Cambridge

== Arms ==
Coat of arms of Pauline Perry, Baroness Perry of Southwark
Coronet A coronet of a baroness. Escutcheon Sable, in dexter chief a sun in splendour issuant and in base a pear slipped and leaved Gold (Perry), on an inescutcheon of pretence Argent, a cross of lozenges, in the first quarter a crescent enclosing a quaver and in the fourth quarter a cinquefoil Gules (Welch). Supporters Dexter, a marmalade tom cat proper; sinister, upon a pile of three books, the spines visible bound Gules, the pages edged Gold, a Persian cat Sable, the nose, breast and feet Argent, each supporting between the forepaws a quill argent penned or. Motto Ancilla Domini

== Sources ==
- House of Lords Register of Interests: Baroness Perry of Southwark, parliament.the-stationery-office.co.uk; accessed 1 April 2016.

Academic offices
Preceded by ?	Vice-Chancellor of South Bank Polytechnic / South Bank University; 1986–1993	Succeeded by Gerald Bernbaum
Preceded by Dame Anne Warburton	President of Lucy Cavendish College, Cambridge; 1994–2001	Succeeded by Dame Veronica Sutherland
