= Francois Gordon =

Jean François Gordon

British Ambassador to Algeria
- In office 1996–1999

British Ambassador to Ivory Coast
- In office 2001–2004

High Commissioner to Uganda
- In office 2005–2008

Personal details
- Born: 16 April 1953 (age 72)
- Occupation: Diplomat, Political Advisor
- Awards: CMG (1999), CVO (2007)

Jean Francois Gordon CMG CVO (born 16 April 1953) was the British Ambassador to Algeria from 1996 to 1999, Ambassador to the Ivory Coast from 2001 to 2004 and High Commissioner to Uganda from 2005 to 2008.

== Foreign Office career ==
Gordon joined the Foreign and Commonwealth Office in 1979 and worked in the European Commission Department. In 1981, he was posted to Angola as the First Secretary for Luanda.

He later served as First Secretary for the British Delegation to the Conference of Disarmament in Geneva from 1983 to 1988, before becoming the Head of Finance for the Foreign & Commonwealth Office in the United Nations from 1988 to 1989, First Secretary to Nairobi from 1990 to 1992 and Head of Crime, Drugs and Terrorism Department for the FCO.

Upon retiring from the Foreign Office in 2009 he became the European Strategy Advisor for the Kent Police.

For his ambassador work he was appointed CMG in 1999, and CVO in 2007 when Queen Elizabeth II visited Uganda for a Commonwealth Heads of Government Meeting.

== Political career ==
In 2012 Gordon stated that he would be standing in the England and Wales Police and Crime Commissioner elections for the Conservative Party nomination to represent Kent as its Police Commissioner. However he was unsuccessful.

Diplomatic posts
Preceded by Peter James Marshall	British Ambassador to Algeria; 1996–1999	Succeeded by William Sinton
Preceded by Haydon Warren-Gash	Ambassador to Côte d'Ivoire; 2001–2004	Succeeded by David Coates
Preceded by Adam Wood	High Commissioner to Uganda; 2005–2008	Succeeded by Martin Shearman
