= Nigel Peake =

Irish architect

Nigel Peake (born 1981) is an Irish architect who is known for his unique drawing style. He has collaborated with well-known companies such as The New York Times, Hermès and Flos. Peake's artwork has been exhibited in Paris, Tokyo, London, and New York.

Peake studied architecture at the University of Edinburgh. In 2005, the Royal Institute of British Architects (RIBA) awarded his thesis project a "silver medal commendation" in their annual President's Medal Exhibition.

Peake's drawings have been collected in several volumes published by Princeton Architectural Press and Yvon Lambert.
