= Jackie Ashley =

English journalist and broadcaster

The Honourable Jackie Ashley

President of Lucy Cavendish College, Cambridge
- In office October 2015 – 2018
- Preceded by: Janet Todd
- Succeeded by: Madeleine Atkins

Personal details
- Born: Jacqueline Ashley; 10 September 1954 (age 71) St. Pancras, London, England
- Spouse: Andrew Marr (m. 1987)
- Children: 3
- Parent(s): Jack Ashley; Pauline Crispin
- Education: St Anne's College, Oxford
- Occupation: Journalist

Jacqueline Ashley (born 10 September 1954) is an English journalist and broadcaster.

== Early life ==
Ashley was born in St Pancras, London. She is the daughter of Pauline Kay (née Crispin) and Jack Ashley, Baron Ashley of Stoke, a Labour MP and life peer.

She was educated at Rosebery Grammar School for Girls, a grammar school in Epsom, Surrey. She went on to study Philosophy, Politics and Economics at St Anne's College, Oxford. She was a member of the Oxford University Broadcasting Society.

== Career ==
She has been a television news reporter and newspaper journalist, writing for the New Statesman and The Guardian. She specialises in the Labour Party, the media, politics, public services, trade unions and women's issues. She was broadly a supporter of Gordon Brown's government.

Having graduated from university, she spent two years, from 1979–81, as a trainee with the BBC. She was a producer and newsreader on Newsnight from 1981–84. Then, from 1984–86, she was a reporter on TV-am, and a producer and reporter on Channel 4. She moved to ITN in 1986, where she was a political correspondent. She then moved from television to print media, and was political editor of the New Statesman from 2000 to 2002. Since 2002, she has been a columnist and political interviewer for The Guardian.

From October 2015 to October 2018, Ashley was President of Lucy Cavendish College, Cambridge. She has been a trustee of the Carers Trust since July 2019.

== Personal life ==
Jackie Ashley married fellow journalist Andrew Marr in Surrey in August 1987; they live in Primrose Hill, North London. The couple have a son and two daughters.

Academic offices
Preceded by Janet Todd OBE	President of Lucy Cavendish College, Cambridge; 2015–2018	Succeeded by Dame Madeleine Atkins
