= James Mellon =

British diplomat and writer (1929–2023)

Sir James Mellon, KCMG (25 January 1929 – 2 July 2023) was a British diplomat and writer.

== Early life and education ==
Mellon was born in Glasgow in 1929. He was educated at St Aloysius' College, Glasgow. Later, he studied classics, economics, and political science at Glasgow University and briefly pursued further studies at Aarhus University before joining the UK Civil Service, influenced by his experience in RAF signals intelligence.

== Career ==
Mellon's early diplomatic career included postings in Germany, Denmark, and at the Scottish Office's Department of Agriculture. He became involved with the European Communities in 1967, as the UK attempted to join the Common Market. Stationed in Brussels, he played a crucial role in relaying detailed negotiation stances back to London until the UK successfully joined the European Economic Community in 1973.

Mellon later served as the head of the Foreign, Commonwealth and Development Office's (FCO) scientific and technology department, the commercial counsellor in East Berlin, and the leader of the FCO's trade relations and export department. He also served as an ambassador to Ghana during the 1970s.

In 1983, Mellon was appointed as the British Ambassador to Denmark, a position he held for three years before his final diplomatic role as Consul-General in New York and Director General for Trade and Investment in the U.S., where he worked to promote British interests and investment.

After retiring from diplomatic service in 1989, Mellon served as the chairman of Scottish Homes and later as the executive chairman of Thamesmead Town. He also chaired Regent Pacific Finance, which later became Charlemagne Capital.

== Charity work ==
Mellon was vice-president of St Andrew's Clinics for Children (STACC), a charity that supports healthcare provision for children in Sub-Saharan Africa.

== Personal life ==
Mellon was married twice, first to Frances Murray until her death in 1976, and then to Philippa Shuttleworth. Mellon is survived by his children and stepchildren.

== Awards and recognition ==
Mellon was awarded a CMG in 1979 and was elevated to KCMG in 1988.

== Bibliography ==
- A Danish Gospel (1986)
- The Great African Bangle Culture (2018)
