= Girish Menon =

Charity executive and college head

Girish in 2014

Girish Menon is a charity executive and academic administrator who became the 10th President of Lucy Cavendish College, Cambridge, on 1 October 2025. Before joining Lucy Cavendish, he held senior roles in the international development and charity sectors, including Chief Executive of ActionAid UK, Chief Executive of STiR Education, Interim Chief Executive of UNICEF UK, and Deputy Chief Executive and International Programmes Director at WaterAid UK.

== Early life and education ==
Menon was born and brought up in Ahmedabad, Gujarat, India. He studied accountancy and audit at Gujarat University, graduating with a Bachelor of Commerce (BCom) degree in 1983. He later attended the Institute of Rural Management Anand, completing a postgraduate diploma in rural management in 1985.

== Career ==
=== International development ===
Menon began his career with the Aga Khan Rural Support Programme in Gujarat in 1985. In 1988, he moved to Kerala to work for ActionAid, and was seconded to Reaching the Unreached, a partner organisation founded by James Kimpton. He later returned to ActionAid as a programme manager in northern India and established a regional office in Bhopal.

After working for ActionAid in India, Menon worked for Plan International and then for the United Kingdom's Department for International Development in India. In 2005, he moved to London to join WaterAid. He later became WaterAid's director of international operations and, from 2012, deputy chief executive.

=== Charity sector leadership ===
In 2015, Menon was appointed chief cxecutive of ActionAid UK, succeeding Richard Miller. The appointment was also the subject of a later Third Sector profile in its "Big Hire" series. His tenure at ActionAid UK as including a strategic reset of the charity's finances, operations, identity and culture. He was named by Charity Times readers among the publication's 25 most influential charity-sector leaders in 2019.

In 2020, Menon left ActionAid UK to become chief executive of STiR Education, an international non-governmental organisation working with education systems in India and Uganda. In 2024, he was appointed interim chief executive of UNICEF UK pending the arrival of Philip Goodwin as the charity's permanent chief executive.

=== Academic administrator ===
On 24 March 2025, it was announced that Menon had been appointed as the next president of Lucy Cavendish College, Cambridge. He was officially elected as president with effect from 1 October 2025, succeeding Dame Madeleine Atkins.

=== Other roles ===
Menon has held trustee and board roles in the charity sector. As of 2026, he was listed by the British Asian Trust as a member of its Programme and Partnerships Committee. The Charity Commission register also lists him as a trustee of Hope and Homes for Children, appointed in December 2020.
