= List of ambassadors of the Kingdom of England to Denmark =

Ambassador of the Kingdom of England to Denmark
- Coat of Arms of England
- Style: His Excellency
- Residence: Copenhagen
- Appointer: The monarch
- Final holder: James Vernon the younger

The Ambassador of the Kingdom of England to Denmark was the foremost diplomatic representative of the historic Kingdom of England in Denmark, also referred to as the Kingdoms of Denmark and Norway, before the creation of the Kingdom of Great Britain in 1707.

The position was not always a continuous or permanent one, and there was sometimes no diplomatic representation between the two countries.

== Envoys Extraordinary of England ==
- 1632: Robert Sidney, 2nd Earl of Leicester
- 1655: Henry Wilmot, 1st Earl of Rochester
- September 1664 to April 1666: Sir Gilbert Talbot, Special Envoy;
- 1671: Hon. Charles Bertie
- 1671–1672: Charles Stewart, 3rd Duke of Richmond
- 1681-1682: Robert Robartes, Viscount Bodmin
- 1685-1692 Robert Molesworth
  - 1689: Thomas Fotherby Commissary and Plenipotentiary
  - 1691: Charles Douglas Special Mission
- 1692-1702 Hugh Greg Chargé d'Affaires until 1711, then Minister Resident
  - 1693: Robert Sutton, 2nd Baron Lexinton
  - 1699-1700: James Cressett
- 1702-1706 James Vernon the younger (d. 1756), son of James Vernon, Secretary of State

== After the Union of England and Scotland ==
In 1707 the Kingdom of England became part of the new Kingdom of Great Britain. For missions from the Court of St James's after 1707, see List of ambassadors of Great Britain to Denmark.
