= Madeleine Atkins =

British academic

Dame Madeleine Atkins DBE DL FAcSS
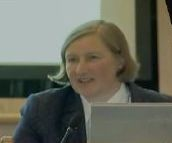
- Professor Atkins in 2008

President of Lucy Cavendish College, Cambridge
- In office 2018–2025
- Preceded by: Jackie Ashley
- Succeeded by: Girish Menon

Personal details
- Born: 2 July 1952 (age 73)

Dame Madeleine Julia Atkins, DBE DL FAcSS (born 2 July 1952) is a British academic administrator, scholar of education, and former teacher. Between 2018 and 2025 she served as the ninth president of Lucy Cavendish College, Cambridge. She was formerly vice-chancellor of Coventry University, and the chief executive of the Higher Education Funding Council for England (2014–2018).

== Early life and education ==
Atkins was born on 2 July 1952. She studied law and history at Girton College, Cambridge, graduating with a Bachelor of Arts (BA) degree in 1974. She then trained as a teacher at Lady Margaret Hall, Oxford, completing a Postgraduate Certificate in Education (PGCE). She obtained a PhD from University of Nottingham in 1982.

== Career ==
Atkins was a school teacher from 1975 to 1979, before leaving to study for a doctorate. She was then a post-doctoral researcher at the University of Nottingham from 1982 to 1983, before joining Newcastle University in 1984 as a lecturer. She was promoted to senior lecturer in 1988, and rose to be pro-vice-chancellor (1998 to 2004).

She was vice-chancellor of Coventry University from 2004 to 2013. She became chief executive of the Higher Education Funding Council for England (HEFCE) on 1 January 2014. In 2015, Atkins was paid a salary of between £230,000 and £234,999 by HEFCE, making her one of the 328 most highly paid people in the British public sector at that time. In June 2018, it was revealed by the University and College Union that she received a pay package worth £554,648 in 2017, which represents a 96% increase on the £282,354 paid to her in 2016–17.

In July 2018, it was announced that Atkins would be the next president of Lucy Cavendish College, Cambridge, in succession to Jackie Ashley. She took up the post in October 2018, becoming the college's ninth president.

== Honours ==
Atkins was appointed a Commander of the Order of the British Empire (CBE) in the 2012 New Year Honours for services to Higher Education. She was promoted to Dame Commander of the Order of the British Empire (DBE) in the 2019 New Year Honours. She is a deputy lieutenant (DL) of the West Midlands.

In 2016, she was elected a Fellow of the Academy of Social Sciences (FAcSS).

Academic offices
| Preceded by Jackie Ashley | President of Lucy Cavendish College, Cambridge; 2018 to present | Incumbent |
