= Walter Titley =

English diplomat

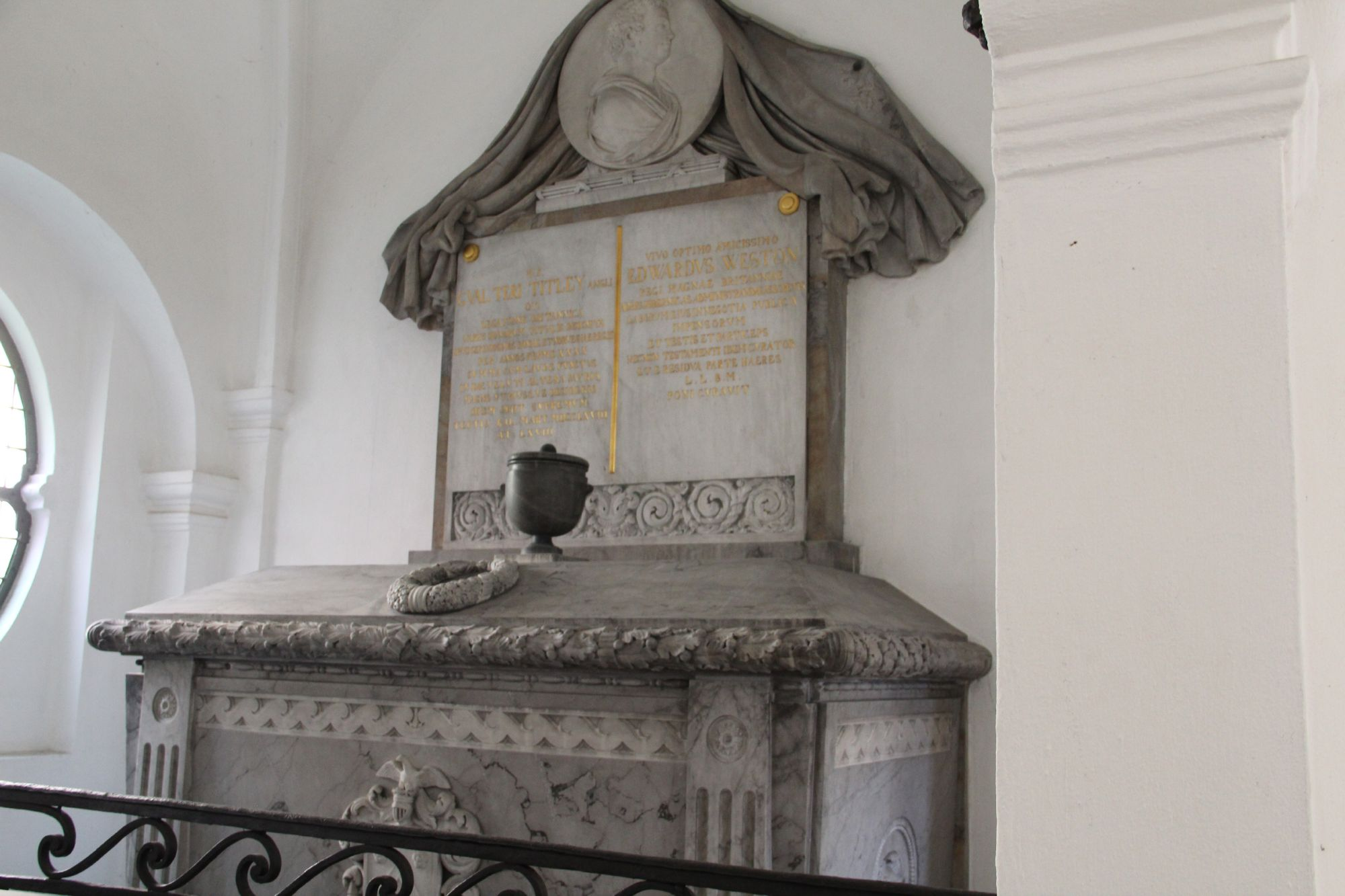
Titley's sarcogagis and epitaph in St. Peter's Church in Copenhagen.

Walter Titley (baptised 1698 – 1768) was an English diplomat, envoy-extraordinary at Copenhagen for 38 years.

== Life ==
He was the son of Abraham Titley of Hopton, Staffordshire. He was admitted a king's scholar at Westminster School in 1714, and was three years later elected to Cambridge. While at Westminster he acted as "help" to Osborn Atterbury, son of Francis Atterbury, and later was his tutor. At Trinity College, Cambridge, he matriculated in 1720, and graduated B.A. in 1723, M.A. in 1726.

Titley laid down a plan for life, and approximately carried it out: first 30 years of study, then 30 years give to public business, and after the age of 60, back to study. Having entered the diplomatic service, he became secretary of the British embassy at Turin. On 3 January 1729 he was selected to act as chargé d'affaires at Copenhagen, in the absence of Lord Glenorchy; and on 3 November 1730 was named envoy-extraordinary. The strategic aim of Great Britain was to avoid Denmark allying itself with France.

In 1733 Richard Bentley, Master of Trinity College, appointed him to the college's physic fellowship; Titley resigned his diplomatic position to accept it, but did in the end did not move from Copenhagen. He resumed his post, and held it for the remainder of his life. During his time there, two Hanoverian princesses married into the Danish royal family.

On Titley's application to Frederick V of Denmark in 1761, the king agreed to order the seizure and extradition of British deserters from the British army and navy, on condition of a similar service being performed for him in England. Two years later, in 1763, Titley was, on the ground of age and infirmity, granted an assistant.

Titley died at Copenhagen in February 1768 and was buried in St. Peter's Church, Copenhagen. He left £1,000 each to Westminster School and Trinity College, and £500 to the University of Cambridge. Part of the last bequest was to be devoted to buildings. His sarcofagus and epitaph were created by Johannes Wiedewelt.

== Works ==
Titley wrote an Imitation in English of an ode of Horace (second ode of the third book of Horace), admired by Bentley who parodied it. Both poems and in James Henry Monk's Life of Bentley. Some of his Latin verses are contained in Reliquiæ Galeanæ. The poem Laterna Megalographica, included in Vincent Bourne's Works (1772), is also attributed to Titley.
