= Eric Berthoud =

British oil man and diplomat

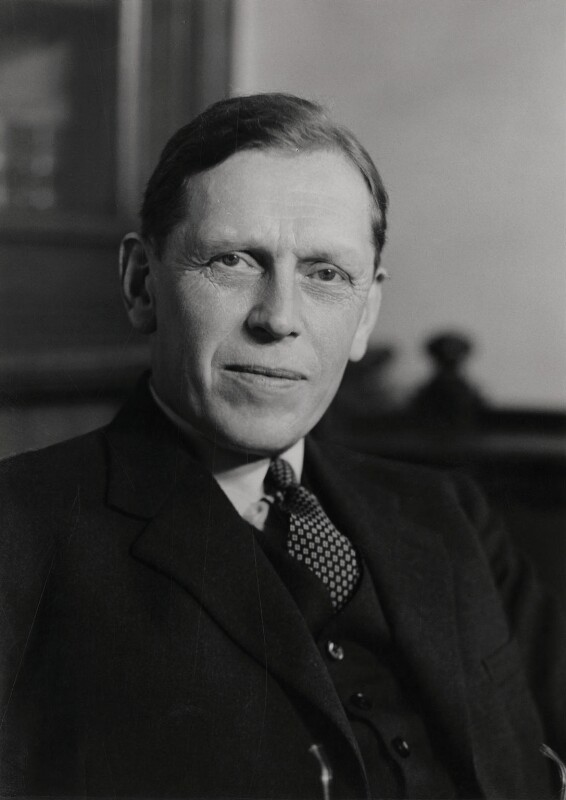
Berthoud in 1952

Sir Eric Alfred Berthoud KCMG (10 December 1900 – 29 April 1989) was an oil man and diplomat who served as the British ambassador to Denmark (1952–1956) and Poland (1956–1960).

== Early life and education ==
Berthoud was born in Kensington, London, United Kingdom of Great Britain and Ireland, son of Alfred Edward Berthoud, a partner in the merchant bank Coulon, Berthoud & Co., and his wife, Hélène Christ, who was a member of a Swiss banking family. He was their second son and had three brothers and two sisters. While he was at school, his father's bank collapsed. His father became an alcoholic and died in 1920.

After five years at Gresham's School, Holt, Norfolk, he went up to Magdalen College, Oxford. He played hockey for Oxford University and took a degree in chemistry in 1922.

== Career ==
From 1922 to 1926, Berthoud worked for the Anglo-Austrian Bank in Vienna, Austria, and Milan, Italy, then joined the Anglo-Persian Oil Company (later BP), serving in Paris, France, from 1926 to 1929, in Berlin, Germany and Nazi Germany, from 1929 to 1935, and then in Paris again, from 1935 to 1938.

When the Second World War broke out in 1939, Berthoud joined the Ministry of Fuel and Power and was attached to the British legation in Bucharest. In January 1941, Britain broke off relations with Romania and the legation was closed. Berthoud spent the next four years on missions aimed at securing oil for the Allies.

In 1945 he was at the Allied Control Commission for Allied-occupied Austria, then worked on European peace treaties and on the Marshall Plan. He was assistant under-secretary in the Foreign Office from 1948 to 1952, then ambassador to Denmark (1952–1956) and Poland (1956–1960). He retired in May 1960.

In retirement, Berthoud became a non-executive director of some BP boards. He worked for the United World Colleges and the Anglo-Polish round-table conferences. He was the founding Chairman of the new University of Essex (1965) and in 1969 became a Deputy lieutenant of Essex, holding that role until 1975.

He died in Tunbridge Wells, Kent.

== Family ==
In 1927, Berthoud married Ruth Tilston, daughter of Sir Charles Bright, an engineer and fellow of the Royal Society of Edinburgh. They had three sons and two daughters. One son died very young.

== Honours ==
- Companion of the Most Distinguished Order of St Michael and St George, 1945 New Year Honours
- Knight Commander of the Most Distinguished Order of St Michael and St George, 1954 New Year Honours
