= Lucy Cavendish College, Cambridge =

College of the University of Cambridge

Lucy Cavendish College
- University of Cambridge
- College House and Oldham Hall, Lucy Cavendish College

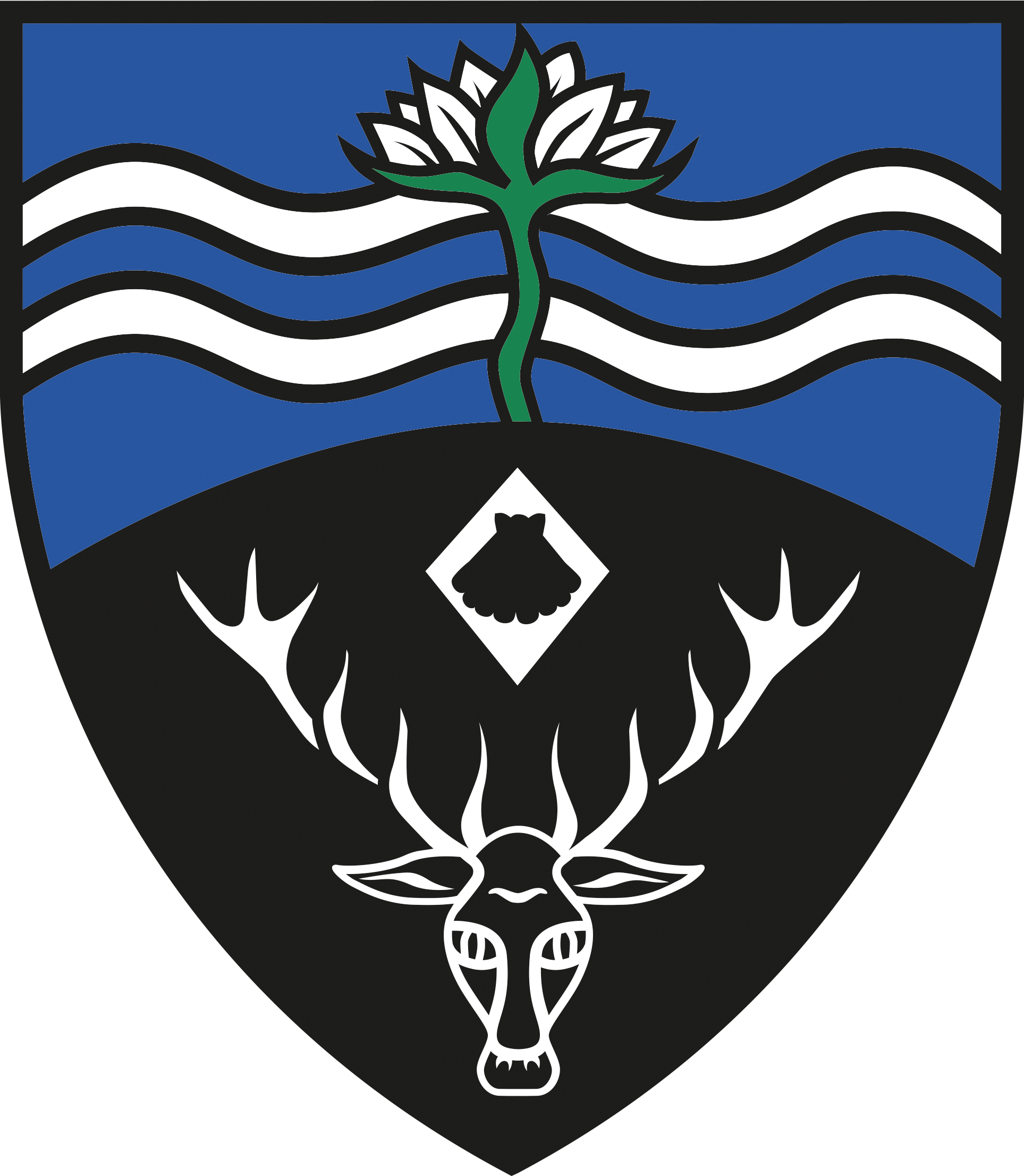
- Arms: Per fess enarched azure and sable, in chief two bars wavy argent, over all issuant from the fess line a water lily also argent slipped and leaved vert, and in base a buck's head caboshed, between the attires a lozenge argent charged with an escallop sable
Scarf colours: eight alternating stripes of black and blue of varying width, with wide black and narrow blue stripes transitioning towards narrow black and wide blue stripes across the face of the scarf
- Location: Lady Margaret Road (map)
- Coordinates: 52°12′40″N 0°06′36″E
- Full name: Lucy Cavendish College in the University of Cambridge
- Abbreviation: LC
- Established: 1965
- Named after: Lucy Cavendish
- Sister college: Regent's Park College, Oxford
- President: Girish Menon
- Undergraduates: 459
- Postgraduates: 684
- Endowment: £18.8m (2025)
- Website: www.lucy.cam.ac.uk
- Students' union: www.lucy.cam.ac.uk/college-community/place-live-and-study/students-union
- Boat club: Lucy Cavendish College Boat Club

Map
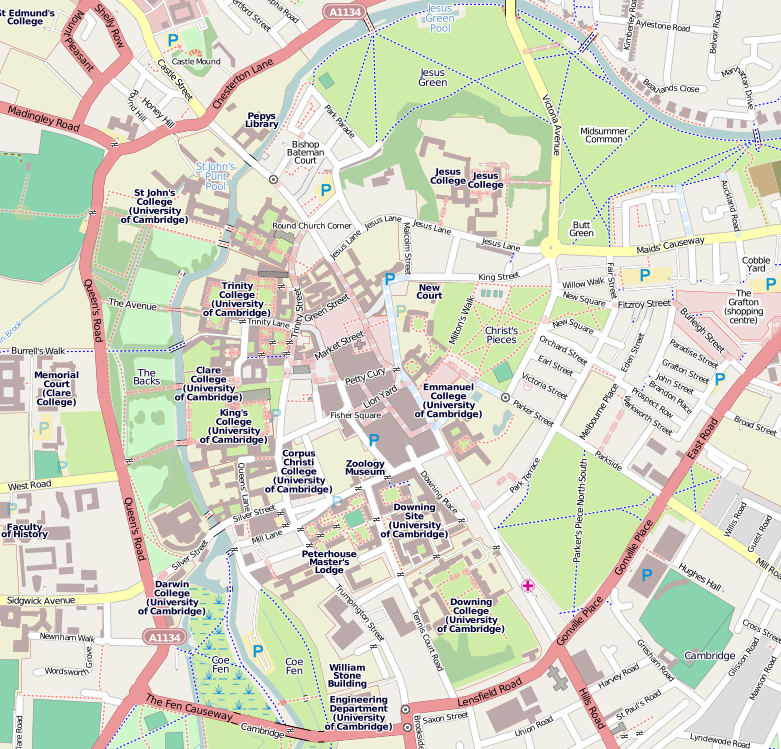
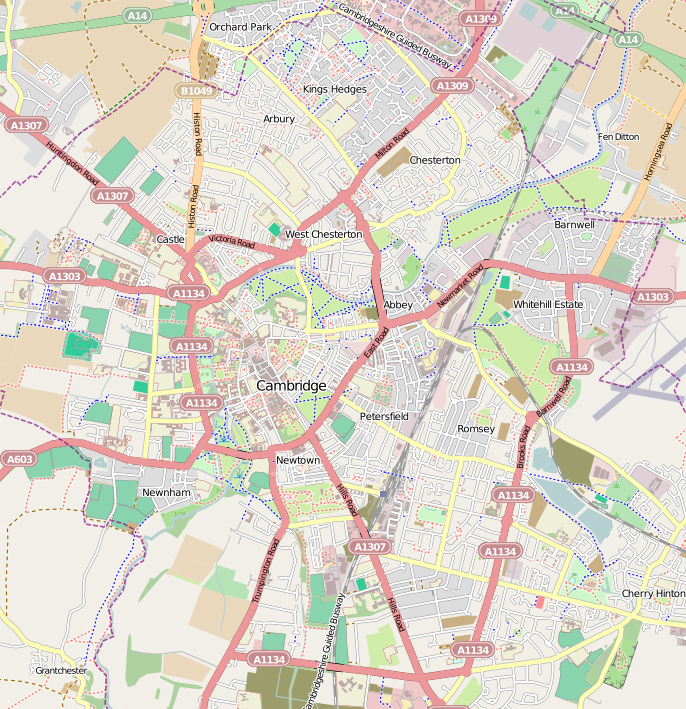
- Location within Central Cambridge Location within Cambridge

Lucy Cavendish College is a constituent college of the University of Cambridge. The college was established in 1965 as a women's college and since 2021 has admitted both women and men.

The college is named in honour of Lucy Cavendish (1841–1925), who campaigned for the reform of women's education.

== History ==
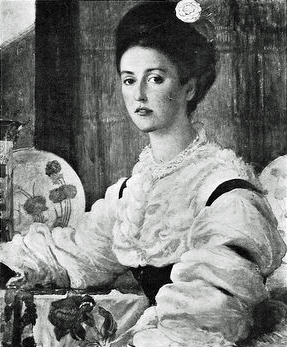
Lucy Caroline Cavendish, a pioneer of women's education

The college was founded in 1965 by female academics of the University of Cambridge who believed that the university offered too few and too restricted opportunities for women as either students or academics. Its origins are traceable to the Society of Women Members of the Regent House who are not Fellows of Colleges (informally known as the Dining Group) which in the 1950s sought to provide the benefits of collegiality to its members who, being female, were not college fellows. At the time there were only two women's colleges in Cambridge, Girton and Newnham, insufficient for the large and growing numbers of female academic staff in the university.

The college was named in honour of Lucy Caroline Cavendish, a pioneer of women's education and the great-aunt of one of its founders, Margaret Braithwaite. First formally recognised as the Lucy Cavendish Collegiate Society, it moved to its current site in 1970, received consent to be called Lucy Cavendish College in 1986, and gained the status of a full college of the university by Royal Charter in 1997.

The first president of the college, from 1965 to 1970, was Anna McClean Bidder, one of the founding members of the Dining Group and a zoologist specialising in cephalopod digestion; this accounts for the presence of the nautilus shell in the college coat of arms. She was succeeded by Kate Bertram until 1979, Phyllis Hetzel (Lady Bowden), Dame Anne Warburton, Baroness Perry of Southwark, Dame Veronica Sutherland, Janet Todd, Jackie Ashley and Madeleine Atkins. The current and tenth president of Lucy Cavendish is Girish Menon, who took up the post in 2025, and is the first male president of the college.

With effect from October 2021, Lucy Cavendish has admitted both women and men from the standard university age. The college gave as its primary reason for the change "to grow graduate and undergraduate numbers to support the University and the other colleges in making more places available for excellent students from under-represented backgrounds." The mission of the college was to open the Cambridge door to talented and exceptional students from under-represented and non-traditional backgrounds. Lucy Cavendish, uniquely in Cambridge, became broadly representative in its UK student body of the UK's national society. On 4 December 2019 the college appointed its first male fellows. In the 2022 admission cycle, Lucy Cavendish became the first University of Cambridge college to admit more than 90% of its undergraduates from state schools. Today, the student community spans more than 85 countries, with over 93% of UK undergraduates from state schools.

== College site ==
For the first few years of the college's existence it occupied rooms first in Silver Street and then in Northampton Street. In 1970 it moved to its current site on the corner of Madingley Road and Lady Margaret Road, near Westminster College and St John's College, which had provided some of the land.

In 1991 the college bought Balliol Croft, a neighbouring house to its grounds and former home of the economist Alfred Marshall and his wife Mary Paley Marshall, with whom he wrote his first economics textbook. The building was renamed Marshall House in his honour and used for student accommodation until 2001 when it was converted back to its original layout and used as the President's Lodge. Meanwhile, the majority of the college's buildings, including Warburton Hall and the library, were completed in the 1990s.

The college is situated on a site just north-west of central Cambridge bounded by Madingley Road and Lady Margaret Road. It is based around three converted 19th-century villas and a new eco-friendly and accessible Passivhaus building. The new accommodation building meets and exceeds the Passivhaus standard and 100% of the college's electricity is supplied by renewables. In 2022 the college received the Platinum Award for Green Impact, the highest award offered by the United Nations' programme for environmentally and socially sustainable practice.

There is accommodation for 235 students with a further 507 rooms near its main site.

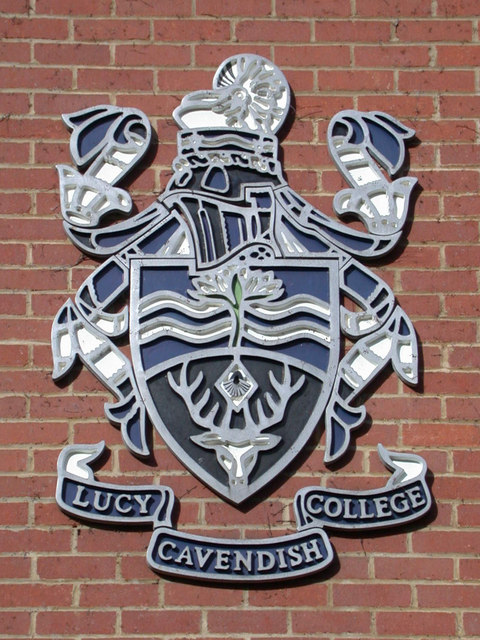
Lucy Cavendish College coat of arms

== Student life ==
Lucy Cavendish has more than 1000 students, approximately 40% of whom are undergraduates. The 2022 intake has recorded an intake of 91.1% of new UK students from state schools or FE colleges compared to the University average of 72.5%.

== Academic performance ==
The percentage of undergraduate/postgraduate students achieving 2.1 or 1st class honours degrees was 97% of all students eligible during 2020.

== Lucy Cavendish Fiction Prize ==
The college hosts the Lucy Cavendish Fiction Prize, open to women novelists over the age of 18 years who have not yet been published. Its winners include Claire Askew. Sarah Harman, Gail Honeyman and Sara Collins. It was sponsored by the Literary agency WME in 2024. It was founded by the academic Janet Todd.

== List of presidents ==
	Name	Term of office
1st President	Anna McClean Bidder	1965-1970
2nd President	Kate Bertram	1970-1979
3rd President	Phyllis Hetzel	1979-1984
4th President	Dame Anne Warburton	1985-1994
5th President	Pauline Perry, Baroness Perry of Southwark	1994-2001
6th President	Dame Veronica Sutherland	2001-2008
7th President	Janet Todd	2008-2015
8th President	Jackie Ashley	2015-2018
9th President	Dame Madeleine Atkins	2018-2025
10th President	Girish Menon	Since 2025

== Notable alumnae ==
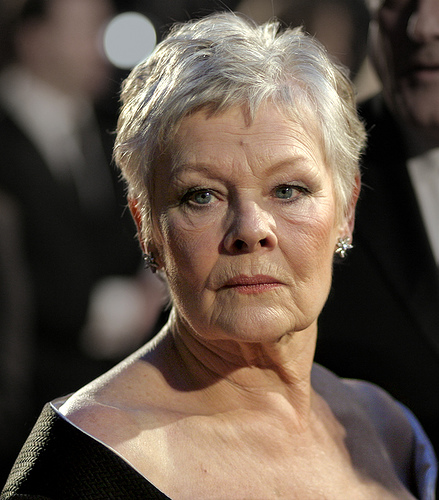
Dame Judi Dench is an Honorary Fellow of the college

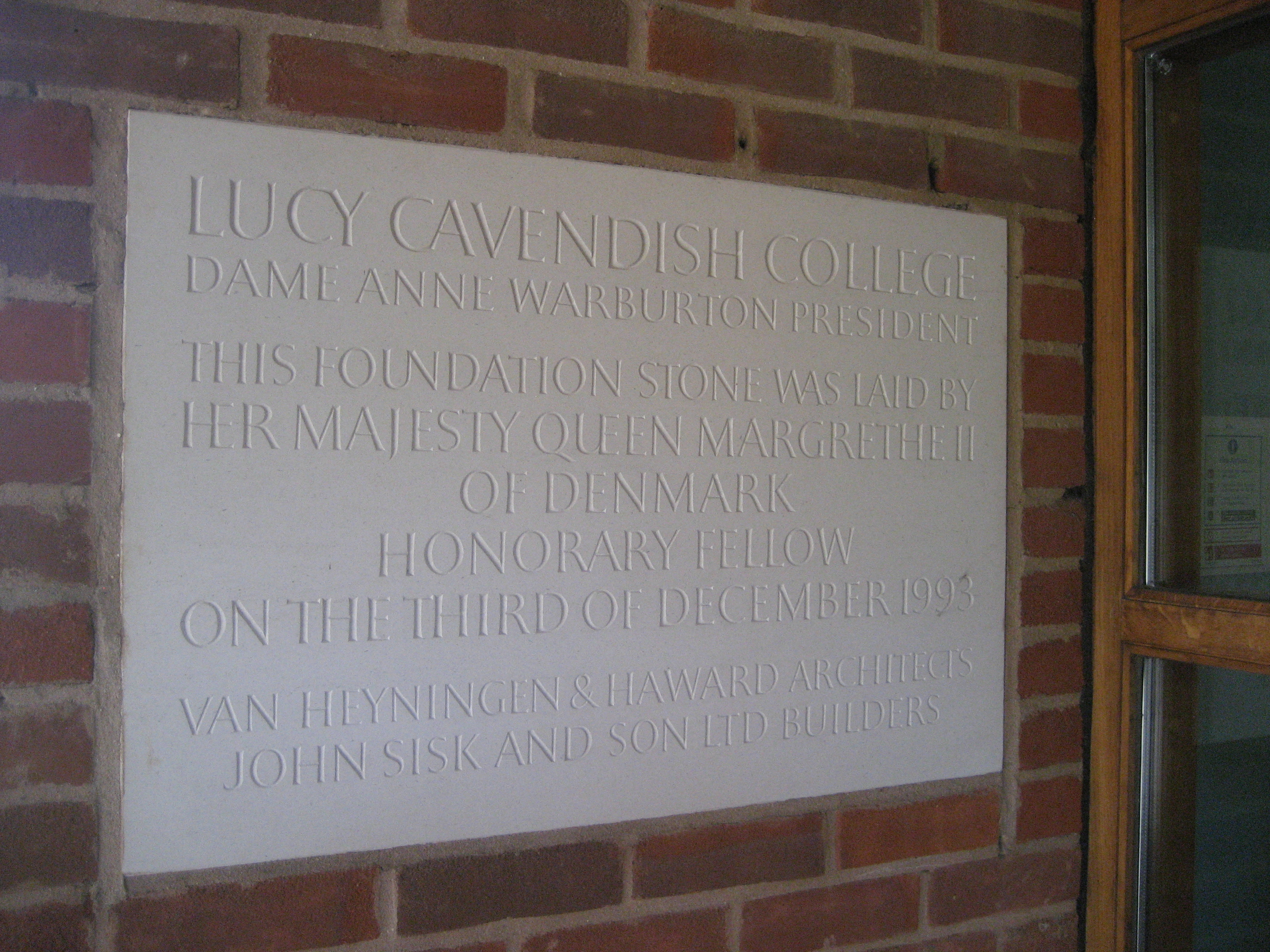
This stone was laid by Queen Margrethe of Denmark in December 1993

- Noeleen Heyzer, Under-Secretary-General of the United Nations and executive director of UNIFEM
- Rosena Allin-Khan, Member of Parliament for Tooting since 2016.

=== Honorary Fellows ===
- Jackie Ashley
- Carol M. Black
- Margaret Burbidge
- Shami Chakrabarti (2 March 2017)
- Jane Clarke
- Dame Judi Dench
- Janet Neel Cohen, Baroness Cohen of Pimlico
- Anna Ford
- Edwina Dunn
- Cynthia Glassman
- Sophie Hannah
- Helena Kennedy, Baroness Kennedy of The Shaws
- Queen Margrethe of Denmark
- Martina Navratilova
- Dame Anne Owers
- Pauline Perry, Baroness Perry of Southwark
- Nirmala Rao
- Alison Richard
- Dame Stella Rimington
- Sarah Sands
- Ali Smith
- Veronica Sutherland
- Dame Cath Tizard
- Janet Todd
- Sandi Toksvig
- Claire Tomalin
