= Martin Burton (academic) =

British researcher

Martin James Burton, FRCS (born December 1958) is a British otolaryngologist, academic administrator, and academic specialising in otology and evidence-based medicine. Since September 2023, he has been master of Sidney Sussex College, Cambridge. Previously, he worked in the National Health Service as an otological consultant surgeon, was Professor of Otolaryngology at the University of Oxford, and a research fellow in clinical medicine and vice-master of Balliol College, Oxford. He was additionally director of Cochrane UK until 2023.
