= John Willson (diplomat) =

British diplomat

John Michael Willson CMG (15 July 1931 –17 April 2013) was a British diplomat. He served as ambassador to the Ivory Coast, Burkina Faso and Niger from 1983 to 1987 and high commissioner to Zambia from 1988 to 1990. He was appointed Companion of the Order of St Michael and St George (CMG) in 1988.
