= Margaret Rothwell =

British diplomat (1938–2022)

Margaret Irene Rothwell CMG (25 August 1938– 15 September 2022) was a British diplomat.

== Early life and education ==
Born in Edinburgh to Harry Rothwell and Martha (née Goedecke), her mother was Germany. During World War II, Rothwell and her mother were evacuated to a farm in the hills until the birth of her sister in 1945. The family later relocated to Southampton when her father became head of the history faculty at Southampton University, and Rothwell attended Southampton Grammar School.

== Career ==
In 1957, Rothwell entered the Home Civil Service Fast Stream after studying classics at Lady Margaret Hall, Oxford. Her diplomatic assignments included positions in Strasbourg with the UK Delegation to the Council of Europe, Kenya, Washington, D.C., and Finland. In 1990, she was appointed ambassador to Ivory Coast, Niger, Burkina Faso, and Liberia.

Rothwell worked to expand opportunities for female officers within the Foreign Office, including supporting Arabic language training for women, which facilitated their placement in Middle Eastern postings. She continued her involvement with the Foreign Office Association after retirement, serving as editor of its newspaper.

== Personal life ==
Rothwell remained unmarried. She retired to Hampshire and remained active in her community until her death in 2022.
