= Haining (disambiguation) =

Haining is a city in Zhejiang, China.

Haining may also refer to:

- The Haining, Selkirk, Scotland
- Hayley Haining (born 1972), British runner
- Jane Haining (1897–1944), Church of Scotland missionary
- Peter Haining (author) (1940–2007), British journalist, author and anthologist
- Peter Haining (rower) (born 1962), Scottish rower
- Robert Haining (1882–1959), British general
- Robert Haining (minister) (1802–1874), Church of Scotland minister in South Australia
- Thomas Haining (1927-2005) British diplomat and ambassador to Mongolia
- Will Haining (born 1982), Scottish footballer
