= Paul Luzio =

British biologist

J Paul Luzio FMedSci (born 15 August 1947) is a British biologist who is Professor of Molecular Membrane Biology, Department of Clinical Biochemistry at the University of Cambridge, and was Master of St Edmund's College, Cambridge until 2014, as well as Director of the Cambridge Institute for Medical Research.

He was a student at Clare College, Cambridge reading Natural Sciences (Part II Biochemistry) as an undergraduate and studying for a Ph.D. in the Department of Biochemistry. After a period in Cardiff as a lecturer of medical biochemistry at the Welsh National School of Medicine, he returned to Cambridge where he became a lecturer in clinical biochemistry. He was subsequently promoted to Reader and then Professor.

Luzio's research is largely concerned with intracellular membrane traffic pathways in mammalian cells and his research group is funded by a programme grant from the Medical Research Council and project grant support from the Wellcome Trust.

He is an Honorary Fellow of St Edmund's College, Cambridge.

Academic offices
Preceded by Sir Brian Heap	Master of St Edmund's College, Cambridge; 2004–October 2014	Succeeded by Matthew Bullock
