= Catherine Arnold =

British ambassador

Catherine Arnold OBE
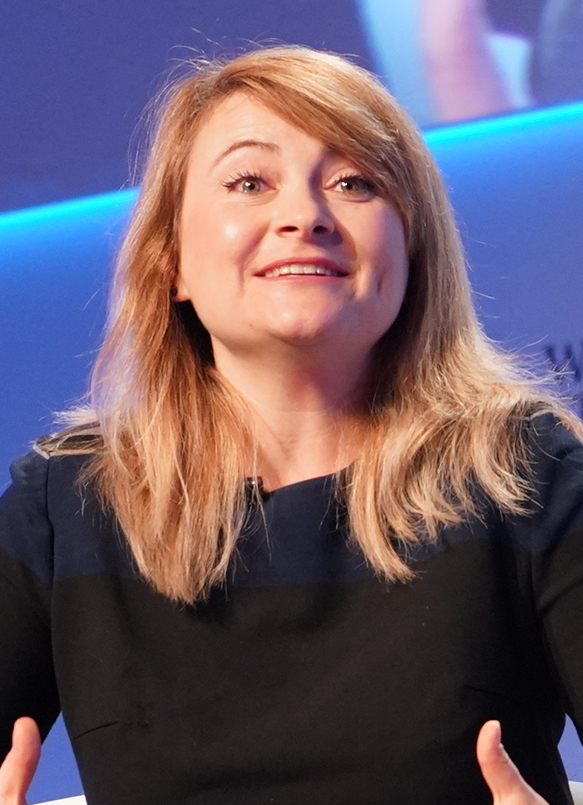
- Arnold in 2018

British Ambassador to Mongolia
- In office May 2015 – March 2018
- Monarch: Elizabeth II
- Prime Minister: David Cameron; Theresa May
- Preceded by: Christopher Stuart
- Succeeded by: Philip Malone

Personal details
- Born: 10 November 1978 (age 47) Pusan, South Korea
- Citizenship: United Kingdom
- Education: Overseas School of Colombo; Ryde School with Upper Chine
- Alma mater: Trinity College, Cambridge (BA, MPhil); University of Nottingham (MA)

Catherine Elizabeth Jane Arnold, OBE (born 10 November 1978) is a British academic administrator and former diplomat. From October 2019 to October 2024, she was the Master of St Edmund's College, Cambridge: she was the fifteenth person to hold that post and the first woman. From May 2015 until 2018, she served as Her Majesty's Ambassador to Mongolia. After three degrees, she worked as a management consultant and then journalist and then joined the Foreign and Commonwealth Office in 2006.

== Early life and education ==
Arnold was born on 10 November 1978 in Pusan, South Korea. She was educated at the Overseas School of Colombo, an English medium international school located in Colombo, Sri Lanka, and at the Ryde School with Upper Chine, a private school on the Isle of Wight, England where she was Head Girl. She then matriculated at Trinity College, Cambridge as a choral scholar, where she studied maths and theology, graduating with a Bachelor of Arts (BA) degree; and philosophy of religions, graduating with a Master of Philosophy (MPhil) degree. She was a pilot in the University Air Squadron. She then studied religious conflict at the University of Nottingham, graduating with a Master of Arts (MA) degree.

== Career ==
From 2001 to 2003, Arnold was a management consultant with Oliver Wyman and Co. Then, from 2003 to 2006, she worked as a journalist.

=== Diplomatic career ===
In 2006, Arnold joined the Foreign and Commonwealth Office (FCO). From 2006 to 2007, she was assigned to work on Prevent, a counter terrorism strategy. She then worked in the Political, Press & Public Affairs office in Muscat, Oman (2007–2008) and in Baghdad, Iraq (2008). In 2009, she received language training in Persian and was posted to Tehran, Iran. Then, from 2011 to 2013, she was the Head of Communication and a spokesperson in Kabul, Afghanistan. In 2013, she returned to the Foreign and Commonwealth Office in London where she had been appointed Head of its Emerging Powers Initiative. In 2014, she worked on a joint FCO and UK Trade & Investment (UKTI) initiative titled "Philanthropic Investment".

On 23 March 2015, it was announced that Arnold would be the next British Ambassador to Mongolia in succession to Christopher Stuart. She took up the appointment in May 2015. In March 2018 she was replaced by Philip Malone. From 2018, she served as head of the Illegal Wildlife Trade Unit at the Foreign and Commonwealth Office, and then led the United Kingdom's successful bid to chair the 2021 United Nations Climate Change Conference, COP26.

In the New Year Honours of 2019, she was awarded the OBE (Officer of the Order of the British Empire).

=== Academic administration career ===
On 7 March 2019, it was announced that Arnold had been elected as the next Master of St Edmund's College, Cambridge. She took up the appointment on 1 October 2019: she was the college's 15th master, and its first female head. By March 2020, the college was subject to lockdown owing to the COVID-19 pandemic and, since it caters entirely to mature and graduate students, many of whom had no other home to which to travel safely, she unexpectedly found she was (for a short spell) head of the largest Cambridge college, based on numbers of students living onsite. She stepped down in October 2024, after five years in charge, and was succeeded as master by Professor Chris Young.

== Selected works ==
- Arnold, Catherine (2004). Baghdad. Chalfont St. Peter: Bradt Travel Guides. ISBN 978-1841620978.

Academic offices
Preceded by Matthew Bullock	Master of St Edmund's College, Cambridge; 2019–2024	Succeeded by Chris Young
