= James Chau =

British journalist and TV presenter (born 1977)

James Chau (born 11 December 1977) is a British journalist, television presenter, and United Nations goodwill ambassador. He previously anchored the main evening news on state-owned China Central Television (CCTV). In 2009, he was appointed by the United Nations as China's first UNAIDS goodwill ambassador. He wrote a newspaper column for the Chinese Communist Party-owned tabloid Global Times. His appointment as goodwill ambassador to the World Health Organization attracted attention due to his role in presenting forced confessions while working for Chinese state-run broadcaster CGTN.

== Early life and education ==
Chau is from West London. His father was born in Hong Kong, while his mother is from Sumatra, Indonesia. Chau attended the City of London School. He also took piano lessons at the Royal Academy of Music. At age 16, Chau got into a car accident and was hospitalised, after which he quit piano. He went on to study at King's College London and St Edmund's College, Cambridge, where he was Varsity News Features Editor.

== Career ==
=== Television ===
After graduating from Cambridge, and interning at Vogue and Mirror Group Newspapers, he moved to Hong Kong for his first newsroom position. From 2001 he was a reporter and later an anchor at TVB Pearl. Chau joined China Central Television in 2004, where he featured as a main presenter on the 24-hour CCTV News English-language station. Since April 2010, he also co-fronted the channel's flagship China 24 show.

=== UNAIDS Goodwill Ambassador ===
In August 2009, the United Nations announced his appointment as its first UNAIDS Goodwill Ambassador in mainland China.

=== China Current ===
The China Current is a storytelling platform hosted by Chau and containing news, articles, interviews, videos, and podcasts — for global stories on health, nature, innovation, and culture. This platform is supported by China-United States Exchange Foundation.

== See also ==
- Joint United Nations Programme on HIV/AIDS
