= Matthew Bullock (banker) =

British banker and chief executive

The Honourable Matthew Bullock

Master of St Edmund's College, Cambridge
- In office October 2014 – September 2019
- Preceded by: Paul Luzio
- Succeeded by: Catherine Arnold

Matthew Peter Dominic Bullock (born 9 September 1949) is a former banker and chief executive. From 2014 until 2019, he was Master of St Edmund's College, Cambridge.

The son of the historian Alan Bullock and his wife Hilda (née Handy), he was educated at Magdalen College School, Oxford and Peterhouse, Cambridge, graduating with a degree in History in 1970. From 1999 to 2011 he was the Chief Executive of Norwich and Peterborough Building Society. In 2011 the building society was fined £1.4 million by the Financial Services Authority for mis-selling high-risk investments to 3,200 customers. The society has made £51 million in compensation payments and the society has apologised for the hardship and anxiety suffered by its customers.

In his role as Master of St Edmund's College he presided over the expansion of the College to incorporate the Mount Pleasant Halls development, as well as the dismissal of an honorary research fellow, Noah Carl, after he was found to have activities and connections linking him to conservative academics. Noah Carl subsequently filed an employment tribunal claim against the university for unfair dismissal.

Academic offices
Preceded by Paul Luzio	Master of St Edmund's College, Cambridge; 2014–2019	Succeeded by Catherine Arnold
