= Derek Burke =

British academic (1930–2019)

Derek Clissold Burke CBE DL (13 February 1930 – 15 March 2019) was a British academic who served as vice-chancellor of the University of East Anglia from 1987 to 1995.

He was educated at Bishop Vesey's Grammar School and the University of Birmingham (BSc, PhD). He began his career as a research fellow in chemistry at Yale, before becoming a lecturer in biological chemistry at the University of Aberdeen. He then served as Professor of Biological Sciences at the University of Warwick from 1969 to 1982, and Eleanor Roosevelt fellow at the University of Colorado from 1975 to 1976. He was appointed Vice-Chancellor of the University of East Anglia in 1987 and held the post until 1995. He was appointed a CBE in 1994 and is a deputy lieutenant of Norfolk. He lived in Cringleford. He was an Honorary Fellow of St Edmund's College, Cambridge.

Burke died on 15 March 2019.

== Publications ==
- Creation and Evolution (1985)
- Strategic Church Leadership (with Robin Gill, 1996)
- Cybernauts Awake! (1999)
