= Oliver Kemp =

British diplomat (1916–1996)

Oliver Kemp CMG OBE

British Ambassador to Mongolia
- In office 1967–1968
- Preceded by: Heath Mason
- Succeeded by: Roland Carter

British Ambassador to Togo
- In office 1962–1965
- Preceded by: J.H. Adam Watson
- Succeeded by: William Wilson

Personal details
- Born: 12 September 1916
- Died: 2 November 1996 (aged 80)
- Children: 2
- Education: Queen's College, Oxford
- Occupation: Diplomat

Oliver Kemp (12 September 1916 – 2 November 1996) was a British diplomat who served as ambassador to Togo from 1962 to 1965 and ambassador to Mongolia from 1967 to 1968.

== Early life and education ==
Kemp was born on 12 September 1916, the son of Walter Kemp. He was educated at Wakefield Grammar School and Queen’s College, Oxford.

== Career ==
Kemp entered the Foreign Service in 1945 after serving with the Armed Forces during World War II and was posted to Moscow in 1946, and then Alexandria in 1948 where he was consul. After being promoted to first secretary in 1949, he was appointed consul in Surabaya, before he returned to the Foreign Office as assistant to the labour adviser in 1953. In 1956, he was posted to Cairo.

From 1957 to 1958, he served as chargé d’affaires in Yemen. He was expelled by the Yemeni authorities in 1958 for alleged "suspicious contacts" with anti-government elements although no evidence was produced. From 1958 to 1960, he served as first secretary and head of chancery in Laos. In 1962, following the establishment of an Embassy in Togo, he was appointed ambassador to Togo and consul-general there succeeding the chargé d’affaires, a post he held until 1964.

He then served as head of the UK delegation to the European Coal and Steel Community and deputy head of the UK delegation to the European Communities in Luxembourg from 1964 to 1967. From 1967 to 1968, he was ambassador to Mongolia, before he returned to the Foreign and Commonwealth Office where he worked in the European affairs department dealing with Community law and the Treaty of Accession.

After retiring from the service, Kemp went to Brussels where, from 1973 to 1981, he served as director of the British Steel Corporation establishing links with the European Communities and the organisation representing steel producers at a time of a steel shortages in the UK.

== Personal life and death ==
Kemp married Henrietta Taylor in 1940 and they had two sons.

Kemp died on 2 November 1996, aged 80.

== Honours ==
Kemp was appointed Companion of the Order of St Michael and St George (CMG) in the 1969 Birthday Honours. He was appointed Officer of the Order of the British Empire (OBE) in the 1960 New Year Honours.

== See also ==
- Togo–United Kingdom relations
- Mongolia–United Kingdom relations

Diplomatic posts
Preceded by J.H. Adam Watson	British Ambassador to Togo; 1962–1965	Succeeded by William Wilson
Preceded by Heath Mason	British Ambassador to Mongolia; 1967–1968	Succeeded by Roland Carter
