= Chris Young (academic) =

British academic

Master of St Edmund's College, Cambridge
- Incumbent
- Assumed office 2024
- Preceded by: Catherine Arnold

Christopher Young is a British academic. He is the current Master of St Edmund's College, Cambridge, having succeeded Catherine Arnold in 2024.

Young is Professor of Modern and Medieval German Studies at the University of Cambridge and Head of the School of Arts and Humanities.
