= C. J. Ryan =

Scottish priest and scholar of Italian

The Reverend Professor C. J. Ryan
- Born: Christopher John Ryan; 31 October 1943; Clydebank, Dunbartonshire, Scotland
- Died: 20 February 2004 (aged 60); Cambridge, Cambridgeshire, England
- Occupations: Priest and scholar
- Title: Professor of Italian
- Spouse: Henrietta (m. 1987)
- Children: Three

Academic background
- Education: St Mary's College, Blairs
- Alma mater: Pontifical Gregorian University; Pontifical Scots College; University of Glasgow; St Edmund's College, Cambridge
- Thesis: The Theme of Free Will in Dante's Minor Works, with Particular Reference to Aspects of the Cultural Background (1977)
- Doctoral advisor: Fr Kenelm Foster OP

Academic work
- Discipline: Italian studies; Medieval studies
- Sub-discipline: Dante; Thomas Aquinas; Michelangelo; Medieval thought; Medieval history
- Institutions: St Edmund's College, Cambridge; Pontifical Institute of Mediaeval Studies, University of Toronto; St John's College, Cambridge; University of Sussex; King's College, Cambridge

Ecclesiastical career
- Religion: Christianity
- Church: Roman Catholic Church (to 1986); Church of England (from 1986)
- Ordained: 1968 (priest)

Christopher John Ryan (31 October 1943 – 20 February 2004) was a Scottish priest and scholar of Italian studies. His academic interests included Dante, Thomas Aquinas, and Michelangelo. He was a priest of the Roman Catholic Church between 1968 and 1986, before being received into the Church of England where he served as a priest from 1987 until his death.

== Early life, education, and career ==
Ryan was born on 31 October 1943 in Clydebank, Dunbartonshire, Scotland. He was the youngest of seven children of a devout Roman Catholic family. He was educated at St Mary's College, Blairs, a minor seminary near Aberdeen. In 1962, he matriculated into the Pontifical Gregorian University in Rome to continue his studies and into the Pontifical Scots College to train for Holy Orders. He graduated from the Pontifical Gregorian University with a Licentiate of Philosophy (PhL) degree in 1965 and a Licentiate of Sacred Theology (STL) in 1969.

After finishing his training in Rome, Ryan returned to Scotland to study Italian and politics at the University of Glasgow. He graduated with a first class undergraduate Master of Arts (MA Hons) degree in 1972. He then moved to the University of Cambridge where he studied for a Doctor of Philosophy (PhD) degree under the supervision of Fr Kenelm Foster OP at St Edmund's College. His doctoral thesis, titled 'The Theme of Free Will in Dante's Minor Works, with Particular Reference to Aspects of the Cultural Background', was completed in 1977.

Ryan translated the poetry of Michelangelo into English, publishing a volume with Dent in 1997 and a volume with Everyman Poetry in 1998. In 2019, three of Ryan's translations were used as part of the 'Bill Viola / Michelangelo' exhibition at the Royal Academy of Arts in London.

== Ordained ministry ==
=== Roman Catholic Church ===
In 1968, Ryan was ordained into the Roman Catholic Church as a deacon and then as a priest. Rather than enter parish ministry, he was granted permission to continue his academic studies. In 1975, after completing an additional degree and while still working towards his doctorate, he was appointed Dean of St Edmund's College, Cambridge. As dean, he was a Fellow of the college and the priest of its college chapel; St Edmund's is unique in that it is the only college of the University of Cambridge with a Roman Catholic chapel. After five years, in 1981, he moved to Canada where he became a Fellow in Western Theology at the Pontifical Institute of Mediaeval Studies of the University of Toronto. There, he taught courses on Dante, Medieval thought, and Medieval history.

=== Church of England ===
It was during his time in Canada that Ryan began to question "many aspects of Roman Catholic teaching" including Papal infallibility. In 1986, he left the Roman Catholic Church, having flown to Scotland to inform his family face to face. That year, he was received into the Church of England by Peter Walker, the then Bishop of Ely.

In 1987, Ryan moved from Canada to England. From 1987 to 1990, he held a licence to officiate in the Diocese of Ely; this allowed him to serve as an Anglican priest within the diocese. From 1987 to 1988, he held the Naden Research Studentship in Theology at St John's College, Cambridge. From 1988 to 1990, he was a lecturer in Italian at the University of Cambridge.

In January 1991, Ryan moved to the University of Sussex where he had been appointed a senior lecturer in Italian. From 1991 to 2002, he also held Permission to Officiate in the Diocese of Oxford. He was appointed Professor of Italian in 1994. During this time, he served as chairman of the Italian group with the School of European Studies. In 2002, he left Sussex and was appointed professor emeritus.

In 2002, Ryan returned to the University of Cambridge to take up the appointment of Dean of College of King's College, Cambridge. As such, he "was the first former Roman Catholic priest to be appointed dean of the college since Tudor times". This also made him 'the first priest since the Reformation to have been Dean of both a Roman Catholic college and an Anglican college in the same university'. From 2002, he once more held a licence to officiate in the Diocese of Ely.

== Death ==
Ryan died on 20 February 2004, aged 60, after a short illness.

== Personal life ==
In 1987, Ryan married Henrietta McBurney during a service at St George's Chapel, Windsor Castle. For most of their marriage, they lived at Windsor Castle, where Henrietta worked as Deputy Curator of the Royal Collection of Prints and Drawings. They had three children together: a daughter and two sons.

== Selected works ==
- Ryan, Christopher, ed. (1989). Religious Roles of the Papacy: Ideals and Realities, 1150–1300. Toronto: Pontifical Institute for Medieval Studies. ISBN 978-1459332966.
- Dante (1989). Ryan, Christopher (ed.). The Banquet. Saratoga, CA: Anma Libri. ISBN 978-0915838479.
- Ryan, Christopher (1998). The poetry of Michelangelo: an introduction. London: Athlone. ISBN 978-0485115291.
- Ryan, Christopher (2013). Took, John (ed.). Dante and Aquinas: a study of nature and grace in the Comedy. London: UCL Arts & Humanities Publications. ISBN 978-1909188037.
- Michelangelo, The Poetry. Translated and edited by Christopher Ryan. London: J M Dent, 1997. ISBN 978-0460878784.
