= Molecular Membrane Biology =

- Discipline: Cellular and molecular biology
- Language: English
- Edited by: Vincent Postis

Publication details
- History: 1978-present
- Publisher: Taylor & Francis
- Frequency: Annual
- Open access: yes
- Impact factor: 1.647 (2018)

Standard abbreviations
- ISO 4: Mol. Membr. Biol.

Indexing
- ISSN: 0968-7688 (print); 1464-5203 (web)

Links
- Journal homepage

Molecular Membrane Biology is a peer-reviewed scientific journal that publishes review articles of biomembranes at the molecular level. It is published by Taylor & Francis. The editor-in-chief is Vincent Postis.
