= Christopher Stuart =

British diplomat

The Rt Hon Christopher Charles Stuart was the British Ambassador to Mongolia from May 2012 to February 2015.

He first joined the FCO in 1997, and had served in both the UK, and the Consulate General in Osaka and Embassy in Tokyo, Japan, before becoming the British ambassador.

He has a son, William, who was born in 1993. William joined his father in Japan from 1997 until 2009, whereafter he attended Oakham School. Having completed his schooling, he attended Newcastle University where he read History and Archaeology. William completed his education with a 2:1 BA (Hons), before attending the Royal Military Academy Sandhurst. He is currently a Captain serving with the Royal Regiment of Artillery.
