= Thomas Haining =

UK diplomat

Thomas Nivison Haining CMG

British Ambassador to the Mongolian People's Republic
- In office 1979–1982

Foreign Service
- In office 1952–1982

Personal details
- Born: 15 March 1927
- Died: 17 July 2005 (age 78)
- Education: University of Edinburgh; University of Göttingen
- Awards: Most Distinguished Order of Saint Michael and Saint George

Thomas Nivison Haining CMG (15 March 1927 – 17 July 2005), was a British diplomat. He was ambassador to Mongolia from 1979 to 1982.

== Early life, family and education ==
Haining was educated at University of Edinburgh and University of Göttingen.

== Career ==
In 1952, he entered the British government's Foreign Service, later transferring to the Diplomatic Service. He saw service in Vienna, Moscow, Rome and New York. In 1968, he was First Secretary (Information) with his wife as part of the UK's permanent mission to the United Nations in New York.

From 1979 to 1982 he was British ambassador to the Mongolian People's Republic. It was a "place that fitted him like a glove". In a comment on the Times obituary for the Rev Canon Eric Staples, Haining recalls that Staples accompanied him "in full canonical dress" on official calls on the Hambo Lama, the abbot of the Gandangchinlig Monastery. In 1992, Haining visited the Gandang again, on the occasion of the enthronement of a new abbot.

After retirement in 1982, Haining settled in Brechin in Angus, Scotland. He became an honorary research associate in history at the University of Aberdeen and honorary president of the Chinese Studies Group. He wrote about Mongolia and the history of the Mongols in academic journals, reviewed books and discussed modern Mongolia being caught between Russian and Chinese influences.

In 1991, Blackwell published Genghis Khan: His Life and Legacy by Paul Ratchnevsky, which Haining had edited, translated from the German and contributed to. (This had been first published as Činggis-Kahn: sein Leben und Wirken, in 1983.) The Royal Asiatic Society reviewer commented: "The translation is excellent. Mr Haining is to be congratulated on his contribution to what is in many respects an improvement even on Ratchnevsky's splendid work." Genghis Khan is now published by Wiley-Blackwell.

== Honours ==
- Most Distinguished Order of Saint Michael and Saint George (1983)

== Personal life ==
Haining married in 1955 and had a son, Nicholas. His wife, Dorothy Patricia, known as Pat, died at the age of 97 on 11 May 2025.
