= List of ambassadors of the United Kingdom to Mongolia =

The ambassador of the United Kingdom to Mongolia is the United Kingdom's foremost diplomatic representative in Mongolia, and head of the UK's diplomatic mission there. The official title is His Britannic Majesty's Ambassador to Mongolia.

Britain was the first Western country to recognise an independent Mongolia when diplomatic relations were established in January 1963 with appointment of the British chargé d'affaires in Peking, Mr Terence Garvey, to Ulaanbaatar as non-resident ambassador. In 1964 Mr (later Sir) Reginald Hibbert became resident chargé d'affaires in Ulaanbaatar. He was succeeded by Mr Heath Mason, who was appointed as the first resident British ambassador in 1966. In 1968 the Embassy moved to a new building on Peace Avenue where it is still located today.

== List of heads of mission ==
=== Ambassadors ===
- 1963–1964: Terence Garvey (non-resident)
- 1964–1966: Reginald Hibbert (chargé d'affaires)
- 1966–1967: Heath Mason
- 1967–1968: Oliver Kemp
- 1969–1971: Roland Carter
- 1971–1974: John Colvin
- 1974–1977: Myles Ponsonby
- 1977–1979: Julian Hartland-Swann
- 1979–1982: Thomas Haining
- 1982–1984: James Paterson
- 1984–1987: Allan Butler (diplomat)
- 1987–1989: Guy Hart
- 1989–1991: David Sprague
- 1991–1993: Anthony Morey
- 1994–1997: Ian Sloane
- 1997–1999: John Durham
- 1999–2001: Kay Coombs
- 2001–2004: Philip Rouse
- 2004–2006: Richard Austen
- 2006–2008: Christopher Osborne
- 2008–2009: Thorhilda Abbott-Watt
- 2009–2011: William Dickson
- 2011–2012: Thorhilda Abbott-Watt
- 2012–2015: Christopher Stuart
- 2015–2018: Catherine Arnold
- 2018-2023: Philip Malone
- 2023–present: Fiona Blyth
