= List of University of Cambridge people =

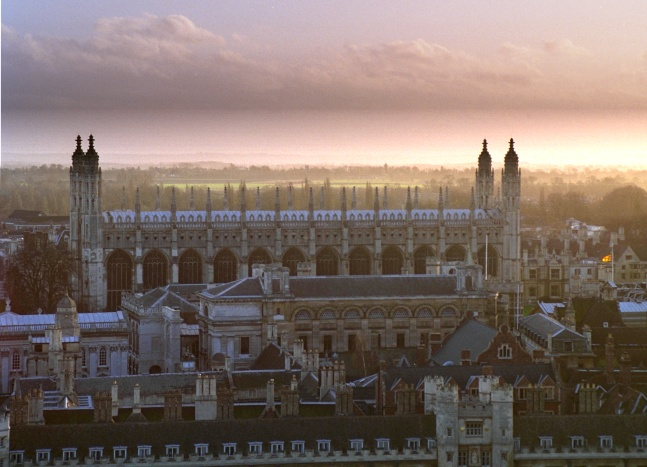
The University of Cambridge in Cambridge, England

This is a list of notable alumni from the University of Cambridge, featuring members of the University of Cambridge segregated in accordance with their fields of achievement. The individual must have either studied at the university (although they may not necessarily have taken a degree), or worked at the university in an academic capacity; others have held fellowships at one of the university's colleges. Honorary fellows or those awarded an honorary degree are not included and neither are non-executive chancellors. Lecturers without long-term posts at the university also do not feature, although official visiting fellows and visiting professors do.

The list has been divided into categories indicating the field of activity in which people have become well known. Many of the university's alumni/ae have attained a level of distinction in more than one field. These individuals may appear under two categories. In general, however, an attempt has been made to put individuals in the category with which they are most associated.

Cantabrigians is a term for members of the university derived from its Latin name Cantabrigia, a medieval Latin name for Cambridge.

== Politics and royalty ==
=== Monarchs ===
- Charles Vyner Brooke, Rajah of Sarawak (Magdalene)
- Edward VII of the United Kingdom (Trinity)
- George VI of the United Kingdom (Trinity)
- Charles III of the United Kingdom (Trinity)
- Kumar Shri Ranjitsinhji, Maharaja Jam Sahib of Nawanagar, India (Trinity)
- Letsie III of Lesotho (Wolfson)
- Margrethe II of Denmark (Girton)
- Mutesa II of Buganda, Kabaka of Buganda (Magdalene)
- Muwenda Mutebi II, Kabaka of Buganda (Magdalene)
- Peter II of Yugoslavia (Clare)

=== Royalty ===
- Prince Albert Victor, Duke of Clarence and Avondale (Trinity)
- Prince Andrew of Yugoslavia (Clare)
- Prince Asfa-Wossen Asserate of Ethiopia (Magdalene)
- Prince Chula Chakrabongse of Thailand (Trinity)
- Prince Chudadhuj Dharadilok of Thailand (Magdalene)
- Dina al-Hussein of Jordan (Princess Dina Abdul Hamid after 1957 divorce) (Girton)
- Prince Edward, Duke of Edinburgh (Jesus)
- Prince Henry, Duke of Gloucester (Trinity)
- Sao Hkun Hkio, Saopha of Mongmit, 4th foreign minister of Myanmar
- Fra' Matthew Festing, Prince and Grand Master of the Order of Malta (St John's)
- Prince Ra'ad bin Zeid of Iraq (Christ's)
- Princess Rahma bint Hassan of Jordan (Trinity)
- Prince Rashid bin Hassan of Jordan (Caius)
- Prince Richard, Duke of Gloucester (Magdalene)
- Shaikh Salman bin Hamad bin Isa Al-Khalifa, crown prince of Bahrain (Queens')
- Princess Sarvath El Hassan of Jordan (unknown)
- Sofía, Queen Consort of Spain (Fitzwilliam)
- Princess Takamado of Japan (Girton)
- Prince Tomislav of Yugoslavia (Clare)
- Prince Tunku Abdul Rahman of Kedah (St Catharine's)
- William, Prince of Wales (without college membership, de facto St John's)
- Prince William of Gloucester (Magdalene)
- Prince William Frederick, Duke of Gloucester and Edinburgh (Trinity)
- Prince Zeid bin Ra'ad of Iraq (Christ's)

=== Diplomats ===
==== Viceroys ====
- Clement Francis Cornwall (Trinity/Magdalene), lieutenant governor of British Columbia (1881–1887)
- Charles Cornwallis (Clare), governor-general of India (1786–1793)
- Freeman Freeman-Thomas, 1st Marquess of Willingdon (Trinity), 13th governor general of Canada (1926–1931)
- Sir Robert George Howe (St Catharine's), governor general of the Sudan (1947–1955)
- David Lloyd Johnston (Trinity Hall), 28th governor general of Canada (2010–2017)
- Sir William Manning (Fitzwilliam), governor of Jamaica (1913–1918) and governor of Ceylon (1918–1925)
- Louis Mountbatten (Christ's), last viceroy of India (1947); first governor general of India (1947–1948)
- Sarojini Naidu (Girton), first woman to become the president of the Indian National Congress (1925) and governor of Uttar Pradesh (1947–1949)
- Vere Ponsonby, 9th Earl of Bessborough (Trinity), 14th governor general of Canada (1931–1935)
- Shenton Thomas (Queens'), last governor of the Straits Settlements (1934–1942, 1945–1946) and governor of the Gold Coast (1932–1934)
- John Winthrop (Trinity), founder and first governor of Massachusetts (1630–1648)

==== Ambassadors ====
- Nigel Baker (Caius), UK ambassador to Slovakia (2020–)
- Sir Laurie Bristow (Trinity), UK ambassador to Russia (2016–2020)
- Laura Clarke, UK high commissioner to New Zealand (2018–2022)
- Colin Crooks (Fitzwilliam), UK ambassador to North Korea (2018–2022)
- Brian Davidson (Trinity), UK ambassador to Thailand (2016–2021)
- Janet Douglas (St Catharine's), UK high commissioner to Barbados (2017–2020)
- Hugh Elliott (Trinity), UK ambassador to Spain (2019–2024)
- Nicholas Hopton (Magdalene), UK ambassador to Libya (2019–2021)
- Frances Lanitou, ambassador of the Republic of Cyprus to countries including Belgium, Bosnia and Herzegovina, China, Hungary, the Grand Duchy of Luxembourg, Moldova and the Netherlands
- Paul Madden (Caius), UK ambassador to Japan (2017–2021)
- Jane Owen (Trinity), UK ambassador to Switzerland (2018–2023)
- Jacqueline Perkins, UK ambassador to Belarus (2019–2024)
- Karen Pierce (Girton), UK ambassador to the United States (2020–)
- Antony Stokes (Queens'), UK ambassador to Cuba (2016–2022)
- Leigh Turner (Downing), UK ambassador to Austria (2016–2021)
- Caroline Wilson (Downing), UK ambassador to China (2020–)

=== Heads of state and heads of government ===
- Fakhruddin Ali Ahmed (St Catharine's), president of India 1974–1977
- Rupiah Banda (Wolfson), president of Zambia 2008–2011
- Sir Francis Bell (St John's), Prime Minister of New Zealand 1925
- Stanley Bruce (Trinity Hall), prime minister of Australia 1923–1929
- Erskine Hamilton Childers (Trinity), president of Ireland 1973–1974
- Oliver Cromwell (Sidney Sussex), first lord protector
- Alfred Domett (St John's), prime minister of New Zealand 1862–1863
- Luc Frieden (Queens'), prime minister of Luxembourg since 2023
- Rajiv Gandhi (Trinity), prime minister of India 1984–1989
- Salman bin Hamad Al Khalifa (Queens'), prime minister of Bahrain since 2020
- Awn Al-Khasawneh (Queens'), prime minister of Jordan 2011–2012
- John Kotelawala (Christ's), prime minister of Ceylon 1953–1956
- Lee Hsien Loong (Trinity), prime minister of Singapore 2004–2024
- Lee Kuan Yew (Fitzwilliam), prime minister of Singapore 1959–1990
- Elijah Mudenda (Peterhouse), prime minister of Zambia 1975–1977
- Khawaja Nazimuddin (Trinity Hall), prime minister of Pakistan 1951–1953
- Jawaharlal Nehru (Trinity), prime minister of India 1947–1964
- Anand Panyarachun (Trinity), prime minister of Thailand 1991 – early 1992, later 1992
- Tunku Abdul Rahman (St Catharine's), prime minister of Malaysia 1957–1970
- George Maxwell Richards (Pembroke), president of Trinidad and Tobago 2003–2013
- Samir Rifai (Trinity), prime minister of Jordan 2009–2011
- Guy Scott (Trinity Hall), president of Zambia 2014–2015
- Dudley Senanayake (Corpus Christi), prime minister of Ceylon 1952, 1960, 1965–1970
- Tharman Shanmugaratnam (Wolfson), president of Singapore since 2023
- Dr Manmohan Singh (St John's), prime minister of India 2004–2014
- Jan Smuts (Christ's), prime minister of South Africa 1939–1948
- William Waddington (Trinity), prime minister of France 1879

==== British prime ministers ====
- Robert Walpole (King's), first prime minister 1721–1742
- Thomas Pelham-Holles, 1st Duke of Newcastle (Clare), prime minister 1754–1756, 1757–1762
- Charles Watson-Wentworth, 2nd Marquess of Rockingham (St John's), prime minister 1765–1766, 1782
- Augustus FitzRoy, 3rd Duke of Grafton (Peterhouse), prime minister 1768–1770
- William Pitt the Younger (Pembroke), prime minister 1783–1801, 1804–1806
- Spencer Perceval (Trinity), prime minister 1809–1812
- Frederick John Robinson, 1st Viscount Goderich (St John's), prime minister 1827–1828
- Charles Grey, 2nd Earl Grey (Trinity), prime minister 1830–1834
- William Lamb, 2nd Viscount Melbourne (Trinity), prime minister 1834, 1835–1841
- George Hamilton-Gordon, 4th Earl of Aberdeen (St John's), prime minister 1852–1855
- Henry John Temple, 3rd Viscount Palmerston (St John's), prime minister 1855–1858, 1859–1865
- Arthur Balfour (Trinity), prime minister 1902–1905
- Henry Campbell-Bannerman (Trinity), prime minister 1905–1908
- Stanley Baldwin (Trinity), prime minister 1923–1924, 1924–1929, 1935–1937
- Andy Burnham (Fitzwilliam), prime minister 2026–present

=== Signatories of the American Declaration of Independence ===
- Thomas Lynch Jr. (Caius)
- Arthur Middleton (Trinity Hall)
- Thomas Nelson Jr. (Christ's)

=== From Soviet Union ===
Known:

- Anthony Blunt (Trinity)
- Guy Burgess (Trinity)
- John Cairncross (Trinity)
- Donald Maclean (Trinity Hall)
- Alan Nunn May (Trinity Hall)
- Kim Philby (Trinity)
- Michael Whitney Straight (Trinity)

Suspected

- Victor Rothschild (Trinity)

(for other suspects, see Cambridge Five)

=== Other political figures ===
==== A–D ====
- Diane Abbott (Newnham), British shadow cabinet member and Labour Party leadership contender
- Colin Forbes Adam (King's), civil servant in the Indian Imperial Civil Service
- Aitzaz Ahsan (Downing), interior minister of Pakistan (1988–1990)
- Mani Shankar Aiyar (Trinity Hall), Indian minister of Panchayati Raj (2004–2009)
- Augustus Molade Akiwumi (Fitzwilliam), speaker of the Parliament of Ghana (1958–1960)
- Awn Shawkat Al-Khasawneh (Queens'), Jordanian foreign minister (1980–1990), royal state adviser on International Law
- Musa Alami (unknown), Palestinian nationalist, major contributor to the White Paper of 1939
- Choudhary Rahmat Ali (Emmanuel), Pakistani independence leader, credited with inventing the name "Pakistan"
- Gilberto Arias (Hughes Hall), ambassador of Panama to the United Kingdom (2009–2011)
- Jorge Arreaza, Venezuelan minister of foreign affairs (2017–2021), former vice president (2013–2016)
- Sri Aurobindo (King's), member of the Indian National Congress and independence leader
- Nathaniel Bacon (Sidney Sussex), early American rebel, instigator of Bacon's Rebellion of 1676
- Steve Barclay (Peterhouse), Conservative MP and secretary of state for exiting the European Union (2018–2020)
- Joseph Baptista (Fitzwilliam), founder of the Indian Home Rule Movement (1916) and mayor of Bombay (1925–1926)
- Johan Baverbrant (St Edmund's), Swedish representative on the Council of Europe
- Chris Bentley (Wolfson), minister of Aboriginal Affairs in Ontario (2010–11, 2012–2013)
- Augustine Birrell (Trinity Hall), British chief secretary for Ireland (1907–1916)
- Hans Blix (Trinity Hall), UN weapons inspector, Swedish foreign minister (1978–1979)
- Richard Blumenthal (Trinity), US senator from Connecticut (2011–)
- Maria Böhmer (unknown), current minister of state in the German Chancellery
- Subhas Chandra Bose (Fitzwilliam), president of the Indian National Congress (1938–1939) and leader of the Indian National Army
- Kate Brandt, first American chief sustainability officer
- William Bridgeman, 1st Viscount Bridgeman, British home secretary (1922–1924)
- Leon Brittan (Trinity), British home secretary (1983–1985) and vice-president of the European Commission (1999)
- Annette Brooke (Hughes Hall), Liberal Democrats MP for Mid Dorset and North Poole
- Andy Burnham (Fitzwilliam), British health secretary (2009–2010), mayor of Greater Manchester (2017–2026) and Prime Minister since 2026
- Rab Butler (Pembroke), British deputy prime minister (1962–1963), home secretary (1957–1962), foreign secretary (1963–1964) and chancellor of the exchequer (1951–1955)
- Jerzy Buzek (unknown), president of the European Parliament (2009–2012)
- P. K. van der Byl (Pembroke), Rhodesian foreign minister (1974–1979)
- Vince Cable (Fitzwilliam), deputy leader of the Liberal Democrats (2006–2010) and business secretary (2010–2015)
- Alastair Campbell (Caius), press secretary and director of communications and strategy under Tony Blair
- Robert Carr (Caius), British home secretary (1972–1974)
- Fernando María Castiella y Maíz (unknown), Spanish foreign minister (1957–1969)
- William Cecil (St John's), chief adviser to Queen Elizabeth I, secretary of state (1550–1553 and 1558–1572)
- Austen Chamberlain (Trinity), British chancellor of the exchequer (1903–1905, 1919–1921), secretary of state for India (1915–1917), leader of the Conservative Party (1921–1922), foreign secretary (1924–1929) and Nobel Peace Prize winner (1925)
- Somnath Chatterjee (Jesus), speaker of the Lok Sabha in the Indian Government (2004–2009)
- Erskine Childers (Trinity), Irish independence leader, director of publicity for the First Irish Parliament (1919–1922)
- Charles Clarke (King's), British home secretary (2004–2006) and education secretary (2002–2004)
- Kenneth Clarke (Caius), British chancellor of the exchequer (1993–1997), home secretary (1992–1993), education secretary (1990–1992) and health secretary (1988–1990)
- Thomas Clarkson (St John's), slavery abolitionist
- Nick Clegg (Robinson), leader of the British Liberal Democrats (2007–2015) and deputy prime minister (2010–2015)
- Paul Clement (Darwin), solicitor general of the United States (2004–2008)
- Sarah Cooper-Lesadd, Member of the Senedd for Pen-y-bont Bro Morgannwg
- Jo Cox (Pembroke), member of Parliament for the Batley and Spen constituency from May 2015 until her murder in June 2016
- Robert Crewe-Milnes, 1st Marquess of Crewe, British secretary of state for India (1910–1911, 1911–1915), ambassador to France (1922–1928) and secretary of state for war (1931)
- Hugh Dalton (King's), chairman of the Labour Party (1936–1937) and British chancellor of the exchequer (1945–1947)
- Sir C. D. Deshmukh (Jesus), finance minister in the Indian Government (1951–1957)
- Robert Devereux, 2nd Earl of Essex (Trinity), favourite of and adviser to Queen Elizabeth I, Earl Marshal (1597–1601)
- Gamini Dissanayake (Wolfson), Sri Lankan leader of the opposition (1994)
- Lawrence Dundas, 2nd Marquess of Zetland (Trinity), British secretary of state for India (1935–1940)

==== E–M ====
- Abba Eban (Queens'/Pembroke), Israeli deputy prime minister (1963–1966), education minister (1960–1963) and foreign minister (1966–1974)
- Elizabeth Ebosele, Nigerian public administrator
- James Chuter Ede (Christ's), British home secretary (1945–1951)
- Steven Engel (unknown), United States assistant attorney general for the Office of Legal Counsel under the first Trump administration (2017–2021)
- Femi Fani-Kayode (Pembroke), Nigerian minister of aviation (2006–2007) and special assistant to the president (2003–2006)
- Remi Fani-Kayode (Downing), Nigerian minister for local government affairs (1963–1966)
- Kate Forbes (Selwyn), Scottish cabinet secretary for finance (2020–2023), deputy first minister of Scotland (2024–)
- Peter Fragiskatos, Canadian MP
- Karen-Christine Friele (unknown), Norwegian gay rights activist, leader of Forbundet av 1948 (1966–1971)
- Rahul Gandhi (Trinity), general secretary of the Indian National Congress (2004–2013)
- Michael Gau (Hughes Hall), vice chairman of Aviation Safety Council of the Republic of China
- Sir John Gilmour, 2nd Baronet (Trinity Hall), British home secretary (1932–1935)
- Jarosław Gowin, former deputy prime minister of Poland
- Chris Grayling (Sidney Sussex), lord high chancellor of Great Britain (2012–2015) and transport minister (2016–2019)
- Nick Griffin (Downing), leader of the British National Party (1999–2014)
- Matt Hancock (Christ's), British health secretary (2018–2021)
- William Harcourt (Trinity), British home secretary (1880–1885), chancellor of the exchequer (1892–1895) and leader of the opposition (1896–1898)
- William Hare, 5th Earl of Listowel (Magdalene), the last British secretary of state for India (1947) and the last governor-general of Ghana (1957–1960)
- John Healey (Christ's), British MP
- Francis Higginson (Jesus), first minister of Salem, Massachusetts (1629–1630)
- Geoff Hoon (Jesus), British secretary of state for defence (1999–2005) and secretary of state for transport (2008–2009)
- Michael Howard (Peterhouse), leader of the Conservative Party (2003–2005), British home secretary (1993–1997)
- Geoffrey Howe (Trinity Hall), British chancellor of the exchequer (1979–1983), foreign secretary (1983–1989), and leader of the House of Commons and deputy prime minister (1989–1990)
- Douglas Hurd (Trinity), British home secretary (1985–1989) and foreign secretary (1989–1995)
- Michael Ignatieff (King's), leader of the Liberal Party of Canada (2008–2011)
- Vane Ivanović (Peterhouse), co-founder of the European Movement (1947), pro-Yugoslavia activist
- Vladeta Janković (unknown), co-founder and deputy president of Democratic Party of Serbia (1992), Yugoslav ambassador to the United Kingdom
- Vuk Jeremić (Queens'), foreign minister in the Government of Serbia (2007–2012)
- Michael Johnson (unknown), member of the Australian House of Representatives (2001–2010)
- Suematsu Kenchō (St John's), Japanese home minister (1900–1901) and minister of communication (1898)
- Norman Lamont (Fitzwilliam), British chancellor of the exchequer (1990–1993)
- John Lehman (Caius), US secretary of the Navy (1981–1987)
- Brian Lenihan Jnr (Sidney Sussex), Irish justice minister (2007–2008) and finance minister (2008–2011)
- Alan Leong (Hughes Hall), leader of the Civic Party of Hong Kong (2011–2016)
- Arthur Li (unknown), member of the Executive Council of Hong Kong; Hong Kong secretary for education and manpower (2002–2007)
- Sir David Li (Selwyn), member of the Legislative Council of Hong Kong and former member of the Executive Council of Hong Kong
- David Lidington (Sidney Sussex), Conservative MP and chancellor of the Duchy of Lancaster (2018–2019)
- Peter Lilley (Clare), British secretary of state for trade and industry (1990–1992) and secretary of state for Social Security (1992–1997)
- Selwyn Lloyd (Magdalene), British foreign secretary (1955–1960), chancellor of the exchequer (1960–1962), and speaker of the House of Commons (1971–1976)
- Gwilym Lloyd George (Jesus), British home secretary (1954–1957) and younger son of David Lloyd George
- Roy MacLaren (St Catharine's), Canadian minister of national revenue (1984–1985) and minister of international trade (1993–1996)
- Iain Macleod (Caius), British chancellor of the exchequer (1970)
- Paul Magnette, president of the Socialist Party of Belgium and former minister-president of Wallonia
- Mark Malloch Brown, Baron Malloch-Brown (Magdalene), minister of state in the Foreign and Commonwealth Office, and previously United Nations deputy secretary-general
- Inagaki Manjirō (Caius), Japan's first deputy minister resident to the Kingdom of Siam on 31 March 1897; minister plenipotentiary
- Paula Marcela Moreno Zapata (Hughes Hall), minister of culture, Colombia; Hubert H. Humphrey Fellow, MIT
- Allama Mashriqi (Christ's), founder of the Khaksar movement (1930)
- Francis Maude (Corpus Christi), chairman of the Conservative Party (2005–2007)
- John McCallum (Queens'), Canadian minister of national defence (2002–2003) and minister of national revenue (2004–2006)
- Reginald McKenna (Trinity Hall), British home secretary (1911–1915) and chancellor of the exchequer (1915–1916)
- David Mellor (Christ's), British Conservative MP and chief secretary to the treasury (1990–1992)
- Andrew Mitchell (Jesus), British secretary of state for international development (2010–2012)
- Edwin Montagu (Trinity), British secretary of state for India (1917–1922)
- Andrew Murrison (Hughes Hall), Conservative Party MP for Westbury and former minister of state for Northern Ireland
- R. M. Muzumdar, IOFS officer; second Indian director general of the Indian Ordnance Factories

==== N–Z ====
- Marty Natalegawa (Corpus Christi), foreign minister in the Indonesian Government (2009–2014)
- Philip Noel-Baker (King's), British commonwealth secretary (1947–1950), chair of the Labour Party (1946–1947) and Nobel Peace Prize winner (1959)
- Simeon Nyachae (Churchill), Kenyan presidential candidate (2002)
- David Owen (Sidney Sussex), co-founder and leader of the Social Democratic Party (1983–1987 & 1988–1990), British foreign secretary (1977–1979)
- Charles Stewart Parnell (Magdalene), leader of the Irish Nationalist Party (1882–1891)
- Matthew Parris (Clare), British political analyst, member of Parliament for West Derbyshire (1979–1986)
- Sir Emyr Jones Parry (St Catharine's), British permanent representative to the United Nations (2003–2007) and NATO (2001–2003)
- Sandeep Pathak (PhD from University of Cambridge 2011), Indian politician, member of Parliament, Rajya Sabha
- Frederick Pethick-Lawrence (Trinity), British leader of the opposition (1942) and secretary of state for India and Burma (1945–1947)
- Michael Portillo (Peterhouse), British defence secretary (1995–1997) and employment secretary (1994–1995)
- Enoch Powell (Trinity), British minister of health (1960–1963) and financial secretary to the treasury (1957–1958)
- Francis Pym (Magdalene), British foreign secretary (1982–1983) and leader of the House of Commons (1981–1982)
- Shah Mehmood Qureshi (Corpus Christi), foreign minister in the Pakistani Government (2008–2011, 2018–2022)
- Dominic Raab (Jesus), British secretary of state for exiting the European Union (July–November 2018), foreign secretary (2019–2021), deputy prime minister of the United Kingdom (2021–2023)
- Sir Benegal Rama Rau (King's), Indian ambassador to Japan (1947–1948) and the United States (1948–1949)
- Geoffrey Robinson (Clare), paymaster general in the British Government (1997–1999)
- Gábor Scheiring (Hughes Hall), economist and member of the Hungarian National Assembly
- Tharman Shanmugaratnam (Wolfson), Singapore's education minister (2003–2008) and finance minister (2007–2015)
- Kamalesh Sharma (King's), secretary general of the Commonwealth of Nations (2008–2016)
- Peter Shore (King's), secretary of state for trade (1974–1976) and secretary of state for the environment (1976–1979)
- Shahid Aziz Siddiqi (Wolfson), federal secretary in the Government of Pakistan (1997–2000)
- Arun Singh (St Catharine's), minister of state for defence in the Government of India (1984–1988)
- Chris Smith (Pembroke), British secretary of state for culture, media and sport (1997–2001)
- Chatumongol Sonakul (Trinity), governor of the Bank of Thailand (1998–2001) and minister of labour (2019–2020)
- Gavin Strang (Churchill), British transport minister (1997–1998)
- Sir John Stuttard (Churchill), lord mayor of London 2006/7
- Szeming Sze (Christ's), Chinese representative at the foundation of the United Nations (1945) and co-founder of the World Health Organization (1948)
- Linda Taylor, executive director of the United Nations Office of Administration of Justice
- Sir George Trevelyan, 2nd Baronet (Trinity), secretary of state for Scotland (1886) and Ireland (1882–1884)
- Christopher Tugendhat (Caius), vice-president of the European Commission (1981–1985)
- Andrew Turnbull, Baron Turnbull (Christ's), cabinet secretary and head of the Civil Service
- Tin Tut (unknown), minister of finance in the Government of Myanmar (1946–1947)
- Tom Udall (Downing), US senator from New Mexico (2009–2021)
- Usha Vance (Clare), Second Lady of the United States (2025-)
- Jim Wallace (Downing), leader of the Scottish Liberal Democrats (1992–2005) and deputy first minister of Scotland (1999–2005)
- Francis Walsingham (King's), principal secretary to Elizabeth I of England (1573–1590), "Spymaster"
- William Whitelaw (Trinity), British home secretary (1979–1983) and deputy leader of the Conservative Party (1975–1991)
- William Wilberforce (St John's), slavery abolitionist
- Roger Williams (Pembroke), founder of Rhode Island, advocate of Native Americans
- Yeo Bee Yin (Corpus Christi), minister of energy, science, technology, environment and climate change (Malaysia)

== Clergy and spiritual leaders ==
- Sri Aurobindo (King's)
- Richard Bauckham (Clare/Ridley Hall)
- Edward White Benson (Trinity)
- William Brewster (Peterhouse)
- Arthur Buxton (Trinity/Ridley Hall)
- Donald Coggan (St John's)
- Frederick Cornwallis (Christ's), archbishop of Canterbury
- Thomas Cranmer (Jesus)
- Timothy Dudley-Smith (Pembroke/Ridley Hall)
- Saint John Fisher (Michaelhouse)
- Sir James George Frazer (Trinity)
- Edmund Grindal (Christ's), archbishop of Canterbury
- Nicky Gumbel (Trinity)
- Anne Hollinghurst (Hughes Hall), bishop of Aston
- Fenton John Anthony Hort (Trinity/Emmanuel)
- George Joye (Christ's/Peterhouse)
- Nicky Lee (Trinity)
- J. B. Lightfoot (Trinity)
- Dick Lucas (Trinity/Ridley Hall)
- F. D. Maurice (Trinity/Trinity Hall)
- Handley Moule (Trinity/Ridley Hall), bishop of Durham
- Michael Nazir-Ali (Ridley Hall/Fitzwilliam), bishop of Rochester
- Mike Ovey (Ridley Hall/Trinity)
- Arthur Peacocke (Clare), Templeton Prize winner
- William Perkins (Christ's), Puritan theologian
- Sogyal Rinpoche (Trinity)
- John Robinson (Jesus/Trinity)
- Jonathan Sacks (Caius)
- Solomon Schechter (unknown)
- John Sentamu (Selwyn/Ridley Hall)
- David Sheppard (Trinity Hall/Ridley Hall), bishop of Liverpool
- Shimun XXI Eshai (Westcott House)
- William Robertson Smith (Christ's)
- John Stott (Trinity/Ridley Hall)
- Eckhart Tolle (Caius)
- William Tyndale (unknown)
- Terry Waite (Trinity Hall)
- Brooke Foss Westcott (Trinity)
- Philip William Wheeldon, bishop of Whitby and bishop of Kimberley and Kuruman (Clifton/Downing)
- William Whewell (Trinity)
- Archbishop John Whitgift (Queens'/Pembroke/Trinity)
- Roger Williams (Pembroke)
- Richard Williamson (Clare)

=== Archbishops of Canterbury ===
- Thomas Langton (Clare/Pembroke), 1501–1501
- Thomas Cranmer (Jesus), 1533–1555
- Matthew Parker (Corpus), 1559–1575
- Edmund Grindal (Christ's), 1576–1583
- John Whitgift (Queens'/Pembroke/Peterhouse), 1583–1604
- Richard Bancroft (Christ's/Jesus), 1604–1610
- William Sancroft (Emmanuel), 1677–1690
- John Tillotson (Clare), 1691–1694
- Thomas Tenison (Corpus), 1696–1715
- Thomas Herring (Jesus), 1747–1757
- Matthew Hutton (Jesus), 1757–1758
- Frederick Cornwallis (Christ's), 1768–1783
- Charles Manners-Sutton (Emmanuel), 1805–1828
- John Bird Sumner (King's), 1848–1862
- Edward White Benson (Trinity), 1883–1896
- Michael Ramsey (Magdalene), 1961–1974
- Donald Coggan (St John's), 1974–1980
- Robert Runcie (Trinity Hall), 1980–1991
- Rowan Williams (Christ's/Clare), 2002–2012
- Justin Welby (Trinity), 2013–2025

== The arts ==
=== Literature ===
==== Fiction writers ====
===== A–G =====
- Peter Ackroyd (Clare)
- Douglas Adams (St John's)
- Sir Kingsley Amis (Peterhouse), Booker Prize winner
- Mulk Raj Anand (unknown)
- Kwame Anthony Appiah (Clare)
- Martin Armstrong (Pembroke)
- John Bale (Jesus)
- J. G. Ballard (King's)
- Catherine Banner (Fitzwilliam)
- David Benedictus (Churchill)
- Gregory Benford (Jesus)
- Sir Walter Besant (Christ's)
- E. R. Braithwaite (Caius)
- Howard Brenton (St Catharine's)
- Anita Brookner (Murray Edwards), Booker Prize winner
- F. C. Burnand (Trinity)
- Samuel Butler (St John's)
- Jez Butterworth (St John's)
- A. S. Byatt (Newnham), Booker Prize winner
- John Byrom (Trinity)
- Robert Chartham (unknown)
- Erskine Childers (Trinity)
- Charles Churchill (St John's)
- Jonathan Coe (Trinity)
- William Cooper (Christ's)
- Michael Crichton (unknown)
- Martin Crimp (St Catharine's)
- Richard Cumberland (Trinity)
- Tsitsi Dangarembga (Sidney Sussex)
- Seamus Deane (Pembroke)
- Warwick Deeping (Trinity)
- Anita Desai (Girton)
- Colin Dexter (Christ's)
- Terrance Dicks (Downing)
- Emma Donoghue (Girton)
- Dame Margaret Drabble (Newnham)
- Patricia Duncker (Newnham)
- Sebastian Faulks (Emmanuel)
- Julian Fellowes (Magdalene)
- Ronald Firbank (Trinity Hall)
- Tibor Fischer (Peterhouse)
- John Fletcher (Corpus Christi)
- Giles Foden (Fitzwilliam/St John's)
- E. M. Forster (King's)
- Michael Frayn (Emmanuel)
- William Gerhardie (unknown)
- David Gibbins (Corpus Christi)
- Simon Gray (Trinity)
- Robert Greene (St John's)
- Susanna Gregory (Wolfson)

===== H–M =====
- Lee Hall (Fitzwilliam)
- Sir David Hare (Jesus)
- Joanne Harris (St Catharine's)
- Robert Harris (Selwyn)
- Philip Hensher (Jesus)
- G. A. Henty (Caius)
- Wendy Holden (Girton)
- Nick Hornby (Jesus)
- Christopher Isherwood (Corpus Christi)
- Howard Jacobson (Downing/Selwyn), Booker Prize winner
- M. R. James (King's)
- Elizabeth Jenkins (Newnham)
- Peter Jukes (Queens')
- Charles Kingsley (Magdalene)
- Nathaniel Lee (Trinity)
- Rosamond Lehmann (Girton)
- C. S. Lewis (Magdalene)
- Malcolm Lowry (St Catharine's)
- Gavin Lyall (Pembroke)
- Richard Maher (Queens')
- Christopher Marlowe (Corpus Christi)
- Hisham Matar (Girton)
- A. D. Miller (unknown)
- A. A. Milne (Trinity)
- Nicholas Monsarrat (Trinity)
- Richard K. Morgan (Queens')
- Dame Iris Murdoch (Newnham), Booker Prize winner
- Leo Myers (Trinity)

===== N–Z =====
- Vladimir Nabokov (Trinity)
- Thomas Norton (unknown)
- Brian O'Doherty (unknown)
- Maggie O'Farrell (Emmanuel)
- Joseph O'Neill (Girton)
- Lawrence Osborne (Fitzwilliam)
- Helen Oyeyemi (Corpus Christi)
- Tim Parks (Downing)
- Philippa Pearce (Girton)
- Sir Max Pemberton (Caius)
- Samuel Pepys (Magdalene)
- Marie Phillips (Robinson)
- Stephen Poliakoff (King's)
- John Cowper Powys (Corpus Christi)
- J. B. Priestley (Trinity Hall)
- Frederic Raphael (St John's), Academy Award winner
- Julian Rathbone (Magdalene)
- Simon Raven (King's)
- Piers Paul Read (St John's)
- Amber Reeves (Newnham)
- Forrest Reid (Christ's)
- Sir Salman Rushdie (King's), Booker Prize winner
- Edward Rutherfurd (Caius)
- Thomas Shadwell (Caius)
- Anthony Shaffer (Trinity)
- Sir Peter Shaffer (Trinity), Academy Award winner
- Tom Sharpe (Pembroke)
- James Shirley (St Catharine's)
- Indra Sinha (Pembroke)
- Ali Smith (Newnham)
- Zadie Smith (King's)
- C. P. Snow (Christ's)
- Wole Soyinka (Churchill), Nobel Prize winner
- George Steiner (Churchill)
- Laurence Sterne (Jesus)
- Nick Stone (unknown)
- William Sutcliffe (Emmanuel)
- Graham Swift (Queens'), Booker Prize winner
- Netta Syrett (Hughes Hall)
- Tom Taylor (Trinity)
- William Makepeace Thackeray (Trinity)
- Marcel Theroux (Clare)
- Matt Thorne (Sidney Sussex)
- Frank Tuohy (King's)
- Alison Uttley (Hughes Hall)
- Leslie Valiant (king's), Turing Award winner
- Mario Vargas Llosa (Churchill), Nobel Prize winner
- Sir Hugh Walpole (Emmanuel)
- Eudora Welty (Peterhouse), Pulitzer Prize winner
- Patrick White (King's), Nobel Prize winner
- T. H. White (Queens')
- James H. Wilkinson (St. John's), Turing Award winner
- Raymond Williams (Trinity)
- James Wood (Jesus)
- Jin Yong (St John's)

==== Non-fiction writers ====
===== A–Z =====
- Joseph Pearson (Trinity Hall)
- Merlin Sheldrake (Clare College)

==== Poets ====
===== A–M =====
- William Alabaster (Trinity)
- Sri Aurobindo (King's)
- Harivanshrai Bachchan (St Catharine's)
- John Bale (Jesus)
- Maurice Baring (Trinity)
- A. C. Benson (King's/Magdalene)
- John Berryman (Clare)
- Joseph Brodsky (Clare Hall), Nobel Prize winner
- Rupert Brooke (King's)
- John Byrom (Trinity)
- Lord Byron (Trinity)
- Samuel Taylor Coleridge (Jesus)
- F. M. Cornford (Trinity)
- John Cornford (Trinity)
- Abraham Cowley (Trinity)
- George Crabbe (Trinity)
- Cecil Day-Lewis (unknown), Poet Laureate
- John Donne (unknown)
- Charles Montagu Doughty (Caius)
- John Dryden (Trinity), Poet Laureate
- Richard Eberhart (St John's)
- D. J. Enright (Downing)
- Laurence Eusden (Trinity), Poet Laureate
- Michael Field (Newnham)
- Edward FitzGerald (Trinity)
- Giles Fletcher (Trinity)
- George Gascoigne (Trinity)
- Alice Goodman (Trinity)
- Sir Edmund Gosse (Trinity)
- Thomas Gray (Peterhouse/Pembroke)
- Thom Gunn (Trinity)
- Arthur Hallam (Trinity)
- Peter Hausted (Queens')
- Hamish Henderson (Downing)
- George Herbert (Trinity)
- Robert Herrick (St John's)
- Geoffrey Hill (Emmanuel)
- Philip Hobsbaum (Downing)
- David Holbrook (Downing)
- John Holloway (Queens')
- A. E. Housman (Trinity)
- Ted Hughes (Pembroke), Poet Laureate
- Sir Muhammad Iqbal (Trinity)
- Lawrence Joseph (Magdalene)
- Arthur Henry King (unknown)
- John Lehmann (Trinity)
- Malcolm Lowry (St Catharine's)
- Christopher Marlowe (Corpus Christi)
- Andrew Marvell (Trinity)
- Thomas May (Sidney Sussex)
- John Milton (Christ's)
- Wendy Mulford (unknown)
- Frederic William Henry Myers (Trinity)

===== N–Z =====
- Victor Benjamin Neuburg (Trinity)
- Sylvia Plath (Newnham), Pulitzer Prize winner
- J. H. Prynne (Caius)
- Kathleen Raine (Girton)
- Thomas Randolph (Trinity)
- Tom Raworth (King's)
- Peter Redgrove (Queens')
- Siegfried Sassoon (Clare)
- Thomas Shadwell (Caius), Poet Laureate
- John Skelton (unknown), Poet Laureate
- Christopher Smart (Pembroke)
- Edmund Spenser (Pembroke), Poet Laureate
- Sir John Suckling (Trinity)
- Alfred, Lord Tennyson (Trinity), Poet Laureate
- Derick Thomson (unknown)
- William Wentworth (Peterhouse)
- William Whitehead (Clare), Poet Laureate
- John Wilkinson (Jesus)
- William Wordsworth (St John's), Poet Laureate
- Xu Zhimo (King's)

==== Literary scholars ====
- M. H. Abrams (Magdalene)
- Peter Ackroyd (Clare)
- Noel Annan (King's)
- Jonathan Bate (St. Catharine's/Trinity Hall)
- Mary Beard (Newnham)
- Clive Bell (Trinity)
- Joan Bennett (Girton)
- Stanley Bennett (Emmanuel)
- Richard Bentley (St John's/Trinity)
- Harold Bloom (Pembroke)
- Alain de Botton (Caius)
- Henry Bradshaw (King's)
- Edward G. Browne (Pembroke)
- H. M. Chadwick (Clare)
- Nick Clarke (Fitzwilliam)
- A. B. Cook (Queens'/Trinity)
- F. M. Cornford (Trinity)
- Jonathan Culler (Selwyn)
- Donald Davie (St Catharine's/Caius)
- Simon Digby (Trinity)
- Patrick Dixon (King's)
- Denis Donoghue (King's)
- Gerald Duckworth (Clare)
- Terry Eagleton (Trinity/Jesus)
- Sir William Empson (Magdalene)
- Charles le Gai Eaton (King's)
- Henry Louis Gates Jr. (Clare)
- Robert Gittings (Jesus)
- Sir Edmund Gosse (Trinity)
- Simon Gray (Trinity)
- Stephen Greenblatt (Pembroke)
- Sir Walter Wilson Greg (Trinity)
- Leslie Halliwell (St Catharine's)
- Jane Ellen Harrison (Newnham)
- Samuel Hartlib (unknown)
- Hugh Haughton (Emmanuel)
- John Hersey (Clare), Pulitzer Prize winner
- Theo Hobson (Hughes Hall)
- Vyvyan Holland (Trinity Hall)
- Graham Hough (Queens'/Christ's/Darwin)
- Christopher Isherwood (Corpus Christi)
- Peter Jukes (Queens')
- Sir Frank Kermode (King's)
- L. C. Knights (Selwyn/Christ's)
- F. R. Leavis (Emmanuel/Downing)
- Q. D. Leavis (Girton)
- F. L. Lucas (King's)
- Colin MacCabe (King's)
- Sir Desmond MacCarthy (Trinity)
- Ronald Brunlees McKerrow (Trinity)
- Marshall McLuhan (Trinity Hall)
- Thomas Merton (Clare)
- Karl Miller (Downing)
- John Mullan (King's/Jesus/Fitzwilliam)
- Abioseh Nicol (Christ's)
- C. K. Ogden (Magdalene)
- Richard Poirier (Downing)
- Leonard Potts (Trinity/Queens')
- Sir Arthur Quiller-Couch (Jesus)
- Simon Raven (King's)
- Forrest Reid (Christ's)
- I. A. Richards (Magdalene)
- Jo Riley (unknown)
- Susan Sellers (Trinity/Lucy Cavendish)
- Walter William Skeat (Christ's)
- J. B. Steane (Jesus)
- George Steiner (Churchill)
- Sir Leslie Stephen (Trinity Hall)
- Lytton Strachey (Trinity)
- Tony Tanner (Jesus/King's)
- Claire Tomalin (Newnham)
- R. C. Trevelyan (Trinity)
- Brian Vickers (Trinity/Downing)
- Arthur Waley (King's)
- Raymond Williams (Trinity)
- J. Dover Wilson (Caius)
- James Wood (Jesus)
- Leonard Woolf (Trinity)

==== Travel writers ====
- Maurice Baring (Trinity)
- Claudius Buchanan (Queens')
- Robert Chartham (unknown)
- William Dalrymple (Trinity)
- Maurizio Giuliano (Fitzwilliam)
- Joanna Kavenna (St John's)
- Alexander William Kinglake (Trinity)
- Robert Macfarlane (Pembroke/Emmanuel)
- Fynes Moryson (Peterhouse)
- Matthew Parris (Clare)
- Gerald Sparrow
- Terry Waite (Trinity Hall)
- Ted Walker (St John's)
- Samantha Weinberg (Trinity)

=== Actors, comedians, directors, producers and screenwriters ===
==== A–G ====
- Khalid Abdalla (Queens')
- Clive Anderson (Selwyn)
- Michael Apted (Downing), Grammy Award winner
- David Armand (St Catharine's)
- Alexander Armstrong (Trinity), BAFTA joint winner
- Richard Attenborough, Baron Attenborough (Emmanuel), Academy Award winner
- Richard Ayoade (St Catharine's)
- James Bachman (Emmanuel)
- David Baddiel (King's)
- Jamie Bamber (St John's)
- Christopher Barry (unknown)
- Tom Basden (Pembroke)
- Robert Bathurst (Pembroke)
- Sir Simon Russell Beale (Caius)
- Rodney Bennett (St John's)
- John Bird (King's)
- Simon Bird (Queens'), BAFTA winner
- James Bloor (unknown)
- Hugh Bonneville (Corpus Christi)
- Eleanor Bron (Newnham)
- Tim Brooke-Taylor (Pembroke)
- Tony Buffery (Corpus Christi)
- Jimmy Carr (Caius)
- Graham Chapman (Emmanuel)
- John Cleese (Downing), Emmy Award winner
- Sacha Baron Cohen (Christ's)
- Horace de Vere Cole (Trinity)
- Lily Cole (King's)
- Peter Cook (Pembroke), Grammy Award winner
- Christian Coulson (Clare)
- James Dacre (Jesus)
- Trevor Dann (Fitzwilliam)
- Hugh Dennis (St John's)
- Diana Devlin (Newnham)
- Declan Donnellan (Queens')
- Robin Ellis (Fitzwilliam)
- Mark Evans (unknown)
- Sir Richard Eyre (Peterhouse)
- Julian Fellowes (Magdalene), Academy Award winner
- Jason Forbes (Jesus)
- Trent Ford (Clare)
- John Fortune (King's)
- Stephen Frears (Trinity)
- Robin French (Selwyn)
- Stephen Fry (Queens')
- Graeme Garden (Emmanuel)
- Genevieve Gaunt (Newnham)
- Mel Giedroyc (Trinity)
- Stefan Golaszewski (unknown)
- Paul Greengrass (Queens')

==== H–M ====
- Sir Peter Hall (St Catharine's)
- Rebecca Hall (St Catharine's)
- Andy Hamilton (Downing)
- Phil Hammond (Girton)
- Nick Hancock (Homerton)
- Terrence Hardiman (Fitzwilliam)
- Gerald Harper (unknown)
- Naomie Harris (Pembroke)
- Tony Hendra (St. John's)
- Tom Hiddleston (Pembroke), Golden Globe Award winner
- Freddie Highmore (Emmanuel)
- Philip Hinchcliffe (Pembroke)
- Tom Hollander (Selwyn)
- The Hollow Men (St Catharine's/Selwyn/Emmanuel)
- Matthew Holness (Trinity Hall)
- John Hopkins (St Catharine's)
- Alex Horne (Sidney Sussex)
- Waris Hussein (Queens')
- Peter Matthew Hutton (Selwyn)
- Sir Nicholas Hytner (Trinity Hall)
- Eric Idle (Pembroke)
- Sir Derek Jacobi (St John's), Emmy Award winner
- Sir Antony Jay (Magdalene)
- Humphrey Jennings (Pembroke)
- Griff Rhys Jones (Emmanuel)
- Ellie Kendrick (Jesus)
- Duncan Kenworthy (Christ's)
- Paul King (St Catharine's)
- Matt Kirshen (Clare)
- Hugh Laurie (Selwyn), Golden Globe Award winner
- John Lloyd (Trinity)
- Alice Lowe (King's)
- Jonathan Lynn (Pembroke)
- Graeme MacDonald (Jesus)
- John Madden (Sidney Sussex)
- Stephen Mangan (Caius)
- Wolf Mankowitz (Downing)
- Miriam Margolyes (Newnham)
- James Mason (Peterhouse)
- Sir Ian McKellen (St Catharine's)
- Sir Sam Mendes (Peterhouse), Academy Award winner
- Roger Michell (Queens')
- Bernard Miles, Baron Miles (Pembroke)
- Miles Millar (Christ's)
- Ben Miller (St Catharine's), BAFTA joint winner
- Sir Jonathan Miller (St John's)
- David Mitchell (Peterhouse), BAFTA joint winner
- Nick Mohammed (Magdalene)
- Lucy Montgomery (unknown)
- Hattie Morahan (New Hall)
- Neil Mullarkey (Robinson)
- Richard Murdoch (Pembroke)
- Hannah Murray (Queens')

==== N–Z ====
- Henry Naylor (Downing)
- Mike Newell (Magdalene)
- Robert Newman (Selwyn)
- Thandie Newton (Downing)
- James Norton (Fitzwilliam)
- Sir Trevor Nunn (Downing)
- Bill Oddie (Pembroke)
- John Oliver (Christ's), Emmy Award winner
- Barunka O'Shaughnessy (unknown)
- Richard Osman (Trinity)
- Tony Palmer (Trinity Hall), Emmy Award winner
- Andy Parsons (Christ's)
- Alice Patten (Queens')
- John Percival (Sidney Sussex)
- Sue Perkins (New Hall)
- Steve Punt (St Catharine's)
- Frederic Raphael (St John's), Academy Award winner
- Jan Ravens (Homerton), first female president of Footlights
- Corin Redgrave (King's)
- Sir Michael Redgrave (Magdalene)
- Eddie Redmayne (Trinity), Academy Award winner
- Karel Reisz (Emmanuel)
- Blake Ritson (unknown)
- Matthew Robinson (King's)
- Antony Root (Christ's)
- Will Sharpe (unknown)
- Nicola Shindler (Caius)
- John Shrapnel (St Catharine's)
- Don Siegel (Jesus), Academy Award winner
- Tony Slattery (Trinity Hall)
- Iain Softley (Queens')
- Dan Stevens (Emmanuel)
- Tim Sullivan (Fitzwilliam)
- Jonny Sweet (Pembroke)
- Clive Swift (Caius)
- David Swift (Caius)
- Tilda Swinton (New Hall), Academy Award winner
- Fagun Thakrar (Pembroke)
- Joe Thomas (Pembroke)
- Emma Thompson (Newnham), Academy Award winner
- Sandi Toksvig (Girton)
- Richard Vranch (unknown)
- Nicola Walker (New Hall)
- Holly Walsh (Caius)
- Phil Wang (King's)
- Rick Warden (Churchill)
- Mark Watson (Queens')
- Robert Webb (Robinson), BAFTA joint winner
- Rachel Weisz (Trinity Hall), Academy Award winner
- Chris Weitz (Trinity)
- Olivia Williams (Newnham)
- Michael Winner (Downing)
- Andrea Wonfor (New Hall)
- Peter Woodthorpe (Magdalene)
- Lloyd Woolf (unknown)
- Basil Wright (Corpus Christi)
- Terence Young (St Catharine's)

=== Architects ===
- Christopher Alexander (Trinity)
- Sir Arthur Blomfield (Trinity)
- Peter Boston (King's)
- W. D. Caroe (Trinity)
- Sir Hugh Casson (St John's)
- Basil Champneys (Trinity)
- Edward Cullinan (unknown)
- Biba Dow (unknown)
- Peter Eisenman (Trinity)
- Ralph Erskine (Clare Hall)
- James Essex (King's)
- Spencer de Grey (Churchill)
- Lord Thomas de Grey (St John's)
- Judith Ledeboer (Newnham)
- Sir Leslie Martin (Jesus)
- Rod I. McAllister (Girton)
- Graham Morrison (Jesus)
- Frank Newby (Trinity)
- Christopher Nicholson (St John's)
- Jadwiga Piłsudska (Newnham)
- Cedric Price (St John's)
- Edward Schroeder Prior (Caius)
- Sir Charles Herbert Reilly (Queens')
- Ian Ritchie (unknown)
- Deborah Saunt (unknown)
- Harold Tomlinson (unknown)
- William Wilkins (Caius)
- Sir Clough Williams-Ellis (Trinity)
- Sir Colin St John Wilson (Corpus Christi/Churchill)
- Sir Matthew Digby Wyatt (unknown)
- Ken Yeang (Wolfson)

=== Artists ===
- Antony Armstrong-Jones, 1st Earl of Snowdon (Jesus), portrait photographer and Emmy Award winner
- Sir Cecil Beaton (St John's), fashion and portrait photographer, diarist, style icon, interior designer and Academy Award-winning stage and costume designer
- Quentin Blake (Downing), cartoonist, illustrator and children's author, known for his collaborations with writer Roald Dahl
- Sir Roy Yorke Calne (unknown), contemporary painter and Group 90 member
- Sir Anthony Caro (Christ's), abstract sculptor, famed for the use of 'found' industrial objects
- Ralph Chubb (Selwyn), late Romantic painter and printer
- Roger Fry (King's), modernist painter and Bloomsbury Group member
- Antony Gormley (Trinity), sculptor, best known for the Angel of the North
- Jon Harris (Trinity Hall), painter, illustrator, and calligrapher, best known for his drawings of Cambridge
- Wuon-Gean Ho (unknown), contemporary artist and printmaker
- Benjamin Hope (unknown), painter, noted for plein air oil paintings of London
- Luke Piper (unknown), contemporary landscape painter
- Marc Quinn (Robinson), contemporary sculptor, member of Young British Artists, best known for sculptures Self, Alison Lapper Pregnant and Siren
- Mick Rock (Caius), pop culture photographer, renowned for iconic images of major rock bands
- Julian Trevelyan (Trinity), surrealist painter and modern printmaker

=== Art critics, museum directors, and historians of art ===
- Clive Bell (Trinity), Formalist art critic, Bloomsbury Group member
- Anita Brookner (Murray Edwards), art historian, reader at the Courtauld Institute of Art and first female Slade Professor of Fine Art
- Sir Sydney Cockerell (unknown), director of the Fitzwilliam Museum and close friend of John Ruskin
- William George Constable (St John's), curator of the Boston Museum of Fine Art and assistant director of the National Gallery
- Shalini Ganendra (Trinity Hall), fine arts consultant and gallerist, judge on various art award panels
- Michael Jaffé (King's), art historian, director of the Fitzwilliam Museum and proprietor of Clifton Maybank House
- Michael Kitson (King's), art historian, Claude Lorrain expert, professor at the Slade School of Fine Art and the Courtauld Institute of Art
- Joseph Koerner (unknown), art historian, German art expert, professor of History of Art and Architecture at Harvard and lecturer at the Courtauld Institute of Art
- Lothar Ledderose (unknown), professor of the History of Art of Eastern Asia at the University of Heidelberg, Mellon Lecturer at the National Gallery of Art
- Timothy Potts (Clare), director of the Kimbell Art Museum, National Gallery of Victoria and Fitzwilliam Museum
- Duncan Robinson (Clare/Magdalene), director of the Fitzwilliam Museum and chairman of the Henry Moore Foundation
- Simon Schama (Christ's), art historian and critic, professor at Columbia University, author and documentary director
- Sir Nicholas Serota (Christ's), director of the Whitechapel Gallery and The Museum of Modern Art, Oxford, chairman of the Turner Prize jury
- Sir Charles Waldstein (King's), director of the American School of Classical Studies, Archaeological Institute of America and Fitzwilliam Museum
- Horace Walpole, 4th Earl of Orford (King's), art historian and proprietor of Strawberry Hill
- Sir Matthew Digby Wyatt (unknown), art historian, secretary of the Great Exhibition and the first Slade Professor of Fine Art

=== Musicians ===
==== A–G ====
- Thomas Adès (King's)
- Julian Anderson (King's)
- Malcolm Archer (Jesus)
- Sir Richard Armstrong (Corpus Christi)
- David Atherton (Fitzwilliam/Trinity)
- Pete Atkin (St John's)
- Martin Baker (Downing)
- Stephen Barlow (Trinity)
- George Benjamin (King's)
- Sir William Sterndale Bennett (King's)
- Sir Arthur Bliss (Pembroke)
- Leslie Bricusse (Caius), Academy and Grammy Award winner
- William Denis Browne (Clare)
- Humphrey Burton (Fitzwilliam), Emmy Award winner
- Clemency Burton-Hill (Magdalene)
- John Butt (King's)
- Andrew Carwood (St John's)
- Stephen Cleobury (St John's)
- Nicholas Cook (Darwin)
- Arnold Cooke (Caius)
- Benjamin Cooke (unknown)
- Harold Darke (King's)
- Thurston Dart (unknown)
- Sir Andrew Davis (King's)
- Sir Colin Davis (unknown), Grammy Award winner
- John Deathridge (King's)
- Herbert De Pinna
- E. J. Dent (King's)
- Delia Derbyshire (Girton)
- Nick Drake (Fitzwilliam)
- Richard Egarr (Clare)
- Sir Mark Elder (Corpus Christi)
- Robert Fayrfax (King's)
- Simon H. Fell (Fitzwilliam)
- Matthew Fisher (Wolfson)
- Fred Frith (Christ's)
- Andrew Gant (St John's)
- Sir John Eliot Gardiner (King's), Grammy Award winner
- Noel Gay (Christ's)
- Orlando Gibbons (King's)
- Armstrong Gibbs (Trinity)
- James Gilchrist (King's)
- Charlie Gillett (Peterhouse)
- Sir William Glock (Caius)
- Alexander Goehr (Trinity Hall)
- Rachel Gough (King's)
- Alan Gray (Trinity)
- John Greaves (Pembroke)
- Maurice Greene (unknown)
- Colin Greenwood (Peterhouse), Grammy Award winner
- Douglas Guest (King's)
- George Guest (St John's)

==== H–M ====
- Patrick Hadley (Pembroke)
- Charles Hart (Robinson)
- Jonathan Harvey (St John's)
- Kit Hesketh-Harvey (Clare)
- Richard Hickox (Queens'), Grammy Award winner
- Tim Hodgkinson (unknown)
- Christopher Hogwood (Pembroke)
- Robin Holloway (King's/Caius)
- Herbert Howells (St John's)
- Eric Idle (Pembroke), Grammy Award winner
- Brian Kay (King's), Grammy Award winner
- Simon Keenlyside (St John's)
- Jonathon King (Trinity)
- Robert King (St John's)
- Robert Kirby (Caius)
- Markus Kuhn (Wolfson)
- Stephen Layton (King's/Trinity)
- Sir Philip Ledger (King's)
- Walter Leigh (Christ's)
- Raymond Leppard (Trinity)
- Sir George Alexander Macfarren (unknown)
- Joanna MacGregor (New Hall)
- Andrew Manze (Clare)
- Richard Marlow (Selwyn/Trinity)
- Andrew Marriner (King's)
- Rory McEwen (Trinity)
- Hubert Stanley Middleton (Peterhouse/Trinity)
- Silvina Milstein (Jesus/King's)
- David Munrow (Pembroke), Grammy Award winner

==== N–Z ====
- Henry Cotter Nixon (unknown)
- John Noble (Fitzwilliam)
- Ben Nobuto (Pembroke)
- Sir Roger Norrington (Clare), Grammy Award winner
- Boris Ord (Corpus Christi/King's)
- Tarik O'Regan (Corpus Christi/Trinity)
- Robin Orr (Pembroke)
- Martin Outram (Fitzwilliam)
- Christopher Page (Sidney Sussex)
- Christopher Palmer (Trinity)
- Roger Parker (St John's)
- David Parry (unknown)
- Geoffrey Paterson (St John's)
- Ernst Pauer (unknown)
- John Potter (King's/Caius)
- Andrew Powell (King's)
- Clement Power (Caius)
- Simon Preston (King's)
- Robert Ramsey (Trinity)
- William Henry Reed (unknown)
- Kimberley Rew (Jesus)
- Alan Ridout (unknown)
- Cyril Rootham (St John's)
- John Rutter (Clare)
- Saman Samadi (Wolfson)
- Rina Sawayama (Magdalene)
- Matthew Schellhorn (Girton)
- John Scott (St John's)
- Cecil Sharp (Clare)
- Geoffrey Shaw (Caius)
- David Skinner (Sidney Sussex)
- Sir Arthur Somervell (King's)
- Tim Souster (King's)
- Roger Smalley (King's)
- John Spiers (King's)
- Nicholas Staggins (unknown)
- Simon Standage (King's)
- Sir Charles Villiers Stanford (Queens'/Trinity)
- Bernard Stevens (unknown)
- Richard Stilgoe (Clare)
- Mark Stone (King's)
- Jeffrey Tate (Christ's), conductor
- Art Themen (unknown)
- Christopher Tye
- Roger Vignoles (Magdalene)
- Thomas Attwood Walmisley (Trinity/St John's/Jesus)
- Jeremy Warmsley (Churchill)
- Judith Weir (King's)
- Eric Whitacre (Sidney Sussex)
- John Clarke Whitfield (Trinity/St John's)
- Sir David Willcocks (King's), Grammy Award winner
- Jonathan Willcocks (Trinity)
- Ralph Vaughan Williams (Trinity)
- Sir Steuart Wilson (King's)
- Tony Wilson (Jesus)
- Charles Wood (Selwyn/Caius)
- Maury Yeston (Clare), Tony Award winner

==== Groups ====
- Alamire (Sidney Sussex)
- Cambridge Buskers (unknown)
- Cambridge Singers (Clare)
- Cantabile (various)
- The Cardinall's Musick (various)
- Clean Bandit (Jesus), Grammy Award winners
- Endellion Quartet (various)
- The Fitzwilliam Quartet (Fitzwilliam), Grammy Award winners
- Henry Cow (various)
- Hot Chip (Sidney Sussex/Jesus)
- Katrina and the Waves (Jesus), Eurovision Song Contest winners
- The King's Consort (St John's)
- The King's Singers (King's), Grammy Award winners
- Monteverdi Choir (King's)
- Retrospect Ensemble (St John's)
- The Soft Boys (various)
- Spiers and Boden (King's)
- Sports Team (unknown)
- Stile Antico (Trinity), Grammy Award winners
- Trinity Baroque (Trinity)

== Academic disciplines ==
=== Scientists, technologists, and mathematicians ===
==== A–C ====
- Rediet Abebe (Pembroke), mathematician and computer scientist
- Samson Abramsky (King's), computer scientist
- Gilbert Smithson Adair (King's), protein scientist
- John Couch Adams (St John's), mathematician and astronomer
- Edgar Adrian, 1st Baron Adrian (Trinity), Nobel Prize winner, physiologist
- Wilfred Eade Agar (King's), animal scientist
- Sir George Airy (Trinity)
- Pat Ambler (Newnham), roboticist
- Philip Warren Anderson (Churchill/Jesus), Nobel Prize winner, physicist
- Ross J. Anderson (Trinity), computer scientist
- Sir Edward Appleton (St John's), Nobel Prize winner, physicist
- Francis Aston (Trinity), Nobel Prize winner, physicist
- Sir Michael Atiyah (Trinity), Fields Medal and Abel Prize winner
- Charles Babbage (Peterhouse), mathematician
- Alan Baker (Trinity), Fields Medal winner, mathematician
- H. F. Baker (St. John's)
- Charles Barkla (Trinity/King's), Nobel Prize winner, physicist
- Horace Barlow (Trinity)
- Simon Baron-Cohen (Trinity), psychologist
- Isaac Barrow (Trinity)
- John Barrow (Clare), Templeton Prize winner, mathematician
- Tristan Bekinschtein, neuroscientist
- Tony Bell (Churchill), physicist
- Noel Benson (unknown), geologist
- John Desmond Bernal (Emmanuel)
- Elizabeth Blackburn (Darwin), Nobel Prize winner
- Patrick Blackett (Magdalene/King's), Nobel Prize winner, physicist
- Sarah Bohndiek (Corpus Christi), physicist
- Niels Bohr (Trinity), Nobel Prize winner, physicist
- Béla Bollobás (Trinity)
- Enrico Bombieri (Trinity), Fields Medal winner, mathematician
- Sir Hermann Bondi (Trinity), Mathematician and cosmologist
- Richard Borcherds (Trinity), Fields Medal winner, mathematician
- Max Born (Caius), Nobel Prize winner
- Sir Jagdish Chandra Bose (Christ's)
- Sir Lawrence Bragg (Trinity), Nobel Prize winner
- Sir William Henry Bragg (Trinity), Nobel Prize winner
- Sydney Brenner (King's), Nobel Prize winner
- Alec Broers (Caius)
- Jacob Bronowski (Jesus)
- Tony Buffery (Corpus Christi)
- Michael Burrows (Churchill), inventor of the first internet search machine, Alta Vista
- Samantha Butler (Emmanuel)
- Sir Roy Yorke Calne (Trinity Hall)
- Roger Carpenter (Caius)
- James McKeen Cattell, psychologist
- Henry Cavendish (Peterhouse)
- Arthur Cayley (Trinity)
- Sir James Chadwick (Caius), Nobel Prize winner
- Ernst Chain (Fitzwilliam), Nobel Prize winner
- Subrahmanyan Chandrasekhar (Trinity), Nobel Prize winner
- John Coates (Emmanuel)
- Sir John Cockcroft (St John's), Nobel Prize winner
- Sir Christopher Cockerell (Peterhouse)
- Joseph Comerford (Fitzwilliam)
- Arthur Holly Compton (unknown), Nobel Prize winner
- John Horton Conway (Caius)
- David Cordier (unknown)
- Allan Cormack (St John's), Nobel Prize winner
- Sir Alan Cottrell (Christ's/Jesus), chief scientific adviser
- Francis Crick (Caius/Churchill), Nobel Prize winner
- David Crighton (St. John's)

==== D–G ====
- Henry Dale (Trinity), Nobel Prize winner
- Charles Darwin (Christ's), naturalist
- Sir Charles Galton Darwin (Trinity/Christ's)
- Erasmus Darwin (St John's)
- Sir Francis Sacheverel Darwin (Emmanuel)
- Sir George Darwin (Trinity)
- Harold Davenport (Trinity)
- Ashika David (Trinity)
- Aubrey de Grey (Trinity Hall)
- Augustus De Morgan (Trinity)
- John Dee (St John's/Trinity)
- Beryl Dent (Newnham), English mathematical physicist
- Duncan R. Derry (unknown), Logan Medal winner, economic geologist
- Sir James Dewar (Peterhouse)
- Jared Diamond (Trinity), Pulitzer Prize winner
- Paul Dirac (St John's), Nobel Prize winner
- Simon Donaldson (Pembroke), Fields Medal winner
- Freeman Dyson (Trinity), Templeton Prize winner
- Sir Arthur Eddington (Trinity)
- Robert Edwards (Churchill), Nobel Prize winner
- Sam Edwards (Caius)
- Sir Martin Evans (Christ's), biochemist, Nobel Prize winner
- Thomas Campbell Eyton (St John's), naturalist
- Alan Fersht (Caius)
- Ronald Fisher (Caius)
- John Flamsteed (Jesus)
- Howard Florey (Caius), Nobel Prize winner
- Dian Fossey (Darwin)
- Sir Michael Foster (Trinity)
- Sir Ralph Fowler (Trinity)
- William Fowler (Pembroke), Nobel Prize winner
- Rosalind Franklin (Newnham)
- Sir Richard Friend (Trinity/St John's)
- Sir Francis Galton (Trinity)
- Mike Gascoyne (Churchill), chief technical officer of the Caterham F1 Formula One team
- Gary Gibbons (Trinity)
- Walter Gilbert (Trinity), Nobel Prize winner
- William Gilbert (St John's)
- Sir Harold Gillies (Caius)
- Peter Goddard (St. John's)
- Thomas Gold (Trinity)
- Jane Goodall (Newnham/Darwin)
- Timothy Gowers (Trinity), Fields Medal winner
- George Green (Caius)
- Michael Green (Churchill/Clare Hall)
- Paul Greengard (unknown), Nobel Prize winner
- Siân Griffiths (New Hall)
- Richard Kenneth Guy (Caius), British mathematician

==== H–M ====
- J. B. S. Haldane (Trinity)
- Nicholas Harberd (Christ's), Fellow of the Royal Society
- Gaylord Harnwell (unknown)
- G. H. Hardy (Trinity), discovered Srinivasa Ramanujan
- Douglas Hartree (St. John's)
- H. W. Harvey (Downing), marine biologist
- William Harvey (Caius)
- Stephen Hawking (Trinity Hall/Caius)
- Roger Heath-Brown (Trinity)
- William Heberden (St John's)
- Richard Henderson (Corpus Christi/Darwin), Nobel Prize winner
- Richard Henson, neuroscientist
- Sir John Herschel (St John's)
- Antony Hewish (Caius/Churchill), Nobel Prize winner
- A. V. Hill (Trinity), Nobel Prize winner
- Dorothy Hill (Newnham)
- Christopher Hinton (Trinity), Turing Award winner
- WVD Hodge (Pembroke)
- Alan Hodgkin (Trinity), Nobel Prize winner
- Dorothy Hodgkin (Newnham/Girton), Nobel Prize winner
- Sir Frederick Hopkins (Trinity/Emmanuel), Nobel Prize winner
- Sir Fred Hoyle (Emmanuel)
- Ieuan Hughes, emeritus professor of paediatrics
- Sir Tim Hunt (Clare), Nobel Prize winner
- Sir Andrew Huxley (Trinity), Nobel Prize winner
- Edward A. Irving (unknown), Logan Medal winner
- James Jeans (Trinity)
- Karen Spärck Jones (Girton)
- Brian Josephson (Trinity), Nobel Prize winner
- Georgette D. Kanmogne, geneticist and molecular virologist
- Pyotr Kapitsa (Trinity), Nobel Prize winner
- Kay-Tee Khaw (Girton/Caius), professor of Clinical Gerontology
- Stan Kelly-Bootle (Downing)
- Sir John Kendrew (Trinity), Nobel Prize winner
- Sir Geoffrey Keynes (Pembroke)
- Douwe Kiela (Darwin)
- Sir David King (Downing), chief scientific adviser
- Sir Aaron Klug (Trinity/Peterhouse), Nobel Prize winner
- Georges J.F. Kohler (unknown), Nobel Prize winner
- Sir Hans Krebs (Girton), Nobel Prize winner
- Horace Lamb (Trinity)
- Joseph Larmor (St. John's)
- David Lary (Churchill)
- Tina Lasisi (unknown), biological anthropologist
- Imre Leader (Trinity)
- Louis Leakey (St John's)
- Georges Lemaître (St Edmund's)
- John Lennard-Jones (Trinity)
- Geraint F. Lewis (unknown), astrophysicist
- Jack Lewis, Baron Lewis of Newnham (Robinson)
- James Lighthill (Trinity)
- John Edensor Littlewood (Trinity)
- Peter Littlewood (Trinity)
- Alan MacDiarmid (Sidney Sussex), Nobel Prize winner
- Sir David MacKay (Trinity/Darwin), chief scientific adviser to DECC
- Thomas Henry Manning (unknown)
- Elizabeth Nesta Marks (Newnham)
- Archer Martin (Peterhouse), Nobel Prize winner
- Keith Martin (St Catharine's)
- Duncan Maskell (Caius/Wolfson), biochemist and senior pro-vice chancellor of the University of Cambridge
- Peter Mathieson (Christ's), vice-chancellor of University of Hong Kong
- James Clerk Maxwell (Trinity)
- Robin Milner (King's), Turing Award winner
- César Milstein (Fitzwilliam/Darwin), Nobel Prize winner
- Peter Mitchell (Jesus), Nobel Prize winner
- John Keith Moffat (King's), Guggenheim Fellow, biologist
- Keith Moffatt (Trinity)
- Anna Moore
- Simon Conway Morris (St John's)
- Nevill Mott (Caius/St John's), Nobel Prize winner

==== N–R ====
- Roger Needham (St John's/Wolfson)
- Michael Neuberger (Trinity)
- Sir Isaac Newton (Trinity)
- Sir Robin Nicholson (St Catharine's/Christ's), Chief Scientific Adviser
- Ronald Norrish (Emmanuel), Nobel Prize winner
- Lawrence Ogilvie (Emmanuel), plant pathologist, entomologist, mycologist
- J. Robert Oppenheimer (Christ's), scientific director of the Manhattan Project
- Jeremiah Ostriker (unknown)
- William Oughtred (King's), inventor of the slide rule and the "×" symbol for multiplication
- Sir Charles Algernon Parsons (St John's)
- George Peacock (Trinity)
- Karl Pearson (King's)
- Sir Roger Penrose (St John's)
- Max Perutz (Peterhouse), Nobel Prize winner
- Joseph Pesce (Peterhouse)
- Anna Philpott (Selwyn)
- Sir Brian Pippard (Clare Hall)
- John Polkinghorne (Trinity/Queens'), Templeton Prize winner
- Sir John Pople (Trinity), Nobel Prize winner
- George Porter (Emmanuel), Nobel Prize winner
- Rodney Porter (Pembroke), Nobel Prize winner
- Cecil Powell (Sidney Sussex), Nobel Prize winner
- Reginald Punnett (Caius)
- Alfred Radcliffe-Brown (Trinity)
- Srinivasa Ramanujan (Trinity)
- Frank P. Ramsey (Magdalene/Trinity/King's), Ramsey theory, decision theory
- Norman F. Ramsey (Clare), Nobel Prize winner
- Sir John Randall (unknown)
- John Ray (St Catharine's)
- Lord Rayleigh (Trinity), Nobel Prize winner
- Martin Rees, Baron Rees of Ludlow (Trinity), Astronomer Royal
- Osborne Reynolds (Queens')
- Owen Richardson (Trinity), Nobel Prize winner
- W. H. R. Rivers (St John's)
- Steven Rose (King's)
- Klaus Roth (Peterhouse), Fields Medal winner
- Edward Routh (Peterhouse)
- Ram Parikshan Roy, professor of Botany; president of Indian Science Congress, 1972
- Christopher Rudd (unknown), immunologist
- Ernest Rutherford (Trinity), Nobel Prize winner
- Martin Ryle (Trinity), Nobel Prize winner

==== S–Z ====
- Barbara Sahakian (Clare Hall), professor of Clinical Neuropsychology
- Umar Saif (Trinity), computer science
- Abdus Salam (St John's), Nobel Prize winner
- Frederick Sanger (St John's), winner of two Nobel Prizes
- Vikram Sarabhai (St John's)
- Nicholas Saunderson (Christ's)
- Richard R. Schrock (unknown), Nobel Prize winner
- Dennis William Sciama (Trinity), physicist
- Sir Nicholas Shackleton (Clare)
- Rupert Sheldrake (Clare)
- Sir Charles Scott Sherrington (Fitzwilliam/Caius), Nobel Prize winner
- Simon Singh (Emmanuel)
- Herchel Smith (Emmanuel)
- John Maynard Smith (Trinity)
- Helen Sneddon (Christ's), chemist
- C. P. Snow (Christ's)
- Ian Stewart (Churchill), mathematician
- George Gabriel Stokes (Pembroke)
- Bjarne Stroustrup (Churchill), inventor of C++
- Audrey Stuckes (Newnham), material scientist
- John Sulston (Pembroke), Nobel Prize winner
- M. S. Swaminathan (Fitzwilliam), World Food Prize winner
- James Joseph Sylvester (St John's)
- Richard Synge (Trinity), Nobel Prize winner
- Albert Szent-Györgyi (Fitzwilliam), Nobel Prize winner
- Peter Guthrie Tait (Peterhouse)
- Simon Tatham (Trinity)
- Brook Taylor (St John's)
- Sir Geoffrey Ingram Taylor (Trinity)
- Andrew Teschendorff, researcher and academic
- Chris D. Thomas (Corpus)
- John Griggs Thompson (Churchill), Fields Medal winner
- Sir George Paget Thomson (Trinity), Nobel Prize winner
- J. J. Thomson (Trinity), Nobel Prize winner
- William Thomson, 1st Baron Kelvin (Peterhouse)
- Alexander Todd (Christ's), Nobel Prize winner
- Chai Keong Toh (King's)
- Zion Tse, professor of AI and Robotics
- Roger Y. Tsien (Churchill), Nobel Prize winner
- Alan Turing (King's)
- Neil Turok (Churchill), mathematician
- William Tutte (Trinity)
- Stephen Tweedie (Churchill), software developer
- Carina Tyrrell (Murray Edwards), physician scientist
- Srinivasan Varadarajan, chemist and Padma Bhushan awardee
- John Venn (Caius)
- Jemma Wadham, glacial biogeochemist, Antarctic researcher
- Sir John E. Walker (Sidney Sussex), Nobel Prize winner
- John Wallis (Emmanuel)
- Ernest Walton (Trinity), Nobel Prize winner
- James D. Watson (Clare), Nobel Prize winner
- Steven Weinberg (unknown), Nobel Prize winner
- David Wheeler (Trinity/Darwin)
- A.N. Whitehead (Trinity)
- E.T. Whittaker (Trinity)
- Sir Frank Whittle (Peterhouse)
- Sir Andrew Wiles (Clare)
- Sir Maurice Wilkes (St John's), Turing Award winner
- Maurice Wilkins (St John's), Nobel Prize winner
- Sir Ian Wilmut (Darwin)
- C. T. R. Wilson (Sidney Sussex), Nobel Prize winner
- Edward Adrian Wilson (Caius)
- J. Tuzo Wilson (St. John's)
- Sophie Wilson, computer scientist and software engineer, designed the Acorn Micro-Computer
- Sir Greg Winter (Trinity), Nobel Prize winner
- Ian H. Witten (Caius), mathematics, Hector Memorial Medal, IFIP Namur Award for Greenstone
- Andrew B. Wittkower (unknown), American Physical Society fellow
- William Hyde Wollaston (Caius), Copley Medal winner
- Thomas Young (Emmanuel)
- Christopher Zeeman (Christ's), mathematician
- Jenny Zhang (Corpus Christi), chemist

==== Astronauts ====
- Michael Foale (Queens'), NASA astronaut
- Nicholas Patrick (Trinity), NASA astronaut
- David Saint-Jacques (Corpus Christi), Canadian Space Agency astronaut
- Jennifer Sidey (Jesus), Canadian Space Agency astronaut

==== Engineers ====
- Phebe Mann, civil engineer of Institution of Civil Engineers (Hughes Hall)

=== Philosophers ===
==== A–M ====
- G. E. M. Anscombe (Newnham)
- Kwame Anthony Appiah (Clare)
- Sri Aurobindo (King's)
- Sir Francis Bacon (Trinity)
- Cristina Bicchieri (Wolfson)
- Simon Blackburn (Trinity/Churchill)
- Alain de Botton (Caius)
- R. B. Braithwaite (King's)
- C. D. Broad (Trinity)
- Myles Burnyeat (King's/Robinson)
- Jeremy Butterfield (Trinity)
- Gary Chartier (Queens')
- Samuel Clarke (Caius)
- Stephen R. L. Clark (Queens')
- William Kingdon Clifford (Trinity)
- Nathan Cofnas (Emmanuel)
- Tim Crane (Trinity)
- Aleister Crowley (Trinity)
- Ralph Cudworth (Emmanuel/Christ's/Clare)
- Richard Cumberland (Magdalene)
- Don Cupitt (Emmanuel)
- Desiderius Erasmus (Queens')
- Paul Feyerabend (unknown)
- Peter Geach (unknown)
- Raymond Geuss (none)
- Mary Louise Gill
- Lydia Goehr
- Susan Haack (New Hall)
- Ian Hacking (Trinity)
- Charles Hampden-Turner (Trinity)
- David Hartley (Jesus)
- Mary Hesse (unknown)
- Thomas Hobbes (St John's)
- Sir Muhammad Iqbal (Trinity)
- Nicholas Jardine (Darwin)
- Emily Elizabeth Constance Jones (Girton)
- Philip Kitcher (Christ's)
- Georg Kreisel (Trinity)
- Martin Kusch (unknown)
- Imre Lakatos (King's)
- Casimir Lewy (Trinity)
- E. J. Lowe (Fitzwilliam)
- John Lucas (Corpus Christi)
- Donald M. MacKinnon (unknown)
- Ruth Barcan Marcus (Clare Hall)
- Moez Masoud (Fitzwilliam)
- Margaret Masterman (Lucy Cavendish)
- Emil Mattiesen
- Marshall McLuhan (Trinity Hall)
- J. M. E. McTaggart (Trinity)
- Hugh Mellor (Pembroke/Darwin)
- G. E. Moore (Trinity)
- Henry More (Christ's)
- Peter Munz (unknown)
- Iris Murdoch (Newnham)

==== N–Z ====
- Michael Oakeshott (Caius)
- C. K. Ogden (Magdalene)
- Onora O'Neill (Newnham)
- G. E. L. Owen (unknown)
- William Paley (Christ's)
- Sir Karl Popper (Darwin)
- Graham Priest (St John's)
- Frank P. Ramsey (Magdalene/Trinity/King's)
- Bertrand Russell (Trinity), Nobel Prize winner
- George Santayana (King's)
- Duns Scotus (unknown)
- Roger Scruton (Jesus/Peterhouse)
- Henry Sidgwick (Trinity)
- B. F. Skinner (Churchill)
- Timothy Smiley (Clare)
- John Smith (Emmanuel/Queens')
- Timothy Sprigge (Caius)
- George Steiner (Churchill)
- C. L. Stevenson (unknown)
- Leo Strauss (Caius)
- Galen Strawson (unknown)
- Stephen Toulmin (King's)
- John Venn (Caius)
- Michael Walzer (unknown)
- James Ward (Fitzwilliam/Trinity)
- William Whewell (Trinity)
- Benjamin Whichcote (Emmanuel/King's)
- Alfred North Whitehead (Trinity)
- Sir Bernard Williams (King's)
- John Wisdom (Fitzwilliam/Trinity)
- Ludwig Wittgenstein (Trinity)
- John Worthington (Emmanuel/Jesus)
- Crispin Wright (Trinity)

=== Economists ===
- R. G. D. Allen (Sidney Sussex)
- Andrew Bailey (Queens'), governor of the Bank of England (2020–)
- Rowland Baring, 3rd Earl of Cromer (Trinity), governor of the Bank of England (1961–1966)
- Peter Thomas Bauer (Caius)
- Charlie Bean (Emmanuel)
- David Bensusan-Butt (King's)
- Christopher Bliss (King's)
- D. G. Champernowne (King's/Trinity)
- Ha-Joon Chang (unknown)
- Robert Chote (Queens')
- Cameron Cobbold, 1st Baron Cobbold (King's), governor of the Bank of England (1949–1961)
- Alfred Clayton Cole (Trinity), governor of the Bank of England (1911–1913)
- John James Cowperthwaite (Christ's)
- Walter Cunliffe, 1st Baron Cunliffe (Trinity), governor of the Bank of England (1913–1918)
- Angus Deaton (Fitzwilliam), Nobel Prize winner
- Gérard Debreu (Churchill), Nobel Prize winner
- Stanley Dennison (Trinity/Caius)
- Maurice Dobb (Pembroke/Trinity)
- John Eatwell, Baron Eatwell (Queens')
- Robert Fogel (Trinity), Nobel Prize winner*
- Milton Friedman (Caius), Nobel Prize winner*
- John Kenneth Galbraith (Trinity)
- Pierangelo Garegnani (Trinity)
- Sir Edward George (Emmanuel), governor of the Bank of England (1993–2003)
- Oliver Hart (King's/Churchill), Nobel Prize winner
- Sir Gilbert Heathcote, 1st Baronet (Christ's)
- Sir Hubert Henderson (Emmanuel/Clare)
- Noreena Hertz (King's)
- John Hicks (Caius), Nobel Prize winner
- John C. Hull (unknown)
- Harry Johnson (Jesus)
- Richard Kahn (King's)
- Nicholas Kaldor (King's)
- John Maynard Keynes (King's)
- Mervyn King (King's/St John's), governor of the Bank of England (2003–2013)
- Patrick Lynch (Peterhouse)
- Thomas Malthus (Jesus)
- Alfred Marshall (St John's)
- James Meade (Christ's/Trinity), Nobel Prize winner
- Murray Milgate (Trinity/Queens')
- James Mirrlees (Trinity), Nobel Prize winner
- Robert Neild (Trinity)
- Montagu Norman, 1st Baron Norman (King's), governor of the Bank of England (1920–1944)
- Douglass North (Girton), Nobel Prize winner*
- Luigi Pasinetti (King's)
- Arthur Cecil Pigou (King's)
- Rogelio Ramírez de la O (Fitzwilliam)
- Frank P. Ramsey (Magdalene/Trinity/King's)
- Gordon Richardson (Caius), governor of the Bank of England (1973–1983)
- Dennis Robertson (Trinity)
- Austin Robinson (Sidney Sussex)
- Joan Robinson (Girton/Newnham/King's)
- Amartya Sen (Trinity), Nobel Prize winner
- Ajit Singh (Queens')
- Piero Sraffa (Trinity)
- Joseph Stiglitz (Caius/Fitzwilliam), Nobel Prize winner
- Richard Stone (Caius/King's), Nobel Prize winner
- John Vaizey (Queens')
- Isabella Weber (unknown)
- Yuen Pau Woo (unknown)

* Not part of official Cambridge Nobel count.

=== Historians ===
==== A–M ====
- David Abulafia (King's)
- Lord Acton (Trinity)
- Frank Adcock (King's)
- Liaquat Ahamed (Trinity), Pulitzer Prize winner
- David Armitage (St Catharine's)
- Tony Badger (Sidney Sussex/Clare)
- Jonathan Bate (St. Catharine's/Trinity Hall)
- George Ewart Bean (Pembroke)
- Paul Bew (Pembroke)
- David Brading (Pembroke)
- Asa Briggs (Sidney Sussex)
- Lawrence Brockett (Trinity)
- Sir Denis William Brogan (Peterhouse)
- Hugh Brogan (St John's)
- Oscar Browning (King's)
- J. B. Bury (Trinity)
- Sir Herbert Butterfield (Peterhouse)
- Angus Calder (King's)
- Sir David Cannadine (Clare/Christ's)
- E. H. Carr (Trinity)
- Hector Munro Chadwick (Clare)
- John Chadwick (Corpus Christi)
- Sir John Clapham (King's)
- Alfred Cobban (Caius)
- Simon Coleman (unknown)
- Linda Colley (Girton/Newnham/Christ's)
- Patrick Collinson (Pembroke)
- John S. Conway (St John's)
- G. G. Coulton (St Catharine's)
- Maurice Cowling (Jesus/Peterhouse)
- Jodocus Crull (King's)
- William Dalrymple (Trinity)
- Ken Dark, archaeologist (Sidney Sussex)
- Isaac Deutscher (unknown)
- Rhoda Dorsey (unknown)
- John Elliott (Trinity)
- Sir Geoffrey Elton (Clare)
- Richard J. Evans (Caius)
- Robert Evans (Jesus)
- Niall Ferguson (Christ's/Peterhouse)
- Orlando Figes (Caius/Trinity)
- Sir James Frazer (Trinity)
- David J. Garrow (Homerton), Pulitzer Prize winner
- Gillian Gill (New Hall)
- Paul Ginsborg (Queens'/Churchill)
- Thomas Gray (Peterhouse/Pembroke)
- E. H. H. Green (St John's)
- Bernard Green
- John Guy (Clare)
- Sir (Hrothgar) John Habakkuk (St John's)
- Alfred Cort Haddon (Christ's), father of modern anthropology
- Basil Liddell Hart (Corpus Christi)
- Tobias Hecht (Clare Hall), American anthropologist
- Marko Attila Hoare (Robinson)
- Eric Hobsbawm (King's)
- Richard Holmes (Emmanuel)
- Harold James (Caius/Peterhouse)
- Lisa Jardine (Newnham/Jesus/King's)
- Nicholas Jardine (King's/Darwin)
- Tony Judt (King's)
- Colin Kidd (Caius)
- Victor Kiernan (Trinity)
- Alexander William Kinglake (Trinity)
- James Klugmann (Trinity)
- Wilbur Knorr (unknown)
- David Knowles (Christ's/Peterhouse)
- John Langbein (Trinity Hall)
- Peter Laslett (St John's)
- John Le Neve (Trinity)
- John Leland (Christ's), father of English history
- Carenza Lewis (Corpus Christi)
- Thomas Babington Macaulay (Trinity)
- Diarmaid MacCulloch (Churchill)
- Sir Henry James Sumner Maine (Pembroke/Trinity Hall)
- F. W. Maitland (Trinity)
- Peter Mathias (Jesus/Queens'/Downing)
- Keith Middlemas (Pembroke)

==== N–Z ====
- Joseph Needham (Caius)
- Roy Franklin Nichols (unknown), Pulitzer Prize winner
- C. Northcote Parkinson (Emmanuel)
- Henry Pelling (St John's)
- Harold Perkin (Jesus)
- Sir John H. Plumb (Christ's/King's)
- Justin Pollard (Downing)
- Sir Frederick Pollock, 3rd Baronet (Trinity)
- Roy Porter (Christ's/Churchill)
- Sir Michael Postan (Peterhouse)
- Eileen Power (Girton)
- Sir George Prothero (King's)
- Andrew Roberts (Caius)
- George Rudé (Trinity)
- Sir Steven Runciman (Trinity)
- Dominic Sandbrook (Jesus)
- Simon Schama (Christ's)
- Arthur M. Schlesinger Jr. (Peterhouse), Pulitzer Prize winner
- Karl Schweizer (Peterhouse)
- Simon Sebag-Montefiore (Caius)
- Sir John Robert Seeley (Christ's/Caius)
- Quentin Skinner (Caius/Christ's)
- Denis Mack Smith (Peterhouse)
- Sir Henry Spelman (Trinity)
- Tom Stannage (unknown)
- David Starkey (Fitzwilliam)
- Norman Stone (Caius/Jesus/Trinity)
- Harold McCarter Taylor (Clare)
- Harold Temperley (King's/Peterhouse)
- Hugh Thomas, Baron Thomas of Swynnerton (Queens’)
- Dorothy Thompson (Girton)
- E. P. Thompson (Corpus Christi)
- David Thomson (Sidney Sussex)
- G. M. Trevelyan (Trinity)
- Hugh Trevor-Roper (Peterhouse)
- Shallet Turner (Peterhouse)
- George Waddington (Trinity)
- Sir Adolphus William Ward (Peterhouse)
- Colin Webb (Clare)
- Charles Wilson (Jesus)
- Robert M. Young (King's)

==== Linguists ====
- Keith Brown (Pembroke), editor-in-chief of the Encyclopedia of Language and Linguistics
- Leslie Peter Johnson (Pembroke), Germanist
- John Lyons (Christ's), semanticist
- Peter Hugoe Matthews (St John's), morphologist
- April McMahon (Selwyn), evolutionary linguist
- Rebecca Posner (Girton), Romance philologist
- Ian Roberts (Downing), syntactician
- Ghil'ad Zuckermann (Churchill), revivalist, contact linguist, lexicologist

=== Classicists ===
- D. R. Shackleton Bailey (Caius)
- Dame Mary Beard (Newnham)
- Gábor Betegh (Christ's)
- Angus M. Bowie (Emmanuel)
- Myles Burnyeat (Robinson)
- Paul Cartledge (Clare)
- James Clackson (Jesus)
- Robin Cormack (Wolfson)
- James Duff Duff (Trinity)
- Richard Duncan-Jones (Caius)
- P. E. Easterling (Newnham)
- Peter Garnsey (Jesus)
- Roy Gibson (Sidney Sussex)
- Simon Goldhill (King's)
- Emily Gowers (St John's/Trinity)
- Emily Greenwood
- Philip Hardie (Trinity)
- J. G. W. Henderson (King's)
- A. E. Housman (St John's)
- Richard L. Hunter (Trinity)
- Christopher Kelly (Corpus Christi)
- G. E. R. Lloyd (King's/Darwin)
- Helen Lovatt (Pembroke)
- Martin Millett (Fitzwilliam)
- Stephen Oakley (Emmanuel)
- Robin Osborne (King's)
- Denys Page (Trinity/Jesus)
- Michael Reeve (Pembroke)
- Victoria Rimell (King's)
- Michael Scott (Christ's/Darwin)
- David Sedley (Christ's)
- Anthony Snodgrass (Clare)
- Caroline Vout (Newnham/Christ's)
- Andrew Wallace-Hadrill (Sidney Sussex)
- Tim Whitmarsh (St John's)

== Armed forces ==
- Charles Cornwallis (Clare), lieutenant general
- Oliver Cromwell (Sidney Sussex), lord protector
- Sir Richard Dearlove (Queens'/Pembroke), head of Secret Intelligence Service
- Thomas Fairfax, 3rd Lord Fairfax of Cameron (St John's), Parliamentary commander-in-chief during the English Civil War
- Billy Fiske (Trinity Hall), Second World War RAF pilot
- Frank Ludlow (Sidney Sussex), botanist and Army officer
- Louis Mountbatten (Christ's), first sea lord
- Siegfried Sassoon (Clare), poet; lieutenant, Sussex Yeomanry; awarded the Military Cross for actions during World War I
- Arthur Tedder (Magdalene), First World War RAF pilot
- Sir Peter Anthony Wall (Selwyn), chief of General Staff, and chief royal engineer

== Educationalists ==
=== A–M ===
- Theodore Acland (King's), headmaster of Norwich School
- Syed Ali Akbar (Peterhouse), major educator of Hyderabad State
- Frederick Attenborough (Emmanuel), principal of the University of Leicester and the West London Institute of Higher Education
- John Haden Badley (Trinity), founder and first headmaster of Bedales School
- Isaac Barrow (Peterhouse), founder of King William's College
- St. Vincent Beechey (Caius), founder and first headmaster of Rossall School
- Frank Bell (Peterhouse), founder and first chairman of the Bell Educational Trust
- Niels Bohr (Trinity), founder of the Institute of Theoretical Physics in Copenhagen
- Lee Bollinger (Clare Hall), president of Columbia University and the University of Michigan
- William Grant Broughton (unknown), founder of The King's School, Parramatta, Australia's first independent school
- Sir Dominic Cadbury (Trinity), chancellor of the University of Birmingham
- Henry Cavendish (Peterhouse), co-founder of the Royal Institution
- Lord William Cavendish (Trinity), founder of Eastbourne College and chancellor of London University and Cambridge University
- Sir William Cecil (St John's), responsible for revitalising Stamford School in 1548
- Hugh Childers (Trinity), founder of the University of Melbourne
- Chuah Joon Huang (Wolfson / Gonville & Caius), president and CEO of Southern University College
- Sir Samuel Curran (St John's), founder, first principal and first vice-chancellor of the University of Strathclyde
- Emily Davies (Girton), founder of Girton College, the first residential higher education institution for women
- C. D. Deshmukh (Jesus), vice-chancellor of the University of Delhi
- Arthur Dunn (King's), founder and second master of Ludgrove School
- Henry Dunster (Magdalene), first president of Harvard
- Nathaniel Eaton (Trinity), first schoolmaster at Harvard
- John Eliot (Jesus), founder of Roxbury Latin School, the oldest school in North America
- Sir Christopher Frayling (Churchill), writer and educationalist
- Anthony Giddens (King's), director of the London School of Economics
- Eli Gottlieb (St John's), director of the Mandel Leadership Institute
- Sir Brandon Gough (Jesus), chancellor of the University of East Anglia and chairman of the Higher Education Funding Council for England
- Sir Hari Singh Gour (Downing), founder and vice-chancellor of the University of Delhi, University of Nagpur and University of Sagar
- Malcolm Grant (Clare), provost and president of University College London
- Sir Thomas Gresham (Caius), founder and first benefactor of Gresham College
- Thomas de Grey, 2nd Earl de Grey (St John's), co-founder of the Royal Institute of British Architects
- Sir Peter Hall (St Catharine's), founder of the Royal Shakespeare Company and director of the National Theatre
- Andrew D. Hamilton (unknown), current vice-chancellor of the University of Oxford
- John Harvard (Emmanuel), co-founder and first benefactor of Harvard
- Elizabeth Phillips Hughes (Newnham), de facto founder of Hughes Hall, Cambridge and campaigner for women's right to education
- David Lloyd Johnston (unknown), former president of the University of Waterloo
- Marty Kaplan (unknown), professor at the USC Annenberg School for Communication and founding director of the Norman Lear Center
- Sir John Kingman (Pembroke), vice-chancellor of the University of Bristol and director of the Isaac Newton Institute
- Thomas Langley (Corpus Christi), founder of Durham School
- George Lascelles, 7th Earl of Harewood (King's), first chancellor of the University of York
- Edward Latymer (St John's), founder of The Latymer School and Latymer Upper School
- Arthur Li (unknown), vice-chancellor of the Chinese University of Hong Kong
- Thomas Linacre (St John's), founder of the Royal College of Physicians
- Anthony R. M. Little (Corpus Christi), headmaster of Eton College
- Adam Loftus (Trinity), co-founder and first Provost of Trinity College, Dublin
- Roger Lupton (King's), provost of Eton College and founder of Sedbergh School
- Jack Meyer (unknown), founder of Millfield School and St Lawrence College, Athens
- Sir Walter Mildmay (Christ's), founder of Emmanuel College, Cambridge

=== N–Z ===
- Bernard Orchard (Fitzwilliam), re-founder of St Benedict's School, led it to become the only Catholic day school of public school status
- Karl Pearson (King's), founder of the world's first university statistics department at University College London
- Stephen Perse (Caius), founder of The Perse School
- John Pye-Smith (Homerton), co-founder of Mill Hill School
- Dr John Rae (Sidney Sussex), headmaster of Westminster School, writer and broadcaster
- Alison Richard (Newnham), provost of Yale University and vice-chancellor of Cambridge University
- Sir Evelyn Robert de Rothschild (Trinity), governor of the London School of Economics and council member at RADA
- Sir Nicholas Shackleton (Clare), Cambridge professor and president of the International Union for Quaternary Research (INQUA)
- Sheung-Wai Tam (Robinson), president of The Open University of Hong Kong and chairman of St. Paul's Co-educational College
- Shahid Aziz Siddiqi (Wolfson), vice-chancellor of the Ziauddin Medical University
- Henry Sidgwick (Trinity), co-founder of the Society for Psychical Research and Newnham College, Cambridge
- John Sperling (King's), founder of the University of Phoenix
- Tristram Stuart (Trinity), author and sustainability campaigner
- Sir Thomas Sutton (unknown), founder of Charterhouse School
- Geoffrey Thomas (Churchill), president of Kellogg College, Oxford
- Edward Thring (King's), headmaster of Uppingham School and founder of the Headmasters' Conference
- Sir John Tusa (Trinity/Wolfson), chairman of the University of the Arts London (2007–2013)
- William Waynflete (King's Hall), founder of Magdalen College, Oxford and Magdalen College School
- William Wentworth (Peterhouse), de facto founder of the University of Sydney
- John Whitgift (Queens'/Pembroke/Trinity), founder of Whitgift School and Trinity School and, indirectly, Old Palace School
- Sir David Glyndwr Tudor Williams (Emmanuel/Wolfson), chancellor of Swansea University and vice-chancellor of Cambridge University
- James Wilson (St John's), headmaster of Clifton College
- James Wood, epidemiologist at University of Cambridge
- Michael Young (Churchill), co-founder of The Open University

== Entrepreneurs, business leaders and philanthropists ==
=== A–M ===
- Marcus Agius (Trinity Hall), financier and businessman, chairman of Barclays
- Toyin Ajayi (King's), co-founder and chief executive officer of Cityblock Health
- Robert Alexander, Baron Alexander of Weedon (King's), chairman of NatWest
- Simon Ambrose (Magdalene), business entrepreneur, winner of The Apprentice
- Simon Arora (unknown), billionaire chief executive officer of B & M
- Sir Hugh Barton (Trinity), chairman and managing director of Jardine, Matheson & Co
- Peter Bazalgette (Fitzwilliam), media expert, creative director figure at the global television firm Endemol
- Sir Max Bemrose (Clare), industrialist
- Karan Bilimoria (Sidney Sussex), entrepreneur, co-founder and chairman of Cobra Beer
- Lee Bollinger (Clare Hall), chair of the Federal Reserve Bank of New York board of directors
- John Browne (St John's), chief executive of BP
- Stewart Butterfield (Clare College), co-founder of Slack Technologies and Flickr
- Sir Egbert Cadbury (Trinity), managing director of the British confectionery firm Cadbury
- Dame Elizabeth Cadbury (unknown), philanthropist, founder of the Royal Orthopaedic Hospital
- Peter Cadbury (Trinity), entrepreneur, founder and first chairman of Westward Television
- Clementine Chambon, chemical engineer, founder of Oorja Solutions
- David Cleevely (unknown), entrepreneur and international telecommunications expert, co-founder and chief executive of Abcam plc
- Mark Coombs (St. John's), billionaire chief executive officer of Ashmore Group
- Gerald Corbett (Pembroke), chief executive of Railtrack, chairman Moneysupermarket.com and formerly Woolworths
- Charles "Nick" Corfield (St John's), Silicon Valley entrepreneur, inventor of Adobe FrameMaker
- Peter Cowley (Fitzwilliam), former chair, Cambridge Angels, president emeritus, EBAN
- Sir Andrew Crockett (Queens'), general manager of the Bank for International Settlements, member of JPMorgan Chase and Group of Thirty
- Andrew Currie (unknown), billionaire director at Ineos
- Gavyn Davies (St John's), managing director of Goldman Sachs investment bank and chairman of the BBC
- Sir C. D. Deshmukh (Jesus), governor of the Reserve Bank of India (1943–1949)
- Dinesh Dhamija (Fitzwilliam), founder, chairman and chief executive of the online travel agency Ebookers
- Ray Dolby (Pembroke), audio technologies inventor and founder of Dolby
- Massimo Ellul (Judge Business School), marketing and management consultant; philanthropist
- Mohamed A. El-Erian (Queens'), chief executive of PIMCO investment firm
- John B. Evans (1938–2004), media executive
- Roger W. Ferguson Jr. (Pembroke), vice chairman of U.S. Federal Reserve System, president and chief executive officer of TIAA, trustee of Group of Thirty
- Sir Brandon Gough (Jesus), business leader, chairman of Yorkshire Water, Coopers & Lybrand, and De La Rue plc
- Roger J. Hamilton (Trinity), social entrepreneur, futurist, creator of Wealth Dynamics, Talent Dynamics, founder of Entrepreneurs Institute
- David Harding (St. Catherine's), billionaire founder and chief executive officer of Winton Group
- Barney Harford (Clare), former chief executive officer of Orbitz.com and chief operating officer of Uber
- Clive Fiske Harrison (Trinity Hall), investment banker, chairman of Fiske plc
- Demis Hassabis (Queens'), entrepreneur, founder of Deepmind
- Hermann Hauser (King's), electronics entrepreneur, co-founder of Acorn Computers
- Johnny Hon (Hughes Hall), Hong Kong–born international businessman and founder of the Global Group
- Andy Hopper (Corpus Christi), electronics entrepreneur, academic
- Michael Johns (Caius), healthcare executive, former White House speechwriter
- Sir Paul Judge (Trinity), businessman and entrepreneur, director of Standard Bank Group
- Nihad Kabir (unknown), president of Metropolitan Chamber of Commerce and Industry, Dhaka
- Jonathan Kestenbaum, Baron Kestenbaum (born 1959), chief operating officer of investment trust RIT Capital Partners
- Sir Henry Keswick (Trinity), chairman of Jardine Matheson Holdings
- Hosein Khajeh-Hosseiny (Trinity Hall), founder of OpenX Innovations, trustee of The Brookings Institution
- Andrew Kuper, founder and chief executive officer of LeapFrog Investments
- Raymond Kwok (Jesus), Hong Kong property billionaire
- Randy Lerner (Clare), American sports entrepreneur, owner of the Cleveland Browns
- Edward Lewis (Trinity), founder of Decca Records
- Sir David Li (Selwyn), chairman and chief executive of the Bank of East Asia
- Paddy Lowe (Sidney Sussex), engineering director of the McLaren Formula One racing team
- Michael Lynch (Christ's), software and internet entrepreneur; co-founder and chief executive of Autonomy Corporation
- David Lytton Cobbold, 2nd Baron Cobbold (King's), proprietor of Knebworth House; founder of the Knebworth Rock Festival
- Zia Mody (Selwyn), founding partner of AZB & Partners, India's second-largest law firm
- Liam Mooney (Hughes Hall), entrepreneur living in Dubai
- Nathan Myhrvold (unknown), former chief technology officer at Microsoft; co-founder of Intellectual Ventures

=== N–Z ===
- Nigel Newton (Selwyn), founder and chief executive of Bloomsbury Publishing Plc
- Edwin Nixon (Selwyn), successively managing director, chairman and chief executive of IBM [UK], then chairman of Amersham
- Archie Norman (Emmanuel), chairman of ITV plc and formerly Kingfisher plc and Asda
- Christian Purslow (Fitzwilliam), managing director of Liverpool Football Club and founder of MidOcean Partners private equity firm
- Sir Michael Rake (unknown), chairman of BT Group and formerly director of Barclays, McGraw-Hill and the Financial Reporting Council
- Sir Benegal Rama Rau (King's), governor of the Reserve Bank of India (1949–1957)
- John Reece (Queens'), billionaire chief finance officer at Ineos
- Sir Harry Ricardo (Trinity), pioneering engine designer, founder of Ricardo plc (1927)
- Charles Rolls (Trinity), co-founder of Rolls-Royce, the automobile and aviation company
- Anthony Gustav de Rothschild (Trinity), managing partner of N M Rothschild & Sons, art collector and race horse breeder
- Edmund Leopold de Rothschild (Trinity), chairman of N M Rothschild & Sons, art collector and noted horticulturalist
- Sir Evelyn Robert de Rothschild (Trinity), chairman of N M Rothschild & Sons and director of IBM United Kingdom Holdings Limited
- Leopold de Rothschild (Trinity), banker, art collector and thoroughbred race horse breeder
- Lionel Nathan de Rothschild (Trinity), banker, Conservative politician and creator and manager of Exbury Gardens
- Mayer Amschel de Rothschild (Magdalene/Trinity), banker, High Sheriff of Buckinghamshire and race horse owner
- Nathan Rothschild, 1st Baron Rothschild (Trinity), managing partner of N M Rothschild & Sons and funder of the Suez Canal construction
- Victor Rothschild, 3rd Baron Rothschild (Trinity), chairman of N M Rothschild & Sons and biologist
- Walter Rothschild, 2nd Baron Rothschild (Magdalene), banker, Liberal politician and pioneering zoologist
- David Sainsbury (King's), Sainsbury's supermarket fortune heir; philanthropist
- Sir Robert Sainsbury (Pembroke), chairman of Sainsbury's supermarket (1967–1969)
- Simon Sainsbury (Trinity), director and deputy chairman of Sainsbury's supermarket
- Apoorva Shah (unknown), managing director, co-head of M&A Asia ex-Japan, Nomura
- Rod Smallwood (Trinity), music entrepreneur, manager of Iron Maiden, co-founder of Sanctuary Records
- Martin Sorrell (Christ's), founder of WPP, the world's largest advertising group
- John Sperling (King's), for-profit education entrepreneur, founder of the University of Phoenix
- Dennis Stevenson, Baron Stevenson of Coddenham (King's), director of BSkyB (1994–2001), chairman of HBOS (1999–2008)
- Stephen B. Streater (Trinity), electronics entrepreneur, founder of Eidos
- Roger Tamraz (unknown), international banker and oil industry entrepreneur, director of Intra Bank
- Dorabji Tata (Caius), Indian industrialist and philanthropist, chairman of the Tata Group
- J.R.D Tata (unknown), French-Indian aviator, industrialist, entrepreneur, chairman of the Tata Group
- David Thomson (Trinity), Canada's wealthiest family, Thomson Corp. (information services)
- Kenneth Thomson (St John's) & David Thomson (Selwyn), Canada's wealthiest family, Thomson Corp. (information services)
- Onyeche Tifase (unknown), managing director and chief executive officer of Siemens Nigeria and president of Nigerian-German Chamber of Commerce
- Sam Toy (Fitzwilliam), chairman of Ford Motor Company [UK]
- Geoff Travis (Churchill), founder of Rough Trade Records and Rough Trade Music Store
- David Triesman, Baron Triesman (King's), business leader, Labour life peer and disgraced ex-chairman of The FA
- Sir John Tusa (Trinity/Wolfson), managing director of the Barbican Arts Centre (1995–2007) and the BBC World Service (1986–1993), chairman of the Victoria and Albert Museum (2007)
- Neville Wadia (Trinity), Bombay industrialist and philanthropist
- Sir Tim Waterstone (St Catharine's), founder of Waterstone's (1982), the largest specialist bookseller in the UK
- Samuel Whitbread (St John's), early owner of Whitbread & Co Ltd brewing firm, Whig politician
- William Henry Whitbread (Trinity), managing partner of Whitbread & Co Ltd brewing firm, Whig and Liberal politician
- Tony Wilson (Jesus), music and youth culture entrepreneur, founder of Factory Records and owner of The Haçienda nightclub
- Daniel Yergin (unknown), founder of Cambridge Energy Research Associates and Pulitzer Prize winner
- Xin Zhang (Wolfson), founder and chief executive officer of SOHO China
- Zhang Zetian (King's), billionaire, chief fashion adviser at JD.com

== The law ==
=== Judges and lawyers ===
- Charles Sterling Acolatse, justice of the Supreme Court of Ghana (1964–1965)
- Aitzaz Ahsan (Downing), president of the Supreme Court Bar Association of Pakistan (1990–2007)
- Mary Arden (Girton), first female High Court judge to be assigned to the Chancery Division; justice of the Supreme Court of the United Kingdom (2018–2022)
- Mirza Hameedullah Beg (Trinity), chief justice of the Supreme Court of India (1977–1978)
- Chris Bentley (Wolfson), attorney general of Ontario (2007–2011)
- Sir Louis Blom-Cooper (Fitzwilliam), major lawyer specialising in public law and co-founder of Amnesty International
- Lee Bollinger (Clare Hall), US High Court lawyer
- Sir Dennis Byron (Fitzwilliam), chief justice of the Eastern Caribbean Supreme Court (1996–1999), president of the International Criminal Tribunal for Rwanda (2007–)
- Choo Han Teck (Hughes Hall), justice of the Supreme Court of Singapore (2003–)
- Kenneth Clarke (Caius), British lord chancellor (2010–2012)
- Paul Clement (Darwin), acting attorney general of the United States (2007)
- Sir Edward Coke (Trinity), chief justice of the King's Bench (1613–1616), chief justice of the Common Pleas (1606–1613), attorney general for England and Wales (1594–1606), widely regarded as the greatest English jurist of the Elizabethan and Jacobean eras; was influential on early American law
- Lawrence Collins, Baron Collins of Mapesbury (Downing), one of the first justices of the Supreme Court of the United Kingdom (2009–2011); general editor of Dicey & Morris, the standard reference work on conflict of laws, since 1987
- Alvin Robert Cornelius (Selwyn), chief justice of the Supreme Court of Pakistan (1960–1968)
- Professor James Crawford (Jesus), judge of the International Court of Justice (2015–2021)
- Charles Falconer (Queens'), British lord chancellor (2003–2007)
- Anthony Gates (Fitzwilliam), chief justice of the High Court of Fiji (2008–2019)
- Elizabeth Gloster, judge of the Court of Appeal of England and Wales (2013–2018) and vice-president of the Civil Division; first female judge of the Commercial Court
- Peter Goldsmith, Baron Goldsmith (Caius), attorney general for England, Wales and Northern Ireland (2001–2007)
- Sir Hari Singh Gour (Downing), author of the Indian Penal Code, member of the Legislative Assembly
- Hugh Griffiths, Baron Griffiths (St John's), one of the Lords of Appeal in Ordinary (1985–1993)
- Joseph Grimberg, first to be appointed senior counsel in Singapore and current senior consultant in Drew & Napier, a leading law firm in Singapore
- Brenda Hale, Baroness Hale of Richmond (Girton/Newnham), the only woman ever to be appointed as one of the Lords of Appeal in Ordinary (2004–2009), then justice of the Supreme Court of the United Kingdom (2009–2013), first female deputy president (2013–2017) and president (2017–2020) of the Supreme Court of the United Kingdom
- Mohammad Hidayatullah (Trinity), chief justice of the Supreme Court of India (1968–1970), first Muslim to attain the post
- Rosalyn Higgins (Girton), first female International Court of Justice judge, president (2006–2009)
- Patrick Hodge, Lord Hodge (Corpus Christi), justice of the Supreme Court of the United Kingdom since 2013; deputy president of the Supreme Court of the United Kingdom since 2020
- Karl Hudson-Phillips (Selwyn), International Criminal Court judge, Trinidad and Tobago legal advisor and politician
- Ahmad Mohamed Ibrahim (St John's), attorney-general of Singapore (1965–1967)
- Derry Irvine (Christ's), British lord chancellor (1997–2003), mentor of Tony Blair and Cherie Booth
- Sir Rupert Jackson (Jesus), judge of the Court of Appeal of England and Wales (2008–2018)
- Professor Robert Jennings (Downing; Jesus), judge of the International Court of Justice (1982–1991), later president (1991–1994)
- Anthony Julius (Jesus), lawyer in Princess Diana and David Irving cases
- Mahomed Hameed Ullah Khan (Christ's), former chief justice of Hyderabad
- Makhdoom Ali Khan (Corpus Christi), attorney general of Pakistan (2001–2007)
- Awn Shawkat Al-Khasawneh (Queens'), International Court of Justice judge (2000–2011)
- Susan Kiefel (Wolfson), 13th chief justice of Australia (2017–2023); first woman to hold this position
- David Kitchin, Lord Kitchin (Fitzwilliam), justice of the Supreme Court of the United Kingdom since 2018
- Sir Elihu Lauterpacht (Trinity), International Court of Justice lawyer
- Sir Hersch Lauterpacht (unknown), judge of the International Court of Justice (1955–1960), member of the UN's International Law Commission (1952–1954)
- George Leggatt, Lord Leggatt (King's), Justice of the Supreme Court of the United Kingdom since 2020
- Andrew Li (Fitzwilliam), chief justice of Hong Kong (1997–2010)
- Sir Richard May (Selwyn), major judge, British representative on the UN's International Criminal Tribunal for the former Yugoslavia
- Sir Robert Megarry (Trinity Hall), chancellor of the High Court 1976–1985
- Peter Millett, Baron Millett (Trinity Hall), one of the Lords of Appeal in Ordinary 1998–2004
- Zia Mody (Selwyn), founding partner of AZB & Partners, India's second-largest law firm
- Michael Mustill, Baron Mustill (St John's College), one of the Lords of Appeal in Ordinary 1992–1997
- Donald Nicholls, Baron Nicholls of Birkenhead (Trinity Hall), one of the Lords of Appeal in Ordinary 1994–2007
- Peter Oliver, Baron Oliver of Aylmerton (Trinity Hall), one of the Lords of Appeal in Ordinary 1986–1991
- Chan Seng Onn (Hughes Hall), justice of the Supreme Court of Singapore (2007–2022)
- Hisashi Owada (Trinity), International Court of Justice judge, president (2009–2012)
- Nicholas Phillips, Baron Phillips of Worth Matravers (King's), lord chief justice of England and Wales (2005–2008) and president of the Supreme Court of the United Kingdom (2009–2012)
- V. K. Rajah, attorney-general of Singapore (2014–2017), former judge of appeal of the Supreme Court of Singapore (2007–2014)
- Sir Benegal Rama Rau (King's), vice-chairman of the UN's International Law Commission (1949–1952)
- Peter Rawlinson, Baron Rawlinson of Ewell (Christ's), attorney general for England and Wales
- James Reid, Baron Reid (Jesus), one of the Lords of Appeal in Ordinary (1948–1975)
- David Richards, Lord Richards of Camberwell (Trinity), justice of the Supreme Court of the United Kingdom since 2022
- Vivien Rose (Trinity), justice of the Supreme Court of the United Kingdom since 2021
- Patricia A. Rowbotham (LL.M. 1984), justice of the Alberta Court of Appeal, Canada
- Philip Sales, Lord Sales (Churchill), justice of the Supreme Court of the United Kingdom since 2019
- James Scarlett, 1st Baron Abinger (Trinity) (1769–1844), judge, lord chief baron of the exchequer
- Sir Peter Singer (Selwyn), judge of the High Court of Justice of England and Wales (1993–2010)
- Sir Peter Smith (Selwyn), judge of the High Court of Justice of England and Wales
- Sydney Templeman, Baron Templeman (St. John's College), one of the Lords of Appeal in Ordinary 1982–1994
- Roger Toulson, Lord Toulson (Jesus), justice of the Supreme Court of the United Kingdom (2013–2016)
- Sir Colman Treacy (Jesus), judge of the Court of Appeal of England and Wales (2012–2018)
- Robert Walker, Baron Walker of Gestingthorpe (Trinity College), one of the Lords of Appeal in Ordinary (2002–2009); one of the first justices of the Supreme Court of the United Kingdom (2009–2013)
- Evan Wallach (Hughes Hall), judge of the United States Court of Appeals for the Federal Circuit, former judge of the United States Court of International Trade
- Wee Chong Jin (St John's), first chief justice of the Republic of Singapore (1963–1990)
- Wong Yan Lung (Magdalene), secretary for justice of Hong Kong
- Walter Woon (St John's), attorney-general of Singapore (2008–2010)
- Yong Pung How (Downing), chief justice of Singapore (1990–2006)

=== Legal academics ===
- Gary Chartier (Queens'), US anarchist legal theorist
- John Langbein (Trinity Hall), legal historian
- Lawrence Lessig (Trinity), US cyberlaw expert, founder of the Creative Commons movement, free software advocate

== Journalists and media personalities ==
- J. R. Ackerley (Magdalene)
- Clive Anderson (Selwyn)
- Alistair Appleton (Gonville and Caius)
- Neal Ascherson (King's)
- Anushka Asthana (St John's)
- Sir David Attenborough (Clare)
- Baroness Joan Bakewell (Newnham)
- Thorold Barker (Trinity)
- Martin Bell (King's)
- Jasmine Birtles (Christ's)
- Chris Blackhurst (Trinity Hall)
- Christopher Booker (Corpus Christi)
- Bill Buford (King's)
- John F. Burns (King's), Pulitzer Prize winner
- Sir Humphrey Burton (Fitzwilliam), Emmy Award winner
- Caroline Calloway (St Edmund's)
- Pat Chapman (Fitzwilliam)
- Philip Collins (St John's)
- Ted Conover (unknown)
- Alistair Cooke (Jesus)
- Geoffrey Crowther (Clare)
- Tim Davie (Selwyn)
- Tamasin Day-Lewis (King's)
- Alain de Botton (Caius)
- Katie Derham (Magdalene)
- Rick Edwards (Pembroke)
- Larry Elliott (Fitzwilliam)
- Julie Etchingham (Newnham)
- Vanessa Feltz (Trinity)
- James Forsyth (Jesus)
- Sir David Frost (Caius)
- Stephen Fry (Queens')
- Jonathan Galassi (Christ's)
- James K. Galbraith (King's)
- George Gale (Peterhouse)
- Bamber Gascoigne (Magdalene)
- Dermot Gleeson (Fitzwilliam)
- Arnab Goswami (Sidney Sussex)
- Andrew Gowers (Caius)
- Damian Grammaticas (Corpus Christi)
- Germaine Greer (Newnham)
- James Harding (Trinity)
- Johann Hari (King's)
- Simon Hoggart (King's)
- Charlotte Hudson (Fitzwilliam)
- Arianna Huffington (Girton)
- Konnie Huq (Robinson)
- Faisal Islam (Trinity)
- Clive James (Pembroke)
- Sarah Jarvis (unknown)
- Ciaran Jenkins (Fitzwilliam)
- Gareth Jones (Trinity)
- Spencer Kelly (unknown)
- Lewis H. Lapham (Magdalene)
- Walter Layton (Trinity)
- Emily Maitlis (Queens')
- Andrew Marr (Trinity Hall)
- Kingsley Martin (Magdalene)
- Kevin McCloud (Corpus Christi)
- John McPhee (unknown), Pulitzer Prize winner
- Baron Charles Moore (Trinity)
- Malcolm Muggeridge (Selwyn)
- Iain Overton (Downing/Caius)
- Jeremy Paxman (St Catharine's)
- George Plimpton (King's)
- Norman Podhoretz (Clare)
- Amol Rajan (Downing)
- Andrew Rawnsley (Sidney Sussex)
- Dan Roan (Fitzwilliam)
- Alan Rusbridger (Magdalene)
- Jenni Russell (St Catharine's)
- Roxana Saberi (Hughes Hall)
- Stephen Sackur (Emmanuel)
- John Simpson (Magdalene)
- Tim Stanley (Trinity)
- Allegra Stratton (Emmanuel)
- Zoe Strimpel (Jesus/Wolfson)
- Karan Thapar (Pembroke)
- Noel Thompson (St Catharine's)
- Peter Utley (Corpus Christi)
- Carol Vorderman (Sidney Sussex)
- Sid Waddell (St John's)
- Alan Watkins (Queens')
- Colin Welch (Peterhouse)
- Richard Whiteley (Christ's)
- Claudia Winkleman (New Hall)
- Sir Peregrine Worsthorne (Peterhouse)

== Sportspeople ==
=== Olympians ===
- Harold Abrahams (Caius), Olympian gold medallist, sprinter, long jumper
- David Cecil, 6th Marquess of Exeter (Magdalene), Olympian gold medallist, hurdler
- Stephanie Cook (Peterhouse), Olympic pentathlon gold medalist
- James Cracknell (Peterhouse), double Olympic gold medallist
- Deng Yaping (Jesus), Olympic gold medalist and world champion
- Billy Fiske (Trinity Hall), youngest US Olympic gold medalist, bobsleigh
- Syed Mohammad Hadi (Peterhouse), multi-talented India international
- Peter Jacobs, Olympic fencer
- Tom James (Trinity Hall), two-time Olympic gold medallist (2008, 2012)
- Paul Klenerman, Olympic sabre fencer
- George Nash (St Catharine's), British Olympic bronze medallist (2012)
- Philip Noel-Baker, Baron Noel-Baker (King's), Nobel Prize winner, runner
- Emma Pooley (Trinity Hall), Olympic silver medal (2008), world time trial champion (2010)
- John Pritchard (Robinson), British Olympic silver medallist (1980)
- Tom Ransley (Hughes Hall), world champion and Olympic bronze medallist (2012)
- Sidney Swann (Trinity Hall), Olympic gold medallist (1912)
- Annabel Vernon (Downing), Olympic silver medallist (2008)
- Anna Watkins (Newnham), Olympic gold medallist (2012)
- Josh West (Caius), British-American Olympic silver medallist (2008)
- Kieran West (Christ's/Pembroke), Olympic gold medallist (2000)
- Sarah Winckless (Fitzwilliam), world champion and Olympic bronze medallist (2004)

=== Backgammon ===
- Zoe Cunningham, 2010 Ladies World Backgammon Champion and business executive

=== Bridge ===
- Sandra Landy (1938–2017), international player for England and for Great Britain; world champion 1981
- Tom Townsend, Britain and England international and writer

=== Cricketers ===
- Sir George "Gubby" Allen (Trinity), England captain (1936–1948)
- Mike Atherton (Downing), England captain (1993–1998), led England in a record 54 Test matches
- Giles Baring (Magdalene), first class (1930–1946)
- Mark Bott, first class (2007–)
- Mike Brearley (St John's), England captain (1977–1981)
- Antony Roy Clark (Downing), first class (1981)
- John Crawley (Trinity), England international (1994–1999)
- Percy de Paravicini (Trinity), first class (1882–1911)
- Ted Dexter (Jesus), England captain (1961–1964)
- Phil Edmonds (Fitzwilliam), England international (1975–1987)
- Tony Lewis (Christ's), England and Glamorgan cricket captain (1955–1974)
- Alfred Lyttelton (Trinity), first man to play both cricket and football for England
- Peter May (Pembroke), England international (1951–1961)
- Derek Pringle (Fitzwilliam), England international (1983–1993)
- Ranjitsinhji Vibhaji II (Trinity), first Indian player to play for England (1893–1894)

=== Footballers ===
- Percy de Paravicini (Trinity), England international (1883–1884)
- Arthur Dunn (King's), England international (1883–1892)
- Alfred Lyttelton (Trinity), first man to play both cricket and football for England
- Steve Palmer (Christ's), English Premier League footballer, most notably at Ipswich Town F.C. (1989–2006)
- William Leslie Poole (Cavendish), "father of Uruguayan football"
- John Veitch (unknown), England international (1894)

=== Mountaineers ===
- E. S. Kennedy (Caius)
- George Mallory (Magdalene)
- Geoffrey Winthrop Young (Trinity)

=== Racing drivers ===
- Oliver Turvey (Fitzwilliam), GP2 driver (2010–)

=== Racehorse trainers ===
- John Gosden (Emmanuel)

=== Rowers ===
- Milan Bruncvík (Peterhouse), Czech Olympian
- Sir Adrian Cadbury (King's), 1952 Olympian and former chairman of Cadbury plc
- Rebecca Dowbiggin (Emmanuel), British cox
- David Jennens (Clare), European Champion and Olympian (1952)
- Shane O'Mara (Hughes Hall), American rower
- Alistair Potts (Trinity Hall), world champion cox

=== Rugby footballers ===
- Rob Andrew (St John's), England international (1985–1997)
- Eddie Butler (Fitzwilliam), Wales international (1980–1984)
- Mike Gibson (Queens'), Ireland international (1964–1979)
- Gavin Hastings (Magdalene), Scotland international (1986–1995)
- Damian Hopley (Hughes Hall), England international (1993, 1995)
- Logie Bruce Lockhart (St John's), Scotland international (1948–1953)
- Liam Mooney (Hughes Hall), Ireland international (1996–2000)
- Eric Peters (Hughes Hall), Scotland international (1995–1999)
- Martin Purdy (Fitzwilliam), club level (2003–2013)
- Andy Ripley (Hughes Hall), England international (1972–1976)
- Mark Robinson (Hughes Hall), New Zealand international (2000–2002)
- Ken Scotland (Trinity), Scotland international (1957–1965)
- Chris Sheasby (Hughes Hall), England international (1993, 1996–1997)
- Tony Underwood (St Edmund's), England international (1992–1998)
- Dan Vickerman (Hughes Hall), Australia international (2002–2008)
- Wavell Wakefield (Pembroke), England international (1920–1927)

=== Sports administrators ===
- John Veitch (unknown), president of Marylebone Cricket Club (1898)

== Explorers ==
- William John Bankes (Trinity), responsible for amassing the largest personal collection of Egyptian artifacts, at the family home Kingston Lacy
- Julius Brenchley (unknown), pre-eminent adventurer of the Victorian era
- John Brereton (Caius), chronicler of the first European exploration of Cape Cod and its environs
- Johann Ludwig Burckhardt (unknown), responsible for rediscovering the ancient ruins of the city of Petra, lost for almost a millennium
- Sir Thomas Cavendish (Corpus Christi), first man to intentionally circumnavigate the globe
- Walter Butler Cheadle (Caius), explorer of Western Canada, namesake of Cheadle, Alberta
- Francis Fletcher (Pembroke), accompanied Sir Francis Drake on his circumnavigation of the world from 1577 to 1580 and kept a written account of it, claiming Elizabeth Island and New Albion for England
- Sir Vivian Fuchs (St John's), responsible for the first overland crossing of Antarctica
- Kenneth Gandar-Dower (Trinity), led the expedition to Mount Kenya in an attempt to capture the Marozi, piloted one of the first flights to India
- Bartholomew Gosnold (unknown), instrumental in founding the Virginia Company, and the Jamestown settlement, the first permanent English/British settlement in the Americas
- Thomas Hooker (Emmanuel), founder of the province of Connecticut and the settlement of Hartford
- George Mallory (Magdalene), possibly the first man to reach the summit of Mount Everest
- John Mason (Peterhouse), responsible for drawing up the first English map of Newfoundland and naming New Hampshire
- St. John Philby (Trinity), leading Arabist and explorer of the Middle East
- John Robinson (Corpus Christi), pastor of the Pilgrim Fathers
- William Wentworth (Peterhouse), co-leader of the team that made the first European crossing of the Blue Mountains in Australia, one of the first European settlers to articulate an Australian identity
- William Wentworth-FitzWilliam (Trinity), explorer of Western Canada, first "tourist" to travel through the Yellowhead Pass
- John Wheelwright (Sidney Sussex), early explorer of New Hampshire, founder of the settlement of Exeter
- Roger Williams (Pembroke), founder of Rhode Island, known for attempts to cooperate with Native Americans
- Edward Adrian Wilson (Gonville and Caius), died on the way to the South Pole with Robert Falcon Scott
- John Winthrop (Trinity), founder and first governor of Massachusetts

== See also ==
- List of chancellors of the University of Cambridge
- List of vice-chancellors of the University of Cambridge
- List of current heads of University of Cambridge colleges
