= Cantabrigian =

Member of the University of Cambridge or a resident of Cambridge, MA

Cantabrigian (often shortened to Cantab) is an adjective that is used in two meanings: 1) to refer to what is of or pertaining to the University of Cambridge, located in Cambridge, United Kingdom; or 2) to refer to what is of or pertaining to the city of Cambridge, Massachusetts, United States. The term is derived from Cantabrigia, a medieval Latin name for Cambridge invented on the basis of the Anglo-Saxon name Cantebrigge.

In Cambridge, United States, the name "Cantabrigia" appears in the city seal and (abbreviated to "Cantab") in the seal of the Episcopal Divinity School, located therein. The word Cantabrigia appears in the circular logo of the Cambridge Trust Company, a financial institution based in Cambridge, United States. A pub in Cambridge, United States, called the Cantab Lounge is a play on this abbreviation.

It is also the name of one of the Rugby clubs based in Cambridge, United Kingdom. Cantabrigian Rugby Club formerly The Old Cantabrigian RUFC, was established by the 'old boys' of local Hills Road Sixth Form College (formerly The Cambridgeshire High School for Boys, until 1974). Cantabrigian Rowing Club was similarly established, in 1950.

== See also ==
- The Tab, a student newspaper group originating in Cambridge, UK
- List of University of Cambridge people
