= Jodocus Crull =

Jodocus Crull, M.D., FRS (1660–1713) was a late 17th-century and early 18th-century "miscellaneous writer" on historical subjects, with political and sociological insights. Though his life remains somewhat of a mystery, his works are still consulted by academic and popular history writers today.

== Early life and education ==
Crull was born in Hamburg, then a free state of the Germanic Confederation, of a family part of that city's patriciate. He applied himself to medicine at Holland's Leiden University. The M.D. was attained in 1679 with Crull's inaugural essay: Disputatio medico-chymica exhibens medicamenti veterum universalis, recentiorumque particularium verum in medicinae usum, etc.

== Life in England ==
Subsequently, Crull settled in England although he may have been a public school student there before he matriculated at Leiden. He received his M.D. from King's College in the University of Cambridge on 7 August 1681 as a result of a royal mandate from Charles II on 7 August 1681. In the same year, he was elected a fellow of the Royal Society on 23 November and admitted on 30 November. He was later admitted a licentiate of the Royal College of Physicians on 22 December 1692.

Crull's life remains rather ambiguous, as some accounts speculate that he subsisted mainly by doing translations and compilations for booksellers while seeming to have met with little success in his profession since there are a number of omissions of his name on the annual list of the Fellows of the Royal Society which, according to the author (Gordon Goodwin) of the Crull entry in the 1917 D.N.B., suggest an inability to pay. Other accounts imply the likelihood that Crull may have been a dilettante and eccentric who had the means to follow his interests and who may not have paid his fees to the Royal Society with regularity since he may not have attached a great significance to being listed yearly. Where he practised medicine could have been in London or its environs for he settled in London but resided outside of the city because of "country" being appended to his name on the lists.

Crull entreated Sir Hans Sloane's vote at the coming election of a navy physician and was known to be in contact with Sir Isaac Newton and other prominent academics.

== Works ==
Crull's works were published either anonymously or with his initials only. His principal translations are:

- Baron von Pufendorf's Of the Nature and Qualification of Religion, in reference to civil society;
- Pufendorf's An Introduction to the History of the Principal Kingdoms and States of Europe;
- Gabriel Dellon's A Vovage to the East Indies, etc.;
- Father J. Bouvet's The Present Condition of the Muscovite Empire,...in two letters,...with the Life of the present Emperour of China.

Other writings include:

- A Compleat History of the Affairs of Spain;
- Memoirs of Denmark;
- The Antiquities of St. Peters, or the Abbey Church of Westminster;
- The History of the Jews since the Destruction of Jerusalem: being a continuation of Josephus;
- The Antient and Present State of Muscovy.

== See also ==
- List of University of Cambridge members
- Leiden University
