= Richard Henson (neurobiologist) =

Cognitive neuroscientist

Rik Henson
- Born: 1970 (age 55–56)
- Education: University of Cambridge, University of Edinburgh
- Known for: Human memory, neuroimaging
- Awards: BPS Prize for Outstanding Doctoral Research; EPS Prize for Young Researcher; President British Neuroscience Association; Fellow of the British Academy
- Scientific career
- Workplaces: MRC Cognition & Brain Sciences Unit, University of Cambridge (2004 onwards) Institute of Cognitive Neuroscience, University College London (1997-2004)
- Thesis: Short-term memory for serial order (1997)
- Website: mrc-cbu.cam.ac.uk/people/rik.henson/personal

Richard "Rik" Henson, FBA (born 1970) is a British cognitive neuroscientist and academic. He is Professor of Cognitive Neuroscience at the University of Cambridge, where he works at the MRC Cognition and Brain Sciences Unit in Cambridge, England. He studies the neural bases of human memory. From 2021 to 2023, he is also President of the British Neuroscience Association.

In 2022, he was elected a Fellow of the British Academy (FBA), the United Kingdom's national academy for the humanities and social sciences.

== Publications ==
His most famous articles are:

- Henson, R.N. What can functional imaging tell the experimental psychologist? Quarterly Journal of Experimental Psychology, Section A. 2005 58, 193–233.
- Henson R.N. Neuroimaging studies of priming. Progress in Neurobiology. 2003 May 1;70(1):53-81.
- Henson, R.N., Shallice, T. & Dolan, R.J. Neuroimaging evidence for dissociable forms of repetition priming. Science. 2000, 287, 1269–1272.
- Henson R.N., Rugg M.D., Shallice T, Josephs O, Dolan R.J. Recollection and familiarity in recognition memory: an event-related functional magnetic resonance imaging study. The Journal of Neuroscience. 1999 May 15;19(10):3962-72.
- Henson R.N. Short-term memory for serial order: The start-end model. Cognitive Psychology. 1998 Jul 1;36(2):73-137.
