= James Wood (epidemiologist) =

Academic and epidemiologist

James Wood OBE, BVetMed, BSc, MSc, DipECVPH, PhD, DLSHTM, FRCVS
- Born: James Lionel Norman Wood
- Scientific career
- Fields: Veterinary epidemiology
- Website: www.vet.cam.ac.uk/staff/professor-james-wood-obe

James Wood OBE is an infectious disease and veterinary epidemiologist at the University of Cambridge. His work includes research in tuberculosis in cattle, emerging infectious diseases, antibiotic resistance, influenza, lyssavirus, filovirus, henipavirus, and rabies.

== Career ==
He was awarded an OBE in 2021 for services to veterinary science. He is in charge of the FluMap consortium led by the Animal and Plant Health Agency.

== Selected publications ==
- Grenfell, Bryan T.; Pybus, Oliver G.; Gog, Julia R.; Wood, James L. N.; Daly, Janet M.; Mumford, Jenny A.; Holmes, Edward C. (16 January 2004). "Unifying the Epidemiological and Evolutionary Dynamics of Pathogens". Science. 303 (5656): 327–332. Bibcode:2004Sci...303..327G. doi:10.1126/science.1090727. ISSN 0036-8075. PMID 14726583. (Co-author)
- Mutreja, Ankur; Kim, Dong Wook; Thomson, Nicholas R.; Connor, Thomas R.; Lee, Je Hee; Kariuki, Samuel; Croucher, Nicholas J.; Choi, Seon Young; Harris, Simon R.; Lebens, Michael; Niyogi, Swapan Kumar; Kim, Eun Jin; Ramamurthy, T.; Chun, Jongsik; Wood, James L. N.; Clemens, John D.; Czerkinsky, Cecil; Nair, G. Balakrish; Holmgren, Jan; Parkhill, Julian; Dougan, Gordon (September 2011). "Evidence for several waves of global transmission in the seventh cholera pandemic". Nature. 477 (7365): 462–465. Bibcode:2011Natur.477..462M. doi:10.1038/nature10392. ISSN 1476-4687. PMC 3736323. PMID 21866102. (Co-author)
- Luis, Angela D.; Hayman, David T. S.; O'Shea, Thomas J.; Cryan, Paul M.; Gilbert, Amy T.; Pulliam, Juliet R. C.; Mills, James N.; Timonin, Mary E.; Willis, Craig K. R.; Cunningham, Andrew A.; Fooks, Anthony R.; Rupprecht, Charles E.; Wood, James L. N.; Webb, Colleen T. (7 April 2013). "A comparison of bats and rodents as reservoirs of zoonotic viruses: are bats special?". Proceedings of the Royal Society B: Biological Sciences. 280 (1756) 20122753. doi:10.1098/rspb.2012.2753. ISSN 0962-8452. PMC 3574368. PMID 23378666. (Co-author)
- Fromsa, Abebe; Willgert, Katriina; Srinivasan, Sreenidhi; Mekonnen, Getnet; Bedada, Wegene; Gumi, Balako; Lakew, Matios; Tadesse, Biniam; Bayissa, Berecha; Sirak, Asegedech; Girma Abdela, Musse; Gebre, Solomon; Chibssa, Tesfaye; Veerasami, Maroudam; Vordermeier, H. Martin; Bakker, Douwe; Berg, Stefan; Ameni, Gobena; Juleff, Nick; De Jong, Mart C. M.; Wood, James; Conlan, Andrew; Kapur, Vivek (29 March 2024). "BCG vaccination reduces bovine tuberculosis transmission, improving prospects for elimination". Science. 383 (6690) eadl3962. Bibcode:2024Sci...383L3962F. doi:10.1126/science.adl3962. ISSN 0036-8075. PMID 38547287. (Co-author)
