= Tristan Bekinschtein =

Argentine researcher (born 1975)

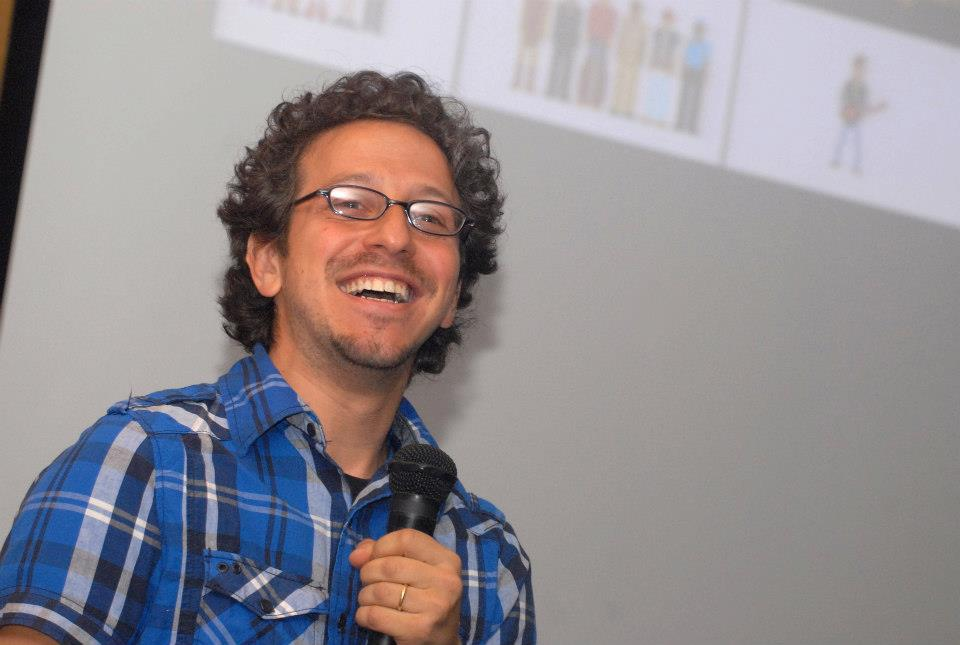
- Born: 1975 (age 50–51); Buenos Aires, Argentina
- Education: Buenos Aires University
- Known for: Physiology and Cognition of Consciousness, Auditory Processing
- Children: 2
- Awards: Turing Institute Fellowship, Wellcome Trust Fellowship
- Scientific career
- Fields: Cognitive Neuroscience, Theoretical Neuroscience
- Workplaces: Cambridge University
- Doctoral advisor: Facundo Manes, Adrian Owen

Tristan Bekinschtein is an Anglo-Argentinean biologist, Master in Neurophysiology and PhD in neuroscience, Buenos Aires University. He is a university professor and Turing Fellow at Cambridge University. Bekinschtein is primarily known for his work on variable states of consciousness and auditory feedback. He presently runs the Consciousness and Cognition Laboratory at Cambridge University.

== Biography ==
Bekinschtein began his scientific career as a neuroimaging analyst at the Raul Carrea Institute in 1999. In 2005, he joined the Impaired Consciousness Group at the University of Cambridge as a research fellow. He became an Assistant Researcher at the Institute of Cognitive Neurology in Argentina in 2006, before joining the INSERM-CEA Cognitive Neuroimaging Unit (UNICOG) at the French Institute of Health and Medical Research in Paris. In 2008, he joined the MRC-Cognition and Brain Sciences Unit at Cambridge University as a research fellow. In 2012, he gave a TED Talk on consciousness at Rio De La Plata.

As of 2011, Bekinschtein runs the Consciousness and Cognition Laboratory at Cambridge University.

== Select publications ==
Bekinschtein has more than 150 publications in renowned peer-reviewed publications. Below is a selection:

- "Neural signature of the conscious processing of auditory regularities" TA Bekinschtein, S Dehaene, B Rohaut, F Tadel, L Cohen, L Naccache. Proceedings of the National Academy of Sciences 106 (5), 1672–1677. This article is about how attention and consciousness modulates the detection of auditory information.
- "Classical conditioning in the vegetative and minimally conscious state" TA Bekinschtein, DE Shalom, C Forcato, M Herrera, MR Coleman. Nature Neuroscience 12 (10), 1343–1349. This article is about how simple learning capacity can detect consciousness in patients and its prognosis.
- "Brain connectivity dissociates responsiveness from drug exposure during propofol-induced transitions of consciousness" S Chennu, S O’Connor, R Adapa, DK Menon, TA Bekinschtein. PLoS Computational Biology 12 (1), e1004669. In this article, the authors used brain signals to predict the amount of drug in blood and if a person can respond or has lost consciousness.
- "Inducing task-relevant responses to speech in the sleeping brain" S Kouider, T Andrillon, LS Barbosa, L Goupil, TA Bekinschtein. Current Biology 24 (18), 2208–2214. In this article, the authors showed that there are brain signatures of intention to act during sleep.
- "Losing the left side of the world: rightward shift in human spatial attention with sleep onset" CA Bareham, T Manly, OV Pustovaya, SK Scott, TA Bekinschtein. Scientific reports 4 (1), 1–5. In this article, the authors showed that normal people behave like patients with brain lesions when getting drowsy.
- "Preserved sensory processing but hampered conflict detection when stimulus input is task-irrelevant" SA Nuiten, A Canales-Johnson, L Beerendonk, N Nanuashvili,... . Elife 10, e64431. In this article, the authors showed the degree of involvement of attention and relevance of stimuli to resolve a conflict cognitive control task.
- "Decreasing alertness modulates perceptual decision-making" SR Jagannathan, CA Bareham, TA Bekinschtein. Journal of Neuroscience 42 (3), 454–473. This study shows possible mechanisms of brain reconfiguration of decision making triggered by waning wakefulness.
- "Decreased alertness reconfigures cognitive control networks" A Canales-Johnson, L Beerendonk, S Blain, S Kitaoka, ... . Journal of Neuroscience 40 (37), 7142–7154. This study shows that people can still resolve conflicts when drowsy but they use different brain networks.
- "Dissociable neural information dynamics of perceptual integration and differentiation during bistable perception" A Canales-Johnson, AJ Billig, F Olivares, A Gonzalez, MC Garcia, W Silva, ... . Cerebral Cortex 30 (8), 4563–4580. This study showed that different brain signatures for different ways of perceiving the same sounds, it is the internal world that defines what we hear.
- "Different underlying mechanisms for high and low arousal in probabilistic learning in humans" LF Ciria, M Suárez-Pinilla, AG Williams, SR Jagannathan, D Sanabria, ... TA Bekinschtein. Cortex 143, 180–194. In this article the authors outline the relationship between arousal and cognitive flexibility that leads to the understanding of the underlying mechanisms of cognition when challenged by internal homeostatic changes.
