= Thorold Barker =

British journalist

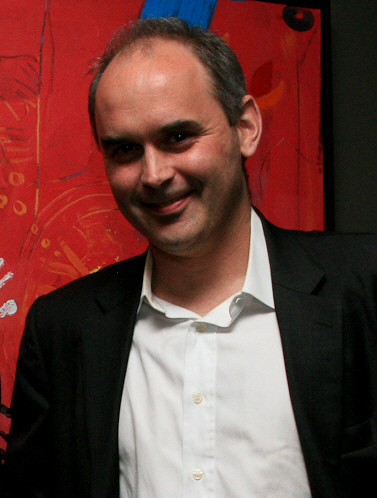
- Born: 14 August 1971 (age 55)
- Education: Trinity College, Cambridge
- Occupation: Journalist
- Spouse: Jennifer Anderson

Thorold Philip Walter Barker (born 14 August 1971) is a British financial journalist and author who was based in New York City before assuming the editorship of the European edition of the Wall Street Journal in March 2013.

Barker graduated from Trinity College, Cambridge. His work first gained international recognition in 2004 when he became editor of the popular and influential Lex page of the New York bureau of the Financial Times. His work included investigative pieces on Wall Street, as well as travel writing on his trips to Africa and Antarctica.

In June 2008, Barker moved to the Wall Street Journal to take over its 'Heard on the Street' page.
