= Rod McAllister =

British architect and filmmaker

Rod McAllister RIBA FRSA
- Education: Girton College, Cambridge
- Occupations: Architect and Film-maker

Roderick Iain McAllister is a British architect and film-maker.

McAllister read architecture at Girton College, Cambridge and University of Liverpool Schools of Architecture. He was a founding partner of King McAllister with Dave King, Liverpool; principal of McAllister Co and McAllister ADF, London; lecturer at Liverpool School of Architecture and visiting professor at University of Rome La Sapienza and was a partner of Sheppard Robson, London 2003–14.

== Notable works ==
- Masterplan of University of Perpignan, France
  (International Union of Architects Jeune Architects Grand Prix)

Architects Dave King & Rod McAllister/King McAllister:

- Liverpool School of Architecture, New Studios and Galleries
  (Royal Institute of British Architects Award)
- Student Services Centre, University of Liverpool
  (Royal Institute of British Architects Award)

McAllister Co/ADF:

- Mellangoose, Falmouth, Cornwall
  (Royal Institute of British Architects Award)
- Battersea Park Boat House, London
  (Building of the Year Award, Royal Fine Art Commission Trust)
- Battersea Park Pump House, London
  (Civic Trust Commendation)
- Tawny House, Bath

Sheppard Robson:

- The Small Animal Teaching Hospital at the University of Liverpool School of Veterinary Science.
  (Royal Institute of British Architects Award 2008, Civic Trust Award 2008 )
- The Active Learning Labs, University of Liverpool Department of Engineering, completed 2009
- London Business School Sammy Ofer Centre, completed 2016
- Nelson Mandela Children's Hospital, Johannesburg, 2009 with John Cooper Architecture (London), GAPP Architects & Urban Designers and Ruben Reddy Architects(Johannesburg)
  (South African Institute of Architects Award of Merit 2018)

McAllister has produced and presented short documentary films about universities and architecture.
