= Johan Bäverbrant =

Swedish diplomat

Johan Bäverbrant (born 19 March 1968 in Stockholm, Sweden) is a Swedish diplomat.

Bäverbrant is known for his work against homelessness and participation in the trafficking debate. In 2006, he gathered more than seven thousand signatures against trafficking during the World Cup. He has a Master of Laws degree from the University of Cambridge. In 1996 he received the award of the Swedish King, Carl XVI Gustaf, for his work with the Council of Europe. Bäverbrant is married and has three children. Once a renowned ice hockey player he is now a diplomat living in Sweden.

== References and notes ==
- Signatures Stop Trafficking
- Interview p. 5
- Swedish Homelessness - Aftonbladet
- WTO Panelist
