= Shahid Aziz Siddiqi =

Pakistani bureaucrat

Shahid Aziz Siddiqi (Urdu: شاہد عزیز صدیقی) (born 26 January 1945 – 7 November 2019 in Lucknow, India) was a Pakistani bureaucrat who served as chairman of State Life Insurance and of National Highway Authority. He also remained the Vice Chancellor of the Ziauddin Medical University. Siddiqui held a post graduate degree in Development Economics from the University of Cambridge, UK.

== Education ==
Siddiqi was educated at the Pakistan Air Force Military Academy in Sargodha and received a Bachelor's degree from F.C College in Lahore, a Master's degrees from the University of Karachi and the University of Cambridge.

In 1968, after a stint as a recon pilot in the Pakistan Air Force and a year as a Management Trainee for the Pakistan Tobacco Company, Siddiqi sat his Central Superior Services of Pakistan (CSS) examinations for the elite Pakistan Civil Services and topped the examination in West and East Pakistan (now Bangladesh) joining the District Management Group, now called the Pakistan Administrative Service.

== Government career ==
In 1982, Siddiqi began serving as a Minister Hajj in Saudi Arabia, where he was appointed Commissioner of Karachi. He then served in several roles, including Managing Director of the Rice Export Committee of Pakistan, Director General Ports and Shipping, Chairman National Highway Authority and Chairman State Life Insurance Corporation. He worked with Prime Minister Benazir Bhutto, a relationship he characterized as close and courteous in his tribute to her after her death.

=== Post-government career ===
Siddiqi served as Executive Director of the Indus Valley Institute of Art and Architecture in Karachi before becoming Vice Chancellor of Ziauddin Medical University. He also serves as the President of the Sindh and Balochistan Chapter of the British Alumni Association.
