= Helen Sneddon =

British chemist

Helen Fiona Sneddon
- Education: University of Cambridge
- Scientific career
- Workplaces: GlaxoSmithKline Pharmaceuticals; University of California, Irvine; University of York
- Thesis: The application of [beta-keto dithianes in natural product synthesis] (2005)
- Doctoral advisor: Steven V. Ley

Helen Sneddon is a British chemist who is Professor of Sustainable Chemistry and Director of the Green Chemistry Centre of Excellence at the University of York. Her research looks to identify sustainable synthetic strategies, including alternatives to carbon-halogen bonds and ways to make chemical products more robust.

== Early life and education ==
Sneddon was an undergraduate student at the University of Cambridge, where she worked alongside Steven V. Ley. After earning her doctorate, Sneddon was supported by a Royal Commission for the Exhibition of 1851 fellowship to move to the University of California, Irvine, where she worked on asymmetric synthesis of palladium(II) compounds.

== Research and career ==
Sneddon spent most of her career at GlaxoSmithKline Pharmaceuticals, where she first worked in medicinal chemistry. She became interested in sustainable processes and expanding their "green" chemistry activity. She established the Green Chemistry group at GSK, which she has led since 2011. During this campaign she reduced the use of chlorinated solvents at GSK by >50%, which involved advocacy, education and investigations into the properties of replacement solvents. She devised new strategies to improve sustainability in the design of new drugs, including finding a replacement for toxic reaction media and reagents.

Sneddon was made Director of the Green Chemistry Centre of Excellence at the University of York in 2022. In 2024, she helped to establish the Doctoral Training Centre focussed on Chemical Synthesis for a Healthy Planet.

== Selected publications ==
- Marco T. Sabatini; Lee. T. Boulton; Helen F. Sneddon; Tom D. Sheppard (14 January 2019). "A green chemistry perspective on catalytic amide bond formation". Nature Catalysis. 2 (1): 10–17. doi:10.1038/s41929-018-0211-5. ISSN 2520-1158. Wikidata Q128638315.
- Catherine M. Alder; John D. Hayler; Richard K. Henderson; Anikó M. Redman; Lena Shukla; Leanna E. Shuster; Helen F. Sneddon (2016). "Updating and further expanding GSK's solvent sustainability guide". Green Chemistry. 18 (13): 3879–3890. doi:10.1039/c6gc00611f. ISSN 1463-9262. Wikidata Q64112560.
- Laura H S Smith; Susannah C. Coote; Helen F Sneddon; David J Procter (1 August 2010). "Beyond the Pummerer reaction: recent developments in thionium ion chemistry". Angewandte Chemie International Edition. 49 (34): 5832–5844. doi:10.1002/anie.201000517. ISSN 1433-7851. PMID 20583014. Wikidata Q34123047.
