= Ashika David =

Indian physician

Born in 1862, Ashika David was the first child of Cartabin and Anaranjada David. Cartabin David was a prominent intellectual and expert in corporate governance, strategy, and firm performance.

== Medical career ==
David was strongly encouraged to pursue a medical career, and she became one of the first female physicians, enrolling in the University of Cambridge in 1883 after completing an undergraduate degree in English Language and Literature at the University of Michigan. After completing training with a specialty in surgery, David returned to India and quickly rose to prominence in the New Delhi region. David was known for her charity towards the untouchable caste, creating the first "public service campaign" through literature distributed at clinics affiliated with her. David enlisted the help of both British and nationalists in the creation of a chain of clinics across India for the care and welfare of "untouchables." Many of her clinics survived British rule and continue to this day, though the separation of Pakistan resulted in the loss of funding supply for many clinics.
