= Onyeche Tifase =

Nigerian business executive

- Education: University of Nottingham; University of Cambridge
- Occupation: Business Executive
- Years active: 2001–present
- Employer: Siemens Nigeria

Onyeche Tifase is the Managing Director and Chief Executive Officer of Siemens Nigeria, a position she assumed in 2014. She is the first Nigerian to hold that position. She is also Vice Chairman of the Nigerian Economic Summit Group. She is the President of the Nigerian-German Chamber of Commerce.

== Early life ==
Tifase grew up in the Ogun State of Nigeria. Her mother was a chemistry teacher and her father was a general manager at a cement company. Tifase graduated with a bachelor's degree, honours, in electronics engineering from the University of Nottingham in 1999. In 2001, she completed her master's degree in Electrical Engineering from the University of Cambridge.

== Career ==
=== Siemens ===
Tifase started her career with Siemens in 2001 as an Electrical engineer in the Power Distribution Division of Siemens UK and thereafter moved to other roles in power transmission & distribution, sales and marketing divisions in Siemens Germany and Siemens USA. She came back to Nigeria in 2006 and worked with Accenture Nigeria in the area of management consulting up till 2009 before returning to Siemens as Deputy General Manager, Medium Voltage and Transformers for Siemens Ltd Nigeria. She became the first Nigerian Managing Director & Chief Executive Officer of Siemens Nigeria effective November 1, 2014.

=== Nigerian Economic Summit Group ===
Tifase is a Vice-Chairman of the Nigerian Economic Summit Group (NESG) and was appointed to the position in 2018 alongside Niyi Yusuf. She was previously a Non-Executive Director of the company.

=== Nigerian-German Chamber of Commerce ===
In July 2019, Tifase was appointed President of the Nigerian-German Chamber of Commerce (NGCC). Tifase's appointment coincided with the renaming and rebranding of the association; previously the NGCC was known as the Nigerian-German Business Association. Tifase succeeded Folabi Esan and is the NGCC's first female president.

== Personal life ==
Onyeche lives in Lagos, Nigeria. She is married with three children.
