= Hilary Cremin =

British academic

- Born: Hilary Joy Cremin
- Education: University of Warwick; Wolfson College, Oxford; University of Leicester
- Occupation: Academic
- Employer: University of Cambridge

Hilary Joy Cremin is a British academic who is a senior professor at the University of Cambridge and head of the Faculty of Education. She was replaced by Clare Brooks in October 2026. She researches, writes and teaches about peace education and conflict transformation in schools and communities.

== Early life ==
Cremin earned a BA in French and European literature from the University of Warwick, a PGCE from Wolfson College, Oxford, and a PhD from the University of Leicester.

== Career ==
She was an academic at Oxford Brookes University, followed by the University of Leicester School of Education where she was director of research, then joining the University of Cambridge in October 2008 as an associate professor. Cremin was later appointed head of the Faculty of Education at Cambridge, in which function she oversaw the hiring of Jason Arday, whom she described as "the best in the world in terms of the research that you do."

== Selected publications ==
- Vincett, Karen; Cremin, Hilary; Thomas, Gary (2005). Teachers And Assistants Working Together. McGraw-Hill Education.
- Cremin, Hilary (2007). Peer Mediation: Citizenship and Social Inclusion Revisited. McGraw-Hill Education.
- Cremin, Hilary; Bevington, Terence (2017). Positive Peace in Schools: Tackling Conflict and Creating a Culture of Peace in the Classroom. Routledge. ISBN 9781138235649.
- Cremin, Hilary (2026). Rewilding Education: Rethinking the Place of Schools Now and in the Future. Routledge. ISBN 9781041043157.
- Stacey, Hilary; Robinson, Pat (1997). Let's Mediate: A Teachers' Guide to Peer Support and Conflict Resolution Skills for all Ages. SAGE Publications.
