= John Naughton =

Irish academic

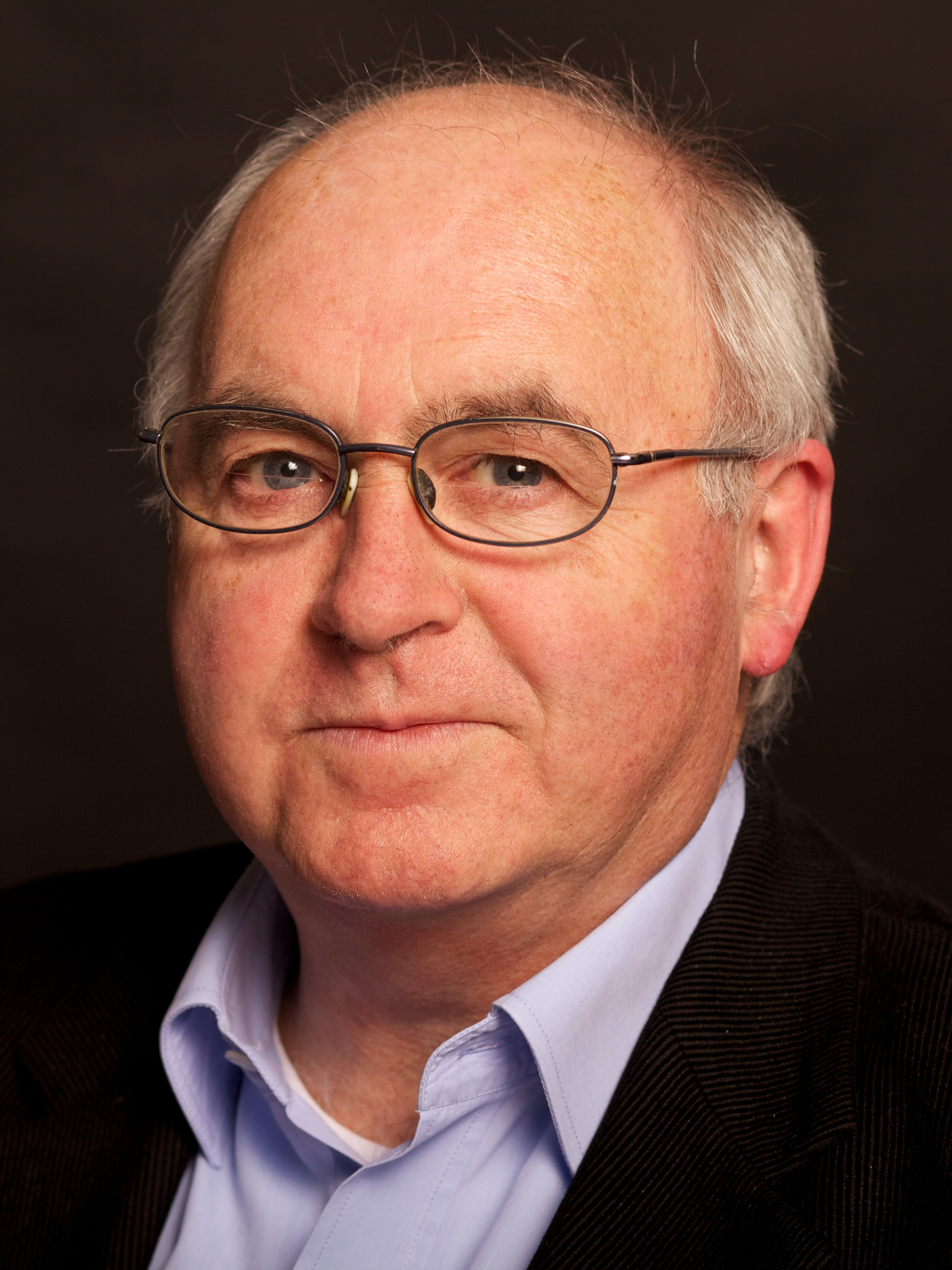
- Naughton in 2011
- Born: July 18, 1946 (age 79); Ballina, County Mayo, Ireland
- Occupations: Academic; Journalist; Author

John Naughton (born 18 July 1946) is an Irish academic, journalist and author. He is a senior research fellow in the Centre for Research in the Arts, Social Sciences, and Humanities at Cambridge University, director of the Press Fellowship Programme at Wolfson College, Cambridge, emeritus professor of the public understanding of technology at the British Open University, adjunct professor at University College, Cork and the technology columnist of the London Observer newspaper.

== Personal background ==
John Naughton was born in 1946 in Ballina, County Mayo. He was educated at University College, Cork, and at Emmanuel College, Cambridge. He now lives and works in Cambridge.

== Intellectual background ==
Starting as an electrical engineer who worked in systems modelling and analysis, Naughton subsequently developed an interest in the public understanding of technology and—later—in the social, political, and cultural impact of internet technology.

== Academic career ==
=== The Open University ===
Naughton joined the Open University as a lecturer in systems in 1972. He has made contributions (see e.g.) to the understanding and application of soft systems analysis developed by Peter Checkland at Lancaster University.

In addition to his work in systems analysis, Naughton also made significant contributions to the public understanding of technology, initially as co-designer (with Professor Nigel Cross) of two incarnations of the university's Technology Foundation Course (T101 & T102) which, over its lifetime, introduced over 50,000 students to technological ideas. In the 1980s he was a key member of the team that introduced the use of personal computers into the university's teaching and learning system. In the 1990s, with colleagues Martin Weller and Garry Alexander, Naughton created the university's first major online course (You, your computer and the Net) which attracted 12,000 students per presentation in its early days and marked the beginning of the university's rise as a major provider of online education. (It now has approximately 250,000 online students.)

In 2001 he set up the university's Relevant Knowledge programme—a suite of short online courses on topical technological issues and was director of the programme until 2009.

Naughton was promoted to senior lecturer in 1980 and became professor of the public understanding of technology in July 2002. He retired from the Open University in 2011 and was appointed emeritus professor.

=== Other academic activities ===
In 1991, Naughton was elected a Fellow of Wolfson College, Cambridge and in 1996 became director of the college's Press Fellowship Programme, which brings journalists in mid-career from all over the world to Cambridge for a term to research a project of their own supervision. To date, the Programme has welcomed over 310 journalists from 46 countries.

In 2008, he was appointed academic adviser to the Arcadia Project at Cambridge University Library. This was a project, sponsored by the Arcadia Fund, to explore the role of the academic library in a digital age. The project ran from 2008 to 2012 and supported 19 Arcadia Fellows and their associated projects.

He was vice-president of Wolfson College, Cambridge, from 2011 to 2015.

=== Current research ===
In collaboration with Professor Sir Richard Evans and Dr David Runciman, Naughton is a principal investigator on a five-year research project on 'Conspiracy and Democracy' funded by the Leverhulme Trust. He is also co-director (with Professor David Runciman) of the 'Technology and Democracy' project in the Cambridge Centre for Digital Knowledge. Both projects are based in CRASSH (the Centre for Research in the Arts, Social Sciences, and Humanities) at Cambridge University. Naughton is chair of the advisory board of Cambridge's Minderoo Centre for Technology and Democracy Naughton is also a member of the steering group of the university's Strategic Research Initiative on Big Data.

== Journalistic career ==
In the early 1970s, Naughton wrote for the political and cultural weekly, the New Statesman, mainly covering scientific issues.

Between 1982 and 1987 he was Television Critic of The Listener, a weekly magazine published by the BBC which ceased publication in 1991.

In 1987 he succeeded the novelist Julian Barnes as television critic of the London Observer, and held that post until mid-1995. During that time he won the 'Critic of the Year' award three times. He now writes the Observer's 'Networker' column.

== Other activities ==
Naughton is a regular keynote speaker, a blogger and a photographer.

== Recent publications ==
Naughton's most recent book is From Gutenberg to Zuckerberg: What You Really Need to Know About the Internet (Quercus Books, 2012).

An earlier book, A Brief History of the Future: Origins of the Internet, is an account of the history of the network.
