= Speranza Ndege =

- Occupations: educator, consultant, environmentalist, researcher
- Known for: founding the first higher education online programs in Kenya conducting research and trainings in higher education e-learning, distance learning and ICT facilitating the spread of online education in Africa

Academic background
- Education: Ghent University (Ph.D.); University of Sunderland (M.Sc.); University of Nairobi (M.A., B.Ed. Hons.)

Academic work
- Discipline: higher education e-learning, distance learning
- Institutions: University of Embu

Speranza Ndege is a Kenyan educator, environmentalist, trainer and consultant who currently serves a senior lecturer and director of the Institute of Open, Distance and e-Learning (ODeL) at the University of Embu. She is known for her work in higher education e-learning, distance learning and information and communications technology (ICT). Her work includes founding the first higher education online programs in Kenya. Ndege's work has subsequently impacted the development of e-learning higher education throughout East Africa.

Ndege has authored or co-authored more than 20 publications and spoken at dozens of international meetings, workshops and conferences.

== Education ==
Ndege received an honors bachelor's degree in education in 1984 and a master's degree in literature in 1990 from the University of Nairobi. She received a Ph.D. from Ghent University's Department of African Languages and Cultures in 2002. In 2007, Ndege received a master's degree in computer based information systems from the University of Sunderland.

== Career ==
Since 2020, Ndege has held positions at the University of Embu as a senior lecturer and director of the Institute of ODeL. She is also a fellow of Advance HE.

From 2003 to 2019, Ndege held positions as an educator, director and founder at Kenyatta University (KU). In 2003, she collaborated with Royal Melbourne University of Technology and Curtin University to co-found Kenya's first higher education online programs through KU's African Virtual University Learning Centre. KU's first diploma and degree programs in computer science and business administration and management were piloted during Ndege's three years as program director. She served as the director of KU's e-Learning Coordinating Centre from 2007 to 2008. Ndege also founded KU's first television station and served as director of KU's Television and Radio Services from 2014 to 2017. For the next three years, she was a digital programs mentor in KU's Department of Literature.

Ndege's work in higher education has additionally involved supervising post graduate students; developing higher education policies, strategic plans and programs; training students and faculty in online learning; reviewing conference proposals for eLearning Africa and evaluating Kenyan higher education programs and facilities for e-readiness. Her work in consulting includes environmental audits as a Royal Associates consulting engineer for Kenyan clients.

Ndege's research, projects and affiliations have involved mitigating barriers to education in African countries and the inclusion of ICT in their classrooms. In 2007, Moodle was introduced to Kenya via KU. That same year, Ndege was appointed to the second e-Learning Africa planning committee by Kenya's Ministry of Education, Science and Technology. The conference facilitated e-Learning development throughout East Africa, as the utilization of Moodle has since expanded throughout the region. From 2010 through 2018, Ndege served as a commissioner of the Broadband Commission for Sustainable Development. Through her appointment as a Technical and Planning Committee member, Ndege has supported the establishment of the National Open University of Kenya. She is also a Distance Education for Africa board member.

== Publications ==
- Networking & Data Communication in an Institution of Higher Learning (2016)
- ORELT Open Resources for English Language Teaching: Module 3 - Success in Reading, Vancouver, Canada, Common Wealth of Learning (2012)
