= Deborah Prentice =

American scholar of psychology (born 1961)

Vice Chancellor of the University of Cambridge
- Incumbent
- Assumed office July 1, 2023
- Preceded by: Anthony Freeling (acting)

Provost of Princeton University
- In office July 1, 2017 – March 13, 2023
- Preceded by: David Lee
- Succeeded by: Jennifer Rexford

Personal details
- Born: Debroah A. Prentice; November 1961 (age 64) Oakland, California, U.S.
- Spouse: Jeremy Adelman
- Children: 3
- Parent: Barbara Prentice (mother)
- Education: Stanford University (BA); Yale University (MS, MPhil, PhD)

Deborah A. Prentice (born November 1961) is an American psychologist and university administrator. Since 2023, she has served as the vice-chancellor of the University of Cambridge in England. She was previously the provost at Princeton University and Alexander Stewart 1886 Professor of Psychology and Public Affairs.

== Early life and education ==
Prentice was raised in Oakland, California, where she was educated at state schools and learned the piano. She states she was largely raised by her mother alone, and as a teenager often worked as a piano accompanist.

She graduated with a Bachelor of Arts in human biology and music from Stanford University in 1984. She then pursued graduate studies at Yale University, where she received an M.S. in psychology in 1986, an M.Phil. in psychology in 1987, and a Ph.D. in psychology in 1989.

== Career ==
Prentice began teaching at Princeton University in 1988, and became an assistant professor at Princeton in 1989. Prior to becoming provost on July 1, 2017, Prentice served as Dean of the Faculty from 2014 to 2017, after she had served for twelve years as Head of the Department of Psychology.

Her research focuses on social norms. She writes that her early focus was on attachments to both abstract views and concrete items; she then researched the way in which social groups form a "dynamic system" that both reflects and is affected by the way in which their members act. She has applied her research to methods of helping people to alter problematic behaviors such as overconsumption of alcohol, gender stereotyping, and violence against domestic partners. Her pioneering work on pluralistic ignorance applied to college campus alcohol use is a foundation of numerous campus alcohol education and bystander intervention programs.

In 2025 Prentice's life and work, and the role played by music, was the subject of the BBC Radio 3 programme Private Passions, compered by Michael Berkeley.

=== Provost of Princeton University ===
Prentice became provost on July 1, 2017, serving until 2023.

Prentice is noted for overseeing an expansion in the number of undergraduates, and guiding the university through the COVID-19 pandemic. She oversaw the redesign of student financial aid and stipend packages. She was commended for overseeing a diversity drive which included measures to alleviate systemic racism.

As provost she oversaw two investigations of classics professor Joshua Katz, who after the second investigation was fired in 2022 for not being fully honest and cooperative in the first investigation into a consensual sexual relationship with a student in violation of university policy. This brought some controversy with some faculty members alleging he was being targeted for criticising anti-racist proposals at Princeton, with eight professors writing to Prentice and others in support of Katz.

=== Vice-chancellor of the University of Cambridge ===
Prentice was appointed vice-chancellor of the University of Cambridge, with effect from 1 July 2023. She was also appointed Professor of Social Psychology.

Early in her appointment, she led a drive for free speech, calling for Cambridge students to "lead challenging conversations" and engage in constructive disagreement.

In 2024, Prentice took measures to encourage student entrants from all areas of the UK, concerned that nearly half of students came from London and south-east England.

In 2025, The Sunday Times reported that Prentice had told the Cambridge University Council that she and other Russell Group counterparts had had informal meetings with Reform UK politicians, concerned that they would introduce US President Trump style policies regarding elite institutions, if they came to power at the next general election. Prentice was reported to have said it was "very clear" that Nigel Farage intended to follow this model which has withheld very large amounts of funding from US universities over various political disagreements. A transcript of the discussion had been leaked to the newspaper.

A major incident during her term was the highly public allegations of academic misconduct and fabrication against Professor of Sociology of Education Jason Arday, a consequent university investigation into Arday's academic qualifications, and his subsequent resignation on 5 August 2026. The Daily Telegraph, which had highlighted the allegations during 2026, subsequently claimed "Cambridge academics have turned on the university's vice-chancellor over the Jason Arday affair" and that she had "been accused of a failure of leadership". On 12 August, Prentice announced an independent inquiry would be conducted by senior Cambridge and external academics and that she recognised the "anger and anxiety around this damaging and difficult case". Following Arday being found dead on 14 August, BBC News described the widespread tributes as led by Prentice who said his faculty was "desperately saddened" and that "Our heartfelt sympathies go to Jason Arday's family and friends at this incredibly difficult time", with Prime Minister Andy Burnham saying it was a "a tragedy on so many levels" and that it was a moment for "reflecting how things came to this".

In 2026, Prentice was one of the respondents to an employment tribunal brought and won by Cambridge Professor of Astrophysics Wyn Evans, who alleged the university had retaliated against him as a whistleblower regarding bullying and misogyny at the university. Prentice gave evidence defending a letter which she said she had written to Evans regarding his grievance complaint with assistance from the university registrary, however the tribunal rejected Prentice's statement, saying the letter had been written solely by the registrary and "Professor Prentice had very little to do with it, save for putting her name to it". The tribunal found that Prentice, amongst others, had overseen the "pattern of complaints being ignored or dismissed without examination". Following the judgement, Prentice ordered an independent review of "our HR procedures and practices".

== Personal life ==
Prentice is married to Jeremy Adelman, who leads the global history lab at the Centre for Research in the Arts, Social Sciences and Humanities at the University of Cambridge. They have three children.

== Works ==
- "Pluralistic ignorance and alcohol use on campus: Some consequences of misperceiving the social norm" with D.T. Miller, Journal of Personality and Social Psychology. 64(2): 243–256. doi:10.1037/0022-3514.64.2.243 http://psycnet.apa.org/doiLanding?doi=10.1037%2F0022-3514.64.2.243
- "What women and men should be, shouldn't be, are allowed to be, and don't have to be: The contents of prescriptive gender stereotypes" with E. Carranza, Psychology of Women Quarterly, 26 (2002), 269–281.
- "Essentializing differences between women and men" with D. T. Miller, Psychological Science, 17 (2006), 129–135.
- (2006). "On the distinction between acting like an individual and feeling like an individual" in T. Postmes & J. Jetten (eds.) Individuality and the Group: Advances in Social Identity (37–55). (Sage Publications, 2006).
- "Mobilizing and weakening peer influence as mechanisms for changing behavior: Implications for alcohol intervention programs" in M. J. Prinstein & K. A. Dodge (eds.) Understanding Peer Influence in Children and Adolescents (161–180). (Guilford, 2008).
- "The psychology of social norms and the promotion of human rights" in R. Goodman, D. Jinks, & A. K. Woods (eds.), Understanding Social Action, Promoting Human Rights (Oxford University Press, in press)

Academic offices
Preceded by David S. Lee	Provost of Princeton University; 2017 to 2023	Succeeded by Jennifer Rexford
Preceded by Anthony Freeling (acting)	Vice-Chancellor of the University of Cambridge; 2023 to present	Incumbent
