= Leadership for Learning: the Cambridge Network =

Leadership for Learning (LfL) is a framework and set of principles that arose from the Carpe Vitam project in which practitioners and researchers worked together to develop the practice of leadership for learning. Leadership for Learning: the Cambridge Network, based in the University of Cambridge Faculty of Education, draws together practitioners, schools and organisations concerned with these ideas. The LfL framework and principles have been used in a wide variety of contexts to frame discussions and to inform the evaluation of practice.

== History ==
The Leadership for Learning Project (known as Carpe Vitam after its Swedish commissioning body) was a research and development project focusing on the process by which schools made, and then grew, the connections between learning and leadership. It was funded for three years (2002–2005) by the Wallenberg Foundation in Sweden, with further financial support from participating countries. The project was directed from the University of Cambridge in collaboration with eight different groups of university researchers and their nominated schools in eight cities: Athens, Brisbane, Copenhagen, Innsbruck, London, Oslo, Seattle, and Trenton (New Jersey). Seven countries, eight higher education institutions and 24 schools participated in exploring the connections between leadership and learning through conferences, workshops, school visits and inter-country exchanges.

The researchers did not start from a blank slate or from a neutral stance but from a set of democratic values about leadership and learning. How those values could be translated into practical strategies at school and classroom level, however, was something they planned to discover through experimentation, reflection and collective debate over the life of the project. Part way through that process they began to identify ‘principles for practice’ that would help to clarify and focus attention on the transformations in learning and leadership that were beginning to take place. These five principles were refined and developed throughout the project.

== Leadership for Learning principles for practice ==
The most significant outcome of the project was a set of principles that could be used by researchers, by school leaders, by teachers and students to make the connections between leadership and learning through reflecting on, or researching, their own practice. Five statements came to represent these principles.

Leadership for Learning practice involves:

- Maintaining a focus on learning as an activity
- Creating conditions favourable to learning as an activity
- Creating a dialogue about Leadership for Learning
- The sharing of leadership
- A shared sense of accountability

These five principles are dynamically interrelated, with dialogue forming the connections, a focus on learning and shared leadership mediated by conditions for learning, and all framed by the fifth principle of accountability. ‘A focus on learning’ is quite deliberately placed first because it can be considered as the prime principle, reflecting a commitment to making learning the number one priority – the core of Leadership for Learning. Each headline principle is elaborated through sub-principles that amplify and illustrate.

== The Cambridge Network ==
LfL is under the leadership of Professor John MacBeath and is coordinated by a management team that includes David Frost, Sue Swaffield, John Bangs, Megan Crawford, Panayiotis Antoniou, Ruth Sapsed and Joy Giannaros. It is part of the Leadership for Learning academic group.

The network exists to:

- Improve leadership practices for the benefit of all learners.
- Explore leadership for learning in educational contexts nationally and internationally.
- Support practitioners with advice based on research.
- Help young people to play an active role in improving learning at their school.
- Undertake and facilitate research on leadership for learning.
- Contribute to a leadership for learning knowledge base.
- Influence educational policy.

with the belief that:

- Learning and leadership are a shared, as much as an individual enterprise.
- Leadership should be 'distributed' and exercised at every level.
- Collaborative modes of working strengthen both teams and individuals.
- An independent, critical perspective, informed by research is vital.
- The status quo and received wisdom should be persistently questioned.
