= OER4Schools =

The OER4Schools programme is a teacher professional development programme utilizing information and communication technologies (ICT), focussing on sub-Saharan Africa. It was initiated at the Centre for Commonwealth Education, based at the Faculty of Education, University of Cambridge. Aspects of the OER4Schools project are developed in conjunction with OER Africa.

== Phase 1 (Pilot) ==
The OER4Schools programme started in August 2009 with a pilot phase, that was completed in May 2010. Through this pilot, the programme assessed the feasibility of providing Open Educational Resources (OER) to ICT- and Internet-equipped primary schools in Zambia, and of supporting interactive forms of subject pedagogy with the new resources. It identified the needs of school-based professional development adapted to the local context. The programme is conducted in a North-South partnership between the CCE and institutions in Zambia. It combines stakeholders from various sectors (including educational research, ICT for development [NGOs], government, and the ICT service sector) as a basis for developing methodologies that promise lasting transformation in Zambian primary education. While the project is conducted in Zambia, it is anticipated to be relevant to a wide range of countries in sub-Saharan Africa. Key outputs include models for OER-Pedagogy-ICT adoption in poorly resourced educational systems, and guidance on implementing better learning environments.

In the pilot phase the primary aim of the project was to conduct the necessary research to build a further proposal for external funding over a longer period. We worked with teachers in 3 schools, developing, supporting and trialling uses of OERs combined with new pedagogical approaches for teaching mathematics. There were opportunities for peer observation and reflective practice. The research element recorded classroom practice and assessed participants' reactions and learning, eliciting messages for embedding basic ICT and OER use in teacher education. Findings were presented at the eLearning Africa Conference in Lusaka in May 2010.

== Phase 2 (2010–2012) ==
The second phase started in June 2010, and draws on outcomes of the pilot phase. We developed a professional learning resource for teachers and student teachers, focussing on interactive teaching and learning - with and without ICT. A key element of this resource is the use of unique video clips illustrating interactive practice (produced in Zambian and South African primary classroom contexts) as a stimulus for discussion.

The resource is freely available for re-use under a Creative Commons license. It supports different modes of learning, including collaborative and individual use, as well as blended learning as part of a course. It will be available in a number of formats, appropriate to the varied African environments in which teachers find themselves. It is being embedded in various teacher education and professional development courses administered by teacher colleges and universities in Zambia and elsewhere in sub-Saharan Africa; "taster workshops" have been run successfully with lecturers and students in three higher education settings.

The second phase culminated in trialling the resource with all teachers in Grade 4 to 6 at Chalimbana Basic School throughout 2012. A Zambian teacher facilitated regular workshops with his colleagues.

== Phase 3 (2013–2014) ==
In the third phase (2013), the programme has now broadened to all grades at the school, involving all 35 teachers and all pupils (around 1,000). Workshops are again being facilitated by teachers who participated in earlier phases, leading colleagues (Grades 1–9) through regular teacher group meetings using the resource. Research questions included: What forms of stimulus and support are most effective in developing more interactive pedagogy? What changes took place? What were the supporting and constraining factors? Research methods included audio diaries, lesson and workshop observations, video recording and teacher interviews.

== The OER4Schools professional learning resource ==
The OER4Schools programme developed a professional learning resource that can be used in pre-service or in-service teacher education by groups of teachers working together and ultimately sharing practices with others. The resource supports interactive teaching and active, collaborative learning – generally, and through using mobile technologies (tablets, netbooks, e-book readers etc.), digital open educational resources (OER) and Open Source software – as appropriate for teachers’ own purposes and settings.

The professional learning programme is suitable for low-resourced primary schools and teacher colleges (combined with teaching practice), and freely available as an OER. It consists of 25 two-hour sessions, organised in five units, covering interactive teaching principles, group work, questioning, dialogue, Assessment for Learning, and enquiry-based learning. Each session includes unique, professionally filmed video exemplars of interactive practices in Zambian and South African classrooms (with and without technology), accompanying texts, practical activities and facilitator notes. It is based on an established process for teacher-led discussion, trialling new ideas, peer observation and joint reflection, all stimulated and guided by the professional development materials. The overall goal is to focus on learning, meeting the challenge of moving away from superficial repetition of facts towards deeper learning and understanding. The materials have been participatively developed in conjunction with local stakeholders, including teachers, teacher college lecturers and other partners.

The resources are hosted using MediaWiki and are also available as ZIM files (using Kiwix).
