= Great and Unfortunate Things =

Memoir by Jason Arday

- US first edition cover
- Authors: Jason Arday & Eve Claxton
- Language: English
- Publisher: 37 INK (US); Simon & Schuster UK (UK)
- Publication date: 11 August 2026 (US); 27 August 2026 (UK)
- Pages: 288
- ISBN: 9781668085578

Great and Unfortunate Things: A Memoir is the memoir of British academic Jason Arday, co-written with Eve Claxton. The book details Arday's childhood in South London, his struggles with autism, and his ascent into academia in his adulthood. It was first released on 11 August 2026 in the United States, and 27 August 2026 in the UK. Arday died on 14 August, prior to the book's release in the United Kingdom, amid allegations of academic plagiarism and that he had fabricated many details of his life.

== Publication ==
The publisher Simon & Schuster described it as "Arday's memoir of overcoming remarkable challenges and responding to adversity with resilience, published days before his untimely death on August 14, 2026." Six days before the scheduled US release date, Arday had resigned from his University of Cambridge professorship amidst accusations of academic misconduct and biographical inaccuracies. No notes about the controversy were added, and the text still describes him as "currently" at Cambridge. After Arday's death in mid August, the UK publication went ahead as planned, in accordance with the family's wishes. Despite allegations of plagiarism within his academic work, Simon & Schuster affirmed that "no allegations of plagiarism have been made with respect to Great and Unfortunate Things".

The published version appears to have been toned down from the draft galley that was circulated in January of the same year, and several claims have been withdrawn or scaled back. The Times reported that Simon & Schuster had removed references to Arday's marathon and charity claims on its website a year before the book was published, seeing this as evidence that concerns about the reliability of Arday's claims existed long before they became the subject of widespread media attention. The book also diverges from a number of autobiographical claims Arday made elsewhere.

Arday claimed he was paid "1.4 million" for the book but did not specify whether this was in sterling or United States dollars. Publishers noted this was unusually high for a pre-empt, but was possible. Five days before his death, Arday cancelled a tour promoting the book, which would have involved a bookshop event in Edinburgh and a speech at the University of Cambridge.

== Reception ==
The Daily Telegraph called it "a case study in self-mythologising". Publishers Weekly called it "a stirring story, straightforwardly told".

Sarah Ditum in The Times described the book as "mawkish, self-aggrandising and hard to believe", and suggested that it was well suited to a contemporary liberal audience because it combines powerful themes such as disability, racism, poverty, adversity and personal triumph in a narrative that encourages readers to admire Arday and the institutions and individuals who supported him. In her view, the emotional force of the story made readers less inclined to question whether its individual elements were true, and she found it problematic that "[p]eople are able to prosper by telling a story that flatters their audience into thinking that the audience are on the side of the good people."

The Atlantic wrote the memoir presents Arday's life as an extraordinary story of suffering, perseverance and improbable success. The magazine highlighted significant discrepancies between the memoir, earlier accounts and Arday's original book proposal, casting doubt on its reliability.

The Observer linked the controversy surrounding Arday's memoir to wider concerns about publishers' fact-checking practices. It referred to The Salt Path scandal in 2025, which exposed similar questions about the reliability of bestselling memoirs, and wrote that Arday's case renewed debate about whether publishers should do more to verify extraordinary claims before publication.

The Washington Free Beacon pointed out Arday's memoir contains striking similarities to plots and characters from television shows and films he has publicly admired, including Spartacus, Forrest Gump, and Neighbours. It highlighted parallels involving cancer, epilepsy, brain surgery, comas, illiteracy, childhood difficulties and extraordinary athletic perseverance. The review suggested that some of these biographical claims appeared only after similar fictional storylines had been broadcast, and that the memoir's narrative may have been substantially shaped by popular culture rather than faithfully recounting Arday's personal experiences.

As Great and Unfortunate Things was published in the UK, Alexandra Pringle, the former head of Bloomsbury, claimed that publishers are not responsible for fact-checking memoirs because they are "verging on fiction". She suggested that memoirs should not necessarily be expected to provide a completely factual account, whereas autobiographies could be expected to be "absolutely true". In her response in the Observer, Erica Wagner questioned whether ordinary readers make such a distinction and argued that they reasonably expect some connection between memoir and factual truth. Similarly, Sam Leith wrote in The Spectator that the distinction between memoir and autobiography does not mean that memoirs are exempt from standards of factual accuracy. He argued that readers understand that memory is imperfect and accept some degree of embellishment or uncertainty, but that this does not mean that the fundamental events of a memoir can be invented. In his view, major events — illnesses, publications, achievements and other elements of the historical record — are objectively verifiable, and readers are entitled to expect them to be truthful. This is particularly important because memoirs are sold as nonfiction, and "the idea that this stuff actually happened is their main selling point to readers and therefore driver of profits for publishers". Leith compared the issue with the 2003 controversy surrounding James Frey's A Million Little Pieces, which Frey initially presented to publishers as a novel but which became a bestseller when it was sold to readers as a memoir.

US sales for the first five days were 433 print copies sold. This figure does not include e-book or audiobook sales. In the UK, the book sold 2,979 copies in the last week of August 2026.
