= Alexandra Pringle =

British publisher (born 1953)

Alexandra Pringle Hon FRSL
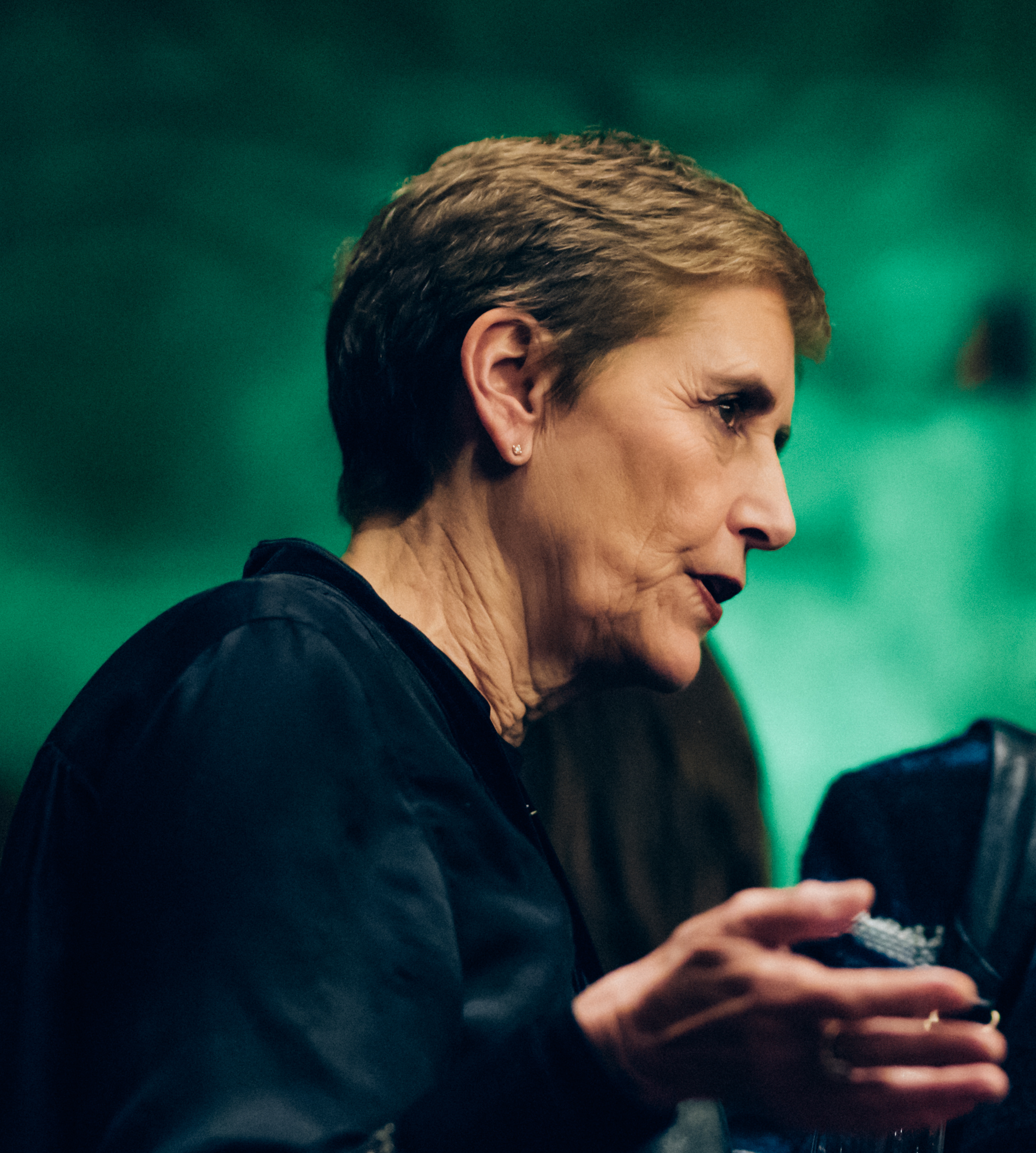
- Born: 1953 (age 72–73); London, England
- Education: Cambridgeshire College of Arts and Technology
- Occupation: Publisher
- Title: Editor-in-chief, Bloomsbury Publishing
- Term: 1999–present
- Spouses: John Hilton (div. 2000); Richard Peter Stroud
- Relatives: William Pringle (Liberal MP) (grandfather); Pringle baronets

Alexandra Pringle, Hon FRSL (born 1953), is a British publisher. A founding director of Virago Press, she has been editor-in-chief of Bloomsbury Publishing since 2000.

== Biography ==
Of Scottish descent and kinsmen of the Pringle baronets of Stichill, her father Alexander Pringle (1920–2010) was the youngest son of the Liberal MP, William Pringle. In 1953 at Edith Grove SW10, she attended Cambridgeshire College of Arts and Technology (CCAT), after which she embarked on her career in publishing at the British magazine Art Monthly, before joining the women's publisher Virago in 1978. She worked on Virago's Modern Classics series and in 1984 she became their Editorial Director until 1991, when she moved to Hamish Hamilton with the same job title. Between 1994 and 1999, she was a literary agent for writers such as Amanda Foreman, Maggie O'Farrell and Ali Smith.

Pringle joined Bloomsbury in 1999, as Head of Adult Publishing. Pringle is enthusiastic about authors and books but does not believe that paper has to be involved. At one point, Stephen King told his publishers that his books must only be on paper, to which Pringle commented in The Independent that authors should not tell their readers how they should read. Her authors at Bloomsbury include Margaret Atwood, Elizabeth Gilbert, Sheila Hancock, Celia Imrie, Jhumpa Lahiri, Colum McCann, Anne Michaels, Ann Patchett, George Saunders, Kamila Shamsie, Patti Smith, Kate Summerscale and Barbara Trapido among others.

In March 2018, Pringle handed over the day-to-day running of Bloomsbury's Adult Trade publishing division to Emma Hopkin, while remaining as Editor-in-Chief.

Pringle stated with regard to Jason Arday's memoir Great and Unfortunate Things – released around the time allegations of plagiarism allegations, academic fraud and misleading biographical claims were made against Arday – that a published memoir is a "work of literature which is verging on fiction", and that therefore publishers have no responsibility for checking its factual accuracy.

== Awards ==
Pringle has been awarded Honorary doctorates from Anglia Ruskin University (2009) and Warwick University (2014).

She was elected an Honorary Fellow of the Royal Society of Literature in 2017 and is patron of Index on Censorship.

== Private life ==
She lived in Hampstead, London, after marrying Tim Hilton in 1984 (divorced 2000). She married, secondly, Richard Peter Stroud, a writer and film-maker, who is chairman of the Chelsea Arts Club. They live on the Chelsea Embankment, London SW3.

== See also ==
- Clan Pringle
