= Jason Arday =

British academic (1985–2026)

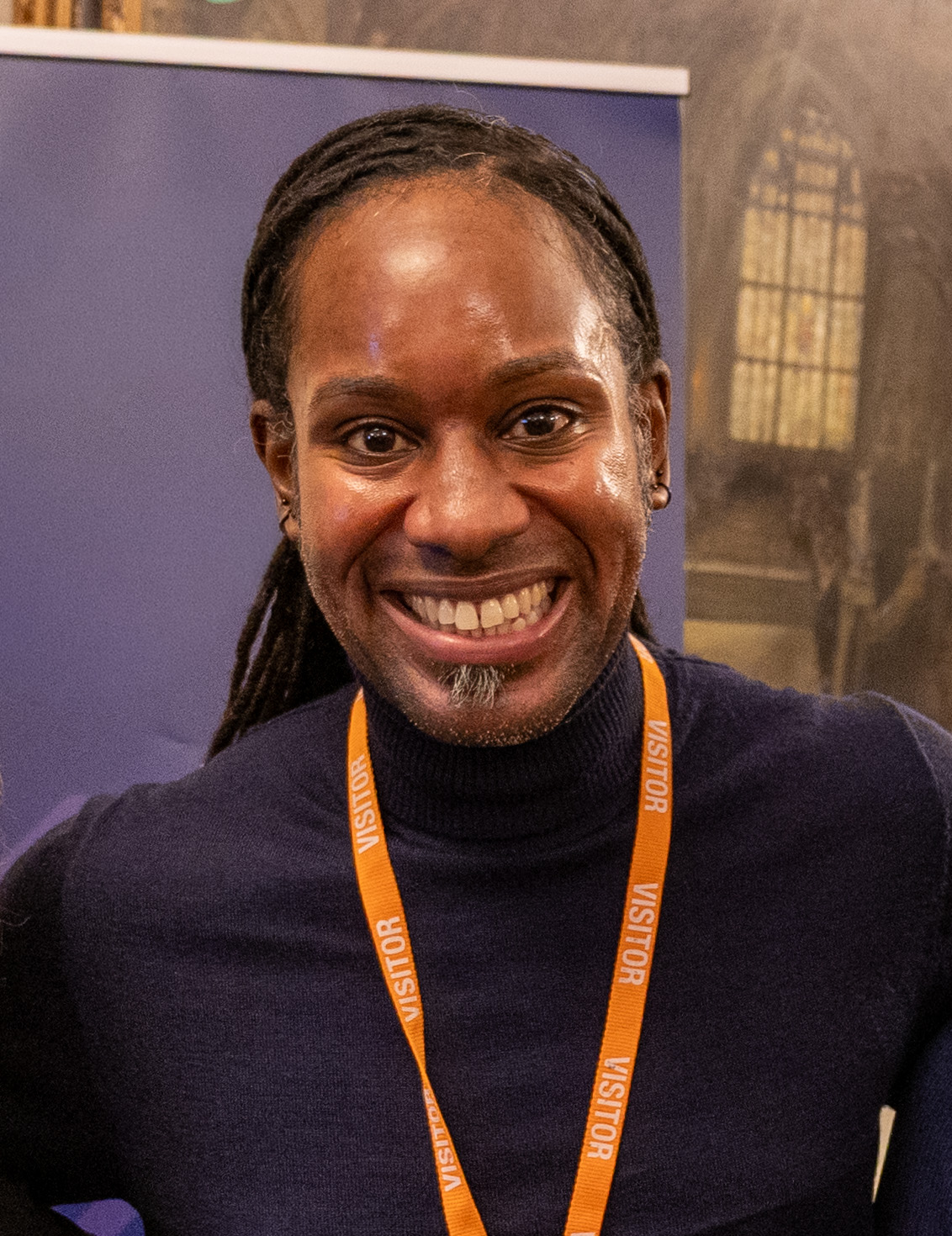
- Arday in 2024
- Born: Jason Atta Kwei Arday; 9 May 1985; Clapham, London, England
- Died: 14 August 2026 (aged 41); Battersea, London, England
- Occupation: Academic
- Spouse: Debbie McKenzie (m. 2014; sep. 2019)
- Children: 2

Academic background
- Education: St Mary's University (BA, MA); Liverpool John Moores University (PhD)
- Thesis: An Exploration of Peer-Mentoring among Student Teachers' [sic] to Inform Reflective Practice within the Context of Action Research (2015)
- Doctoral advisor: Phil Vickerman

Academic work
- Discipline: Education
- Sub-discipline: Sociology of education; Sociology of race and ethnic relations; Social stratification; Social mobility
- Institutions: Leeds Beckett University (2014‍–‍2018); University of Roehampton (2018‍–‍2019); University of Warwick (2019); Durham University (2019–2022); University of Glasgow (2022‍–‍2023); University of Cambridge (2023‍–‍2026)
- Jason Arday's voice Arday during a speech at the 2024 Greenbelt Festival; Recorded August 2024

Jason Atta Kwei Arday (9 May 1985 – 14 August 2026) was a British academic and a professor of sociology of education. He joined the faculty of the University of Cambridge in 2023, becoming the youngest black professor in the university's history. In August 2026, he resigned following accusations of academic misconduct and numerous biographical inaccuracies. Arday was found dead at his London home nine days later.

Born in London to Ghanaian parents, Arday said he was diagnosed with autism, was mute until 11, and could not read or write until adulthood. After receiving a PhD from Liverpool John Moores University in 2015, Arday taught physical education at Leeds Beckett and Roehampton, education studies at Warwick, and sociology at Durham and Glasgow, where he became a professor in 2022. From 2018, he produced academic publications, some focusing on race and racism in the British education sector, and others offering autoethnographic reflections about his life as a neurodivergent black academic. After joining Cambridge in 2023, Arday attracted media attention and made television appearances over the following years. He was given several honorary degrees, and was appointed to trustee and advisory roles in civil society.

In 2026, allegations of plagiarism, falsified research, and misleading claims relating to his academic and personal history were widely reported in both the British and international media. Although acknowledging mistakes in his work, Arday maintained he was not a liar, noted that an institutional panel had cleared his PhD thesis of deliberate plagiarism, and argued that there was a racially motivated campaign against him. Shortly after Cambridge announced an investigation into his appointment, Arday resigned. Some media commentators and academics accused Cambridge's employment process of failing to uphold academic standards, argued that the controversy emboldened critics of equality, diversity, and inclusion (EDI) initiatives, and stated that the case increased challenges for black scholars. His memoir, Great and Unfortunate Things, was published around the same period.

Prime Minister Andy Burnham and other political figures expressed condolences upon Arday's death. Various politicians and other public figures said that Arday had been subjected to a racist public shaming by sections of the media, with some calling for a public inquiry into this and greater press regulation. Some media sources defended their obligation to report allegations of academic misconduct and The Guardian noted that journalists investigating the claims were facing abuse.

== Early life and education ==
Jason Atta Kwei Arday was born in Clapham, South London, on 9 May 1985 to Ghanaian parents. He was the third of four brothers and also grew up in Clapham. His mother was a mental health nurse and his father a chef.

Arday attended Heathbrook Primary School in Nine Elms. At secondary school, Arday earned two GCSEs, in textiles and physical education (PE), before studying for a BTEC course in sport and development at Merton College in Morden. According to his memoir, Arday spent many afternoons missing secondary school and playing snooker, regularly winning money in tournaments across London. He wrote that, as a student, he made money by entering pro–am nine-ball pool tournaments and frequently reaching the latter stages, winning prize money. Arday played for Lewisham Borough F.C. as a goalkeeper, a semi-professional club that sits in the lowest tier of the National League System.

Arday said that at the age of three, he received diagnoses of autism, global developmental delay, deafness, and dyscalculia, and was non-verbal until the age of 11. The claim of being non-verbal was later contested in the media. Arday also said he could not read or write until he was 18, and that he received a diagnosis of dyslexia in his first year of university. The statement that he was illiterate until 18 also came under media scrutiny.

Arday reported being attacked at the age of 18 and developing epilepsy as a result. According to Arday, two of his attackers later became his students, with one asking him to be the godfather of his child and Arday "gratefully accepted". He claimed that in 2006, aged 21, he went to Brazil with the charity WaterAid to install water pumps for poor communities in the favelas of Rio de Janeiro; media later disputed this, as WaterAid did not send volunteers abroad. In 2012, Arday was a bearer of the Olympic Torch. That year, he met the tennis player Andy Murray on the television show Surprise Surprise.

=== Higher education ===
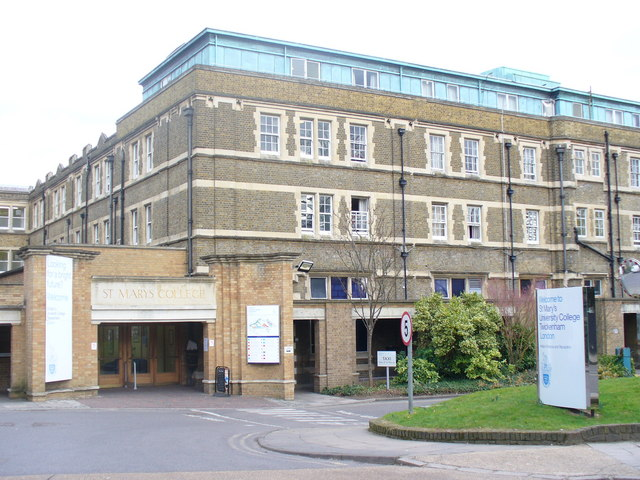
Arday studied for his BA and MA degrees at St Mary's University, Twickenham, which later awarded him an honorary doctorate.

In 2005, Arday began undergraduate study in education studies with physical education at St Mary's University, Twickenham, graduating with a Bachelor of Arts (BA) degree, validated by the University of Surrey, in 2008. He remained to complete a Master of Arts (MA) degree in education and pedagogy.

Arday then attended Liverpool John Moores University, where he gained a Doctor of Philosophy (PhD) degree in education. He claimed to have completed his PhD in two-and-a-half years, and to have relearnt the content of his dissertation weeks before defending it due to memory loss following the removal of a brain tumour and suffering a transient ischemic attack, or mini-stroke. Arday's thesis, An Exploration of Peer-Mentoring among Student Teachers' [sic] to Inform Reflective Practice within the Context of Action Research, was completed in 2015 under the supervision of Phil Vickerman, who hired Arday as a lecturer at LJMU. According to Arday's memoir, one examiner remarked about his thesis, "I am struggling to see that there is any original contribution here".

== Academic career ==
=== Early career ===
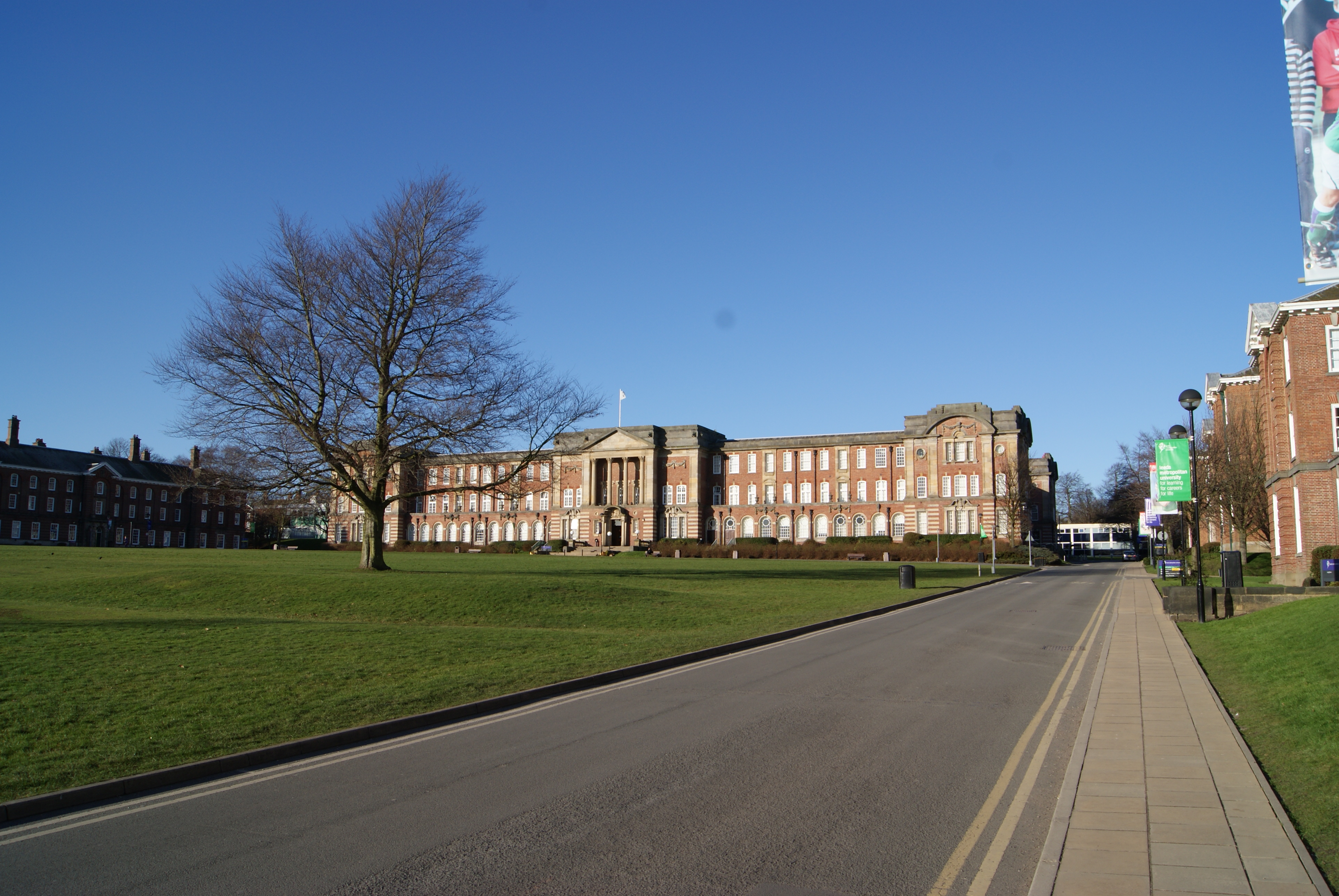
Arday taught Physical Education and Sport Pedagogy at Leeds Beckett University. The university's James Graham building is pictured.

In 2010 Arday was a sports lecturer at Richmond College. It was reported that he completed 30 marathons in 35 days raising £6,000 towards the Shooting Star Children's Hospice and the homelessness charity Shelter. It was also reported that Arday had endured a hairline fracture to his leg and raised £100,000 for charity since starting fundraising at age 17.

Arday gained an academic post at Leeds Beckett University. According to his memoir, he joined this university as a physical education specialist in 2014, while he was still working on his PhD. Arday wrote that, despite having no training or qualifications in sociology, he had "expertise born of lived experience", and that while working in sport, he trained himself to be a sociologist by night. In 2013, Arday became a trustee for the Runnymede Trust, a race equality campaign group based in London, and remained so until 2024.

Arday claimed he began a job in 2017 as head of the sports department at "a university in London" before his position was cut for financial reasons on his second day. In 2018, Arday gained a senior lectureship at the University of Roehampton. That year, his first academic article was published. Also in 2018, Palgrave Macmillan published an edited volume co-edited by Arday with Heidi Safia Mirza, Dismantling Race in Higher Education: Racism, Whiteness and Decolonising the Academy. It was reviewed by Izram Chaudry in the Multicultural Education Review, in which they called it "a protest against the treatment of Black, Asian and Minority Ethnic (BAME) staff and students in British academia", one that assembled contributions from "the most eminent anti-racist academics". Two years later, a reviewer referred to Arday as "a scholar of race, social justice, cultural studies and education". Arday said he then secured a teaching position at "one of the UK's most prestigious universities", but soon resigned as he was given additional unwanted responsibility for recruiting black students.

In 2019, Arday became a senior teaching fellow in the Centre for Education Studies at the University of Warwick. He subsequently became an associate professor of sociology at Durham University. At Durham, Arday conceived and developed Pro:NE, a project to run events, training and workshops to encourage people of colour to enter academia across North East England. Operating in collaboration with five other universities in the region, it secured £2.5 million of funding. In 2020, he was interviewed for a BBC News article discussing the proportional under-representation of black, Asian and ethnic minority PhD candidates. That year, he wrote a report for The Black Curriculum, which stated that the UK school curriculum "systematically omits the contribution of black British history in favour of a dominant white, Eurocentric curriculum".

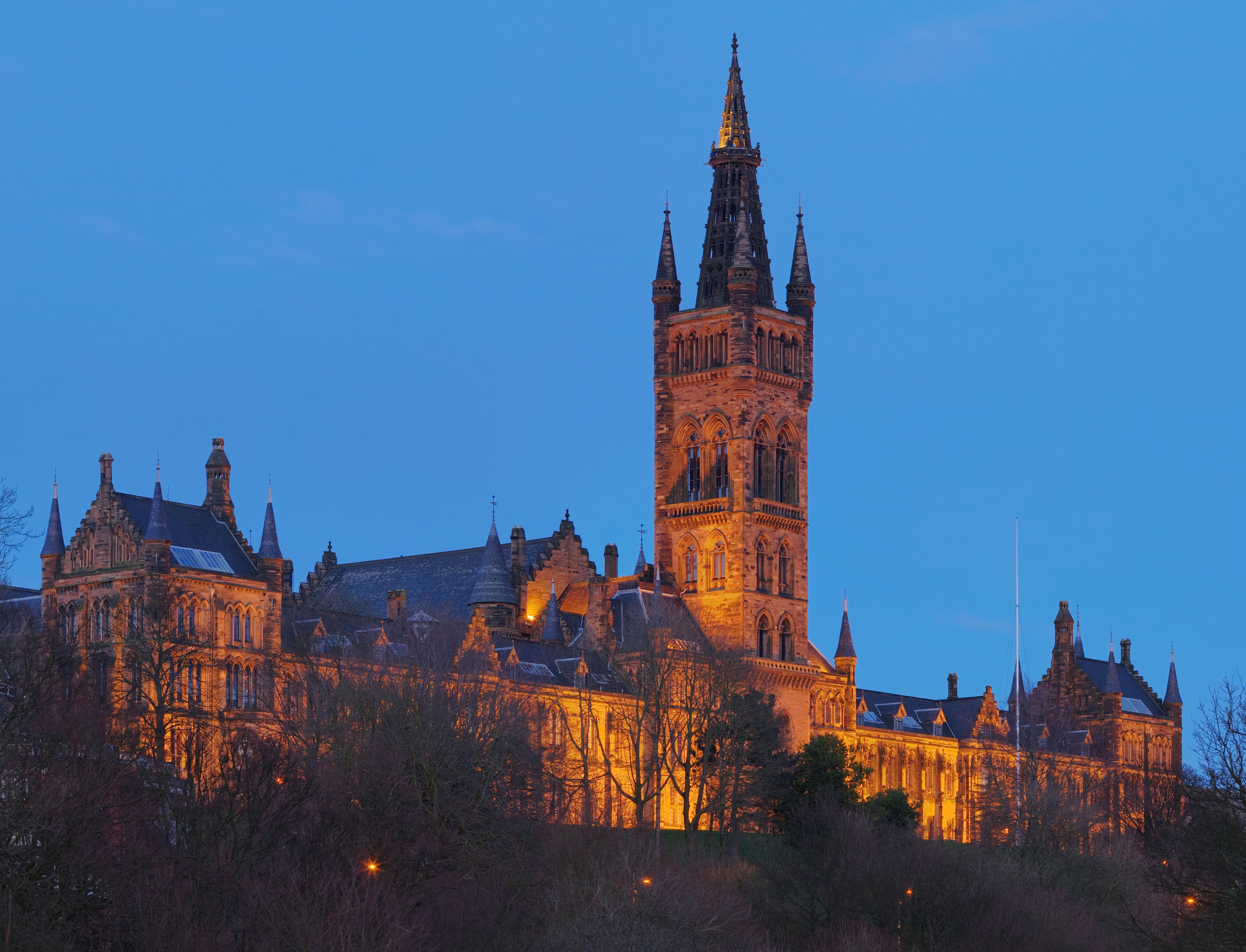
Between 2022 and 2023, Arday taught the sociology of education at the University of Glasgow (pictured).

In 2020, Routledge published Arday's monograph, Cool Britannia and Multi-Ethnic Britain: Uncorking the Champagne Supernova, referencing the "Cool Britannia" pop culture phenemonon of the 1990s. The book examines that decade in Britain and its music through Arday's own autoethnographical lens, with a particular focus on racial issues such as the murder of Stephen Lawrence and the resulting Macpherson Inquiry. He said that he had interviewed just over 80 people as part of his research for the monograph. In 2026 Professor of Music, Culture and Society Ian Pace reviewed the monograph in The Critic, calling it "intellectually threadbare, methodologically indefensible and textually compromised", arguing that it failed in its aim of providing a sociological analysis of 1990s British culture.

From January 2022 to March 2023, Arday was professor of sociology of education at the University of Glasgow. In 2022, he wrote a report on race equality at the Liverpool School of Tropical Medicine, which found that ethnic minority staff were discriminated against, there were few ethnic minority leaders, and that their research had a "dominant Eurocentric approach". In a 2023 interview with The Guardian, Arday said that he had "barely slept" for the previous 15 years due to his precarious employment.

=== University of Cambridge ===
Jason Arday is an exceptional scholar of race, inequality and education. He will contribute significantly to Cambridge's research in this area and to addressing the under-representation of people from socioeconomically disadvantaged backgrounds, especially those from black, Asian, and other minority ethnic communities... His experiences highlight the barriers faced by many under-represented groups across higher education and especially at leading universities. Cambridge has a responsibility to do everything it can to address this by creating academic spaces where everyone feels they belong.

— Bhaskar Vira, pro-vice-chancellor for education at the University of Cambridge, 2023

In February 2023, the University of Cambridge announced Arday's appointment as professor of sociology of education in the Faculty of Education. This made him the sixth black professor at Cambridge at the time, and the youngest black professor ever appointed at the university. Sally Morgan, Baroness Morgan of Huyton, chaired the appointment board for the professorship. The hiring process was informed by the university's equality and inclusion working group. Arday became a Fellow of Jesus College.

On his appointment, Hilary Cremin, head of the Faculty of Education, described Arday as "the best in the world in terms of the research that you do." Bhaskar Vira, the university's pro-vice-chancellor for education, similarly called him "an exceptional scholar of race, inequality and education. He will contribute significantly to Cambridge's research in this area". Arday declared his desire to make higher education more accessible and democratic, hoping that his appointment would "provide me with the leverage to lead that agenda nationally and globally".

Arday's appointment received wide publicity because of his reported life story. The Guardian later said Arday had been a "superstar academic", The Daily Telegraph labelled him Cambridge's "diversity poster boy", and The Atlantic suggested he had become "the world's most famous living sociologist". BBC News's education editor, Branwen Jeffreys, observed that the appointment was "hailed [...] as a progressive moment". In January 2024 Arday was appointed to ITV's cultural advisory council. In February 2024, he was a guest on the BBC TV current affairs panel programme Question Time, and in December he was guest editor of the BBC Radio 4 news and current affairs programme Today.

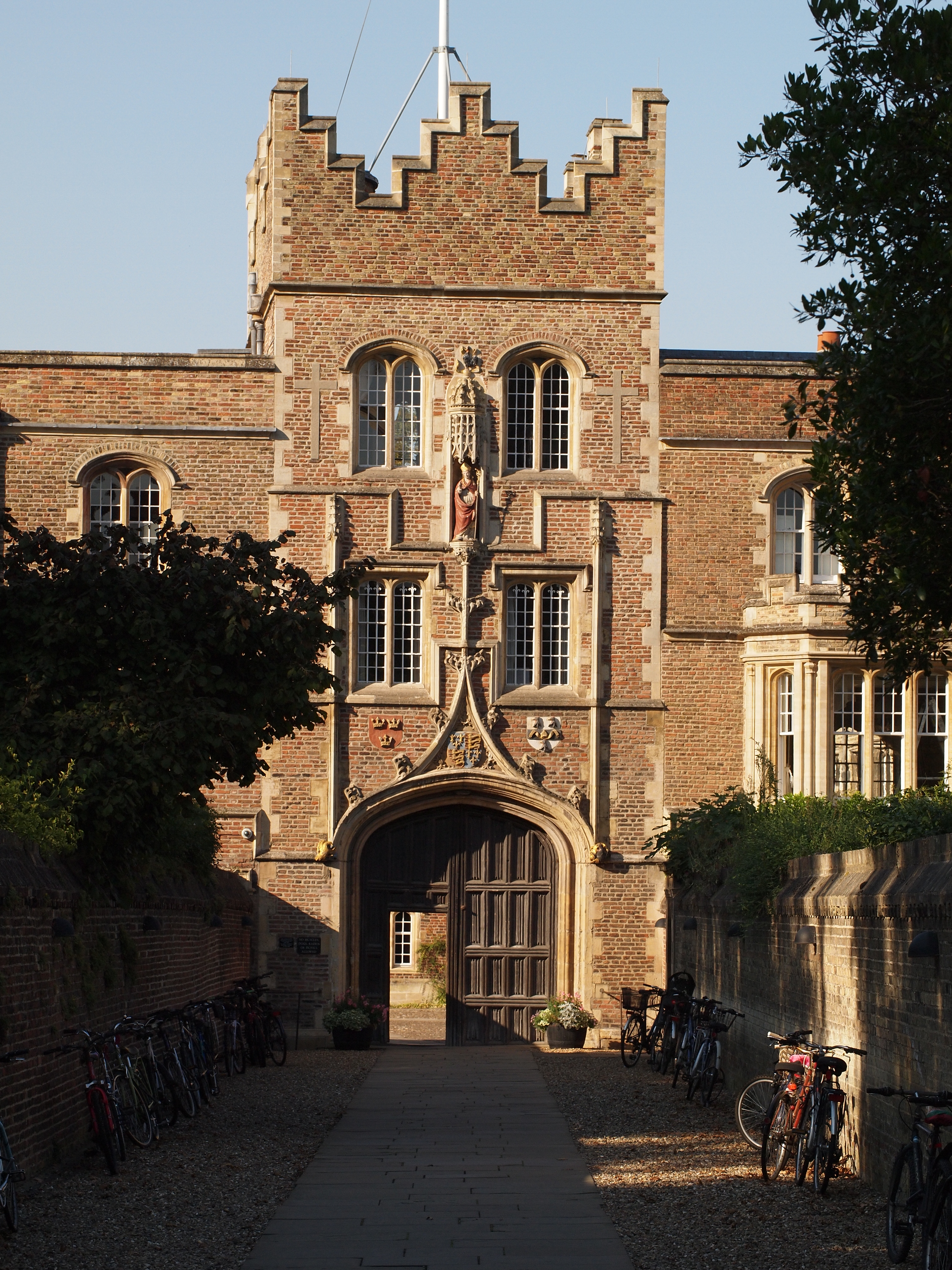
Arday was appointed a Fellow of Jesus College, Cambridge (entrance pictured).

In the two years after receiving his Cambridge position, Arday was awarded honorary doctorates from Anglia Ruskin University, Southampton Solent University, the University of Westminster, South Bank Colleges, and St Mary's University, Twickenham. In 2023, he received the "Most Inspirational Person of the Year Award" at the MBCC (Multicultural Business and Community Champion) Awards, was placed fourth in the Shaw Trust's list of the 100 most influential disabled people in the UK, and was awarded an honorary fellowship by the British Science Association.

In 2025, he became patron of Get Further, a charity promoting English and mathematics education. He served on the Royal Society's Diversity and Inclusion Committee between 2023 and 2026 and as a member of its Rosalind Franklin Award committee from 2024 to 2025. By 2026, he was listed as a trustee of the Adult Literacy Trust, Autism Action, and the British Sociological Association. Arday also signed up to speakers' bureaux and addressed conventions of a range of associations, including at gatherings of the Association of British Insurers and the U.S. National Association of Funeral Directors.

In 2025, Princeton University Press published We See Things They'll Never See: Love, Hope and Neurodiversity, a book co-written by Arday and Chantelle Jessica Lewis of the University of Oxford. The book used the authors' favourite songs as an autoethnographic means of discussing their experiences with neurodivergence. Reviewing it for the British Journal of Educational Studies, Charlotte White and Jessica Bradley called it an "important book" and "an urgent call to action". Similarly, in the Sociological Review Foundation, Alexa MacDermot wrote that "Lewis and Arday's call to action is a visceral demand for change, particularly in education, that we can all implement in our daily lives". Siobhan O'Neill, writing in Ethnic and Racial Studies, called it "an original and valuable contribution for those theorising and working toward social and racial justice", arguing that a "real strength" of the work was its "approach to intersectionality".

==== Later evaluations of Arday's appointment ====
Following the allegations around Arday's work in 2026, many commentators questioned his Cambridge appointment. The Guardian noted that such a senior appointment was unusual for someone as young as 37, particularly given Arday's "slim track record of research and publications compared with those appointed to similar chairs at Cambridge". The New York Times stated that he was an "early career scholar and underqualified, by the school's own standards", for the professorship, given his modest publication record and the fact he had not supervised a PhD student through to the completion of their project. They added that of the four finalists interviewed for the position, two of whom were women of colour, the other three were all "more senior scholars" than Arday.

Roger Mosey, a former Master of Selwyn College, Cambridge, said that Arday was a "compelling candidate" for the role because of his claims to have autism and to have been unable to read until he was 18. Senior Cambridge academic Priyamvada Gopal suggested that Arday appealed to the university because of his "media visibility", and that this may have been "at the expense of other aspects of a CV that one would normally take into account". Philosopher Kathleen Stock similarly told BBC News that Arday's hire was motivated by a university "desperate for good press".

Some media alleged that Cambridge appointed Arday to the position because he was black. The Times of India later noted that Arday "was presented as an inspiring figure and a symbol of progress in an institution that has faced criticism over the historical under-representation of Black academics". The BBC reported that, as of 2025, Cambridge's black academics numbered 75 out of 6,180, and that the university had "spent the last decade working to redress the perception that the institution is a bastion of affluent white privilege". In The Guardian, the journalist Jason Okundaye commented that Cambridge treated Arday "not as a scholar but as a mascot, one who was particularly expedient for an institution that had been regularly embarrassed" by its low numbers of black students and staff. In Okundaye's view, Arday was used as "a vehicle for Cambridge to signal its institutional progress".

== Allegations of misconduct and fabrication ==
=== Initial concerns ===
In May 2023, David Harris, an emeritus professor at Plymouth Marjon University, emailed Arday to enquire about similarities between sentences in Arday's 2018 Social Sciences article and an earlier BMJ Open article by Anjum Memon. Arday responded: "Instead of spending your time trying to dismantle racism and ableism, you have spent what I assume is hours combing through my work looking for mistakes [...] Anything further from you will be considered bullying and harassment." Arday contacted police to report Harris for harassment. Devon and Cornwall Police, in whose area Harris lived, concluded there was no case to pursue. Harris's colleague Martyn Hammersley, an emeritus professor of The Open University, then wrote to Cambridge alerting them to his own concerns, including substantial plagiarism from two sources. Social Sciences published a correction to Arday's article, with revised citations, in December 2023.

Times Higher Education reporter Jack Grove then investigated Arday's alleged plagiarism and assembled a 63-page report; in September 2025 he contacted Arday for his response. Arday responded with a SLAPP letter from Carter-Ruck, a legal firm specialising in libel, after which the Times Higher Education chose to spike the story. Grove said that the story could have tied the publication up in months of expensive litigation. Arday made a complaint about Grove to the Metropolitan Police, alleging harassment that was affecting his mental health; the police asked Grove to desist from further contact with Arday. Mark Rowley, Commissioner of the Metropolitan Police, later said that the complaint about Grove should not have been taken forward.

Having been alerted in 2025 to allegations of plagiarism in Arday's PhD thesis, Liverpool John Moores University—which had awarded him his PhD—established a misconduct panel. Arday did not dispute the allegations of plagiarism, but said he had not received adequate supervision given his autism and learning disabilities, and described the allegations against him as being part of an "insidious and relentless" strategy to undermine black academics. Accepting that there were problems with Arday's supervision, the panel concluded that the similarities between Arday's thesis and an earlier PhD thesis by another academic were the result of "honest and reasonable error", not deliberate plagiarism, and were "well within the accepted range of compliance with the academic standards of the time". The university later disclosed that it had become aware of misconduct allegations in September 2025, and that an Academic Misconduct Panel formally reviewed the allegations between October 2025 and March 2026.

In April 2026, Arday delivered a keynote speech at the 75th anniversary conference of the British Sociological Association. His talk, "Wanted Dead or Alive: the Playbook", argued that conservative activists used a distinctive "playbook" to discredit black academics, such as Claudine Gay, by accusing them of plagiarism, citation errors, and inconsistencies. He said the situation was "abhorrent," "evil", and a "cancer that we need to eradicate from academia", and called on his peers to defend him.

=== Public accusations ===
Allegations of plagiarism became public in July 2026 through a Substack post by Nathan Cofnas, a proponent of scientific racism who was at the time a postdoctoral researcher in philosophy at Ghent University. Cofnas said he had run Arday's PhD thesis through plagiarism detection software and discovered that "many passages are lifted with minimal editing, sometimes retaining copy-editing mistakes from the original source". The Guardian later suggested that reception of the allegations was affected by Cofnas's views on race. Cofnas had written in a 2014 blog post that, in a meritocracy, "Blacks would disappear from almost all high-profile positions outside of sports and entertainment", a statement that had led to him being fired from Emmanuel College, Cambridge in 2024.

On 24 July, an article by Gordon Rayner in The Daily Telegraph alleged that Arday's published works, including his PhD thesis, contained similar or identical passages to other academic works.

On 27 July, Retraction Watch broke the story that Arday had put legal pressure on Times Higher Education to prevent it from reporting on his plagiarism. The Retraction Watch article documented "extensive plagiarism" by Arday, and flagged additional potential research integrity violations, including apparent failures to obtain informed consent from interviewees, data fabrication, and misrepresention of his research methodologies.

On 1 August, The Guardian published its own investigation by Lanre Bakare, highlighting wider discrepancies in claims Arday had made about his life. On 6 August, Emma Yeomans in The Times reported evidence of falsified research as well as plagiarism. These journalists' reports were amplified elsewhere; analysis by Matt Walsh found that printed editions of British newspapers featured around 140 articles about Arday in the fortnight before his death, with further coverage online. Arday's case made headlines across the political spectrum, attracted media attention abroad, and featured heavily across social media.

When Bakare challenged Arday over accusations of plagiarism, Arday said "there have been multiple thorough investigations across several institutions as a result of the allegations, and immense scrutiny, including with an academic misconduct panel who concluded that there was no plagiarism or academic misconduct."

In an interview with The Times, Arday admitted that he had made errors in his thesis and early academic work. He said these were due to his autism, and that he relied on mimicry to make sense of information. He argued that if other academics' work was similarly scrutinised it would show similar errors, and that there was a racially motivated campaign to remove him from his Cambridge position. He added:

I hold myself accountable and other people should hold me accountable. We're talking about academia here. I didn't murder somebody. I think the cruelty that I've experienced, and the positioning of me as this kind of liar and fantasist is totally unacceptable.

=== Academic misconduct claims ===
Media outlets reported allegations that Arday's work showed evidence of plagiarism. Investigators identified many passages in Arday's PhD thesis that appeared to replicate text from a 2009 dissertation by Paula Zwozdiak-Myers. Arday's 2018 article in Social Sciences was also reported to have many passages taken from an article by Anjum Memon. Further questions were raised about the possibility of falsified research. Investigation suggested that statements that Arday claimed had come from his research informants had actually been copied from Memon's article. The Times also highlighted that, in one article, Arday attributed a quote to a Latin American academic he had interviewed, yet in another publication attributed the same quote to an Asian undergraduate.

The Times further alleged a falsified statement about funding; a 2021 article by Arday reported that the research was financed by the charity Mind, which the organisation denied. The Telegraph reported that Arday had for several years claimed to have published a book titled Being Young, Black and Male: Challenging the Dominant Discourse with Palgrave Macmillan. The publisher said it had originally accepted a proposal for the book but had abandoned any plans for publication several years prior to Arday's public claim. The newspaper also stated that, since 2019, Arday had claimed to have published Using Reflective Practice and Peer-Mentoring to Support Black and Ethnic Minority Educators, but it was unclear if it had ever been published.

Arday also made numerous claims about having previously held academic positions at various universities for which there were no records of him ever being employed by those academic institutions; several of these institutions have publicly denied and refuted Arday's claims of having been employed by them. The University of Glasgow and Ohio State University refuted Arday's claims that he had held visiting professorship roles at those institutions. Nelson Mandela University stated that he had been only a temporary adjunct professor prior to November 2025, and not a visiting professor as claimed. Arday also claimed he completed a master's degree in psychodynamic practice at Birkbeck, University of London, and had become a fully qualified counsellor. Birkbeck said it had no record of him studying there.

=== Other allegations ===
Media scrutinised various claims that Arday made about his youth. Arday said he had been non-verbal until the age of 11. A schoolmate and neighbour interviewed by The Daily Telegraph denied this, and a speech professional who worked with Arday when he was young said his claims were false. In response, a close childhood friend said that reporters had sought quotes that would match their storyline from people who were not in his class or were otherwise not close to Arday. A parent of a childhood friend said he had "severe learning difficulties" as a child and that she did not witness him speaking until he was 14–15.

In 2022, Arday said he was involved in a programme called Seven Up as a child, "when they follow you over the duration of your life,.. at [ages] 7, 14, 21. I was pulled out of the project when I was 14." Gareth Corfield of The Daily Telegraph stated that it was impossible for Arday to have appeared in the televised documentary programme Seven Up!, as it first aired two decades before Arday's birth. Celia Walden said that a BBC spokesperson also denied that Arday was in the spin-off Up New Generation, which followed people who were aged seven in 2000. Some of Arday's supporters stated that he was referring to a community project of the same name, not a television show. Arday's claim to have regularly won prize money in snooker tournaments as a teenager is not supported by CueTracker, which records him participating in only one tournament, in which he did not win prize money.

Arday's charitable work was also questioned. For example, he said he worked on projects abroad for the charity WaterAid. The charity told The Daily Telegraph that it did not send volunteers abroad. Media scrutiny also examined Arday's claim to have run 600 miles (970 km) in six days (a near world record), to have raised "£5.5m for over 80 charities", and to have run 30 marathons in 35 days, the last nine marathons with a hairline fracture of the fibula. Grove said that there was "almost no evidence [...] that [Arday] had completed any of these runs, [...] despite lesser runs gaining acres of publicity in local and national news". When these claims were challenged in news media, Arday stated that the 600 miles had been completed over a period of 12 days, including rest days, and that the fundraising was done as "part of a syndicate of about 100 people". After The Guardian asked him to identify some of these individuals, he responded that he had signed non-disclosure agreements preventing him from doing so.

Arday said that at Cambridge he received so much online abuse that his email messages had to be screened before he read them. He added that he had received bullets and bananas in the post and that twice a masked man had come to his work and threatened him, on one occasion with a knife. An investigation by The Guardian found no evidence of this masked intruder on CCTV and no other staff had reported seeing the figure. Arday did not report either incident to the university authorities at the time or told his colleagues that there had been a threatening man on campus, although he had previously said he had hit a panic button.

Also scrutinised was Arday's claim that a pig's head had been sent to his parents' home and that the Metropolitan Police had identified the butchers' shop from which the pig had been purchased. The Guardian found no supporting evidence of these claims, with the Metropolitan Police denying that an investigation had taken place, and the butchers' shop in question stating that no police officers had ever visited. In response to these reports, Arday stood by his account, saying: "To be honest with you, I thought you'd just believe me. Why would I lie?"

=== Initial response ===
In response to The Daily Telegraph's initial publication of allegations in July, David Harris told the paper that Arday's works appeared to show serious plagiarism. David Sanders, associate professor at Purdue University, who writes on scientific misconduct for Times Higher Education, reviewed the 63 page dossier of text comparisons prepared by Jack Grove for that publication and stated: "There is no question that there is extensive plagiarism." Robert Dingwall, an emeritus professor of social sciences at two universities in Nottingham, recommended an impartial investigation, stating: "In the current climate, it is difficult to comment on allegations of plagiarism against a prominent minority scholar without seeming to take sides on EDI" (equality, diversity and inclusion). (Note: EDI stands for "equality, diversity, and inclusion" and is largely comparable to "diversity, equity, and inclusion" (DEI))

Cambridge University initially defended Arday, stating that he was "the victim of a vile campaign to undermine his credibility" and that his PhD thesis had been cleared of deliberate plagiarism by the Liverpool John Moores University misconduct panel. Writing in The Guardian, Lanre Bakare suggested that Cambridge took this stance because Arday's two loudest critics held controversial opinions on race. Routledge confirmed that it still intended to publish Arday's book, Considering Racialised Contexts in Education, in 2030.

Okundaye wrote that the instinct of many progressives was to defend Arday, especially because of Cofnas's role in publicising the allegations. The Black studies scholar Kehinde Andrews suggested that Arday had made mistakes but was not guilty of plagiarism, and described the criticisms as "a dedicated, co-ordinated smear campaign from the right, based on the premise that Black people should not be at Cambridge". The Runnymede Trust, for which Arday had been a trustee, also criticised what it termed "racialised, hyper-aggressive media scrutiny" of the sociologist.

Campaigning organisation the Good Law Project published an open letter stating that the allegations of plagiarism were "entirely false" and that "right-wing media have attempted to smear Professor Arday's reputation and undermine his career". It was signed by over 10,000 people, including Andrews, politicians Zack Polanski, John McDonnell, and Clive Lewis, activist Simon Woolley, trade union leader Daniel Kebede, actor Colin Salmon, photographer Misan Harriman, businesswoman and Master of Jesus College Sonita Alleyne, lawyer Shola Mos-Shogbamimu, research pharmacist Ijeoma Uchegbu, and autism researcher Simon Baron-Cohen. Several signatories subsequently had their names removed or distanced themselves from the letter as more allegations came to light, including Uchegbu, Alleyne, Kebede, and Baron-Cohen.

=== Academic investigation and resignation ===
On 5 August, following publication of The Guardian article, Cambridge University announced it had begun an investigation into Arday's qualifications and appointments. Jesus College also started an investigation. Later that day, Arday resigned from his professorship and fellowship. He said that this should not be "mistaken for an acceptance of the narratives that have surrounded me" and added that he wanted to be "present" for his family. Four days later, he also resigned as a publication director and trustee of the British Sociological Association.

After Arday's Cambridge resignation, it was reported that a joint letter, led by senior academics including Priyamvada Gopal, had begun circulating at the university demanding an independent investigation into Arday's appointment and suggesting that he had been employed by management as a quick fix to their perceived diversity issues. The letter expressed concern that the affair would discourage black academics from taking future jobs at Cambridge and had "the potential to set back the modest progress Cambridge has made in addressing historical underrepresentation". Among the almost 100 signatories were the physicist Suchitra Sebastian, sociologist Mónica Figueroa, literature scholar Clair Wills, logician Anuj Dawar and historian Nicholas Guyatt. On 12 August, the university's vice-chancellor, Deborah Prentice, announced that their investigation would be conducted by senior Cambridge employees alongside external academics.

Gopal told The Guardian that Cambridge University bore some responsibility for the "grotesque racism which this whole business has unleashed" and for the harm done to Arday, to black academics more widely, and to the field of critical race studies. Gopal and Guyatt stressed to Channel 4 News that Arday's hiring was an anomaly and not reflective of wider processes at Cambridge. Gopal said that "American-style affirmative action ... simply doesn't exist" at Cambridge.

Following Cambridge's announcement, the University of Glasgow announced that it would review its 2022 decision to hire Arday, while Queen's University Belfast began investigating a 2021 article that Arday had co-written with several of its employees.

=== Possible implications for academia ===
The Guardian reported interviewing academics who believed that "fallout from the row could [...] set the study of race in Britain back 20 years". In that same newspaper, journalist and author Afua Hirsch wrote that many black sociologists had been privately "voicing concerns about [Arday's work] for a while" but had chosen not to express this publicly out of fear that Arday would not be "treated fairly" and that it would damage public views of black scholars more widely. Paul Gilroy, a sociologist at University College London, stated his concern that the controversy would overshadow cuts being made to humanities programmes, and that "the unthinking culture warriors who have supported [Arday] unconditionally share responsibility with his racist critics for making life harder for Black academics and dragging UK higher education deeper into the mire".

The New Statesman commented that Arday was an example of a perceived decline in academic standards, and that the scandal gave ammunition to those who regard the sociology of education and related fields as "low-value pseudo-science". In The Guardian, Okundaye commented that the affair played into issues of Britain's culture wars, in particular the view held by some that academic standards have been lowered due to "woke" beliefs and EDI policies. Alan Lester, professor of historical geography at the University of Sussex, added that the controversy had provided "far-right racists" with "a weapon that they will wield egregiously". Various right-wing figures suggested that Arday's appointment was the result of EDI policies. Former Conservative MP Jacob Rees-Mogg stated that the incident revealed how Cambridge had "drunk the D.E.I. Kool-Aid". In The Daily Telegraph, Tomiwa Owolade argued that it demonstrated the "deep rot within our education system", based on a "different set of standards" for "working-class and black pupils" within universities.

The journalist and author Nesrine Malik told The Guardian that it was hard "not to feel this is about all of us" black people, resulting in feeling that black people were likely to be seen as exaggerating their credentials, or that black people had been given preferential treatment and used by liberal institutions to seem more diverse.

== Memoir ==
Arday's memoir, Great and Unfortunate Things, co-written with Eve Claxton, was released in the US on 11 August and the UK on 27 August 2026. The publishers, Simon & Schuster, described it as a story of "improbable triumphs". Arday said he had been paid an advance of "1.4 million" for the book, although he did not specify the currency. Prior to Arday's resignation, the publishers confirmed that they had not changed their plans to launch the book, although three promotional appearances by Arday were cancelled.

The Atlantic reported that the memoir differed significantly from earlier public accounts of Arday's life and from details given in his proposal for the book. The proposal included a car accident in his teens, after which he spent several months on life support in a coma, and testicular cancer at 34. A review in The Times described the memoir as "mawkish, self-aggrandising and hard to believe" and said that "extraordinary claims are made with no supporting evidence". The Washington Free Beacon said there were similarities between the memoir's contents and films and television shows that Arday had publicly admired.

US print sales for its first five days were 433.

== Personal life ==
Arday married Debbie McKenzie, a teacher, in 2014. In his memoir, he said that it was McKenzie, at the time his girlfriend, who helped him read and write. They had two children together. They separated in 2019.

After his death, Arday's family described him as gentle and said that he "always wanted to see the best in everyone".

== Death and aftermath ==
Cambridge professor Simon Baron-Cohen, an autism researcher and Arday's friend, said he observed Arday's mental health deteriorate in the days before his death and that Arday "felt he couldn't go on".

Arday was found dead in his home in Battersea on 14 August 2026. An inquest into Arday's death opened on 26 August 2026 at London Inner South Coroner's Court. The senior coroner, Julian Morris, said that the London Ambulance Service and Metropolitan Police had attended the address after Arday was found unresponsive, that he had been pronounced dead at the scene despite attempts at resuscitation, and that the police had said the scene was not suspicious. Morris said that initial investigations had given him "reason to suspect that Professor Arday died an unnatural death", and that an investigation was therefore being opened.

=== Reactions ===
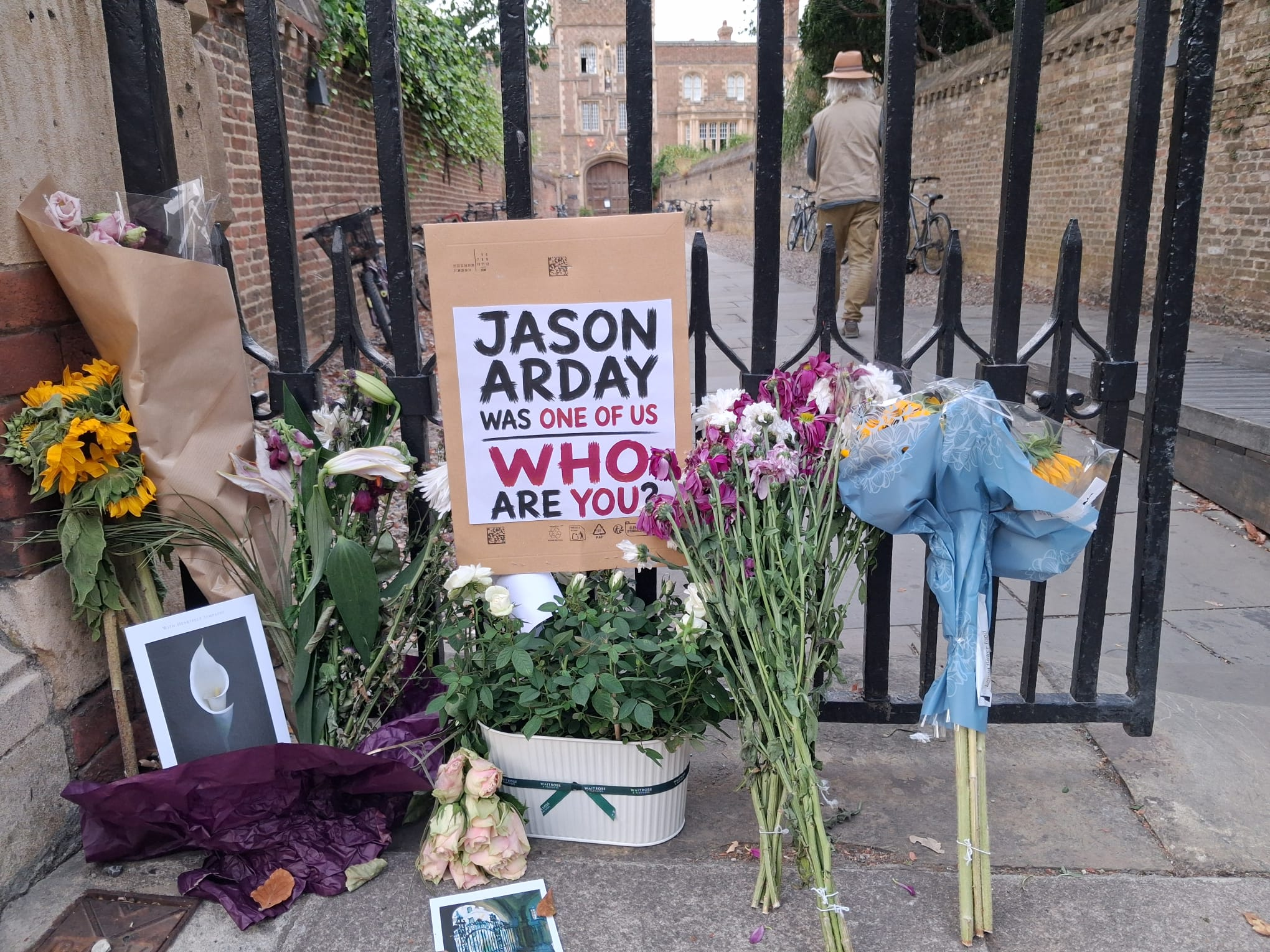
Floral tributes to Jason Arday at Jesus College, Cambridge, on 17 August 2026

Arday's family stated that "Jason was subjected to a campaign of sustained abuse for the more than three years since he accepted the role of professor at Cambridge University by those who would leave no stone unturned in their quest to undermine him" and that it had become too much for him to bear. Political activist Patrick Vernon established a fundraiser for Arday's family, raising over £200,000. Arday's postdoctoral students organised a vigil in Cambridge attended by over 200 people, while another, organised by Stand Up to Racism in central London, attracted several thousand.

Describing Arday's death as "a tragedy on so many levels", Prime Minister Andy Burnham called for a "moment of reflection" and encouraged people not to rush to judgement. Education Secretary Lucy Powell said she felt deeply shocked and saddened by Arday's death, and urged respect for his family's grief. The universities of Cambridge and Glasgow expressed deep sadness and offered their condolences to Arday's family. Cambridge defended their handling of the situation, stating that they had provided Arday with "extensive mental health support and security measures" following his resignation. Media debates regarding Arday's statements continued following his death.

On 19 August, Ghent University suspended Nathan Cofnas, the academic who had initially published the plagiarism accusations, pending a preliminary disciplinary investigation. The suspension was partially lifted nine days later.

=== Media criticism ===
Some academics, journalists, and activists criticised the extent of media scrutiny of Arday, arguing that while there were legitimate questions about his career, coverage was disproportionate to that such academic investigations normally receive, possibly due to his race, and possibly contributing to his death.

The Chancellor of the University of Cambridge, Chris Smith, said that, while it was important for claims of plagiarism in academia to be "rigorously investigated", the atmosphere around Arday had become a "racist feeding frenzy". Trade union leader Daniel Kebede criticised what he called a "public and brutal takedown" that unleashed a "tirade of racism". Jo Grady, general secretary of the University and College Union, denounced "the level of harassment [Arday] suffered and the racism he was subjected to". The Mayor of London, Sadiq Khan, said that Arday had been the victim of an "unacceptable public hounding" and a "pernicious public shaming". Several commentators likened Arday's treatment to lynching, including in The Emancipator, Socialist Worker, Inside Higher Ed, and The Irish News.

The National Union of Journalists stated that, although there were "legitimate concerns over aspects" of the Arday coverage, it condemned "attacks against individual journalists – including Black journalists – who have been targeted with threats, harassment or racial slurs following Arday's death."

Simon Woolley, Principal of Homerton College, Cambridge and Arday's former mentor, called for an investigation into the media's handling of the accusations. Jolyon Maugham of the Good Law Project questioned whether media organisations had carried out risk assessments when pursuing the story and the public interest in continuing to investigate him after he resigned as a professor, and a Good Law Project petition calling for a public inquiry into the media coverage around Arday was signed by over 90,000 people, including public figures. By 18 August, 188,000 complaints had been sent to the UK's media regulator, the Independent Press Standards Organisation (IPSO), via the one click mechanism of Newscord; IPSO noted that it would only accept those which could be verified as having been sent by humans. A cross-party group of 53 MPs and peers, organized by Labour MP Afzal Khan, wrote to IPSO requesting an inquiry into the media scrutiny surrounding Arday prior to his death. The signatories argued that the coverage exceeded legitimate public-interest reporting and that Arday's race was a key factor in the volume and hostile tone of the press attention.

The number of articles by the British media on Arday has been tallied by independent organisations for various periods. An NLA ClipShare search by The Observer found 210 articles published by seven major British newspapers over the last year. An analysis of the coverage published in The Conversation using LexisNexis data showed 242 substantive print articles about Arday from 25 July to 20 August, with The Times leading, with 53 articles.

Tyler Austin Harper, writing in The Atlantic, argued that competing accounts of Arday's career contained elements of truth: that race had played a role in the enthusiasm surrounding his appointment, but also in the intense scrutiny surrounding the allegations against him. The New York Times stated that the press scrutiny was "as much about Cambridge" as it was about Arday himself. Although agreeing that Arday faced racism, an editorial in The Guardian defended its reporting: "It was right for the Guardian to publish its investigation, and it is wrong that the journalists who did their job responsibly are now being subjected to an onslaught of abuse." Graeme Wood in The Atlantic argued that "The press's obsession was in proportion with the outlandishness of the lies told by Arday and on his behalf, and with public interest in the failures they revealed."

In The Telegraph, Charles Moore wrote that responsibility for Arday's death lay with Cambridge for initially dismissing allegations rather than investigating them in a timely manner, while Sarah Ditum of The Times said that Arday was a legitimate subject because of his previously relatively high media profile and the consequences for others of his academic misconduct. She acknowledged that focus on the story may have been intensified by its occurring in summer's silly season when Parliament is in recess and there are fewer newsworthy events. Helen Lewis in The Atlantic noted the impact on the volume of coverage of competition between media outlets and the large number of claims being scrutinised and challenged, particularly when they were denied or amended. Conservative party leader Kemi Badenoch said "I don't think that Jason Arday's death should be used as a way to bring about a muzzling of the press."

== Selected works ==
=== Books ===
- Arday, Jason; Mirza, Heidi Safia, eds. (2018). Dismantling Race in Higher Education: Racism, Whiteness and Decolonising the Academy. Cham: Palgrave Macmillan. ISBN 978-3-319-60260-8.
- ——— (2020). Cool Britannia and Multi-Ethnic Britain: Uncorking the Champagne Supernova. Abingdon, Oxon., and New York, New York: Routledge. ISBN 978-1-138-21740-9.
- Arday, Jason; Claxton, Eve (2026). Great and Unfortunate Things: A Memoir. Simon & Schuster. ISBN 978-1-6680-8557-8.

=== Journal articles ===
- Arday, Jason (13 October 2018). "Understanding mental health: What are the issues for black and ethnic minority students at university?". Social Sciences. 7 (10) 196. doi:10.3390/socsci7100196. Revised version (correction): Arday, Jason (6 December 2023). "Correction: Arday, Jason (2018). Understanding mental health: What are the issues for Black and ethnic minority students at university? Social Sciences 7: 196". Social Science. 12 (12) 672. doi:10.3390/socsci12120672.
- ———; Zoe Belluigi, Dina; Thomas, Dave (2020). "Attempting to break the chain: Reimaging inclusive pedagogy and decolonising the curriculum within the academy". Educational Philosophy and Theory. 53 (3): 298–313. doi:10.1080/00131857.2020.1773257.
- ———; Branchu, Charlotte; Boliver, Vikki (2022). "State of the Art: What Do We Know About Black and Minority Ethnic (BAME) Participation in UK Higher Education?". Social Policy and Society. 21 (1): 12–25. doi:10.1017/S1474746421000579.
- ——— (2022). "No one can see me cry: understanding mental health issues for Black and minority ethnic staff in higher education". Higher Education. 83 (1): 79–102. doi:10.1007/s10734-020-00636-w.
