= Heidi Safia Mirza =

British academic (born 1958)

- Born: 1958 (age 67–68); UK
- Education: University of East Anglia; Goldsmiths, University of London
- Occupation: Academic
- Notable work: Young, Female and Black (1992); Black British Feminism (1997); Tackling the Roots of Racism: Lessons for Success (2005)

Heidi Safia Mirza (born 1958) is a British academic, who is Professor of Race, Faith and Culture at Goldsmiths, University of London, Professor Emerita in Equalities Studies at the UCL Institute of Education, and visiting professor in Social Policy at the London School of Economics (LSE). She has done pioneering research on race, gender and identity in education, multiculturalism, Islamophobia and gendered violence, and was one of the first black women professors in Britain.

Mirza is author and editor of several notable books, including Young, Female and Black (1992), Black British Feminism (1997), Tackling the Roots of Racism: Lessons for Success (2005), Race Gender and Educational Desire: Why Black Women Succeed and Fail (2009), Black and Postcolonial Feminisms in New Times (2012), and Respecting Difference: Race, Faith, and Culture for Teacher Educators (2012).

== Biography ==
=== Early years and education ===
Heidi Safia Mirza was born in Britain to a Trinidadian father and an Austrian mother, and at the age of four she moved with her parents to Trinidad. She returned to England in 1973, when she was 16, attending school in Brixton, and has written of the shock of encountering racist strife in 1970s England after her relatively sheltered experience of growing up in rural Trinidad and attending a secondary school founded by her grandmother: "You don't question your right to exist, but that is what happens when you become a racialized 'other.'" In 1977, she went to do Development Studies the University of East Anglia, where in her first year she met and married her husband; she was pregnant with their daughter when she sat her final exams.

She studied for a PhD at Goldsmiths, University of London, and her thesis became her first book, Young, Female and Black (1992), about second-generation Caribbean young women in British comprehensive schools and "the interplay between career choices, aspirations and educational structures", which she has described as "in effect, both an academic and an autobiographical journey".

=== Career ===
Mirza's academic career has encompassed lecturing and teaching in the US at Brown University, then at South Bank University for nine years, and at Middlesex University (1998), where she became the UK's first Chair in Racial Equality Studies. She is currently Professor of Race, Faith and Culture at Goldsmiths, Professor Emerita in Equalities Studies at the UCL Institute of Education, and visiting professor in Social Policy at the London School of Economics (LSE).

Mirza has published widely on race, gender, Black British feminisms, multiculturalism, postcolonial theory and educational inequalities, her books including Young, Female and Black (1992), Black British Feminism (1997), Tackling the Roots of Racism: Lessons for Success (2005), Race Gender and Educational Desire: Why Black Women Succeed and Fail (2009), Black and Postcolonial Feminisms in New Times (2012), and Respecting Difference: Race, Faith, and Culture for Teacher Educators (2012). She co-authored the OfSTED school government inspection report Educational Inequality: Mapping Race, Class, and Gender.

She advises English Heritage on diversity, and established the Runnymede Collection at the Black Cultural Archives.

== Honours and recognition ==
In 2014, Mirza won the Media Diversified Eight Women award, which celebrates the achievements of women of colour in the UK.

In 2015, in recognition of her achievements, she gave the 50th Anniversary Martin Luther King Lecture with Doreen Lawrence in St Paul's Cathedral.

In 2020, Mirza featured in the Phenomenal Women exhibition at London's Southbank Centre celebrating the 35 Black professors at UK universities.

== Bibliography ==
=== Books ===
- Young, Female and Black, London: Routledge, 1992. ISBN 978-0415067058
- Black British Feminism: A Reader, London: Routledge, 1997. ISBN 978-0415152891
- Race, Gender and Educational Desire: Why Black Women Succeed and Fail, London: Routledge, 2009. ISBN 978-0415448765
- "'A Second Skin': Embodied Intersectionality, Transnationalism and Narratives of Identity and Belonging among Muslim Women in Britain". Women's Studies International Forum 36: 5–16, 2013.
- With Bhavnani, R., and V. Meetoo, Tackling the Roots of Racism, Lessons for Success, Bristol: Policy Press, 2005. ISBN 978-1861347749
- With Joseph, C. Black and Postcolonial Feminisms in New Times: Researching Educational Inequalities, London: Routledge, 2010. ISBN 978-0415633956
- Respecting Difference: Race, Faith, and Culture for Teacher Educators, IOE Press, 2012. ISBN 978-0854738878
- Co-edited with Jason Arday, Dismantling Race in Higher Education: Racism, whiteness and decolonising the academy, Palgrave MacMillan, 2019.

=== Selected articles ===
- With Yasmin Gunaratnam, "'The Branch on which I sit': Heidi Safia Mirza in conversation with Yasmin Gunaratnam", Feminist Review, 108, 2014, pp. 125–133. ISSN 0141-7789.
- "'A second skin’: Embodied intersectionality, transnationalism and narratives of identity and belonging among Muslim women in Britain", Women's Studies International Forum, 36, 2013, pp. 5–15. ISSN 0277-5395.
- "Plotting a History: Black and postcolonial feminisms in ‘new times’", Race Ethnicity and Education, 12(1), 2009, pp. 1–10. ISSN 1361-3324.
- "'The Golden Fleece': The Windrush quest for educational desire". Windrush Stories, British Library, 8 October 2018.
