= Jennifer Rexford =

American computer scientist

Provost of Princeton University
- Incumbent
- Assumed office March 13, 2023
- Preceded by: Deborah Prentice

Personal details
- Education: Princeton University (BS); University of Michigan (MS, PhD)
- Occupation: Computer scientist
- Website: https://www.cs.princeton.edu/~jrex/

Jennifer Rexford is an American computer scientist who is currently the Provost, Gordon Y. S. Wu Professor in Engineering, Professor of Computer Science, and formerly the Chair of the Department of Computer Science at Princeton University. Her research focuses on analysis of computer networks, and in particular network routing, performance measurement, and network management.

== Life and career ==
Rexford did her undergraduate studies at Princeton, earning a bachelor's degree in electrical engineering in 1991, and then moved to the University of Michigan for graduate studies in computer science and engineering, earning a master's degree in 1993 and a doctorate in 1996. Her thesis, titled "Tailoring router architectures to performance requirements in cut-through networks", was supervised by Kang G. Shin. She worked at Bell Labs for two summers as a graduate student, and then returned to what had since become AT&T Labs, working there from 1996 to 2005, when she joined the Princeton faculty.

Rexford won the ACM Grace Murray Hopper Award (the award goes to a computer professional who makes a single, significant technical or service contribution at or before age 35) in 2005, for her work on introducing network routing subject to the different business interests of the operators of different subnetworks into Border Gateway Protocol. In 2016, Rexford was named the recipient of the ACM Athena Lecturer award, which recognizes women who have made fundamental contributions to computer science. She became a fellow of the ACM in 2008, and a fellow of the American Academy of Arts and Sciences in 2013. Rexford was elected a member of the National Academy of Engineering in 2014 for contributions to the operational stability of large computer networks. She was also elected a member of the National Academy of Sciences in 2020.

== See also ==
- Frenetic (programming language)

Academic offices
Preceded by Deborah Prentice	Provost of Princeton University; 2023-present	Incumbent
