= Tim Hilton =

British journalist (1941–2024)

Tim Hilton (7 July 1941 - 6 January 2024) was a British journalist and author. Among other works, he wrote an acclaimed two volume biography of John Ruskin.

Hilton's mother was Margaret (nee Palmer), and his father was Rodney Hilton, son of a weaver John James Hilton from Middleton; Rodney's mother was also a weaver.

Rodney won a scholarship from Manchester Grammar School to attend Balliol College, Oxford, and Rodney and Margaret met at Oxford in the 1930s. Rodney went on to serve in the Second World War. After the War both parents became academics at the University of Birmingham. Tim was born in Birmingham, and the family lived at 90 Bristol Road.

Rodney was a founder member of the Communist Party Historians Group and he and Margaret hosted weekly meetings of the local Communist Party branch between 1948 and 1956. Even as a boy, Hilton himself was encouraged to take part in the discussions and at the end of the meeting to pour out beer for the comrades after the business was finished. The experience gave him a dislike of formal meetings of any kind that persisted throughout his life.

Hilton described Rodney and Margaret as being mismatched and, having grown apart during the War, they divorced in the 1950s. Hilton was taken into care by Birmingham City Council. He went to school at Tettenhall College in Wolverhampton, then to Aston Technical College (now Birmingham City University) and hoped to go to art school. Instead he took up a place at his father's Oxford college, Balliol, where he studied English (1961-64). After Oxford he started a PhD at the Courtauld Institute whose then Director was Anthony Blunt. After two years, he became a freelance writer and critic, and taught in art schools including Birmingham, Norwich and St Martin's. He embraced the bohemian world of Fitzrovia, but also worked long hours in the library of the British Museum. His first published book was The Pre-Raphaelites (1970) published by Thames and Hudson in their distinctive black-covered World of Art Library series.

In 1984 he married Alexandra Pringle and moved from Oxford to Hampstead; a son, Daniel, was born in 1986. Hilton worked as a journalist for The Guardian and then The Independent on Sunday. Pringle left him in 1999 and they divorced in 2000. He later set up home in Beccles with architectural historian Lynda Fairbairn and they married in 2005.

By Hilton's account, Rodney and Margaret had a holiday in France when he was 11, possibly trying to revive their failing marriage, and left Hilton to stay with his grandparents in Raynes Park. In the garage behind the grandparents' Bentley, Hilton discovered a bicycle. He instinctively taught himself to ride, regarding himself as a natural, and rode off towards the Kingston by-pass. He became enamoured by cycling and, returning home, persuaded his parents to buy him a bicycle. It had been built up from All Spare Parts by a member of a cycling club, and was known as an ASP.

He was befriended by Alfred Burman, a cyclist who was a member of both the Birmingham branch of the Cyclists' Touring Club and the Warwickshire Road Club. Hilton enjoyed the camaraderie among cyclists and the absence of a political agenda, starkly different from the weekly communist meetings held at his home. It was, as he wrote later, a 'golden age' for cycling - and in 2004 he published a delightful book about British and Continental cycling, largely dealing with the postwar period up to the 1960s. He himself, aged 62, was riding more than 10,000 miles a year, and continued to ride until February 2023 when he was 81.

Hilton was elected a Fellow of the Royal Society of Literature in 1993.

== Books ==
- The Pre-Raphaelites, London: Thames and Hudson, 1970
- Keats and his world, London: Thames and Hudson, 1971
- Picasso, London: Thames and Hudson, 1975
- John Ruskin: The Early Years, Yale University Press: New Haven, Connecticut, 1985
- John Ruskin: The Later Years, Yale University Press: New Haven, Connecticut, 2000
- One More Kilometre And We’re in the Showers, London: HarperCollins, 2004
