= Jeremy Adelman =

Canadian historian (born 1960)

Jeremy Adelman FBA
- Born: 1960 (age 65–66)

Academic background
- Education: University of Toronto (BA); London School of Economics (MSc); St. Antony's College, Oxford (DPhil)

Academic work
- Discipline: History
- Institutions: University of Essex; Princeton University; University of Cambridge; Darwin College, Cambridge

Jeremy Adelman, FBA (born 1960) is a Canadian historian who was the Henry Charles Lea Professor of History at Princeton University from 2014 to 2023, before moving to the University of Cambridge, UK when his wife became its vice-chancelor. He is the director of the Global History Lab at the Centre for Research in the Arts, Social Sciences and Humanities (CRASSH) at Cambridge. Previously, he served as the director of the Council for International Teaching and Research, the director of the Program in Latin American Studies and chair of the History Department at Princeton. His areas of scholarship include Latin American and global history.

== Education ==
Adelman obtained his B.A. in political economy from the University of Toronto in 1984, his M.Sc. in economic history from the London School of Economics in 1985, and his D.Phil. in modern history from the University of Oxford in 1989. At Oxford, he was a member of St. Antony's College.

== Career ==
He has taught at the University of Oxford and the University of Essex in England, the Instituto Torcuato di Tella in Argentina, and at Princeton since 1992, and has held visiting fellowships at the Institute for Advanced Study (Princeton) and the Institut d'études politiques (Paris), the École des hautes études en sciences sociales (Paris), and the Institute for Human Sciences (Vienna). His current initiatives include the formation of the Global History Collaborative with colleagues in Berlin, Paris, and Tokyo and the Global History Lab. Adelman's most recent book is The Capitalist Era: The Making -- and Unmaking -- of the Global Mind (2026, Princeton University Press). He is currently working on two books. The first is a history of Latin America since 1492. The other is a biography of the Indian thinker, Amartya Sen.

In 2023, Adelman retired from Princeton when his wife became the vice-chancelor of the University of Cambridge and relocated there together with the Global History Lab. In 2024, was elected to a fellowship at Darwin College. In 2025, he was elected to be a Fellow of the British Academy.

His awards include the John Simon Guggenheim Memorial Fellowship and the Frederick Burkhardt Fellowship of the American Council for Learned Societies.

Adelman is also committed to creating and supporting connected and inclusive learning in fractured societies. He has written and presented courses in global history on various platforms, Coursera, NovoEd, and EdX under the Global History Lab. The initiative branched in September 2016, in collaboration with colleagues at the University of Geneva, to outreach programs to refugees in Kenya, Jordan, Rwanda and Uganda. The GHL now integrates a full-year curriculum of three courses in global history, oral history and documentary methods, and supervised research projects for students worldwide. In 2020, it ceased to be a MOOC and became a network program shared across 25 institutions (universities, NGO's, foundations, and civic activist groups) in 23 countries. Tens of thousands of students have completed GHL courses from Vietnam, Bangladesh, and Germany to Colombia, Greece and Nigeria.

== Personal life ==
Adelman is married to Deborah Prentice, the vice-chancellor of the University of Cambridge; they have three children.

== Works ==
- Adelman, Jeremy (1994). Frontier development : land, labour, and capital on the wheatlands of Argentina and Canada, 1890-1914. Oxford: Oxford University Press.
- Republic of Capital: Buenos Aires and the Legal Transformation of the Atlantic World (Stanford University Press: Stanford, 1999) ISBN 978-0804746823 Winner, American Historical Association James A. Rawley Prize for the best book in Atlantic History
- Sovereignty and Revolution in the Iberian Atlantic (Princeton University Press: Princeton, 2006) ISBN 978-0691142777
- Co-authored, World Together, Worlds Apart: An Introduction to World History From the Beginnings of Humankind to the Present 7th Edition (New York: W. W. Norton, 2023) ISBN 978-0393925470
- Worldly Philosopher: The Odyssey of Albert O. Hirschman Princeton University Press, Princeton, NJ (2013) ISBN 9780691155678.
- El idealista prágmatico: La odisea de Alberto O. Hirschman. Ediciones Uniandes (March 1, 2017)ISBN 978-9587744927
- The Essential Hirschman (ed.). Princeton University Press 2015 ISBN 978-0691165677
- Colonial Legacies: The Problem of Persistence in Latin American History (ed.) Routledge 1999. ISBN 978-0415921534
- Co-edited with Stephen Aron, Trading Cultures: The Worlds of Western Merchants. (Brepols, 2001). ISBN 978-2503508764
- Los años del daguerrotipo: Primeras fotografías argentinas, 1843-1870. (with Miguel Angel Cuarterolo. Fundación Antorchas 1995. Spanish and English.ISBN 978-9509837058
- Essays in Argentine Labour History, 1870-1930 (ed.). Palgrave MacMillan 1992. ISBN 978-0333551844
- Empire and the Social Sciences: Global Histories of Knowledge (ed.). Bloomsbury 2019. ISBN 9781350102514
- Co-edited with Gyan Prakash, Inventing the Third World: In Search of Freedom for the Postwar Global South (ed.). Bloomsbury 2022. ISBN 9781350268159
- Co-edited with Andreas Eckert, Narratives, Nations, and Other World Products in the Making of Global History (ed.). Bloomsbury 2024. ISBN 9781350440982
- The Capitalist Era: The Making -- and Unmakming -- of the Global Mind. Princeton University Press, 2026. ISBN 9780691177021

=== Critical studies and reviews of Adelman's work ===
- Walsh, Adrian (September 2014). "Unorthodox economics : an intellectual biography of a prolific theorist". Australian Book Review. 364: 29–30. Reviews of Worldly philosopher and The essential Hirschman.
