= Southwark Coroner's Court =

English coroner's court in London

Coordinates: 51.501448°N 0.0908°W

Southwark Coroner's Court (officially London Inner South Coroner's Court) is an English coroner's court located at 1 Tennis Street in Southwark, London. It covers cases for the London boroughs of Greenwich, Lambeth, Lewisham and Southwark.

The court has handled some high-profile cases including the New Cross house fire (1981), when 13 young people died, and the 1989 inquests into the 51 people who died in the Marchioness disaster when a pleasure boat collided with a dredger on the River Thames.

== Building history ==
Before the late 19th century, inquests were often held in local pubs, vestry halls, or even the deceased's home—settings often criticised for being undignified. Purpose-built coroner's courts can be traced back to provisions in the Sanitary Act 1866 (permitting sanitary authorities to erect mortuaries and provide dedicated places for post-mortem examinations ordered by coroners) and to the Coroners Act of 1887. Between 1878 and 1915, 29 coroner’s courts were built in Greater London, many to designs by the London County Council Architects' Department. In 1892 the Department produced model plans, signed by Thomas Blashill, which were sent to authorities interested in erecting such buildings. The Southwark building at 1 Tennis Street dates from 1915.

The building is of brick, with stone dressings, gaving the required dignity while also disguising its purpose. It has a public entrance and a coroner's entrance, with a courtroom on the groundfloor accessed from a hallway. The Southwark courtroom features an additional door from the hallway to the public benches. Over time, the coroner's offices became cramped, and waiting rooms were converted into additional offices (1962-1964); the whole offices were rebuilt in the 1990s.

== Role and jurisdiction ==
Coroners in England and Wales are independent judicial officers responsible for investigating certain deaths. Their core duty, under the Coroners and Justice Act 2009, is to establish facts, the identity of the deceased and how, when, and where they died rather than to attribute blame; conclusions reached at an inquest must not be framed so as to determine criminal or civil liability against any named person. Where an investigation or inquest reveals a risk that future deaths could occur in similar circumstances, the coroner has a duty to issue a report known as a Prevention of Future Deaths (PFD) report to the relevant organisation, which must respond within 56 days.

A death must be reported to a coroner

- where the cause is unknown
- where it was violent or unnatural
- where it occurred in prison, police custody or another form of state detention
- where it occurred during or shortly after a medical procedure.

Not every death that comes to a coroner's attention results in a full inquest; many are resolved once medical evidence establishes a natural cause.

=== Jurisdiction ===
==== Hospitals ====
- Kings College Hospital
- University Hospital Lewisham (UHL)
- Guys & St Thomas'
- Queen Elizabeth Hospital, London
- Blackheath Hospital
- London Bridge Hospital

==== Prisons ====
- HM Prison Belmarsh
- HM Prison Brixton
- HM Prison Isis
- HM Prison Thameside

==== Mental health services ====
- Cygnet Mental Health Services
- Oxleas NHS Foundation Trust
- (SLAM) South London and Maudsley

== Impact and legal consequences of Southwark inquest conclusions ==
Southwark Coroner's Court has heard cases demonstrating that an inquest, while not a criminal trial, can produce findings with significant legal and policy consequences.

=== Death of Ella Adoo-Kissi-Debrah ===
Nine-year-old Ella Adoo-Kissi-Debrah, who lived near the South Circular Road in Lewisham, died in 2013 after having seizures for three years. An initial 2014 inquest concluded that acute respiratory failure and severe asthma had caused her death. Following a report that found a "real prospect that without unlawful levels of air pollution, Ella would not have died", the High Court quashed the original findings and ordered a fresh inquest, held under Article 2 of the Human Rights Act, which allowed the coroner to scrutinise the role of public bodies including Transport for London, the Mayor's office, and Lewisham Council.

In December 2020, Assistant Coroner Philip Barlow delivered a narrative conclusion finding that air pollution "made a material contribution" to Ella's death, noting that nitrogen dioxide levels near her home exceeded World Health Organization and European Union guidelines. She became the first person in the UK to have air pollution listed as a cause of death.

Beyond the conclusion itself, the coroner used his powers under the Coroners and Justice Act 2009 to issue a Prevention of Future Deaths report, in which he expressed concern about the lack of legally binding air quality targets, insufficient public information, and inadequate training for doctors. The case is widely cited as demonstrating how an inquest can extend beyond determining the facts of an individual death to prompting wider public health and policy scrutiny, and it directly informed subsequent campaigns for stricter air quality legislation in England.

=== Death of Lee Adams ===
A further example of the court's capacity to prompt wider accountability is the inquest into the death of Lee Adams, a 36-year-old man from Streatham, south London. Adams died on 24 July 2020 after taking an overdose of propranolol, roughly half an hour after placing 628 bets in just over an hour on the Virgin Games online betting platform, having lost almost his entire monthly pay. In November 2025, following an eight-day inquest, Senior Coroner Dr Julian Morris concluded that Adams's death had been caused by gambling disorder.

The inquest heard that Adams had won more than £90,000 gambling on Virgin Games in March 2020, money he initially intended to use to buy a house, but lost much of it within weeks and became increasingly distressed. Expert evidence from Professor David Forrest described his gambling activity in the months before his death as "exceptional" and "extreme," and stated that Virgin Games' operator, Gamesys Operations Ltd, should have intervened; a GP expert in gambling disorder, Professor Dame Clare Gerada, told the inquest that Adams's gambling had created a cycle of financial and emotional distress that contributed to his death. The coroner found that there had been missed opportunities by the operator, though he did not conclude that this had directly contributed to Adams's death.

The inquest also revealed that the Gambling Commission had previously identified failings in the operator's handling of Adams's case but had not shared this with his family, and had decided against separate regulatory action because Gamesys had already been fined £6 million in January 2024 for a range of failings in identifying and interacting with at-risk customers. Following the conclusion, the coroner issued a Prevention of Future Deaths report to the Royal College of General Practitioners, recommending that GPs be made aware of the toxicity risks of propranolol in overdose and be prompted to ask patients about gambling habits in the same way they ask about smoking and alcohol use.

The case has been cited by campaigners and Adams's family as evidence of gaps in how gambling-related deaths are investigated and in the accountability of gambling operators, and has drawn renewed calls for reform of gambling harm regulation.

== Presiding senior coroners ==
=== Gordon Davies (1960s–1982) ===
Davies served during the mid-20th century transition when the coroner's office moved away from more archaic practices toward modern forensic requirements.

=== Sir Montague Levine (1983–2004) ===
A legendary figure in the London coronial system, Levine presided over the court for over two decades and was the coroner responsible for the inquests into the Marchioness riverboat disaster (1989) and the murder of Stephen Lawrence.

=== Selena Lynch (1997–2004) ===
Selena Lynch served intermittently in lead roles between 2004 and 2010 and was a key judicial figure at the Tennis Street office during transition periods between permanent appointments.

=== John Charles Sampson (2005–2010) ===
John Charles Sampson (died 16 July 2010) was Coroner for Southwark in the 2000s. A solicitor and deacon, he served as coroner until his death, after which his successor Andrew Harris described him as "a beacon of humanity."

Sampson oversaw the pre-inquest hearings into the killing of Jean Charles de Menezes, a Brazilian electrician shot dead by Metropolitan Police officers at Stockwell tube station in July 2005 after being mistaken for a terrorist. He set 22 September 2007 as the date for the substantive inquest, appointing Sir Michael Wright QC to preside over the hearing, and confirmed the case would be heard at Southwark Coroner's Court due to constraints on venue availability. In 2006, he agreed to postpone the inquest until criminal proceedings against the Metropolitan Police had concluded.

As a death in custody requires a mandatory inquest before a jury, Sampson also presided over the inquest into Keith Cottingham, who died of a heart attack at HMP Belmarsh in October 2005 while awaiting trial for the 1984 murder of Barbara Harrold by parcel bomb. The jury recorded a verdict of natural causes.

=== Andrew Harris (2010–2023) ===
One of the most prominent coroners in modern London history, Harris oversaw the court during a period of intense public scrutiny, including the initial investigations into the 2017 and 2019 London Bridge attacks. Harris was known for his rigorous adherence to "Rule 43" (now PFD—Prevention of Future Deaths) reports, frequently challenging hospitals and local authorities to improve safety. He presided over the 2014 Arsema Dawit case, involving the stalking and murder of a 15-year-old girl, the Kevin Clarke "death in custody" inquest, often cited as a landmark case regarding the intersection of mental health, race, and police restraint, and the inquest into the death in Camberwell of Katrina Makunova.

=== Julian Morris (April 2024–present) ===
A former solicitor and medical doctor, Morris took over the role during a period of modernisation for the Southwark-based court. He previously served as an Assistant Coroner in the same jurisdiction as well as South London Coroners, providing a smooth transition. He handled an inquiry into the deaths of three babies who died in 2014 after being given contaminated intravenous food, an inquest into the death of an 8-day-old baby following failures at a South London birth centre, the 2024 death of Lacey May Brookman which highlighted a specific clinical "blind spot" in emergency paediatrics and the Natasha Hill inquest (2026).
