= Sarah Ditum =

English columnist

Sarah Ditum (née Webster; born 1980/1981) is an English columnist and author whose work has appeared in publications including The Guardian, New Statesman, The Times, and UnHerd. Ditum's writing has covered issues including violence against women, gender identity, parenting, British parliamentary politics and cancel culture. She also writes book reviews. Her book Toxic: Women, Fame and The Noughties, about misogyny in celebrity culture during the 2000s, was published by Fleet in 2023.

Ditum has been criticised for her views on transgender issues, which she has expressed on media platforms such as a 2018 televised panel debate hosted as part of the Genderquake season of programming on a Channel 4, appearing alongside Germaine Greer, Munroe Bergdorf and Caitlyn Jenner. In 2019, Ditum authored an article for The Stage expressing her view that The Old Vic's introduction of unisex customer toilets is harmful to women, which was later removed from the publication's website following a backlash. Speaking to Press Gazette on the incident, Ditum stated: "The Stage pulled it (and the companion piece) in response to complaints about me, without forewarning me, thereby giving credence to false accusations against me – but more importantly, denying coverage to a fundamental matter of women's access to public space."

== Personal life ==
Ditum grew up in Rutland; her father was a brewer and her mother a teacher. She identifies as bisexual. She was born Sarah Webster, but wrote in 2012 that when she married her husband, she took his surname "Ditum" to improve her name's search engine optimization results, as there was already another writer with the name Sarah Webster. She is based in Bath.
