= ELearning Africa =

eLearning Africa is a three-day annual international conference on ICT-enhanced education, training and skills development in Africa which is organised by ICWE GMBH. Each year the event is hosted and co-organised by a different African government. It has been opened on previous occasions by presidents, Vice presidents and Prime Ministers of several African countries including Hage Geingob, Abdoulaye Wade, George Kunda, Edward Ssekandi, Pascal Koupaki, Mohamed Gharib Bilal and Debretsion Gebremichael. This pan-African conference focuses on the use of ICT and it tools to support education, training, skills and knowledge sharing across all sectors of Africa, enhancing Sustainable Development Goals across the continent and enabling participants to develop multinational and cross-industry contacts and partnerships, as well as to build up their expertise and abilities.

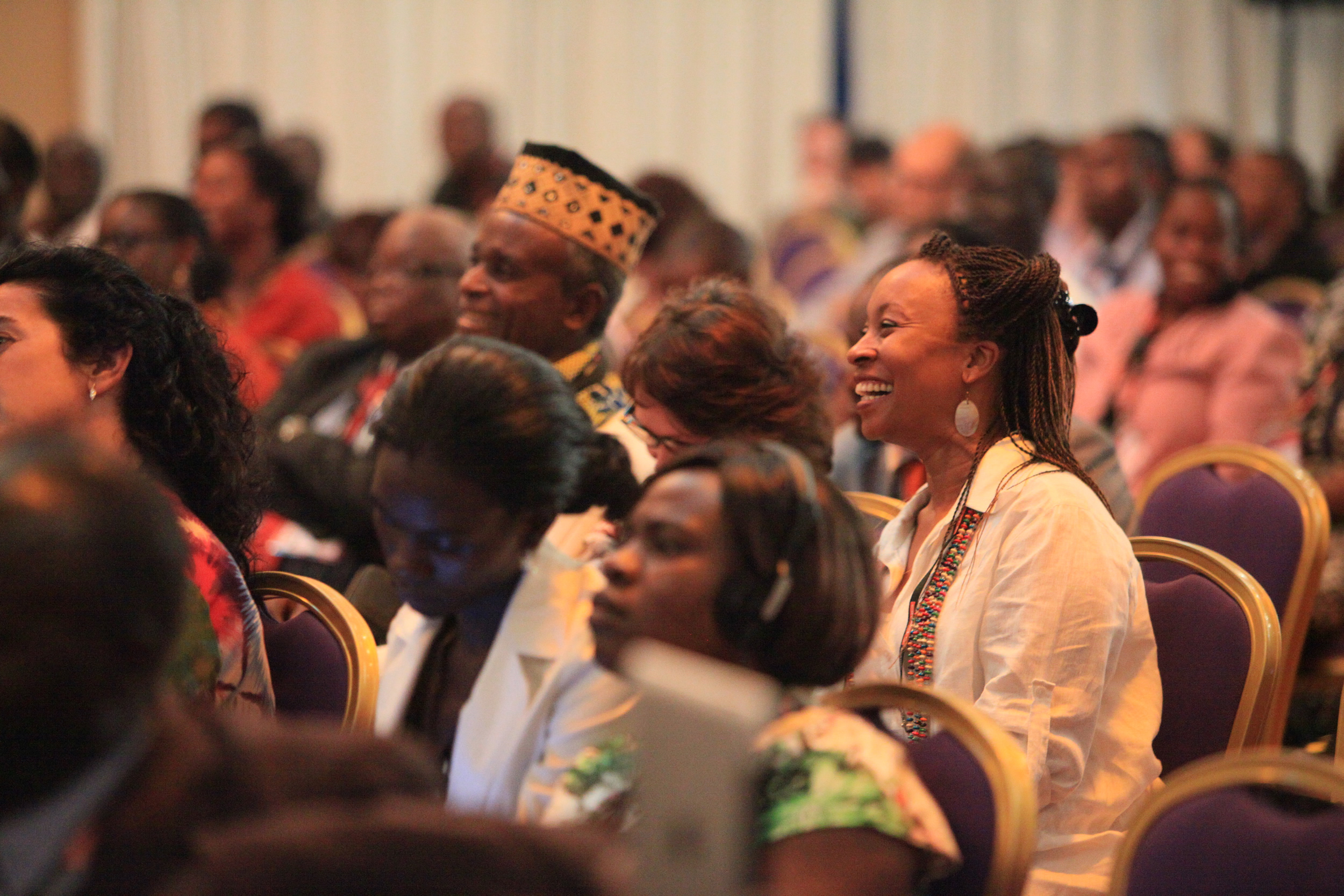
The audience enjoying the eLearning Africa 2014 Debate in Kampala, Uganda

The conference series was inaugurated at UNCC in Addis Ababa, Ethiopia in 2006 and has since visited Kenya, Ghana, Senegal, Zambia, Tanzania, Benin, Namibia, Uganda, Ethiopia, Egypt and Mauritius. Some of the Keynote speakers at the 2016 conference included Ismail Serageldin, Thierry Zomahoun, Günter Nooke, Toyosi Akerele-Ogunsiji and Toby Shapshak. eLearning Africa 2018 will be held from 26 – 28 September, 2018 at the Kigali Convention Centre located in Kigali, Rwanda.

== Participants ==
Delegates are from the education, business and government sectors.

Over 12 consecutive years, eLearning Africa has hosted 16,228 participants from more than 100 countries, with over 85% coming from the African continent in 12 different locations (Ethiopia, Kenya, Ghana, Senegal, Zambia, Tanzania, Benin, Namibia, Uganda, Ethiopia for the 10th anniversary, Egypt, Mauritius and Rwanda). More than 3,300 speakers have addressed the conference about every aspect of technology-enhanced education and skills development.

With a population of 1.4 billion people, 41 percent of which are under the age of 15, the African continent is the hub for development in using ICT to expand access to learning and skills acquisition, as well as to improve the quality of learning and teaching. ICT supported learning has a widespread impact across education, training and professional development, with governments and ministries throughout the continent investing resources in support of IT development in schools and skills training.

== Partners and sponsors ==
eLearning Africa has previously partnered with organisations such as the African Union, ECOWAS, GIZ, UNECA, UNESCO-UNEVOC and the African Development Bank and the conference has been sponsored on different occasions by companies such as Microsoft, Google, Intel and Nokia.

== Programme ==
The three-day conference is held in English and French. It includes three Plenary sessions and a Plenary debate, presenting the experiences, research, best practices, thinking and expertise that make up the complex picture of ICT for education, training and skills development in Africa today. On the second and third days of the conference, more than 200 speakers in around sixty-four smaller breakout sessions give presentations exploring further issues in Africa such as access to learning and vocational training, equality and quality in education, skills and employability, health, literacy and governance. The sessions take a variety of different forms including Applied Practice, Discovery Demo, Learning Cafés and Knowledge Exchange sessions. In addition to the main programme, a number of special events take place alongside the conference, such as hackathons, product launches, sponsored workshops and best practice showcases. An exhibition is held throughout the conference in which exhibitors showcase their products and services and network with the conference delegates.

== Ministerial Round table ==
African Ministers and high-level ministerial representatives attend the Ministerial Round Table (MRT) discussions which take place parallel to the conference before the Opening Plenary on the first day. The MRT discussions are a closed meeting on ICT for development, education and training and are held under a different theme each year.

== The eLearning Africa Report ==
The eLearning Africa Report provides an annual overview of the state of eLearning in Africa and considers the impact technology is having on education and development throughout the continent. The report includes surveys and country guides as well as features, news and opinion pieces from a variety of authors. The report is free to download and is published every year around the time of the eLearning Africa conference.

In addition to this, an e-newsletter is delivered to a database of more than 40,000 international readers, sharing the latest news, perspectives and trends in ICT for development and learning in Africa.
