= Centre for Research in the Arts, Social Sciences and Humanities =

Academic institution in Cambridge, United Kingdom

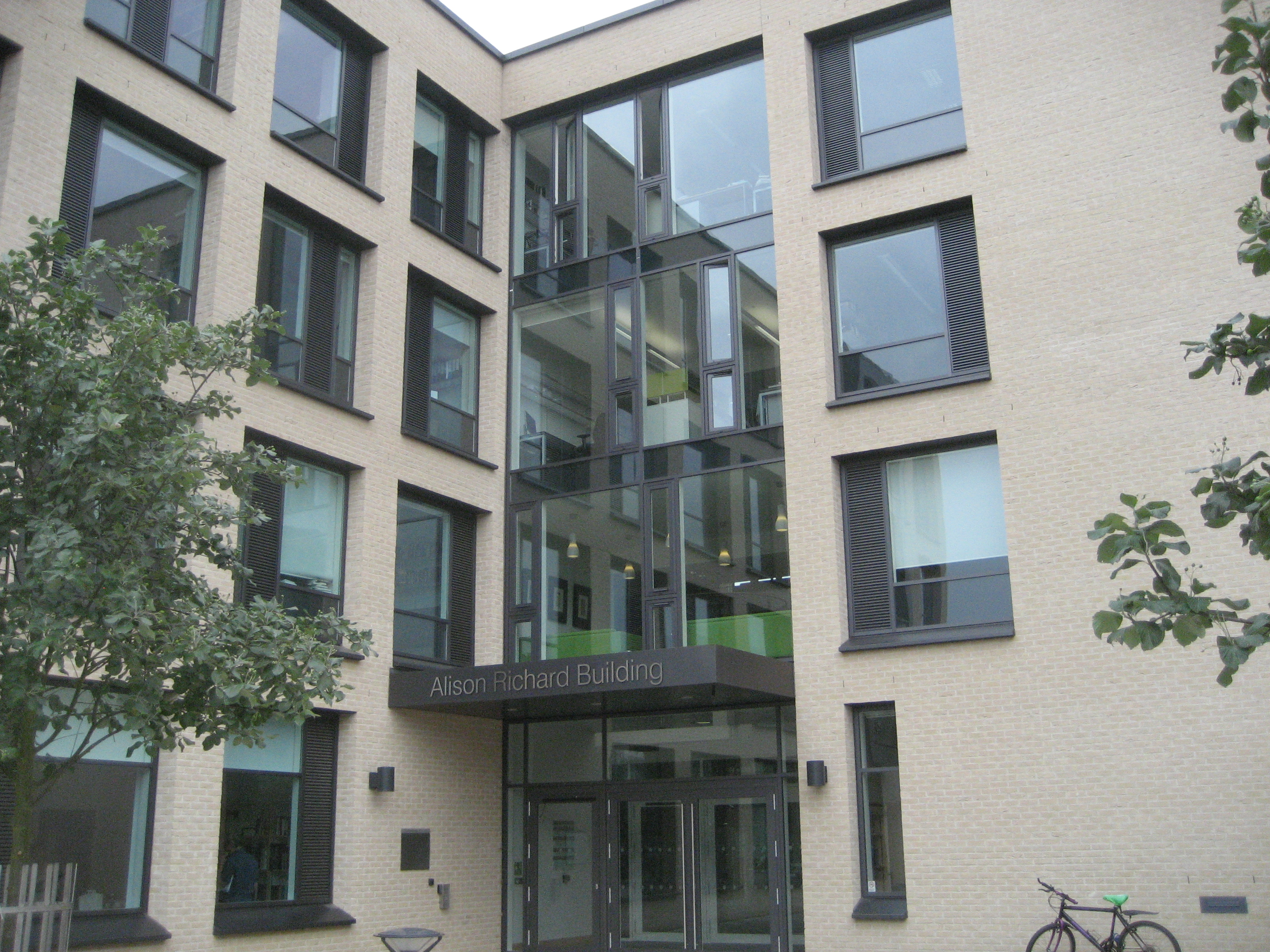
- Alison Richard Building, Sidgwick Site, University of Cambridge
- Established: 2001
- Affiliations: University of Cambridge
- Director: Joanna Page
- Location: Alison Richard Building, 7 West Road, Cambridge, England
- Campus: Sidgwick Site, Cambridge
- Website: www.crassh.cam.ac.uk

The Centre for Research in the Arts, Social Sciences and Humanities (CRASSH) is an interdisciplinary research centre within the University of Cambridge. Founded in 2001, CRASSH came into being as a way to create interdisciplinary dialogue across the University’s many faculties and departments in the arts, social sciences, and humanities, as well as to build bridges with scientific subjects.

== Directors ==
- Ian Donaldson, 2001–2003
- Ludmilla Jordanova, 2003–2005
- Mary Jacobus, 2005–2011
- Andrew Webber (Sabbatical Director), 2009–2010
- Simon Goldhill, 2011–2018
- Tim Lewens (Deputy Director), 2014–2017
- Jan-Melissa Schramm (Deputy Director), 2017–2019
- Steven Connor, 2018–2022
- Joanna Page, 2022–present
- Stuart Hogarth (Deputy Director), 2023–2026
- Rebecca Anne Barr (Deputy Director), 2026-present

== Management Committee ==
For the current CRASSH Management Committee, please visit the Governance page on the official website.

== Research projects ==
CRASSH is and was home to numerous major, long-term research projects and centres.

Current projects

- Minderoo Centre for Technology and Democracy
  - Minderoo Centre is primarily funded by Minderoo Foundation which is primarily funded by Andrew Forrest, Chairman of Fortescue
- Cambridge Digital Humanities
- The University of Cambridge Centre for Geopolitics
- Global History Lab
- Roam Within
- Nasawe’sx ya’yu’cenxi – Weaving Our Own Justice

Past projects

- Centre for the Study of Existential Risk (now a spin-off centre)
- Leverhulme Centre for the Future of Intelligence (now a spin-off centre)
- Beyond the Cold War: Toward a Community of Asia
- Crossroads of Knowledge in Early Modern England: The Place of Literature
- Expertise Under Pressure
- Genius Before Romanticism: Ingenuity in Early Modern Art and Science
- Making Visible: The Visual and Graphic Practices of the Early Royal Society
- Qualitative and Quantitative Social Science: Unifying the Logic of Causal Inference?
- Bible and Antiquity in 19th Century Culture
- China in a Global World War II
- The Concept Lab
- Conspiracy and Democracy
- Conversions
- The History of Cross-Cultural Comparatism
- Limits of the Numerical
- Seeing Things: Early Modern Visual and Material Culture
- Technology and Democracy
- Visual Representations of the Third Plague Pandemic
- Centre for Global Knowledge Studies
- Centre for the Humanities and Social Change, Cambridge
- Giving Voice to Digital Democracies: The Social Impact of Artificially Intelligent Communications Technology
- The Global as ARTEFACT: Understanding the Patterns of Global Political History Through an Anthropology of Knowledge – The Case of Agriculture in Four Global Systems from the Neolithic to the Present
- Religious Diversity and the Secular University

== Research Networks ==
The CRASSH Research Networks Programme supports groups of Cambridge graduate students and faculty members working together with a common interdisciplinary research interest, bringing together early-career researchers, established academics and guest speakers on particular research topics for a year of collaborative work.

== Events and Initiatives ==
The CRASSH events and initiatives programme showcases arts, social sciences and humanities research.

== Fellowships ==
CRASSH offers a number of Fellowship programmes. These schemes allow a community of scholars to interact in an interdisciplinary research environment.

== Alison Richard Building ==
At the beginning of 2012, CRASSH moved into the new Alison Richard Building at the West Road gateway to the University’s Sidgwick Site, the main base for humanities and social science teaching and research at Cambridge. The building was designed by Nicholas Hare Architects and received a commendation at the 2013 Civic Trust Awards. The Centre’s relocation put CRASSH alongside the major regional studies centres as well as the Department of Politics and International Studies. The building is also home to Edmund de Waal's first piece of public sculpture, A Local History, a commission of three vitrines filled with porcelain and sunk into the pavement outside the building.
