= Faculty of Education, University of Cambridge =

Faculty of University of Cambridge, England

- Type: Public
- Established: 2001
- Academic staff: 80
- Students: ~1000
- Location: Donald McIntyre Building, Hills Road, Cambridge, England; 52°11′12.19″N 0°8′12.51″E
- Campus: Urban
- Website: www.educ.cam.ac.uk

Faculty of Education, University of Cambridge is the School of Education at the University of Cambridge in Cambridge, England. It was established in 2001. It is part of the school of humanities and social sciences at the University of Cambridge.

Courses at the school include undergraduate, masters and doctoral programmes, initial teacher education and training, and professional development studies:

- MPhil (full-time)
- Master of Education (part-time)
- PhD (full and part-time)
- EdD (part-time)
- Undergraduate Education BA
- Postgraduate Professional Development, including an accredited Counselling Programme
- Postgraduate Certificate in Education (PGCE)

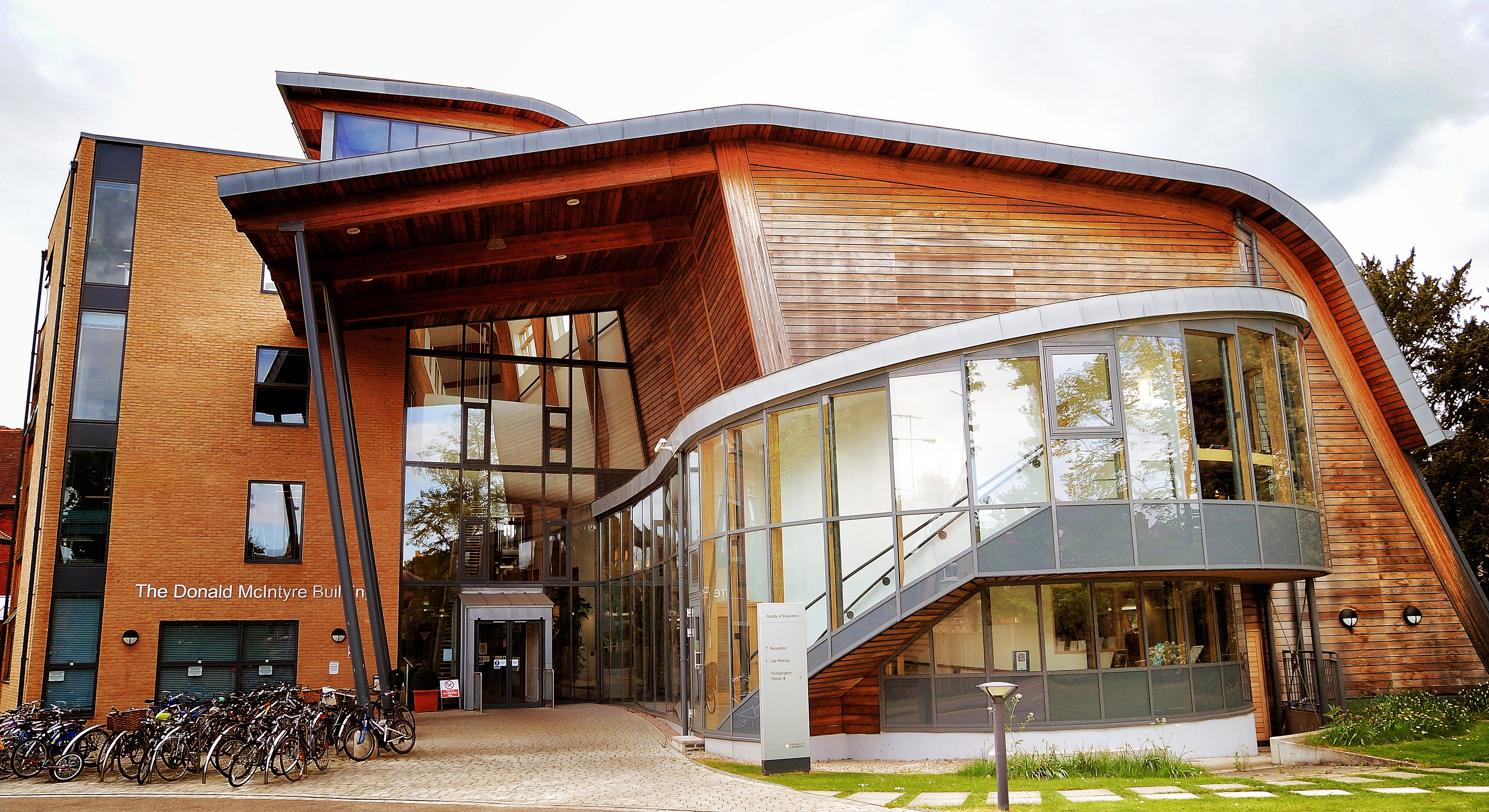
Donald Mcintyre Building, Faculty of Education, University of Cambridge

Students at the Faculty of Education, University of Cambridge also join one of the Cambridge Colleges.

The faculty is situated on Hills road, near Homerton College.

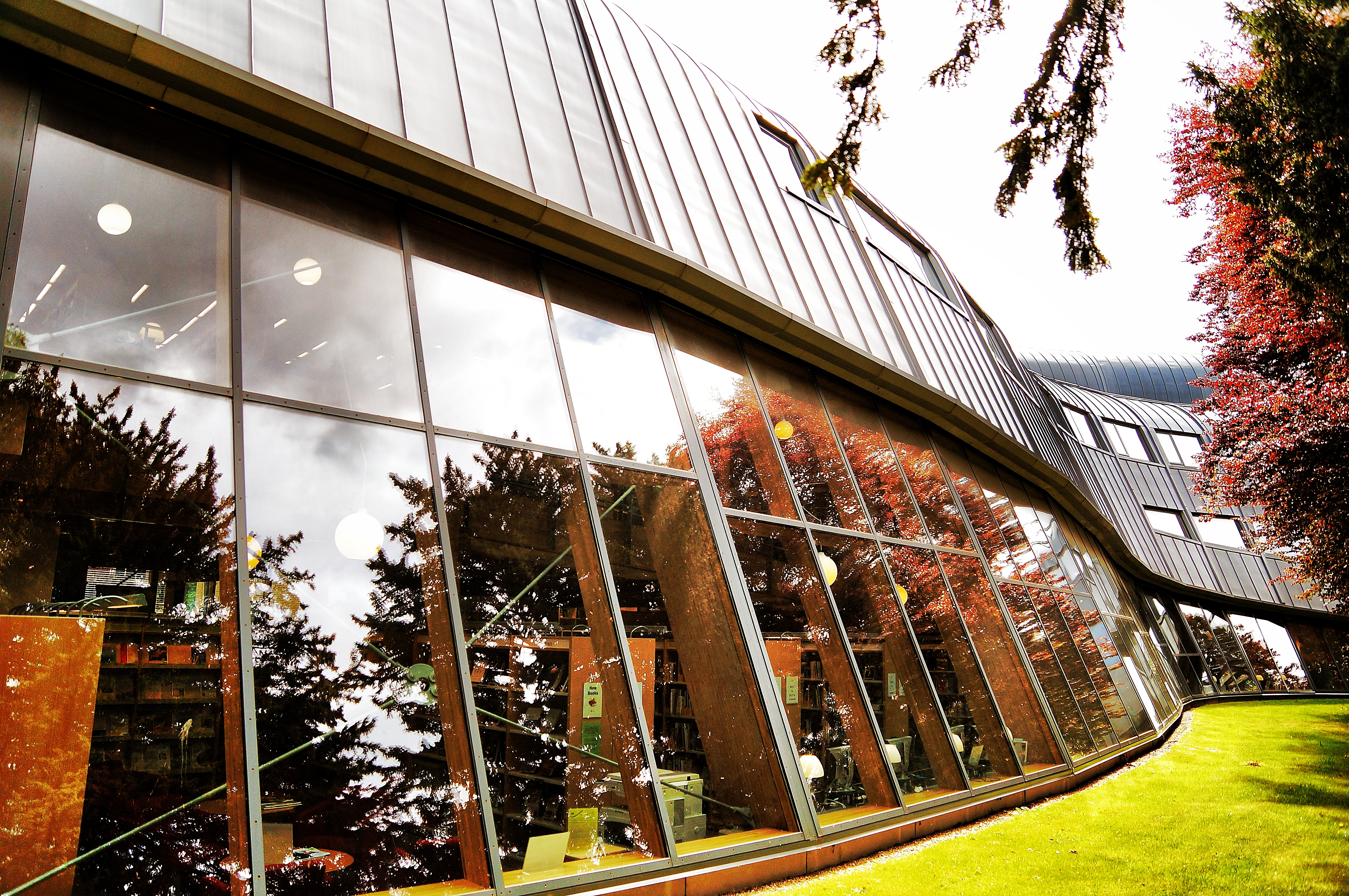
Library in spring, Faculty of Education, University of Cambridge

== History ==
Faculty of Education, University of Cambridge was formed by the merger of three prior departments: the Institute of Education, the Department of Education (initially on Trumpington street) and the teaching interests of Homerton College. The new faculty building was designed by Building Design Partnership, and was opened in 2005 by Prince Philip. It was named the Donald McIntyre Building in 2009.

== World university education subject rankings ==
Faculty of Education, University of Cambridge was ranked 4th in the world according to the QS World University Rankings in Education 2017. However, in the 2014 UK Research Excellence Framework for Education, the faculty ranked 5th. The next REF report will be in 2021.

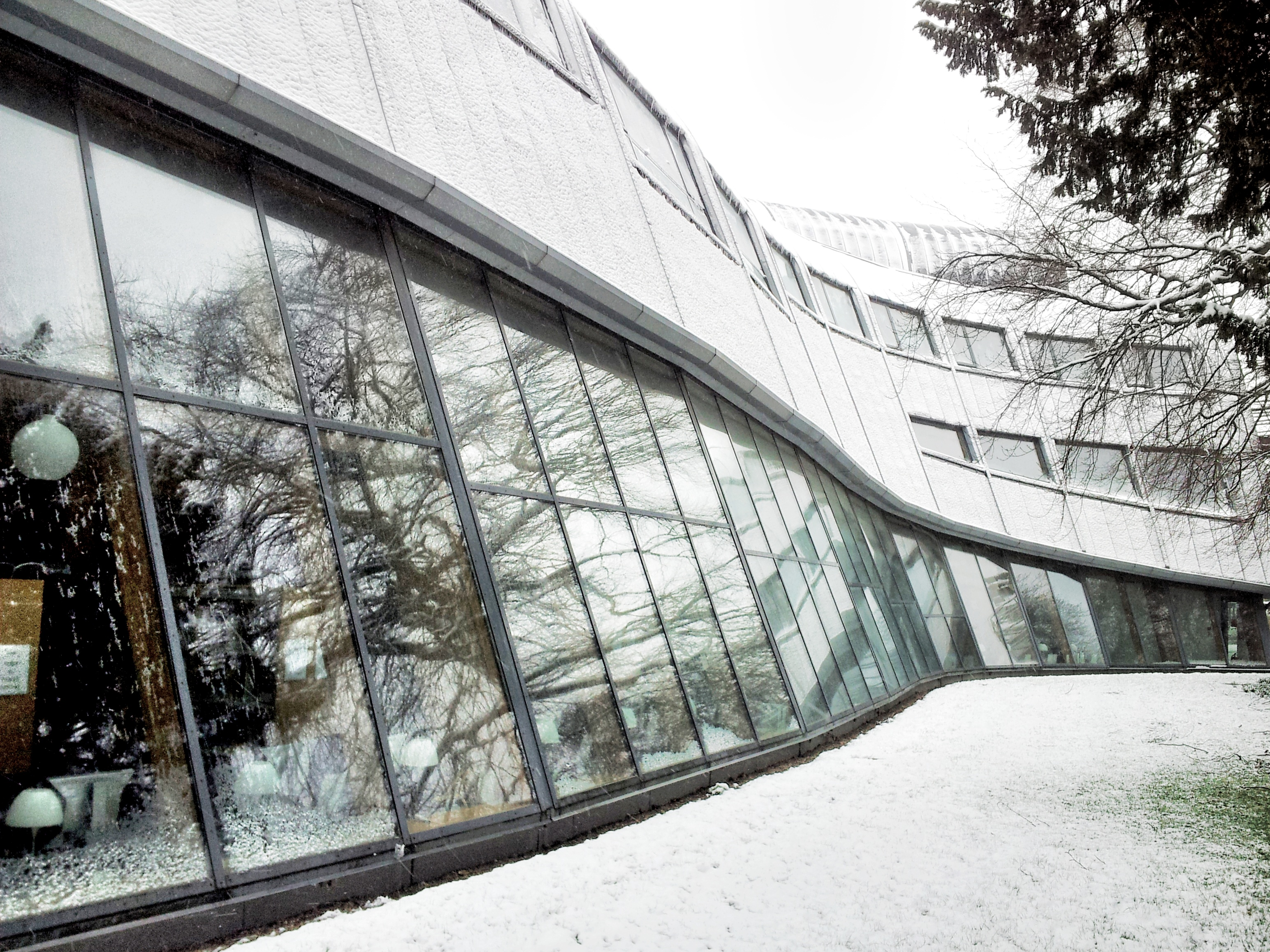
Library in winter, Faculty of Education, University of Cambridge

== Research groups, interests and centres ==
Faculty of Education has a number of research groups, research interests and research teaching centres which bring together academics in a variety of fields. Some faculty researchers and initial teacher educators are partnered with the University of Cambridge Primary School, opened in 2015, which is the first of its kind.

The academic groups are:

- Education, Equality & Development
- Educational Leadership, Policy, Evaluation and Change
- Pedagogy, Language and Culture in Education
- Psychology & Education
- Science, Technology & Mathematics Education

The research interest groups include:

- Creativities and Arts
- Education and International Development
- Education Policy and Evaluation
- History, Philosophy and Sociology of Education
- Psychology and Education
- Teacher and Professional Education
- Teaching and Pedagogy

The research and teaching centres are:

- Education Reform and Innovation
- Centre for Children's Literature
- Leadership for Learning: the Cambridge Network
- PEDAL: Centre for Research on Play in Education, Development and Learning
- REAL: Research for Equitable Access and Learning

Previous research centres:

- Cambridge Primary Review Trust
- Centre for Commonwealth Education (see also OER4Schools programme)

== Notable academics ==
- Maria Nikolajeva, director, centre for children's literature
- Jason Arday
- Diane Reay
- Rex Walford, head of the then department of education in the 1990s
