= Laurel Powers-Freeling =

British businesswoman

Laurel Claire Powers-Freeling (née Powers; born May 16, 1957, in Michigan, United States) is a British businesswoman also involved in music charities, education-related activities and public service.

== Early life ==
Powers-Freeling grew up in Bloomfield Hills, Michigan. She graduated with an AB first from the Barnard College of Columbia University in New York City and then pursued an MSc from the MIT Sloan School of Management.

== Business career ==
Powers-Freeling started her professional career at Price Waterhouse New York and Boston as a part-time management consultant while studying at the MIT Sloan School of Management, having worked for Clinique Laboratories Ltd (a division of Estee Lauder) and in administrative roles at Price Waterhouse before and during her undergraduate study. Upon leaving MIT, she joined McKinsey & Co in Atlanta and London (1985–1989), working in some eleven countries during her tenure supporting financial services companies. . She then moved to Morgan Stanley in corporate finance (1989–1991) International in London, where she focused on corporate finance for European insurers (1989–1991), leaving to become director of corporate strategy at one of her clients, Prudential plc (1991–1994). Having helped shape the strategy that set the Pru on a course of Asian expansion, Powers-Freeling was recruited to be the group finance director of Lloyds Abbey Life (1994–1997) and joined Lloyds Bank (later Lloyds TSB) when it fully acquired Lloyds Abbey Life (1997–2001), becoming finance director of Lloyds TSB Retail Bank, and later the managing director of the Wealth Management Division. In 2001 she joined Marks & Spencer Plc as the chief executive of its financial services business, also serving as a group executive director on the main board of M&S and overseeing the early development of M&S’s on-line retail offering (www.marksandspencer.com). She launched the M&S Money brand and other products, leaving M&S in 2004 when the financial services business was sold to HSBC as part of a successful defence strategy to fend-off a hostile takeover bid launched by Sir Phillip Green. She then became an executive director of American Express Europe Ltd., where she was UK Country Manager, launching the American Express RED credit card in conjunction with the Global Fund to fight Aids in Africa. From 2007-2009 she was Group CEO of Dubai First International.

Having retired from full-time executive roles, Powers-Freeling pursued a range of senior advisory positions, including a fourteen-month stint with the Bank of England’s Special Resolution Unit developing the pilot approach to the Recovery and Resolution Plan regime. She has developed a portfolio career, serving as Chairman of Uber UK, and is also Chairman of Sumitomo Mitsui Banking Corporation Europe, a major provider of European project and corporate finance and a part of one of the ‘top 20’ banks in the world by assets. She is also Senior Independent Director of Atom Bank. Her previous non-executive directorships include:

- The Bank of England (2002–2005)
- Environmental Resource Management (2005–2007)
- Findel plc (2010-2014)
- Bank of Ireland, UK plc (2010-2015)
- ACE European Group (2012-2015)
- Premium Credit Ltd. (2012-2015)
- C. Hoare & Co (2010-2017)
- Callcredit Information Group (2014-2017)

== Charity, education and public service ==
Powers-Freeling has served as a Governor of the Royal Academy of Music since 2007. She was Chairman of Piccola Accademia di Montisi, an Italian charity she co-founded to provide a global centre for students and emerging professional early keyboard musicians to study with top harpsichordists, providing access to exceptional instruments in the inspirational setting of the Tuscan countryside.

Having had a hip-replacement operation in 2009, Powers-Freeling volunteered to take the Chair of the NHS National Joint Registry, the UK's Joint replacement registry.

Powers-Freeling was appointed Chairman of Cambridge University Health Partners, the Academic Health Science Centre for Cambridge, in early 2018, with a mission to improve local and global health by effective alignment of the world class assets accessible in the Cambridge environment.

== Personal life ==
Powers-Freeling married Dr Anthony Freeling whom she met at McKinsey, where he was a senior partner. They live in Cambridge, where Anthony is the University of Cambridge Acting Vice-Chancellor (from October 2022 to June 2023), and was the president of Hughes Hall, Cambridge (2014 to 2022). She took British citizenship in 2002. They have two daughters (born December 1991 and March 1994), and live in Cambridge.

She holds the Diplôme Universitaire du Goût, de la Gastronomie et des Arts de la Table with distinction from the Université de Reims Champagne-Ardenne. She also holds the WSET Level 3 Award in Wines and Spirits with distinction and continues her pursuit of wine education. Her other interests include music, interior design, sewing and restoring ancient buildings.
