= Liam Mooney =

Ireland international rugby union player (born 1972)

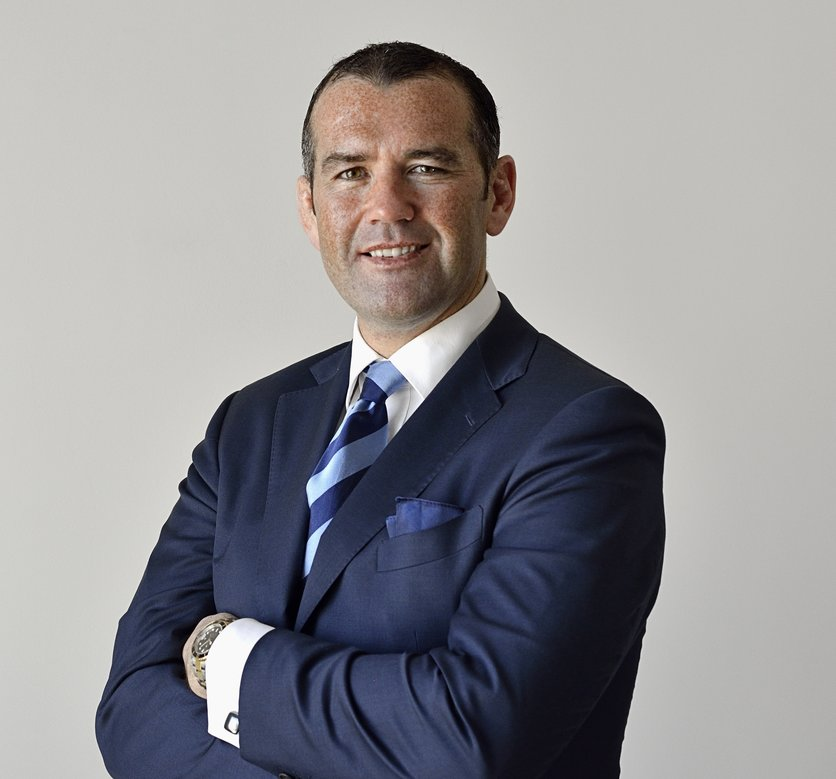
- Born: Liam Thomas Mooney; 18 May 1972 (age 54) Gosport, Hampshire, England
- Notable relative: Fred Tiedt
- Occupation: Entrepreneur

Rugby union career
- Position: Prop
Amateur team(s)
Years	Team	Apps	(Points)
1992–1996	London Irish		
1994–1995	Cambridge University		
Senior career
Years	Team	Apps	(Points)
1996–1998	London Irish	39	(0)
1998–1999	Blackheath	20	(0)
1999–2001	Exeter Chiefs	55	(70)
International career
Years	Team	Apps	(Points)
199x–199x	Ireland Students		
1996–2000	Ireland XV		
–	Barbarians		
–	England Counties XV		

Liam Thomas Mooney (born 18 May 1972) is a former professional rugby union footballer who played at prop. He is now an entrepreneur living in Monaco with his wife and son.

== Education ==
Mooney was educated at St Boniface's Catholic College, Plymouth and graduated from the University of Cambridge (Hughes Hall) in 1996.

== Rugby career ==
Mooney began his rugby career with London Irish in 1992, making his debut as a prop against Bath aged 20 years old. He represented London Irish in both premiership and European competitions. Mooney played in the club's biggest premiership win, beating Harlequin F.C. 62–14 in April 1998. He was a member of the promotion winning team that took London Irish to the English Premiership in 1996, as well as the semi-final of the Pilkington Cup, under the leadership of Sir Clive Woodward. He moved on to play for Blackheath (1998–1999) and Exeter Chiefs (1999–2001). From 1996 in the professional era, Mooney scored 14 tries and made over 100 appearances for his clubs. While at Exeter, he played for the English National Divisions and scored the winning try against the Springboks on their 2000 tour of the UK. During his career, Mooney represented Ireland XV (vs Leinster 1996), Ireland A, Ireland U21, Ireland Students, the Barbarians and won two Cambridge Blues representing Cambridge University in the winning 1994 and 1995 Varsity matches. He finished his rugby career at Bristol and Caerphilly where he retired with a chronic knee injury.

== Business career ==
Mooney qualified as a solicitor of England & Wales in November 2000, having trained and worked at international law firm Kennedys and regional legal 500 law firm, Michelmores. In 2002, Mooney founded Blue Pencil, an international legal executive search and recruitment company, where he is currently the managing director. Blue Pencil is mentioned in Sidney Korshak's book "How to Land a Legal Job Overseas".

In November 2014, he was named by Arabian Business as 'Business Mentor of the Year' and was a finalist at the SME Stars of Business Awards in December 2014.

In August 2015, Mooney was named as a finalist in the Gulf Capital SME Awards, as the “Business Leader of the Year”.

== The Business End ==
Mooney is the co-founder and host of The Business End, a sports-business leadership network and podcast launched with former Ireland international Justin Fitzpatrick. The platform explores how lessons from elite sport apply to business and leadership, featuring international sports people and business leaders.

Through live events — including The Business End Live Lunch series held in London and internationally — the initiative connects senior business leaders, investors, and athletes whilst promoting the message of sport to business.
