= Kirkus (surname) =

English surname

Kirkus is an English surname originating from a family living near the kirkus, which referred to a 'kirk (church) house' or the 'parsonage'. The surname first was first found in Yorkshire, but is today most prevalent in the United States. Notable people with this surname include:

- Virginia Kirkus (1893–1980), founder of American book review magazine Kirkus Reviews
- Colin Kirkus (1910–1942), British mountain climber and author
- Sister Gregory Kirkus (1910–2007), English Roman Catholic nun, educator, historian and archivist.
