= Nevin Hughes-Jones =

British haematologist (1923–2022)

Nevin Hughes-Jones FRCP, FRS
- Born: Nevin Campbell Hughes-Jones; 10 February 1923
- Died: 22 June 2022 (aged 99)
- Occupation: Haematologist

Nevin Campbell Hughes-Jones FRCP, FRS (10 February 1923 – 22 June 2022) was a British haematologist, and a Life Fellow of Hughes Hall, Cambridge.

Between 1952 and 1988 Hughes-Jones worked for the Medical Research Council's Experimental Haematology unit at St Mary's Hospital Medical School and for the Molecular Immunopathology Unit at Cambridge.

Following formal retirement, he continued to research on Rhesus antigens and their antibodies, at Cambridge.

Hughes-Jones also wrote on matters related to international relations and peace. He died on 22 June 2022, at the age of 99.

== Works ==
- Lecture notes on haematology. Wiley-Blackwell. 2004. ISBN 978-1-4051-0229-2.
