= Helena L. Powell =

English headmistress (1862–1942)

Principal of Hughes Hall, Cambridge
- In office 1902–1908
- Preceded by: Margaret Punnett
- Succeeded by: Mary Hay Wood

Personal details
- Born: 1862
- Died: 1942 (aged 79–80)
- Education: Newnham College, Cambridge
- Occupation: Headmistress of Leeds Girls' High School, 1892-1902; Principal of St Mary's Training College, Lancaster Gate, 1908-1933

Helena Langhorne Powell FRHistS (1862–1942) was an English religious studies teacher and teacher trainer. She served as the second headmistress of Leeds Girls’ High School, the third Principal of Hughes Hall, Cambridge, and the Principal of St Mary’s Training College, Lancaster Gate.

== Life ==
Powell was born in September 1862 and educated at a Girls' Public Day School Company school in Clapham. She received a first-class pass in History from Newnham College, Cambridge in 1884 (the University of Cambridge did not award degrees to women at the time).

From 1885–1892, she taught at Oxford High School, and then she succeeded Catherine Lucy Kennedy as headmistress of Leeds Girls’ High School from 1892–1902. She became principal of the Cambridge Training College for Women Teachers (later Hughes Hall) in 1902, taking over from Margaret Young, who had served as interim principal after the departure of Margaret Punnett. While there, she established the Powell Prize in Religious Studies. She then became principal of St Mary’s Training College, Lancaster Gate, in 1908, where she remained until her retirement in 1933.

Powell wrote papers on religious and sex education.

She died in 1942.
