= Anthony Freeling =

British management consultant, marketing expert, university administrator and academic

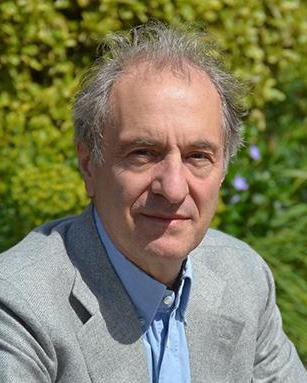

Vice-Chancellor of the University of Cambridge
- Acting
- In office 1 October 2022 – 30 June 2023
- Preceded by: Stephen Toope
- Succeeded by: Deborah Prentice

President of Hughes Hall, Cambridge
- In office 1 October 2014 – July 2022
- Preceded by: Sarah Squire
- Succeeded by: Sir Laurie Bristow

Personal details
- Born: Anthony Nigel Stanley Freeling; 6 August 1956 (age 69)
- Spouse: Laurel Powers-Freeling (m. 1989)
- Children: Two
- Education: St John's College, Cambridge (BA, MPhil, PhD)

Anthony Nigel Stanley Freeling (born 6 August 1956) is a British management consultant, marketing expert, university administrator, and academic. He served as Acting Vice-Chancellor of the University of Cambridge from October 2022 to June 2023, and was President of Hughes Hall, Cambridge from 2014 to 2022.

== Early life and education ==
Freeling was born in London in 1956, the son of Dr Paul and Shirley Freeling. He was educated at Haberdashers' Aske's School, Elstree, and St John's College, Cambridge, where he graduated with a first-class B.A. degree in maths in 1978, an M.Phil. in control engineering and operational research in 1980 and a Ph.D. in management studies in 1985. In 2022 he was made an Honorary Fellow of St John's College.

== Career ==
Before moving to academia, Freeling worked as a Director (senior partner) of McKinsey & Company and was a member of the Governing Body of the Open University.

=== University of Cambridge ===
From 2008 to 2014, Freeling was a City Fellow of Hughes Hall, Cambridge; this is a type of fellowship held by those active in the City of London or other areas of business rather than full-time academics. In December 2013, he was elected President of Hughes Hall, and he took up the appointment on 1 October 2014, for a period of eight years. His term as president ended in July 2022.

In May 2022, it was announced that Freeling was to become Acting Vice-Chancellor of the University of Cambridge, following the announcement of the early departure of then Vice-Chancellor Stephen Toope. He took up the post on 1 October 2022 and held the appointment for nine months, until the appointment of Deborah Prentice: he was the first acting vice-chancellor in the history of the university.

== Personal life ==
In 1989, Freeling married the then Laurel Claire Powers. Together they have two daughters.

== Works ==
- Agile Marketing (2011)

Academic offices
Preceded by Sarah Squire	President of Hughes Hall, Cambridge; 2014–2022	Succeeded by Sir Laurie Bristow
Preceded by Stephen Toope	Acting Vice-Chancellor of the University of Cambridge; 2022–2023	Succeeded by Deborah Prentice
