= Eleanor Marguerite Verini =

English college head (1894 – 1987)

Principal of Hughes Hall, Cambridge
- In office 1949–1953
- Preceded by: Henriette Dent
- Succeeded by: Margaret Wileman

Personal details
- Born: 19 May 1894 Exton, Hampshire
- Died: 7 July 1987 (aged 93) Haslemere
- Education: St Hilda's, Oxford
- Occupation: Headmistress of Ely High School and Loughton High School; Lecturer in English; Lecturer in Education

Eleanor Marguerite Verini (1894 – 1987) was an English teacher trainer and headmistress. She was headmistress of Ely and Loughton High Schools and Principal of Hughes Hall, Cambridge at the time of its incorporation into the University of Cambridge.

== Early life and education ==
Verini was born on 19 May 1894 in Exton, Hampshire, one of three daughters of rector Raphael Verini and his wife Bertha. She was educated at Queen Margaret’s School, Scarborough and Cheltenham Ladies’ College.

She studied English at St Hilda’s College, Oxford during World War I, and joined the other undergraduates in making bandages and growing vegetables on the allotment. She played hymns in the church services provided for the wounded in the Examination School.

She then trained as a teacher at Clapham. She received her MA from both Oxford and Cambridge when those universities began awarding degrees to women, having become a member of Girton College, Cambridge.

== Career ==
Verini taught English at Edgbaston High School and at the Cambridge Training College for Women from 1925–9.

From 1929 to 1936, she was headmistress of Ely High School. She was then headmistress of Loughton High School, Epping Forest. She also taught teachers of scriptural studies on the Board of Education’s holiday courses.

She was Principal of Cambridge Teacher Training College from 1949–1953. The College was facing difficulties in the aftermath of World War II, including the limited accommodation, which could not house enough students to support the College financially. One of Verini’s first projects was to acquire a new annexe for residents. Applications rose to about 300 per year from the late 1940s.

In 1949, the College became a Recognised Institution of the University of Cambridge so that women there could become members. Verini therefore received the status of Lecturer in Education and Director of Women Students. In 1950, the college’s name changed to Hughes Hall, Cambridge.

Verini specialised in religious education, providing lectures to students of Hughes Hall and the Department of Education, and conducting discussions with students at Westcott House, who were not eligible to attend the lectures. She was also involved with negotiating with the Ministry of Education about salaries, fees and pensions.

On her retirement in 1953, she moved to Haslemere, Surrey and died on 7 July 1987.
