= Mary Hay Wood =

English college head (1868–1933)

Principal of Hughes Hall, Cambridge
- In office 1908–1933
- Preceded by: Helena Powell
- Succeeded by: Henriette Dent

Personal details
- Born: 1868 Holloway
- Died: 1933 (aged 64–65) Regent's Park
- Education: Girton College, Cambridge

Mary Hay Wood (1868–1933) was an English educator and teacher trainer who was post-war head of Hughes Hall, Cambridge.

== Early life and education ==
Wood was born 17 April 1868 in Holloway, London, the fifth daughter of barrister Arthur Wood and his wife Elizabeth, née Nicolson.

Educated at North London Collegiate School, she won a scholarship to Girton College, Cambridge in 1886, where she studied classics.

She was one of the ‘steamboat ladies’ who travelled to Ireland by steamboat to receive her DLitt in 1907 while Cambridge did not award degrees to women. Her MA thesis, published in The Journal of Philosophy, Psychology and Scientific Methods that year, was 'Plato’s Psychology and its Bearing on the Development of the Will'.

== Career ==
Between 1890 and 1908 she taught classics at Blair Lodge School for Boys, North London Collegiate School and the Clergy Orphans’ School in St John’s Wood. In 1904, she became lecturer in pedagogy at St Mary’s College, Paddington, where she became head of the training department and vice-principal.

In 1908 she was appointed principal of the Cambridge Training College for Women, later Hughes Hall. She saw the college through WWI and the flu epidemic, noting afterwards that demand for education was only continuing to grow as people did not want to feel disadvantaged compared to their better-educated peers.

She retired in June 1933, donating her retirement gift back into the college loan fund, and died on 1 June 1934 at her home in Regent’s Park, London.
