= Mary Brebner =

British teacher (1858–1933)

- Born: 31 December 1858; Aberdeen, Scotland
- Died: 6 May 1933 (aged 74); Aberystwyth, Wales

Academic background
- Education: University College Wales (BA); University of London

Academic work
- Discipline: Modern languages, classics
- Sub-discipline: German language, Latin
- Institutions: University College Wales

Mary Brebner (31 December 1858 – 6 May 1933) was a British teacher. She was one of the first women teaching German in Britain, and one of the first women lecturers at Aberystwyth University, where she taught modern and ancient languages, and ran the languages department during the First World War. She has been described as one of the "most influential women in the teaching of modern foreign languages in Britain."

== Life and career ==
Mary Brebner was born in Aberdeen in December 1858 to William Brebner and Jane Brebner (née Rodger McSwein). She read for her undergraduate degree at University College Wales, matriculating in 1881 at the Ladies College and passing her first set of exams with a first-class mark in 1883. She received her BA in 1885, and read for two master's degrees at University College London in 1893 and 1895 in Classics and French and German. She trained at the Cambridge Teachers Training College under Elizabeth Phillips Hughes and gained the Gilchrist Travelling Scholarship. Her report from the scholarship was published as a multi-edition volume on the teaching of modern language in Germany, which has been described as "very influential," and which has been reprinted multiple times. Brebner was a "reformer" in language teaching, arguing for teaching through use of the language rather than teaching about the language. She taught in high schools and lectured on modern languages to pupil teachers under the London School Board.

In 1897 Brebner was awarded funds by the Soames Trust to encourage the use of phonetics in language teaching in English and Welsh schools. In 1898 she was appointed assistant lecturer at Aberystwyth University, where she taught Modern Languages (primarily French and German) and was to assist in teaching Latin and English language. In 1914 when the First World War broke out she was promoted to Lecturer in the absence of the previous professor of German at Aberystwyth, and she ran the department successfully during the course of the war. She retired in 1919, and died in 1933.

== Publications ==
- Brebner, M. (1899) The method of teaching modern languages in Germany: being the report presented to the trustees of the Gilchrist Educational Trust on a visit to Germany in 1897, as Gilchrist Travelling Scholar (London)
