= Henriette Dent =

Principal of Hughes Hall, Cambridge
- In office 1933–1945
- Preceded by: Mary Hay Wood
- Succeeded by: Eleanor Marguerite Verini

Personal details
- Born: 1883
- Died: 1966 (aged 82–83)
- Education: Girton College, Cambridge
- Occupation: Head of Postgraduate Department of Clapham High School, 1915-33

Henriette Dent (1883–1966) was an English teacher trainer who served as Principal of Hughes Hall, Cambridge.

== Life ==
Educated at Sydenham High School, she received an MA in History from Girton College, Cambridge and a London University Diploma in Education.

From 1907–1913 she held a lectureship in History at St Mary's College, Paddington. She was then Head of the Postgraduate Department for teacher training of Clapham High School, 1915–33.

Dent served as Principal of the Cambridge Training College for Women (later Hughes Hall) from 1933–45. Her headship included the purchase of the freehold of the College's Wollaston Road site from Gonville and Caius College in 1935 and the building of a new wing there. Dent was appointed Woman Examiner for the Practical Examination of the Teachers' Certificate of Education offered by the University of Cambridge's newly formed Department of Education. She retired in 1943.

Afterwards, she served as Acting Principal of King’s College of Household & Social Science, and she was involved in the college's change of name to Queen Elizabeth College, which was ratified in 1953. She served on the Council of the Girls' Public Day School Trust for nearly twenty years.
