= John Thorn (headmaster) =

English writer and educational consultant (1925–2023)

John Leonard Thorn

John Leonard Thorn (28 April 1925 – 20 October 2023) was an English schoolmaster, writer and educational consultant. He was headmaster of Repton School from 1961 to 1968 and then of Winchester College until 1985. He was chairman of the Headmasters' Conference for 1981.

== Early life ==
John Leonard Thorn was born in Chiswick on 28 April 1925. The son of Stanley Thorn, a bookmaker, and his wife Winifred, a librarian, he went to school at Colet Court, where he won a scholarship to St Paul's School, London. He left school during the Second World War to join the Royal Naval Volunteer Reserve in 1943. He served as gunnery officer with the rank of Sub-Lieutenant on the destroyer HMS Eskimo in the Indian Ocean. On returning to civilian life in 1946, he took up his deferred scholarship to Corpus Christi College, Cambridge, where he obtained a double first in history in 1949, mentored by Desmond Lee. He began teaching at Clifton in 1949, where Lee had become headmaster. Thorn became head of the history department there, and then a housemaster.

== Repton School ==
Thorn was appointed headmaster of Repton School in 1961. He expanded the teaching of drama and art, praising these as cultivating creativity and sensitivity. For Thorn, the most valuable aspects of school drama, art or music was pupils' participation and experience of the creative process, such as writing and producing plays, even if the product had rough edges.

He hoped to make the boys more "industrious, creative and happy" in a school where, he felt, sport overshadowed everything else, and which he saw as "a rather brutal place" for boys not suited to the school's culture, which he found "disconcertingly hearty". He reduced corporal punishment and abolished fagging, where the youngest pupils were assigned for two years as servants for the most senior boys, who could beat them for mistakes. He opposed the traditional dominance of school sport, writing that "The arts must no longer be Cinderellas", and "must no longer take second place to cricket nets and the rest of it". These challenges to Repton's traditions created such strong hostility from "a cohesive faction" of conservative, sport-focused teachers, that he decided to leave the school; some of them celebrated when he left.

The school's examination performance improved during his tenure, and at least some pupils such as the poet James Fenton and the professor of classical lieder Richard Stokes benefited from its creative arts.

== Winchester College ==
=== Modernisation ===
In 1968 he took over as headmaster of Winchester College, when Lee, who had moved from Clifton to Winchester before him, retired. Thorn encouraged the school's "Div system", where boys spent 1/5 of their class time on non-examined subjects such as history and literature for scientists and science for non-scientists, aimed purely to expand pupils' perspective on the world. Inspired by Repton's drama and art, he creating a theatre workshop (from a former gymnasium) and an art school (from the old sanatorium) at Winchester to encourage the participatory arts. He encouraged music with additional money for scholarships, and saw the school's staging of operas as a crowning accomplishment.

He found that Winchester, inspired by late 1960s counterculture, was already rejecting traditional austere public school customs such as he had encountered at Repton, as senior boys were refusing to continue them. He reduced compulsory attendance at Chapel, and tried to increase the teachers' pastoral care of their pupils in the face of the period's countercultural drugtaking, while allowing the boys to wear their hair rather longer than had been customary. He wanted the school to be open to a wider range of pupils—not only those with wealthy parents, and to widen its approach from emphasising the classics to cover the humanities including English literature, and the sciences.

The Daily Telegraph called Thorn a visionary head, with ample "charm and panache", making him an extremely effective leader. In their view, he became "one of the most influential – and unconventional – schoolmasters of his time." He retired from the school in 1985.

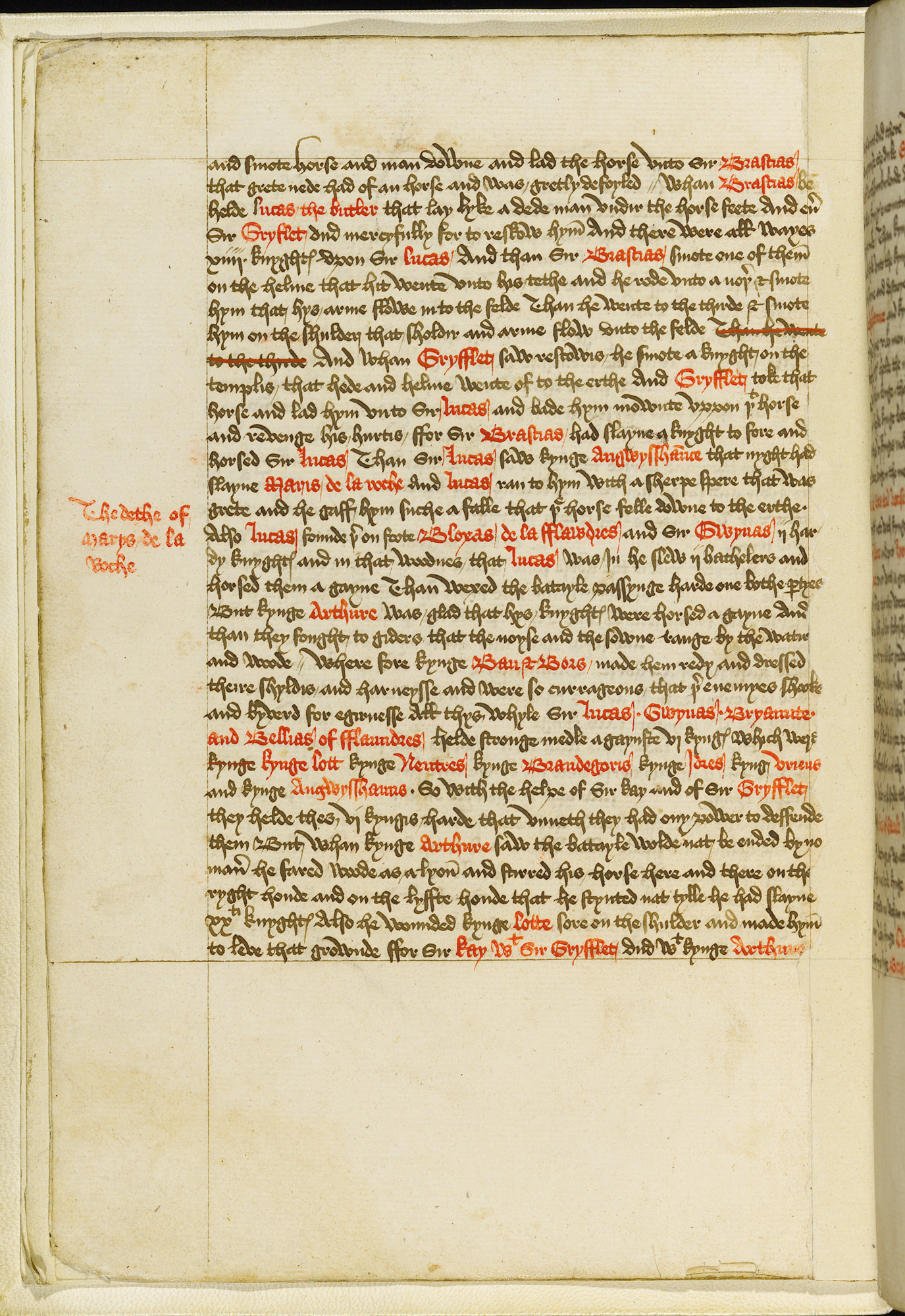
A page from the c. 1471–1483 Winchester manuscript of Le Morte d'Arthur, which Thorn sold to fund bursaries.

=== Sale of Morte d'Arthur manuscript ===
Thorn sold Winchester College's 15th century manuscript of Thomas Malory's Le Morte d'Arthur to the British Library to fund bursaries for poorer pupils; the sale, completed in 1976, sharply divided opinion at the school.

=== John Smyth affair ===
While Thorn was at Winchester, John Smyth, a barrister who lived nearby, became dominant in the School's Christian forum. Smyth persuaded some 16 Winchester boys to undergo severe beatings as a kind of penance. When in 1982 Thorn discovered what was happening, he asked Smyth to sign an agreement not to contact young people at the college or elsewhere; this did not prevent Smyth from abusing other boys in the UK and in Africa. Thorn later said he regretted not reporting Smyth to the police, and felt to blame for acting too slowly.

== Public service and retirement ==
Thorn used his year as chairman of the Headmasters' Conference in 1981 to oppose what he saw as excessive emphasis on A-level results for university admissions, and to champion public schools, since he believed that "education is far too important to be left to governments." He was a director of the Royal Opera House from 1971 to 1976; a Trustee of the British Museum from 1980 to 1985, and of the Winchester Cathedral Trust, from 1986 to 1989; and vice-chairman of the Hampshire Buildings Preservation Trust from 1989 to 1992, then its chairman until 1996. For some years he served on the executive committee of the Cancer Research Campaign. He was chairman of governors of Abingdon School from 1991 to 1994 and a governor of Oakham School and of Stowe School during the 1980s. After retiring from Winchester, Thorn taught at King Edward VI School, Southampton and then The Portsmouth Grammar School.

== Personal life ==
In 1955, Thorn married Veronica Laura, daughter of the barrister Sir Robert Maconochie; they had one son and one daughter. His wife died in 1999. Behind his "brilliant and stylish" public persona, The Daily Telegraph describes Thorn as a private man who liked quiet activities such as cooking, gardening, reading, and writing. In 1989 he published his autobiography, Road to Winchester. He died on 20 October 2023, at the age of 98.

== Publications ==
- A History of England (1961, contributor)
- Thorn, John (1989). Road to Winchester. London: Weidenfeld and Nicolson. ISBN 978-0-297-79201-7.

Academic offices
Preceded by Theodore Lynam Thomas	Headmaster of Repton School; 1961–1968	Succeeded by John Gammell
Preceded by Sir Desmond Lee	Headmaster of Winchester College; 1968–1985	Succeeded by James Paley Sabben-Clare
