= Gilberto Arias =

Panamanian lawyer

His Excellency Gilberto Arias

Panamanian Ambassador to the United Kingdom
- In office July 2009 – November 2011
- President: Ricardo Martinelli
- Succeeded by: Ana Irene Delgado

Personal details
- Born: 1960 (age 65–66)
- Education: University of Virginia; Hughes Hall, Cambridge
- Occupation: Lawyer, Consultant, Diplomat

Gilberto Arias (born 1964) was the Panamanian Ambassador to the United Kingdom from July 2009 to November 2011.

== Education ==
Arias attended the University of Virginia from 1982 to 1986, graduating with a Bachelor of Arts degree in philosophy and economics. In 1986, following his graduation, he attended the University of Cambridge, graduating with a degree in law in 1988 and an LLM in 1989.

== Career ==
Arias became an associate lawyer at his father's firm of Arias Fabrega & Fabrega in 1990 and worked in the firm for ten years until 2000. He subsequently was an executive at the newspaper publishing group Editora Panamá America S.A., Panama, until 2009. In 2008 he became Director of Capital Bank, Panama. In 2009 he was appointed as Panama's ambassador to The United Kingdom of Great Britain and Northern Ireland where he would serve until November 2011. He currently works as a consultant on climate change and sustainable development between Panama, Latin America, and the United Kingdom.
