= Sarah Squire =

British diplomat (born 1949)

President of Hughes Hall, Cambridge
- In office 2006–2014
- Preceded by: Peter Richards
- Succeeded by: Anthony Freeling

Personal details
- Born: Sarah Hutchison; 18 July 1949 (age 76)
- Spouse: William Squire
- Children: Five
- Occupation: Deputy High Steward, Cambridge University

Sarah Squire (née Hutchison; born 18 July 1949), is a British former diplomat. She was President of Hughes Hall, a college of the University of Cambridge, from 2006 to 2014.

== Early life ==
Born in London, Sara Hutchison (as she then was) was educated at St Paul's Girls' School, London, before winning an exhibition to read History at Newnham College, Cambridge. From Cambridge she entered HM Diplomatic Service.

== Career ==
Her work as a diplomat took her to Israel, Washington DC, Senegal, Macedonia and Croatia. From 1995 she developed a major interest in the transition process in the countries of central and eastern Europe, working for the Know How Fund and as deputy head of the FCO Central European department. From 2000 to 2003 she was HM Ambassador in Estonia.

In 2006 Sarah Squire was elected as the 14th President of Hughes Hall, Cambridge, a position she held until 2014. In this period she also served as a Deputy Vice Chancellor, Deputy Chairman of the Cambridge Alumni Advisory Board, Syndic of the Fitzwilliam Museum and Chair of Fitzwilliam Enterprises and Chair of the Centre for Family Research. In 2010, she chaired the University's Trademark and Licensing working group. She was also Deputy Chairman of the Cambridge Commonwealth, European and International Trust.

Outside the University she was connected with University College London as a member of the Advisory Board of the School of Slavonic and East European Studies, and from 2004-6 was an international trustee of the New Eurasia Foundation. She has been Chairman of the Kurt Hahn Trust, Chair of Cambridge VSO and a board member of the Cambridge Humanitarian Centre. She served as a Magistrate on the Cambridge Bench from 1992-2009.

Subsequent to her time at Hughes Hall she has been, from 2015–16, joint Chair of Cambridge for Europe, a grass roots organisation campaigning in Cambridge and its region for a Remain vote in the EU referendum; a member of Chapter and Canon of Ely Cathedral; and a trustee of United Learning and the United Church Schools Trust, a governor of two local schools and a trustee of The Bell Trust, Cambridge. She is currently Deputy High Steward of Cambridge University and a member of the Executive of Cambridge Liberal Democrats

== Family ==
Her husband, William Squire, died in 2021. He was British Ambassador to Senegal (1979–1982) and to Israel (1984–1988), the first Director of Development of Cambridge University, and Chairman and Director (Europe) of Grenzebach Glier. She has a son and a daughter and three stepchildren.

== Notes ==
Academic offices
Preceded by Peter Richards	President of Hughes Hall, Cambridge; 2006 to 2014	Succeeded by Anthony Freeling
