= Ana Irene Delgado =

Panamanian lawyer, diplomat, and politician

Her Excellency Ana Irene Delgado
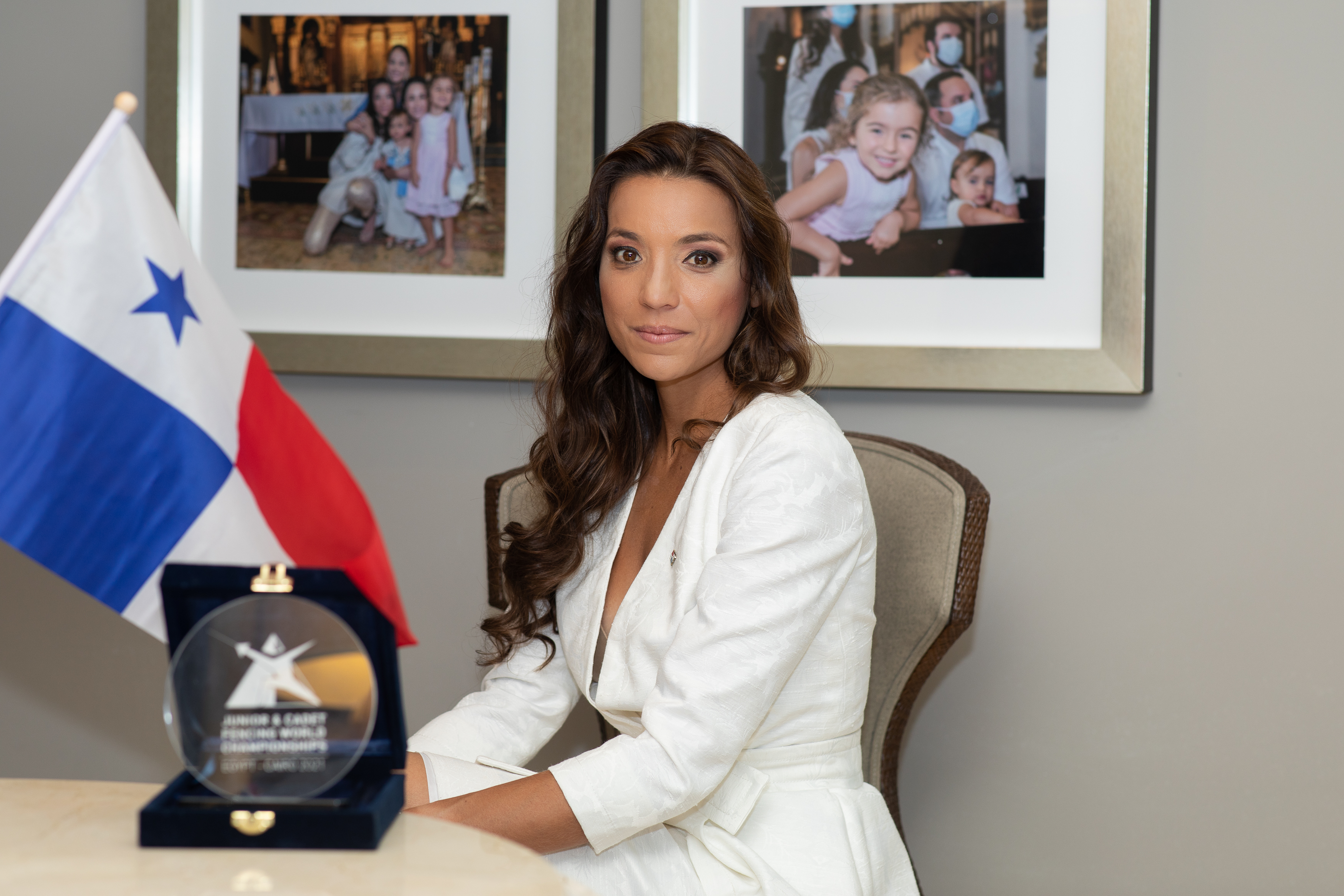
- Delgado in 2021

Panamanian Ambassador to the United Kingdom and Panama
- In office 11 November 2011 – June 2014
- President: Ricardo Martinelli; Juan Carlos Varela
- Preceded by: Gilberto Arias
- Succeeded by: Daniel Eduardo Fábrega Venier

Panamanian Ambassador to Ireland
- In office 11 November 2011 – June 2014
- President: Ricardo Martinelli
- Preceded by: Gilberto Arias
- Succeeded by: Daniel Eduardo Fábrega Venier

Personal details
- Born: 18 April 1982 (age 44) Panama City, Panama
- Relations: Hernán Delgado Quintero (father)
- Education: Santa Maria La Antigua University; Florida State University; New York University School of Law; Stern School of Business
- Profession: Panama Alternate Senator and lawyer

Ana Irene Delgado (born 18 April 1982) is a Panamanian lawyer, diplomat, and politician. Currently is the Ambassador of Panama to the Organization of American States, She also was the youngest Panamanian Ambassador to the United Kingdom, the Ireland and Iceland as well as Panama's Representative to the International Maritime Organization from November 2011 to June 2014. She was the first ever Panama Ambassador who presented credentials to Ireland and Panamanian Ambassador to Iceland. She was elected Vice President of International Maritime Assembly and member of the board of directors of the International Maritime Organization. Succeeded by Mr. Daniel Eduardo Fábrega Venier. During Delgado's term the UK became the largest investor in Panama.

Ana Irene Delgado is an elected member of the executive committee of the International Fencing Federation.

== Education ==
Delgado completed a BSc in Law and Political Science at Santa Maria La Antigua University in 2004 before gaining an LL.M. at New York University School of Law in 2006. She also holds a BSc in International Affairs with Specialization in Economics from Florida State University and an Advanced Professional Certificate in Law, Business, Finance and Economics from the Stern School of Business. She is fluent in Spanish, English and French. Delgado was admitted to Stanford MBA program in 2012.

== Career ==
Delgado is a partner at Solis, Endara, Delgado & Guevara Law Firm. She is the managing partner of the firm in London since 2018, where she worked up until her ambassadorial appointment. Delgado is member of the Board or New York University and is an active contributor to NYU's worldwide activities.

She is a recipient of the Constantine Order of Saint George as a Dame.

Delgado is also a recipient of Accademia Internazionale di Scienze Sociali per L'Industria, il Commercio e L'Artigianato de Palermo as an Accademico.

She is an active member of the Panamanian Association of Friendship with the People's Republic of China; The Panama Bar Association, Movimiento de Abogados Gremialistas (her father is the founder), Panamanian chamber of Commerce, British Panama Chamber of Commerce, and Panamanian Association of Executives and Industrialists (APEDE) and the Panama Representative of the Iberoamerican Institute of Law and Finance.

Advisor to Euro partnerships.

== Personal life ==
A keen fencer and equestrian, Delgado has also represented Panama in fencing in the Bolivarian Games, Fencing World Cups and the Central American and Caribbean Games. She continues to train at the Lansdowne Club with members of the British Olympic team. She works closely with International fencing Federation and International Olympic Committee. Delgado is also a keen long-distance runner.

Delgado is on the advisory board of OneSqin Foundation that among other activities help girls in need.

Delgado works closely with the Panamanian community and specially children from Panama East, Chepo, Chiman, Balboa and Taboga Constituency thru Fundacion La Providencia. Children thru art, culture and education.
