= Margaret Wileman =

British academic administrator, lecturer

Principal of Hughes Hall, Cambridge
- In office 1953–1973
- Preceded by: Eleanor Marguerite Verini
- Succeeded by: Desmond Lee

Personal details
- Born: Margaret Annie Wileman; 19 July 1908
- Died: 12 August 2014 (aged 106)
- Education: Lady Margaret Hall, Oxford; University of Paris
- Awards: Ordre des Palmes Académiques (France)

Margaret Annie Wileman (19 July 1908 – 12 August 2014) was a British academic administrator, lecturer in education, and teacher. From 1953 to 1973, she was Principal of Hughes Hall, Cambridge, and a lecturer in education at the Faculty of Education, University of Cambridge. She had previously taught at The Abbey School, Reading, and at Queen's College, London; two all-girls private schools. She had also lectured at St Katherine's College, Warrington, and at Bedford College, University of London

== Early life and education ==
Wileman was born on 19 July 1908 to Clement Wileman and Alice Wileman (née Brinson). In 1927, having won a scholarship to study modern languages, she matriculated into Lady Margaret Hall, Oxford. In 1930, she graduated from the University of Oxford with a first class Bachelor of Arts (BA) degree; as per tradition, her BA was later promoted to a Master of Arts (MA Oxon) degree. She then trained as a teacher at the Department of Education, University of Oxford. In 1931, she was awarded the Zaharoff Travelling Scholarship and studied at the University of Paris.

== Career ==
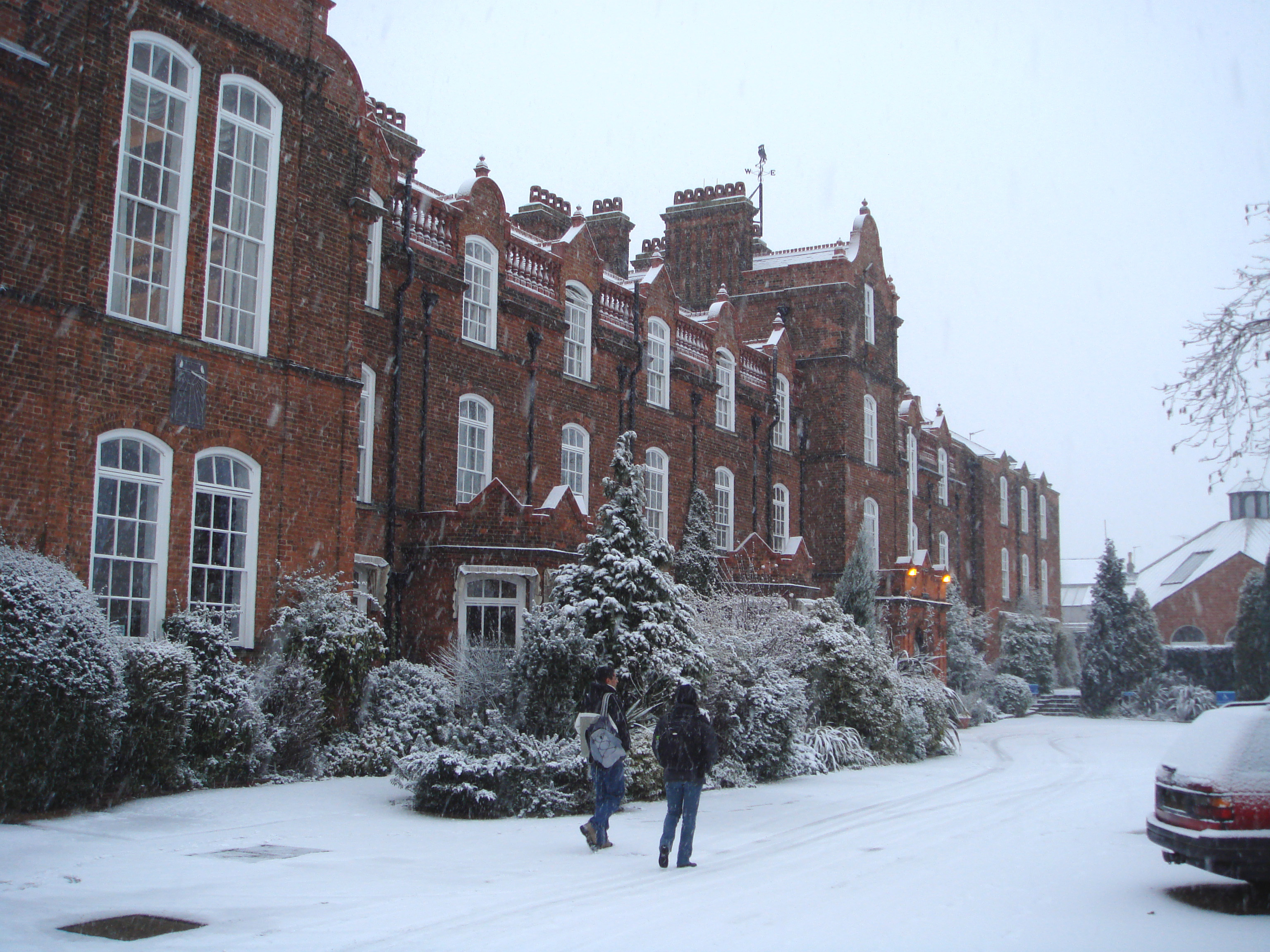
The Margaret Wileman Building of Hughes Hall, Cambridge

Wileman's early career was spent as a school teacher. From 1931 to 1937, she was an assistant at The Abbey School, Reading, an all-girls private school in Reading. Then, from 1937 to 1940, she was Senior Tutor at Queen's College, London, an all-girls independent school in the City of Westminster.

In 1940, Wileman moved into academia and became a lecturer at St Katherine's College, a university college in Warrington, Cheshire that offered higher education to women. In 1944, she moved to Bedford College, University of London. There, she was a tutor and resident warden until she moved to Oxford.

In 1953, Wileman was appointed Principal of Hughes Hall, Cambridge. At the time, Hughes Hall was all-female and the smallest college of the University of Cambridge with a maximum of 70 students. Under her leadership, the college began accepting students to study for degrees in addition to education, she greatly increased the number of students, and the college became the first all-women college to accept male students in 1973. In addition to heading a college, she was a university lecturer in education and Director of Women Students in the Faculty of Education.

Wileman retired in 1973 and was appointed an honorary fellow of Hughes Hall, Cambridge. She died on 12 August 2014, aged 106.

== Personal life ==
Wileman never married. She was a devout Roman Catholic, and in her retirement she administered educational programmes for nuns alongside Sister Gregory Kirkus.

== Honours ==
In 2000, she was appointed an Officier de l'Ordre des Palmes Académiques by the French government "in recognition of her services to French literature". The main building of Hughes Hall, Cambridge was renamed in her honour and is now the Margaret Wileman Building.

Academic offices
Preceded by Eleanor Marguerite Verini	Principal of Hughes Hall, Cambridge; 1953 to 1973	Succeeded by Desmond Lee
