= Margaret Punnett =

English teacher trainer (1867–1946)

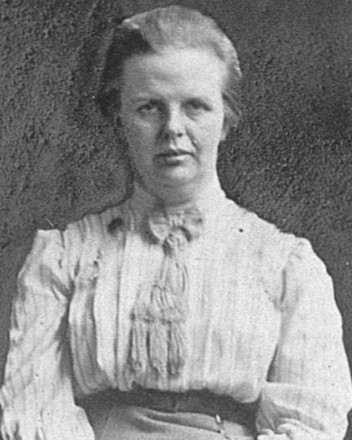
- Margaret Punnett in about 1905

Principal of Hughes Hall, Cambridge
- In office 1900–1902
- Preceded by: Elizabeth Hughes
- Succeeded by: Helena Powell

Personal details
- Born: 1867 Skirbeck
- Died: 1946 (aged 78–79) St Briavels
- Education: Hughes Hall, Cambridge
- Occupation: Vice-principal of Institute of Education, 1905-1933

Margaret Punnett (1867–1946) was an English teacher and teacher trainer. After briefly serving as the second Principal of Hughes Hall, Cambridge, she spent twenty-eight years as vice-principal of the Institute of Education and was responsible for much of the teaching and administration there.

== Early life and education ==
She was born in Skirbeck, Lincolnshire in 1867 to former teacher and produce broker John Trefusis Punnett and his wife Louisa, née Bulpett.

Educated at South Hampstead High School, she received a B.A.in German and Mathematics from the University of London in 1889.

In 1892, she received a Gilchrist scholarship to study at the Cambridge Training College for Women (later Hughes Hall). She also received certification from the Cambridge Teachers’ Training Syndicate and the London Teachers’ Diploma in 1893.

== Teaching career ==
In 1893 she was appointed as a teacher at the Saffron Walden Training College and School.

In 1900, she was appointed as the second Principal of Hughes Hall. She left the post in 1902.

In 1902, she was appointed Normal Mistress at the newly established London Day Training College, which later became the Institute of Education. She was appointed vice-principal there in 1905. Her role included lecturing in teaching methods, arithmetic, psychology, and scripture; and administrative duties, including responsibility for the women students. During World War I, she worked alongside Percy Nunn to select Practice Schools for teacher training. Her industriousness resulted in a student song: ‘If owt's been dunn ‘ere, Miss Punnett's dunnit’. She retired in 1933, and two people were appointed to replace her.

In 1913, she published The Groundwork of Arithmetic—A Handbook for Teachers.

== Death and legacy ==
After retiring, she lived with her sister in St Briavels in the Forest of Dean. She died in 1946.

In 2024, the Institute of Education renamed its drama studio Punnett Hall in recognition of Margaret Punnett's work training teachers at UCL. This was the first instance of the IOE naming a room after a woman.
