= Hughes Hall, Cambridge =

Constituent college of the University of Cambridge

Coordinates: 52.2009°N 0.1325°E

Hughes Hall
- University of Cambridge
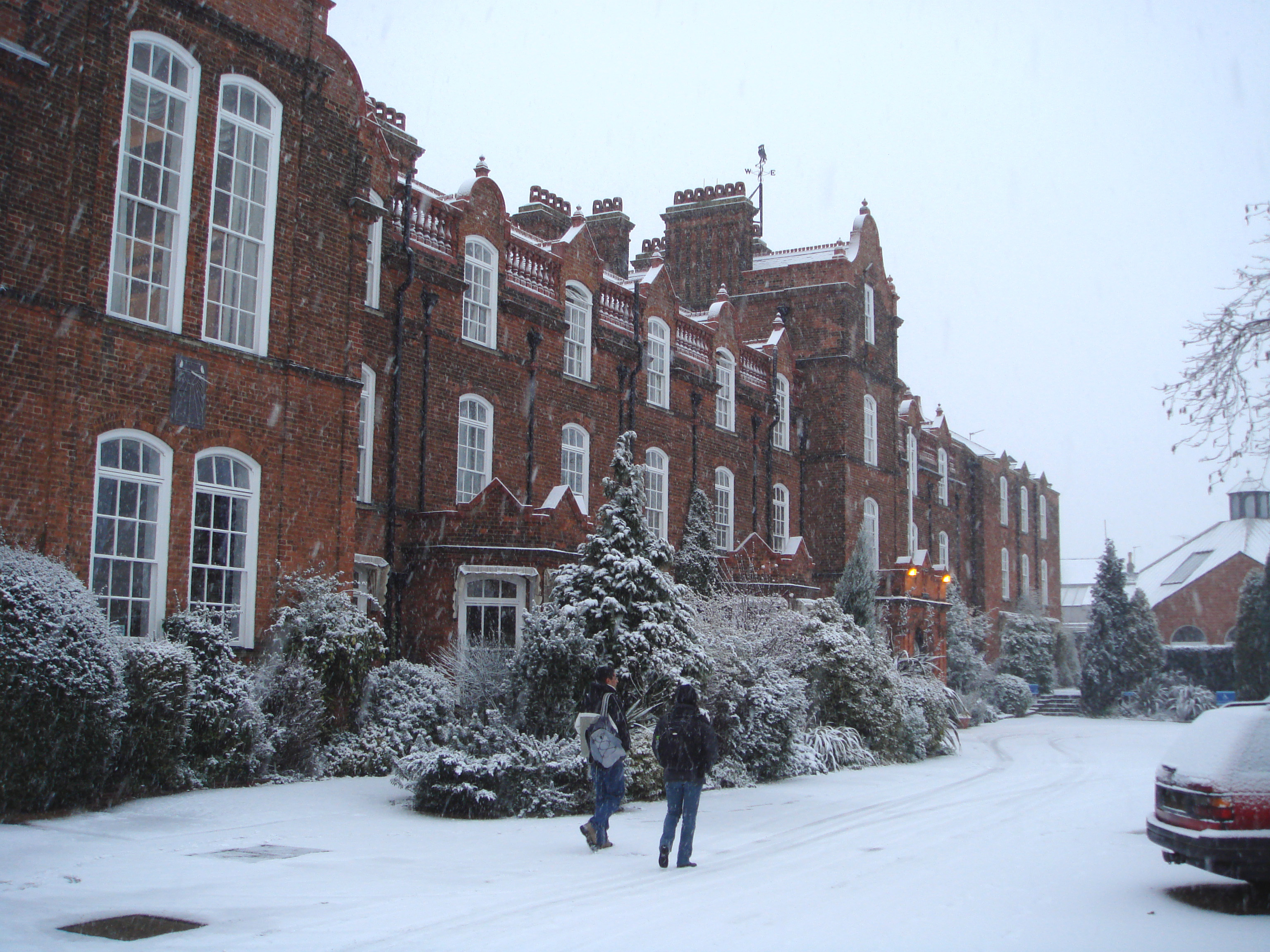
- Margaret Wileman Building, Hughes Hall

- Arms: Quarterly 1st and 3rd Gules an owl proper Or.; 5th Gules a torch proper Sable; 2nd, 4th and 6th Ermine
Scarf colours: light blue with three equally-spaced narrow stripes, the outer stripes of Cambridge blue and wider, the central stripe of white and narrower
- Location: Mortimer Road (map)
- Full name: Hughes Hall in the University of Cambridge
- Abbreviation: HH
- Motto: Disce ut Servias (Latin)
- Motto in English: Learn in order to serve
- Established: 1885
- Named after: Elizabeth Phillips Hughes
- Former names: Cambridge Training College for Women (1885-1950); Elizabeth Phillips Hughes Hall Company (1950-2006)
- Sister college: Linacre College, Oxford
- President: Sir Laurie Bristow
- Undergraduates: 201 (2022-23)
- Postgraduates: 775 (2022-23)
- Endowment: £8.2m (2023)
- Website: www.hughes.cam.ac.uk
- MCR: mcr.hughes.cam.ac.uk
- Boat club: Hughes Hall Boat Club

Map
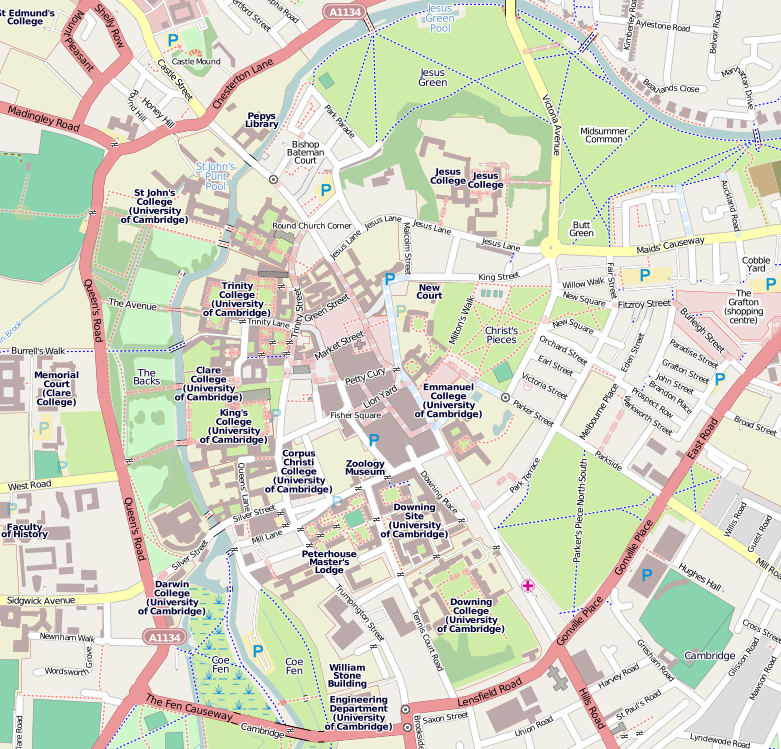
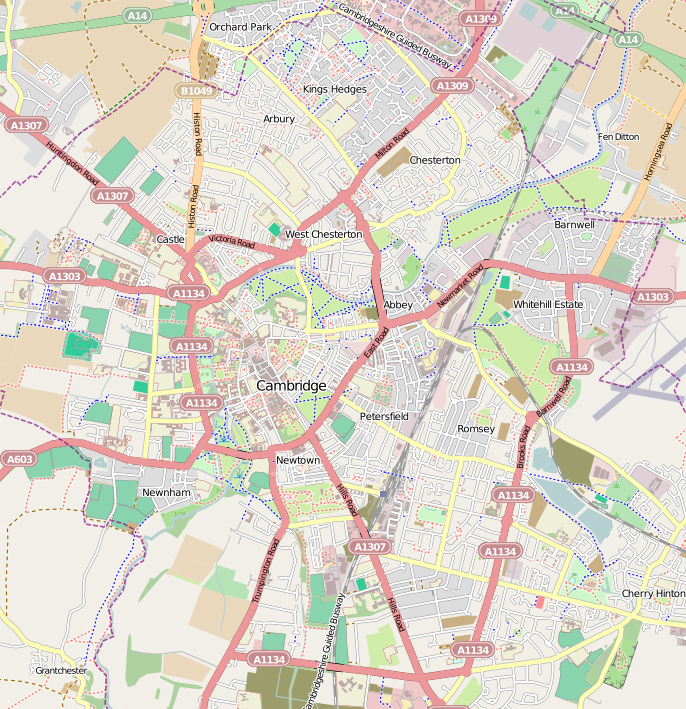
- Location within Central Cambridge Location within Cambridge

Hughes Hall is a constituent college of the University of Cambridge in England. The majority of students are postgraduate, although nearly one-fifth of the student population comprises individuals aged 21 and above who are studying undergraduate degree courses. Hughes Hall was founded in the 19th century as the Cambridge Training College for Women with the purpose of providing a college dedicated to training women graduates for the teaching profession. Since then it has enlarged and expanded to support a community of students and researchers, both male and female, working in all the academic areas of the university. It is a registered charity.

The college is housed in a number of 19th- and 20th-century buildings at a main site adjacent to Fenner's, the Cambridge University Cricket Club ground, and between the city centre and the railway station.

== History ==
In 1878 the University of Cambridge established a Teachers' Training Syndicate to develop a training curriculum in education for students of the university intending to become teachers. Hughes Hall was established in 1885 as a college for women graduate students taking the Teacher Training curriculum. Key amongst its early supporters and founders were Rev. G. F. Browne, fellow of St Catharine's College, Miss Frances Buss, headmistress of the North London Collegiate School, Miss Anne Clough, first principal of Newnham College, and Professor James Ward, fellow of Trinity College.

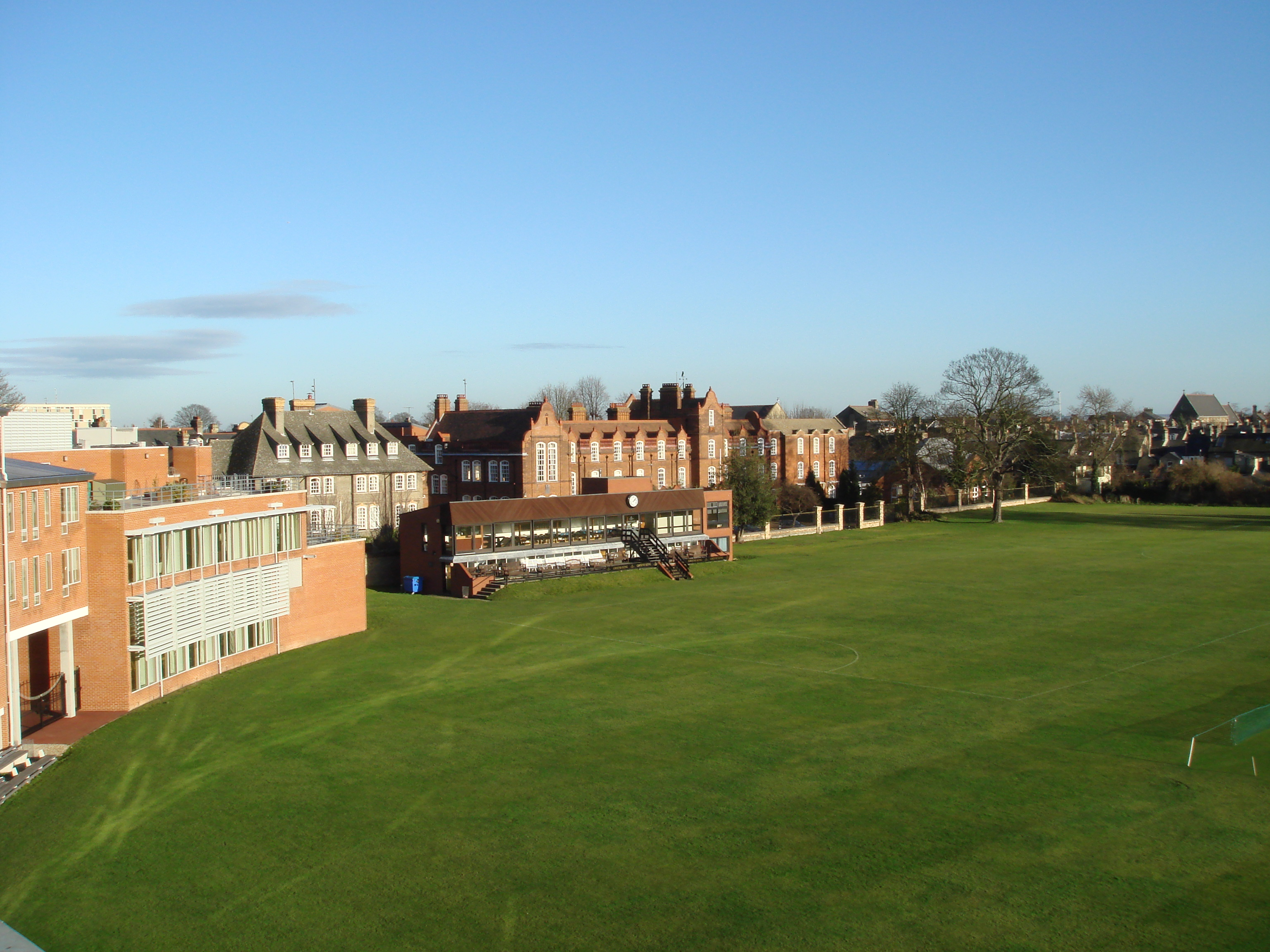
Fenner's cricket ground, Hughes Hall

The college was founded as the Cambridge Training College for Women, and it began with 14 students in a small house in Newnham called Crofton Cottage. The first principal was a graduate of Newnham College, Elizabeth Phillips Hughes (1851-1925), who was in post from 1885 to 1899. In 1895, the college moved to a purpose-built building, designed by architect William Fawcett, overlooking Fenner's cricket ground - which continues to be the main college building to this day. One of the first matriculants, Molly Thomas, recounted the experience of the first class of students in A London Girl of the 1880s, published under her married name, M.V. Hughes.

Following recognition of full membership of the university for women in 1947, the college became a recognized institution of the university in 1949 and was renamed Hughes Hall in honour of its first principal. The college became an approved foundation of the university in 1985, and received a royal charter marking its full college status in 2006.

The college's first male students arrived in 1973, making Hughes Hall the first of the all-female colleges to admit men, and from that time students began to study a wider range of affiliated post-graduate degrees. Student numbers gradually increased in the 1980s and 1990s. Today, Hughes Hall has about 700 graduate students and around 200 undergraduates, all students are "mature" (aged over 21), and the college accommodates study in the wide range of studies taught in the university. The college is one of the most international Cambridge colleges, with its students representing over 60 nationalities.

In November 2019, Prince Andrew, as he then was, resigned as an honorary fellow of Hughes Hall amid the Jeffrey Epstein scandal.

== College site ==
=== Buildings ===
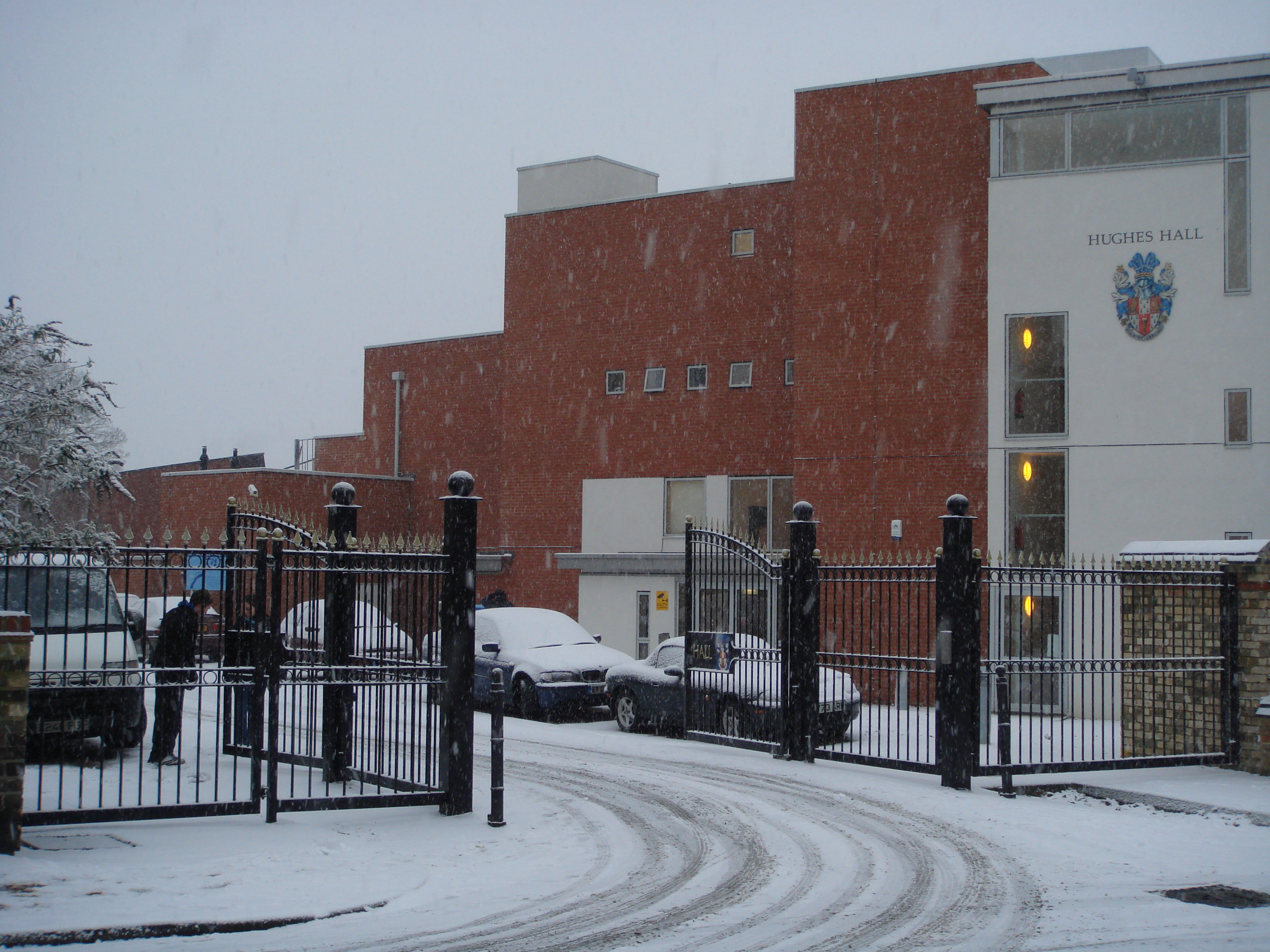
Entrance and Fenner's, Hughes Hall

The college's main building, known as the Wileman Building, was designed by architect William Fawcett and built in 1895. It was opened by Liberal politician George Robinson, 1st Marquess of Ripon. The building is Grade II listed, red brick in Neo-Dutch style, and has a notable terracotta porch. One wing of the Wileman Building is named the Pfeiffer Wing, after husband and wife Jurgen Edward Pfeiffer and Emily Jane Pfeiffer who funded much of the construction cost as part of their mission to support and develop women's education. The building, and its more modern wings, contains student rooms, the college library, social areas and study spaces, and various college administrative offices. Next door to the Wileman Building is Wollaston Lodge, a symmetrical early-20th-century building in buff brick, designed by Edward Schroeder Prior, that provides further student accommodation.

More recent buildings on the college site, all of which provide accommodation and other facilities for students, include Chancellor’s Court, inaugurated in 1992 by the then Chancellor of the University, the Duke of Edinburgh, and the Centenary Building, which opened in 1997. In 2005 Hughes opened a new residential, dining, and meeting building, the Fenner's Building, which is beside and overlooks the university cricket ground, also named Fenner's. It is possible to see the spire of the Our Lady and the English Martyrs Church—the tallest church spire in Cambridge—from the building's west-facing windows and terraces. The college also owns a number of houses in the nearby area which provide additional student accommodation.

In 2014 the college acquired the former Cambridge University gym building on Gresham Road, which is across the cricket ground from the main college site, to develop as a new facility—construction began on the site in 2015.

=== Location ===
The main college site is near the middle of Cambridge, halfway between Cambridge railway station and the Market Square. The college is located in the Petersfield area of the city, close to Mill Road and accessible from Mortimer Road. The main site is in a mainly residential area, and it is beside the Fenner's cricket ground, and across the road from Parkside Pools and Kelsey Kerridge Gym, which are the main public sports facilities in the city. A short walk from the college is the Mill Road Cemetery where a number of the university's renowned historic figures, including astronomer James Challis, Isaac Newton's editor Percival Frost, and historian John Seeley are buried.

==== Transport links ====
Hughes Hall is the nearest of the university's colleges to Cambridge railway station and to the main city centre arrival-departure point for long-distances coaches at Parkside. The most direct access route from the college into the centre of Cambridge for cyclists and pedestrians is across Parker's Piece, an open park where the rules of football were first codified (1848).

== Student life ==
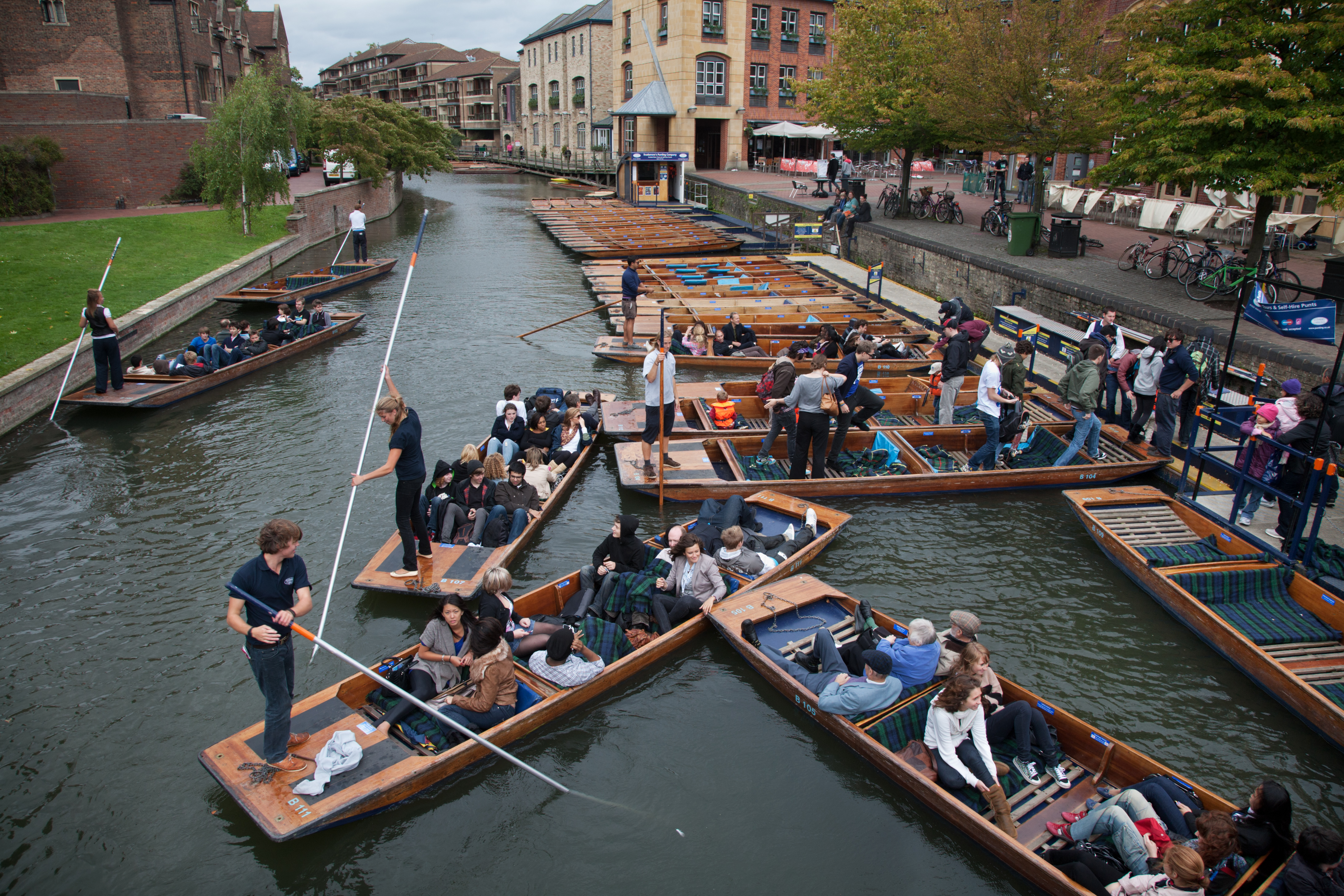
Punting on the River Cam in Cambridge

Students and fellows of the college take part in research and study across the full spectrum of the University of Cambridge's fields of activity. Hughes Hall is known for its international and egalitarian ethos, the college does not have a high table. Students can walk on college lawns.

The college's historic establishment in the 19th century with the purpose of supporting graduate study in education has continued and developed over time with a significant number of students each year taking courses in professional and applied fields, alongside those studying and carrying out research in more traditional Arts and Humanities subjects. With a mainly postgraduate student body, undergraduates share facilities and an intellectual culture with PhD researchers and MPhil students.

=== Societies and sports ===
Hughes Hall has an active student sports calendar with college teams in Athletics, Badminton, Basketball, Cricket, Football, Rowing, Rugby, Squash, Table Tennis, and others. Members of the college are also active in sports and teams at university and national level.

There are a number of college societies, including a Chess Club, Film Society, Writing Group, and Law Society amongst others. The college's "Hat Club" organises events where students and fellows present papers on their research and study to an audience of college members, and the Enterprise Society supports and encourages students with an interest in starting their own business.

==== Music ====
The college's main performance space is the Pavilion Room which hosts a number of regular musical groups and organizations. The Stradivari Trust, the Cambridge Graduate Orchestra, and the college's Margaret Wileman Society use the space on a regular basis. There is also a programme of ad hoc student recitals and concerts, including by the college choir which incorporates students and fellows of the college.

==== Boat Club ====
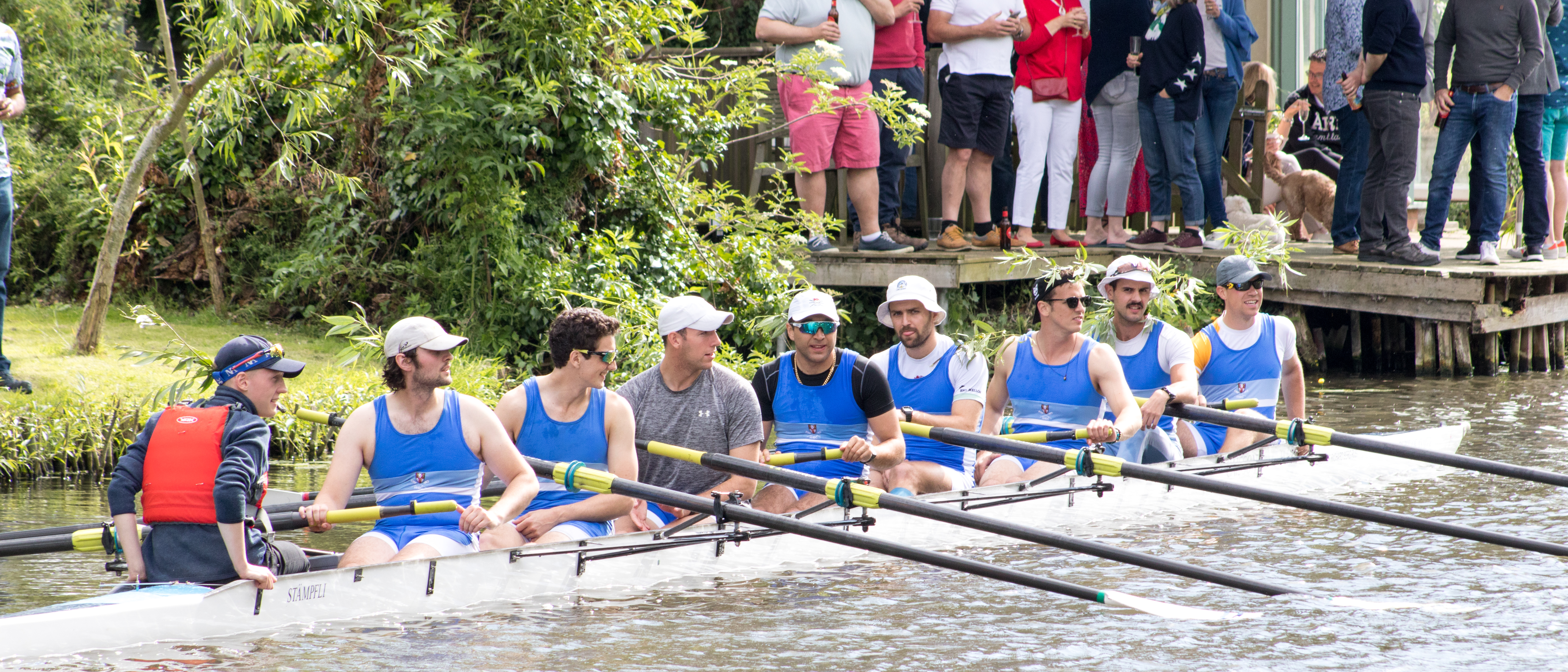
Hughes Hall M1 Rowers, May Bumps 2019

Hughes Hall Boat Club is the rowing club of the college. In 2003 there was an official merger with the boat club of Lucy Cavendish College (then a graduate women-only college of the university) creating the "Hughes Hall/Lucy Cavendish Combined Boat Club".

The Club has been successful in the May Bumps with the men's first crew winning blades (a distinction accorded to a boat bumping each day of the bumps) in 1993, 1995, 1996, 1997, 2001, 2002, 2003, 2004, 2007, 2009, 2011, 2013 and 2014. Uniquely, the Club has been recipient of the Pegasus Cup, awarded to the most successful college boat club competing in the May Bumps each year, three times (2007, 2009, 2014). The women's first crew won blades for the first time after the demerger from Lucy Cavendish in the Lent Bumps 2019.

Members of Hughes Hall have regularly been selected for the Cambridge team in the Oxford-Cambridge Boat Race. In 2015, the men's team included three members of Hughes Hall (Jasper Holst, Ben Ruble, Henry Hoffstot), and the women's boat was coxed by a member of the college (Rosemary Ostfeld). Henry Hoffstot also appeared for Cambridge in the Race in 2014. In 2019, two members of the Cambridge Blue Crew were present in the men's first crew for May Bumps, including Cambridge University Boat Club President Dara Alizadeh. Also present in the boat was Cambridge University Boat Club rower Grant Bitler and Spare-Pair rower Harry Baxter.

The Boat Club houses its six rowing shells in the Emmanuel College boathouse.

==== City Lecture ====
Since 2000, Hughes Hall have hosted the annual City Lecture, featuring prominent leaders from the business community including Andrew Bailey, Lionel Barber and Sir Martin Sorrell. In 2006, business executive and founder Stephen Allott coined the term "person centric approach" as part of his lecture 'From Science to Growth'. The lecture set out an alternative to the innovation machine model.

==== May ball ====
Hughes Hall holds a May ball each year, often with a global or international theme.

== Notable members ==
=== Principals/Presidents ===
The college's head was titled as "Principal" until 1973, and subsequently as "President".

==== Principals ====
- 1885–1899: Elizabeth Hughes
- 1899–1902: Margaret Punnett
- 1902–1908: Helena Powell
- 1908–1933: Mary Hay Wood
- 1933–1945: Henriette Dent
- 1945–1953: Marguerite Verini
- 1953–1973: Margaret Wileman

==== Presidents ====
- 1973–1978: Sir Desmond Lee
- 1978–1984: Richard D'Aeth
- 1984–1989: Basil Herbertson
- 1989–1993: Desmond Hawkins
- 1993–1998: John Dingle
- 1998–2006: Peter Richards
- 2006–2014: Sarah Squire
- 2014–2022: Anthony Freeling
- 2022: Laurie Bristow

=== Fellows ===
- Nevin Hughes-Jones, haematologist, Fellow of the Royal Society
- Neil Mercer, Professor of Education in the University of Cambridge
- Marc Weller, University of Cambridge Professor of International Law and International Constitutional Studies

=== Alumni ===
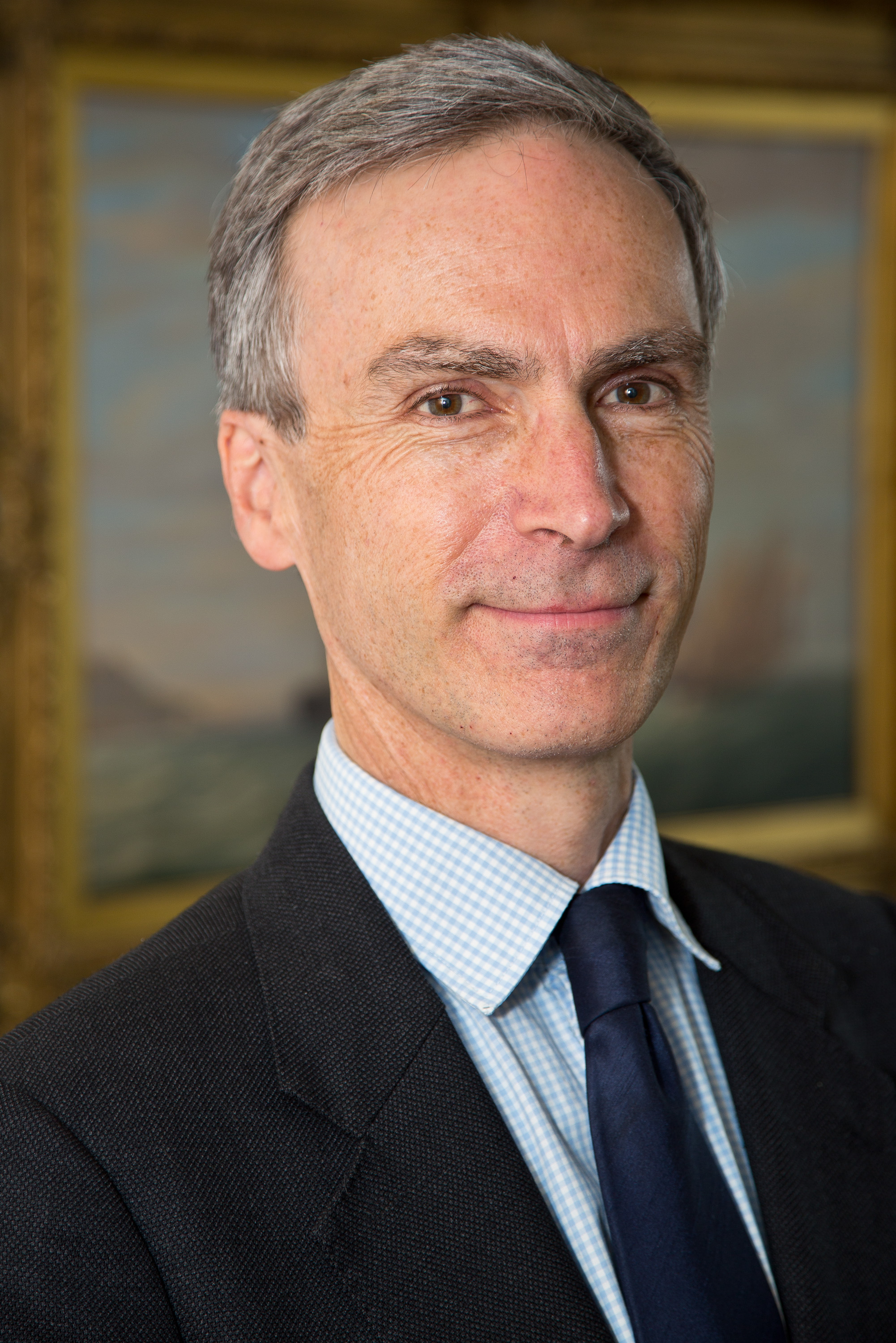
Andrew Murrison
Conservative Party politician, Minister of State for Northern Ireland

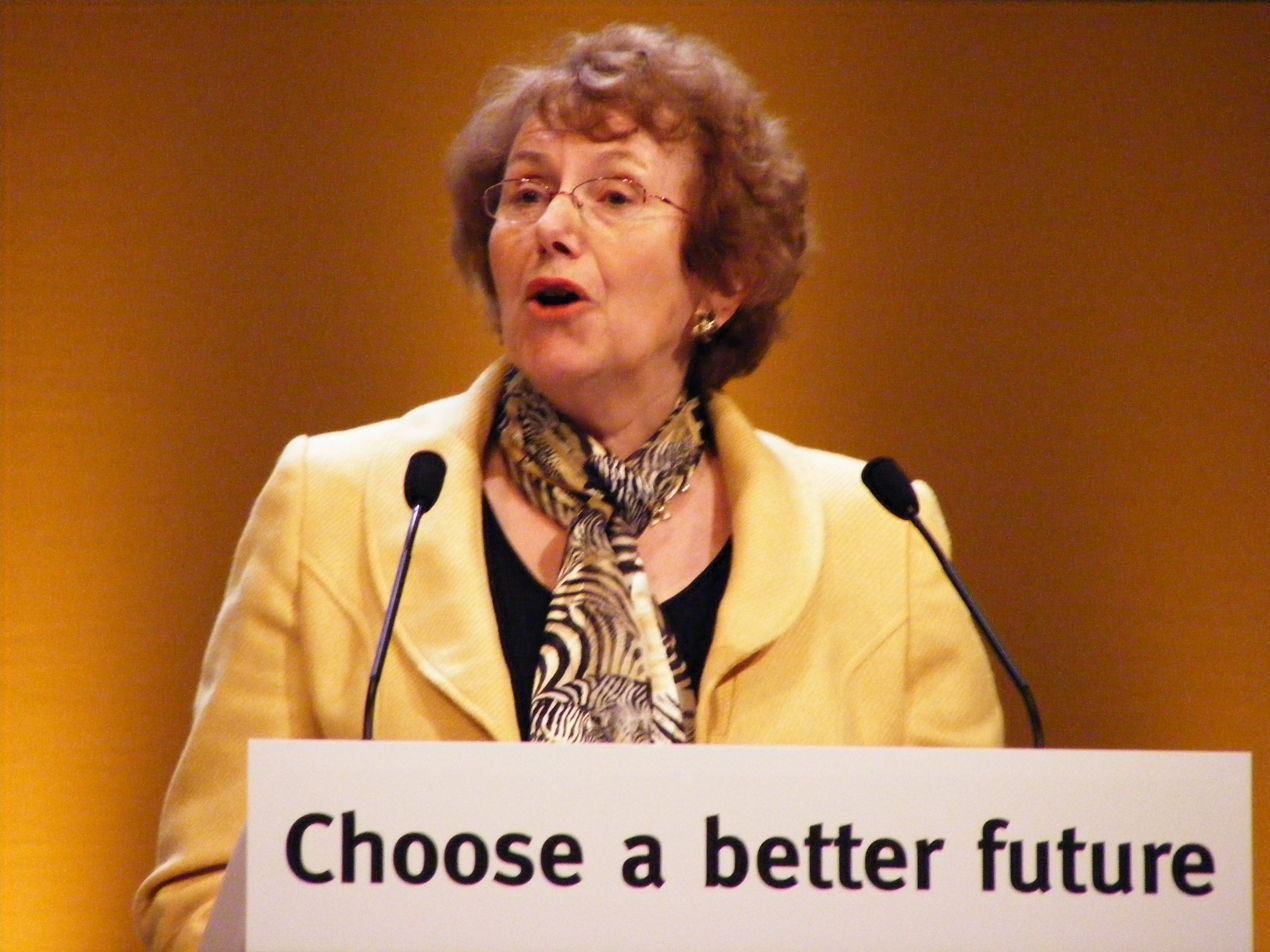
Annette Brooke
Liberal Democrats MP

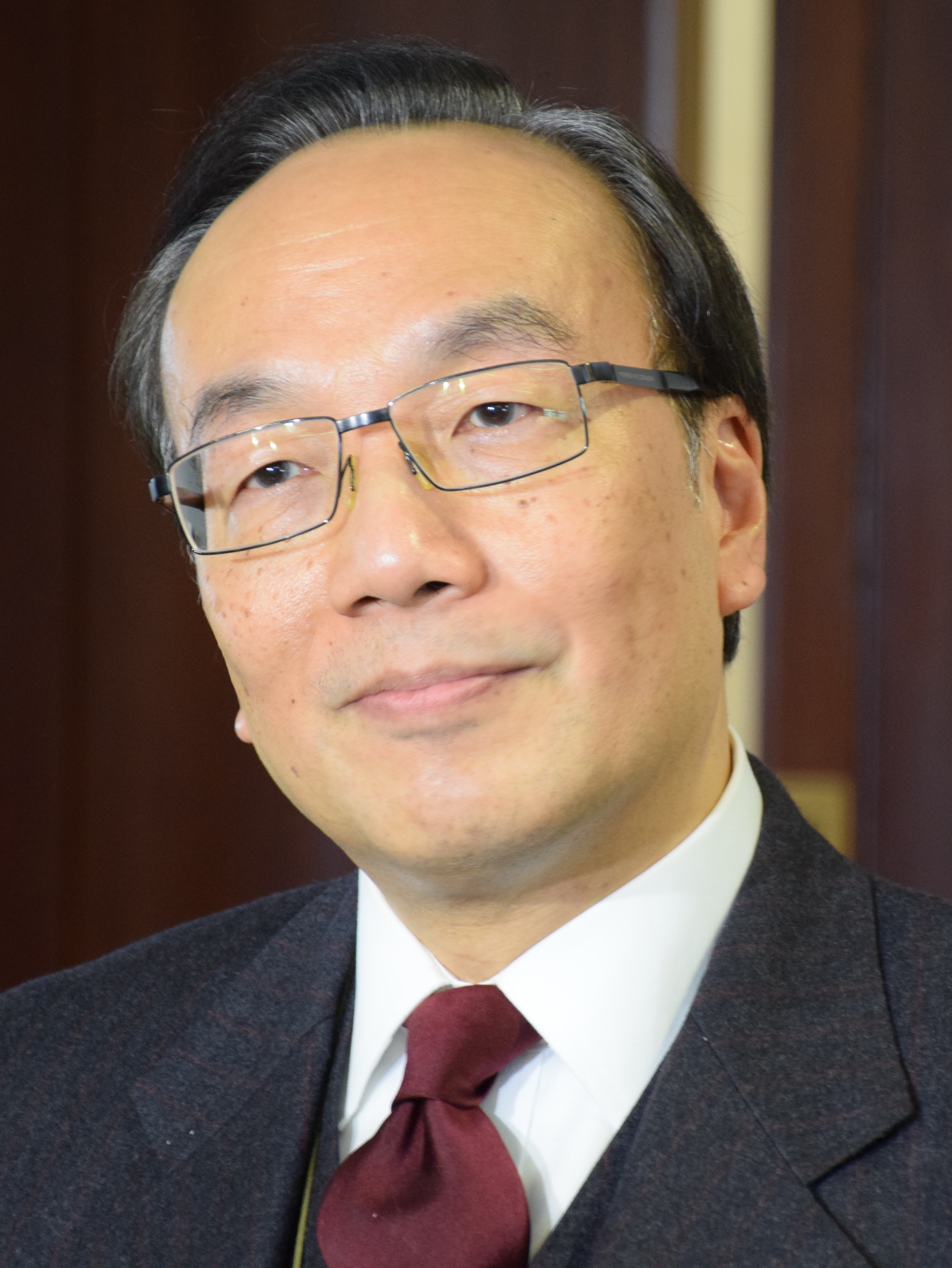
Alan Leong
Member of the Hong Kong Legislative Council and Leader of the Civic Party

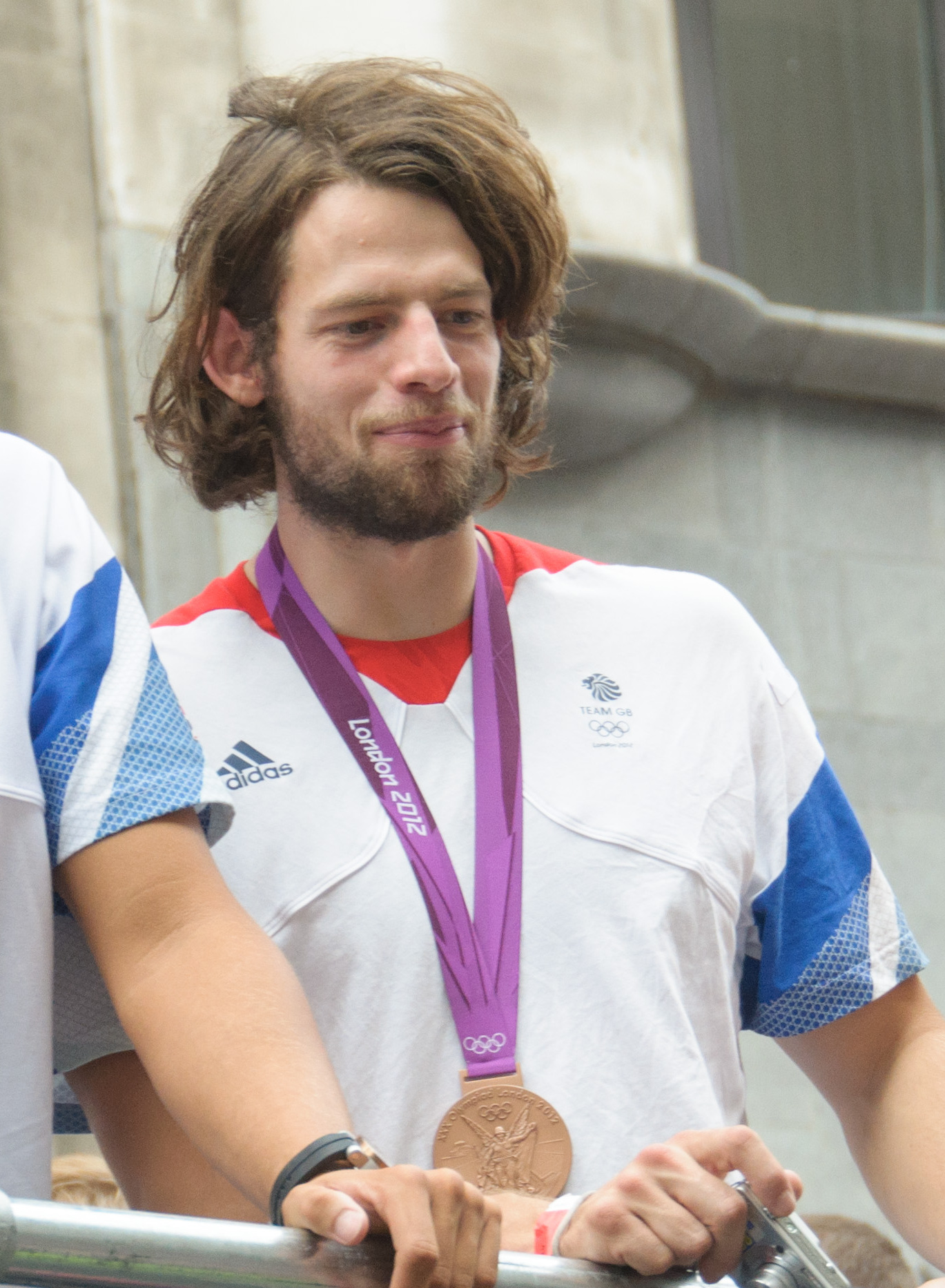
Tom Ransley
GB Rower, World Champion and Olympic Gold Medalist

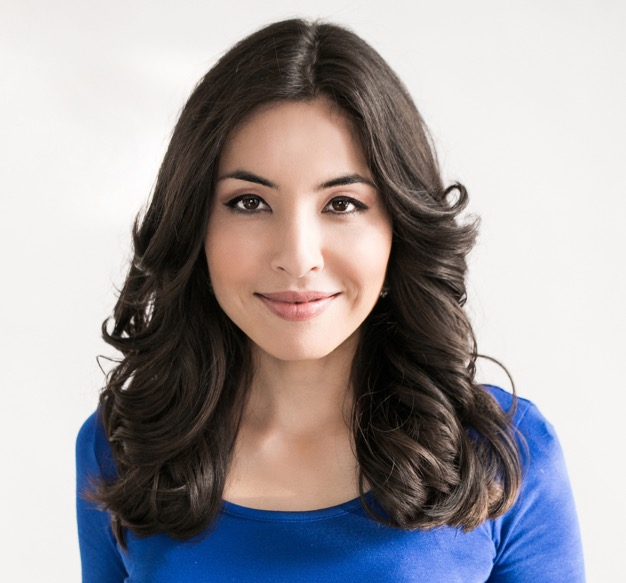
Roxana Saberi
American journalist for CBS News and former Miss North Dakota

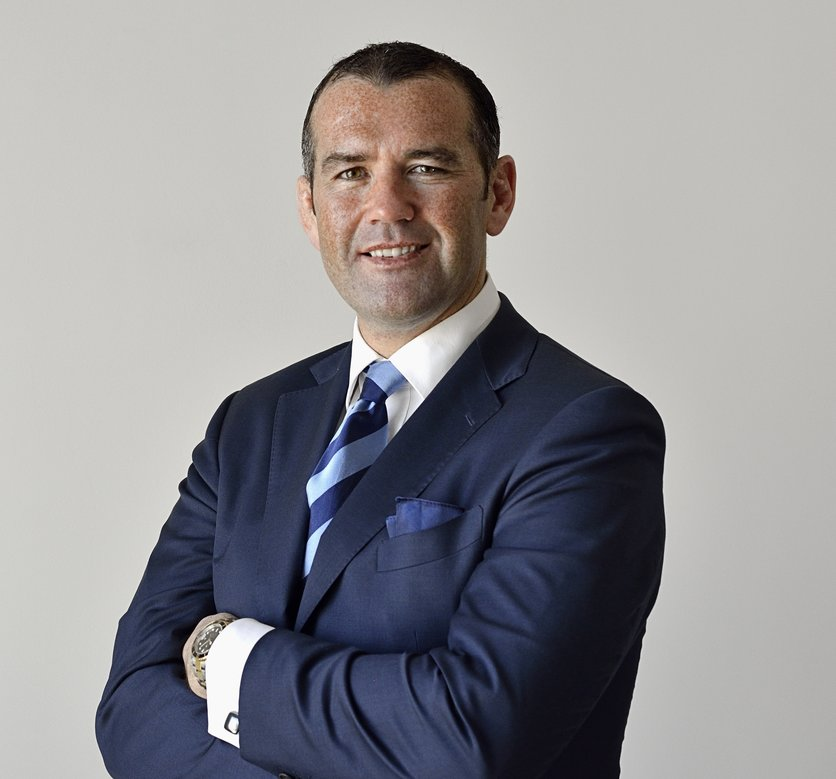
Liam Mooney
Monaco based businessman and entrepreneur

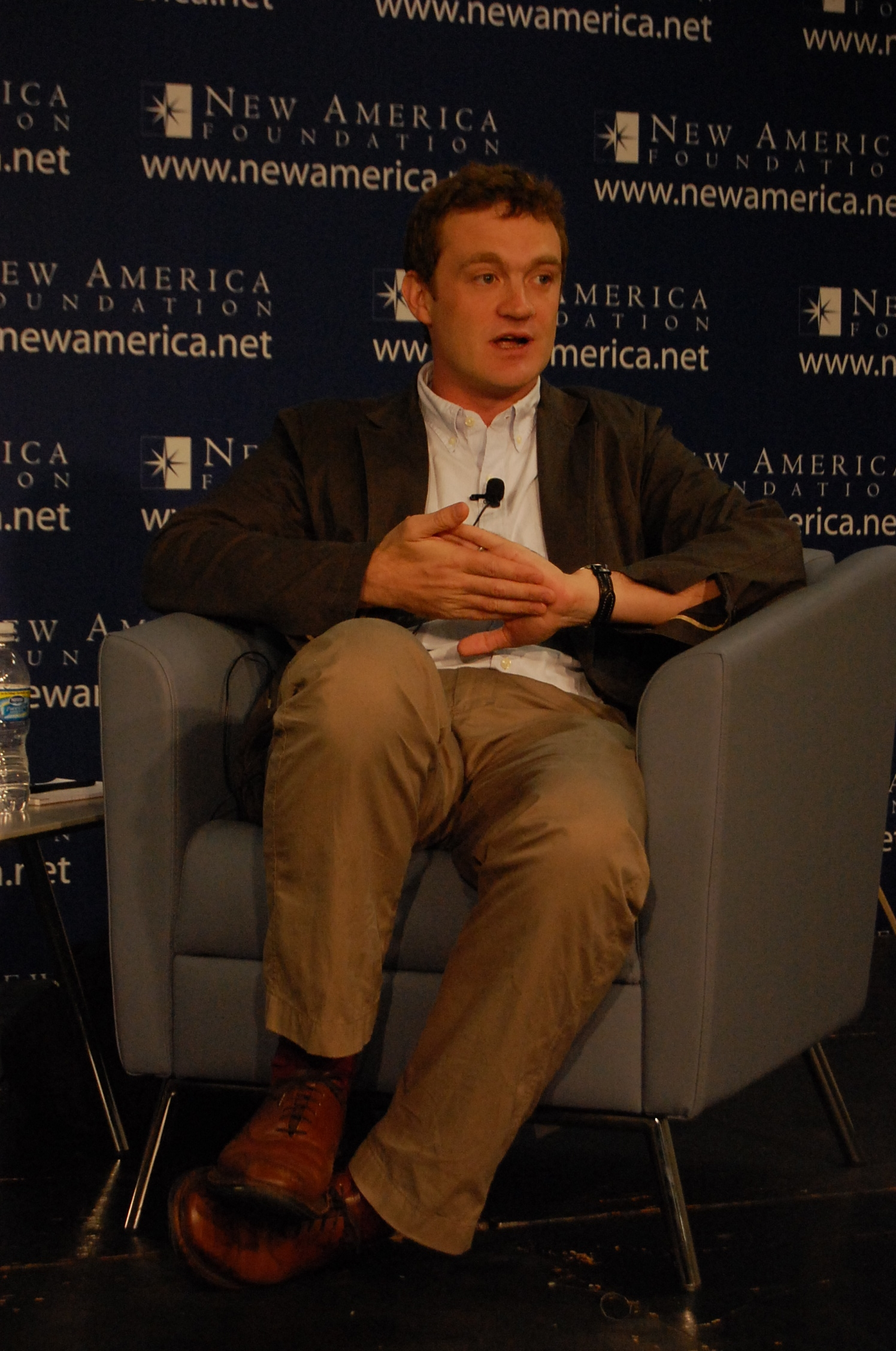
Patrick Radden Keefe
American writer and investigative journalist

Name	Birth	Death	Career
Gilberto Arias	1960		Former Ambassador of Panama to the United Kingdom
Mary Brebner	1858	1933	Lecturer at Aberystwyth University in Modern and Ancient Languages, and a major contributor to the reform of language teaching in Britain.
Annette Brooke	1947		Former Liberal Democrats MP for Mid Dorset and North Poole
Michael Gau			Vice Chairman of Aviation Safety Council of the Republic of China
Theo Hobson	1972		British theologian and writer
Anne Hollinghurst	1964		Bishop of Aston
Damian Hopley	1970		England rugby player
Mary Vivian Hughes	1866	1956	British educator and author whose books are a valuable source on women's education and women's work in the late Victorian period
Dorothy Jewson	1884	1964	Trade union organiser, Labour Party politician, and one of her party's first female Members of Parliament.
Ian Lambert	1960		Principal of Scots College, Sydney
Alan Leong	1958		Member of the Hong Kong Legislative Council and Leader of the Civic Party
Liam Mooney	1972		Monaco-based businessman and entrepreneur
Paula Marcela Moreno Zapata	1978		8th Colombian Minister of Culture; Hubert H. Humphrey Fellow, MIT
Andrew Murrison	1961		Conservative Party MP for Westbury and former Minister of State for Northern Ireland
Shane O'Mara	1982		American rower who represented the United States in sculling events in three World Rowing Championships and in two 2007 World Rowing Cup events.
Chan Seng Onn	1954		Justice of the Supreme Court of Singapore.
See Kee Oon	1966		Justice of the Supreme Court of Singapore and Presiding Judge of the State Courts of Singapore.
Chua Lee Ming			Justice of the Supreme Court of Singapore.
Eric Peters	1969		Scotland rugby player
Patrick Radden Keefe	1976		American writer and investigative journalist best known for books Say Nothing and Empire of Pain
Tom Ransley	1985		GB Rower, World Champion and Olympic Bronze Medalist
Andy Ripley	1947	2010	England rugby player
Mark Robinson	1974		Former New Zealand rugby player; Director of the New Zealand Rugby Union and General Manager of Symons Group
Roxana Saberi	1977		American journalist for CBS News and former Miss North Dakota pageant winner. Held prisoner in Iran's Evin Prison for 101 days under accusations of espionage.
Gábor Scheiring	1981		Economist and Member of the Hungarian National Assembly
Chris Sheasby	1966		Former England international rugby union player, now turned commentator and coach.
Doreen Simmons	1932	2018	Was an English sumo commentator. After moving to Japan in 1973 she became an expert on sumo and became known as "the voice of sumo wrestling". She was awarded the Order of the Rising Sun in 2017.
Netta Syrett	1865	1943	English writer of the late Victorian period
Choo Han Teck	1954		Justice of the Supreme Court of Singapore.
Tony Underwood	1969		England rugby player
Alison Uttley	1884	1976	British author of over 100 books. Best known for her children's series about Little Grey Rabbit, and Sam Pig.
Daniel Vickerman	1979	2017	Australian professional rugby union footballer who played for the Wallabies at the 2011 Rugby World Cup.
Evan Wallach	1949		Judge of the United States Court of Appeals for the Federal Circuit, former judge of the United States Court of International Trade, and one of the foremost experts of the United States on war crimes and the law of war.

=== Honorary Fellows ===
- Nigel Brown OBE, former chairman of N.W. Brown Group Ltd
- John Dingle, Director of the Strangeways Research Laboratory (1979–1993), President of Hughes Hall (1993–1998)
- Sir Terence English, pioneer transplant surgeon
- Hermann Hauser FRS, pioneer technology entrepreneur
- John Hopkins, former Cambridge University Lecturer in Law, former Hughes Hall Director of Studies in Law
- Dame Cleo Laine, jazz and pop singer, actress
- Peter Mansfield FRS, physicist and Nobel laureate
- Nicholas Phillips, Baron Phillips of Worth Matravers, President of the UK Supreme Court (2009–2012)
- Dame Janet Smith, former Judge of the High Court and Court of Appeal
- Evan Wallach, Judge of the United States Court of Appeals for the Federal Circuit
