= Desmond Lee (classical scholar) =

English classical scholar (1908–1993)

Sir Henry Desmond Pritchard Lee (30 August 1908 – 8 December 1993) was an English classical scholar specialising in ancient philosophy who became a Fellow and tutor of Corpus Christi College at Cambridge University, a lecturer in the university, and then Headmaster successively of Clifton College and Winchester College, before ending his career back at Cambridge University as President of Hughes Hall.

== Early life ==
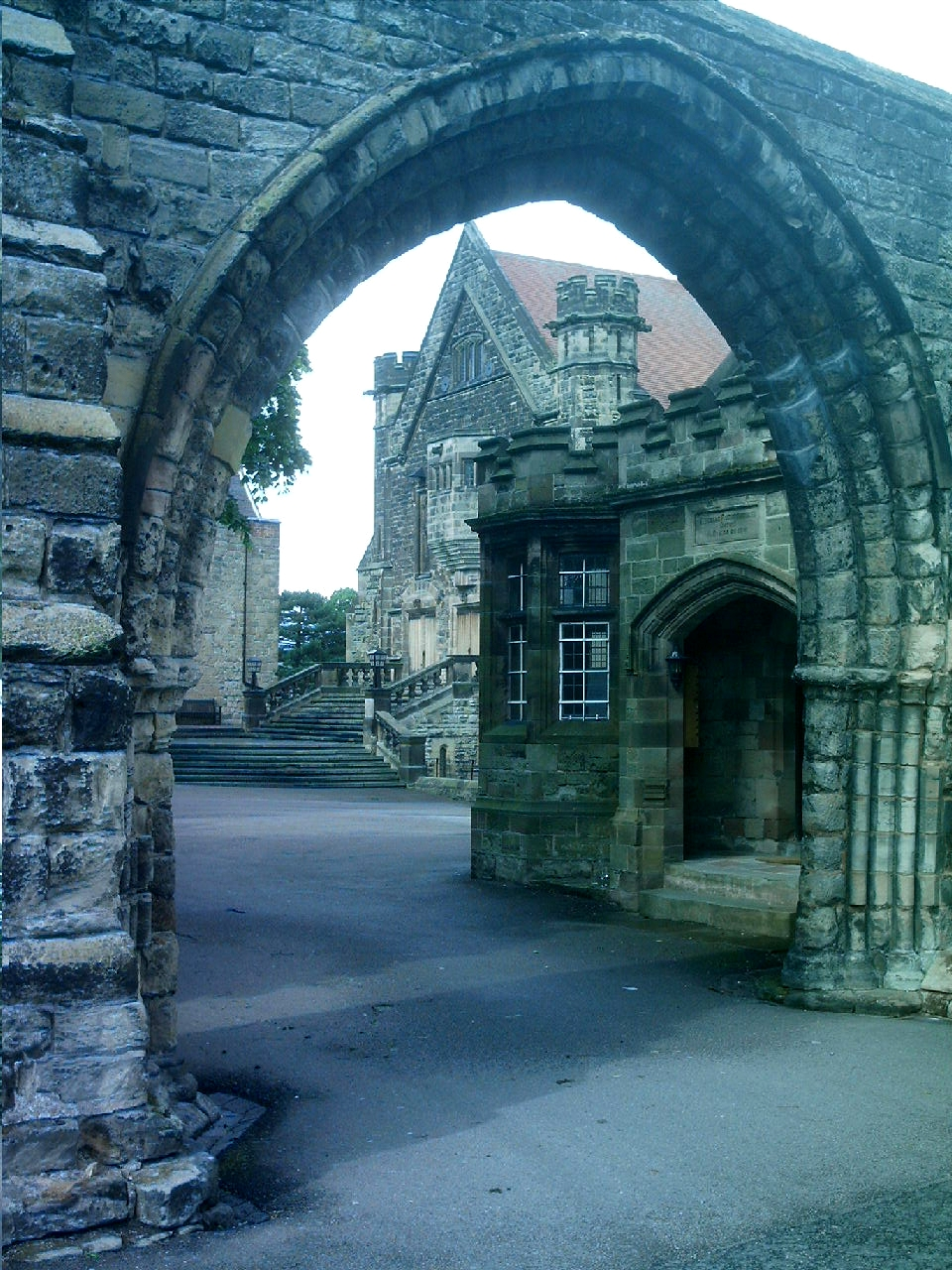
Repton School

Born in Nottingham, the son of the Rev. Canon Henry Burgass Lee, the young Lee was educated at Arden House, then at Repton School, where he held the George Denman scholarship, before going on to Corpus Christi College, Cambridge, where he was again a scholar and gained a Double First, with Firsts in Part 1 of the Classical Tripos in 1928 and in Part 2 in 1930. He also gained a Charles Oldham scholarship.

While he was still an undergraduate at Cambridge, Lee became a friend of the Austrian philosopher Ludwig Wittgenstein (1889–1951), in 1930 staying with the Wittgenstein family in Austria. Many years later, in editing Wittgenstein's Lectures: Cambridge, 1930–1932, Lee wrote an account of their friendship, which came to an end after the focus of Lee's academic career turned to ancient philosophy. His other friends during this period included William Empson.

== Career ==
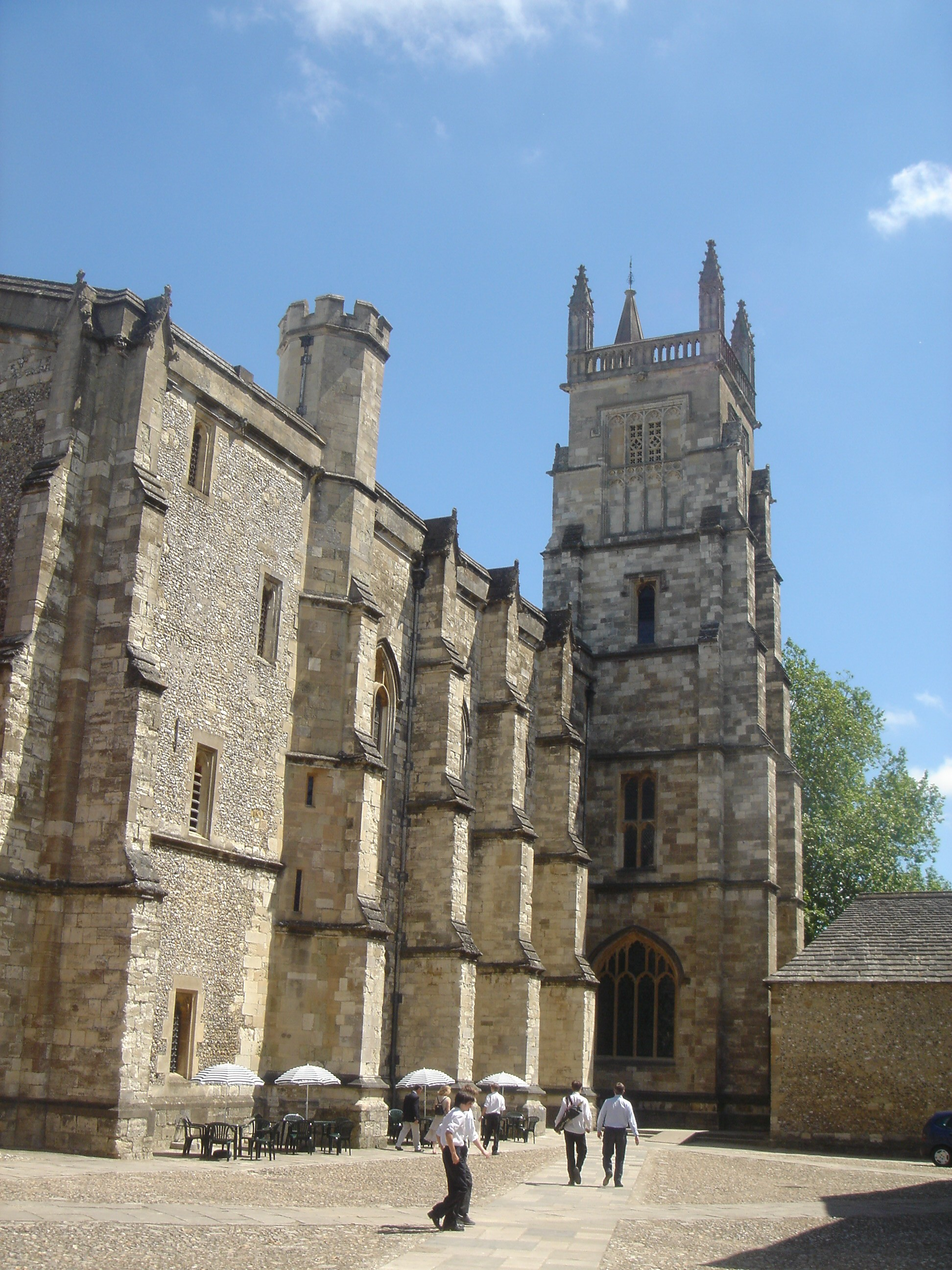
Chapel of Winchester College

Lee was elected a fellow of Corpus Christi College in 1933. The same year, he was admitted to the Middle Temple, but he did not go on to practice as a barrister. From 1935 to 1948 he was also a college tutor, from 1937 to 1948 a university lecturer in Classics, and in 1944 he became a member of the university's Council of the Senate, serving until 1948. From 1941 until 1944, during the Second World War, he also worked in the regional commissioner's office at Cambridge, assisting Will Spens.

In 1948, by which time he had become senior tutor of his college, Lee was persuaded to go to Clifton College as headmaster, and in 1954 proceeded from there to serve as head of Winchester College, where he remained until 1968. In 1958–59 he was a member of the Anderson Committee on Grants to Students and was twice chairman of the Headmasters' Conference, first in 1959–1960 and again in 1967.

In 1968 he returned to Cambridge as a fellow of University College (which was renamed Wolfson College in 1973). In 1973, he became president of Hughes Hall, serving until 1978, when he retired and was made an honorary fellow.

== Scholar ==
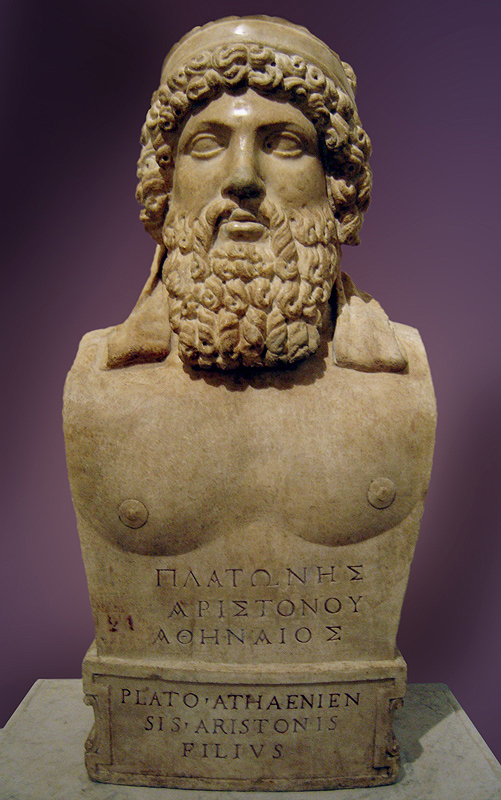
Marble bust of Plato

Lee published a study of the pre-Socratic Greek philosopher Zeno of Elea (1935), and translations with commentary of Aristotle's Meteorologica (1952), Plato's Republic (1955) and his dialogues Timæus and Critias (1971).

In his edition of the Republic of Plato, Lee defended Plato against criticism based on the term "noble lie", and translated γενναίον ψεύδος (gennaion pseudos) as "magnificent myth". He wrote:

Plato has been criticized for his Foundation Myth as if it were a calculated lie. That is partly because the phrase here translated 'magnificent myth' has been conventionally mistranslated 'noble lie'; and this has been used to support the charge that Plato countenances manipulation by propaganda. But the myth is accepted by all three classes, Guardians included. It is meant to replace the national traditions which any community has, which are intended to express the kind of community it is, or wishes to be, its ideals, rather than to state matters of fact."

In 1971 Desmond Lee added an Appendix on Atlantis to his translation of Plato's Timaeus-Critias: While conceding a possible historical background for Atlantis Lee at the same time called the Atlantis story "imaginary history" and "science fiction" in the past.

== Private life ==
In 1935, Lee married Elizabeth, daughter of Colonel A. Crookenden CBE DSO, and they had one son and two daughters.

An art collector, his paintings included an Ivon Hitchens landscape. In an obituary, a Clifton colleague wrote of him:

Those who served under him found him either intellectually stimulating or maddeningly remote. He was very tall. His body was oddly but imposingly shaped, its silhouette unmistakable. His voice was mellow but decisive, full of odd emphases which were sometimes soporific but always vital to the sense.

Lee died on 8 December 1993, after many years of retirement, with his mental powers failing. At the time of his death he was living at 8, Barton Close, Cambridge. He had become an active supporter of the parish church at Grantchester.

== Honours ==
- Knighthood, 1961
- Honorary D. Litt, University of Nottingham, 1963

== Publications ==
- Zeno of Elea: a text and notes, 1935
- Aristotle, Meteorologica, 1952
- Plato, Republic, 1955, revised edition 1974
- Plato, Timæus and Critias, with an appendix on Atlantis, 1971 (NB: The 2008 revised edition omits the Appendix on Atlantis)
- Entry and Performance at Oxford and Cambridge, 1966–71, 1972
- Wittgenstein's Lectures 1930–32 (ed.), 1980

== See also ==
- John Thorn, a pupil of Lee's who also became headmaster of Winchester College

Academic offices
Preceded by Bertrand Hallward	Headmaster of Clifton College; 1948–1954	Succeeded by N. G. L. Hammond
Preceded by Walter Oakeshott	Headmaster of Winchester College; 1954–1968	Succeeded by John Leonard Thorn
Preceded by Margaret Wileman	President of Hughes Hall, Cambridge; 1973–1978	Succeeded by Richard D'Aeth
