= Theo Hobson =

British theologian (born 1972)

- Born: 1972 (age 53–54)
- Education: University of York; Hughes Hall, Cambridge
- Occupation: Theologian
- Writing career
- Period: 2002–present
- Subject: Theology
- Website: www.theohobson.co.uk

Theo Hobson (born 1972) is a British theologian and author.

== Biography ==
He was educated at St Paul's School in London; he read English literature at the University of York, then theology at the University of Cambridge, where he was a member of Hughes Hall. He focused on the strongest voices of the Protestant tradition: Martin Luther, Søren Kierkegaard, and Karl Barth. His PhD thesis became the basis of his first book, The Rhetorical Word: Protestant Theology and the Rhetoric of Authority (2002), a study of the role of authoritative rhetoric in Protestantism.

He gradually turned his attention to ecclesiology. His next book was Against Establishment: An Anglican Polemic (2003). In this book he announced that the Church of England was doomed, and that he considered himself a "post-Anglican". His third book is Anarchy, Church and Utopia: Rowan Williams on the Church (2005), a critique of the archbishop's ecclesiology and perhaps of all ecclesiology. He has written for various journals and newspapers including The Guardian, The Times, The Spectator, and The Tablet.

His principal interests are the relationship between Protestantism and secularism, which he believes is more positive than is generally understood; the relationship between theology and literature; and the post-ecclesial renewal of worship. He thinks that large-scale carnival-style celebration must replace church worship. He lives in Harlesden, London, and is married with two children.

Hobson has argued that although there is an instinctive mistrust of spectacle in the Protestant church, Catholic-style theatricality is an essential part of religion.

In his 2013 book Reinventing Liberal Christianity it is proposed that it is possible to be a political and secular liberal that avoids the truth claims of Christianity while retaining the cultus.

== Published works ==
- The Rhetorical Word: Protestant Theology and the Rhetoric of Authority. Aldershot, England: Ashgate. 2002. ISBN 978-0-7546-0655-0.
- Against Establishment: An Anglican Polemic. London: Darton, Longman & Todd. 2003. ISBN 978-0-232-52508-3.
- Anarchy, Church and Utopia: Rowan Williams on the Church. London: Darton, Longman & Todd. 2005. ISBN 978-0-232-52578-6.
- Milton's Vision: The Birth of Christian Liberty. London: Continuum. 2008. ISBN 978-1-84706-342-7.
- Faith. Durham, England: Acumen Publishing. 2009. ISBN 978-1-84465-202-0.
- Reinventing Liberal Christianity. Grand Rapids, Michigan: Wm. B. Eerdmans Publishing Company. 2013. ISBN 978-0-8028-6840-4.
- God Created Humanism: The Christian Basis of Secular Values. London: SPCK Publishing. 2017. ISBN 978-0-281-07742-7.
- —; Inge, John, eds. (24 July 2025). Created for love: Towards a new teaching on sex and marriage. Norwich, UK: Canterbury Press. ISBN 978-1-78622-669-3.

== See also ==
- Rowan Williams
