= Kennedys Law =

International law firm

Kennedys Law LLP
- Headquarters: London, 20 Fenchurch Street, United Kingdom
- No. of offices: 46
- No. of employees: 2900+
- Major practice areas: Insurance and reinsurance, litigation, healthcare, maritime and international trade, employment, banking and finance, aviation, insolvency and corporate recovery, real estate, contracts
- Key people: Meg Catalano (Global managing partner); John Bruce (Senior partner); Matt Andrews (APAC regional managing partner); Eric Hiller (U.S. regional managing partner)
- Revenue: ▲£428 million (2024/25)
- Date founded: 1899 (London)
- Founder: Charles Kennedy
- Company type: Limited liability partnership
- Website: www.kennedyslaw.com

Kennedys Law LLP is an international law firm headquartered in London. The firm merged with American law firm Carroll McNulty & Kull (CMK) in 2017. A global corporate law firm, Kennedys specialises in litigation and dispute resolution.

In 2024/25, the firm's revenue was £428million (US $551 million) an increase of 13% from the previous financial year. The firm announced in November 2024 that Meg Catalano had been appointed global managing partner and Eric Hiller would be replacing her as U.S. managing partner.

On 18 December 2024 Kennedys announced that John Bruce would be the firm's next senior partner, replacing Nick Thomas who had been in that role for 27 years, after having previously led the firm's global financial lines practice, and is a member of its executive group.

== History ==
Kennedys was founded in London in 1899 by British solicitor Charles Kennedy, who had qualified as a lawyer Australia.

Founder Kennedy was part of several partnerships: Kennedy, Danvers & Co; C. Frederick Kennedy & Co; Kennedy Lindo & Co; and Kennedy Genese & Co.

The firm began expanding internationally in 2000, opening offices in Auckland and Hong Kong, then, later in Singapore. It merged with Danish law firm Advokatfirmaet Erritzøe in 2016, and formed associations with law firms Kogstad Lunde & Co in Norway, and Advokatfirman NorelidHolm in Sweden.

In 2026, the firm formed a strategic partnership with Spellbook generative legal AI platform.

=== Expansion ===
- 1996: Opened Belfast office
- 2008: Merged with Davies Lavery, acquiring offices in Birmingham and Maidstone
- 2010: Established the Miami office
- 2013: Merged with aviation specialist firm Gates and Partners, adding 70 employees and a Brussels office
- 2015: Formed a joint law venture with Legal Solutions LLC in Singapore,
- 2016: Merged with marine and shipping law firm Waltons & Morse
- 2017: Merged with U.S. insurance law firm Carroll McNulty & Kull (CMK)
- 2017: Merged with commercial disputes firm berg
- 2018: Formed an association with Israeli insurance law firm Zelichov, Ben-Dan & Co, opening of an office in Israel.
- 2023: Moved their flagship London office to 20 Fenchurch Street (the "Walkie-Talkie")

Between 2017-2023, Kennedys opened offices in Mexico City, Melbourne, Bangkok, Buenos Aires, Paris, Bermuda, Bristol, San Francisco, Israel, Oman, Perth, Leeds, Wilmington, Brisbane, Houston, Newcastle and Fort Lauderdale.

In 2019, Suzanne Liversidge was appointed as Kennedys' first global managing partner.

From 2020 to 2023, Kennedys formed associations with:

- Dolden Wallace Folick LLP in Canada
- Baysal & Demir in Turkey
- Lopez del Solar in Bolivia
- Tobar ZVS in Ecuador
- PALM Legal in Portugal
- Next Advokater in Sweden
- AZ Cardoso Advogados (AZC) in Brazil

In December 2024 the firm was recognised by Law360 as having achieved 13th place, out of 50 firms in total, for their global network and ranking 16th for their global bench strength. The firm's global footprint went from strength to strength in 2024, with the addition of three new offices in the United States, Fort Lauderdale, Seattle and Los Angeles, as well as expansion in New Zealand.

== Awards ==
2025

- Claims Team of the Year - Service Provider at the Claims Excellence Awards 2025
- Cyber Law Firm of the Year at the Intelligent Insurer Cyber Insurance Europe Awards

2024

- Claims Team of the Year at the British Claims Awards 2024
- Best Law Firm for Partner Approachability by Legal Cheek
- Cyber Law Firm of the Year at Cyber Insurance Europe Awards and Intelligent Insurer Cyber Insurance Europe Awards 2024

2023

- Technology Partner of the Year - Claims (Insurance Times Tech and Innovation Awards)
- Impact Case of the Year (LMG Life Sciences Awards EMEA) for Hastings v Finsbury Orthopaedics Ltd and Stryker LTD 2022 case
- Cyber Risk Lawyer of the Year (Zywave Cyber Risk Awards Gala) for Judy Selby
- Technology Partner of the Year Bronze winner (Insurance Times Tech and Innovation Awards)
