= Shane O'Mara (rower) =

American rower

Shane Francis O'Mara (born December 18, 1982, in Buffalo, New York) is a five time national team American rower.

As a junior rower he set multiple records including the youngest winner of the Head of the Charles single sculls race. He also represented the United States at the 2000 (as a junior) in Zagreb, Croatia.

O'Mara continued to row as senior athlete and represented the United States in sculling events several times: 2005 World Rowing Championships in Gifu, Japan; and 2006 World Rowing Championships in Dorney, England. He also sculled in two World Cup events in 2007.

He was educated at The Gunnery (a prep school), Northeastern University and University of Cambridge in England. As a member of Cambridge University Boat Club, he was selected to stroke the 2008 Blue Boat.
