= Sister Gregory Kirkus =

English Roman Catholic nun, academic

Gregory Kirkus, IBVM (9 November 1910 – 30 August 2007) was an English Catholic nun, educator, historian and archivist. She was a member of the Sisters of Loreto.

Born as Phyllis Kirkus in York, Gregory was a historian of English convent life whose own biographical work has provided research tools for historians of the English recusant period. Gregory presided over a collection of antique books, artefacts and manuscripts at the Bar Convent in York, the oldest convent in England, and a girls' school from 1686 to 1985.

== Early years ==
She gained a place at Newnham College, Cambridge in 1929, eight years after the university voted against conferring its degrees on women.

She was received into the Catholic Church in the chapel of the Canonesses of Saint Augustine next to Newnham, since Fisher House, the Catholic chaplaincy under Monsignor Alfred Gilbey, was also closed to women. Training in librarianship, her application for a post at Southampton University was thwarted by a pilfering office boy who destroyed her letter. She later ascribed this disaster to divine providence, as it led to a job in the University of Hull, where she explored her growing sense of a vocation to religious life. A random meeting with Sister Philip Hardman, a scholar and historian, led her to the Bar Convent and the discovery of the Institute of the Blessed Virgin Mary (IBVM), an unenclosed order of women founded by Mary Ward (1585–1645) in 1609. Phyllis' Anglican family was not accepting of either her conversion or her decision to enter religious life, yet she did so anyway. Entering the novitiate, she took the religious name Sister Gregory.

The outbreak of World War II necessitated the temporary evacuation of St. Mary's Convent, Hampstead, where she was teaching, to the East Sussex mansion of Lady Catherine Ashburnham. After a second evacuation, the school found a permanent new home at Coombe House, Shaftesbury, in 1945. As headmistress of St. Mary's School, Shaftesbury, Sister Gregory determined to run an exemplary school for women of the future.

In 1972, she was appointed as Provincial Superior of the Institute of the Blessed Virgin Mary, later known as the Congregation of Jesus. This was during the turmoil of the Second Vatican Council (1962–1965). Sister Gregory did not welcome the changes proposed by the council, given her conservatism. With the help of educator (and Catholic convert), Margaret Wileman, Sister Gregory administered educational programmes for her own province and two international summer schools where sisters from around the world, responsible for running schools around the world. Her influence as an educator encouraged improvements which enabled the Bar Convent Grammar School, and St Mary's Schools in Hampstead, Ascot, Shaftesbury and Cambridge, to successfully evolve to schools administered by laypersons.

== Later years ==
Around 1981 set up the Bar Convent Museum, archives and library. She wrote numerous sketches of school and convent life in the seventeenth and eighteenth centuries for the Catholic Record Society. A lifelong teetotaller who lived in considerable personal austerity, it was only when she appeared on a Channel Four documentary on the Bar Convent that her astonished sisters discovered her to be an avid buyer of lottery tickets, in the hope of winning the fortune that would secure the convent's future.

== Death ==
She died, aged 96, on the feast-day of Saint Margaret Clitherow, like Ward and Kirkus, a Yorkshirewoman, whose relics are kept in the Bar Convent chapel.

== Selected works ==
- Life in the Bar Convent: 1686-1900, (2008), Yorkshire Architectural and York Archaeological Society, ISBN 978-09-5473944-7
- Mary Ward, (2007), Éditions du Signe, ISBN 978-27-4682072-2
- A recusant library; the Bar Convent, York, (ca 2000), self, OCLC 913024748
- The history of the Bar Convent, (2001), Bar Convent Trust, OCLC 931095554

== Sources ==
- Sister Kirkus' obituary in The Times Online; accessed 6 August 2014.
- BBC report of death of Sister Gregory Kirkus; accessed 6 August 2014.
