= Shawne Merriman =

American football player (born 1984)

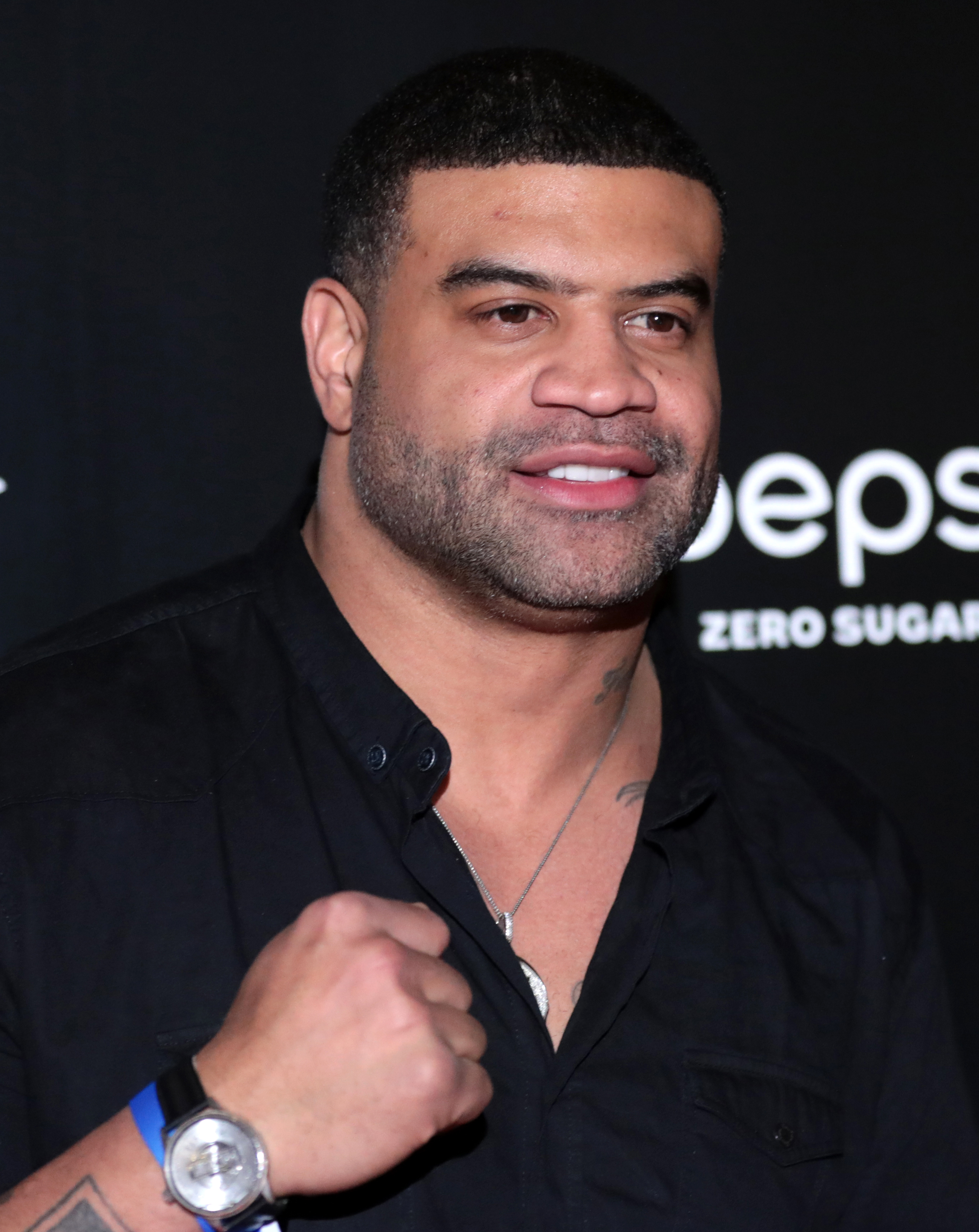
- Merriman in 2023

No. 56
- Position: Linebacker

Personal information
- Born: May 25, 1984 (age 42); Washington, D.C., U.S.
- Listed height: 6 ft 4 in (1.93 m)
- Listed weight: 261 lb (118 kg)

Career information
- High school: Douglass (Upper Marlboro, Maryland)
- College: Maryland (2002–2004)
- NFL draft: 2005: 1st round, 12th overall pick

Career history
- San Diego Chargers (2005–2010); Buffalo Bills (2010–2012)

Awards and highlights
- NFL Defensive Rookie of the Year (2005); First-team All-Pro (2006); Second-team All-Pro (2007); 3× Pro Bowl (2005–2007); NFL sacks leader (2006); PFWA All-Rookie Team (2005); San Diego Chargers 50th Anniversary Team; First-team All-ACC (2004)

Career NFL statistics
- Total tackles: 258
- Sacks: 45.5
- Forced fumbles: 8
- Fumble recoveries: 4
- Pass deflections: 20
- Interceptions: 1
- Stats at Pro Football Reference

Shawne DeAndre Merriman (born May 25, 1984), nicknamed "Lights Out", is an American former professional football player who was a linebacker in the National Football League (NFL). He played college football for the Maryland Terrapins and was selected 12th overall by the San Diego Chargers in the 2005 NFL draft. He earned NFL Defensive Rookie of the Year honors in his first season and recorded 39 1/2 quarterback sacks in his first three seasons, also making three Pro Bowls as well as two All-Pro selections. He was hampered by injuries his next three seasons, and the Chargers waived Merriman midseason in 2010. He was picked up through waivers by the Buffalo Bills that season, but he only played minimally with the Bills due to continued injuries. He was released by the Bills before the 2012 season however, they re-signed him midseason. He retired at the end of the 2012 season.

== Early life ==
Merriman grew up in Upper Marlboro, Maryland. He earned his nickname "Lights Out" at Frederick Douglass High School, where he rendered four opposing players unconscious in one game, three in the first half and one in the second half.

Merriman started three years on both the varsity football and basketball teams. On the hardwood, Merriman was named one of the top five basketball defenders in the D.C. area by The Washington Post. For his football performance during his senior year, he was selected to the first team all-state and named Maryland Defensive Player of the Year by the Associated Press. He also played some tight end in high school.

== College career ==
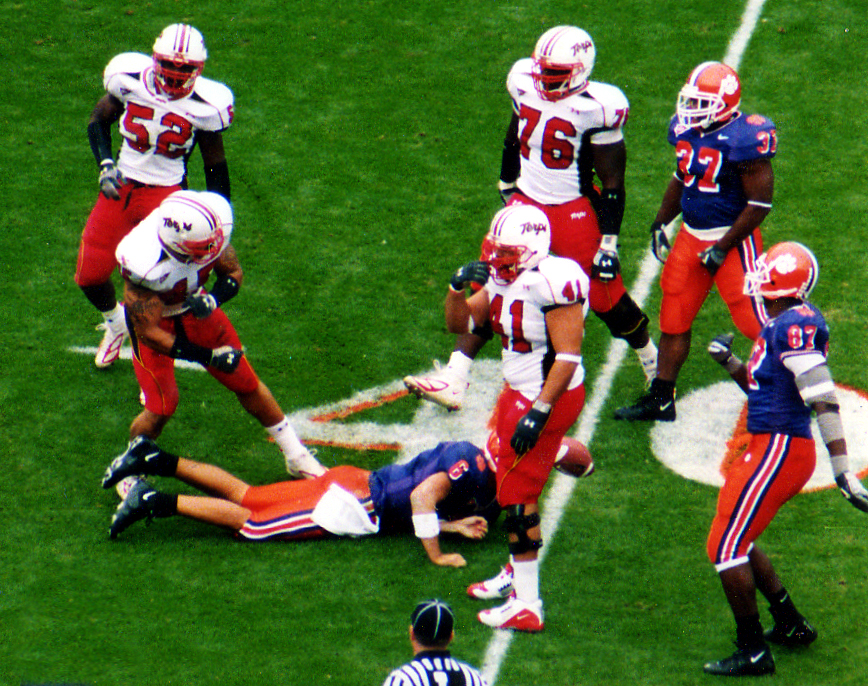
Merriman celebrates a sack of Clemson QB Charlie Whitehurst during a 2004 game.

Despite being heavily recruited, Merriman stayed in-state for college and attended the University of Maryland, where he played for the Maryland Terrapins football team. During his freshman campaign in 2002, Merriman appeared in 13 games and finished third on the team with 5 sacks.

He battled injuries for the bulk of his sophomore season, but never missed a game. He broke onto the national scene his junior year, in which he was named to the ACC All-Conference team and earned the Iron Terp award for the "strongest pound for pound player" on the Maryland football roster.

His 41.5" vertical jump in 2003 was the best ever by a Maryland defensive lineman to that point.

=== The MerriMan Project ===
Beginning in Merriman's sophomore year, he instituted an ongoing MerriMan Project, in which Maryland football players draw names out of a helmet for a Secret Santa-style gift exhcange; gifts are exchanged at the team banquet on December 23 each year. Tradition dictates that, should Maryland ever qualify for a post-Christmas Bowl game, and therefore postpone its pre-Christmas banquet, the MerriMan Project will cease; when Mike Locksley accepted the team's head coaching position in 2018, he announced at his first press conference, "I'll tell you right now, we've celebrated our last MerriMan Christmas in College Park!"

== Professional career ==
Pre-draft measurables
Height	Weight	Arm length	Hand span	40-yard dash	10-yard split	20-yard split	20-yard shuttle	Vertical jump	Broad jump	Bench press
6 ft 4 3/8 in (1.94 m)	272 lb (123 kg)	33 5/8 in (0.85 m)	9 1/2 in (0.24 m)	4.64 s	1.59 s	2.67 s	4.21 s	40 in (1.02 m)	10 ft 1 in (3.07 m)	25 reps
All values from NFL Combine/Pro Day

=== San Diego Chargers ===
Merriman was selected in the first round (12th overall) in the 2005 NFL Draft out of the University of Maryland by the San Diego Chargers. He was selected using a pick acquired from the New York Giants as part of the Rivers-Manning trade during the 2004 NFL draft.

The Giants traded Philip Rivers (selected 4th overall in the 2004 Draft), and their 1st round selection for the following year (amongst others) for the rights to sign Eli Manning, who had been selected by the San Diego Chargers with the 1st overall pick that year. Manning had made it clear he was not interested in playing for the Chargers, in a similar fashion to John Elway in 1983 when selected by the Baltimore Colts.

The Giants draft pick ended up being the 12th overall pick in the 2005 NFL Draft. The Chargers used that selection to take Merriman.

On August 1, after a long holdout period, Merriman signed a 5-year, $11.5 million contract that included $9 million in guarantees and $4 million in incentives.

==== 2005 season ====
Merriman started off his 2005 rookie year on the inactive list and completed a 10-day hold out from training camp. He did not break the starting lineup until week 7, but recorded 6 sacks in his first 4 starts. He was voted into the Pro Bowl as an OLB after playing the position for the San Diego Chargers in their 3–4 defensive scheme which is the same position he played at the University of Maryland. Merriman's best game of the year came in week 15 when the Chargers handed the Indianapolis Colts their first loss of the season. Merriman recorded 2 sacks and 2 tackles for a loss, one of which stopped Peyton Manning for a 6-yard loss on 4th and goal. It was during this game that Shawne Merriman garnered much national media coverage and in the following week made the Pro Bowl.

The Chargers would go 9–7 in 2005, taking down both the defending Super Bowl champion New England Patriots and the 14–0 Indianapolis Colts.

On January 4, 2006, Merriman was awarded with The Associated Press Defensive Rookie of the Year award. He received 28 1/2 votes of a panel of 50 NFL sportswriters and broadcasters. He beat Seattle Seahawks linebacker Lofa Tatupu, who received 16 1/2 votes, Cincinnati linebacker Odell Thurman, with 4, and Dallas linebacker DeMarcus Ware, with one. On February 12, 2006, Merriman participated in the 2006 NFL Pro Bowl in Honolulu, Hawaii. Although in a losing effort, Merriman made 3 tackles and forced one fumble. "I enjoyed myself the whole entire week", said Merriman. "I topped it off today by playing the entire game with all the guys I grew up watching. It's going to be my first of many if I just keep working hard."

==== 2006 season ====
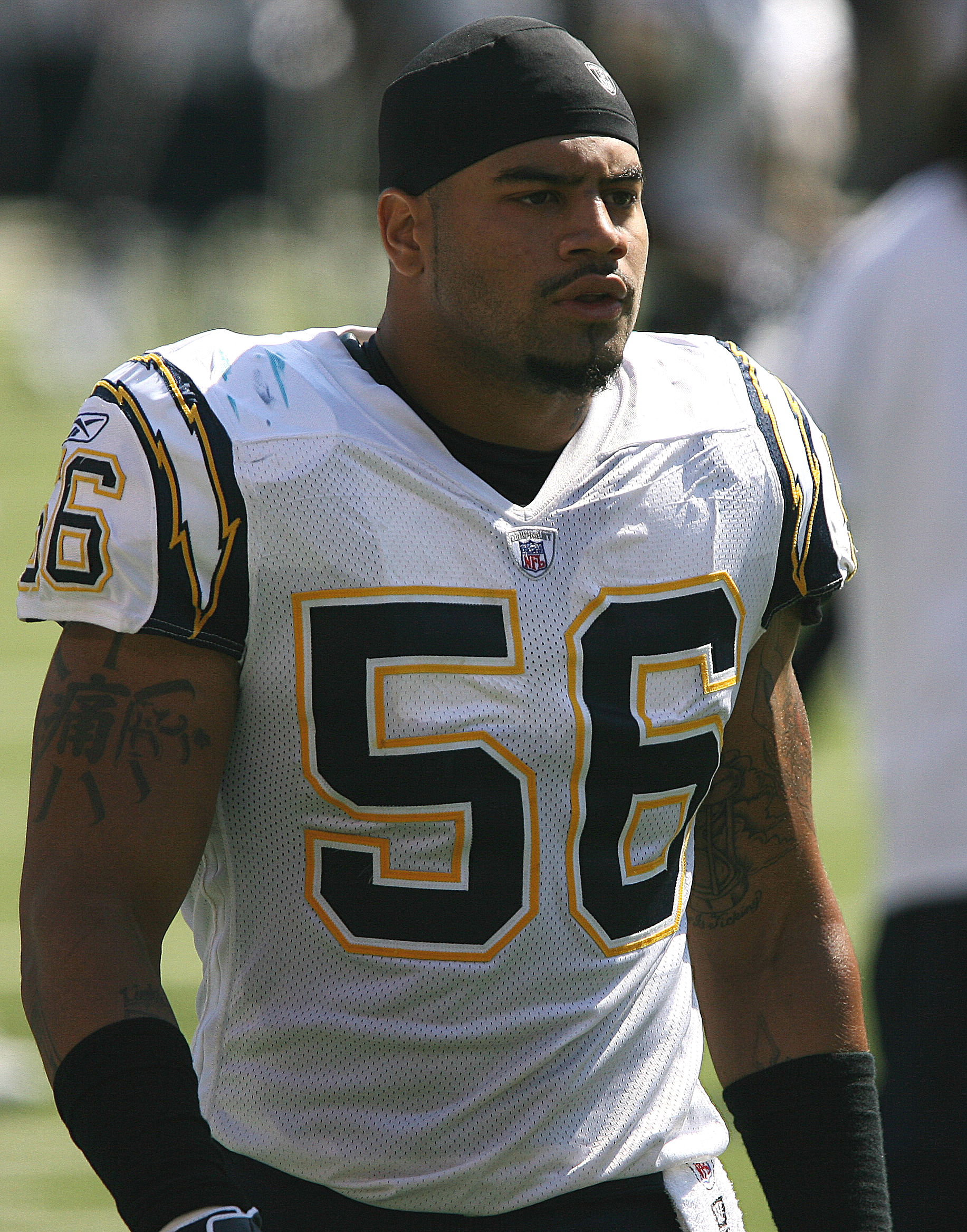
Merriman during the 2006 season.

On October 22, 2006, reports were made public by CNN that Merriman would face a 4-game suspension for violating the NFL's steroid policy. ESPN's Chris Mortensen cited a source that claimed the suspension was "definitely for steroid use and not a 'supplement-type' suspension." Mortenson's report later came under scrutiny from Merriman's attorney, David Cornwell, who called the report "irresponsible and erroneous." Under NFL league policy, no player's suspension proceedings are to be announced before the suspension takes place. Subsequently, Cornwell stated that he believed the substance his client tested positive for was the anabolic steroid nandrolone, and that Merriman claimed it must have been in a tainted nutritional supplement he took regularly. Merriman never identified the supplement.

The incident led to the passage of a rule that forbids a player who tests positive for steroids from being selected to the Pro Bowl or winning any performance awards in the year in which they tested positive. The rule is commonly referred as the "Merriman Rule". However, NFL Commissioner Roger Goodell has tried to distance the policy from being associated with the player, stating that Merriman tested clean on 19 of 20 random tests for performance-enhancing drugs since entering the league.

At the start of his 2006 season after the 4-game suspension, Merriman again began his season with success, recording 3 sacks and an interception in his first 2 games. Merriman went on to record 8.5 sacks and make ESPN's midseason All-pro team, prior to dropping an appeal against an NFL enforced 4-week suspension due to testing positive for steroids. In the 2006 regular season, Merriman led the league in sacks with 17.5 while playing only 12 games. He also added 4 forced fumbles to his career (2 against both the Buffalo Bills and the Denver Broncos). Merriman finished third in the balloting for 2006 Associated Press Defensive Player of the Year, behind Jason Taylor and Champ Bailey, after having tested positive for using steroids which is against the league's drug abuse policy. Taylor commented that Merriman should not have been considered for the award because of his suspension. Merriman reportedly responded by sending Taylor a "Lights Out" t-shirt and a box of popcorn with a note saying enjoy watching him in the playoffs. Merriman, nicknamed "Lights Out", performed a dance to celebrate each of his 17.5 sacks in 2006–2009. After the Chargers were eliminated in the playoffs by the New England Patriots that season, members of the Patriots began performing Merriman's "Lights Out" dance on the field in celebration. Merriman's Chargers teammate LaDainian Tomlinson, referred to the act as showing no class and being disrespectful.

==== 2007 season ====
In 2007, he announced that he would no longer perform this celebration. In week 4, however, Merriman performed the dance after sacking Kansas City Chiefs quarterback Damon Huard. After the Chargers' slow 1–3 start to the season, Merriman exclaimed that he decided to do the sack dance again due to the urge of his teammates and to help revive the spirits of the Charger fans.

Merriman finished the season with 68 total tackles, with 54 solo and 14 assisted tackles, performing to his usual caliber by tallying 12.5 sacks. His prowess was shown during the season when it was said that his 9.5 sacks through to week 13 was seen as a decline in performance, a quote to which Merriman took a great compliment. The Chargers finished the season with a loss to the New England Patriots in the AFC Championship game.

Merriman was named to the Pro Bowl for a third consecutive year. At that point had a total of 39.5 sacks in three seasons. His 39.5 sacks are the most for any player from 2005 to 2007, edging out Jason Taylor by just one full sack. He had also been named First-Team All-Pro in his first 2 seasons, while earning a Second-Team All-Pro selection in his 3rd season.

==== 2008 season ====
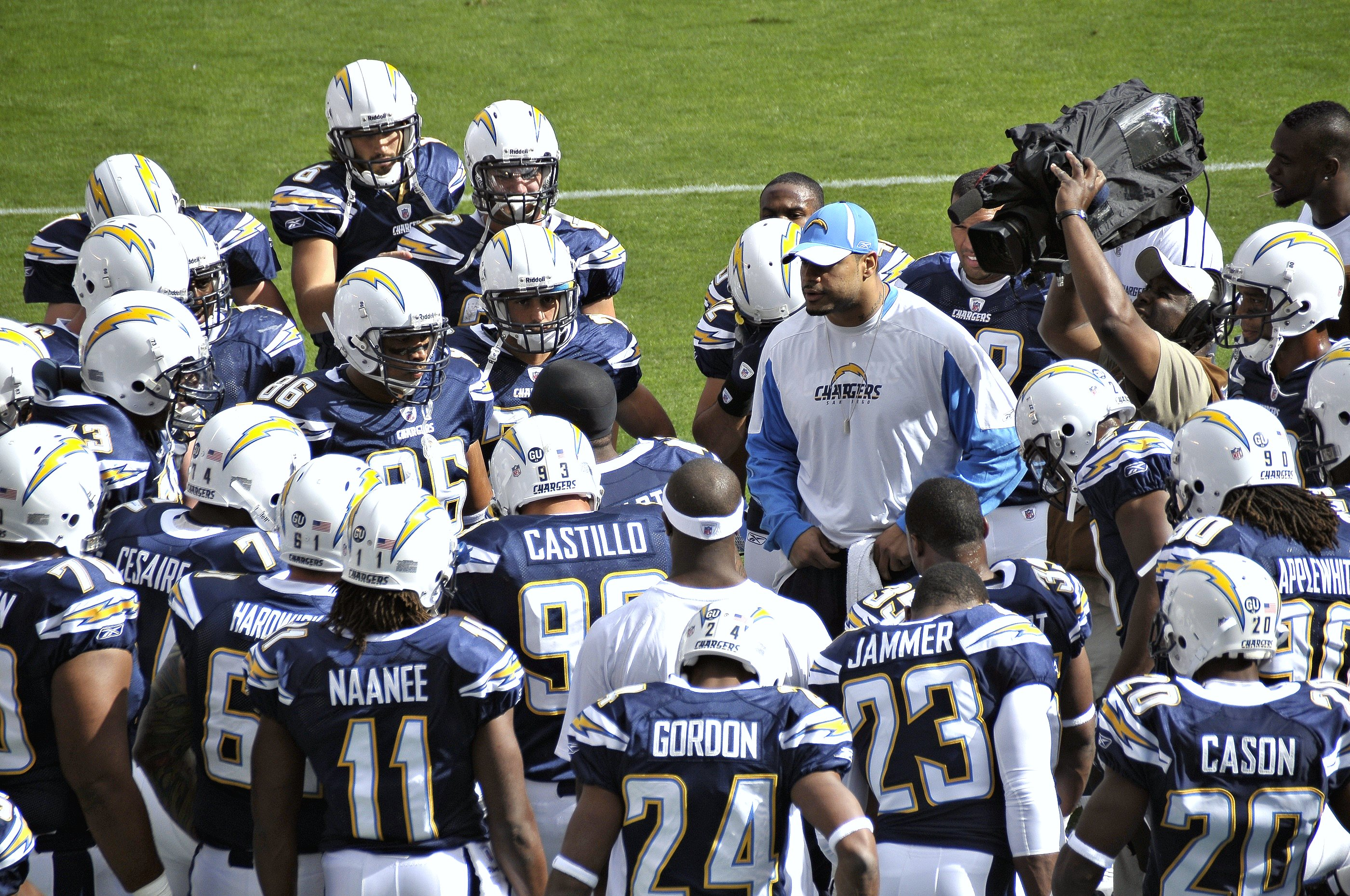
Merriman sat out most of the 2008 NFL season due to injury.

During the 2008 training camp, Merriman had difficulty with his injured knee and sat out of practice for over two weeks. Initial reports were that his recovery would take a few weeks, but on August 23, Merriman reported that he had a tear in both his posterior cruciate ligament and lateral collateral ligament. He was told by doctors that he could sustain a possible career-threatening injury should he choose to play without having surgery. Merriman withheld his decision whether or not to play while seeking several different professional opinions, including that of well-known surgeon James Andrews of Birmingham, Alabama. ESPN's Mike Tirico reported in the Chargers' Monday Night Football game that Merriman went to Miami, Florida to get a final opinion on his knee. On August 27, Merriman told Fox Sports that he would go against the advice of the doctors and will try to play through the injury, stating that he simply wants to play and that the career-ending possibilities were "misquoted."

On September 9, it was announced that Merriman would indeed go through with the reconstructive knee surgery to repair his torn knee ligaments and would be placed on the Injured Reserve, missing the rest of the 2008 NFL Season.

==== 2009 season ====
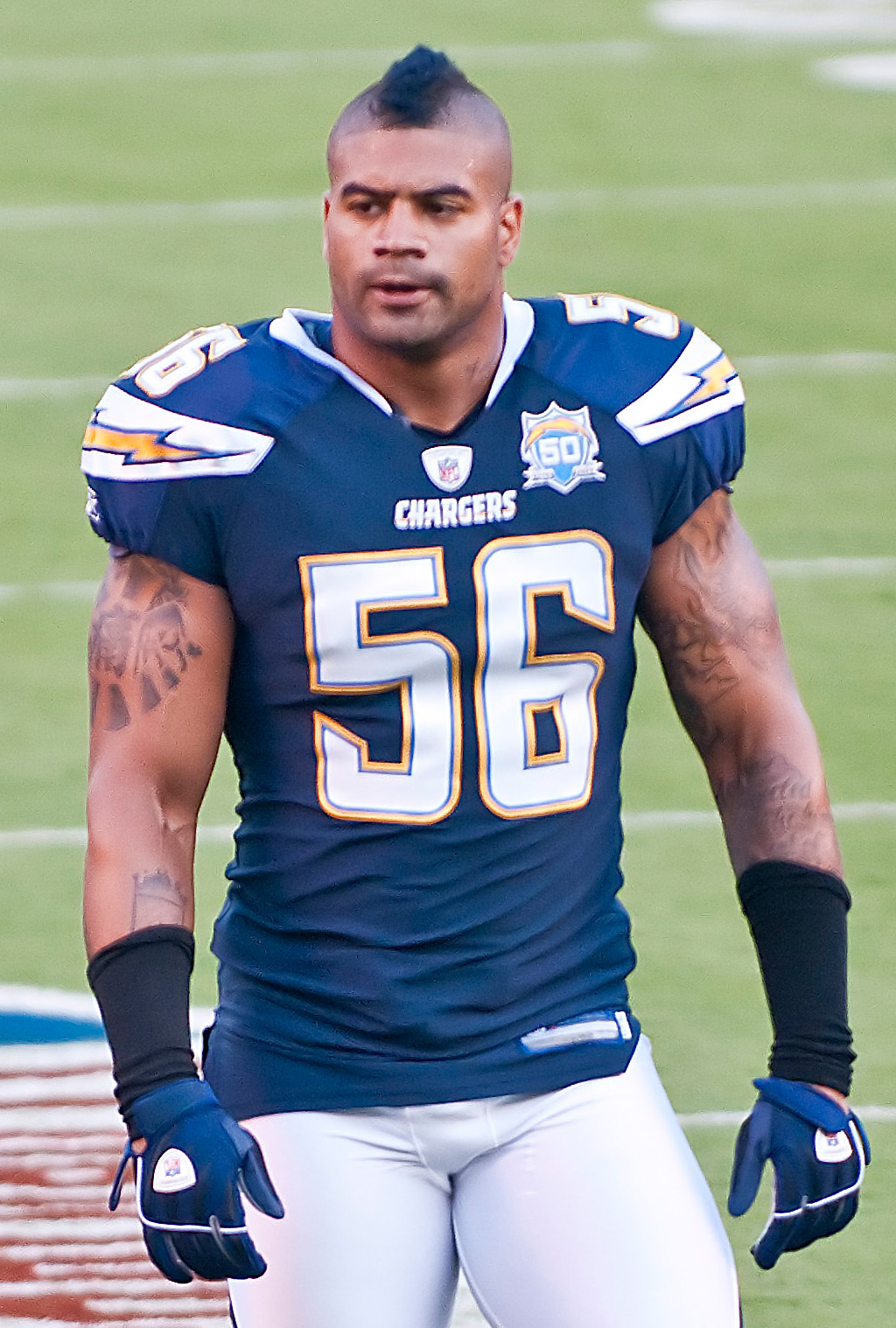
Merriman with the San Diego Chargers in 2009

In the 2009 season, Merriman was suffering from a painful foot injury as well as his troubled knees. He had only four sacks for the season.

==== 2010 season ====
At the beginning of the calendar year, Merriman expressed concern that the Chargers may no longer want him, but said that his goal was to remain a Charger if possible. On March 4, 2010, the San Diego Chargers announced that they would place their first and third round franchise tender on Merriman, thus retaining him as a Charger. On August 13, 2010, after two weeks of hold out, Shawne Merriman signed tender and reported to camp.

On October 13, the Chargers announced that Merriman was being placed on injured reserve and, per NFL rules, would be released when he became healthy. Merriman had re-injured his calf against Oakland and had been limited in the first five weeks of the season. Merriman was put on waivers by the Chargers on November 2, 2010. He had only four sacks in his last three seasons in San Diego.

=== Buffalo Bills ===
Merriman was claimed off waivers by the Buffalo Bills the day after his release from the Chargers.

On November 10, Merriman suffered an Achilles injury during his first workout with his new team. Subsequently, on November 27, the Bills placed Merriman on season-ending injury reserve.

He signed a two-year contract extension worth $10.5 million with the Bills on January 1, 2011. The deal contained $5 million guaranteed, including $3 million of his 2012 salary.

On October 25, 2011, Merriman was placed on Injured Reserve list for the second consecutive season after suffering a partially torn Achilles tendon. Merriman finished the season with nine tackles and a sack in five starts. During the 2012 offseason, Merriman was moved from outside linebacker to defensive end due to the switch of 3–4 to 4–3. On August 20, the team released Merriman.

Merriman signed a contract to return to the Bills on October 15, 2012.

=== Retirement ===
On March 5, 2013, Merriman announced his retirement.

== NFL career statistics ==
Year	Team	GP	Comb	Solo	Ast	Sack	FF	FR	Yds	Int	Yds	Avg	Lng	TD	PD
2005	SD	15	57	43	14	10.0	2	0	0	0	0	0.0	0	0	4
2006	SD	12	63	49	14	17.5	4	1	0	1	10	10.0	10	0	8
2007	SD	15	68	54	14	12.5	2	2	0	0	0	0.0	0	0	4
2008	SD	1	2	1	1	0.0	0	0	0	0	0	0.0	0	0	0
2009	SD	14	36	26	10	4.0	0	1	0	0	0	0.0	0	0	0
2010	SD	3	6	5	1	0.0	0	0	0	0	0	0.0	0	0	0
2011	BUF	5	9	7	2	1.0	0	0	0	0	0	0.0	0	0	0
2012	BUF	10	17	12	5	1.0	0	0	0	0	0	0.0	0	0	1
Career		75	258	197	61	46	8	4	0	1	10	10.0	10	0	17

== Legal issues ==
On September 6, 2009, Merriman was arrested and charged with battery and false imprisonment. Merriman's former girlfriend, reality TV star Tila Tequila, claimed in an arrest complaint that he choked and restrained her when she tried to leave his home. The charges were dismissed less than a week later on September 11, 2009.

In December 2009, Merriman filed a civil suit against Tequila, alleging intentional interference with contract, unfair competition, and trademark infringement. He claimed that Tequila improperly used his own "Lights Out" logo and disrupted negotiations for T-shirts to be marketed by Wal-Mart. She failed to respond to the suit at all, and a default judgment was entered in his favor for $2 million. However, the default judgment was later set aside in January 2010. In February 2010, both sides jointly moved the court to dismiss the claim, and the court dismissed the case on the same day.

On July 21, 2017, Kimberly Fattorini was found dead from an apparent overdose. Fattorini's parents, Deann and Ferdinand, filed the wrongful death lawsuit against Merriman, a nightclub, and others, alleging the girl was drugged and possibly assaulted before her death. A Los Angeles County judge entered a $4 million judgment against Merriman and three others. Merriman was present when Fattorini passed out and a friend of hers called 911. In the suit, Fattorini's parents claim their daughter sent texts earlier that night saying Merriman poured something in her drink. They now believe that something was GHB—a powerful depressant commonly referred to as "the date rape drug." When paramedics arrived midday July 21, 2017, they found Fattorini unresponsive on the floor, half-naked, "with her jeans unzipped and unbuttoned, as though someone had tried to pull her jeans on to her body before the police or paramedics arrived." Her bra was twisted. She was not wearing underwear, though she had been earlier that night. The coroner did not perform a sexual assault exam; by the time an LASD detective requested one, "in light of additional information he had received," it was no longer possible.

== Media appearances ==
Merriman was featured on an episode of MTV Exposed. On October 10, 2007, Merriman was chosen as the cover athlete for EA Sports' NFL Tour video game. Merriman appears in Keri Hilson's "Knock You Down" music video and made a special appearance at WWE's One Night Stand 2008 on June 1, 2008, where he hit superstar Chavo Guerrero with a Singapore Cane. He returned to WWE as a WrestleMania XXX pre-show analyst on April 6, 2014, and again the following night on Monday Night RAW's pre- and post-show on the WWE Network.

Merriman is featured in the Nike football "Leave Nothing" advertisement. Merriman made a cameo in season 7 of HBO's Entourage. Merriman also appeared on Cartoon Network's Destroy Build Destroy along with Antonio Gates. Merriman appeared on GNC's Athlete Tour 2010 under his MusclePharm sponsorship. Merriman appeared on WGR Sports Radio 550's "Schopp and the Bulldog" in Buffalo, New York on July 27, 2012. He visited the show's studio at Bills' training camp in Rochester, New York.

He showed off his tattoos in PETA's "Ink Not Mink" campaign, encouraging people not to wear animal furs.

In 2017, he appeared on MTV's The Challenge: Champs vs. Pros, playing for his charity, the Lights On Foundation.

In 2018, he appeared as a guest on the popular sports and comedy podcast The Dirty Sports Podcast hosted by comedians Andy Ruther and Joe Praino. He also appeared on FS1 as an NFL analyst.

Merriman made a few appearances for Total Nonstop Action Wrestling (TNA): On April 20, 2024 at Rebellion, he initially showed support for Joe Hendry during his match against Rich Swann, but turned on the former by giving him a clothesline and allowed Swann to win the match. On April 17, 2025 at Unbreakable, Merriman did commentary during TNA X Division Champion Moose's open challenge.

== Other ventures ==
In April 2014, Merriman appeared on the pre-show of WrestleMania XXX. Shortly after, it was reported on The JBL & Cole Show that Merriman had "joined the WWE family" and would report to the WWE Performance Center in Orlando, Florida. On August 27, reports surfaced indicating Merriman was no longer contracted to WWE.

In January 2015, Japanese martial arts event GANRYUJIMA announced that they were negotiating with Merriman for him to be a fighter, but they were unable to reach an agreement.

In 2017, Merriman partnered with NASCAR K&N Pro Series West driver and Naval officer Jesse Iwuji, serving as the owner of Iwuji's No. 36 car. The two met during a fashion show in Los Angeles promoting Merriman's new clothing line, "Lights Out"; Merriman, a longtime motorsports fan, agreed to join Iwuji's Patriot Motorsports Group team.

In August 2018, Merriman signed with the World Bare Knuckle Fighting Federation to appear in a fight later that year. Merriman was expected to face Mike Bourke in the inaugural WBKFF event on November 9, 2018. According to the promotion's president Bas Rutten, Wyoming athletic commission had suspicions that Bourke's previous fight in Romania was fixed and – him being from the same management team as Merriman – the commission would not license him to fight. In addition, Merriman and WBKFF had contract pay dispute and after the promotion allegedly agreed to pay the contracted sum, Merriman's management team would not agree. The promotion eventually refused to pay Merriman for not fighting, as his management demanded, leading Merriman to withdraw from the bout.

In April 2019, Merriman announced that he is starting his own MMA promotion, Lights Out Xtreme Fighting, which is expected to have its inaugural event on May 11, 2019.
