= Yasni =

yasni GmbH
- Company type: Private (GmbH)
- Website type: search engine
- Available in: English (and 14 others)
- Founded: Frankfurt/Main, Germany (2007)
- Headquarters: Frankfurt/Main and Leipzig, Germany
- Key people: Steffen Rühl, CEO and co-founder
- Employees: <30 (September 2012)
- Website: yasni.com
- Registration: Free (Required only for social network tools)
- Launched: 2007
- Current status: Active

Yasni is a German people search engine, operated by yasni GmbH. It aggregates search results from external sources and is therefore a meta search engine.

== Origin and development ==
Yasni was founded in 2007 by Steffen Rühl. In 2008, the Swiss Mountain Business Angels came on board as investor group, whereupon Yasni expanded and went online with an international version in 19 regions and 14 languages (September 2012).

== Functions ==
Besides the simple search there is also the possibility to regularly receive newly found search results by email or to actively place a missing person ad. With the so-called PeopleSearch Yasni developed a tool in 2009 to find people which match with certain keywords. Yasni enables its users to register a user account ("Exposé") and add the already found search results to it. With extended features such as adding own links, texts, or images or the creation of a business card Yasni allows people to differentiate themselves from namesakes and pursue active reputation management. With all that Yasni also allows its users the popular communication and interlinking possibilities of a social network.

Since 2009 Yasni has offered Premium accounts, with which the user can choose further functions - dependent on the selected premium product - within the fields “online presentation” or "search" that are liable to costs.

== Usability ==
According to the AGOF study yasni.de comes in 29th among German Internet offers.

== Criticism ==
The criticism of Yasni mostly refers to the field of search engines, which is, concerning privacy issues, rated as questionably, because (although publicly available) search results are displayed in a dossier-like overview. Additionally, critics accuse Yasni of not considering fundamental decisions regarding internet privacy.

There is further criticism regarding search engine optimization, which may cause Yasni search results to push down more relevant search results in search engines such as Google.
