= Elias Zerhouni =

Algerian-American radiologist (born 1951)

- الياس زرهوني
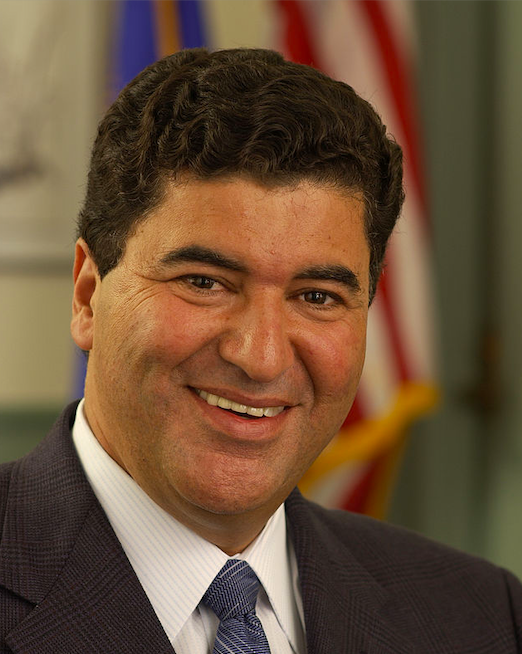
- Portrait of Zerhouni

15th Director of the National Institutes of Health
- In office May 2, 2002 – October 31, 2008
- President: George W. Bush
- Preceded by: Harold Varmus
- Succeeded by: Francis Collins

Personal details
- Born: April 12, 1951 (age 75) Nedroma, Algeria
- Citizenship: Algeria; United States
- Scientific career
- Education: University of Algiers (MD)
- Known for: Former Director of the National Institutes of Health; Former Physician-Scientist, Radiology Chair, and Executive Vice Dean at Johns Hopkins School of Medicine; Former President of Global R&D at Sanofi; Current President of OPKO Health and Co-founder of ModeX Therapeutics
- Awards: see "Awards and International Recognition" below
- Fields: Medical imaging
- Workplaces: Johns Hopkins School of Medicine

Elias Zerhouni (Arabic: إلياس زرهوني; born April 12, 1951) is an Algerian American radiologist and biomedical engineer who has held leadership roles in academia, government, and the pharmaceutical industry.

Zerhouni was a faculty member at Johns Hopkins University School of Medicine and served as the executive vice-dean from 1996 to 2002. He also served as the 15th director of the National Institutes of Health (NIH) from May 2, 2002, to October 31, 2008, under the George W. Bush administration. In 2009, under the Obama administration, he was appointed as one of the first presidential science envoys. He was a senior fellow for the Bill and Melinda Gates Foundation from 2009 to 2010. From January 2011 until his retirement on June 30, 2018, he was the president of Global Research and Development at the pharmaceutical company Sanofi.

In October 2020, Zerhouni co-founded ModeX Therapeutics, a privately held biotechnology company focused on immune-based therapies for cancer and infectious diseases. In 2022, ModeX Therapeutics was acquired by OPKO Health, wherein Zerhouni was appointed as the vice-chairman and president.

== Early life and education ==
Zerhouni was born on April 12, 1951, in Nedroma, Algeria. After completing his M.D. from the University of Algiers' School of Medicine in 1975, he immigrated to the United States to study radiology at the Johns Hopkins School of Medicine.

== Career ==
From 1981 to 1985, he served as the vice-chair for the Department of Radiology at Eastern Virginia Medical School and its affiliated DePaul Hospital. In 1985, Zerhouni returned to Johns Hopkins School of Medicine as co-director of full-body CT and MRI, and was later promoted to associate professor. He was appointed director of the MRI division in 1988 and promoted to full professor in 1992. In 1995, he also became a professor of biomedical engineering at Hopkins. In 1996, Zerhouni was named as the chair of the radiology department and appointed as the executive vice-dean of the Johns Hopkins School of Medicine. He then served as vice-dean for Clinical Affairs and president of the Clinical Practice Association (1996–1999) and vice dean for Research (1999–2002).

In the early 1980s, Zerhouni established Computerized Imaging Reference Systems (CIRS) (now part of Mirion Technologies), which manufactured tissue-equivalent phantoms used in medical imaging and radiation therapy. He also established the Advanced Medical Imaging Institute, an integrated outpatient medical imaging center. Zerhouni also:

- Co-invented a breast biopsy method for diagnosing breast cancer.
- Co-founded Biopsys Medical, which was acquired by Johnson & Johnson in 1997.
- Co-founded a company with community-based radiologists that focused on providing advanced outpatient imaging services, which was later acquired by the American Radiology Services Corporation.

Zerhouni served as a consultant to the White House under President Ronald Reagan (1985) and to the World Health Organization (1988), and served on the National Cancer Institute's Board of Scientific Advisors (1998–2002).

== Role as Director of National Institutes of Health (2002–2008) ==
Zerhouni was appointed as the 15th director of the NIH by President George W. Bush. He was confirmed by the Senate in April 2002 and served until October 2008, becoming the first immigrant to serve as NIH director. He is known for establishing the NIH Roadmap for Medical Research, a plan to foster trans-NIH initiatives. The Roadmap drew criticism from researchers for diverting funding from traditional individual grants during a period of declining success rates. Despite this, the Roadmap drew support from Congress.

In his tenure as director, he implemented a ban on agency scientists consulting for pharmaceutical companies. He publicly diverged from the Bush administration's limits on federal financing of stem-cell research, testifying to Congress that it was limiting scientific progress. Additionally, he defended the value of sexual health research, which drew criticism from a Republican Congress.

Zerhouni implemented a policy requiring public access to NIH-funded research results.

Zerhouni is on the board of the Foundation for the National Institutes of Health.

== Post-NIH career ==
Following his tenure as NIH director, Zerhouni served as a presidential science and technology envoy for President Barack Obama and as a senior fellow at the Bill and Melinda Gates Foundation from 2009 to 2010.

During this period, the American Association for the Advancement of Science and Science magazine launched Science Translational Medicine, of which Zerhouni was a founding editor. He also served on the board of Actelion Pharmaceuticals.

In 2011, Zerhouni joined Sanofi as the head of Research and Development. He retired from Sanofi in June 2018.

Following his retirement from Sanofi in 2018, Zerhouni joined several boards, including Research!America, the Lasker Foundation, and the Danaher Corporation. He is a founding board member of the Davos Alzheimer's Collaborative (DAC). He also joined the board of directors of B-FLEXION (formerly Waypoint Capital).

In 2020, Zerhouni co-founded ModeX Therapeutics, a biotechnology company focusing on multi-specific biologic drugs for cancer and infectious diseases. The company's portfolio includes immunotherapies and vaccines for diseases such as cancer, HIV, SARS-CoV-2, and the Epstein–Barr virus.

In 2022, ModeX was acquired by OPKO Health and Zerhouni was appointed president and vice chairman. Under his leadership, ModeX entered a collaboration with Merck & Co. to develop an EBV vaccine and was awarded a contract from the U.S. Biomedical Advanced Research and Development Authority (BARDA) to advance treatments against viral infectious diseases.

== Memberships and awards ==
Zerhouni has served on the board of trustees of the King Abdullah University of Science and Technology.

He is an elected member of both the U.S. National Academy of Medicine and the U.S. National Academy of Engineering. He serves as an emeritus public trustee of the Mayo Clinic and is a member emeritus of the Radiological Society of North America. He is professor emeritus of radiology and biomedical engineering at Johns Hopkins University. Zerhouni also serves on the boards of Research America, the Foundation for the NIH, and the Lasker Foundation. He is also a founding board member of the Davos Alzheimer's Collaborative and a member of the French Academy of Medicine.

In 2008, French President Nicolas Sarkozy awarded Zerhouni the Legion of Honour for fostering collaboration between the NIH and the Pasteur Institute.

Government offices
Preceded by Harold Varmus	15th Director of National Institutes of Health; 2002 – 2008	Succeeded by Francis Collins
