= Charles M. Fernandez =

American businessman and entrepreneur

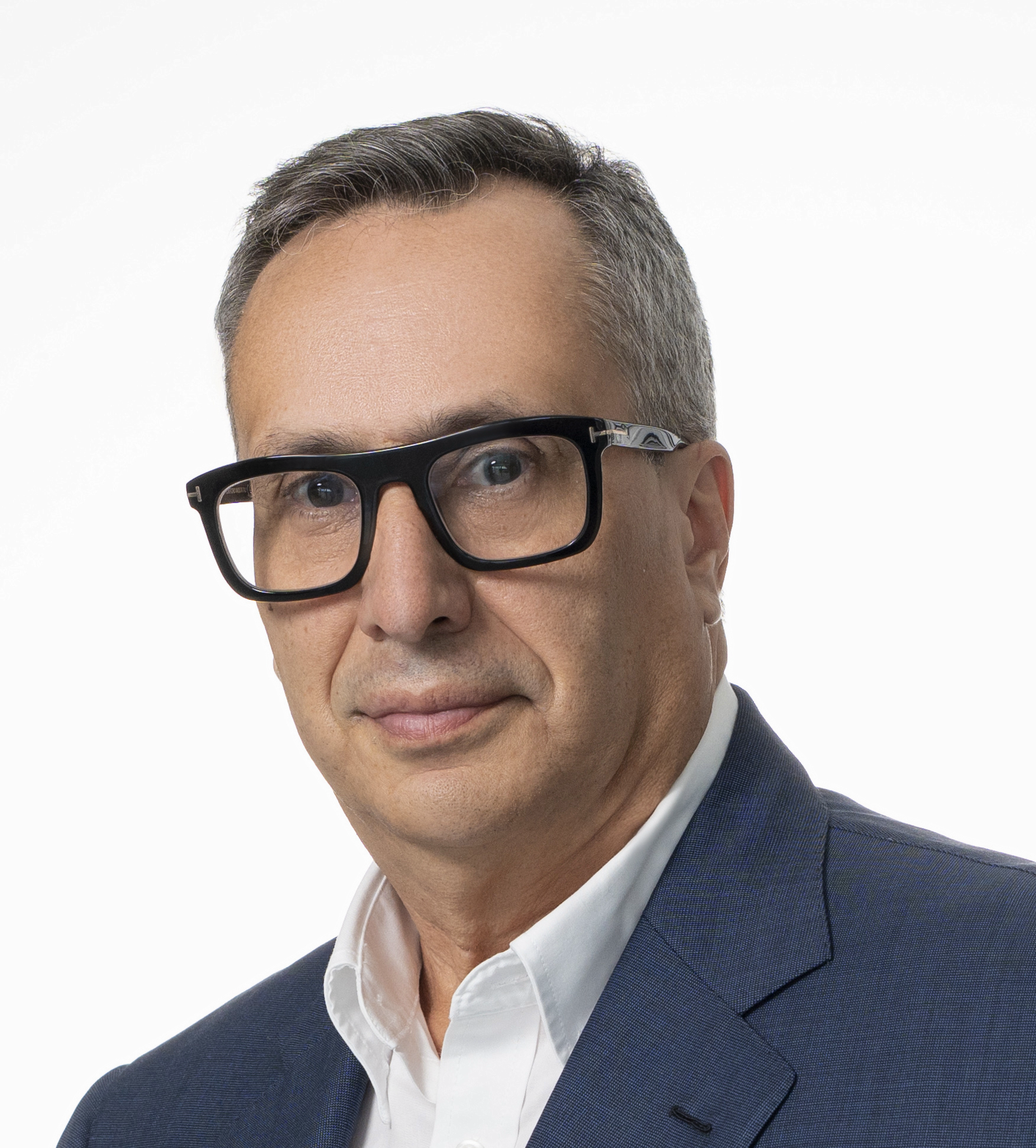
- Born: Queens, New York
- Education: B.S. Florida International University
- Occupation: CEO
- Known for: Founder of eAperion Solutions
- Spouse: Lauren Sturges-Fernandez

Charles M. Fernandez (born February 8, 1962) is executive chairman and chief executive officer of NextPlat, an e-commerce platform company.

== Early life and education ==
Fernandez was raised in Elmhurst, Queens. He is the son of Cuban immigrants. His father, Carlos, was an engineer for RCA. Fernandez moved to Miami in 1979. He attended Florida International University and graduated with a bachelor's degree in finance and international business.

== Career ==
Fernandez began his career in the radio business. He served as President of Viva America Media Group which owned the newspaper, Mi Casa, along with Radio Mambi and Radio Ritmo in Miami, Fl. Viva was acquired by Heftel Broadcasting in 1989, and Fernandez became COO. They received the Marconi Radio Award by the National Association of Broadcasters. In 1995, Fernandez moved into the Healthcare sector and co-founded Continucare, an outpatient service management company, with Phillip Frost. In 1997, George Soros, became the largest shareholder of Continucare owning 19.5% via the Soros Fund. In 1999, Fernandez returned to media. He became president and CEO of Big City Radio after its acquisition of Hispanic Media Holdings, a Spanish language online service provider founded by Fernandez and business partner Phillip Frost. Fernandez also served in various positions within IVAX, a generic drugmaker, founded by Frost, including Director and Chairman of the Audit Committee of the Board of Directors

He became president and co-manager of the Fairholme Fund in 2008. In 2010, it was announced that Fernandez had joined the Board of Directors of the St. Joe Company along with former Florida Governor Charlie Crist and Carnival Corp. COO Howard Frank. That same year, Fortune Magazine called Fernandez, “a restructuring whiz”. He accumulated $1.8 billion General Growth Property bonds and alongside Bill Ackman’s Pershing Square and Brookfield Asset Management they recapitalized GGP’s stock. In 2012, he left the Fairholme Fund to launch his own, Barnstar Opportunities Fund. In 2016, Fernandez became chairman and CEO of eApeiron Solutions, an e-commerce company utilizing Kodak anti-counterfeiting technology and an investment from Chinese e-commerce company Alibaba to combat knock-offs and promote brand integrity. In 2019, eApeiron was acquired by Smartrac, a unit of Avery Dennision Corporation with Fernandez serving on Smartrac's supervisory board of Directors.

== Personal life ==
Fernandez lives in Coral Gables, Florida with his wife Lauren Sturges-Fernandez.
