= Charles Fernandez =

Charles Fernandez may refer to:

- Charles Fernandez (politician) (born 1954), politician from Antigua and Barbuda
- Charles M. Fernandez (born 1962), executive chairman and chief executive officer of NextPlat
- Charles Hector Fernandez (born 1971), Malaysian human rights advocate and activist
- Charles Fernández (born 1995), Guatemalan modern pentathlete
- Sid Fernandez (Charles Sidney Fernandez, born 1962), American baseball player
