= Bruce R. Berkowitz =

American equity fund manager

Bruce Berkowitz
- Born: 1957 or 1958 (age 66–67)
- Education: B.S. University of Massachusetts Amherst
- Occupation: equity fund manager
- Known for: founder of Fairholme Capital Management
- Spouse: Tracey Pellows
- Children: 3

Bruce Robert Berkowitz is an American equity fund manager and registered investment adviser. Berkowitz founded Fairholme Capital Management in 1997 and was formerly a senior portfolio manager at Lehman Brothers Holdings and a managing director of Smith Barney. Berkowitz was named 2009 Domestic-Stock Fund Manager of the Year and Domestic-Stock Fund Manager of the Decade by Morningstar, Inc.

== Early life and education ==
Berkowitz, was raised in Chelsea, Massachusetts, the son of Hennie (née Schneider) and Barney Berkowitz. His father was a part-time taxi driver and owned a convenience store; his mother was a homemaker. Berkowitz attended Chelsea High School and Huntington Prep before graduating from Beaver Country Day School. In 1980, he graduated with a bachelor's degree in economics, cum laude, from the University of Massachusetts Amherst.

== Career ==
After college, Berkowitz worked at the Strategic Planning Institute, a management consulting firm, in Cambridge, Massachusetts. In 1983, he joined Merrill Lynch in London. In 1986 he accepted a job with Lehman Brothers in London and then transferred to their New Jersey office in 1989 as a senior portfolio manager. In 1993, he became a managing director of Smith Barney Investment Advisers.

In 1997, Berkowitz started his own firm, Fairholme Capital Management. The name of the firm "Fairholme" was the name of the last street on which he had lived.

In late 2010, it was announced that Berkowitz had joined the board of directors of the St. Joe Company. By 2011, Berkowitz and Fairholme’s president, Charles M. Fernandez, resigned from the board again to protest the firm’s strategy.

In 2016, Berkowitz joined the board of directors at American retailer Sears; at the time, he was the company’s largest external shareholder. He resigned again in 2017.

== Philanthropy ==
Berkowitz donated $6.75 million to the Center for Jewish History which is dedicated to the preservation of Jewish history and genealogy. His donation along with that of Bill Ackman, the CEO of hedge fund Pershing Square Capital Management, and Joseph Steinberg, the president of Leucadia National, were the three largest individual gifts that the center has ever received.

In 2014, Berkowitz first announced plans for a 4,200 m^{2} (45,000 sq ft) museum in Miami’s Edgewater neighbourhood designed specifically to house Richard Serra’s sculpture Passage of Time (2014) and James Turrell’s light installation Aten Reign (2013). After municipal and county officials in Miami initially blocked Berkowitz’s project, it was eventually approved in 2015. At the time, prominent Miami collectors and philanthropists including Dennis Scholl, Martin Margulies and Norman Braman had all spoken out publicly in support of Berkowitz’s proposal. Originally, the local office of international architecture firm Arquitectonica was attached to the project; by 2018, the Miami-based architecture firm Rene Gonzalez Architects was leading it. Construction on the project was expected to start in 2020 and be complete by 2023; in early 2021, amid the COVID-19 pandemic, Berkowitz abandoned the project.

In 2024, Berkowitz announced plans to build the Longleaf Art Park, a 15.5-acre park in Walton County, Florida, including a trapezoidal pavilion designed by OLI Architecture. The park will be created by the non-profit Berkowitz Contemporary Foundation (BCF), but its operations will be overseen by the local Cultural Arts Alliance of Walton County.

== Personal life ==
Berkowitz lives in Coral Gables, Florida. He has been married to Tracey (née Pellows) Berkowitz since 1980, and he has two sons and one daughter.
