= EBAN =

European trade association

European Business Angel Network
- Abbreviation: EBAN
- Established: 1999; 27 years ago
- Type: Trade association
- Purpose: Representing the Angel investor industry, coordinate between members and do research
- Location: Brussels, Belgium
- Region served: Europe
- Members: 100 organizations in 50 countries (2024)
- Official language: English
- President: Peter Cowley
- Funding: Members
- Website: www.eban.org

EBAN (European Business Angel Network) is an international, not-for-profit trade association whose function is to represent the pan-European early stage investor community, gathering member organisations and individuals from Europe and beyond. Originally targeted only to business angels, it later became a cross sector representative of equity early stage investors.

EBAN represents a sector estimated to invest 5.1billion Euros a year and comprising 260,000 angel investors. According to its annual collection of data (2012) and exclusively though business angel networks, 2,900 company were funded and 17,800 jobs were created.

== History ==
EBAN was established in 1999 by a group of pioneer angel networks in Europe with the collaboration of the European Commission and EURADA (the European Association of Development Agencies).

In 1999, only 50 business angel networks were identified across Europe to support high growth start-ups, with more than half operating in the UK. By 2016, the number of business angel networks has risen to 460.

== Activities ==
- Setting professional standards, training, and certification for the early stage investment asset class; building the capacity of early stage investment actors to facilitate co-investment as well as increasing transparency in the market by changing the culture on reporting standards.
- Benchmarking, research and networking with peers .
- Lobbying, trusted and continued dialogue with European policy makers to improve the working environment of early stage investors.
- Raising awareness, advocacy and capacity building.
- Cross-border syndication and co-investment support.

== Structure ==
=== Types of members ===
The following types of members are accepted since 31 December 2013:

- Business Angels
- Business angels networks
- Federations of business angels networks
- Early stage venture capital funds
- Business accelerators
- Electronic funding platforms
- Associate/ other early stage market players

=== Governance ===
EBAN is led by a Board of Directors elected for 2-year mandates. The Board selects a President and an Executive Committee which becomes involved in the day-to-day operations with the Secretariat.

=== EBAN Presidents ===
- 2018–present Peter Cowley, Martlet and Cambridge Angels, United Kingdom
- 2014-2018 Candace Johnson, Sophia Business Angels, France
- 2012-2014 Paulo Andrez, FNABA, Portugal
- 2010-2012 Brigitte Baumann, Go Beyond, Switzerland
- 2006-2010 Anthony Clarke, London Business Angels, United Kingdom
- 2003-2006 Peter Jungen, BAND, Germany

Before 2003, co-presidency system

=== Executive committee ===
Executive committee composition at (31-12-2013)

- Paulo Andrez, FNABA, Portugal (President)
- Ari Korhonen, FiBAN, Finland (Vice-President)
- Albert Colomer, ESBAN, Catalunya
- Baybars Altuntaş, TBAA, Turkey

== Annual events and past editions ==
=== Annual Congress ===
Two days annual meeting organized in order to debate the role of early stage investors in Europe as key players to foster growth, learning, lobbying and networking. Different speeches, workshops, venues and the awards ceremony for the EBAN annual prizes.

Edition	Year	Location
16th	25–27 May 2016	Porto, Portugal
15th	6–8 May 2015	Eindhoven, Netherlands
14th	13–14 May 2014	Dublin, Ireland
13th	13–14 May 2013	Vienna, Austria
12th	23–24 April 2012	Moscow, Russia
11th	12–13 May 2011	Warsaw, Poland
10th	15–16 April 2010	Istanbul, Turkey
9th	27–28 April 2009	Madrid, Spain
8th	14–15 April 2008	Arnhem, Netherlands
7th	16–17 April 2007	Estoril (Cascais), Portugal
6th	10–11 April 2006	Prague, Czech Republic
5th	3–4 March 2005	Paris, France
4th	13–14 November 2003	Milan, Italy
Prior	1999-2002	Düsseldorf, Germany; Rotterdam, Netherlands; Brussels, Belgium

=== EBAN University ===
Meeting organized in order to debate about different relevant themes linked with early stage investing and for learning and networking. Different speeches and workshops.

Edition	Year	Location
15th	29–30 November 2016	Zagreb, Croatia
14th	16–18 November 2015	Copenhagen, Denmark
13th	17–18 November 2014	Helsinki, Finland
12th	2–3 October 2013	Moscow, Russia
11th	17–18 January 2013	Istanbul, Turkey
10th	20–21 October 2011	Brussels, Belgium
9th	18–19 November 2010	Nice, France
8th	9–10 November 2009	Stockholm, Sweden
7th	31 October 2008	Kirchberg, Austria
6th	20 November 2007	Geneva, Switzerland
5th	23 November 2006	Brussels, Belgium
4th	16 November 2005	Brussels, Belgium
3rd	6–8 May 2004	St. George’s Bay, Malta
2nd	19–20 November 2003	Edinburgh, United Kingdom

== Past EBAN awards ==
=== Winners of the 9th EBAN Awards (2014) ===
- European Early Stage Investor of the Year: Jari Ovaskainen (Finland)
- Most Successful Firm Financed by Early Stage Investors: DecaWave (Ireland)
- Best Individual in globally engaging Early Stage Investors within the Entrepreneurial Ecosystem: Baybars Altuntas (Turkey)
- Best EBAN Member: Business Angels Copenhagen (Denmark)
- Best EBAN Newcomer: Estonian Business Angels Network (Estonia)
- Best European Business Angel Week Initiative: Startech Ventres (Greece)

=== Winners of the 8th EBAN Awards (2013) ===
- Business Angel of the Year: Dušan Stoiljković, True Global Ventures (Sweden)
- Business Angel Network of the Year: IESE BAN (Spain)
- Best Federation of the Year: HBAN (Ireland)
- Best Early Stage Fund: Vera Early Stage Fund (Finland)
- Best Performing New Member: Austrian Angels Investors Association (AAIA, Austria)

=== Winners of the 7th EBAN Awards (2012) ===
- Business Angel of the Year: Philippe Gluntz, Business Angel affiliated to Paris Business Angels (France)
- Deal of the Year: United Resins, submitted by FNABA (Portugal)
- Early Stage Fund of the Year: Zernike Meta Venture, submitted by META Group (Italy)
- Breakthrough Service/ Tool by a BAN: PEEX, submitted by Mountain Partners (Switzerland)
- Business Angel Network of the Year: FiBAN (Finland); Honorable Mention awarded to Paris Business Angels (France)

=== Winners of the 6th EBAN Awards (2011) ===
- Business Angel of the Year: Francesco Marini Clarelli (Italy)
- Deal of the Year: Polidea (Poland)
- Early Stage Fund of the Year: Seraphim (UK)
- Impact Investment of the Year: EKO-Logic (Poland)
- Breakthrough Service/ Tool by a BAN: Paris Business Angels (France) for Angelsoft (USA)

=== Winners of the 5th EBAN Awards (2010) ===
- Business angel of the year: Véronique Castelo (FR)
- Business angel group of the year: Sophia Business Angels (FR)
- Best investment in a social enterprise: Biogenera, submitted by Italian Angels for Growth and Meta Group (IT)
- Best early stage fund manager/team of the year: Succès Europe (FR)

=== Winners of the 4th EBAN Awards (2009) ===
- Business angel of the year: Cornelius Boersch (DE)
- European early stage fund manager/team: Guy Rigaud, Rhônes Alpes Création (FR)
- European business angel group leader/team: Paris Business Angels (FR)
- Best cross border deal: Tie between BUY VIP and Louise (EU)
- Most successful angel backed company: Aventiv (BE)
- Best lobbying initiative (in support of business angels and early stage investors): Italian Business Angels Network (IT)

=== Winners of the 3rd EBAN Awards (2008) ===
- Best team of the year: Greater London Enterprise (UK)
- Best business angel of the year: Nelson Gray (Scotland)
- Best syndicated deal (BA/VC): Swedish Venture Capital Association (SE)
- Best new initiative/new entrant on the market: The Ready for Equity! Project (EU)

=== Winners of the 2nd EBAN Awards (2007) ===
- BAN manager of the year: Finance South East for the South East Capital Alliance (UK)
- Best new initiative on the market: London Business Angels for The Creative Business Accelerator (UK)
- Business angel of the year: NeBIB for Hans Bertram (NL)
- Most promising exit: London Business Angels for Pout (UK)

=== Winners of the 1st EBAN Awards (2006) ===
- Most promising exit: London Business Angels (UK)
- Best benchmarking work: ESBAN (ES)
- Best new network tool practice: France Angels (FR)
- Best co-investment initiative: BANSON (DE)

== Involvement in European Projects ==
EBAN has collaborated with the following European Commission projects:

- ICT Finance MarketPlace/ Access ICT - European Platform for Access to ICT Investors (2010-2012)
- EASY - Early Stage Investor (2006-2008)
- Ready4Equity (2006-2008)
