= Cornelius Boersch =

German entrepreneur and venture capitalist

Cornelius Boersch (born April 11, 1968, in Hannover) is a German serial entrepreneur, technology investor, business angel, and author. He is the founder of the investment companies Mountain Partners AG and Conny & Co. Boersch is considered as one of the most active and well-known investors in the (European) technology and start-up scene and is the initiator of the annual Entrepreneurs Day at Tegernsee, Bavaria, which takes place annually since 2007. His best-known investments are Alando.de (predecessor of eBay Germany), Lieferando, the Scout Group (Autoscout, Immoscout), wefox, Kavak, and reBuy.

== Education and academic career ==
Boersch studied business administration at the European Business School in Oestrich-Winkel, Paris Business School and the University of Colorado from 1989 to 1994. In 1998, Boersch completed his doctorate on "Mutual savings banks and Venture Capital" at the University of Essen. He later also served as an honorary professor there.

== Investment career ==
Cornelius Boersch is working as an entrepreneur in Germany since 1991. He already founded his first company "Sabeco GmbH" during his studies, which was the beginning of the German electronic health card, and from which the smart card broker and RFID manufacturer ACG AG developed in 1995. ACG AG was originally listed on the stock exchange segment Neuer Markt in Germany (NEMAX 50) in 1999 with a valuation of more than EUR 1 billion.

Boersch sold his shares in the company in March 2000 and since 2003, the former ACG AG belonged to the Assa Abloy Group, which became insolvent in 2008. After Boersch withdrew from the operational business of ACG AG, he worked as an investment manager in the field of venture capital and subsequently initiated the development of other RFID-based companies such as Smartrac (IPO 2006) and Identiv (NASDAQ since 2006).

Boersch's focus lies mainly in investing in young Internet companies. As an active business angel, he has invested in more than 350 companies since 1995. He was able to sell more than 50 companies during this time, of which 14 went public. In 2009, Boersch was elected "European Business Angel of the Year". Additionally, he is part of the European Angels Fund initiative of the European Investment Fund (EIF), a EUR 800 million program that mirrors investments of selected business angels on a pari-passu basis.

In 2004, he founded Mountain Partners AG together with Daniel S. Wenzel, which is an investment company focusing on investments in technology startups and venture capital companies. Mountain Partners AG is mainly active in growth regions such as Latin America, South-East Asia, but still invests in Europe as well. In Latin America, Mountain Partners is one of the market-leading funds through Nazca. However, the investment company hardly invests directly in startups these days. Instead, it acts as a global multi-fund manager in the sense of a house of funds, through which it is currently invested in more than 120 companies.

In 2007, Boersch initiated for the first time the Entrepreneurs Day at Tegernsee, which is now held annually. The aim is to give entrepreneurs and investors a networking platform to exchange ideas in an informal atmosphere. The 2-day program includes annual key-notes on current topics, presentations of start-ups and investment opportunities as well as a social program. Meanwhile, the event is considered one of the most popular ones in the venture capital and private equity scene.

Beginning of 2019, Boersch founded another venture capital company, namely "Conny & Co". This company has no particular industry focus but again concentrates geographically on growth markets. The current portfolio includes recent highlights such as Flash Coffee, Albo, and Luuna.

== Politics ==
Politically, Boersch worked as an advisor to Dr. Guido Westerwelle, the former German foreign minister, for 12 years. He organized his election campaigns and in 2009 was the founder of the first digital election campaign in Germany. In the course of this, he also accompanied Guido Westerwelle on trips abroad (Estonia, Japan and the People's Republic of China) and donated around EUR 160,000 to the FDP.

== Authorship ==
Boersch published four German books between 2006 and 2009, each co-authored with renowned personalities from politics and business. All of these are united in the book title by the word Summa Summarum, and the first three works deal in particular with topics from the everyday life of a manager. His fourth book in this series "Das Summa Summarum der Politik und Wirtschaft" ("The Summa Summarum of Politics and Business"), which he co-authored with Guido Westerwelle, was published in 2009. His latest book, "Zukunft verpasst_?" (“Future missed”), was published in 2020 together with Dr. Thomas Middelhoff. In this, the both authors discuss the state of digitalisation in Germany and the impact of the COVID-19 pandemic on it.

=== Publications ===
Boersch wrote most of his books in German and therefore, the list includes the original titles in German language (except "ONE").

- Cornelius Boersch & Friedrich Diest (2006). Das Summa Summarum des Erfolgs. Die 25 wichtigsten Werke für Motivation, Effektivität und persönlichen Erfolg. ISBN 978-3-8349-9251-2
- Cornelius Boersch & Rainer Elschen (2007). Das Summa Summarum des Management. Die 25 wichtigsten Werke für Strategie, Führung und Veränderung. ISBN 978-3-8349-9320-5
- Cornelius Boersch, Christian Holubarsch, Helmut Soikker, Hans-Reinhard Zerkowski (2008). Das Summa Summarum der Gesundheit. 20 wichtige Aspekte zu Gesundheit und Wohlbefinden für Manager und Führungskräfte. ISBN 978-3-8349-9683-1
- Cornelius Boersch & Guido Westerwelle (2009). Das Summa Summarum von Politik und Wirtschaft. Ein Überblick über die wichtigsten wirtschaftlich-politischen Auseinandersetzungen der Gegenwart. ISBN 978-3-8349-1473-6
- Cornelius Boersch & Thomas Middelhoff (2020). Zukunft verpasst?_. Warum Deutschland die Digitalisierung verschlafen hat. Und wie uns die Krise hilft, den Anschluss doch noch zu schaffen. ISBN 978-3-86334-284-5
- Cornelius Boersch, Crina Ancuta & Dorina Serban (2024). ONE: Your Compass to Living Your One Life to the Fullest. ISBN 978-3-948615-35-2

== Honors and awards ==
- 2000 "Deutscher Unternehmerpreis", awarded by Harvard Clubs of Germany.
- 2000 "Entrepreneur of the Year", awarded by Ernst & Young Consulting GmbH for the business concept of ACG AG.
- 2009 "Business Angel of the Year," awarded by the European Trade Association for Business Angels and Early Stage Investors (EBAN).
