= MetCare =

Metropolitan Health Networks, Inc.
- Company type: Public
- Traded as: NYSE: MDF
- Industry: Healthcare
- Founded: 1996
- Defunct: 2012
- Fate: Acquired
- Successor: Humana
- Headquarters: United States
- Website: www.metcare.com

Metropolitan Health Networks, Inc. (MetCare) is an American health care service company providing services network (PSN) operation. The company was founded in 1996 and is based in Boca Raton, Florida. As of December 21, 2011 the company has delivered services through 33 wholly owned care practices, an ontology practice and 450 independent primary practices. Its service practices cover over 20 counties in the state of Florida. The company provides medical care to about 87,500 people. In 2012, the company was awarded as one of America's Best Small Companies by Forbes.

== Background ==
MetCare was founded in 1996 and began operations as a physician practice in Florida. The first business partner of the company was Humana. Thanks to the policy of Medicare Advantage membership, the company developed rapidly in 2003, delivering more services to more counties. The company acquired 35 primary care centers in Florida from MetCare of Florida and Continucare Corporation. From then on, it operated the business through its two subsidiaries, MetCare of Florida and Continucare Corporation. In 2012, the company was acquired by Humana, for over $850 million.

== Managers ==
- President - Grace Hodge
- Chief Medical Information Officer - William H. McCoy III
