= Peter Cowley =

English tech businessman (1955–2024)

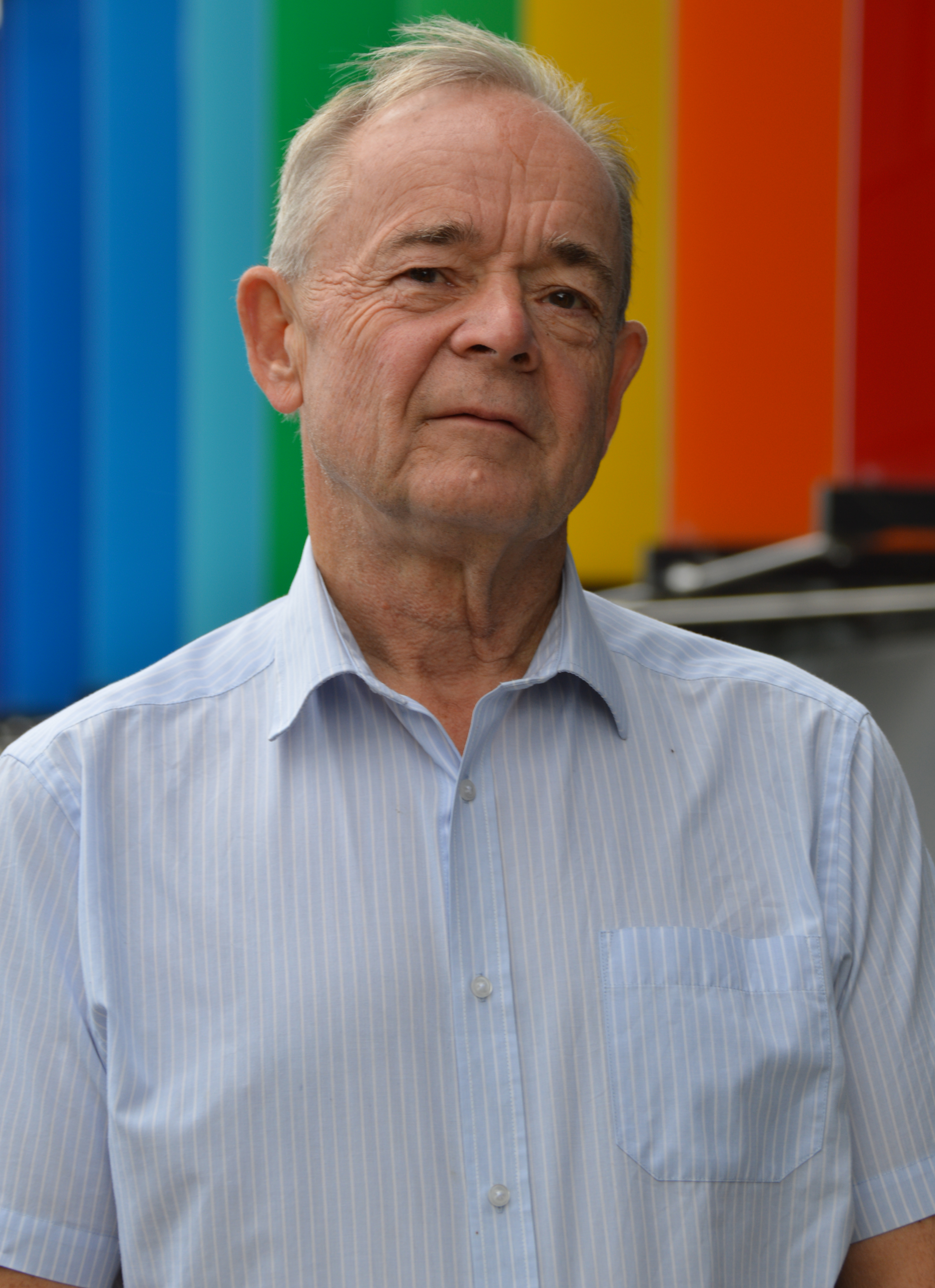
- Cowley in 2021
- Born: 30 September 1955; Kingston-upon-Hull, England
- Died: 16 November 2024 (aged 69); Cambridge, England
- Education: Cambridge University MA; Anglia Ruskin University Honorary Doctorate
- Occupations: Tech businessman, angel investor, author
- Family: 3
- Website: www.petercowley.org

Peter Cowley (30 September 1955 – 16 November 2024) was a British tech businessman, angel investor and speaker based in Cambridge, England. He was co-founder of VC Martlet Capital, President of the European Business Angels Network (EBAN). and was chair of the Cambridge Angels.

Cowley suffered from late stage cancer from late 2021, and helped other sufferers and their caregivers. His book about his experience of personal tragedy, terminal illness and business successes: Public Success Private Grief was published in April 2024. It was featured in The Times in January 2024.

== Education ==
Cowley attended Hymers College, Hull and then gained an MA in Engineering and Computer Science from Fitzwilliam College, Cambridge University, Cowley gained qualifications from the Open University and Association of Chartered Certified Accountants. In July 2023, Cowley was awarded an honorary doctorate in business administration from Anglia Ruskin University.

== Career ==
Among the technology and property development businesses he has founded are Camdata, and Ept Computing, which was acquired by Redgate Software in 2009.

Cowley invested in over 75 technology startups. He was President Emeritus of the European Business Angels Network EBAN and was a board member of the Global Business Angels Network (GBAN), part of Global Entrepreneurs Network.

A member of the Investment Committee of the Angel CoFund, a £100 million UK Government-backed fund for supporting and growing British SMEs and was on the board of the UK Business Angels Association, where he was awarded UK Angel of the Year in 2014.

A Fellow in Entrepreneurship at the Cambridge Judge Business School, Cowley was also a council member of the Cambridge Computer Lab Ring, and chair of supporters and a member of the Steering Committee of ideaSpace, the Cambridge University incubator.

In 2016, he co-founded CAMentrepreneurs, which supports business and social entrepreneurship among Cambridge University students, alumni and others worldwide, and served as its chairperson. His legacy is recognised on the CAMentrepreneurs website here

In 2026 EBAN - the European Business Angels Network EBAN created the Invested Investor Peter Cowley Award to honour his memory..

== Publications ==
In 2018, Cowley authored a book on angel investment titled The Invested Investor and in 2019, a second titled Founder to Founder. He tells the story of his Cancer journey via Project Cancer and its associated Youtube Channel. His third book, co-authored with Liesbeth Blom was published in April 2024. Public Success, Private Grief detailed his life, his successes and how he coped with and grew from the loss of two younger siblings, the death of his first wife, the suicide of two of his sons, his alcoholism (until 2000) and his advanced cancer.

== Death ==
On 18 November 2024, it was announced that Cowley had died from cancer at the age of 69.
