= OPKO Health =

Medical test and medication company

OPKO Health, Inc.
- Type: Public
- Traded as: Nasdaq: OPK; Russell 2000 Component TASE: OPK
- Industry: Medical Appliances & Equipment
- Founded: 1991; 35 years ago
- Headquarters: Miami, Florida
- Products: Medical Products
- Number of employees: 6,096
- Website: opko.com

OPKO Health, Inc. is a medical test and medication company focused on diagnostics and pharmaceuticals. The company is a publicly traded company on NASDAQ and TASE under the symbol "OPK".

== History ==
OPKO Health is a diversified healthcare company present in more than 30 countries. The company's primary businesses include

- Bioreference Laboratories, a clinical laboratory with a core genetic testing business
- The 4K Test Score, a blood test for prostate cancer
- Pharmaceutical development, with products such as Rayaldee
- Varubi, a chemotherapy inducted nausea medication

As of 2024, the chairman and CEO of OPKO is Phillip Frost.

In May 2022, OPKO Health announced the acquisition for $300 million of U.S. based Biotechnology firm, ModeX. With it OPKO gained proprietary immunotherapy technology for infectious diseases and oncology.

== Litigation ==
On September 7, 2018, the SEC filed a lawsuit against a number of individuals and entities including Opko Health and the CEO and chairman, Phillip Frost. In December 2018, the company and Dr. Frost entered into settlements with the SEC, which, upon approval by the court in January 2019, resolved the claims. Without admitting or denying any of the allegations, the company agreed to an injunction from violations of Section 13(d) of the “Exchange Act”, a strict liability claim, and to pay a $100,000 penalty, which has been paid.

On March 8, 2019, the SEC filed an amended complaint, with OPKO paying US$100,000 "Without admitting or denying the SEC's allegations."
