= MusclePharm =

American nutritional supplement company

- Company type: Public
- Traded as: OTCQB: MSLP
- Industry: Dietary supplement
- Founded: Denver, Colorado, USA 2006
- Headquarters: Las Vegas, Nevada, United States
- Key people: Eric Hillman (CEO)
- Revenue: $102.16 million (2017)
- Website: MusclePharm Official Website

MusclePharm Corporation is an American nutritional supplement company founded in 2006, Denver, CO and headquartered in Las Vegas, Nevada.

== History ==
MusclePharm Corporation was incorporated on August 4, 2006. On February 18, 2010, the company acquired Muscle Pharm, LLC, and as a result, MusclePharm then became a wholly owned subsidiary. In 2021, MusclePharm named Sabina Rizvi its first president and CFO. In 2023, MusclePharm named Eric Hillman CEO.

=== Legal disputes and events ===
2020

MusclePharm subleased its Burbank, CA office and legally relocated to Calabasas, CA.

2018

In 2018, MusclePharm announced that it was relocating its headquarters from Denver, CO to Burbank, CA as a part of a restructuring deal.

2016

Protein supplement maker Hi-Tech Pharmaceuticals sued MusclePharm for artificially inflating the level of protein in its Arnold Schwarzenegger Series Iron Mass product - claiming MusclePharm lied to consumers about the amount of actual protein in the product, violating federal competition and state consumer protection laws.

MusclePharm was sued by Capstone Nutrition for breach of contract. Capstone alleged that MusclePharm has breached the parties' manufacturing contract and is seeking $65 million in damages.

2015

MusclePharm signed a development and manufacturing supply agreement with Capstone Nutrition and purchased a 20% interest in Capstone's parent company (INI).

MusclePharm was charged by the U.S. Securities and Exchange Commission with infractions related to a multitude of accounting and disclosure violations. The investigation had found that MusclePharm failed to report, or grossly misrepresented, approximately $500,000 in benefits paid to three current or former executives and chairmen. The SEC also discovered that MusclePharm issued stock without a registration statement when it entered into numerous transactions with third parties that agreed in exchange for company shares to pay cash to MusclePharm vendors. MusclePharm owed vendors approximately $1.1 million in outstanding invoices and was short on funds to pay them the money.

2014

MusclePharm acquired BioZone Laboratories, which included its facility in Richmond, California. This acquisition included BioZone's QuSomes, HyperSorb and, EquaSome technologies, as well as various lines of products including the Arnold Schwarzenegger series in 2013. The acquisition was finalized in late 2013. MusclePharm sold Biozone to Valencia, CA-based Flavor Producers for $9.8 million in April 2016.

2013

MusclePharm Corp. announced plans to buy back $5 million of all common stock in December 2013. In 2013 MusclePharm Corporation completed a $12 million registered direct offering of its Series D Convertible Preferred Stock. The Frost Group, LLC, headed by Miami entrepreneur, and billionaire, Phillip Frost, was the lead investor in the offering and elected to increase its previously announced investment in the offering to a total of $2.9 million.

2012

Marina Ventures sought to force MusclePharm's sale of 21 million shares of common stock.

Inter-Mountain Capital sued MusclePharm for alleged failure to sell, seeking damages of $4 million.

John's Lone Star Distribution alleged in a suit that MusclePharm entered into illegal price discrimination contracts with a Lone Star competitor with the intention of removing Lone Star from the market.

NSF International notified the public that a MusclePharm product improperly bore the "NSF Certified for Sport" mark. In December 2013, NSF launched a lawsuit against MusclePharm and declared that MusclePharm is not authorized to use any NSF certification marks, to claim that any of its products are certified by NSF, or to claim that they have been manufactured in an NSF GMP certified or registered facility.

The Tawnsaura Group sued MusclePharm for patent infringement.

2011

Environmental Research Center (ERC) filed a notice of intent to start litigation against over 200 nutrition and supplement companies, including MusclePharm, alleging violations of California Proposition 65.

I'm a lawsuit, ThermoLife claimed that MusclePharm infringed ThermoLife's patent on amino acid compounds including creatine nitrate.

2006

MusclePharm was first incorporated.

== Ownership ==
MusclePharm is a publicly traded company (ticker symbol MSLP). .
