= Continucare Corporation =

Medical care service company in Florida

- Type: Public
- Traded as: NYSE: CNU; AMEX: CNU
- Industry: medical service
- Founded: 1996
- Headquarters: Florida, United States
- Key people: Phillip Frost
- Revenue: $333 million
- Number of employees: 870
- Website: www.continucare.com

Continucare Corporation is a publicly traded medical care service company with 18 medical centers located in Florida, United States. Founded in 1996 in Miami, Florida, the company provides its service on an outpatient basis and offers medical management services for independent medical facilities as well as independent physician affiliates a group of physicians and healthcare professionals . As of December 2006, the company has served about 40,000 patients. In 2011, the company was acquired Metropolitan Health Networks, Inc. at a cost of about $416 million.
