= Phillip Frost =

American entrepreneur (born 1936)

- Born: 1936 (age 89–90)
- Education: University of Pennsylvania (BA; Albert Einstein College of Medicine (MD)
- Spouse: Patricia Orr

Phillip Frost (born c. 1936) is an American entrepreneur.

== Early life and education ==
Frost was born into an observant Jewish family in the United States. He has two elder brothers, who are 15 and 16 years older than him respectively. Both brothers fought in World War II, one in the Air Force and one in the Army. At 13, he got his first job, working in a local hardware shop after school. Frost earned a B.A. in French literature from the University of Pennsylvania, in 1957. He received an M.D. degree from the Albert Einstein College of Medicine, in 1961 and attended the University of Paris, from 1955 to 1956.

== Career ==
He served as a lieutenant commander, U.S. Public Health Service at the National Cancer Institute, from 1963 to 1965. Frost was a professor of dermatology at the University of Miami School of Medicine, from 1966 to 1972. He was chairman of the department of dermatology at Mt. Sinai Medical Center of Greater Miami, Miami Beach, Florida, from 1972 to 1990.

=== Key Pharmaceuticals ===
Michael Jaharis and Frost bought Key Pharmaceuticals, Inc. in 1972. Frost was chairman of the board of directors of Key Pharmaceuticals, from 1972, until its acquisition by Schering-Plough in 1986, for $835 million. Frost's share was $100 million. Frost's estimated net worth in 1986 was $150 million.

=== Ivax Corporation ===
Frost served as chairman of the board of directors and chief executive officer of Miami pharmaceutical manufacturer Ivax Corporation from 1987. He sold Ivax in January 2006, for $7.4 billion, to Israel-based Teva Pharmaceuticals.

=== Teva Pharmaceutical Industries ===
Frost became vice chairman of Teva Pharmaceutical Industries in January 2006, when Teva acquired Ivax Corporation. He was named the chairman of the board of Teva, in March 2010 and was reelected to the position in May 2012 before stepping down in 2015.

=== Protalix BioTherapeutics ===
Frost was one of the first and largest investors in Protalix BioTherapeutics, investing $21 million in the company that would later go on to develop a U.S. Food and Drug Administration-approved treatment for Gaucher disease. He resigned from the company's board of directors in 2007. A 2010 U.S. Securities and Exchange Commission filing indicated that Frost donated around $8 million in Protalix shares to a charitable organization.

=== Current business ===
Frost became the CEO and chairman of OPKO Health, Inc. upon the consummation of the merger of Acuity Pharmaceuticals Inc., Froptix Corporation and eXegenics, Inc., on March 27, 2007. Frost and OPKO were charged on September 7, 2018, with participating in a "pump and dump" scheme to defraud investors. Frost is accused by the U.S. Securities and Exchange Commission of violations of multiple sections of the Securities Act of 1933 and of the Securities Exchange Act of 1934.

He was named chairman of the board of Ladenburg Thalmann Financial Services, an investment banking, asset management, and securities brokerage firm, providing services through its principal operating subsidiary, Ladenburg Thalmann & Co. Inc., in July 2006; and has been a director of Ladenburg Thalmann, since March 2005. Frost also serves as chairman of the board of directors of PROLOR Biotech, Inc. (NYSE Amex: PBTH), a development stage biopharmaceutical company.

He is also a director of Castle Brands (NYSE Amex:ROX), a developer and marketer of premium brand spirits, and Continucare Corporation (NYSE Amex:CNU), a provider of outpatient healthcare services. He previously served as a director for Northrop Grumman Corp., SearchMedia Holding Limited (NYSE Amex:IDI) formerly Ideation Acquisition Corp., Protalix Bio Therapeutics, Inc., and SafeStitch Medical Inc., and as governor and co-vice-chairman of the American Stock Exchange, (now NYSE Amex).

According to the most recent SEC Filings, Frost's ownership in Chromadex is about 3.15%, split between individual ownership and his foundation. In 2011, Frost became the largest shareholder in Coconut Grove Bank, the oldest bank in South Florida.

In January 2013, Frost began investing in MusclePharm MSLP, with an initial $1.4 Million. As of December 31, 2014, Frost increased his investment to 386,928 Shares currently worth over $3 Million.

In 2014, he invested $825,000 in Drone Aviation Holding Corp., and joined their strategic advisory board.

In May 2014, Frost became a director and 10% shareholder of Senesco Technologies, which changed its name to Sevion Therapeutics, in September 2014.

As of December 2014, Frost serves on the board of directors and is a 10% owner of Cocrystal Pharma, Inc., which was formed from a merger of BioZone Pharmaceuticals, Inc. and Cocrystal Discovery Inc. This company has also recently released news of a merger with RFS Pharma, adding even more expertise to the company focusing on advanced antiviral development.

According to SEC Filings dated April 19, 2023, Frost's ownership interest in VERU is about 6.1%.

== Philanthropy ==
On October 16, 2003, a $33 million gift to the School of Music was announced by the University of Miami. In honor of their bequest, the largest ever given to a university-based music school in the U.S. at the time, the School of Music was officially renamed the Phillip and Patricia Frost School of Music. In 2003, the Art Museum at Florida International University was officially renamed The Patricia & Phillip Frost Art Museum. On March 26, 2011, it was announced that Frost had donated $35 million towards the construction of the new Miami Science Museum building at Bicentennial Park in Downtown Miami, named the Phillip and Patricia Frost Museum of Science. In March 2015, he donated an additional $10 million to support the development of the science museums' planetarium, the Frost Planetarium.

He serves on the board of regents of the Smithsonian Institution, as a member of the board of trustees of the University of Miami, the Scripps Research Institute, the Miami Jewish Home for the Aged, chairman of the board of Temple Emanu-El in Miami Beach, Florida, and Mount Sinai Medical Center.

The Frost family supports scholarships for advanced study at the University of Oxford in STEM (science, technology, engineering, and mathematics) subjects. The scholarships are open to Israeli students and students from Florida.

A new set of STEM institutes was announced on January 23, 2017, by University of Miami President Julio Frenk at the 50th annual Miami Winter Symposium which was attended by over 100 scientists, researchers and doctors from 28 countries. The initiative is funded by a $100 million gift by the Frosts announced during Frenk's inauguration last year to support basic and applied sciences and engineering. A portion of the $100 million gift will be used for construction of a modern science and engineering building on the university's Coral Gables campus, to be named the Phillip and Patricia Frost Science and Engineering Building. Of the gift, $30 million is designated to the creation of at least 13 chairs in STEM fields, with $3 million set aside for graduate student support.

== Personal life ==
Frost is married to Patricia Orr, an elementary school principal.

They live on a six-acre parcel on Star Island, Miami Beach.
