= Smartrac =

Smartrac N.V.
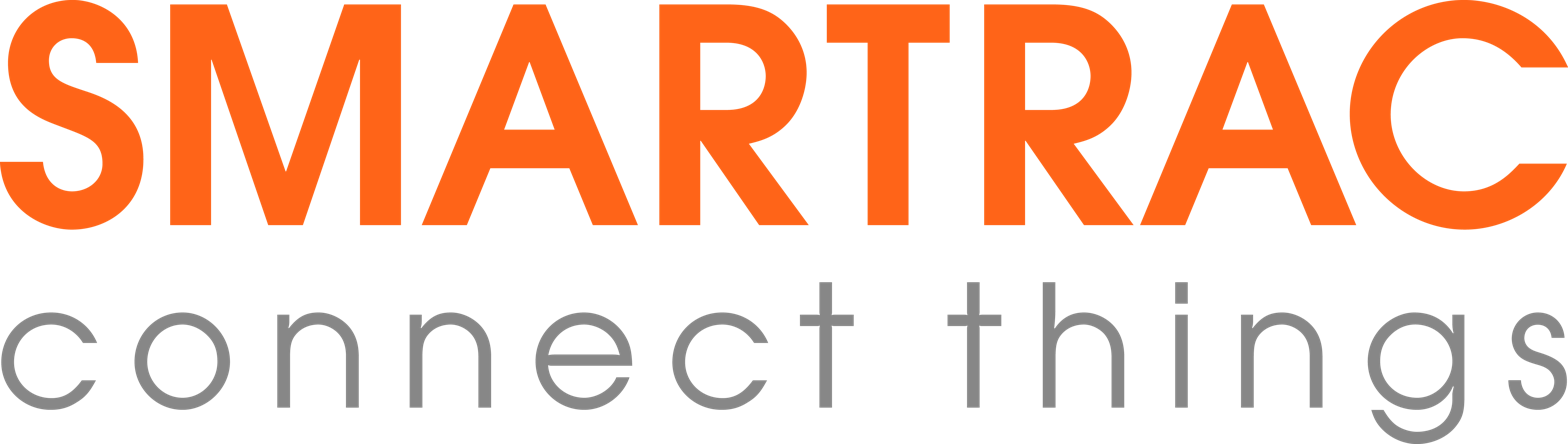
- Type: Naamloze vennootschap
- Traded as: FWB: SM7
- Industry: Electronics
- Founded: 2000
- Headquarters: Amsterdam, Netherlands
- Key people: Christian Uhl (CEO and chairman of the management board), Bernd Fahrholz (Chairman of the supervisory board)
- Products: RFID inlays and tags for biometric passports, bank cards, driving licences and contactless smart cards
- Revenue: € 272 million (2014)
- Number of employees: 3,600 (end 2010)

Smartrac N.V. is a Dutch manufacturer of high security RFID inlays. It is the world's largest supplier of inlays for ePassports. Since 2006, its shares are listed on the Frankfurt Stock Exchange.

The JPMorgan-owned private equity firm One Equity Partners agreed to the leveraged buyout of Smartrac on 30 August 2010, resulting in the removal of the company from the TecDAX index on 19 November 2010.

In November 2019, Smartrac Technology Group announced a binding agreement with Avery Dennison Corporation to sell its RFID transponder business. The acquisition was completed in March 2020.
