= Timeline of first ambassadorial appointments of Iceland by country =

This is a timeline of first ambassadorial appointments of Iceland by country.

== Timeline ==
#	Host country	Ambassador	Appointment	Ref
1	Denmark	Sveinn Björnsson	16 August 1920	Ref
2	United States	Thor Thors	23 October 1941	Ref
3	United Kingdom	Pétur Benediktsson	13 December 1941	Ref
4	Norway	Pétur Benediktsson	4 May 1942	Ref
5	Soviet Union	Pétur Benediktsson	21 January 1944	Ref
6	France	Pétur Benediktsson	10 January 1946	Ref
7	Poland	Pétur Benediktsson	5 February 1946	Ref
8	Belgium	Pétur Benediktsson	13 February 1946	Ref
9	Czechoslovakia	Pétur Benediktsson	30 April 1946	Ref
10	Italy	Pétur Benediktsson	3 September 1947	Ref
11	Canada	Thor Thors	19 September 1947	Ref
12	Finland	Jakob Möller	29 December 1947	Ref
13	Switzerland	Pétur Benediktsson	3 May 1949	Ref
14	Netherlands	Stefán Þorvarðsson	28 July 1949	Ref
14	Portugal	Pétur Benediktsson	28 July 1949	Ref
14	Spain	Pétur Benediktsson	28 July 1949	Ref
17	Sweden	Helgi P. Briem	28 December 1950	Ref
18	Iran	Helgi P. Briem	5 May 1951	Ref
19	Ireland	Pétur Benediktsson	3 July 1951	Ref
20	Israel	Helgi P. Briem	23 August 1951	Ref
21	Argentina	Thor Thors	24 March 1952	Ref
21	Brazil	Thor Thors	24 March 1952	Ref
23	Germany	Vilhjálmur Finsen	22 October 1952	Ref
24	Yugoslavia	Helgi P. Briem	29 April 1953	Ref
25	Hungary	Pétur Thorsteinsson	28 July 1955	Ref
26	Cuba	Thor Thors	7 February 1956	Ref
27	Romania	Pétur Thorsteinsson	30 May 1956	Ref
28	Japan	Magnús V. Magnússon	22 April 1958	Ref
29	Turkey	Stefán Jóhann Stefánsson	21 October 1958	Ref
30	Greece	Agnar Klemens Jónsson	4 December 1958	Ref
31	Luxembourg	Pétur Thorsteinsson	1 June 1962	Ref
32	Mexico	Thor Thors	13 May 1964	Ref
33	Bulgaria	Kristinn Guðmundsson	29 April 1965	Ref
34	Austria	Árni Tryggvason	19 July 1965	Ref
35	Peru	Hannes Kjartansson	1 September 1970	Ref
36	Egypt	Henrik Sveinsson Björnsson	10 November 1970	Ref
36	Ethiopia	Henrik Sveinsson Björnsson	10 November 1970	Ref
38	Nigeria	Guðmundur Ívarsson Guðmundsson	1 January 1971	Ref
39	China	Sigurður Bjarnason	25 September 1973	Ref
40	East Germany	Oddur Guðjónsson	18 December 1973	Ref
41	India	Pétur Thorsteinsson	20 November 1976	Ref
42	Pakistan	Pétur Thorsteinsson	7 December 1976	Ref
43	The Bahamas	Hans G. Andersen	17 March 1977	Ref
44	Mongolia	Hannes Jónsson	25 May 1977	Ref
45	Tanzania	Haraldur Kröyer	17 November 1977	Ref
46	Holy See	Niels P. Sigurðsson	3 December 1977	Ref
47	Thailand	Pétur Thorsteinsson	4 December 1977	Ref
48	Kenya	Haraldur Kröyer	10 February 1978	Ref
49	Iraq	Pétur Thorsteinsson	20 April 1978	Ref
50	Albania	Ingvi S. Ingvarsson	29 September 1978	Ref
51	Bangladesh	Pétur Thorsteinsson	23 November 1978	Ref
52	Cape Verde	Einar Benediktsson	24 September 1979	Ref
53	Tunisia	Pétur Thorsteinsson	11 November 1980	
54	Saudi Arabia	Ingvi S. Ingvarsson	1 December 1981	Ref
55	North Korea	Pétur Thorsteinsson	2 April 1982	Ref
56	South Korea	Pétur Thorsteinsson	19 April 1982	Ref
57	Cyprus	Sigurður Bjarnason	10 June 1983	Ref
58	Australia	Pétur Thorsteinsson	17 April 1984	Ref
59	Indonesia	Pétur Thorsteinsson	1 April 1985	Ref
60	Chile	Ingvi S. Ingvarsson	12 November 1987	Ref
61	Uruguay	Tómas Á. Tómasson	5 July 1991	Ref
62	Venezuela	Tómas Á. Tómasson	12 July 1991	Ref
63	Lithuania	Ingvi S. Ingvarsson	17 September 1991	Ref
64	Estonia	Sigríður Ásdís Snævarr	24 September 1991	Ref
65	Latvia	Sigríður Ásdís Snævarr	26 September 1991	Ref
66	Russia	Ólafur Egilsson	8 December 1991	Ref
67	Liechtenstein	Hjálmar W. Hannesson	26 June 1992	Ref
68	Ukraine	Ólafur Egilsson	3 June 1993	Ref
69	Slovenia	Sigríður Ásdís Snævarr	15 September 1993	Ref
70	Czech Republic	Eiður Svanberg Guðnason	9 November 1993	Ref
71	Slovakia	Eiður Svanberg Guðnason	11 November 1993	Ref
72	Namibia	Sigríður Ásdís Snævarr	26 January 1994	Ref
73	Georgia	Gunnar Gunnarsson	8 January 1996	Ref
74	South Africa	Sigríður Ásdís Snævarr	25 April 1996	Ref
75	North Macedonia	Eiður Svanberg Guðnason	24 October 1996	Ref
76	Vietnam	Hjálmar W. Hannesson	15 November 1996	Ref
77	Costa Rica	Einar Benediktsson	31 January 1997	Ref
78	Moldova	Gunnar Gunnarsson	17 April 1997	Ref
79	Andorra	Sverrir H. Gunnlaugsson	17 July 1997	Ref
80	Bosnia and Herzegovina	Róbert Trausti Árnason	19 February 1998	Ref
81	Mozambique	Sigríður Ásdís Snævarr	10 August 1998	Ref
82	New Zealand	Ólafur Egilsson	22 October 1999	Ref
83	Armenia	Jón Egill Egilsson	23 November 1999	Ref
84	Turkmenistan	Jón Egill Egilsson	5 May 2000	Ref
85	Uzbekistan	Jón Egill Egilsson	8 February 2001	Ref
86	Barbados	Þorsteinn Ingólfsson	30 April 2001	Ref
87	Serbia and Montenegro	Svavar Gestsson	21 February 2002	
88	Malawi	Björn Dagbjartsson	29 May 2002	Ref
89	Croatia	Jón Egill Egilsson	12 June 2002	Ref
90	Jamaica	Þorsteinn Ingólfsson	20 January 2003	Ref
91	Sri Lanka	Svavar Gestsson	8 August 2003	Ref
92	Singapore	Ólafur Egilsson	23 September 2003	Ref
93	Malaysia	Ólafur Egilsson	1 October 2003	Ref
94	Lebanon	Sverrir H. Gunnlaugsson	24 October 2003	Ref
95	Kazakhstan	Benedikt Jónsson	5 November 2003	Ref
96	Malta	Sverrir H. Gunnlaugsson	11 December 2003	Ref
97	Azerbaijan	Benedikt Jónsson	18 February 2004	Ref
98	Kyrgyzstan	Benedikt Jónsson	10 March 2004	Ref
99	Panama	Guðmundur Eiríksson	30 March 2004	Ref
100	Dominican Republic	Hjálmar W. Hannesson	2 August 2004	Ref
101	Colombia	Guðmundur Eiríksson	27 August 2004	Ref
102	Kuwait	Stefán Skjaldarson	2 November 2004	Ref
103	Cambodia	Ólafur Egilsson	14 December 2004	Ref
104	Nicaragua	Guðmundur Eiríksson	22 April 2005	Ref
105	Grenada	Hjálmar W. Hannesson	28 April 2005	Ref
106	Uganda	Benedikt Ásgeirsson	12 May 2005	Ref
107	Belarus	Benedikt Jónsson	7 June 2005	Ref
108	Philippines	Þórður Ægir Óskarsson	10 June 2005	Ref
109	Tajikistan	Benedikt Jónsson	15 February 2006	Ref
110	Serbia	Svavar Gestsson	5 June 2006	Ref
111	Lesotho	Sigríður Dúna Kristmundsdóttir	6 September 2007	Ref
112	Montenegro	Sveinn Björnsson	17 September 2007	Ref
113	Syria	Guðmundur Árni Stefánsson	4 December 2007	Ref
114	Botswana	Sigríður Dúna Kristmundsdóttir	27 February 2008	Ref
115	Nepal	Gunnar Pálsson	30 April 2008	Ref
116	Laos	Gunnar Snorri Gunnarsson	6 May 2008	Ref
117	Maldives	Gunnar Pálsson	8 May 2008	Ref
118	Guyana	Hjálmar W. Hannesson	14 July 2008	Ref
119	Mauritius	Gunnar Pálsson	13 November 2008	Ref
120	San Marino	Þórir Ibsen	2 March 2012	Ref
