= List of ambassadors of Iceland =

List of ambassadors of Iceland may refer to:

- Ambassadors of Iceland
- List of ambassadors of Iceland to Austria
- List of ambassadors of Iceland to Belgium
- List of ambassadors of Iceland to Canada
- List of ambassadors of Iceland to China
- List of ambassadors of Iceland to Czechoslovakia
- List of ambassadors of Iceland to Denmark
- List of ambassadors of Iceland to East Germany
- List of ambassadors of Iceland to Finland
- List of ambassadors of Iceland to France
- List of ambassadors of Iceland to Germany
- List of ambassadors of Iceland to India
- List of ambassadors of Iceland to Japan
- List of ambassadors of Iceland to Norway
- List of ambassadors of Iceland to Russia
- List of ambassadors of Iceland to Sweden
- List of ambassadors of Iceland to the Soviet Union
- List of ambassadors of Iceland to the United Kingdom
- List of ambassadors of Iceland to the United States
- List of ambassadors of Iceland to Yugoslavia
