= List of ambassadors of Iceland to Finland =

Ambassador of Iceland to Finland
- Sendiherra Íslands í Finnlandi
- Incumbent; Árni Þór Sigurðsson since 1 January 2018
- Inaugural holder: Jakob Möller
- Formation: 29 December 1947

Iceland's first ambassador to Finland was Jakob Möller in 1947. Iceland's current ambassador to Finland is Harald Aspelund.

== List of ambassadors ==
#	Name	Appointment	Termination of mission
1	Jakob Möller	29 December 1947	17 January 1951
2	Helgi P. Briem	17 January 1951	1 July 1955
3	Magnús V. Magnússon	31 January 1956	1 June 1962
4	Hans G. Andersen	7 September 1962	1 July 1963
5	Árni Tryggvason	1 June 1964	1 October 1969
6	Haraldur Kröyer	1 January 1970	16 February 1973
7	Guðmundur Ívarsson Guðmundsson	16 February 1973	5 August 1977
8	Ingvi S. Ingvarsson	5 August 1977	24 September 1982
9	Benedikt Sigurðsson Gröndal	24 September 1982	30 October 1987
10	Þórður Einarsson	30 October 1987	8 March 1991
11	Sigríður Ásdís Snævarr	8 March 1991	8 March 1996
12	Hörður H. Bjarnason	8 March 1996	8 April 1999
13	Kornelíus Sigmundsson	8 April 1999	30 January 2003
14	Jón Baldvin Hannibalsson	30 January 2003	24 November 2005
15	Hannes Heimsson	24 November 2005	12 November 2009
16	Elín Flygenring	12 November 2009	19 September 2013
17	Kristín A. Árnadóttir	19 September 2013	31 December 2017
18	Árni Þór Sigurðsson	1 January 2018	31 May 2020
18	Auðunn Atlason	1 June 2020	
19	Harald Aspelund		Incumbent

== See also ==
- Finland–Iceland relations
- Foreign relations of Iceland
- Ambassadors of Iceland
