= List of ambassadors of Iceland to Canada =

Ambassador of Iceland to Canada
- Sendiherra Íslands í Kanada
- Incumbent; Hlynur Guðjónsson since 9 September 2021
- Inaugural holder: Thor Thors
- Formation: 19 September 1947

Iceland's first ambassador to Canada was Thor Thors in 1947. Iceland's current ambassador to Canada is Hlynur Guðjónsson.

== List of ambassadors ==
#	Name	Appointment	Termination of mission
1	Thor Thors	19 September 1947	11 January 1965
2	Pétur Thorsteinsson	4 August 1965	30 September 1969
3	Magnús V. Magnússon	1 October 1969	4 April 1971
4	Guðmundur Í. Guðmundsson	1 August 1971	9 April 1973
5	Haraldur Kröyer	9 April 1973	6 October 1976
6	Hans G. Andersen	6 October 1976	28 April 1987
7	Ingvi S. Ingvarsson	28 April 1987	24 January 1991
8	Tómas Á. Tómasson	24 January 1991	20 January 1994
9	Einar Benediktsson	20 January 1994	21 November 1997
10	Jón Baldvin Hannibalsson	10 June 1998	9 April 2001
11	Hjálmar W. Hannesson	9 April 2001	17 September 2003
12	Guðmundur Eiríksson	17 September 2003	14 November 2005
13	Markús Örn Antonsson	14 November 2005	15 September 2008
14	Sigríður Anna Þórðardóttir	15 September 2008	8 March 2012
15	Þórður Ægir Óskarsson	8 March 2012	9 March 2014
16	Sturla Sigurjónsson	9 March 2014	20 November 2017
17	Pétur Ásgeirsson	20 November 2017	9 September 2021
18	Hlynur Guðjónsson	9 September 2021	Incumbent

== Missions ==
- Embassy of Iceland, Ottawa

== See also ==
- Canada–Iceland relations
- Foreign relations of Iceland
- Ambassadors of Iceland
