= List of ambassadors of Iceland to the United Kingdom =

Ambassador of Iceland to the United Kingdom
- Sendiherra Íslands á Bretlandi
- Incumbent; Sturla Sigurjónsson since 16 November 2020
- Inaugural holder: Pétur Benediktsson
- Formation: 13 December 1941

Iceland's first ambassador to the United Kingdom was Pétur Benediktsson in 1941. Iceland's current ambassador to the United Kingdom is Sturla Sigurjónsson.

== List of ambassadors ==
#	Name	Appointment	Termination of mission
1	Pétur Benediktsson	13 December 1941	31 January 1944
2	Stefán Þorvarðsson	31 January 1944	30 December 1950
3	Agnar Klemens Jónsson	25 January 1951	11 June 1956
4	Kristinn Guðmundsson	27 September 1956	1 January 1961
5	Henrik Sveinsson Björnsson	1 January 1961	4 August 1965
6	Guðmundur Ívarsson Guðmundsson	21 September 1965	1 August 1971
7	Niels P. Sigurðsson	1 August 1971	19 February 1976
8	Sigurður Bjarnason	1 July 1976	11 November 1982
9	Einar Benediktsson	11 November 1982	28 November 1986
10	Ólafur Egilsson	28 November 1986	13 December 1989
11	Helgi Ágústsson	13 December 1989	3 May 1995
12	Benedikt Ásgeirsson	3 May 1995	16 July 1999
13	Þorsteinn Pálsson	16 July 1999	27 February 2003
14	Sverrir Haukur Gunnlaugsson	27 February 2003	9 February 2010
15	Benedikt Jónsson	9 February 2010	August 2014
16	Þórður Ægir Óskarsson	August 2014	14 November 2017
17	Stefán Haukur Jóhannesson	14 November 2017	16 November 2020
18	Sturla Sigurjónsson	16 November 2020	Incumbent

== See also ==
- Iceland–United Kingdom relations
- Foreign relations of Iceland
- Ambassadors of Iceland
