= List of ambassadors of Iceland to the United States =

Icelandic Ambassador to the United States
- Sendiherra Íslands í Bandaríkjunum
- Coat of arms of Iceland
- Incumbent; Svanhildur Hólm Valsdóttir since 18 September 2024
- Ministry for Foreign Affairs; Embassy of Iceland in Washington D.C
- Style: Her Excellency
- Reports to: Minister for Foreign Affairs
- Appointer: President of Iceland
- Inaugural holder: Thor Thors
- Formation: 23 October 1941
- Website: Embassy of Iceland in Washington D.C.

Iceland first established a permanent representation to the United States in October 1940, following Thor Thors appointment as ambassador. Prior to 1940, Iceland was represented in the United States by Denmark.

== List of ambassadors ==
#	Name	Appointment	Termination of mission
1	Thor Thors	23 October 1941	11 January 1965
2	Pétur Thorsteinsson	1 August 1965	1 October 1969
3	Magnús V. Magnússon	1 October 1969	4 April 1971
4	Guðmundur Ívarsson Guðmundsson	1 August 1971	2 March 1973
5	Haraldur Kröyer	2 March 1973	21 July 1976
6	Hans Georg Andersen	21 July 1976	24 November 1986
7	Ingvi S. Ingvarsson	24 November 1986	17 December 1990
8	Tómas Á. Tómasson	17 December 1990	9 December 1993
9	Einar Benediktsson	9 December 1993	21 November 1997
10	Jón Baldvin Hannibalsson	16 March 1998	9 December 2002
11	Helgi Ágústsson	9 December 2002	8 December 2006
12	Albert Jónsson	8 December 2006	8 January 2009
13	Hjálmar W. Hannesson	8 January 2009	1 October 2011
14	Guðmundur Árni Stefánsson	1 October 2011	23 February 2015
15	Geir Haarde	23 February 2015	1 July 2019
16	Bergdís Ellertsdóttir	1 July 2019	18 September 2024
17	Svanhildur Hólm Valsdóttir [is]	18 September 2024	Incumbent

== See also ==
- Iceland–United States relations
- Foreign relations of Iceland
- Ambassadors of Iceland
