= List of ambassadors of Iceland to Belgium =

Ambassador of Iceland to Belgium
- Sendiherra Íslands í Belgium
- Incumbent; Stefán Haukur Jóhannesson since 24 September 2025
- Inaugural holder: Pétur Benediktsson
- Formation: 13 February 1946

Iceland's first ambassador to Belgium was Pétur Benediktsson in 1946. Iceland's current ambassador to Belgium is Stefán Haukur Jóhannesson.

== List of ambassadors ==
#	Name	Appointment	Termination of mission
1	Pétur Benediktsson	13 February 1946	30 November 1955
2	Agnar Klemens Jónsson	10 December 1956	1 January 1961
3	Hans Georg Andersen	1 January 1961	1 June 1962
4	Pétur Thorsteinsson	1 June 1962	4 August 1965
5	Henrik Sveinsson Björnsson	4 August 1965	24 January 1968
6	Niels P. Sigurðsson	24 January 1968	1 August 1971
7	Tómas Á. Tómassson	1 August 1971	20 July 1977
8	Guðmundur Ívarsson Guðmundsson	20 July 1977	8 May 1979
9	Henrik Sveinsson Björnsson	8 May 1979	14 November 1984
10	Tómas Á. Tómasson	14 November 1984	5 December 1986
11	Einar Benediktsson	5 December 1986	30 April 1991
12	Hannes Þórður Hafstein	30 April 1991	12 March 1997
13	Gunnar Snorri Gunnarsson	12 March 1997	15 January 2003
14	Kjartan Jóhannsson	15 January 2003	8 February 2006
15	Stefán H. Jóhannesson	8 February 2006	12 April 2011
16	Þórir Ibsen	12 April 2011	1 September 2014
17	Bergdís Ellertsdóttir	1 September 2014	1 August 2018
17	Gunnar Pálsson	1 August 2018	1 August 2020
17	Kristján Andri Stefánsson	1 August 2020	September 2025
18	Stefán Haukur Jóhannesson	September 2025	Incumbent

== See also ==
- Foreign relations of Iceland
- Ambassadors of Iceland
