= Helgi Ágústsson =

Icelandic diplomat

Ambassador of Iceland to the United Kingdom
- In office May 3, 1995 – July 16, 1999
- Preceded by: Ólafur Egilsson
- Succeeded by: Benedikt Ásgeirsson

Ambassador of Iceland to Denmark
- In office April 15, 1999 – March 24, 2003
- Preceded by: Róbert Trausti Árnason
- Succeeded by: Þorsteinn Pálsson

Ambassador of Iceland to the United States
- In office December 9, 2002 – December 8, 2006
- Preceded by: Jón Baldvin Hannibalsson
- Succeeded by: Albert Jónsson

8th Chairman of KKÍ
- In office 1982–1983
- Preceded by: Kristbjörn Albertsson
- Succeeded by: Þórdís Anna Kristjánsdóttir

Personal details
- Born: October 16, 1941 (age 84) Reykjavík, Iceland
- Spouse: Hervör Jónasdóttir
- Children: 4

Helgi Ágústsson (born 16 October 1941) is an Icelandic former diplomat. He was the Ambassador of Iceland to the United Kingdom from 1989 to 1995, the Ambassador of Iceland to Denmark from 1999 to 2002, and the Ambassador of Iceland to the United States from 2002 to 2006. During the Cod Wars in the 1970s, he worked for the Icelandic Ministry for Foreign Affairs in London.

== Basketball ==
Helgi played basketball for KR in the top-tier Icelandic basketball league and was the chairman of the club from 1966 to 1970 and 1977 to 1979. In 1982 he was elected as the chairman of the Icelandic Basketball Association where he served until 1983.

== Personal life ==
Helgi is married to Hervör Jónasdóttir and together they have four children. Their granddaughter is Katrín Davíðsdóttir, the women's champion of the 2015 and 2016 CrossFit Games.
