= List of ambassadors of Iceland to India =

Guðni Bragson

Iceland Ambassador to India
- Incumbent
- Assumed office September 2021
- President: Guðni Th. Jóhannesson
- Preceded by: Guðmundur Árni Stefánsson

Iceland's first ambassador to India was Pétur Thorsteinsson in 1976. Iceland's present ambassador to India is Guðni Bragson, who presented his credentials to President Ram Nath Kovind on 22 September 2021. While Iceland has an acreditted ambassador since 1976, the Embassy of Iceland was not formally opened until 26 February, 2006. Aside from India, the Embassy's area of jurisdiction includes Nepal and Sri Lanka.

== List of ambassadors ==
#	Name	Appointment	Termination of mission
1	Pétur Thorsteinsson	20 November 1976	9 February 1984
2	Sigurður Bjarnason	9 February 1984	31 December 1985
3	Hannes Jónsson	6 October 1987	31 October 1989
4	Benedikt Ásgeirsson	5 February 1997	11 February 2000
5	Þorsteinn Pálsson	11 February 2000	23 February 2004
6	Sverrir H. Gunnlaugsson	23 February 2004	5 April 2006
7	Sturla Sigurjónsson	5 April 2006	18 January 2007
8	Gunnar Pálsson	18 January 2007	11 November 2009
9	Guðmundur Eiríksson	11 November 2009	September 2018
10	Guðmundur Árni Stefánsson	September 2018	April 2020
11	Guðni Bragson	September 2021	Incumbent

== See also ==
- Iceland–India relations
- Foreign relations of Iceland
- Ambassadors of Iceland
- List of ambassadors and high commissioners to India
