= List of ambassadors of Iceland to Russia =

Ambassador of Iceland to Russia
- Sendiherra Íslands í Rússlandi
- Incumbent; Árni Þór Sigurðsson since 1 June 2020
- Inaugural holder: Ólafur Egilsson
- Formation: 8 December 1991

Iceland's first ambassador to Russia was Ólafur Egilsson in 1991; its current is Árni Þór Sigurðsson.

| # | Name | Appointment | Termination of mission |
|---|---|---|---|
| 1 | Ólafur Egilsson | 8 December 1991 | 20 May 1994 |
| 2 | Gunnar Gunnarsson | 20 May 1994 | 3 March 1998 |
| 3 | Jón Egill Egilsson | 3 March 1998 | 27 August 2001 |
| 4 | Benedikt Jónsson | 27 August 2001 | 16 November 2006 |
| 5 | Benedikt Ásgeirsson | 16 November 2006 | 7 December 2011 |
| 6 | Albert Jónsson | 7 December 2011 | 31 August 2016 |
| 7 | Berglind Ásgeirsdóttir | 1 September 2016 | 31 May 2020 |
| 8 | Árni Þór Sigurðsson | 1 June 2020 | Incumbent |

== See also ==
- Iceland–Russia relations
- Foreign relations of Iceland
- Ambassadors of Iceland
- List of ambassadors of Russia to Iceland
