= List of ambassadors of Iceland to Denmark =

Ambassador of Iceland to Denmark
- Sendiherra Íslands í Danmörku
- Incumbent; Árni Þór Sigurðsson since 2023
- Inaugural holder: Sveinn Björnsson
- Formation: 16 August 1920

Iceland's first ambassador to Denmark was Sveinn Björnsson in 1920. Iceland's current ambassador to Denmark is Árni Þór Sigurðsson.

== List of ambassadors ==
#	Name	Credentials presented	Termination of mission
1	Sveinn Björnsson	16 August 1920	1 June 1924
—	Sveinn Björnsson	1 July 1926	17 June 1941
3	Jakob Möller	20 August 1945	30 December 1950
4	Stefán Þorvarðsson	30 December 1950	20 August 1951
5	Sigurður Nordal	12 October 1951	9 August 1957
6	Stefán Jóhann Stefánsson	9 August 1957	22 May 1965
7	Gunnar Thoroddsen	22 May 1965	1 January 1970
8	Sigurður Bjarnason	1 February 1970	12 February 1976
9	Agnar Klemens Jónsson	12 February 1976	17 January 1980
10	Einar Ágústsson	17 January 1980	12 April 1986
11	Hörður Helgason	29 May 1986	25 January 1991
12	Ingvi S. Ingvarsson	25 January 1991	9 March 1994
13	Ólafur Egilsson	9 March 1994	13 February 1996
14	Róbert Trausti Árnason	13 February 1996	15 April 1999
15	Helgi Ágústsson	15 April 1999	24 March 2003
16	Þorsteinn Pálsson	24 March 2003	22 November 2005
17	Svavar Gestsson	22 November 2005	15 February 2010
18	Sturla Sigurjónsson	15 February 2010	17 October 2014
19	Benedikt Jónsson	17 October 2014	2019
20	Helga Hauksdóttir	27 September 2019	2023
21	Árni Þór Sigurðsson	22 September 2023	incumbent

== See also ==
- Denmark–Iceland relations
- Foreign relations of Iceland
- Ambassadors of Iceland
