= List of ambassadors of Iceland to Sweden =

Ambassador of Iceland to Sweden
- Sendiherra Íslands í Svíþjóð
- Incumbent; Hannes Heimisson since 1 August 2020
- Inaugural holder: Helgi P. Briem
- Formation: 28 December 1950

Iceland's first ambassador to Sweden was Helgi P. Briem in 1950. Iceland's current ambassador to Sweden is Hannes Heimisson.

== List of ambassadors ==
#	Name	Appointment	Termination of mission
1	Helgi P. Briem	28 December 1950	1 July 1955
2	Magnús V. Magnússon	18 January 1956	1 June 1962
3	Hans Georg Andersen	1 June 1962	1 July 1963
4	Árni Tryggvason	1 June 1964	30 September 1969
5	Haraldur Kröyer	1 January 1970	27 February 1973
6	Guðmundur Ívarsson Guðmundsson	27 February 1973	8 September 1977
7	Ingvi Sigurður Ingvarsson	8 September 1977	2 September 1982
8	Benedikt Sigurðsson Gröndal	2 September 1982	15 October 1987
9	Þórður Einarsson	15 October 1987	22 February 1991
10	Sigríður Á. Snævarr	22 February 1991	15 February 1996
11	Hörður H. Bjarnason	15 February 1996	30 August 2001
12	Svavar Gestsson	30 August 2001	30 November 2005
13	Guðmundur Árni Stefánsson	30 November 2005	28 October 2011
14	Gunnar Gunnarsson	28 October 2011	
15	Estrid Brekkan	September 23, 2015	31 July 2020
15	Hannes Heimisson	1 August 2020	Incumbent

== See also ==
- Iceland–Sweden relations
- Foreign relations of Iceland
- Ambassadors of Iceland
