= List of ambassadors of Iceland to China =

Icelandic Ambassador to China
- Sendiherra Íslands í Kína
- Coat of arms of Iceland
- Incumbent; Thórir Ibsen since 2021
- Ministry for Foreign Affairs; Embassy of Iceland in Beijing
- Style: His Excellency
- Appointer: President of Iceland
- Inaugural holder: Sigurður Bjarnason
- Formation: 25 September 1973
- Website: Embassy of Iceland in Beijing

Iceland's first ambassador to China was Sigurður Bjarnason in 1973. Iceland's current ambassador to China is Thórir Ibsen.

== List of ambassadors ==
#	Name	Appointment	Termination of mission
1	Sigurður Bjarnason	25 September 1973	20 September 1976
2	Pétur Thorsteinsson	20 September 1976	24 February 1988
3	Benedikt Sigurðsson Gröndal	24 February 1988	12 April 1991
4	Ingvi S. Ingvarsson	12 April 1991	21 January 1995
5	Hjálmar W. Hannesson	21 January 1995	26 March 1998
6	Ólafur Egilsson	26 March 1998	27 January 2003
7	Eiður Svanberg Guðnason	27 January 2003	14 November 2006
8	Gunnar Snorri Gunnarsson	14 November 2006	11 January 2010
9	Kristín A. Árnadóttir	11 January 2010	11 October 2013
10	Stefán Skjaldarson	11 October 2013	23 March 2018
-	Gunnar Snorri Gunnarsson	23 March 2018	7 September 2021
12	Thórir Ibsen	7 September 2021	Incumbent

== See also ==
- China–Iceland relations
- Foreign relations of Iceland
- Ambassadors of Iceland
