= Thordur Einarsson =

Thordur Einarsson Þórður Einarsson

Chief of Protocol in the Ministry for Foreign Affairs (Iceland)
- In office 1978–1985
- Succeeded by: Gunnar Pálsson

Ambassador of Iceland to Sweden of Iceland to Sweden
- In office October 15, 1987 – February 22, 1991
- Preceded by: Benedikt Sigurðsson Gröndal
- Succeeded by: Sigríður Ásdís Snævarr

Personal details
- Born: June 19, 1923 Reykjavík
- Died: May 12, 1997 (aged 73) Reykjavík
- Education: 1941: finished in commerce from the Cooperative School; 1944 degree from the City of London College.; 1945 certified translator and court interpreter in English

Thordur Einarsson (June 19, 1923 – May 12, 1987) was an Icelandic ambassador.

== Career ==
- From 1944 to 1950 he was employed from "Eggert Kristjánsson Ltd" and a Bridge Construction Company.
- From 1951 to 1963 he was employed as a representative of the US embassy.
- From 1964 to 1968 he was employed by the Ministry of Education.
- In 1972 he entered the foreign service and represented Iceland at the Council of Europe in Strasbourg.
- From 1973 to 1977 he was spokesperson of the foreign ministry.
- From 1978 to 1985 he was Chief of Protocol.
- In 1986 he was Minister Counsellor Deputy Permanent Representative to the United Nations.
- From October 15, 1987 to February 22, 1991 he was ambassador in Stockholm, from 30 October 1987 to 8 March 1991 concurrently accredited in Helsinki and from 4 February 1988 to 1 February 1991 concurrently accredited in Belgrade and Tirana.
