= Ingvi Sigurður Ingvarsson =

Icelandic diplomat

Permanent Representative of Iceland to the United Nations
- In office 1972 – September 8, 1977
- Preceded by: Haraldur Kröyer
- Succeeded by: Tómas Ármann Tómasson

Ambassador of Iceland to Sweden
- In office September 8, 1977 – September 2, 1982
- Preceded by: Guðmundur Ívarsson Guðmundsson
- Succeeded by: Benedikt Sigurðsson Gröndal

Ambassador of Iceland to the United States
- In office November 24, 1986 – December 17, 1990
- Preceded by: Hans Georg Andersen
- Succeeded by: Tómas Ármann Tómasson

Ambassador of Iceland to China
- In office April 12, 1991 – January 21, 1995
- Preceded by: Benedikt Sigurðsson Gröndal
- Succeeded by: Hjálmar Waag Hannesson

Personal details
- Born: 12 December 1924 Reykjavík, Iceland
- Died: 26 September 2009 (aged 84) Reykjavík, Iceland
- Spouse: Ingvar Hólmfríður Guðlaug Jónsdóttir
- Children: Bergljót Kristin educationalist and teacher
- Parents: Ingvar Ingvarsson farmer (father); Gudrun Jónasdóttir (mother)
- Education: 1945 graduated from Akureyri College; University of Iceland 1949 University of Glasgow: 1949-1950: Master of Arts. London School of Economics, Post Graduate Study.

Ingvi Sigurður Ingvarsson (12 December 1924 – 26 September 2009) was an Icelandic diplomat.

== Life and career ==
Ingvi worked for the tax office and the Embassy of the United States in Reykjavík. In 1956 he entered diplomatic service. From 1958 to 1962 he was first secretary in Moscow (Soviet Union). From 1962 to 1966 he was Counselor (diplomat) in Washington, D.C. (United States). From 1966 to 1971 he was Deputy Permanent Representative of Iceland to North Atlantic Council in Brussels and Counsellor of the embassy in Paris and Brussels. From 1971 to 1972 he was Deputy Secretary General of the Ministry for Foreign Affairs (Iceland) in Reykjavík. From 1972 to 1976 he was Permanent Representative next the Headquarters of the United Nations in New York City.

From 8 September 1977 to 2 September 1982 he was ambassador to Stockholm. From 5 August 1977 to 24 September 1982 he was coaccreditated in Helsinki and from 9 November 1977 to 21 March 1983 he was coaccreditated to Belgrade. From 24 November 1986 to 17 December 1990 he was ambassador in Washington, D. C. From 28 April 1987 to 24 January 1991 he was coaccreditated in Ottawa.

From 12 April 1991 to 21 January 1995 he was ambassador in Beijing, From 25 January 1991 to 9 March 1994 he was coaccreditated in Copenhagen. From 17 November 1992 to 6 October 1994 he was coaccreditated as ambassador to Ankara. From 1982 to 1986 he was Secretary of State. He was chairman of the United Nations University. He was awarded the Order of the Falcon with a star.
