= List of ambassadors of Iceland to Austria =

Icelandic Ambassador to Austria
- Sendiherra Íslands í Austurríki
- Coat of arms of Iceland
- Incumbent; Auðunn Atlason since 17 September 2013
- Ministry for Foreign Affairs; Embassy of Iceland in Vienna
- Style: Her Excellency
- Reports to: Minister for Foreign Affairs
- Appointer: President of Iceland
- Inaugural holder: Árni Tryggvason
- Formation: 19 July 1965
- Website: Embassy of Iceland in Vienna

Iceland's first ambassador to Austria was Árni Tryggvason in 1965. Iceland's current ambassador to Austria is Auðunn Atlason.

== List of ambassadors ==
#	Name	Appointment	Termination of mission
1	Árni Tryggvason	19 July 1965	1 October 1969
2	Haraldur Kröyer	1 April 1970	29 November 1973
3	Guðmundur Ívarsson Guðmundsson	29 November 1973	26 November 1976
4	Niels P. Sigurðsson	26 November 1976	20 April 1979
5	Pétur Eggerz	20 April 1979	28 October 1983
6	Hannes Jónsson	28 October 1983	11 March 1987
7	Páll Ásgeir Tryggvason	11 March 1987	12 October 1989
8	Hjálmar W. Hannesson	12 October 1989	12 September 1995
9	Ingimundur Sigfússon	12 September 1995	7 May 2001
10	Þórður Ægir Óskarsson	7 May 2001	9 September 2004
11	Sveinn Björnsson	9 September 2004	14 October 2009
12	Stefán Skjaldarson	14 October 2009	17 September 2013
13	Auðunn Atlason	17 September 2013	Incumbent

== See also ==
- Foreign relations of Iceland
- Ambassadors of Iceland
