= Sigurður Bjarnason (politician) =

Icelandic politician and diplomat

Sigurður Bjarnason (18 December 1915 – 5 January 2012) was an Icelandic politician and diplomat.

He was born and grew up in Vigur in Ögur Parish in Norður-Ísafjarðarsýsla, Iceland. He was the eldest of the six children of Björg Björnsdóttir (7 July 1889 – 24 January 1977) and Bjarni Sigurðsson (24 July 1889 – 30 July 1974). He graduated from high school in 1935 and read law at the University of Iceland, graduating in 1941. He then pursued postgraduate studies at the University of Cambridge, England. He worked for the newspaper Morgunblaðið as reporter, then political editor and finally editor from 1956 to 1970.

He served as speaker of the Lower House of the Althing 1949 to 1956 and again from 1963 to 1970. He was later the Icelandic ambassador to Denmark (1970–1976), Turkey (1970–1976), Ireland (1970–1983), China (1973–1976), the United Kingdom (1976–1982), the Netherlands (1976–1982), Nigeria (1976–1982), Cyprus (1983–1985), and India (1984–1985). Sigurður served as the President of the Nordic Council from 1965 to 1966. He sat on the United Nations General Assembly from 1960 to 1962.

He married sculptor Ólöf Pálsdóttir (14 April 1920 – 21 February 2018) on 5 February 1956; they had two children, Hildur Helga and Ólafur Páll.
