= Ingibjörg Davíðsdóttir =

Icelandic diplomat and politician

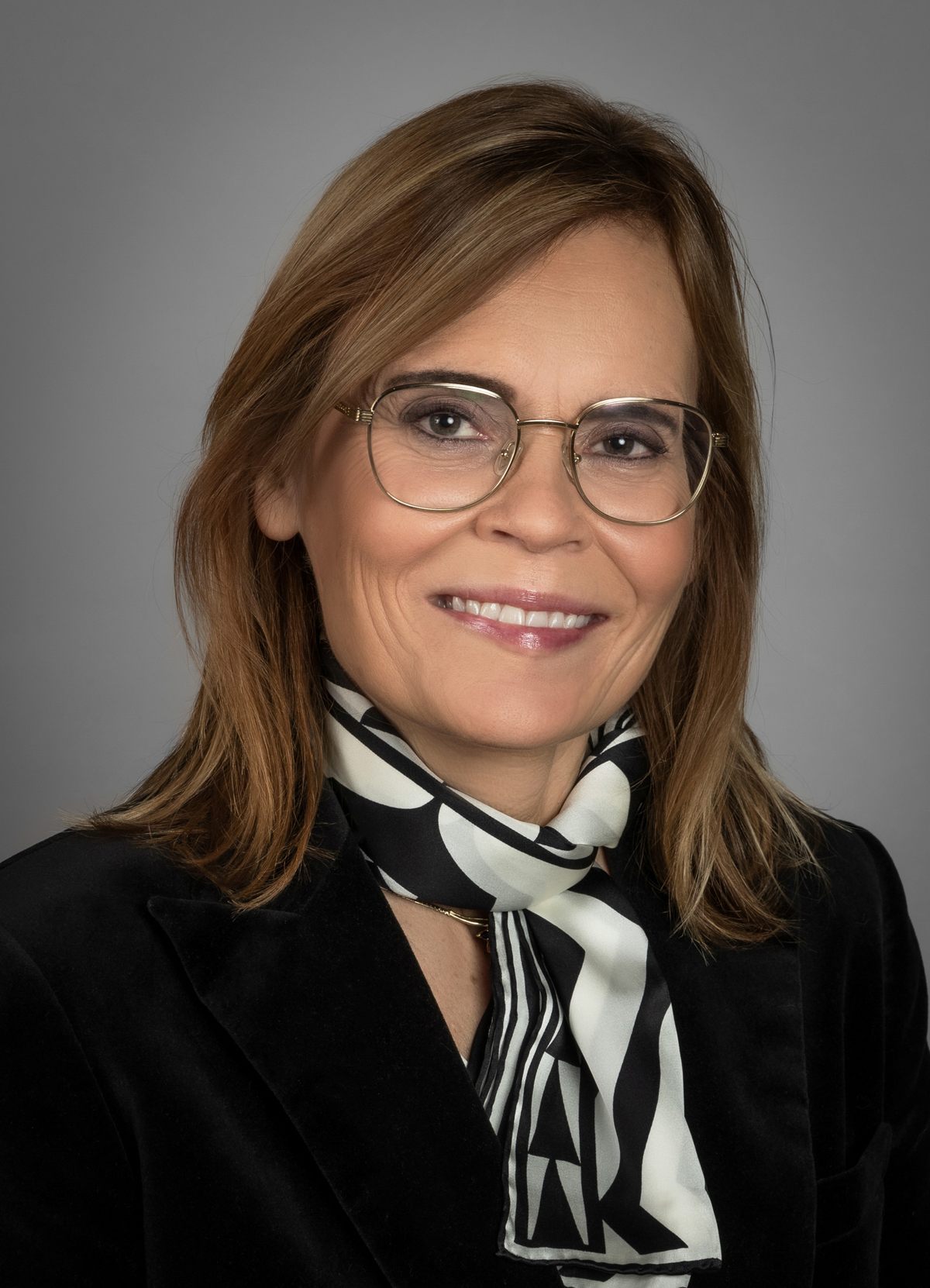

Member of the Althing
- Incumbent
- Assumed office 2024
- Constituency: Northwest

Personal details
- Born: 8 December 1970 (age 55)
- Party: Centre Party

Ingibjörg Davíðsdóttir (born 8 December 1970) is an Icelandic diplomat and politician from the Centre Party. In the 2024 Icelandic parliamentary election she was elected to the Althing.

From 2015 to 2018, she was Advisor to the Prime Minister on Foreign Affairs working with Sigmundur Davíð, Sigurður Ingi, Bjarni Benediktsson and Katrín Jakobsdóttir.

She was Iceland's Ambassador to Norway from 2019 to 2024.

== See also ==
- List of members of the Althing, 2024–2028
