= List of ambassadors of Iceland to France =

Ambassador of Iceland to France
- Sendiherra Íslands í Frakklandi
- Incumbent; Unnur Orradóttir Ramette since August 2020
- Inaugural holder: Pétur Benediktsson
- Formation: 10 January 1946

Iceland's first ambassador to France was Pétur Benediktsson in 1946. The current Ambassador is Unnur Orradóttir Ramette, who assumed office in July 2020, succeeding Kristján Andri Stefánsson, who had served since 2016.

== List of ambassadors ==
#	Name	Appointment	Termination of mission
1	Pétur Benediktsson	10 January 1946	30 November 1955
2	Agnar Klemens Jónsson	11 July 1956	1 January 1961
3	Hans G. Andersen	1 January 1961	1 June 1962
4	Pétur Thorsteinsson	1 June 1962	4 August 1965
5	Henrik Sveinsson Björnsson	4 August 1965	28 April 1976
6	Einar Benediktsson	28 April 1976	9 November 1982
7	Tómas Á. Tómasson	9 November 1982	13 February 1985
8	Haraldur Kröyer	13 February 1985	9 June 1989
9	Albert Sigurður Guðmundsson	9 June 1989	31 March 1993
10	Sverrir Haukur Gunnlaugsson	26 May 1994	19 May 1999
11	Sigríður Ásdís Snævarr	19 May 1999	11 January 2005
12	Tómas Ingi Olrich	11 January 2005	15 January 2010
13	Þórir Ibsen	15 January 2010	March 2011
14	Berglind Ásgeirsdóttir	March 2011	August 2016
15	Kristján Andri Stefánsson	August 2016	August 2020
15	Unnur Orradóttir Ramette	August 2020	Incumbent

== See also ==
- France–Iceland relations
- Foreign relations of Iceland
- Ambassadors of Iceland
