= List of ambassadors to Iceland =

List of US ambassadors to Iceland

This is a list of current ambassadors to Iceland.

== Current ambassadors ==
| Sending country | Residence | Ambassador | Presentation of credentials | Ref |
|---|---|---|---|---|
| Afghanistan | Oslo, Norway | Najibullah Sherkhan (First Secretary) | 31 January 2025 | Ref |
| Albania | Stockholm, Sweden | Virgjil Kule | 7 May 2019 | Ref |
| Algeria | Stockholm, Sweden | vacant | | Ref |
| Andorra | Andorra la Vella, Andorra | Gil Rossell Duchamps | 25 February 2020 | Ref |
| Angola | Stockholm, Sweden | vacant | | Ref |
| Argentina | Oslo, Norway | Betina Alejandra Pasquali de Fonseca | 5 June 2018 | Ref |
| Armenia | Stockholm, Sweden | Alexander Arzoumanian | 4 February 2020 | Ref |
| Australia | Copenhagen, Denmark | Kerin Ann Burns Ayyalaraju | 8 December 2021 | Ref |
| Austria | Copenhagen, Denmark | Alice Irvin | 8 December 2021 | Ref |
| Azerbaijan | London, United Kingdom | Elin Emin Oglu Suleymanov | 31 May 2022 | Ref |
| Bahamas | Washington, D.C., United States | vacant | | Ref |
| Bahrain | London, United Kingdom | Shaikh Fawaz Al Khalifa | 7 February 2023 | Ref |
| Bangladesh | Copenhagen, Denmark | A.K.M. Shahidul Karim | 7 February 2023 | Ref |
| Barbados | Brussels, Belgium | vacant | | Ref |
| Belgium | Oslo, Norway | Jan Bayart | 17 October 2023 | Ref |
| Benin | Paris, France | Eusèbe Agbangla (Ambassador Agrée) | 2021 | Ref |
| Bosnia and Herzegovina | Oslo, Norway | Bakir Sadović | 18 April 2023 | Ref |
| Botswana | Stockholm, Sweden | Chandapiwa Ntete (Ambassador Agrée) | 2022 | Ref |
| Brazil | Oslo, Norway | Enio Cordeiro | 3 November 2021 | Ref |
| Brunei | London, United Kingdom | Pengiran Dato Seri Pahlawan Norazmi Bin Haji Muhammad | 7 February 2023 | Ref |
| Bulgaria | Oslo, Norway | Dessislava Ivanova-Kozleva | 17 October 2023 | Ref |
| Burkina Faso | Copenhagen, Denmark | vacant | | Ref |
| Burundi | Berlin, Germany | Annonciata Sendazirasa | 2025 | Ref |
| Canada | Reykjavík, Iceland | Jeannette Menzies | 25 February 2021 | Ref |
| Cape Verde | Berlin, Germany | vacant | | Ref |
| Chile | Oslo, Norway | Luis Andrés Plaza Gentina | 10 November 2021 | Ref |
| China | Reykjavík, Iceland | He Rulong | 16 March 2022 | Ref |
| Colombia | Stockholm, Sweden | vacant | | Ref |
| Costa Rica | London, United Kingdom | vacant | | Ref |
| Croatia | Copenhagen, Denmark | Tina Krce | 17 September 2019 | Ref |
| Cuba | Stockholm, Sweden | Alba Beatríz Soto Pimentel | 31 August 2021 | Ref |
| Cyprus | Copenhagen, Denmark | vacant | | Ref |
| Czech Republic | Oslo, Norway | David Červenka | 31 January 2023 | Ref |
| Denmark | Reykjavík, Iceland | Kirsten Geelan | 1 September 2021 | Ref |
| Djibouti | Paris, France | Ayeid Mousseid Yahya | 31 May 2022 | Ref |
| Dominican Republic | New York City, US | José Alfonso Blanco Conde | 27 April 2022 | Ref |
| Ecuador | Stockholm, Sweden | Verónica Bustamante | 18 April 2023 | Ref |
| Egypt | Oslo, Norway | Dr. Gamal Abdelrehim Mohamed Metwally | 30 January 2024 | Ref |
| El Salvador | Stockholm, Sweden | Patricia Nathaly Godínes Aguillón | 1 March 2022 | Ref |
| Estonia | Oslo, Norway | Lauri Bambus | 8 June 2021 | Ref |
| Eswatini | London, United Kingdom | vacant | | Ref |
| European Union | Reykjavík, Iceland | Lucie Samcová-Hall Allen | 15 September 2020 | Ref |
| Finland | Reykjavík, Iceland | Anu Laamanen | 6 September 2022 | Ref |
| France | Reykjavík, Iceland | Guillaume Bazard | 3 October 2022 | Ref |
| Georgia | Copenhagen, Denmark | Natela Menabde | 27 April 2022 | Ref |
| Germany | Reykjavík, Iceland | Clarissa Duvigneau | 24 August 2023 | Ref |
| Ghana | Oslo, Norway | Jennifer Lartey | 3 November 2021 | Ref |
| Greece | Oslo, Norway | Anna Korka | 22 September 2021 | Ref |
| Guinea | London, United Kingdom | Mr Aly Diallo | 30 January 2024 | Ref |
| Guyana | London, United Kingdom | Frederick Hamley Case | 6 November 2018 | Ref |
| Holy See | Stockholm, Sweden | Julio Murat | 18 April 2023 | Ref |
| Honduras | Brussels, Belgium | vacant | | Ref |
| Hungary | Oslo, Norway | Eszter Sándorfi | 10 November 2021 | Ref |
| India | Reykjavík, Iceland | Shyam Balasubramanian | 17 August 2021 | Ref |
| Indonesia | Oslo, Norway | Teuku Faizasyah | 17 October 2023 | Ref |
| Iran | Oslo, Norway | Alireza Yousefi | 15 February 2022 | Ref |
| Ireland | Copenhagen, Denmark | Claire Buckley | 19 September 2023 | Ref |
| Israel | Oslo, Norway | Avraham Nir | 17 January 2023 | Ref |
| Italy | Oslo, Norway | Stefano Nicoletti | 17 January 2023 | Ref |
| Japan | Reykjavík, Iceland | Ryotaro Suzuki | 22 June 2021 | Ref |
| Jordan | London, United Kingdom | Manar Munther Dabbas | 7 February 2023 | Ref |
| Kazakhstan | London, United Kingdom | Magzhan Ilyassov | 19 September 2023 | Ref |
| Kenya | Stockholm, Sweden | Diana Wanjiku Kiambuthi (Ambassador Agrée) | 2022 | Ref |
| Korea | Oslo, Norway | Pil-woo Kim | 22 September 2021 | Ref |
| Kosovo | Stockholm, Sweden | Shkëndije Geci Sherifi | 13 September 2022 | Ref |
| Kuwait | Oslo, Norway | Raed Abdallah Alrifai | 31 January 2024 | Ref |
| Kyrgyzstan | London, United Kingdom | Edil J. Baisalov (Ambassador Agrée) | 2020 | Ref |
| Laos | London, United Kingdom | Douangmany Gnotsyoudom | 19 September 2023 | Ref |
| Latvia | Oslo, Norway | Mārtiņš Klīve | 31 May 2022 | Ref |
| Lebanon | Stockholm, Sweden | Hassan Saleh | 31 August 2021 | Ref |
| Lesotho | Dublin, Ireland | Sekhulumi Paul Ntsoaole | 28 January 2019 | Ref |
| Lithuania | Copenhagen, Denmark | Asta Radikaité | 31 May 2022 | Ref |
| Luxembourg | London, United Kingdom | Georges Friden | 21 February 2023 | Ref |
| Madagascar | Berlin, Germany | vacant | | Ref |
| Malawi | London, United Kingdom | Thomas John Bisika (Ambassador Agrée) | | Ref |
| Malaysia | Stockholm, Sweden | Hafizah Abdullah (Ambassador Agrée) | 2023 | Ref |
| Mali | Berlin, Germany | Oumou Sall Seck | 27 February 2019 | Ref |
| Malta | Valletta, Malta | PJesmond Cutajar | 8 December 2021 | Ref |
| Mauritania | Brussels, Belgium | Mohamed Mahmoud Brahim Khlil (Ambassador Agrée) | 2023 | Ref |
| Mexico | Copenhagen, Denmark | Norma Bertha Pensado Moreno | 17 January 2023 | Ref |
| Moldova | Stockholm, Sweden | Liliana Guţan | 18 April 2023 | Ref |
| Mongolia | Stockholm, Sweden | Tuvdendorj Janabazar | 13 September 2022 | Ref |
| Montenegro | London, United Kingdom | vacant | | Ref |
| Morocco | Oslo, Norway | Nabila Freidji | 15 November 2020 | Ref |
| Mozambique | Stockholm, Sweden | Florencio Joel Alberto Sele | 12 February 2019 | Ref |
| Namibia | Stockholm, Sweden | George Mbanga Liswaniso | 29 October 2019 | Ref |
| Nepal | London, United Kingdom | vacant | | Ref |
| Netherlands | Oslo, Norway | John Groffen | 22 September 2021 | Ref |
| New Zealand | Stockholm, Sweden | David Leslie Taylor | 17 October 2023 | Ref |
| Nicaragua | London, United Kingdom | Guisell Morales-Echaverry | 13 November 2018 | Ref |
| Niger | Brussels, Belgium | Mousse Dourfaye | 15 November 2022 | Ref |
| Nigeria | Dublin, Ireland | Obiezu Ijeoma Chinonyerem | 15 February 2022 | Ref |
| North Korea | Stockholm, Sweden | Won Guk Ri | 31 August 2021 | Ref |
| North Macedonia | Oslo, Norway | Driton Kuqi | 18 April 2023 | Ref |
| Norway | Reykjavík, Iceland | Cecilie Annette Willoch | 17 September 2023 | Ref |
| Oman | Berlin, Germany | Bader Mohammed Bader Al Mantheri (Ambassador Agrée) | 2022 | Ref |
| Pakistan | Oslo, Norway | Saadia Altaf Qazi | 21 February 2023 | Ref |
| Palestine | Oslo, Norway | Marie Antoinette Sedin | 29 October 2019 | Ref |
| Panama | London, United Kingdom | Irma Natalia Royo de Hagerman | 13 September 2022 | Ref |
| Paraguay | London, United Kingdom | Genaro Vicente Pappalardo Ayala | 1 March 2022 | Ref |
| Peru | Oslo, Norway | Gustavo Laurie | 30 January 2024 | Ref |
| Philippines | Oslo, Norway | Enrico T. Fos | 27 April 2022 | Ref |
| Poland | Reykjavík, Iceland | Gerard Sławomir Pokruszyński | 23 January 2018 | Ref |
| Portugal | Oslo, Norway | Pedro Maria Santos Pessoa e Costa | 17 January 2023 | Ref |
| Qatar | London, United Kingdom | Fahad Mohammed Al-Attiyah | 7 February 2023 | Ref |
| Romania | Copenhagen, Denmark | Anton Niculescu | 21 February 2023 | Ref |
| Russia | Reykjavík, Iceland | vacant | | Ref |
| Rwanda | Stockholm, Sweden | Diane Gashumba | 15 November 2022 | Ref |
| San Marino | San Marino | Federica Bigi | 23 October 2018 | Ref |
| Saudi Arabia | Stockholm, Sweden | Enass Ahmad Alshahwan | 1 March 2022 | Ref |
| Senegal | London, United Kingdom | Fatimata Dia | 27 April 2022 | Ref |
| Serbia | Oslo, Norway | Dragan Petrović | 10 November 2021 | Ref |
| Singapore | London, United Kingdom | Ng Teck Hean (Ambassador Agrée) | 2023 | Ref |
| Slovakia | Oslo, Norway | Roman Bužek | 10 November 2021 | Ref |
| Slovenia | Copenhagen, Denmark | Mihael Zupančič | 17 January 2023 | Ref |
| South Africa | Oslo, Norway | Delores Camilla Katze | 17 January 2023 | Ref |
| South Sudan | Oslo, Norway | Mustafa Lowoh Walla Jabi | 18 April 2023 | Ref |
| Spain | Reykjavík, Iceland | José Ramón García Hernández | 22 September 2021 | Ref |
| Sri Lanka | Stockholm, Sweden | Dharshana Mahendra Perera | 31 January 2023 | Ref |
| Sudan | Oslo, Norway | vacant | | Ref |
| Swaziland | London, United Kingdom | vacant | | Ref |
| Sweden | Reykjavík, Iceland | Pär Ahlberger | 29 September 2020 | Ref |
| Switzerland | Oslo, Norway | Nathalie Marti | 17 October 2023 | Ref |
| Tanzania | Stockholm, Sweden | Grace Alfred Olotu (Ambassador Agrée) | 2022 | Ref |
| Thailand | Oslo, Norway | Vimolbajra Ruksakiati | 3 November 2021 | Ref |
| Tunisia | Oslo, Norway | Amel Ben Younes | 10 November 2021 | Ref |
| Turkey | Oslo, Norway | Gülin Dinç | 21 February 2023 | Ref |
| Uganda | Copenhagen, Denmark | Margaret Mutembeya Otteskov | 21 February 2023 | Ref |
| Ukraine | Helsinki, Finland | Olga Dibrova | 1 March 2022 | Ref |
| United Arab Emirates | London, United Kingdom | Mansoor Abdullah Khalfan Juma Abulhoul | 8 December 2021 | Ref |
| United Kingdom | Reykjavík, Iceland | Bryony Mathew | 24 August 2021 | Ref |
| United States | Reykjavík, Iceland | Carrin Patman | 6 October 2022 | Ref |
| Uruguay | Stockholm, Sweden | Federico Perazza | 31 January 2023 | Ref |
| Uzbekistan | London, United Kingdom | vacant | | Ref |
| Venezuela | Oslo, Norway | Ramón Antonio Gordils Montes | 19 September 2023 | Ref |
| Vietnam | Copenhagen, Denmark | Lung Tanh Nghi | 15 November 2022 | Ref |
| Zambia | Stockholm, Sweden | Gladys Neven Lundwe (Ambassador Agrée) | 2023 | Ref |

== See also ==
- Ambassadors of Iceland
