= List of ambassadors of Iceland to East Germany =

Ambassador of Iceland to East Germany
- Sendiherra Íslands í Austur-Þýskalandi
- Inaugural holder: Oddur Guðjónsson
- Formation: 18 December 1973
- Final holder: Hjálmar W. Hannesson
- Abolished: 3 October 1990
- Succession: Ambassador of Iceland to Germany

Iceland's first ambassador to East Germany was Oddur Guðjónsson in 1973. Iceland's last ambassador to East Germany was Hjálmar W. Hannesson in 1990.

== List of ambassadors ==
#	Name	Appointment	Termination of mission
1	Oddur Guðjónsson	18 December 1973	20 November 1974
2	Hannes Jónsson	20 November 1974	23 October 1980
3	Haraldur Kröyer	23 October 1980	29 April 1985
4	Páll Ásgeir Tryggvason	29 April 1985	4 March 1988
5	Tómas Á. Tómasson	4 March 1988	23 August 1990
6	Hjálmar W. Hannesson	23 August 1990	3 October 1990

== See also ==
- Germany–Iceland relations
- Foreign relations of Iceland
- Ambassadors of Iceland
