= Estrid Brekkan =

Icelandic diplomat

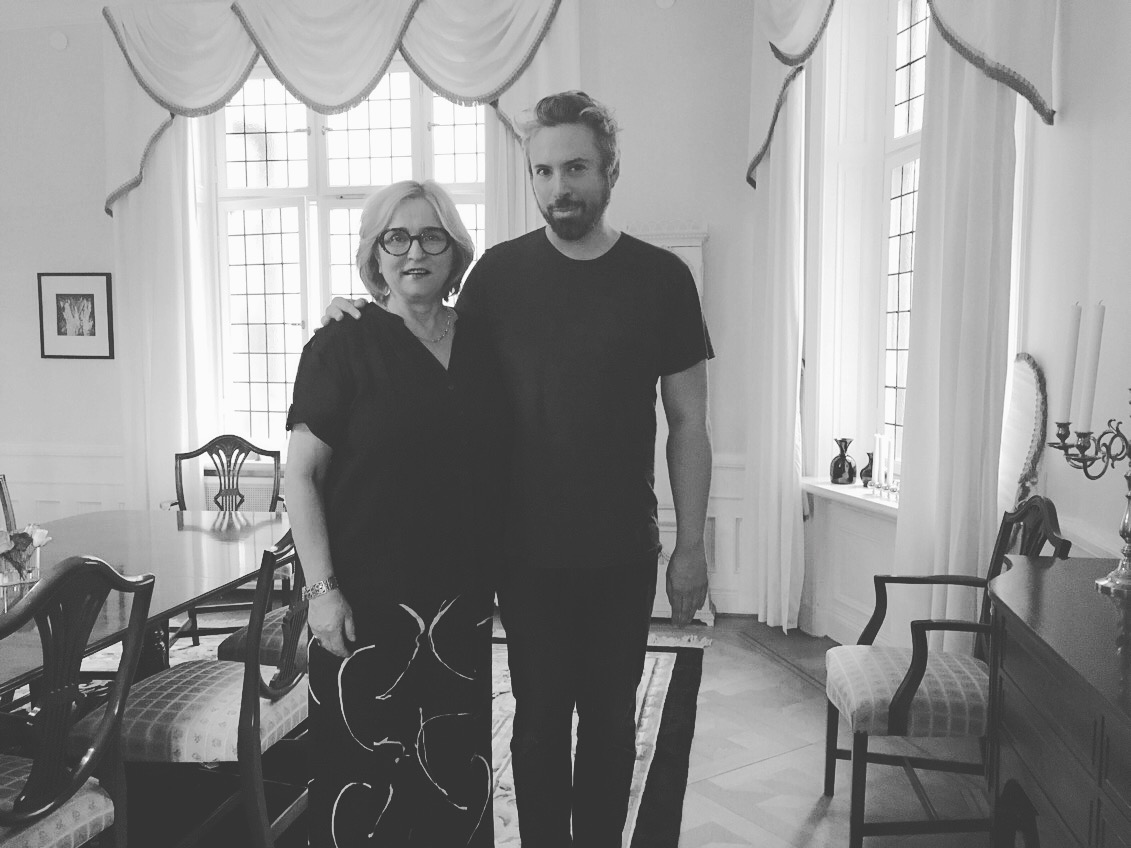
- Brekkan with filmmaker hypnotist Gurwann Tran Van Gie

Iceland Ambassador to Sweden
- In office 23 September 2015 – 31 July 2020
- Preceded by: Gunnar Gunnarsson
- Succeeded by: Hannes Heimisson

Estrid Brekkan (born 1954) is an Icelandic diplomat and the former Icelandic ambassador to Sweden, Albania and Kuwait.

== Career ==
In 1974, Estrid started working for the Ministry for Foreign Affairs. From 2002 to 2006, she was the Counsellor at the Embassy in Oslo. From 2008 to 2013, she served as Minister Counsellor at the Embassy in Paris and from 2013 until 2015 she was the Director of International Organisations and Human Rights at the Directorate for International and Security Affairs in the Ministry for Foreign Affairs, and Deputy Director General of the Directorate.

In 2015, she was appointed the Icelandic Ambassador to Sweden, Albania and Kuwait. She presented her credentials in Stockholm on 23 September 2015. She has encouraged sustainable investment in Iceland. Estrid was succeeded by Hannes Heimisson in 2020, and by 2021, she was Chief of Protocol of the Ministry for Foreign Affairs of Iceland.

== Personal life ==
Estrid is of Icelandic, Danish and Swedish descent. earned a degree in political science from University of Maryland University College.
