= List of ambassadors of Iceland to the Soviet Union =

Ambassador of Iceland to the Soviet Union
- Sendiherra Íslands í Sovétríkjunum
- Inaugural holder: Pétur Benediktsson
- Formation: 21 January 1944
- Final holder: Ólafur Egilsson
- Abolished: 8 December 1991
- Succession: Ambassador of Iceland to Russia

Iceland's first ambassador to the Soviet Union was Pétur Benediktsson in 1944. Iceland's last ambassador to the Soviet Union was Ólafur Egilsson in 1991.

== List of ambassadors ==
#	Name	Appointment	Termination of mission
1	Pétur Benediktsson	21 January 1944	30 January 1951
2	Helgi P. Briem	30 January 1951	11 September 1953
3	Pétur Thorsteinsson	11 September 1953	1 January 1961
4	Kristinn Guðmundsson	1 January 1961	31 December 1967
5	Oddur Guðjónsson	1 January 1968	8 October 1974
6	Hannes Jónsson	8 October 1974	18 July 1980
7	Haraldur Kröyer	18 July 1980	31 January 1985
8	Páll Ásgeir Tryggvason	31 January 1985	13 January 1987
9	Tómas Á. Tómasson	13 January 1987	17 January 1990
10	Ólafur Egilsson	17 January 1990	8 December 1991

== See also ==
- Iceland–Soviet Union relations
- Foreign relations of Iceland
- Ambassadors of Iceland
