= List of ambassadors of Iceland to Norway =

Ambassador of Iceland to Norway
- Sendiherra Íslands í Noregi
- Incumbent; Ingibjörg Davíðsdóttir since 1 August 2019
- Inaugural holder: Pétur Benediktsson
- Formation: 4 May 1942

Iceland's first ambassador to Norway was Pétur Benediktsson in 1942. Iceland's current ambassador to Norway is Ingibjörg Davíðsdóttir.

== List of ambassadors ==
| # | Name | Appointment | Termination of mission |
|---|---|---|---|
| 1 | Pétur Benediktsson | 4 May 1942 | 31 January 1944 |
| 2 | Stefán Þorvarðsson | 31 January 1944 | 30 June 1947 |
| 3 | Gísli Sveinsson | 1 July 1947 | 28 May 1951 |
| 4 | Bjarni Ásgeirsson | 28 May 1951 | 15 June 1956 |
| 5 | Haraldur Guðmundsson | 5 April 1957 | 1 July 1963 |
| 6 | Hans G. Andersen | 1 July 1963 | 31 August 1969 |
| 7 | Agnar Klemens Jónsson | 1 September 1969 | 2 March 1976 |
| 8 | Árni Tryggvason | 2 March 1976 | 15 May 1979 |
| 9 | Páll Ásgeir Tryggvason | 15 May 1979 | 17 January 1985 |
| 10 | Niels P. Sigurðsson | 17 January 1985 | 11 May 1989 |
| 11 | Haraldur Kröyer | 11 May 1989 | 7 March 1991 |
| 12 | Einar Benediktsson | 7 March 1991 | 16 September 1993 |
| 13 | Eiður Svanberg Guðnason | 16 September 1993 | 26 January 1999 |
| 14 | Kristinn F. Árnason | 26 January 1999 | 24 September 2003 |
| 15 | Stefán Skjaldarson | 24 September 2003 | 21 August 2008 |
| 16 | Sigríður Dúna Kristmundsdóttir | 21 August 2008 | 19 May 2011 |
| 17 | Gunnar Pálsson | 19 May 2011 | 31 July 2015 |
| 18 | Hermann Örn Ingólfsson | 1 August 2015 | 31 July 2019 |
| 19 | Ingibjörg Davíðsdóttir | 1 August 2019 | incumbent |

== See also ==
- Iceland–Norway relations
- Foreign relations of Iceland
- Ambassadors of Iceland
