= List of ambassadors of Iceland to Yugoslavia =

Ambassador of Iceland to Yugoslavia
- Sendiherra Íslands á Júgóslavíu
- Inaugural holder: Helgi P. Briem
- Formation: 29 April 1953
- Final holder: Þórður Einarsson
- Abolished: 1 February 1991

Iceland's first ambassador to Yugoslavia was Helgi P. Briem in 1953. Iceland's last ambassador to Yugoslavia was Þórður Einarsson in 1991.

== List of ambassadors ==
#	Name	Appointment	Termination of mission
1	Helgi Pálson Briem	29 April 1953	28 December 1960
2	Pétur Thorsteinsson	28 December 1960	3 December 1965
3	Henrik Sveinsson Björnsson	3 December 1965	6 September 1976
4	Guðmundur Ívarsson Guðmundsson	6 September 1976	9 November 1977
5	Ingvi Sigurður Ingvarsson	9 November 1977	21 March 1983
6	Benedikt Sigurðsson Gröndal	21 March 1983	4 February 1988
7	Thordur Einarsson	4 February 1988	1 February 1991

== See also ==
- Foreign relations of Iceland
- Ambassadors of Iceland
