= Hans Georg Andersen =

Icelandic diplomat

Ambassador of Iceland to Belgium
- In office January 1, 1961 – June 1, 1962
- Preceded by: Agnar Klemens Jónsson
- Succeeded by: Pétur Thorsteinsson

Ambassador of Iceland to Sweden
- In office June 1, 1962 – July 1, 1963
- Preceded by: Magnús Vignir Magnússon
- Succeeded by: Árni Tryggvason 1 July 1963 to 31 August 1969

Ambassador of Iceland to Norway
- In office July 1, 1963 – August 31, 1969
- Preceded by: Haraldur Guðmundsson
- Succeeded by: Agnar Klemens Jónsson

Ambassador of Iceland to United States
- In office July 21, 1976 – November 24, 1986
- Preceded by: Haraldur Kröyer
- Succeeded by: Ingvi S. Ingvarsson

Personal details
- Born: May 12, 1919 Winnipeg
- Died: April 25, 1994 (aged 74)
- Spouse: on Oct. 6, 1946 he married Astrid vr Helgadottir
- Children: Thora, Gunnar
- Parents: Franz Albert (father); Thora Gudmundsdottir (mother)
- Education: 1941: L.L. B. University of Iceland, 1945: L.L.M. Harvard Law School

Hans Georg Andersen (May 12, 1919 – April 25, 1994) was an Icelandic diplomat.

- From 1946 to 1954 he was legal adviser to the Ministry for Foreign Affairs (Iceland).
- In 1948 he was admitted to the bar.
- From 1954 to 1 June 1962 he was permanent Representative to the North Atlantic Council in Brussels with coacredition in Paris.
- From 1 June 1962 to 1 July 1963 he was Ambassador in Stockholm.
- On 7 September 1962 he was coaccreditated in Helsinki.
- From 1 July 1963 to 31 August 1969 he was Ambassador in Oslo with coaccredition in Prague.
- From 31 August 1969 to 21 July 1976 he was legal adviser in the Ministry for Foreign Affairs (Iceland).
- From 21 July 1976 to 24 November 1986 he was Ambassador in Washington, D.C.
- From 6 October 1976 to 28 April 1987 he was coaccreditated in Ottawa.
