= Helgi Pálson Briem =

Icelandic diplomat

Head of the mission of Iceland to Sweden
- In office 1950–1955
- Succeeded by: Magnús Vignir Magnússon

Ambassador of Iceland to Germany
- In office July 1, 1955 – January 1, 1961
- Preceded by: Vilhjálmur Finsen
- Succeeded by: Pétur Thorsteinsson

Personal details
- Born: June 18, 1902
- Died: August 2, 1981 (aged 79)
- Spouse: married in 1929, Doris Parker
- Children: daughter Alfheidur Sylvia
- Education: Ph.D. of the University of Iceland and Candidatus philologiæ Political Science of the University of Copenhagen

Helgi Pálson Briem (June 18, 1902 – August 2, 1981) was an Icelandic diplomat.

- In 1929 he was Director of Taxation.
- From 1930 to 1932 he was managing director of the Fishery Bank of Iceland.
- In 1932 he was Government Commercial Delegate.
- In 1935 he was Commercial Attaché in Madrid.
- In 1937 he was Commercial Attaché in Berlin.
- In 1940 he was Commercial Attaché in Lisbon.
- From 1942 to 1948 he had Exequatur as Consul-General for New York City.
- From 1948 to 1950 he was Chargé d'affaires in Stockholm.
- From December 28, 1950 to July 1, 1955 he was Ambassador in Stockholm with coacdredition 30 January 1951 to 11 September 1953 in Moscow 17 January 1951 to 1 July 1955 in Oslo and 29 April 1953 to 28 December 1960 in Belgrade.
- From July 1, 1955 to January 1, 1961 he was Ambassador in Bonn, on February 26, 1957 he was coaccreditated in Bern.
