= Svavar Gestsson =

Icelandic politician (1944–2021)

Icelandic Minister of Commerce
- In office September 1, 1978 – October 15, 1979
- Preceded by: Ólafur Jóhannesson
- Succeeded by: Kjartan Jóhannsson

Icelandic Minister of Social Affairs
- In office 8 February 1980 – April 28, 1983
- Preceded by: Magnús Helgi Magnússon
- Succeeded by: Alexander Stefánsson

Icelandic Minister of Education
- In office 28 September 1988 – 30 April 1991
- Preceded by: Birgir Ísleifur Gunnarsson
- Succeeded by: Ólafur Garðar Einarsson

Ambassador of Iceland to Sweden of Iceland to Sweden
- In office 30 August 2001 – 30 November 2005
- Preceded by: Hörður H. Bjarnason
- Succeeded by: Guðmundur Árni Stefánsson

Ambassador of Iceland to Denmark of Iceland to Denmark
- In office 22 November 2005 – 15 February 2012
- Preceded by: Þorsteinn Pálsson
- Succeeded by: Sturla Sigurjónsson

Personal details
- Born: 26 June 1944 Guðnabakki, Stafholtstungur, Iceland
- Died: 18 January 2021 (aged 76)
- Spouse: Jónína Benediktsdóttir (m. 1964, divorced) Guðrún Ágústsdóttir (m. 1993)
- Children: 3
- Parents: Gestur Zóphónías Sveinsson (* 3 October 1920, died 29 December 1980) Farmer (father); Guðrún Valdimarsdóttir (* 28 March 1924) (mother)
- Education: 1964: Graduated MR.; in 1964 enrolled in law at the University.; from 1967 to 1968 studied in Berlin.

Svavar Gestsson (26 June 1944 – 18 January 2021) was an Icelandic politician and Minister for Social Affairs (from February 1980 to May 1983), Minister for Culture and Education in the cabinet of Steingrímur Hermannsson (1988–1991), Member of Parliament (1978–1999), and Ambassador (1999–2009).

== Diplomatic career ==
- From 30 August 2001 to 30 November 2005 he was ambassador in Stockholm and from 21 February 2002 to 5 June 2006 concurrently accredited in Belgrade, Sofia, Tirana and Dhaka
- From 22 November 2005 to 15 February 2010 he was ambassador in Copenhagen and from 21 June 2006 to 16 December 2010 Ambassador of Iceland concurrently to Turkey, Israel, Rumenia, Tunis.
