= List of ambassadors of Iceland to Germany =

Ambassador of Iceland to Germany
- Sendiherra Íslands í Þýskalandi
- Incumbent; Auðunn Atlason since 2024
- Inaugural holder: Vilhjálmur Finsen
- Formation: 22 October 1952

Iceland's first ambassador to Germany was Vilhjálmur Finsen in 1952. Iceland's current ambassador to Germany is Auðunn Atlason. The embassy is in the Pan Nordic Building in Berlin.

== List of ambassadors ==
Ambassadors of Iceland to Germany
Number	Name	Appointment	Termination of mission
1	Vilhjálmur Finsen	22 October 1952	1 July 1955
2	Helgi Pálson Briem	1 July 1955	1 January 1961
3	Pétur Thorsteinsson	1 January 1961	1 June 1962
4	Magnús V. Magnússon	1 June 1962	30 September 1969
5	Árni Tryggvason	1 October 1969	20 February 1976
6	Niels P. Sigurðsson	20 February 1976	17 November 1978
7	Pétur Eggerz	17 November 1978	16 September 1983
8	Hannes Jónsson	16 September 1983	6 February 1987
9	Páll Ásgeir Tryggvason	6 February 1987	10 October 1989
10	Hjálmar W. Hannesson	10 October 1989	3 October 1991
(10)	Hjálmar W. Hannesson	3 October 1991	15 February 1995
11	Ingimundur Sigfússon	15 February 1995	26 September 2001
12	Jón Egill Egilsson	26 September 2001	10 January 2005
13	Ólafur Davíðsson	10 January 2005	22 March 2010
14	Gunnar Snorri Gunnarsson	22 March 2010	2016
15	Martin Eyjólfsson	2016	2019
16	María Erla Marelsdóttir	2019	2024
17	Auðunn Atlason	4 September 2024	incumbent

== See also ==
- Germany–Iceland relations
- Foreign relations of Iceland
- Ambassadors of Iceland
