= List of ambassadors of Iceland to Czechoslovakia =

Ambassador of Iceland to Czechoslovakia
- Sendiherra Íslands í Tékkóslóvakíu
- Inaugural holder: Pétur Benediktsson
- Formation: 30 April 1946
- Final holder: Einar Benediktsson
- Abolished: 9 November 1993
- Succession: Ambassador of Iceland to the Czech Republic; Ambassador of Iceland to Slovakia

Iceland's first ambassador to Czechoslovakia was Pétur Benediktsson in 1946. Iceland's last ambassador to Czechoslovakia was Einar Benediktsson in 1993.

== List of ambassadors ==
#	Name	Appointment	Termination of mission
1	Pétur Benediktsson	30 April 1946	30 April 1951
2	Stefán Þorvarðsson	30 April 1951	20 August 1951
3	Bjarni Ásgeirsson	3 January 1952	15 June 1956
4	Haraldur Guðmundsson	28 August 1957	1 July 1963
5	Hans Georg Andersen	1 July 1963	31 August 1969
6	Agnar Klemens Jónsson	1 February 1970	26 October 1976
7	Árni Tryggvason	26 October 1976	28 February 1980
8	Páll Ásgeir Tryggvason	28 February 1980	24 April 1986
9	Niels P. Sigurðsson	24 April 1986	4 May 1990
10	Haraldur Kröyer	4 May 1990	17 January 1991
11	Einar Benediktsson	17 January 1991	9 November 1993

== See also ==
- Foreign relations of Iceland
- Ambassadors of Iceland
