= Árni Þór Sigurðsson =

Icelandic diplomat

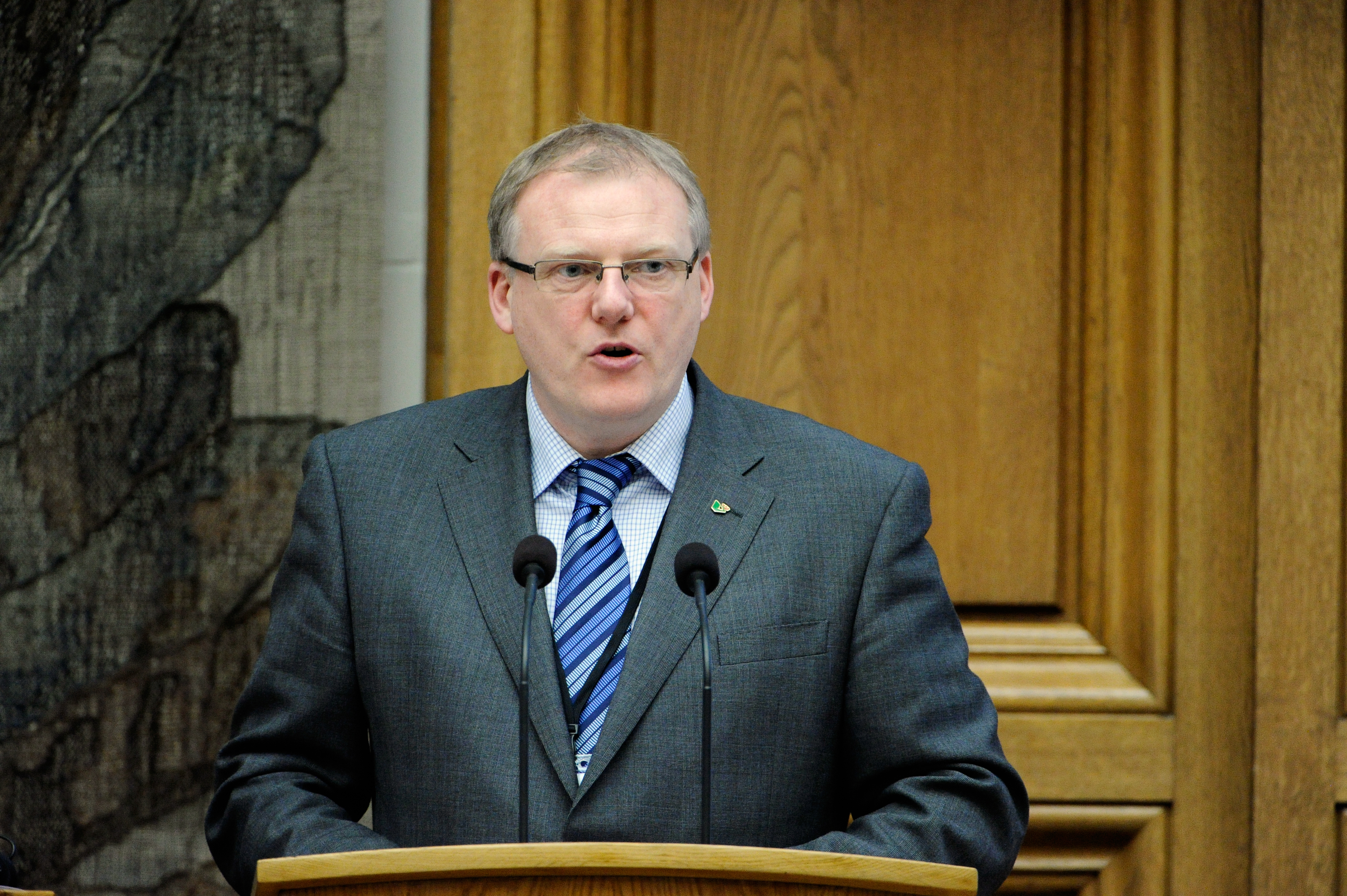
- Árni Þór in 2011

Icelandic Ambassador to Denmark
- In office 2023 – 2024
- Preceded by: Helga Hauksdóttir
- Succeeded by: Pétur Ásgeirsson

Icelandic Ambassador to Russia
- In office 2020 – 2023
- Preceded by: Berglind Ásgeirsdóttir
- Succeeded by: (vacant)

Icelandic Ambassador to Finland
- In office 2018 – 2020
- Preceded by: Kristín A. Árnadóttir
- Succeeded by: Auðunn Atlason

Senior Arctic Official for Iceland
- In office 2015 – 2018
- Preceded by: Thorsteinn Ingolfsson
- Succeeded by: Bryndís Kjartansdóttir

Personal details
- Born: 30 July 1960 (age 65) Reykjavík, Iceland
- Party: Left-Green Movement
- Spouse: Sigurbjörg Þorsteinsdóttir
- Children: 3

Árni Þór Sigurðsson (born 30 July 1960) is an Icelandic diplomat and former member of the Althing. He is temporarily the Chairman of the Special Executive Committee for Grindavik Affairs, that was established to address the challenges faced by the town of Grindavík due to recent seismic activities, including earthquakes and volcanic eruptions. He is on leave from the Foreign Service and has previously served as ambassador of Iceland to Denmark, to Finland, and to the Russian Federation.

== Education ==
Árni Þór received a cand.mag. degree in Economics and Russian from the University of Oslo in 1986 and subsequently pursued graduate studies in Slavic languages at the Stockholm University and the University of Moscow. He received a master's degree in international relations from the University of Iceland in 2015.

== Career ==
From the early 1990s until his election to the Althing in 2007, he served in various roles at the Icelandic Teachers' Union, the Icelandic Ports Association, and on the Reykjavík City Council.

At the Althing, Árni Þór represented Reykjavík Constituency North as a member of the Left-Green Movement until 2014. He served on a variety of committees and chaired the Foreign Affairs Committee from 2009 to 2013 and the Parliamentary Delegation to European Free Trade Association from 2009 to 2013. He co-chaired the Iceland-EU Joint Parliamentary Committee and was a delegate to the Nordic Council from 2010 to 2013 where he chaired the Standing Committee of Culture and Education. He was Deputy Speaker of the Althing twice in 2009-2010 and 2012–2013. He was chair, vice-chair, or acting chair of the Left-Green Movement's parliamentary group from 2009 to 2012.

Árni Þór was appointed to the Icelandic foreign service in 2014. From 2015 he was Ambassador for Arctic Affairs, representing Iceland in the Arctic Council and from 2018 he was Iceland's Ambassador to Finland, also accredited to Estonia, Latvia, Lithuania, and Ukraine. He became Ambassador to Russia in 2020.

He has been decorated a Commander of the Grand Cross of the Order of the Lion of Finland.

Shortly after the closure of Iceland's embassy in Moscow in 2023, Árni Þór became Ambassador to Denmark.

== Klaustur Affair ==
During the Klaustur Affair, it was revealed that Gunnar Bragi Sveinsson had appointed Árni Þór as an ambassador in order to draw attention away from Geir Haarde, whose simultaneous appointment was a political favour to the Independence Party.

Árni Þór responded with a public statement emphasizing that his experience made him a good candidate for the role.

== Personal life ==
Árni Þór was born in Reykjavík. He and his wife Sigurbjörg Þorsteinsdóttir have three children.
