= Germany–Iceland relations =

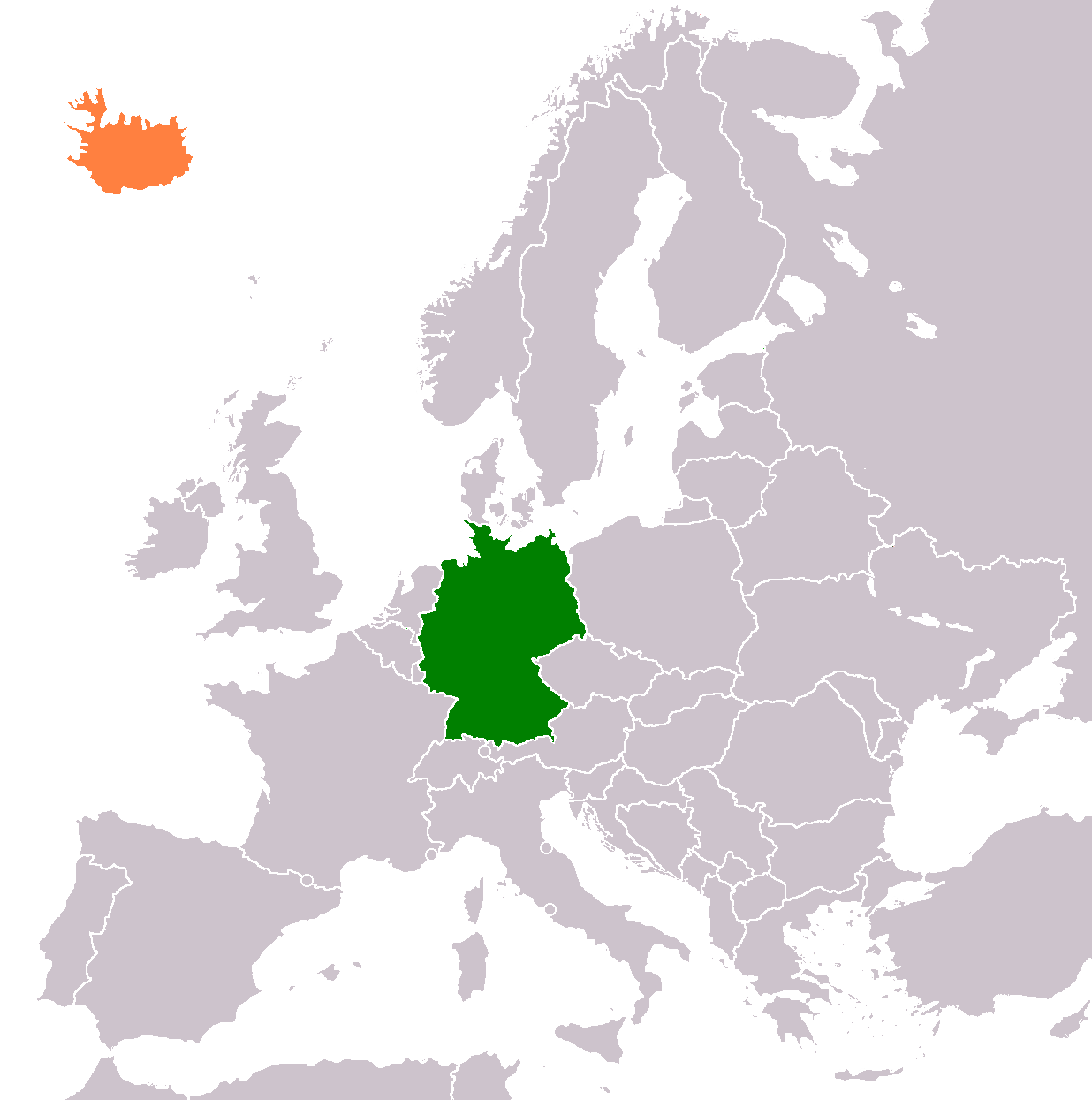

- Germany: Iceland

Germany–Iceland relations are the bilateral relations between Germany and Iceland. Germany has an embassy in Reykjavík, while Iceland has an embassy in Berlin. Both countries are also members of the OECD, the OSCE, the CBSS (although Iceland has no coast on the Baltic Sea) and the Schengen Area (although Iceland is not a member of the EU).

== History ==
=== Early history ===
Already in the saga of the Song of the Nibelungs, Brünhild, Queen of Iceland, is mentioned, who is recruited by Siegfried under the protection of his invisibility cloak during a journey to the far north for King Gunther (who has his power base in Worms).

Documented relations between Iceland and the German-speaking world date back to around 900. The first German to visit Iceland was probably missionary bishop Frederick in 981, who promoted the Christianization of Iceland during his five-year stay. The priest Dankbrand (or Thangbrand, in Icelandic Þangbrandr), an envoy of the Norwegian king, was also committed to this a few years later. The first Icelandic bishop to be consecrated was Ísleifur Gissurarson in Bremen in 1056.

Until 1104, when the ecclesiastical province of Lund was separated from the Metropolitanate of Bremen-Hamburg, the Icelandic bishopric of Skálholt, was under the metropolitan authority of the Archbishopric of Bremen.

The first written accounts of Iceland in German date from the 11th century and go back to Adam of Bremen.

Christopher of Bavaria (1416-1448), born Christoph von Pfalz-Neumarkt was also ruler of Iceland (Icelandic: Kristófer af Bæjaralandi) as king of Denmark, Sweden and Norway. Didrik Pining from Hildesheim, a participant in an international expedition with João Vaz Corte-Real, among others, which was to re-establish contact with Greenland in 1473-76 and is said to have reached the North American mainland in the process, was governor of Iceland from 1478 to 1490.

In the 15th and 16th centuries, trade was conducted between the Hanseatic League and especially Hamburg on the one hand and Iceland on the other. In the mid-16th century, the Lutheran-style Reformation was imposed in Iceland. In 1814, during the Napoleonic Wars, the Peace of Kiel was concluded between Sweden, Great Britain and Denmark. From the point of view of the Icelanders, this peace was a perpetuation of Denmark's dominance over their country, which had already been ruled by Norway since 1380. In 1854, the Danish trade monopoly was abolished. In World War I, Denmark, and by extension Iceland, remained neutral. Since 1918, Iceland was only loosely connected to Denmark by personal union.

=== Modern history ===
Iceland was cut off from Denmark in 1940 following the German occupation of Denmark and Norway, itself being later occupied by British troops. In November 1944, the shelling of the transport and passenger ship Goðafoss by a German submarine killed 24 people.

In 1944, Iceland declared itself an independent republic. After World War II, the states of Germany and Iceland established diplomatic relations in 1952, at the request of Konrad Adenauer. Embassies were opened in Hamburg and Reykjavík. In 1955, the Icelandic Embassy moved to Bonn, and in 1999 to Berlin. It is part of the Nordic Embassies.

Following the Second World War, Iceland became a destination for German migrants seeking employment and new opportunities. In 1949, the Agricultural Association of Iceland recruited 314 German workers, including 238 women, to address labour shortages in Icelandic agriculture.

Many of these women had experienced the economic hardship, destruction and displacement associated with the war and its aftermath. On 8 June 1949, the Icelandic vessel Esja arrived in Reykjavík carrying German workers recruited for employment on Icelandic farms.

Although some of the migrants eventually returned to Germany, many of the women settled permanently in Iceland, married Icelanders and established families. Their descendants have become part of Icelandic society, creating lasting family and cultural connections between the two countries.

This migration took place before the establishment of formal diplomatic relations between Iceland and the Federal Republic of Germany and represents an important chapter in the post-war relationship between the two nations.

There is cooperation between the two countries in NATO and the UN. The foundation of the cooperation are common values and views regarding international politics. The German government and Bundestag are in favor of Iceland's accession to the EU.

== Economic relations ==
From the 15th century, there were trade relations through the merchants of the Hanseatic League, which shaped the economic development of Iceland. In the so-called Icelandic trade, the Hanseatic city of Hamburg had the most important role. Trade also paved the way for increasing cultural exchange. Between 1602 and 1787, trade relations were interrupted by a Danish trade monopoly.

In the three so-called Cod Wars, Iceland expanded its fishing limits from four to twelve, then to 50, and finally to 200 nautical miles. While the first cod war (1958) was limited to Iceland and the United Kingdom, since all other countries (including West Germany) recognized the new Icelandic twelve-nautical-mile zone, the further expansion of fishing limits in the Second Cod War (1972) and the Third Cod War (1974) also led to conflict with West Germany. Among other things, the nets of German fishing boats were cut by Icelanders. Iceland's 200-nautical-mile zone was recognized by all EEC states on January 1, 1977.

Germany and Iceland are organized together in the European Economic Area. Economic relations are close, with a trade volume of €1.111 billion in 2019, according to the Federal Statistical Office. Germany's imports were worth €526 million, while exports were worth €585 million. The products shipped to Germany are around 53% processed goods, such as aluminum, and 38% marine products, such as fish processed in Bremerhaven and Cuxhaven. Germany exports 43% to Iceland, mainly motor vehicles, machinery and electrical engineering. For Iceland, Germany was the third most important trading partner for imports and the sixth most important for exports in 2019.

Germans play an important role for tourism in Iceland. In 2019, for example, Germany was the fourth-largest country of origin, with more than 132,000 visitors to Iceland annually, and visitors from Germany had the longest length of stay, averaging 8.8 nights.

== Cultural relations ==
German-Icelandic cultural relations go back more than a millennium; the two states have a Germanic cultural background.

Trade relations through the merchants of the Hanseatic League in the 16th century brought the art of printing and impulses for the Reformation to Iceland. The first printing of an Icelandic script took place in Hamburg in 1530. The first printing press was also exported to Iceland from there. The Bishop of Skálholt Gissur Einarsson, a proponent of the Reformation, stayed in Germany for several years; he arranged for a translation of the New Testament of Luther's Bible into Icelandic. German natural scientist Robert Bunsen traveled to Iceland in the mid-19th century and explained the geyser phenomenon.

Institutions such as the German Academic Exchange Service (DAAD) or the Goethe-Institut promote German-Icelandic cultural exchange. The library in Hafnarfjörður cooperates with the Goethe-Institut. Other sponsors of cultural relations are the German Studies Department of the University of Iceland, the Icelandic German Teachers' Association (German is an elective subject at secondary schools) and several German-Icelandic societies in Germany. In 2002, a lectorate for Icelandic was established at the Humboldt University in Berlin.

Contemporary scientific cooperation is mainly centered around marine and Arctic research.

== Diplomatic missions ==
- Germany has an embassy in Reykjavík.
- Iceland has an embassy in Berlin.
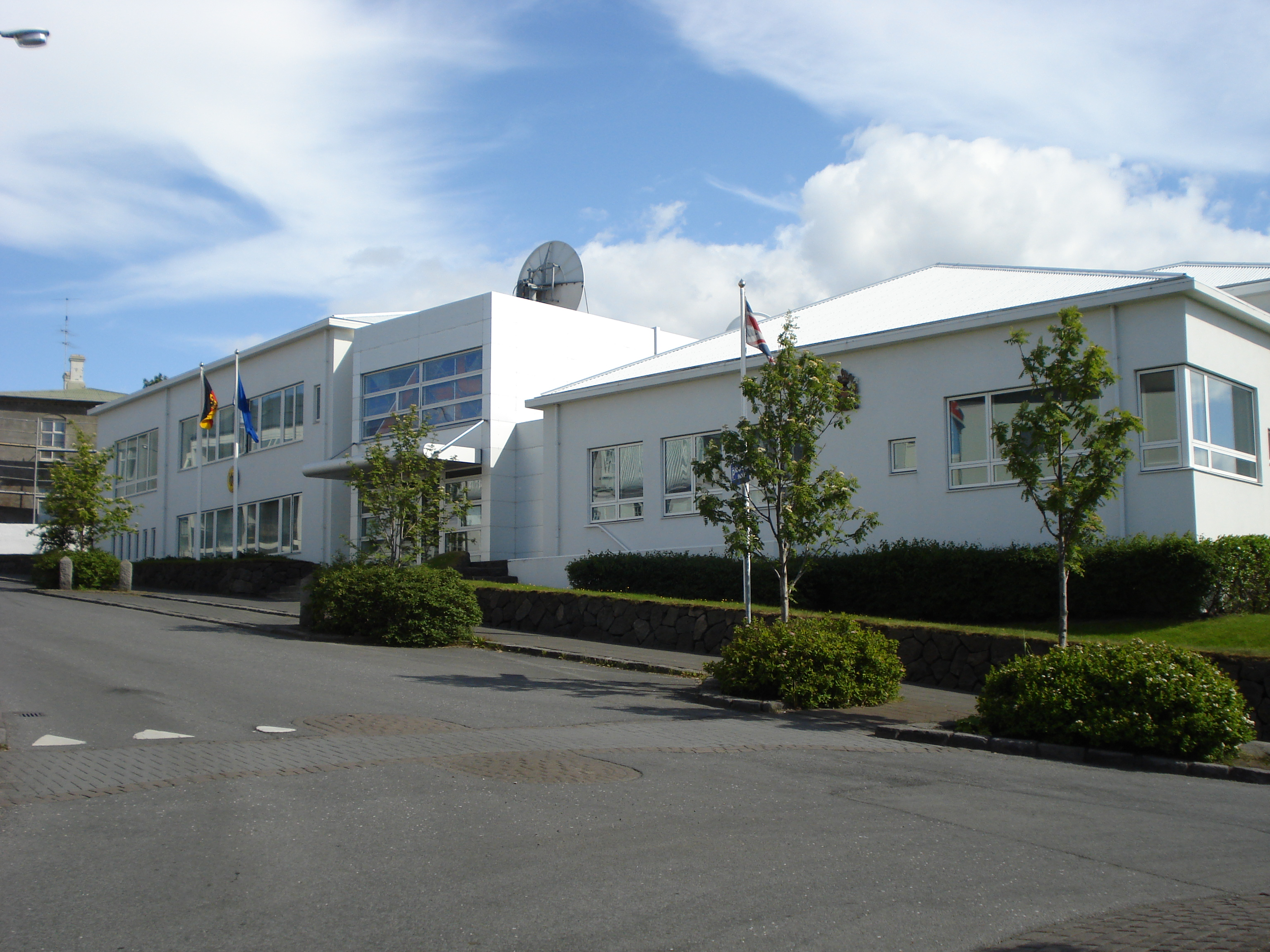
Embassy of Germany in Reykjavík

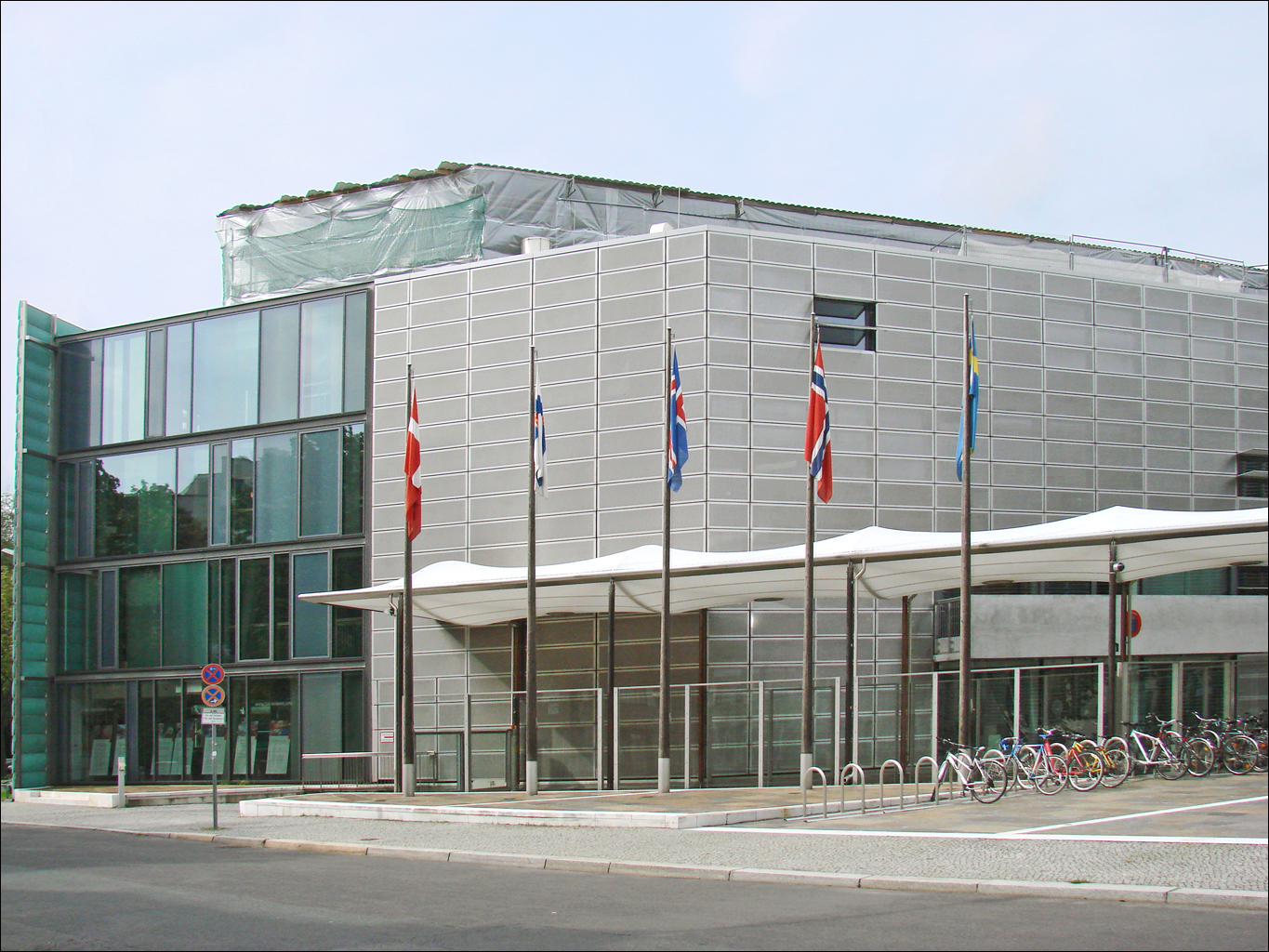
Embassy of Iceland in Berlin

== See also ==
- Foreign relations of Germany
- Foreign relations of Iceland
- Iceland-EU relations
- NATO-EU relations
