= Guðmundur Eiríksson =

Icelandic judge and academic

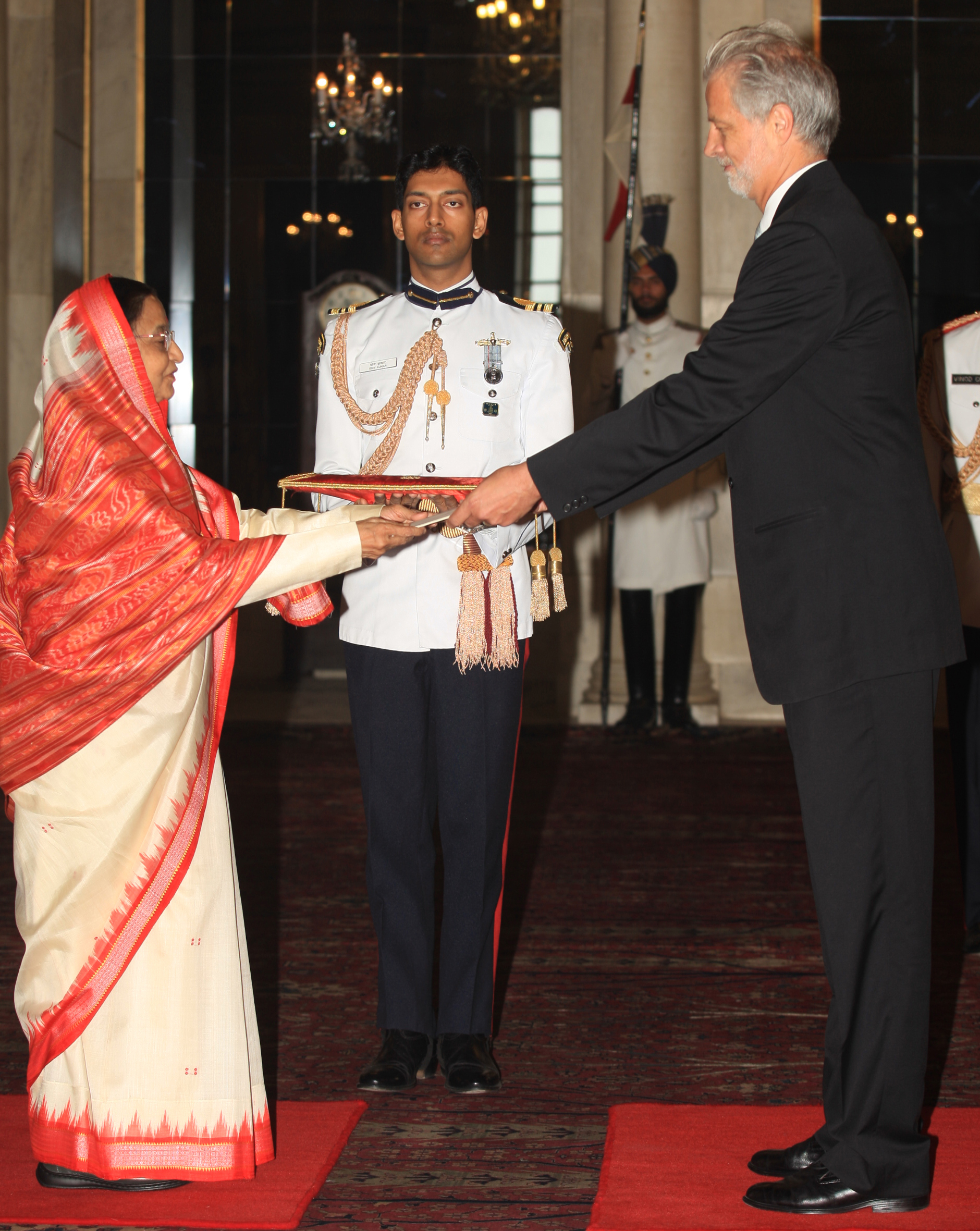
- Eiríksson presenting his diplomatic credentials to President of India Pratibha Patil, 2009

Ambassador of Iceland to New Delhi
- In office 2009–2014

Ambassador of Iceland in Pretoria
- In office 2008–2009

Ambassador of Iceland in Ottawa
- In office 2003–2005

Judge on the International Tribunal for the Law of the Sea
- In office 1996–2002

President of the Council of the North Atlantic Salmon Conservation Organization
- In office 1984–1988

Personal details
- Born: October 26, 1947 (age 78) Winnipeg, Manitoba, Canada
- Education: Rutgers University; King’s College London; Columbia Law School
- Awards: Order of the Falcon

Guðmundur Eiríksson (born October 26, 1947, in Winnipeg, Manitoba, Canada) is an Icelandic judge and law professor. He is currently serving as a judge on the arbitral tribunal in the Dispute concerning the Detention of Ukrainian Naval Vessels and Servicemen (Ukraine v. the Russian Federation) which is being conducted under Annex VII to the United Nations Convention on the Law of the Sea. He has served as an ambassador of Iceland, a member of the United Nations International Law Commission and as a judge at the International Tribunal for the Law of the Sea.

Guðmundur Eiríksson holds a Bachelor of Arts degree and a Bachelor of Science degree (Civil Engineering) from Rutgers, a Bachelor of Laws (Hon.) degree from King’s College London and a Master of Laws degree from Columbia Law School. He is a Fellow of King’s College London.

== Biography ==
Guðmundur Eiríksson served with the United Nations in New York from 1974 to 1977. He served as Assistant Legal Advisor (1977 – 1980) and Legal Advisor (1980 – 1996) in the Ministry for Foreign Affairs of Iceland. He also served as Ambassador of Iceland in Ottawa (2003 – 2005), Pretoria (2008 – 2009) and New Delhi (2009 – 2014). He was a member of the United Nations International Law Commission from 1987 to 1996 (Rapporteur 1990; First Vice-Chairman 1993). He served as a Judge at the International Tribunal for the Law of the Sea from 1996 to 2002 (President, Chamber for Fisheries Disputes 1999 – 2002) and a Judge ad hoc in the M/V “Norstar” Case before the Tribunal (2016 – 2019). He was a member of Icelandic delegations in various international forums, including the Council of the North Atlantic Salmon Conservation Organization where he also served as President from 1984 to 1988.

Guðmundur Eiríksson has lectured at 40 Universities across the world, including the University of Iceland (1987 – 1996), the University of New Mexico School of Law (1994 – 1995) and the University for Peace (2001 – 2003 and 2005 – 2008). He also co-founded and co-directed the Programme on International Law and Human Rights at the University for Peace. He currently holds the position of Professor and Executive Director, Centre for International Legal Studies, Jindal Global Law School and Advisor, International Office and Global Initiatives, O.P. Jindal Global University. He has written various articles on International Law over the course of his career, and is the author of the book The International Tribunal for the Law of the Sea (Martinus Nijhoff Publishers, 2000).

A Liber Amicorum was published for Guðmundur Eiríksson in 2017, with contributions from 33 colleagues, friends and former students on various topics connected with International Law.

He was conferred the Commander's Cross of the Icelandic Order of the Falcon by the President of Iceland in 1995.
