= Benedikt Jónsson =

Icelandic diplomat

Benedikt Jónsson (born 25 November 1954, in Reykjavík) is the current Consul General of Iceland, the Faroe Islands and Greenland. He has previously served as Icelandic ambassador to Albania, Austria, Belgium, Bulgaria, Croatia, the Czech Republic, Cyprus, Estonia, France, Germany, Greece, Hungary, Italy, the Republic of Ireland, Latvia, Lithuania, Liechtenstein, Luxembourg, Malta, the Netherlands, Poland, Portugal, Romania, Slovakia, Slovenia, Spain, Switzerland and the United Kingdom and also Permanent Secretary of State. He became first secretary in the foreign ministry in 1983 and subsequently served in the Icelandic embassy in Paris, as Deputy Permanent Representative to the European Union and the Schengen Area, as Permanent Representative to the United Nations and other international organisations in Geneva, as chief negotiator for NATO, the European Union and the EFTA with Mexico and Chile and as Chairman of the WTO Committee on Least Developed Countries.
