= Thor Thors =

Icelandic lawyer and diplomat (1903–1965)

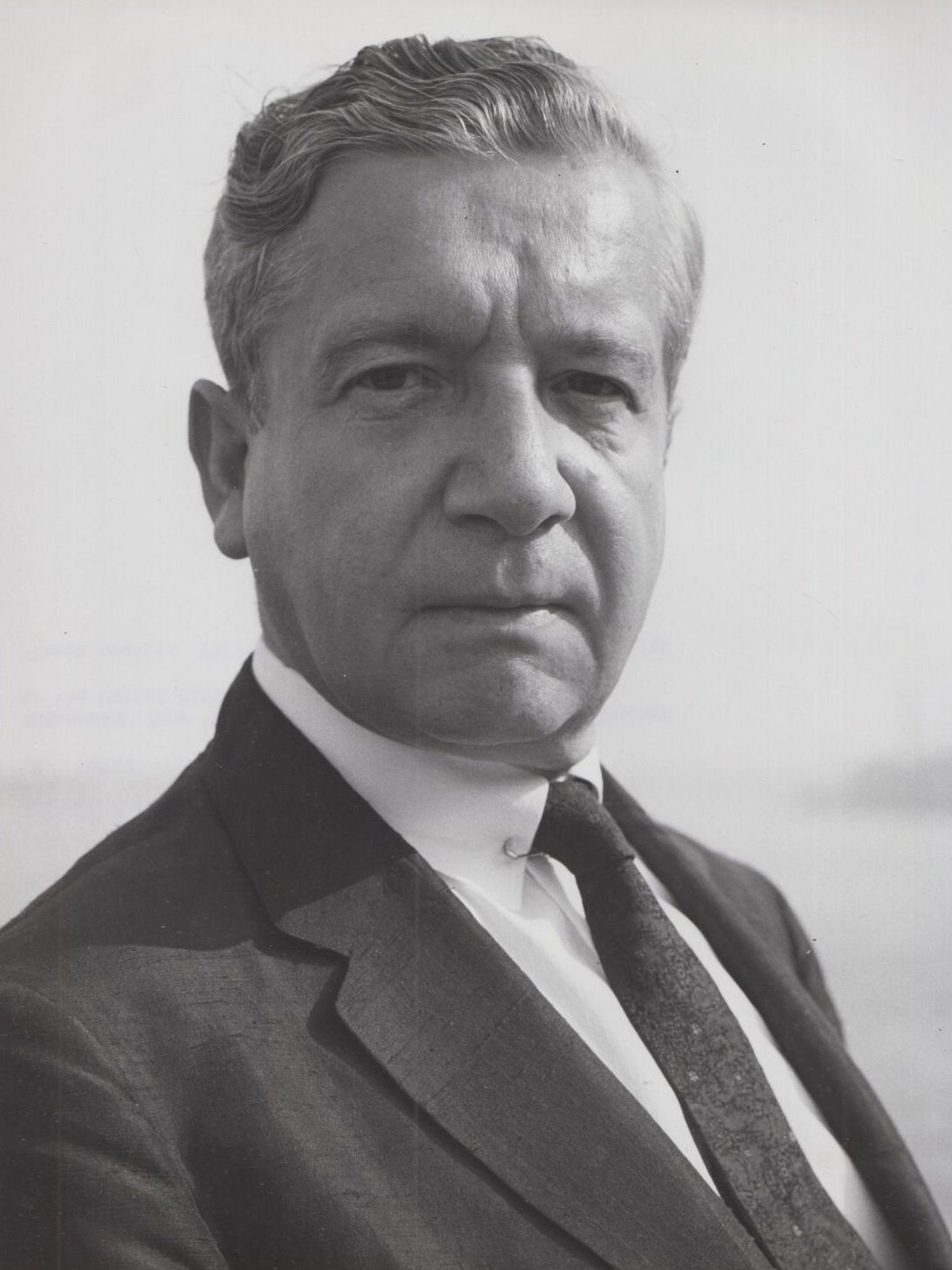
- Thors, c. 1960

Personal details
- Born: 26 November 1903
- Died: 11 January 1965 (aged 61)
- Education: University of Iceland

Thor Thors (26 November 1903 – 11 January 1965) was an Icelandic lawyer, ambassador in the US, and Iceland's first Permanent Representative at the United Nations. He was the son of Thor Jensen, the influential entrepreneur, counting among his siblings the leading Icelandic politician Ólafur Thors.

== Life ==
Thor graduated from Menntaskólinn í Reykjavík and was the president of its student society Framtíðin in 1921. He graduated in law from the University of Iceland and undertook postgraduate studies in economics in Cambridge and Paris before deciding to work as the director of the family fishing company Kveldúlfur hf. Thor did this from 1927 to 1934. From 1933 to 1941 he was a member of the Icelandic parliament for the Independence Party for the Snæfell constituency. In 1940 he served as the Icelandic ambassador in the US and from 1946 to 1965 he was Iceland's first Permanent Representative to the United Nations. In 1952, he presented the gavel, called Thor's gavel, to the United Nations President of the General Assembly.

Thors appeared on American panel show What's My Line? on 13 November 1955.
