= Bergdís Ellertsdóttir =

Icelandic diplomat

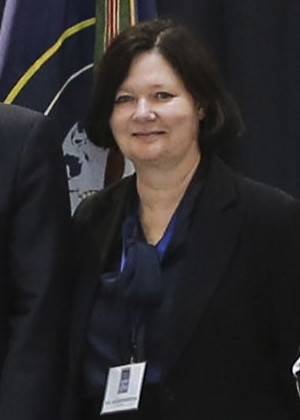
Bergdís Ellertsdóttir in 2019

Bergdís Ellertsdóttir (born 1962) is an Icelandic diplomat. She is the current ambassador of Iceland to the United States. She was a permanent representative of Iceland to the United Nations 2018–2019. Since 1991, when she joined Iceland's Ministry for Foreign Affairs, she has had a diplomatic career with assignments covering NATO, EFTA, and the European Union. She has also served as Iceland's ambassador to Belgium, the Netherlands, Luxembourg, Switzerland and San Marino.

== Early life and education ==
Born in Iceland in 1962, Bergdís Ellertsdóttir attended the University of Freiburg in Germany where she studied German (1982–1983) followed by political science, English and history (1983–1985). She went on to study political science and English at the University of Iceland graduating in 1987. She completed her studies at the University of Essex where she received an M.A. in European Studies in 1989.

== Career ==
In 1991, Bergdís Ellertsdóttir joined Iceland's Ministry for Foreign Affairs where she was first secretary in the trade department. She then joined the Icelandic Embassy in Bonn, Germany, where she was deputy head of mission. From 2000 to 2003, she was deputy director of the political department dealing with security issues, NATO, OSCE and bilateral relations with the United States, Canada and Russia. In 2003, she became deputy director general in the foreign affairs ministry's trade department, becoming director-general for international security and development in 2007.

The same year she was appointed deputy secretary general of EFTA in Brussels, serving until 2012. She was the chief negotiator in the Iceland-China Free Trade Agreement in September 2012. In September 2014, she was appointed head of the Icelandic Mission to the European Union as well as ambassador of Iceland to Belgium, the Netherlands, Luxembourg, Switzerland and San Marino.

In August 2018, Bergdís Ellertsdóttir was appointed Iceland's permanent representative to the United Nations. The following October it was announced that she would be Iceland's ambassador to the United States from 1 August 2019.
