= Kristín A. Árnadóttir =

Icelandic diplomat

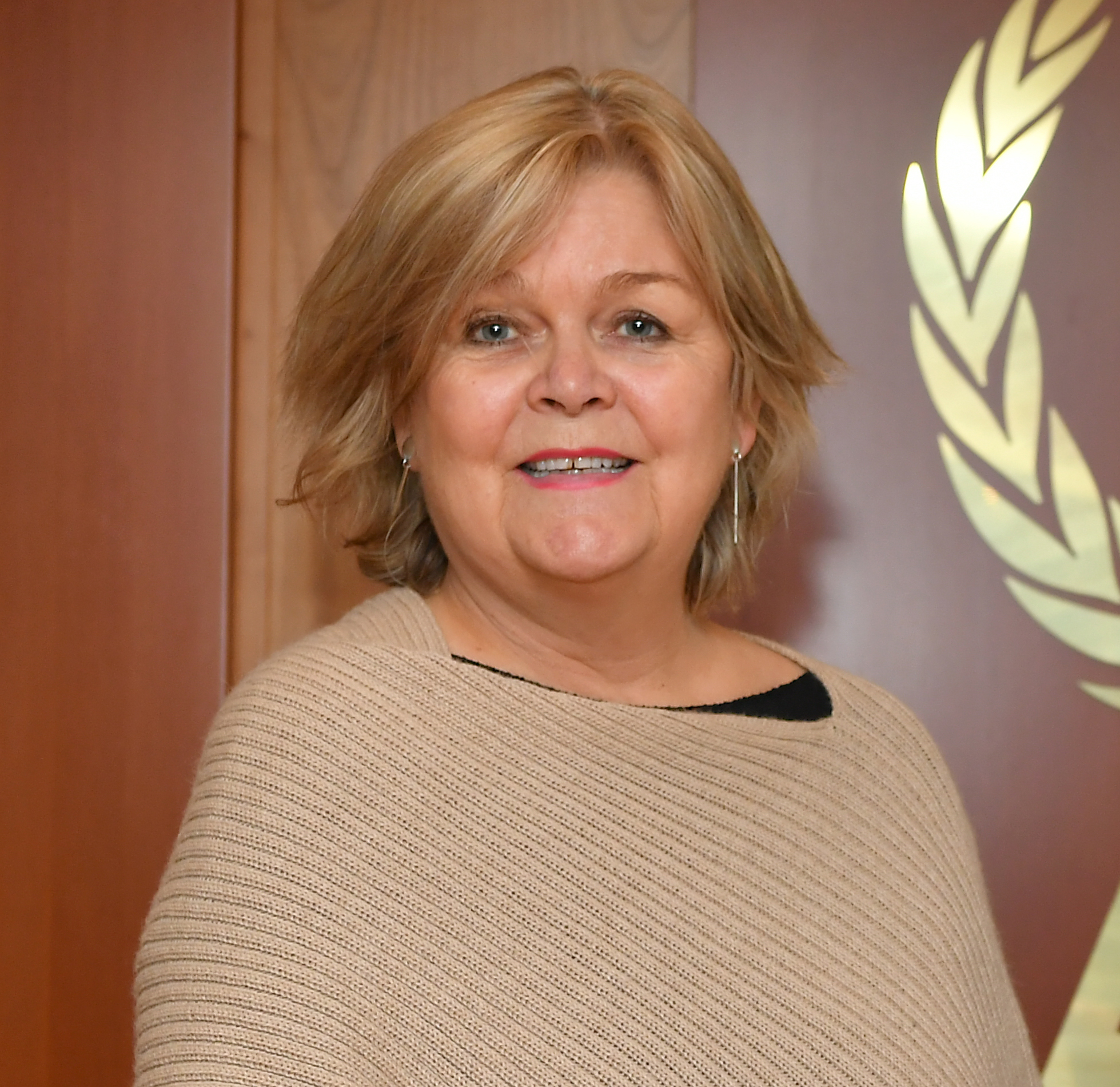
Kristin A Arnadottir

Kristín Aðalbjörg Árnadóttir (born 18 March 1957) is an Icelandic diplomat. She is currently Permanent representative to UN organisations in Vienna as well as ambassador to Slovakia. She was ambassador of gender equality in the Ministry for Foreign Affairs in Reykjavík 2018–2021. Previously, she has served as ambassador to Finland (and non resident ambassador to Estonia, Latvia, Lithuania and Ukraine) (2013-2017), and ambassador to China and several other countries in Asia.

== Education ==
Kristín obtained a master's degree in public administration and governance from Syracuse University.

== Career ==
=== Early positions ===
Kristín was originally hired as assistant to the mayor of Reykjavík in 1994. On 29 December 2000 by unanimous decision by the four members of the City Council, she was appointed Director of Development and Information from 2001 to 2005, later continuing her work in the mayor's office. She was given leave in July 2007 to act as project manager of Iceland's bid to join the UN Security Council, which was voted on in October 2008. She was immediately after the UN vote given the position of head manager and ambassador for the newly combined offices of Minister and Secretary of State within the Icelandic Ministry of Foreign Affairs in November 2008.

=== Ambassadorship ===
Kristín was announced as being assigned as Iceland's ambassador to China in October 2009, in replacement of Gunnar Snorri Gunnarsson, the new ambassador to Germany after the position was opened.

From 2010 to 2013, she was an ambassador to China (and non resident ambassador to Australia, Cambodia, Laos, Mongolia, New Zealand, North Korea, South Korea, Thailand and Vietnam)

The credential confirmation for her ambassadorship to China was conducted on 11 January 2010 by then president Hu Jintao. Similarly, her ambassadorship to Vietnam was officially confirmed on 9 December 2010, after presenting her credentials to then President of Vietnam Nguyễn Minh Triết.

She is the ambassador to Slovakia.

=== Other activities ===
From 1995 to 2006, Kristín was the vice-president of the organization European Cities Against Drugs (ECAD).
