= Sigríður Ásdís Snævarr =

Icelandic diplomat

Sigríður Ásdís Snævarr (born 23 June 1952) is an Icelandic diplomat and was the first woman to be appointed as an ambassador by Iceland, serving as ambassador to Sweden from 1991 to 1996.

== Education ==
Sigríður was a fellow at Harvard Russian Research Center and holds a teaching diploma in Italian from Perugia University, a B.Sc.Econ in Economic International Relations from the London School of Economics, and a M.A. from The Fletcher School of Law and Diplomacy where she studied on a Fulbright Scholarship.

== Professional life ==
Sigríður joined the Icelandic foreign service in 1978 and started her diplomatic career in the Soviet Union in 1979 at the height of the Cold War. She served as counsellor at the embassy of Iceland in Bonn, before she broke ground being the first Icelandic woman to be appointed as ambassador, in 1991. She has served as Iceland's ambassador to Sweden, Finland, Estonia, Latvia, Slovenia, Namibia, South Africa, Mozambique, France, Italy, Spain, and Portugal. While posted in Paris she also served as the Permanent Representative to OECD, to FAO and to UNESCO during the time when Iceland had a seat on the executive board.

In 2008 Sigríður took a temporary leave of absence from the foreign service and started a private company, “Nýttu kraftinn,” to train and empower 1100 job seekers in the wake of the Icelandic banking crisis. In 2013 she published a book reflecting on her job retraining efforts.

Sigríður now trains new diplomats and coaches ambassadors before new postings. She is in the steering group guiding the future work of Icelandic diplomacy and leads a unit of home-based ambassadors in the Ministry for Foreign Affairs. Sigríður is a public speaker on topics such as gender equality. She is also on the board of the Icelandic medical imaging company Oxymap.

== Personal life ==
Sigríður is married to Kjartan Gunnarsson. They have one son born in 2007. At 55 years old, Sigríður was the oldest known Icelandic woman to give birth. Sigríður's parents were Valborg Sigurðardóttir and Ármann Snævarr. She has 4 siblings.
