= Benedikt Ásgeirsson =

Icelandic diplomat

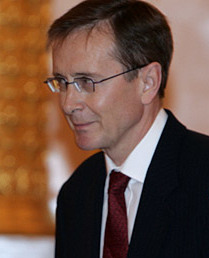
Benedikt Ásgeirsson in 2006

Benedikt Ásgeirsson (born 7 February 1951, in Reykjavík) is an Icelandic diplomat and was an Ambassador of Iceland to Russia from 2006 to 2011.

In 1995 Benedikt was appointed as an ambassador in the United Kingdom. In 1997 Benedikt launched a sailing competition between Portsmouth in UK and Reykjavík in Iceland.

In 2002 Benedikt oversaw security for a NATO meeting held in Iceland.

In 2018 Benedikt and Unnur, on behalf of Iceland, made an open skies agreement with Burkina Faso, Jamaica, Rwanda and Turkey.
