= Guðmundur Ívarsson Guðmundsson =

Icelandic politician (1909–1987)

Guðmundur Ívarsson Guðmundsson (17 July 1909 – 19 December 1987) was an Icelandic politician and former minister. He was the Minister of Finance of Iceland from 1958 to 1959. He was also a diplomat who served as ambassador to the United Kingdom (with concurrent accreditation in the Netherlands), to Spain and Portugal, to Nigeria (1971), to the United States (1971-1973 with concurrent accreditation in Canada, Mexico, Cuba, Brazil and Argentina), to Sweden (1973-1977 with concurrent accreditation in Finland and Austria) and to Belgium, Luxembourg, the European Union and NATO (1977-1979).
