= Ambassadors of Iceland =

This is a list of ambassadors of Iceland (excluding consuls).

== Current ambassadors ==
Host country	Residence	Ambassador	Appointment	Ref
Andorra	Paris, France	Unnur Orradóttir Ramette	2022	
Argentina	Washington, D.C., United States	Bergdís Ellertsdóttir	2019	
Armenia	Moscow, Russia	Árni Þór Sigurðsson		
Australia	Copenhagen, Denmark	Árni Þór Sigurðsson	2023	
Austria	Vienna, Austria	Helga Hauksdóttir	2023	
Bangladesh	New Delhi, India	Guðni Bragason	2021	
Belarus	Moscow, Russia	Árni Þór Sigurðsson		
Belgium	Brussels, Belgium	Kristján Andri Stefánsson	2020	
Brazil	Washington, D.C., United States	Bergdís Ellertsdóttir	2019	
Brunei	Tokyo, Japan	Stefán Haukur Jóhannesson	2021	
Bulgaria	Warsaw, Poland	Hannes Heimisson	2022	
Canada	Ottawa, Canada	Hlynur Guðjónsson	2021	
Chile	Washington, D.C., United States	Bergdís Ellertsdóttir	2019	
China	Beijing, China	Þórir Ibsen	2021	
Costa Rica	Ottawa, Canada	Hlynur Guðjónsson	2021	
Croatia	Vienna, Austria	Helga Hauksdóttir	2023	
Cuba	New York, United States	Jörundur Valtýsson	2019	
Cyprus	Stockholm, Sweden	Bryndís Kjartansdóttir		
Czech Republic	Berlin, Germany	Auðunn Atlason	2024	
Denmark	Copenhagen, Denmark	Pétur Ásgeirsson	2023	
Dominican Republic	New York, United States	Jörundur Valtýsson	2019	
Estonia	Helsinki, Finland	Harald Aspelund		
Finland	Helsinki, Finland	Harald Aspelund		
France	Paris, France	Unnur Orradóttir Ramette	2022	
Germany	Berlin, Germany	Auðunn Atlason	2024	
Greece	Oslo, Norway	Högni Kristjánsson	2022	
Holy See	Geneva, Switzerland	Einar Gunnarsson	2022	
Hungary	Vienna, Austria	Helga Hauksdóttir	2023	
India	New Delhi, India	Guðni Bragason	2021	
Indonesia	Tokyo, Japan	Stefán Haukur Jóhannesson	2021	
Ireland	London, United Kingdom	Sturla Sigurjónsson	2020	
Italy	Paris, France	Unnur Orradóttir Ramette	2022	
Japan	Tokyo, Japan	Stefán Haukur Jóhannesson	2021	
Jordan	London, United Kingdom	Sturla Sigurjónsson	2020	
Kazakhstan	Moscow, Russia	Árni Þór Sigurðsson		
Kyrgyzstan	Moscow, Russia	Árni Þór Sigurðsson		
Latvia	Helsinki, Finland	Harald Aspelund		
Lebanon	Paris, France	Unnur Orradóttir Ramette	2022	
Liechtenstein	Geneva, Switzerland	Einar Gunnarsson	2022	
Lithuania	Helsinki, Finland	Harald Aspelund		
Luxembourg	Brussels, Belgium	Kristján Andri Stefánsson	2020	
Malawi	Kampala, Uganda	Inga Dóra Pétursdóttir		
Malta	London, United Kingdom	Sturla Sigurjónsson	2020	
Mexico	Washington, D.C., United States	Bergdís Ellertsdóttir	2019	
Moldova	Moscow, Russia	Árni Þór Sigurðsson		
Monaco	Paris, France	Unnur Orradóttir Ramette	2022	
Mongolia	Beijing, China	Þórir Ibsen	2021	
Nepal	New Delhi, India	Guðni Bragason	2021	
Netherlands	Brussels, Belgium	Kristján Andri Stefánsson	2020	
New Zealand	Stockholm, Sweden	Bryndís Kjartansdóttir		
Norway	Oslo, Norway	Högni Kristjánsson	2022	
Pakistan	Oslo, Norway	Högni Kristjánsson	2022	
Philippines	Tokyo, Japan	Stefán Haukur Jóhannesson	2021	
Poland	Warsaw, Poland	Hannes Heimisson	2022	
Portugal	Paris, France	Unnur Orradóttir Ramette	2022	
Qatar	London, United Kingdom	Sturla Sigurjónsson	2020	
Romania	Warsaw, Poland	Hannes Heimisson	2022	
San Marino	Brussels, Belgium	Kristján Andri Stefánsson	2020	
Singapore	Tokyo, Japan	Stefán Haukur Jóhannesson	2021	
Slovakia	Vienna, Austria	Helga Hauksdóttir	2023	
Slovenia	Vienna, Austria	Helga Hauksdóttir	2023	
South Korea	Tokyo, Japan	Stefán Haukur Jóhannesson	2021	
Spain	Paris, France	Unnur Orradóttir Ramette	2022	
Sri Lanka	New Delhi, India	Guðni Bragason	2021	
Sweden	Stockholm, Sweden	Bryndís Kjartansdóttir		
Switzerland	Geneva, Switzerland	Einar Gunnarsson	2022	
Tajikistan	Moscow, Russia	Árni Þór Sigurðsson		
Thailand	Beijing, China	Þórir Ibsen	2021	
East Timor	Tokyo, Japan	Stefán Haukur Jóhannesson	2021	
Turkey	Copenhagen, Denmark	Árni Þór Sigurðsson	2023	
Turkmenistan	Moscow, Russia	Árni Þór Sigurðsson		
Uganda	Kampala, Uganda	Hildigunnur Engilbertsdóttir	2021	
Ukraine	Warsaw, Poland	Hannes Heimisson	2022	
United Kingdom	London, United Kingdom	Sturla Sigurjónsson	2020	
United States	Washington, D.C., United States	Bergdís Ellertsdóttir	2019	
Uzbekistan	Moscow, Russia	Árni Þór Sigurðsson		
Vietnam	Beijing, China	Þórir Ibsen	2021	

== Permanent representatives to international organisations ==
Host organisation	Location	Permanent representative	Appointment	Ref
Association of Southeast Asian Nations	Tokyo, Japan	Stefán Haukur Jóhannesson	2021	
Council of Europe, Strasbourg	Ministry for Foreign Affairs, Reykjavík	Ragnhildur Arnljótsdóttir	2020	
European Free Trade Association	Geneva, Switzerland	Einar Gunnarsson	2022	
European Union	Brussels, Belgium	Kristján Andri Stefánsson	2020	
Food and Agriculture Organization of the United Nations	Rome, Italy	Matthías Geir Pálsson		
International Atomic Energy Agency	Vienna, Austria	Helga Hauksdóttir	2023	
International Fund for Agricultural Development	Rome, Italy	Matthías Geir Pálsson		
North Atlantic Treaty Organization	Brussels, Belgium	Hermann Örn Ingólfsson	2019	
Organization for Security and Cooperation in Europe	Vienna, Austria	Helga Hauksdóttir	2023	
United Nations	New York, United States	Jörundur Valtýsson	2019	
World Food Programme	Rome, Italy	Matthías Geir Pálsson		
World Trade Organisation	Geneva, Switzerland	Einar Gunnarsson	2022	

== Ambassadors to past countries ==
- Czechoslovakia
- East Germany (German Democratic Republic)
- Serbia and Montenegro
- Soviet Union
- Yugoslavia

== See also ==
- Ambassadors to Iceland
