= List of ambassadors of Iceland to Japan =

Icelandic Ambassador to Japan
- Sendiherra Íslands í Japan
- Coat of arms of Iceland
- Incumbent; Stefán Haukur Jóhannesson since 8 April 2021
- Ministry for Foreign Affairs; Embassy of Iceland in Tokyo
- Style: His Excellency
- Reports to: Minister for Foreign Affairs
- Appointer: President of Iceland
- Inaugural holder: Magnús V. Magnússon
- Formation: 22 April 1958
- Website: Embassy of Iceland in Tokyo

Iceland's first ambassador to Japan was Magnús V. Magnússon in 1958. Iceland's current ambassador to Japan is Stefán Haukur Jóhannesson.

== List of ambassadors ==
#	Name	Appointment	Termination of mission
1	Magnús V. Magnússon	22 April 1958	30 September 1969
2	Árni Tryggvason	15 December 1969	11 October 1976
3	Pétur Thorsteinsson	11 October 1976	22 March 1988
4	Benedikt Sigurðsson Gröndal	22 March 1988	19 October 1990
5	Ólafur Egilsson	19 October 1990	28 November 1996
6	Hjálmar W. Hannesson	28 November 1996	14 October 1998
(5)	Ólafur Egilsson	14 October 1998	23 July 2001
7	Ingimundur Sigfússon	23 July 2001	7 September 2004
8	Þórður Ægir Óskarsson	7 September 2004	21 August 2008
9	Stefán Lárus Stefánsson	21 August 2008	4 September 2013
10	Hannes Heimisson	4 September 2013	14 March 2018
11	Elín Flygenring	14 March 2018	8 April 2021
12	Stefán Haukur Jóhannesson	8 April 2021	Incumbent

== See also ==
- Iceland–Japan relations
- Foreign relations of Iceland
- Ambassadors of Iceland
