= Foreign relations of Iceland =

Iceland took control of its foreign affairs in 1918 when it became a sovereign country, the Kingdom of Iceland, in a personal union with the King of Denmark. As a fully independent state, Iceland could have joined the League of Nations in 1920, but chose not to do so for cost reasons. It negotiated with Denmark to initially carry out most of its foreign relations, while maintaining full control. Denmark appointed a diplomatic envoy (Ambassador) to Iceland in 1919 and Iceland reciprocated in 1920, opening an embassy in Copenhagen. Iceland established its own Foreign Service in April 1940 when Denmark became occupied by Nazi Germany and ties between the two countries were severed. The Republic of Iceland was founded in 1944. The Icelandic foreign service grew slowly in the post-WWII period, but increased rapidly after the mid-1990s. Iceland's closest relations are with the Nordic states, the European Union and the United States. Iceland has been a member of the United Nations since 1946. Iceland was a founding member of the World Bank in 1946 and NATO in 1949. In terms of European integration, Iceland was a founding member of the OEEC (now OECD) in 1948 and the Nordic Council in 1952, it joined EFTA in 1970, was a founding member of the CSCE (now OSCE) in 1973 and the EEA in 1992 and joined Schengen in 2001.

From 1951 to 2006, there was an American military base and troop presence in Iceland. During the Cold War, Iceland had a close but contentious relationship with the United States, leading some scholars to describe Iceland as a "rebellious ally" and "reluctant ally." Iceland repeatedly threatened to leave NATO or cancel the US defence agreement during the Cold War. As a consequence, the United States provided Iceland with extensive economic assistance and diplomatic support. Iceland hosted the historic 1986 Reagan-Gorbachev summit in Reykjavík, which set the stage for the end of the Cold War.

== Fishing rights ==
Iceland's principal historical international disputes involved disagreements over fishing rights. Conflict with the United Kingdom led to the so-called Cod Wars in 1952–56 because of the extension of the fishing zone from 3 to 4 nautical miles (6 to 7 km), 1958–61 because of extending the fishing zone to 12 nautical miles (22 km) in 1972–73 because of its further extension to 50 nautical miles (93 km) and in 1975–76 because of its extension to 200 nautical miles (370 km). Disagreements with Norway and Russia over fishing rights in the Barents Sea were successfully resolved in 2000.

== Whaling ==
Certain environmentalists are concerned that Iceland left the International Whaling Commission (IWC) in June 1992 in protest of an IWC decision to refuse to lift the ban on whaling, after the IWC Scientific Committee had determined that the taking of certain species could safely be resumed. That year, Iceland established a separate commission – along with Norway, Greenland and the Faroe Islands – for the conservation, management, and study of marine mammals. Since then, Iceland has resumed whaling for scientific purpose and has rejoined the IWC (in October 2002). The Icelandic Fisheries Ministry issued a permit to hunt 39 whales for commercial purposes on 17 October 2006. 25 states delivered a formal diplomatic protest to the Icelandic government on 1 November concerning resumed commercial whaling. The protest was led by the United Kingdom and supported by others such as Finland and Sweden.

== Recognition of post-Soviet states ==
Iceland was the first country to recognize the regained independence of Lithuania, Latvia, Estonia, Georgia, Armenia and Azerbaijan from the USSR in 1990–1991. Similarly, it was the first country to recognize Montenegro's independence from its former union with Serbia. Iceland was also the first country to recognize Croatia, having done so on 19 December 1991. Significantly, Iceland was also the first Western state to recognise Palestine when it did so in 2011. Iceland also is the greatest Nordic contributor per capita to NATO-led troops in Bosnia and Kosovo, to the police in Bosnia and to Bosnian/Kosovan reconstruction, resettlement and relief efforts.

== Membership in international organizations ==
Iceland is a member of the following organisations: North Atlantic Treaty Organization; Organization for Security and Co-operation in Europe; International Criminal Court; International Bank for Reconstruction and Development; International Development Association; International Finance Corporation; Organisation for Economic Co-operation and Development; European Economic Area; European Free Trade Association; Council of Europe; International Criminal Police Organization; and the United Nations, since 19 November 1946, and most of its specialized agencies, including the International Monetary Fund, World Trade Organization, Food and Agriculture Organization, International Atomic Energy Agency, International Civil Aviation Organization, International Labour Organization, International Maritime Organization, International Telecommunication Union, United Nations Educational, Scientific, and Cultural Organization, Universal Postal Union, World Health Organization, World Meteorological Organization and the International Whaling Commission.

Iceland was given the opportunity to join the League of Nations in 1920, but opted not to, primarily due to limited administrative resources. Iceland joined the UN in 1945 but took until 1965 to establish a permanent mission.

In the IMF, Iceland is in the Nordic-Baltic constituency of the 24-member executive board of the IMF, along with Denmark, Finland, Norway, Sweden, Latvia, Lithuania and Estonia.

== International disputes ==
=== Rockall ===
Iceland has an ongoing dispute with Denmark (on behalf of the Faroe Islands) on the one hand and with the UK and Ireland on the other hand, concerning claims to the continental shelf in the Hatton–Rockall area of the North Atlantic under the UN Convention on the Law of the Sea (1982). Iceland's claim covers virtually the entire area claimed by the other three countries, except for a small portion in the south-east corner of the Irish claim, while the Faroes claim most of the area claimed by the UK and Ireland. Negotiations continue between the four countries in the hope of making a joint proposal to the United Nations Commission on the Limits of the Continental Shelf by May 2009.

=== Deposit insurance ===
Following the collapse of Icesave sparking the 2008–2011 Icelandic financial crisis, the U.K. and the Netherlands offered to insure the deposits of the bank's customers. They then sought repayment from Iceland, which held a referendum on the issue in 2010 and 2011, both of which failed. The two governments then said they would take the issue to European courts to seek redress they alleged is owed to them. In January 2013 the EFTA court cleared Iceland of all charges.

== European Union application ==
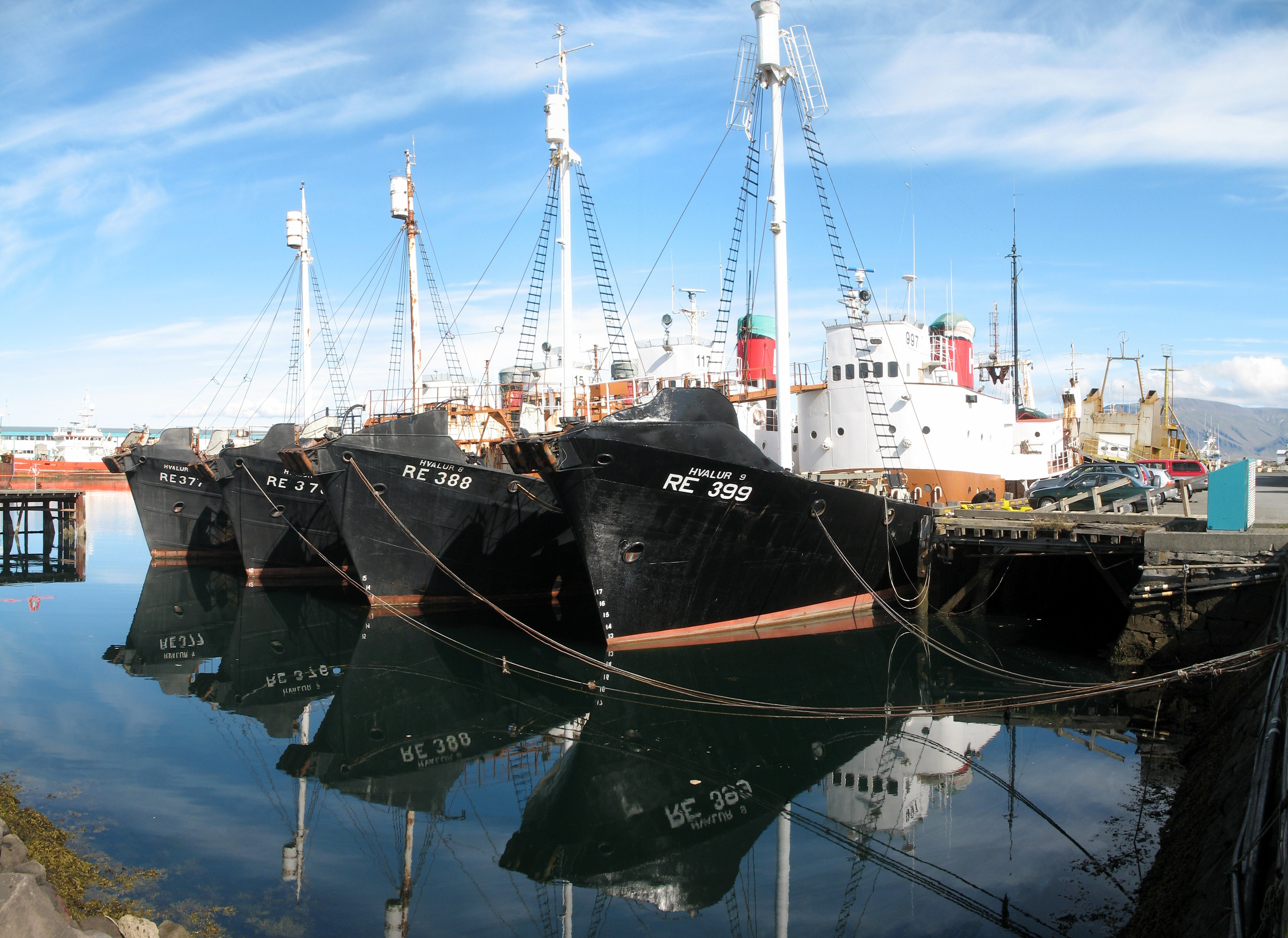
Iceland's reluctance to join the EU's Common Fisheries Policy is a major stumbling bloc to accession

Iceland has had a close relationship with the European Union (EU) throughout its development, but has remained outside (instead, joining the European Free Trade Area or EFTA). In 1972, the two sides signed a free trade agreement and in 1994 Iceland joined the European Economic Area which let itself and other non-EU states have access to the EU's internal market in exchange for Iceland contributing funds and applying EU law in relevant areas. The EU is Iceland's most important trading partner with a strong trade surplus in 2008/9 in terms of goods, services and foreign direct investment. Iceland also participates in the Schengen Area (as well as relevant police and judicial cooperation) and has non-voting representation in some EU agencies.

However, after Iceland's financial crash in 2008, it has sought membership of the EU and the euro. Iceland applied on 16 July 2009 and negotiations formally began 17 June 2011. After an agreement is concluded, the accession treaty must be ratified by every EU state and be subject to a national referendum in Iceland. Since the application was submitted, popular support has declined and contentious issues around Icelandic fisheries may derail negotiations. However the Icelandic government is confident an agreement can be reached based on the flexibility shown by the EU in its previous negotiations with Norway.

In 2014, Iceland froze their application to join the European Union.

== Agreed Minute ==
The Agreed Minute was a statute governing the nature of the U.S. military presence in Iceland. The Agreed Minute was last renegotiated in 2001. At the time, the U.S. Air Force committed itself to maintaining four to six interceptors at the Keflavík base, supported by a helicopter rescue squad. The Air Force, in order to cut costs, announced plans to remove the four remaining jets in 2003. The removal was then delayed to address Icelandic demands for continued presence of the jets. After an unfruitful series of negotiations and two reshuffles of the Icelandic government the issue lay dormant until early 2006 when the U.S. Air Force issued an official statement that withdrawal of the aircraft was already being prepared. U.S. officials have since then argued that Iceland is in no need of a military presence.

NATO allies since then conduct air policing after the U.S. Air Force withdrawal.

== Diplomatic relations ==
List of countries which Iceland maintains diplomatic relations with:

#	Country	Date
1	Denmark	1 December 1918
2	United Kingdom	8 May 1940
3	Sweden	27 July 1940
4	Norway	29 August 1940
5	United States	1 July 1941
6	Russia	4 October 1943
7	Italy	15 August 1945
8	Belgium	9 November 1945
9	France	18 November 1945
10	Netherlands	9 January 1946
11	Czech Republic	27 February 1946
12	Poland	14 November 1946
13	Canada	6 June 1947
14	Switzerland	15 July 1947
15	Finland	15 August 1947
16	Portugal	23 January 1948
17	Ireland	11 March 1948
18	Iran	15 March 1948
19	Spain	20 September 1949
20	Israel	10 August 1951
21	Argentina	21 April 1952
22	Brazil	28 April 1952
23	Germany	10 July 1952
24	Serbia	27 February 1953
25	Hungary	17 July 1955
26	Cuba	26 January 1956
27	Romania	18 May 1956
28	Japan	8 December 1956
29	Turkey	25 November 1957
30	Greece	6 June 1958
31	Luxembourg	30 July 1962
32	South Korea	10 October 1962
33	Chile	6 November 1963
34	Bulgaria	19 November 1963
35	Mexico	24 March 1964
36	Austria	20 July 1964
37	Peru	14 November 1967
38	Egypt	20 May 1968
39	Ethiopia	20 May 1968
40	Niger	26 January 1970
41	Tunisia	14 May 1970
42	Nigeria	3 November 1970
43	China	14 December 1971
44	India	11 May 1972
45	Lebanon	28 March 1973
46	North Korea	27 July 1973
47	Vietnam	5 August 1973
48	Kenya	30 October 1973
49	Mongolia	4 June 1974
50	Bahamas	18 March 1975
51	Thailand	18 June 1975
52	Albania	9 April 1976
–	Holy See	12 October 1976
53	Pakistan	7 December 1976
54	Cape Verde	20 July 1977
55	Ghana	11 October 1977
56	Tanzania	17 November 1977
57	Iraq	20 April 1978
58	Bahrain	20 May 1978
59	Bangladesh	23 November 1978
60	San Marino	29 September 1978
61	Barbados	9 April 1979
62	Cyprus	4 September 1979
63	Venezuela	15 January 1981
64	Nepal	25 May 1981
65	Colombia	15 September 1981
66	Saudi Arabia	15 January 1982
67	Nicaragua	16 December 1982
68	Grenada	14 January 1983
69	Algeria	17 May 1983
70	Indonesia	13 June 1983
71	Yemen	20 July 1983
72	Lesotho	24 August 1983
73	Australia	12 February 1984
74	Somalia	20 March 1985
75	Morocco	24 September 1985
76	Angola	2 November 1988
77	New Zealand	21 October 1988
78	Maldives	30 January 1990
79	Botswana	5 April 1990
80	Seychelles	8 November 1990
81	Jordan	5 December 1990
82	Namibia	10 December 1990
83	Uruguay	18 June 1991
84	Estonia	26 August 1991
85	Latvia	26 August 1991
86	Lithuania	26 August 1991
87	Slovenia	24 February 1992
88	Oman	26 February 1992
89	Ukraine	30 March 1992
90	Liechtenstein	26 June 1992
91	Croatia	30 June 1992
92	Georgia	21 September 1992
93	Slovakia	1 January 1993
94	Marshall Islands	25 January 1993
95	Guatemala	5 August 1993
96	Eswatini	3 December 1993
97	North Macedonia	29 December 1993
98	Moldova	17 May 1994
99	South Africa	31 May 1994
100	Andorra	3 August 1995
101	Kuwait	26 April 1996
102	Bosnia and Herzegovina	8 May 1996
103	Costa Rica	10 January 1997
104	Turkmenistan	13 February 1997
105	Mozambique	5 March 1997
106	Armenia	15 May 1997
107	Uzbekistan	25 September 1997
108	Azerbaijan	27 February 1998
109	Malta	3 July 1998
110	Malawi	14 August 1998
111	Sri Lanka	23 December 1998
112	Philippines	24 February 1999
113	Singapore	4 May 1999
114	Panama	4 June 1999
115	Malaysia	4 April 2000
116	Jamaica	24 May 2000
117	El Salvador	25 October 2000
118	Kyrgyzstan	2 April 2001
119	Belarus	25 May 2001
120	Burkina Faso	23 October 2001
121	Qatar	24 January 2002
122	Sudan	13 June 2003
123	Cambodia	19 June 2003
124	Dominican Republic	23 June 2003
125	United Arab Emirates	17 September 2003
126	Timor-Leste	4 December 2003
127	Ecuador	11 December 2003
128	Mauritius	15 December 2003
129	Nauru	17 February 2004
130	Antigua and Barbuda	11 March 2004
131	Libya	15 March 2004
132	Afghanistan	17 March 2004
133	Paraguay	17 March 2004
134	Senegal	7 April 2004
135	Chad	14 April 2004
136	Saint Kitts and Nevis	5 May 2004
137	Syria	6 May 2004
138	Gambia	11 May 2004
139	Rwanda	12 May 2004
140	Guinea	14 May 2004
141	Kazakhstan	14 May 2004
142	Saint Vincent and the Grenadines	27 May 2004
143	Uganda	22 June 2004
144	Dominica	29 June 2004
145	Belize	7 July 2004
146	Mali	23 July 2004
147	Zambia	23 July 2004
148	Papua New Guinea	12 August 2004
149	Laos	2 September 2004
150	Equatorial Guinea	10 September 2004
151	Honduras	15 September 2004
152	Bolivia	17 September 2004
153	Guinea-Bissau	24 September 2004
154	Federated States of Micronesia	27 September 2004
155	Vanuatu	27 September 2004
156	Eritrea	6 October 2004
157	Mauritania	6 October 2004
158	Palau	6 October 2004
159	Samoa	15 October 2004
160	Comoros	29 October 2004
161	Suriname	9 November 2004
162	Togo	19 November 2004
163	Republic of the Congo	15 December 2004
164	Benin	23 February 2005
165	Guyana	10 March 2005
166	Gabon	27 May 2005
167	Djibouti	19 July 2005
168	Tuvalu	26 July 2005
169	Kiribati	15 September 2005
170	Ivory Coast	14 October 2005
171	Haiti	18 November 2005
172	Tajikistan	14 February 2006
173	Brunei	27 April 2006
174	Saint Lucia	7 May 2006
175	Madagascar	21 September 2006
176	Montenegro	26 September 2006
177	Sierra Leone	13 November 2006
178	Liberia	28 November 2006
179	Burundi	14 December 2006
180	Democratic Republic of the Congo	23 February 2007
181	Solomon Islands	20 April 2007
182	Cameroon	19 September 2007
183	São Tomé and Príncipe	24 September 2007
184	Tonga	14 December 2007
185	Fiji	8 February 2008
186	South Sudan	29 September 2011
–	Kosovo	14 November 2011
–	State of Palestine	15 December 2011
187	Myanmar	19 December 2012
188	Trinidad and Tobago	8 May 2013
189	Monaco	5 May 2014
–	Cook Islands	13 October 2017

== Bilateral relations ==
Iceland's first embassy was established in Copenhagen in 1920. The second and third embassies were opened in London and Sweden in 1940. That same year, a consulate-general was installed in New York (a year later, an embassy was opened in Washington D.C.). The Icelandic foreign service grew slowly (both in terms of missions and staff) in the post-WWII period, but increased rapidly after the mid-1990s. The Icelandic foreign service is vastly smaller than those of its Nordic neighbors.

=== Africa ===
No formal diplomatic relations

Country	Diplomatic Relations Established	Notes
Burkina Faso	2001	Burkina Faso is accredited to Iceland by its embassy in Copenhagen, Denmark.
Kenya	2001	Iceland is accredited to Kenya from its embassy in Kampala, Uganda.; Kenya is accredited to Iceland from its embassy in Stockholm, Sweden.
Malawi	1989	Iceland has an embassy in Lilongwe; Iceland is accredited to Malawi through its High Commission in London
Mauritania	2004	Mauritania is accredited to Iceland by its embassy in Brussels, Belgium.; Iceland is represented in Mauritania by its Ministry of Foreign Affairs in Reykjavík.
Sierra Leone	2006	Iceland has an embassy in Freetown
Uganda	2004	Iceland has an embassy in Kampalay.; Uganda is accredited to Iceland from its embassy in Copenhagen, Denmark.

=== Americas ===
Country	Diplomatic Relations Established	Notes
Canada	1947	See Canada–Iceland relations: Canada has an embassy in Reykjavík.; Iceland has an embassy in Ottawa and a consulate-general in Winnipeg.
Dominica	2004	Both countries established diplomatic relations in 2004.; Iceland is represented in Dominica through its embassy in New York City, United States. Both countries have an agreement on cooperation on geothermal energy.
Mexico	24 March 1964	See Iceland–Mexico relations: Iceland is accredited to Mexico from its embassy in Washington D.C., United States and maintains honorary consulates in Campeche City and in Mexico City.; Mexico is accredited to Iceland from its embassy in Copenhagen, Denmark and maintains an honorary consulate in Reykjavík.
Paraguay	2004	Iceland is represented in Paraguay by its embassy in Washington, United States.; Paraguay is represented in Iceland by its embassy in London, United Kingdom.
Saint Vincent and the Grenadines	27 May 2004	Both countries established diplomatic relations on 27 May 2004.; Iceland is represented in Saint-Vincent-and-the-Grenadines by its Mission to the United Nations in New York City, United States.
Saint Kitts and Nevis	2004	Iceland is represented in Saint Kitts and Nevis by its Mission to the United Nations in New York City, United States.
United States	1 July 1941	See Iceland–United States relations Iceland and the U.S. are NATO allies. The United States prides itself on being the first country to recognize the regained independence of Iceland.: Iceland has an embassy in Washington, D.C.; United States has an embassy in Reykjavík.

=== Asia ===
No formal diplomatic relations

Country	Diplomatic Relations Established	Notes
China	1971	See China–Iceland relations: In May 1972, China assigned the first resident ambassador to Iceland.; In January 1995, Iceland set up its embassy in Beijing and assigned its first resident ambassador to China.; In December 1995, China resumed the practice of sending resident ambassadors to Iceland (between 1983 and 1995, the Chinese ambassador to Copenhagen, Denmark was also accredited to Iceland).; In April 2013 Iceland entered into a free trade agreement with China.; Iceland has an honorary consulate in Hong Kong. The honorary consulate is also accredited to Macao.
India	1972	See Iceland–India relations: India has an embassy in Reykjavík.; Iceland has an embassy in New Delhi and two consulates in Mumbai and Chennai.
Iran	1948	Iceland is accredited to Iran from its embassy in Oslo.; Iran is accredited to Iceland from its embassy in Oslo.
Israel	May 1948	See Iceland–Israel relations: Iceland is accredited to Israel directly from the Ministry of Foreign Affairs and maintains an honorary consulate in Tel Aviv.; Israel is accredited to Iceland from its embassy in Oslo, Norway and maintains an honorary consulate in Reykjavík.
Japan	8 December 1956	See Iceland–Japan relations: Both countries find common interest on the matter of whaling.; Iceland has an embassy in Tokyo and 3 honorary consulates in Kyoto, Nagano-shi, Tokyo.; Japan has an embassy in Reykjavík.; Japan Ministry of Foreign Affairs about relations with Iceland
Pakistan	1976	Pakistan maintain cordinal diplomatic relations with Iceland.
Palestine	2011	See Iceland–Palestine relations On 29 November 2011, the parliament of Iceland passed a resolution that authorized the government to officially recognize the state of Palestine within the 1967 borders. Iceland was the first (and, until 2024, only) Western European country to recognise the independence of Palestine. Full diplomatic relations exist between the two states. Iceland's representative to Palestine is a non-resident based at the Ministry for Foreign Affairs in Reykjavík, while Palestine's ambassador to Iceland is also a non-resident based in Oslo, Norway.
Philippines	24 February 1999	See Iceland–Philippines relations Iceland has its representation in the Philippines through its embassy in Tokyo, Japan, and the Philippines' ambassador in Oslo, Norway is also accredited to Iceland; although both countries established honorary consulates in Reykjavík and Makati, Metro Manila, respectively.
South Korea	10 October 1962	See Iceland–South Korea relations: The establishment of diplomatic relations between the Republic of Iceland and the Republic of Korea began on 10 October 1962.; The Republic of Iceland and the Republic of Korea relations are primarily based on cooperation over maritime issues such as whaling and bottom trawling and on bi-lateral trade in technology and fish products although there are various other ways in which the two countries interact.
Turkey	1957	See Iceland–Turkey relations: Turkey has an embassy in Reykjavík.; Iceland is accredited to Turkey from its embassy in Copenhagen, Denmark.; Both countries are full members of NATO.

=== Europe ===
Country	Diplomatic Relations Established	Notes
Albania	1976	See Albania–Iceland relations: Albania is accredited to Iceland from its embassy in Stockholm, Sweden.; Iceland is accredited to Albania from its embassy in Stockholm, Sweden and has an honorary consulate in Tirana.; Both countries are members of NATO and of Council of Europe.
Austria	1928	Iceland has an embassy in Vienna.; Iceland is accredited to Austria from its Ministry of Foreign Affairs in Reykjavík.; Austrian Ministry of Foreign Affairs: list of bilateral treaties with Iceland (in German only); See also: Austrians in Iceland and Icelandics in Austria
Belgium	1945	Belgium is represented in Iceland through its embassy in Oslo and an honorary consulate in Reykjavík.; Iceland has an embassy in Brussels.; Both countries are full members of NATO.
Cyprus	1979	Cyprus is represented in Iceland by its embassy in Copenhagen, Denmark.; Iceland is represented in Cyprus by its embassy in Stockholm, Sweden.
Czech Republic	1993-01-01	See Czech Republic–Iceland relations: The Czech Republic is represented in Iceland through an honorary consulate in Reykjavík.; Iceland is represented in the Czech Republic through its embassy in Vienna (Austria) and through an honorary consulate in Prague.; Both countries are full members of NATO.
Denmark	1918	See Denmark–Iceland relations Iceland was a part of the Kingdom of Denmark from 1814 to 1918 and a separate kingdom in a personal union with Denmark until 1944, when Iceland declared independence.: Denmark has an embassy in Reykjavík.; Iceland has an embassy in Copenhagen and consulates-general in the Danish territories of Nuuk, Greenland and in Tórshavn, Faroe Islands.; Both countries are full members of NATO.
Estonia	30 January 1922	See Estonia–Iceland relations: Iceland was the first country to re-recognized Estonia's independence on 22 August 1991.; Estonia is accredited to Iceland through its embassy in Oslo, Norway and maintains an honorary consulate in Reykjavík.; Iceland is accredited to Estonia from its embassy in Helsinki, Finland.; Both countries are full members of NATO, of the Council of Europe and of the Council of the Baltic Sea States.; Estonia and Iceland have a joint embassy in Beijing, China.
Finland	1947	See Finland–Iceland relations: Finland has an embassy in Reykjavík.; Iceland has an embassy in Helsinki.; Both countries are full members of the Council of Europe and NATO.; Finland is a member of the European Union. Iceland is not a member of the European Union.
France	1945	See France–Iceland relations: France has an embassy in Reykjavík.; Iceland has an embassy in Paris.; Both countries are full members of NATO.
Germany	1952	See Germany–Iceland relations: Iceland has an embassy in Berlin.; Germany has an embassy in Reykjavík.; Both countries are NATO members.; See also: Germans in Iceland and Icelandics in Germany
Greece	1958	See Greece–Iceland relations: Greece is represented in Iceland through its embassy in Oslo (Norway) and through an honorary consulate in Reykjavík. Iceland is represented in Greece through its embassy in Oslo (Norway) and through an honorary consulate in Athens.; Both countries are full members of NATO.
Hungary	1955	Hungary is represented in Iceland by its embassy in Oslo, Norway.; Iceland is represented in Hungary by its embassy in Vienna, Austria.; Both countries are full members of NATO.
Ireland	11 March 1948	See Iceland–Ireland relations: Iceland is represented in Ireland through its embassy in London (United Kingdom) and through an honorary consulate in Dublin.; Ireland is represented in Iceland through its embassy in Copenhagen (Denmark) and through an honorary consulate in Garðabær.; Both countries are full members of Council of Europe.
Italy	1945	Iceland has an embassy in Rome.; Italy is represented in Iceland through its embassy in Oslo (Norway) and an honorary consulate in Reykjavík.; Both countries are full members of the Council of Europe, of NATO and of Organisation for Economic Co-operation and Development.
Latvia	1991-08-22	See Iceland–Latvia relations: Iceland was the first country to recognise the independence of Latvia in August 1991.; Iceland is represented in Latvia through its embassy in Helsinki (Finland).; Latvia is represented in Iceland through its embassy in Oslo (Norway) and an honorary consulate in Reykjavík.; Both countries are full members of NATO.
Lithuania	1991-08-05	See Iceland–Lithuania relations: Iceland was the first country to recognise the independence of Lithuania in February 1991.; Iceland is represented in Lithuania through its embassy in Helsinki (Finland).; Lithuania is represented in Iceland through its embassy in Copenhagen (Denmark) and 2 honorary consulates (in Mosfellsbær and Reykjavík).; Both countries are full members of the Council of the Baltic Sea States, of NATO, and of the Council of Europe. There was 1.652 Lithuanians living in Iceland 2015.; Lithuanian Ministry of Foreign Affairs: list of bilateral treaties with Iceland (in Lithuanian only)
Netherlands	1946	Iceland is represented in the Netherlands by its embassy in Oslo, Norway.; The Netherlands is represented in Iceland by its embassy in Brussels, Belgium.; See also: Dutchs in Iceland and Icelandics in the Netherlands; Both countries are full members of NATO.
North Macedonia	1993	Iceland is represented in North Macedonia through its embassy in Vienna, Austria.; North Macedonia is represented in Iceland through its embassy in London, England, and an honorary consulate in Reykjavík.; Both countries are full members of NATO.
Norway	1940	See Iceland–Norway relations: Iceland has an embassy in Oslo.; Norway has an embassy in Reykjavík.; Both countries are full members of NATO.
Poland	January 1946	See Iceland–Poland relations: Iceland has an embassy in Warsaw.; Poland has an embassy in Reykjavík.; Both countries are full members of NATO.
Russia	1943	See Iceland–Russia relations: Iceland is accredited to Russia from its Ministry of Foreign Affairs in Reykjavík and maintains an honorary consulate in Saint Petersburg.; Russia has an embassy in Reykjavík.; Both countries have close ties in financing, which has strengthened the relations between the two. Iceland also called Russia as its "new friend" after having been turned down by its traditional allies for an emergency loan to boost the balance sheet of its second largest commercial bank.; On August 1, 2023, Iceland suspended its embassy operations in Moscow.
Serbia	2000	Both countries have established diplomatic relations in 2000.; A number of bilateral agreements have been concluded and are in force between both countries.
Spain	1949	See Iceland–Spain relations: Iceland has an embassy in Madrid.; Spain is accredited to Iceland from its embassy in Oslo, Norway.; Both countries are full members of NATO.
Sweden	1940	See Iceland–Sweden relations: The governments of Iceland and Sweden signed on 23 March 1921 a joint declaration for the protection of trade marks.; Iceland has an embassy in Stockholm.; Sweden has an embassy in Reykjavík.; Both countries are full members of the Council of Europe and NATO.
Switzerland	1947	Iceland has an embassy in Geneva (which is accredited to Switzerland and to the United Nations).; Switzerland is represented in Iceland through its embassy in Oslo and through an honorary consulate in Reykjavík; Both countries are members of Council of Europe and the European Free Trade Association.; See also: Swisses in Iceland and Icelandics in Switzerland
Ukraine	1992	See Iceland–Ukraine relations: Iceland is represented in Ukraine through its embassy in Warsaw (Poland).; Ukraine is represented in Iceland through its embassy in Helsinki (Finland) and through an honorary consulate in Reykjavík.; Both countries are full members of the Council of Europe.
United Kingdom	1940	See Iceland–United Kingdom relations Iceland established diplomatic relations with the United Kingdom on 8 May 1940.: Iceland maintains an embassy in London.; The United Kingdom is accredited to Iceland through its embassy in Reykjavík.; The UK occupied Iceland from 10 May 1940 until July 1941, when the United States assumed responsibility of the country. The two countries have a sovereignty dispute over the Rockall Bank. Both countries share common membership of the Atlantic co-operation pact, Council of Europe, Joint Expeditionary Force, NATO, OECD, OSCE, and the World Trade Organization. Bilaterally the two countries have a free trade agreement.

=== Oceania ===
Country	Diplomatic Relations Established	Notes
Australia	17 April 1984	See Australia–Iceland relations: Australia is accredited to Iceland from its embassy in Copenhagen, Denmark.; Iceland is accredited to Australia from its embassy in Beijing, China.
New Zealand	1988	Iceland is accredited to New Zealand from its embassy in Beijing, China and maintains honorary consulates in Auckland and Nelson.; New Zealand is accredited to Iceland from its embassy in The Hague, Netherlands.

== See also ==
- List of diplomatic missions in Iceland
- List of diplomatic missions of Iceland
- Iceland–European Union relations
- Ministry for Foreign Affairs (Iceland)
- Iceland - Establishment of Diplomatic Relations
- Visa policy of Iceland
