= Greece–Iceland relations =

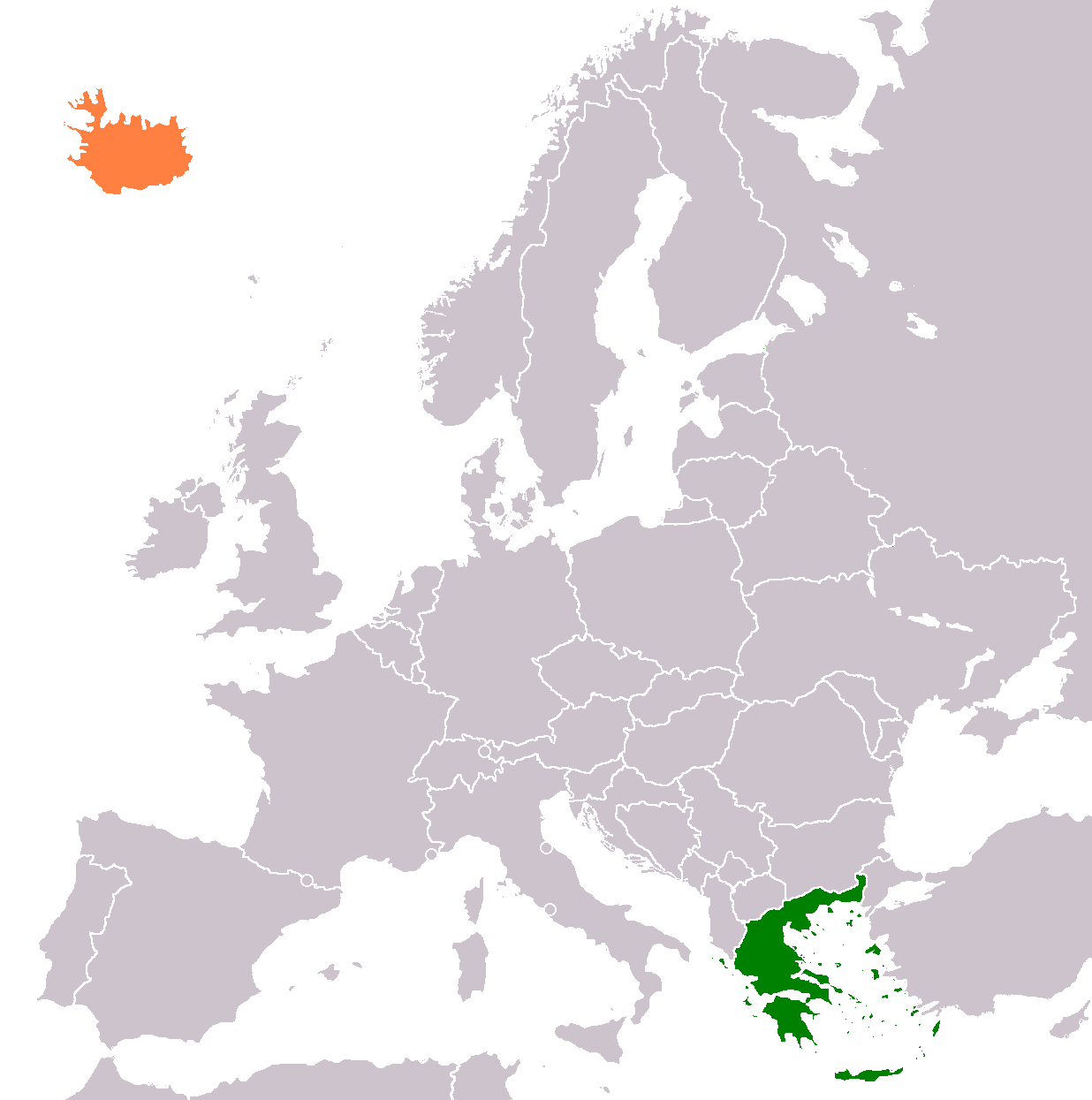
- Greece: Iceland

Greece–Iceland relations are foreign, economic and cultural relations between Greece and Iceland. Greece is represented in Iceland through its embassy in Oslo, Norway and through an honorary consulate in Reykjavík. Iceland is represented in Greece through its embassy in Oslo, Norway and through an honorary consulate in Athens. They have been firm allies for over 60 years, and have reaffirmed their ties recently at the highest levels of contacts. Both nations are members of NATO, OSCE, COE, and the UN.

== Historical context ==
Both nations are full members of the OECD, and they have been since 1961.

== Recent ties ==
The President of Iceland, Ólafur Ragnar Grímsson, visited Athens in September 2001, where he met with President Kostis Stephanopoulos. In a return visit in early July 2006, the new President of Greece, Karolos Papoulias, came to Iceland and met with President Ólafur. Among other subjects, they discussed strengthening the relations between Greece and Iceland, particularly in sectors such as telecommunications, pharmaceutical, and banking, in addition to the natural fishery products imported from Iceland to Greece. Papoulias also met in Reykjavík with the Prime Minister of Iceland Geir Haarde and discussed subjects such as joint cooperation in the economic sector in the Balkans. During this trip the Foreign Minister of Greece Theodoros Kassimis and the Foreign Minister of Iceland Valgerður Sverrisdóttir signed an agreement on the Avoidance of Double Taxation.

On August 28, 2007, Greece and Iceland reaffirmed their long-standing ties at an official meeting between Greek Prime Minister Costas Karamanlis and Icelandic Prime Minister Geir Haarde, "who was on a working visit to Greece." Karamanlis was reported to have said:

relations between the two countries were exceptional, while their cooperation was excellent at both bilateral level and in international organisations, but added that many opportunities for furthering cooperation existed in the economy, in investments and in the tourism sector.

The Greek Prime Minister is interested in Iceland's "many energy reserves." He specifically thanked "Haarde for Iceland’s backing of Greece on the Macedonia naming dispute."

== Trade and investment ==
In 2008, Iceland directly exported goods worth ISK 288.7 million to Greece and imported goods worth ISK 271.6 million, or about US$3.5 million in both directions at mid-2008 rates.

In 2005, Thor Bjorgolfsson was involved in a controversial attempt to purchase 16% of the shares of Forthnet, a Greek company involved in the Telecommunications and Internet sectors.

== See also ==
- Foreign relations of Greece
- Foreign relations of Iceland
- Iceland-EU relations
- NATO-EU relations
