= Iceland–Philippines relations =

- Iceland: Philippines

Iceland–Philippines relations refers to the bilateral relations of Iceland and the Philippines. Diplomatic ties between the two countries formally established on 24 February 1999. Iceland has its accreditation to the Philippines through its embassy in Tokyo, Japan, and the Philippines' ambassador to Oslo, Norway has also its jurisdiction in Iceland. Both countries established honorary consulates in Reykjavík and Makati, Metro Manila, respectively.

== Economic relations ==
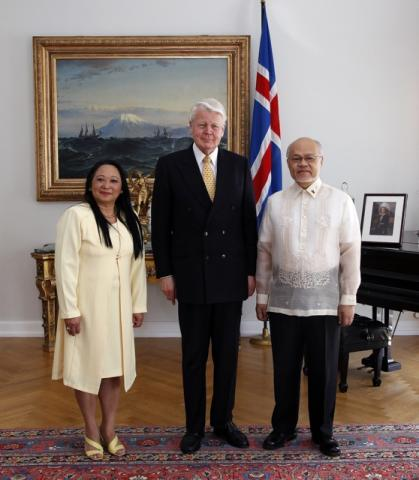
The President of Iceland, Ólafur Ragnar Grímsson (center), with Honorary Consul Priscilla Zanoria and non-resident Philippine Ambassador Bayani Mercado in Bessastaðir, 2012.

The Philippines and Iceland, together with Norway and Denmark have been steady partners in the areas of maritime, mining, renewable energy, fishing and medical services among others. President of Iceland Ólafur Ragnar Grímsson expressed hopes for stronger and closer relations between the Philippines and Iceland. The then Philippine Ambassador Elizabeth Buensuceso and Foreign Minister Össur Skarphéðinsson in 2009 discussed prospects for further cooperation, particularly in the fisheries and geothermal sector. Furthermore, she expressed her concerns about restrictive remittance and currency exchange policies currently imposed by the Central Bank of Iceland which affects Filipino workers in sending money back in their home country, suggesting alternatives.

At the Asia–Europe Meeting held in Vientiane, Laos on 2012, Philippine President Benigno Aquino III and the then President of the Swiss Confederation Eveline Widmer-Schlumpf discussed Switzerland's proposal for a free trade agreement with the European Free Trade Area (EFTA) and affirmed the potential and viability of such a mechanism to enhance economic relations between the Philippines and the EFTA of which Iceland is part of the said multilateral organization. Iceland is the 171st largest trading partner of the Philippines with US$85,996 worth of exports.

Geothermal developer Envent Holding Philippines, Inc., a joint venture of Geysir Green Energy and Reykjavík Energy Invest of Iceland, entered into a Public-Private Partnership agreement in the establishment of the 49-megawatt Biliran geothermal facility in the Visayas which costs approximately US$150 million; however due to the Eurozone and Icelandic financial crisis, Orka Energy Holdings Ehf took over its financial commitments and obligations to the project and the Philippine Government, through the Department of Energy, expects that the drilling of exploration wells will commence sometime in 2013. The said project will benefit five electric cooperatives in Biliran and Leyte islands, and about 1.9 million residents. Iceland and the Philippines are two of the largest producers of geothermal energy for power generation in the world, ranking 7th and 2nd, respectively.

== Labor and migration ==
=== Labor ===
At the time Honorary Consulate of the Philippines in Reykjavík was under the jurisdiction of the embassy in London, United Kingdom, the Labor Office Attaché entered into an agreement in 2007 with regards to the newly implemented labor immigration policies in Iceland. It tackles about the issuance of work/residence permits and the non-requirement of Icelandic language in obtaining visas, and other labor standards that benefits both Filipinos seeking employment and the Icelandic economy, as well as addressing the shortage of Icelandic workforce.

=== Migration ===
There are currently 2,241 Filipinos, of which 1,240 are Icelandic citizens, residing in Iceland as of 2021. Filipinos are the largest Asian population and the fifth largest among other foreign nationalities in the country to date. Most Filipinos tend to settle in the Capital Region, however there are certain Filipinos that reside in the rural areas such as Kirkjubæjarklaustur. On the other hand, there are 17 registered persons with Icelandic citizenship who are residing in the Philippines as per 2020 Census.

The Filipino migration to Iceland from the past 20 years has primarily been caused by the economic boom. Iceland, being a small country with less than half a million people, needed to outsource in order to satisfy its demands in production, services, and construction. This has opened doors for many Filipinos, coming from a developing country. On the other hand, it was not always work that encouraged Filipinos to move to Iceland. Aside from work, one key reason for migrating to Iceland is family reunification.

== Philippine drug war ==
Iceland was not supportive of the Philippine drug war, President Rodrigo Duterte's campaign against illegal drugs in his country. Iceland is critical of the killings linked to the campaign.

Iceland has led calls for an independent body to probe on the killings at the United Nations Human Rights Council at least in three occasions in 2017, 2018 and 2019.

The Philippines government was seriously considering cutting diplomatic relations with Iceland for initiating the resolution, which they described as grotesquely one-sided, outrageously narrow, and maliciously partisan and shown how the Western powers are scornful of sovereign exercise of protecting Filipino people from the scourge of prohibited drugs.

== Resident diplomatic missions ==
- Iceland is accredited to the Philippines from its embassy in Tokyo, Japan.
- the Philippines is accredited to Iceland from its embassy in Oslo, Norway.

== See also ==
- Foreign relations of Iceland
- Foreign relations of the Philippines
