= Albania–Iceland relations =

- Albania: Iceland

Albania–Iceland relations are the bilateral relations between Albania and Iceland. Both countries are full members of the Council of Europe, Organization for Security and Co-operation in Europe and NATO.

== History ==
From 1967 to 1991, an organization called Menningartengsl Albaníu og Íslands (English: Cultural Relations of Albania and Iceland ), or MAÍ for short, operated in Iceland with the goal of strengthening the cultural links between Iceland and Albania, in addition to presenting to Iceland the ideas that prevailed in Albania at that time. In 1974, they issued a statement, demanding that the Icelandic government took up diplomatic releations with Albania.

Diplomatic relations between the countries were finally established on 9 April 1976.

In 2008, Iceland supported Albania's bid to join NATO. The same year, Albania supported Iceland's bid for a seat in the UN Security Council.

=== Asylum seekers ===
In 2016, 28% of all asylum seekers in Iceland came from Albania, the highest proportion of Albanian asylum seekers in countries within the European Economic Area.

== High level visits ==
=== High-level visits from Albania to Iceland ===
In October 2007, prime minister Sali Berisha visited Iceland and met with prime minister Geir H. Haarde where they discussed bilateral relations between the states, possible cooperation on energy production and the political status of Kosovo.

In February 2009, foreign minister Lulzim Basha visited Iceland and met with foreign minister Össur Skarphéðinsson.

In May 2023, prime minister Edi Rama travelled to Reykjavík and attended the 4th Council of Europe summit.

=== High-level visits from Iceland to Albania ===
In August 2008, prime minister Geir H. Haarde visited prime minister Sali Berisha in Albania where they discussed bilateral relations between the states, regional issues and international affairs, including ways to increase trade and investment, the situation and prospects of the western Balkans and the consequences of Russia's invasion of Georgia. Geir also met with Bamir Topi, the president of Albania, and Jozefina Topalli, the president of the Albanian parliament. It was the first time that an Icelandic minister visited Albania in official capacity.

In May 2025, prime minister Kristrún Frostadóttir attended the 6th European Political Community Summit in Tirana.

== Resident diplomatic missions ==
- Albania is accredited to Iceland from its embassy in Stockholm, Sweden.
- Iceland is accredited to Albania from its embassy in Stockholm, Sweden and has an honorary consulate in Tirana.

== See also ==
- Foreign relations of Albania
- Foreign relations of Iceland
