= Estonia–Iceland relations =

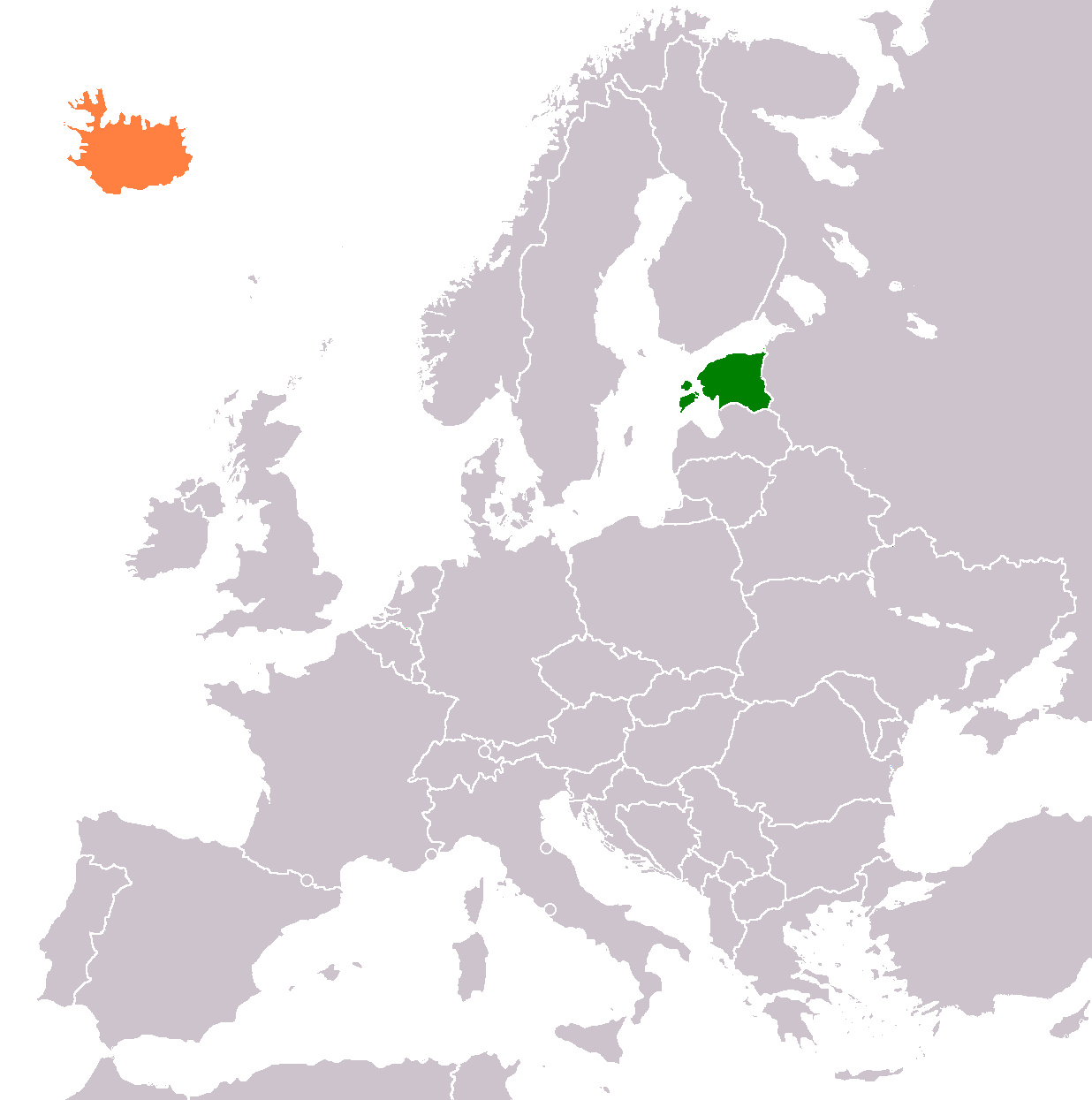
- Estonia: Iceland

Estonia–Iceland relations are the bilateral relations between Estonia and Iceland. Estonia is represented in Iceland through its embassy in Oslo (Norway) and an honorary consulate in Reykjavík. Iceland is represented in Estonia through its embassy in Helsinki (Finland).

Both countries are full members of NATO, the Joint Expeditionary Force, the Council of Europe, and the Council of the Baltic Sea States.

== History ==
Iceland (then a kingdom in personal union with Denmark) recognized Estonia de iure on 30 January 1922.

The Estonian honorary consulate in Reykjavik operated until 1958, when it was closed at the request of the Soviet Union.

Iceland was the first country to re-recognize Estonia's independence on 22 August 1991. According to Lennart Meri "Iceland has a great role in changing the world in 1991 as an icebreaker, because Iceland reminded everyone of lost values". Both countries established diplomatic relations on 26 August 1991.

== High level visits ==
=== High-level visits from Estonia to Iceland ===
In September 1999, president Lennart Meri made a state visit to Iceland.

In 2010, president Toomas Hendrik Ilves and his wife Evelin Ilves made a state visit to Iceland.

In May 2018, prime minister Jüri Ratas visited Iceland and met with prime minister Katrín Jakobsdóttir and president Guðni Th. Jóhannesson.

=== High-level visits from Iceland to Estonia ===
In June 1998, president Ólafur Ragnar Grímsson and his wife Guðrún Katrín Þorbergsdóttir made a state visit to Estonia along with foreign minister Halldór Ásgrímsson.

In June 2018, president Guðni Th. Jóhannesson and first lady Eliza Reid visited Estonia.

In August 2021, the speaker of the Icelandic Parliament, Steingrímur J. Sigfússon, was an honor guest at Estonia's 30th independence anniversary.

In 2026, from 19-21 August The Icelandic head of state, Halla Tómasdóttir visited Estonia for the 35th anniversary of the restoration of Estonia's independence.

== Resident diplomatic missions ==
- Estonia is accredited to Iceland from its embassy in Oslo, Norway.
- Iceland is accredited to Estonia from its embassy in Helsinki, Finland.

== See also ==
- Foreign relations of Estonia
- Foreign relations of Iceland
