= Australia–Iceland relations =

- Australia: Iceland

Australia–Iceland relations are the bilateral relations between Australia and Iceland. Both countries share common membership of the International Criminal Court and OECD.

== Overview ==
Australia and Iceland established diplomatic relations on 17 April 1984. Australia and Iceland have friendly and warm diplomatic relations, although there is disagreement between the two countries over whaling. Iceland rejoined the Whaling Union in 2002 after withdrawing in 1992. According to the 2016 census, there are at least 1,100 people of Icelandic descent living in Australia.

In 2008 , Iceland, Australia, and the United States signed a memorandum of understanding regarding future cooperation on geothermal technology.

== Resident diplomatic missions ==
- Australia is accredited to Iceland from its embassy in Copenhagen, Denmark.
- Iceland is accredited to Australia from its embassy in Beijing, China. It is represented in Australia at the consular level through two consulates it maintains in the country's two largest cities: Sydney, and Melbourne.

== See also ==
- Foreign relations of Australia
- Foreign relations of Iceland
