= Finland–Iceland relations =

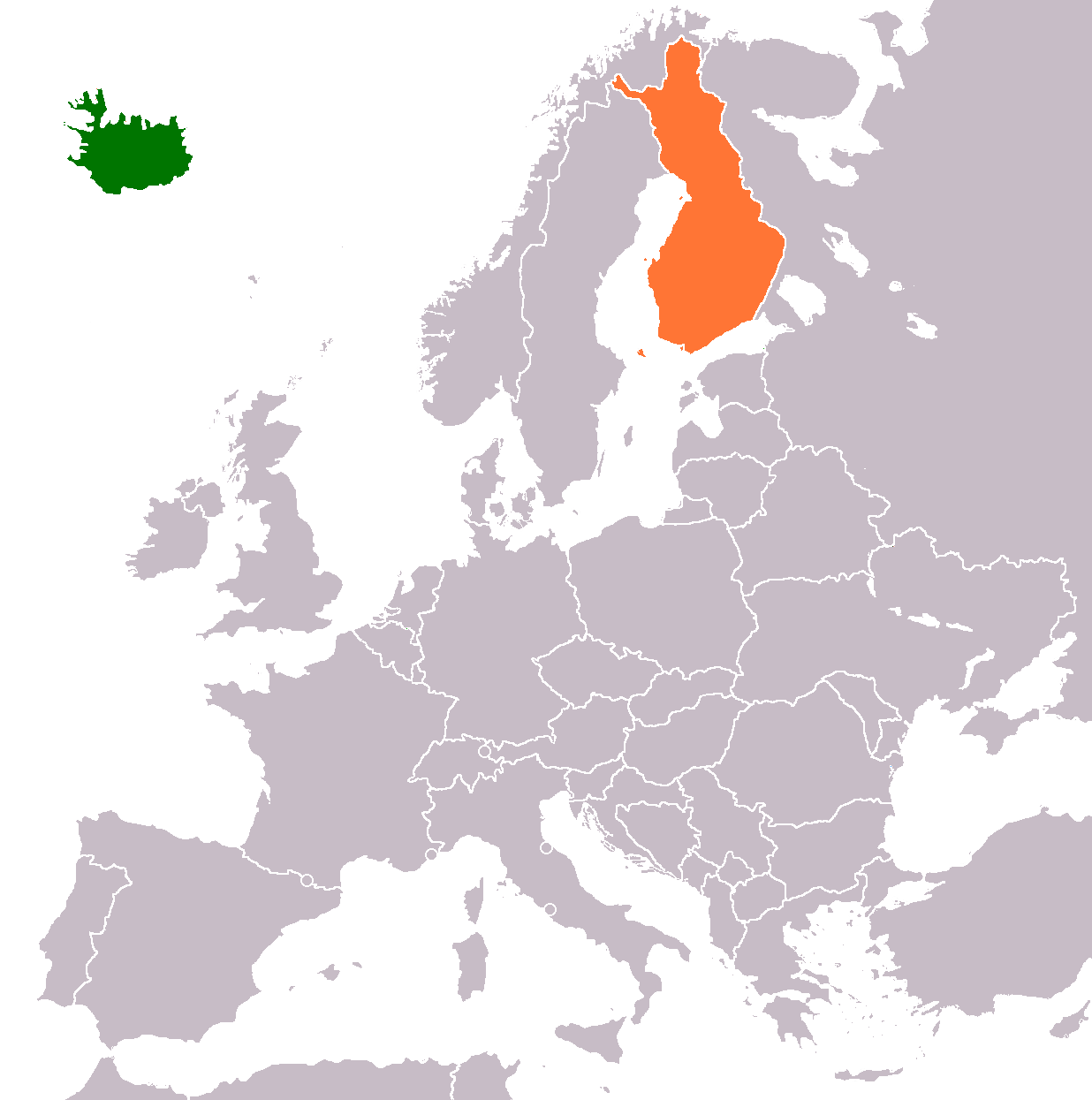
- Iceland: Finland

Finland–Iceland relations (Finnish: Suomen ja Islannin suhteet; Icelandic: Finnsk-íslensk samskipti) are foreign relations between Finland and Iceland. Both nations are mutual members of the Arctic Council, Council of the Baltic Sea States, Council of Europe, Nordic-Baltic Eight, Nordic Council, Organisation for Economic Co-operation and Development, NATO, Joint Expeditionary Force and the United Nations.

== History ==
Both Finland and Iceland were united as one nation under the Kalmar Union from 1397 - 1523. In December 1917, Finland obtained its independence from Russia and Iceland obtained its independence from Denmark in June 1944. Both nations officially established diplomatic relations on 15 August 1947. Initially, Finland maintained its relations with Iceland from its embassy in Oslo, Norway, while Iceland maintained relations with Finland from its embassy in Stockholm, Sweden. Finland opened its resident embassy in Reykjavík in 1982. Iceland opened its embassy in Helsinki in 1997.

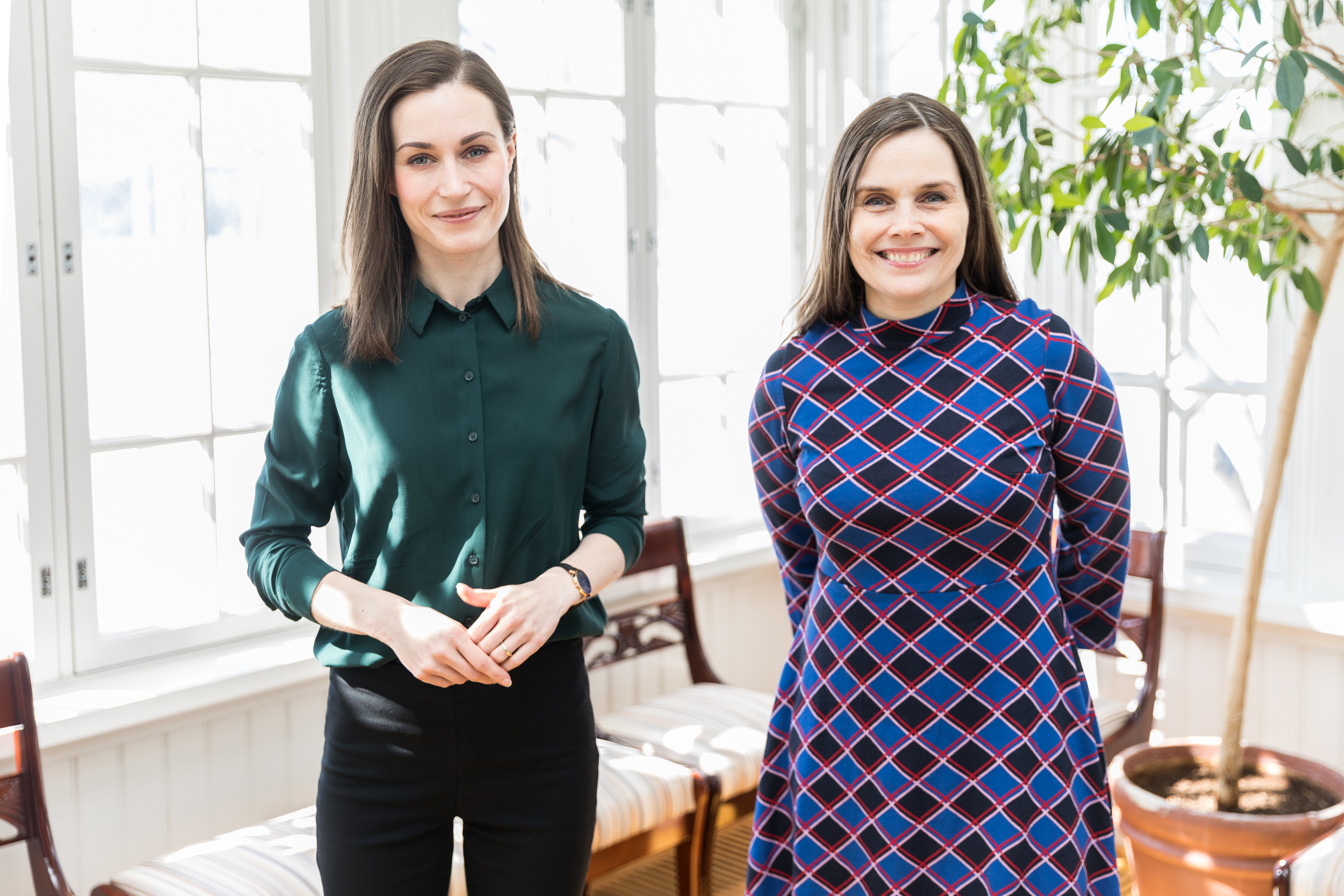
Prime Minister Sanna Marin met Iceland's Prime Minister Katrín Jakobsdóttir in spring 2022

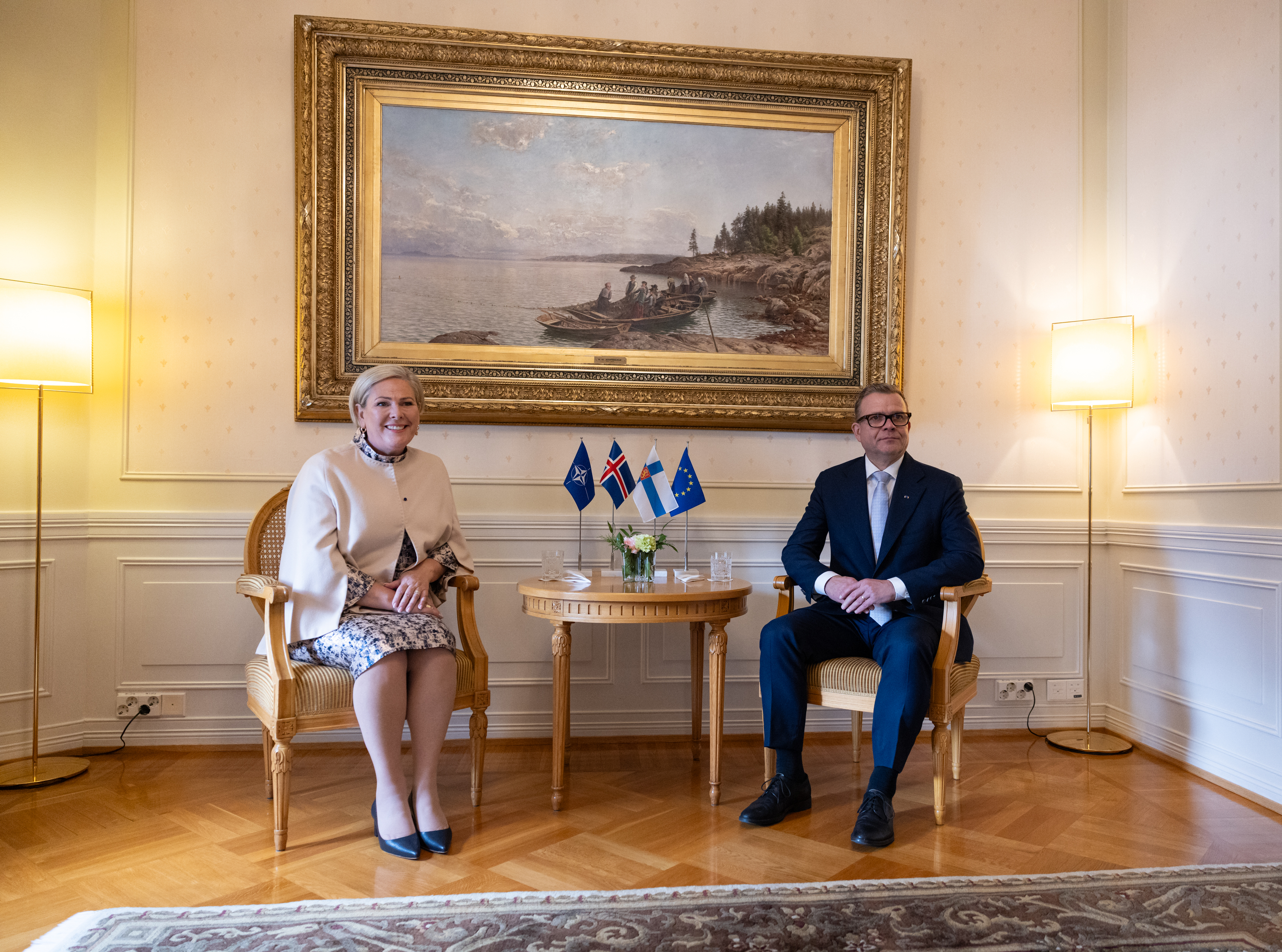
Prime Minister Petteri Orpo and President of Iceland Halla Tómasdóttir in 2025

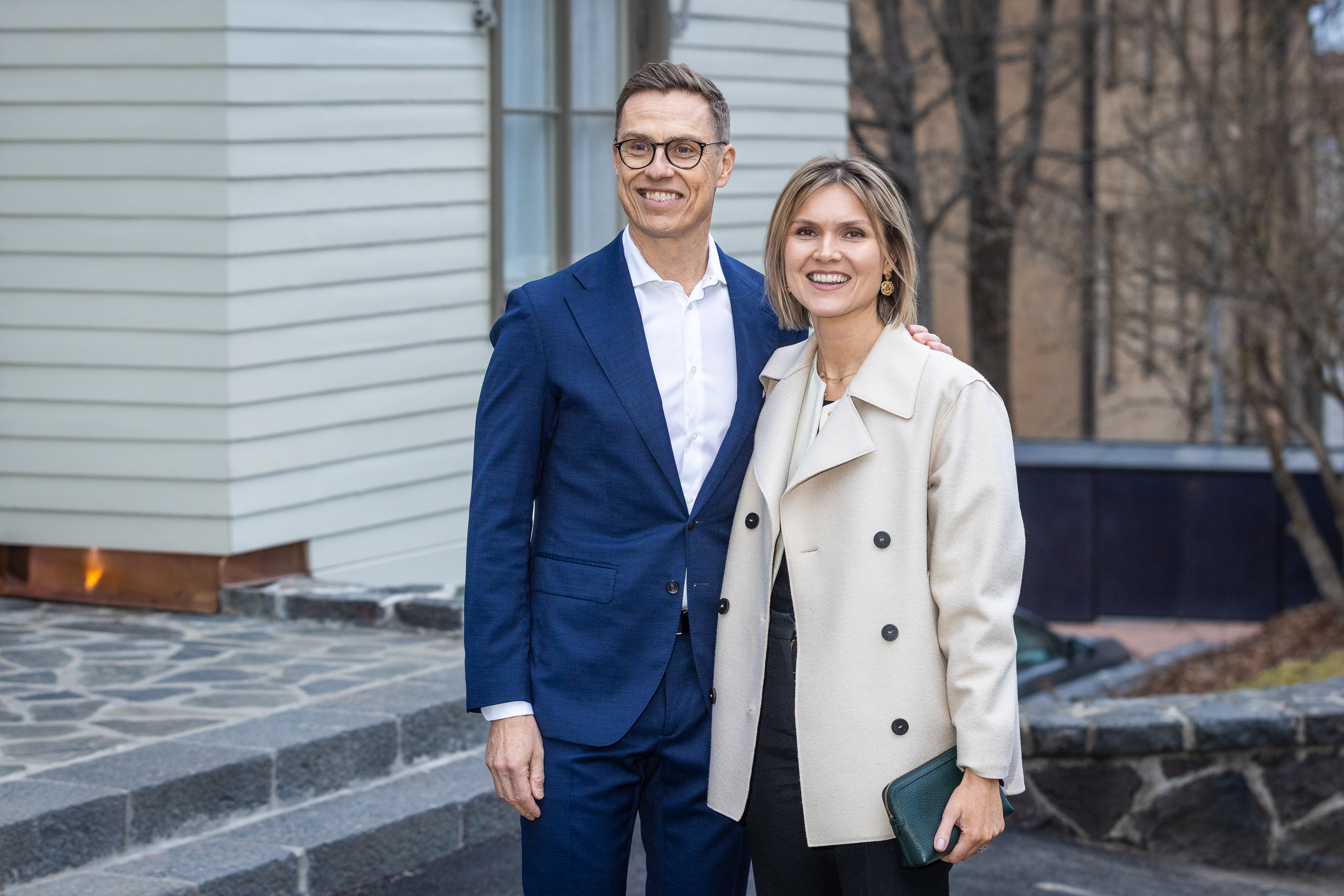
President Alexander Stubb with Iceland's Prime Minister Kristrún Frostadóttir in 2026

== Trade ==
Iceland, as a member of the European Free Trade Association has unrestricted access to the European Union market (which includes Finland). In 2015, total trade between Iceland and the EU totaled 5.7 billion euros.

== Resident diplomatic missions ==
- Finland has an embassy in Reykjavík.
- Iceland has an embassy in Helsinki.
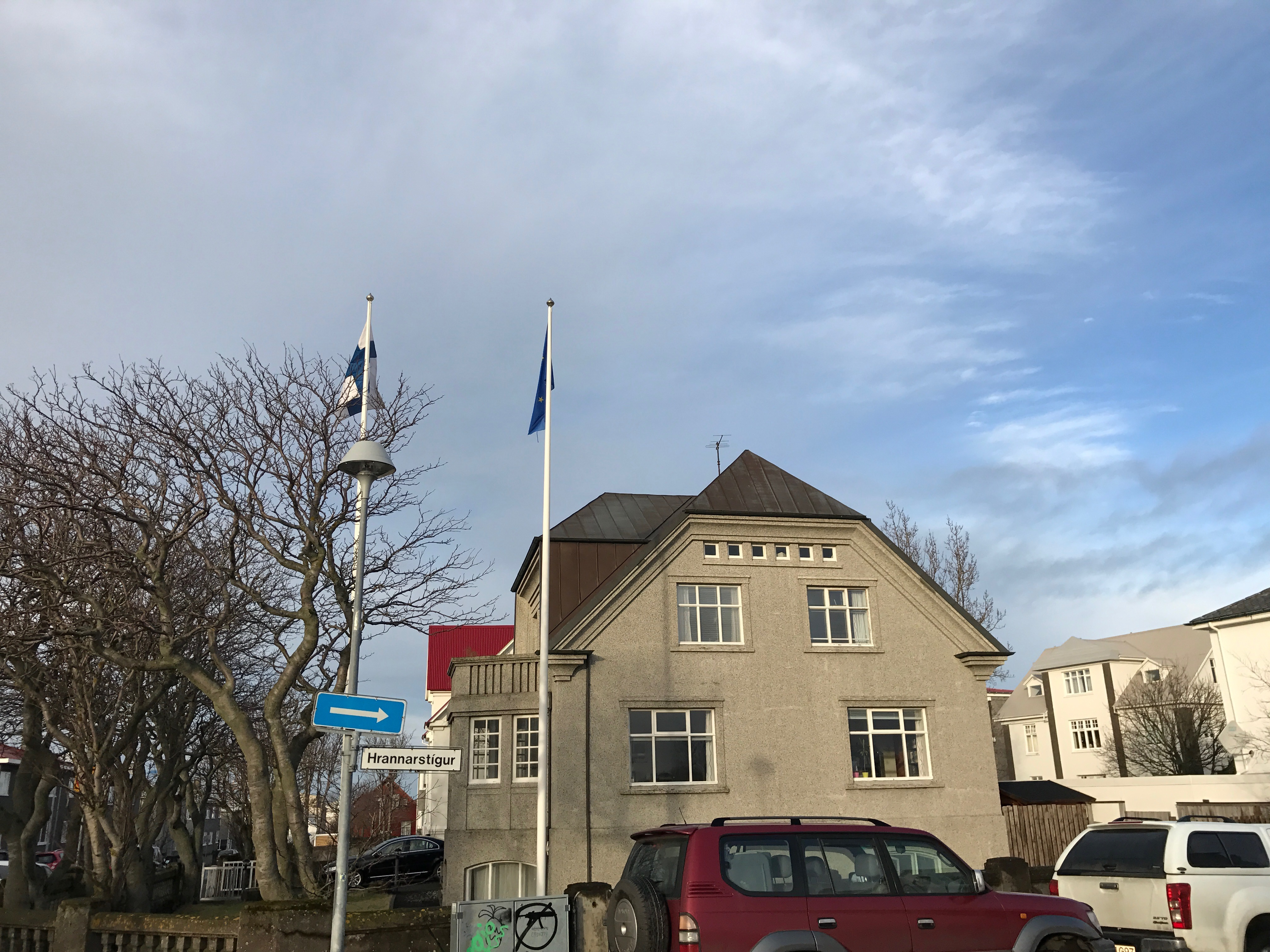
Embassy of Finland in Reykjavík

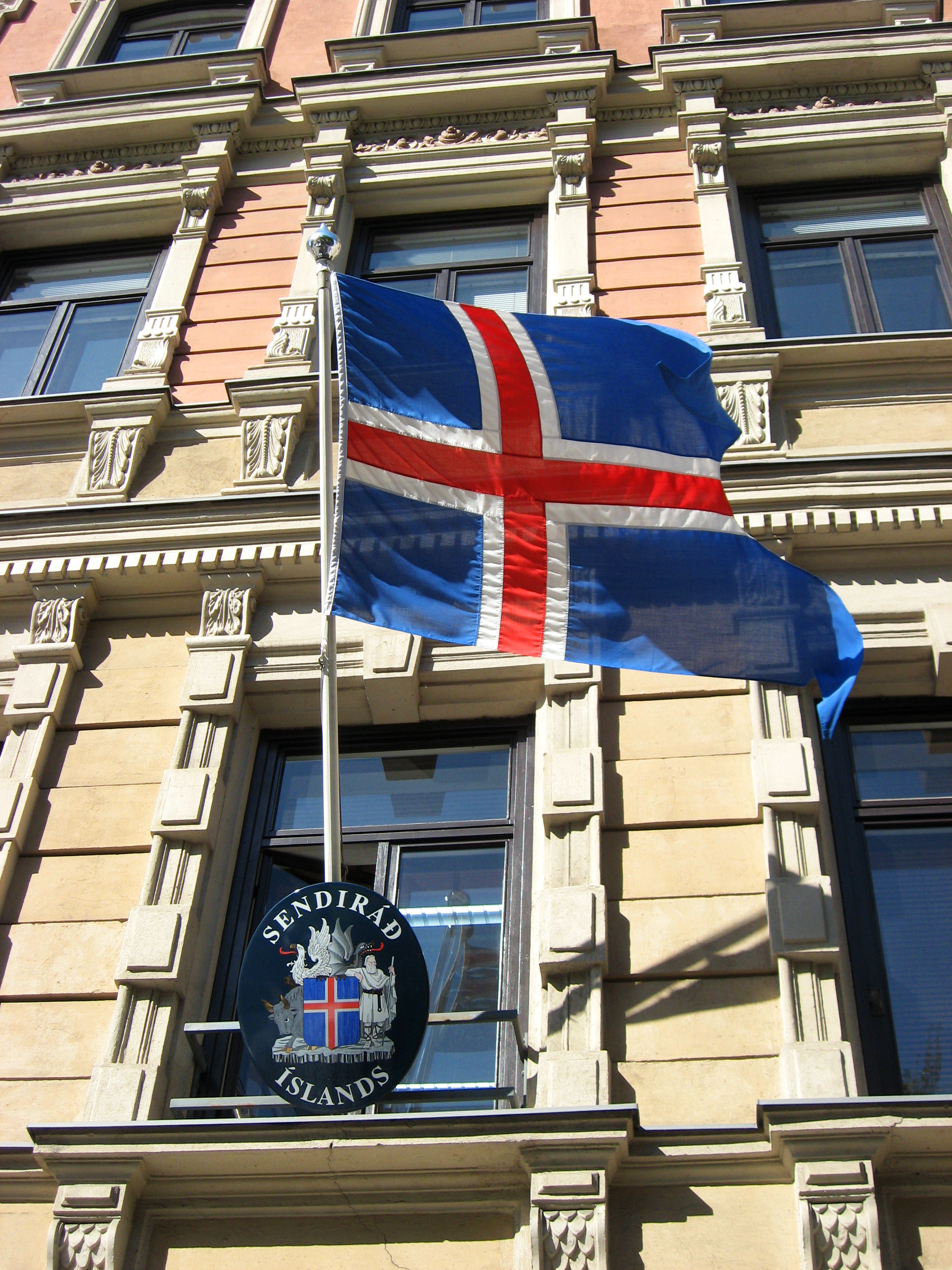
Embassy of Iceland in Helsinki

== See also ==
- Foreign relations of Finland
- Foreign relations of Iceland
- Iceland-EU relations
- NATO-EU relations
- Nordic Passport Union
- Scandinavia
