= Iceland–Russia relations =

- Iceland: Russia

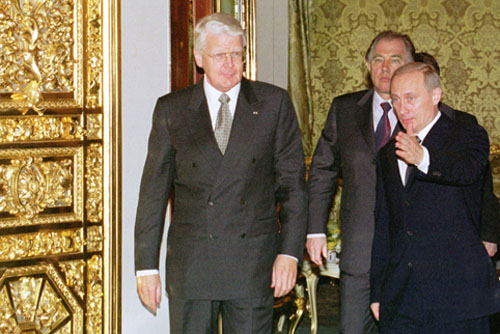
Ólafur Ragnar Grímsson and Halldór Ásgrímsson with Vladimir Putin at the Kremlin on April 10, 2002

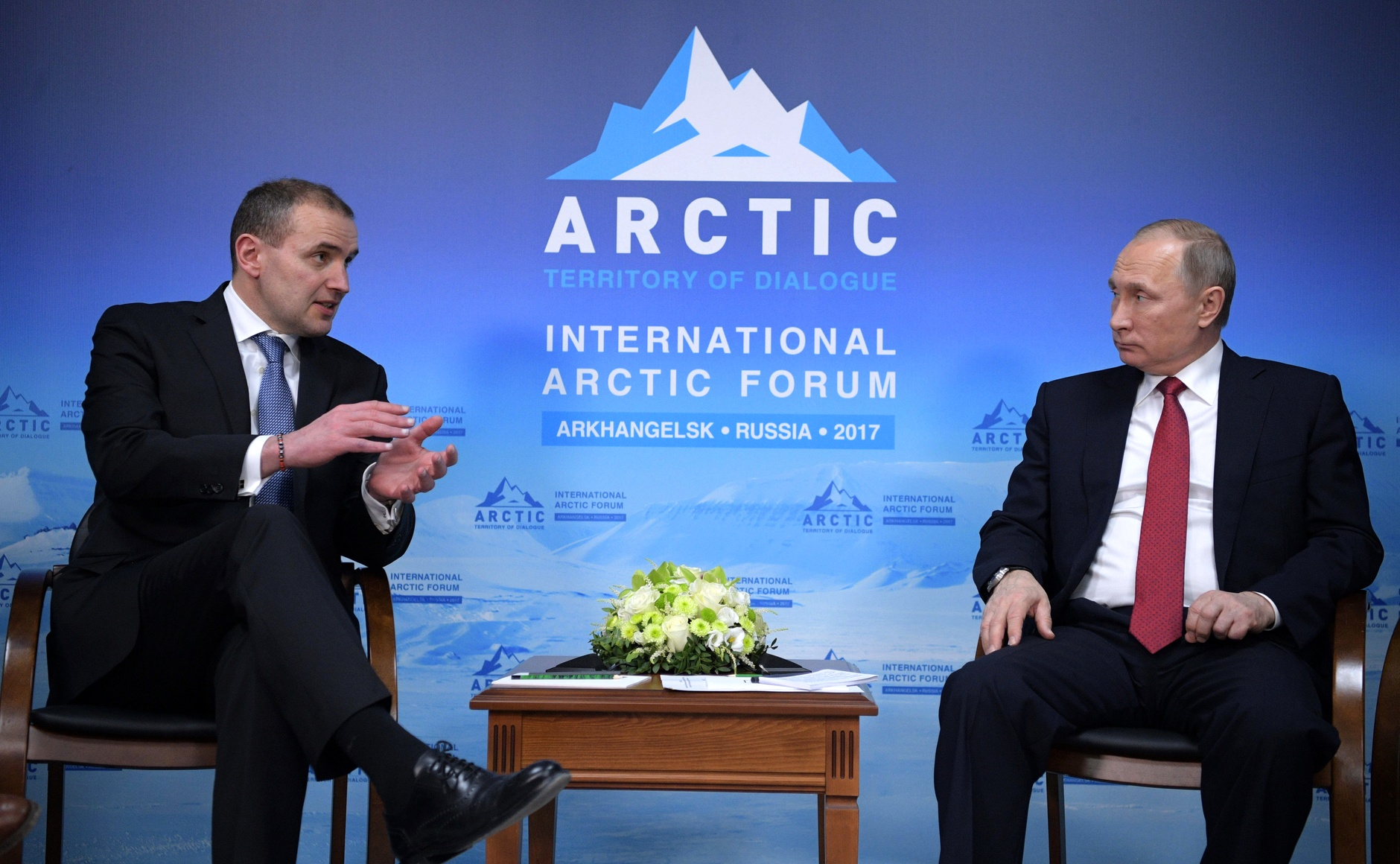
Guðni Th. Jóhannesson with Vladimir Putin at the International Arctic Forum in Arkhangelsk on March 30, 2017

Iceland–Russia relations are the relations between the two countries, Iceland and Russia. Russia has an embassy in Reykjavík. Iceland had an embassy in Moscow, and two honorary consulates in Murmansk and Saint Petersburg. Relations between Iceland and Russia have floundered in recent years due to the Russian invasion of Ukraine and the poisoning of Sergei Skripal, and on June 9, 2023, Iceland announced it would be suspending operations at its embassy in Moscow.

== History ==
=== 1926–1991 ===
The Kingdom of Iceland recognized the Soviet Union on June 22, 1926. In 1927, the governments of both countries exchanged notes about commercial relations, granting each other favorable trade conditions. Direct diplomatic relations between the Soviet Union and Iceland were established on October 4, 1943. In December 1955 the missions in Moscow and Reykjavik were upgraded to embassies. From 1975 to 1991 a trade representative of USSR was in Iceland.

The intersection of the interests of the Soviet Union and Iceland fishery began after World War II, so that already in 1949, to the shores of Iceland was sent for fish Soviet expedition of four vessels. The Soviet scientists have made a great contribution to the study of Iceland. In 1971–1973, Vladimir Belousov, a Soviet Earth scientist, worked in the island complex geodynamic Soviet expedition in the "Geodynamic Project". The first geological map of Iceland was drawn up on the results of operations. At the same time the study was carried out of the seabed in waters surrounding the island.

=== 1991–present ===
From 1991 to 1995, Russia had a trade representative in Iceland. In 1997, the first Russian-Icelandic dictionary was published by Helgi Haraldsson.

From April 18, 2002, to April 24, 2002, then President of Iceland Ólafur Ragnar Grímsson made an official visit to Russia. Grimsson visited Saint-Petersburg, Moscow, Novgorod and Salekhard, meeting with Russian president Vladimir Putin and then Russian Prime Minister Mikhail Kasyanov.

The two countries used to have close ties in financing, which has strengthened the relations between the two. In 2008 Prime Minister Geir Haarde has sent a delegation to Russia to negotiate a £3bn (€4bn) capital injection into the country's finances, after the country's traditional Western allies refused to help the collapsing banking system. The loan was later renegotiated to $500 million after Iceland managed to secure loans from Scandinavian countries and the International Monetary Fund, but finally Russia refused to lend any amount to Iceland.

Cooperation between the two countries used to develop in several directions:

- inter-parliamentary cooperation
- trade and economic relations
- cooperation in the field of fisheries in the framework of NAFO, NEAFC, IWC
- in the field of "clean energy" partnership (renewable energy sources)
- cultural interaction (exchange of exhibitions, the annual Days of Russian Culture in Iceland)

During the 4th International Arctic Forum in Arkhangelsk in March 2017, then Icelandic President Guðni Th. Jóhannesson met with Russian president Vladimir Putin. The two met again during the 5th International Arctic Forum in St. Petersburg on April 10, 2019.

Towards the end of March 2018, Iceland suspended high-level bilateral dialogue with Russian authorities. As a result, leaders of Iceland did not attend the 2018 World Cup in Russia. This was due to the poisoning of Sergei Skripal in Salisbury, England. In a statement on their website, Icelandic officials stated that the Russian response to the attack was "severely lacking" and did not showcase as to how a nerve agent produced in Russia came to be used against civilians in the United Kingdom. Unlike other countries who took action against Russia in response to the incident, Russia did not respond to Iceland's approach.

After the start of the Russian invasion of Ukraine on February 24, 2022, Iceland joined the European Union in sanctions on Russia, and was added by Russia onto its "unfriendly countries list".

== Trade ==
In 2003 Russian-Icelandic trade was US$89.7 million. Export from Iceland to Russia was US$13.8 million, while import was $US75.9 million. Russia used to be the 9th largest exporter to Iceland. Exports consisted of raw materials: oil products (62.3%), aluminium (27%). Iceland used to export ships and vessels (25.1%), sea products (23.3%), textiles and garment (14.9%), chemical fertilizers (10.8%), and industrial equipment (9.5%).

== See also ==
- Foreign relations of Iceland
- Foreign relations of Russia
- List of ambassadors of Iceland to Russia
- List of ambassadors of Russia to Iceland
