= Stefán Haukur Jóhannesson =

Icelandic diplomat (born 1959)

Stefán Haukur Jóhannesson (born 4 January 1959 in the Westman Islands, Iceland) is an Icelandic diplomat. He has been the head of mission to the European Union (EU) and Ambassador to Belgium since September 2025. He was previously Ambassador to Japan from April 2021 to 2025 and Ambassador to the United Kingdom from November 2017 to November 2020.

== Career ==
Jóhannesson has been a civil servant since 1985. From 2001 to 2005, he was the Ambassador of Iceland to the UN in Geneva, and concurrently from 2002 to 2005, the Ambassador of Iceland to Slovenia. From 2005 to 2010, Jóhannesson was the Ambassador to the Netherlands, Luxembourg, Morocco, Switzerland and the EU.

Between 2009 and 2013, Jóhannesson was the Chief Negotiator in Iceland's accession talks with the European Union. The talks were later abandoned.

Jóhannesson was made the Ambassador to the United Kingdom in November 2017. He presented his Letters of Credence to Queen Elizabeth II on 14 December 2017. In November 2020, he was replaced by Sturla Sigurjónsson.

Jóhannesson had already been appointed the Ambassador to Japan in August 2020 and originally would take the post at the turn of the year between 2020 and 2021. He presented his letter of credence to Emperor Naruhito on 8 April 2021. Jóhannesson continued as ambassador to Japan until 2025.

In 2025, Jóhannesson became Iceland's head of mission to the EU as well as Ambassador to Belgium, Luxembourg, the Netherlands and San Marino. He presented his letters of credence to Philippe of Belgium and to António Costa and Ursula von der Leyen in September 2025.

== Personal life ==
Jóhannesson is married to Halldóra Hermannsdóttir and they have three children, including Einar Stefánsson, musician from Vök and Hatari. He has a law degree from the University of Iceland.

== See also ==
- Iceland–United Kingdom relations
- Ambassadors of Iceland
