= Iceland–Ukraine relations =

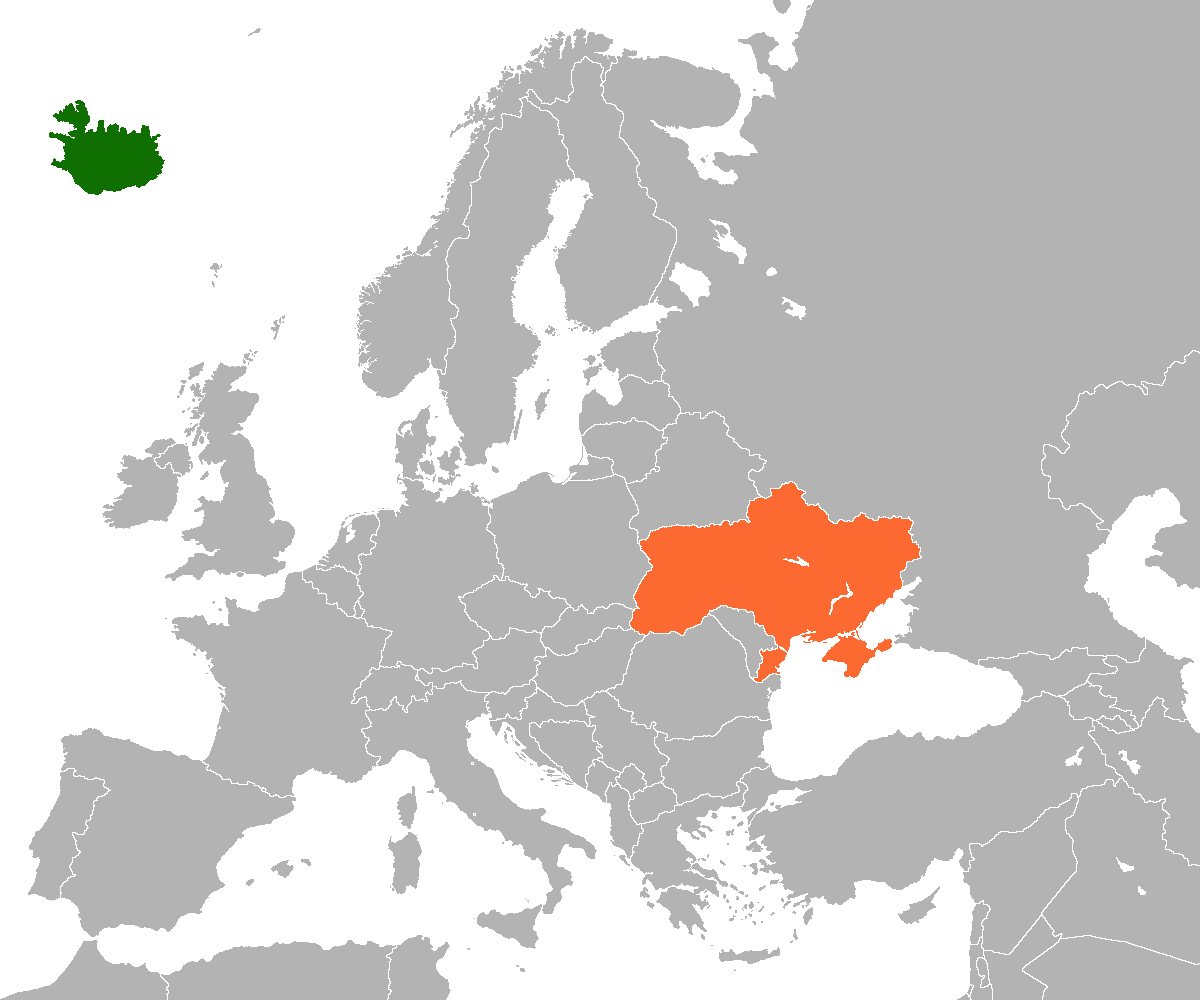
- Iceland: Ukraine

Iceland–Ukraine relations are the bilateral relations between Iceland and Ukraine, as well as cooperation between the two countries in international organizations and other international institutions.

== Political dialogue ==
Unlike other Scandinavian countries, Ukraine's political dialogue with Iceland is characterized by irregularity and low intensity. It seems that the Icelandic side is more interested in maintaining bilateral relations than the Ukrainian side. The last high-level visit from Ukraine to Iceland took place in May 2002, when the Ukrainian Foreign Minister Anatoliy Zlenko visited the country. Since then, Icelandic Prime Minister Davíð Oddsson (February 2004) and Icelandic Foreign Minister Valgerður Sverrisdóttir (November 2006) have both paid an official visit to Ukraine.

=== 2021–22 Russo-Ukrainian crisis ===
Icelandic Foreign Minister Þórdís Kolbrún R. Gylfadóttir expressed support for Ukraine in the conflict, and said that Russia's actions "must have consequences".

== Trade and economic relations ==
Trade and economic relations with Iceland since 2009 are limited to imports of Icelandic fresh and frozen fish to Ukraine. The volume of these imports and, accordingly, the total volume of bilateral trade in 2009 reached US$38.75 million. In previous years, Ukraine exported to Iceland, however, in small quantities, industrial products. At the same time, Iceland is the 40th among 123 countries-investors in terms of direct investment in Ukraine. Direct investment from Iceland - $ 25 million. The largest of the Icelandic investments in Ukraine was the acquisition in 2006 by the Icelandic International Private Investment Bank together with other investors of a controlling stake (92.5%) in the shares of the Ukrainian Joint-Stock Commercial Bank Lviv in the amount of 8 million USD.

== Diplomatic missions ==
- Iceland is accredited to Ukraine from its embassy in Helsinki, Finland.
- Ukraine is accredited to Iceland from its embassy in Helsinki, Finland.

== See also ==
- Foreign relations of Iceland
- Foreign relations of Ukraine
- Ukraine-NATO relations

== Literature ==
- Кривонос Р.А. Особливості співробітництва України з країнами Північної Європи // Україна в Європі: контекст міжнародних відносин: колективна монографія / За ред. А.І. Кудряченка. – К.: Фенікс, 2011. – С. 441 – 463.
