= Iceland–Turkey relations =

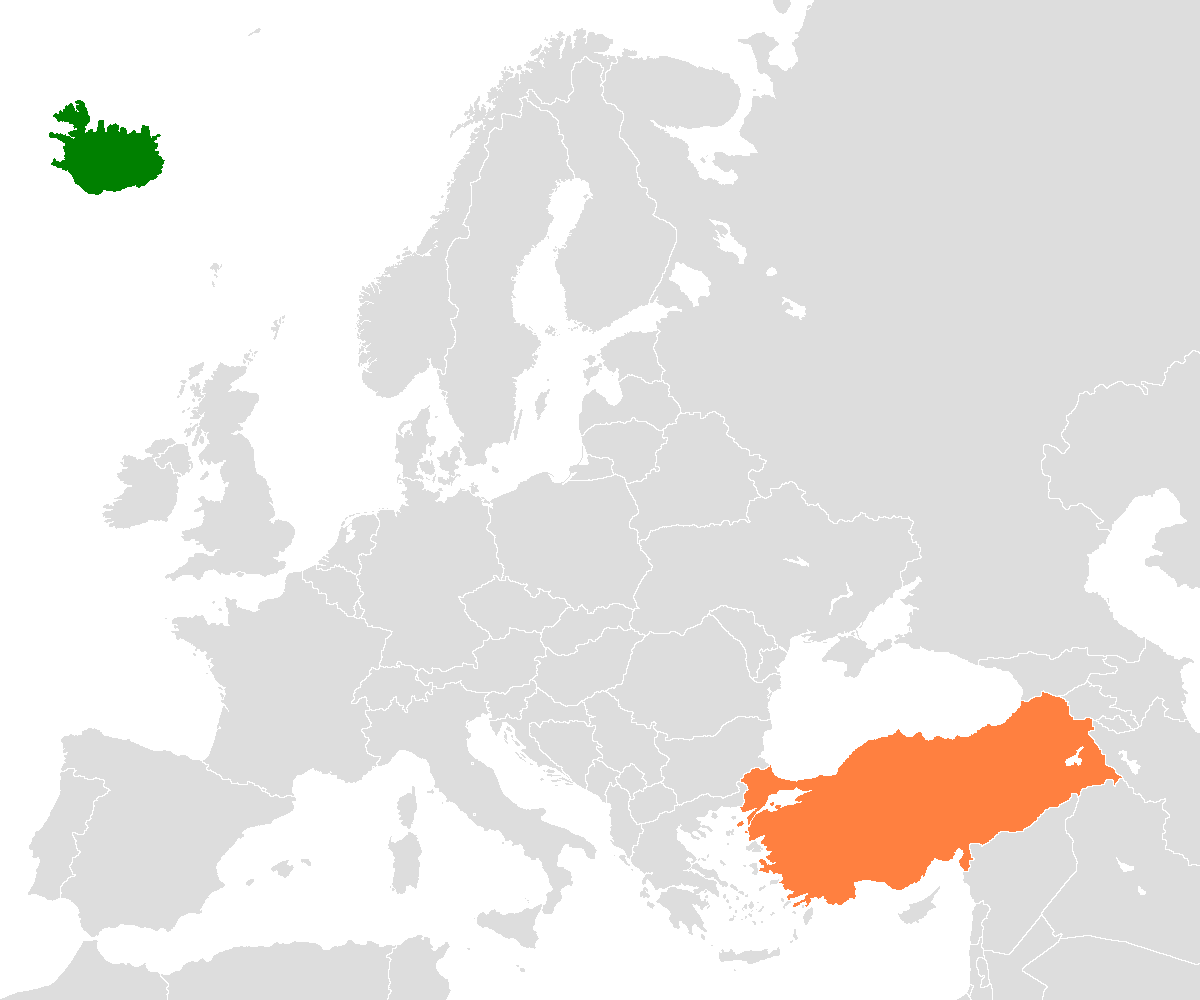
- Iceland: Turkey

Iceland–Turkey relations are the bilateral relations between Iceland and Turkey. Turkey has an embassy in Reykjavík, the Icelandic Embassy in Copenhagen is accredited to Turkey. The diplomatic relations were established in 1957.

== History ==
=== 17th century ===
Under the supervision of a Danish convert, Maghreb pirates, including converts from Europe, traveled to Iceland in 1627 to raid various coastal communities. These raids were dubbed as Turkish Abductions and is said to have a significant impact on Icelandic culture. The label "Turkish" does not refer to Turkey; at the time it was a general term for all Muslims in the Mediterranean region since the majority were a part of the Ottoman Empire The event was used as a driving force in Iceland's 19th century struggle for independence.

=== Modern times ===
In 1930, Turkey and Iceland made their first significant contact. On May 31 of that year, Turkey and Denmark signed a trade agreement. Iceland informed Turkey of its wish to develop trade links through the Danish ambassador during this arrangement. The Turkish Ministry of Foreign Affairs requested that the head of the trade mission draft a project for a trade and navigation agreement with Iceland in response to this request. The Ministry of Foreign Affairs then drafted a report on the subject, which was delivered to the Ministry of Economics. Commercial dealings with Iceland were found suitable, according to the study.

On June 28, 1955, the ambassadors of Turkey and Iceland signed an agreement in Paris on the mutual removal of visas. Citizens of Turkey and Iceland would be free to stay in the other nation for up to three months without a visa under this agreement, which took effect on July 1, 1955. Visa restrictions came back after Iceland became a member state of the Schengen Area since 2001.

A small diplomatic incident occurred when the Turkish national football team tried to pass Iceland's Keflavík International Airport for a UEFA Euro 2020 qualifying match against Iceland. The airport police kept them waiting for three hours at passport control and subjected their personal belongings to an invasive search. Turkish Foreign Minister Mevlüt Çavuşoğlu called the team's treatment "unacceptable in terms of diplomatic and humanitarian practice".

== Diplomatic relations ==
In Reykjavík, the capital of Iceland, a trader named Björn Ólafsson applied to the Turkish Embassy in Stockholm to become the consul general of Turkey in 1934. Because there were limited trade ties with Iceland, the Ministry of Foreign Affairs did not believe it was essential to open an honorary consulate. They did, however, ask the embassy for an opinion on Björn's personality and if they might benefit from his reputation, and they urged that the individual be investigated. The embassy's study found that Björn had a solid reputation and could contribute significantly to the development of economic relations with Iceland.

According to the report, Björn would take up the tobacco industry, thus having an official representative in this nation would be helpful, even if merely to ensure tobacco sales. The embassy, however, did not approve the consulate's inauguration since he had earlier turned down the Danish Embassy's offer of a business arrangement with Iceland. In the end, the Turkish ministry stated the lack of trade between Turkey and Iceland as the reason for not opening a consulate.

The Turkish government decided to open a plenipotentiary embassy in Iceland's capital in September 1957. However, no separate ambassador to Iceland was chosen, and no diplomatic building was established. In 1958, the Turkish ambassador to Oslo, Fuat Bayramoğlu, was appointed to represent Turkey as plenipotentiary in Iceland. In 1960, upon the approval of the request by the Government of Turkey, an honorary consulate was established in Iceland. Iceland opened a consulate in Istanbul on 27 July 1960.

== Economic relations ==
In 1973, Iceland’s exports to Turkey reached 1% of the total export of Iceland. In 2018, Turkey and Iceland's bilateral trade volume totaled 51 million dollars. Road vehicles, salt, sulfide, and gypsum are the main Turkish exports to Iceland. Fish and seashells, raw aluminum, machinery, and boilers are the most common Turkish imports from Iceland.

In the years 2002—2018, Icelanders invested $3 million in Turkey. Turkish investments in Iceland totaled 2 million dollars during the same time period.

== See also ==
- Foreign relations of Iceland
- Foreign relations of Turkey
