= Iceland–Sweden relations =

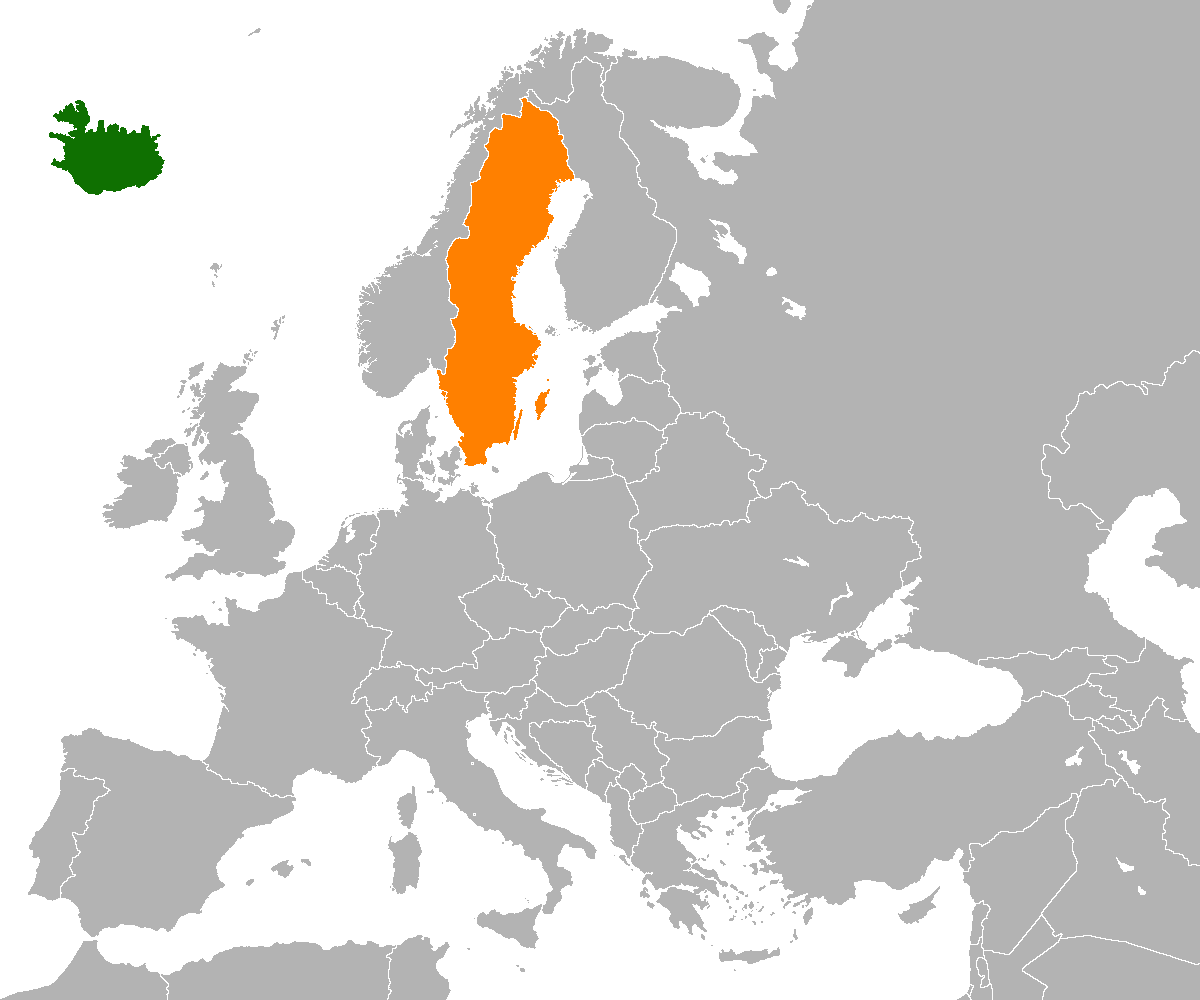
- Iceland: Sweden

Iceland–Sweden relations (Icelandic: Samskipti Íslands og Svíþjóðar, Swedish: Islands-svenska relationer) refers to the bilateral relations between Iceland and Sweden. Both nations are Nordic countries and are members of the Arctic Council, Council of the Baltic Sea States, Council of Europe, NATO, Nordic-Baltic Eight, Nordic Council, Organisation for Economic Co-operation and Development, Organization for Security and Co-operation in Europe, Joint Expeditionary Force and the United Nations.

== History ==
Iceland and Sweden are two Nordic countries once inhabited by the Vikings. The first known Swede to arrive to Iceland was Garðar Svavarsson in 870. He became the first person to circumnavigate Iceland. In 1380, Iceland (at the time ruled by Norway) joined the Kalmar Union joining Iceland under a single monarch with the three kingdoms of Denmark, Norway and Sweden. Both Iceland and Sweden were joined as one nation until the dissolution of the union in 1523. After the union, Iceland was ruled by Denmark until obtaining its independence (under a Danish constitutional monarchy) in 1918. On 27 July 1940, both Iceland and Sweden established diplomatic relations. In June 1944, Iceland became a republic and both nations opened embassies in each other's capitals, respectively. During World War II both nations remained officially neutral, however, Iceland was invaded by the allies and used as a base while Sweden unofficially assisted the allies.

Since the establishment of diplomatic relations between Iceland and Sweden, both countries have actively participated in the international arena to discuss issues affecting the Nordic nations such as climate change, Arctic policy and in mutual defense outside of NATO. Both countries have participated in foreign expeditions such as in Afghanistan with the International Security Assistance Force.

During the Icelandic financial crisis from 2008 to 2011, Sweden's National Bank issued 5 billion Swedish Krona (€520 million) to Iceland's Kaupthing Bank in order to pay "depositors and other creditors" affected by the financial crisis.

== Trade ==
Iceland, as a member of the European Free Trade Association has unrestricted access to the European Union market (which includes Sweden). In 2015, total trade between Iceland and the EU totaled €5.7 billion Euros.

== Resident diplomatic missions ==
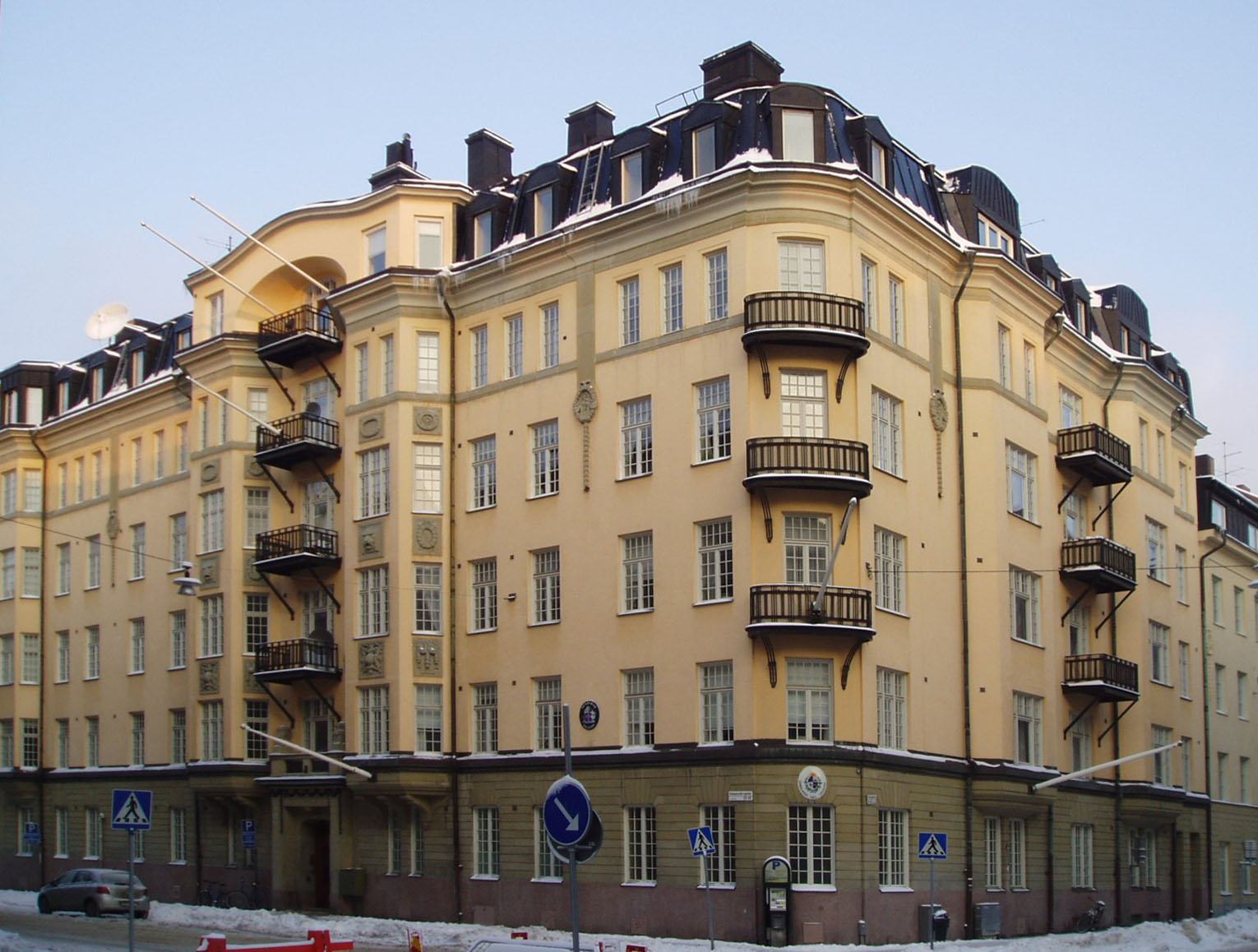
Embassy of Iceland in Stockholm

- Iceland has an embassy in Stockholm.
- Sweden has an embassy in Reykjavík.

== See also ==
- Foreign relations of Iceland
- Foreign relations of Sweden
- Iceland-EU relations
- NATO-EU relations
- Nordic Passport Union
- Scandinavia
- Viking Age
