= Czech Republic–Iceland relations =

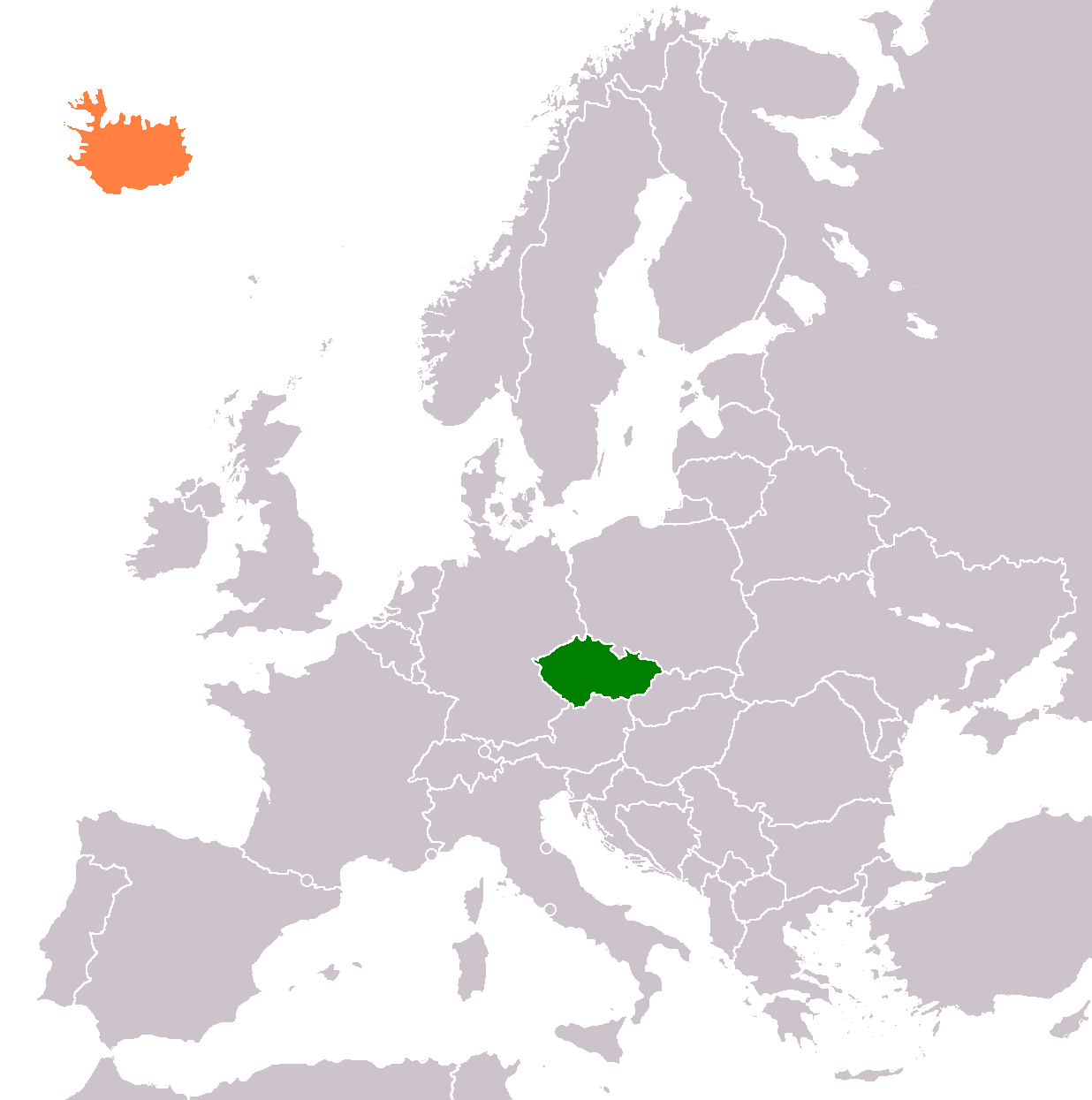
- Czech Republic: Iceland

Czech Republic–Iceland relations are foreign relations between the Czech Republic and Iceland. Both countries established diplomatic relations on 1 January 1993. The Czech Republic is represented in Iceland through an honorary consulate in Reykjavík. Iceland is represented in the Czech Republic through its embassy in Vienna (Austria) and through an honorary consulate in Prague.

Both countries are full members of NATO, the European Economic Area, of the Council of Europe, of the Organisation for Economic Co-operation and Development, and of the Organization for Security and Co-operation in Europe.

== Military cooperation ==
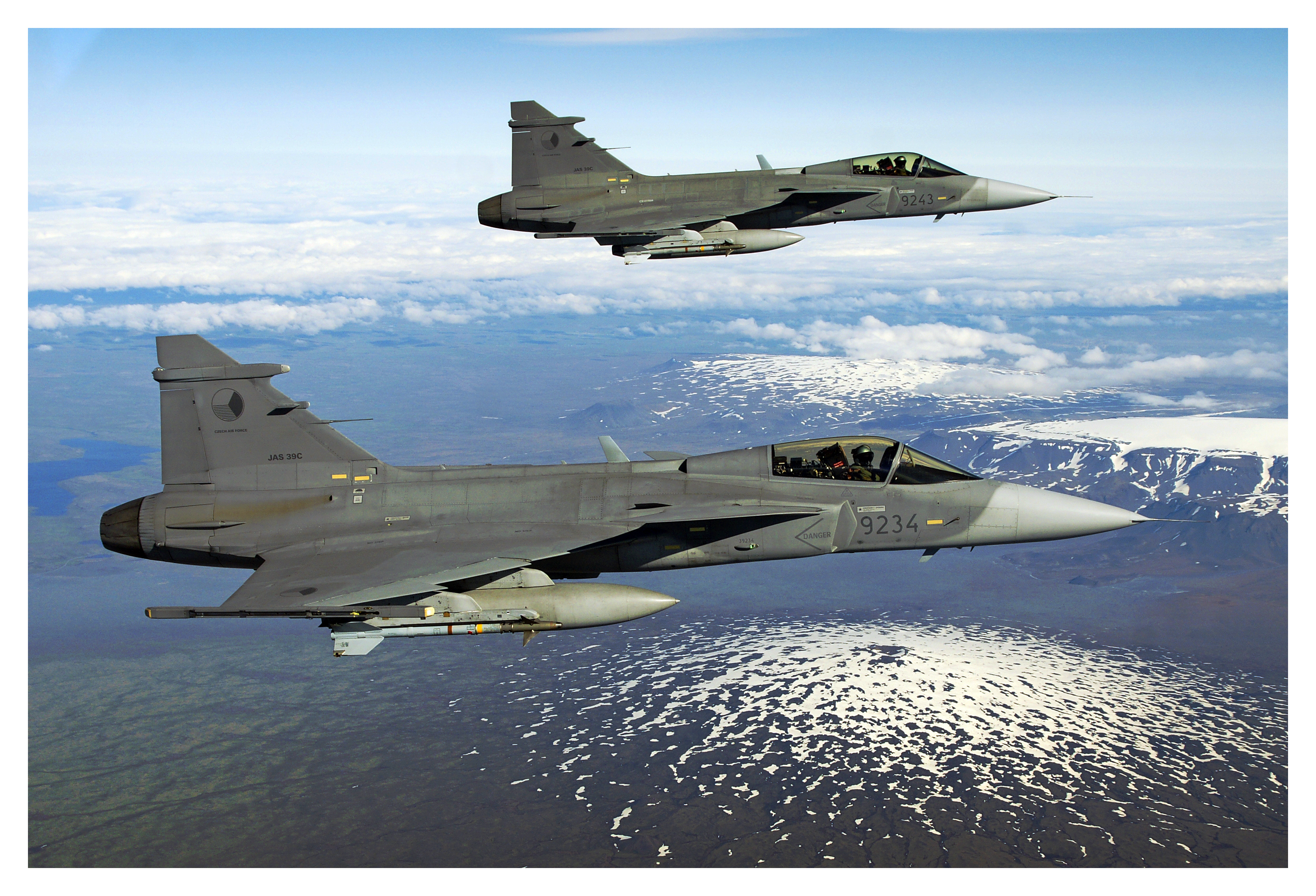
Czech Air Force during the NATO Icelandic Air Policing in 2015

The Czech Air Force takes part in the NATO Icelandic Air Policing mission to guard the airspace over Iceland.

== State visits ==
The first top-level meeting between the countries took place in 1997, when Czech Prime Minister Václav Klaus went to Iceland on a state visit. He met with his counterpart, Icelandic Prime Minister Davíð Oddsson to discuss NATO.

Czech President Václav Havel made an official visit to Iceland in 1999, meeting with Icelandic President Ólafur Ragnar Grímsson. Topics of discussion included NATO membership and the possibilities of its future expansion.

Václav Klaus, as Czech President, made a state visit to Iceland in 2005. He met Icelandic Prime Minister Halldór Ásgrímsson. During the visit Klaus indicated support for Iceland's membership of the European Union.

== See also ==
- Foreign relations of the Czech Republic
- Foreign relations of Iceland
- Iceland-EU relations
- NATO-EU relations
