= Iceland–Spain relations =

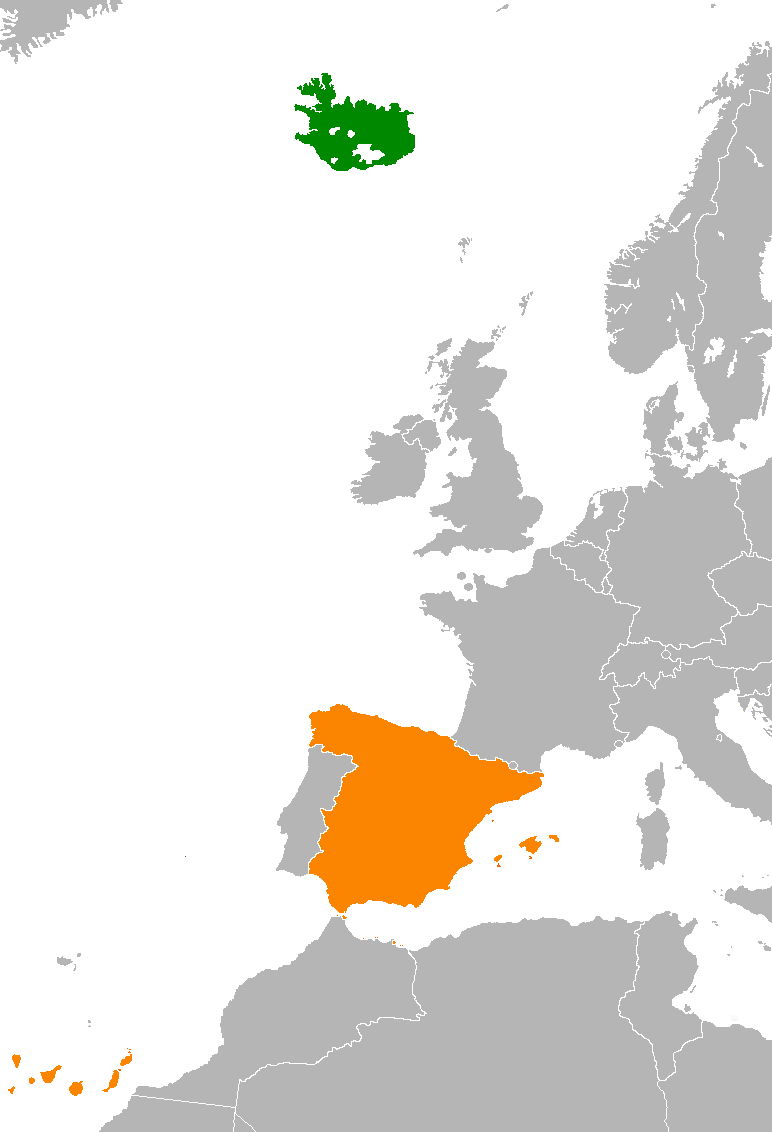
- Iceland: Spain

Iceland–Spain relations are the bilateral and diplomatic relations between these two countries. Iceland has an embassy in Madrid and a consulate in Barcelona. The representation of Spain in Iceland is made from the Oslo embassy, in Norway. Spain has an honorary consulate and an honorary vice consulate in Reykjavík. Both countries are members of the Council of Europe, and NATO.

== History ==
In 1918, when Iceland, through the Union Act, became a sovereign State, Denmark assumed the foreign relations of the new State, so that the Danish Diplomatic Missions and Consulates were also available to Iceland's interests . However, as early as 1921 a mission made up of Icelandic special delegates arrived in Spain to negotiate with the Spanish Government the tariffs on cod. On the other hand, in 1925, Iceland appointed a special, non-diplomatic representative, residing in Barcelona to serve the commercial interests of his country with all the Mediterranean countries.

Spain had long been an important market for Icelandic salt cod, however due to prohibition in Iceland in 1921 the Spanish threatened to stop importing Iceland's at the time most profitable export unless they agreed to buy wine from the Spanish.

In 1944, when Iceland was constituted as a Republic and definitively separated from Denmark, the Minister of the Legation of Spain in Copenhagen represented Spain in Iceland under multiple accreditation regime. The formal date of the establishment of diplomatic relations of Spain with the Republic of Iceland is 24 November 1949.

In 1966, the rank was raised to Embassy and since then it is the ambassador of Spain in Norway who is also accredited as Ambassador in Reykjavík and the Ambassador of Iceland in France is accredited as Ambassador in Madrid.

Iceland opened its embassy in Madrid on 1 December 2025.

== Diplomatic relations ==
Bilateral relations are diplomatic, relatively limited, although contacts are made periodically on matters of common interest. In the 1980s there was an exchange of State visits: in 1985, the then President of Iceland, Vigdis Finnborgadóttir, made a visit to Spain that was returned by the Kings of Spain in 1989. On 17–20 February 2014, the Icelandic president paid a visit to Madrid and Barcelona, in which he held an interview with the King.

== Tourism ==
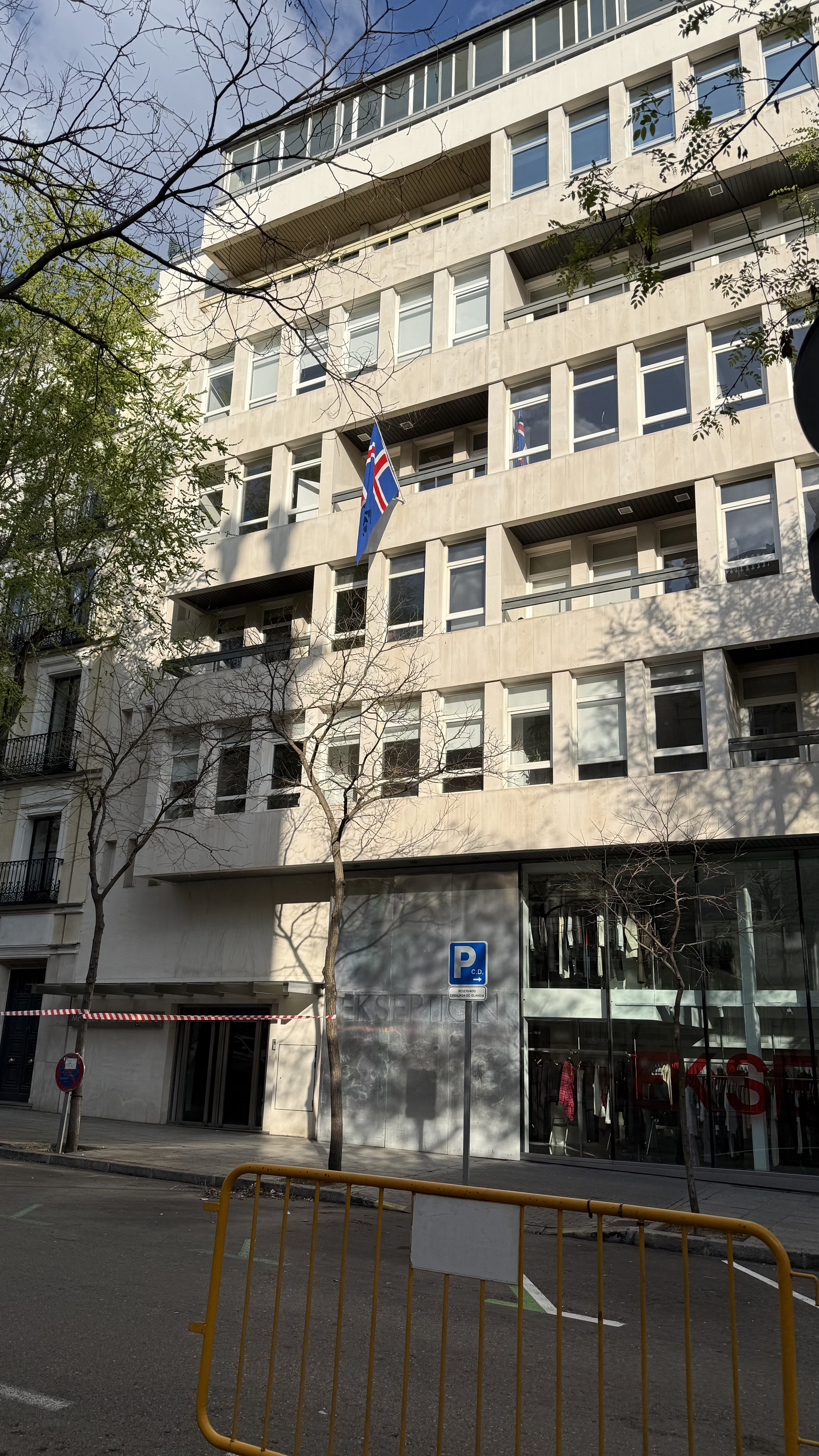
Embassy of Iceland in Madrid

As for tourism, some 40,000 Icelanders visit Spain annually, which was drastically halted due to the crisis and depreciation of the Icelandic crown, decreasing the number of Icelandic tourists to 24,437 in 2012. From that year the growth has recovered, and Icelandic tourists to Spain have been 14,016 in 2013 and 54,014 in 2014. The most visited Spanish destination is Canary Islands (24,016 tourists in 2014, with a decrease of −12.8% compared to the previous year). The appreciation of euro has driven the increase in Spanish tourism in Iceland, which went from 10,438 people in 2008 to 13,771 in 2009, to go down to 12,237 in 2010. In 2012, about 15,278 Spaniards traveled to Iceland, number that amounted to 17,017 in 2013. In 2014 about 20,932 Spanish tourists visited Iceland.

== Resident diplomatic missions ==
- Iceland has an embassy in Madrid.
- Spain is accredited to Iceland from its embassy in Oslo, Norway.

== See also ==
- Foreign relations of Iceland
- Foreign relations of Spain
- Iceland-EU relations
- NATO-EU relations
