= Iceland–Japan relations =

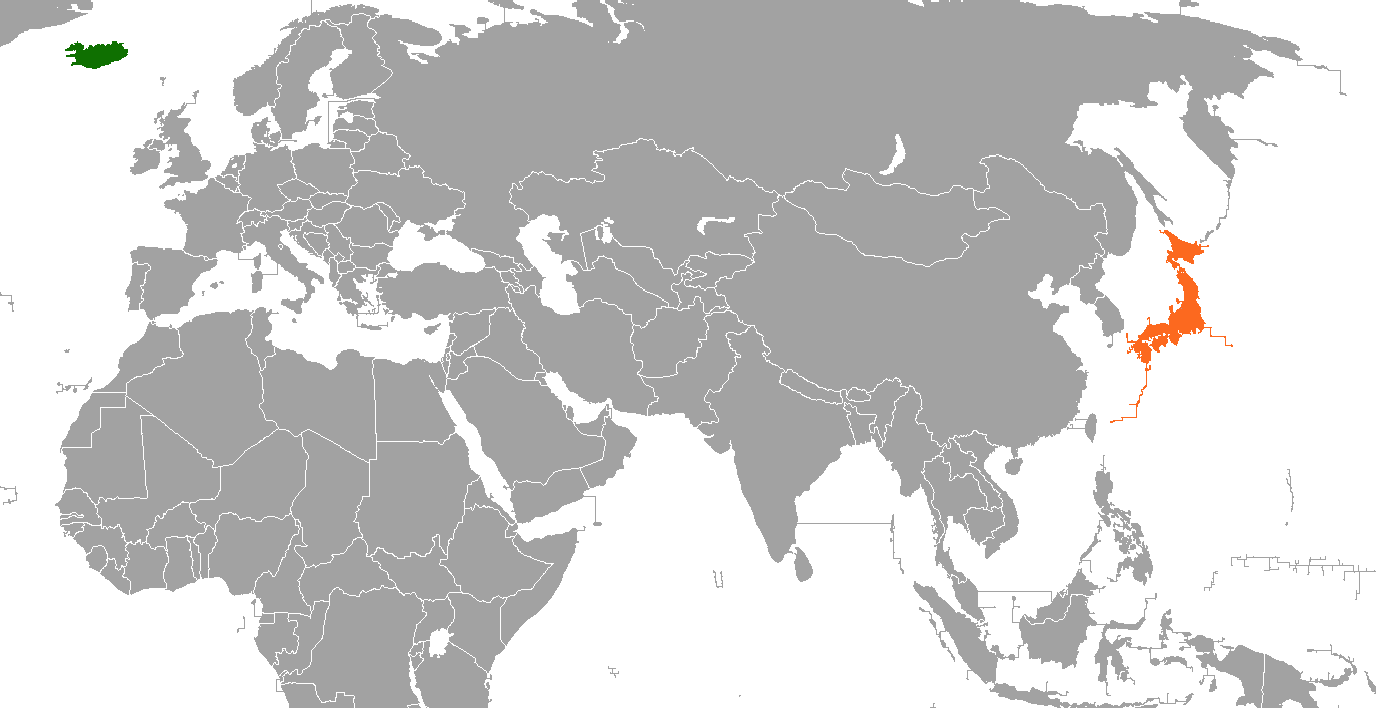
- Iceland: Japan

Iceland–Japan relations refers to the diplomatic relations between Iceland and Japan. Both nations are members of the Organisation for Economic Co-operation and Development.

== History ==
In 1814, Iceland became a part of the Kingdom of Denmark. In 1867, the Kingdom of Denmark and Japan signed a "Treaty of Friendship, Commerce and Navigation". Any and all trade relations between Iceland and Japan was carried out by Denmark. In 1944, Iceland became an independent nation. On 8 December 1956, Iceland and Japan established diplomatic relations.

In June 1999, Japanese Prime Minister Keizō Obuchi paid an official visit to Iceland. During his visit, Prime Minister Obuchi announced the opening of a Japanese embassy in Reykjavík. In 2002, both nations opened embassies in their respective capitals. In 2003, the University of Iceland began teaching Japanese as the first university course in Iceland to teach an Asian language and to specialize in Asian culture. In 2005, Iceland approached Japan on a free-trade accord. Each year, both nations obtain negative attention in the fact that they both continue whaling. In 2016, both nations celebrated 60 years of diplomatic relations.

== High-level visits ==
Prime Ministerial visits from Iceland to Japan

- Prime Minister Davíð Oddsson (1994, 2003)
- Prime Minister Halldór Ásgrímsson (2005)

Prime Ministerial visits from Japan to Iceland

- Prime Minister Keizō Obuchi (1999)

== Agreements ==
Both nations have signed bilateral agreements such as an Agreement on the Elimination of Double Taxation with respect to Taxes on Income and the Prevention of Tax Evasion and Avoidance (2018) and an Agreement of a Working holiday visa (2018).

== Trade ==
In 2015, trade between Iceland and Japan totaled US$222 million. Icelandic exports to Japan include: fish and steel. Japanese exports to Iceland include: automobiles and electronic equipment. Several well known multinational Japanese companies such as Honda, Sony, Toshiba and Toyota (among others) operate in Iceland.

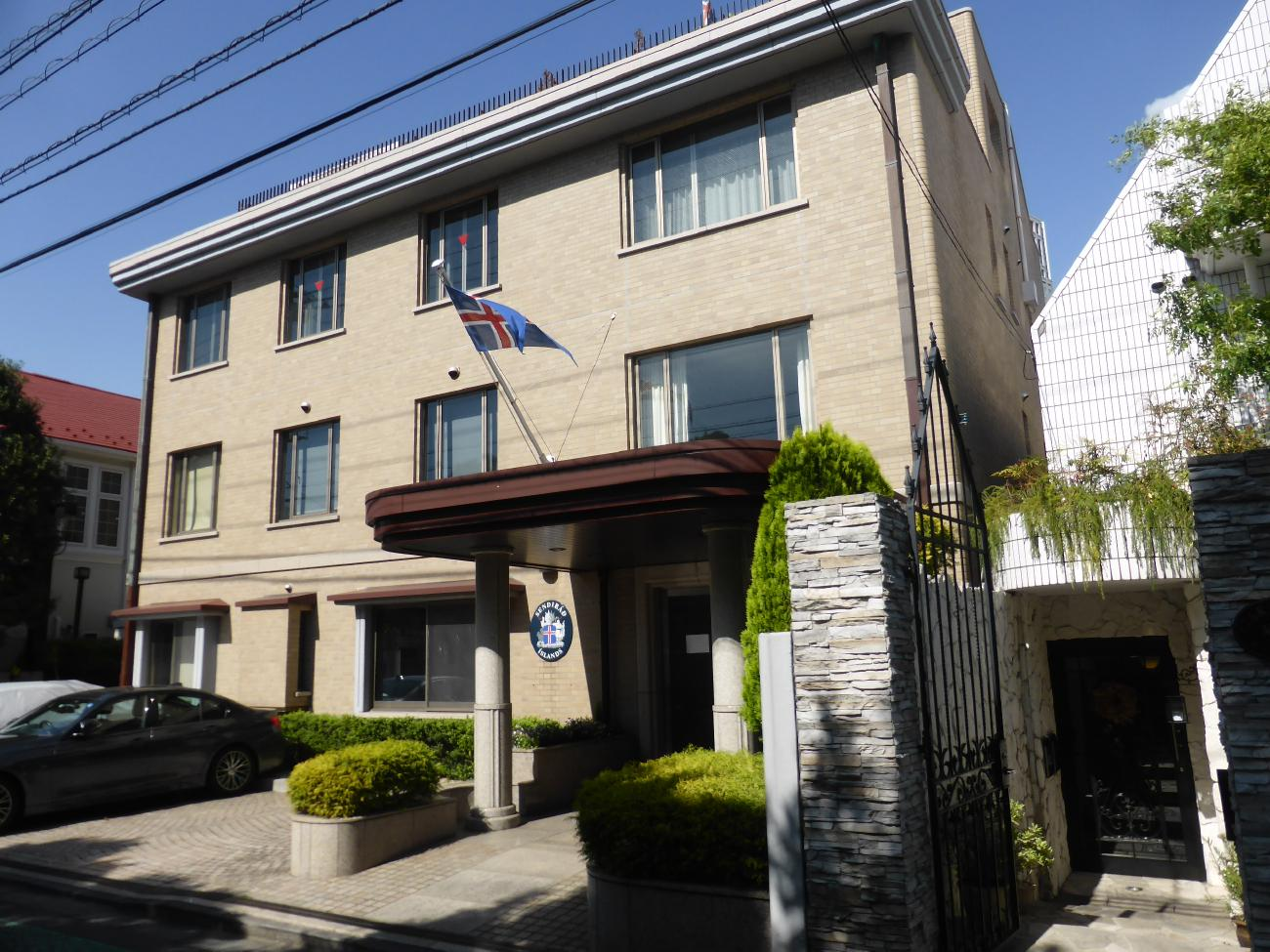
Embassy of Iceland in Tokyo

== Resident diplomatic missions ==
- Iceland has an embassy in Tokyo.
- Japan has an embassy in Reykjavík.

== See also ==
- Foreign relations of Iceland
- Foreign relations of Japan
- Cold Fever
- Go with the Clouds, North by Northwest
