= Iceland–India relations =

- Iceland: India

Iceland–India relations are the bilateral relations between Iceland and India. Historically, these relations have been friendly but lacked substantive content. Iceland and India established diplomatic relations in 1972. At that time the embassy of Iceland in London, United Kingdom was accredited to India and the embassy of India in Oslo, Norway, was accredited to Iceland. Embassies were established in New Delhi in 2005 and in Reykjavík in 2006.

== History ==
Iceland and India established diplomatic relations in 1975. The embassy of Iceland in London, United Kingdom was accredited to India and the embassy of India in Oslo, Norway, was accredited to Iceland. However, it was only after 2005 that the two countries began to strengthen their diplomatic and economic relationships. In 2005, President of Iceland Ólafur Ragnar Grímsson made the first visit by an Icelandic President to India. During the visit, Iceland pledged support for India's candidature for a permanent seat at the United Nation Security Council, thus becoming the first Nordic country to do so. This was followed by an official visit by the President of India A. P. J. Abdul Kalam to Iceland in May 2005. Following this a new embassy of Iceland was opened in New Delhi on 12 February 2006. Soon, an Indian Navy team visited Iceland on friendly mission. Gunnar Pálsson is the incumbent ambassador of Iceland to India. India appointed S. Swaminathan as the first resident ambassador to Iceland in March 2008.

== Economic relations ==
India Iceland Trade (in US $ millions)
Year	Export from Iceland to India	Export from India to Iceland
2001	0.46	13.01
2002	0.47	27.19
2003	0.76	23.08
2004	0.89	16.10
2005	1.14	18.95

Iceland exported goods to India amounting to US $1.14 million in 2007. The main item of export were fish products, primarily cod, amounting to 77% of the total exports. Other items included industrial goods and medical products. India exported US$18.95 million worth of goods to Iceland in the same year, in which consumer goods were the largest with 52.5% of total exports, followed by raw materials at 37.8%. The trade between the two countries is still considered limited, but with growth potential. By 2007, total bilateral trade was US$26.7 million of which imports from India were US$25.1 million and exports to India were US$1.6 million.

== Agreements ==
India and Iceland signed a Double Taxation Avoidance Agreement to strengthen the ties of economic cooperation. The treaty covers the taxes of income, dividends, interest, royalties and fees for technical services and stipulates that the rate of tax in the country where the income was made must not be higher than 10%. The two countries also signed a Memorandum of Understanding (MoU) for co-operation in the renewable energy sector. Iceland and India cooperate in hydrogen cells and fuel cells under the forum of International Partnership for Hydrogen Economy.

Both countries have also signed a MoU for studies of anomalies ahead of earthquakes. In 2007, both states also signed an MoU on Sustainable Fisheries Development and a Bilateral Investment Protection Agreement.
