= Iceland–Mexico relations =

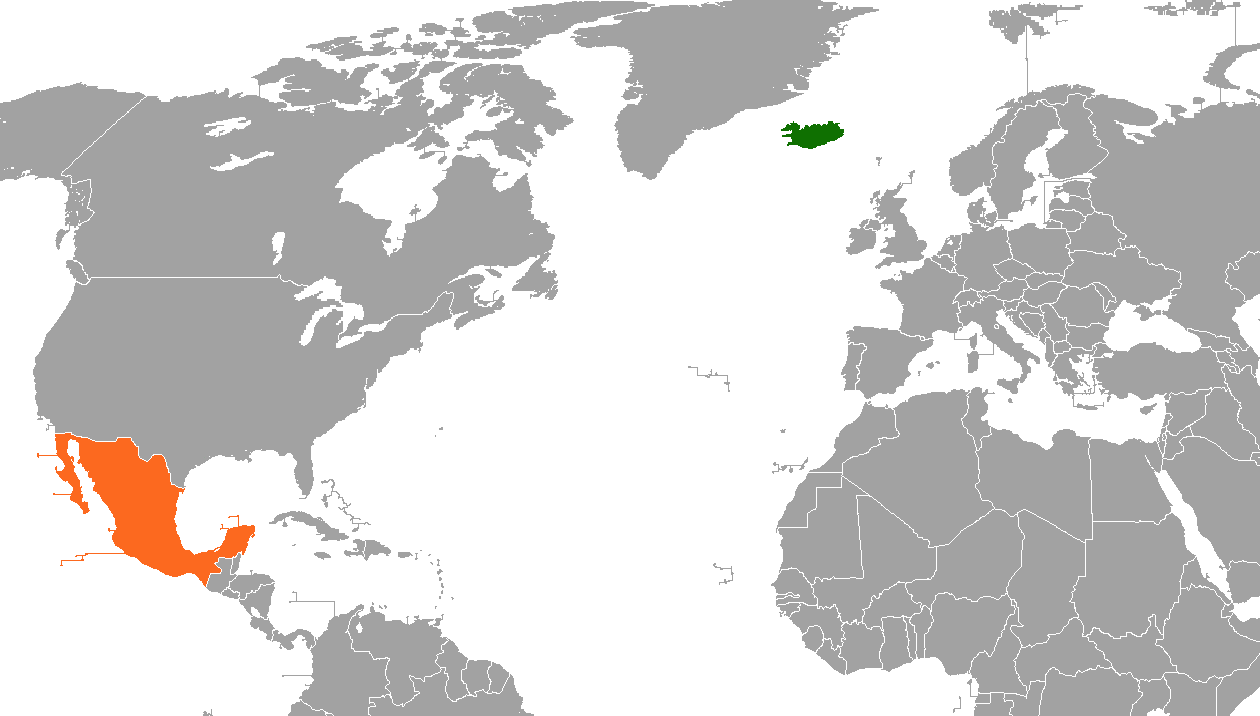

- Iceland: Mexico

The nations of Iceland and Mexico established diplomatic relations in 1964. Both nations are mutual members of the Organisation for Economic Co-operation and Development, United Nations and the World Trade Organization.

== History ==
Iceland and Mexico established diplomatic relations on 24 March 1964. Initial relations between both nations were limited. In 1985, Icelandic Prime Minister Steingrímur Hermannsson became the first Icelandic head-of-government to visit Mexico and met with President Miguel de la Madrid. Since then, there have been other high level visits by Icelandic politicians to Mexico.

On 1 February 1999, Icelandic Prime Minister Davíð Oddsson paid an official visit to Mexico and met with Mexican President Ernesto Zedillo. During his visit, both leaders discussed a free trade agreement between Mexico and the European Economic Area (which includes Iceland). Both leaders also agreed to work closely together in increasing trade, tourism, cultural and educational events between both nations and the Icelandic Prime Minister announced that Iceland would be investing more in Mexico, especially in the town of Guaymas, Sonora.

In March 2008 Icelandic President Ólafur Ragnar Grímsson paid a state visit to Mexico and met with Mexican President Felipe Calderón. Icelandic Minister of Education, Thorgerdur Katrín Gunnarsdóttir, accompanied the president and Iceland's first lady on trip. Also attending were members of the Icelandic Ministry of Foreign Affairs, and the Presidential Office, as well as a trade delegation. President Grímsson addressed the people of Mexico on 11 March 2008, saying:

In this new century, mankind eagerly seeks and requires leadership born of the same qualities, searching for solutions to the most fundamental challenge of our times, the threat of climate change, which is so evident in the melting of the ice sheets and the glaciers and the rising sea levels all over the world. Due to the Gulf Stream, Mexico and Iceland are closely linked in this endeavour. Flowing from Mexico into the North–Atlantic, the Gulf Stream encircles my country and constitutes the core of the conveyor belt of ocean currents which in every continent regulates the climate. Cooperation between our countries is therefore both urgent and is endowed with symbolic value, reminding us how all nations now share a common fate, but also demonstrating to others new ways towards solutions....

In November 2017, the Annual World Summit, Global Forum of Women and Leaders in Politics was held in Reykjavík, Iceland. A Mexican delegation attended the event led by the Mexican Senator María del Rosario Guzmán Avilés.

In May 2024, Mexican Foreign Undersecretary Carmen Moreno Toscano traveled to Iceland leading a delegation to attend the IV Summit of Heads of State and Government of the Council of Europe as a Permanent Observer. During her trip, Ms. Moreno Toscano also met with the Icelandic Permanent Secretary of State of the Foreign Ministry. That same year, both nations celebrated 60 years of diplomatic relations.

== High-level visits ==
High-level visits from Iceland to Mexico

- Prime Minister Steingrímur Hermannsson (1985)
- President Ólafur Ragnar Grímsson (1998, 2004, 2008)
- Prime Minister Davíð Oddsson (1999)

High-level visits from Mexico to Iceland

- Senator María del Rosario Guzmán Avilés (2017)
- Foreign Undersecretary Carmen Moreno Toscano (2024)

== Bilateral agreements ==
Both nations have signed a few bilateral agreements such as an Agreement on Agriculture (2000); Agreement for the Promotion and Reciprocal Protection of Investments (2005); Agreement to Avoid Double Taxation and Prevent Tax Evasion in the Matter of Income Taxes (2008); Memorandum of Understanding to strengthen and promote bilateral technical cooperation in geothermal development (2015); and an Agreement on Air Services (2021).

== Trade ==
In 2001, Mexico signed a free trade agreement with the European Free Trade Association, which includes Iceland, Liechtenstein, Norway and Switzerland. In 2023, two-way trade between Iceland and Mexico amounted to US$16.9 million. Iceland's main exports to Mexico include: splints or other items and fracture appliances; telephones and mobile phones; parts and accessories for machines; fish fats and oil; frozen, preserved fish and caviar; hand adjustment keys; chemical based products; and petroleum oil. Mexico's main exports to Iceland include: motor vehicles for the transport of goods, axles and cranks, data processing machines, machinery parts, telephones and mobile phones, tools, plastic, margarine, coffee, and alcohol.

== Accredited diplomatic missions ==
- Iceland is accredited to Mexico from its embassy in Washington, D.C., United States and maintain an honorary consulate in Mexico City.
- Mexico is accredited to Iceland from its embassy in Copenhagen, Denmark and maintains an honorary consulate in Reykjavík.
