= Carl Jacob Burckhardt =

Swiss diplomat and historian (1891–1974)

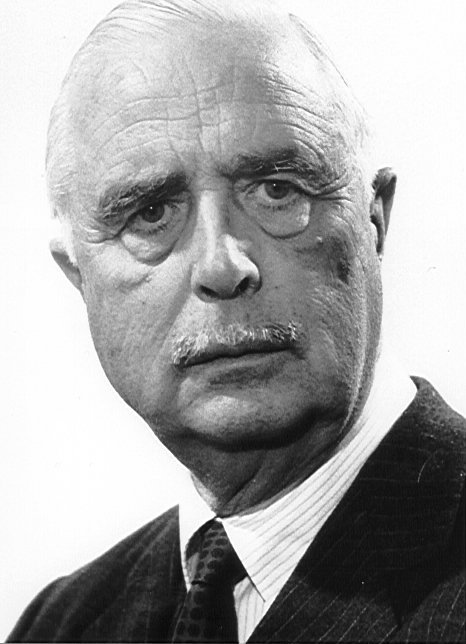

League of Nations High Commissioner for the Free City of Danzig
- In office 1937 – 1 September 1939
- Preceded by: Seán Lester
- Succeeded by: Position abolished

President of the International Committee of the Red Cross
- In office 1945–1948
- Preceded by: Max Huber
- Succeeded by: Paul Ruegger

Personal details
- Born: September 10, 1891 Basel, Switzerland
- Died: March 3, 1974 (aged 82) Vinzel, Switzerland
- Spouse: Marie-Elisabeth de Reynold (m. 1926)
- Children: 2
- Education: List: University of Basel; University of Zurich; Ludwig-Maximilians-Universität München; University of Göttingen

Carl Jacob Burckhardt (September 10, 1891 – March 3, 1974) was a Swiss diplomat, professor and historian. His career alternated between periods of academic historical research and diplomatic postings; the most prominent of the latter were League of Nations High Commissioner for the Free City of Danzig (1937–39) and President of the International Committee of the Red Cross (1945–48).

While serving as High Commissioner for Danzig, Burckhardt sought to avoid escalation of tensions between Nazi Germany and Poland into open military conflict. Unlike his predecessor, who had been removed as High Commissioner at Germany's insistence because he sought to protect Danzig's Jewish community, Burckhardt tried to cultivate relations with the "moderate" Nazi leaders of Danzig while blaming the Polish government for taking too uncompromising a stand against German demands that Danzig be returned to Germany. Those efforts, which had reflected the attitudes of the League, the United Kingdom and France, failed with Germany's invasion of Poland and seizure of Danzig on 1 September 1939. Burckhardt fled Danzig after being told by the Nazi Gauleiter for Danzig that he would be executed if he did not.

Burckhardt was a Germanophile with a visceral hatred of Bolshevism. Under his leadership following World War II the ICRC provided documents that helped many high-level Nazis, including Adolf Eichmann and Josef Mengele, escape Europe and evade justice for their war crimes.

== Life and early career ==
Burckhardt was born in Basel to Carl Christoph Burckhardt, a member of the patrician Burckhardt family, and attended gymnasium in Basel and Glarisegg (in Steckborn). He subsequently studied at the University of Basel, the University of Zurich, then at the Ludwig-Maximilians-Universität München, and finally the University of Göttingen, being particularly influenced by professors Ernst Gagliardi and Heinrich Wölfflin.

He gained his first diplomatic experience in the Swiss legation in Austria from 1918 to 1922, a chaotic period following the collapse of Austria-Hungary. While there, he became acquainted with Hugo von Hofmannsthal. Burckhardt earned his doctorate in 1922, and then accepted an appointment with the International Committee of the Red Cross (ICRC), which posted him to Asia Minor, where he assisted in the resettlement of Greeks expelled from Turkey following Greece's 1922 defeat.

He subsequently returned to Switzerland to pursue an academic career. In 1926, he married Marie-Elisabeth de Reynold (1906–1989), a daughter of Swiss writer, historian, and right-wing political activist Gonzague de Reynold. One year later he was appointed Privatdozent at the University of Zurich and in 1929 extraordinary professor of contemporary history. From 1932 to 1937, he was ordinary professor at the recently created Graduate Institute of International Studies in Geneva. While there, he published in 1935 the first volume of his comprehensive biography of Cardinal Richelieu, which would eventually be completed by the publication of the 4th volume in 1967.

== Last High Commissioner ==
=== Background to appointment ===
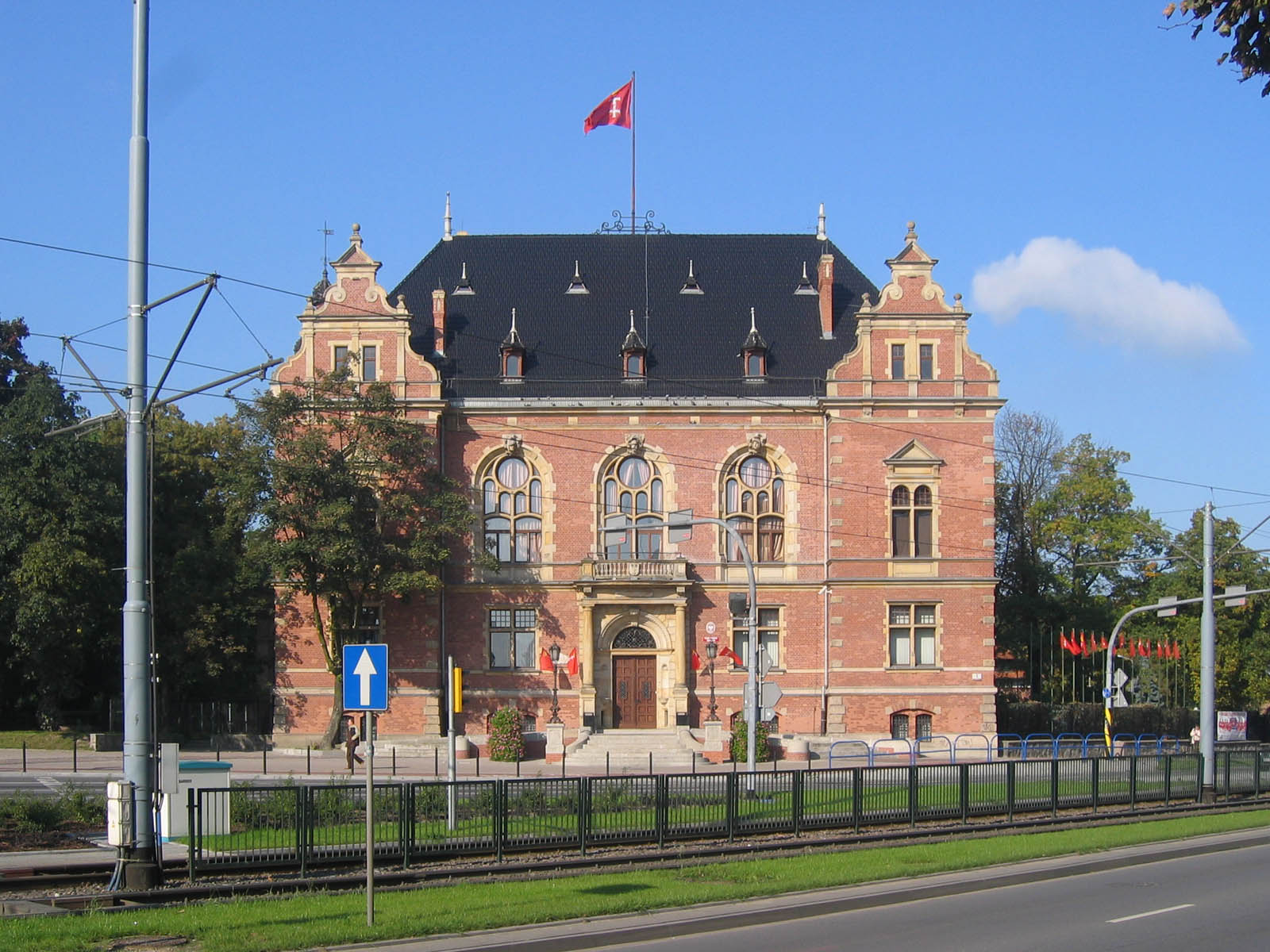
Seat of League of Nations High Commissioner for the Free City of Danzig

Burckhardt returned to a diplomatic career in 1937, serving as the final League of Nations High Commissioner for the Free City of Danzig from 1937 to 1939. In that position, he aimed to maintain the international status of Danzig guaranteed by the League of Nations, which brought him into contact with a number of prominent Nazis as he attempted to stave off increasing German demands.

The precise legal status of Danzig in the interwar era was, as the American historian Elizabeth Clark has noted, ambiguous: "...few experts, whether Polish, French or German, agreed on a legal description of the city, whether it was a sovereign state, a state without sovereignty, a Polish protectorate or a League of Nations protectorate". The Free City had some of the markers of sovereignty, such as its own police force, national anthem, flag, currency and stamps, but the Polish government had been granted certain rights in Danzig, such as control of the customs service and the right to represent the Free City of Danzig abroad.

The Treaty of Versailles declared the Free City to be a demilitarized zone, but made an exception by allowing the Polish Army to maintain a Military Transit Depot on the Westerplatte peninsula that faced Danzig harbour. Throughout its entire existence, the Free City of Danzig was a flashpoint in German-Polish tensions and was known as "Europe's most dangerous city" as it was considered to be the place where a German-Polish war was most likely to start.

In 1936, the previous High Commissioner for Danzig, the Irish diplomat Seán Lester, had been sacked at the instigation of Germany which, despite leaving the League of Nations in 1933, had demanded that Lester be fired for his attempts to protect the rights of Danzig's Jewish minority from the Nazi-dominated government of the Free City. Burchkhardt's instructions as the new High Commissioner were to exercise "restraint" in regards to the "Jewish Question" and not to strain relations with the government of the Free City.

The American historian Gerhard Weinberg wrote about Burchhardt's role as High Commissioner: "He would protect the Danzig opposition parties and the Jewish population as much as possible, but this was done to be with a minimum of friction and publicity". As the High Commissioner, Burckhardt was responsible to the League Council (the executive arm of the League of Nations that played an analogous role to the Security Council of the United Nations), but in practice answered to an informal committee on the League Council that consisted of the British, French and Swedish ambassadors to the League of Nations.

The League Secretary-General Joseph Avenol would have preferred that the League abandon its role in Danzig, but the Poles insisted that a new commissioner be appointed to replace Lester. Burkhardt was regarded as the logical choice to serve as the League High Commissioner as he was an experienced diplomat from a neutral nation whose first language was German.

Burckhardt was a close friend of Baron Ernst von Weizsäcker, the long-time German minister-plenipotentiary to Switzerland who had strongly urged him to take the post. Weizsäcker in his reports to Berlin painted Burckhardt as friendly towards Nazi Germany, writing that Burckhardt was a Germanophile who looked upon the Third Reich as the "bulwark against Bolshevism". Weizsäcker stated like many Swiss from Großbürgertum (upper class) families that Burckhardt felt threatened by the possibility of Communists raising the great masses of unemployed people caused by the Great Depression in a revolution, and strongly approved of the Nazi regime, which banned both the German Communist Party and the Social Democratic Party. Burckhardt was concerned by the prospect of a Marxist revolution in Germany overflowing into Switzerland, and in this way believed that Nazi regime was protecting Switzerland.

Weizsäcker, who had known Burckhardt for years, stated that Burckhardt as the League of Nations high commissioner for Danzig would profess to be neutral, but in practice favor Germany's claims to the Free City. Weizsäcker also noted that Burckhardt viewed Germany as Europe's "indispensable" nation whose success was crucial to the economic success of Europe as a whole, and favored revising the Treaty of Versailles in favor the Reich. Burckhardt was hesitant to take up the post of League of Nations high commissioner as his predecessor Lester had the subject of harassment and threats from the Danzig Nazis, but Weizsäcker assured him that he would not face such difficulties as he was known to be friend of Germany.

As a conservative Swiss from a Großbürgertum family with strong connections to the German elite, Burckhardt was felt to be the ideal man to represent the League in Danzig. The British historian D.C. Watt described Burckhardt as "a conservative, a believer in strong though not authoritarian government, a professional neutral from a country where neutrality is the dominant principle of foreign policy...".

=== Arrival in Danzig ===
Before leaving to take up his new post as High Commissioner, Burkhardt met with the Secretary-General Joseph Avenol, the British Foreign Secretary Anthony Eden, and the French Foreign Minister Yvon Delbos, who all told him that they did not want a repeat of Lester's conflict with the Danzig Nazis. The Polish Foreign Minister, Colonel Józef Beck—one of the leaders of the triumvirate that ran the Sanation military dictatorship—saw Germany and the Soviet Union as potential threats, but of the two the Soviet Union was considered to be "the enemy" with which no understanding was possible while Nazi Germany was seen as a potential ally against the Soviet Union.

The Polish historian Anita Pražmowaska wrote: "It was unfortunate that the Polish government concluded that the best way forward was to continue building stronger links with Germany while trying to reduce—what Beck considered to be—the League's irksome interference in Danzig". Upon first meeting Colonel Beck, Burchkhardt was informed in no uncertain terms that Poland wanted better relations with Germany as a potential ally against the Soviet Union and that Burckhardt should expect no help from Poland if he should come into conflict with the Danzig Nazis in the same manner that Lester had. Beck made it clear to Burckhardt that he believed he should resolve any problems regarding Danzig on his own via direct negotiations with Berlin.

Upon arriving in the Free City, Burckhardt found himself caught up in the feud between Danzig's two Nazi leaders, Albert Forster, the Gauleiter of Danzig who ruled the Danzig Gau of the NSDAP, and Arthur Greiser, the president of the Danzig Senate (the head of government of the Free City). Weinberg wrote about the relationship between Forster and Greiser: "The two could not abide each other, and the very fact that both were faithful followers of Hitler only made them rivals for the latter's affection and support. What one wanted, the other automatically rejected and vice-versa; only the occasional intervention of Hitler himself could bring them temporarily to the same course-until they parted company again on the next issue". Forster's and Greiser's inability to co-operate made for a highly dysfunctional administration of the Free City, and Burckhardt only found himself caught in the middle.

Of the two feuding Nazi leaders, Burckhardt much preferred Greiser, whom he regarded as the more reasonable of the two. He believed that Greiser privately wanted Danzig to continue as a Free City as his current position as Senate President made him the head of government and if Danzig "went home to the Reich", Gresier's status would be downgraded. Burckhardt described the office of high commissioner in the Free City as "a slowly dying organ of a decadent institution".

Burckhardt accepted that it was inevitable that the Free City of Danzig would "go home to the Reich" sometime in the near future and saw his task as ensuring that Free City would be allowed to rejoin Germany without causing a world war, rather than upholding the constitution of the Free City. Burchkardt believed that another world war would be the end of Western civilization.

=== First crises ===
Burckhardt's first major crisis occurred with the murder of Hans Wiechmann, the leader of the Danzig Social Democratic Party, by the Nazis. The fact that the trail of evidence for the responsibility for Wiechmann's murder led to Forster made for highly difficult relations as Burckhardt had to find various excuses for not ordering the arrest of Forster, which would have provoked a major incident with Germany.

The fact that Forster kept pressing to change the flag of the Free City along with plans to introduce anti-Semitic laws made for further difficulties. Upon first meeting him in March 1937, Forster greeted Burckhardt by saying: "So, you're the representative of that Jewish-Masonic talking shop in Geneva!" Foster told Burckhardt in April 1937 that he planned to introduce the Nuremberg Laws into the Free City, which would violate the Danzig constitution.

The World Jewish Congress had complained to the League of Nations that Forster's plans were a violation of the Danzig constitution, which Burckhardt as League High Commissioner had a duty to uphold. In a report to the League Council, Burckhardt stated that he was attempting to solve the problem in a "realistic" way by negotiating and lashed out at the World Jewish Congress, which he accused of only acting for "propagandistic" reasons.

=== Visit to Berlin, first audience with Hitler ===
In September 1937, Burckhardt visited Berlin, where he met Adolf Hitler at the Reich Chancellery. As Germany was not a member of the League of Nations, having left in 1933, Burckhardt had to obtain the approval of both Eden and the Polish Foreign Minister Colonel Józef Beck to meet Hitler.

On 20 September 1937, Burckhardt had his audience with Hitler. Burckhardt sought to flatter Hitler by calling him a "Realpolitiker" ("practical politician") who knew how to accomplish his goals and asked him to restrain Forster. During the meeting, Burckhardt seemed more interested in promoting Anglo-German friendship than in upholding the rights of the League, and he was taken aback by the anti-British tone of Hitler's remarks.

Hitler subjected Burchkhardt to a long rant about the Treaty of Versailles which had severed Danzig from Germany and about the way Burckhardt was responsible to Britain as one of the permanent members of the League Council, which he thought allowed Britain to intervene in the internal affairs of the Free City. However, the meeting ended with Hitler telling Burckhardt that he would order Forster to back down on the flag issue along with the plans to change the constitution of the Free City. Hitler was willing to make these concessions because he was considering annexing Austria in the near future and did not want trouble with Poland.

Upon his return to Danzig, Burckhardt told Gerard Shephard, the British Consul-General for Danzig, that his meeting with Hitler had left him "profoundly depressed", as he was shocked by Hitler's extremely hostile views towards the United Kingdom, which he did not think augured well for the peace of the world. In January 1938, all Jewish doctors and lawyers were forbidden to practice in the Free City, leading to the "Council of Three" to make representations over the violation of the Danzig constitution.

Burckhardt told the Poles that both the British and the French would prefer to withdraw the League of Nations mission from Danzig. Though Beck had often attacked the League of Nations high commissioners in Danzig as standing in the way of better German-Polish relations, he objected to the idea of pulling the League of Nations out of the Free City as that would reduce the "Danzig question" down to a bilateral German-Polish dispute with no international involvement.

=== Reaction to Nazi laws ===
In February 1938, Burckhardt's hopes were raised when Baron Ernst von Weizsäcker was appointed the State-Secretary at the Auswärtiges Amt. Weizsäcker had been the long-time German minister-plenipotentiary to Switzerland and was an old friend of Burckhardt, whose views were very close to his own. Burckhardt saw Weizsäcker as a moderating force who would secure the restoration of Germany as a great power without a world war.

As the Sudetenland crisis gathered pace in 1938, Hitler wished to maintain good relations with Poland. In July 1938, Burckhardt secured a triumph when Hitler finally ordered Foster to cease his plans to change the flag of the Free City, which Burckhardt believed was due to pressure from himself.

In August 1938, Alfred Duff Cooper, the First Lord of the Admiralty, visited Danzig, where he met with Burckhardt. Burckhardt described himself as "a ghost representing the League of Nations", but told Cooper that he had "grown most optimistic and is beginning to believe that the Nazi regime will come to a good end". Burckhardt concluded "it is possible that gradually the more violent and dangerous elements in the [Nazi] Party might be eliminated and give way to more modest and sober ones".

On 23 November 1938, Forster violated the Danzig constitution by introducing "the Law for Protection of German Blood and German Honor", which made sex between Aryans and non-Aryans a criminal offense. Burckhardt delivered a protest against the violation of the Danzig constitution, which guaranteed equal rights for all, and arranged for some of the better-off Danzig Jews to leave the Free City, but did no more.

=== Involvement in Nazi factionalism ===
In December 1938, Burchkhardt found himself caught up in the Nazi infighting as Erich Koch, the gauleiter of East Prussia, told him in a meeting in the antechamber of the Auswärtiges Amt that there was a "radical" group of Nazis that consisted of Forster along with the Foreign Minister Joachim von Ribbentrop, the Reichsführer-SS Henrich Himmler, the Propaganda minister Josef Goebbels, and SS Gruppenführer Hermann Behrends who were pressing for war against Poland.

Opposed to the "radical" group were a "moderate" group of Nazis led by Hermann Göring of the Four Year Plan Organisation who wanted Germany to be a greater power, but not at the price of causing a world war. Koch told Burckhardt: "We need the Poles, they need us. Göring will support you since you have arrived to calm the lunatics...an [sic] European war would be the end of everything, a madness. Colonies, what nonsense!...You will see how difficult it is to create animosity against the British; these are criminals who influence the Führer in this direction...never an [sic] European war, never! It is against Asia that one must fight!"

Göring and his ally Koch favored a "large solution" to the Danzig question under which the Free City would be allowed to rejoin Germany along with Poland returning the Polish Corridor to Germany (Poland would be allowed to retain Upper Silesia). In exchange, Göring and Koch wanted a German-Polish alliance and for Germany and Poland to jointly wage war against the Soviet Union. After the expected victory, Poland would be "compensated" for the loss of the Polish Corridor and its special rights in Danzig by being allowed to annex the entire Soviet Ukraine and to use the port of Odessa on the Black Sea as a replacement for the loss of access to the Baltic Sea. By contrast in the "large solution" scenario, Germany would take the rest of the Soviet Union after the anticipated victory.

In opposition to the "large solution" was the "little solution" advocated by Forster under which Germany would annex the Free City along with the Memelland held by Lithuania in the full expectation of causing a war with Poland and/or Lithuania. Koch told Burckhardt that he wanted his help, saying that Hitler respected him and that he could counter the "radicals" by using his influence with the Poles to facilitate Danzig rejoining Germany peacefully.

Unusually, Forster and Greiser co-operated with each other by smuggling arms into the Free City and training para-military forces. Forster and Greiser justified this violation of the Treaty of Versailles by arguing that the Polish Military Deport on the Westerplatte along with the Polish forces stationed at the railroad station and the post office were a threat to the German population of the Free City. The rumors of the gun-running into the Free City led to repeated Polish complaints to Burckhardt that Forster and Greiser were violating the Treaty of Versailles.

== The Danzig crisis ==
=== Conflicts with British diplomats ===
In early 1939, Burckhardt came into conflict with Gerald Shepherd, the new British Consul-General in Danzig. Shepherd complained that the Jewish community of the Free City was being subjected to increasingly severe persecution, and that Burckhardt's role was limited to making protests. During the Danzig crisis, Shepherd became convinced that Germany was aiming to start a war with Poland.

Burckhardt for his part in his reports to the British delegation at the League of Nations painted Shepherd as a man suffering from mental health problems, and stated that Shephard's personal dislike of Nazism had led to take an unduly grim view of German foreign policy. Contra Shepherd, Burckhardt argued that Hitler did not want a war with Poland, and that his goals were limited to securing the peaceful return of Danzig to Germany. The British Foreign Office and the prime minister, Neville Chamberlain, tended to put more faith in Burckhardt's reports than in Shepherd's.

In January 1939, Burckhardt told the British diplomat Roger Makins that he believed that "Hitler was guided by the prejudices of a middle class Austrian". Burckhardt argued that Hitler as an Austrian was a Polonophile under the grounds that King Jan Sobieski of Poland had saved Vienna from a siege by the Ottoman Empire in 1683, and claimed that for this reason Hitler would never attack Poland.

Tensions between Germany and Poland exploded into the open in late March 1939 with Poland ordering a partial mobilization in response to threatening German demands that the Free City be allowed to "go home to the Reich" or else Germany would go to war. On 31 March 1939, Chamberlain announced the famous "guarantee" of Poland, saying in the House of Commons that Britain would to go to war to defend Polish independence, though Chamberlain pointedly excluded the frontiers of Poland from the "guarantee".

On 28 April 1939, in a speech to the Reichstag, Hitler himself for the first time in public demanded Danzig rejoin Germany, saying "Danzig is a German city and wishes to belong to Germany". On 2 May 1939, Burckhardt reported to the League Council that he was "moderately optimistic" that Germany would not go to war, and stated that his major concern was Poland, which he feared would act in a rash manner that would cause a war. During the Danzig crisis, Burckhardt in his reports showed a strong preference for Greiser whom he depicted as a "moderate" Nazi opposed to the "extremist" Nazi Forster.

On 20 May 1939, three members of the Danzig SA became engaged a brawl with the chauffeur of the Polish High Commissioner for Danzig in the frontier village of Kalthof (now Kałdowo, Malbork County), which ended with the chauffeur pulling out his handgun and opening fire, killing one of the SA men, Max Grubnau. At the time, both Greiser and Forster told Burckhardt that the incident was of no importance as both men noted that incidents between Poles and Germans were common in the Free City. The killing of Grubnau later became in the summer of 1939 a major point for German media, which painted the Poles as violently anti-German.

=== Halifax's peace plan, French support for Danzig's return to Germany ===
On 21 May 1939 during a visit to the League Council in Geneva, Burckhardt met with the British Foreign Secretary Lord Halifax, who was in Geneva to attend the spring session of the League of Nations. Halifax outlined the British compromise solution to the Danzig crisis under which Danzig would remain a Free City, but would be represented in the German Reichstag. The British peace plan also called for Germany to take over the task of representing the Free City abroad, but for the rest of the Polish special rights in Danzig, such as control of the customs service, to remain. Halifax asked for Burckhardt to visit both Berlin and Warsaw to present the peace plan as he believed that Burckhardt was a man respected by both the Poles and the Germans.

Burckhardt expressed approval of Halifax's peace plan, but stated that the "chauvinism" of Polish public opinion would probably lead to its rejection by Poland. During the same visit to Geneva, Burckhardt met with the French foreign minister Georges Bonnet, who told him that he favored the immediate return of the Free City to Germany and ordered Burckhardt to work to that end.

On his way back to Danzig, Burckhardt stopped by in Warsaw to see Colonel Beck. Burckhardt noted the two autographed photographs of Hitler and Mussolini that were normally displayed on the piano in Beck's house were now gone as Beck stated that he did not consider Hitler and Mussolini to be his friends anymore. Burckhardt was addressed by Beck as if he were giving orders as he asked him to see Hitler to request he restrain Forster and Greiser.

=== Heated meeting with Ribbentrop ===
After visiting Warsaw and Berlin, Burckhardt met with Matkins to present his assessment of the Danzig crisis. Burckhardt stated that he trusted Weizsäcker, and that Weizsäcker had told him that Hitler would take no action against Poland until after the annual Nazi Party rally in Nuremberg, which occurred every September. Burckhardt stated that, based upon his contacts in Berlin and Warsaw, he believed that neither side wanted to see the Danzig crisis escalate into war.

However, Burckhardt went on to say that the Sanation military dictatorship in Poland was unpopular, and the Sanation regime might be overthrown if its prestige was damaged too much in the crisis. Burckhardt depicted the Polish people as the primary problem in the crisis, saying that during his visit to Warsaw he had "detected certain symptoms of Polish imperialism and formed the impression that Polish aims were of a wide scope." The Foreign Office wrote that Burckhardt had strong prejudices against the Poles, but stated it did not affect his "impartiality".

Per the request of Colonel Beck, Burkhardt visited Berlin where he met Ribbentrop. The Burckhardt-Ribbentrop meeting was described as "heated" as Ribbentrop tried to bully Burckhardt. Burckhardt was normally described as having an "Alpine" temperament, as he rarely expressed much emotion while looking as imposing as the Alps, and his animated discussion with Ribbentrop was most unusual for him. Burckhardt informed Ribbentrop that, however much he supported Germany's claim to Danzig, that Germany should not invade Poland, as both Britain and France would declare war.

Ribbentrop dismissed Burckhardt's concerns and stated that both France and Britain would do nothing if the Reich attacked Poland as he confidently stated that any French government that declared war on Germany would fall. Ribbentrop told Burckhardt that the Paris correspondent of the Deutsche Allgemeine Zeitung, a Herr Krug von Nidda, had just toured France and reported that the French people were overwhelmingly against war for the defense of Poland.

=== Final mediations ===
Burckhardt (second left) at the guests of honour in 1959, alongside Joseph Goebbels and Anton Dichtel.

On 3 June 1939, Greiser handed a note to the Polish high commissioner to Danzig, Marian Chodacki, accusing the Polish customs inspectors of "bad behavior" and asked for all of the Polish customs inspectors to leave the Free City forever, a demand that was rejected by the Poles. As usual, Burckhardt, as the High Commissioner, was called upon to mediate the dispute.

Later in June 1939, Burckhardt complained that Nazi "extremists" were trying to provoke the Poles, complaining that the "Week of German Culture" launched in the last week of June 1939 was intentionally outrageous. The "Week of German Culture" was intended to emphasise the German character of Danzig and some of the claims made during the Week of German Culture, such as that Danzig had never been the Polish city of Gdańsk and always been Danzig, were considered highly offensive in Poland.

Dr. Josef Geobbels, the Reich Minister of Propaganda was the guest of honor for the Week of German Culture. In his speech at the conclusion of the Week of German Culture, Goebbels stated that Danzig would soon "come home to the Reich" and that: "I have come to fortify you in your resolution. Germany is everywhere that there are Germans. Only the jealousy, the defiance, the stupidity of other nations oppose you. Then again, political frontiers can be displaced for a time. The frontiers which are drawn by language, race and blood are fixed eternally". Burckhardt was relieved that the Poles chose to not make any issue out of Goebbels's provocative speech as Colonel Beck accepted the claim of the Reich government that Goebbels was expressing his personal views and not those of the German government.

=== German gun-running ===
In his reports from July 1939, Burckhardt noted that Danzig officials were bringing in arms from Germany in violation of the Treaty of Versailles which had declared the Free City to be a demilitarized zone. However, Burckhardt stated that Forster had assured him that the gun-running was only a defensive measure, as he feared that the Poles would attempt to annex the Free City, and that Hitler did not want war with Poland. On 20 July 1939, Forster, as a part of a deception effort, stated to Burckhardt that the crisis was not that serious, and that Germany was willing to wait for the next two years for Poland to give permission for the Free City to rejoin Germany.

As intended, Burckhardt reported this statement to the governments of Poland, France and the United Kingdom, which gave the impression the Danzig crisis was only a minor issue that could be settled sometime over the next two years. The Danzig issue was a pretext for Germany to invade Poland, and the last thing the German government wanted was for Poland to give its assent for Danzig to rejoin Germany.

During the Danzig crisis, the negotiations between the Free City and the Poles over the issue of the Polish customs officers overseen by Burckhardt were held in "a tense and violent atmosphere". Polish customs officers were the subject of continuing harassment, insults and violence by the Danzig Nazis, who sought to make it impossible for them to perform their work, making gun-running into Danzig easier and allowing a massive amount of arms and ammunition to be smuggled into the Free City via its harbour in the spring and summer of 1939. On 4 August 1939, Colonel Beck issued a note stating that Poland was willing to go to war if the harassment of Polish customs officers did not cease immediately.

Burckhardt in his assessment blamed the Poles for escalating the crisis, as he maintained that Beck's note was unacceptable in making threats of war. Burckhardt continued to take Weizsäcker's word at face value and accepted Weizsäcker's claims that Germany did not want a war and that the harassment of the customs officers was merely a way to pressure Poland to allow Danzig to "go home to the Reich" peacefully.

=== Kehlsteinhaus meeting with Hitler ===
On 10 August 1939, Forster told Burckhardt that Hitler wanted to see him at the Berghof high up in the Bavarian Alps and that he was not to tell the Poles, the French and the British about the secret invitation. At 9 am the next day, Burckhardt was picked up at Danzig airport in Hitler's personal air plane, a Fokker-Wolff Condor 200 named Immelmann III. During the flight to Berchtesgaden, Forster told Burckhardt about his supposed exploits as a "street fighter" before he came to Danzig as he stated that he was not just a high school teacher, but a successful "street fighter". Burckhardt stated that he found Forster's behavior very "strange", as Forster looked and sounded very much like the middle class teacher that he was, and he found Forster's accounts of being a macho "street fighter" hard to believe.

On 11 August 1939, Burckhardt held his secret meeting with Hitler. Hitler praised Burckhardt for his work in trying to peacefully resolve the crisis and claimed that the crisis would have been settled had it not been for the Polish "ultimatum" of 4 August 1939, which Hitler claimed had escalated the crisis to a dangerous point. Hitler blamed the crisis on the Polish and French newspapers which had "trumpeted Polish courage", which Hitler told Burckhardt made a diplomatic solution to the Danzig crisis almost impossible. Hitler told Burckhardt that he made "reasonable" offers to resolve the crisis and blamed the Poles for having "definitely ruled out" his peace offers with the "ultimatum". Hitler stated that he was willing to wait for Poland to change its policies towards Danzig, but if the Poles did not, then Poland would be "smashed". When Burckhardt stated that this would mean world war as both France and Britain would declare war on the Reich, Hitler replied that he was ready for a world war and was quite willing to accept a war where millions would die if that was the price of bringing Danzig back into Germany.

During the meeting, Hitler made his famous comment to Burckhardt: "Everything I undertake is directed against Russia. If those in the West are too stupid and too blind to see this, then I shall be forced to come to an understanding with the Russians to beat the West, and then after its defeat, turn with all my concerted force against Russia". Finally, Hitler told Burckhardt that he still wanted a settlement with Britain, and was prepared to "guarantee" the continual existence of the entire British empire in exchange for Britain renouncing the "guarantee" of Poland.

The British historian D.C. Watt wrote that Burckhardt's account of his meeting with Hitler on 11 August set on the dramatic vista of the Kehlsteinhaus was "scored like a Wagnerian opera" as he described Hitler as "angry", "crescendo", "fortissimo", "furious", "tapping the table", and engaged in "hysterical laughter". Burckhardt remarked upon Hitler's "femininity" during the secret meeting, as he did not find his "hysterical" behavior to be very masculine. Burckhardt described Hitler as "older and whiter" and as "nervous, pathetic and almost shaken at times", as he stated that Hitler appeared to him like a man very conscious of having turned 50 earlier that year, and troubled by the prospect of growing old.

Hitler's primary demand at this summit with Burckhardt was for appointment of a "German-speaking Englishman" as meditator to end the crisis. The particular "German-speaking Englishman" whom Hitler had in mind was Field Marshal Sir Edmund Ironside. Ironside was a close friend of the military historian General J. F. C. Fuller, who was also a member of the national executive of the British Union of Fascists. Fuller had attended the party for Hitler's 50th birthday on 20 April 1939 as a guest of honor, and Hitler knew from talking to Fuller that Ironside shared many of his views, in particular supporting Germany's claim to the Free City. Hitler expected Ironside as a mediator to rule in favor of Germany's claim to Danzig, and for Poland to reject such a ruling, which he believed in turn would cause Britain to renounce the "guarantee" of Poland.

After his meeting with Hitler, Burckhardt as expected went on to Geneva where he submitted an extensive account on his meeting at the Kehlsteinhaus to the "committee of three" at the League of Nations, namely the British, French and Swedish ambassadors to the League. Since it was a mystery in London and Paris as to just what Hitler was planning to do, Burckhardt's account was the subject of intense study in both London and Paris and was submitted to the cabinets of both governments. Burckhardt expressed his own view that the Danzig crisis "could have been settled if the Poles had not sent their ultimatum". The Chamberlain government was taken with Hitler's request for a "German-speaking Englishman" to serve as a mediator to end the crisis, but Ironside's friendship with Fuller, along with rumors that he shared Fuller's fascist politics, led to Ironside being considered an unsuitable mediator.

Hitler's purpose of the Berchtesgaden summit was to sow distrust between Warsaw and London as Colonel Beck believed that Burckhardt was serving British interests at the summit as a part of a bid to reach a settlement of the Danzig crisis at the expense of Poland. The meeting at the Kelhsteinhaus caused much anger in Warsaw, as Burckhardt had not informed Colonel Beck that he was going to meet Hitler in advance. Chodacki had an unpleasant meeting with Burckhardt where he chided him for not telling the Polish government about his summit in Berchtesgaden, as he reminded him that his duties as the League of Nations commissioner required him to be neutral. In response, Burckhardt stated he had "disclosed that he regarded the Polish ultimatum as responsible for the present difficult situation and had told Herr Hitler so". Someone in the Quai d'Orsay leaked an account of the Burckhardt-Hitler meeting to the Paris Soir newspaper, which caused an international sensation as the version of the meeting published in the Paris Soir was edited in such a manner as to suggest that Hitler was insane.

=== Visit of the Schleswig-Holstein ===
On 15 August 1939, Burckhardt was informed that the old German battleship Schleswig-Holstein would be sailing from the German naval base at Kiel to Danzig for a "friendship visit" later that month, a report that Burckhardt did not see as an escalation of the crisis. He noted that the Poles were unhappy about the prospect of a German battleship weighing its anchors in Danzig harbour, but were willing to accept the Schleswig-Holstein making its "friendship visit" to Danzig.

On 31 August 1939, at 11 p.m. Gestapo burst into Burckhardt's house and put Burckhardt under house arrest. Soon after that Forster arrived and stated that the Treaty of Versailles has been torn by Hitler and Burckhardt had only two hours to leave Danzig. Forster stated to Burckhart that the swastika would soon fly over Danzig as the Free City was about to "go home to the Reich in the next day or two, and he already arrested all of the Polish commissioners. Forster added that: "Personally, I have nothing against you". Burckhardt then left by car for Lithuania, and Nazi Germany would subsequently annex Danzig.

=== Legacy ===
Burckhardt despite his limited powers as the League of Nations high commissioner played a major role in the Danzig crisis. He was well regarded in London and the Chamberlain cabinet always paid close attention to Burckhardt's statements during the crisis. By contrast, Burckhardt was seen as a tool in Berlin by which Britain might be detached from its commitment to defend Poland. The American historian Herbert Levine wrote that Burckhardt was a victim of his colossal ego as he "...seems to have fallen victim to the conceit that he could almost single-handedly stop an Anglo-German conflict". Levine wrote that Burckhardt's anti-Polish views which led him to cast Poland as the aggressor in the Danzig crisis and his repeated statements that "the Nazi regime might yet come to a good end" played a major in the "hesitancy" of British policy during much of the crisis.

Following this period as High Commissioner, he returned to his professorship in Geneva for the rest of World War II (1939–1945). While in that position, he was also active in a leading role in the ICRC, traveling to Germany several times to negotiate for better treatment of civilians and prisoners, in part using the contacts gained during his two years as High Commissioner in Danzig.

== Involvement with Nazism ==
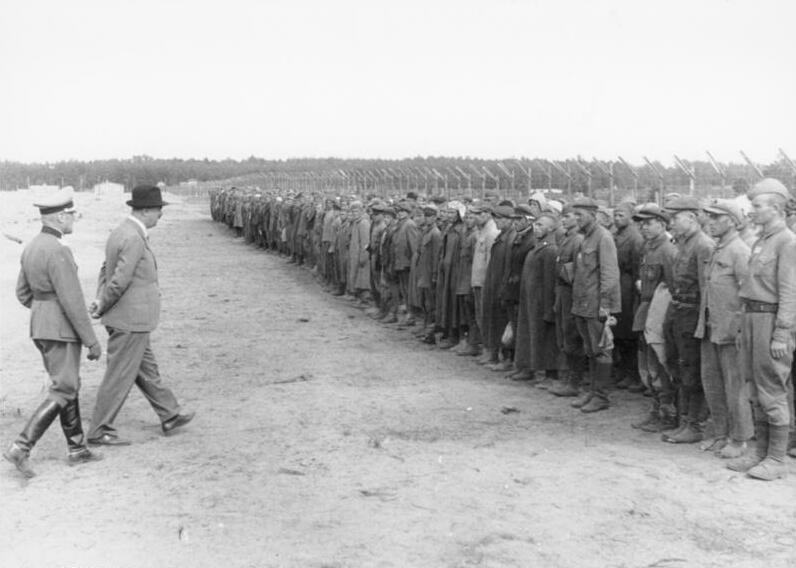
Burckhardt visiting Camp Fünfeichen in August 1941

After the war, he became President of the ICRC, serving from 1945 to 1948. Organizationally, he increased the integration of the international Red Cross institutions and the national Red Cross Societies. Politically, his term was controversial as he maintained the ICRC's existing policy of strict neutrality in international disputes, which led to the ICRC refusing to condemn the Nazis as their atrocities came to light officially. His strong anticommunism even led him to considering Nazism the lesser evil.

He meanwhile simultaneously served from 1945 to 1949 as the Swiss envoy in Paris, with residence at the Hôtel de Besenval. He opposed the Nuremberg trials, calling them "Jewish revenge." On his watch, the ICRC provided documents that helped many high-level Nazis, including Adolf Eichmann and Josef Mengele, escape Europe and evade justice for their war crimes in World War II.

== Personal life and death ==
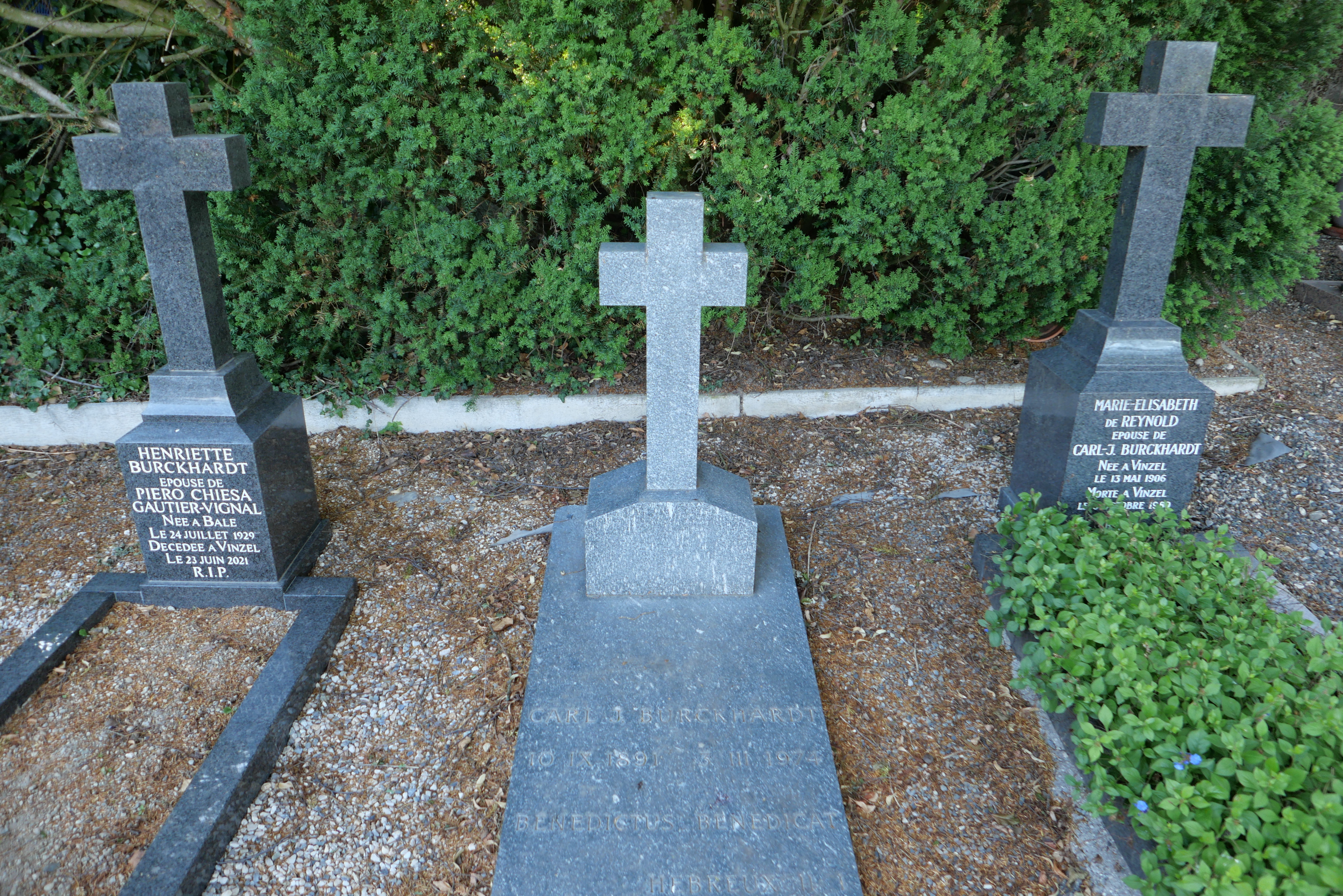
The graves of Burckhard (centre), his wife (right) and their daughter Henriette (1929–2021)

The Red Cross' stance during the war did not fully come to light until it opened its archives from the period in 1994. After 1949, he returned to his academic career, publishing a number of books on history over the next several decades. In 1954, he was awarded the Peace Prize of the German Book Trade. He died in 1974 in Vinzel. The slab of his grave at the cemetery of Vinzel bears an inscription:

"BENEDICTUS BENEDICAT" (“May the Blessed One give a blessing”)

The Christian message is commonly used as an opening grace of thanksgiving before a meal. However, the grave slab incorrectly attributes it to the Epistle to the Hebrews (2,1).

== Works ==
- Der Berner Schultheiss Charles Neuhaus (1925)
- Richelieu (4 vols., 1935–67)
- Gestalten und Mächte (1941)
- Reden und Aufzeichnungen (1952)
- Meine Danziger Mission, 1937–1939 (1960)
- GW (6 vols., 1971)
- Memorabilien (1977)
- Briefe: 1908–1974 (1986)

== Sources ==
- Clark, Elizabeth (Autumn 2017). "Borderland of the Mind: The Free City of Danzig and the Sovereignty Question". German Politics & Society. 35 (3): 24–37. doi:10.3167/gps.2017.350302.
- Levine, Herbert S. (September 1973). "The Mediator: Carl J. Burckhardt's Efforts to Avert a Second World War". The Journal of Modern History. 45 (3): 439–455. doi:10.1086/241023. S2CID 154745560.
- Praźmowska, Anita (2011). "Poland, the 'Danzig Question', and the Outbreak of the Second World War". In Frank McDonough (ed.). The Origins of the Second World War: An International Perspective. London: Continuum. pp. 394–408.
- Overy, Richard; Wheatcroft, Andrew (1989). The Road to War. London: Penguin.
- Rothkirchen, Livia (2006). The Jews of Bohemia and Moravia: Facing the Holocaust. Lincoln: University of Nebraska Press. ISBN 978-0-8032-0502-4.
- Roland Ruffieux: "Burckhardt, Carl Jacob" in German, French and Italian in the online Historical Dictionary of Switzerland, 2005-02-16.
- Watt, Donald Cameron (1989). How War Came The Immediate Origins of the Second World War 1938-1939. London: Heinemann.
- Weinberg, Gerhard (1980). The Foreign Policy of Hitler's Germany Volume 2 Starting World War Two 1937-1939. Chicago: University of Chicago Press.
