= List of ambassadors of the United Kingdom to Iceland =

British Ambassador to Iceland Sendiherra Bretlands á Íslandi
- Royal arms of His Majesty's Government
- Incumbent; Jane Stevens since September 2026
- Reports to: Foreign Secretary
- Residence: Reykjavík
- Appointer: The King on advice of the prime minister
- Term length: At His Majesty's pleasure
- Inaugural holder: Charles Howard Smith; First Envoy extraordinary to Iceland; Andrew Gilchrist; First Ambassador to Iceland
- Formation: 1939; Envoys extraordinary 1957; Ambassadors extraordinary
- Website: www.gov.uk/world/iceland

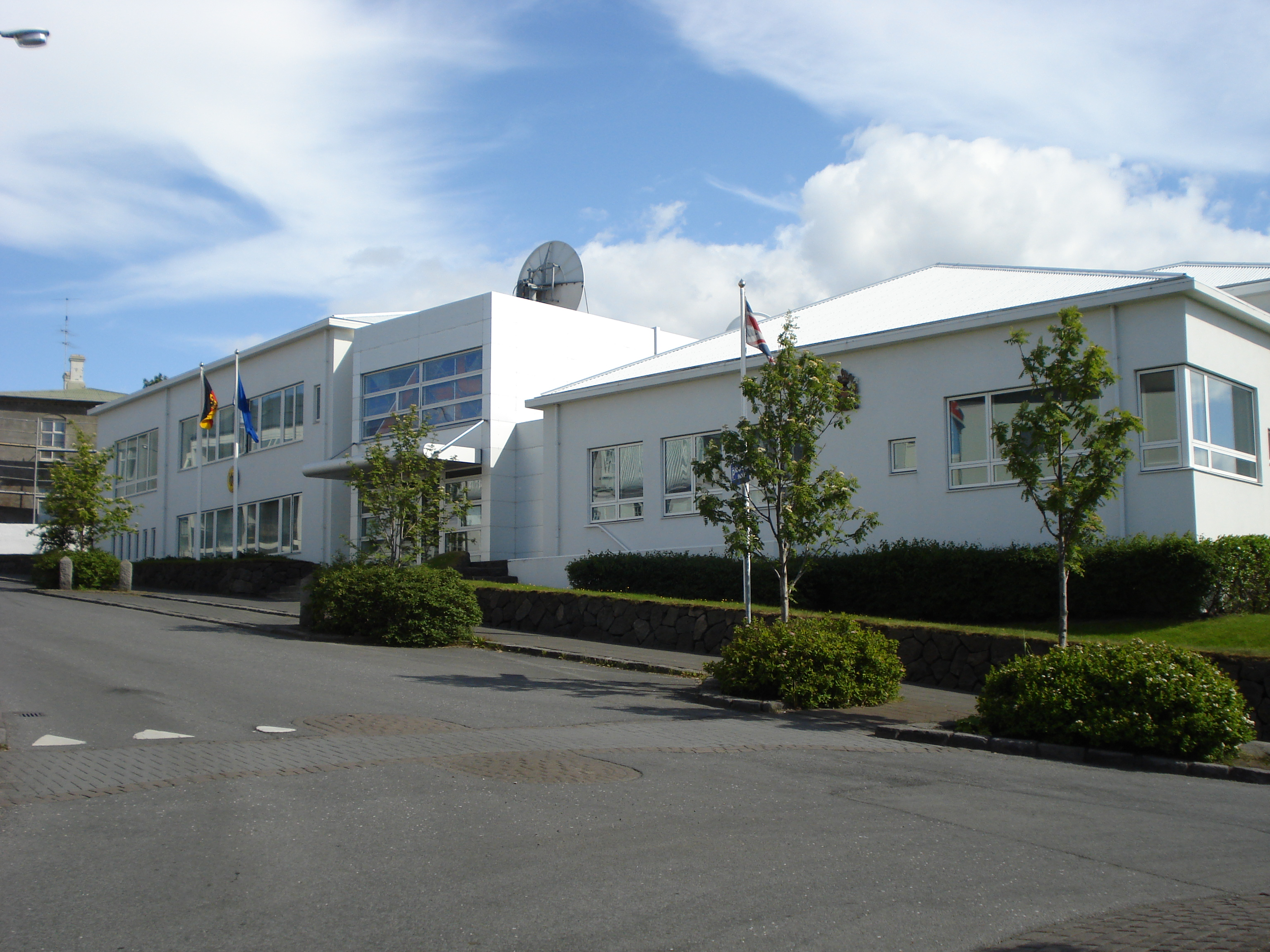
British Embassy, Reykjavík

The ambassador of the United Kingdom to Iceland is the United Kingdom's foremost diplomatic representative in Iceland, and head of the UK's diplomatic mission in Iceland. Their official title is His Britannic Majesty's Ambassador to the Republic of Iceland.

Both the British embassy and the ambassador's residence are in Reykjavík. The British embassy shares a site and several common facilities with the German embassy.

== History ==
The UK's first representative to Iceland was appointed during the Second World War. Until then, Iceland had been a dependency of Denmark and then, since 1918, a sovereign state in a personal union with Denmark, with Denmark handling Icelandic foreign policy. On 9 April 1940 Nazi Germany invaded Denmark and the British Minister, Charles Smith, who had been appointed only six months previously, and his staff were expelled. Immediately, Iceland declared itself responsible for its own foreign affairs, and declared strict neutrality.

To prevent the emergence of a pro-Nazi government in Reykjavík, and help fight the Battle of the Atlantic, the United Kingdom swiftly occupied Iceland on 10 May 1940. With the British troops, Charles Howard Smith arrived as envoy to the Icelandic government. Smith died in his post in 1942, and was replaced by Gerald Shepherd (later Sir Gerald) the following year. In 1944, still at the height of the war, Iceland declared its full independence from Denmark, through the constitutional referendum held.

Although the diplomatic mission in Iceland is not a large one, nor particularly prestigious, its importance during the Cold War was disproportionate, due to its strategic location in the North Atlantic. More crucial to British interests was the string of diplomatic and economic disputes related to fishing rights, which culminated in the Cod Wars.

== List of heads of mission ==
=== Envoys extraordinary and ministers plenipotentiary ===
- 1940–1942: Charles Howard Smith
- 1943–1947: Sir Gerald Shepherd
- 1947–1950: Charles Baxter
- 1950–1953: John Greenway
- 1953–1956: James Henderson
- 1956–1957: Andrew Gilchrist

=== Ambassadors extraordinary and plenipotentiary ===
- 1957–1959: Andrew Gilchrist
- 1959–1962: Charles Stewart
- 1962–1965: Basil Boothby
- 1966–1970: Aubrey Halford-MacLeod
- 1970–1975: John McKenzie
- 1975–1981: Kenneth East
- 1981–1983: William McQuillan
- 1983–1986: Richard Thomas
- 1986–1989: Mark Chapman
- 1989–1991: Sir Richard Best
- 1991–1993: Patrick Wogan
- 1993–1996: Michael Hone
- 1996–2000: James McCulloch
- 2001–2004: John Culver
- 2004–2008: Alp Mehmet
- 2008–2012: Ian Whitting
- 2012–2016: Stuart Gill
- 2016–2021: Michael Nevin
- 2021-2026: Dr Bryony Mathew
- 2026–present: Jane Stevens
