= Charles Howard Smith =

British diplomat (1888–1942)

Charles Howard Smith CMG

British Minister to Denmark
- In office 1939–1940
- Preceded by: The Hon. Sir Patrick Ramsay
- Succeeded by: Sir Alec Randall

British Minister to Iceland
- In office 1940–1942
- Succeeded by: Sir Gerald Shepherd

Personal details
- Born: 17 May 1888
- Died: 23 July 1942 (aged 54)
- Occupation: Diplomat

Charles Howard Smith CMG (17 May 1888 – 23 July 1942) was a British diplomat.

Smith was educated at Winchester and Brasenose College, Oxford, before joining the British Foreign Office in 1912. He remained in the diplomatic service throughout World War I and the inter-war period, during which he was private secretary to the then Under-Secretary of State for Foreign Affairs Cecil Harmsworth MP (later Lord Harmsworth) 1920–22. Smith was himself eventually appointed Assistant Under-Secretary for Foreign Affairs in 1933. In October 1939 he took up the position of Minister to Copenhagen, but was forced to leave upon the German invasion of Denmark in April 1940. Following his departure from Copenhagen he became the first British Minister to Reykjavik. He died in his post in July 1942.

Diplomatic posts
Preceded by The Hon. Sir Patrick Ramsay	British Minister to Denmark; 1939–1940	Succeeded by Sir Alec Randall
Preceded by New Title	British Minister to Iceland; 1940–1942	Succeeded by Sir Gerald Shepherd
