= Paul Ruegger =

Swiss Red Cross President

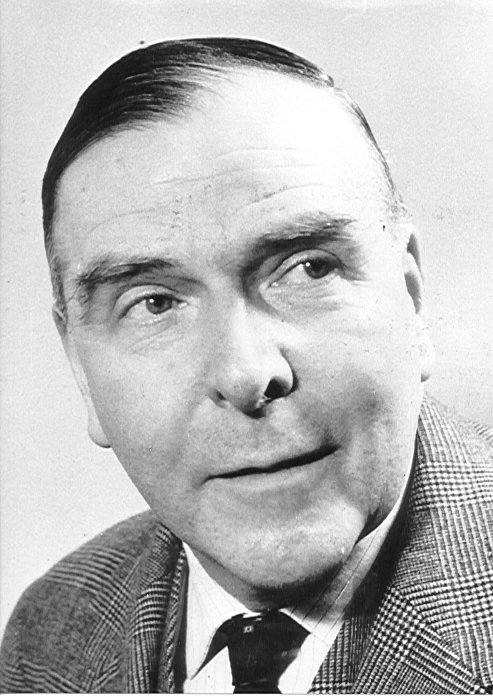

President of the International Committee of the Red Cross
- In office 10 February 1948 – 1 September 1955
- Preceded by: Carl Jacob Burckhardt
- Succeeded by: Léopold Boissier

Personal details
- Born: 14 August 1897. Lucerne, Switzerland
- Died: 9 August 1988 (aged 90) Florence, Italy

Paul Ruegger (14 August 1897 – 8 August 1988) was a Swiss lawyer and diplomat who served as President of the International Committee of the Red Cross from 1948 to 1955.
