= Gerald Shepherd =

British diplomat (1886–1967)

Sir Gerald Shepherd KCMG

British Ambassador to Iceland
- In office 1943–1947
- Preceded by: Charles Howard Smith
- Succeeded by: Charles Baxter

Personal details
- Born: 20 November 1886 Torquay, Devon
- Died: 11 November 1967 (aged 80) Ontario, Canada
- Children: 2
- Occupation: Diplomat

Sir Edward Henry Gerald Shepherd (20 November 1886 – 11 November 1967) was a British diplomat who served as ambassador to Iceland from 1943 to 1947.

== Early life and education ==
Shepherd was born in 1886 in Torquay, Devon, the son of Edward Ernest Shepherd. He was educated at Eastman's Royal Navy Academy; at King' s College School, Wimbledon; at the Lycee d'Orleans; at King's College, London; and at Göttingen and Freiburg Universities.

== Career ==
After having passed the competitive examination, Shepherd entered the consular service, and was posted to the United States where he served as vice-consul at New York from 1913 to 1914; at Philadelphia in 1915; at New York again from 1916 to 1918; and then at San Francisco from 1919 to 1920.

From 1921 to 1923, he was consul-general in Liberia, acted as chargé d’ affaires there, while also consul for Fernando Poo and its dependencies from 1922 to 1923. After serving at Le Havre and Riga, he returned to New York where he spent eight years as consul, followed by postings to Danzig as consul-general from 1938 to 1939.

While in Danzig in 1938, Shepherd sent dispatches recommending Britain take a firm stance against German demands on Poland for the annexation of the Free City of Danzig to Germany which was then under the supervision of the League of Nations, arguing that if granted, the absorption of further territory of Poland would inevitably follow. Proved correct by subsequent events, according to The Times, "His spirited and sustained expression of this view, which was shared by many of his diplomatic colleagues, brought him into conflict throughout June and July with Lord Halifax by whom such unwelcome and determined advice was held to be in excess of Sir Gerald's role as Consul-General".

From 1939 to 1940, Shepherd served in Amsterdam. When Germany invaded the Netherlands in 1940, he organised the evacuation of over 500 British men and women from Holland informing them that if they did not leave by the last boat the government had no further responsibility. During the embarkation air raid alarms sounded and exchanges of gunfire were heard between German paratroopers and Dutch soldiers. Shepherd remained as the last British national to leave The Hague.

After returning to Britain, Shepherd was appointed assistant to the undersecretary for the colonies, and was transferred to Canada, and then the United States, where he served as the British representative at the Children's Overseas Reception Board from 1940 to 1942, leading the discussions concerning the arrangements for the evacuation of British children to Canada with the British High Commissioner.

In 1943, he was appointed head of the British Mission in Iceland as envoy extraordinary and minister plenipotentiary. In 1944, when Iceland declared its full independence from Denmark, he was appointed Special Ambassador at the inauguration of the Republic of Iceland. In 1946, he oversaw the handover, free of charge, of Reykjavík Airport which had been built and occupied by the British during the war to support military activities. He remained in the post until his retirement from the diplomatic service in 1947.

After retiring from the service, Shepherd went to Bermuda where, from 1952 to 1960, he worked at the colonial secretariat, serving for five years as commissioner for the treatment of offenders, before he transferred to the Treasury, a position he held from 1961 to 1962. While in Bermuda, he also served as the French consular agent from 1956 to 1958, and was made Officer of the Légion d’honneur de France in 1961.

== Personal life and death ==
Shepherd married Militza Meyer in 1927, and they had one son and one daughter.

Shepherd died on 11 November 1967 in Ontario, Canada, aged 80.

== Honours ==
- Companion of the Order of St Michael and St George (CMG) in the 1939 Birthday Honours, and promoted to Knight Commander (KCMG) in the 1946 Birthday Honours.
- Légion d’honneur de France in 1961.

== See also ==
- Iceland–United Kingdom relations

Diplomatic posts
Preceded by Charles Howard Smith	British Ambassador to Iceland; 1943–1947	Succeeded by Charles Baxter
