= Embassy of the United Kingdom, Reykjavík =

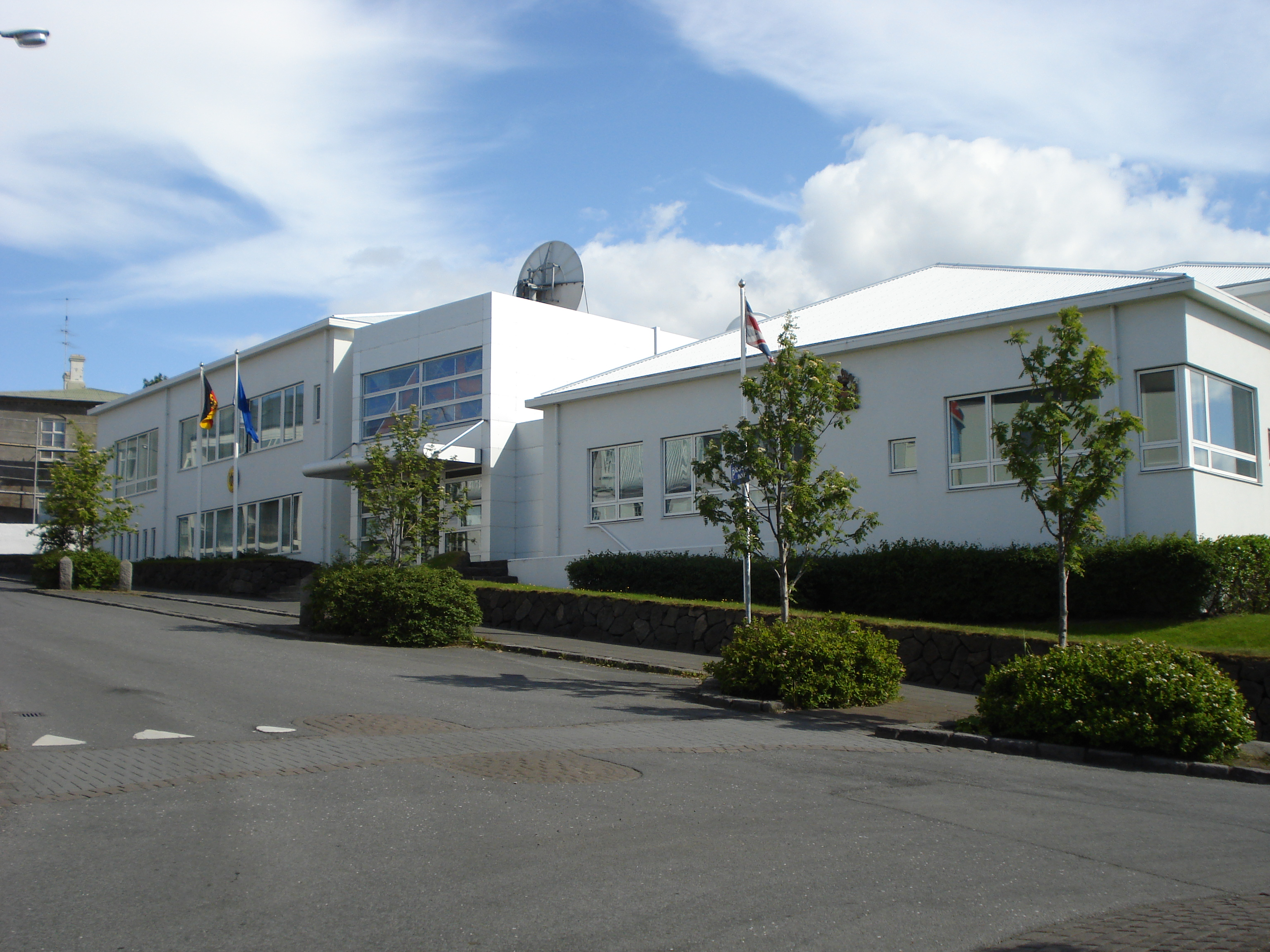
British Embassy, Reykjavík
- Location: Reykjavík, Iceland
- Address: Laufásvegur 31, 101 Reykjavík, Iceland
- Coordinates: 64.1428°N 21.9372°W
- Ambassador: Bryony Mathew
- Website: British Embassy, Reykjavík

The Embassy of the United Kingdom in Reykjavík is the chief diplomatic mission of the United Kingdom in Iceland. The embassy is located on Laufásvegur street in the Miðborg district of the city. Since the 1990s, the building has been shared with the German Embassy. The current British Ambassador to Iceland is Bryony Mathew.

== History ==
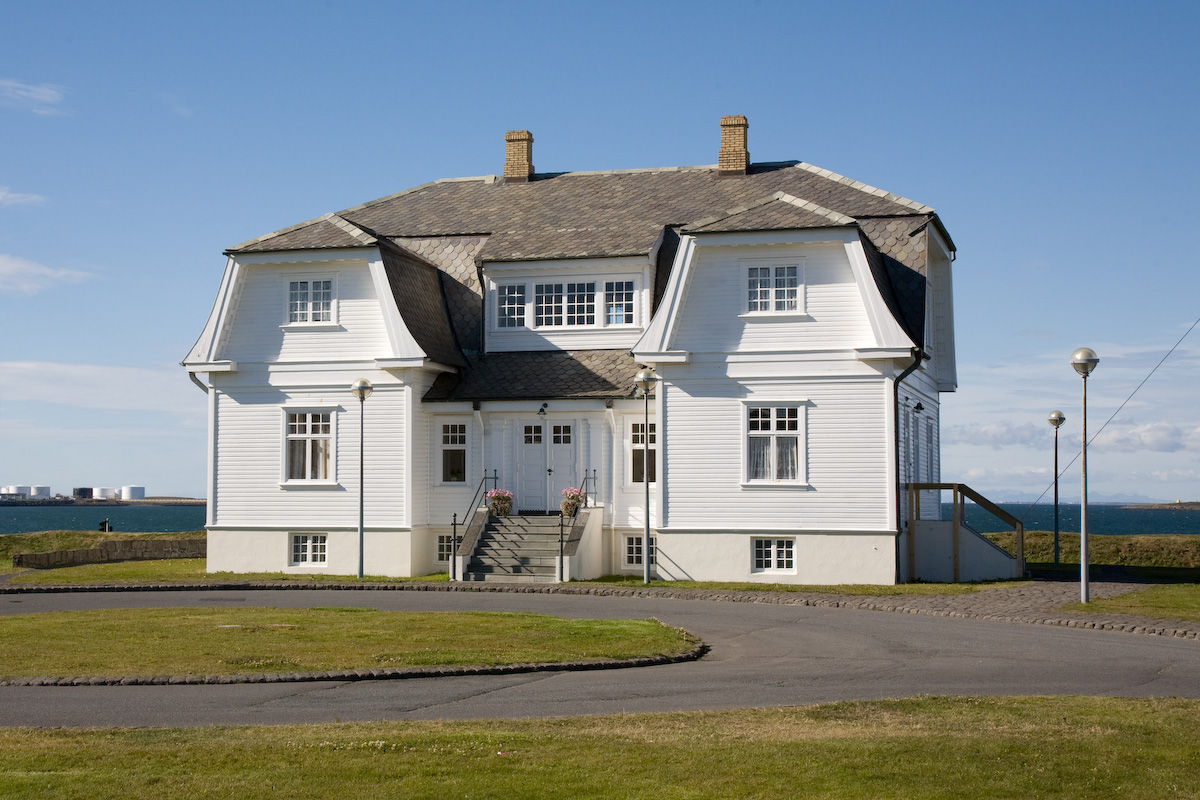
Höfði, the former home of the British Embassy

Britain's first representative to Iceland, Charles Smith, was appointed on 8 May 1940 during the Second World War. He arrived accompanying the British troops who occupied Iceland. Until then, Iceland had been a dependency of Denmark.

The home of the first British Embassy was Höfði (best known as the location for the 1986 Reykjavík Summit meeting of Ronald Reagan and Mikhail Gorbachev). In the 1950s the embassy was moved to its current location on Laufásvegur street. In 1968, the British Government bought Laufásvegur 31 and the old farmhouse which was there was donated to the Reykjavik Museum and moved to the heritage site at Árbæjarsafn.

When the embassy was redeveloped in the 1990s, it was decided that the location was too large for Britain's needs and so it looked for another partner to share it with. At the same time the German government was also looking for a new location and so agreed to share building and facilities at Laufásvegur 31. It is thought to be the first time a building was constructed to house two embassies. It was opened on 2 June 1996, in the presence of Malcolm Rifkind, Werner Hoyer, and Halldór Ásgrímsson. A plaque inside reads "the first purpose built co-located British-German chancery building in Europe".

== See also ==
- Iceland–United Kingdom relations
- List of diplomatic missions in Iceland
- List of Ambassadors of the United Kingdom to Iceland
