= List of diplomatic missions in Iceland =

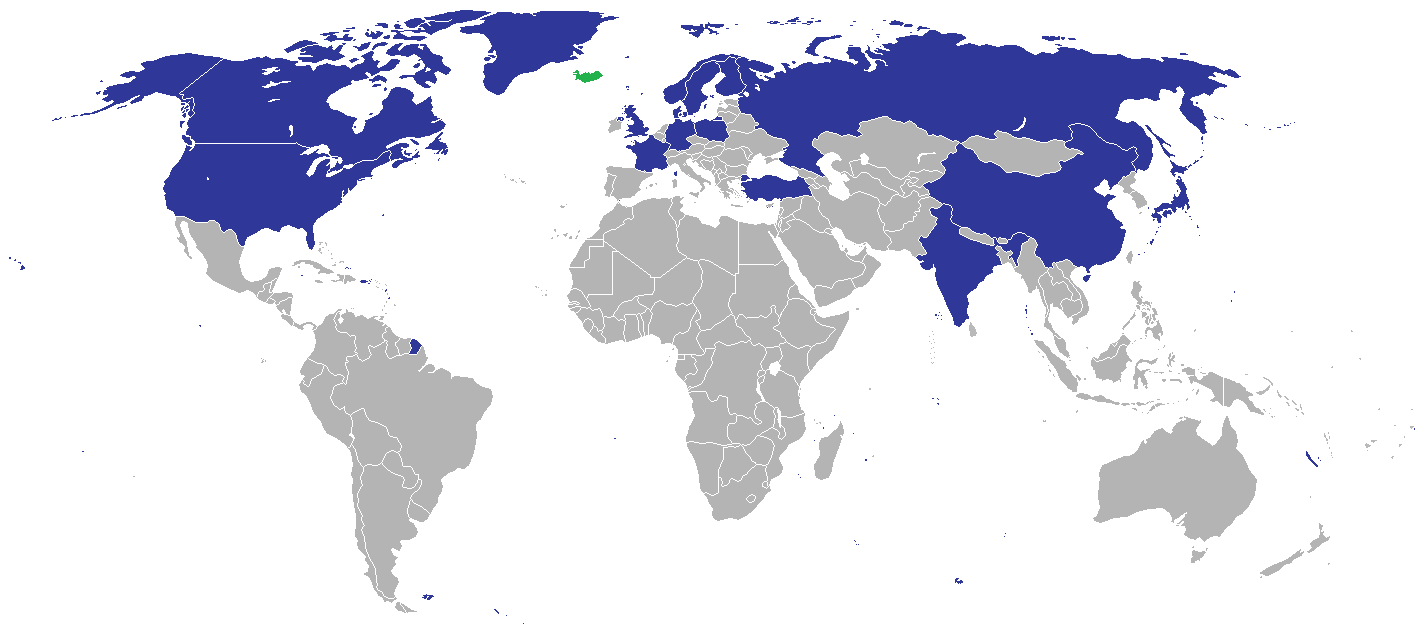
Diplomatic missions in Iceland

This is a list of diplomatic missions in Iceland. There are currently 15 embassies in Reykjavík.

== Embassies in Reykjavík ==
Country	Mission type	Photo
Canada	Embassy	
China	Embassy	
Denmark	Embassy	
Finland	Embassy	
France	Embassy	
Germany	Embassy	
India	Embassy	-
Japan	Embassy	-
Norway	Embassy	
Poland	Embassy	
Russia	Embassy	
Sweden	Embassy	-
Turkey	Embassy	-
United Kingdom	Embassy	
United States	Embassy	

== Representative offices ==
Country	Mission type	Photo
European Union	Delegation	-
Faroe Islands	Representative office	-
Greenland	Representative office	-

== Non-resident embassies accredited to Iceland ==
=== Resident in Berlin, Germany ===
1. Burundi
2. Cape Verde
3. Mali

=== Resident in Copenhagen, Denmark ===
1. Australia
2. Austria
3. Bangladesh
4. Burkina Faso
5. Croatia
6. Cyprus
7. Georgia
8. Lithuania
9. Mexico
10. Nepal
11. Niger
12. Romania
13. Slovenia
14. Uganda
15. Vietnam

=== Resident in Dublin, Ireland ===
1. Kuwait
2. Lesotho
3. Nigeria

=== Resident in London, United Kingdom ===
1. Azerbaijan
2. Bahrain
3. Brunei
4. Costa Rica
5. Dominican Republic
6. Eswatini
7. Gambia
8. Guinea
9. Guyana
10. Jordan
11. Kazakhstan
12. Kyrgyzstan
13. Laos
14. Luxembourg
15. Malawi
16. Montenegro
17. Oman
18. Panama
19. Paraguay
20. Qatar
21. Senegal
22. Seychelles
23. Singapore
24. Somalia
25. Togo
26. United Arab Emirates
27. Uzbekistan

=== Resident in Oslo, Norway ===
1. Afghanistan
2. Argentina
3. Belgium
4. Bosnia and Herzegovina
5. Brazil
6. Bulgaria
7. Chile
8. Czechia
9. Egypt
10. Estonia
11. Ghana
12. Greece
13. Hungary
14. Indonesia
15. Iran
16. Ireland
17. Israel
18. Italy
19. Latvia
20. Morocco
21. Netherlands
22. North Macedonia
23. Palestine
24. Peru
25. Philippines
26. Portugal
27. Serbia
28. South Africa
29. South Korea
30. South Sudan
31. Spain
32. Sudan
33. Switzerland
34. Thailand
35. Tunisia
36. Ukraine
37. Venezuela

=== Resident in Stockholm, Sweden ===
1. Albania
2. Algeria
3. Angola
4. Armenia
5. Botswana
6. Colombia
7. Congo-Brazzaville
8. Cuba
9. Ecuador
10. El Salvador
11. Holy See
12. Iraq
13. Kenya
14. Kosovo
15. Lebanon
16. Malaysia
17. Moldova
18. Mongolia
19. Mozambique
20. Namibia
21. New Zealand
22. North Korea
23. Rwanda
24. Saudi Arabia
25. Slovakia
26. Sri Lanka
27. Syria
28. Tanzania
29. Uruguay
30. Zambia

=== Resident elsewhere ===
1. Andorra (Andorra la Vella)
2. Bahamas (Washington, D.C.)
3. Barbados (Bridgetown)
4. Benin (Paris)
5. Djibouti (Paris)
6. Honduras (Brussels)
7. Liechtenstein (Vaduz)
8. Malta (Valletta)
9. Mauritania (Brussels)
10. San Marino (City of San Marino)

=== Unconfirmed ===
1. Ethiopia (Stockholm)
2. Ivory Coast (Copenhagen)
3. Libya (Stockholm)
4. Maldives (London)
5. Sierra Leone (London)

== See also ==
- List of diplomatic missions of Iceland
