= Richard Best (diplomat) =

British diplomat

Sir Richard Radford Best, KCVO, CBE (28 July 1933 – 7 March 2014) was a senior British diplomat. He served as Ambassador to Iceland from 1989 to 1991.

== Early life ==
Best was born in Worthing, West Sussex, on 28 July 1933. He studied history at University College London, graduating Bachelor of Arts (BA).

== Career ==
On 31 December 1970, Best was appointed an officer of Her Majesty's Diplomatic Service.

== Honours ==
In the 1977 Birthday Honours, Best was appointed Member of the Order of the British Empire (MBE) for his services as First Secretary, H.M. Embassy Stockholm. and a CBE in the 1989 New Year Honours for his service as Deputy High Commissioner in Nigeria. On 26 June 1990, he was appointed Knight Commander of the Royal Victorian Order (KCVO), therefore granted the title of Sir.

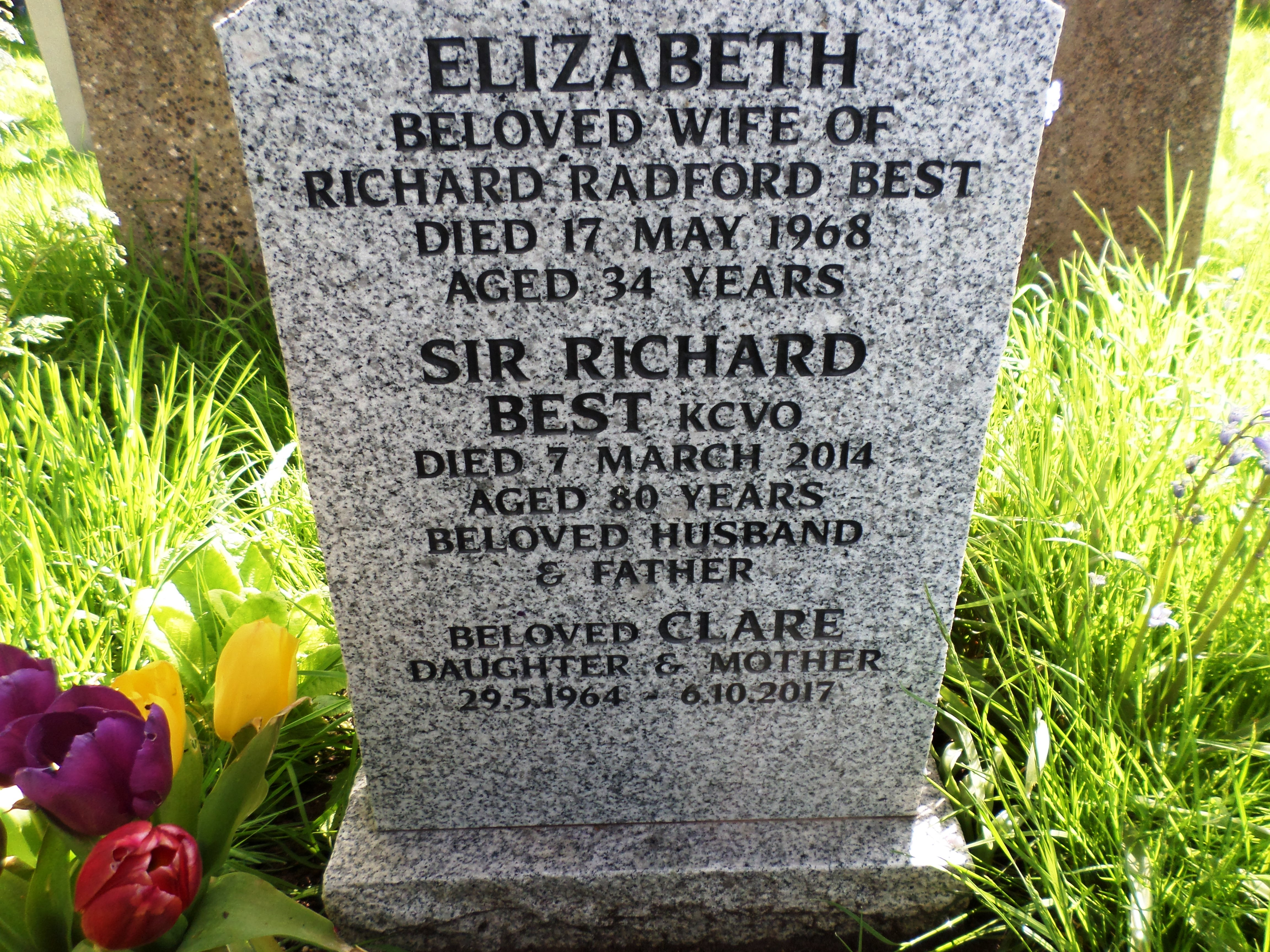
Grave of Sir Richard Radford Best, St Mary the Virgin, East Preston, West Sussex, England
