= Höfði =

Historic building in Iceland

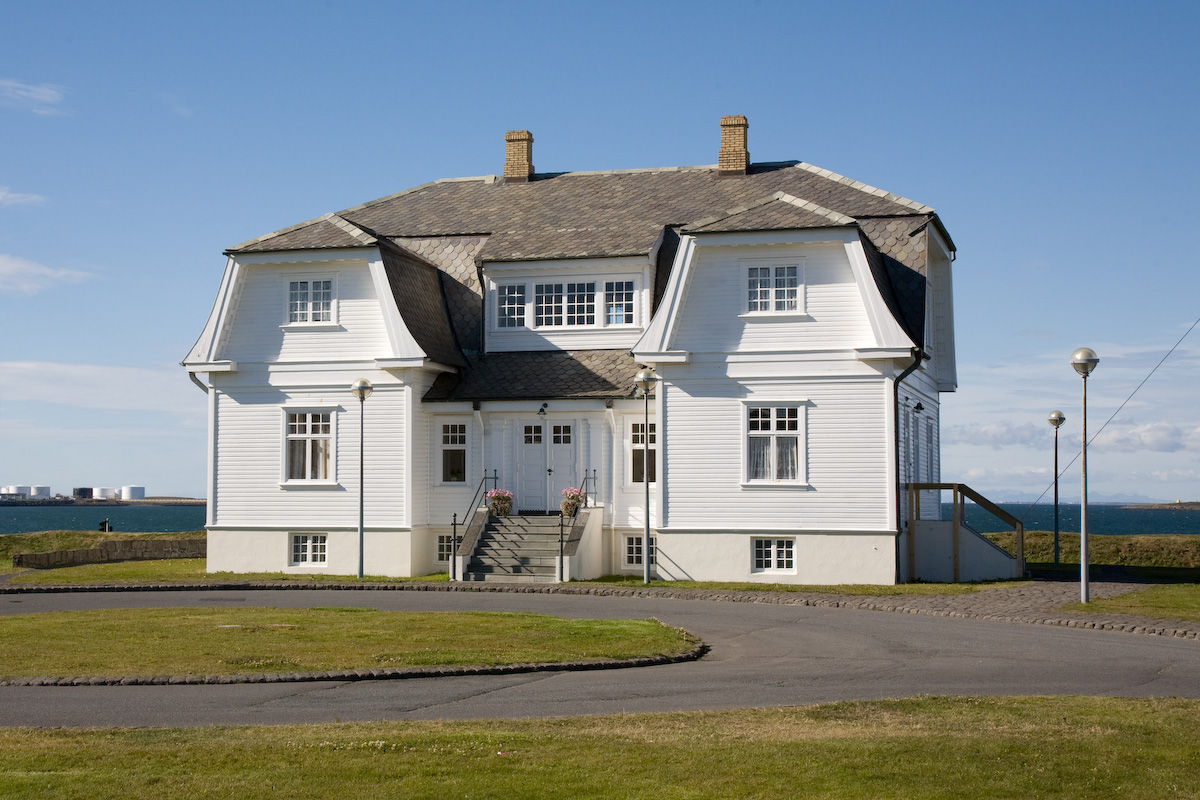
- Exterior façade in 2007
- Interactive map of the Höfði area

General information
- Architectural style: Jugendstil
- Location: Félagstún 1, Reykjavík, Iceland
- Coordinates: 64°08′47″N 21°54′24″W
- Opened: 1909
- Owner: City of Reykjavík

Höfði (Icelandic pronunciation: [ˈhœvðɪ]) is a house in Reykjavík, Iceland, built in 1909, and best known as the location for the 1986 Reykjavík Summit meeting of President Ronald Reagan of the United States and General Secretary Mikhail Gorbachev of the Soviet Union. Though technically a failure, the meeting was an important step towards ending of the Cold War. Within the building, the flags of the United States and the Soviet Union are cross-hung to commemorate the meeting.

== History ==
The house was built in 1909 and is located at Félagstún. It was initially built for the French consul in Iceland, Jean-Paul Brillouin, and was the exclusive residence of poet and businessman Einar Benediktsson (1864–1940) for twelve years (1913–1925). From 1925 to 1937 painter Louisa Matthíasdóttir grew up in the house since her family resided there.

In the 1940s and 1950s, it was home to the British Embassy in Reykjavík. The city of Reykjavík purchased the house in 1958, and restored it. From then on it has been used for formal receptions and festive occasions.

On 25 September 2009, on the building's 100th birthday, Höfði was damaged in a fire. All irreplaceable artifacts were saved.

In 2015, Einar Benediktsson's statue, by Ásmundur Sveinsson, was moved to a spot near Höfði house.

== Construction ==
The house, which shows the influence of Jugendstil, was prefabricated in Norway, shipped to Iceland and erected in 1909 for the French consul, before permission for the house had been granted by the city planning department. At the time of construction it was the largest private estate in the city.

== Telecommunications history ==
Before the house was built, the site was used to make the first radio communications between Iceland and the outside world on 26 June 1905, when contact was made with Poldhu in Cornwall, UK, with a Marconi antenna. The effort was instigated by poet Einar Benediktsson. The antenna was in use until October 1906.

== Local legend ==
The memoirs of one of the earliest occupants of Höfði state that the house is inhabited by the spirit of a young woman. Accounts vary on who she is but most commonly she is either a suicide or drowning victim. John Greenway, who inhabited the house in 1952, insisted that it be sold and the British consulate moved elsewhere, because of what he called "bumps in the night". He even applied for special permission from the Foreign Office to do so. That same year the house was sold back to the Icelandic government.

Popular local legends differ from the accounts of the house's inhabitants; the most popular of which is that the house is a Viking burial site. For this reason locals say the liquor cabinet of the house is frequently raided by spirits.

The legend has even gained recognition by the Foreign Ministry, who have officially stated that "We do not confirm or deny that the Höfði has a ghost."

== Gallery ==
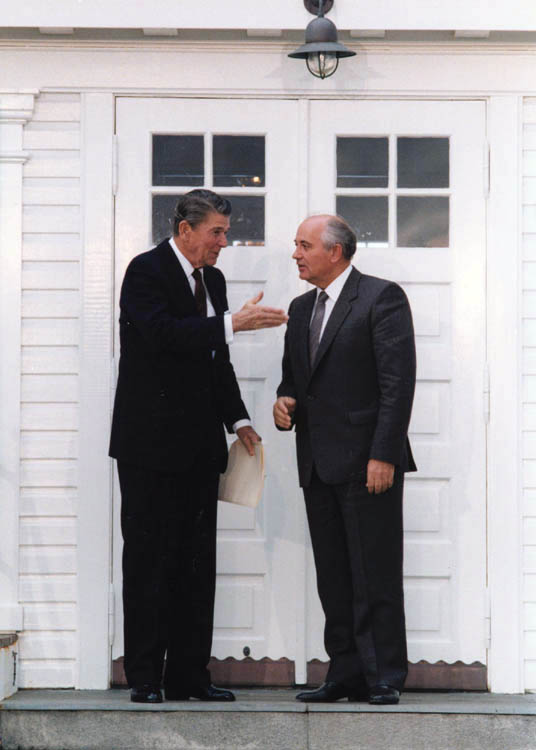
Ronald Reagan and Mikhail Gorbachev at Höfði

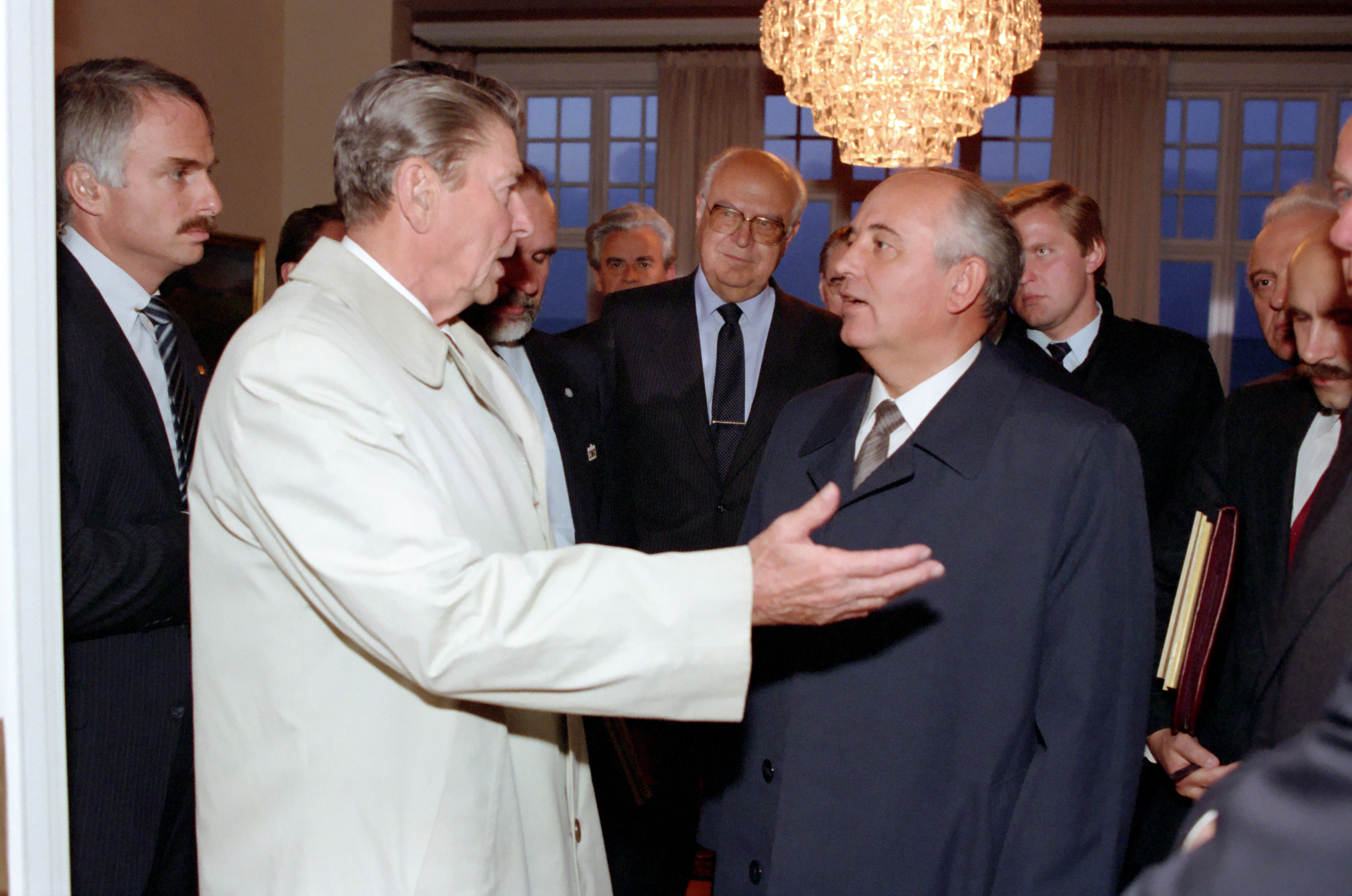
Reagan and Gorbachev greet each other at Höfði

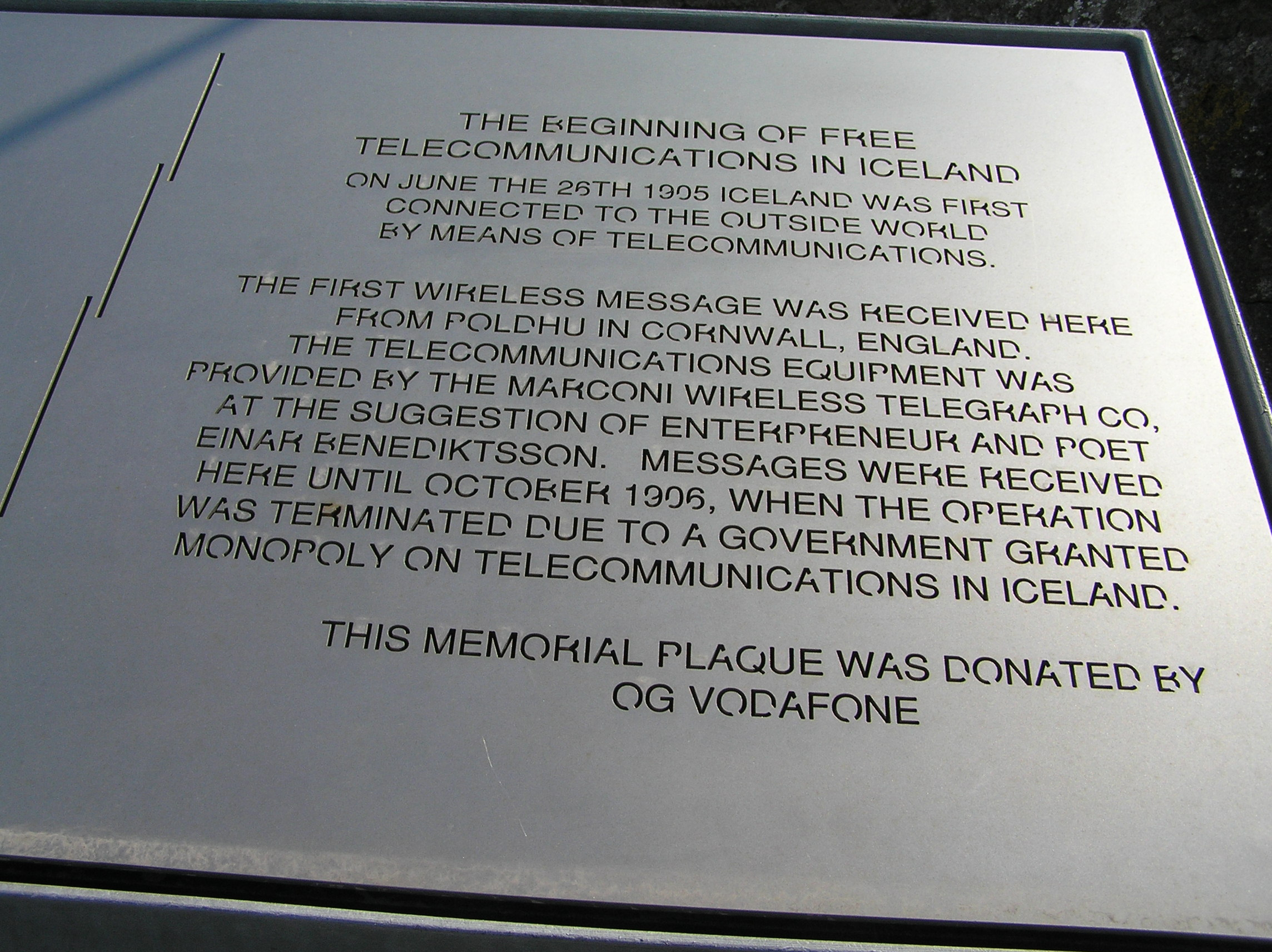
Telecomms commemoration plaque

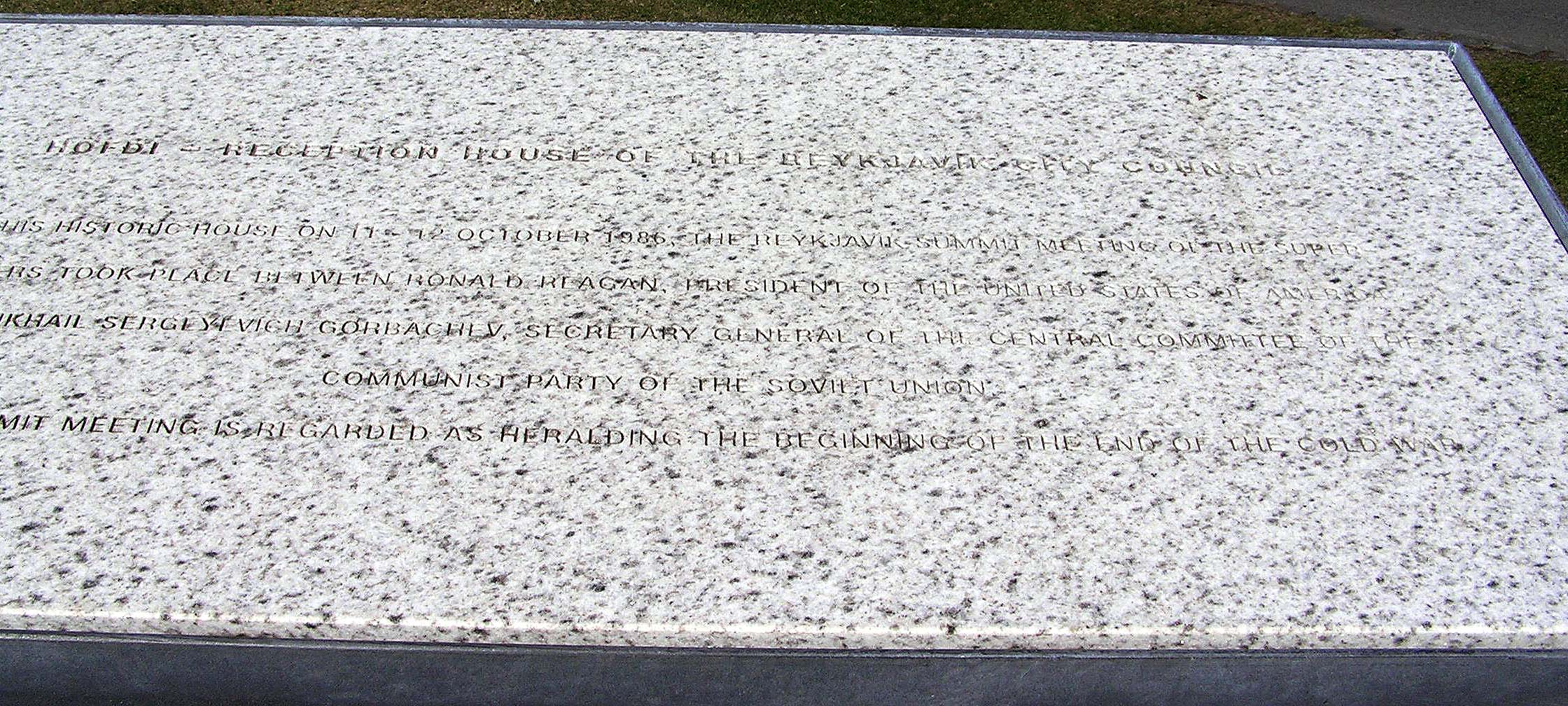
Reagan-Gorbachev plaque
