= Iceland–United Kingdom relations =

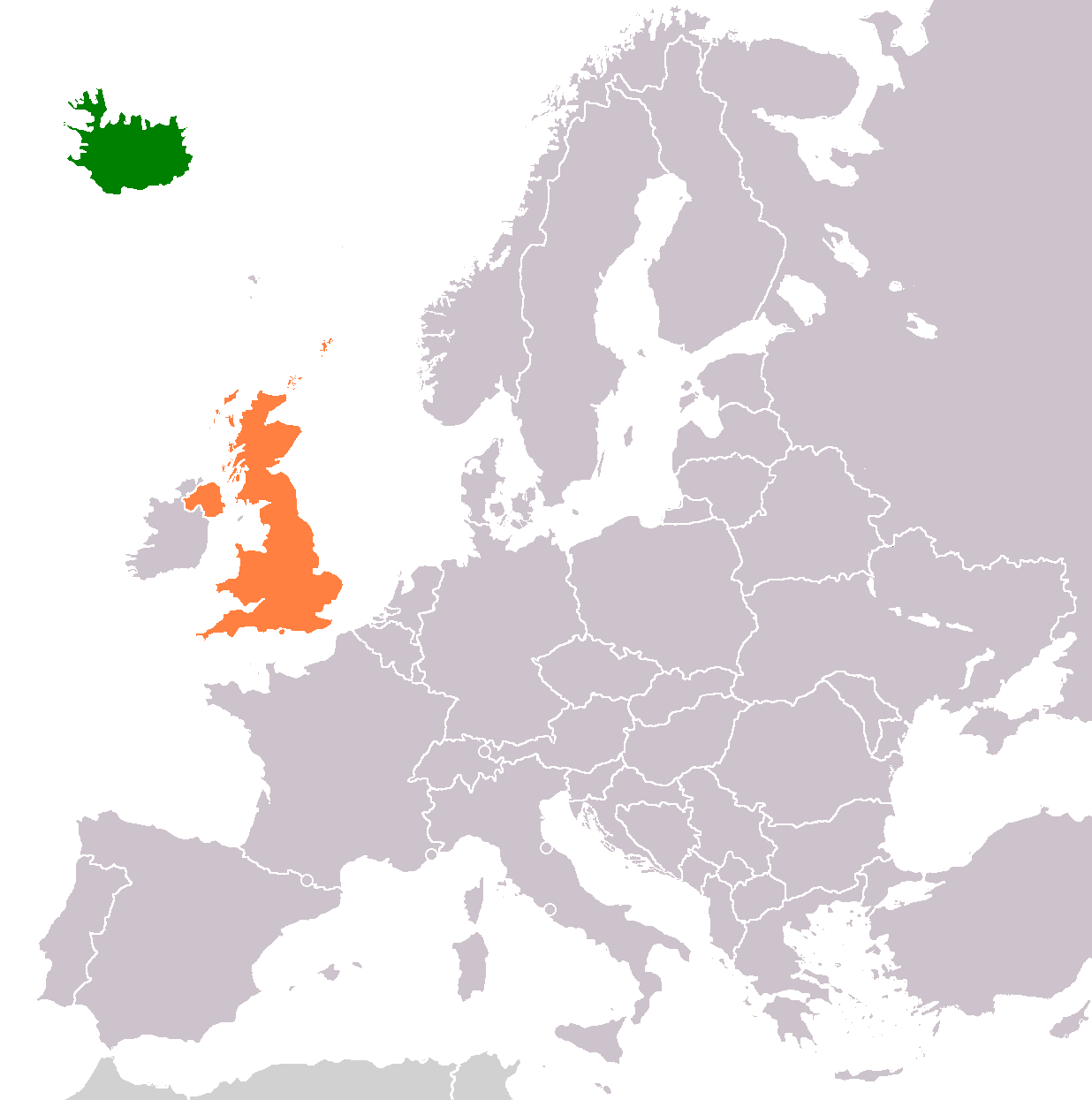

- Iceland: United Kingdom

Diplomatic mission
- Embassy of Iceland, London: Embassy of the United Kingdom, Reykjavík

Envoy
- Ambassador Sturla Sigurjónsson: Ambassador Bryony Mathew

Iceland–United Kingdom relations are foreign relations between Iceland and the United Kingdom.

Before independence, Iceland had been an independent part of the Kingdom of Denmark since 1918. Fearing an Axis move against Iceland following the Nazi occupation of Denmark, British forces landed on Iceland in 1940. On 17 June 1944, 200 days after the 25-year Danish–Icelandic Act of Union had expired and following a referendum, Iceland was declared an independent republic with this being recognised by London as well as the King of Denmark.

From Iceland's independence until the mid-1970s, bilateral relations were difficult due to the 'Cod Wars' (a series of disputes over fishing rights in the 1950s and 1970s). Since then relations have improved, mainly because both countries have common interests including free trade, defence, environmental protection and international peace. Both countries are members of NATO and Joint Expeditionary Force.

Queen Elizabeth II of the United Kingdom paid a state visit to Iceland in June 1990. In October 2015, David Cameron became the first Prime Minister of the United Kingdom to officially visit Iceland (to attend the Northern Future Forum) since it became a republic in 1944. The last United Kingdom Prime Minister to visit the territory had been Winston Churchill, in August 1941.

The United Kingdom has an embassy in Reykjavík. Iceland has an embassy in London and seventeen honorary consulates in: Aberdeen, Birmingham, Cardiff, Dover, East Riding of Yorkshire, Edinburgh, Fleetwood, Glasgow, Grimsby, Guernsey, Jersey (in the Channel Islands), Lerwick, Liverpool, Manchester, Newcastle-upon-Tyne, Northern Ireland, and York.

== Disputes past and present ==
=== Second World War ===
During the Second World War in 1940 following the fall of Denmark the United Kingdom launched the Invasion of Iceland and occupied Icelandic territory until 1941 when defence responsibility was transferred to the United States of America.

=== Cod Wars ===
The Cod Wars were a series of confrontations in the 1950s and 1970s between the United Kingdom and Iceland regarding fishing rights in the North Atlantic. In February 1976 Iceland severed diplomatic ties with Britain, an unprecedented action between two NATO members, which were restored in the spring of that year.

=== Rockall ===
Rockall was claimed by a number of nations, including Iceland and the United Kingdom, as well as by the Republic of Ireland and Denmark (on behalf of the Faroe Islands). The United Kingdom and Ireland reached a power sharing agreement over Rockall, but as yet no other agreements exist with Iceland or Denmark.

=== Icesave dispute ===
The Icesave dispute was a dispute between Iceland and the United Kingdom, Germany and the Netherlands over frozen assets held by collapsed Icelandic banks which operated in the above countries, causing much political tension.

=== Mackerel row ===
During the 2000s, mackerel migration and spawning took place in both Faroese and Icelandic waters and since then the quota Iceland has allocated to itself has risen to a 130,000-ton quota. This has led to tensions between the Icelandic government and those of the United Kingdom, Norway and Ireland. The European Union and Norway awarded themselves 90% of the TAC in 2011, despite Icelandic and Faroese objections. Scientific investigations concluded that the TAC of mackerel should be 646,000 tons, of which the EU and Norway awarded themselves 583,882 tons, leaving only 62,118 tons for the Faroe Islands and Iceland. This debate has led to speculation of a future cod war.

== Diplomatic missions ==
The Embassy of Iceland in London is located on Hans Street in Kensington. The British Embassy in Reykjavík is located on Laufásvegur street in the Miðborg district.

== See also ==
- Foreign relations of Iceland
- Foreign relations of the United Kingdom
- Iceland–EU relations
- UK–EU relations
- Icelanders in the United Kingdom
- Britons in Iceland
