= Embassy of Germany, Reykjavík =

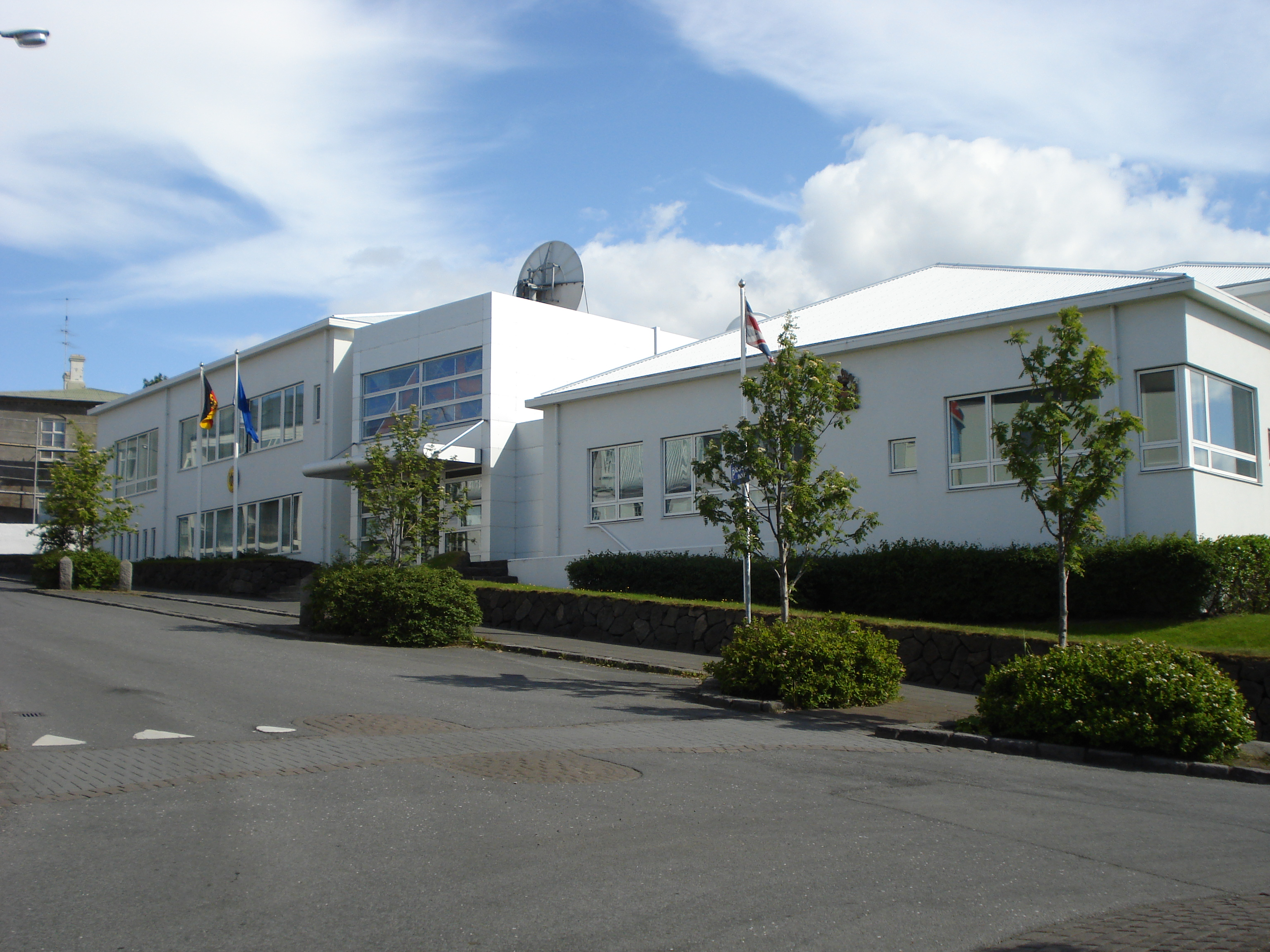
German Embassy, Reykjavík
- Location: Reykjavík, Iceland
- Address: Laufásvegur 31, 101 Reykjavík, Iceland
- Coordinates: 64.1428°N 21.9372°W
- Ambassador: Dietrich Becker
- Website: German Embassy, Reykjavík

The Embassy of Germany in Reykjavík is the diplomatic mission of Germany in Iceland. The embassy is located on Laufásvegur street in the Miðborg district of the city. Since the 1990s, the building has been shared with the British Embassy. The current German Ambassador to Iceland is Dietrich Becker.

== History ==
Coat of Arms of German Foreign Missions

In 1968, the British Government bought Laufásvegur 31 and the old farmhouse which was there was donated to the Reykjavik Museum and moved to the heritage site at Árbæjarsafn.

When the embassy was redeveloped in the 1990s, it was decided that the location was too large for Britain's needs and so it looked for another partner to share it with. At the same time the German government was also looking for a new location and so agreed to share building and facilities at Laufásvegur 31. It is thought to be the first time a building was constructed to house two embassies. It was opened on 2 June 1996, in the presence of Malcolm Rifkind, Werner Hoyer, and Halldór Ásgrímsson. A plaque inside reads "the first purpose built co-located British-German chancery building in Europe".

== See also ==
- Iceland–Germany relations
- List of diplomatic missions in Iceland
