= Shoe-banging incident =

1960 act by Nikita Khrushchev in the UN

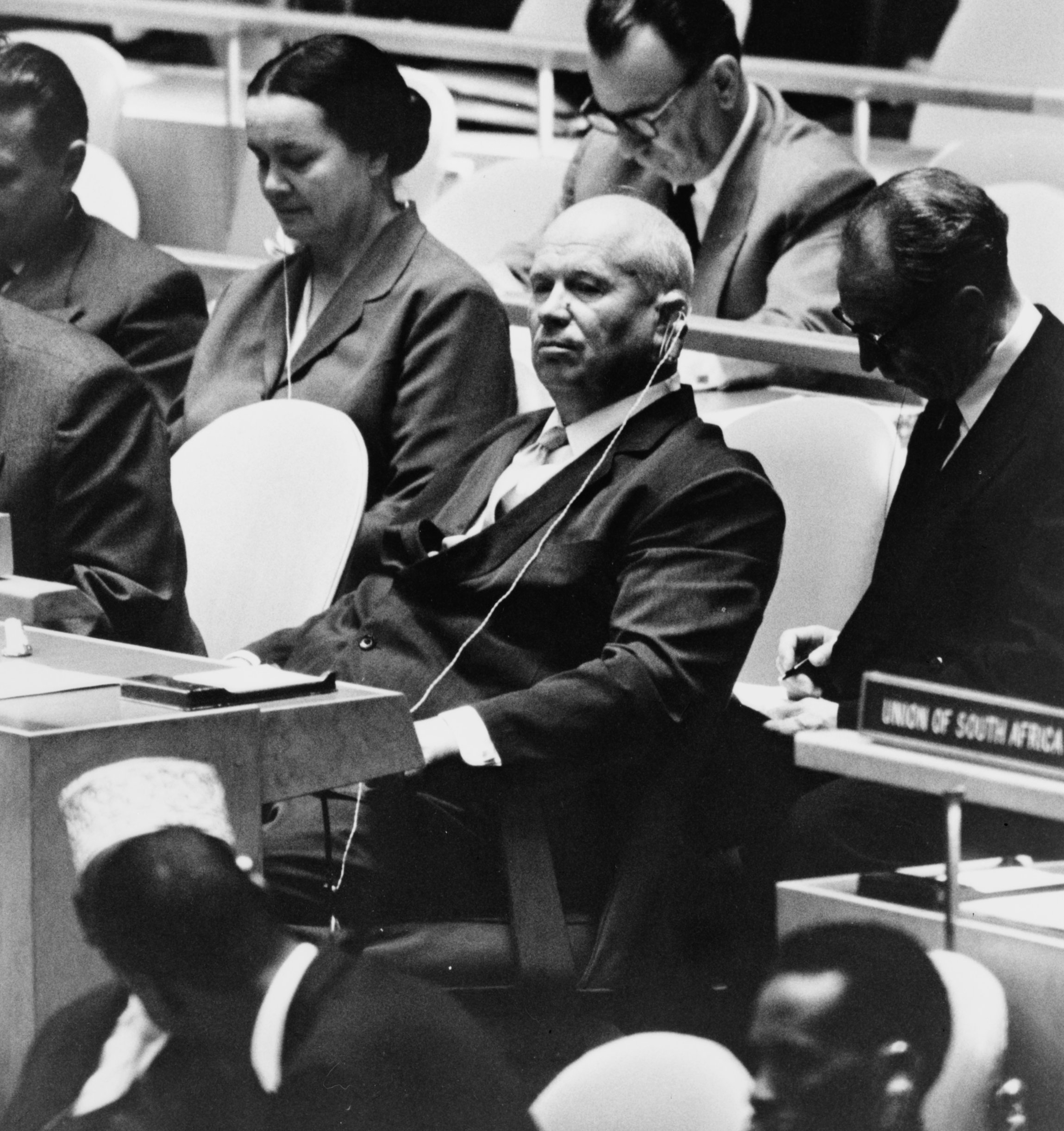
Khrushchev at a meeting of the UN General Assembly on 22 September, three weeks before the incident

During the 902nd Plenary Meeting of the United Nations General Assembly held in New York City on 12 October 1960, Nikita Khrushchev, First Secretary of the Communist Party of the Soviet Union, was alleged to have pounded his shoe on his delegate-desk in protest at a speech by Philippine delegate Lorenzo Sumulong.

In 2003, American scholar William Taubman, in his biography of Khrushchev, reported that after interviewing eyewitnesses, despite the conflicting accounts and with full historiographical humility, he had adopted the view that the shoe was not only brandished but banged.

== Description ==
The often used fake image of Khrushchev waving a shoe (above), and the original photo taken at the United Nations General Assembly, 10 October 1960, AP archives (below)

On 12 October 1960, head of the Filipino delegation Lorenzo Sumulong referred to "the peoples of Eastern Europe and elsewhere which have been deprived of the free exercise of their civil and political rights and which have been swallowed up, so to speak, by the Soviet Union". Upon hearing this, Khrushchev quickly came to the rostrum, being recognized on a point of order. There he demonstratively, in a theatrical manner, brushed Sumulong aside, with an upward motion of his right arm—without physically touching him—and began a lengthy denunciation of Sumulong, branding him (among other things) as "a jerk, a stooge, and a lackey", and a "toady of American imperialism" and demanded Assembly President Frederick Boland (Ireland) call Sumulong to order. Boland did caution Sumulong to "avoid wandering out into an argument which is certain to provoke further interventions", but permitted him to continue speaking and sent Khrushchev back to his seat.

According to some sources, Khrushchev pounded his fists on his desk in protest as Sumulong continued to speak, and at one point picked up his shoe and banged the desk with it. Some other sources report a different order of events: Khrushchev first banged the shoe then went to the rostrum to protest. Sumulong's speech was again interrupted. Another point of order was raised by the highly agitated Romanian Foreign Vice-minister Eduard Mezincescu, a member of the Eastern Bloc. Mezincescu gave his own angry denunciation of Sumulong and then turned his anger on Boland, his provoking, insulting, and ignoring of the Assembly President leading to his microphone being eventually shut off. This prompted a chorus of shouts and jeers from the Eastern Bloc delegations. The chaotic scene finally ended when Boland abruptly declared the meeting adjourned and slammed his gavel, named Thor's gavel, down so hard he broke it, sending the head flying.

This incident was reported at the time by a number of newspapers, including The New York Times, The Washington Post, The Guardian, The Times, and Le Monde. The New York Times had a photograph that pictured Khrushchev and Andrei Gromyko, with a shoe on Khrushchev's desk.

This incident should not be confused with an earlier one at the General Assembly, on 29 September, when Khrushchev angrily interrupted Harold Macmillan, Prime Minister of the United Kingdom, banging the desk and shouting in Russian, at which Macmillan drily said "I should like that to be translated, if I may".

The incident is featured in the 2024 documentary Soundtrack to a Coup d'Etat by Belgian filmmaker Johan Grimonprez.

According to the filmmaker in an interview: "I had always known about the shoe incident and found it amusing, but I never realized it was connected to Belgium and Congo. Only later did I discover that Khrushchev banged his shoe on the table to protest the coup against Lumumba and denounce the hypocrisy of Western nations. He mentioned this in his audio memoirs, which I obtained from his son Sergei. These recordings, which had never been released as historical sources, shed light on the event since no footage exists."

In the film, a scene shows jazz musician Dizzy Gillespie description of the shoe-banging incident.

== Subsequent commentary ==
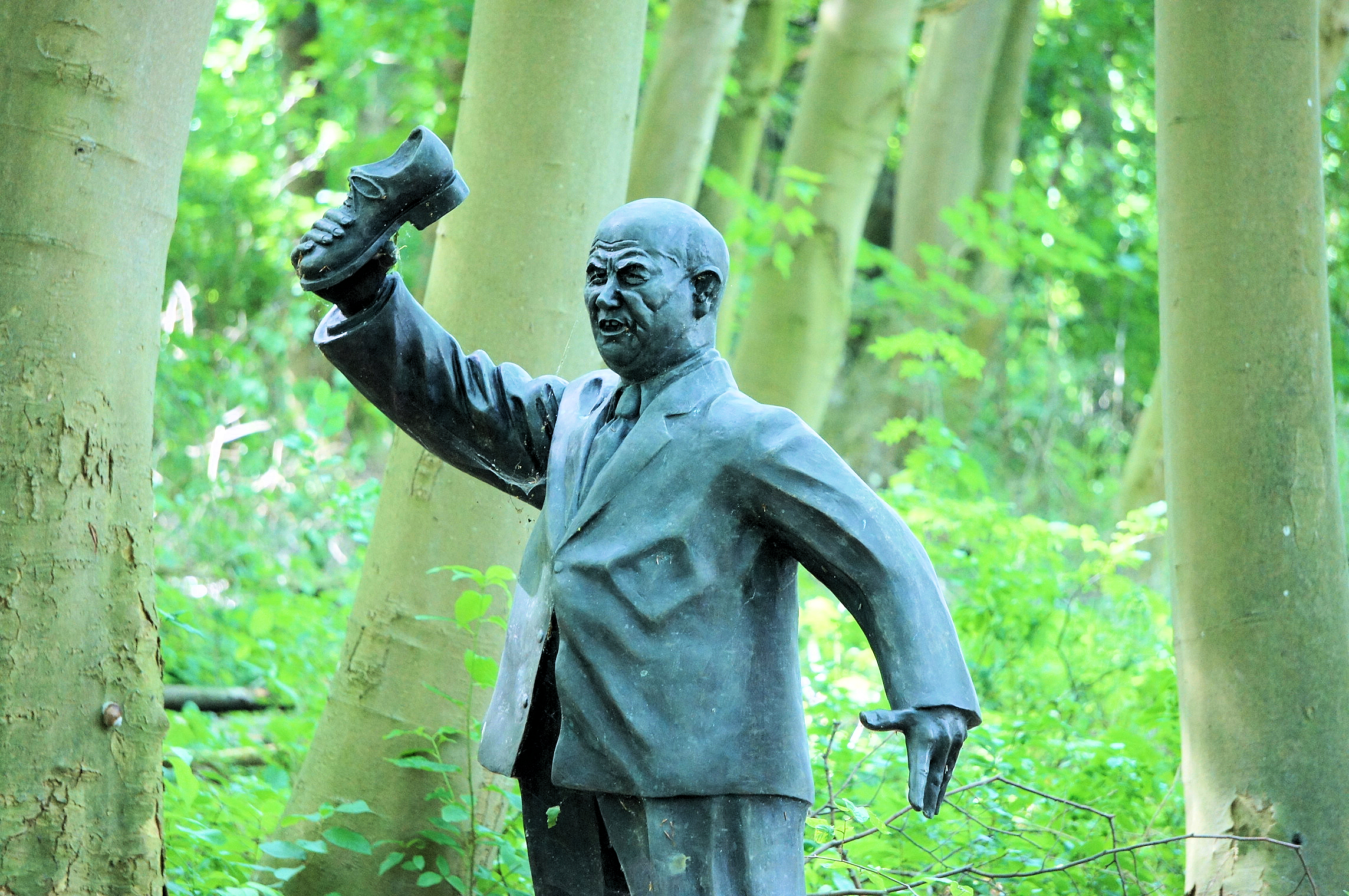
Sculpture of the incident in Mecklenburg-Vorpommern, Germany

Khrushchev was reported to be delighted with his performance, but other members of Eastern Bloc delegations to the UN were embarrassed or displeased. Khrushchev was removed as leader in 1964, and he was criticized for the incident: "a shameful episode that he still presents as an act of valor".

In 1961, Marxist philosopher Frantz Fanon commented: "And when Mr. Khrushchev brandishes his shoe at the United Nations and hammers the table with it, no colonized individual, no representative of the underdeveloped countries laughs. For what Mr. Khrushchev is showing the colonized countries who are watching is that he, the missile-wielding muzhik, is treating these wretched capitalists the way they deserve."

Khrushchev mentioned the shoe-banging in his memoirs, writing that he was speaking strongly against the Franco regime in Spain. A representative of Spain took the floor to reply and, after his speech, the delegates from Socialist countries made a lot of noise in protest. Khrushchev wrote: "Remembering reports I have read about the sessions of the State Duma in Russia, I decided to add a little more heat. I took off my shoe and pounded it on desk so that our protest would be louder." The footnote to this text says that Khrushchev's recollections are mistaken. The Times, on 3 October 1960, had reported that Khrushchev launched an "angry tirade" against Franco on 1 October, and the article made no mention of shoe-banging.

Khrushchev's great-granddaughter Nina L. Khrushcheva writes that, after years of embarrassed silence, her family explained their recollection of the event. According to Nina, Khrushchev was wearing new and tight shoes, so he took them off while sitting. He started pounding the table with his fist during his angry response, and his watch fell off. When he was picking it up, his empty shoes caught his eye and he took the opportunity to pick one up and pound the desk with it. She also mentions that many versions of the incident have been in circulation, with various dates and occasions.

Nina's account is very similar to that of Khrushchev's long-time interpreter Viktor Sukhodrev, who sat with him during the event and reported that his boss pounded on his delegate-desk so hard that his watch stopped, which only infuriated him further and prompted the switch to the shoe.

Sergei Khrushchev (Nikita's son) stated that he could not find any photo or video evidence of the incident. Both NBC and CBC ran a search in their archives but were unable to find a tape of the event.

In Sergei's opinion, it would be very unlikely that Nikita Khrushchev intentionally removed his shoe. There was little space under the desk, and the Soviet leader, being somewhat overweight, could not reach his feet. This specific issue was addressed in 2002 by a former UN staffer, who said that Khrushchev could not have spontaneously removed his shoe at his desk but had previously lost it after a journalist stepped on it. The UN staffer then retrieved the shoe, wrapped it in a napkin, and passed it back to Khrushchev, who was unable to put it back on and had to leave it on the floor next to his desk; the same staffer also confirmed that she saw him later bang the shoe on the desk, thus lending credence to the reports by Nina Khrushcheva and Viktor Sukhodrev.

According to German journalist Walter Henkels, a shoe producer in Pirmasens said he had seen a picture of the shoe in a newspaper and recognized it as being from his company. The Federal Ministry of Economics explained that West Germany had sent 30,000 pairs of shoes to the Soviet Union. Among them were 2,000 pairs of good low shoes, and one of them might have found its way to Khrushchev.

== See also ==
- "We will bury you"
- Kuzma's mother
- Bush shoeing incident
