= Détente =

Relaxation of strained international relations by verbal communication

- 1969–1979
Containment / Brinkmanship (e.g., Cuban Missile Crisis)	Second Cold War / Reagan Doctrine
- Location: Global (primarily United States, Soviet Union, and China)
- Leaders: Leonid Brezhnev; Henry Kissinger; Willy Brandt (Ostpolitik); Mao Zedong
- Presidents: Richard Nixon; Gerald Ford; Jimmy Carter
- Key events: 1972 Nixon visit to China; SALT I (1972) and ABM Treaty; Helsinki Accords (1975); Apollo–Soyuz test project (1975); SALT II (1979)

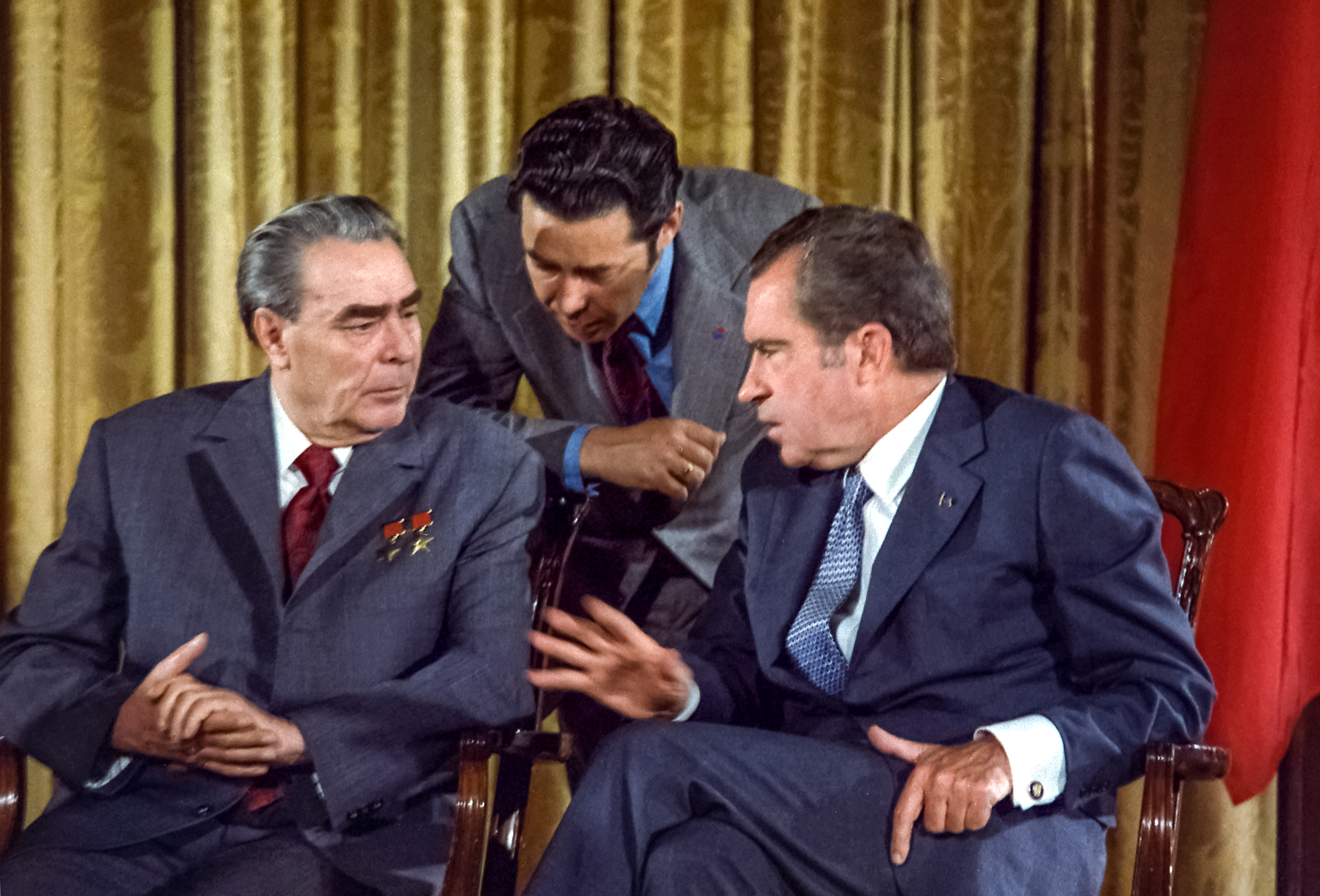
Leonid Brezhnev (left), Viktor Sukhodrev (center), and Richard Nixon (right) during Brezhnev's 1973 visit to Washington, D.C., a high-water mark in détente between the United States and the Soviet Union

Détente (/deɪˈtɑːnt/ day-TAHNT, also UK: /ˈdeɪtɒnt/ DAY-tont; French for 'relaxation', French pronunciation: [detɑ̃t]) is the relaxation of strained relations, especially political ones, through verbal communication. The diplomacy term originates from around 1912, when France and Germany tried unsuccessfully to reduce tensions.

The term is often used to refer to a period of general easing of geopolitical tensions between the Soviet Union and the United States during the Cold War. Détente began in 1969 as a core element of the foreign policy of U.S. president Richard Nixon. In an effort to avoid an escalation of conflict with the Eastern Bloc, the Nixon administration promoted greater dialogue with the Soviet government in order to facilitate negotiations over arms control and other bilateral agreements. Détente was known in Russian as разрядка (razryadka), loosely meaning "relaxation of tension". Détente unravelled steadily throughout the late 1970s due to proxy conflicts in Africa and disagreement over human rights, but its definitive end came with the Soviet Invasion of Afghanistan (December 1979).

== History ==
=== Cold War ===
The "Three Worlds" of the Cold War era in 1975: First World: Western Bloc led by the United States and its allies Second World: Eastern Bloc led by the Soviet Union, China (Independent), and their allies Third World: Non-Aligned and neutral countries

While the recognized era of détente formally began under the Richard Nixon presidency, there were prior instances of relationship relaxation between the United States and Soviet Union during the Cold War. Following the Cuban Missile Crisis in 1962, both the United States and Soviet Union agreed to install a direct hotline between Washington and Moscow, colloquially known as the red telephone. The hotline enabled leaders of both countries to communicate rapidly in the event of another potentially catastrophic confrontation.

The period of détente in the Cold War saw the ratification of major disarmament treaties such as the Anti-Ballistic Missile Treaty and the creation of more symbolic pacts such as the Helsinki Accords. An ongoing debate among historians exists as to how successful the détente period was in achieving peace.

Détente is considered to have ended after the Soviet intervention in Afghanistan in 1979, which led to the U.S.' boycott of the 1980 Moscow Olympics. Ronald Reagan's election as president in 1980, based in part on an anti-détente campaign, induced a period of rising tension. In his first press conference, Reagan claimed that the U.S.'s pursuit of détente had been used by the Soviet Union to further its interests.

Relations continued to increasingly sour through the unrest in Poland, the U.S.'s withdrawal from the SALT II arms treaty, and the NATO Able Archer exercise.

In response to the heightening tensions, U.S. secretary of state George P. Shultz shifted the Ronald Reagan administration's foreign policy towards another period of de-escalation with the Soviet Union especially following Mikhail Gorbachev coming to power. During Gorbachev's leadership, dialogue over the START arms reduction treaty meaningfully progressed. Diplomatic overtures were continued by the succeeding Bush administration, including the ratification of the START treaty, up until the collapse of the Soviet Union in 1991. This period of a renewed de-escalation from 1984 to 1991 is sometimes referred to as the second period of détente.

According to Eric Grynaviski, "Soviet and U.S. decision-makers had two very different understandings about what détente meant" while simultaneously holding "an inaccurate belief that both sides shared principles and expectations for future behaviour."

==== Summits and treaties ====
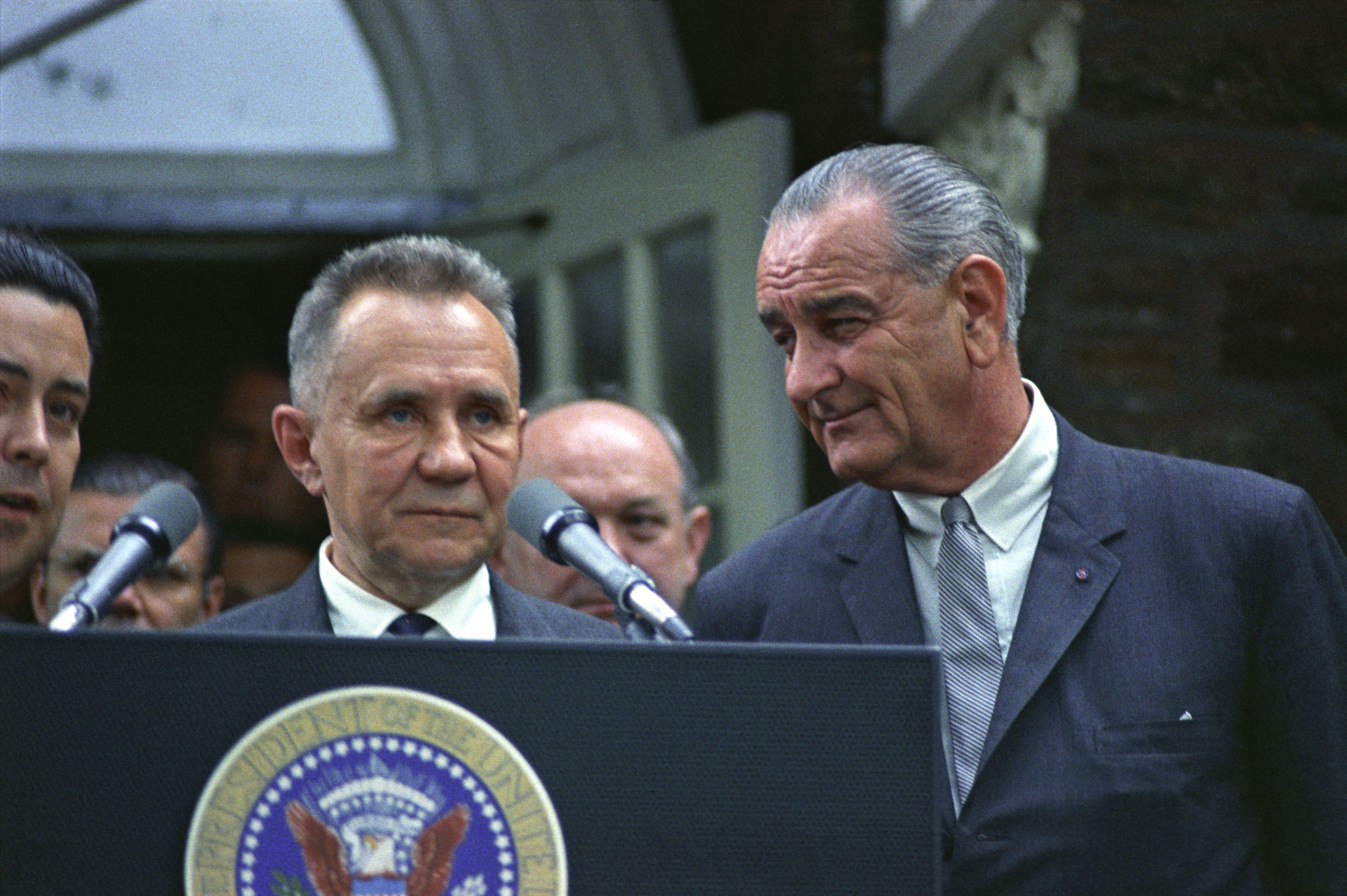
Alexei Kosygin and Lyndon B. Johnson at the Glassboro Summit Conference in 1967

Before Richard Nixon became president, the foundations of détente were developed through multilateral arms-limitation treaties in the early to middle 1960s. These included the August 1963 Partial Nuclear Test Ban Treaty, the January 1967 Outer Space Treaty, and the July 1968 Treaty on the Non-Proliferation of Nuclear Weapons. Historical developments such as the Cuban Missile Crisis and technological advancements such as the development of the intercontinental ballistic missile (ICBM) spurred these agreements.

When Nixon came into office in 1969, several important détente treaties were developed. Multiple Polish conferences on "security and cooperation in Europe" were held. In 1972, the Biological Weapons Convention and the Anti-Ballistic Missile Treaty were concluded, and talks on SALT II began the same year. The Washington Summit of 1973 further advanced mutual and international relations through discussion of diplomatic cooperation and continued discussion regarding limitations on nuclear weaponry.

In 1975, the Conference on Security and Cooperation in Europe (CSCE) met and produced the Helsinki Accords, a wide-ranging series of agreements on economic, political, and human rights issues. The CSCE was initiated by the Soviet Union and involved 35 states throughout Europe. One of the most prevalent issues after the conference was the question of human rights violations in the Soviet Union. The Soviet Constitution directly violated the Declaration of Human Rights of the United Nations, and that issue became a prominent point of separation between the United States and the Soviet Union.

The Jimmy Carter administration had been supporting human rights groups inside the Soviet Union, and Leonid Brezhnev accused the US of interference in other countries' internal affairs. That prompted intense discussion of whether or not other nations may interfere if basic human rights, such as freedom of speech and religion, are violated. This basic disagreement between the superpowers, a democracy, and a one-party state, did not allow that issue to be reconciled. Furthermore, the Soviets proceeded to defend their internal policies on human rights by attacking American support of South Africa, Chile, and other countries that were known to violate many of the same human rights.

In July 1975, the Apollo–Soyuz Test Project (ASTP) became the first international space mission; three American astronauts and two Soviet cosmonauts docked their spacecraft and conducted joint experiments. The mission had been preceded by five years of political negotiation and technical co-operation, including exchanges of American and Soviet engineers between both countries' space centres.

Trade relations between both blocs increased substantially during the era of détente. Most significant were the vast shipments of grain that were sent from the West to the Soviet Union each year and helped to make up for the failure of the kolkhoz, the Soviet collective farms.

At the same time, the Jackson–Vanik amendment, signed into law by U.S. president Gerald Ford on 3 January 1975 after a unanimous vote by both houses of the U.S. Congress, was designed to leverage trade relations between the Americans and the Soviets. It linked U.S. trade to improvements in human rights in the Soviet Union, particularly by allowing refuseniks to emigrate. It also added to the most favoured nation status a clause that no country that resisted emigration could be awarded that status, which provided a method to link geopolitics to human rights.

==== End of Vietnam War ====
Nixon and his national security advisor, Henry Kissinger, moved toward détente with the Soviet Union in the early 1970s. They hoped, in return, for Soviets to help the U.S. extricate or remove itself from Vietnam. People then started to notice the consciousness with which US politicians started to act.

==== Strategic Arms Limitations Talks ====
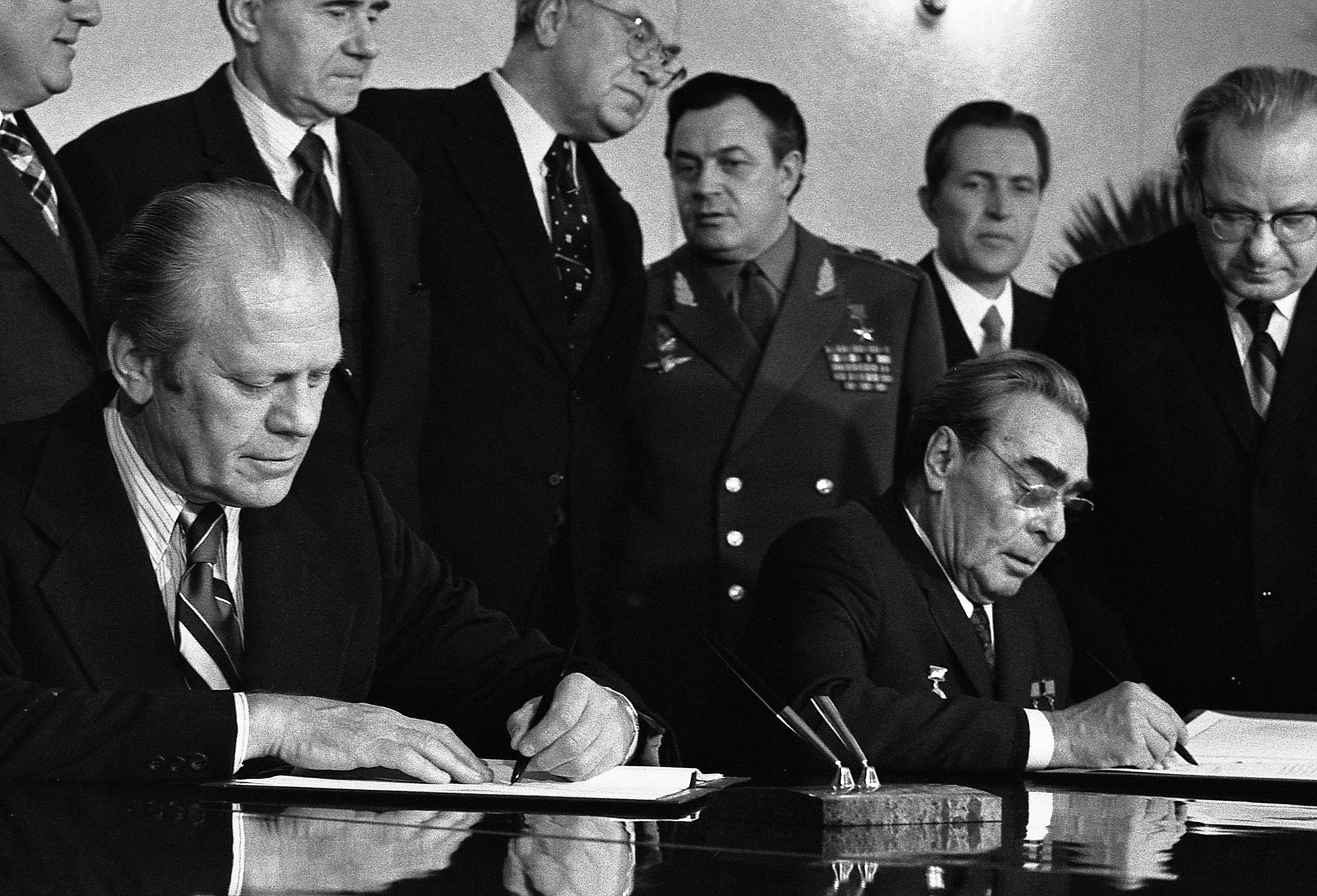
Gerald Ford and Leonid Brezhnev signing a joint communiqué on the SALT I treaty during the Vladivostok Summit in 1974

Nixon and Brezhnev signed an ABM treaty in Moscow on 26 May 1972 as well as SALT I, the Interim Agreement, which temporarily capped the number of strategic arms (MIRVs, SLBMs, and ICBMs). That was a show of détente militarily since an expansion of nuclear ballistic arms had started to occur.

The goal of Nixon and Kissinger was to use arms control to promote a much broader policy of détente, which could then allow the resolution of other urgent problems through what Nixon called "linkage." David Tal argued:

The linkage between strategic arms limitations and outstanding issues such as the Middle East, Berlin and, foremost, Vietnam thus became central to Nixon's and Kissinger's policy of détente. Through employment of linkage, they hoped to change the nature and course of U.S. foreign policy, including U.S. nuclear disarmament and arms control policy, and to separate them from those practiced by Nixon's predecessors. They also intended, through linkage, to make U.S. arms control policy part of détente. ... His policy of linkage had in fact failed. It failed mainly because it was based on flawed assumptions and false premises, the foremost of which was that the Soviet Union wanted strategic arms limitation agreement much more than the United States did.

==== Apollo–Soyuz handshake ====
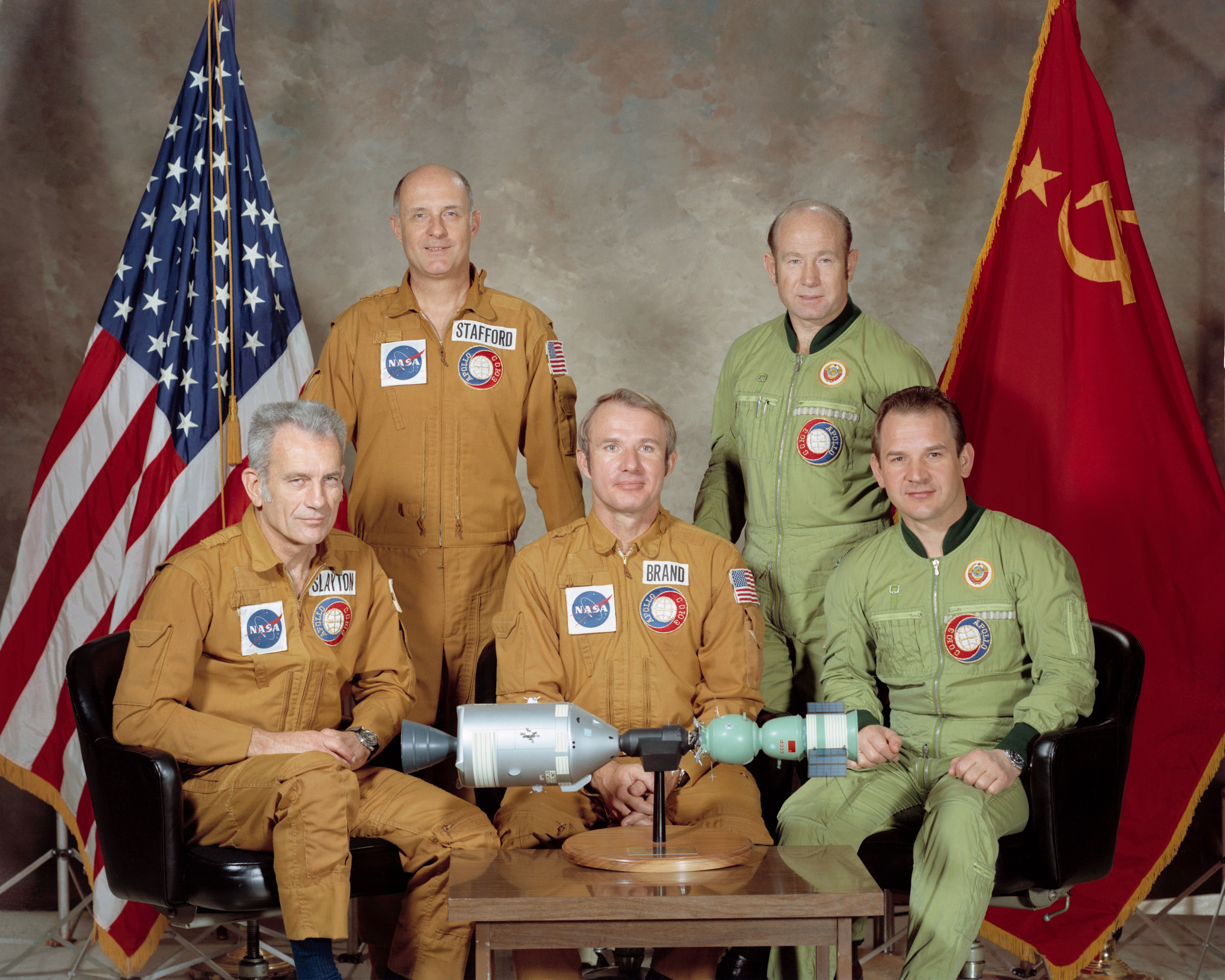
The Apollo–Soyuz crew in 1975

A significant example of an event contributing to détente was the handshake that took place in space. In July 1975, the first Soviet-American joint space flight was conducted, the ASTP. Its primary goal was the creation of an international docking system, which would allow two different spacecraft to join in orbit. That would allow both crews on board to collaborate on space exploration. The project marked the end of the Space Race, which had started in 1957 with the launch of Sputnik 1, and allowed tensions between the Americans and the Soviets to decrease significantly.

==== Concurrent conflicts ====
As direct relations thawed, increased tensions continued between both superpowers through their proxies, especially in the Third World. Conflicts in South Asia and the Middle East in 1973 saw the Soviet Union and the U.S. backing their respective surrogates, such as in Afghanistan, with war material and diplomatic posturing. In Latin America, the U.S. continued to block any left-wing electoral shifts in the region by supporting unpopular right-wing military coups and military dictatorships. Meanwhile, there were also many communist or left-wing guerrillas around the region, which were militarily and economically backed by the Soviet Union, China and Cuba.

During much of the early détente period, the Vietnam War continued to rage. Both sides still mistrusted each other, and the potential for nuclear war remained constant, notably during the 1973 Yom Kippur War when the U.S. raised its alert level to DEFCON 3, the highest since the Cuban Missile Crisis.

Both sides continued aiming thousands of nuclear warheads atop intercontinental ballistic missiles (ICBMs) at each other's cities, maintaining submarines with long-range nuclear weapon capability (submarine-launched ballistic missiles, or SLBMs) in the world's oceans, keeping hundreds of nuclear-armed aircraft on constant alert, and guarding contentious borders in Korea and Europe with large ground forces. Espionage efforts remained a high priority, and defectors, reconnaissance satellites, and signal intercepts measured each other's intentions to try to gain a strategic advantage.

==== Reignited tensions and the end of the détente ====
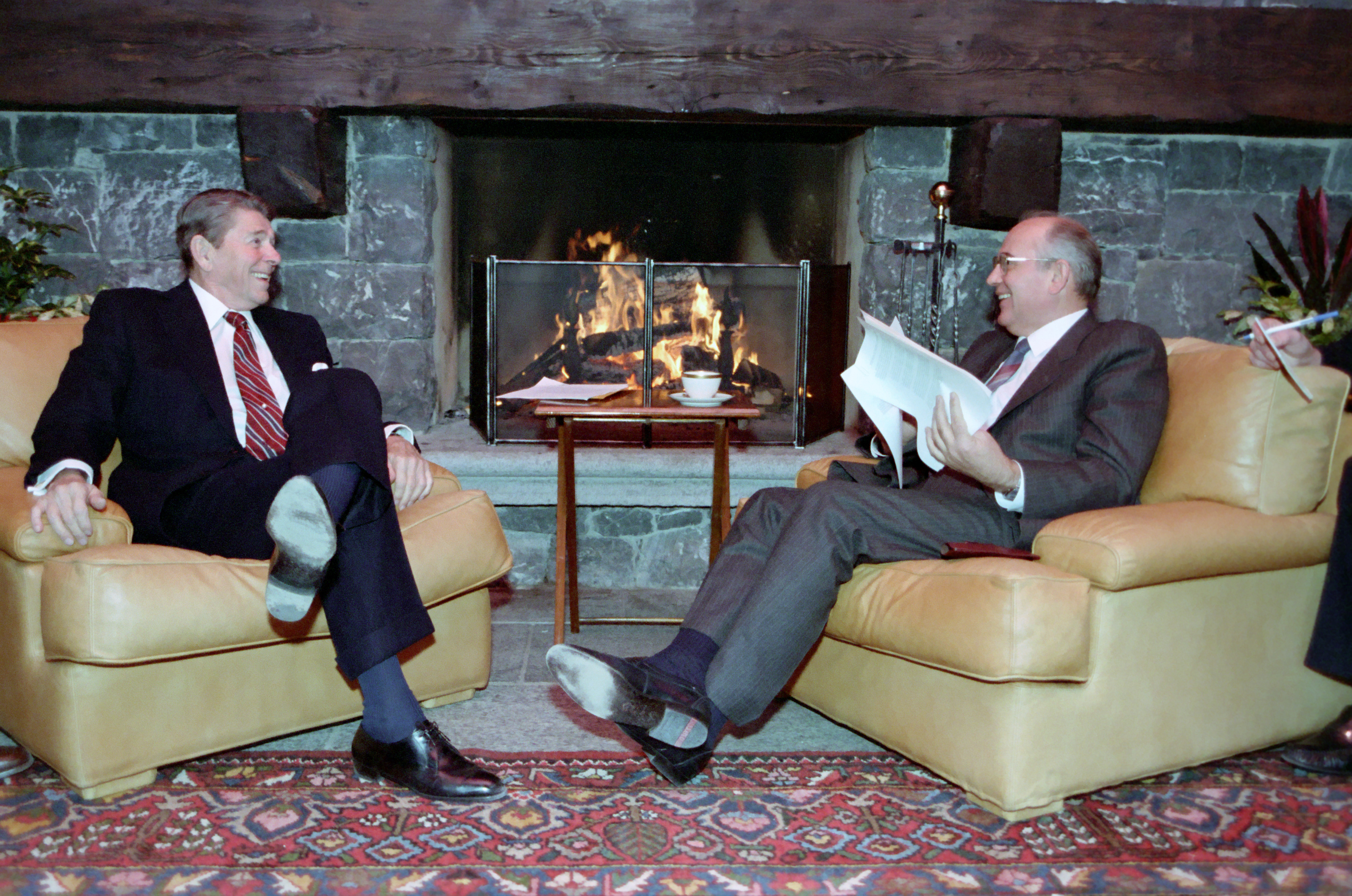
Ronald Reagan and Mikhail Gorbachev in 1985

The 1979 Soviet invasion of Afghanistan, carried out in an attempt to shore up a struggling pro-Soviet regime, led to harsh international criticisms and a boycott of the 1980 Summer Olympics, which was held in Moscow. U.S. president Jimmy Carter boosted the budget of the U.S. Department of Defense and began financial aid to the office of Pakistan president Muhammad Zia-ul-Haq, who, in turn, subsidized the anti-Soviet radical Islamist group of Afghan mujahideen fighters.

Another contributing factor in the decline in the popularity of détente as a desirable U.S. policy was the inter-service rivalry between the U.S. State Department and Department of Defense. From 1973 to 1977, there were three secretaries worth mentioning: Elliot Richardson, James Schlesinger, and Donald Rumsfeld. Schlesinger's tenure as secretary of defense was plagued by notably poor relations with Kissinger, one of the most prominent advocates of détente in the U.S. Their poor working relationship bled into their professional relationship, and policy clashes would increasingly occur. They ultimately resulted in Schlesinger's dismissal in 1975. However, his replacement, Rumsfeld, had similar issues with Kissinger although their disagreements stemmed more from domestic resistance to détente. As a result, clashes on policy continued between the State and the Defense Departments. Rumsfeld thought that Kissinger was too complacent about the growing Soviet strength. Although Rumsfeld largely agreed with Kissinger's stance that the U.S. held military superiority over the Soviet Union, he argued that Kissinger's public optimism would prevent Congress from allowing the Defense Department the funds that Rumsfeld believed were required to maintain the favorable gap between the US and the Soviets. Rumsfeld responded by regularly presenting a more alarmist view of the superior strength of the Soviets.

In response to the stranglehold of influence by Kissinger in the Nixon and Ford administrations and the later decline in influence over foreign policy by the Department of Defense, Richardson, Schlesinger, and Rumsfeld all used the growing antipathy in the U.S. for the Soviet Union to undermine Kissinger's attempts to achieve a comprehensive arms reduction treaty. That helped to portray the entire notion of détente as an untenable policy.

The 1980 U.S. presidential election saw Reagan elected on a platform opposed to the concessions of détente. Negotiations on SALT II were abandoned as a result. However, during the later years of his presidency, Reagan and Soviet General Secretary Gorbachev pursued a policy that was considered to be détente. However, the Reagan administration talked about a "winnable" nuclear war and led to the creation of the Strategic Defense Initiative and the Third World policy of funding irregular and paramilitary death squads in Central America, sub-Saharan Africa, Cambodia, and Afghanistan.

== Cuban thaw ==
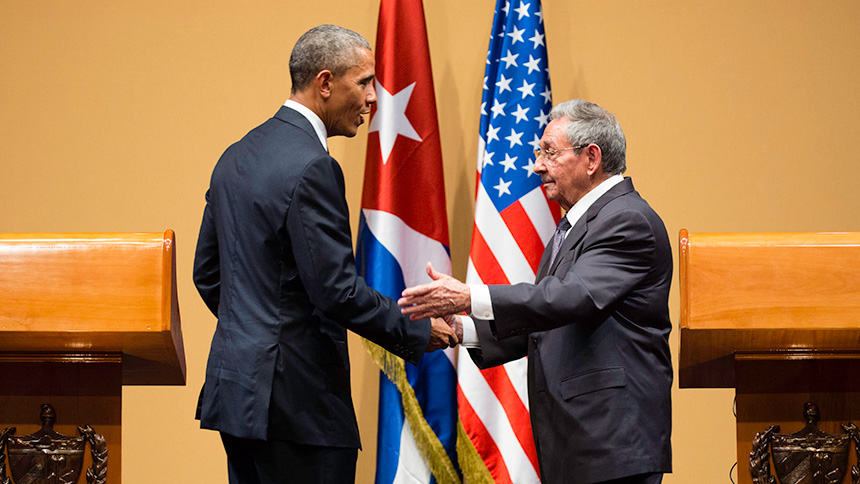
Barack Obama and Raúl Castro at a press conference in Havana in 2016

On 17 December 2014, U.S. president Barack Obama and Cuba president Raúl Castro resolved to restore diplomatic relations between Cuba and the U.S. The restoration agreement had been negotiated in secret in the preceding months. The negotiations were facilitated by Pope Francis and hosted mostly by the Canadian government, which had warmer relations with Cuba at that time. Meetings were held in both Canada and the Vatican City. The agreement would see some U.S. travel restrictions lifted, fewer restrictions on remittances, greater access to the Cuban financial system for U.S. banks, and the reopening of the U.S. embassy in Havana and the Cuban embassy in Washington, which both closed in 1961 after the breakup of diplomatic relations as a result of Cuba's alliance with the Soviet Union.

On 14 April 2015, the Obama administration announced the removal of Cuba from the State Sponsors of Terrorism list. Cuba was officially removed from the list on 29 May 2015. On 20 July 2015, the Cuban and U.S. interest sections in Washington and Havana were upgraded to embassies. On 20 March 2016, Obama became the first U.S. president to visit Cuba since Calvin Coolidge visited in 1928. In 2017, Donald Trump, Obama's successor, stated that he was "canceling" the Obama administration's deals with Cuba, while also expressing that a new deal could be negotiated between the Cuban and U.S. governments.

== See also ==
- Appeasement
- Containment
- Entente (alliance)
- Nordpolitik
- Ostpolitik
- Peaceful coexistence
- Rollback
- Russian reset
- Sunshine Policy
- Wandel durch Handel

== Works cited ==
- Garthoff, Raymond L. (1985). Detente and Confrontation: American-Soviet Relations From Nixon to Reagan. The Brookings Institution. ISBN 978-0-8157-3044-6.
- Grynaviski, Eric (2014). Constructive Illusions: Misperceiving the Origins of International Cooperation. Cornell University Press. ISBN 978-0-8014-5206-2. JSTOR 10.7591/j.ctt1287f2s.
- Hunt, Michael (2015). The World Transformed: 1945 to the Present: A Documentary Reader. New York, NY: Oxford University Press. ISBN 978-0-19-937103-7. OCLC 870439207.
- Keiger, John F. V. (1983). France and the Origins of the First World War. ISBN 9781349172092.
- Kissinger, Henry (1995). Diplomacy. Simon and Schuster. ISBN 0-671-51099-1. OCLC 32350622.
- Lapennal, Ivo (1977). Human Rights: Soviet Theory and Practice, Helsinki and International Law. Eastern Press.
- Nuti, Leopoldo (2008). The Crisis of Détente in Europe. Taylor & Francis. ISBN 9780203887165.
- Poole, Walter S. (2015). The Decline of Détente: Elliot Richardson, James Schlesinger, and Donald Rumsfeld 1973-1977 (PDF). Cold War Foreign Policy Series: Special Study 7. Historical Office, Office of the Secretary of Defense.
- Rhodes, Richard (2008). Arsenals of Folly: The Making of the Nuclear Arms Race. Knopf Doubleday Publishing Group. ISBN 978-0-375-71394-1.
- Samuels, Richard J., ed. (2005). Encyclopedia of United States National Security. Vol. 1. SAGE Publications. ISBN 978-0-7619-2927-7.
- Simes, Dimitri K. (1980). "The Death of Detente?". International Security. 5 (1): 3–25. doi:10.2307/2538471. JSTOR 2538471. S2CID 154098316.
- Tal, David (2013). ""Absolutes" and "Stages" in the Making and Application of Nixon's SALT Policy". Diplomatic History. 37 (5): 1090–1116. doi:10.1093/dh/dht064. hdl:11590/191484.
