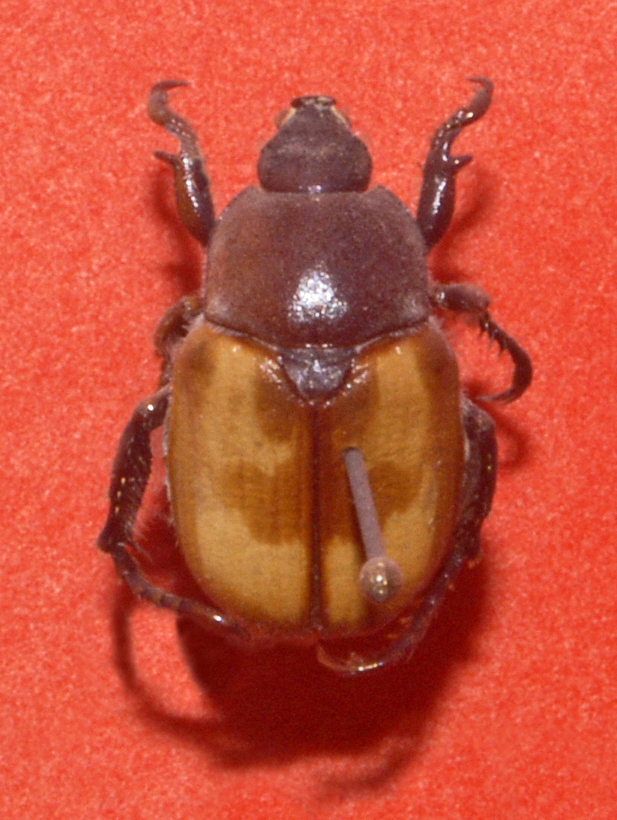
- Anisoplia agricola. Museum specimen

Scientific classification
- Domain: Eukaryota
- Kingdom: Animalia
- Phylum: Arthropoda
- Class: Insecta
- Order: Coleoptera
- Suborder: Polyphaga
- Infraorder: Scarabaeiformia
- Family: Scarabaeidae
- Genus: Anisoplia
- Species: A. agricola

Binomial name
- Anisoplia agricola (Poda, 1761)

Synonyms
- Anisoplia crucifera; Anisoplia cyathigera Scopoli, 1763; Anisoplia losa

= Anisoplia agricola =

Species of insect

Anisoplia agricola is a species of shining leaf chafers in the family Scarabaeidae.

== Description ==
Anisoplia agricola can reach a length of 11–13 millimetres (0.43–0.51 in). Coloration of the elytrae is quite variable, ranging from greenish black to yellow or reddish with cross-shaped black marks.

== Biology ==
These beetles mainly feed on wild grasses, but can damages crops. They live in steppe and forest-steppe areas.

== Distribution ==
This species is present in most of Europe, in Asia Minor in the Caucasus and in Central Asia from Western Siberia and Kazakhstan up to Mongolia.
