= Russian Embassy School in London =

- Средняя школа при Посольстве России в Великобритании

Location
- 21-23, Pembridge Villas; London, W11 3EP; United Kingdom; 51.5133753°N 0.1968167°W

Information
- Website: ukruschool.ru

The Russian Embassy School in London (Russian: Средняя школа при Посольстве России в Великобритании, romanized: Srednyaya shkola pri Posolstve Rossii v Velikobritanii) is a Russian international school in the Royal Borough of Kensington and Chelsea, London. As of 2015 the school has 150 students. It is operated by the Russian Ministry of Foreign Affairs.

The school accepts students from Russian diplomat families. The Russian Ambassador may decide whether or not a student not from a diplomatic family will get enrollment in the school.

It was founded in 1954, and was previously the Soviet Embassy School in London.

It was reported in 2025 that the school was providing instruction on "combat skills" including the use of battlefield drones following curriculum changes in the aftermath of the 2022 Russian invasion of Ukraine.

== Notable students ==
- Viktor Sukhodrev (when it was the Soviet Embassy School in London)

== See also ==
- Russians in the United Kingdom
