= Kuzma's mother =

Character in a Russian idiom describing punishment

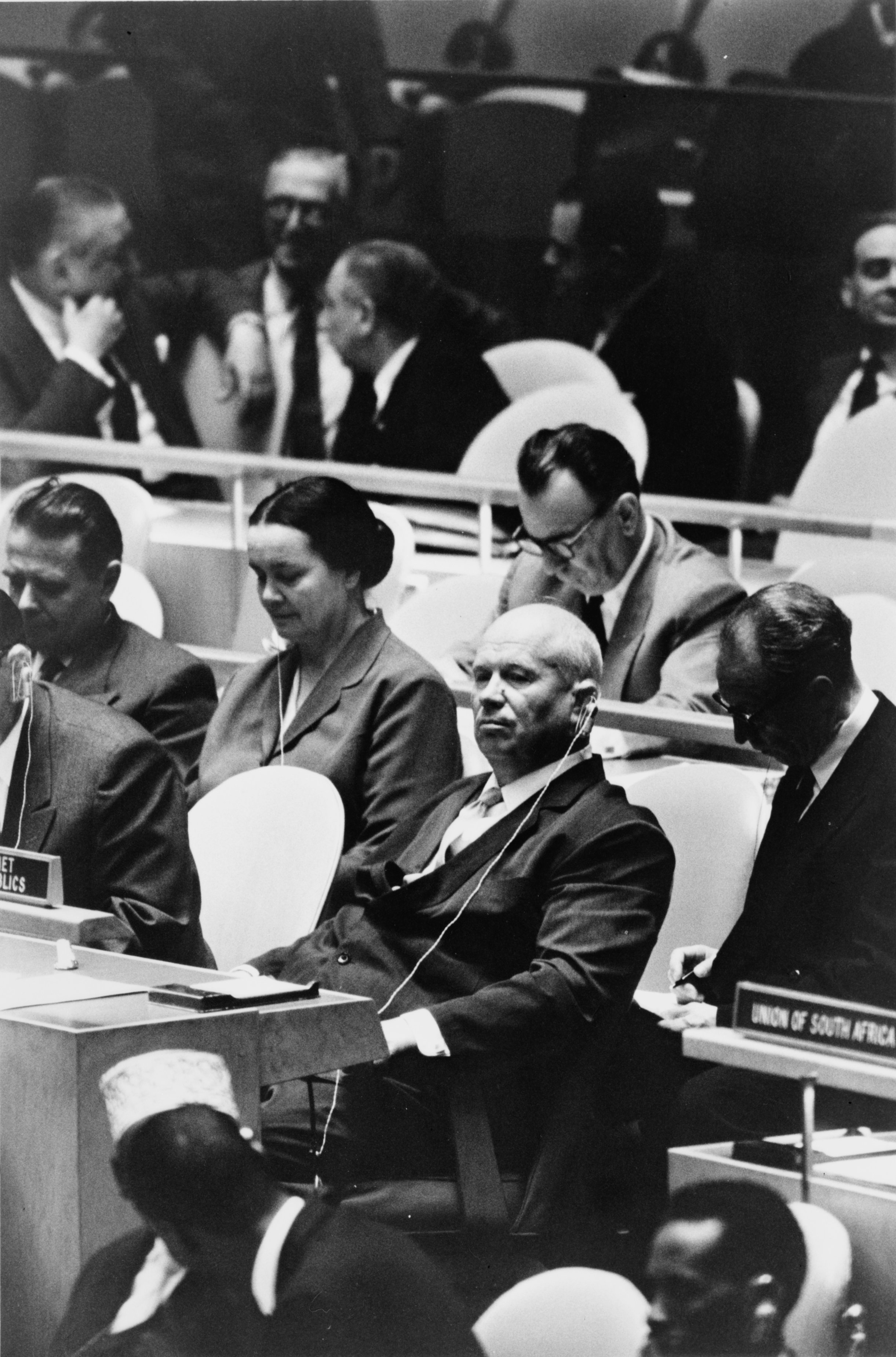
Nikita Khrushchev, 1960

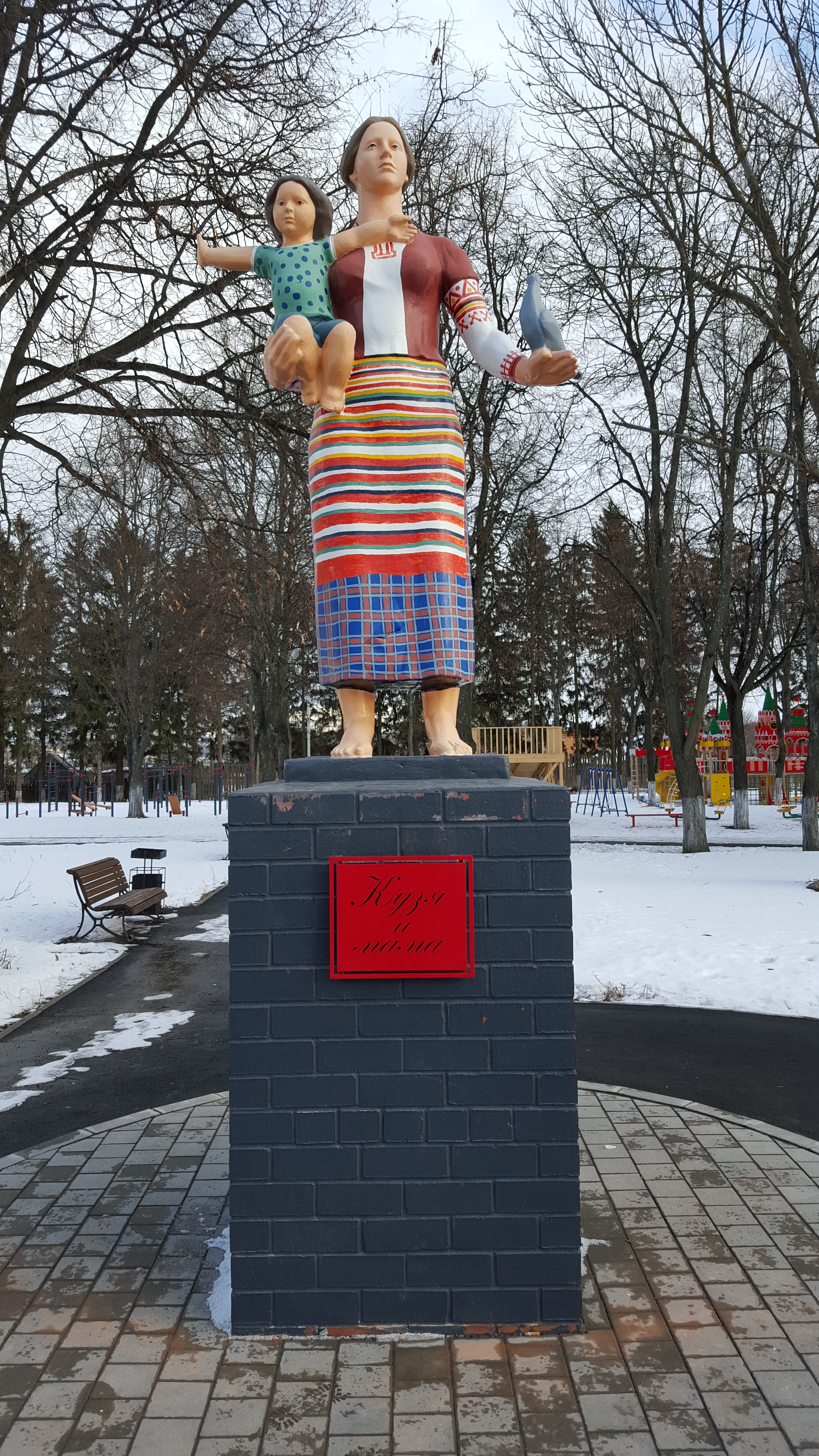
Humorous monument of Kuzka and his mother in Odoyev

Kuzma's mother, or Kuzka's mother (Russian: кузькина мать, romanized: kuz'kina mat', IPA: [ˈkusʲkʲɪnə ˈmatʲ]; Kuzka is a diminutive of the given name Kuzma), is part of the Russian proverb "to show Kuzka's mother (to someone)" (Russian: Показать кузькину мать (кому-либо) – [pɐkɐˈzatʲ ˈkusʲkʲɪnʊ ˈmatʲ (kɐˈmulʲɪbə)], Pokazat kuzkinu mat (komu-libo)), an expression of an unspecified threat or punishment, such as "to teach someone a lesson", "to punish someone in a brutal way", and "to give someone what for". It entered the history of the foreign relations of the Soviet Union as part of the image of Nikita Khrushchev, along with the shoe-banging incident and the phrase "We will bury you".

In his memoirs, Khrushchev mentions various "interesting and peculiar situations", including an occasion of him using the expression, but he mentioned that it was not the first time it confused the translators. The footnote in the volume to this item says that the 1999 Russian edition gave a mistaken "scientific etymology" of the expression derived from the folk name, Kuzka the bug, of the pest insect Anisoplia austriaca, which overwinters deep under the soil, making it difficult to uncover. According to the editors, this was guesswork on the part of an annotator.

During a discussion about communism and capitalism, Khrushchev boasted that the Soviet Union will "catch up with and surpass" (Russian: догонит и перегонит, romanized: dogonit i peregonit) the United States, and "we shall show you Kuzka's mother". The stunned interpreter said something literal about the mother of Kuzma.

Phraseological dictionaries from the 19th century record other versions of the saying about Kuzka's mother, such as "to let someone know Kuzka's mother's name", or "to learn Kuzka's mother's name".

Because of the phrase's use in Cold War diplomacy, it became a code word for the atomic bomb. In particular, the Tsar Bomba had a yield of 50 MT and was a thermonuclear test device, nicknamed "Kuzka's mother" by its builders.
