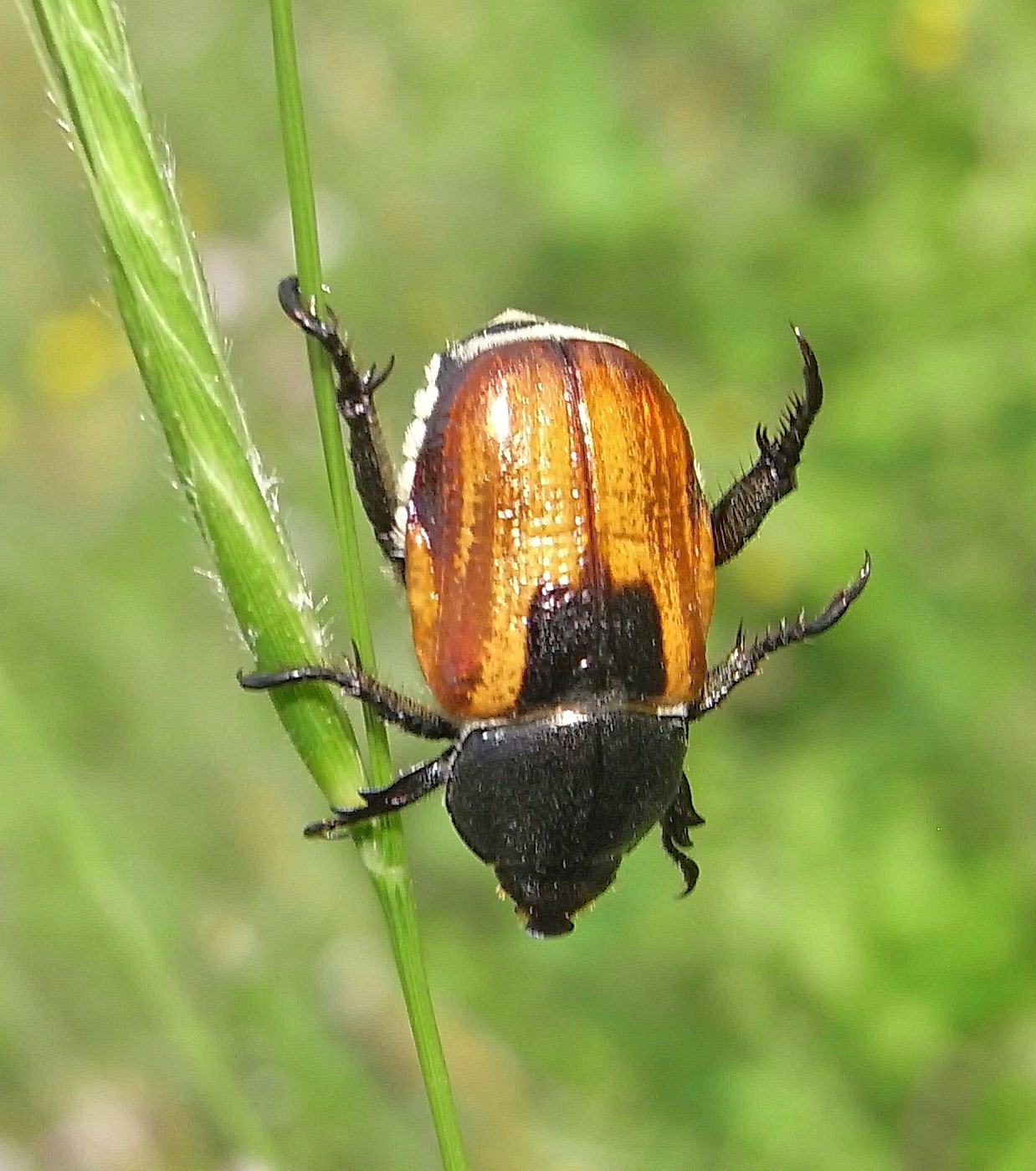

Scientific classification
- Kingdom: Animalia
- Phylum: Arthropoda
- Class: Insecta
- Order: Coleoptera
- Suborder: Polyphaga
- Infraorder: Scarabaeiformia
- Family: Scarabaeidae
- Genus: Anisoplia
- Species: A. austriaca

Binomial name
- Anisoplia austriaca (Herbst, 1783)

= Anisoplia austriaca =

Species of beetle

Anisoplia austriaca is the binomial name of a species of scarab beetle, a harmful pest of cereal crops. Its body length is 12–16 mm.

== Area of distribution ==
Anisoplia is distributed in the steppe zones of Europe, Asia Minor, Iran. The beetle is a major pest in the lower and middle Volga and steppe regions of Ukraine, North Caucasus and Transcaucasia.

== Life cycle ==
The beetle has a two-year development cycle. The larvae feed on plant roots and humus. The larvae pupate in late May. In late June, adult beetles surface from the soil.

The adult beetles feed on cereals such as rye, wheat or barley, consuming the more immature plants. Female beetles lay their eggs 10–12 days after emergence. Each cluster may contain up to 50 eggs. After three weeks the larvae hatch and the cycle begins anew.

== Behaviour ==
The beetles prefer daylight and are most active in sunny weather. They appear on the plants in the morning; at night they crawl away to shelter in clods or cracks in the soil.

== In popular culture ==
The Russian idiomatic expression "to show Kuzma's mother to someone", meaning "to teach someone a lesson", became popular after Nikita Khrushchev used it during a speech at the United Nations. In his memories, he mentions various "interesting and peculiar situations", including an occasion of him using this expression while mentioning that it was not the first time it confused the translators. The footnote in this volume to this item says that the 1999 Russian edition gave a mistaken "scientific etymology" of the expression derived from the folk name Kuzka the bug of the pest insect Anisoplia austriaca, which overwinters deep under the soil, so it is hard to uncover it. According to the editors, this was guesswork on the part of an annotator who was suffering from an illness.
