= We will bury you =

1956 quote by Soviet leader Nikita Khrushchev

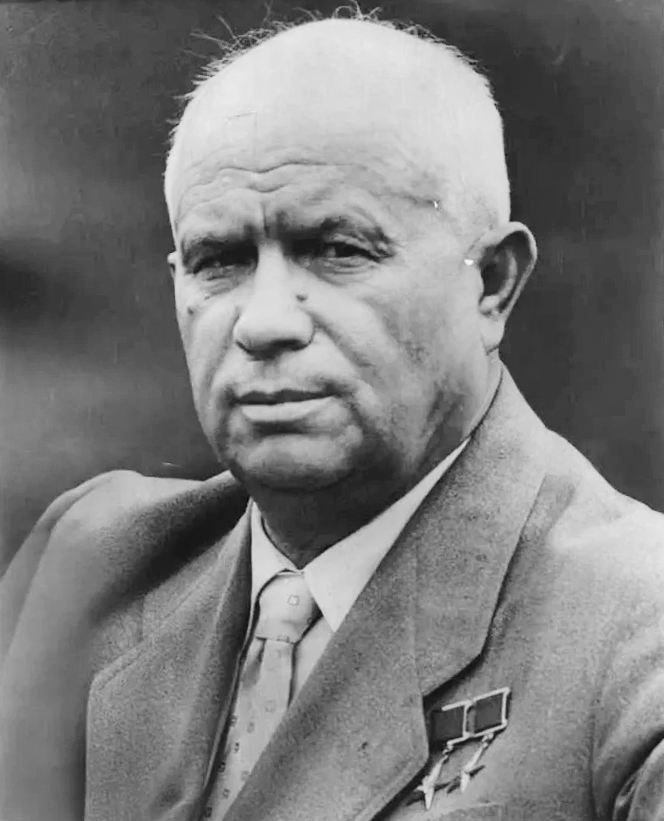
Nikita Khrushchev in 1957

"We will bury you" (Russian: «Мы вас похороним!», romanized: "My vas pokhoronim!") is a phrase that was used by Soviet leader Nikita Khrushchev while addressing Western ambassadors at a reception at the Polish embassy in Moscow on November 18, 1956. The phrase was originally translated into English by Khrushchev's personal interpreter Viktor Sukhodrev. The phrase was received very negatively by contemporary Western audiences, but some modern translators have suggested the phrase was misinterpreted or mistranslated.

== History ==
While addressing the Western states at the Polish embassy in Moscow on November 18, 1956, in the presence of communist Polish politician Władysław Gomułka (with Poland being a Soviet-influenced satellite state at the time), Nikita Khrushchev made statements that were translated as:

About the capitalist states, it doesn't depend on you whether or not we exist. If you don't like us, don't accept our invitations, and don't invite us to come to see you. Whether you like it or not, history is on our side. We will bury you!

The speech prompted the envoys from twelve NATO nations and Israel to leave the room.

During Khrushchev's visit to the United States in 1959, Los Angeles mayor Norris Poulson addressed Khrushchev:

We do not agree with your widely quoted phrase 'We shall bury you.' You shall not bury us and we shall not bury you. We are happy with our way of life. We recognize its shortcomings and are always trying to improve it. But if challenged, we shall fight to the death to preserve it.

Many Americans meanwhile interpreted Khrushchev's quote as a nuclear threat.

In another public speech, Khrushchev declared: "We must take a shovel and dig a deep grave, and bury colonialism as deep as we can". In a 1961 speech at the Institute of Marxism–Leninism in Moscow, Khrushchev said that "peaceful coexistence" for the Soviet Union means "intense, economic, political and ideological struggle between the proletariat and the aggressive forces of imperialism in the world arena". Later, on August 24, 1963, Khrushchev remarked in his speech in Yugoslavia, "I once said, 'We will bury you,' and I got into trouble with it. Of course we will not bury you with a shovel. Your own working class will bury you", a reference to the Marxist saying, "The proletariat is the undertaker of capitalism" (in the Russian translation of Marx, the word "undertaker" is translated as a "grave digger", Russian: могильщик), based on the concluding statement in Chapter 1 of the Communist Manifesto: "What the bourgeoisie therefore produces, above all, are its own grave-diggers. Its fall and the victory of the proletariat are equally inevitable". In his memoirs, Khrushchev stated that "enemy propaganda picked up the slogan and blew it all out of proportion".

Khrushchev was known for his oftentimes emotional and volatile public image. His daughter admitted that:

he was known for strong language, interrupting speakers, banging his fists on the table in protest, pounding his feet, even whistling. ... manner, which suited his goal... to be different from the hypocrites of the West, with their appropriate words but calculated deeds

== Alternative translations ==
Many authors have argued that "we will bury you" was misinterpreted as a threat of military violence by the USSR against the US and other capitalist countries, when what was meant to be said was that the communist system would outlast and replace capitalism, as predicted by classical Marxist doctrine, and hence "we will bury you" essentially meant "we will survive you" or "we (communists) will live to see you (capitalists) buried". Therefore, alternative translations have been suggested to convey this meaning more accurately. A frequently proposed variant is "We shall be present at your funeral". In the metaphor used by Khrushchev, Russia's role was to take care of the funeral arrangements for capitalism after its demise. It has, additionally, been claimed that the overhead hand clasp gesture reportedly used by Khrushchev in conjunction with the phrase contributed to the misinterpretation due to cultural differences.

Mikhail Gorbachev suggested in his book Perestroika and New Thinking for Our Country and the World that the image used by Khrushchev was inspired by the acute discussions among Soviet agrarian scientists in the 1930s, nicknamed "who will bury whom", the bitterness of which can only be understood by the prevalence of Soviet pseudoscientific Lysenkoist theory at the time.

== In popular culture ==
- Khrushchev's phrase was used as the title of Jan Šejna's book on communist Cold War strategies, and a 1962 documentary called We'll Bury You.
- The phrase appears in Sting's song "Russians" (1985).
- In the opening scene of the 2020 film The Courier, Khrushchev closes his speech with the same words.
- In the 2017 film The Death of Stalin, Khrushchev declares "I will bury you in history", at the death of Lavrentiy Beria.
- In the 2024 film Soundtrack to a Coup d'Etat, this phrase (and direct contemporary commentary on the accuracy of its original translation) are featured prominently.

== See also ==
- Kuzma's mother
- Shoe-banging incident
- We begin bombing in five minutes
