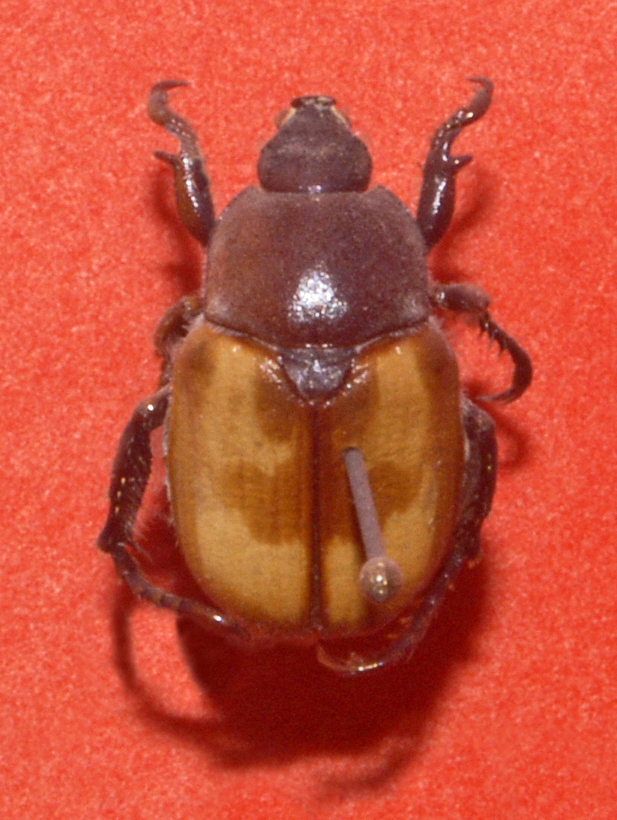
- Anisoplia agricola

Scientific classification
- Domain: Eukaryota
- Kingdom: Animalia
- Phylum: Arthropoda
- Class: Insecta
- Order: Coleoptera
- Suborder: Polyphaga
- Infraorder: Scarabaeiformia
- Family: Scarabaeidae
- Genus: Anisoplia; Schönherr, 1817

= Anisoplia =

Genus of beetles

Anisoplia is a genus of shining leaf chafers in the family Scarabaeidae.

== Species ==
- Anisoplia agricola (Poda, 1761)
- Anisoplia andreae Baraud, 1991
- Anisoplia aprica Erichson, 1847
- Anisoplia armeniaca Kraatz, 1883
- Anisoplia austriaca (Herbst, 1783)
- Anisoplia babylonicaPetrovitz, 1973
- Anisoplia baetica Erichson, 1847
- Anisoplia brenskei Reitter, 1889
- Anisoplia bromicola (Germar, 1817)
- Anisoplia bulgarica Apfelbeck, 1909
- Anisoplia bureschi Zacharieva-Stoilova, 1958
- Anisoplia campicola Ménétriès, 1832
- Anisoplia depressa Erichson, 1847
- Anisoplia deserticola Fischer von Waldheim, 1824
- Anisoplia dispar Erichson, 1847
- Anisoplia erichsoni Reitter, 1883
- Anisoplia faldermanni Reitter, 1883
- Anisoplia ferruginipes Pic, 1901
- Anisoplia flavipennis Brullé, 1832
- Anisoplia hebes Reitter, 1903
- Anisoplia hebrothracica Král, 1996
- Anisoplia imitatrix Apfelbeck, 1909
- Anisoplia insolita Baraud, 1991
- Anisoplia lanuginosa Erichson, 1847
- Anisoplia lata Erichson, 1847
- Anisoplia monticola Erichson, 1847
- Anisoplia noahi Petrovitz, 1973
- Anisoplia parva Kraatz, 1883
- Anisoplia phoenissa Zaitev, 1917
- Anisoplia pubipennis Blanchard, 1850
- Anisoplia pumila Marseul, 1878
- Anisoplia remota Reitter, 1889
- Anisoplia sabatinellii Baraud, 1991
- Anisoplia signata Faldermann, 1835
- Anisoplia taocha Zaitzev, 1917
- Anisoplia tempestiva Erichson, 1847
- Anisoplia tenebralis Burmeister, 1844
- Anisoplia thessalica Reitter, 1889
- Anisoplia tritici Burmeister, 1855
- Anisoplia villosa (Goeze, 1777)
- Anisoplia zwickii Fischer von Waldheim, 1824
