= Thor's gavel =

Gavel used in the UN General Assembly

- Þórshamar (Icelandic), Ásmundarnautur (Icelandic)
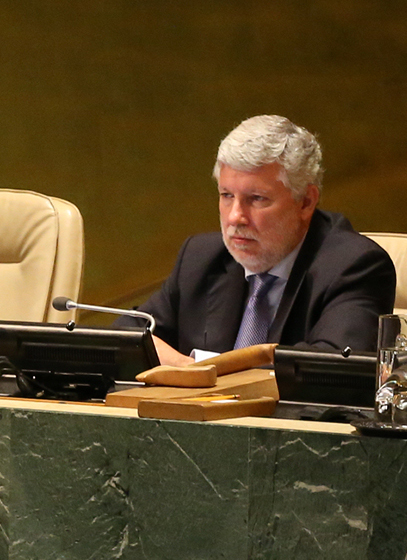
- Thor's gavel in 2018
- Artist: Ásmundur Sveinsson
- Year: 1952
- Designation: Gavel
- Location: New York, New York, U.S.
- Owner: General Assembly of the United Nations

Thor's gavel (Icelandic: Þórshamar), also known as Ásmundarnautur, is a ceremonial gavel, designed by sculptor Ásmundur Sveinsson, and originally given by Iceland and delivered to the General Assembly of the United Nations by ambassador Thor Thors in 1952. It is engraved with the phrase from Codex Holmiensis "Society must be built on the basis of laws" (Icelandic: Með lögum skal land byggja) in both Icelandic and Latin. It is used by the President of the United Nations General Assembly and at the end of the General Assembly the gavel is ceremoniously passed from the current President to the next President.

The first version of the gavel was used until 12 October 1960 when Assembly President Frederick Boland slammed it down so hard that the head broke off and went flying during Nikita Khrushchev's shoe-banging incident.

An exact copy of the gavel, made by Jón Benediktsson, was given to the United Nations in 1961 and served the General Assembly until its disappearance in 2005.

The third edition of the gavel was made by Sigríður Kristjánsdóttir (Sigga á Grund) and given to the UN in 2005. During the seventy-eighth session of the United Nations General Assembly, the gavel broke once again. This time, the gavel was repaired afterwards.
