= Diplomacy (Kissinger book) =

1994 book by Henry Kissinger

- First edition
- Author: Henry Kissinger
- Language: English
- Subject: Diplomacy
- Publisher: Simon & Schuster
- Publication date: 1994
- Publication place: United States
- Pages: 912
- ISBN: 0-671-51099-1
- OCLC: 32350622

Diplomacy is a 1994 book written by former United States National Security Advisor and Secretary of State Henry Kissinger.

== Summary ==
The book offers a sweeping history of international relations and the art of diplomacy that largely concentrates on the 20th century and the Western World. Kissinger, as a great believer in the realist school (realism) of international relations, focuses strongly on the concepts of the balance of power in Europe prior to World War I, raison d'État and Realpolitik throughout the ages of diplomatic relations. Kissinger also provides realist critiques of diplomatic tactics of collective security, which was developed in the Charter of the League of Nations, and self-determination, which was also a principle of the League. Kissinger also examines the use of the sphere of influence arguments put forth by the Soviet Union in Eastern and Southern Europe after World War II, an argument that has been maintained by contemporary Russian foreign relations with regard to Ukraine, Georgia and other former Soviet satellites in Central Asia.

The history begins in Europe in the 17th century but quickly advances up to the World Wars and then the Cold War. Kissinger refers to himself numerous times in the book, especially when he recounts the Richard Nixon and Gerald Ford presidencies. The book ends with the argument that the US after the Cold War world should return to European style realpolitik and abandon Wilsonian idealism, arguing that American survival requires tough choices based on unvarnished appraisals of the global situation, not utopian ideals. But he cautioned that realpolitik is not some sort of an automatic 'cure-all' for all diplomatic or political dilemmas.

Kissinger dedicated the book to the men and women of the United States Foreign Service.

== Praise ==
In a New York Times review the book was likened to Machiavelli's classic 'Discourses' and predicted that in future it will be read, like Machiavelli's book, "for its wisdom".

== Criticism ==
The book was criticized by historian Ernest R. May for historical inaccuracies, such as Kissinger's assertion that the concept of self-determination was unknown to European statesmen until it was championed by President Woodrow Wilson.

== Chapters ==
=== The New World Order ===
1. The Hinge: Theodore Roosevelt or Woodrow Wilson
2. From Universality to Equilibrium: Richelieu, William of Orange, and Pitt
3. The Concert of Europe: Great Britain, Austria, and Russia
4. Two Revolutionaries: Napoleon III and Bismarck
5. Realpolitik Turns on Itself
6. A Political Doomsday Machine: European Diplomacy Before the First World War
7. Into the Vortex: The Military Doomsday Machine
8. The New Face of Diplomacy: Wilson and the Treaty of Versailles
9. The Dilemmas of the Victors
10. Stresemann and the Re-emergence of the Vanquished
11. The End of Illusion: Hitler and the Destruction of Versailles
12. Stalin's Bazaar
13. The Nazi-Soviet Pact
14. America Re-enters the Arena: Franklin Delano Roosevelt
15. Three Approaches to Peace: Roosevelt, Stalin, and Churchill in World War II
16. The Beginning of the Cold War
17. The Success and the Pain of Containment
18. The Dilemma of Containment: The Korean War
19. Negotiating with the Communists: Adenauer, Churchill, and Eisenhower
20. Leapfrogging Containment: The Suez Crisis
21. Hungary: Upheaval in the Empire
22. Khrushchev's Ultimatum: The Berlin Crisis 1958-63
23. Concepts of Western Unity: Macmillan, de Gaulle, Eisenhower, and Kennedy
24. Vietnam: Entry into the Morass; Truman and Eisenhower
25. Vietnam: On the Road to Despair; Kennedy, and Johnson
26. Vietnam: The Extrication; Nixon
27. Foreign Policy as Geopolitics: Nixon's Triangular Diplomacy
28. Détente and Its Discontents
29. The End of the Cold War: Reagan and Gorbachev
30. The New World Order Reconsidered

A leather-bound, gold-embossed edition of the book was published by the Easton Press and signed by Kissinger.

The book appears in the film Muppet Treasure Island, in which The Great Gonzo pulls it out of Billy Bones' sea chest.
