= Viktor Sukhodrev =

Russian diplomat and translator (1932–2014)

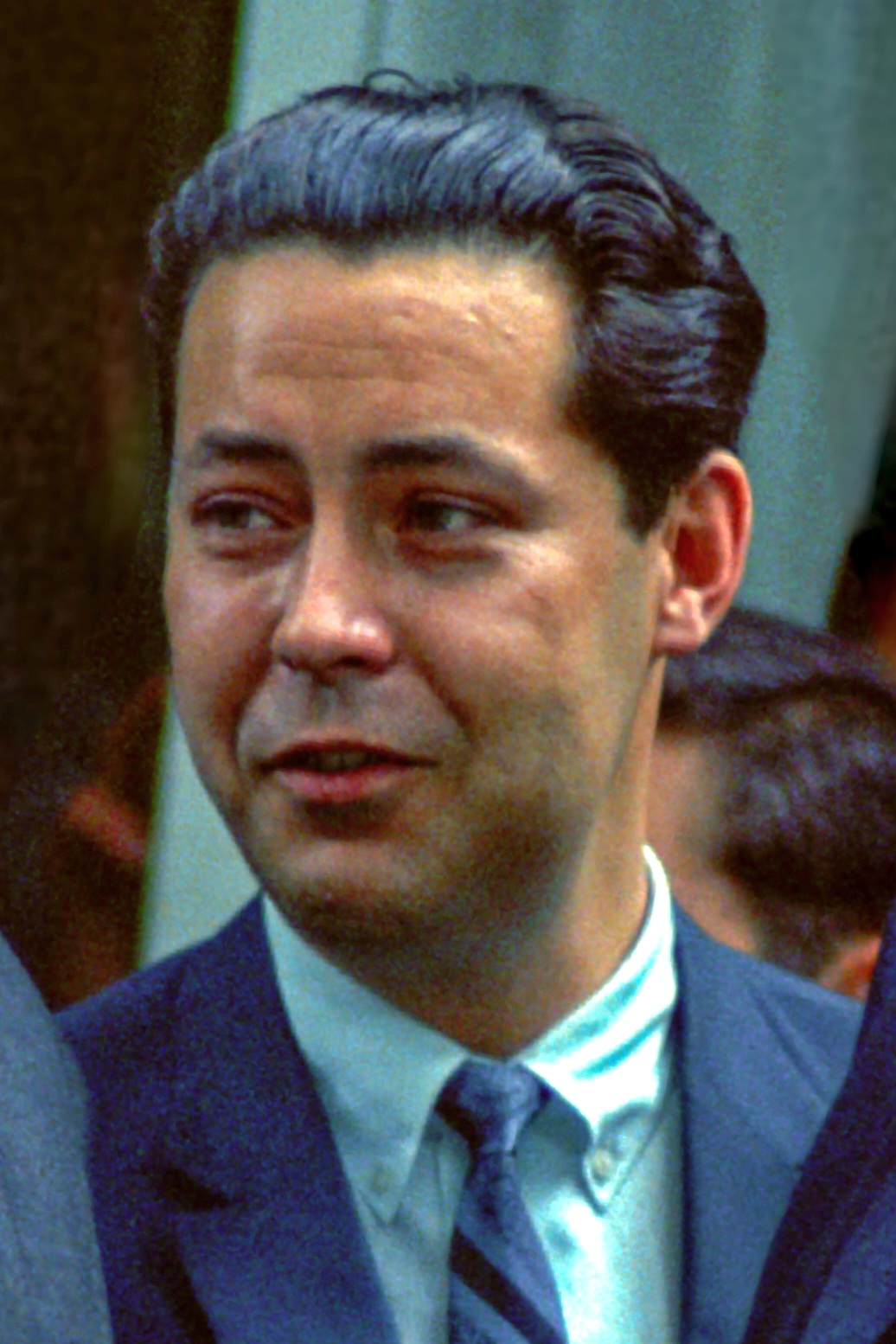
- Sukhodrev in Glassboro Summit Conference, June 1967
- Born: Viktor Mikhailovich Sukhodrev; 12 December 1932; Kaunas, Lithuania
- Died: 16 May 2014 (aged 81); Moscow, Russia
- Occupations: Linguistic interpreter and translator
- Spouses: Inna Kmit (divorced) Inga Okunevskaya (died)
- Children: 1

Viktor Mikhailovich Sukhodrev (Russian: Виктор Михайлович Суходрев; 12 December 1932 – 16 May 2014) was a Soviet and Russian diplomat and translator, known for being a personal interpreter for Soviet leaders Nikita Khrushchev, Leonid Brezhnev and Mikhail Gorbachev, as well as high-ranking Soviet politicians including Alexei Kosygin, Andrei Gromyko, Anastas Mikoyan, and Frol Kozlov.

== Family and education ==
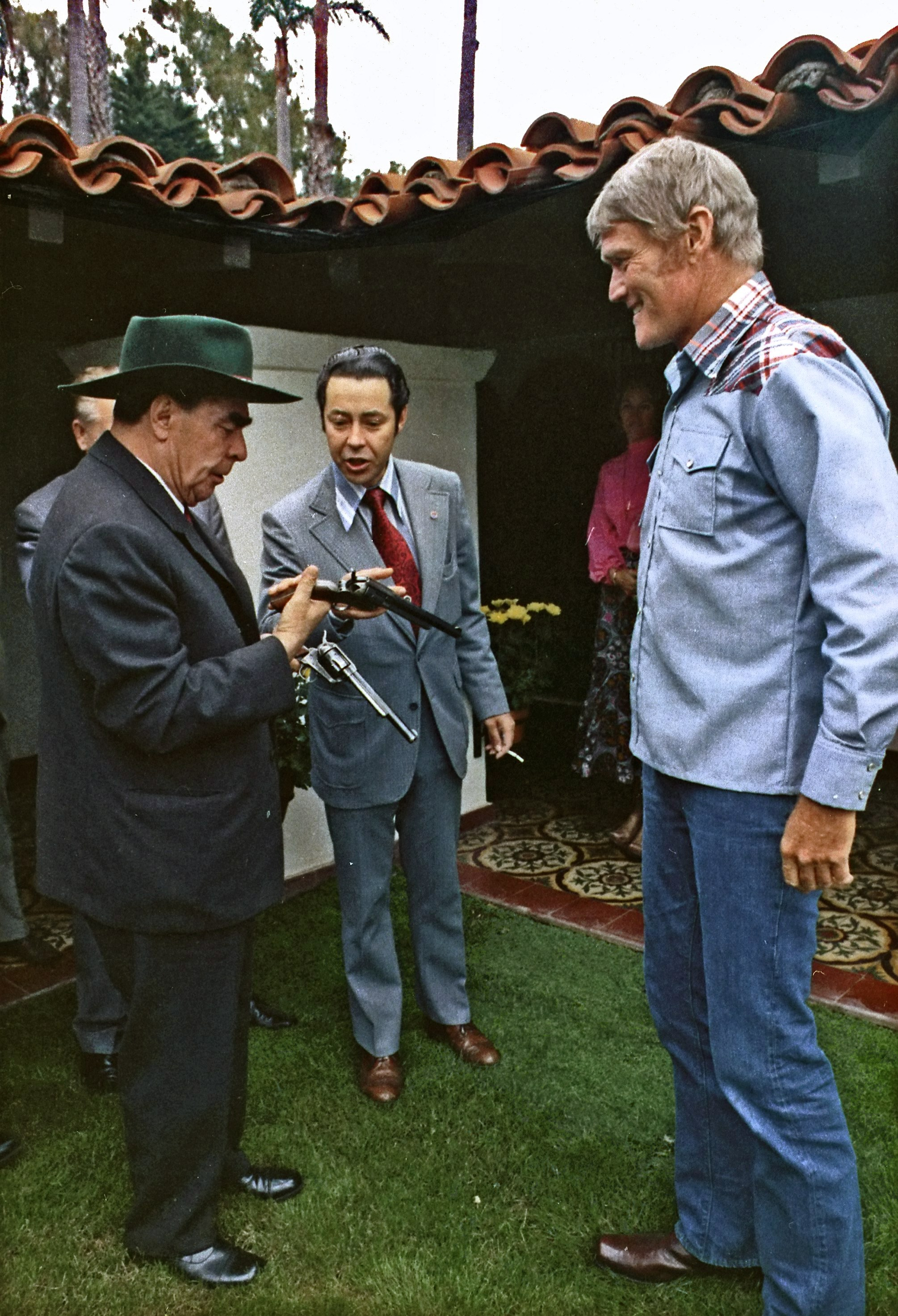
Leonid Brezhnev (left) and Viktor Sukhodrev meeting filmstar Chuck Connors in California during Brezhnev's visit to USA in 1973

Viktor Sukhodrev was born into the family of two Soviet intelligence officers. His father, Mikhail Sukhodrev worked under diplomatic cover in the United States. As a young boy during World War II, Sukhodrev spent six years in London with his mother, an intelligence operative who worked undercover at the Soviet trade mission. He attended the Soviet Embassy School in London beginning at age 8. He returned to Moscow at the age of 12 and later graduated from the Military Institute of Foreign Languages.

== Career ==
In 1956, Sukhodrev began his career in the translation bureau of the Ministry of Foreign Affairs (MFA). Sukhodrev translated Nikita Khrushchev's famous quote "We will bury you", among others. In the 1980s, Sukhodrev was the deputy head of the department for the United States and Canada at the Soviet MFA. In 1999, he penned the memoir book Язык мой – друг мой (My Tongue – My Friend).

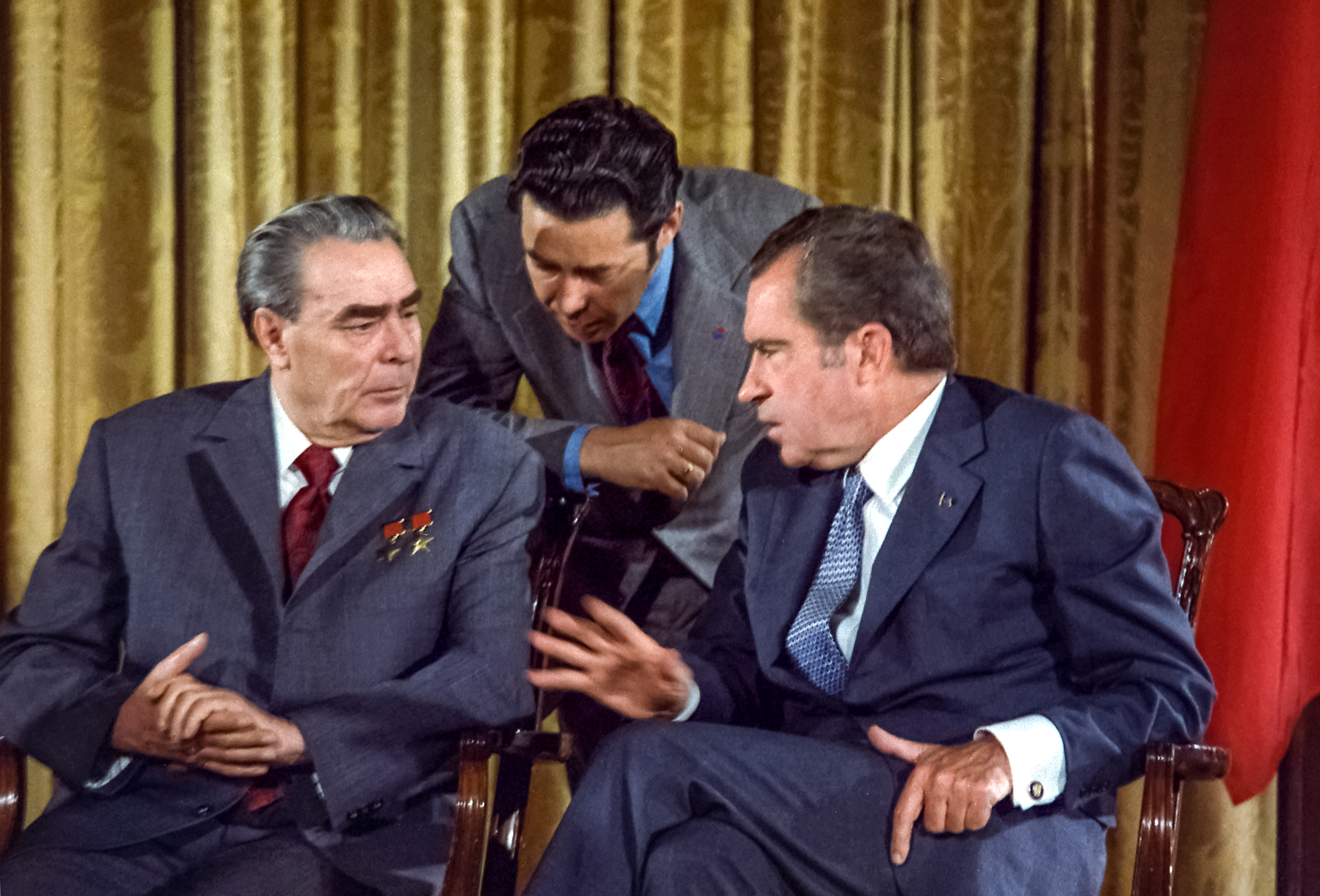
Sukhodrev interpreting a conversation between Soviet General Secretary Leonid Brezhnev (left) and American President Richard Nixon (right), 1973

During a career of nearly thirty years, Sukhodrev was present at numerous high-profile summits and deal-makings. Richard Nixon called Sukhodrev "a superb linguist who spoke English as well as he did Russian", while Henry Kissinger called him "unflappable" and a "splendid interpreter". According to the International Herald Tribune, "Sukhodrev was present but not present, emptying himself of ego, slipping into the skin of the man who was speaking, feeling his feelings, saying his words".

Soviet and U.S. officials alike considered him to be the best interpreter in the world between Russian and English and he would sometimes be the only interpreter at bilateral meetings. He had a very good understanding of idiomatic expressions in English with a firm grasp of the varied nuances of meaning in different parts of the English-speaking world. His memory was prodigious: he only required a few notes to be able to deliver a perfect translation of a 20-minute speech. In 2012, Sukhodrev received the Russian national prize Translator of the Year.

== Personal life ==
Sukhodrev was married twice. His first wife was actress Inna Kmit, with whom he had a son. His second wife was Inga Okunevskaya, a professor of English, who predeceased him. Sukhodrev died in Moscow on 16 May 2014 at the age of 81.
