= Iceland–European Union relations =

- European Union: Iceland

Iceland is heavily integrated into the European Union via the Agreement on the European Economic Area and the Schengen Agreement, despite its status as a non-EU member state. Iceland applied for membership in 2009, but the Minister for Foreign Affairs sent a letter in 2015 that ended the application process. The application was never formally withdrawn, and the accession process remained dormant until 2024, when a new government revived the question of EU membership. A referendum was held on 29 August 2026 and was defeated; had it passed, it would have provided a mandate to restart negotiations, with any final accession agreement requiring a separate vote.

== Comparison ==
	European Union	Iceland
Population	449,206,579	390,433
Area	4,324,782 km^{2} (1,669,808 sq mi)	102,775 km^{2} (39,682 sq mi)
Population density	104/km^{2} (269/sq mi)	3.79/km^{2} (9.84/sq mi)
Capital	Brussels (de facto)	Reykjavík
Global cities	Amsterdam, Berlin, Brussels, Dublin, Frankfurt, Lisbon, Luxembourg, Madrid, Milan, Munich, Paris, Prague, Rome, Stockholm, Vienna, Warsaw	None
Government	Supranational parliamentary democracy based on the European treaties	Unitary parliamentary republic
Current leaders	President of the European Council António Costa; President of the European Commission Ursula von der Leyen	President Halla Tómasdóttir; Prime Minister Kristrún Frostadóttir
Official languages	24 official languages	Icelandic
Main religions	72% Christianity; 48% Catholic Church; 12% Protestantism; 8% Eastern Orthodoxy; 4% Other Christianity; 23% Non-religious; 3% Other; 2% Islam	63.47% Church of Iceland (Protestant); 2.75% Free Lutheran Church in Reykjavík; 1.98% Free Lutheran Church in Hafnarfjörður; 0.89% Independent Lutheran Congregation; 4.02% Catholic Church; 2.05% Other Christian denominations; 1.31% Ásatrúarfélagið; 0.96% Zuism; 0.42% Buddhism; 0.35% Islam; 14.30% Other and unspecified; 7.17% Unaffiliated
Ethnic groups	Germans (c. 83 million), French (c. 67 million); Italians (c. 60 million); Spanish (c. 47 million); Poles (c. 46 million); Romanians (c. 16 million); Dutch (c. 13 million); Greek (c. 11 million); Portuguese (c. 11 million); and others	89% Icelanders; 5% Poles; 1% Lithuanians; 5% others
GDP (nominal)	$16.477 trillion, $31,801 per capita	$27 billion, $75,700 per capita

== Integration ==
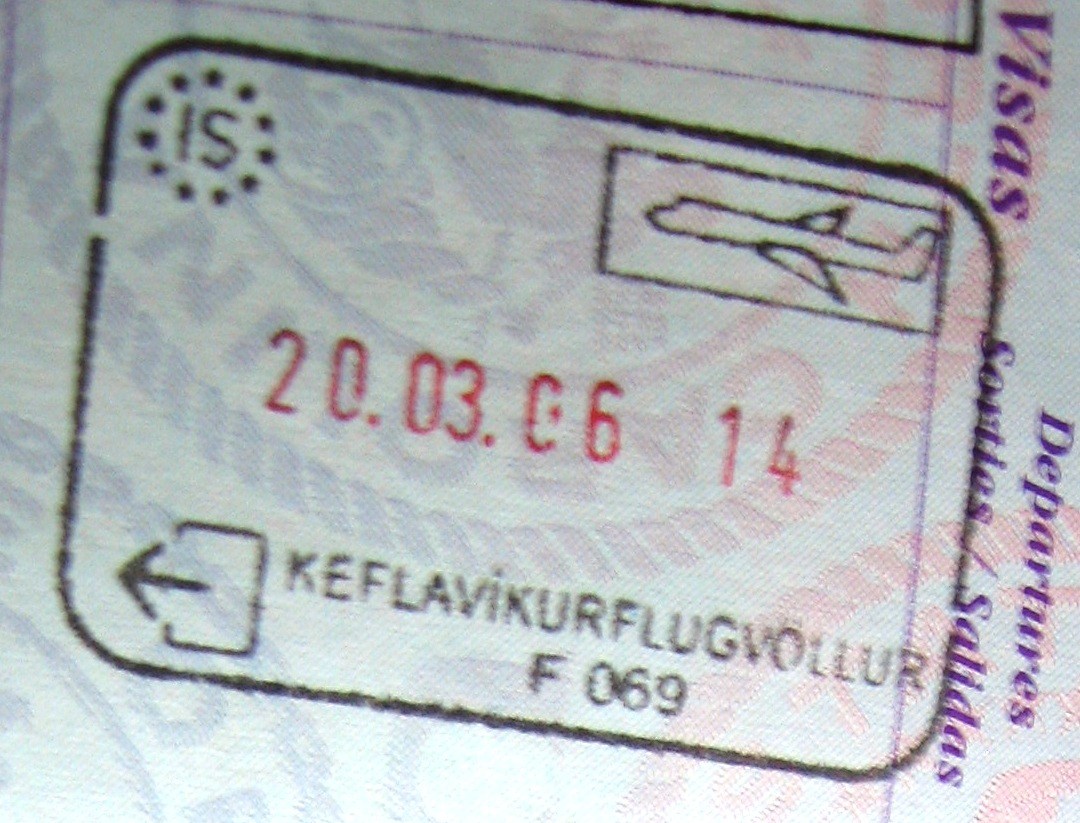
Though Iceland is not in the EU, it is a member of the Schengen area.

Iceland is a member of the European Free Trade Association (EFTA), a grouping of four non-EU European countries, and is also part of the European Economic Area (EEA). Through the EEA, Iceland participates with a non-voting status in certain EU agencies and programmes, including enterprise, environment, education (including the Erasmus Programme) and research programs. Iceland also contributes funds to "social and economic cohesion" in the EU/EEA. Iceland also frequently consults the EU on foreign affairs and frequently aligns itself to EU foreign policy. Iceland also participates in EU civilian peacekeeping missions.

Iceland is a member of the Nordic Passport Union and the Schengen Area, which now is under EU law, as a non-voting participant. Iceland's participation in the Schengen Area allows free movement of people between Iceland and the rest of the Schengen Area. Several thousand Icelanders travel to and study or work in the EU. A large majority of foreigners in Iceland come from the EU. Iceland is also associated with the Dublin Convention on justice and home affairs cooperation. Iceland also has links to several EU member states through its membership of the Nordic Council.

=== Use of the euro ===
During the 2008–2011 Icelandic financial crisis, instability in the Icelandic króna led to discussion in Iceland about adopting the euro. However, Jürgen Stark, a member of the executive board of the European Central Bank, has stated that "Iceland would not be able to adopt the EU currency without first becoming a member of the EU". As of the ECB's May 2012 convergence report, Iceland did not meet any of the convergence criteria. One year later, the country managed to comply with the deficit criteria and had begun to decrease its debt-to-GDP ratio, but still suffered from elevated HICP inflation and long-term governmental interest rates.

=== Reasons for Iceland's non-membership of the European Union ===
Academics have proposed several explanations for why Iceland has not joined the European Union:

- The importance of the fishing industry to Iceland's economy and the perception that EU membership (and its Common Fisheries Policy) will have an adverse effect on the fishing industry.
- The perception that EU membership will have an adverse effect on Iceland's agricultural sector.
- Iceland's strong ties with the United States, which included significant economic, diplomatic and military assistance, decreased Iceland's dependence on European countries.
- The victories in the Cod Wars (1958-1976) may have strengthened Icelandic nationalism and boosted the perception that Iceland can succeed through unilateral or bilateral means rather than compromise in multilateral frameworks.
- The Icelandic electoral system favors rural areas, which are more eurosceptic.
- The tendency for Icelandic elites to pursue education in the United States or eurosceptic European countries (such as the United Kingdom or the Nordic countries), and to cooperate more closely with political elites from those countries.
- Icelandic nationalism and the legacy of Iceland's struggle for national sovereignty.
- The impact of the Icesave dispute with the Netherlands and the UK.

== Trade relations ==
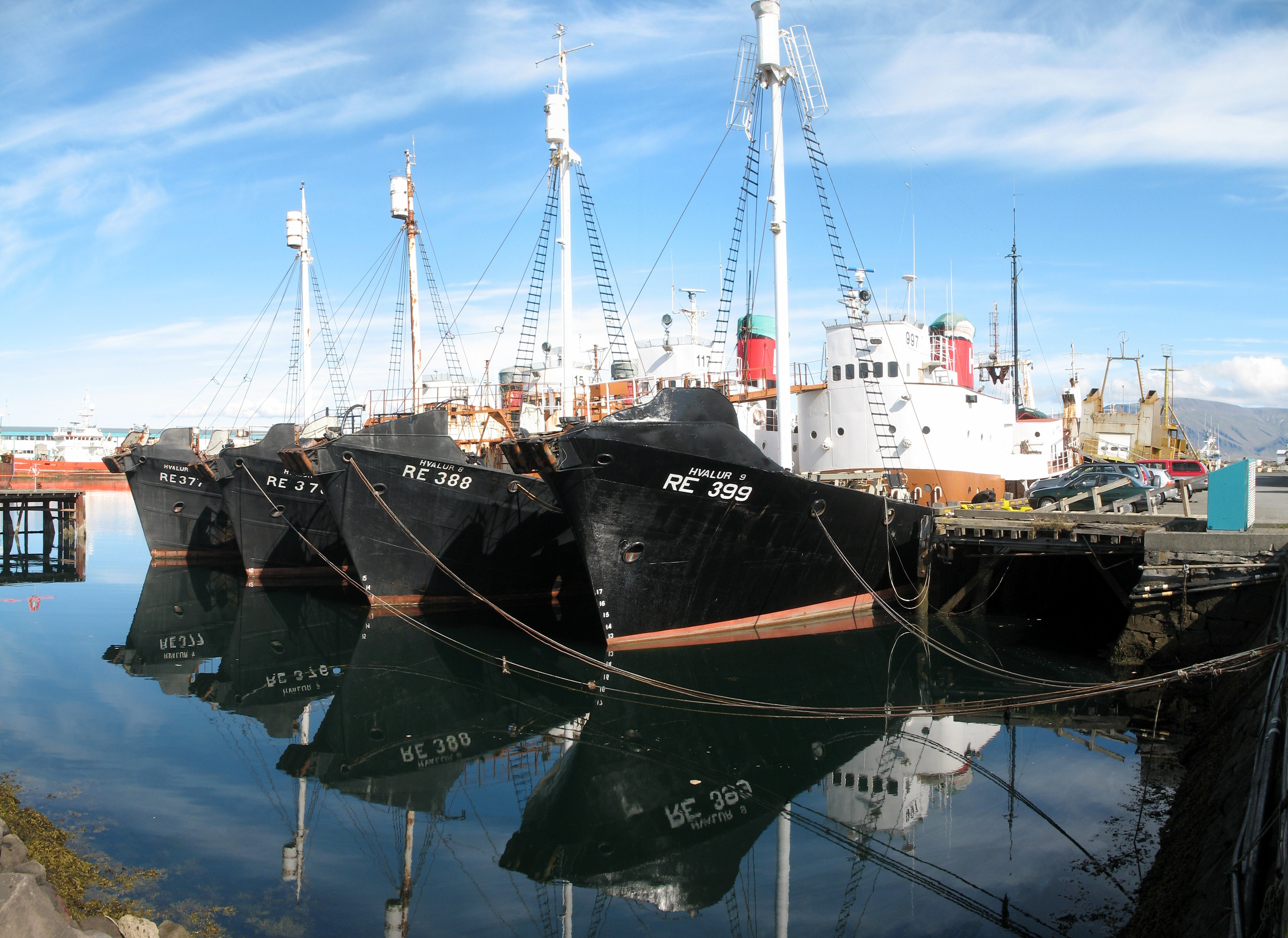
In fisheries, the most important sector of the Icelandic economy, Iceland has a €879 million trade surplus with the EU.

Economic relations between Iceland and the European Union are primarily governed by two agreements: a bilateral free trade agreement signed in 1972 and the agreement on the EEA signed in 1992. The EEA was established to give Iceland, among other European countries outside the EU, access to the EU market. Iceland's access to the EU market in respect of agriculture and fisheries is dealt with by separate bilateral agreements. Iceland is legally bound to implement into its own law all EU directives applicable to the free movement of goods, persons, services and capital. This is complemented by regular meetings between EU and Icelandic officials, including a twice-yearly meeting of EEA foreign ministers.

Icelandic-European trade
Direction of trade	Goods (2016)	Services (2016)	Investment (2016)
EU to Iceland	€2.9 billion	€1.4 billion	€8.5 billion
Iceland to EU	€3.6 billion	€1.2 billion	€-0.8 billion

78% of Iceland's exports went to the EU and 52% of Iceland's imports came from it, making the EU Iceland's most important trading partner, followed by Norway. Traditionally, Iceland's economy has focused on fisheries and renewable energy (primarily hydroelectricity and geothermal energy - see energy in Iceland for more details), but it has been diversifying into aluminium production, pharmaceuticals, information technologies, tourism and the financial sector. Iceland is still a large exporter of fish (the third largest exporter to the EU after Norway and China) with a world trade surplus of €1.1 billion in 2008. In fisheries, the EU had a 2009 trade deficit of €879 million. Until the 2008–2011 Icelandic financial crisis, its commercial services sector had been growing rapidly, accounting for almost 35% of total exports (goods and services combined).

== Potential accession of Iceland to the European Union ==
Process of potential accession of Iceland to the European Union
- Status: Application frozen
Application
Screened & negotiations commence
Negotiations
Chapters closed	11
Memberships & Treaties
Association Agreement
Economic and monetary policy
Travel
Energy
Foreign and military policy
Human rights and international courts
International Court of Justice (ICJ)
Impact (27+1)
Population	446,828,803
Area	4,233,262 km^{2} 1,634,472 mi^{2}
HDI	0.896
GDP (PPP)	$25.399 trillion
GDP per capita (PPP)	$56,928
GDP	$17.818 trillion
GDP per capita	$39,940
Gini	30.0
Official Languages	24	25; Icelandic ▲ +1

Iceland applied to join the European Union on 16 July 2009 and formal negotiations began on 27 July 2010. However, on 13 September 2013 the Government of Iceland dissolved its accession team and suspended its application to join the EU. On 12 March 2015, Foreign Minister of Iceland Gunnar Bragi Sveinsson stated that he had sent a letter to the EU withdrawing the application for membership, without the approval of the Althing, though the European Union stated that Iceland had not formally withdrawn the application.

If negotiations were to resume, Iceland would face controversial issues on fisheries which could potentially derail an agreement, despite already being a member of the European Economic Area, which excludes fishery. If an agreement were to be concluded, the accession treaty would be subject to a national referendum in Iceland and require ratification by every EU state.

=== Pre-2008 opinion ===
From 1995 to 2007 the government coalition of the conservative Independence Party (Sjálfstæðisflokkurinn) and the conservative Progressive Party (Framsóknarflokkurinn), opposed joining the EU, while the opposition Social Democratic Alliance (Samfylkingin) supported membership negotiations. In 1994, the Social Democratic Party (Alþýðuflokkurinn) became the first Icelandic political party to include the intention to apply to join the EU in its policy statement. Despite this hostility towards EU membership, the Independence Party was forced to accept some of the constraints associated with participation in the European project. Iceland sought shelter provided by the EEA, EFTA and Schengen because non-membership of the EEA and EFTA would have threatened its key economic interests, and non-membership of Schengen would have imposed burdens on Icelandic individuals.

Former Prime Minister Halldór Ásgrímsson predicted on 8 February 2006 that the country would join the EU by 2015. He added that the decisive factor would be the future and the size of the Eurozone, especially whether Denmark, Sweden and the UK would have adopted the euro or not. His prediction received some criticism, not the least from people within his own government.

Another former Prime Minister, Geir Haarde, has on a number of occasions stated his opposition to EU membership, both as Foreign Minister under Halldór Ásgrímsson and after taking office as Prime Minister. In response to Halldór Ásgrímsson's earlier prediction, Haarde said, "I don't share that point of view. Our policy is not to join in the foreseeable future. We are not even exploring membership." In a speech at a conference at the University of Iceland on 31 March 2006, Geir Haarde repeated what he had said on a number of occasions—that no special Icelandic interests demanded membership of the EU. In the same speech he further explained in detail why it would not be in the interest of Iceland to adopt the euro.

Following the 2007 election, the Independence Party and the Social Democratic Alliance formed a new coalition with a policy of not applying for membership, but setting up a special committee to monitor the development within the EU and suggest ways to respond to that.

Due to Iceland's limited currency, the government has explored the possibility of adopting the euro without joining the European Union. The EU, however, says that Iceland cannot join the Economic and Monetary Union (EMU) without becoming a full EU member state (all other non-EU states that use the euro do so because they previously used a member state currency that was replaced by the euro).

=== Effect of 2008 financial crisis ===
At a meeting of members of his party on 17 May 2008, Geir Haarde said that in his opinion the cost of joining the EU outweighed the benefits, and therefore he was not in favour of membership. However, in October 2008, during talks to repatriate a portion of Iceland's foreign invested pension funds—Iceland having been particularly affected by the 2008 financial crisis—the unions demanded that Iceland apply for EU membership in return for wage restraint.

On 30 October 2008, Þorgerður Katrín Gunnarsdóttir, minister of education, said that "Iceland has to define its long-term national interests and part of that is a revision of the currency regime, including a possible EU application" and that an application for membership needed to be discussed "in weeks rather than months".

Two weeks later, on 17 November 2008, the Independence Party announced it would hold its party congress in January 2009 instead of Autumn 2009, to reconsider the possibility of applying for EU membership; the Progressive Party also announced it would hold its party congress in January, after two anti-EU MPs (including the party leader) resigned and were replaced by MPs more positive towards EU application.

The Progressive Party accepted at its congress to support application for EU membership but with very strict conditions including one demanding full authority for Iceland over its fishing grounds and other national resources. When the government headed by the Independence Party was dissolved in January the party decided to postpone its congress until March. The congress eventually decided on an unchanged opposition to EU membership but also claimed that if the issue were opened by others both an application and an initial accession treaty with the EU should be put to a referendum.

The US denied Iceland's request for financial support after the 2008 economic crash. Iceland turned to the EU for assistance, but they also turned Iceland's request for aid down. This seriously damaged the efforts of the Europhiles in Iceland to sell the EU as a shelter provider to Iceland. The Europhiles mainly focused on the potential economic benefits of EU membership and the adoption of the euro, emphasizing the benefits of cheaper goods for consumers and enterprises, and access to aid from the EU structural funds for rural areas, agriculture and the tourism industry. There was, however, no mention of the EU as a soft security shelter provider. After a speedy economic recovery and considerable domestic opposition to membership, the application was put on hold in 2013. At present, the Icelandic government does not regard the country as a candidate to join the EU, though it has not withdrawn its membership application. Iceland's membership of the European Economic Area (EEA) and Schengen provide Iceland with partial political, economic and societal shelter but it is secondary to formal membership of the EU. Iceland's membership of the EU is unlikely to materialize in the present domestic and European environment. Domestic features of each country must be taken into consideration in order to fully understand its calculations of cost and benefits of a potential shelter relationship.

=== 2009 election and parliamentary debate ===
Iceland's finance minister, Steingrímur J. Sigfússon, ahead of the country's first elections since the financial crisis, stated that "any decision for Iceland to join the European Union and the single currency must be taken by its people, not one political party", on the subject that the issue of EU membership was the greatest threat to a stable coalition.

The 2009 election, which followed the financial crisis, saw the Progressive Party switch to supporting EU membership but the Independence Party called for a referendum prior to the start of negotiations. The Social Democratic Alliance made joining the EU a key issue in their campaign.

After the win of the pro-EU Social Democratic Alliance in the election, Prime Minister Jóhanna Sigurðardóttir spoke of an immediate application to the European Union and adoption of the euro within four years as a way to deal with the country's debt.

In late April 2009, it was announced that the United Kingdom, which at the time was a member state of the European Union with whom Iceland has had a long history of fishing and territorial water disputes, supported Iceland joining the EU.

In early May 2009, it was leaked that the issue of application for EU membership would likely be left to the parliament, in which the Alliance, the Progressive Party and the Citizens' Movement together already had enough seats to approve the application. Sigmundur Davíð Gunnlaugsson, the leader of the Progressive Party, strongly objected to the suggestion that his party would assist the government in this matter, however. The anti-EU Left-Green coalition partner accepted that in spring 2010, the minister for foreign affairs would present to the parliament a bill on talks with the EU.

On 10 May 2009, Prime Minister Jóhanna Sigurðardóttir announced that the government intended to move towards membership more quickly than previously expected. She announced that a bill would be introduced in parliament on 15 May 2009, authorising the opening of accession talks with the EU. She also stated that she was confident that the legislation would pass, and that she had secured a parliamentary majority on the issue, despite the official opposition to talks by one of her coalition partners. She went on to say that she expected an official application to be submitted no later than July 2009. This seemed to leave Iceland on course to join the EU along with Croatia in 2011, as predicted by EU Enlargement Commissioner, Olli Rehn. The government has stated that the issue will be put to a vote once an accession agreement has been negotiated.

The motion to file an application for membership was officially introduced in parliament on 25 May 2009. Voting was to have been held on 13 July, but was postponed until 16 July. First, a proposal by the Independence Party to hold a referendum on the membership application was defeated by 32 to 30 with one abstention. Then the Social Democratic Alliance's proposal to apply for membership immediately was approved with a narrow majority of 33 to 28 votes with 2 abstentions.

=== Application for membership ===
Countries that could join the European Union Current members Candidate countries Applicant / potential candidate countries Membership possible Membership not possible

To become a member, a country must first apply and then be recognised as a candidate country. For that to happen the country must satisfy the first of the Copenhagen criteria: it must be a politically stable democracy that respects human rights. Then negotiations will take place which will consider the country's fulfilment of economic criteria, the country's degree of adoption of EU legislation, and whether there shall be any exceptions.

EU Enlargement Commissioner Olli Rehn claimed that negotiations on an accession treaty would take less than a year, because Iceland had already adopted two-thirds of EU legislation in relation to the EEA. He had on other occasions claimed that the negotiations could take up to four years.

On 30 January 2009, Rehn commented that Iceland could enter the European Union promptly in 2011, at the same time as Croatia, saying that Iceland is an old democracy but also that it should not get special treatment. Fishing quotas and Icelandic whaling may be the toughest issues in any such negotiations.

On 16 July 2009, the Althing voted in favour of accession talks with the EU (with 33 votes in favour, 28 against, and 2 abstentions). The head of the parliamentary committee on EU affairs, Árni Þór Sigurðsson, stated that Iceland would not be ready to join the EU any earlier than 2013. However the government stated that it planned to complete negotiations by the end of 2010.

On 17 July 2009, the application for Icelandic membership of the EU was handed to the government of Sweden, which then held the presidency of the Council of the European Union, by the ambassador of Iceland in Stockholm. The application was again handed over by the Icelandic foreign minister to the Swedish one in a ceremony in Stockholm on 23 July 2009.

The letter of application was dated 16 July 2009. The application was acknowledged by the Council of the European Union on 27 July 2009.

=== Accession negotiations ===
Sweden, then holder of the EU presidency, announced that it would prioritise Iceland's EU accession process. On 24 July, the Lithuanian Parliament unanimously approved and gave full support for Iceland's membership application to join the European Union. Later, on 27 July, Malta also announced that it supports Iceland's EU bid.

In September 2009, the Spanish foreign minister visited Iceland to discuss the progress of the Icelandic application; Spain chaired the EU from January–June 2010. On 8 September, the EU commission sent a list of 2,500 questions to Iceland about its fulfilment of political and economic criteria and adoption of EU law. Iceland returned answers to them on 22 October 2009. On 2 November, Iceland selected a chief negotiator for the membership negotiations with the EU: Stefán Haukur Jóhannesson, Iceland's Ambassador to Belgium.

In January 2010 the Icesave dispute became an issue. The United Kingdom and the Netherlands wanted the Icelandic government to repay them the costs incurred in covering their citizens' losses due to the bankruptcy of some Icelandic banks. If Iceland did not pay, obstacles to membership could be laid by the UK and the Netherlands. If Iceland agreed to repay the UK and the Netherlands, the added debt would make it difficult to adopt the euro, a major reason for Iceland to join the EU, because of the convergence criteria. Spanish Foreign Minister Miguel Ángel Moratinos, who then held the Presidency of the European Union, has said that the Icesave dispute does not impact Iceland's application. David Miliband, then British Foreign Minister, reaffirmed the UK's continued support for Iceland's EU application. Additionally, the Dutch Foreign Minister Maxime Verhagen has stated that while the opening of negotiations will not be blocked by the Icesave dispute, it must be resolved before Iceland's accession.

In February 2010, the European Commissioner for Enlargement and European Neighbourhood Policy recommended to the Council of the European Union to start accession negotiations with Iceland. While it was expected that Iceland would be considered for official candidate status at the EU summit in March, this was delayed to allow the German national parliament, which has the authority to debate important EU policy such as enlargement before action is taken by the government, to consider the matter. The German Parliament voted in favour of opening membership negotiations on 22 April 2010. The European Council decided in June to begin negotiations, and on 17 June 2010, the EU granted official candidate status to Iceland by formally approving the opening of membership talks.

Negotiations for membership of the EU started on 27 July 2010, with screening of specific acquis chapters beginning on 15 November 2010. Iceland became eligible for pre-accession funding from the EU through the Instrument for Pre-Accession Assistance (IPA) since July 2010.

The first annual report on negotiations was published in November 2010: the main issues at stake remained the fisheries sector and whale hunting, while progress has been made concerning the Icesave dispute.

The screening process ended and formal negotiations began on 27 June 2011. Four chapters were opened: science and research; education and culture; public procurement; information society and media. The first two were immediately closed, a first in accession history. Iceland aimed to open half of the remaining chapters under the Polish presidency (the second half of 2011) and the other half under the following Danish presidency (first half of 2012). Despite disputes over Icesave and fishing, and the fact there was then no majority in favour of membership in Iceland, Icelandic Foreign Minister Össur Skarphéðinsson was confident Iceland would join and looked to the EU's flexibility in negotiations with Norway during the 1990s as hope. He did however claim that ultimately it was the major fishing countries of the EU who would influence the outcome of the application.

In February 2013, the Icelandic chief negotiator stated that the main driving force for Iceland joining the EU was the benefit to the country of adopting the euro to replace the inflation-plagued Icelandic króna. Iceland's HICP inflation and related long-term government interest rates were both recorded to be around 6 per cent on average for 2012. Most importantly, however, while the country retained the Icelandic kronur, it was unable to lift the capital controls recently introduced in the turmoil of the economic crisis. Introduction of the euro, a far stronger currency, would allow the country to lift these capital controls and achieve an increased inward flow of foreign economic capital, which ultimately would ensure higher and more stable economic growth. To be eligible to adopt the euro, Iceland would need to join the EU, as unilateral euro adoption had previously been refused by the EU.

=== 2013 election and withdrawal of application ===
The Icelandic Parliamentary committee on foreign affairs tabled a proposal on 18 December 2012 to suspend accession negotiations. The motion also called for an "application referendum" to be held to determine the will of the Icelandic people prior to any resumption of negotiations. A similar proposal was submitted to the Icelandic parliament in May 2012, but was rejected by a vote of 25 for and 34 against. The Icelandic parliament had yet to vote on the new proposal, which were supported primarily at the time by the opposition Independence Party and Progressive Party. The leaders of both governing parties, the Social Democratic Alliance and Left-Green Movement, stated that they did not support the motion. However, some MPs from the Left-Green Movement declared their support for the measure. On 10 January 2013, the proposal was formally adopted by the Foreign Affairs committee.

On 14 January, the Icelandic government announced that negotiations would be slowed, and that an accession agreement would not be reached before the parliamentary election in April. No new chapters would be opened prior to the election, though negotiations would continue on chapters that had already been opened. In February 2013, the national congress of both the Independence Party and Progressive Party reconfirmed their policy that further membership negotiations with the EU should be stopped and not resumed unless they are first approved by a national referendum, while the national congresses of the Social Democratic Alliance, Bright Future and Left-Green Movement reiterated their support for the completion of EU accession negotiations.

On 19 March 2013, Þorgerður Katrín Gunnarsdóttir, an Independence Party MP, put forward a motion in the Althing calling for a referendum asking the Icelandic public whether EU accession negotiations should continue. She proposed that the referendum be held during the upcoming parliamentary election in April if possible, or else during local elections in the spring of 2014. In response to Þorgerður Katrín and other proponents of EU integration within the Independence Party, Bjarni Benediktsson, the leader of the party, reiterated the party's policy of stopping negotiations with the EU, but promised to hold a referendum on continuing the negotiations in the first half of their term if they form government.

The ruling left-wing parties suffered a major defeat in the parliamentary elections that were held on 27 April 2013, while the centrist Progressive Party had a large victory. The leaders of the Progressive Party and the Independence Party began negotiating the formation of a coalition government, and on 22 May it was announced that a coalition platform had been agreed to that would suspend all accession talks with the EU and not resume them unless approved by a referendum. However, under Icelandic law, it is not the Government but the Icelandic Parliament which decides to end negotiations. On 13 June, Iceland's Foreign Minister Gunnar Bragi Sveinsson informed the European Commission that the newly elected government intended to "put negotiations on hold". European Commission President Manuel Barroso responded on 16 July 2013 by requesting that the new Icelandic Prime Minister make a decision on the continuation of their accession bid "without further delay", and stressed that the EU remained "committed to continue the accession negotiations process, which I'm certain could address Iceland's specificities".

In August 2013 the Icelandic government revealed that it had received a legal opinion that the 2009 Parliamentary vote did not oblige it to continue accession negotiations with the EU. In light of this, the Foreign Ministry stated that it had "decided to consider dissolving the negotiation committee". A few weeks later the committee was officially dissolved. Foreign Minister Gunnar Bragi Sveinsson said that "the process has been suspended. But nothing has been closed down." In October 2013 Bjarni stated that no decision on ending Iceland's membership bid would be made until a report being prepared by the government on negotiations and "the recent changes within the union" was completed, expected to be by the end of 2013. Bjarni went on to say that "we will see if a proposal will be put before the parliament or not." On 12 March 2015, Foreign Minister of Iceland Gunnar Bragi Sveinsson stated that he had sent a letter to the EU withdrawing the application for membership, without the approval of the Althing, though the European Union stated that Iceland had not formally withdrawn the application.

In 2017, Iceland's newly elected government announced that it would hold a vote in parliament on whether to hold a referendum on resuming EU membership negotiations. However, in November 2017 that government was replaced by a coalition of the Independence Party, the Left Green Movement and the Progressive Party; all of whom oppose membership. Only 11 out of 63 MPs are in favour of EU membership.

There was a renewed call in 2022 for a referendum on resuming EU membership negotiations in the wake of the Russian Invasion of Ukraine.

=== 2024 resurrection to 2026 referendum ===
After the 2024 election, the new Social Democratic Alliance-led government of Kristrún Frostadóttir decided to hold a referendum on resuming EU accession negotiations by 2027. Joining the EU is supported by one of their coalition partners, the Liberal Reform Party, while their other coalition partner, the People's Party, is staunchly opposed. The two groups within the coalition reached a compromise where the referendum will take place, but that it would be non-binding. Opinions polls showed that the public was broadly supportive of holding the referendum, but that it was divided on whether to eventually join the EU.

In January 2025, a spokesperson for the EU Commissioner for Enlargement stated that "Iceland's membership application is still valid; it was never formally withdrawn, so legally, it remains active."

Following United States President Donald Trump's repeated threats to annex Greenland by force, Iceland has seen a renewed drive to join the bloc, especially as the United States provides most of its defense capabilities through NATO. Shortly after Trump started pushing for annexing Greenland, European Commission President Ursula von der Leyen made a visit to Iceland in an effort to strengthen Iceland's European Economic Area partnership. Iceland's Foreign Minister, Þorgerður Katrín Gunnarsdóttir, announced that parliament will be presented with a resolution in the spring of 2026 on holding a referendum on resuming EU accession talks. If the parliament approves the resolution, Icelanders will head to the polls within nine months.

Following new tensions with the US due to new tariffs and the statement of the nominee for US ambassador to Reykjavik, Billy Long, who suggested that Iceland should become the 52nd US state, the government of Iceland decided to hold a referendum on restarting EU membership negotiations on 29 August 2026. Þorgerður Katrín stated that Iceland's negotiations could take 1.5 years. The government stated that if the public voted in favour of resuming negotiations, then any agreement ultimately reached with the EU to join would be subject to a second referendum.

On 29 August 2026 in the 2026 Icelandic European Union membership negotiations referendum, Iceland voted to reject the proposal to resume EU accession negotiations.

=== Timeline ===
EU affiliation ahead of membership application

- 1970-01-01: Iceland joins EFTA.
- 1992-05-02: Iceland signs EU Association Agreement (entering the EEA).
- 1994-01-01: EU Association Agreement entry into force.
- 2001-03-25: Iceland joins the Schengen Area.

EU membership application and the preparational phase

- 2009-07-17: Iceland submits EU membership application.
- 2009-09-08: European Commission presents legislative questionnaire to Iceland.
- 2009-10-22: Iceland responds to questionnaire.
- 2010-02-24: European Commission recommended that the Council open accession negotiations with Iceland.
- 2010-06-17: Iceland officially recognised as an accession candidate by the European Council.
- 2010-07-26: The Council approved the framework for accession negotiations with Iceland.
- 2010-07-27: Preparational phase of the membership negotiation process starts (Accession Conference nr.1).
- 2010-11-15: Screening process started.
- 2011-06-21: Screening process ended.

EU membership negotiations

- 2011-06-27: Accession Conference nr.2. Real negotiations started with the first four chapters being opened, of which two were completed and closed on the same day.
- 2011-10-19: Accession Conference nr.3. Two chapters were opened and closed immediately. In total 6 out of 33 chapters have now been opened (of which 4 have been closed).
- 2011-12-12: Accession Conference nr.4. Five chapters were opened, four were closed immediately. In total 11 out of 33 chapters have now been opened (of which 8 have been closed).
- 2012-03-30: Accession Conference nr.5. Four chapters were opened and two chapters were closed. In total 15 out of 33 chapters have now been opened (of which 10 have been closed).
- 2012-05-24: Proposal for a national referendum on discontinuing accession talks with the European Union rejected with 34 votes against and 25 in favour.
- 2012-06-22: Accession Conference nr.6. Three new chapters opened. In total 18 out of 33 chapters have now been opened (of which 10 have been closed).
- 2012-10-24: Accession Conference nr.7. Three new chapters opened. In total 21 out of 33 chapters have now been opened (of which 10 have been closed).
- 2012-12-18: Accession Conference nr.8. Six new chapters opened and one more chapter closed. In total 27 out of 33 chapters have now been opened (of which 11 have been closed).

=== Negotiation progress ===
Acquis chapter	EC assessment (2012)	Screening started	Screening completed	Chapter opened	Chapter closed
1. Free movement of goods	Generally already applies the acquis	2010-12-07	2010-12-08	2012-12-18	–
2. Freedom of movement for workers	Generally already applies the acquis	2011-02-09	2011-02-09	2011-10-19	2011-10-19
3. Right of establishment & freedom to provide services	Generally already applies the acquis	2010-12-09	2011-02-09	–	–
4. Free movement of capital	Some level of preparation	2010-12-10	2010-12-10	–	–
5. Public procurement	Generally already applies the acquis	2010-11-15	2010-11-15	2011-06-27	–
6. Company law	Generally already applies the acquis	2010-11-16	2010-11-16	2011-12-12	2011-12-12
7. Intellectual property law	Generally already applies the acquis	2010-12-20	2010-12-20	2011-10-19	2011-10-19
8. Competition policy	Generally already applies the acquis	2010-12-06	2010-12-06	2012-03-30	2012-12-18
9. Financial services	Generally already applies the acquis	2010-11-18	2010-12-15	2012-10-24	–
10. Information society & media	Generally already applies the acquis	2010-11-17	2010-11-17	2011-06-27	–
11. Agriculture & rural development	Early stage	2010-11-30	2011-01-27	–	–
12. Food safety, veterinary & phytosanitary policy	Moderately prepared	2011-02-14	2011-03-31	–	–
13. Fisheries	Some level of preparation	2010-12-16	2011-03-02	–	–
14. Transport policy	Good level of preparation	2011-05-04	2011-06-09	2012-06-22	–
15. Energy	Moderately prepared	2011-05-12	2011-06-20	2012-03-30	–
16. Taxation	Moderately prepared	2011-02-03	2011-03-04	2012-12-18	–
17. Economic & monetary policy	Generally already applies the acquis	2011-03-17	2011-05-17	2012-12-18	–
18. Statistics	Moderately prepared	2011-05-02	2011-06-07	2012-10-24	–
19. Social policy & employment	Generally already applies the acquis	2011-02-07	2011-03-16	2012-06-22	–
20. Enterprise & industrial policy	Generally already applies the acquis	2011-04-12	2011-05-25	2011-12-12	2011-12-12
21. Trans-European networks	Generally already applies the acquis	2011-05-06	2011-06-10	2011-12-12	2011-12-12
22. Regional policy & coordination of structural instruments	Good level of preparation	2011-01-31	2011-02-22	2012-12-18	–
23. Judiciary & fundamental rights	Generally already applies the acquis	2011-01-11	2011-02-11	2011-12-12	2011-12-12
24. Justice, freedom & security	Good level of preparation	2011-04-14	2011-05-24	–	–
25. Science & research	Generally already applies the acquis	2010-11-25	2011-01-14	2011-06-27	2011-06-27
26. Education & culture	Generally already applies the acquis	2010-11-26	2011-01-14	2011-06-27	2011-06-27
27. Environment	Good level of preparation	2010-11-22	2011-01-19	2012-12-18	–
28. Consumer & health protection	Generally already applies the acquis	2011-04-11	2011-05-16	2012-03-30	2012-03-30
29. Customs union	Good level of preparation	2011-03-08	2011-04-06	2012-10-24	–
30. External relations	Generally already applies the acquis	2011-04-08	2011-05-19	2012-12-18	–
31. Foreign, security & defence policy	Generally already applies the acquis	2011-04-07	2011-05-20	2012-03-30	2012-03-30
32. Financial control	Moderately prepared	2010-11-29	2011-02-02	2012-06-22	–
33. Financial & budgetary provisions	Good level of preparation	2011-03-07	2011-04-04	2011-12-12	–
34. Institutions	Nothing to adopt	–	–	–	–
35. Other issues	Nothing to adopt	–	–	–	–
Progress		33 out of 33	33 out of 33	27 out of 33	11 out of 33

- A document explaining the general process and each chapter
- Situation of policy area at the start of membership negotiations is according to the 2010 EC Opinion.
- Timetable for screening meetings 2010–2011

The screening is a series of meetings between the commission and the applicant country examining the level of fulfilment of the EU acquis. It allows candidate countries to familiarise themselves with the acquis and it allows the commission and the member States to evaluate the degree of preparedness of candidate countries prior to negotiations.

=== Political parties' stances ===
Party	Position	Main argument as stated on party websites and political compass
Bright Future	Yes	Supports the continuation of accession negotiations and a referendum on joining the EU.
Centre Party	No	"The center party believes Iceland's interests are better served outside the EU than within the customs union. In that light, the party does not see any reason to hold a referendum.[...]"
Independence Party	No	"The Independence Party puts forth the clear demand that the application for Iceland's membership of the European Union will be withdrawn without delay."
Left-Green Movement	No	"EU-membership would diminish the independence of Iceland even more than the EEA Agreement does and jeopardise Iceland's control over its resources."
People's Party	No	"We do not want to join the EU, but we are open to referendums."
Pirate Party Iceland	Neutral	The party concludes that it should not be up to politicians to decide whether Iceland joins the European Union but to the general population after transparent and informative accession talks.
Progressive Party	No	"The Progressive Party believes the interests of the country and the nation are best secured outside the EU."
Viðreisn	Yes	
Social Democratic Alliance	Yes	"We want to apply for an EU-membership and start negotiations. We will seek a national unity in this matter and use the national referendum as the highest court."

2009–2013
Group	Party	Position
Government	Social Democratic Alliance	Yes
Government	Left-Green Movement	No
Opposition	Independence Party	No
Opposition	Progressive Party	No
Opposition	The Movement	Neutral
No seats in the parliament	Citizens' Movement	Yes
No seats in the parliament	Liberal Party	No
No seats in the parliament	Best Party	Neutral

2013–2016
Group	Party	Position
Government	Progressive Party	No
Government	Independence Party	No
Opposition	Social Democratic Alliance	Yes
Opposition	Left-Green Movement	No
Opposition	Bright Future	Yes
Opposition	Pirate Party Iceland	Neutral
Opposition	Viðreisn	Yes

2016–2017
Group	Party	Position
Government	Independence Party	No
Government	Viðreisn	Yes
Government	Bright Future	Yes
Opposition	Left-Green Movement	No
Opposition	Pirate Party Iceland	Neutral
Opposition	Progressive Party	No
Opposition	Social Democratic Alliance	Yes

2017–2024
Group	Party	Position
Government	Independence Party	No
Government	Left-Green Movement	No
Government	Progressive Party	No
Opposition	Social Democratic Alliance	Yes
Opposition	Centre Party	No
Opposition	Pirate Party Iceland	Neutral
Opposition	People's Party	No
Opposition	Viðreisn	Yes

2024–
Group	Party	Position
Government	Social Democratic Alliance	Yes
Government	Viðreisn	Yes
Government	People's Party	No
Opposition	Independence Party	No
Opposition	Centre Party	No
Opposition	Progressive Party	No

== Public opinion ==
Results of polls on the topic if Iceland should join the EU

A poll released in January 2014 found that 67.5% of Icelanders support holding a referendum on the continuation of accession negotiations. On 22 February, the governing parties agreed to formally withdraw the membership application, without first holding a referendum on the matter, and submitted a bill to parliament seeking their approval to do so. The decision led to thousands of protesters taking to the streets outside of the Parliament buildings in Reykjavík. By 28 February 82% were in favour of holding the referendum. More than 40,000 people (16.5% of Iceland's voters) have signed a petition demanding that the promised referendum be held. On 25 February, Ragnheiður Ríkharðsdóttir, chairman of the parliamentary group of the Independence Party, announced her intention not to vote in favour of the proposal. In early March, the EU ambassador to Iceland said that the country could keep its application suspended rather than having to decide between resuming negotiations or formally withdrawing the application, "but of course not for an unlimited period of time". The bill was not approved before parliament's summer recess.

Various polls have been produced on the public opinion of starting accession negotiations, joining the EU or adopting the euro.

Date	Pollster	Question	Yes	No	Unsure
May 1999	DV	Start negotiations	57.1%	27.7%	15.2%
March 2002	Capacent-Gallup	Start negotiations	91%	5%	4%
March 2002	Capacent-Gallup	Join	57%	25%	23%
March 2002	Capacent-Gallup	Adopt Euro	66%	33%	12%
August 2005	Capacent-Gallup	Start negotiations	55%	37%	8%
August 2005	Capacent-Gallup	Join	43%	37%	20%
August 2005	Capacent-Gallup	Adopt Euro	37%	54%	9%
February 2006	Fréttablaðið	Join	34%	42%	24%
September 2007	Capacent-Gallup	Start negotiations	59%	26%	15%
September 2007	Capacent-Gallup	Join	48%	34%	18%
September 2007	Capacent-Gallup	Adopt Euro	53%	37%	10%
February 2008	Fréttablaðið	Join	55.1%	44.9%	–
February 2008	Fréttablaðið	More reasons than last year	54.7%	7.3%	38.1%
18 October 2008	Capacent Gallup	Referendum on application	70%	17.5%	12.5%
24 November 2008	Fréttablaðið	Submit application	60%	40%	–
January 2009	Capacent Gallup	Join	38%	38%	24%
26 January 2009	Fréttablaðið	Submit application	40%	60%	–
March 2009		Start negotiations	64%	28%	8%
11 April 2009	Fréttablaðið	Submit application	45.6%	54.4%	0%
5 May 2009	Capacent Gallup	Start negotiations	61%	27%	12%
5 May 2009	Capacent Gallup	Join	39%	39%	22%
10 June 2009	Capacent Gallup	Referendum on application	76.3%	17.8%	5.8%
30 July 2009	Fréttablaðið	Start negotiations	51%	36%	13%
4 August 2009	Capacent Gallup	Join	34.7%	48.5%	16.9%
15 September 2009	Capacent Gallup	Join	32.7%	50.2%	17%
15 September 2009	Capacent Gallup	If referendum now, how would you vote	38.5%	61.5%	0%
15 September 2009	Capacent Gallup	Happy with application?	39.6%	43.2%	17.1%
5 November 2009	Bifröst University Research Institute	Join	29.0%	54%	17%
5 November 2009	Bifröst University Research Institute	Start negotiations	50.5%	42.5%	7%
28 February 2010	Capacent Gallup	Join	33.3%	55.9%	10.8%
5 March 2010	Capacent Gallup	Join	24.4%	60%	15.5%
5 March 2010	Capacent Gallup	If referendum now, how would you vote	30.5%	69.4%	0%
14 June 2010	MMR	Maintain EU application	24.3%	57.6%	18.1%
6 July 2010	Capacent Gallup	Join	26%	60%	14%
2 September 2010	Capacent Gallup	Start negotiations	38.8%	45.5%	15.7%
29 September 2010	Fréttablaðið	Continue with negotiations	64.2%	32.8%	3%
24 January 2011	Fréttablaðið	Continue with negotiations	65.4%	34.6%	0%
10 March 2011	Capacent Gallup	Join	31.4%	50.5%	18%
10 March 2011	Capacent Gallup	If referendum now, how would you vote	38.9%	61.1%	0%
17 March 2011	MMR	Join	30%	55.7%	14.2%
16 June 2011	Capacent Gallup	Join	37.3%	50.1%	12.6%
30 June 2011	Capacent Gallup	Maintain EU application	38.5%	51.0%	10.5%
11 August 2011	Capacent Gallup	Join	35.5%	64.5%	0%
12 September 2011	Fréttablaðið	Continue with negotiations	63.4%	36.6%	0%
16 November 2011	MMR	Maintain EU application	35.3%	50.5%	14.2%
17 November 2011	Capacent Gallup	Continue with negotiations	53.1%	46.9%	0%
12 December 2011	Fréttablaðið	Continue with negotiations	65.3%	34.7%	0%
19 January 2012	Capacent Gallup	Join	31.5%	53.5%	15%
19 January 2012	MMR	Adopt Euro	28%	52%	20%
22 February 2012	Capacent Gallup	Join	26.3%	56.2%	17.5%
22 February 2012	Capacent Gallup	If referendum now, how would you vote	32.6%	67.4%	0%
22 February 2012	Capacent Gallup	Maintain EU application	42.6%	43.6%	13.9%
27 April 2012	University of Iceland	Join	27.5%	53.8%	18.7%
15 October 2012	Capacent Gallup	Join	27.3%	57.6%	15.0%
12 November 2012	Capacent Gallup	Maintain EU application	36.4%	53.5%	9.9%
18 January 2013	Fréttablaðið	Continue with negotiations	48.5%	36.4%	15%
13 February 2013	MMR	Join	24.2%	63.3%	12.5%
6 March 2013	Capacent Gallup	Join	25.1%	58.5%	16.5%
6 March 2013	Capacent Gallup	If referendum now, how would you vote	30%	70%	0%
6 March 2013	Capacent Gallup	Maintain EU application	43.5%	44.6%	11.9%
15 March 2013	Capacent Gallup	Continue and complete negotiations	54%	35%	11%
23 April 2013	University of Iceland	Join	27.6%	52.2%	20.2%
23 April 2013	University of Iceland	Continue with negotiations	52.7%	30.7%	16.5%
5 March 2014	Capacent Gallup	Join	37%	47%	16%
5 March 2014	Capacent Gallup	Hold referendum on resuming negotiations	72%	21%	7%
February 2016	Gallup	Join	40.9%	59.1%	
February 2016	Gallup	Resume negotiations	45.4%	40.3%	
September 2016	MMR	Join	28.2%	50.6%	
November 2016	MMR	Join	20.9%	57.8%	21.3%
February 2017	MMR	Join	25.9%	54%	20.1%
12–26 March 2019	Maskína	Join	31.6%	43.0%	25.4%
30 January–3 February 2020	Maskína	Join	31.4%	39.4%	29.3%
21 January–1 February 2021	Maskína	Join	30%	42%	29%
March 2022	Gallup	Join	47%	33%	20%
June 2022	Prósent	Join	48.5%	34.9%	16.7%
November 2022	Prósent	Join	42.8%	35.1%	22.1%
December 2022	Maskína	Hold referendum on resuming negotiations	47.9%	24.4%	27.5%
3–7 February 2023	Maskína	Join	40.8%	35.9%	23.3%
24–28 April 2023	Maskína	Hold referendum on resuming negotiations	59%	18%	23%
24–28 April 2023	Maskína	Join	44%	34%	22%
17–22 August 2023	Maskína	Hold referendum on resuming negotiations	57%	19%	24%
17–22 August 2023	Maskína	Join	40%	33%	27%
13–20 June 2024	Maskína	Join	42.4%	35.7%	21.9%
16–24 September 2024	Maskína	Join	45.3%	35.7%	16%
17–31 December 2024	Prósent	Hold referendum on resuming negotiations	58%	27%	15%
17–31 December 2024	Prósent	Adopt Euro	53%	27%	20%
17–31 December 2024	Prósent	Join	45%	35%	20%
3 January 2025	Maskína	Join	38%	42.7%	19.9%
3 January 2025	Maskína	Resume negotiations	50.9%	49.1%	0%
7–16 March 2025	Gallup Þjóðarpúls	Join	44%	36%	20%
27 March – 3 April 2025	Maskína	Join	36%	40%	24%
27 March – 3 April 2025	Maskína	Resume negotiations	45%	34%	22%
21 January – 2 February 2026	Gallup Þjóðarpúls	Join	42%	42%	16%
19 February – 4 March 2026	Gallup Þjóðarpúls	Hold referendum on resuming negotiations	57%	30%	12%
19 February – 4 March 2026	Gallup Þjóðarpúls	Resume negotiations	52%	48%	–
12–19 March 2026	Maskína	Join	31%	46%	23%
12–19 March 2026	Maskína	Resume negotiations	42%	39%	19%
19–31 March 2026	Gallup Þjóðarpúls	Join	40%	47%	13%
June 2026	Gallup Þjóðarpúls	Join	39%	46%	16%
2–11 June 2026	Maskína	Resume negotiations	45%	39%	16%
21-25 August 2026	Maskína	Resume negotiations	51	49%	_

== Comparison with EU countries ==
If Iceland were admitted to the EU, it would be the smallest member state in terms of population. Its area (103,000 km^{2}) is somewhat close to the average for EU countries (165,048 km^{2}), but it would be the least densely populated country in the EU. The table below shows its population and population density in comparison to some of the other member states.

Population figures			Population density		
EU rank	Country	Population	EU rank	Country	Density
	Iceland	329,100		Iceland	3.3
27	Malta	519,562	27	Finland	18.0
26	Luxembourg	690,947	26	Sweden	23.8
25	Cyprus	847,008	25	Estonia	30.3
14	Sweden (EU median)	9,747,355	14	Slovenia (EU median)	102.4
	(European Union) EU average	18,149,682		(European Union) EU average	117.5
2	France	66,415,161	2	Netherlands	500.7
1	Germany	83,157,201	1	Malta	1,352.4

Iceland's GDP per capita is among the highest in Europe as is shown in the following tables:

EU ranking	Country	GDP per capita (nominal)
1	Luxembourg	$146,818
2	(Republic of Ireland) Ireland	$129,132
	Iceland	$98,150
3	Denmark	$76,581
4	Netherlands	$73,174
5	Austria	$61,694
	(European Union) EU average	$46,804
27	Bulgaria	$20,426

The Icelandic language would be one of the official languages of the EU with the least speakers in terms of native speakers (together with Irish and Maltese).

Comparison to the EU and impact of joining
Member countries	Population	Area (km^{2})	GDP (billions, nominal)	GDP per capita (nominal)	Languages
Iceland	321,857	103,001	$35.380	$98,150	Icelandic
EU27	446,824,564	4,138,881			24
EU27+1	447,146,421 (+0.07%)	4,241,882 (+2.48%)			25

== Iceland's foreign relations with EU member states ==
- Austria
- Belgium
- Bulgaria
- Croatia
- Cyprus
- Czech Republic
- Denmark
- Estonia
- Finland
- France
- Germany
- Greece
- Hungary
- (Republic of Ireland) Ireland
- Italy
- Latvia
- Lithuania
- Luxembourg
- Malta
- Netherlands
- Poland
- Portugal
- Romania
- Slovakia
- Slovenia
- Spain
- Sweden

== Diplomatic relations between Iceland and EU member states ==
Country	Icelandic embassy	Reciprocal embassy	Notes
Austria		Copenhagen, Denmark	Icelandic Permanent Mission to CTBTO, IAEA and OSCE
Belgium	Brussels	Oslo, Norway	Icelandic Mission to the EU and Permanent Delegation to NATO in Brussels
Denmark	Copenhagen; Consulates General: Tórshavn, Nuuk	Reykjavík	
Finland	Helsinki	Reykjavík	
France	Paris	Reykjavík	Icelandic Mission to OECD, UNESCO and Council of Europe
Germany	Berlin	Reykjavík	
Italy	Paris, France	Oslo	Icelandic Permanent Mission to FAO, IFAD and WFP
Poland	Warsaw	Reykjavík	Icelandic Embassy was opened in Warsaw in 2022
Spain	Paris, France	Oslo	
Sweden	Stockholm	Reykjavík	

== See also ==
- Foreign relations of the European Union
- Foreign relations of Iceland
- Icelandic European Union membership referendum
- Greenland–European Union relations
- Liechtenstein–European Union relations
- Norway–European Union relations
- Faroe Islands and the European Union
- United Kingdom–European Union relations
- Arctic policy of the European Union
- Potential enlargement of the European Union
- European Union–NATO relations
