= France–Iceland relations =

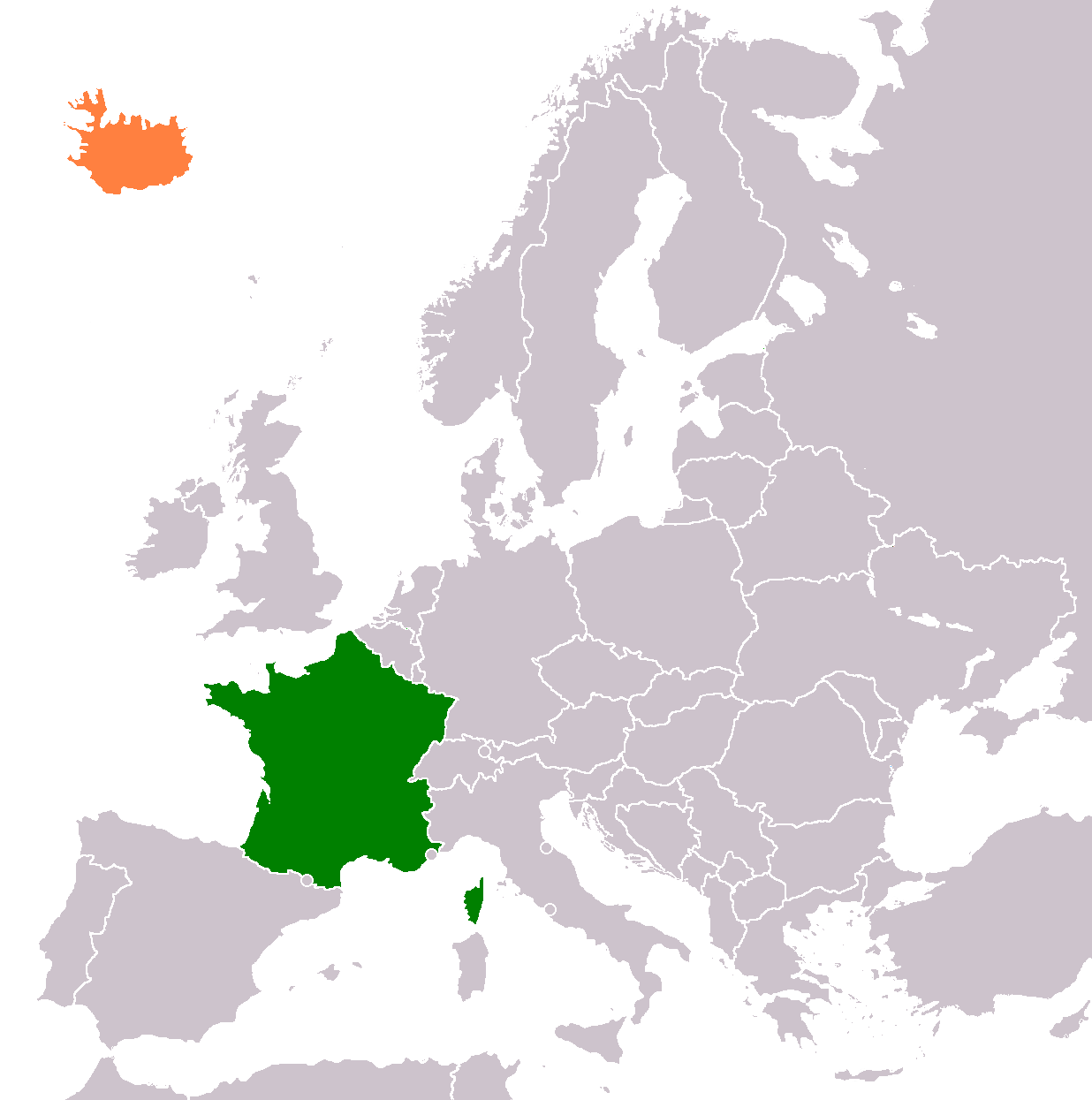
- France: Iceland

Iceland and France have maintained diplomatic relations between them since 10 January 1946. Both nations are members of the European Economic Area, North Atlantic Treaty Organization, the Organisation for Economic Co-operation and Development and the United Nations.

== History ==
French seamen started fishing in the seas nearby Iceland in the 18th century. In the 1900s the French organization Société des hopitaux francais d´Islande built three hospitals in Iceland, one in Reykjavík, one in the Vestmann Islands and one in Fáskrúðsfjörður, East-Iceland. Of those three hospitals, the hospital in Fáskrúðsfjörður was rebuilt in 2009–2014. In 1955 a cemetery was built in Fáskrúðsfjörður for 49 French seamen.

== Trade and investment ==
In 2014, Iceland directly exported goods worth 12.7 billion ISK to France, making them the seventh export destination of Iceland.

== Resident diplomatic missions ==
- France has an embassy in Reykjavík.
- Iceland has an embassy in Paris.
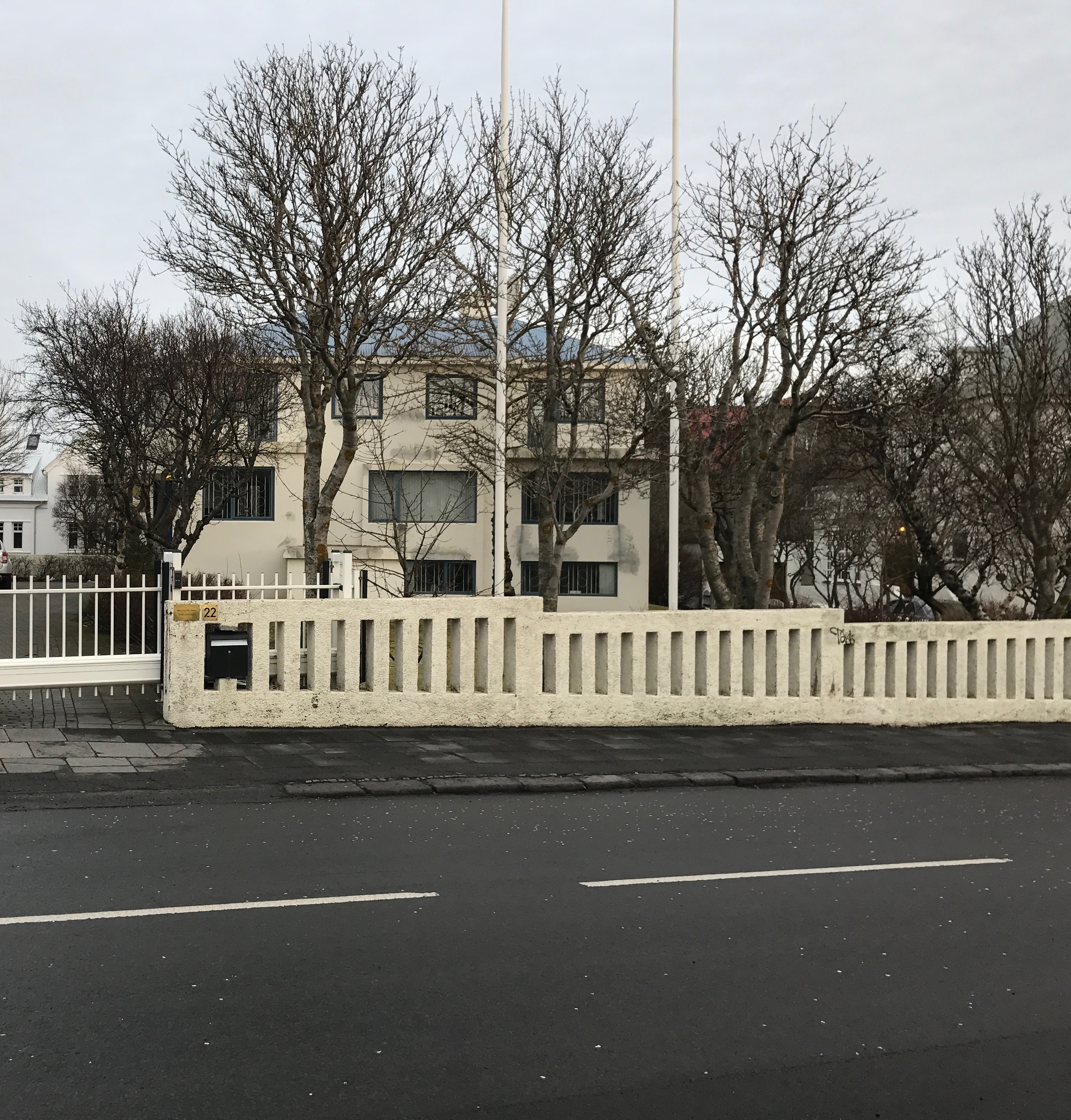
Embassy of France in Reykjavík

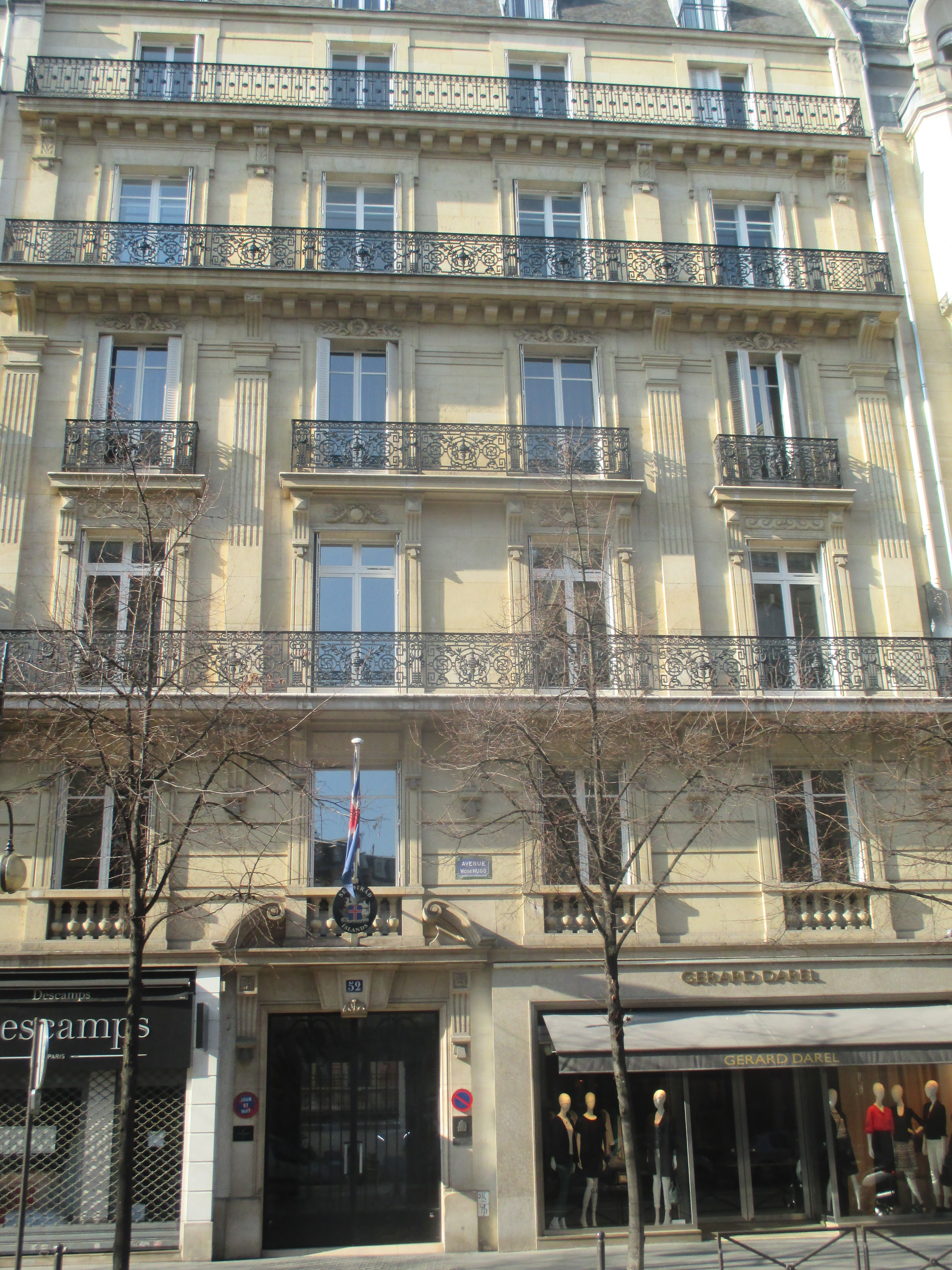
Embassy of Iceland in Paris

== See also ==
- Foreign relations of France
- Foreign relations of Iceland
- Iceland-EU relations
- NATO-EU relations
- Ambassador of Iceland to France
