= Sverrir Haukur Gunnlaugsson =

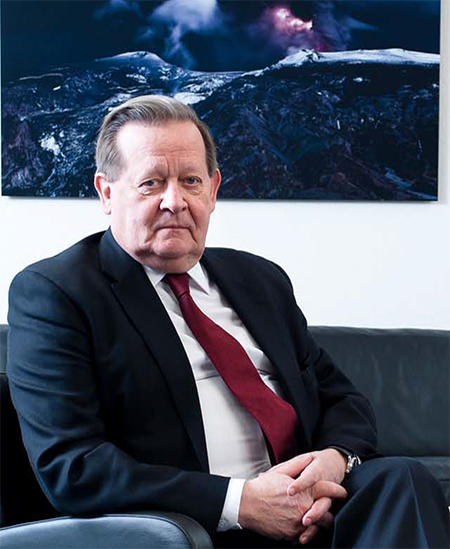

Vice-President, College Member, EFTA Surveillance Authority (ESA)
- In office 2010–2013

Ambassador of Iceland to United Kingdom
- In office 2003–2009

Permanent Secretary of State of the Ministry of Foreign Affairs Iceland
- In office 1999–2002

Ambassador of Iceland to France
- In office 1994–1999

Permanent Representative of Iceland to NATO in Brussels
- In office 1990–1994

Permanent Representative of Iceland to EFTA in Geneva
- In office 1987–1989

Personal details
- Born: 20 October 1942 (age 83) Copenhagen, Denmark

Sverrir Haukur Gunnlaugsson (born 20 October 1942 in Copenhagen, Denmark) is an Icelandic lawyer and diplomat, who served as Permanent Secretary of State at the Ministry for Foreign Affairs 1999-2002 and as Ambassador i.a. to France 1994-1999 and to the United Kingdom 2003–2009. He was the Permanent Representative of Iceland to EFTA in Geneva 1987-1989 and to NATO in Brussels 1990–1994.

During his tenure as Ambassador he also served as Permanent Representative to the OECD, UNESCO, FAO and the Council of Europe. His side accreditations as Ambassador included Italy, Spain, Portugal, Greece, the Netherlands, Ireland, Malta, Andorra, India, Egypt, Nigeria, Lebanon and Jordan.

Sverrir's contribution in the field of defense was serving as Chairman of the Icelandic Defense Committee 1983-1987 and in subsequent roles at NATO and the Foreign Ministry. He took in 1989 part in the pre-negotiations of Iceland's membership to the EEA Agreement as a High-Level Official.

He was appointed for four years 2010 to 2013 as College Member and Vice-President of the EFTA Surveillance Authority in Brussels following his retirement from the foreign service.

During his career, Sverrir has sat on numerous boards and committees including as board member of the Law of the Sea Institute of Iceland from 1999 to 2009 where he served as Chairman 2002 to 2005. He was Chairman of the Building Committee of the Leifur Eiríksson International Terminal which was inaugurated in April 1987.

Since 1999, Sverrir is an examiner of International law and guest lecturer on the EEA Agreement at the University of Iceland. In 2016 Sverrir established a course on Diplomacy and Foreign Affairs at Reykjavík University.
