= Iceland–Poland relations =

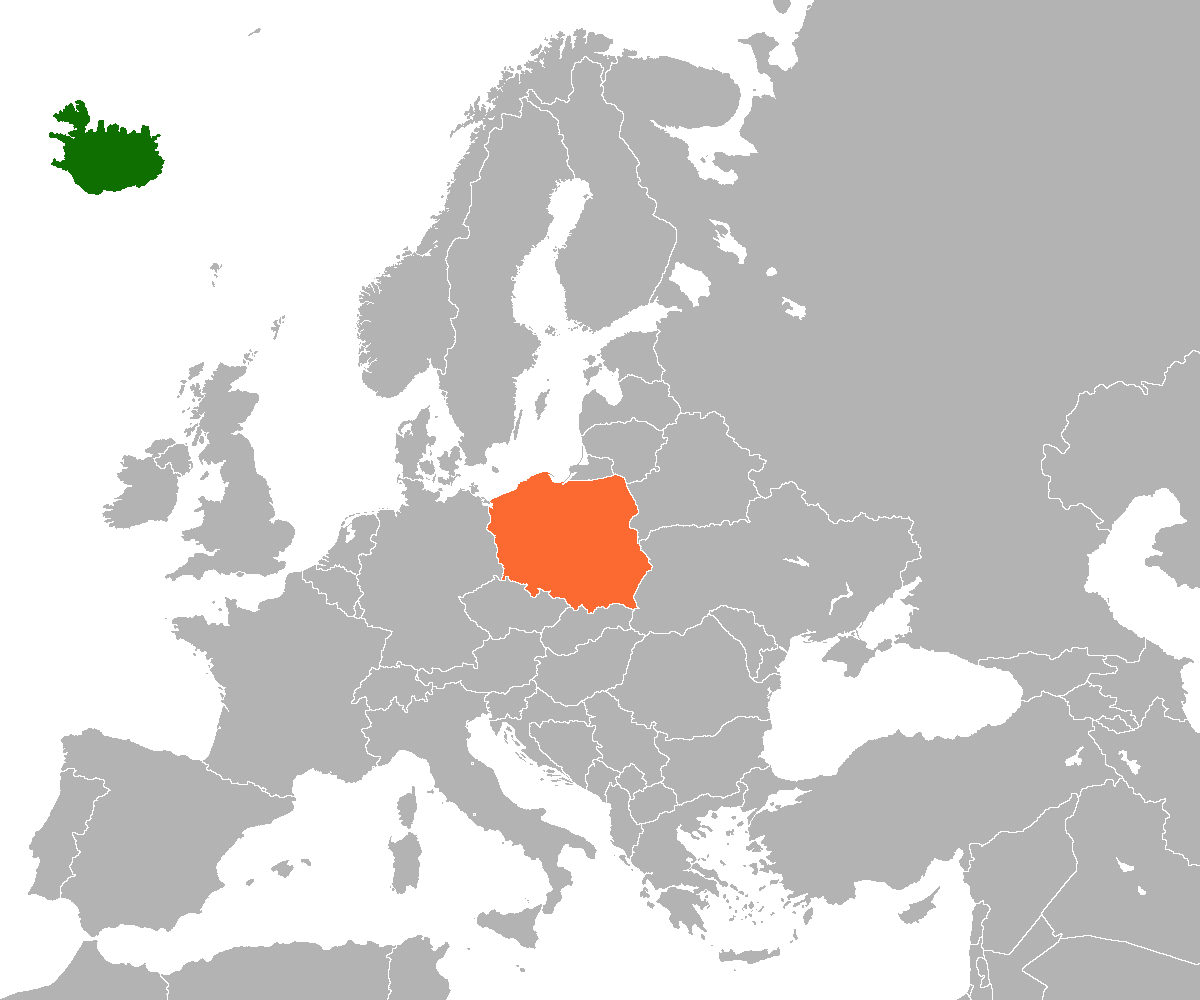
- Iceland: Poland

Iceland–Poland relations are the bilateral relations between Iceland and Poland. Both nations are members of the European Economic Area, North Atlantic Treaty Organization, Organisation for Economic Co-operation and Development, Organization for Security and Co-operation in Europe, Council of the Baltic Sea States, Council of Europe and the United Nations.

== History ==
From 1389 to 1442, Eric of Pomerania of the House of Griffin was the ruler of Iceland as King of Norway Eric III (from 1397 to 1442 as part of the Kalmar Union), and his tomb is located in his birth town of Darłowo in Poland.

The first known contact between Iceland and Poland began in 1613 when Czech pastor Daniel Strejc-Vetterus visited Iceland and spent a considerable amount of time on the island. In 1638, he published a book in Polish titled Islandia, álbo Krotkie opisanie Wyspy Islandiy (Iceland, or A Brief Description of the Island of Iceland)(published in Leszno, Poland) about his travels in the country. In the 19th century, Polish writer Edmund Chojecki arrived to Iceland as a secretary to future French Emperor Napoleon III. In 1857, Chojecki published a book in French titled Voyage dans les mers du nord à bord de la corvette la Reine Hortense describing his travels and experience in Iceland.

In 1924, Iceland and Poland signed a Treaty of Commerce and Navigation. Before the end of World War II, Iceland recognized the Polish Provisional Government of National Unity in July 1945. Diplomatic relations between the two nations were officially established in January 1946. In 1956, Poland opened a consulate in Reykjavík which stayed open until 1981.

In 2008, Poland re-opened a consulate-general in Reykjavík. The Polish consulate was later upgraded to an embassy.

== Military cooperation ==
The Polish Air Force takes part in the NATO Icelandic Air Policing mission to guard the airspace over Iceland.

== State visits ==
In 1999, Icelandic President Ólafur Ragnar Grímsson paid an official visit to Poland becoming the first Icelandic head of state to visit the country. In May 2000, Polish President Aleksander Kwaśniewski reciprocated the visit to Iceland. In March 2020, President of the Republic of Iceland Guðni Thorlacius Jóhannesson paid an official visit to Poland with his wife.

== Transport ==
There are direct flights between Iceland and Poland which is served by Icelandair.

== Migration ==
In the 1960s, Polish migrants began arriving to Iceland to work in the shipyards throughout the country. In need of labor, Iceland began recruiting Polish workers in the 1980s to the island nation. In the mid-2000s, the Polish community was well over 20,000 members. After the 2008–2011 Icelandic financial crisis, the Polish community decreased by half, however, Polish nationals today account for 3% of the total population on the island and Polish residents constitute the largest foreign community in Iceland.

== Trade ==
Both Iceland and Poland trade under the European Single Market with Iceland belonging to the European Free Trade Association and Poland being a full member of the European Union.

== Resident diplomatic missions ==
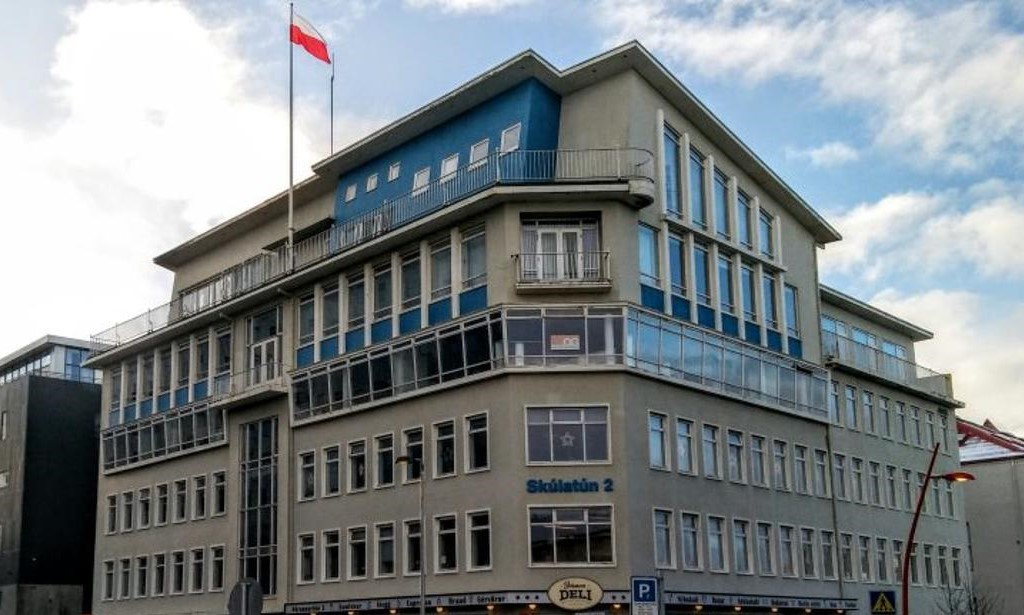
Embassy of Poland in Reykjavík

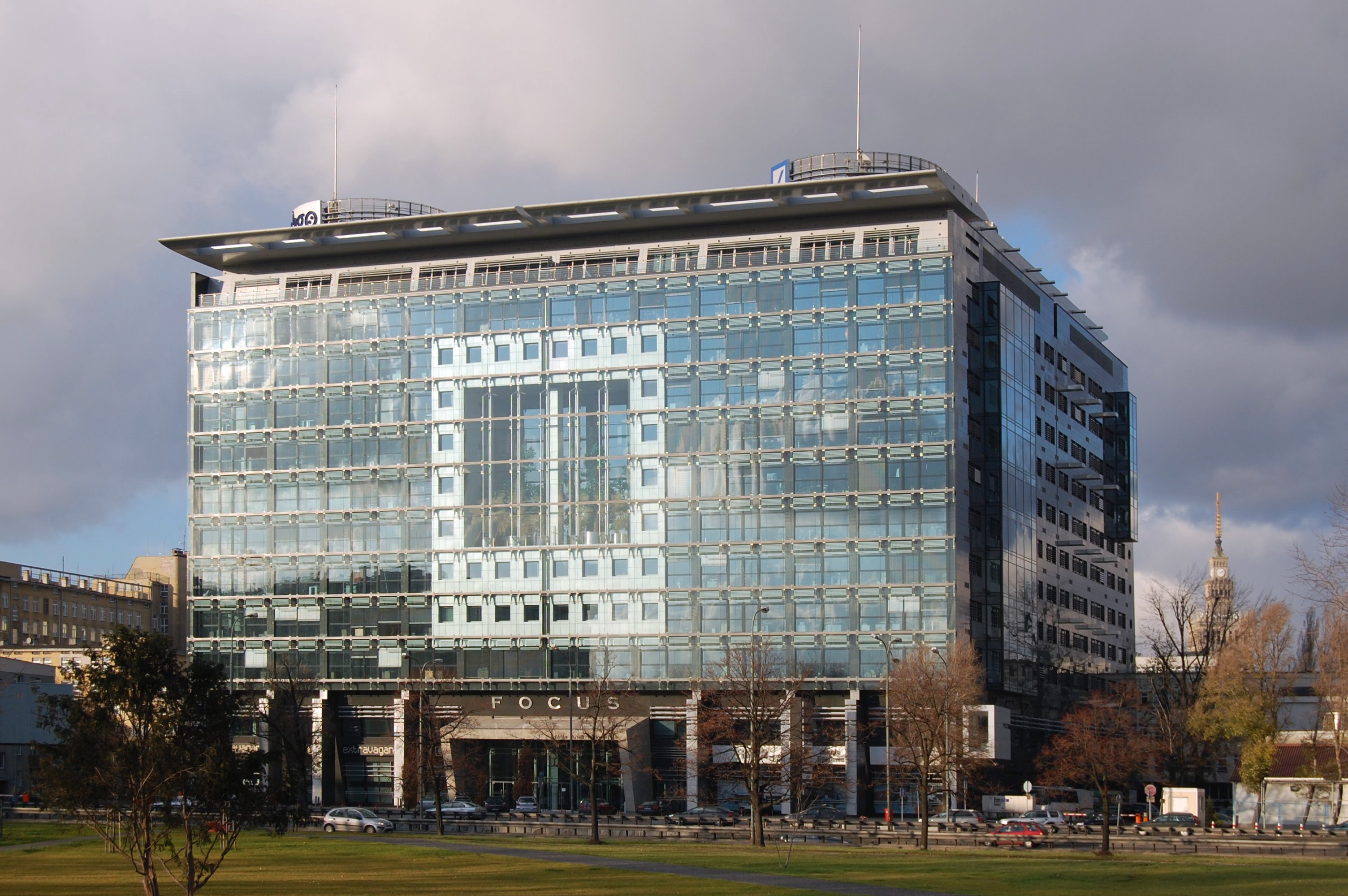
Embassy of Iceland in Warsaw

- Iceland has an embassy in Warsaw.
- Poland has an embassy in Reykjavík.

== See also ==
- Foreign relations of Iceland
- Foreign relations of Poland
- Iceland-EU relations
- NATO-EU relations
- Poles in Iceland
- Prince Polo, a Polish chocolate bar popular in Iceland
