= Iceland–Luxembourg relations =

- Iceland: Luxembourg

Iceland–Luxembourg relations are the bilateral relations between Iceland and the Grand Duchy of Luxembourg. Both countries are full members of the Organisation for Economic Co-operation and Development and NATO. The two countries established diplomatic relations on 30 July 1962.

== Diplomatic missions ==
Iceland maintains its representation to Luxembourg through its embassy in Brussels, which is accredited to the country.

== High level visits ==
=== High-level visits from Iceland to Luxembourg ===
In February 1971, Icelandic prime minister Jóhann Hafstein and foreign minister Emil Jónsson had a three day state visit in Luxembourg. They met, amongst others, prime minister Pierre Werner and Jean, Grand Duke of Luxembourg, and later layed a wreath at the memorial to the victims of the Nazis.

In July 1994, Icelandic prime minister Davíð Oddsson visited Luxembourg where he met with prime minister Jacques Santer.

In February 2008, Icelandic prime minister Geir Haarde visited Luxembourg, meeting with prime minister Jean-Claude Juncker, with whom he discussed the possibility of Iceland joining the European Union.

On September 6, 2023 the Icelandic Prime Minister Katrín Jakobsdóttir visited Luxembourg. She met Prime Minister Xavier Bettel to discuss ways of strengthening ties further. On that same day Xavier Bettel said on social media that the two countries "share the goal of wanting to build a stronger, greener, fairer and more prosperous Europe."

=== High-level visits from Luxembourg to Iceland ===
Luxembourg prime minister Pierre Werner made a state visit to Iceland in September 1969 where he met with Icelandic prime minister Bjarni Benediktsson.

== See also ==
- Foreign relations of Iceland
- Foreign relations of Luxembourg
- Iceland-EU relations
