= Poles in Iceland =

Total population
- 20,553 (born in Poland)

Languages
- Polish language · English language · Icelandic language

Religion
- Roman Catholicism

Poles make up the largest group of immigrants in Iceland. On 1 January 2021, Statistics Iceland recorded 20,553 Polish-born people living in Iceland. Although small compared to the size of migrant groups in other countries, that makes them the biggest minority ethnic group in Iceland.

== History ==
There have been several different migratory movements of Poles to Iceland. The first major migration occurred at the turn of the 19th century after Poland lost its statehood. However, for much of the Cold War period, most of the Polish population was restricted in their ability to travel outside of Polish People's Republic at all due to the Iron Curtain.

More recently in 2004, an influx occurred after Poland joined the European Union, thereby easing restrictions on Polish citizens' eligibility to work in other European Economic Area states. In 2006, Iceland's construction industry boomed and Polish workers were increasingly hired to fulfill work demands. Within a year, the number of Polish migrants in the country increased by 81%. Poland also joined Iceland in the Schengen Zone in 2007. As a result, Poles do not need work or resident permits to live and work in Iceland. The 2008 financial crisis decreased the levels of migration drastically and more Poles repatriated than arrived in Iceland during this year.

== Life in Iceland ==
The demographic is largely endogamous and insular. Poles in Iceland typically speak Polish, watch Polish television, continue to practice Catholicism and have opened Polish restaurants.

The Icelandic public broadcaster RÚV maintains a news web page and podcast in Polish. The page was started in 2020 during the COVID-19 pandemic.

A study conducted in 2012 suggested that most Polish Icelanders used the English language more often than Icelandic in their daily lives, found English more useful and often learned it before learning Icelandic.

== Politics ==
Poles living in Iceland can cast their vote in Polish elections. During the Polish presidential election in 2020 roughly 80% of Poles in Iceland voted for Rafał Trzaskowski (candidate of the Civic Platform) while only 20% voted for Andrzej Duda (candidate of the Law and Justice party). This contrasts with Poland where Andrzej Duda won the majority.

== See also ==
- Demographics of Iceland
- Iceland–Poland relations
- Poles in Denmark
- Poles in Finland
- Poles in Norway
- Poles in Sweden
