= List of ambassadors of Russia to Iceland =

Ambassador of the Russian Federation to Iceland
- Emblem of the Russian Foreign Ministry
- Ministry of Foreign Affairs; Embassy of Russia in Reykjavík
- Style: His Excellency; The Honourable
- Reports to: Minister of Foreign Affairs
- Seat: Reykjavík
- Appointer: President of Russia
- Term length: At the pleasure of the president
- Website: Embassy of Russia in Iceland

The ambassador of Russia to Iceland is the official representative of the president and the government of the Russian Federation to the president and the government of Iceland.

The representative and his staff work at large in the Russian embassy in Reykjavík. The post of Russian ambassador to Iceland is currently vacant, following the withdrawal of the last ambassador, Mikhail Noskov, on 11 September 2023. Since then, representation has been by chargé d'affaires.

== History of diplomatic relations ==
Formal diplomatic relations between the Kingdom of Iceland and the Soviet Union date back to 1926. Iceland at this time was part of a personal union with the Kingdom of Denmark, and affairs were handled through the representatives in Denmark. A representative office was opened in Reykjavík in 1943, with 4 October 1943 being considered the official date of the establishment of diplomatic relations. The first representative, Aleksey Krasilnikov, was appointed on 9 December 1943. The personal union between Denmark and Iceland was dissolved after the 1944 Icelandic constitutional referendum, and the Soviet Union became one of the first states to recognize Icelandic independence. The mission was upgraded to an embassy in November 1955, and the exchange of ambassadors continued throughout the rest of the existence of the Soviet Union. With the dissolution of the Soviet Union in 1991, the incumbent Soviet ambassador, Igor Krasavin, continued in post as the Russian ambassador until 1992.

Diplomatic relations were reviewed by the Icelandic government following the Russian invasion of Ukraine in 2022. On 9 June 2023, they decided to close the embassy in Moscow and withdraw their ambassador to Russia. Russian diplomatic representation in Iceland was simultaneously downgraded to chargé d'affaires.

== List of representatives of Russia to Iceland (1943–present) ==
=== Soviet Union to Iceland (1943–1991) ===
Name	Title	Appointment	Termination	Notes
Aleksey Krasilnikov	Envoy	9 December 1943	8 May 1946	Credentials presented on 19 March 1944
Vasily Rybakov	Envoy	8 May 1946	24 September 1948	Credentials presented on 30 October 1946
Ivan Korchagin	Chargé d'affaires	24 September 1948		
Pavel Yermoshin	Envoy before 31 December 1955; Ambassador after 31 December 1955	27 January 1954	18 September 1958	Credentials presented on 11 May 1954 (as envoy); Credentials presented on 29 February 1956 (as ambassador)
Aleksandr Aleksandrov	Ambassador	18 September 1958	27 December 1963	Credentials presented on 14 October 1958
Nikolai Tupitsyn	Ambassador	27 December 1963	29 August 1966	Credentials presented on 12 February 1964
Nikolai Vazhnov	Ambassador	29 August 1966	4 July 1970	Credentials presented on 28 October 1966
Sergey Astavin	Ambassador	4 July 1970	21 June 1973	Credentials presented on 14 September 1970
Yury Kirichenko	Ambassador	21 June 1973	14 March 1975	Credentials presented on 23 August 1973
Georgy Farafonov	Ambassador	14 March 1975	16 July 1979	Credentials presented on 25 March 1975
Mikhail Streltsov	Ambassador	16 July 1979	12 July 1984	Credentials presented on 2 August 1979
Yevgeny Kosarev	Ambassador	12 July 1984	24 November 1986	Credentials presented on 2 October 1984
Igor Krasavin	Ambassador	24 November 1986	25 December 1991	

=== Russian Federation to Iceland (1991–present) ===
Name	Title	Appointment	Termination	Notes
Igor Krasavin	Ambassador	25 December 1991	2 March 1992	
Yury Reshetov	Ambassador	18 March 1992	2 April 1998	
Anatoly Zaytsev	Ambassador	2 April 1998	28 February 2002	
Aleksandr Rannikh	Ambassador	28 February 2002	15 December 2005	
Viktor Tatarintsev	Ambassador	17 April 2006	18 January 2010	
Andrey Tsyganov	Ambassador	18 January 2010	6 March 2014	
Anton Vasilyev	Ambassador	6 March 2014	11 November 2020	Credentials presented on 12 May 2014
Mikhail Noskov	Ambassador	11 November 2020	11 September 2023	Credentials presented on 30 December 2020
Sergey Andriashin	Chargé d'affaires	11 September 2023		
