= XL Airways =

XL Airways may refer to:

- XL Airways France, which closed in 2019, formerly Star Airlines
- XL Airways Germany, which closed in 2013
- XL Airways UK, which closed in 2008 following XL Leisure Group's insolvency
