= List of airline codes (X) =

This is a list of all airline codes. The table lists the IATA airline designators, the ICAO airline designators and the airline call signs (telephony designator). Historical assignments are also included for completeness.

== Codes ==
Airline codes
IATA	ICAO	Airline	Call sign	Country	Comments
	XJE	X-Jet		Austria	
	XAB	Xabre Aerolineas	AERO XABRE	Mexico	
	XAE	Xair	AURA	Czech Republic	
	XJC	XJC Limited	EXCLUSIVE JET	United Kingdom	
	XER	Xerox Corporation	XEROX	United States	
7A	XRC	Express Air Cargo	TUNISIA CARGO	Tunisia	
MF	CXA	Xiamen Airlines	XIAMEN AIR	China	
	CXJ	Xinjiang Airlines	XINJIANG	China	
	XJT	Xjet Limited	XRAY	United Kingdom	
SE	SEU	XL Airways France	STARWAY	France	
	GXL	XL Airways Germany	STARDUST	Germany	
	XOJ	XOJet	EXOJET	United States	
	XPS	XP International	XP PARCEL	Netherlands	
		Xpedite	BIGSPLASH	United Kingdom	
XN	XAR	XpressAir	XPRESS	Indonesia	Renamed from Travel Express Aviation Services in 2012
	RAG	Xstrata Nickel (Raglan Mine)	RAGLAN	Canada	

^{*} on IATA code indicates a controlled duplicate.
italics indicates a defunct airline.

== IATA Traffic Conference Areas ==
The International Air Transport Association (IATA) divides the world into three areas called the Traffic Conference Areas (TCAs) for air travel purposes. These areas are used to define geographical boundaries for fare construction and other industry-related practices:

- Traffic Conference Area 1 (TC1) – this area includes the Americas, encompassing North America (the Caribbean, Central America, and Northern America) and South America.
- Traffic Conference Area 2 (TC2) – this area includes the EMEA region, encompassing Europe, the Middle East, and Africa (North Africa and Sub-Saharan Africa).
- Traffic Conference Area 3 (TC3) – this area includes the Asia–Pacific region, encompassing the rest of Asia (Central Asia, East Asia, North Asia, South Asia, and Southeast Asia) and Oceania.

Essentially, TC1 covers the "New World", while TC2 and TC3 together cover the "Old World" (Africa-Eurasia) and the "Land Down Under".

== See also ==
- IATA airport code
- ICAO airport code
