= Star XL =

Star XL may refer to one of the following:

- XL Airways Germany, sometimes known as Star XL German Airways
- Weather Star XL, an IRIX computer built for The Weather Channel
