= Canet Roussillon =

Canet Roussillon may refer to:

- Canet-en-Roussillon, commune in Occitanie, France
- Canet Roussillon FC, association football club in Canet-en-Roussillon, Occitanie, France
