= Perpignan–Rivesaltes Airport =

Airport in Southern France

Perpignan-Rivesaltes Airport Aéroport de Perpignan-Rivesaltes
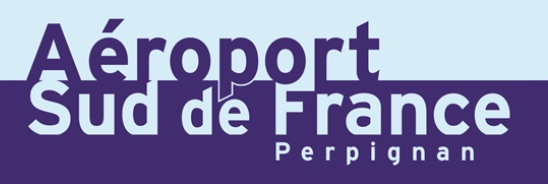

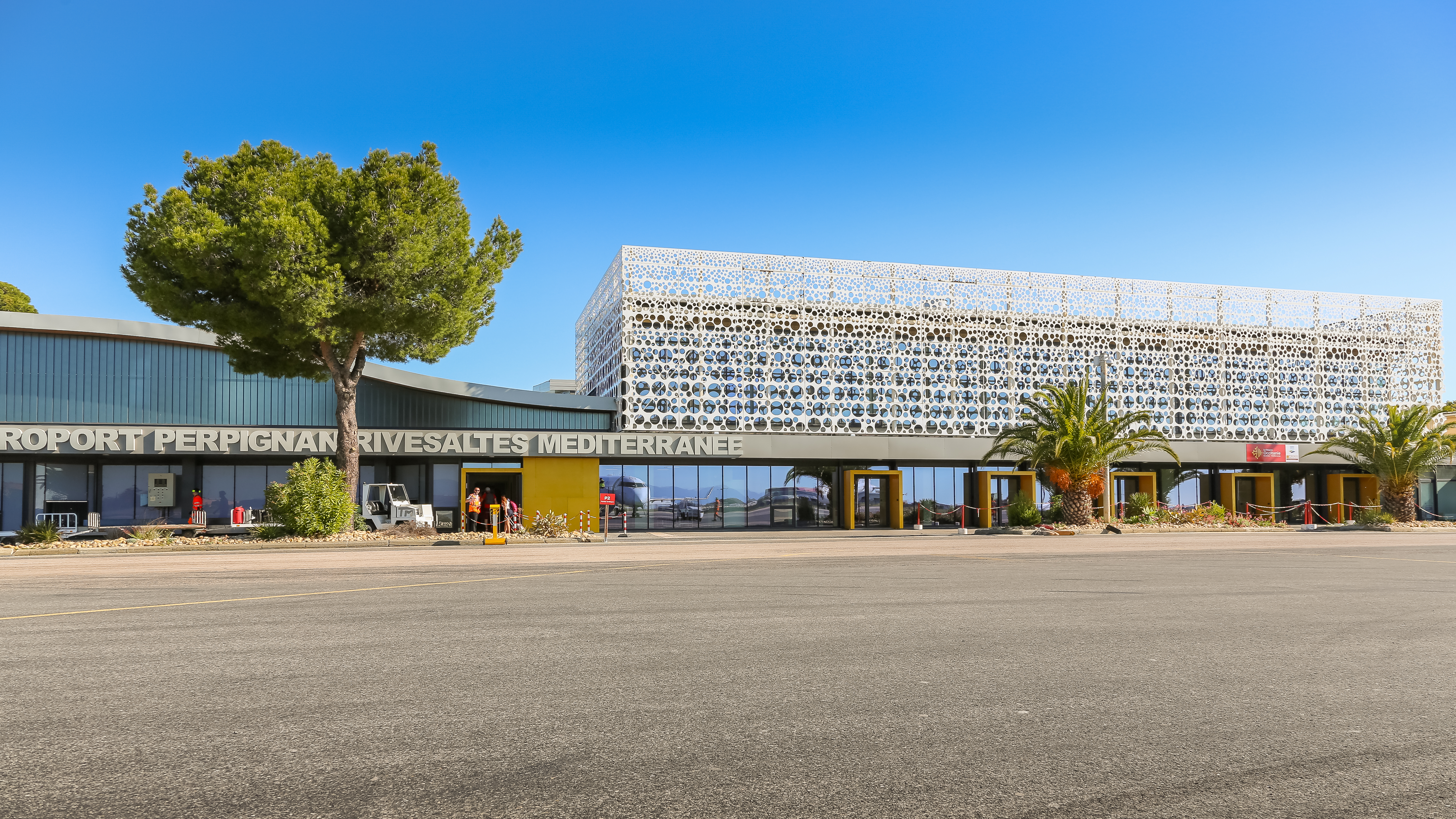
- IATA: PGF; ICAO: LFMP

Summary
- Airport type: Public
- Operator: SPLAR Société Publique Locale Aéroportuaire Régionale
- Serves: Perpignan / Rivesaltes, France
- Elevation AMSL: 144 ft (44 m)
- Coordinates: 42°44′26″N 002°52′14″E
- Website: www.aeroport-perpignan.com

Map
- Location of airport in Occitanie region LFMP (France)

Runways
Direction	Length		Surface
Direction	m	ft	Surface
15/33	2,500	8,202	Asphalt
13/31	1,265	4,150	Asphalt

Statistics (2018)
- Passengers: 463,235
- Passenger traffic change: ▲12.9%
- Source: French AIP, Aeroport.fr

Perpignan–Rivesaltes Airport (French: Aéroport de Perpignan – Rivesaltes) (IATA: PGF, ICAO: LFMP), also known as Llabanère Airport, as well as Aéroport de Perpignan – Sud de France, is a small international airport near Perpignan and Rivesaltes, both communes of the Pyrénées-Orientales Department in the Occitanie region of south France.

== Facilities ==
The airport is 144 feet (44 m) above mean sea level. It has two asphalt runways: 15/33 is 2,500 by 45 metres (8,202 ft × 148 ft) and 13/31 is 1,265 by 20 metres (4,150 ft × 66 ft).

== Airlines and destinations ==
The following airlines operate regular scheduled and charter flights at Perpignan–Rivesaltes Airport:

Airlines	Destinations
Aer Lingus	Seasonal: Dublin
ASL Airlines France	Seasonal: Oran
Jet2.com	Seasonal: Manchester (begins 2 May 2027)
Ryanair	Charleroi, Marrakesh; Seasonal: Birmingham, Leeds/Bradford, London–Stansted
Transavia	Paris–Orly
Volotea	Seasonal: Lille, Nantes

== Incidents and accidents ==
- On 27 November 2008, Flight 888T, an Airbus A320 (owned by Air New Zealand) operating for XL Airways Germany, crashed whilst on a test flight from Perpignan–Rivesaltes Airport. The aircraft stalled and crashed into the Mediterranean Sea, killing all seven on board. The aircraft was due to be returned to its original owner.
- On 25 July 2019, after rehearsing for a show, one of the France Air Force (Patrouille de France) planes crashed while landing. The pilot was able to escape. Some damage was caused to the fence on the northern side of the airport.

== Presidential airplanes ==
The airport serves as a maintenance facility for several presidential airplanes, including 5A-ONE, an Airbus A340 that flew Libya's Moammar Gadhafi, as well as Boeing 727s of Benin and Mauritania and an Airbus A340 that flies French President Emmanuel Macron.
