= Arlette Franco =

French politician (1939–2010)

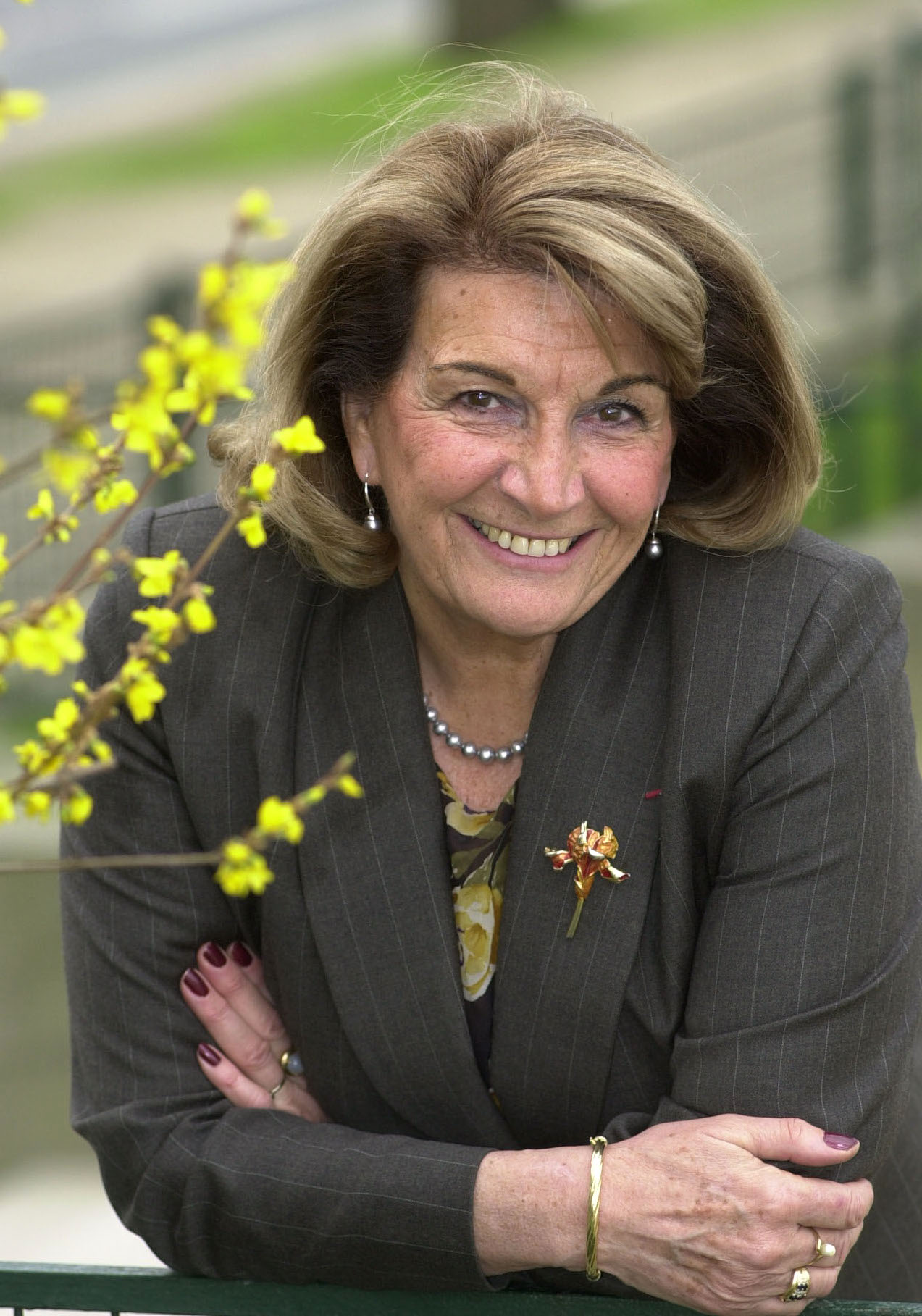
- Arlette Franco in 2007

Member of the National Assembly for Pyrénées-Orientales's 2nd constituency
- In office 19 June 2002 – 31 March 2010
- Succeeded by: Fernand Siré

Mayor of Canet-en-Roussillon
- In office 20 March 1989 – 31 March 2010
- Preceded by: Jacques Coupet
- Succeeded by: Bernard Dupont

Personal details
- Born: Arlette Martinez; 1 October 1939 Perpignan, France
- Died: 31 March 2010 (aged 70) Canet-en-Roussillon, France
- Party: RPR; UMP

Arlette Franco (1 October 1939, in Perpignan – 31 March 2010, in Canet-en-Roussillon) was a member of the National Assembly of France. She represented the Pyrénées-Orientales department, and was a member of the Union for a Popular Movement. She was also a vice-president of the French Swimming Federation.

== Biography ==
On June 19, 2002, she became a member of parliament for the 2nd constituency of the Pyrénées-Orientales, as part of the Union for a Popular Movement group. She was re-elected on June 17, 2007, with 59.78% of the votes cast in the second round. In 2007, she voted against the inclusion of the abolition of the death Capital punishment.

On March 9, 2008, the list she headed won the municipal election in Canet-en-Roussillon in the first round with 63.88% of the votes cast. Vice-president of the French Swimming Federation, she was behind the installation of the first Olympic swimming pool in the Pyrénées-Orientales department. Founder of the Canet 66 Natation sports club, she saw it grow with international-level swimmers. Shortly before her death, Arlette Franco paid tribute to her friend Henri Sérandour by inaugurating the new swimming pool in Canet-en-Roussillon named after him.

She underwent surgery in 2008 for a brain tumor, the effects of which left her disabled. She died on March 31, 2010, in Canet-en-Roussillon, as a result of the disease. She was replaced in the National Assembly by her deputy, Fernand Siré.
