= AirBaltic =

Flag carrier airline of Latvia

airBaltic

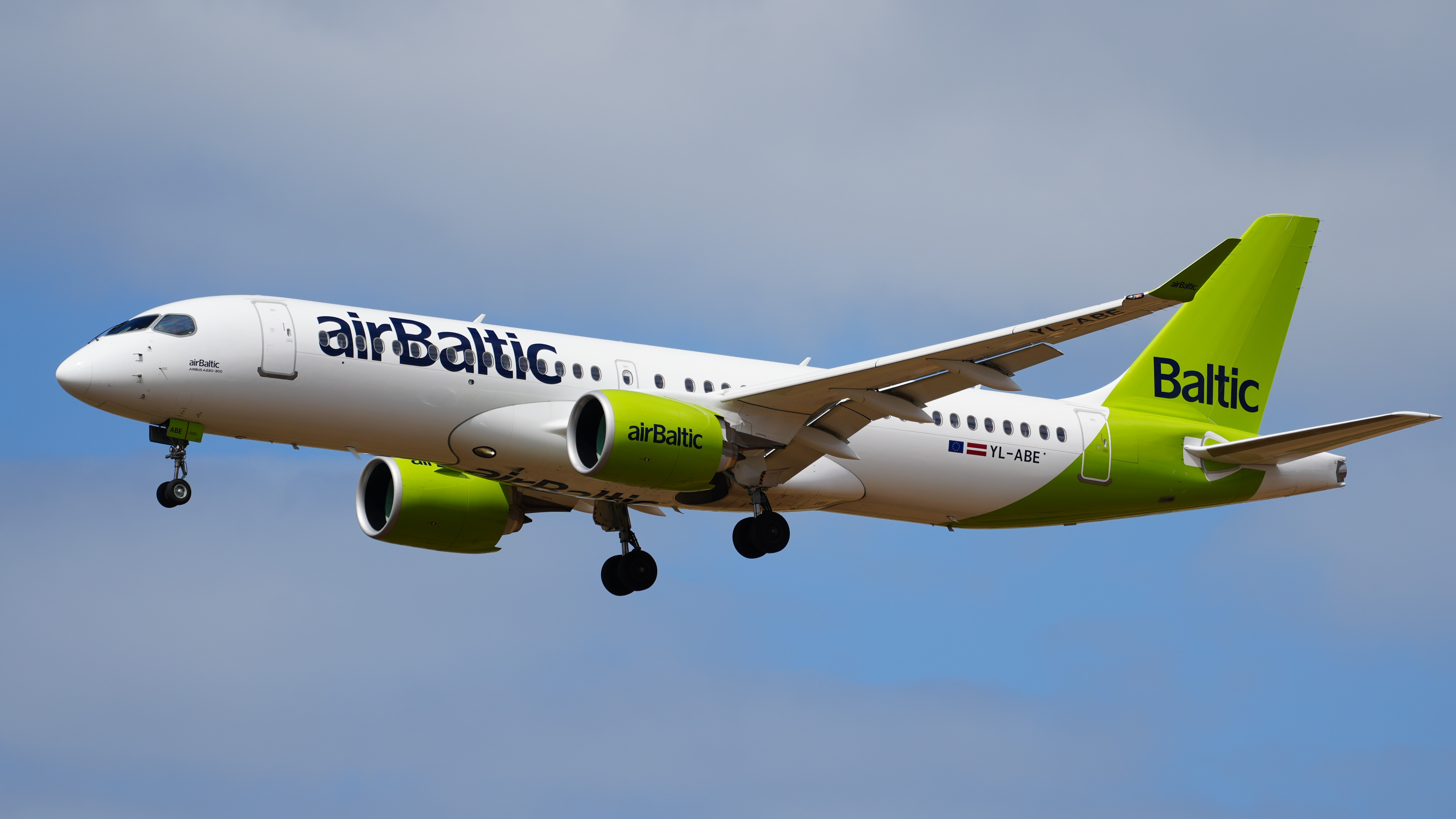
- An airBaltic Airbus A220-300
| IATA | ICAO | Call sign |
|---|---|---|
| BT | BTI | AIR BALTIC |
- Founded: 28 August 1995; 31 years ago
- Commenced operations: 1 October 1995; 31 years ago
- Hubs: Riga
- Secondary hubs: Tallinn; Vilnius
- Focus cities: Gran Canaria
- Frequent-flyer program: airBaltic Club
- Fleet size: 55
- Destinations: 70+
- Parent company: Government of Latvia (88.37%); Lufthansa Group (10%); Aircraft Leasing 1 SIA (1.62%); Other shareholders (0.01%)
- Headquarters: Mārupe municipality, Latvia
- Key people: Erno Hildén (CEO)
- Revenue: ▲€149.086 million (Q1 2026)
- Operating income: ▼€−28.889 million (Q1 2026)
- Net income: ▼€−70.064 million (Q1 2026)
- Total assets: ▲€1,552.428 million (March 2026)
- Total equity: ▼€−249.346 million (March 2026)
- Employees: ▲ Approximately 3,000 (September 2026)
- Website: airbaltic.com

airBaltic, legally incorporated as AS Air Baltic Corporation, is the flag carrier of Latvia. Its head office are located on the grounds of Riga International Airport in Mārupe municipality near Riga. Its main hub is Riga, and it operates bases in Tallinn, Vilnius, Tampere and a seasonal base in Las Palmas launched in 2023. It is majority owned (88.37%) by the government of Latvia. It operates solely Airbus A220 aircraft. On 14 September 2026, airBaltic filed for Chapter 11 bankruptcy protection in New York, United States. The airline also canceled its entire order for 40 Airbus A220 aircraft, valued at approximately US$3.5 billion.

== History ==
=== Early history ===
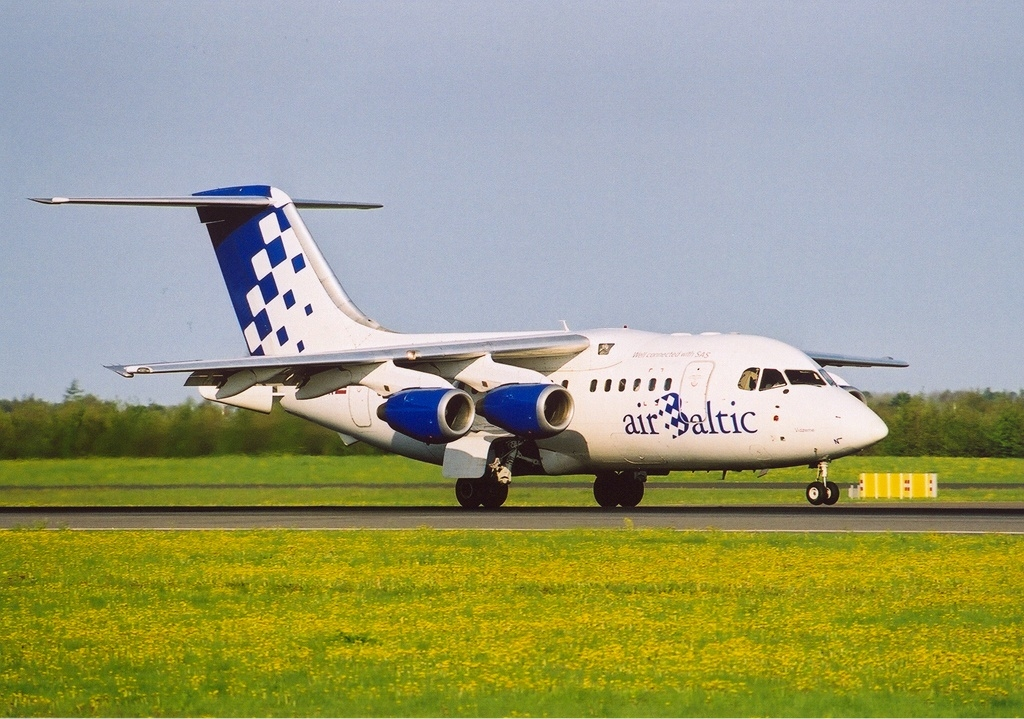
A former airBaltic Avro RJ70 in historic livery, which was retired in 2005

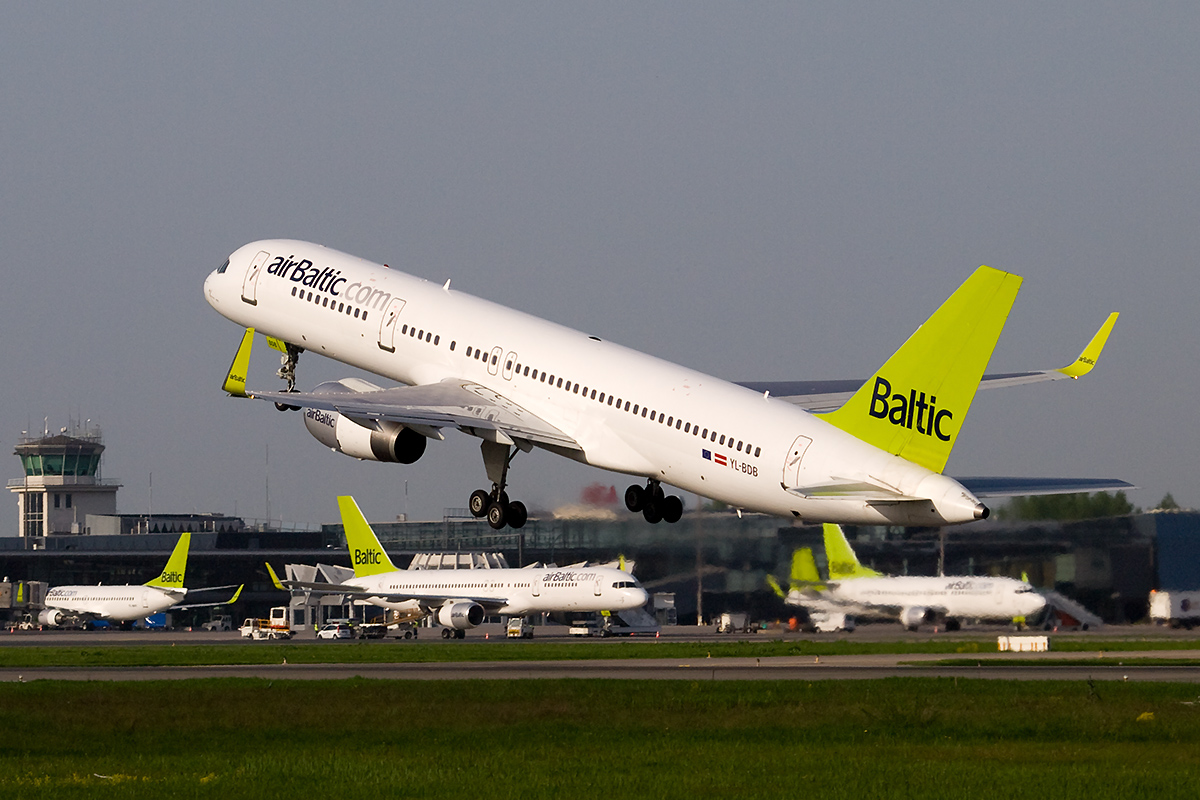
An airBaltic Boeing 757-200WL taking off from Riga International Airport, the airline's base, with other aircraft in the fleet in the background (2010)

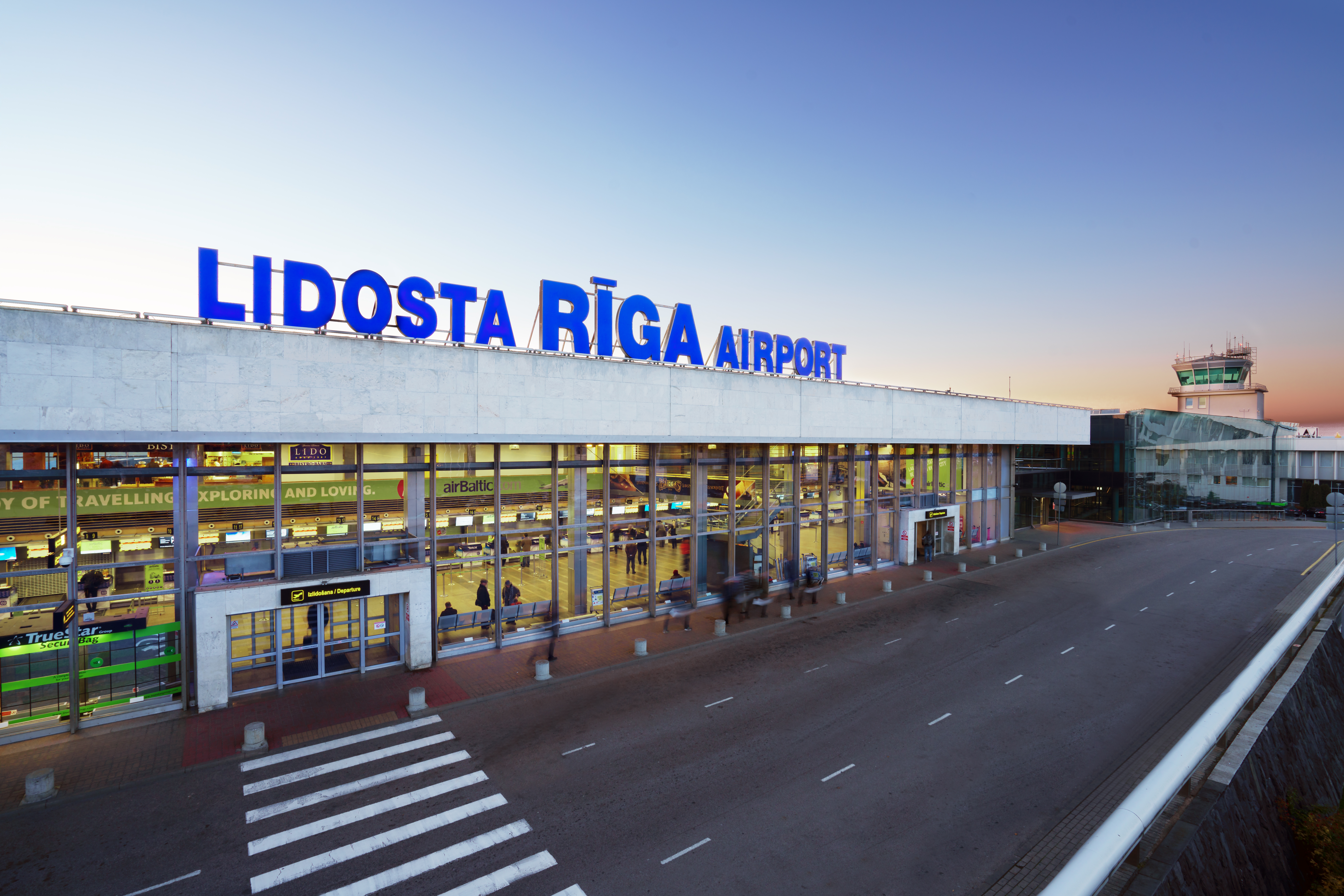
The airline's hub, Riga International Airport, also houses the corporate head offices.

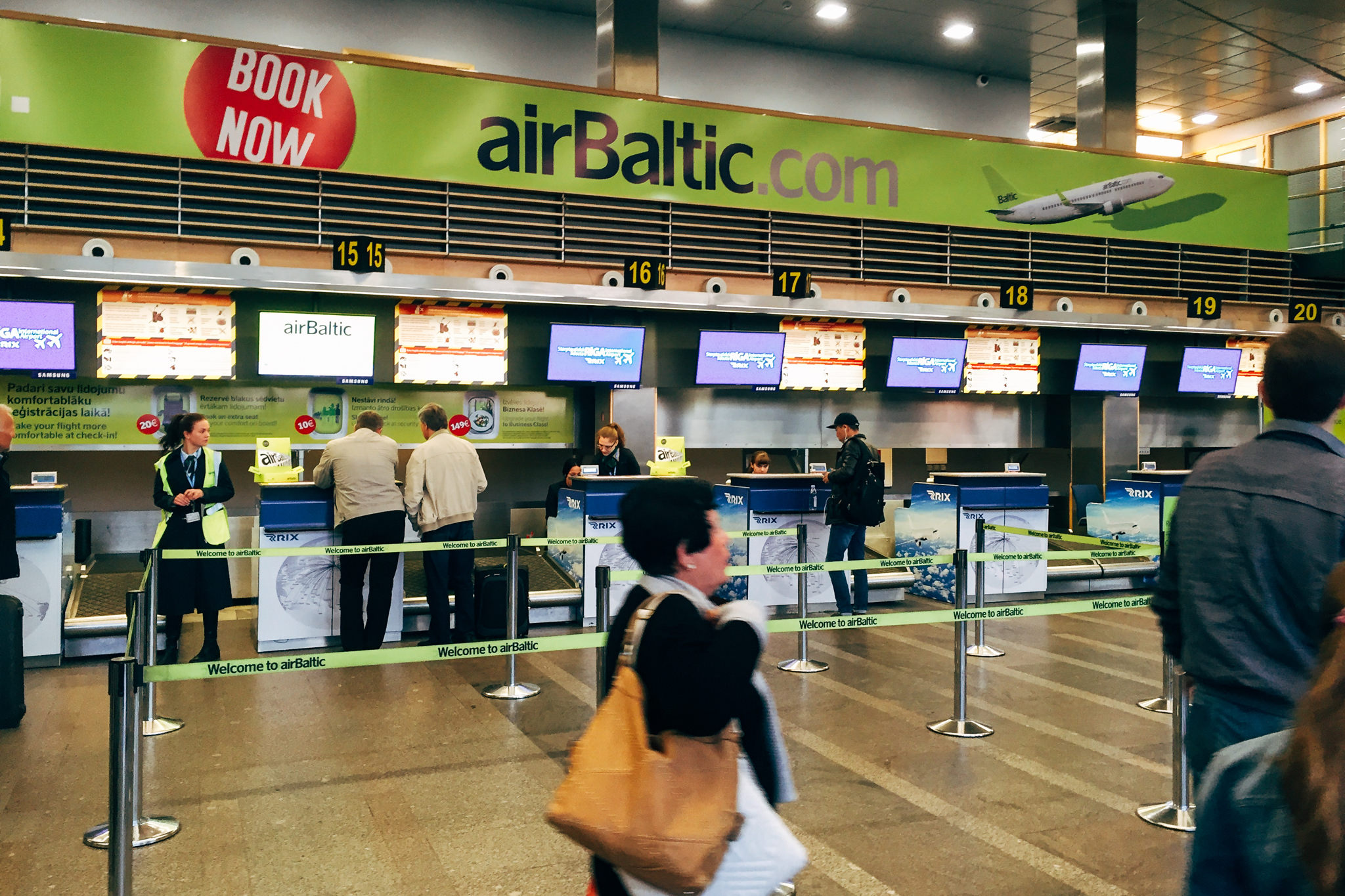
airBaltic check-in area at Riga International Airport (RIX)

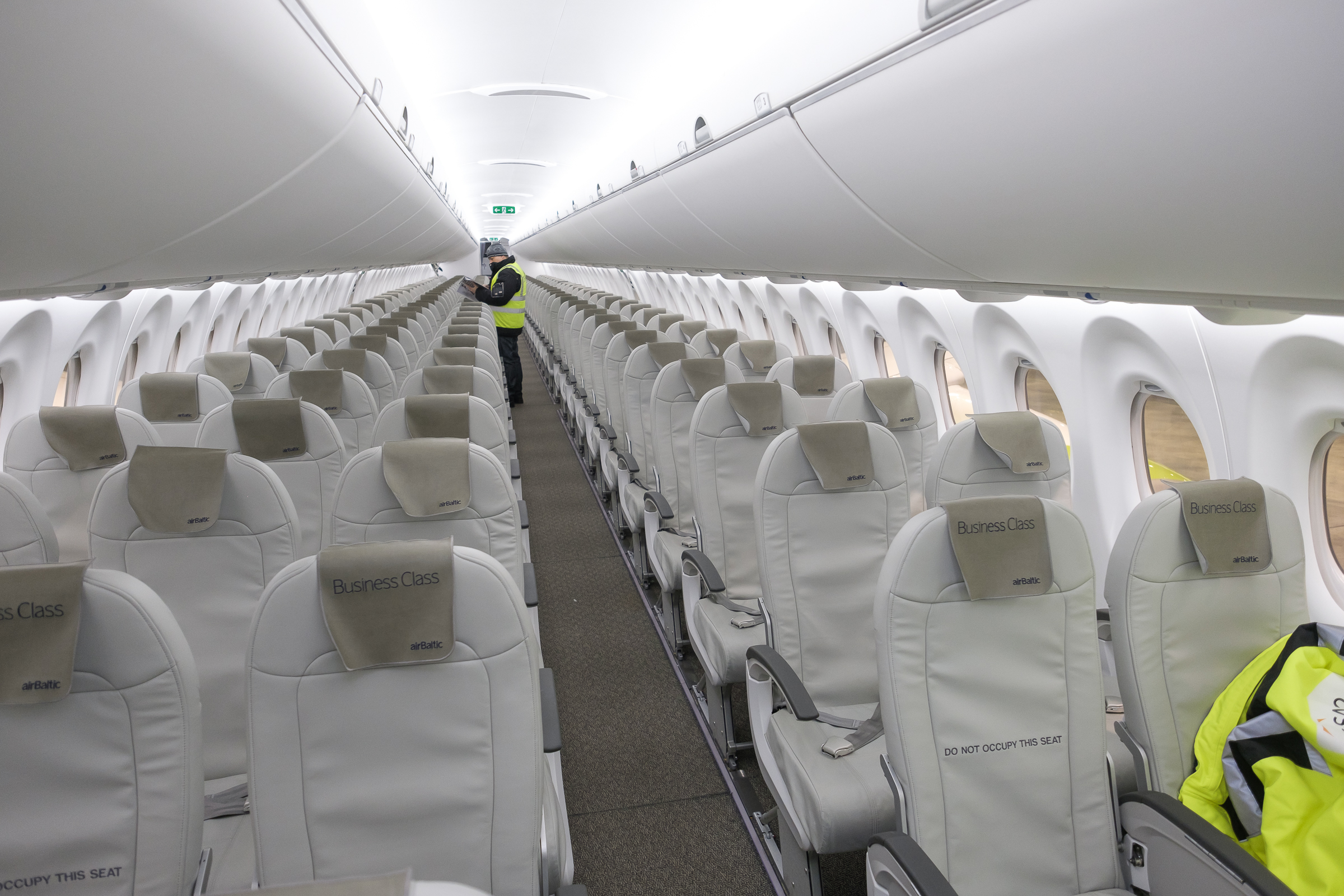
The cabin of an airBaltic Airbus A220

Baltic International Airlines (BIA) was a Latvian and US joint venture company owned by SIA Baltic International Airlines whose main airport was Riga International Airport. It was founded in June 1992, after the US-based private company Baltic International USA (BIUSA) failed to buy a part of the state-owned Latvian national airline Latavio. In the joint venture, the Latvian government owned 60%, while BIUSA owned 40%. After unsuccessful privatisation attempts, Latavio was declared insolvent in October 1995. It was liquidated and the Government of Latvia together with Baltic International Airlines created airBaltic.

The airline was established as Air Baltic on 28 August 1995 with the signing of a joint venture between Scandinavian Airlines (SAS) and the Government of Latvia. Operations started on 1 October 1995 with the first Air Baltic aircraft, a Saab 340, in Riga, and that afternoon, the plane made the first passenger flight for Air Baltic.

In 1996, the airline's first Avro RJ70 was delivered; and Air Baltic joined the SAS frequent flyer club as a partner. In 1997, a cargo department was established and, in 1998, the airline's first Fokker 50 plane was delivered. The adopted livery was mainly white, with the name of the airline written in blue on the forward fuselage, the 'B' logo being heavily stylised in blue checks. The checker blue pattern was repeated on the aircraft tailfin.

In 1999, Air Baltic became a joint stock company; it was previously a limited liability company. All of the Saab 340s were replaced by Fokker 50s. In September, the airline began operating under the European Aviation Operating Standards, or JAR ops. Air Baltic welcomed the new millennium by introducing new uniforms and opening a cargo centre at Riga's airport.

The first Boeing 737-500 joined the fleet in 2003, and on 1 June 2004, Air Baltic launched services from the Lithuanian capital, Vilnius, initially to five destinations. In October 2004, Air Baltic was rebranded as airBaltic. Its present livery consists of an all-white fuselage and lime tailfin. airBaltic.com is displayed on the forward upper fuselage, and the word "Baltic" is repeated in blue on the lower part of the tailfin. In December 2006, the first Boeing 737-300 joined the fleet and was configured with winglets. In July 2007, airBaltic introduced an online check-in system, the first online check-in system in the Baltic states. In the spring of 2008, two long-haul Boeing 757s were added to the fleet. In 2010, the airline began leasing De Havilland Canada Dash 8-400 aircraft, it retired these aircraft in 2023.

airBaltic had strong links with SAS, which owned 47.2% of the airline, and operated frequent flights to SAS hubs in Copenhagen, Oslo and Stockholm. Some of airBaltic's products and services are still shared with SAS, including co-ordinated timetabling and shared airport lounges. airBaltic is not a member of any airline alliance but does have codeshare agreements in place with several Star Alliance member airlines and others.

airBaltic had secondary hubs at Vilnius Airport and Tallinn Airport. The majority of the routes commenced from Tallinn were cancelled shortly after opening, leading to complaints from the Estonian Consumer Protection Department.

In January 2009, SAS sold its entire stake in the company (47.2% of the airline) to Baltijas aviācijas sistēmas Ltd (BAS) for 14 million lats. BAS was wholly owned by Bertolt Flick (President and CEO) until December 2010, when 50% of BAS shares were transferred to Taurus Asset Management Fund Limited, registered in the Bahamas.

=== Development since 2010 ===
In August 2011, airBaltic requested more than 60 million lats in capital as its losses continued to mount, and suffered speculation about its financial position and political scandals throughout 2011. In mid September 2011, the company announced plans to lay off around half its employees and cancel around 700 flights a month to avoid possible grounding. The company also announced that a mystery investor was willing to pay 9.6 million euros for an additional 59,110 shares. On 4 October 2011, the plans were annulled in order to make the necessary investments in the airline's capital. The government of Latvia and BAS agreed to invest around 100 million lats in the airline's share capital in proportion to their stakes in airBaltic. As part of the agreement its longtime president and CEO stepped down and Martin Gauss, former CEO of Hungarian airline Malév Hungarian Airlines, became the new CEO.

airBaltic had made an announcement on 23 September 2010 that it would establish a new secondary hub at Oulu Airport.

In early 2012, it was confirmed that Oulu hub plans were cancelled due to financial issues. The cost-cutting programme, initiated by airBaltic which aimed to return to profitability in 2014, scored better than planned results in 2012, by narrowing its losses to €27.2 million, from €121.5 in 2011.

The state's shareholding had been 99.8% since 30 November 2011, following the collapse of a bank linked with a finance package negotiated for the airline, but on 6 November 2015, it was reported that the Latvian Cabinet of Ministers had approved plans to sell 20% of airBaltic to German investor Ralf Dieter Montag-Girmes for €52 million and agreed to invest a further €80 million in the airline. The total of €132 million of fresh capital for the carrier is intended to spur its Horizon 2021 business plan and fleet modernisation. Following the closure of Air Lituanica and Estonian Air respectively in June and November 2015, and Nordica in November 2024, it is the only flag carrier in the Baltic countries.

The Bombardier CS300 delivery was much anticipated by airBaltic since this new aircraft type was originally planned to replace most of the airline's Boeing 737-300s and Boeing 737-500s and would replace all by 2020. The delivery of the CS300 happened on 29 November 2016, at 2 am ET. On 28 November, Bombardier and airBaltic held a ceremony in Mirabel, Quebec, Canada for the first delivery of the CS300. At 1:30 am, shortly before the scheduled departure, an oil leak from an engine was spotted. It delayed the departure, but at 2:23 am ET, the aircraft was now airBaltic's property. On board the inaugural flight, there were 18 people, including 6 pilots: 3 from Bombardier, and 3 from airBaltic. At 4:13 am ET, after a delay of over 2 hours, flight BT9801 took off en route to Stockholm. The airline received two CS300 in 2016 and expects to receive six in 2017, eight in 2018 and four more in 2020.

airBaltic was looking for opportunities to replace its Q400 turboprop fleet, and Bombardier and Embraer were viewed as potential future aircraft suppliers, with possible deliveries of 14 new aircraft beginning in 2020. On 26 September 2017, airBaltic announced it would buy at least 14 additional CSeries aircraft from Bombardier before the end of 2018; it planned to switch to an all-CSeries fleet by the early 2020s. Additional orders by airBaltic were announced by Bombardier on 28 May 2018 and included 30 CS300 with options and purchase rights for a further 30 CS300. Airbus purchased a 50.01% majority stake in the CSeries programme in October 2017, with the deal closing in July 2018; the aircraft family was subsequently renamed the Airbus A220.

airBaltic temporarily suspended operations on 17 March 2020 due to the coronavirus pandemic, and flights only restarted on a limited basis from 18 May 2020.

On 14 December 2021, airBaltic announced that its first secondary hub outside of the Baltic countries will be founded in Tampere–Pirkkala Airport in May 2022. In June 2023, airBaltic announced that it would establish a new seasonal base at Gran Canaria Airport, with two aircraft to be stationed there for the forthcoming winter season.

airBaltic began wet leasing its aircraft to other carriers in 2022, predominantly to Swiss. In 2023, it was approved for "long-term and unlimited wet leasing within Lufthansa Group." As of December 2023, airBaltic currently operates certain flights for Swiss.

After the pandemic, airBaltic unveiled a range of upgrades focused on enhancing the experience for its clients. In 2022, airBaltic debuted the Planies NFT collection, offering perks towards the airBaltic Club loyalty programme. Then, in 2023, airBaltic forged a partnership with Starlink to offer unrestricted complimentary in-flight Wi-Fi in their routes, marking a pioneering move in Europe's aviation industry. Installation of the service commenced in 2023 and will be finalised by 2025.

In November 2023, airBaltic announced that Delta Air Lines would begin codesharing 20 routes to their bases.

In January 2025, airBaltic announced that it was facing disruptions due to Pratt & Whitney engine maintenance delays on its A220 fleet. The airline suspended 19 routes, reduced frequencies on 21 others and cancelled 4,670 flights, affecting 67,160 passengers. Despite these challenges and capacity constraints due to the wet-leasing of almost half of its fleet to Lufthansa Group, airBaltic still maintains over 70 destinations.

On 29 January 2025, The Ministry of Transport of Latvia, airBaltic, and Lufthansa Group announced the signing of an agreement for Lufthansa Group to invest EUR 14 million in airBaltic for a minority stake, and supervisory board seat. In return for its investment, Lufthansa Group will receive a convertible share granting a 10% stake, which will be issued at a subscription price of EUR 14 million and converted into ordinary shares upon a potential IPO of airBaltic.

In March 2025, airBaltic announced that it would resume flights to Ukraine once the country's airspace is reopened.

On 7 April 2025, Martin Gauss was ousted as CEO he no longer had the confidence of the Latvian government. Taking over as interim CEO is former COO Pauls Cālītis, who started his career at Air Baltic 30 years ago, also as a pilot. Finn Erno Hildén assumed the position of CEO on 1 December 2025. Hildén has previous experience at Finnair and SAS.

In September 2026, airBaltic filed for Chapter 11 bankruptcy in an effort to restructure its heavy debt burden.

== Corporate affairs ==
The current head office at Riga Airport opened in 2016.

=== Ownership ===
airBaltic is a joint-stock company, with current shareholders (as of March 2026):

| Shareholders | Interest |
|---|---|
| State of the Republic of Latvia (represented by the Ministry of Transport) | 88.37% |
| Lufthansa Group | 10% |
| Aircraft Leasing 1 SIA (wholly owned by private investor Lars Thuesen) | 1.62% |
| Others | 0.01% |
| Total | 100% |

=== Financials ===
The airline's full accounts have not always been published regularly; figures disclosed by airBaltic via various publications are shown below (for years ending 31 December):

| Year | Turnover (€m) | Net profit (€m) | Number of employees (Note: at year end) | Number of passengers (m) | Passenger load factor (%) | Number of aircraft | References |
|---|---|---|---|---|---|---|---|
| 2007 | | | | | | 21 | |
| 2008 | | | | 2.6 | 62 | 28 | |
| 2009 | 261 | 20 | | 2.8 | 68 | 31 | |
| 2010 | 292 | −52 | 1,443 | 3.2 | 69 | 35 | |
| 2011 | 327 | −121 | | 3.3 | 75 | 34 | |
| 2012 | 325 | −27 | 1,100 | 3.1 | 72 | 28 | |
| 2013 | 325 | 1 | | 2.9 | | 25 | |
| 2014 | 300 | 9 | | 2.6 | 70 | 24 | |
| 2015 | 285 | 19.5 | 1,171 | 2.6 | 71 | 24 | |
| 2016 | 286 | 1.2 | 1,266 | 2.9 | 74 | 25 | |
| 2017 | 348 | 4.6 | 1,415 | 3.5 | 76 | 30 | |
| 2018 | 409 | 5.4 | 1,585 | 4.1 | 75 | 34 | |
| 2019 | 503 | −7.7 | 1,716 | 5.0 | 76 | 39 | |
| 2020 | 140 (Note: Reclassified) | −278 | 1,195 | 1.3 | 52 | 37 | |
| 2021 | 202 | −134 | 1,559 | 1.6 | 54 | 44 | |
| 2022 | 500 | −54.2 | 2,143 | 3.3 | 71 | 39 | |
| 2023 | 668 | 33.7 | 2,531 | 4.5 | 77 | 46 | |
| 2024 | 747 | −118.2 | 2,786 | 5.1 | 81 | 49 | |
| 2025 | 779 | −44.3 | 2,800+ | 5.2 | 80 | 53 | |

== Destinations ==
airBaltic operates direct year-round and seasonal short-haul flights from Riga, Tallinn and Vilnius, mostly to metropolitan and leisure destinations within Europe and Middle East. airBaltic does not operate long-haul flights, but has code shares with partners with multiple airlines, to allow through-ticketed long-haul flights.

Here is the full list of destinations to which airBaltic flies:

| Country/region | City | Airport | Status | Ref. |
|---|---|---|---|---|
| Albania | Tirana | Tirana International Airport Nënë Tereza | Seasonal | |
| Armenia | Yerevan | Zvartnots International Airport | Seasonal | |
| Austria | Innsbruck | Innsbruck Airport | Seasonal | |
| Austria | Salzburg | Salzburg Airport | Seasonal | |
| Austria | Vienna | Vienna International Airport | | |
| Azerbaijan | Baku | Heydar Aliyev International Airport | Seasonal | |
| Belarus | Minsk | Minsk National Airport | Terminated | |
| Belgium | Brussels | Brussels Airport | | |
| Bulgaria | Sofia | Vasil Levski Sofia Airport | Seasonal | |
| Croatia | Dubrovnik | Dubrovnik Airport | Seasonal | |
| Croatia | Split | Split Airport | Seasonal | |
| Cyprus | Larnaca | Larnaca International Airport | | |
| Czech Republic | Prague | Václav Havel Airport Prague | | |
| Denmark | Billund | Billund Airport | | |
| Denmark | Copenhagen | Copenhagen Airport | | |
| Egypt | Hurghada | Hurghada International Airport | Seasonal | |
| Egypt | Sharm El Sheikh | Sharm El Sheikh International Airport | Seasonal | |
| Estonia | Tallinn | Tallinn Airport | Hub | |
| Finland | Helsinki | Helsinki Airport | | |
| Finland | Kittilä | Kittilä Airport | Seasonal | |
| Finland | Kuusamo | Kuusamo Airport | Begins 11 December 2026 | |
| Finland | Oulu | Oulu Airport | | |
| Finland | Tampere | Tampere–Pirkkala Airport | Focus city | |
| Finland | Turku | Turku Airport | | |
| France | Nice | Nice Côte d'Azur Airport | Seasonal | |
| France | Paris | Charles de Gaulle Airport | | |
| Georgia | Batumi | Batumi International Airport | Seasonal | |
| Georgia | Tbilisi | Tbilisi International Airport | | |
| Germany | Berlin | Berlin Brandenburg Airport | | |
| Germany | Berlin | Berlin Tegel Airport | Terminated | |
| Germany | Cologne | Cologne Bonn Airport | Terminated | |
| Germany | Düsseldorf | Düsseldorf Airport | | |
| Germany | Frankfurt | Frankfurt Airport | | |
| Germany | Hamburg | Hamburg Airport | | |
| Germany | Munich | Munich Airport | | |
| Germany | Stuttgart | Stuttgart Airport | Terminated | |
| Greece | Athens | Athens International Airport | | |
| Greece | Corfu | Corfu International Airport | Seasonal | |
| Greece | Heraklion | Heraklion International Airport | Seasonal | |
| Greece | Mykonos | Mykonos Airport | Seasonal | |
| Greece | Rhodes | Rhodes International Airport | Seasonal | |
| Greece | Thessaloniki | Thessaloniki Airport | | |
| Hungary | Budapest | Budapest Ferenc Liszt International Airport | Seasonal | |
| Iceland | Reykjavík | Keflavík International Airport | | |
| Ireland | Dublin | Dublin Airport | | |
| Israel | Tel Aviv | David Ben Gurion Airport | | |
| Italy | Catania | Catania–Fontanarossa Airport | Seasonal | |
| Italy | Milan | Milan Malpensa Airport | | |
| Italy | Naples | Naples International Airport | Seasonal | |
| Italy | Olbia | Olbia Costa Smeralda Airport | Seasonal | |
| Italy | Pisa | Pisa International Airport | Seasonal | |
| Italy | Rome | Rome Fiumicino Airport | | |
| Italy | Turin | Turin Airport | Seasonal | |
| Italy | Venice | Venice Marco Polo Airport | Seasonal | |
| Italy | Verona | Verona Villafranca Airport | Seasonal | |
| Kosovo | Pristina | Pristina International Airport | Seasonal | |
| Latvia | Liepāja | Liepāja International Airport | Terminated | |
| Latvia | Riga | Riga International Airport | Hub | |
| Lithuania | Palanga | Palanga International Airport | | |
| Lithuania | Kaunas | Kaunas Airport | Suspended from 7 May 2026 | |
| Lithuania | Vilnius | Vilnius Čiurlionis International Airport | Hub | |
| Malta | Valletta | Malta International Airport | Seasonal | |
| Moldova | Chișinău | Chișinău Eugen Doga International Airport | Seasonal | |
| Montenegro | Tivat | Tivat Airport | Seasonal | |
| Morocco | Agadir | Agadir–Al Massira Airport | Seasonal | |
| Morocco | Marrakesh | Marrakesh Menara Airport | Seasonal | |
| Netherlands | Amsterdam | Amsterdam Airport Schiphol | | |
| North Macedonia | Skopje | Skopje International Airport | Seasonal | |
| Norway | Bergen | Bergen Airport, Flesland | Seasonal | |
| Norway | Oslo | Oslo Airport, Gardermoen | | |
| Norway | Stavanger | Stavanger Airport | Seasonal | |
| Poland | Kraków | Kraków John Paul II International Airport | Seasonal | |
| Poland | Rzeszów | Rzeszów–Jasionka Airport | Seasonal | |
| Portugal | Faro | Gago Coutinho International Airport | | |
| Portugal | Funchal | Cristiano Ronaldo International Airport | Seasonal | |
| Portugal | Lisbon | Humberto Delgado Airport | | |
| Portugal | Porto | Francisco Sá Carneiro Airport | | |
| Romania | Bucharest | Bucharest Henri Coandă International Airport | | |
| Romania | Cluj-Napoca | Cluj International Airport | Seasonal | |
| Russia | Moscow | Sheremetyevo International Airport | Terminated | |
| Russia | Saint Petersburg | Pulkovo Airport | Terminated | |
| Serbia | Belgrade | Belgrade Nikola Tesla Airport | Seasonal | |
| Slovenia | Ljubljana | Ljubljana Jože Pučnik Airport | Seasonal | |
| Spain | Alicante | Alicante–Elche Miguel Hernández Airport | | |
| Spain | Barcelona | Josep Tarradellas Barcelona–El Prat Airport | | |
| Spain | Gran Canaria | Gran Canaria Airport | Seasonal | |
| Spain | Madrid | Madrid–Barajas Airport | | |
| Spain | Málaga | Málaga Airport | | |
| Spain | Palma de Mallorca | Palma de Mallorca Airport | Seasonal | |
| Spain | Tenerife | Tenerife South Airport | Seasonal | |
| Spain | Valencia | Valencia Airport | Seasonal | |
| Sweden | Gothenburg | Göteborg Landvetter Airport | Seasonal | |
| Sweden | Stockholm | Stockholm Arlanda Airport | | |
| Switzerland | Geneva | Geneva Airport | Seasonal | |
| Switzerland | Zurich | Zurich Airport | | |
| Turkey | Istanbul | Atatürk Airport | Airport Closed | |
| Turkey | Istanbul | Istanbul Airport | | |
| Ukraine | Kyiv | Boryspil International Airport | Terminated | |
| United Arab Emirates | Dubai | Dubai International Airport | | |
| United Kingdom | Aberdeen | Aberdeen Airport | Terminated | |
| United Kingdom | London | Gatwick Airport | | |
| United Kingdom | London | Heathrow Airport | | |
| United Kingdom | Manchester | Manchester Airport | Resumes 13 December 2026 | |

=== Codeshare agreements ===
airBaltic maintains codeshare agreements with the following airlines:

- Aegean Airlines
- Air Canada
- Air France
- Air Serbia
- Austrian Airlines
- Azerbaijan Airlines
- British Airways
- Brussels Airlines
- Bulgaria Air
- Delta Air Lines
- El Al Israel Airlines
- Emirates
- Iberia
- Icelandair
- ITA Airways
- KLM
- KM Malta Airlines
- LOT Polish Airlines
- Lufthansa
- Scandinavian Airlines
- Swiss International Air Lines
- TAP Air Portugal
- TAROM
- Turkish Airlines
- Uzbekistan Airways

== Fleet ==
=== Current fleet ===
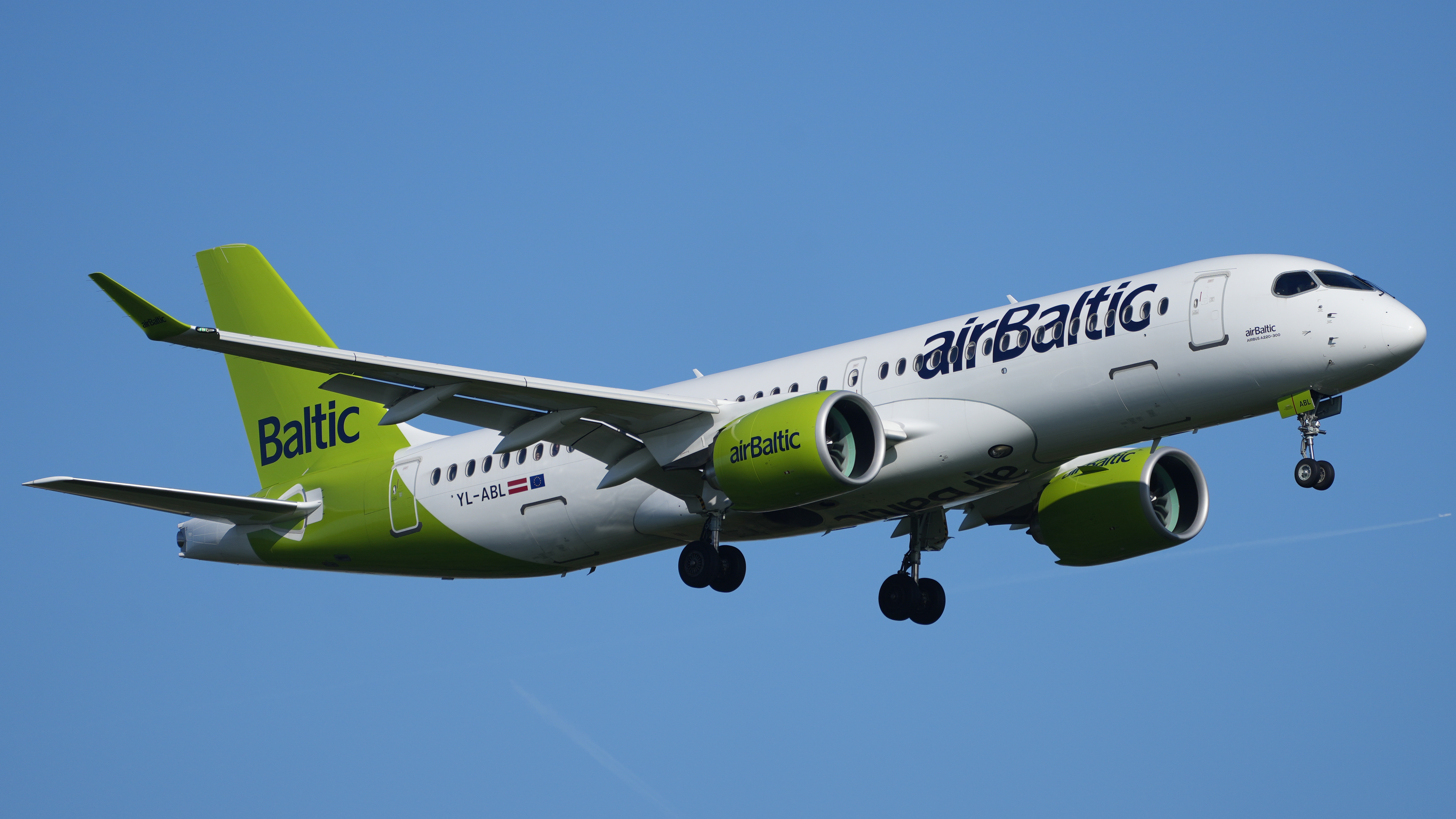
airBaltic Airbus A220-300

As of September 2026, airBaltic operates an all-Airbus A220 fleet composed of the following aircraft:

airBaltic fleet
| Aircraft | In service | Orders | Passengers | Notes |
|---|---|---|---|---|
| Airbus A220-300 | 55 | 44 | 148 | Four painted in Baltic states liveries. |
| Total | 55 | 44 | | |

=== Fleet development ===
The airline is on-track to become the largest A220-300 operator in Europe. airBaltic had previously announced plans to increase their fleet to 99 by 2032.

However, in August 2026 the airline announced plans to reduce fleet size to about 36 aircraft by the end of 2026, which will gradually increase to 40 by 2031, making a significant turn compared to previous plans to operate about 100 aircraft.

=== Former fleet ===
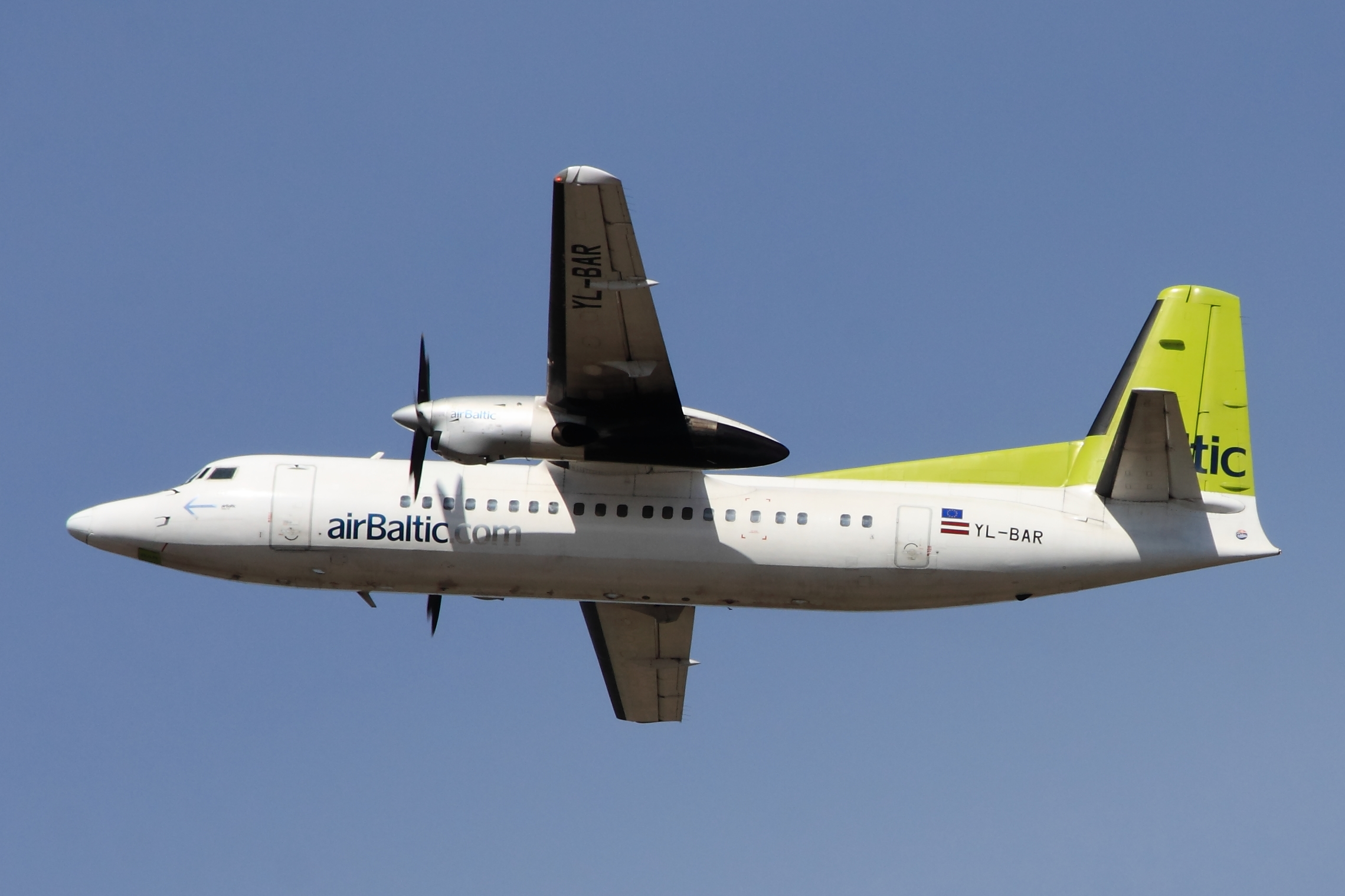
A former airBaltic Fokker 50 in 2012.

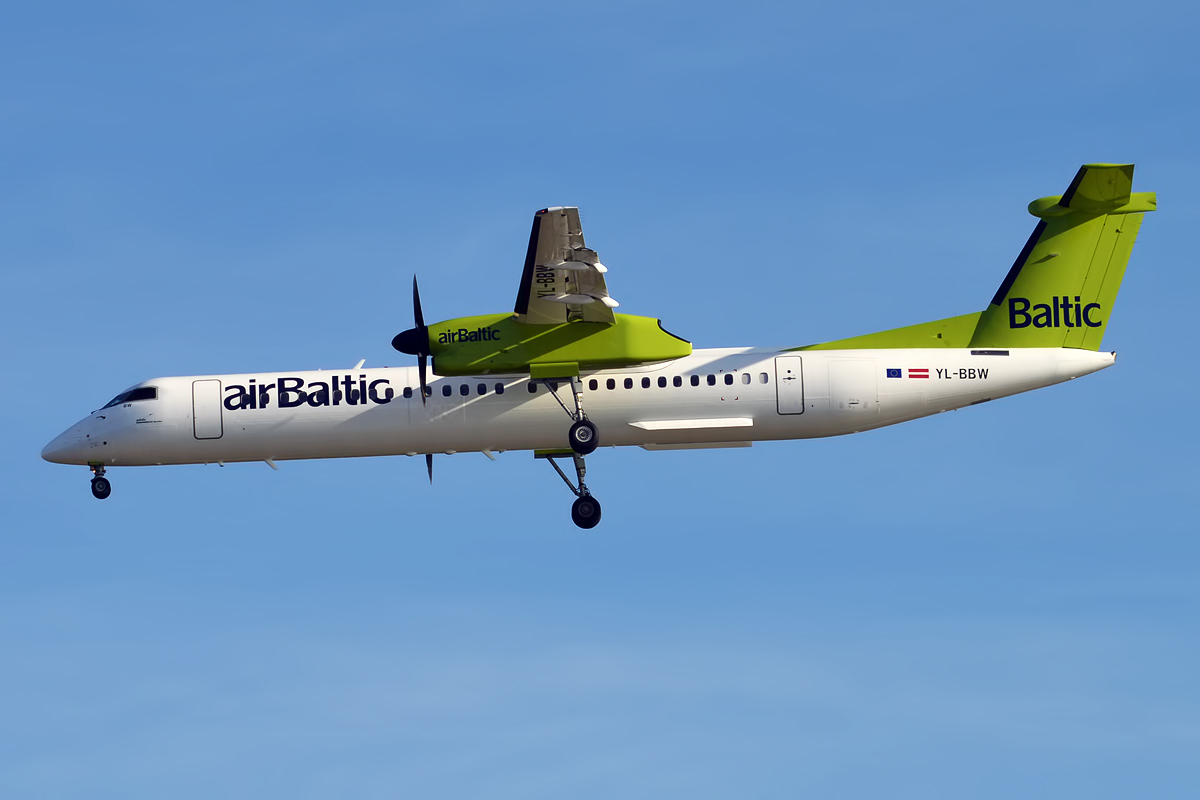
A former airBaltic De Havilland Canada Dash 8-400 in 2017.

In the past, airBaltic has previously operated the following aircraft types:

| Aircraft | Total | Introduced | Retired | Replacement | Notes |
|---|---|---|---|---|---|
| Airbus A319-100 | 1 | 2013 | 2014 | Airbus A220-300 | Leased from Czech Airlines. |
| Airbus A320-200 | 4 | 2023 | 2023 | None | Leased from Avion Express. |
| Avro RJ70 | 3 | 1996 | 2005 | None | |
| Boeing 737-300 | 9 | 2007 | 2020 | Airbus A220-300 | |
| Boeing 737-500 | 11 | 2003 | 2019 | Airbus A220-300 | |
| Boeing 757-200 | 2 | 2008 | 2014 | None | |
| British Aerospace 146-200 | 1 | 1995 | 1996 | Avro RJ70 | Leased from Manx Airlines. |
| De Havilland Canada Dash 8-400 | 12 | 2010 | 2023 | Airbus A220-300 | |
| Fokker 50 | 10 | 1998 | 2013 | De Havilland Canada Dash 8-400 | |
| Saab 340 | 3 | 1995 | 1999 | Fokker 50 | |

=== Livery ===
The original livery was painted on Avro RJ70s and had a white fuselage. The original airBaltic colour scheme, blue and white, was painted on the engines and the vertical stabiliser. The second generation livery also had a lime green wingtip and vertical stabiliser; however, the logo was changed to airBaltic.com, and the word airBaltic was painted on the engines, which were in their original metallic colour.

Until December 2019, the livery consisted of a white fuselage and lime green vertical stabiliser, wingtips and engines. In December 2019, the rear fuselage below the vertical stabiliser was also painted in lime green, with the tail cone remained white. The logo, stylised 'airBaltic', is painted in dark blue on the fuselage across the windows and on the underside of the aircraft. This livery is mainly used on A319, A320, A320neo and A220.

==== Special liveries ====
In order to represent the three Baltic states, four of the A220s have been painted in a series of national flag liveries - one each for Estonia and Lithuania, two for Latvia.

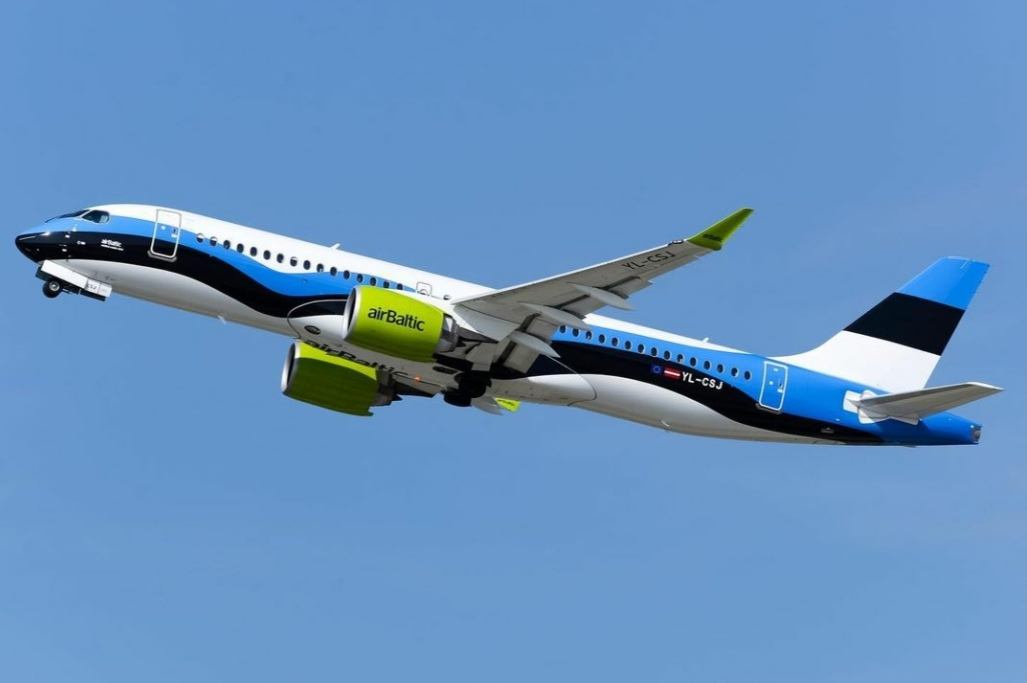
Estonian flag livery

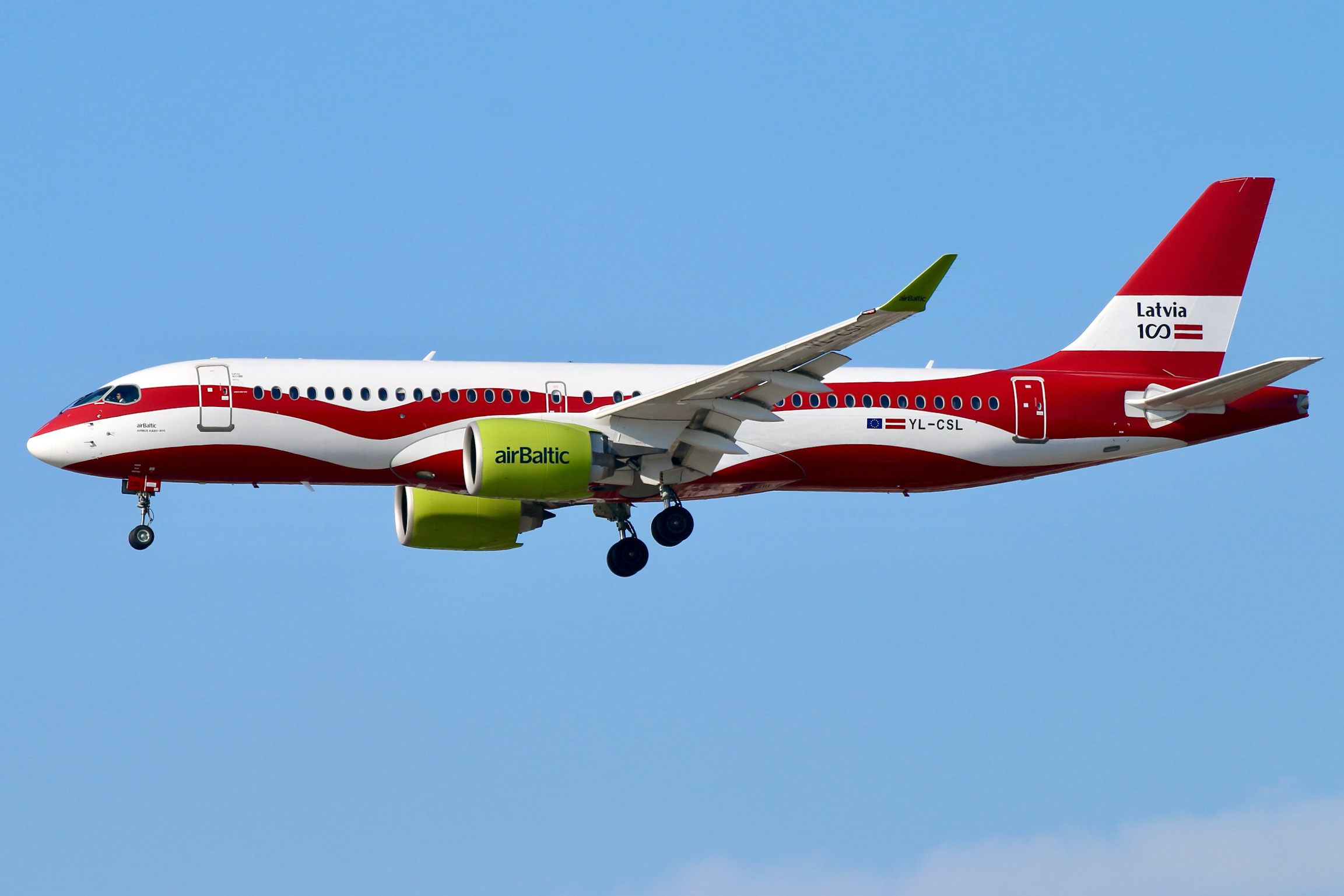
Latvian flag livery

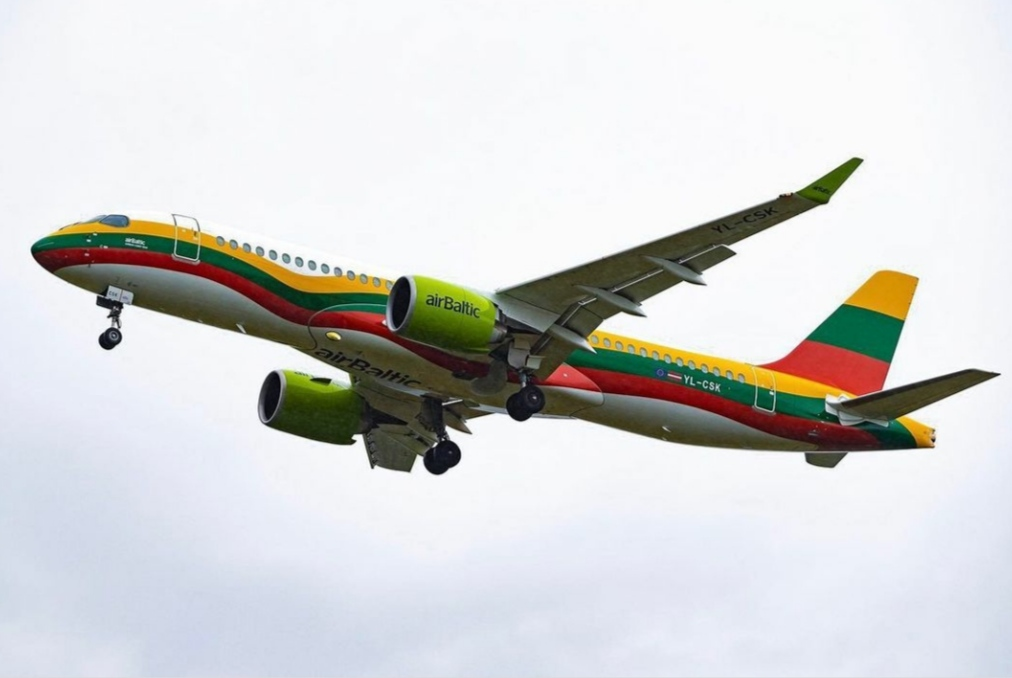
Lithuanian flag livery

Another special livery was unveiled for airBaltic's 50th Airbus A220-300. This striking livery portrays an artistic depiction of a girl soaring through the clouds with long, flowing hair crowned by a traditional wreath and proudly featuring the Latvian flag. The design also incorporates several other elements that are inspired by the rich heritage and nature of the Baltic region – a ladybug, a swallow, and a stork. The final sketch of the design was modified and redesigned by airBaltic to meet the technical requirements of the aircraft.

== Award and recognition ==
On 24 June 2024, airBaltic was voted 2024 Best Airline in Eastern Europe by Skytrax.

== Accidents and incidents ==
- A drunk airBaltic crew including a co-pilot at seven times legal alcohol limit was stopped by the police in Oslo before a flight in 2015. The second officer was sentenced to six months' jail while the captain and flight attendants also faced proceedings after a tip-off stopped them from taking charge of flight from Norway.
- On 17 September 2016, an airBaltic de Havilland Dash 8-400, registered YL-BAI, performing flight BT-641, landed at Riga without its nose gear due to problems with the nose gear.
- On 6 December 2017, due to heavy winds and a slippery surface, an airBaltic Boeing 737-500 slid off a taxiway after landing in Moscow Sheremetyevo International Airport.
- On 3 December 2021, due to heavy snowfall, an airBaltic Airbus A220-300 (YL-CSE) slid off the runway after the landing at Riga Airport from Stockholm (flight BT102).
- On 9 March 2023, due to heavy snowfall, an airBaltic Airbus A220-300 (YL-AAP) slid off the runway after the landing at Riga Airport from Paris (flight BT694).
- On 14 June 2025, an airBaltic Airbus A220-300 (YL-AAO), was undergoing an Auxiliary Power Unit (APU) ground-run during scheduled maintenance when a fire ignited in the centre section of the aircraft. This caused severe heat damage to the fuselage and wing root section. In December 2025, Airbus Engineering concluded that the aircraft was uneconomical to repair. This is the first hull loss of an A220 aircraft.
