= Bertolt Flick =

German businessman (born 1964)

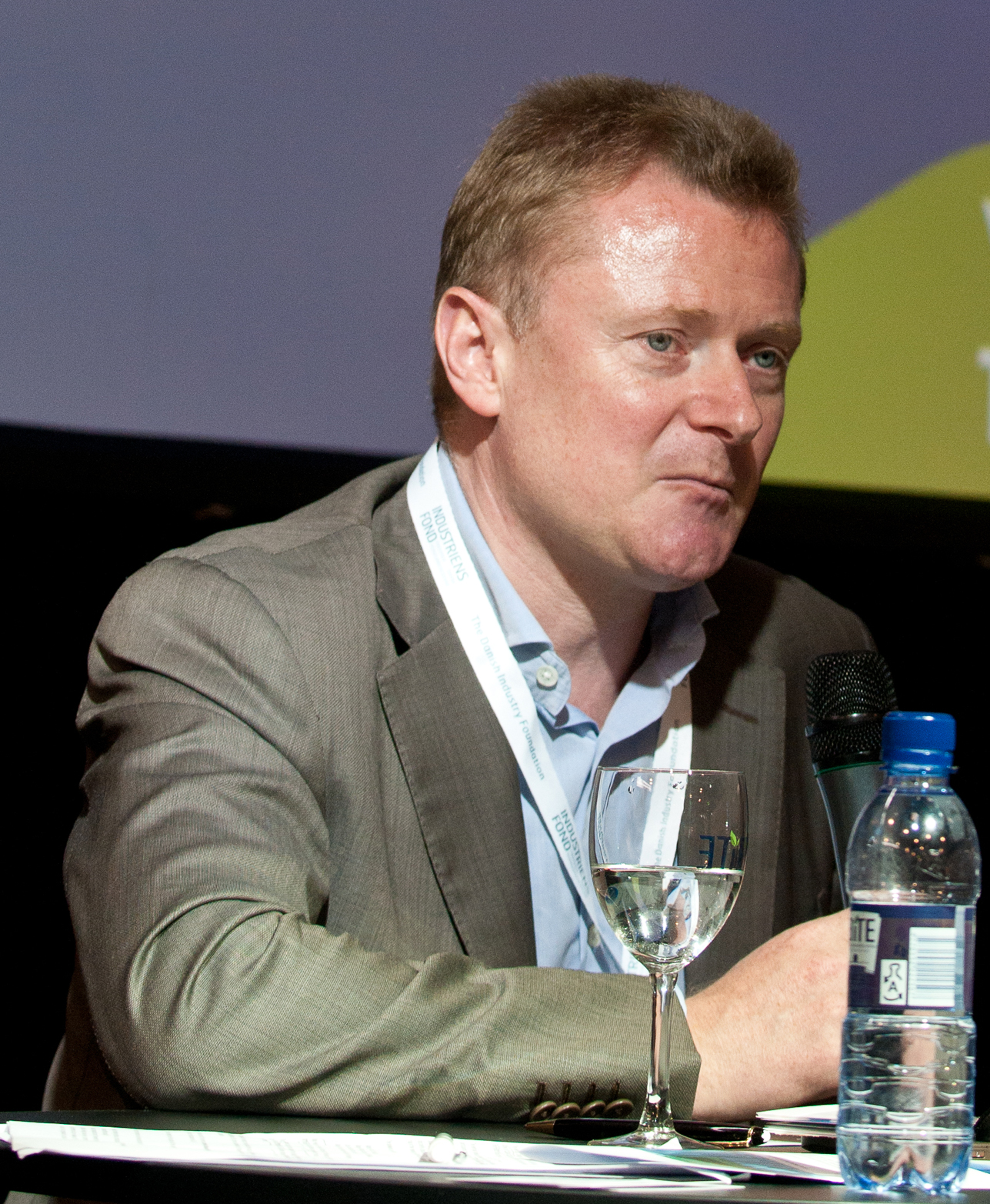
Bertolt Flick, 2010

Bertolt Martin Flick (born 1964, Germany) is a German businessman, the former president and CEO of airBaltic airline.

He has a law degree from the University of Heidelberg, Germany.

In 1995, Flick became a member of airBaltic's supervisory board and in 1999 he was elected the chairman of the board. Between 2002 and 2011, he was the president and CEO of the company. On January 30, 2009, Flick purchased a 47.2% stake in airBaltic from Scandinavian Airlines via Baltijas aviācijas sistēmas Ltd (BAS) for 14 million lats. BAS was wholly owned by Flick until December 2010, when 50% of BAS shares were transferred to Taurus Asset Management Fund Limited, registered in the Bahamas. The beneficiaries of the company were widely disputed.

Under the leadership of Flick, airBaltic lost 173 million euros between 2010 and 2011. In August 2011, airBaltic requested more than 60 million lats in capital as its losses continued to mount, and suffered speculation about its financial position and political scandals throughout 2011. In mid-September 2011, the company announced plans to lay off around half its employees and cancel around 700 flights a month to avoid possible grounding. The government of Latvia and BAS agreed to invest around 100 million lats in the airline's share capital in proportion to their stakes in AirBaltic. In connection with the agreement, Flick stepped down as long-term president and CEO of the airline.

He became the president of the Frankfurt-am-Main based charter airline XL Airways in 2012.
