= Henri Sérandour =

French water polo player (1937–2009)

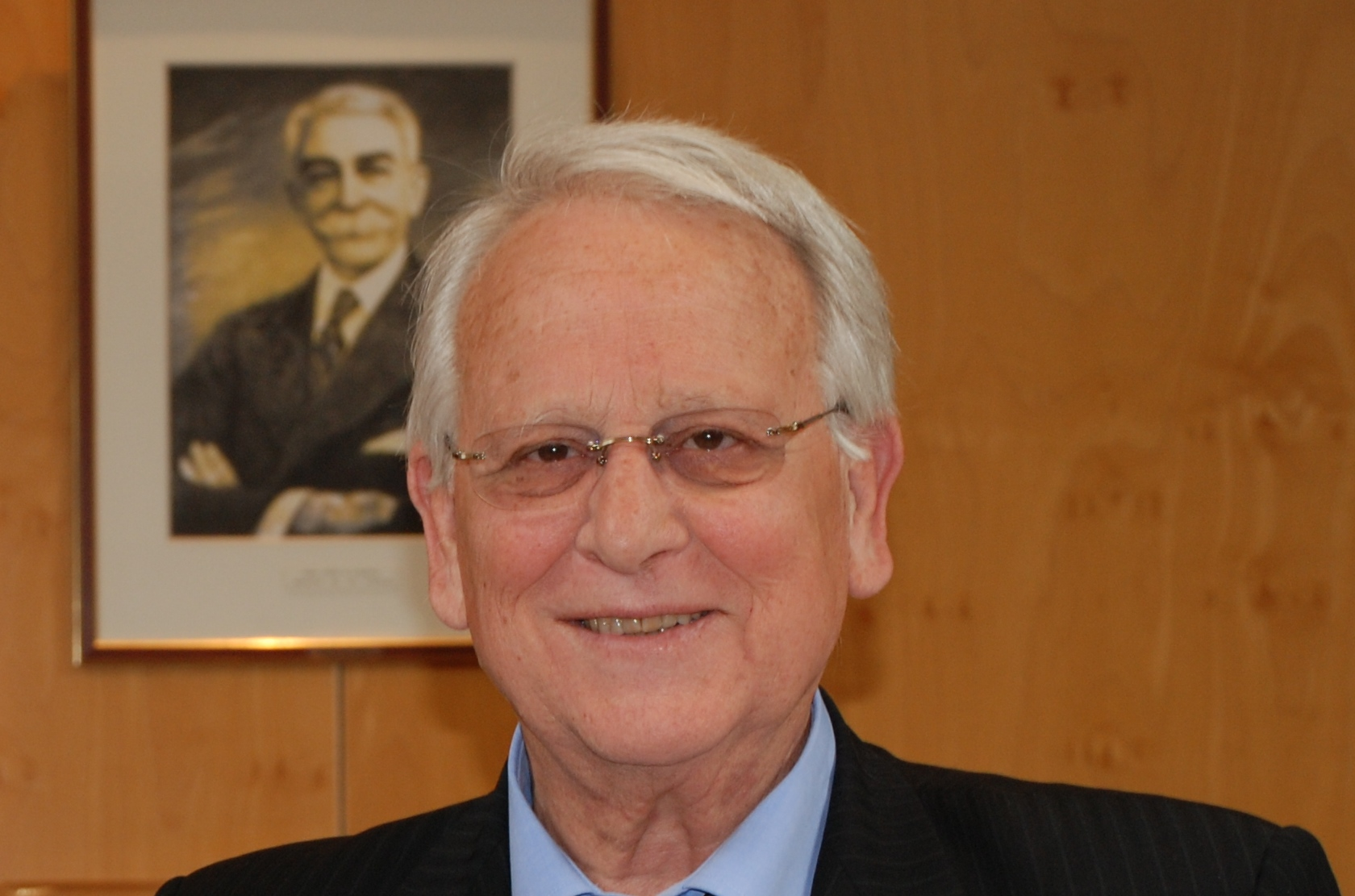
Henri Sérandour

Henri Sérandour (April 15, 1937 in Le Mans – November 12, 2009 in Dinard) was a former international water polo player. He was a past president of the French National Olympic Committee (CNOSF) during 16 years (1993-2009) and from 2000 to 2007, a member of the International Olympic Committee.
