= XL Airways France =

French airline

IATA	ICAO	Call sign
SE	XLF	STARWAY
- Founded: August 1995; 30 years ago (as Star Airlines)
- Commenced operations: 22 December 1995; 30 years ago
- Ceased operations: 23 September 2019; 6 years ago
- Operating bases: Paris–Charles de Gaulle
- Fleet size: 3
- Destinations: 16
- Parent company: ALMC hf
- Headquarters: Tremblay-en-France, Seine-Saint-Denis, Île-de-France, France
- Website: xl.fr

XL Airways France was a French airline with its head offices on the grounds of Paris-Charles de Gaulle Airport. It operated scheduled flights mainly to long-haul destinations in Africa, the Middle East, the United States and the Caribbean as well as charter flights to medium-haul destinations in the Mediterranean, mostly out of Charles de Gaulle Airport. On 19 September 2019, XL Airways announced the suspension of all flights as of 23 September; ticket sales ceased immediately and the company was placed under legal receivership and subsequently wound up. With the closure of the airline, it joined its sister airlines XL Airways UK and XL Airways Germany, both of which were also defunct, ending the use of the XL Airways brand.

== History ==
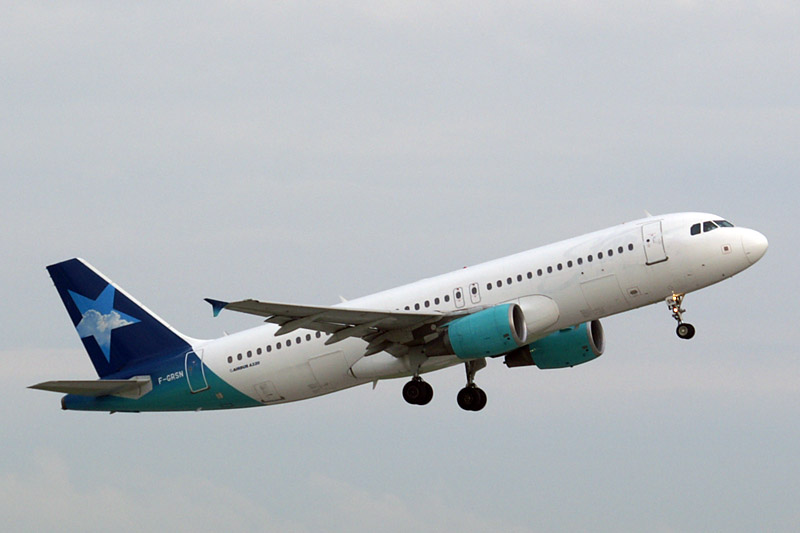
A Star Airlines Airbus A320-200 operating for Germanwings in 2006

The airline was founded by Cédric Pastour in August 1995 as Société de Transport Aérien Régional and was trading under Star Europe. In October 1997 it changed its trading name to Star Airlines. On 23 November 2006 the airline changed its name to XL Airways France. On 12 September 2008, parent XL Leisure was about to declare bankruptcy. The airline was then bought by Straumur Investment Bank (later ALMC hf).

On 19 September 2019, XL Airways was placed under legal receivership due to financial difficulties. Ticket sales ceased immediately, and flights were suspended from 23 September. Negotiations with potential buyers had been under way for over a year, and the search for a new buyer continued under the auspices of the commercial court. Only one formal bid was received by the deadline of 4 October – from Gérard Houa, former minority shareholder of Aigle Azur, who proposed to take over two of XL Airways' four planes and 48% of its 570 staff – but the court deemed that the guarantees were insufficient and ordered the liquidation of the company. In January 2020, the airline's remaining assets were auctioned off; the company's brand names and domain names were sold to an unnamed bidder for €686,400, leaving open the possibility of the name being revived.

== Corporate affairs ==
XL Airways's head office is in the Bâtiment Mars in Continental Square II on the grounds of Charles de Gaulle Airport and in the commune of Tremblay-en-France. The airline's head office was originally in the Immeuble Horizon facility in Noisy-le-Grand, in the Marne-la-Vallée development. Cédric Pastour, the founder of the airline, said that the company chose the Noisy site because the airline did not yet know which airport, Charles de Gaulle Airport or Orly Airport, would serve as the airline's base, and that the Noisy site was equidistant to both airports. Pastour added that the Noisy site had access to the A4 and the A86 autoroutes and was close to the Francilienne, and that the costs in the Noisy area were lower than the costs in the airport area.

== Destinations ==
XL Airways France flew to the following destinations (as of June 2019):

Country	City	IATA	ICAO	Airport	Notes	Refs
China	Jinan	TNA	ZSJN	Jinan Yaoqiang International Airport		
Cuba	Varadero	VRA	MUVR	Juan Gualberto Gómez Airport		
Dominican Republic	Punta Cana	PUJ	MDPC	Punta Cana International Airport		
France	Lyon	LYS	LFLL	Lyon–Saint-Exupéry Airport		
France	Marseille	MRS	LFML	Marseille Provence Airport		
France	Nantes	NTE	LFRS	Nantes Atlantique Airport		
France	Paris	CDG	LFPG	Charles de Gaulle Airport	Base	
Guadeloupe	Pointe-à-Pitre	PTP	TFFR	Pointe-à-Pitre International Airport		
Israel	Tel Aviv	TLV	LLBG	Ben Gurion Airport	Seasonal	
Martinique	Fort-de-France	FDF	TFFF	Martinique Aimé Césaire International Airport		
Mexico	Cancún	CUN	MMUN	Cancún International Airport		
Réunion	Saint-Denis	RUN	FMEE	Roland Garros Airport		
United States	Los Angeles	LAX	KLAX	Los Angeles International Airport	Seasonal	
United States	Miami	MIA	KMIA	Miami International Airport	Seasonal	
United States	New York City	EWR	KEWR	Newark Liberty International Airport		
United States	San Francisco	SFO	KSFO	San Francisco International Airport	Seasonal	

== Fleet ==
=== Fleet at airline's closing ===
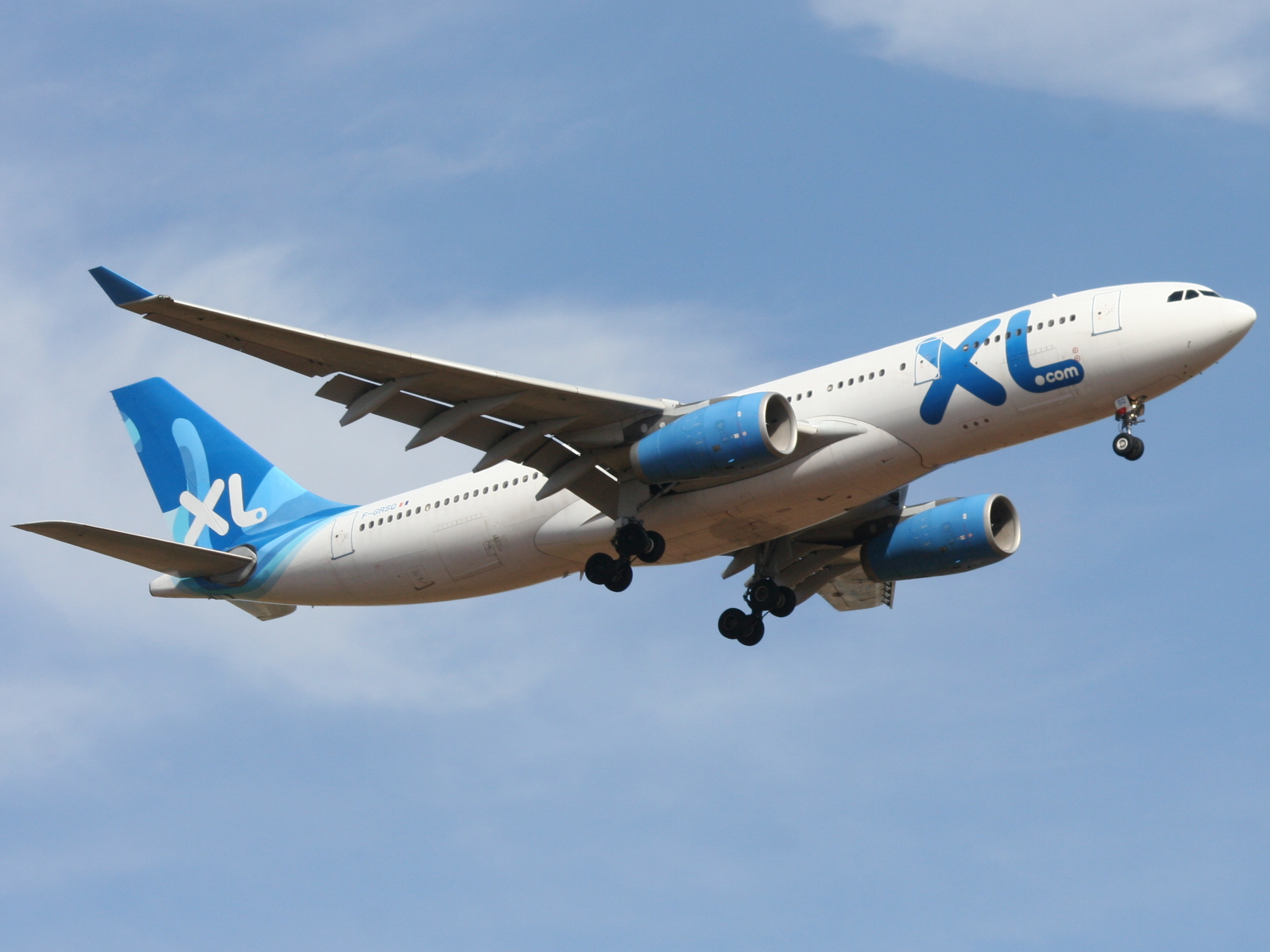
XL Airways France Airbus A330-200 landing at Ben Gurion Airport in 2015

At the time of closure, the XL Airways France fleet consisted of the following aircraft:

XL Airways France fleet
Aircraft	In service	Orders	Passengers			Notes
Aircraft	In service	Orders	J	Y	Total	Notes
Airbus A330-200	3	—	21	343	364	
Airbus A330-900	—	2	TBA			Deliveries would have begun in 2020.
Total	3	2				

=== Formerly operated ===
XL Airways France previously operated the following aircraft types:

XL Airways France historical fleet
Aircraft	Total	Introduced	Retired	Notes
Airbus A310-300	1	2005	2006	Leased from Air Atlanta Icelandic.
Airbus A320-200	11	1997	2013	
Airbus A330-300	1	2010	2010	Leased from Iberworld.
Airbus A330-300	2	2011	2012	Leased from Orbest and Orbest Orizonia Airlines.
Airbus A330-300	3	2014	2019	
Airbus A340-300	1	2014	2014	Leased from Hi Fly.
Boeing 737-300	1	1995	1996	
Boeing 737-400	2	1996	1997	Sold to Jet Airways.
Boeing 737-800	1	2007	2007	Leased from XL Airways Germany.
Boeing 737-800	5	2008	2016	

== Cabin and service ==
XL Airways France's Airbus A330s were configured entirely with Economy class seating mostly in a 3-3-3 layout, with some rows toward the rear of the aircraft configured in a 2-3-2 layout. A complimentary hot meal was served on all long-haul flights, with an additional breakfast or light meal served depending on flight length. Additional snacks and beverages were available for purchase. Comfort kits consisting of various amenities including a blanket and inflatable neck pillow were also available for purchase.

Inflight entertainment was available both through overhead screens on a running schedule, and on-demand streaming to personal electronic devices via XL Cloud, the airline's wireless streaming entertainment portal. Through XL Cloud, a selection of movies, TV shows, documentaries, and other digital media were available for free, as well as a live inflight map and instant messaging between passengers, however Internet access was not provided through the portal. An extended, premium selection of high definition movies and digital media was available for an all-inclusive fee. In addition, paid rental of virtual reality headsets equipped with noise-cancelling headphones and a selection of movies in 2D and 3D was also available for the duration of the flight.

== See also ==
- List of defunct airlines of France
