= Canet-en-Roussillon =

Canet-en-Roussillon Canet de Rosselló (Catalan)
- Commune
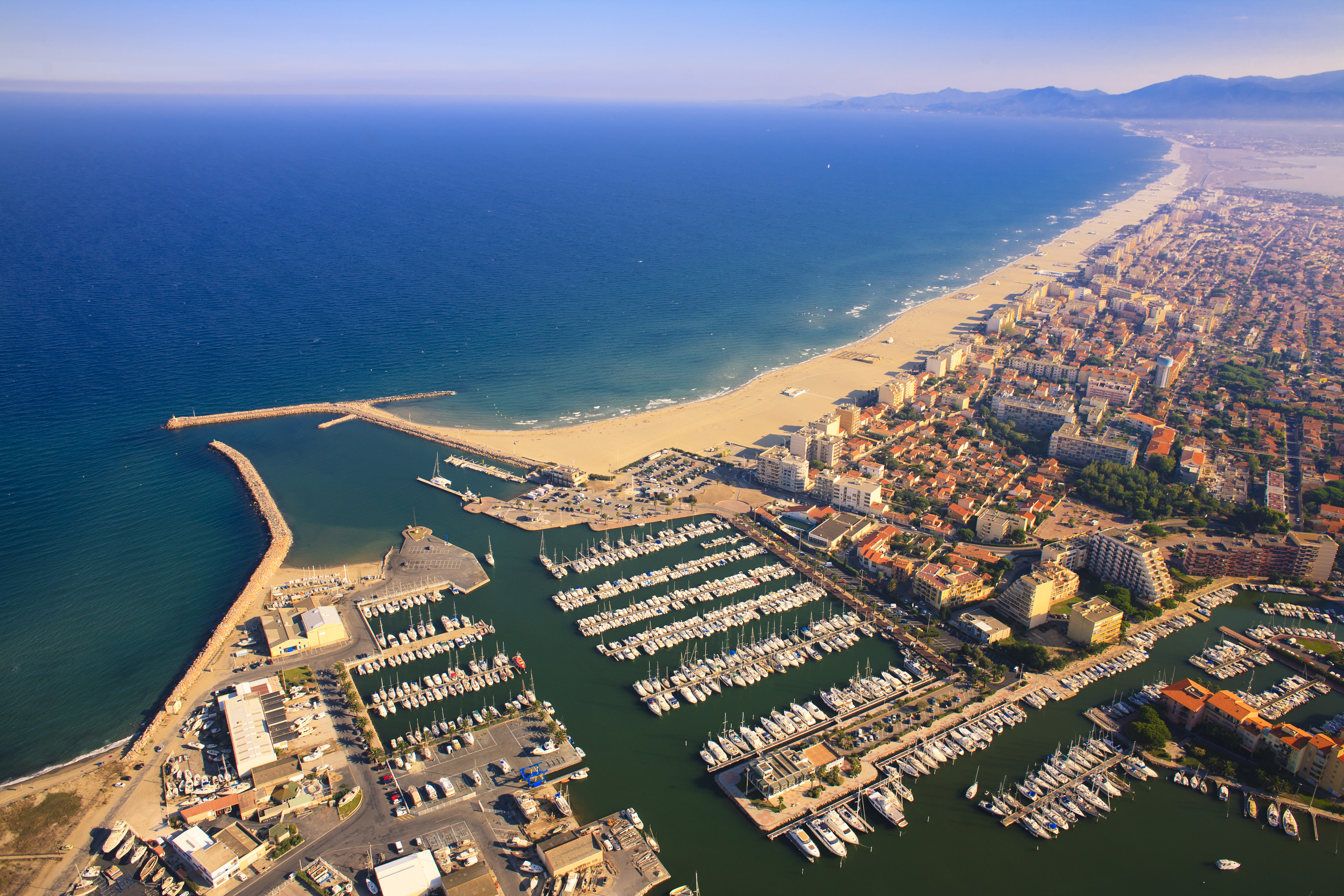
- Aerial view of the port and the sea front at Canet-en-Roussillon

- Coat of arms
- Location of Canet-en-Roussillon
- Location within France Location within Occitanie
- Coordinates: 42°42′24″N 3°00′28″E
- Country: France
- Region: Occitania
- Department: Pyrénées-Orientales
- Arrondissement: Perpignan
- Canton: La Côte Sableuse
- Intercommunality: Perpignan Méditerranée Métropole

Government
  - Mayor (2026–32): Stéphane Loda
- Area^{1}: 30.22 km^{2} (11.67 sq mi)
- Elevation: 6 m (20 ft)
- Highest elevation: 37 m (121 ft)
- Lowest elevation: 0 m (0 ft)
- Population (2023): 13,227
  - Density: 437.7/km^{2} (1,134/sq mi)
- Demonym(s): canétois (fr) canetenc, canetaire (ca)
- Time zone: UTC+01:00 (CET)
  - Summer (DST): UTC+02:00 (CEST)
- INSEE/Postal code: 66037 /66140
- ^{1} French Land Register data, which excludes lakes, ponds, glaciers > 1 km^{2} (0.386 sq mi or 247 acres) and river estuaries.

Canet-en-Roussillon (French pronunciation: [kane ɑ̃ ʁusijɔ̃]; Catalan: Canet de Rosselló, [kəˈnɛt ˈde rusəˈʎo]; Occitan: Canet de Rosselhon, [kaˈnet de ruseˈʎu]) is a commune and town in the French department of the Pyrénées-Orientales, administrative region of Occitania.

== Geography ==
Canet-en-Roussillon is located in the canton of La Côte Sableuse and in the arrondissement of Perpignan, 9.4 km (5.8 mi) to the east of Perpignan.

It is part of the Northern Catalan comarca of Rosselló.

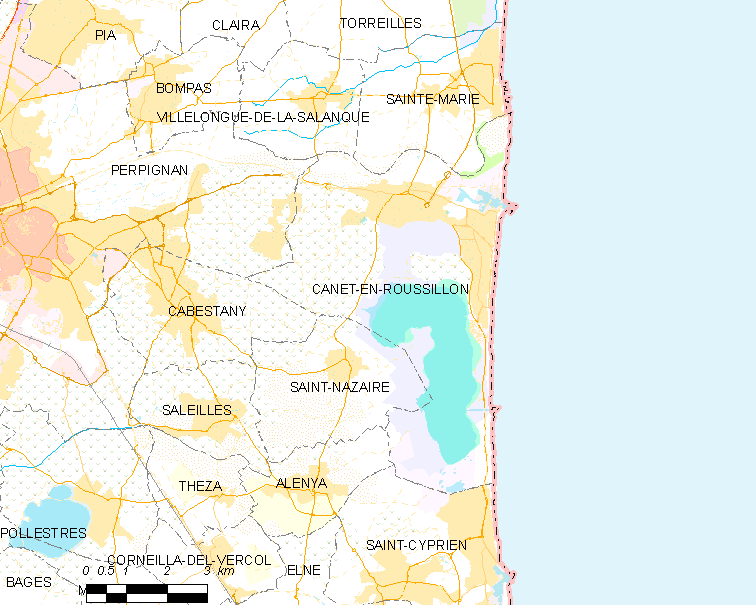
Map of Canet-en-Roussillon and its surrounding communes

== History ==
The city walls were destroyed in the 19th century.

With the development of sea bathing, the first beach settlement for bathers of the coast of Pyrénées-Orientales was created by Louise Lombard in 1849. As early as 1854 municipal laws were established regulating types of bathing suits and separating sea bathing zones for men and women.

== Government and politics ==
=== Mayors ===
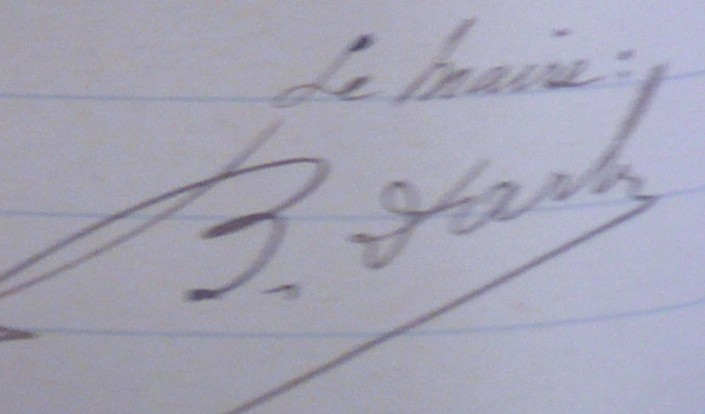
Signature of mayor Basile Darbon in 1910.

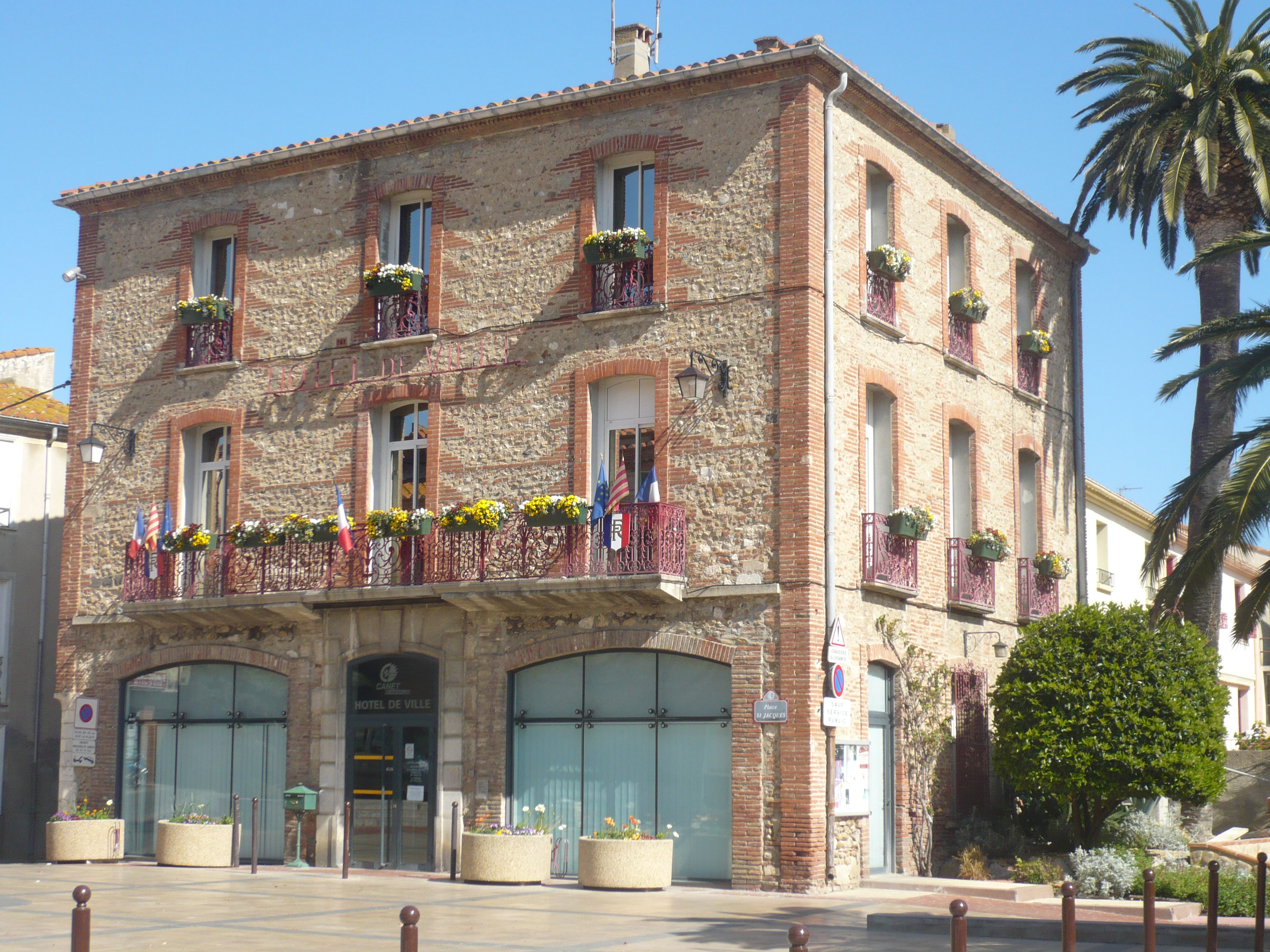
The town hall.

Mayor	Term start	Term end	Party
Joseph Cassanyes	1790	1792	
Jacques Bonet	1792	1795	
Jacques Cassanyes	1796	1797	
Julien Canal	1798	1798	
Jacques Cassanyes	1799	1800	
Jacques Bonet	1800	1813	
Joseph Cassanyes	February 1813	28 October 1814	
Saturnin Cargoles	1814	1826	
Antoine Gaux	1826	1831	
Joseph Cassanyes Jr.	1831	1848	
Julien Canal Jr.	March 1848	June 1848	Temporary Mayor
Pierre Roger	June 1848	September 1848	Temporary Mayor
Joseph Cassanyes	September 1848	August 1851	
Julien Canal	August 1851	December 1851	Temporary Mayor
Julien Canal	1851	1865	
Jean Bartissol	1865	September 1870	
Michel Pages	September 1870	December 1870	
Joseph Berga	1870	1874	
Côme Roger	1874	1881	
Jean Lafon	1881	1890	
Jacques Xamma	1891	1892	
Henri Castany	1892	1904	
Basile Darbon	1904	May 1912	
Isidore Boutet	May 1912	1918	
François Alies	1918	1919	
Joseph Lafon	1920	1925	
Jacques Xamma	1925	1930	
Joseph Lafon	1929	1930	
Gabriel Henric	1930	1941	
Désiré Riu	1941	1943	
Pierre Fourcade	1943	1944	
Gabriel Henric	1944	1947	
Joseph Pagès	1947	1950	
François Moudat	1950	1965	
Christian Brignieu	1965	1966	
François Moudat	1966	1971	
Jacques Coupet	1971	1989	
Arlette Franco	1989	2010	UMP
Bernard Dupont	2010	2020	UMP
Stéphane Loda	2020	incumbent	DVD

=== International relations ===
Canet-en-Roussillon is twinned with:

- (Republic of Ireland) Maynooth, Ireland

== Population ==
Historical population

Year	Pop.	±% p.a.
1793	225	—
1800	281	+3.23%
1806	233	−3.07%
1821	365	+3.04%
1831	384	+0.51%
1836	388	+0.21%
1841	405	+0.86%
1846	466	+2.85%
1851	509	+1.78%
1856	498	−0.44%
1861	524	+1.02%
1866	612	+3.15%
1872	662	+1.32%

Year	Pop.	±% p.a.
1876	754	+3.31%
1881	806	+1.34%
1886	887	+1.93%
1891	914	+0.60%
1896	1,012	+2.06%
1901	1,026	+0.28%
1906	1,102	+1.44%
1911	1,215	+1.97%
1921	1,226	+0.09%
1926	1,230	+0.07%
1931	1,199	−0.51%
1936	1,238	+0.64%
1946	1,213	−0.20%

Year	Pop.	±% p.a.
1954	1,853	+5.44%
1962	2,646	+4.55%
1968	3,658	+5.55%
1975	4,356	+2.53%
1982	6,030	+4.76%
1990	7,575	+2.89%
1999	10,182	+3.34%
2007	12,164	+2.25%
2012	12,602	+0.71%
2017	12,130	−0.76%
2023	13,227	+1.45%

Source: EHESS and INSEE (1968-2023)

== Sites of interest ==
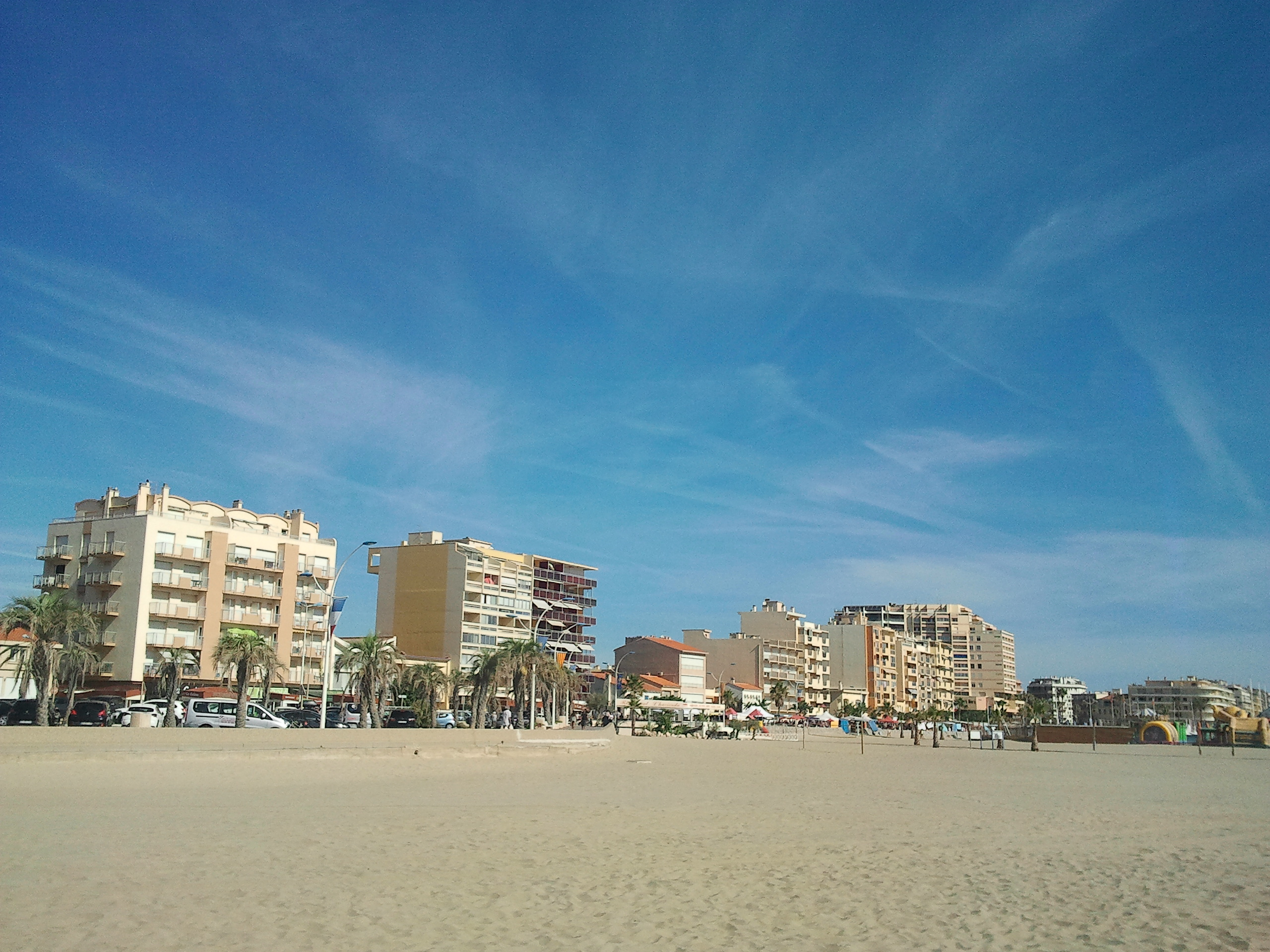
The sea front and the beach at Canet-en-Roussillon

- The medieval castle;
- The Saint-James church;
- The Château de l'Esparrou, a 19th c. manor;
- The old village;
- Canet-Saint-Nazaire lake;
- The sea front.

== Notable people ==
- Arlette Franco (1939-2010), mayor of Canet-en-Roussillon, deputy to the National Assembly of France and vice-president of the French Swimming Federation.
- Marc Fontan (1956-), motorcycle road racer born in Canet-en-Roussillon.

== See also ==
- Communes of the Pyrénées-Orientales department
- Gare de Perpignan murders - a victim was found in Canet-en-Roussillon.
- XL Airways Germany Flight 888T - an air crash that happened 7 kilometers from the commune.
