= XL Airways Germany =

German airline

IATA	ICAO	Call sign
X4	GXL	STARDUST
- Founded: 3 May 2006; 20 years ago (as Star XL German Airlines)
- Ceased operations: 3 January 2013; 13 years ago
- Operating bases: Frankfurt; Hannover
- Fleet size: 4
- Parent company: ALMC hf
- Headquarters: Mörfelden-Walldorf, Germany
- Key people: Bertolt Flick (CEO)
- Website: xlairways.de

XL Airways Germany GmbH was a German charter airline headquartered in Mörfelden-Walldorf, Hesse, operating charter and ad-hoc lease services, mostly out of Frankfurt Airport. The airline belonged, together with now defunct XL Airways France, to ALMC hf (formerly Straumur Investment Bank) from Iceland.

== History ==
The airline was founded as Star XL German Airlines by Eimskip from Iceland and received its air Operator's Certificate on 3 May 2006. On 30 October of the same year, the Avion leisure business was bought out and re-organized by the XL Leisure Group, resulting in the airline changing its name to XL Airways Germany.

On 11 September 2008, BBC News Channel reported that XL Leisure Group had filed for administration due to rising fuel prices, although initially Simon Calder confirmed the group's website was still taking bookings, the group folded the next morning. Operations of the German and French airline subsidiaries were not affected, however. On 12 September 2008, Straumur Investment Bank acquired XL Airways Germany and its French sister company, XL Airways France.

The company filed for bankruptcy on 27 December 2012; operations for the winter season had already been suspended on 14 December. The company officially closed on 3 January 2013.

== Destinations ==
XL Airways Germany served the following destinations in December 2012:

Country	City	IATA	ICAO	Airport	Notes	Refs
Egypt	Hurghada	HRG	HEGN	Hurghada International Airport	Seasonal	
Egypt	Sharm el-Sheikh	SSH	HESH	Sharm El Sheikh International Airport	Seasonal	
Germany	Cologne/Bonn	CGN	EDDK	Cologne Bonn Airport		
Germany	Düsseldorf	DUS	EDDL	Düsseldorf Airport		
Germany	Erfurt	ERG	EDDE	Erfurt–Weimar Airport		
Germany	Frankfurt	FRA	EDDF	Frankfurt Airport	Base	
Germany	Hahn	HHN	EDFH	Frankfurt–Hahn Airport		
Germany	Hamburg	HAM	EDDH	Hamburg Airport		
Germany	Hanover	HAJ	EDDV	Hannover Airport	Base	
Germany	Leipzig/Halle	LEJ	EDDP	Leipzig/Halle Airport		
Germany	Munich	MUC	EDDM	Munich Airport		
Germany	Münster/Osnabrück	FMO	EDDG	Münster Osnabrück Airport		
Germany	Nuremberg	NUE	EDDN	Nuremberg Airport		
Germany	Paderborn	PAD	EDLP	Paderborn Lippstadt Airport		
Germany	Saarbrücken	SCN	EDDR	Saarbrücken Airport		
Germany	Stuttgart	STR	EDDS	Stuttgart Airport		
Greece	Heraklion	HER	LGIR	Heraklion International Airport		
Kosovo	Pristina	PRN	BKPR	Pristina International Airport		
North Macedonia	Skopje	SKP	LWSK	Skopje International Airport		
Morocco	Marrakesh	RAK	GMMX	Marrakesh Menara Airport		
Portugal	Faro	FAO	LPFR	Faro Airport		
Spain	Fuerteventura	FUE	GCFV	Fuerteventura Airport		
Spain	Menorca	MAH	LEMH	Menorca Airport		
Tunisia	Enfidha	NBE	DTNH	Enfidha–Hammamet International Airport		
Turkey	Adana	ADA	LTAF	Adana Şakirpaşa Airport		
Turkey	Antalya	AYT	LTAI	Antalya Airport	Seasonal	
Turkey	Elazığ	EZS	LTCA	Elazığ Airport	Seasonal	
Turkey	Gaziantep	GZT	LTAJ	Oğuzeli Airport	Seasonal	
Turkey	Kayseri	ASR	LTAU	Erkilet International Airport		
Turkey	Malatya	MLX	LTAT	Malatya Erhaç Airport		
Turkey	Samsun	SZF	LTFH	Samsun-Çarşamba Airport		
Turkey	Trabzon	TZX	LTCG	Trabzon Airport		

== Fleet ==
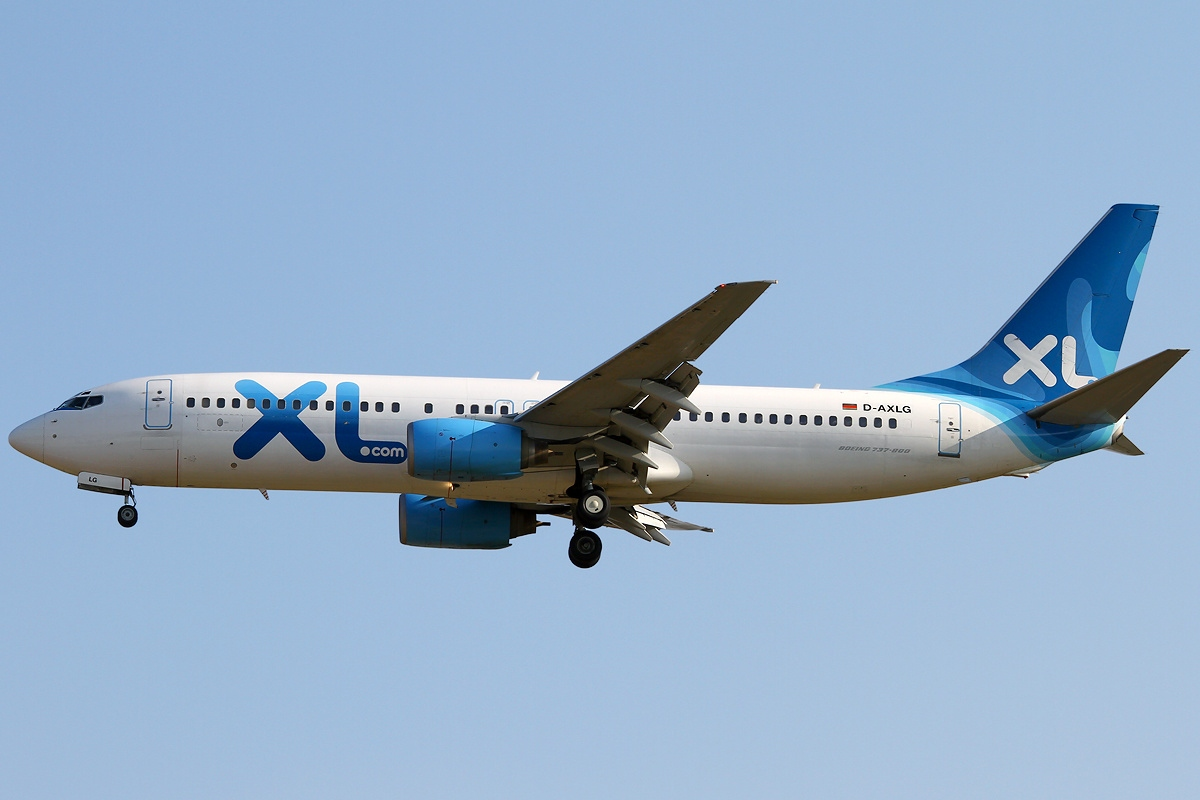
XL Airways Germany Boeing 737-800

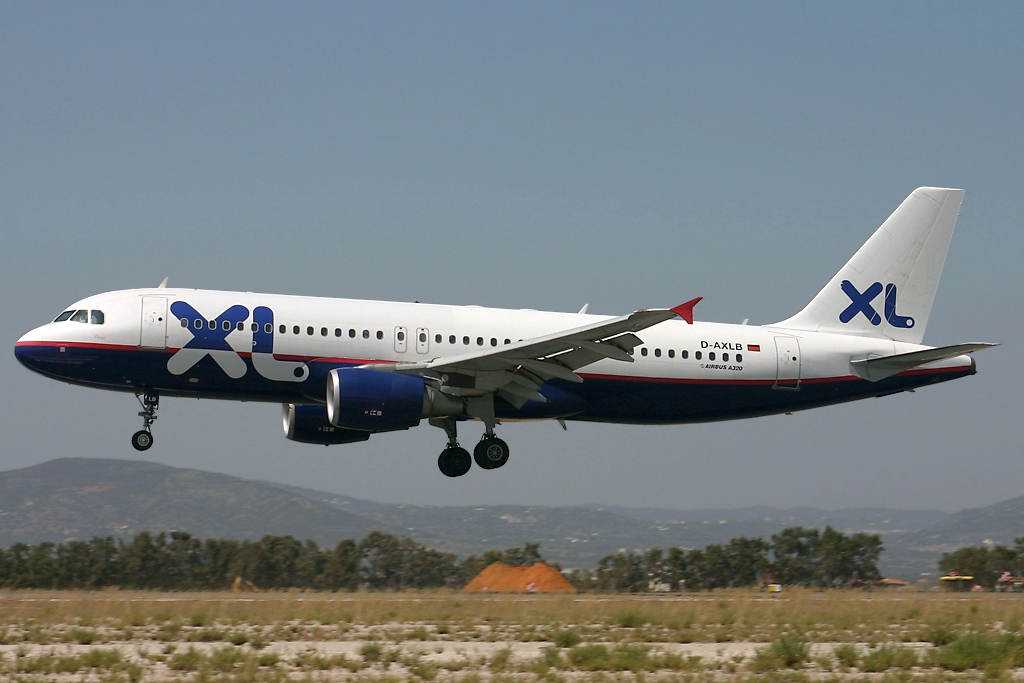
XL Airways Germany Airbus A320-200

=== Fleet at airline's closing ===
As of December 2012, the XL Airways Germany fleet consisted of the following aircraft:

Aircraft	In service	Orders	Passengers	Notes
Boeing 737-800	4	—	189	
Total	4	—		

=== Former Aircraft ===
Previously, the fleet consisted of the following aircraft:

Aircraft	Total	Introduced	Retired	Notes
Airbus A320-200	4	2006	2008	2 leased from USA3000 Airlines; 1 leased from Air New Zealand

== Accidents and incidents ==
- On 27 November 2008, while executing XL Airways Germany Flight 888T, an Airbus A320-200 registered to XL Airways Germany crashed into the Mediterranean Sea near Canet-en-Roussillon on the French coast. The plane was owned by Air New Zealand and leased to XL Airways Germany registered as D-AXLA (formerly ZK-OJL), and was undertaking a technical flight immediately prior to a scheduled handover back to Air New Zealand. At the time of the accident, the plane was painted in Air New Zealand livery. All seven people on board — two Germans (captain Norbert Kaeppel and first officer Theodore Ketzer from XL Airways) and five New Zealanders (one pilot, three aircraft engineers and one member of the Civil Aviation Authority of New Zealand) – were killed.

== See also ==
- List of defunct airlines of Germany
