= Björgólfur Guðmundsson =

Icelandic businessman (1941–2025)

- Born: 2 January 1941; Reykjavík, Iceland
- Died: 2 February 2025 (aged 84)
- Education: Verzlunarskóli Íslands
- Occupations: Chairman, Landsbanki (2003–08); Chairman, West Ham United (2007–09)
- Spouse: Margrét Þóra Hallgrímsson (m. 1963; died 2020)
- Children: Björgólfur Thor Björgólfsson

Björgólfur Guðmundsson (2 January 1941 – 2 February 2025) was an Icelandic businessman and chairman and owner of West Ham United. Björgólfur was Iceland's second businessman to be worth more than a billion dollars — his son, Björgólfur Thor Björgólfsson being the first. He was at one time the majority owner and chairman of the Icelandic bank Landsbanki, the second largest company in Iceland (subsequently nationalised). He was ranked by Forbes magazine in March 2008 as the 1014th-richest person in the world, with a net worth of $1.1 billion. In December of the same year Forbes revalued his net worth to $0, and on 31 July 2009 he was declared bankrupt by the Icelandic courts with debts of almost £500 million (96 billion ISK).

Björgólfur was described in an article written by Jamie Jackson of The Guardian as "a former footballer, furniture packer and law student, a recovering alcoholic of 30 years and an old-fashioned philanthropist". In the 1990s he was sentenced to 12 months in prison, suspended for two years, for bookkeeping offences, having faced around 450 charges. He went to Russia, remade his fortune and returned to Iceland, where he also had interests in shipping, publishing, food, communications and property.

== Early life and marriage ==
Björgólfur was born in Reykjavík, Iceland, to Guðmundur Pétur Ólafsson (1911–79), a driver, and Kristín Davíðsdóttir, growing up on Framnesvegur. Björgólfur had an elder brother, Davíð, and three sisters. By the account of Björgólfur's son, Björgólfur was from a working-class background, and his father Guðmundur was affected by a stroke around 1945.

The young Björgólfur graduated from the Commercial College of Iceland in 1962 and was an organiser of the Independence Party youth wing, described by Roger Boyes as 'a promising young man, handsome, clean-cut, with reasonable English and a smooth, reassuring manner'.

Accounts vary, but it has been claimed that in 1958 Björgólfur was asked by the family of Thor Philip Axel Jensen, Iceland's foremost businessman of the time, to accompany Hallgrímur Fr. Hallgrímsson to the US to bring back Hallgrímur's daughter Margrét Þóra Hallgrímsson, who had left her first marriage to Haukur Clausen to marry the American Nazi George Lincoln Rockwell. Björgólfur's son suggests, however, that the two met only after Þóra's return to Iceland following her split with Rockwell. Either way, Björgólfur married Þóra in 1963 and adopted her children by Clausen (Örn Friðrik, b. 1951) and Rockwell (Hallgrímur, b. 1954; Margrét, 1955–89; and Evelyn Bentína). The couple subsequently had a child of their own, Björgólfur Thor Björgólfsson (b. 1967).

From 1962 to 1977, Björgólfur was the founder and director of Dósagerðin hf.; from 1977 to 1986 he was the director of Hafskip, with further responsibilities for its various daughter companies in the Europe and the USA. During much of this period, Björgólfur was, in the estimation of his son Björgólfur Thor, 'a highly functional alcoholic', but went into rehab in Hazelden, Minnesota, in 1978 and did not drink thereafter.

== Hafskip affair ==
The shipping business Hafskip was the main competitor to Iceland's established shipping operator Eimskip (co-founded by the father of Björgólfur's wife). In Roger Boyes's account,

initially there was more than enough business for both shipping companies, transporting supplies to the U.S. base. But when an American company started to compete on the route, Hafskip floundered. Björgólfur borrowed to expand, but in the early 1980s—without a bank in his pocket or sophisticated financial instruments available—he struggled to keep the cash flow going. According to Illugi Jökulsson, who has written a book about the Hafskip affair, Björgólfur was suddenly undermined when his bank, Útvegsbankinn, declared his company in default on its loans.

Björgólfur was prosecuted for bookkeeping irregularities, receiving a twelve-month suspended jail sentence, but in Illugi Jökulsson's interpretation, this

was a crude act to dispose of an Eimskip rival (which later took on Hafskip’s ships). More, it was an attempt by the Progressive Party to profit from the downfall of a man who was so clearly aligned with the Independence Party'.

The affair had a considerable effect on Björgólfur and his son, and both at times portrayed their subsequent business activities as a way to take revenge on the people they saw as their persecutors and to regain their reputations. One of the avenues through which Björgólfur worked to restore his reputation in the years following the Hafskip affair was by starting a successful alcoholics' rehabilitation centre in Reykjavík.

From 1986 to 1991, Björgólfur was the director and owner of Icestar Ltd. in Copenhagen and a consultant on the shipping business for AMA Agencies in London.

== Beverage businessman in Saint Petersburg ==
In 1991, in the wake of the Hafskip affair, Björgólfur began running the brewery and soft drinks unit of Pharmaco, a pharmaceuticals group.

In the early 1990s Pharmaco was required to sell off its unneeded bottling machines, and Björgólfur took the opportunity, through a partner, Ingimar Haukur Ingimarsson, who was already based in St Petersburg, to co-found Bravo Brewery alongside Magnús Þorsteinsson (chairman of Avion Group) and Björgólfur's own son Björgólfur Thor. Notwithstanding legal wrangles with Ingimar Haukur, Bravo Brewery became a success.

The Icelandic businessmen, together with Russian partners, founded the bottling company Baltic Bottling Plant, which was sold to Pepsi. They moved to brewing and founded the brewing company Bravo International OOO in August 1996 which became Bravo International JSC in December 1997. Bravo Brewery became a success with the premium beer Botchkarov.

In 2005 an article in The Guardian noted that in the 1990s the three Icelandic businessmen "were not only ploughing money into the country but doing it in the city regarded as the Russian mafia capital. That investment was being made in the drinks sector, seen by the mafia as the industry of choice." In St. Petersburg, the Committee on External Economic Relations in Saint Petersburg's Mayor's office was responsible for foreigners in Saint Petersburg. The committee's chairman was Vladimir Putin. Competitors in the St. Petersburg brewing market faced problems. Ilya Weismann, deputy director of competing beverage company Baltic, was assassinated on 10 January 2000. Soon afterwards Baltic director general Aslanbek Chochiev was also assassinated. One competing St Petersburg brewery burned to the ground. Bravo, however, became the fastest growing brewery in Russia. Heineken bought the extraordinarily successful brewery for $400m in 2002 and Björgólfur returned to Iceland.

== The boom years: chairman of Landsbanki ==
Late in 2002, Björgólfur Thor Björgólfsson and Björgólfur Guðmundsson's holding company Samson ehf. gained 45% controlling share of Landsbanki, Iceland's second largest bank, for about 12.3 billion ISK in a controversial privatization. The board was announced in February 2003, with the chairman being Björgólfur Guðmundsson.

Björgólfur became famous and very popular in Iceland during this time as the country's leading philanthropist, both through the direct contributions of himself and his wife Þóra, and through contributions made by Landsbanki (where he started a special service with the tag "Give help to a good cause"): "dressed in his trademark pin-striped suits he came to be [...] loved by the public, and was for a while perhaps more influential in the island's cultural life than even the Minister of Culture, who in effect was downgraded to second fiddle in many opening ceremonies". Particularly major funding went to the National Theatre of Iceland for the building of a new stage; the Iceland Symphony Orchestra, which received ISK 25m for touring; the Listahátíð í Reykjavík; the Icelandic Opera for a staging of Tosca; the Reykjavík Menningarnótt; the Football Association of Iceland; Grafarvogskirkja; the Icelandic Literary Society; the University of Iceland; RÚV for domestic programming; the theatre group Vesturport; the University of Akureyri; 160 artists in Klink og Bank; and the artist Ólafur Elíasson. Particularly since the 2008 economic crash, however, it has been pointed out that by accident or design this massive patronage of the artistic and intellectual life of Iceland tended to silence critical commentary on the banking boom, helping to cause the collapse.

Björgólfur's use of sponsorship of the cultural sector to win public approval of himself and his businesses extended to buying influence in the media. In 2002, Björgólfur took a 68% in Iceland's biggest publisher, Edda. In 2005, Guðmund Magnússon published the book Thorsararnir, on the history of the descendants of Thor Jensen. The first version of the book included a chapter on Þóra's first marriage to Rockwell. The book was published by the press Edda, but Björgólfur, who owned the publisher, had the author change the text, and had the whole first print run destroyed. Moreover, he tried to buy the newspaper Dagblaðið-Vísir, which had discussed the matter, in order to close it down. Björgólfur did succeed in buying the country's only broadsheet newspaper, Morgunblaðið, along with the associated internet news portal mbl.is.

== The banking crisis, and personal bankruptcy ==
Björgólfur's chairmanship at Landsbanki ended when, on 7 October 2008, the Icelandic Financial Supervisory Authority (FME) decided to take over Landsbanki's operations, replacing its board of directors. After the almost total collapse of the Icelandic banking system in 2008, Björgólfur Guðmundsson was named throughout the Icelandic media as one of the main players behind the Icelandic economic disaster. Björgólfur declared his personal bankruptcy in 2009, owing $750m, $500m of which he owed to Landsbanki. This seems to have been the world's biggest recorded personal bankruptcy at the time. In 2010, Time magazine named Björgölfur as one of their hundred most influential people in the world for his role in the Icelandic crash.

== Other businesses 2002–2008 ==
Björgólfur was a keen football fan and led the consortium which bought the English Premier League football club West Ham United. He bought 90% of the club himself and became the club's Honorary Life President in June 2006 (alongside Eggert Magnússon, who became Chairman). In December 2007, Björgólfur bought out Eggert's residual 5% stake, and took over the chairman's role. On 8 June 2009, West Ham were taken over by asset management company CB Holding. Björgólfur and vice-chairman Ásgeir Friðgeirsson resigned from the club's board.

== Death ==
Björgólfur died on 2 February 2025, at the age of 84.

== Appearances in popular culture ==
- Björgólfur Guðmundsson is the model for the character Haraldur Rúriksson in Þráinn Bertelsson's 2004 Roman à clef, Dauðans óvissi tími.
- Björgólfur Guðmundsson is the inspiration for one of the principal characters of Bjarni Harðarson's satirical novel about the 2008–2012 Icelandic financial crisis, Sigurðar saga fóts: Íslensk riddarasaga, where his counterpart is Bjarnhéðinn 'kaupahéðinn' Jónsson.
