= Hafskip =

Hafskip (Icelandic pronunciation: [ˈhafˌscɪp], lit. 'Sea Ship') was Iceland's second-largest shipping line before its collapse which became a national scandal.

The firm had fallen deep into debt through its investment in new ships, intended to help the firm compete with Eimskip and American shipping firms in the transatlantic shipping trade. It was declared bankrupt on December 6, 1985; this led in turn to the collapse of its main lending bank, Útvegsbanki (the Fisheries Bank of Iceland). Partly because of Hafskip's ties to Iceland's finance minister Albert Guðmundsson, who was its former chairman and still a shareholder at the time of the firm's collapse, Hafskip's bankruptcy became a fuel for rival politicians, and ignited a criminal investigation which lasted six years.

Björgólfur Guðmundsson, Hafskip's managing director, and the Hafskip executives Páll Bragi Kristjónsson, Ragnar Kjartansson and the company's auditor, Helgi Magnússon, were detained and later charged with 450 criminal counts, from embezzlement to fraud. Björgólfur Guðmundsson was found guilty on five counts of minor bookkeeping offenses and sentenced to 12 months' probation.

There was also another scandal with the same company that happened in 1978. But the second incident was larger.

== See also ==
- Corporate scandal
- The MV Ranga, a ship chartered to Hafskip, but wrecked on the Irish coast in 1982
