= List of Icelandic billionaires by net worth =

This is a list of Icelandic billionaires based on an annual assessment of wealth and assets compiled and published by Forbes magazine in 2023.

== 2023 Icelandic billionaires list ==
| World Rank | Name | Citizenship | Net worth (USD) | Source of wealth |
|---|---|---|---|---|
| 1 | Thor Björgólfsson | Iceland | 2.5 billion | investments |

== See also ==
- The World's Billionaires
- List of countries by the number of billionaires
