= Goal difference =

Tiebreaker used to rank sport teams on equal points in a league competition

Goal difference, goal differential or points difference is a form of tiebreaker used to rank sport teams which finish on equal points in a league competition. Either "goal difference" or "points difference" is used, depending on whether matches are scored by goals (as in ice hockey and association football) or by points (as in rugby union and basketball).

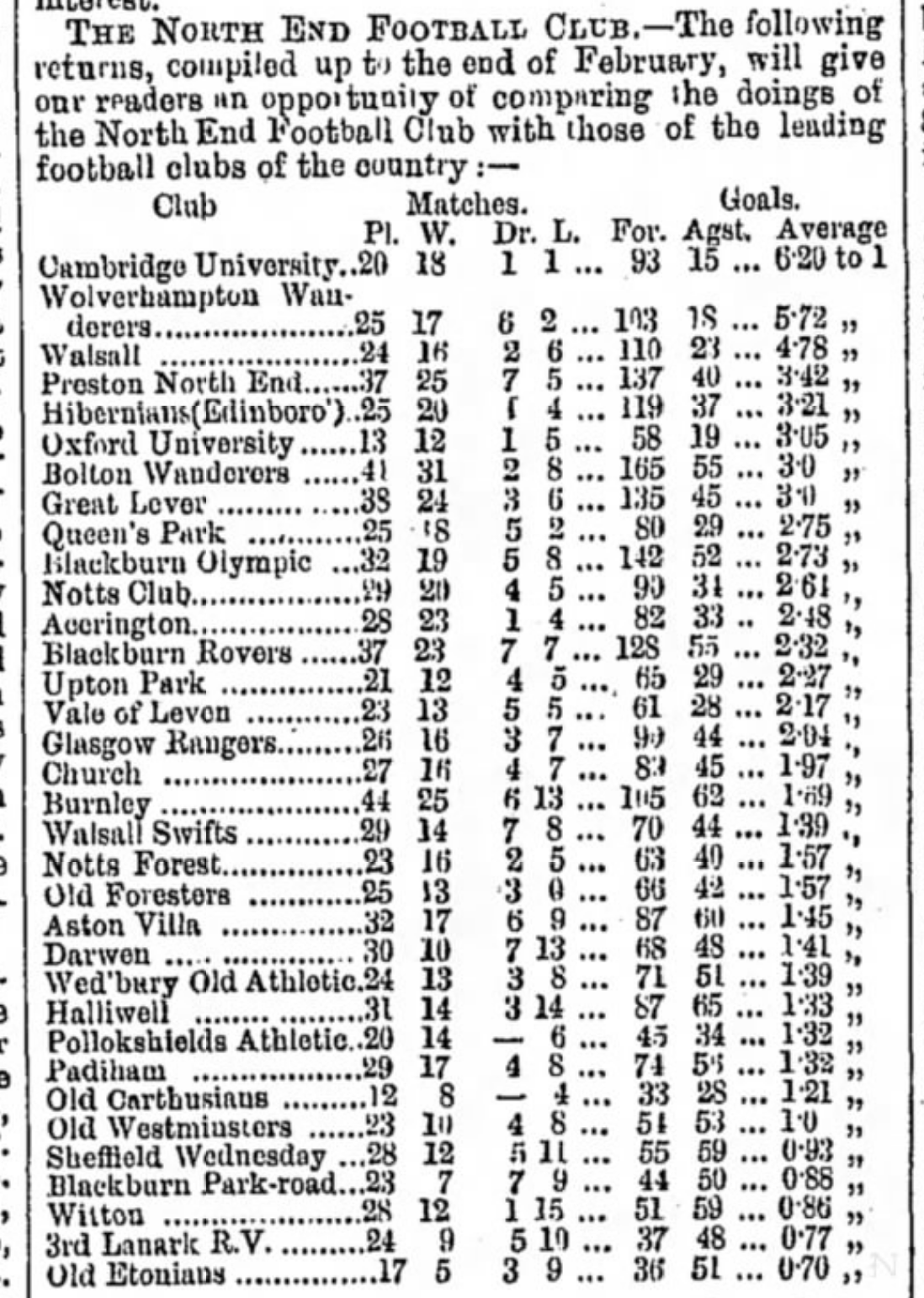
Early example of goal average being used to compare the performances of football clubs (March 1885)

Goal difference is calculated as the number of goals scored in all league matches minus the number of goals conceded, and is sometimes known simply as plus–minus. Association football was the first sport to use goal difference as a tiebreaker, at the 1970 FIFA World Cup, the rule was adopted by the Football League in England five years later. It has since spread to many other competitions, where it is typically used as either the first or, after tying teams' head-to-head records, second tiebreaker. Goal difference is zero sum, in that a gain for one team (+1) is exactly balanced by the loss for their opponent (–1). Therefore, the sum of the goal differences in a league table is always zero (provided the teams have only played each other).

Goal difference has often replaced the older goal average, or goal ratio. Goal average is the number of goals scored divided by the number of goals conceded, and is therefore a dimensionless quantity. It was replaced by goal difference, which was thought to encourage more attacking play, encouraging teams to score more goals (or points) as opposed to defending against conceding. However a form of goal average is still used as a tiebreaker in Australian Rules football, where it is referred to as "percentage". This is calculated as points scored divided by points conceded, and the result then multiplied by 100.

If two or more teams' total points scored and goal differences are both equal, then often goals scored is used as a further tiebreaker, with the team scoring the most goals winning. After this a variety of other tiebreakers may be used.

== Goal difference v. goal average ==
Suppose three teams are in a league and have played against each other once each, with scores as follows:

Team A	3–0	Team B

Team B	6–0	Team C

Team A	0–1	Team C

Under goal average, Team A would win:

Pos	Team	Pld	W	D	L	GF	GA	GR	Pts
1	Team A	2	1	0	1	3	1	3.000	3
2	Team B	2	1	0	1	6	3	2.000	3
3	Team C	2	1	0	1	1	6	0.167	3

Under goal difference, Team B would win:

Pos	Team	Pld	W	D	L	GF	GA	GD	Pts
1	Team B	2	1	0	1	6	3	+3	3
2	Team A	2	1	0	1	3	1	+2	3
3	Team C	2	1	0	1	1	6	−5	3

Goal average was replaced by goal difference due to the former's encouragement of lower-scoring games. For example, a team that scores 70 while conceding 40 would have a lesser goal average (1.750) than another team that scores 69 while conceding 39 (1.769). Or, for the team that has scored 70 while conceding 40, conceding another would reduce the goal average by 0.043 (to 1.707), whereas scoring another would increase it by only 0.025 (to 1.775), making not conceding much more important than scoring again.

The opposite effect occurs when the number of goals scored is less than the number of goals conceded, with goal difference encouraging more defensive play for teams in relegation battles. Consider a team that scores 10 while conceding 20. Under goal difference, an extra goal scored cancels out an extra goal conceded. However, under goal average, an extra goal would increase the goal average by 0.05, while conceding would reduce it by only 0.024.

Another issue with goal average is that, if a team has conceded no goals (e.g. England in the 1966 FIFA World Cup Group 1), the value cannot be calculated, as division by zero is undefined.

== Titles decided on goal difference ==
=== Netherlands top-flight ===
==== 2007, PSV Eindhoven and Ajax ====
Standings after 33 matches
Pos	Team	Pld	W	D	L	GF	GA	GD	Pts
1	AZ Alkmaar	33	21	9	3	81	28	+53	72
2	Ajax	33	22	6	5	82	35	+47	72
3	PSV Eindhoven	33	22	6	5	70	24	+46	72

Source: 2006–07 Eredivisie

Heading into the final day of the 2006–07 Eredivisie season, three teams were still in contention to win the title, and with it a guaranteed place in the 2007–08 UEFA Champions League. PSV, looking to win their third straight league title, was the only one of the three to play its final match at home, against Vitesse Arnhem. Ajax, looking to win their first title since 2004, traveled to Willem II, while AZ faced Excelsior looking to win its first league title since 1981, after finishing in the top three in the previous two seasons.

These final matches were played on 29 April 2007. AZ struggled against Excelsior (who would have to go through a relegation play-off after the end of the game) as they played almost 72 minutes of the match with only 10 men, as goalkeeper Boy Waterman was red-carded in the 18th minute. AZ came from behind twice, with Danny Koevermans tying the match in the 70th minute with his 22nd goal of the season. AZ had a chance to take the lead after its numerical disadvantage was leveled as Excelsior's Rene van Dieren was sent off for yellow card accumulation. AZ never took advantage and a goal from Johan Voskamp in the 90th minute gave Excelsior a shock 3–2 win.

Meanwhile, in Tilburg, Ajax took the lead in the 18th minute with a goal from Urby Emanuelson. Ajax added a second goal in the 69th minute as Klaas-Jan Huntelaar scored his 21st goal of the season.

Meanwhile, PSV scored twice in the first 10 minutes, but gave up a goal three minutes later and led only 2–1 at half-time. In the second half, Ibrahim Afellay scored in the 58th minute before another goal from Jefferson Farfan made the score 4–1 to PSV.

Following Huntelaar's 69th-minute goal, PSV and Ajax were level on points and goal difference, but Ajax had a superior goals scored. But in the 77th minute, Philip Cocu put PSV up 5–1 and the team was up on goal difference (+50 to Ajax's +49). The scores stayed that way at full time, and so PSV won the 2006–07 Eredivisie in one of the most exciting finishes to a season in recent memory.

2006–07 Eredivisie final standings
Pos	Team	Pld	W	D	L	GF	GA	GD	Pts
1	PSV Eindhoven	34	23	6	5	75	25	+50	75
2	Ajax	34	23	6	5	84	35	+49	75
3	AZ Alkmaar	34	21	9	4	83	31	+52	72

Source: 2006–07 Eredivisie

=== Iceland top-flight ===
==== 2010, Breiðablik UBK, ÍBV and FH Hafnarfjörður ====
The 2010 Úrvalsdeild season concluded on 25 September 2010, and three teams were still in contention to win the league title. Leading the table was Breiðablik, based in Kópavogur, who knew that a win would give them their first ever league title. Trailing one point behind were ÍBV from Vestmannaeyjar, who were looking to win their fourth league title, but its first since 1998. In third place were two-time defending champions FH Hafnarfjörður|FH]], looking to win the league title, but trailing Breiðablik by only two points.

Breiðablik traveled to Stjarnan and were held to a scoreless draw, but would get encouraging news. Playing their final game at Keflavík, ÍBV were losing 2–0 with 16 minutes remaining when Denis Sytnik scored for ÍBV to cut the deficit to 2–1. But two late goals from Keflavík's Magnús Þorsteinsson and Bojan Ljubicic denied ÍBV a chance to overtake Breiðablik, as ÍBV lost to Keflavík by 4–1.

Meanwhile, a draw opened the door for FH as they traveled to Reykjavík to face Fram needing to overturn an 11-goal difference. FH got two goals from Gunnar Kristjansson and a third from Atli Viðar Björnsson (which would tie him with two players for the league lead with 14 goals). However, the 3–0 victory was not enough to deny Breiðablik their first ever league title.

2010 Úrvalsdeild final standings
Pos	Team	Pld	W	D	L	GF	GA	GD	Pts
1	Breiðablik UBK	22	13	5	4	47	23	+24	44
2	FH Hafnarfjörður	22	13	5	4	48	31	+17	44
3	ÍBV	22	13	3	6	36	27	+9	42

Source: 2010 Úrvalsdeild

=== Hungary top-flight ===
==== 2014, Debreceni VSC and Győri ETO FC ====
Ahead of the final day of the 2013–14 Nemzeti Bajnokság I season, Debrecen was on course to win its 7th league title since 2005 as its closest competitor Győr had to overturn a 14-goal swing on the final matchday. Despite losing its season-finale 2–0 to Budapest Honved FC, Debrecen won the title as Győr only won 5–0 against already-relegated Mezőkövesd-Zsóry SE.

=== England top-flight ===
==== 2012, Manchester City and Manchester United ====
The 2011–12 Premier League was largely a two-horse race contested between Manchester City and Manchester United for most of the season, with both clubs finishing 19 points ahead of third-placed Arsenal. City and United went into their final matches of the season level on points, but with City in first-place due to a goal difference superior by +8. The final matches were relegation threatened Queens Park Rangers at home for City, and Sunderland away for United. City were strong favourites, with United's manager Alex Ferguson stating City would have to do 'something stupid' not to beat QPR.

A Manchester City win would guarantee the title due to a realistically unassailable superior goal difference. If not a win, then City just needed to match United's result at the Stadium of Light against Sunderland or have United lose against Sunderland. United scored in the 20th minute, winning 1–0. City scored two goals in injury time to come from behind and win 3–2.

==== 1989, Arsenal and Liverpool ====
Arsenal won the league championship on goals-scored, after finishing level on points and goal difference with Liverpool in the 1988–89 season. Arsenal defeated Liverpool 2–0 in the final game of the season to win the championship.

=== England lower division titles decided on goal difference ===
==== 1983–84, Second Division – Chelsea and Sheffield Wednesday ====
Chelsea 88 points and goal difference 50, Sheffield Wednesday 88 points and goal difference 38.

==== 1989–90, Second Division – Leeds United and Sheffield United ====
Leeds United 85 points and goal difference 27, Sheffield United 85 points and goal difference 20.

==== 1981–82, Third Division – Burnley and Carlisle United ====
Burnley 80 points and goal difference 21, Carlisle United 80 points and goal difference 15.

==== 2016–17, League Two – Portsmouth and Plymouth Argyle ====
Portsmouth 87 points and goal difference 39, Plymouth 87 points and goal difference 25.

==== 2021–22, League Two – Forest Green and Exeter City ====
Forest Green 84 points and goal difference 31, Exeter City 84 points and goal difference 24.

(N.B. In 1996–97, Wigan Athletic and Fulham finished level on 87 points at the top of the Third Division, but Wigan Athletic were awarded the championship on most goals scored, which was the first tie breaker in use in the Football League between 1992 and 1999, although Fulham had the greater goal difference. Coincidentally Brighton and Hove Albion avoided relegation from the same division on goals scored at the expense of Hereford United, although Hereford had the better goal difference. It reverted to the goal difference method from the start of the 1999–2000 season.)

==== 2024–25, Championship – Leeds United and Burnley ====
Leeds United and Burnley both finished on 100 points, with the title going to Leeds due to their superior goal difference.

=== Scotland ===
==== 1986, Premier Division – Hearts and Celtic ====
In 1986, Hearts lost 2–0 at Dundee on the final day of the season, which allowed Celtic to win the league championship on goal difference. Had the first tie-breaker been a goal average, Hearts would have won the championship.

==== 2003, Premier League – Old Firm ====
Rangers won the Scottish Premier League in 2003 on goal difference. In the final round of matches, Rangers played Dunfermline, while second-placed Celtic were playing at Kilmarnock. With Celtic and Rangers level on 94 points going into these matches, the Championship would be decided by which team, Celtic or Rangers, performed best during the final round of matches. If both teams won they would each finish on 97 points, and the League would be decided on goal difference. Rangers won 6–1 and Celtic won 4–0, which left Rangers with a goal difference of 73 (101 for and 28 against), and Celtic a goal difference of 72 (98 scored and 26 against) giving Rangers the title.

== Titles decided on goal average ==
=== England top-flight ===
==== 1924, First Division – Huddersfield Town and Cardiff City ====
In the 1923–24 Football League Championship, Huddersfield Town and Cardiff City both finished on 57 points. Huddersfield Town won the title with 60 goals for to 33 against, for an average of 1.818. Cardiff City's 61 to 34 gave 1.794. They would have been tied on goal difference but City would have won on goals scored.

==== 1950, First Division–Portsmouth-Wolverhampton Wanderers ====
In the 1949–50 Football League Championship, Portsmouth and Wolverhampton Wanderers both finished on 53 points. Portsmouth won the title with 74 goals for to 38 against, for an average of 1.947. Wolverhampton Wanderers 76 to 49 gave 1.551.

==== 1953, First Division – Arsenal and Preston North End ====
In the 1952–53 Football League Championship, Arsenal and Preston North End both finished on 54 points. Arsenal won the title with 97 goals for to 64 against, for an average of 1.516. Preston's 85 to 60 gave 1.417.

==== 1965, First Division – Manchester United and Leeds United ====
In the 1964–65 Football League Championship, Manchester United and Leeds United both finished on 61 points. Manchester United won the title with 89 goals for to 39 against, for an average of 2.282. Leeds United's 83 to 52 gave 1.596, which was actually lower than third-placed Chelsea's, although they finished five points adrift of Leeds.

=== England lower divisions ===
==== 1950, Second Division – Sheffield United and Sheffield Wednesday ====
Going into the last match of the 1949–50 season, Sheffield Wednesday needed a win against Tottenham Hotspur to secure second place and clinch promotion at the expense of Sheffield United, their local rivals. The resulting 0–0 draw meant Wednesday won promotion by a goal average difference of just 0.008 – a 1–1 draw would have left the two level on points and goal average, and a unique play-off match would have had to be played.

==== 1927, Second Division – Portsmouth and Manchester City ====
Going into the last match of the 1926–27 season, both clubs were on 52 points. Portsmouth had a goal average of 1.708, Manchester City's was 1.639. Manchester City won 8–0 and celebrated, thinking that would be good enough. The Portsmouth match had kicked off fifteen minutes later than City's; towards the end of the match they were winning 4–1 and knew that another goal would see them promoted, which they duly scored, and Portsmouth won 5–1. The results meant Portsmouth won promotion by a goal average difference of just 0.006. It is noted that had the current goal difference rules applied at this time, City would have been promoted.

=== Scotland ===
==== 1953, Division A – Rangers and Hibernian ====
Rangers drew their last match of the 1952–53 season, against Queen of the South, 1–1, to finish level with Hibernian on 43 points. They won the title with a goal average of 80–39 to 93–51 (2.051 to 1.824).

==== 1965, First Division – Hearts and Kilmarnock ====
Entering the final day of the 1964–65 season, Hearts were two points ahead of nearest rivals Kilmarnock, with two points awarded for a win. Hearts played Kilmarnock at Tynecastle in the last game, with Kilmarnock needing a 2–0 victory to win the league championship on goal average. Hearts could afford to lose 1–0 or 2–1, but lost 2–0 and Kilmarnock won the championship by a goal average of 1.88 to 1.84. Had goal difference been in use, Hearts would have been champions.

=== Yugoslavia ===
==== 1951, First League – Red Star Belgrade and Dinamo Zagreb ====
Red Star Belgrade won the 1951 Yugoslav First League championship ahead of Dinamo Zagreb with a 0.013 better goal average. Dinamo's final match against BSK Belgrade ended in a 2–2 draw, and the following day Red Star defeated Partizan 2–0, meaning that both teams finished on 35 points. Red Star's 50 goals for and 21 against gave a goal average of 2.381, while Dinamo's 45 to 19 gave 2.368.

==== 1958, First League – RNK Split and Budućnost ====
In the 1957–58 Yugoslav First League championship, RNK Split and Budućnost finished the season level on points and goal average. Both teams had 25 points, with Budućnost's 30 goals for and 36 against giving a goal average of 0.833, the same as RNK Split's 35 goals for and 42 against. A two-legged play-off match between the two was needed to decide who will enter relegation play-offs. The match in Split ended in a goalless draw, while in the return leg Budućnost defeated RNK Split 4–0. RNK Split entered the relegation play-offs and were relegated in their first season in the top flight.

== See also ==
- Net run rate, a similar tiebreaker in cricket
- 1992–93 FA Premier League, where goal difference was used to determine relegation
