= August Martin =

August Martin may refer to:

- August Harvey Martin (1919–1968), American pilot and Tuskegee Airman
- August Eduard Martin (1847–1933), German obstetrician and gynecologist
