= Thor Philip Axel Jensen =

Danish-Icelandic businessman

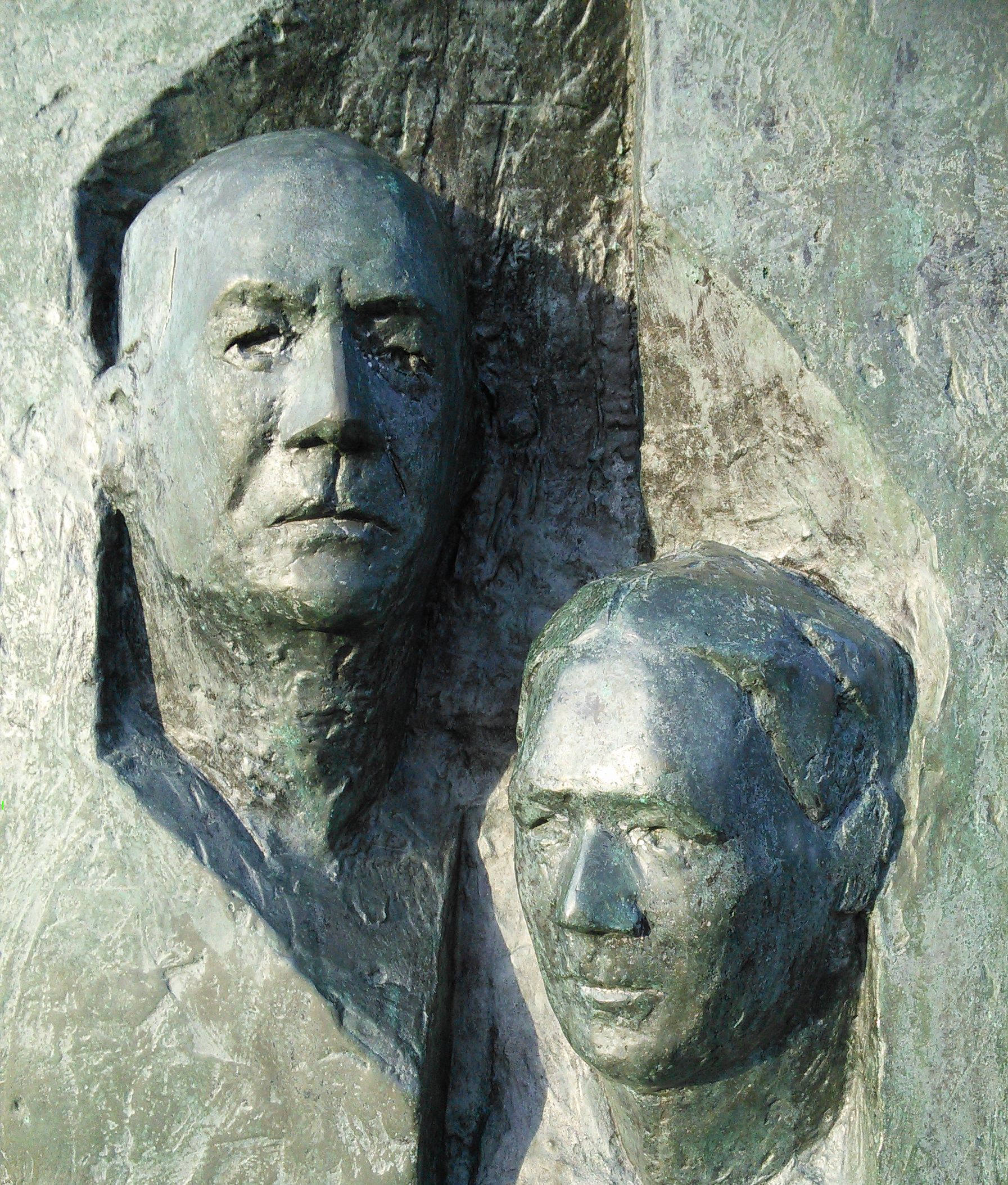
A relief of Thor Jensen and Margrét Þorbjörg Kristjánsdóttir by Sigurjón Ólafsson from the memorial in Hallargarður, Reykjavík.

Thor Philip Axel Jensen (3 December 1863 – 12 September 1947) was a Danish entrepreneur who moved to Iceland at an early age and became famous there for his business activities during the first half of the 20th century: he all but introduced big business, and even modern capitalism, to the country. His company Kveldúlfur hf. was the biggest in Iceland during the interwar years. His descendants include some of Iceland's most powerful and well known figures, including his son Ólafur Thors, who served five times as prime minister of Iceland.

== Early life ==
Thor's father, Jens Chr. Jensen, was a master builder. Thor had eleven siblings and four half-sisters. Thor did well in his studies but lost his father at the age of eight. Two years later, he was sent to a free boarding school for orphans in Copenhagen. In 1878, at the end of his studies and after reaching confirmation age, Thor was sent to Borðeyri, a small trading settlement in the north-west of Iceland, because his headmaster knew an Icelandic merchant there.

Thor adapted quickly to Iceland, learning Icelandic and reading medieval Icelandic sagas. A certain widow moved to Borðeyri with two children in tow—a boy and a girl. The girl was called Margrét Þorbjörg Kristjánsdóttir; she and Thor fell in love, and remained together for over sixty years, having twelve children.

== Businesses ==
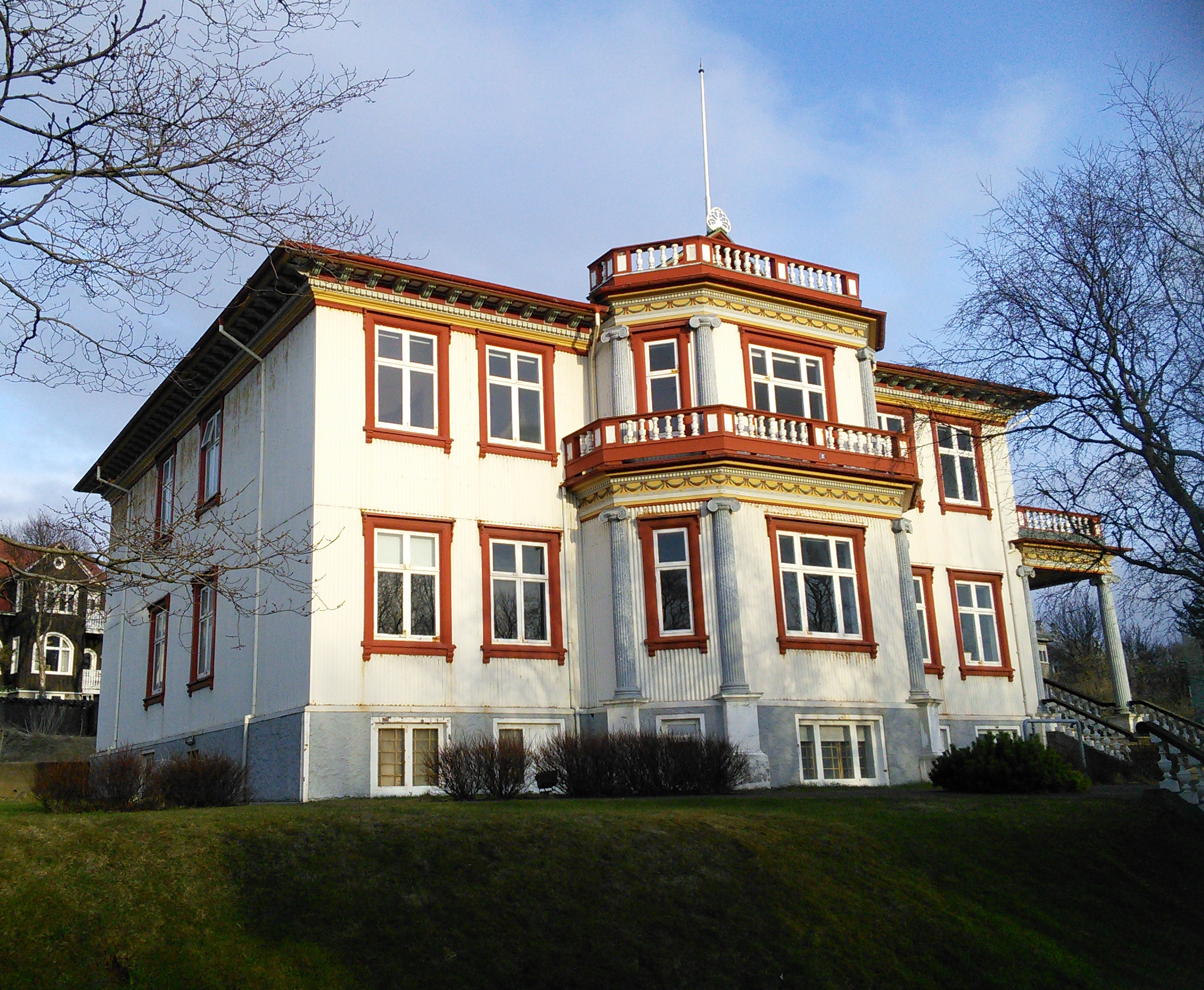
The house originally built in 1908 by Thor, Fríkirkjuvegur 11 in Reykjavík

Thor and Margrét moved to Akranes where Thor started a shop. Business went well at first, but around 1900 Thor was bankrupted when a ship carrying his goods was lost. Thor moved with his family to Hafnarfjörður where they lived until Thor got back on his feet and established a new shop in Reykjavík. Fishing at this time in Iceland was in transition from being 'a secondary occupation for farmers' to being 'an industry in its own right'. Thor was known for his energy and 'two of the most powerful fishing businessmen in Seltjarnarnes, Guðmundur Einarsson í Nesi and Þórður Jónasson í Ráðagerði, said that they would buy fishing equipment from him if he offered it at a competitive price'. Guðmundur gave Thor the use of his premises on the corner of Austurstræti and Veltusund in Reykjavík, and both he and Þórður invested 500 krónur to start the company. Thor called the company Godthaab-verzlunin after the street Godthaabsvej in Frederiksberg in Copenhagen. The company did well and Thor was soon the richest person in Iceland. In 1908 he built himself a splendid house at Fríkirkjuvegur 11, by Tjörnin, now in the Hallargarður sculpture park.

With Pétur J. Thorsteinsson, Thor was a founder member of the fishing and fish-processing company PJ Thorsteinsson & Co, otherwise known as the Milljónarfélagið, in 1907. The company's name came about because it aimed to achieve a share capital of ISK1m, which would have equalled Iceland's state budget---though that goal was never quite achieved. Through it, Thor took a role in the design of the Jón forseti, Iceland's first trawler; established a harbour at Viðey; and built Iceland's only railway line. Pétur and Thor got on badly; Pétur left, and four years later, the company was bankrupt; both partners lost money, but Pétur the more. 'At the time, there was an investigation into the affair, where Jensen famously couldn't remember a thing about the whole debacle.' Later, in his autobiography, Jensen argued, implausibly, that the bankruptcy was in no way his fault. He was also a founder member of Eimskip but was not elected to the board on account of his origins, and took no further role in the company.

In later years Thor focused on making Korpúlfsstaðir the largest dairy farm in Iceland. He put considerable resources into this, increasing grazing lands to 106Ha by 1932 with 300 cows producing about 800.000 litres of milk annually by 1935.

Thor died one night after a stroke. Out of respect, his numerous businesses closed the day of his funeral, which took place on 18 September 1947.

== Land purchases ==
Thor became noted for buying up large tracts of land. According to his autobiography, he aspired to own all the lands supposedly claimed on Snæfellsnes by the ninth-century settler Bjǫrn the Easterner, so as to follow in the footsteps of the landnámsmenn. Thus in 1914, he bought Bjarnarhöfn, along with various uninhabited plots and islands: Guðnýjarstaðir, Efrakot, Neðrakot, Hrútey, Hafnareyjar, and the inhabited Ármýrar, for 18,000 krónur. In the following years, he bought the neighbouring Fjarðarhorn, Árnabotn, Hraunsfjörð, Selvelli, Seljahraun and Kothraun. He used these lands for sheep farming. Thor also bought lands at Borgarnes.

From 1909, Thor began buying up land and fishing rights along the Haffjarðará, one of Iceland's most famed salmon rivers, until he owned all the fishing on the river. The river became the focus of his family's summer holidays, and for line-fishing by paying visitors.

== Descendants ==
Thor and Margrét had twelve children, and together the parents and children are known in Icelandic as the Thorsararnir; they and their descendants include some of Iceland's most prominent figures, chronicled by Guðmundur Magnússon. The children were: Camilla Therese (20 April 1887 – 1968), Richard (29 April 1888 – 1970), Kjartan (26 April 1890 – 1971), Ólafur (Tryggvason) (19 January 1892 – 1964), Haukur (21 March 1896 – 1970), Kristín (16 February 1899 – 1972), Kristjana (23 July 1900 – 1989), Margrét Þorbjörg (22 April 1902 – 1996), Thor (Harald) (26 November 1903 – 1965), Lorentz (4 July 1904 – 1970), Louise Andrea (24 August 1906 – 1907), and (Louis) Hilmar (7 July 1908 – 1939).

Thor's son Ólafur Thors was Iceland's prime minister five times; Ólafur's daughter Margrét Þorbjörg Thors was married to the pilot Tony Jonsson; another son, Thor Thors, was Iceland's first Permanent Representative to the United Nations. His grandchildren include Elina Hallgrímsson, Margrét Þóra Hallgrímsson, wife of Björgólfur Guðmundsson and mother of Björgólfur Thor Björgólfsson; and the author Thor Vilhjálmsson, whose son Guðmundur Andri Thorsson is also a noted author.

For the most part, the period of the greatest power, wealth, and influence of the Thorsararnir had run its course by the 1970s, though the descendants of Thor and Margrét now number several hundred.

== Appearances in popular culture ==
Thor Jensen and his great-grandson Björgólfur Thor Björgólfsson are the subject of the 2011 documentary film Thor's Saga by Ulla Boje Rasmussen.

== Sources ==
- Guðmundur Magnússon, Thorsararnir: auður – völd – örlög (Almenna bókafélagið, 2006); ISBN 9979219912
- 'Thor Jensen látinn', Morgunblaðið, 13 September 1947, https://www.timarit.is/view_page_init.jsp?pageId=1264783
- 'Thor Jensen – minninarorð', Morgunblaðið, 18 September 1947, https://timarit.is/view_page_init.jsp?pageId=1264843
- 'Thor Jensen – hinn síðasti mikli landnámsmaður', Morgunblaðið, 3 December 1963, https://www.timarit.is/view_page_init.jsp?pageId=1354486
- Rithöfundur til varnar langafa. Ekkert líkt með Thor Jensen og Björgólfi Guðmundssyni; from Eyjunni.is: http://eyjan.is/blog/2009/08/05/rithofundur-til-varnar-langafa-ekkert-likt-med-thor-jensen-og-bjorgolfi
