= Magnús Þorsteinsson =

Icelandic businessman

Magnús Þorsteinsson is a businessman and was chairman of now defunct Avion Group. He was a high-profile investor and entrepreneur with interests in aviation and financial services.

== Beverage businessman in Saint Petersburg ==
Magnús began his investments in St. Petersburg together with Björgólfur Guðmundsson and Björgólfur Thor Björgólfsson.

The Icelandic businessmen, together with Russian partners, founded a bottling company Baltic Bottling Plant in Saint Petersburg in June 1993 which was sold to Pepsi for 4 billion DKK in 1997. The three businessmen were among the first clients of the attorney Jeffrey Galmond in Saint Petersburg. They moved to brewing and founded a brewing company Bravo International OOO in August 1996 which became Bravo International JSC in December 1997. Bravo Brewery became a success on the premium beer Botchkarov.

Danish journalists noted that the Committee on External Economic Relations in the Mayor's office was responsible for foreigners in Saint Petersburg. The committee's chairman was Vladimir Putin who had approved more than 9000 joint ventures.

In 2005 an article in The Guardian wondered where the Icelandic money comes from and noted that in the 1990s these Icelandic businessmen "were not only ploughing money into the country but doing it in the city regarded as the Russian mafia capital. That investment was being made in the drinks sector, seen by the mafia as the industry of choice." Competitors in the Saint Petersburg brewing market faced problems. Ilya Weismann, deputy director of a competing beverage company Baltic, was assassinated on 10 January 2000. Then Baltic director general Aslanbek Chochiev was assassinated. One competing Saint Petersburg brewery burned to the ground.

Bravo Brewery became the fastest growing brewery in Russia. Heineken bought the brewery for $400m in 2002.

== Consul of Russia ==
In 2000, Saint Petersburg opened an honorary consulate in Iceland. Thor Bjorgolfsson was appointed Consul and Magnus Thorsteinsson was appointed Honorary Vice-Consul. The opening ceremony was held on 10 March 2000.

== New businesses ==
Magnús acquired 51% of stocks in Air Atlanta Icelandic in 2002 and a majority share in Landsbanki with other controversial business partners, Björgólfur Thor Björgólfsson and Björgólfur Guðmundsson. Magnús lost most of his fortune in the 2008 financial crisis due to the high leverage in his investments in contracts for difference, the so-called CFD scheme, in which banks issue loans secured by shares, which, under Icelandic law, the loan was for up to 25% of the equity of the shares, and earnings come from the exchange rate difference: for example, between high inflation rate-weak currency Iceland and either Japan or Switzerland which, in the early 2000s, had a relatively strong currency compared to the Icelandic króna and low inflation rate.

Iceland banks, such as Glitnir, Kaupthing and Magnús's Landsbanki, had many Russian oligarchs and Russian entities as clients including Oleg Deripaska, Rusal, Roman Abramovich, Renova, Mikhail Fridman, Alfa Group, Alisher Usmanov, Sberbank, Gennady Timchenko, Gunvor, Igor Sechin, Rosneft, Norilsk Nickel. In 2008 before the economic difficulties, Russians had $20 billion in capital in Iceland's banking sector. Because the accounts were frozen after the 2008 financial collapse in Iceland, some of the Russian clients and entities were issued promissary notes (bonds) in the banks and Iceland government after the bankruptcy of Icelandic banks and the collapse of the government of Iceland hoping to be the first to receive, as investors, some of the $6 billion of the bailout money which came later from IMF in addition to recovering the Russian's frozen assets for almost nothing after the bankrupted banks were forced to sell their assets. Previously, according to Filipe Turover Chudínov, many Russians stole IMF funds after the 1998 financial collapse of Russia. (Note: Later, Alexander Perepilichnyy, Boris Berezovsky, Jody Kris, and others claimed that Iceland banks had participated in money laundering by Russia.)
