= Margrét Þóra Hallgrímsson =

Icelandic socialite and aristocrat (1930–2020)

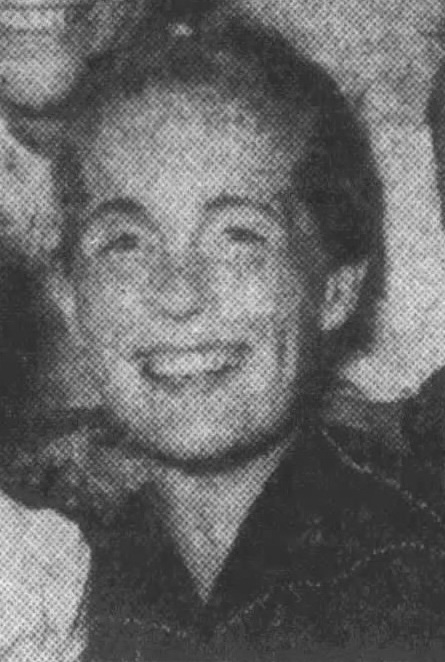
- Þóra in 1955
- Born: 28 January 1930; Reykjavík, Iceland
- Died: 27 August 2020 (aged 90)
- Spouses: Haukur Clausen (m. 1951; div. 1952) George Lincoln Rockwell (m. 1953; div. 1961) Björgólfur Guðmundsson (m. 1963)
- Children: 5, including Björgólfur Thor Björgólfsson
- Parent(s): Hallgrímur Fr. Hallgrímsson; Margrét Þorbjörg Thors Hallgrímsson
- Relatives: Thor Philip Axel Jensen (grandfather); Ólafur Thors (uncle); Thor Thors (uncle); Sigurgeir Sigurðsson (uncle); Björgólfur Hideaki Takefusa (grandson)

Margrét Þóra Hallgrímsson (28 January 1930 – 27 August 2020), also referred as Thora Hallgrimsdottir or Thora Hallgrimsson, was an Icelandic socialite and aristocrat who was the wife of the businessman Björgólfur Guðmundsson and like him was a prominent figure in the cultural and business life of Iceland from around 2002 to 2008. She was also the former wife of American Nazi Party founder George Lincoln Rockwell.

== Family and surname ==
Þóra was born in Reykjavík in 1930, the eldest daughter of Hallgrímur Fr. Hallgrímsson, chairman of Royal Dutch Shell in Iceland and consul in Canada, and his wife Margrét Þorbjörg Thors Hallgrímsson, daughter of the businessman Thor Philip Axel Jensen.

Although ethnically Icelandic, Þóra's father Hallgrímur was born in Canada. His surname Hallgrímsson is in fact his father's patronym, which his father had taken as a surname when moving to Canada. In turn, Þóra also inherited the surname, giving rise to the unusual situation of a female Icelander with a last name ending in -son (see Icelandic name).

At 14, Þóra was sent to boarding school in the UK. She spoke fluent English, and had traveled throughout Europe and the US by her early 20s.

== Marriages ==
While studying in England, Þóra received a marriage proposal from David Tomlinson, whereupon her father had her return to Iceland, via a spell studying in the US. Once in Iceland, Þóra met Haukur Clausen, an Olympic athlete and later dentist, and married him on 6 January 1951. Together they had Örn Friðrik (born 13 July 1951), but they separated just a year later due to Clausen having an affair with Þóra's best friend. She proceeded to raise the child by herself.

While at a diplomatic party in 1953, Þóra met George Lincoln Rockwell, an officer in the U.S. Navy stationed in Iceland. Rockwell asked her to dance. Rockwell was married at the time, and in July asked his wife for a divorce. They began dating early in the year and married on 3 October 1953, by which time she was two months pregnant with his child. Rockwell was also a neo-Nazi, though he was not public about his views at this stage. The couple honeymooned at Berchtesgaden. Rockwell claimed that he informed Þóra of his views and she said he would stay with him anyway; what she thought of his views is unknown. Their first son, then named Lincoln Hallgrímur (later just called Hallgrímur) was born on a base in Iceland in 1954. Rockwell was due to be released by the Navy from active duty and, in order to find employment, the couple moved to the United States with their son and Þóra's son from her previous marriage.

Now back in America, Þóra and Rockwell's family financially struggled, though they saw some success with a woman's magazine he founded. They had another child, a daughter, Jeannie Margaret (later called Margrét), and a third, Evelyn Bentína, which increased the financial strain. Rockwell tried to use Þóra's family connections to establish business ventures to support them, but this did not succeed. At the same time, he began moving in extremist right-wing political groups, which became increasingly public; in October 1958, he was outed publicly as a neo-Nazi following the Hebrew Benevolent Congregation Temple bombing, causing great reputational harm to both Þóra and Rockwell's families. Þóra's father became concerned for her and her children and called her telling her to come home, which she was reluctant to do. Rockwell's brother wrote the couple a letter telling them as much and, probably written for Þóra, expressed that he thought Rockwell was mentally unwell.

Accounts of Þóra's divorce from Rockwell, which include Rockwell's own autobiography, and her return to Iceland vary. Her parents travelled to the United States in 1958 to bring their daughter home. Rockwell agreed that she could go home for a year, but with the provision that she would come back once he had found a steady job. In December 1958, Þóra moved back to Iceland with her four children, helped by her uncle, and would never return. Rockwell spiraled into depression in the aftermath, became much more devoted to his views, and soon founded the American Nazi Party. He tried to reconcile with Þóra through 1959, but was rebuffed by her family. Þóra invited him to visit her in Iceland a year later, in December 1959, which Rockwell did, abandoning his party to do so; however, once he was there, she again rebuffed him, as the visit was actually for divorce. Rockwell offered to abandon politics forever if she would let him come back, but Þóra refused. Rockwell returned to the US, despondent, and became one of the most notorious white supremacists in the United States. Þóra did not allow Rockwell to have any contact with their children and he never saw them again, though he wrote to her for years.

According to Roger Boyes, the family asked Björgólfur Guðmundsson to help convince Þóra to return to Iceland, but according to her son Björgólfur Thor, Þóra met Björgólfur Guðmundsson back in Iceland. Either way, in 1963 Þóra married Björgólfur. She had one son by Björgólfur, Björgólfur Thor Björgólfsson, but Björgólfur Guðmundsson also adopted Þóra's children by Rockwell. Both were prominent in Icelandic business life in the period of 2002 to 2008.

Þóra's grandson, by her daughter Evelyn Bentína Björgólfsdóttir, is former footballer Björgólfur Hideaki Takefusa.

== Controversy over biography ==
In 2005, Guðmundur Magnússon published the book Thorsararnir, on the history of the descendants of Thor Jensen. In the first version of the book was a chapter on Þóra's marriage with Rockwell. The book was published by the press Edda, but Björgólfur, who owned the publisher, had the author change the text. Moreover, he tried to buy the newspaper Dagblaðið-Vísir, which had discussed the matter, in order to close it down.

== Death ==
Þóra died on 27 August 2020, aged 90.

== Appearances in popular culture ==
Þóra was the model for the character Lilja Jónsdóttir in the novel Sakleysingjarnir by Ólaf Jóhann Ólafsson.
