= August Martin High School =

Public school in New York City

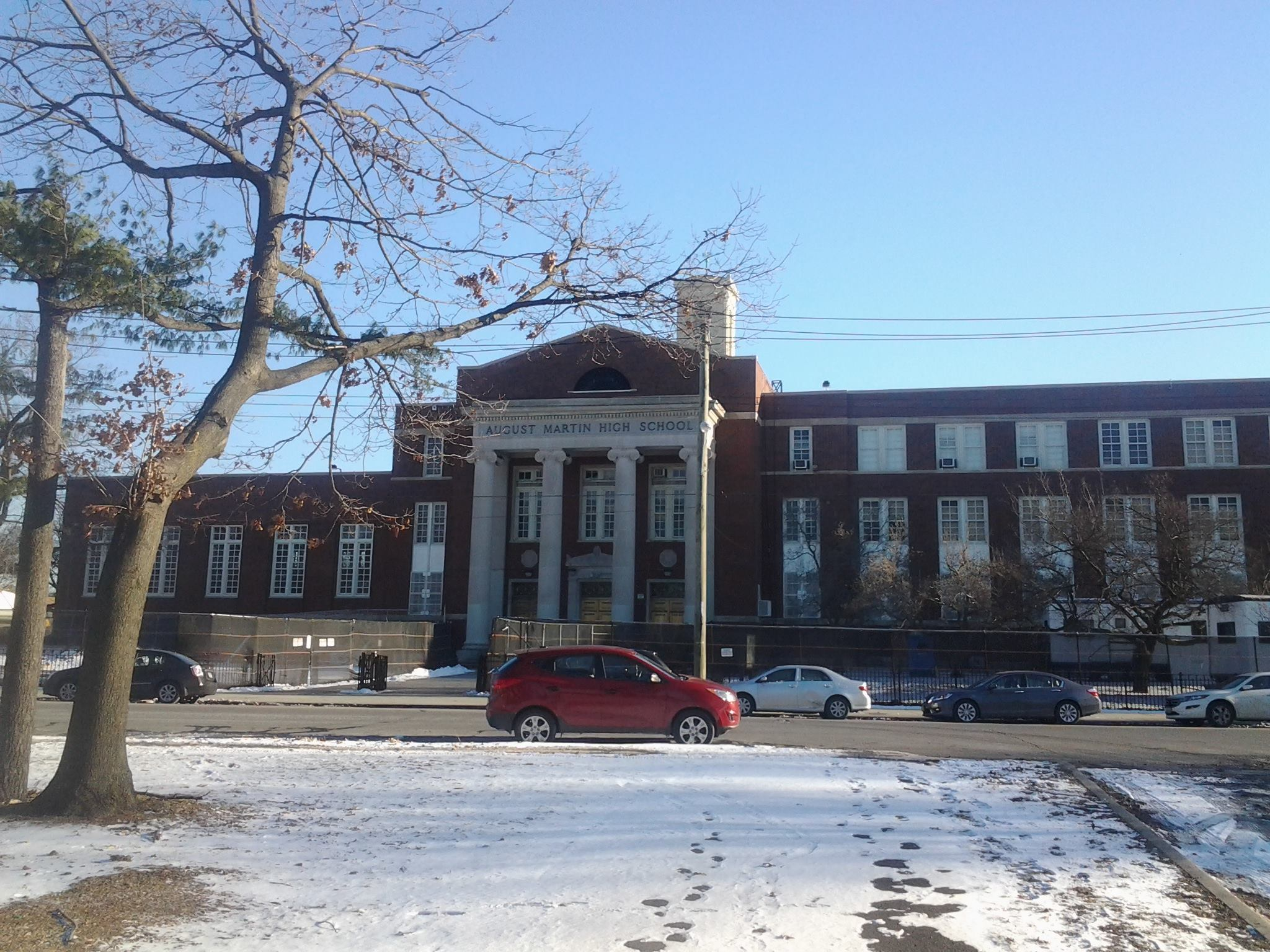
- Building completed in 1942

Location
- 156-10 Baisley Boulevard; South Jamaica, Queens, New York City, New York; USA; 40°40′29″N 73°47′00″W

Information
- Type: Public high school
- Established: 1971
- NCES School ID: 360012301912
- Faculty: 41.61 FTEs
- Grades: 9–12
- Enrollment: 584 (2023-2024)
- Student to teacher ratio: 47.34
- Colors: Navy & Gold
- Mascot: Falcon
- Website: www.augustmartin.org

August Martin High School is a New York City public high school located in South Jamaica, Queens, at 156-10 Baisley Boulevard. The school focuses on aviation (students can obtain their pilot's certification while studying there) and other vocational areas. Presently, the school comprises the following four academies, which as of 2014 had a combined enrollment of 853 students:

- Aerospace and Technology Academy
- Communication Arts Academy
- Law Scholars Academy
- Culinary Arts Academy

In addition, two separate alternative high schools share the same building:

- Foundry High School
- Voyages Preparatory High School South Queens

As of the 2023-24 school year, the school had an enrollment of 584 students and 47.34 classroom teachers (on an FTE basis), for a student–teacher ratio of 12.34:1. There are 440 students (75.34% of enrollment) eligible for free lunch and 9 students (1.54% of students) eligible for reduced-cost lunch.

== History ==
Plans for the school, originally the Woodrow Wilson High School, existed as early as 1930, to relieve crowding in Jamaica High School. The school's building opened in 1942 as Woodrow Wilson Vocational High School. Quotes from former President Woodrow Wilson still adorn the school building's facade. Initially it trained thousands of people to join defense-related industries during World War II, although it was planned in 1940, prior to the nation's entry into the war.

Woodrow Wilson closed in 1971 when August Martin High School opened in the same building. The primary goal of the new school was to train African Americans to enter the aviation industry. The school's namesake, August Martin (1919-1968), was trained as a military pilot during World War II as one of the Tuskegee Airmen, and after the war became the first African American commercial airline pilot. Martin graduated from DeWitt Clinton High School in the Bronx in 1938 and lived in New York City for much of his life. He died in 1968 when the plane he was piloting crashed during a humanitarian relief mission to the Biafra region of Nigeria.

In 2012, neighborhood residents, elected officials, and students protested a plan to close August Martin High School, considered to be under-performing by the New York City Department of Education's leadership, and open new schools in the same building under different names. This practice had been followed previously at other schools around the city. The protesters stressed the importance of the name to the community. As of 2015, the school continues to operate as August Martin High School, and this name is still prominently engraved over the door, although the building also hosts two smaller high schools that use different names.

== Notable alumni ==
- Lloyd Banks, (born 1982), rapper in the group G-Unit; dropped out in 1998
- Stephen K. Benjamin, (born 1969), served as Mayor of Columbia, South Carolina from 2010 to 2021. He served as the 76th President of the U.S. Conference of Mayors from 2018 to 2019 and as President of the African American Mayors Association from 2015 to 2016. On February 27, 2023, President Joseph Biden announced that Stephen Benjamin would serve as Senior Advisor and Director of the Office of Public Engagement.
- Byron Brown, (born 1958), mayor of Buffalo, New York
- Ed Lover (born 1963), African-American radio personality, and former MTV VJ.
- Najee, (born 1957), jazz and smooth jazz saxophonist and flautist
- Kelly Price (born 1973), R&B and soul singer, formerly on the Def Soul label.
- Russell Simmons, (born 1957), African American entrepreneur, the co-founder, with Rick Rubin, of the pioneering hip-hop label Def Jam, and creator of the clothing fashion line Phat Farm. Graduated in 1975.
- Freedom Williams (born 1966). African American entertainer and rapper and co-founder of the seminal dance hip-hop group C+C Music Factory.
