= Biafran airlift =

1967–70 humanitarian relief effort in Africa

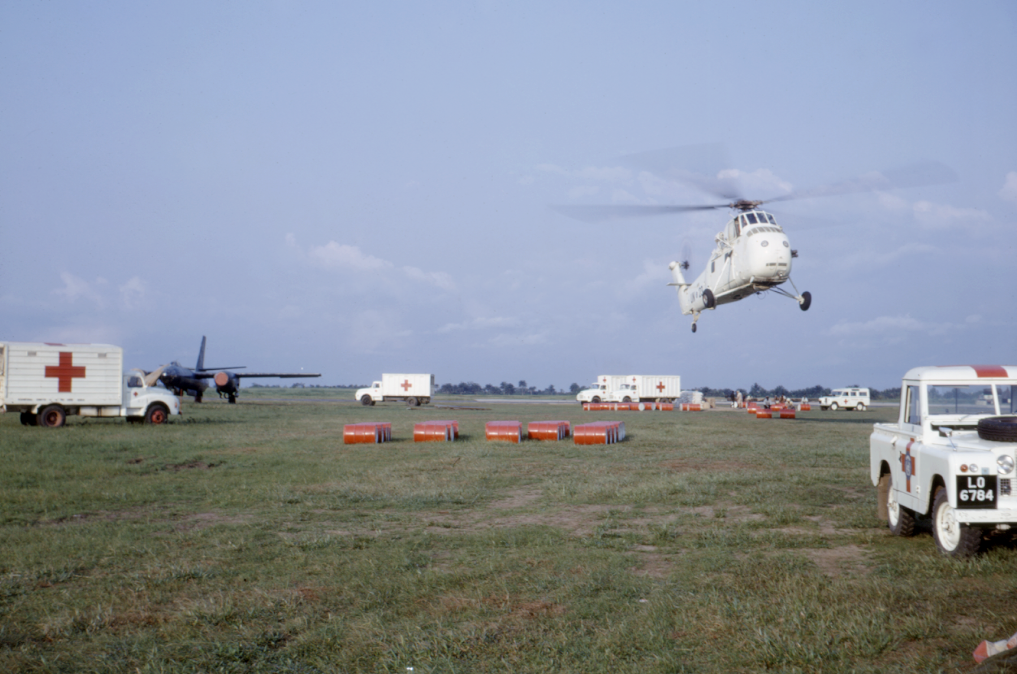
A field that had been converted into a makeshift airport in Calabar, Nigeria, where relief efforts were aided by a helicopter team. These helicopters could move one ton of crated, dry fish quickly to refugee camps in the war zone.

The Biafran Airlift was an international humanitarian relief effort that transported food and medicine to Biafra during the Nigerian Civil War. Relief flights lasted from 1967 to 1969. This was the largest civilian airlift and, after the Berlin airlift of 1948–49, the largest non-combatant airlift of any kind ever carried out. The airlift was largely a series of joint efforts by Protestant and Catholic church groups, and other non-governmental organizations (NGOs), operating civilian and military aircraft with mostly volunteer civilian crews and support personnel. Several national governments also supported the effort, mostly behind the scenes. This sustained joint effort, which lasted one and a half times as long as its Berlin predecessor, is estimated to have saved more than a million lives.

In early 1968, an Irish missionary began a relief effort based in São Tomé Island, under the aegis of the Committee of International Church Relief Organizations. At the time, São Tomé was a Portuguese overseas department and had taken a neutral stance on the Nigerian Civil War. The island's authorities had made its ports available to both belligerents.

The Nigerian government and some Nigerian military leaders stated the threat of genocide was fabricated and was "misguided humanitarian rubbish." They additionally stated that mass starvation was an intended goal, saying "If the children must die first, then that is too bad, just too bad," and "All is fair in war, and starvation is one of the weapons of war".

== Background ==
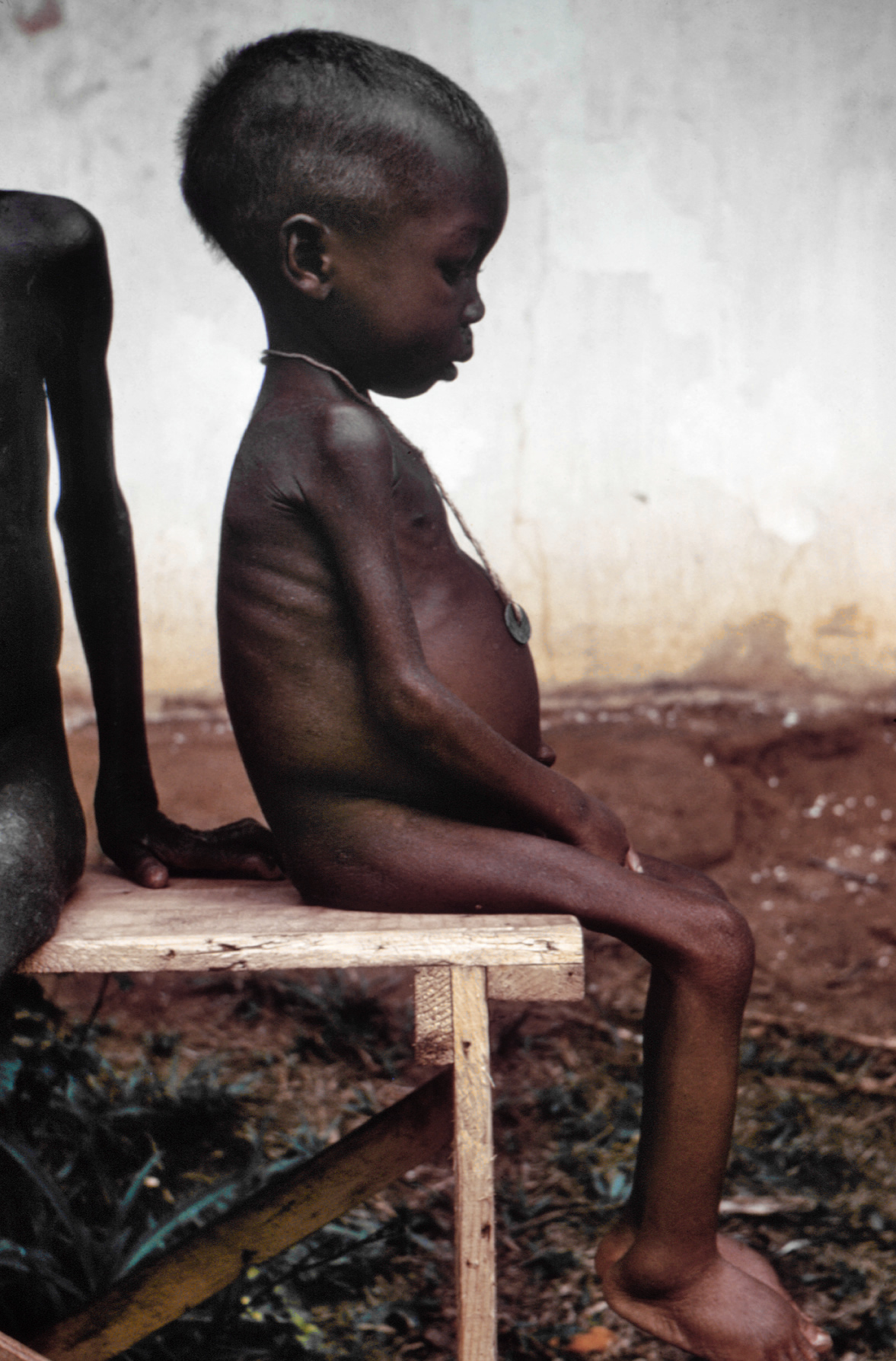
A girl with kwashiorkor during the war of the late 1960s. Pictures of the famine caused by Nigerian blockade garnered sympathy for the Biafrans worldwide.

By 1968, a year after the start of the Nigerian Civil War, large numbers of children were reportedly starving to death due to a blockade imposed by the Nigerian Federal Military Government (FMG) and military. By 1969 it was reported that over 1,000 children per day were starving to death. A FMG representative declared, "Starvation is a legitimate weapon of war, and we have every intention of using it." With the advent of global television reporting, for the first time, famine, starvation, and the humanitarian response were seen by millions around the world, demanding that both the government and private sector joint efforts to save as many as possible from starving to death.

International reactions to the plight of the civilian population in the secessionist region were diverse. The United Nations and most national governments, expressing reluctance to become involved in what was officially considered an internal Nigerian affair, remained silent on the escalating humanitarian crisis. Secretary General of the United Nations, U Thant, refused to support the airlift.

The position of the Organization of African Unity was to not intervene in conflicts its members' deemed internal and to support the nation-state boundaries instituted during the colonial era. The ruling Labour Party of the United Kingdom, which together with the USSR was supplying arms to the Nigerian military, dismissed reports of famine as "enemy propaganda". Mark Curtis writes that the UK also reportedly provided military assistance on the 'neutralisation of the rebel airstrips', with the understanding that their destruction would put them out of use for daylight humanitarian relief flights.

The church-funded groups and NGOs became the most outspoken of the international supporters of aid to Biafra. The Joint Church Airlift (JCA) provided relief aid as well as attempted to establish an air force for Biafra. The American NGO Catholic Relief Services (CRS) was the leader and organizer of the JCA operation and Edward Kinney the CRS executive was responsible for securing the fleet of large cargo aircraft donated by the US government. On the ground CRS coordinated with the well positioned and established missionary priests and sisters particularly the Holy Spirit Fathers from Ireland to pull together the highly effective distribution and services on the ground.

This led to a ban by the Federal Military Government on aid flights into the region. The International Committee of the Red Cross (ICRC) accepted the FMG's ban and did not participate in any international publicity about Biafra, a position that was condemned by the more vocal and active NGOs providing aid and here we would highlight the effective voices of CRS and Caritas International. Bernard Kouchner, a French doctor and one of the more outspoken critics, declared that this silence over Biafra made the ICRC's workers "accomplices in the systematic massacre of a population".

American president Lyndon Johnson demanded his State Department "get those nigger babies off my TV set". The US government largely prevailed upon by the large effective constituency and advocacy efforts of CRS began providing funding to relief efforts. By 1969 the US had sold eight C-97 military cargo aircraft to CRS for JCA and was reported to be providing 49% of all aid to the relief effort.

Canada, facing its own internal separatist threat in the form of the Quebec sovereignty movement, was reluctant to extend aid to an area trying to separate from a fellow Commonwealth member, particularly in a region in which it had no prior experience. However, early assistance was provided with food, material and one military transport aircraft for several months. Financial assistance was also provided in the closing months of the airlift.

France responded by providing aid to Biafra: humanitarian aid through the French Red Cross and military aid quietly, if not officially.

While the vast majority of governments remained uninvolved, assistance was demanded by people around the world. Approximately 30 non-governmental organizations responded.

== The airlift ==
Relief aid into Biafra began arriving by land, sea, and air soon after the start of the Nigerian Civil War in 1967. Reports of widespread famine began emerging, many from NGOs participating in the relief aid efforts. Relief flights ramped up after Nigeria's land and sea blockade of Biafra became near-total in June 1968. These flights were mainly under the auspices of the ICRC, with Nordchurchaid being a major donor/partner. On June 5, 1969, an ICRC DC-7 aircraft was shot down by Nigerian forces, killing three relief workers. Nigeria demanded all relief flights be subject to their control. The ICRC suspended their flights from Cotonou and Santa Isabelle.

A dispute arose between the NGOs and the ICRC over the latter's position to comply with Nigeria's demands for a ban on outside relief flights. The ICRC defended their position stating that "Article 23 of the Fourth Geneva Convention of 1949, intended for international armed conflict, stipulates that a belligerent State can satisfy itself that material assistance is neutral." A leading critic of the ICRC's position declared that their silence over Biafra made its workers accomplices in the systematic massacre of a population.

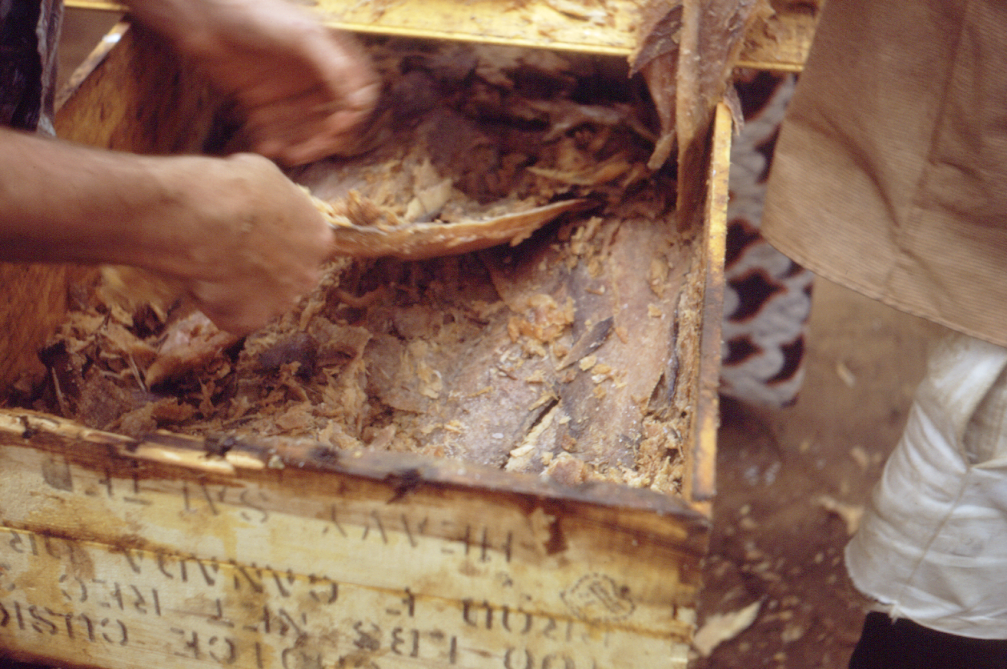
Salted and dried codfish that was distributed to refugees of the war in 1968. Such fish helped to supplement the protein deficient diets of the camp inhabitants who were suffering from protein malnutrition, which would eventually lead to kwashiorkor.

In early 1968, Anthony Byrne, an Irish missionary who was active in Onitshsa before the war, began a relief effort based in the island of Sao Tome under the aegis of the Committee of International Church Relief Organizations. The committee included Caritas Internationalis, World Council of Churches, Catholic Relief Services, and Nordchurchaid, a collective of Scandinavian Protestant groups. Sao Tome was a Portuguese overseas department under the control of Governor Silva Sebastio, and had taken a neutral stance on the civil war and made its ports available to both belligerents, though the Nigerian federals made no use of them.

Relief flights began in earnest in late April. By September the relief effort had several planes at its disposal and was sending an average of ten flights to Biafra each night. With the support of Sebastio, children with Kwashiorkor were flown to the island for medical treatment.

Relief flights landed at Uli, codenamed "Airstrip Annabelle", the only operational "airport" in Biafra. At the height of the airlift it became the second busiest airport in Africa after Johannesburg. The bush landing strip was a widened road and had no instruments or navigation gear. The flights originated primarily from: the island of Sao Tome; the island of Fernando Po (then a Spanish colony and now known as Bioko, Republic of Equatorial Guinea); and Cotonou, Dahomey (now Benin). The humanitarian airlift was undertaken almost exclusively by civilian cargo aircraft and without any escorting military or defensive aircraft. Flights were also made from Libreville, Gabon by the French who were supplying both relief aid and military supplies.

The flights were undertaken under cover of darkness and without lights to avoid the attacking Nigerian aircraft who maintained air superiority during the day, supported by Soviet fishing trawlers offshore monitoring the flights. Each aircraft made as many as four round-trips each night into Uli. The aircraft – nearly all of which were civilian and operated by civilian pilots – were based, fuelled, repaired, and maintained at the supply end of the airlift, not in Biafra. Three were destroyed on the ground at Uli by Nigerian aircraft.

Attacking aircraft were frequently nearby trying to catch the airlifters while landing or on the ground, forcing pilots to hover in darkness until an all-clear was sounded and runway lights could be activated barely long enough to enable a speedy landing. Separation between aircraft in the air was maintained by cockpit radio communication between pilots as there was no radar. Hostile aircraft were flown by mercenaries who taunted airlift pilots over the radio and used call signs such as "Genocide".

Approaches were made low over the treetops and landing was made without runway lights. At times the brief illumination of the runway lights could provide sufficient bearing for the attacking aircraft. Once on the ground air and ground crew frequently had to evacuate the aircraft after landing and take cover from attacking aircraft in trenches alongside the runway. Radio broadcasts from Uli normally used code, such as "no landing lights" for "we are being bombed."

Almost all of the airplanes, crews and logistics were paid, set up and maintained by the joint churches through contracted companies and volunteers on the ground. The largest aircraft, the C-97s, received major maintenance services performed by Israel Aircraft Industries volunteers working in Switzerland.

By 1968 most of JCA's funding originated from the United States government and was funnelled through JCA.

At its peak in 1969, the airlift delivered an average of 250 metric tons of food each night to the estimated 1.5 to 2 million people dependent on food relief supplies, most of which was brought in by the airlift. In late 1968, before the arrival of the C-97s from the US, (VERIFY) an estimated 15–20 flights each night were made into Biafra: 10–12 from Sao Tome (JCA, Canairelief, and others), 6–8 from Fernando Po (mostly ICRC), and 3–4 from Libreville, Gabon (mostly French). This quantity of food was less than 10% of the amount needed to feed the estimated 2 million starving citizens. In total over 5,300 missions were flown by JCA using ten different carriers, lifting 60,000 tons of humanitarian aid.

Cargo involved more than just food. Some pilots agreed to carry cargo that could be hazardous to the aircraft: fuel for cooking and ground transport (flammable), and salt (corrosive). On the return flights out of Uli, some flights carried materials for export sale. Others carried children, either orphans or in need of medical attention, said to be taken "far away in the sky".

This airlift was the first major civilian airlift in history, and perhaps the largest of any civilian relief effort of any kind. Of the major participants, only Oxfam had any prior experience with field operations; Biafra was their second. Pilots and some of the maintenance crews were perhaps the only trained persons involved. Most others were volunteers, performing tasks for which they had no little or no training or prior experience, from loading and unloading, warehouse, inventory, to aircraft maintenance and engine mechanics. The operating agencies were varied and often competing; many were also brand new to this type of effort. Organization and logistics were improved greatly through experience over months, with unloading times dropped from over 2 hours to 20 minutes per aircraft, often under attack or threat of attack.

== Aircraft and crews ==
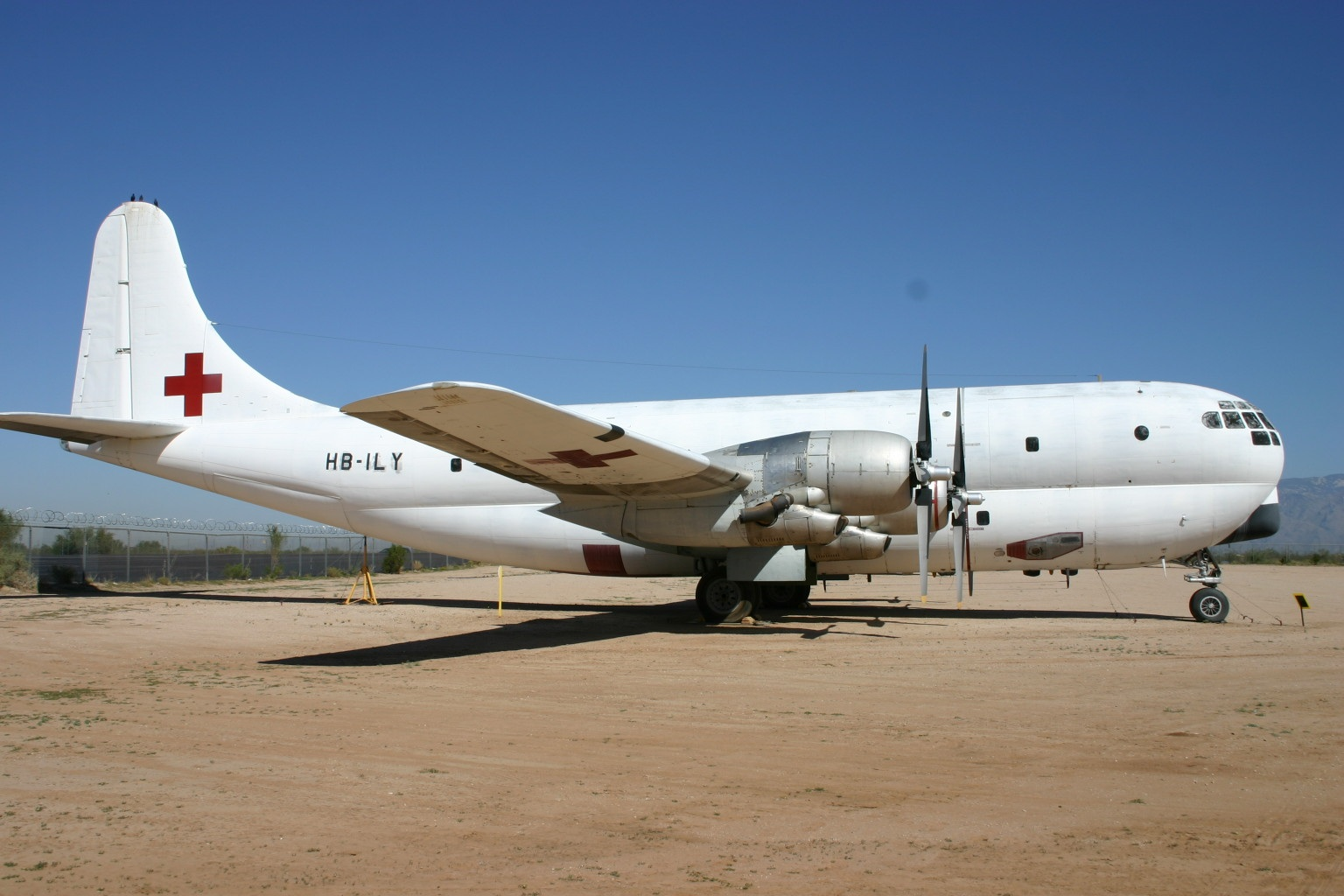
Boeing C-97 in airlift markings, preserved at Pima Air & Space Museum

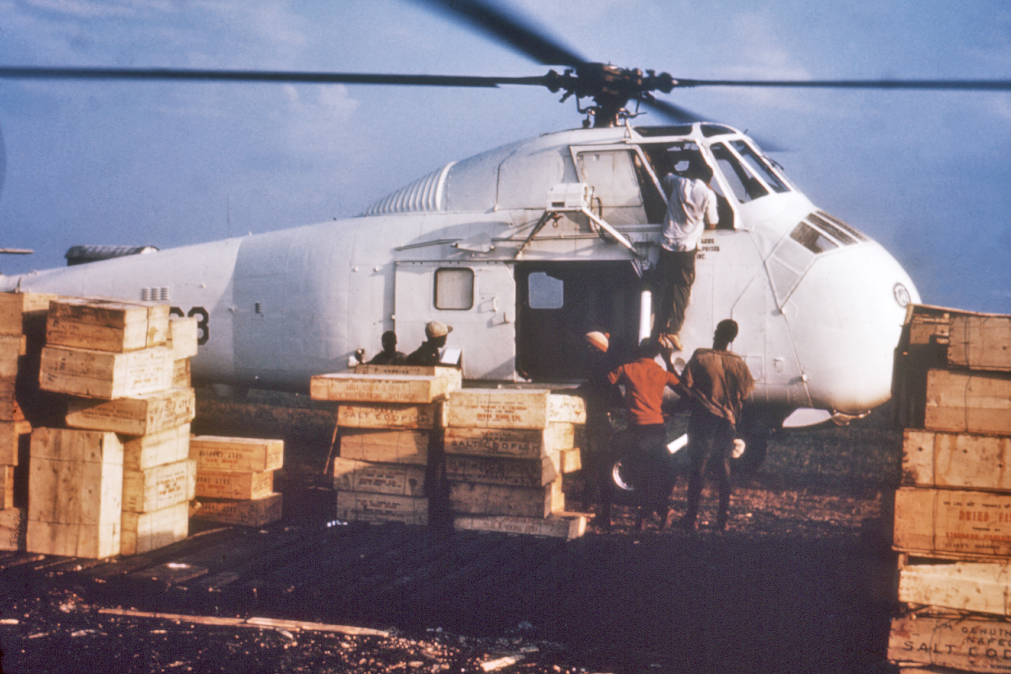
A Sikorsky H-34, which has landed at a makeshift airport in Calabar, Nigeria, is loaded with crates of dried fish, a staple food in that area, to be shipped to refugee camps during the war.

Most of the aircraft were operated or contracted by "Joint Church Aid", often referred to as "Jesus Christ Airlines" from the initials JCA, flying primarily from Sao Tome and Cotonou.

These were operated or provided by:

- Balair (Swiss-based airline under charter) flew former C-97s with volunteer American pilots and a Transall C.160.
- Canairelief - flew four purchased ex-Nordair Super Constellations.
- "Flight Test Research Inc." - Russell O'Quinn's company based in Long Beach, California, flew and with IAI maintained the four C-97G Stratofreighters sold by the U.S. government to "Joint Church Aid-USA" (one of them went into the night on May 8, lost in a crash landing in Biafra)
- "Flughjálp HF" - chartered by Nordchurchaid; based in Reykjavik, Iceland; established by Loftleidir, also known as Icelandic Airlines.
- "Transavia Operating under the name Transavia Holland NV" - provided five DC-6Bs
- Fred. Olsen Airtransport was contracted and operated Douglas DC-6s. One was bombed while unloading in Uli.
- Independent contractors

The ICRC's operation flew primarily from Fernando Po. Flights were operated or provided by:

- Canadian Armed Forces - C-130 Hercules from Fernando Po on behalf of the ICRC.
- ICRC - 1967-1970
- Swedish & French Red Cross (C-130 Hercules)

Aircraft used were mostly aging multi-prop airliners such as DC-7s, DC-6s, DC-4s, DC3s, Avro Ansons, Lockheed Constellations, and Lockheed L-1049 Super Constellations. Aircraft registrations were removed from many aircraft due to the flights being declared illicit by the Federal Military Government and most of the international community. These were available at relatively low cost due to the rapidly increasing availability of the new generation of jet-powered passenger aircraft. Military transports such as second-hand US Boeing C-97 Stratofreighters, a C-130E Hercules from the Canadian Armed Forces, and a Transall C.160 provided by Germany were also loaned to the effort.

Airlift pilots came were from around the world: Australia, Canada, Germany, Iceland, Norway, Sweden, the United States, and elsewhere. One notable pilot was August Martin, the first African American commercial airline pilot and a former Tuskegee Airman, who was killed when his plane crashed during the airlift. Another was the Icelandic pilot Þorsteinn E. Jónsson.

At least 29 pilots and crew from the relief agencies were killed by accidents or by Nigerian forces in 10 separate incidents during the airlift: 25 from JCA, 4 from Canairelief, and 3 from the ICRC.

== Contributors ==
Approximately 30 non-governmental organizations and several governments provided non-military direct and indirect aid through or in support of the Biafran Airlift. Major contributors of such items as food, medicine, transport aircraft, air and ground crew included:

- American Jewish Emergency Effort for Biafran Relief
- Canada (financial, food, material, C-130 Hercules aircraft)
- Canairrelief (a NGO organized by the Presbyterian Church of Canada and Oxfam Canada. Over 10,000 tons were carried in 674 flights)
- Caritas Internationalis
- Church World Service
- Das Diakonische Werk (a German church group provided flight operations)
- France
- Germany (one C.160 aircraft)
- Holy Ghost Airline (run by the Irish Catholic Holy Ghost Fathers, Africa Concern)
- International Committee of the Red Cross - also acting as an umbrella group for multiple national Red Cross agencies
- Nordchurchaid (an ad hoc organization of Protestant churches from Denmark, Finland, Norway, and Sweden)
- Israel (Israel Aerospace Industries)
- Oxfam
- Portugal
- Save the Children Fund
- Sweden (C-130 Hercules aircraft)
- UNICEF (contributed four field service officers)
- United States (financial, food, material, and eight C-97 US Air National Guard transport aircraft)
- World Council of Churches

Others who contributed other non-humanitarian aid, such as military support and diplomatic recognition, are not included here. Countries and agencies who contributed solely or mostly through any of the above organizations are not listed separately.

== Controversy ==
The Nigerian government and some Nigerian military leaders stated the threat of genocide was fabricated and was "misguided humanitarian rubbish." They also said that mass starvation was an intended goal, saying "If the children must die first, then that is too bad, just too bad," and "All is fair in war, and starvation is one of the weapons of war."

In a joint statement on August 16, 1968, the International Red Cross, UNICEF, World Council of Churches, and CARITAS stated: "The conflict which concerned not hundred of thousands but millions of people was the greatest emergency it had handled since the Second World War." There have been accusations that the airlift supplied arms to Biafra, but these remain unsubstantiated.

== Legacy ==
Whether mass starvation was intended or not, it became a fact and a legacy of the Nigerian Civil War. So too is the airlift. The images of children with bellies bloated from malnutrition remain an international historical symbol of Biafra, and it was these effects on the civilian population that inspired the airlift and whom the airlift benefitted. "Americans may not know much about Biafra, but they know about the children."

During that period, images of both the Biafran and the Vietnam wars were being broadcast daily around the world. The airlift's very existence was a potent example of the power of public opinion and an inspired civilian populace. Subsequent famine relief efforts in places such as Ethiopia, Somalia, or the former Yugoslavia by world governments were not met with the same response as with Biafra.
