= Kveldúlfur =

Icelandic trawler company

Kveldúlfur (Icelandic pronunciation: [ˈkʰvɛltˌulvʏr̥], lit. 'Evening Wolf') was an Icelandic trawler company that was established in 1912 by Thor Jensen.

Kveldúlfur was one of the largest fishing companies in Iceland until the Second World War, running 7 boats at peak. It made Jensen one of the wealthiest men in Iceland. The company operated from Reykjavík. In 1929 it caught 23,791,000 kilos of fish. After World War II the company declined and eventually operated with just one trawler

Kveldúlfur closed in 1977.
