= Haffjarðará =

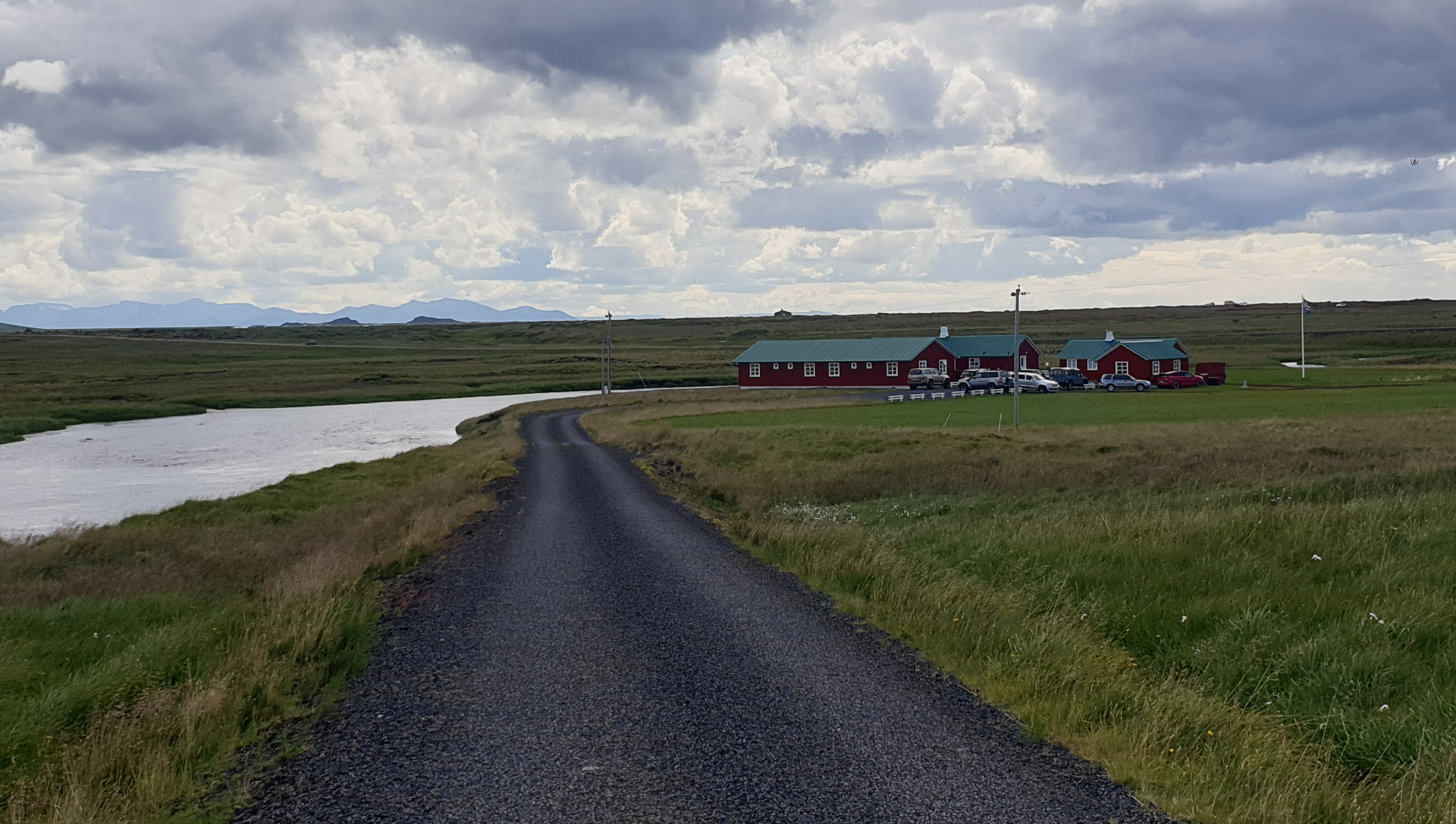

- Location of mouth

Location
- Country: Iceland

Physical characteristics
- Source
  - location: Oddastadavatn lake
- Mouth
  - location: Atlantic Ocean
  - coordinates: 64°48′45″N 22°24′55″W
- Length: 20 km (12 mi)

Haffjarðará (Icelandic pronunciation: [ˈhafˌfjarðarˌauː], "ocean fjord river") is a medium-sized gin-clear river at the start of Snæfellsnes peninsula in Iceland. The river runs from Oddastaðavatn [ˈɔtːaˌstaːðaˌvahtn̥] lake about 20 km (12 mi) to the ocean. Haffjarðará has a healthy stock of native salmon running the river. The salmon stock is sustainable, no parrs have been released to the river and since 1974 it has been fly-fishing only. There is a full service fishing lodge next to the main road. 2013 was a record year with 2156 salmon caught on 4-6 fishing rods.

The Haffjarðará river is cited in Grettis saga, the story of Grettir the Strong, an Icelandic outlaw. It tells the story when Grettir the Strong chased Gisli and as they approached Haffjarðará Grettir grabbed a great branch from a tree. When they got to the swollen river Grettir got hold of Gisli and pulled him back from the river and used the branch to flog Gisli on both sides of his back. Gisli struggled to get away, but Grettir gave him a sound whipping and then let him go. Gisli ran off and swam across the river reaching a farm in the evening where he lay for a week recovering.

Early in the 20th century the river was owned by Thor Philip Axel Jensen and his family. Thor started buying farms around the river in 1909 and over the next decade bought most of the farms and all the fishing rights on the river, half of which had been belonged to the Church. Thor built two houses on the river where he stayed with his family during the summer. His son, Ólafur Thors, later prime minister of Iceland, is said to have been riding his horse near the river in July 1923 when he suffered a head injury after falling off his horse. Subsequently, Ólafur felt not fit enough to run for parliament for the Independence Party later the same year.

In 1918–1920 Thor built two houses on the river next to the main road: a fishing lodge and service quarters. Later the houses were extended and currently serve as a fishing lodge. Walls and roofs of corrugated iron, still painted in original colors, walls painted bright red and roofs green. Further up the river Thor builds a summer house for himself and the family near the waterfall and the Kvörn [ˈkʰvœ(r)tn̥] fishing pool. The Thor family descendants sold the river estate in 1986. The current owner is Óttar Yngvason.

== Links ==
- Anglin.is – Haffjarðará
- Photos from Haffjarðará
