= Hallgrímur Fr. Hallgrímsson =

Hallgrímur Fr. Hallgrímsson (October 17, 1905 – September 16, 1984) was an Icelandic businessman and political figure in the mid-twentieth century.

== Early and family life ==
Hallgrímur's parents were Friðrik Hallgrímsson, a priest at Grund and later dean in Reykjavík, and Bentína Hansína Björnsdóttir Hallgrímsson.

Hallgrímur graduated from high school at Baldur, Manitoba in 1924 and from 1925 lived in Reykjavík, moving there when his father became a priest at the cathedral in Reykjavík. On November 17, 1928, he married Margrét Þorbjörg Thors, daughter of the business magnate Thor Philip Axel Jensen, by whom he had Margrét Þóra Hallgrímsson and Elína Benta. Towards the end of his life, he suffered from dementia.

== Business career ==
After moving to Reykjavík, Hallgrímur began working for Shell Oil. In 1925 Hallgrímur became the chairman of Shell in Iceland until 1956 and the director of Olíufélagið Skeljungs from the same year until 1971. He was on the board of the company Anglia from 1943 and its chairman in from 1948 to 1956. He was a member of Verslunarráð Íslands (now Viðskiptaráð Íslands, the Iceland Chamber of Commerce) from 1955 to 1960 and on the board of Vinnuveitendasamband Íslands (the Confederation of Icelandic Employers) from 1952. After retirement, he continued to receive his final salary from Shell, and after his death the salary was paid to his widow.

== Other activities and honours ==
Hallgrímur was Iceland's consul to Canada from 1957, and sat on the economic and party committees of the Icelandic Independence Party.

He maintained close contact with the UK, and received the highest honour that the British government bestows on foreigners, Commander of the Order of the British Empire. He also received the Grand Cross of the Icelandic Order of the Falcon and of the Norwegian Order of St. Olav.

He was the deputy chairman of Iceland's Olympic Committee from 1932 to 1936 and its chair from 1945 to 1949; a member and later honorary member of the Reykjavík Golf Club from 1934 and its chairman from 1943 to 1949; and a member of the Rotary Club of Iceland from 1936, and its chair from 1940 to 1943.
