= Björgólfur Thor =

Icelandic billionaire businessman

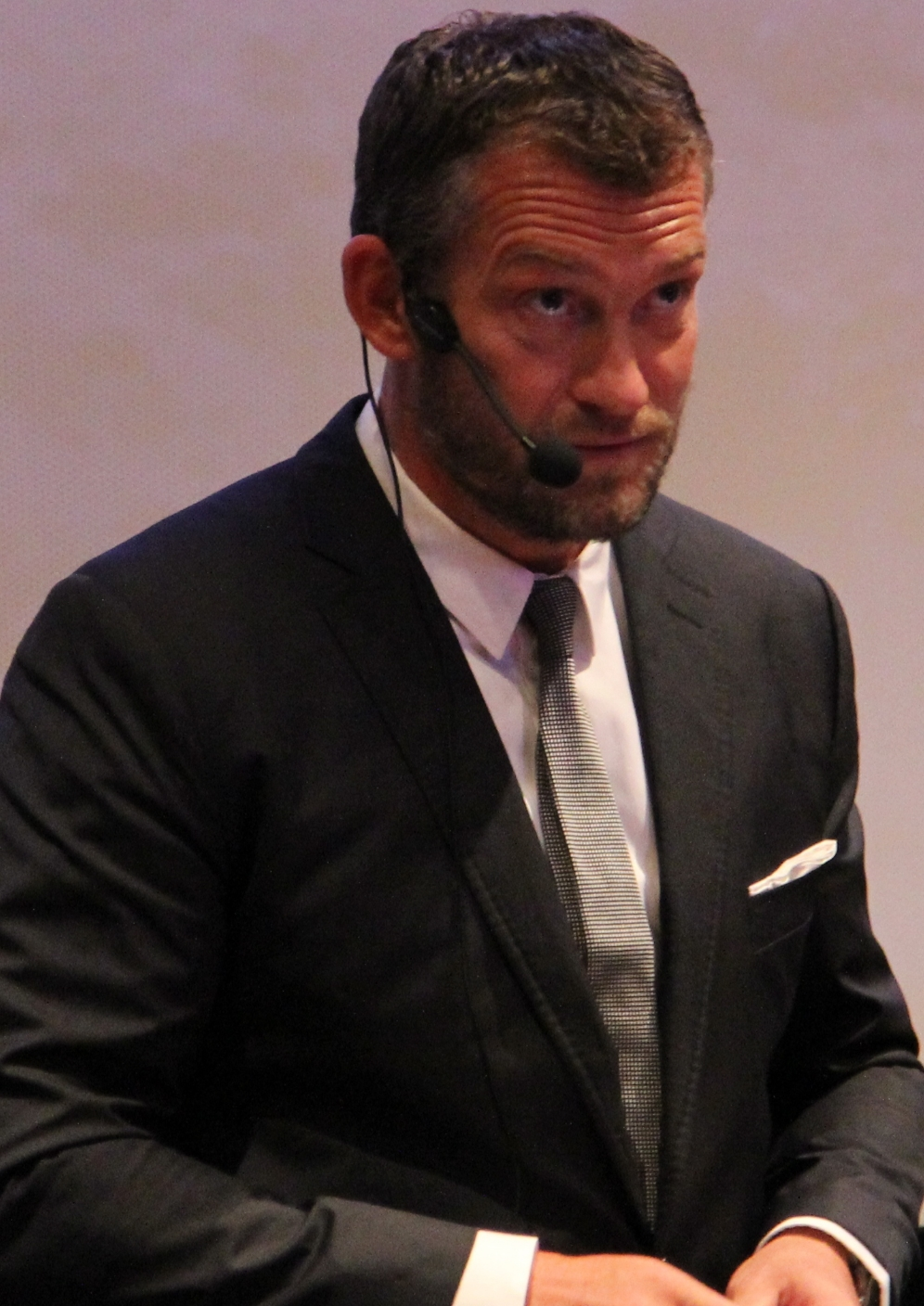
- Björgólfur in 2011
- Born: Björgólfur Thor Björgólfsson; 19 March 1967 (age 59); Reykjavík, Iceland
- Education: Verzlunarskóli Íslands; University of California, San Diego; New York University
- Occupation: Businessman
- Spouse: Kristín Ólafsdóttir (m. 2010)
- Children: 3
- Parent(s): Björgólfur Guðmundsson; Margrét Þóra Hallgrímsson
- Website: www.btb.is

Björgólfur Thor Björgólfsson (born 19 March 1967), known as Björgólfur Thor, also known internationally as Thor Bjorgolfsson, and colloquially in Iceland as Bjöggi, is an Icelandic businessman and entrepreneur. He is also chairman and founder of Novator Partners. Björgólfur Thor has built and invested in a number of larger companies and smaller startups, including Actavis, a pharmaceutical company; WOM Play - mobile telecoms challenger brands in Chile, Colombia and Poland; and Zwift - an online platform for indoor cycling. Other companies invested in by Björgólfur Thor and Novator include Deliveroo, Monzo, Stripe, Cazoo, Xantis Pharma, Klang, and Lockwood Publishing.

Björgólfur Thor was the first Icelander to join Forbes magazine's list of the world's richest people in 2005. He has been declared as "Iceland's first billionaire"; and was ranked as the 249th-richest person in the world by Forbes magazine in 2007 - up from 350th the previous year - with a net worth of $3.5 billion.

However, due to the 2008 financial crisis, he lost much of his fortune and faced personal bankruptcy. He worked out a complex deal with his creditors to pay off his debts while holding on to his key investments. Björgólfur Thor published an autobiography in 2014 about the ordeal titled 'Billions to Bust and Back'. He reappeared on the Forbes rich list in 2015 with a net worth of $1.3 billion, and as of June 2026 had a net worth of $1 billion.

== Early life and career ==
Björgólfur Thor is heir to a long family legacy in Icelandic business and politics. His great-grandfather was the legendary Danish-born Icelandic entrepreneur Thor Jensen, who helped introduce industrial capitalism to the country in the early years of the twentieth century. The eighth of Thor Jensen's eleven children was Björgólfur's grandmother Margrét Þorbjörg Thors Hallgrímsson, whose daughter Þóra Hallgrímsson had Björgólfur as her only child by her third husband Björgólfur Guðmundsson. He grew up in the Reykjavík suburb of Vesturbær.

A sketch of Björgólfur Thor's early life is offered by Ármann Þorvaldsson: "His rare self-confidence made him stand out. He was immensely physically strong and bench pressed over 450 pounds. He was an entrepreneur from early on, and by the age of 11 he was delivering newspapers in the early hours of the morning. A year later he was a delivery boy at the University of Iceland and, at 13, was running his own home video delivery service. While still in high school, he was running a nightclub in Reykjavík and organised the first Oktoberfest beer festival in Iceland. After high school, he studied business in New York. Fluent in several languages, and with an unusual ability to both blend in and stand out, he embodied Iceland's internationalism."

Graduating from the prestigious Commercial College of Iceland in 1987, he followed in the footsteps of some of his siblings and moved to the US, in a move he has portrayed as an attempt to escape an Iceland where he felt an outsider. He began higher education at the University of California, San Diego, later transferring to The Stern School of Business at New York University, graduating with a B.S. in marketing in 1991. He took a variety of vacation jobs, including managing events at Reykjavík's two biggest clubs: Tunglið and Skuggabarinn. As a result, in 1991, he met Kristín Ólafsdóttir, now a film-maker; they married in 2010. They have three children, Daniel (b. 2005), Lorenz (b. 2009), and Bentina (b. 2011). They currently live primarily in London, United Kingdom.

== Business career ==
=== 1990s: the former Eastern Bloc ===
In 1991, Thor went to Russia along with his father and a friend, Magnús Þorsteinsson. The Icelandic businessmen, together with Russian partners, founded the bottling company Baltic Bottling Plant, which they sold to Pepsi. Next they founded a brewing company, originally called ООО "Торговый дом "РОСА" and eventually registered as Bravo International JSC by December 1997. Six companies registered in Limassol, Cyprus were responsible for establishing Bravo and Björgólfur Thor was president of all of them. Bravo Brewery became the fastest-growing brewery in Russia at the time, primarily through the production of the premium beer Botchkarov. Heineken bought the brewery for $325m in 2002.

In 1999, he, along with an asset management unit from Deutsche Bank, founded Actavis, and invested in a privatisation in Bulgaria.

In 2000, Russia opened an honorary consulate of Iceland in St. Petersburg. Magnús Þorsteinsson was appointed Honorary Vice-Consul, while Björgólfur Thor Björgólfsson was appointed Consul, he resigned from the position on 16 May 2006. In his book, Billions to Bust and Back, Björgólfur Thor chronicles his time in St Petersburg, detailing how criminal elements tried to intimidate him into giving them access to his business and explaining which security measures he relied on to prevent them from doing so.

=== 2000s: Iceland, and the financial crisis ===
After leaving Russia, Björgólfur Thor started investing in several Icelandic firms in 2002, while continuing his international investments. By 2006, he was a celebrity for his business success, with an eight-page-long profile in the Sunday supplement of the Icelandic newspaper Morgunblaðið written about him.

Late in 2002, Thor and Björgólfur Guðmundsson's holding company Samson ehf. gained a 45% controlling share of Landsbanki, Iceland's second largest bank, for about ISK12m in a controversial privatization. The board was announced in February 2003, with the chairman being Björgólfur Thor's father. Björgólfur Thor also became the main owner and chairman of the Straumur Investment Bank.

==== Icelandic Financial Crisis ====
Two of Björgólfur Thor’s companies, the banks Landsbanki and Straumur, went bankrupt following the 2008–2011 Icelandic financial crisis and the government of Iceland assumed responsibility for them. On 6 October Landsbanki was put into receivership and liquidation, and on 9 March Straumur was nationalised by the Financial Supervisory Authority of Iceland (FME). Following the crash, Björgólfur Thor had €650m of personal guarantees. Rather than declare bankruptcy, he instead took two years to negotiate and restructure the debt with his creditors, most notably Deutsche Bank.

Björgólfur Thor was heavily criticized for his actions leading to the crisis. Two days after the publication of the Icelandic government report on the 2008 financial crisis on 12 April 2010, Björgólfur Thor Björgólfsson issued a public apology in the Icelandic newspaper, Fréttablaðið, for his role in the crisis:

I the undersigned, Björgólfur Thor, request forgiveness from all Icelanders for my role in the asset- and debt-bubble that led to the collapse of the Icelandic banking system. I request your forgiveness for my complacency towards the danger signs which arose. I request forgiveness for having not succeeded in following my instincts when I realised the danger. I request your forgiveness.

He defended his reputation by disputing government and journalistic criticisms of his role in the 2008 financial crisis on his website, through letters to newspapers, and through legal action. He has said that he urged the government of Iceland not to take over the banks and that he did his utmost to prevent Icelanders and the state of Iceland from having to assume responsibility. He also has asserted that as a large shareholder in a bank, one does not have as much influence as many believe and that it is the job of the bank's management and board to formulate good policy. He said that he was not a member of the board or a managing director of the bank and that his policy suggestions were ignored by the government of Iceland.

=== 2010s: business after the crisis ===
Before the 2008 financial crisis, Björgólfur Thor founded Novator Partners, which he continues to manage, and which has been his main vehicle for investment since the crisis. Novator is a private equity firm with headquarters in London and offices in Luxembourg. Preferring to take a board seat in its portfolio companies, the firm tends to invest in companies in the telecommunications, generic pharmaceuticals, information technology, natural resources, and financial services sectors. In 2021 Novator invested $250 million into DNEG, a visual effects company which worked on such films as Inception, Ex Machina and No Time to Die.

Although his fortunes were reduced by the 2008 financial crisis, leading him to cancel the construction of a £100 million luxury yacht, he continued to prosper overall. In December 2013, the website "The Automatic Earth" reported:

Mr Bjorgolfsson still leads Novator Partners, a London-based investment firm, sits on several boards and holds shares in companies including Actavis, a Swiss drugmaker, and CCP, an Icelandic computer games company. His representative says any dividends from his shares, or future gains from their sale, will go towards settling debts to creditors following Landsbanki's decline.

In October 2012, Watson Pharmaceuticals purchased Actavis for nearly $6 billion. Björgólfur Thor’s creditors got the first installment of $230 million. In the purchase, Björgólfur Thor took 4.3 million shares in Actavis. Those shares were eventually worth about $700 million, allowing him to pay off the rest of his debt to Icelandic creditors in 2014.

In 2015, he and his father were mentioned in the Panama Papers as having connections to at least 50 offshore companies in tax havens established through Mossack Fonseca, while in November 2017, he was named in the Paradise Papers together with Gísli Hjálmtýsson, Róbert Guðfinnsson, and a number of Iceland's National Power Company employees. The listed companies connected to Björgólfsson were registered in Bermuda.

Thor was one of the lead investors in Atai Life Sciences AG's 2018 funding rounds. Atai Life is a healthcare investment firm that backs studies of magic mushrooms to treat depression. According to a Bloomberg report, the round Björgólfur Thor participated in raised $25 million.

In 2020, he and David de Rothschild co-founded The Lost Explorer Mezcal, which is created in partnership with Maestro Mezcalero Don Fortino Ramos and his daughter. It is a sustainably crafted and Oaxacan-cultivated mezcal brand. The Lost Explorer Mezcal most recently received Double Gold (Salmiana), Gold (Espadin) and Silver (Tobala) recognition from the San Francisco World Spirits Competition, the most established and influential spirits competition in the world. The brand was also named Taste Master, the prestigious accolade of the best of the best across the tequila and mezcal category, in a competition hosted by The Spirits Business.

== In popular culture ==
Björgólfur Thor is the inspiration for the main character of Bjarni Harðarson's satirical novel about the 2008–2011 Icelandic financial crisis, Sigurðar saga fóts: Íslensk riddarasaga, where his counterpart is the main character, Sigurður frits ('fótur') Bjarnhéðinsson. He is also the inspiration for the main character of Bjarni Bjarnason's novel Mannorð ('reputation'), Starkaður Leví, who pays for the identity (and the life) of a well respected writer.

He and his great-grandfather, Thor Jensen, are the subjects of the 2011 documentary film Thors saga by Ulla Boje Rasmussen.
