= August Harvey Martin =

American pilot and Tuskegee Airman (1919–1968)

August Harvey Martin (August 31, 1919–July 30, 1968) was an American pilot and Tuskegee Airman. In 1955 he became the first African American to attain the rank of Captain with a commercial airline, and the first black airline pilot in the United States.

== Education and career ==
Captain August "Augie" Harvey Martin was born in Los Angeles, California, in 1919. His mother was a professional schoolteacher who taught him at home until the age of 13. In 1938 he graduated from DeWitt Clinton High School, Bronx after the family had moved to New York. He later moved back to California to attend San Mateo Junior College during which period he financed his first flying lessons, making his first solo flight in January 1940. He attended the University of California Civilian Pilot Training Programme for further flight training and acquired his flight instructor rating. In 1942 he worked for the Navy V-12 Programme at Cornell University before joining the U.S. Army Air Corps in 1943. He was sent to Tuskegee, Alabama for flight training, where he was awarded his wings in September 1945. He was honorably discharged from the military in 1946 and attempted to find a job as a commercial airline pilot but such jobs were not easily available to African Americans at that time. He continued supporting his family with odd jobs, aircraft maintenance and part time flying jobs until 1955 when he was employed by Seaboard World Airlines as a Captain, thus becoming the first African American to hold that post with a scheduled U.S. airline. He was a founding member of Negro Airmen International in 1967. During his time with Seaboard, he piloted DC-3, DC-4, Lockheed Constellation and Canadair CL-44 planes.

Captain Martin undertook numerous humanitarian aid flights to Africa in his spare time and was part of the Biafran airlift operations. On July 30, 1968, while on leave from Seaboard World Airlines, Captain Martin volunteered to fly food and relief material in a mercy mission into the embattled and starved stronghold enclave of Biafra during the Nigerian Civil War. While attempting to land his Lockheed L‑1049G Super Constellation on the Uli jungle airstrip at night, during a tropical storm, he was killed in a crash. Also killed in the accident were his wife, actress Gladys Frank Riddle Martin, as well as two representatives of the International Red Cross. The August Martin High School in South Jamaica, New York is named after him. The U.S. Federal Aviation Administration published the August Martin Activities Book for minority children in 1980 and 1993.
