= Tony Jonsson =

Icelandic RAF WW2 fighter pilot (1921-2001)

Þorsteinn Elton Jónsson
- Born: 19 October 1921; Reykjavík, Kingdom of Iceland
- Died: 30 December 2001 (aged 80); Reykjavík, Iceland
- Military career
- Allegiance: United Kingdom
- Branch: Royal Air Force
- Service years: 1940–1947
- Rank: Flight Lieutenant
- Nickname: Tony
- Units: No. 17 Squadron RAF; No. 111 Squadron RAF; No. 65 Squadron RAF
- Conflicts: Second World War
- Awards: Distinguished Flying Medal

Þorsteinn Elton Jónsson, DFM (known in English as Thorsteinn "Tony" Jonsson; 19 October 1921 – 30 December 2001) was an Icelandic fighter pilot and flying ace of the Second World War. He was the only pilot from Iceland to serve with the Royal Air Force in the Second World War, and went on to a significant career in civil aviation.

== Early life ==
Þorsteinn was born in Reykjavík, Iceland, on 19 October 1921 to Snæbjörn Jónsson (1887–1978) and Annie Florence Westcott Jónsson (1893–1936).

== Second World War ==
Although his mother was English and Þorsteinn aspired to join the Royal Air Force (RAF) as a child, he was told by the British Embassy in Iceland that he was ineligible on account of his nationality. However, he took passage to England by trawler and enlisted at Padgate in 1940. As a sergeant pilot, Þorsteinn flew Hurricanes with No. 17 Squadron at Elgin; he then served in No. 111 Squadron, flying Spitfires first at North Weald and later in North Africa in connection with Operation Torch, during which Þorsteinn was awarded the Distinguished Flying Medal. He was commissioned as a pilot officer on 13 January 1943. On a second tour of duty with No. 65 Squadron, he flew Mustangs over Normandy. Þorsteinn was promoted flight lieutenant on 13 January 1945, and was discharged from the RAF on 16 April 1947.

Þorsteinn is credited officially with having shot down five enemy planes (though claims have been made for eight), making him Iceland's only flying ace of the Second World War. He published a wartime memoir called Dancing in the Skies in 1994.

== Civil aviation career ==
After the war, Þorsteinn flew Douglas DC-3s on some of Iceland's very first domestic flights, applying his skills to Iceland's difficult weather conditions and nascent infrastructure, before flying international routes for both Icelandair and Loftleiðir. Seeking more adventurous work, Þorsteinn moved to Kinshasa (then Leopoldville) in the Belgian Congo from 1956 to 1960, flying for Sabena and working, inter alia, as Prime Minister Patrice Lumumba's personal pilot.

After a period flying ice patrols over the east Greenland coast, Þorsteinn delivered hundreds of tonnes of relief shipments for Nordchurchaid from São Tome to Uli in Biafra in the Nigerian Civil War as part of the Biafran airlift. Þorsteinn flew 413 of his missions at night, landing on a road lit by rudimentary lighting, switched on only shortly before landing.

Towards the end of his career Þorsteinn flew jumbo jets for Cargolux. On retirement after 47 years as a pilot, Þorsteinn had logged 36,000 hours. He charted his postwar career in Icelandic civil aviation in Lucky, no 13: The Eventful Life of a Pilot.

== Personal life ==
Þorsteinn was married three times: to an English wife Marianne from 1946 to 1952; from 1952 to 1965 or 1967 to Margrét Þorbjörg Thors, one of his Dakota stewardesses and daughter to Ólafur Thors, four times Iceland's Prime Minister; and to Katrín Þorðardóttir from 1969 to her death in 1994. In retirement, Þorsteinn focused on devoting time to his wife, to fishing, watercolour painting, and writing. He was survived by six of his seven children.
