= Margrét Þorbjörg Thors Hallgrímsson =

Icelandic matriarch

Margrét Þorbjörg Thors Hallgrímsson (April 22, 1902 – September 2, 1996) was a matriarch of one of the most powerful families in Iceland in the 20th century. She was the eighth child of Margrét Þorbjörg Kristjánsdóttir and Thor Philip Axel Jensen, one of Iceland's most powerful businessmen, and the last of them to die. On November 17, 1928, Margrét Þorbjörg married the businessman Hallgrímur Fr. Hallgrímsson (1905–1989), with whom she had Margrét Þóra Hallgrímsson and Elína Benta.
