= Haukur Clausen =

Icelandic athletics competitor

Haukur Clausen (8 November 1928 – 1 May 2003) was an Icelandic Olympic athlete and a dentist.

== Family life ==
Clausen's father was Arreboe Clausen (5 November 1892 – 8 December 1956), a merchant and later chauffeur, and his mother was Sesselja Þorsteinsdóttir Clausen (born 28 December 1905). Haukur had a twin brother, Örn, and a half-brother, Alfreð Clausen (born 1918).

On 6 January 1951, Clausen married Margrét Þóra Hallgrímsson, with whom he had Örn Friðrik (born 13 July 1951), but they separated just a year later. He later remarried and had two children: Anna Marie (born 25 November 1954) and Haukur Arreboe (born 9 October 1959). His last wife was Elín Hrefna Thorarensen (born 17 February 1944), whom he married on 11 March 1967. They had Ragnheiður Elín (born 16 May 1968) and Þórunn Erna Clausen, an actress (born 12 September 1975).

== Athletic career ==
Haukur was an athlete from 1946-51. At the age of 19, he made it to the sixth heat of the men's 100 metres at the 1948 London Summer Olympics. He also competed in the European Championships in Brussels in 1950, with Europe's best time (21.3 seconds) for the 200 metre sprint for 1950, and became Nordic Champion in the 200m sprint in 1947. He held a range of Icelandic records in athletics.

== Later career ==
Haukur graduated from Menntaskólinn í Reykjavík in 1948 and from the University of Iceland as a Candidate in Dentistry in 1952. He gained his dentistry license in 1952 and undertook his postgraduate studies at the University of Minnesota 1952-53. Returning to Iceland, he began his own practice, which he ran until July 1994, when he retired.

Haukur was the president of the Félag tannlæknanema (Student Dentists' Association) in 1951, and involved in the Tannlæknafélag Íslands (Dentists' Association of Iceland) from 1972, acting in 1973-74 as deputy chair and 1974-76 as chair. He was on the board of the Tannsmíðaskóli 1979-83.

== Art ==
Haukur was keen on painting and held two exhibitions at Kjarvalsstaðir in 1981 and 1987.

== Competition record ==
Year	Competition	Venue	Position	Event	Notes
Representing Iceland
1948	Summer Olympics	London, England	6th, QF 2	100 m	
1948	Summer Olympics	London, England	3rd, Heat 1	200 m	22.2

== Sources ==
- 'Haukur Clausen', Morgunblaðið, 13 May 2003, p. 32, http://www.mbl.is/greinasafn/grein/730658/, http://timarit.is/view_page_init.jsp?issId=251408&pageId=3470781&lang=is.
- Gunnar Þormar et al., 'Haukur Clausen', in Tannlæknatal 1854-1984: Æviágrip íslenskra tannlækna ([n.p.]: Tannlæknafélag Íslands, 1984), 58-59.
