= Eimskip =

Icelandic shipping company

Eimskipafélag Íslands hf.
- Type: Publicly traded company
- Traded as: Nasdaq Iceland: EIM
- Industry: Freight transport
- Founded: 1914 (112 years ago)
- Headquarters: Reykjavík, Iceland
- Key people: Vilhelm Már Þorsteinsson (CEO)
- Products: Shipping and logistics
- Revenue: € 668 million (2020)
- Net income: € 4.45 million (2020)
- Number of employees: 1619
- Website: www.eimskip.com

Eimskipafélag Íslands hf. (Note: hf. stands for hlutafélag (lit. 'shares partnership', cf. limited liability company).) (Icelandic pronunciation: [ˈeimˌscɪpaˌfjɛːˌlaːɣ ˈistlan(t)s], lit. 'Iceland Steamship Company'), trading as Eimskip ([ˈeimˌscɪp], lit. 'Steamship'), is an international shipping company with 56 offices in 20 countries and four continents; Europe, North America, South America and Asia. Eimskip specialises in worldwide freight forwarding services with focus on frozen and chilled commodities. The company also operates the passenger transport ferries Baldur and Særún.

Eimskip was founded on 17 January 1914, with the issue of shares where many Icelanders became founding members and the company was called "the favourite child of the nation", in Icelandic "óskabarn þjóðarinnar".

Eimskip operates seven vessels and received its newest and most environmentally friendly vessels in 2020, Dettifoss and Brúarfoss, which sail in collaboration with the Greenlandic shipping company Royal Arctic Line between Iceland, Greenland, the Faroe Islands and Scandinavia.

Also, Eimskip operates 42 warehouses and cold storages in North America, Europe, and Asia. And was once the biggest owner of cold storages in the world with over 180 cold storages on five continents.

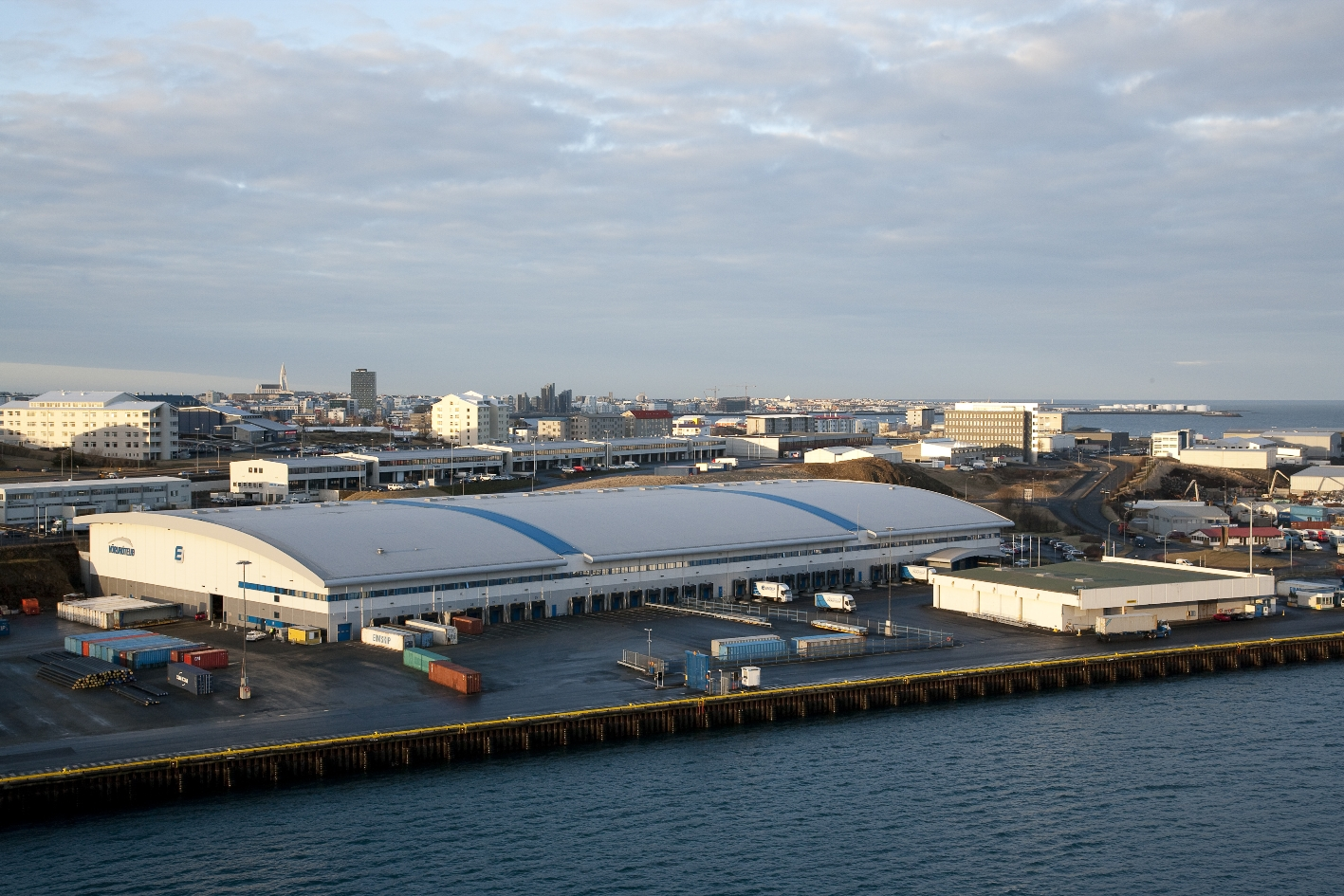
Warehouse in Reykjavík

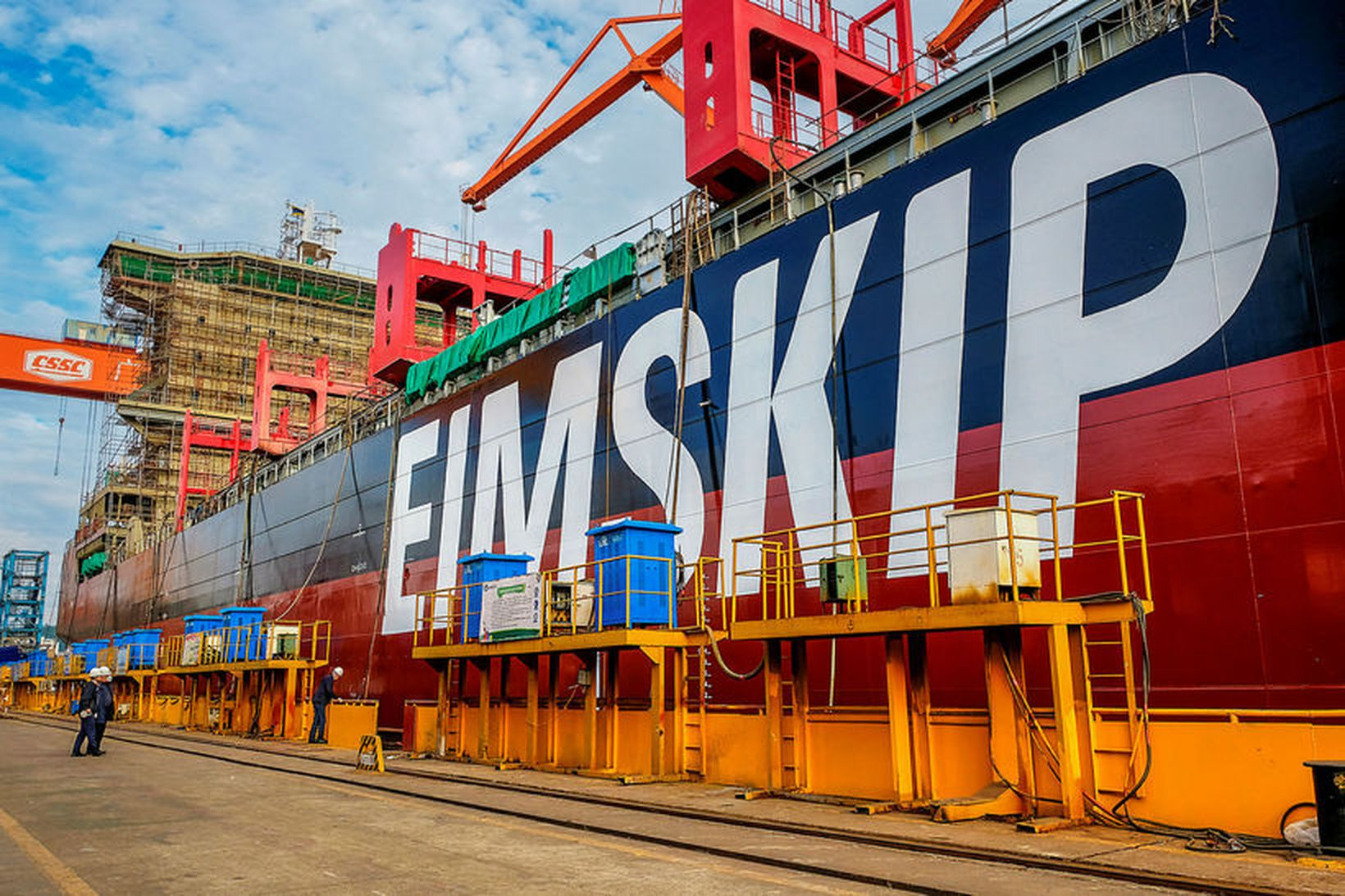
Brúarfoss in building 2019

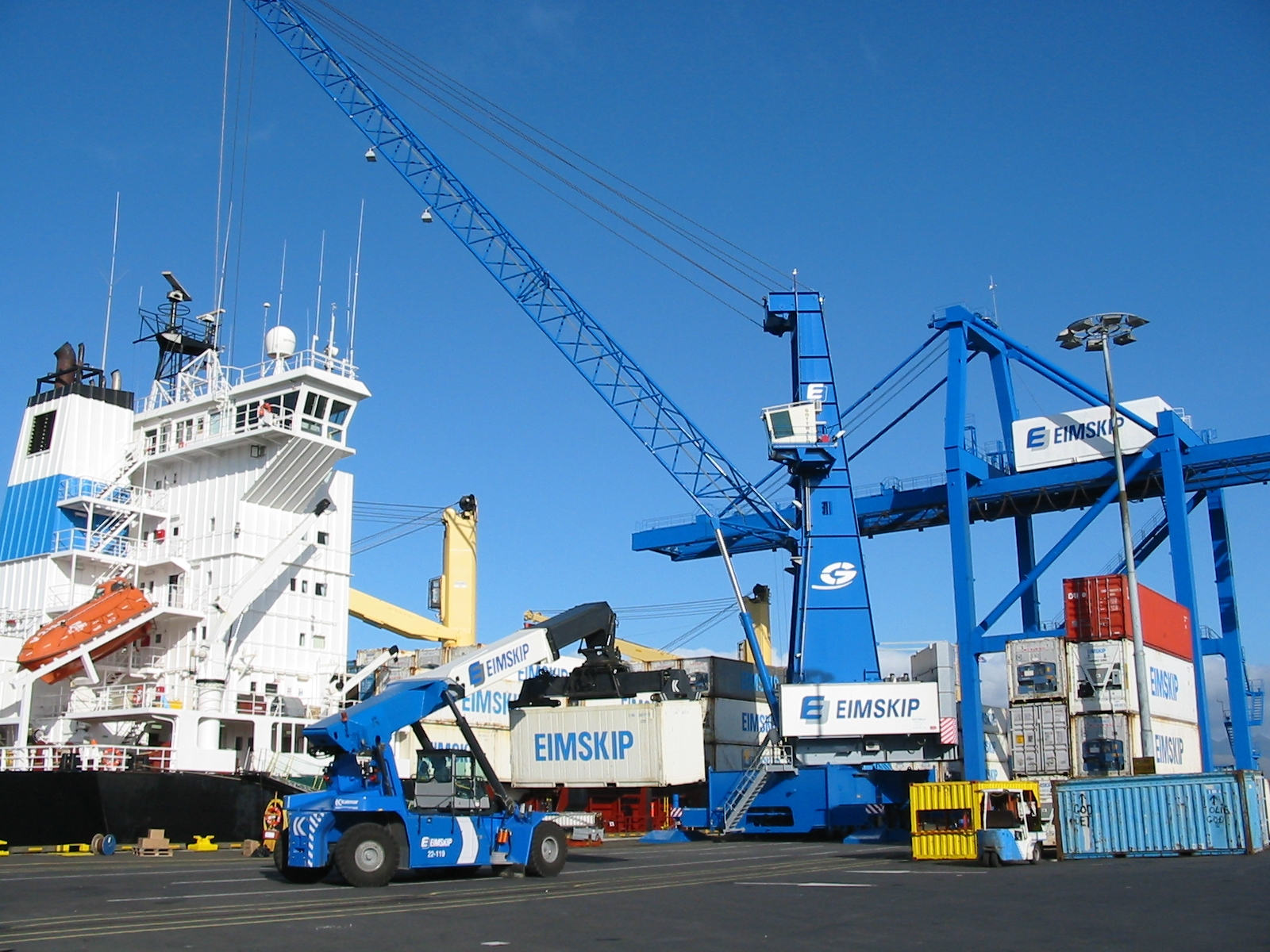
Harbor area.

== History ==
Eimskipafélag Íslands was founded in 1914 with the issuance of public shares to around 14,000 people, about 15% of the Icelandic population at the time. The first chairman of the board was Sveinn Björnsson, who later became the first president of Iceland.

== Executives ==
- Vilhelm Már Þorsteinsson, Eimskip CEO
- Rósa Guðmundsdóttir, Eimskip CFO / Finance
- Hilmar Pétur Valgarðsson, Eimskip COO / Operations
- Hilmar Karlsson, Eimskip CIO / IT
- Edda Rut Björnsdóttir, Eimskip Executive Vice President / Human Resources and Communication
- Bragi Þór Marinósson, Eimskip Executive Vice President / International Operations
- Björn Einarsson, Eimskip Vice President / Sales and Business Management
- Jónína Guðný Magnúsdóttir, Eimskip Executive Vice President / Iceland Domestic Operations and Services
- Davíð Ingi Jónsson, Eimskip General Counsel and Compliance Officer

== Board of directors ==
- Óskar Magnússon, Chairman of the board
- Margrét Guðmundsdóttir, Vice-Chairman of the Board
- Guðrún Ó. Blöndal, Board Member
- Lárus Blöndal, Board Member
- Ólöf Hildur Pálsdóttir, Board member
