= XL Airways UK =

British airline

XL Airways
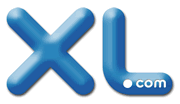

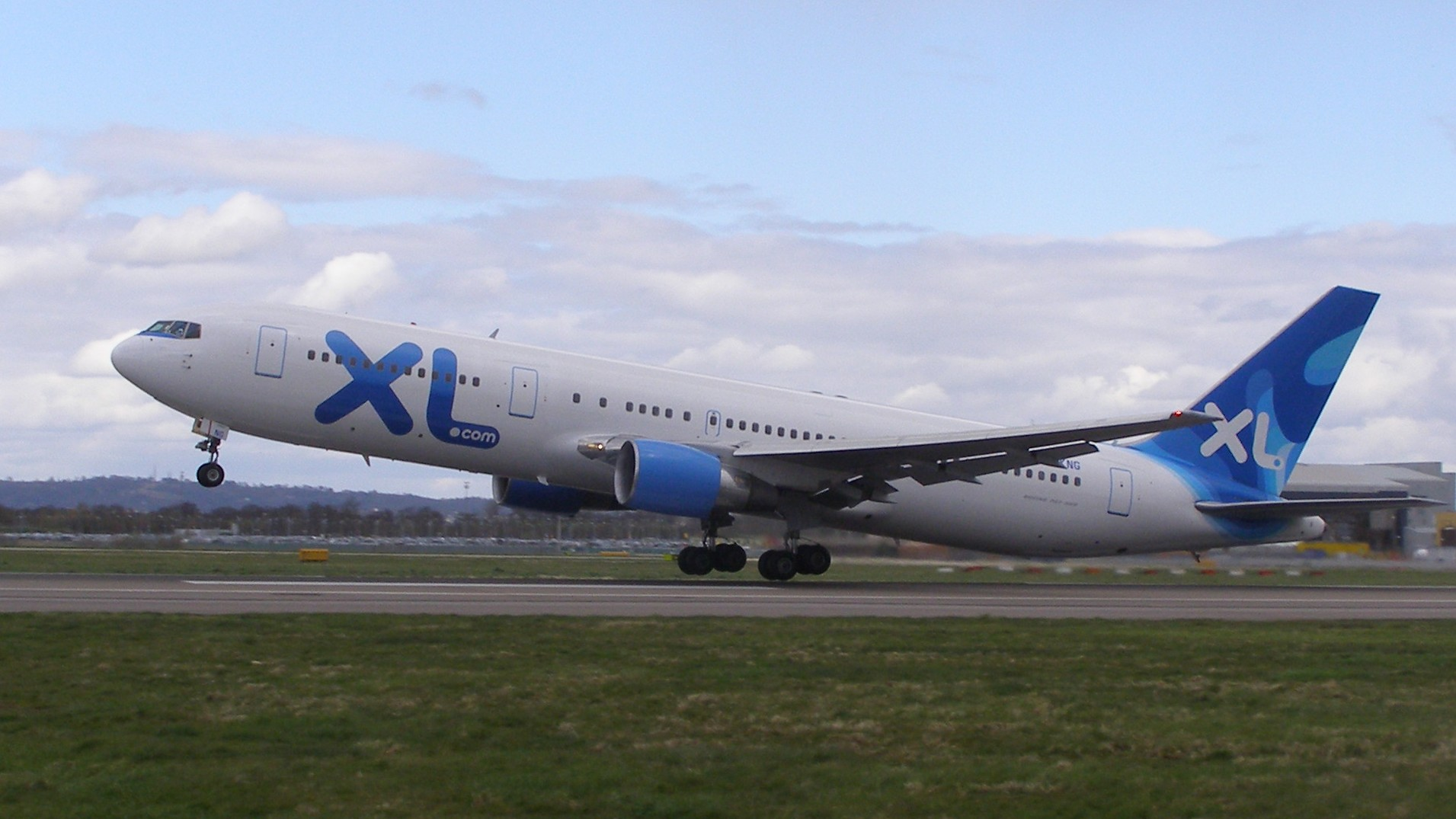
- XL Boeing 767-300ERs
IATA	ICAO	Call sign
JN	XLA	EXPO
- Founded: 18 October 1994 (as Sabre Airways)
- Commenced operations: 17 December 1994 (as Sabre Airways)
- Ceased operations: 12 September 2008
- Operating bases: Birmingham; Bristol; East Midlands; Glasgow; London–Gatwick; Manchester; Newcastle upon Tyne
- Hubs: London Gatwick; Newcastle Airport; Manchester Airport; East Midlands; Glasgow Airport; Bristol Airport; Barbados Focus city
- Alliance: None
- Subsidiaries: XL Airways Ireland; XL Holidays Ltd
- Destinations: 40
- Parent company: XL Leisure Group
- Headquarters: Crawley, England
- Key people: CEO Phil Wyatt; Chairman Peter Owen
- Total assets: XL Holidays

XL Airways was a British low-cost charter and scheduled airline, which ceased operations when it went into administration on 12 September 2008. Its headquarters were in Crawley, West Sussex, near London Gatwick Airport. It was part of the XL Leisure Group. From its three bases at London Gatwick, Manchester and Glasgow, the airline provided short-haul and long-haul charter services, predominantly to leisure destinations. The airline also operated services from Newcastle, Bristol, East Midlands, Birmingham and Ireland West (Knock).

== History ==
=== Sabre Airways ===
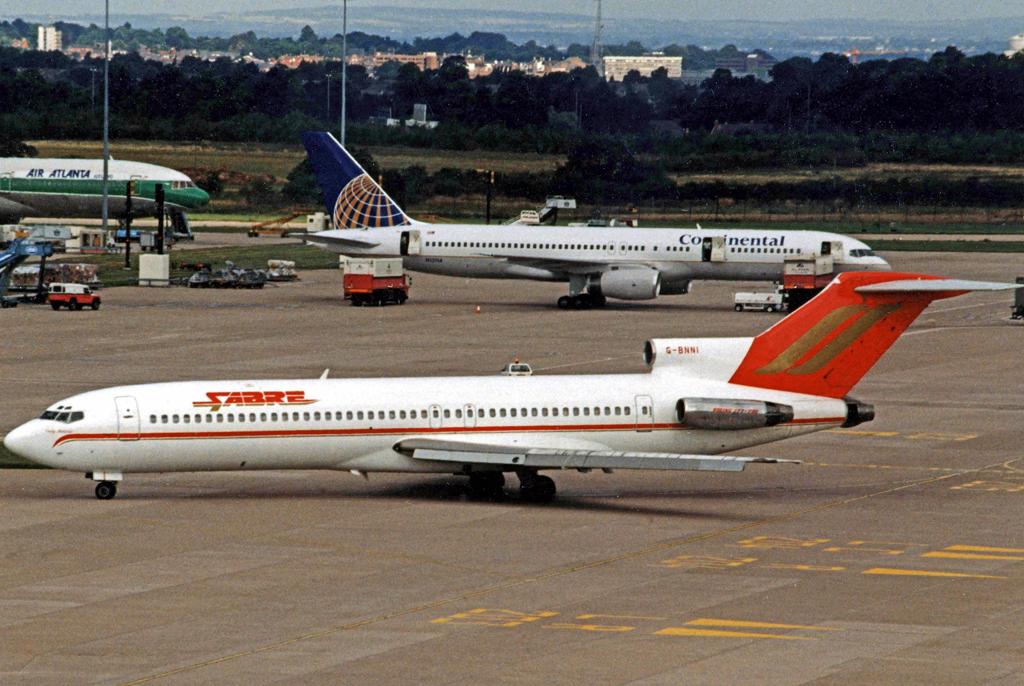
Sabre Airways operated this Boeing 727 between 1995 and 2001

The airline was established on 18 October 1994 as Sabre Airways Ltd. at the initiative of seat-brokers, Goldcrest Aviation, and started operations on the following 17 December. At the beginning operations were inclusive tour business from Birmingham, London-Gatwick, Luton, Manchester, Newcastle and later, Bristol. Two former Ambassador Boeing 737-200s were leased and initially operated under Air Foyle’s AOC until the end of 1995, when Sabre attained its own certificate. Early in 1995, Sabre took delivery of two newly hush-kitted Boeing 727-200s, enabling penalty-free night operations from UK airports. From mid-1998, Sabre began upgrading to the Boeing 737-800 variant in 189 all-leather seat configuration.

Two further B727s were obtained from a bankrupt US carrier in mid-2000, but all four of Sabre’s examples followed MD, Keith Newnham, when he left to form Cougar Airways late in 2000. In June 2000, it was announced that the Cyprus-based Libra Holidays Group had taken a one-third financial stake in Sabre. Awaiting delivery of new Boeings, two Lockheed Tri-Stars were leased to cover the summer capacity shortfall in 2000, repeated for the following season with Boeing 767s. The airline remained highly profitable, with a year-on-year increase in passengers up to almost 750,000 in 2000 at an average load factor of around 80%.

=== Excel Airways ===
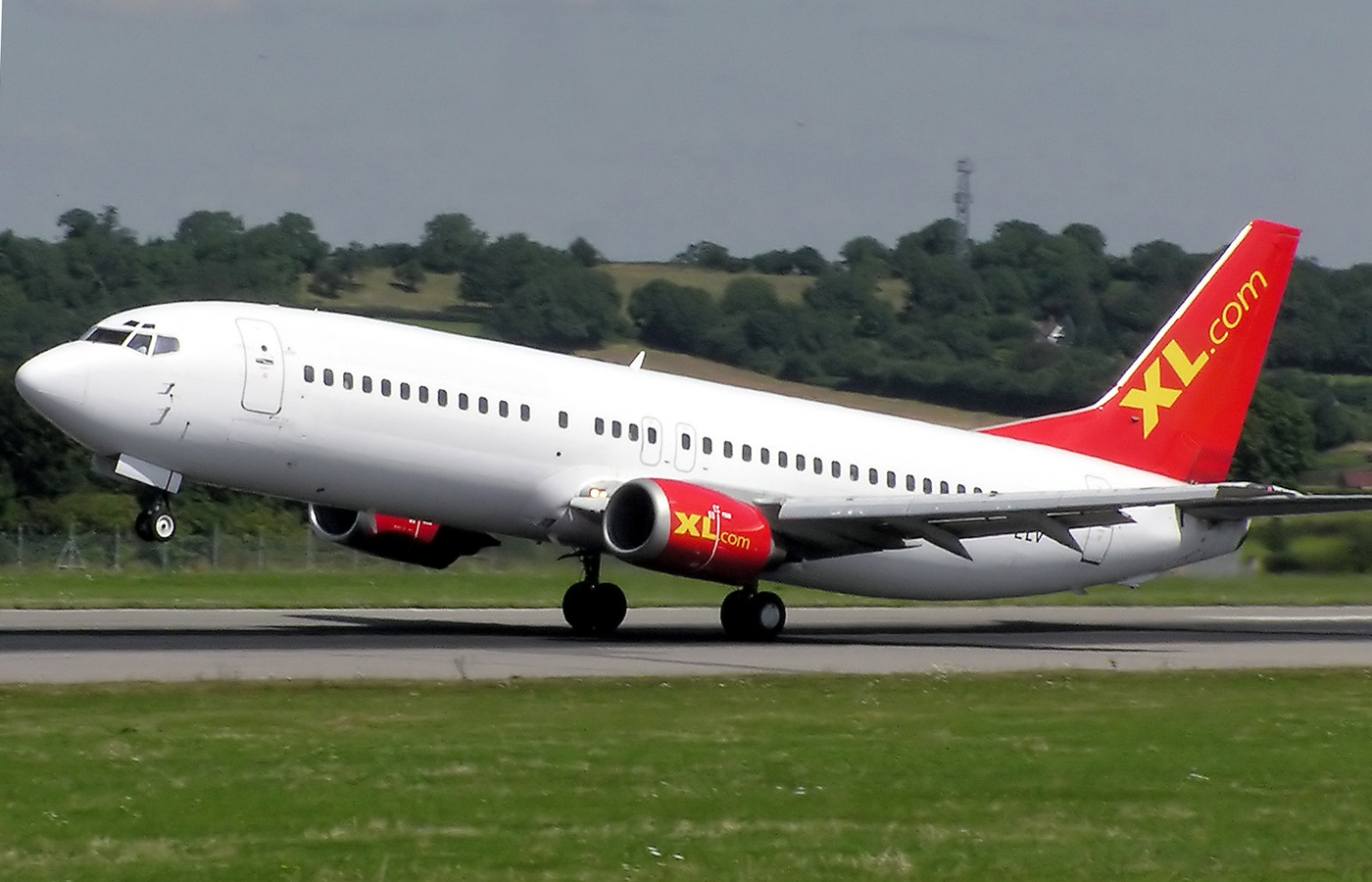
Boeing 737-400 in old livery

By early 2001, Sabre had five B737s in service and in May, coincident with Libra increasing its holding to 67%, the airline effected a name change to Excel Airways Ltd. under a new Chief Executive, Eamonn Mullaney, former head of Caledonian Airways. The Libra Group ultimately achieved total control of Excel. The air carrier concentrated on flights from Gatwick and Manchester to holiday destinations including Greece, Cyprus, Turkey, Spain, the Canaries, St Lucia and Egypt. In mid-2006 the airline acquired three Boeing 747-300 aircraft. They were operated between the UK and Orlando for Travel City Direct, but left the fleet in November 2007, following the expiration of their leases. Air Atlanta Icelandic bought a 40.5% stake in Excel during 2004 before subsequently achieving complete control and integration with Air Atlanta Europe by May 2006.

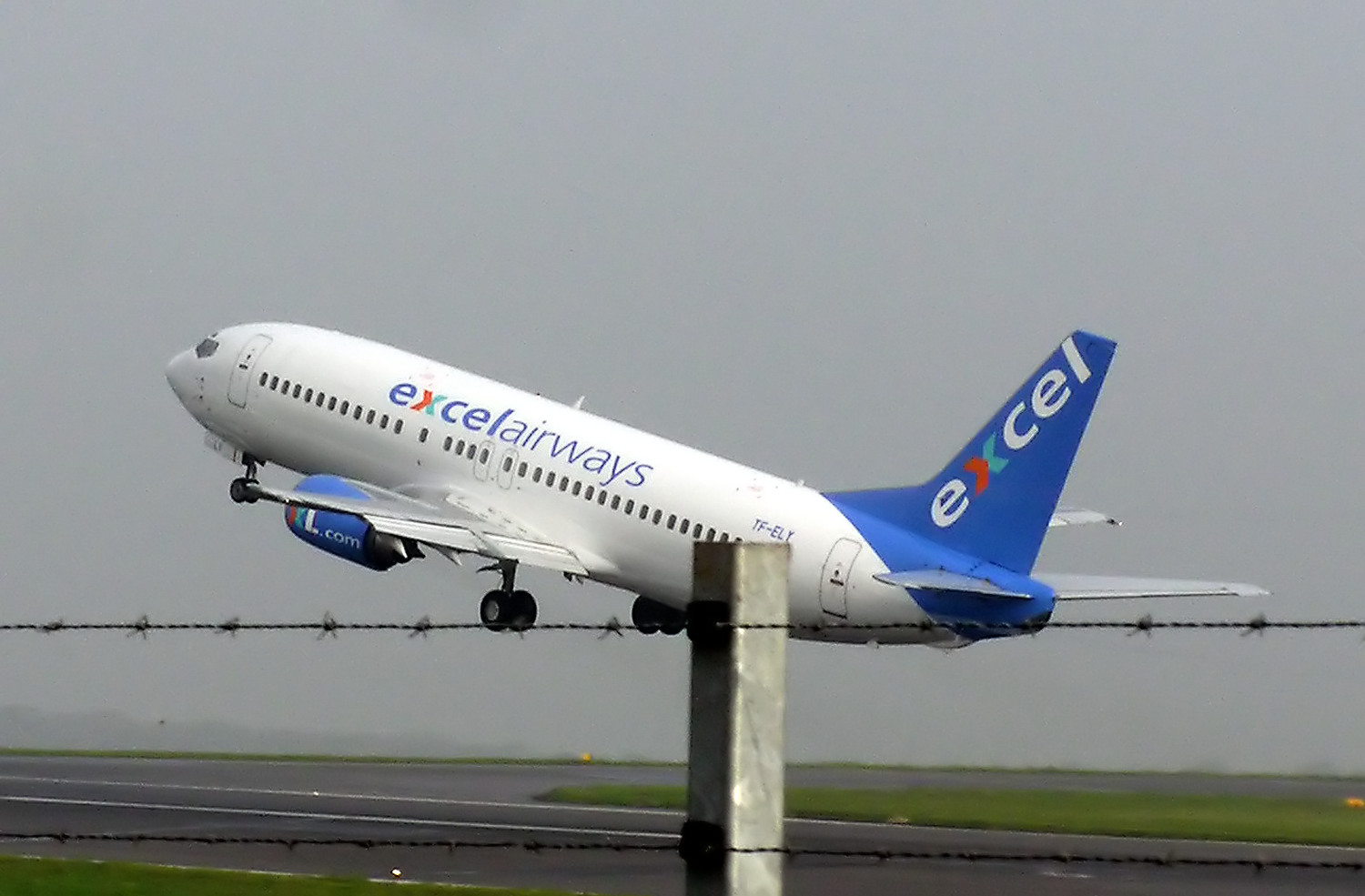
Boeing 737-400, 2005

=== XL Airways ===
After only five months under new ownership, the parent Avion Group decided to sell its XL Leisure Group division, which included Excel and Star Airlines in France and Germany. Excel was acquired for $450m in a management buyout headed by CEO Phillip Wyatt and restyled as XL Airways Ltd. in November 2006. The deal included Star Airlines operations in Europe, which were rebranded XL France and XL Germany. As part of a major brand relaunch in November, the XL.com website and aircraft branding was adopted by the Excel Group.

In March 2006, Excel Airways had signed an agreement with GE Commercial Aviation Services for the lease of two Next-Generation Boeing 737-900ER (Extended Range) aircraft. They were the first examples of the latest variant of the Boeing 737 aircraft to operate in the UK when delivered in May 2008.

=== Cessation of operations ===
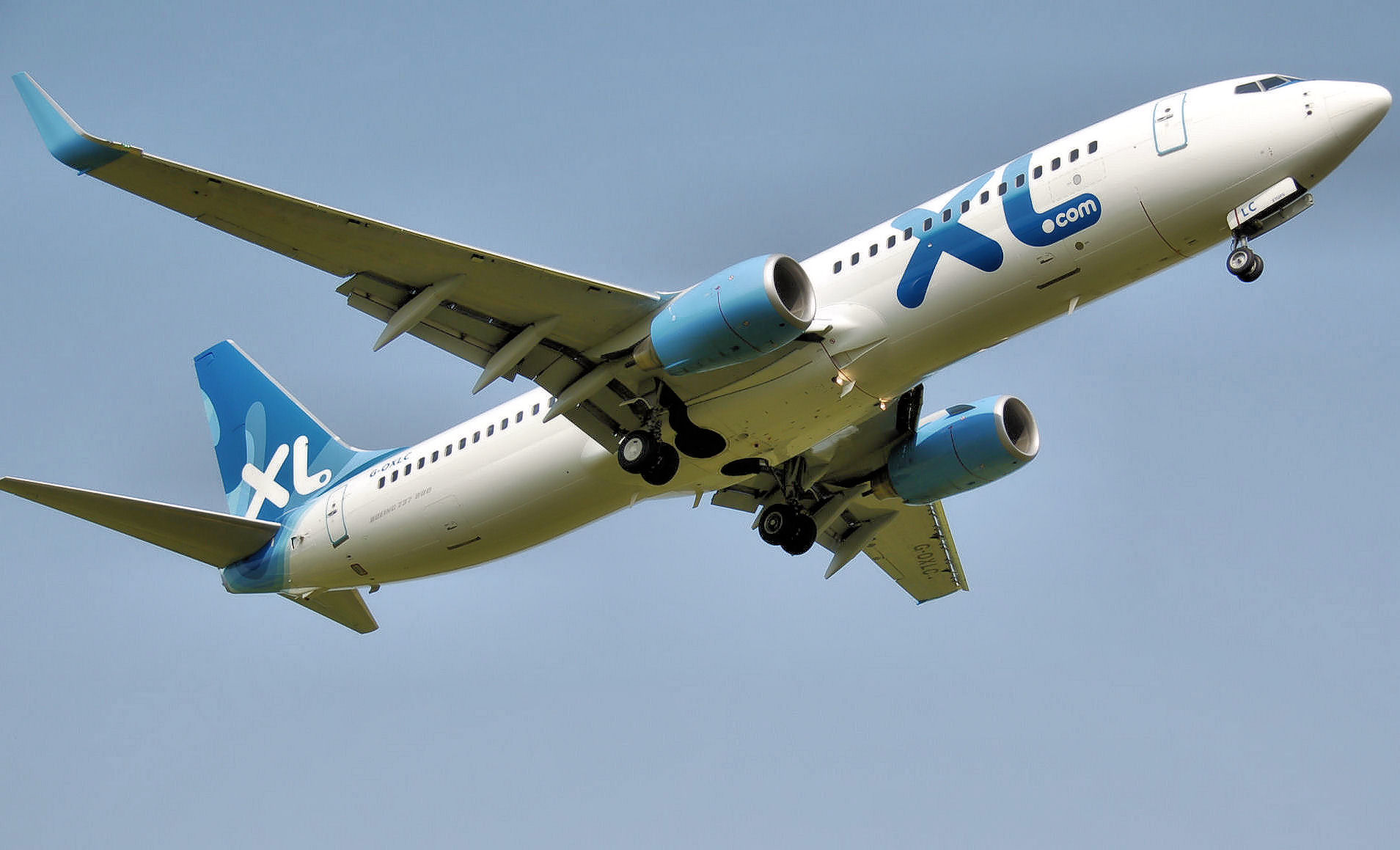
Boeing 737-800 in final livery

In the climate of general economic downturn in the travel and airline industries during previous years, shortly after announcing group operating losses of £24m, Chairman Peter Owen unexpectedly resigned. At this stage XL was flying to over 40 destinations in Europe, Egypt, the Caribbean and USA from 13 UK airports and in 2007 carried 3.1m passengers. On 11 September 2008, parent company XL Leisure Group filed for administration, although for some time the group's website continued taking bookings. The group announced, via its website, that on 12 September 2008, 11 companies associated with the group would be put into administration, including XL Airways UK Limited. This following statement was released: "The companies entered into administration having suffered as a result of volatile fuel prices, the economic downturn, and were unable to obtain further funding. The joint administrators cannot continue trading the business and therefore all flights operated by the companies have been immediately cancelled and the aircraft grounded".

Immediately, on September 12, 2008, XL announced that it was ceasing operations with debts estimated at £205m after its prime creditors and loan guarantors, Icelandic bank Straumur and the Eimskip transportation group, withdrew support. Although XL had already apparently apprised the CAA of its difficulties some weeks earlier, it continued to accept holiday bookings, leaving thousands of customers with lost deposits, in addition to some 90,000 holidaymakers stranded in 50 destinations across Europe, USA, the Caribbean and Africa. 63,000 of the stranded passengers were on package holidays, so were covered by the ATOL bond, which ensured paid-for repatriation. The Civil Aviation Authority (CAA) chartered a number of aircraft from a variety of British airlines. One widely reported Astraeus flight from Sharm el-Sheikh was flown by Iron Maiden lead singer Bruce Dickinson. Passengers who had booked direct, and were therefore not ATOL-protected, had to arrange their own flights home, but in some cases were offered special fares by airlines, or were offered spare seats on CAA-organised flights at a reasonable cost.

== Destinations ==
On 26 August 2008, XL Airways announced the cancellation of the Caribbean long-haul programme until further notice from 3:00 November 2008, due to high fuel prices and declining passenger numbers. Routes cancelled were: St Kitts & Nevis, Trinidad & Tobago, St Lucia, Antigua, Grenada, Barbados. The airline's destinations prior to ceasing operations were:

- Alicante
- Amsterdam
- Antalya
- Antigua
- Arrecife
- Barbados Focus city
- Belfast
- Birmingham
- Bodrum
- Bristol Base
- Brussels
- Bucharest
- Budapest
- Burgas
- Calgary
- Chambéry
- Chania
- Copenhagen
- Corfu
- Dalaman
- Düsseldorf
- East Midlands Base
- Faro
- Frankfurt
- Fuerteventura
- Funchal
- Geneva
- Glasgow Base
- Gothenburg
- Grenoble
- Heraklion
- Humberside
- Hurghada
- Ivalo
- Kalamata
- Kaieteur
- Kavala
- Kefallinia
- Kos
- Kyiv
- Larnaca
- Las Palmas
- La Romana
- London Gatwick Base
- London Luton (Scheduled flights)
- Luxor
- Lviv
- Mahón
- Málaga
- Malta
- Manchester Base
- Marsa Alam
- Monastir
- Moscow
- Munich
- Murcia
- Mykonos
- Mytilene-Lesbos
- Newcastle Base
- Oslo
- Ovda
- Orlando-Sanford
- Palma de Mallorca
- Paphos
- Porto Santo
- Prague
- Preveza
- Rhodes
- Saint Petersburg
- Santorini
- Sharm el-Sheikh
- Skiathos
- Stavanger
- Stockholm
- Taba
- Tel Aviv
- Tenerife
- Thessaloniki
- Tobago
- Vancouver
- Venice
- Vienna
- Volos
- Warsaw
- Zakynthos

== Awards ==
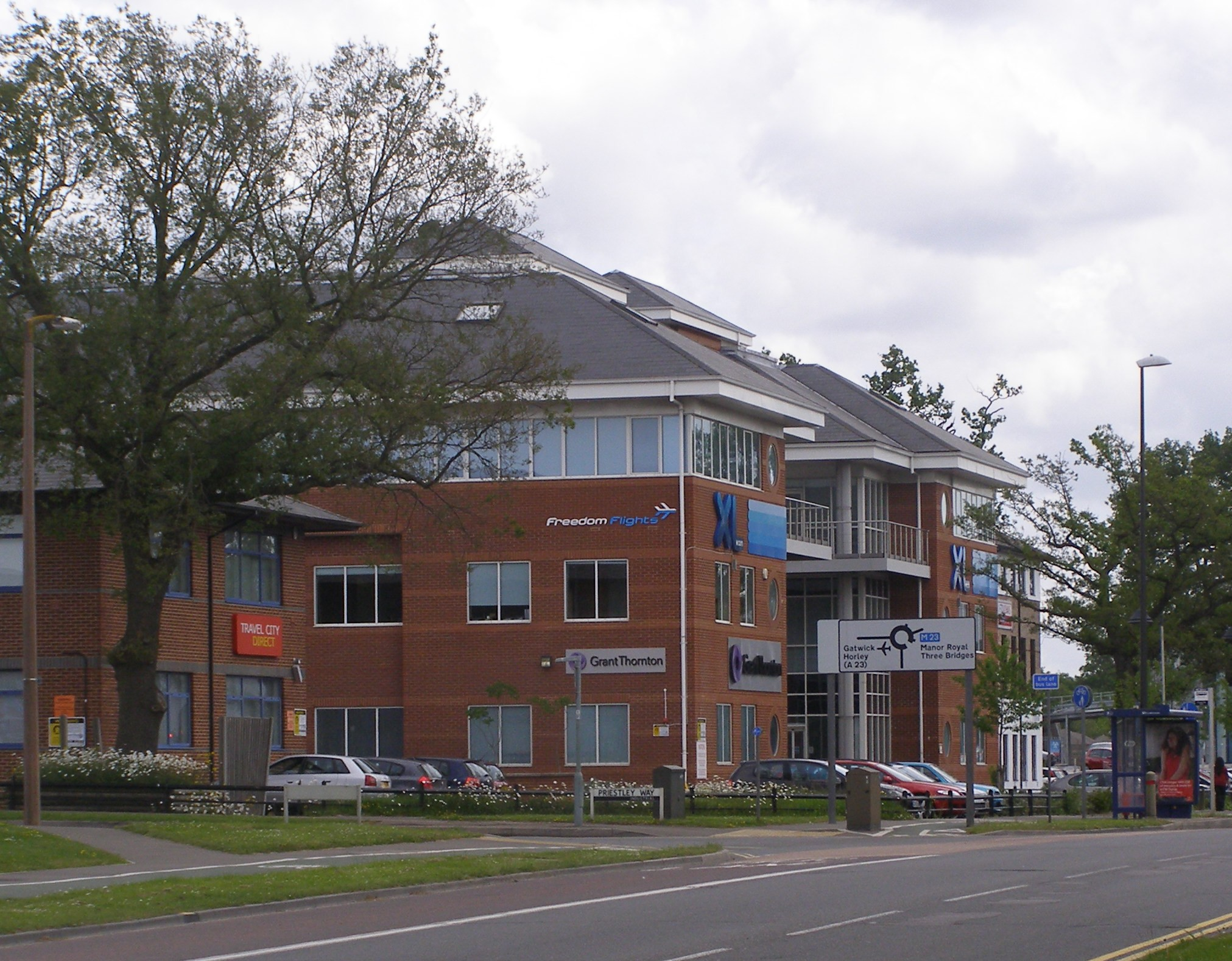
XL Airways Headquarters in Crawley

The airline won a number of awards, including Best Charter Airline 2006, World's Leading Charter Airline 2004, 2005 and 2007, Best Charter Airline 2004 and 2005 and UK Charter Airline Punctuality Awards for Summer 2002 - Runner Up.

== Sponsorship ==
For the 2007-2008 football season, XL Airways were the sponsors of West Ham United F.C. West Ham only received £2.5 million out of the planned £7.5 million sponsorship deal, which they cancelled on 12 September 2008 when the XL Leisure Group went into administration.

== Fleet ==
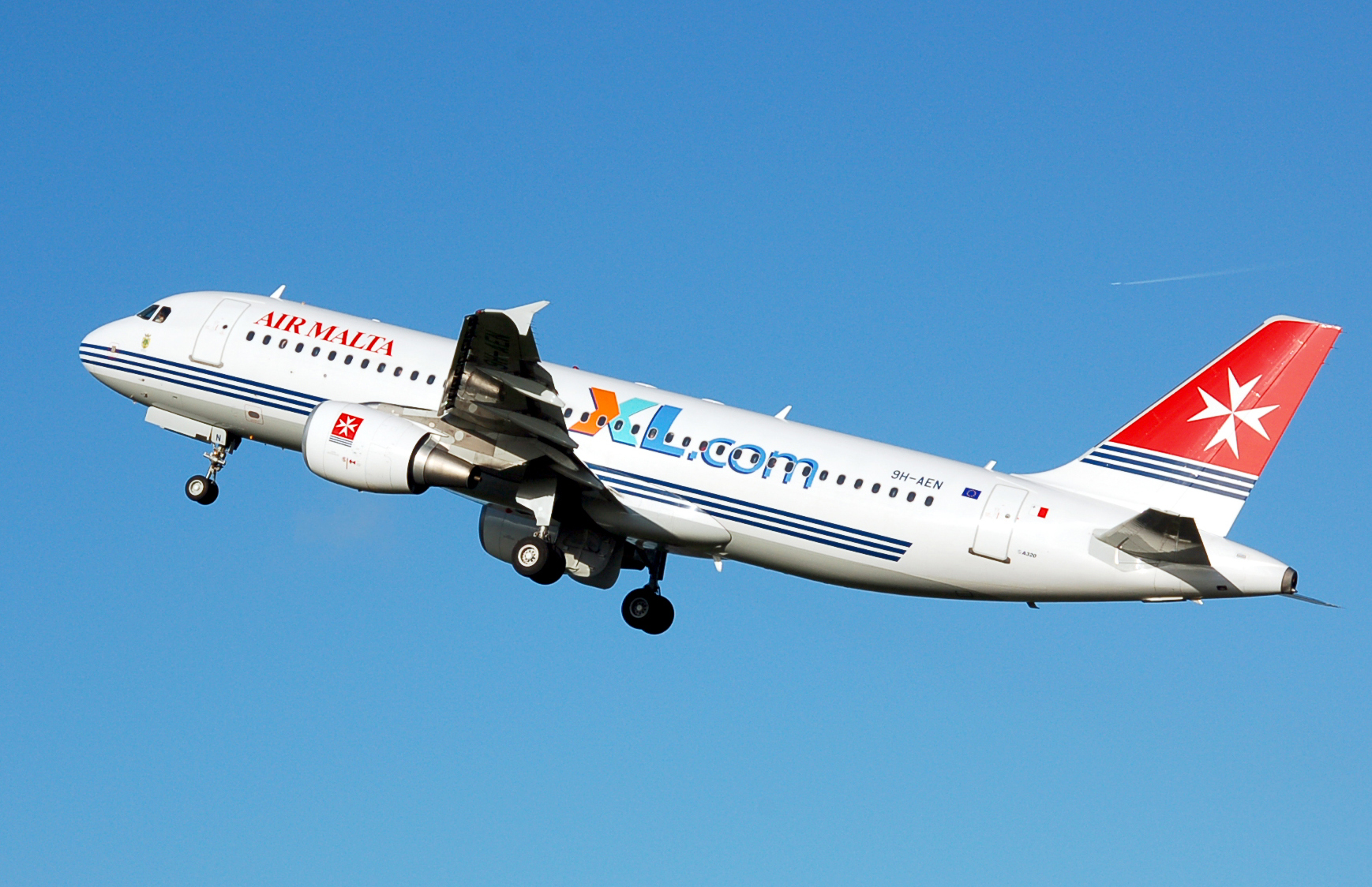
Air Malta Airbus A320-200, operated on behalf of XL

The XL Airways UK fleet included the following aircraft types:

Aircraft	Total	Introduced	Retired	Remarks
Airbus A320-200	1	2006	2008	Leased from Air Malta
Airbus A330-200	1	2008	2008	Leased from XL Airways France
Boeing 727-200	5	1995	2001	
Boeing 737-200	2	1994	1997	Transferred to Peach Air
Boeing 737-400	3	2005	2005	Leased from Air Atlanta Icelandic
Boeing 737-800	25	1998	2008	Parked under XL Airways UK registrations before going to different airlines
Boeing 737-900ER	2	2008	2008	Transferred to Lion Air
Boeing 747-300	2	2006	2007	Leased from Air Atlanta Icelandic
Boeing 757-200	5	2005	2008	
Boeing 767-200	1	2003	2005	Leased from Air Atlanta Europe
Boeing 767-200ER	2	2004	2007	Leased from Air Atlanta Icelandic
Boeing 767-300ER	3	2004	2008	Parked under XL Airways UK registrations before going to different airlines
McDonnell Douglas MD-83	1	2006	2007	Leased from Sky Wings and operated by UKJet

== Incidents and accidents ==
On 16 July 2003, a Boeing 737-800 (G-XLAG) with 190 passengers and seven crew took off from Manchester Airport while vehicles were working near the end of the runway. Despite the crew being told the runway was operating at reduced length, they took off from a runway intersection with reduced length using a reduced thrust setting calculated for the assumed normal runway length. The aircraft lifted off over the vehicles, missing them by 56 feet (17 m), according to the UK Air Accidents Investigation Branch report. Six safety recommendations were made.

On 4 November 2004, the left wing of a Boeing 767-200 (G-SATR) struck the right horizontal stabiliser of a stationary Bmibaby Boeing 737-300 while both aircraft were awaiting departure from Manchester Airport. The investigation concluded that the Excel 767 Captain, who bore primary responsibility for collision avoidance, misjudged the available separation due to a combination of physiological limitations, distractions and a false assumption regarding his Air Traffic Control clearance.

== XL Airways Ireland ==
From May 2007 XL Airways operated flights from Dublin, Cork and Knock which were marketed through XL Holidays as XL Airways Ireland. The inaugural flight operated from Dublin to Palma on 1 May 2007. Flights were offered to the following destinations prior to the airline ceasing operation:

From Dublin:

- Bourgas
- Faro
- Mykonos
- Palma de Mallorca
- Reus
- Santorini
- Skiathos
- Zakynthos

From Cork:

- Santorini

From Knock:

- Bourgas
- London Gatwick
- Faro

== See also ==
- List of defunct airlines of the United Kingdom
