= EUK =

EUK may refer to:

- Air Atlanta Europe, a defunct British airline
- Edinburgh UK Tracker Trust, a British investment trust
- Entertainment UK, a defunct British retailer
