= Travel City Direct =

Travel and holiday companies of the United Kingdom

- Type: Private
- Industry: Tour operator
- Founded: 2002
- Defunct: 28 September 2018 (now fully under Virgin Holidays)
- Headquarters: Crawley, West Sussex, UK
- Area served: United Kingdom
- Key people: MD: Joe Thompson
- Products: Package holidays
- Parent: Virgin Group
- Website: Travel City Direct [www.virginholidays.com]

Travel City Direct was a brand owned by Virgin Holidays. It was previously the trading name of the Really Great Holiday Company PLC, a British holiday company based in Crawley (close to London Gatwick Airport), specialising in holidays to the United States. The company was part of the third largest tour operator in the United Kingdom, the XL Leisure Group and was the UK's largest direct sell tour operator to Florida.

== History ==
=== Roy Boardman Thomas L Jones & Trevor Wignall ===
The company was established by the Boardman, Jones & Wignall family of Swansea in 1992 following the sale of their retail travel division Winston Rees Travel to Going Places and was purchased in 2005 by Avion Group Iceland which also owned a majority stake in XL Airways.

Travel City Direct chartered flights from American Trans Air in the early days using Lockheed Tristar aircraft which stopped in Gander, Newfoundland to refuel onroute. In 2002 Travel City Direct changed airline operators to European Aviation based in Bournemouth using former British Airways Boeing 747 aircraft that were acquired from BA after 11 September. In 2003 Travel City Direct also started using Air Atlanta Europe Boeing 747 aircraft in addition to European Aviation to meet the demand for their holidays, this resulted in over 20 flights per week to Orlando in summer 2003. Travel City operated 2 call centres, one Swansea based and another in Blackpool.

=== XL Leisure Group ===
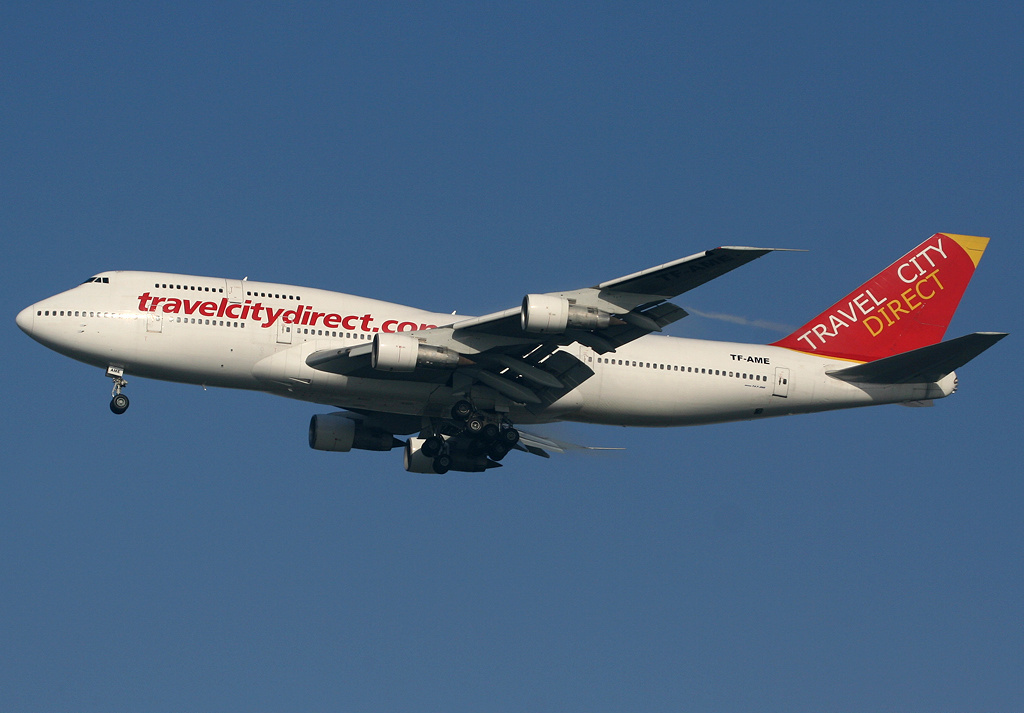
Travel City Direct branded aircraft TF-AME (owned by Air Atlanta Icelandic and operated by XL Airways) seen at Manchester Airport

Due to financial instabilities with European Aviation in 2004, Travel City switched all its flying to Air Atlanta Europe in March 2004 and branded all aircraft in Travel City Direct livery. XL Airways, which was also part of Air Atlanta Icelandic, took over the operating of Air Atlanta Europe in 2005 and subsequently took over the year round operations to Orlando Sanford International Airport from Manchester Airport and London Gatwick Airport. During the summer season XL Airways operated up to 16 flights a week with additional departures from Glasgow International Airport and Cardiff International Airport using the Air Atlanta Icelandic owned Boeing 747 aircraft.

The XL management team commenced on a management buyout of XL Airways & Travel City Direct in 2006 which was funded by a loan from Avion that was due to be repaid in 2008 prior to the collapse.

=== Virgin Group ===
On 12 September 2008 the XL Leisure Group which owned Travel City Direct went into administration, and subsequently shut down operations after the administrators could not secure funding for XL, however, on 18 December 2008 it was announced that Virgin Holidays had acquired the trading name of Travel City Direct and then resurrected operations again under the Travel City Direct brand on 5 January 2009. Unlike the previous incarnation used by the collapsed XL Leisure Group, which had dedicated flights for Travel City Direct into Orlando Sanford, Travel City Direct will be using seats on Virgin Atlantic scheduled flights into the larger Orlando International Airport.
