= Air Atlanta Icelandic =

Charter airline of Iceland

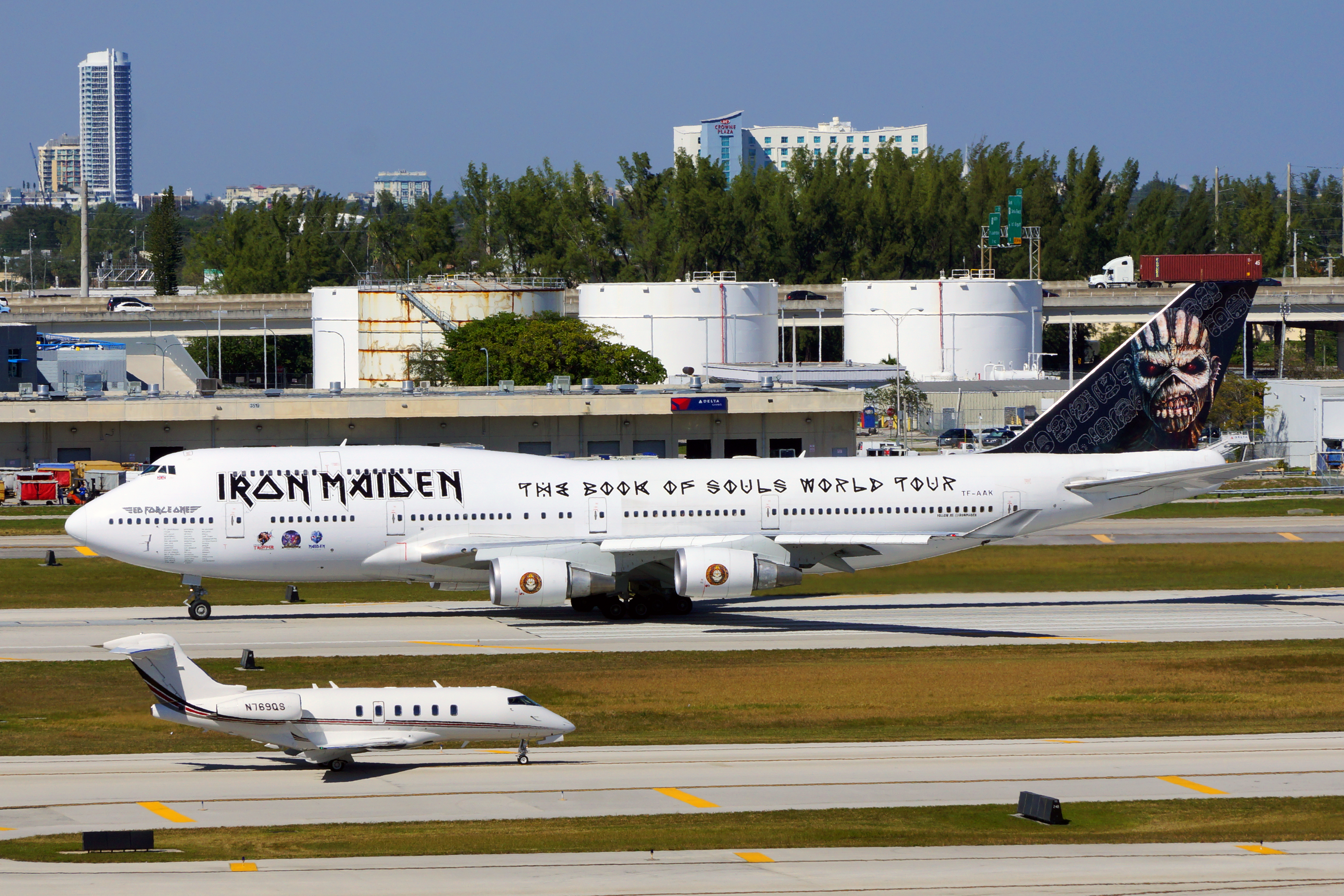
- Air Atlanta Icelandic Boeing 747-400 painted in Iron Maiden livery carrying the band on its tour
IATA	ICAO	Call sign
CC	ABD	ATLANTA
- Founded: 10 February 1986; 40 years ago
- Hubs: Keflavík International Airport
- Fleet size: 8
- Headquarters: Kópavogur, Iceland
- Key people: Baldvin Mar Hermannsson (CEO)
- Website: www.airatlanta.com

Air Atlanta Icelandic is a charter and ACMI airline based in Kópavogur, Iceland. It specialises in leasing aircraft on an ACMI (Aircraft, Crews, Maintenance, Insurance) and wet lease basis to airlines worldwide needing extra passenger and cargo capacity. It also operates charter services. The company operates in different countries and has bases worldwide.

The airline has a subsidiary in Malta, Air Atlanta Europe.

== History ==
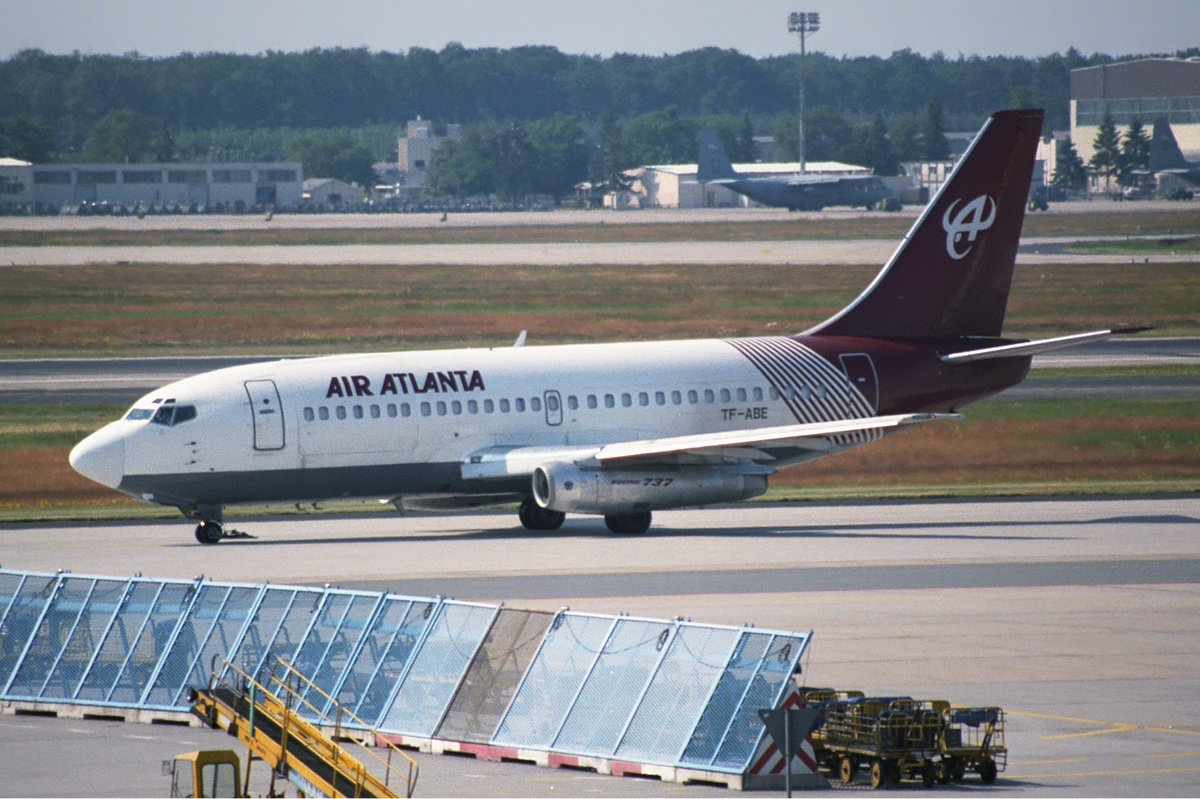
A former Air Atlanta Icelandic Boeing 737-200

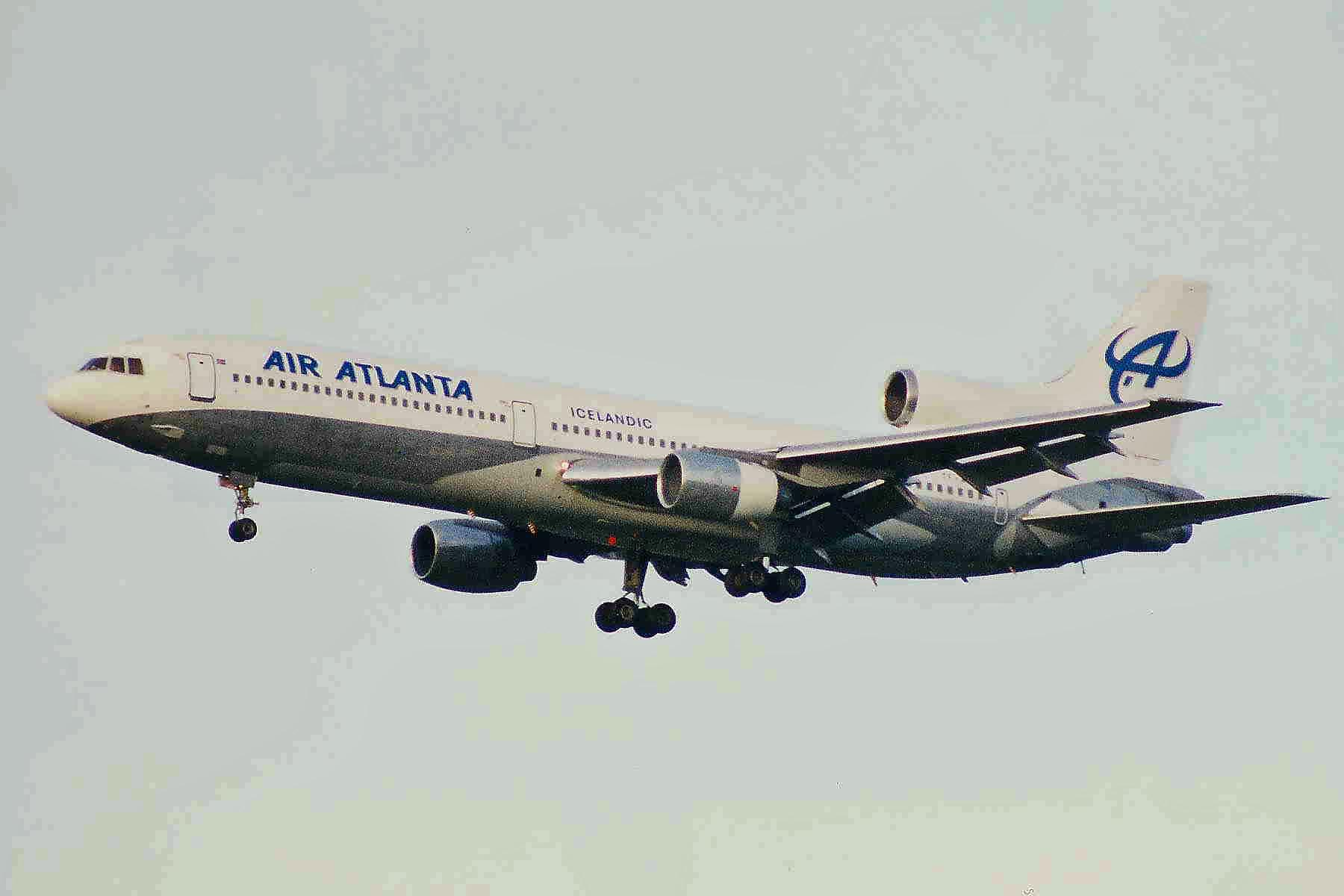
A former Air Atlanta Icelandic Lockheed L-1011-500

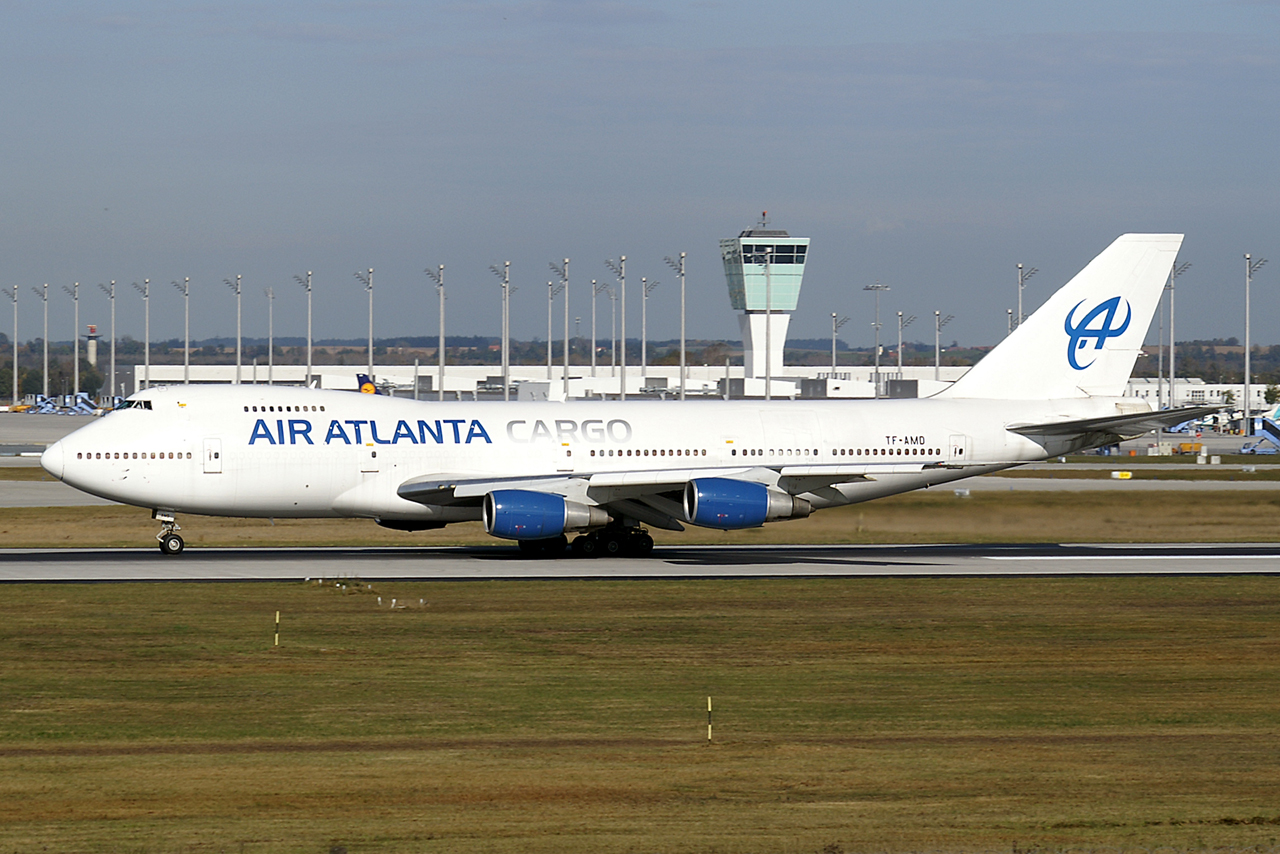
A former Air Atlanta Icelandic Boeing 747-200B

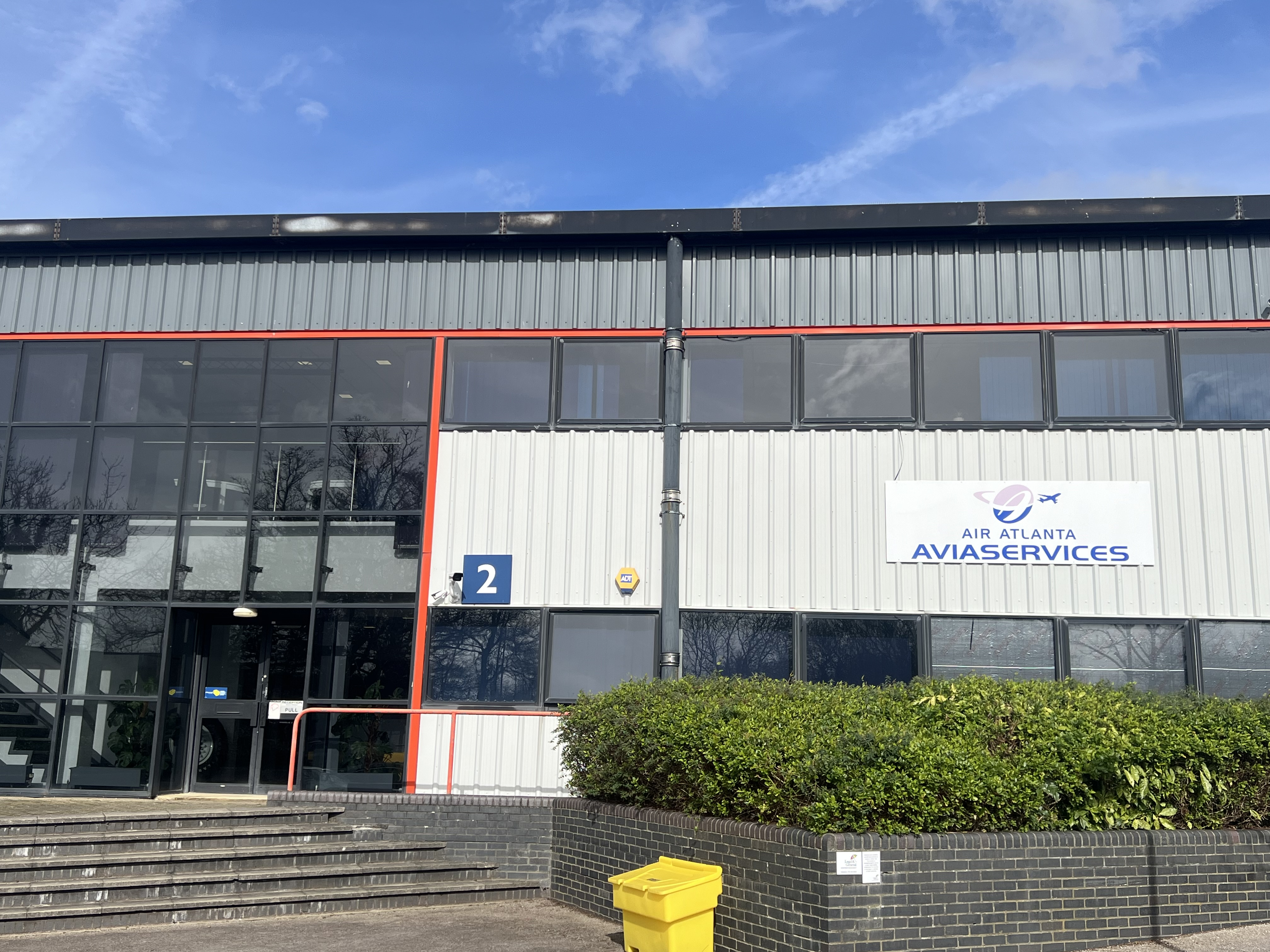
Air Atlanta Aviaservices in Crawley, dedicated to maintenance

The airline was established on 10 February 1986 by Captain Arngrímur Jóhannsson and his wife, Þóra Guðmundsdóttir. It started operations in 1986. Its first contract came when Caribbean Airways wet-leased a Boeing 707-320 from them for its London to Barbados flights. In 1988, the airline leased planes for Air Afrique to be used during the Hajj pilgrimage trips. This would become an important part of the structure of Air Atlanta Icelandic later on. Sudan Airways and Lufthansa were among the other airlines that benefited from leasing passenger airplanes from Air Atlanta Icelandic during the late 1980s, as well as Finnair, which leased a Boeing 737 from the Icelandic company.

It was in 1991 that Air Atlanta Icelandic was able to take passengers to the sky with its own airline operation. Its first flight was with a Lockheed L-1011-500 plane. Later in 1992, Air Atlanta Icelandic participated in United Nations peacekeeper airlifts, flying the UN representatives from the former Yugoslavia to Nigeria and France.

In 1993, the Boeing 747 arrived, and Saudia became one of the first airlines to lease that plane from Air Atlanta Icelandic, also for Hajj flights. After signing a contract with Samvinn Travel, Air Atlanta Icelandic began operating domestic charter flights as well. Later in 1993, a flight from Phnom Penh to Bangkok was launched using a Boeing 737-200.

By 1994, Air Atlanta Icelandic had obtained rights to operate service from many other countries, including the United States, from where it had a flight to Colombia; and the Philippines, from where it was allowed to operate domestic charter flights. About that time, it began to offer flights within Europe and began service to Portugal.

In 1996, a couple rented an Air Atlanta Icelandic Lockheed L-1011-500 to have a sky-wedding. The couple and its wedding guests were treated to a flight over the Arctic Circle, while the wedding was performed inside of the jet.

1997 saw the arrival of contracts with airlines such as Britannia Airways and Iberia, which would use an Air Atlanta Icelandic plane for its routes from Barajas International Airport in Madrid to José Martí International Airport in Havana and to other points in the Caribbean. That year also saw the arrival of the airline's first Boeing 747SP, which would later be utilized by government officials, sports teams, The Rolling Stones, and others.

In 1998, Air Atlanta Icelandic leased planes for British Airways. In 1999, Magnus G. Thorstenn was named the company's new CEO. The airline became a fully wide bodied airplane airline in 1999 when it sold the last of its Boeing 737s. In 2000, Air India joined the growing list of airlines that have leased airplanes from Air Atlanta Icelandic airlines.

In 2003, Air Atlanta Icelandic expanded into the United Kingdom with its subsidiary, Air Atlanta Europe, which operated Boeing 747s ad hoc, charter and for the Florida tour operator, Travel City Direct.

In March 2004, the company acquired a 40.5% stake in the UK charter airline Excel Airways. That stake later increased to 76.9%. In January 2005, the Avion Group was formed, and Air Atlanta Icelandic and Islandsflug merged under the Air Atlanta Icelandic brand name.

In 2005, the Avion Group acquired Eimskip, a leading Icelandic sea transportation company, and Travel City Direct, a UK holiday company and the airline Icebird Airlines. In 2006, the Avion Group announced the purchase of the entire issued share capital of French charter airline Star Airlines, the second largest charter airline in the French market. Star Airlines operated charter flights mainly to destinations in Africa, the Middle East, and the Mediterranean, in addition to regular services to Lebanon, Male, and cities in Mexico.

In June 2006, Air Atlanta Icelandic wet-leased one Boeing 747-200 to Yangtze River Express to operate cargo freight between Shanghai - Anchorage - Los Angeles.

In October 2006, the Avion Group changed its name to HF Eimskipafélag Íslands, and at the same time sold UK Leisure Group Excel as well as 51% of Avion Aircraft Trading. A decision was also made to merge both Excel Airways and Air Atlanta Europe into one airline. This was completed by October 2006.

In mid-2007, the airline decided to shift its focus to air cargo operations. The airline planned to move to cargo aircraft and laid off most of its passenger aircraft aircrew. Today, the company focuses on both passenger aircraft and cargo aircraft.

Britflights cancelled plans to operate aircraft from Air Atlanta Icelandic from the UK to Canada from June 2011, citing fuel uncertainties.

Air Atlanta Icelandic operated two Boeing 747-400s for National Airlines (N8) in the year 2011. One flew cargo charter flights and the other one was wet-leased to Cargolux for a period of time.

In December 2015, three former Air Atlanta Icelandic Boeing 747 registered TF-ARH, TF-ARM and TF-ARN were reported abandoned at Kuala Lumpur International Airport. Air Atlanta Icelandic senior vice president of sales and marketing Baldvin M. Hermannsson said that the three aircraft had belonged to Air Atlanta, but were returned to their owner in 2010.

In 2016, the airline provided a Boeing 747-428 (registration TF-AAK) to the heavy metal band Iron Maiden for the Book of Souls World Tour, which replaced a modified Astraeus Airlines 757 as "Ed Force One". On 12 March, the aircraft sustained damage to engines 1 and 2 while being towed for refueling at Santiago, Chile. The extent of the damage required the band and its crew to charter additional aircraft to continue touring through Argentina and Brazil while the aircraft awaited repairs at Santiago International Airport. Repairs involving replacing both port-side engines, cowlings, and reversers were completed by 20 March and the aircraft returned to the tour.

In 2021, Air Atlanta Icelandic reopened its subsidiary Air Atlanta Europe, to operate a passenger Boeing 777 fleet.

In 2025, Air Atlanta Icelandic added its first Boeing 777-200ER.

In May 2026, Atlas Air Worldwide Holdings agreed terms to purchase a 49% stake in Air Atlanta. The transaction establishes a strategic partnership that expands Atlas' global operating platform and enhances access to widebody capacity in key international markets. Titan Aviation Holdings is separately acquiring the aircraft owned by the Air Atlanta Group and will lease the aircraft back to the Air Atlanta.

== Destinations ==
Air Atlanta Icelandic operates worldwide passenger and cargo flights as charters and ACMI services for various customers. For example, as of February 2025, the airline operated cargo flights on behalf of Saudia from their hub in Jeddah to Brussels, Amsterdam, Frankfurt (Hahn), Dhaka, Hong Kong, Houston, New York, and Greenville–Spartanburg.

== Fleet ==
=== Current fleet ===
As of July 2026, Air Atlanta Icelandic operates the following aircraft:

Aircraft	In service	Orders	Notes
Boeing 747-400BCF	2	—	
Boeing 747-400BDSF	2	—	
Boeing 747-400F	4	—	
Total	8	—	

=== Former fleet ===
As of April 2026, the Air Atlanta Icelandic fleet consists of the following aircraft:

Aircraft	Total	Notes
Boeing 747-400F	4	Operating for Network Aviation Group.
Boeing 747-400F	3	Operating for Magma Aviation.
Boeing 747-400F	1	Parked at CGK, lsf Aquiline International.
Boeing 777-200ER	1	Parked at LDE.
Total	9	

== Accidents and incidents ==
- On November 7, 2004, an Air Atlanta Boeing 747 freighter was taking off but airport tower workers noticed a fire in one of the engines. There was also a loud sound at around the same time and the aircraft crashed. The aircraft was heavily damaged but there were no fatalities.
- On 25 March 2008, an Air Atlanta Icelandic aircraft operating for Saudi Arabian Airlines as Flight 810 (TF-ARS) from Prince Mohammad Bin Abdulaziz Airport, Madinah made an unscheduled landing at Zia International Airport (now Shahjalal International Airport), Dhaka. During the landing roll the tower controller reported that he saw a fire on the right hand wing. Upon vacating the runway, the crew received a fire indication for engine number three. The fire extinguisher was activated and all engines were shut down. The aircraft, a Boeing 747-357, which was damaged beyond repair, was successfully evacuated. Only minor injuries were incurred. Investigations revealed a fuel leak where the fuel enters the front spar for engine number three.
- On November 9, 2023, a horse became loose on an Air Atlanta Icelandic 747 headed from New York's John F. Kennedy International airport to Liege, Belgium.
