= Virgin Atlantic Holidays =

Travel and holiday companies of the United Kingdom

Virgin Holidays Limited
- Type: Private
- Industry: Tour operator
- Founded: 1985; 41 years ago
- Headquarters: Crawley, England
- Area served: United Kingdom
- Key people: Corneel Koster (CEO)
- Products: Package holidays
- Parent: Virgin Atlantic (51%)
- Website: www.virginatlantic.com/holidays

Virgin Holidays Limited, trading as Virgin Atlantic Holidays, is a company within the Virgin Group that offers holidays worldwide with destinations including the US and Canada, the Caribbean, Africa, the Middle East, the Indian Ocean and the Far East. In addition, the company has an established ski program and a specialist cruise division called "Virgin Holidays Cruises". The company was formed in 1985, a year after the successful launch of Virgin Atlantic in June 1984. Initially selling seats on Virgin Atlantic routes to New York City, Miami and Orlando the company has grown to become one of the largest and most successful long-haul scheduled tour operators in the UK.

Due to the COVID-19 outbreak in 2020, it was announced on 5 May 2020 that Virgin Holidays would be rebranded as Virgin Atlantic Holidays. The full rebrand took place in 2022.

== Operations ==
Virgin Holidays' headquarters are in Crawley, England. Seven other offices are located in Canada and the United States.

In September 2008, Virgin Holidays launched a partnership with Herbert Ypma's HIP Hotels to create Virgin Holidays + HIP Hotels, a bespoke tour operator providing holidays to luxury and boutique hotels around the world. This partnership has now ended and HIP Hotels has since been acquired by a private equity firm.

On 18 December 2008, Virgin Holidays acquired the assets and brand name of Travel City Direct from XL Leisure Group, which collapsed in September 2008. Travel City Direct has now been merged into the Virgin Holidays brand.

Nearly a year later, on 15 December 2009, Virgin Holidays announced that it had bought the small independent tour operator, Bales Worldwide.

Virgin Holidays has a network of retail concessions throughout the UK in Next. These are supplemented by several standalone shops.

In 2015, Virgin Holidays left their long standing home at The Galleria and moved to Aeronautics House close to Virgin Atlantic. Initially announced as a temporary move whilst the Galleria was refurbished it was later announced that Virgin Holidays would move into a newly built building, the Leonardo Building, with Virgin Atlantic.

In November 2019, Virgin Holidays established Orville Richard Burrell (Shaggy) as their Chief Caribbean Officer.

=== Virgin Holidays Cruises ===
Virgin Holidays Cruises Limited
- Type: Limited
- Industry: Package Cruise Holidays
- Founded: Royal Wootton Bassett, Swindon, Wiltshire (July 9, 2000)
- Headquarters: Crawley, United Kingdom
- Owner: Virgin Group
- Number of employees: 80
- Website: www.virginholidayscruises.co.uk

Virgin Holidays Cruises is a company owned by Virgin Group and is part of Virgin Holidays, headquartered in Crawley. The company specialises in package deals with cruises provided by other cruise lines.

The company was established in 2000 as Fast Track Holidays and was acquired by Virgin Holidays for an undisclosed sum in 2007. At the time of the Virgin takeover the company had 80 employees. The company name was officially changed to Virgin Holidays Cruises Limited on 15 June 2009.

== Environmental research ==
On 21 September 2006, Richard Branson announced that all profits the Virgin Group receives from Virgin Holidays would be ploughed into research and investment to develop sustainable sources of energy. He also committed the profits from Virgin Atlantic and Virgin Rail Group, which was estimated to be $3bn over the next 10 years. At the time he said, "Our generation has inherited an incredibly beautiful world from our parents and they from their parents, it is in our hands whether our children and their children inherit the same world."
