= XL Leisure Group =

U.K. travel company

- Trade name: XL Leisure Group
- Formerly: Excel Airways Group
- Company type: Private
- Industry: Package holidays
- Founded: November 2004
- Defunct: September 2008
- Fate: administration
- Headquarters: Crawley, West Sussex, UK
- Area served: United Kingdom, France, Germany, Australia
- Key people: CEO: Philip Wyatt; Chairman: Peter Owen
- Brands: XL; XL Holidays; XL Brand
- Subsidiaries: XL Airways UK; XL Airways France; XL Airways Germany

The XL Leisure Group (XLLG) was a major tour operating company in the UK, consisting of charter and scheduled airlines, holiday companies and flight-only tour operators. It also had operations in France, Germany, Ireland, Australia and Cyprus. The group's UK companies were placed into administration on 12 September 2008.

== History ==
The company began as Excel Airways Group. It was bought by the Icelandic Avion Group in November 2004, previously being owned by the Icelandic Flugfelagid Atlanta HF. In October 2006, there was a $450m management buyout of the company, although the Avion Group retained 49% of the company. It became XL Leisure Group on 22 December 2006. The French subsidiary, XL Airways France, used to be Star Airlines, while the German subsidiary XL Airways Germany began as Star Europe. At its height, it flew from 12 UK airports. The Irish airline began in May 2006.

=== Administration ===
XL Leisure Group confirmed on their website that 11 companies associated with the group had been put into administration on 12 September 2008. This includes XL Airways UK Limited, Excel Aviation Limited, Explorer House Limited, Aspire Holidays Limited, Freedom Flights Limited, The Really Great Holiday Company plc, Travel City Direct. It was the biggest collapse of a British tour operator since 1974 when Court Line became insolvent, affecting 50,000 travellers. XL Airways Germany ceased operations in 2012, while XL Airways France ceased operations in 2019.

== Market share ==
XLLG claimed it was the third largest tour operating company in the UK. Prior to entering administration, it was the main shirt sponsor of West Ham United F.C. until the club terminated the partnership with immediate effect on 12 September.

== Member companies ==
At the time the Group entered administration in September 2008, it was made up of the following companies and shareholdings:

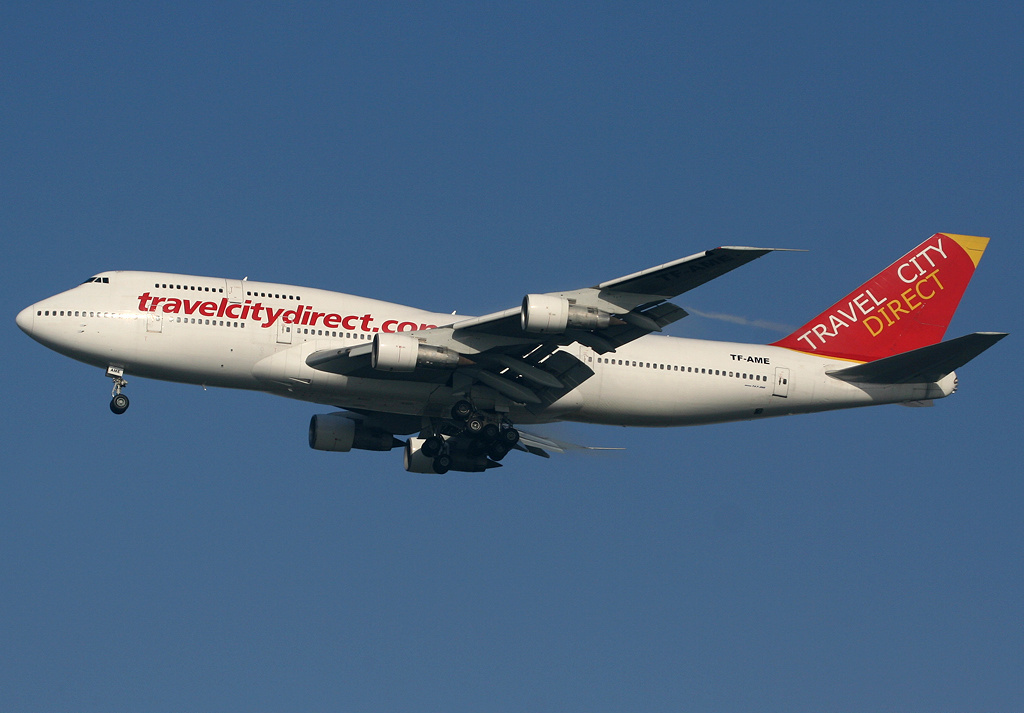
Travel City Direct's TF-AME seen at Manchester Airport

- Travel City Direct - A UK holiday company specialising in low-cost family holidays to Florida, other parts of the U.S. and the Caribbean. Flights were operated on behalf of Travel City Direct by XL Airways, using aircraft bearing dual-branded liveries. The brand was bought by Virgin Holidays in December 2008.
- Freedom Flights - A seat-only tour operator which primarily sold airline seats to UK tour operators. The majority of its seats were with XLLG's own XL Airways, although Freedom Flights also dealt with seat sales on other airlines.
- XL Holidays and Aspire Holidays - XL Holidays was the main tour-operating division of XLLG in the UK, offering holidays worldwide and was fully ATOL bonded. Aspire Holidays was a division of XL Holidays specialising in luxury bespoke holidays and was sold to Jeffersons Limited on 28 October 2008.
- CrystalTO and Heliades - CrystalTO is a French tour operator fully affiliated to XL Airways France, offering French travelers package holidays worldwide. Heliades is a tour operator in France, specialising primarily in holidays to Greece.
- XL Airways - Was a charter airline with brands in the UK, France and Germany. It began as Sabre Airways in 1994, and was renamed Excel Airways in 2001. It was later rebranded XL Airways in November 2006 after it was found that the airline was more commonly known by the British public as simply XL Airways. Following the acquisition of the French and German airlines Star Airlines and Star Europe, XLLG rebranded these as XL Airways France and XL Airways Germany in November 2006, creating a pan-European airline consisting of at least 34 Boeing and Airbus aircraft.
- XL Aviation and XL24 - XL Aviation was the commercial sales arm of XLLG. It sold charter capacity on flights operated by XL Airways and also bought and sold charter capacity on numerous other airlines. XL24 was a dealer in "relief" aircraft in the airline-to-airline market, providing sub-chartered aircraft from the XL Airways and other fleets to other airlines who required the extra capacity on short notice.
- Interests in:
  - Xtra Airways and Skywest, Inc. - Established in 1987, Xtra Airways is a charter airline based in Nevada, USA. It now has bases at Cincinnati/Northern Kentucky International Airport, Louisville, Kentucky, New York (John F. Kennedy International Airport) and Boston. It is owned by CXP Management, and XLLG holds a 19% share of the airline. Prior to XLLG's acquisition of 19% interest in Xtra Airways in summer 2005, the airline was known as Casino Express. The rebranding to Xtra Airways reflects a close relationship between Xtra and XL, which also includes similar aircraft liveries.
  - Skywest is an Australian regional airline, which began operations in 1963 as part of Ansett Airlines. It was previously owned by Advent Air, in which XLLG held a 5% share. Skywest has since become a wholly owned subsidiary of Virgin Australia Holdings, and now trades as Virgin Australia Regional Airlines.
