= Air Atlanta Europe =

Maltese-based airline

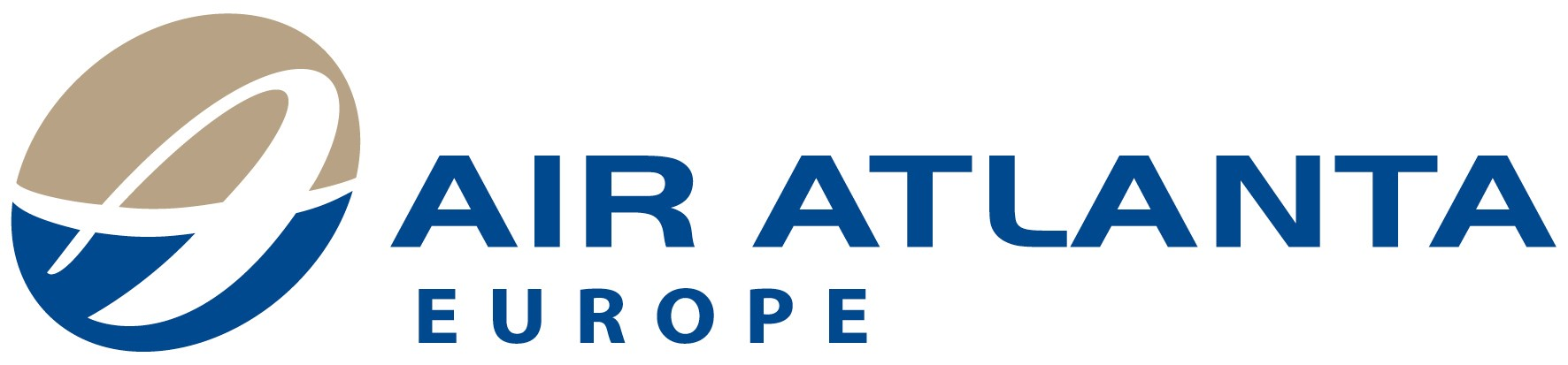

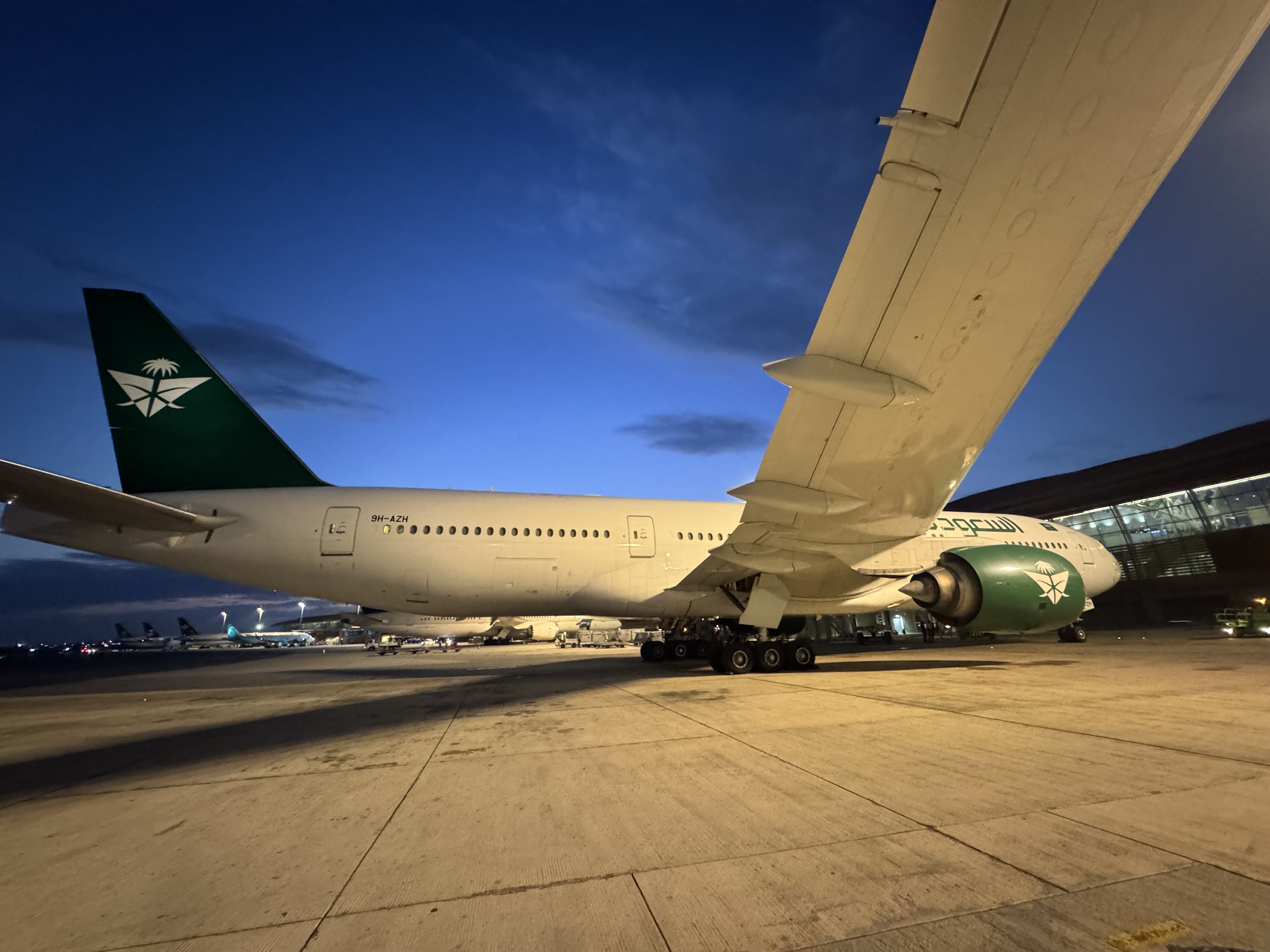
IATA	ICAO	Call sign
CT	AAE	EUROVIKING
- Founded: 2002
- Commenced operations: 2002
- Focus cities: Jeddah, Medina, Liège
- Frequent-flyer program: SkyTeam (for Saudia flights)
- Alliance: Air Atlanta Icelandic
- Fleet size: 11
- Headquarters: Birkirkara
- Key people: Baldvin Mar Hermannsson, CEO
- Website: www.airatlanta.com

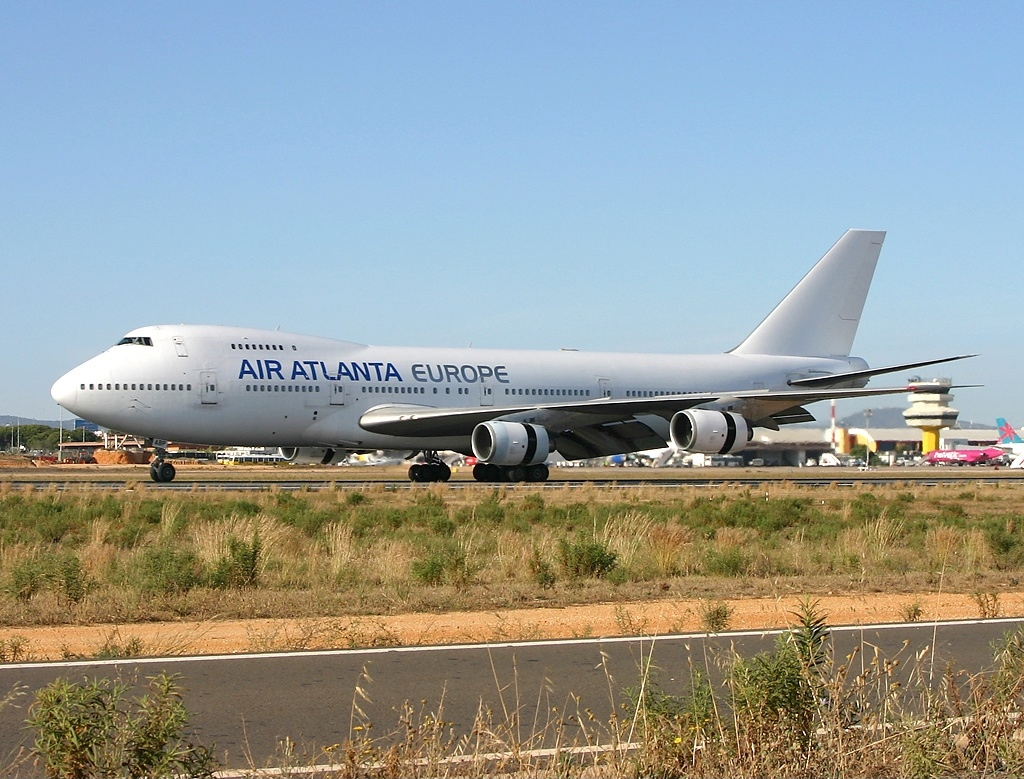

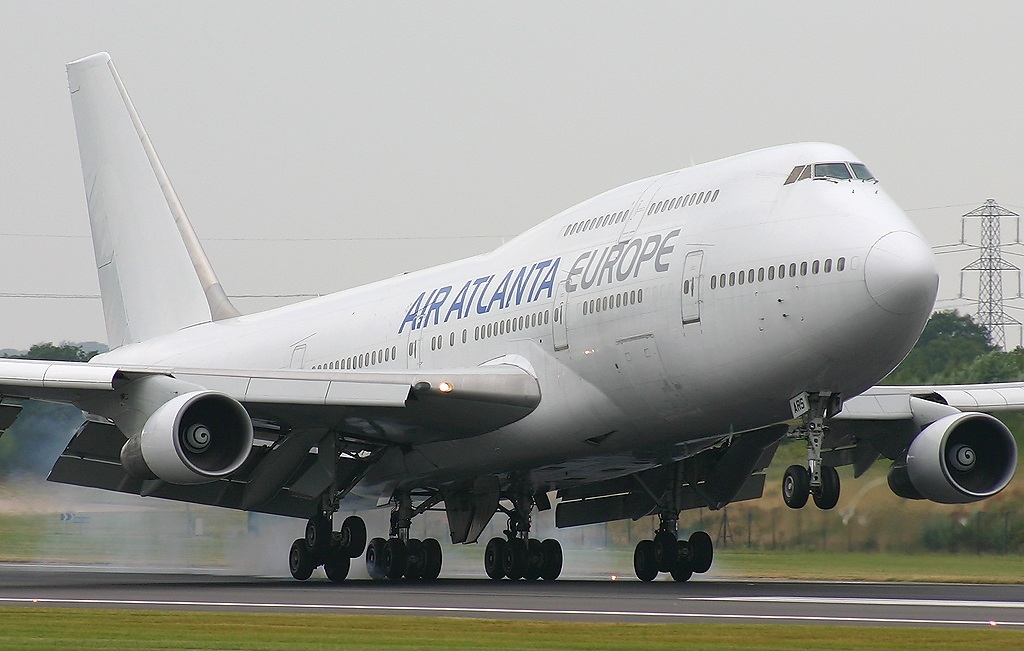
Boeing 747 at Manchester Airport in July 2005

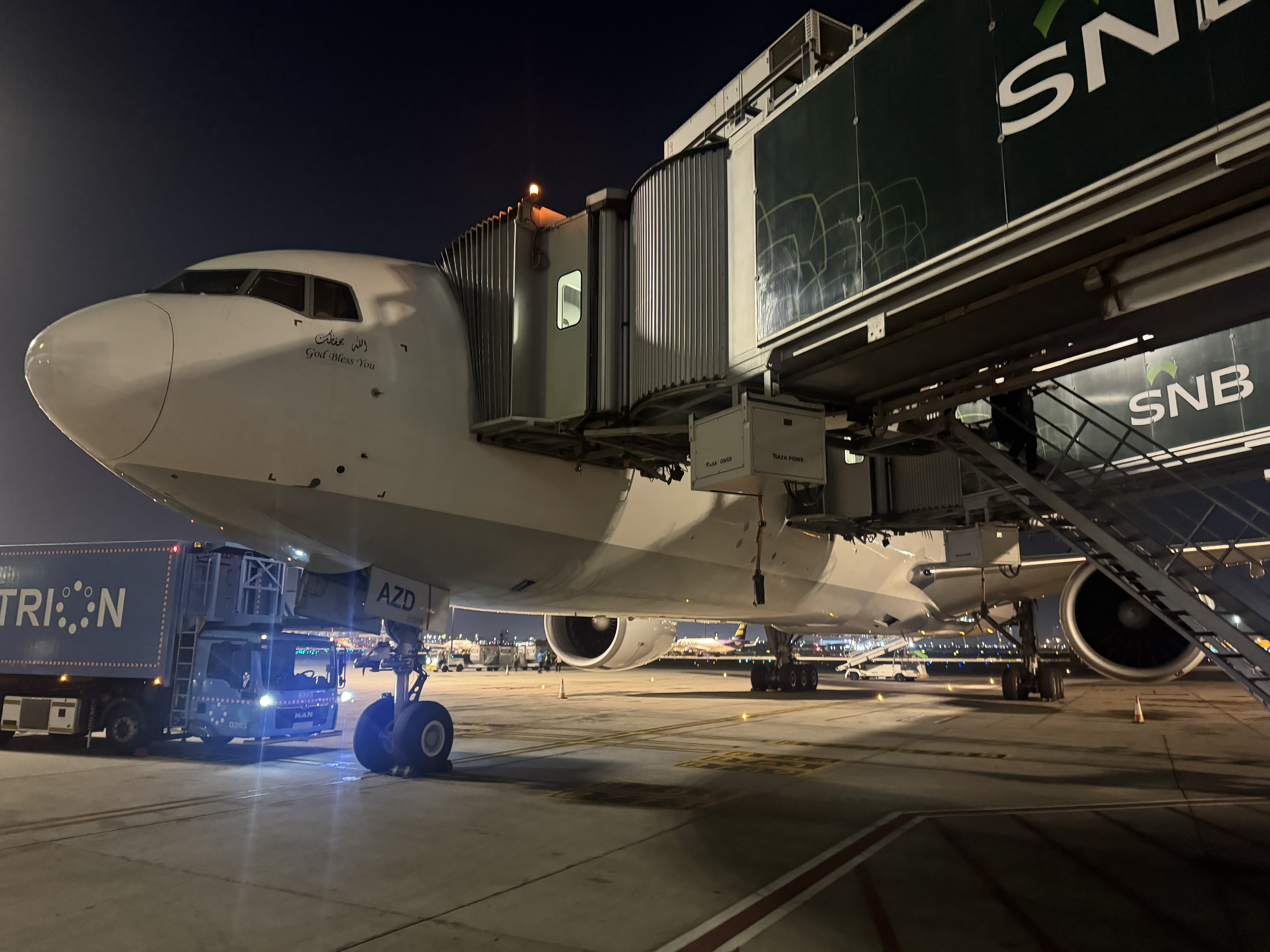
Boeing 777-300ER at King Abdulaziz International Airport in April 2025

Air Atlanta Europe is a Maltese-based charter airline and a sister company of Air Atlanta Icelandic, both operating under the Air Atlanta brand. The airline specializes in ACMI (Aircraft, Crew, Maintenance, and Insurance) and charter operations for global customers.

== History ==
The original Air Atlanta Europe was founded in 2002 as a UK-based airline under the same ownership as Air Atlanta Icelandic, primarily operating widebody passenger aircraft. The airline ceased operations in 2008.

In 2021, Air Atlanta Europe was re-established in Malta and continues to operate as a sister company to Air Atlanta Icelandic. The airline focuses on providing ACMI and charter services, maintaining the legacy of the Air Atlanta brand.

In October 2025, the airline welcomes its first Boeing 777 cargo.

== Fleet ==
=== Current fleet ===
As of July 2026, Air Atlanta Europe operates the following aircraft:

Aircraft	In service	Order	Passengers	Notes
Boeing 747-400BDSF	3			
Boeing 747-400F	2			
Boeing 777-200ER	2			
Boeing 777-300ER	2			
Boeing 777-300ERSF	2			
Total	11			

=== Former fleet ===
As of August 2025, Air Atlanta Europe operated 3 Boeing 737-400BDSF, 3 Boeing 747-400F, 2 Boeing 777-200ER and 2 Boeing 777-300ER.
